= Indonesia =

Country in Southeast Asia and Oceania

Republic of Indonesia Republik Indonesia
- Flag Emblem
- Motto: Bhinneka Tunggal Ika (Old Javanese) "Unity in Diversity"
- Anthem: Indonesia Raya "Great Indonesia"
- National ideology and philosophy: Pancasila (Sanskrit) "The Five Principles"
- Capital and largest city: Jakarta; 6°10′S 106°49′E
- Official languages: Indonesian
- Indigenous languages: 729 languages
- Writing system: Latin (predominantly) Regional: Javanese; Sundanese; Batak; Balinese; and others
- Ethnic groups (2010): 40.1% Javanese; 15.5% Sundanese; 3.7% Malay; 3.6% Batak; and 600+ others
- Religion (2025): 87.15% Islam; 10.44% Christianity; 1.66% Hinduism; 0.69% Buddhism; and others
- Demonym: Indonesian
- Government: Unitary presidential republic
  - President: Prabowo Subianto
  - Vice President: Vacant
- Legislature: People's Consultative Assembly (MPR)
  - Upper house: Regional Representative Council (DPD)
  - Lower house: House of Representatives (DPR)

Independence from the Netherlands
  - Proclamation: 17 August 1945
  - Recognition: 27 December 1949

Area
  - Total: 1,904,569 km^{2} (735,358 sq mi) (14th)
  - Water (%): 4.85

Population
  - 2026 estimate: ▲290,125,073 (4th)
  - 2020 census: 270,203,917
  - Density: 141/km^{2} (365.2/sq mi) (Note: Per the 2020 census) (88th)
- GDP (PPP): 2026 estimate
  - Total: ▲$5.483 trillion (7th)
  - Per capita: ▲$19,091 (103rd)
- GDP (nominal): 2026 estimate
  - Total: ▲$1.480 trillion (17th)
  - Per capita: ▲$5,153 (116th)
- Gini (2026): ▲36.8 medium inequality
- HDI (2023): ▲0.728 high (113th)
- Currency: Indonesian rupiah (Rp) (IDR)
- Time zone: UTC+7, +8, +9 (WIB, WITA, WIT)
- Date format: DD/MM/YYYY
- Calling code: +62
- ISO 3166 code: ID
- Internet TLD: .id

Indonesia, (Note: UK: /ˌɪndəˈniːziə, -ʒə/ IN-də-NEE-zee-ə, -zhə US: /ˌɪndəˈniːʒə, -ʃə/ IN-də-NEE-zhə, -shə; Indonesian pronunciation: [ɪndoˈnesia]) officially the Republic of Indonesia, (Note: Republik Indonesia ([reˈpublik ɪndoˈnesia]) is the most used official name, though the name Unitary State of the Republic of Indonesia (Negara Kesatuan Republik Indonesia, NKRI) also appears in some official documents, including the constitution.) is a country in Southeast Asia and Oceania, between the Indian and Pacific oceans. Comprising more than 13,000 islands—including Sumatra, Java, Sulawesi, and parts of Borneo and New Guinea—it is the world's largest archipelagic state and the 14th-largest country by area. Indonesia has extensive tropical forests and marine ecosystems that support some of the world's highest levels of biodiversity.

The Indonesian archipelago has been inhabited since prehistoric times, with evidence of early human presence including fossils of Homo erectus and Homo sapiens, and stone monuments. By the first millennium BCE, it had become connected to regional and international maritime trade networks. Hindu and Buddhist kingdoms developed by the early centuries CE, followed by the spread of Islam and the growth of Islamic states from the late medieval period. European powers later competed to monopolise trade in the Spice Islands of Maluku during the Age of Discovery. Dutch commercial and colonial control expanded from the 17th century and extended over most of the archipelago by the early 20th century, before Indonesia proclaimed its independence in the aftermath of World War II.

Since independence, Indonesia has experienced separatist conflicts, corruption, political upheaval and natural disasters, alongside democratisation and rapid economic growth. The country today is a presidential republic with an elected legislature and consists of 38 provinces, some of which enjoy greater autonomy than others. Home to over 290 million people, Indonesia ranks fourth in the world by population and has the largest Muslim population of any country. More than half of Indonesians live on Java, the most heavily populated island in the world, while the capital Jakarta is listed as the world's most populous city by the United Nations.

Indonesia has hundreds of ethnic groups and more than 700 languages, as well as diverse regional cultures. This diversity is reflected in the national motto, Bhinneka Tunggal Ika, meaning "unity in diversity". Indonesian, a standardised variety of Malay, is the official and national language and is widely used for communication between speakers of different local languages. Indonesia has the largest economy in Southeast Asia, with services and industry generating most output and economic activity concentrated on Java. Sea and air transport are the primary means of connecting the country's many islands. Indonesia is a middle power active in regional and global affairs and is a member of the United Nations, G20, the Non-Aligned Movement, ASEAN, and the Organisation of Islamic Cooperation.

== Etymology ==
The name Indonesia is usually explained as a combination of India and the Greek word nesos, together meaning 'Indian islands'. In 1850, George Windsor Earl, an English ethnologist, proposed the terms Indunesians and Malayunesians for the inhabitants of the "Indian Archipelago or Malay Archipelago", preferring the latter because he considered Indunesians too general. Earl's colleague James Richardson Logan adopted Indonesia as a geographical term for the Indian Archipelago.

German ethnographer Adolf Bastian from the University of Berlin helped popularise the name among scholars by using it in the title of his five-volume work Indonesia, or the Islands of the Malay Archipelago (German: Indonesien oder die Inseln des Malayischen Archipel), published between 1884 and 1894. Dutch scholars nevertheless tended to use Malay Archipelago (Dutch: Maleische Archipel) or the Netherlands East Indies (Nederlandsch Oost Indië).

After 1900, Indonesia became increasingly common in academic and public usage, and Indonesian nationalist organisations adopted it as an expression of national unity and freedom from colonial rule. Among its early Indonesian promoters was Soewardi Soerjaningrat, later known as Ki Hajar Dewantara, who established the Indonesische Persbureau in The Hague in November 1918, a press bureau that used Indonesia in its name.

== History ==
=== Prehistory, early states, and Islamisation ===
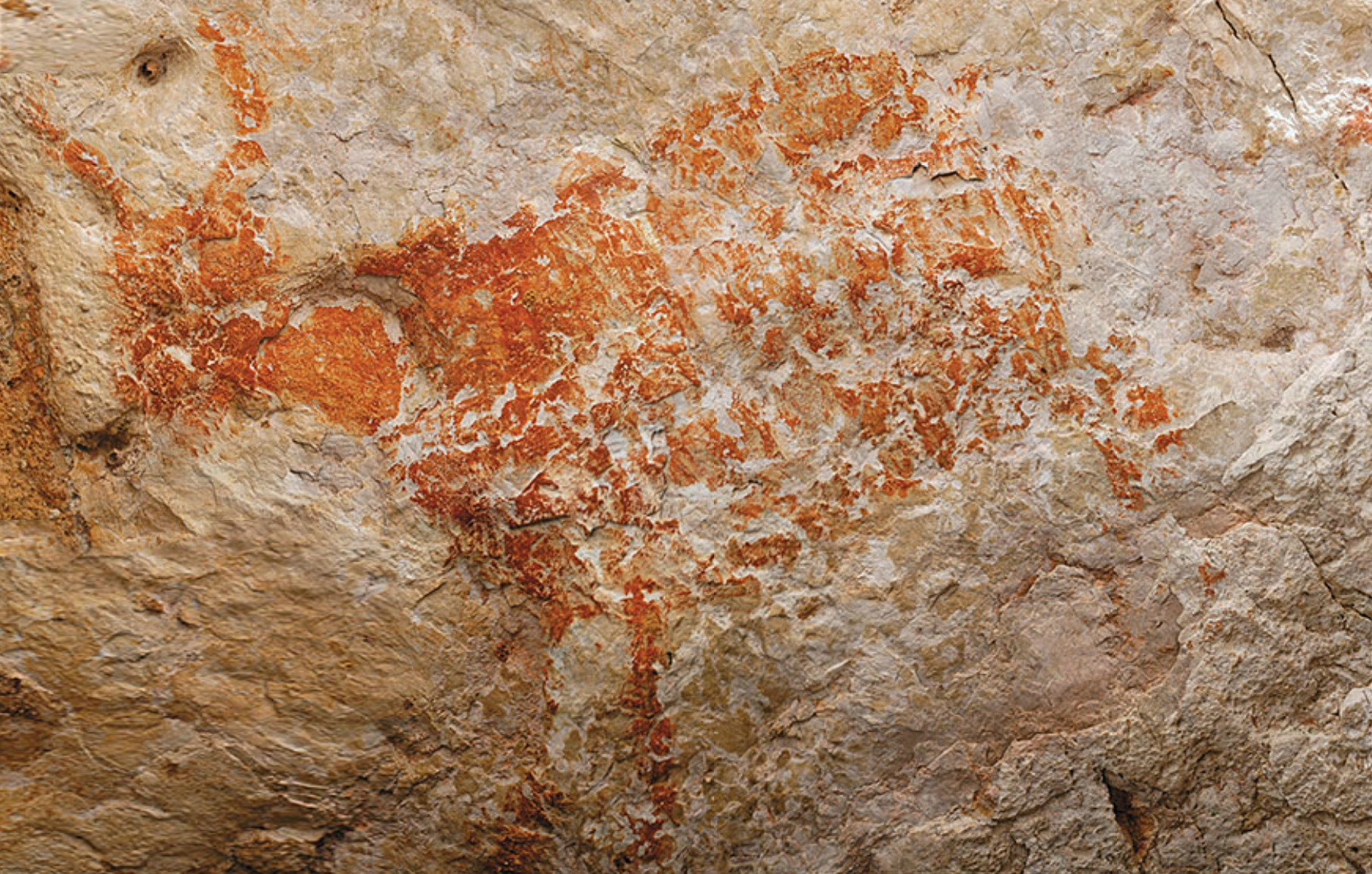
A prehistoric animal figure in the Lubang Jeriji Saléh cave, estimated to be more than 40,000 years old.

The island of Java has yielded numerous hominin fossils generally attributed to Homo erectus, including remains discovered by Eugène Dubois at Trinil. Stone artefacts on Flores show that hominins had reached the island by at least 1.02 million years ago. Homo sapiens had dispersed into Southeast Asia by at least 50,000 years ago. In Sulawesi, a cave painting showing human-like figures and a pig has been dated to a minimum age of 51,200 years. Flores also yielded remains of the small-bodied hominin Homo floresiensis. Megalithic traditions later developed at different times across the archipelago, and stone monuments were used for burials and to honour or commemorate ancestors.

Beginning in the third millennium BCE, Austronesian-speaking communities moved south from Taiwan through the Philippines and into the Indonesian archipelago, where related languages spread across most of the islands. Settlement and subsistence practices varied across the islands, with communities combining fishing, hunting, gathering and cultivation. From around 500 BCE, regional trading networks increasingly connected the archipelago with South and East Asia. Goods, knowledge and technologies circulated through these networks, and, during the early centuries CE, some coastal communities in Borneo, Sumatra, and Java developed into trading ports. Indian merchants and religious specialists brought Hindu and Buddhist practices to the archipelago, and some local rulers adopted Indian royal titles and used Sanskrit in inscriptions.

Srivijaya, founded in southeastern Sumatra in the late 7th century, grew as a maritime trading polity and a centre of Buddhist learning and religious networks. In central Java, rulers supported the construction of major religious monuments between the 8th and 10th centuries, including the Buddhist Borobudur and Hindu Prambanan temple complexes. Majapahit emerged in eastern Java in the late 13th century after Raden Wijaya used a Mongol expedition to defeat his rivals and then forced the Mongols to withdraw. Its rulers claimed authority over ports across the archipelago, but beyond Java much of this influence depended on tributary relationships and ceremonial recognition rather than direct rule.

By the late 13th century, Muslim rule had been established in northern Sumatra. Marco Polo reported that Perlak was a Muslim town during his visit in 1292, and a royal tomb at Pasai dated 1297 records a Muslim ruler there. The sultanate of Samudera Pasai became an important pepper port and a major centre for Islamic learning. Islam spread further through maritime trading networks, with Muslim communities becoming established at ports along Java's north coast and elsewhere in the archipelago. Majapahit declined during the 15th century, and Demak emerged as an independent north-coast sultanate and an important centre of Javanese Islam. Javanese traditions credit the Wali Sanga, a group of nine saints, with spreading Islam in Java, but historical evidence about their lives and activities is limited. Islamic practice there also incorporated elements of older Javanese culture.

=== European contact and colonial rule ===
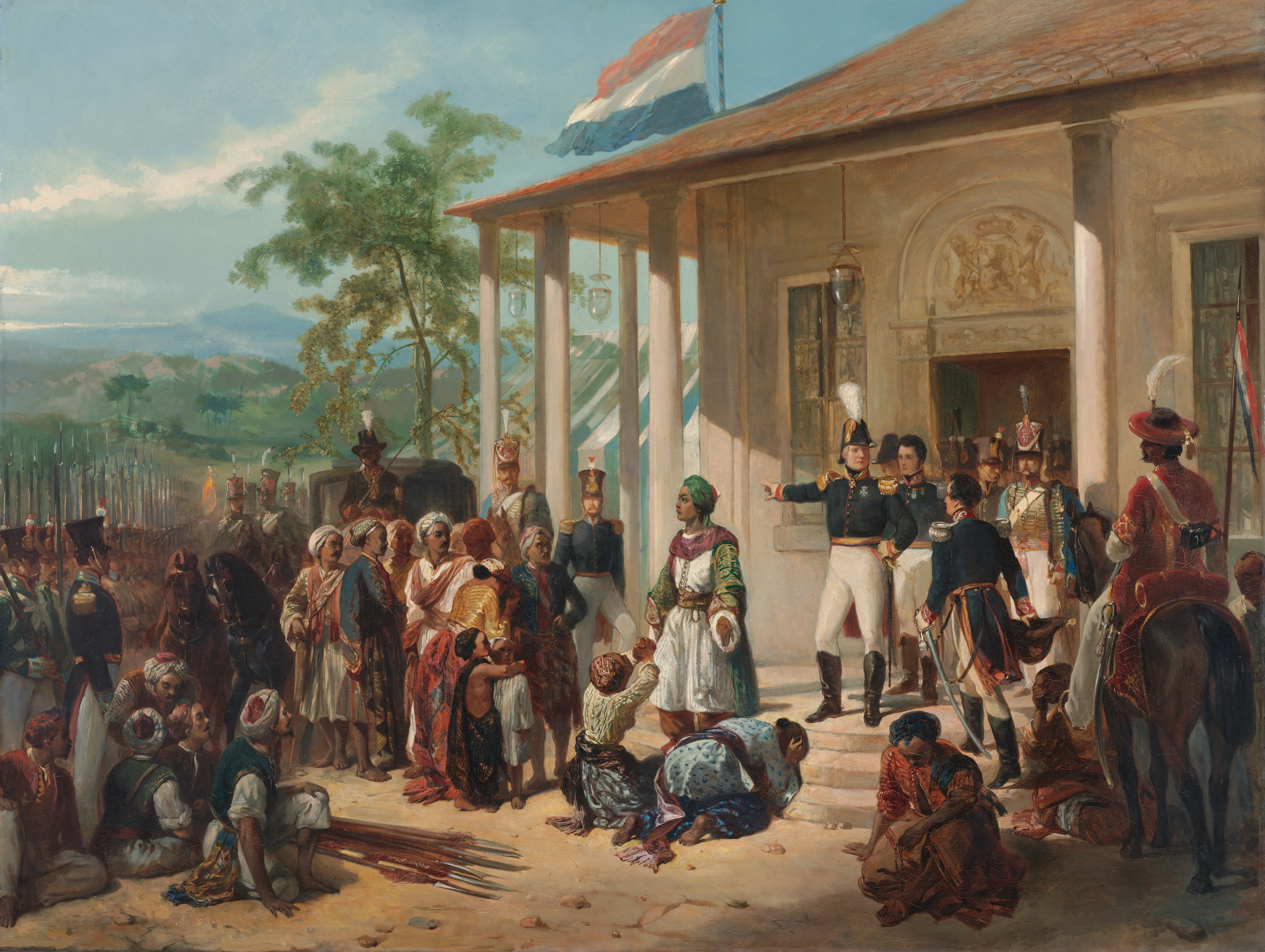
An 1835 painting of the submission of Prince Diponegoro to General De Kock at the end of the Java War in 1830

Before European arrival, spices from Maluku were already traded through Asian maritime networks in which Javanese and other regional merchants participated. The island sultanates of Ternate and Tidore became regional powers during the 15th century. The Portuguese captured the trading port of Malacca in 1511 and reached Maluku the following year, where they sought control of the spice trade. Dutch expeditions followed in the 1590s, and in 1602 competing Dutch companies were merged into the Dutch East India Company (Vereenigde Oost-Indische Compagnie, VOC). Its charter authorised it to wage war, build fortresses, and conclude treaties in Asia.

In the 17th century, local states continued to expand, including the Mataram Sultanate across much of Java and the Gowa Sultanate on the southern peninsula of Sulawesi, where the port of Makassar became a major trading centre. In 1619, the VOC captured Jayakarta (present-day Jakarta) and renamed it Batavia. It developed as an administrative and commercial centre and attracted Chinese migrants and others from the archipelago. Over the next two centuries, the VOC imposed monopolies to control the spice trade and expanded its influence in Java through military campaigns and intervention in local disputes. The VOC was dissolved in 1800 after going bankrupt, and its possessions passed to the Dutch government. During the Napoleonic Wars, British forces captured Java in 1811, but the island was returned to the Dutch in 1816.

In the 19th century, Dutch power expanded across the archipelago, meeting resistance in the Java War and in Sumatra during the Padri War and Aceh War. The Dutch established an outpost in western New Guinea in 1828 but abandoned it in 1836 and began permanent occupation only after 1898. In Bali, a series of Dutch campaigns against the independent kingdoms began in 1846 and culminated in 1908. By the early 20th century, military campaigns and boundary agreements had established Dutch control over a territory that largely corresponded to present-day Indonesia, known then as the Netherlands Indies. The colonial administration ruled several territories directly and governed others through local states whose rulers retained limited authority under Dutch supremacy.

In Java, the Dutch had introduced the Cultivation System in 1830, requiring villagers to devote part of their land and labour to government-designated crops as payment for land tax. Criticism of the system helped establish colonial policy as a subject of public debate in the Netherlands. In 1901, the Dutch government adopted the Ethical Policy, which aimed to improve welfare in the colony. The policy established primary schools teaching in local languages and expanded irrigation and other public services. Western-style schooling also expanded, but it reached only a small minority of the population. In 1905, the colonial government also began resettling people from Java to less densely populated islands.

=== Emergence of Indonesia and independence ===
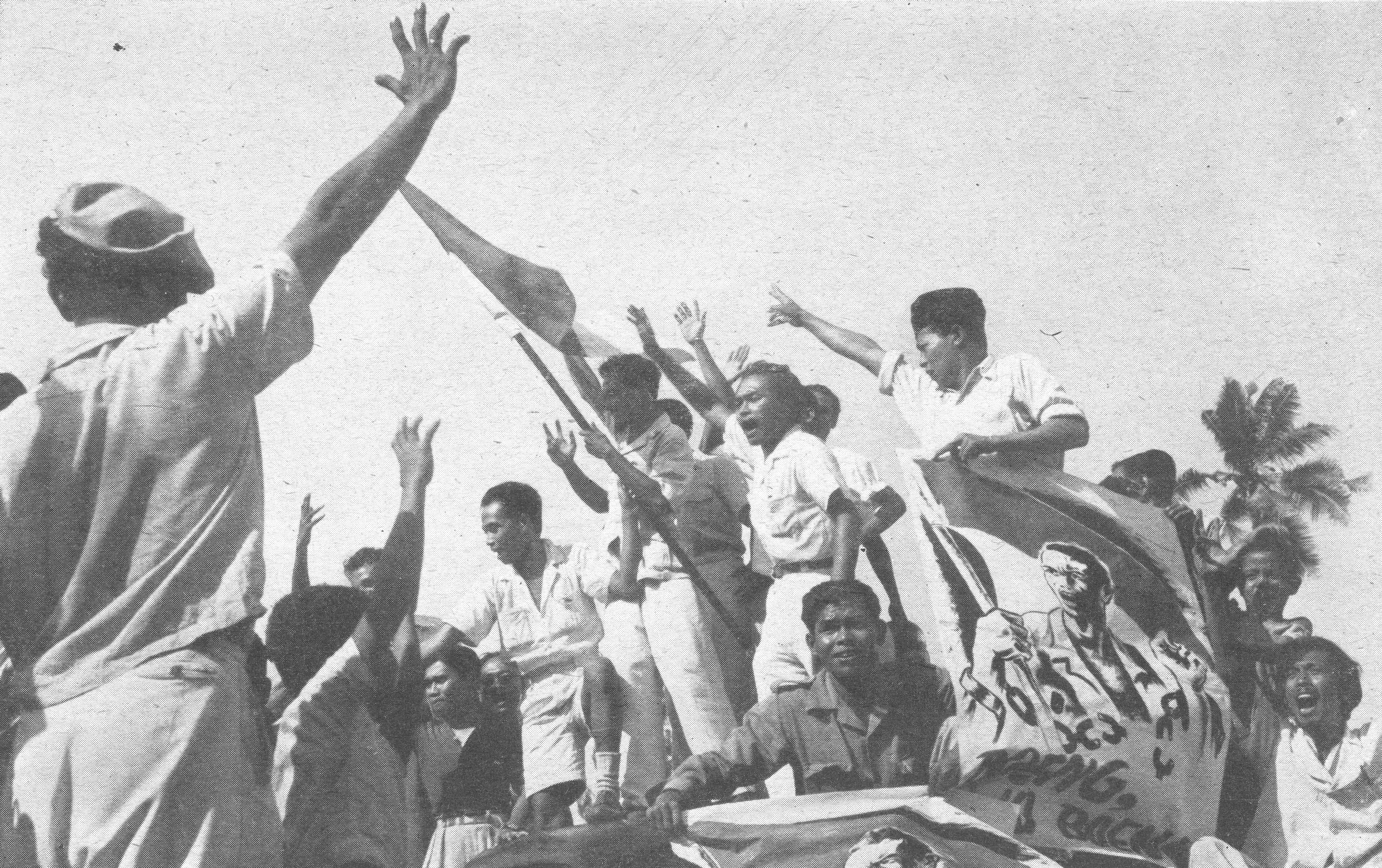
Indonesian nationalists riding through the streets, November 1945

Colonial education, despite its limited reach, helped produce an educated elite who became active in the emerging nationalist movements. Several political organisations were founded during this period, including the Javanese cultural organisation Budi Utomo and the mass Islamic movement Sarekat Islam, followed by the Communist Party of Indonesia (PKI) and the Indonesian National Party. During the 1920s, a shared national identity began to develop through youth associations and a growing body of literature in Malay, which for centuries had been used for communication between different ethnic groups. Intellectuals increasingly called the language Bahasa Indonesia and made it a common medium for the emerging nation. The Youth Pledge in 1928 recognised it as the "language of unity", alongside the ideals of one homeland and one nation, Indonesia.

The Great Depression reached the colony in the early 1930s, bringing severe economic hardship and increasing fears among colonial authorities that discontent could strengthen radical nationalist movements. Restrictions on nationalist activity became stricter, and by the mid-1930s, Sukarno, Mohammad Hatta, Sutan Sjahrir, and other nationalist leaders who rejected cooperation with colonial authorities had either been imprisoned or exiled. In 1942, Dutch colonial rule collapsed following the Japanese conquest of the colony during the Pacific War.

Japanese occupation imposed martial law, banned political parties and mobilised Indonesians through Japanese-sponsored civil and quasi-military organisations. Wartime shortages and forced labour caused widespread hardship, but the ban on the Dutch language strengthened the public use of the Indonesian language. Japanese-organised military units, including PETA on Java and the Giyugun on Sumatra, trained tens of thousands of Indonesians. On 7 August 1945, Japanese authorities authorised preparations for an Indonesian state planned for September, which would remain under Japanese military supervision.

However, Japan surrendered to the Allies on 15 August 1945. Two days later, Sukarno proclaimed Indonesian independence, with Hatta co-signing the declaration. They were named president and vice-president on 18 August. Dutch attempts to restore colonial rule led to a four-year military and diplomatic struggle. International opposition to the Netherlands intensified after Dutch forces captured Yogyakarta in a December 1948 offensive, and the United States subsequently pressed the Dutch into negotiations recommended by the United Nations. On 27 December 1949, the Netherlands transferred sovereignty to the federal United States of Indonesia, except over western New Guinea. The federal states soon joined the Republic, and Indonesia was proclaimed a unitary state on 17 August 1950.

=== Sukarno era and Suharto's New Order ===
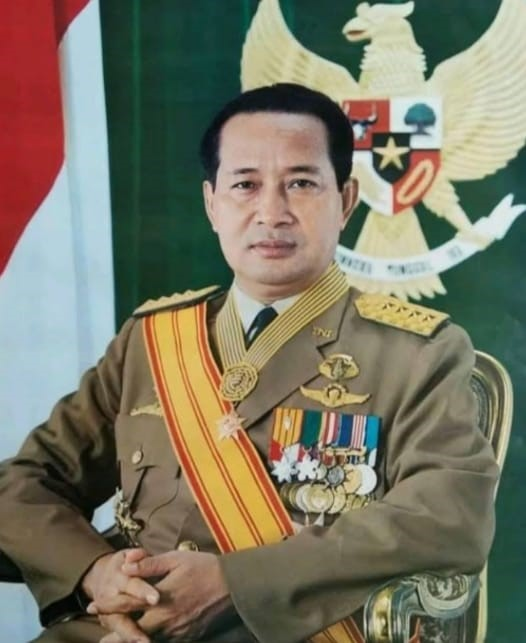
Sukarno (left) and Suharto (right), Indonesia's first two presidents

Indonesia adopted a parliamentary system of government under the 1950 provisional constitution. The early republic faced armed opposition from the Darul Islam rebellion, whose supporters aimed to establish an Islamic state. The dispute over western New Guinea strained relations between Indonesia and the Netherlands, which refused to negotiate its transfer to Indonesian control. In February 1958, dissidents in West Sumatra proclaimed a rival government before being joined by rebels in Sulawesi. They were seeking reforms to the republic rather than separation but were defeated by the central government. After the Constituent Assembly failed to secure the required majority for a permanent constitution, Sukarno dissolved it by decree in 1959 and restored the 1945 Constitution.

This established Guided Democracy, a system characterised by dominant presidential authority, less regional autonomy and a reduced role for political parties. Under this system, Sukarno expanded the military's political role while supporting the growing PKI as a counterweight. He also promoted state enterprises and import substitution, even as foreign investment declined, inflation soared and shortages of consumer goods worsened by the mid-1960s. The western New Guinea dispute culminated in the US-mediated New York Agreement in 1962, and Indonesia administered the territory in May 1963. In January 1963, Sukarno pursued Konfrontasi, opposing the formation of Malaysia through diplomatic pressure and armed incursions into its territory.

After military officers belonging to the 30 September Movement killed six generals in 1965, forces of Major General Suharto took control of Jakarta, and the military presented the movement as an attempted coup d'etat by the PKI. The ensuing anti-communist campaign spread across the country, with army units working alongside or directing civilian groups. At least 500,000 people were killed over a few months, and hundreds of thousands of others were detained. (Note: Estimates range from about 200,000 to one million. At least 500,000 killed is the widely accepted figure.) The campaign destroyed the PKI and shifted power to the military. In March 1966, Sukarno signed an order known as Supersemar, authorising Suharto to restore order and giving him de facto control over key executive and security powers. Suharto became President in 1968, and Sukarno died in 1970.

Suharto's "New Order" restricted political organisation, embedded the military in government, and used Golkar, an organisation backed by the military and civil service, to dominate elections in a tightly controlled party system. The Act of Free Choice in 1969 formally incorporated western New Guinea into Indonesia, but just over a thousand selected community leaders took part in it amid reports of military intimidation. Many Papuans opposed this integration and have waged an armed resistance since then. In 1975, Indonesia invaded Portuguese Timor and annexed it the following year. (Note: Timor-Leste's truth commission estimated at least 102,800 conflict-related civilian deaths between 1974 and 1999, mostly from hunger and illness.) Hasan di Tiro founded the Free Aceh Movement in 1976 and proclaimed Aceh's independence from Indonesia. The insurgency there was largely suppressed by 1979 but revived in 1989 after the return of fighters trained in Libya, prompting a military campaign lasting a decade.

The New Order encouraged renewed foreign investment and sought foreign aid while pursuing industrialisation through state development plans. From the 1970s, the regime greatly expanded the transmigration programme, resettling families from Java to other islands. Manufacturing expanded and the number of people below the official poverty line fell substantially by the mid-1990s. At the same time, large business groups connected to Suharto's family and close associates accumulated wealth through state patronage and political protection. The Asian financial crisis of 1997–98 caused a sharp economic downturn, followed by protests and riots in May 1998, culminating in Suharto's resignation.

=== Reformasi and contemporary Indonesia ===
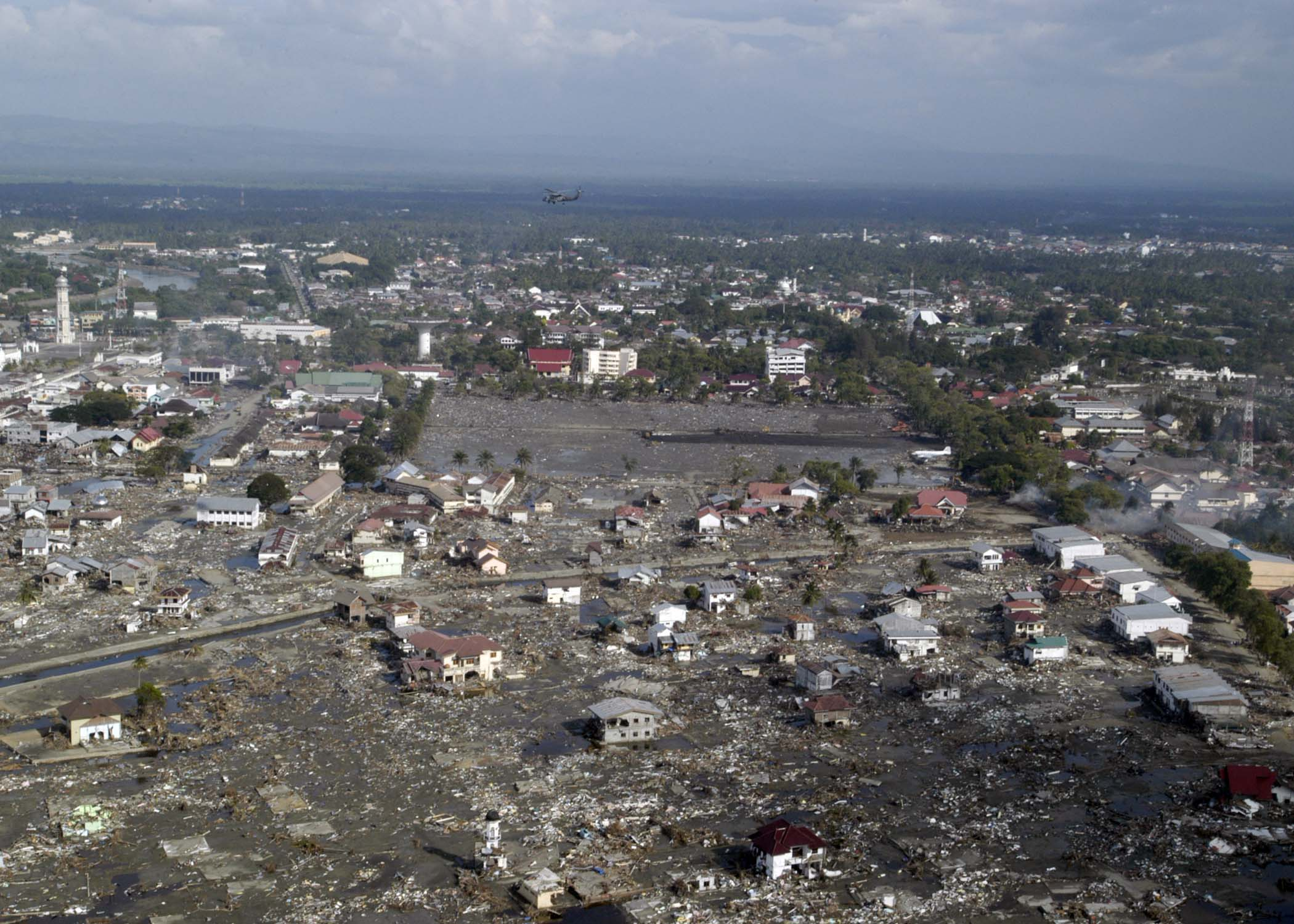
Damage following the earthquake and subsequent tsunami in Banda Aceh, January 2005

The post-Suharto transition was marked by civil unrest, including the conflict between Christians and Muslims in Maluku and violence against Madurese communities in Kalimantan. The ensuing period of political reform, known as Reformasi, brought constitutional amendments, competitive elections, and a transfer of authority from the central government to local administrations. President B. J. Habibie relaxed restrictions on the press and political parties and oversaw the 1999 general election and the independence referendum in East Timor. (Note: In that referendum in 1999, a majority of people in East Timor voted against remaining part of Indonesia. The Indonesian military then responded with violence throughout the province. East Timor later became the independent country of Timor-Leste in 2002.) Decentralisation began in 2001 under President Abdurrahman Wahid, while constitutional amendments were completed in 2002 during Megawati Sukarnoputri's presidency. One of the amendments paved the way for direct presidential elections.

The military lost the seats once reserved for its representatives in parliament, but it continued to influence government. New democratic institutions were established, but powerful political and business elites continued to exercise influence through patronage networks. Former general Susilo Bambang Yudhoyono won the first direct presidential election in 2004. His administration reached a peace agreement with Aceh separatists in 2005 after the previous year's Indian Ocean tsunami brought more international attention to the province. After a series of bombings by Islamist militant groups in the 2000s, large-scale attacks declined by the early 2010s, though smaller attacks continued.

Joko Widodo, popularly called Jokowi, was elected president in 2014 and prioritised infrastructure and economic development, which he linked to improving welfare. Indonesia remained an electoral democracy, but the quality of its democracy declined amid weakened parliamentary opposition and oversight, curbs on dissent, reduced independence of the anti-corruption commission, and Jokowi's intervention in the 2024 election. Under his successor Prabowo Subianto, the government pursued ambitious plans for public spending and revised the law governing the armed forces in 2025, which allowed more active officers to serve in civilian posts.

== Geography ==
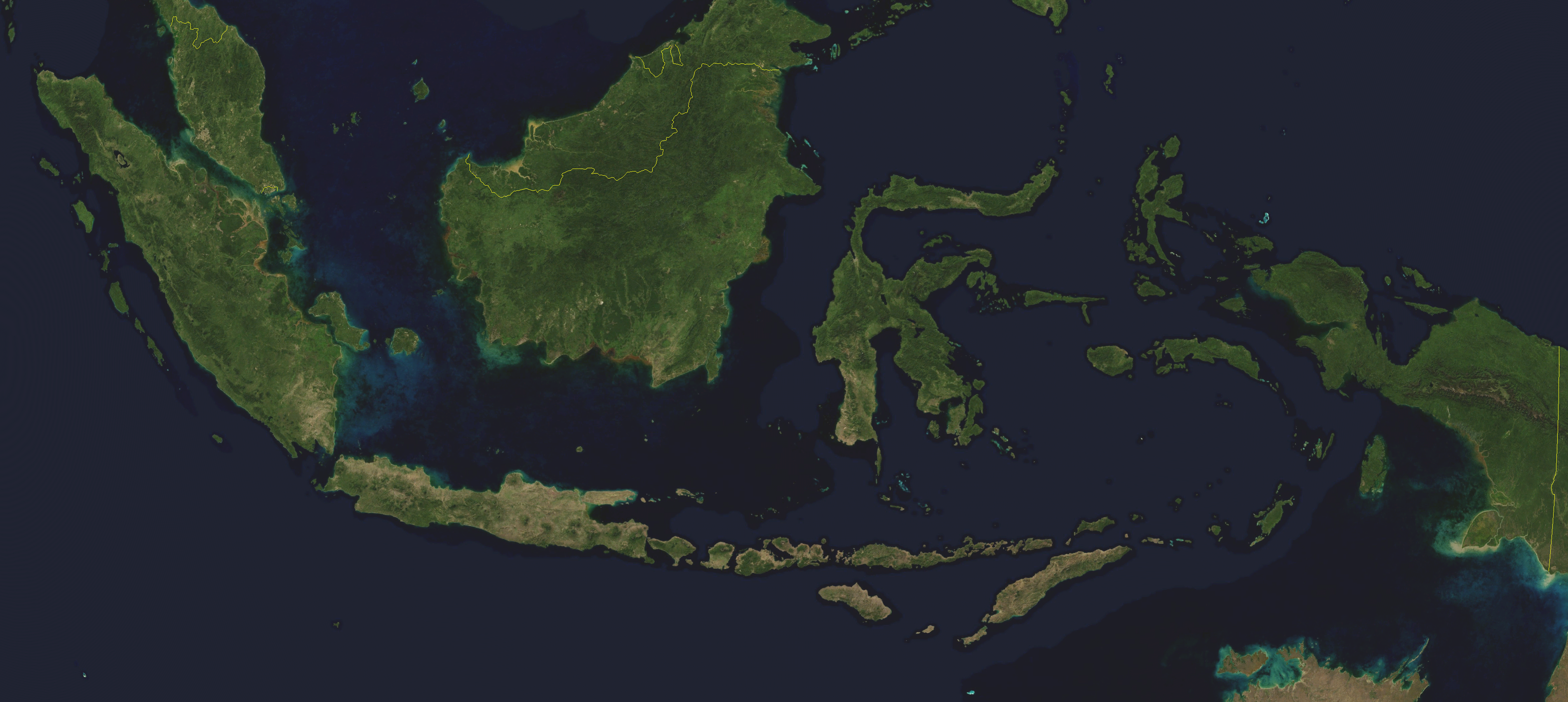
A satellite image of the Indonesian archipelago

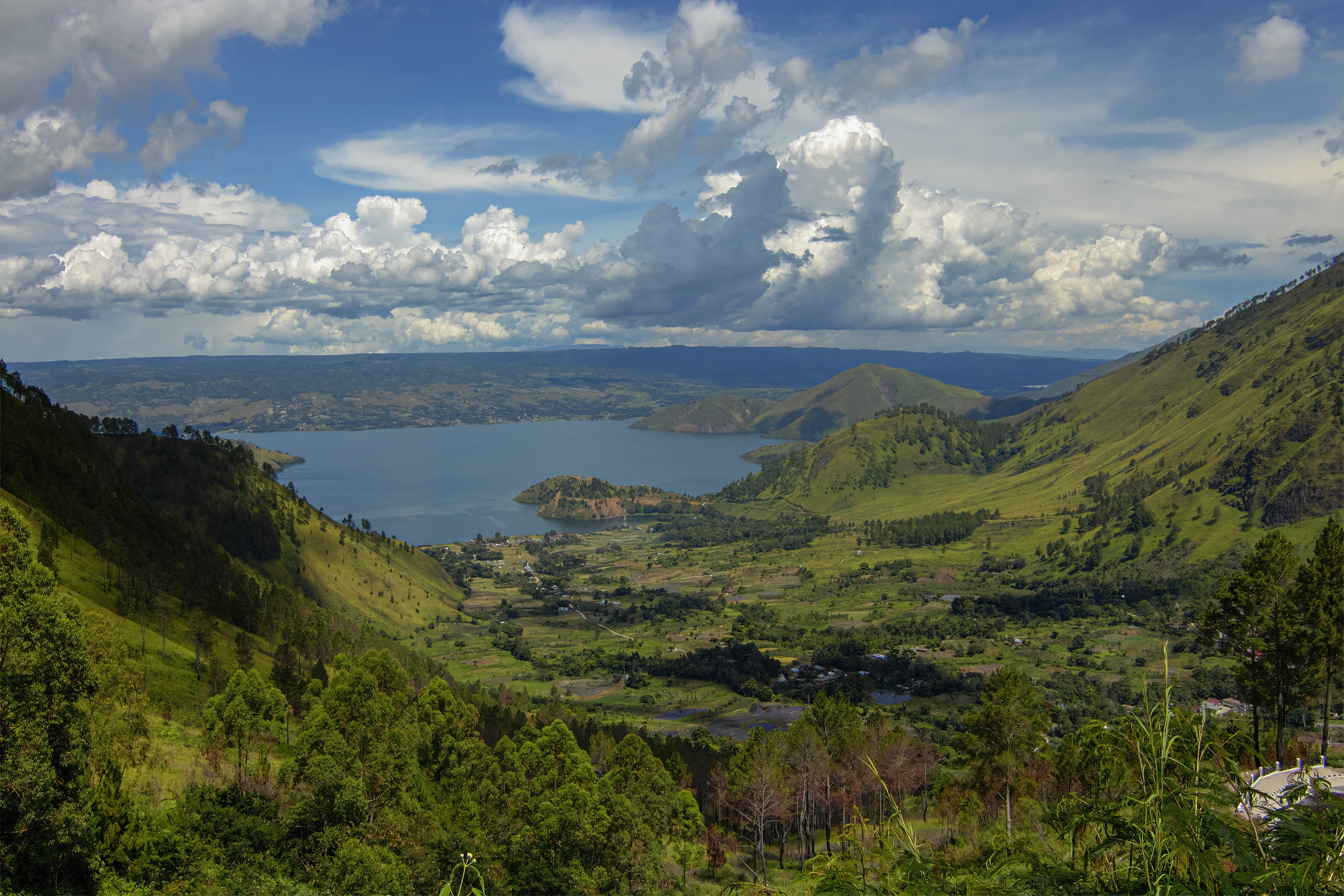
Indonesia lies within one of the most tectonically active regions on Earth. Pictured above is Lake Toba in North Sumatra, one of the world's largest volcanic calderas.

Indonesia is an equatorial archipelago of coastal plains, mountains, and volcanic islands. The country lies between latitudes 11°S and 6°N and longitudes 95°E and 141°E. It is the world's largest country made up only of islands, extending 5,120 kilometres (3,181 mi) from east to west across three time zones and 1,760 kilometres (1,094 mi) from north to south. Indonesia shares land borders with Papua New Guinea, Timor-Leste, and Malaysia, as well as maritime borders with seven other countries, including Australia, Singapore, and the Philippines. Several straits in the archipelago, including Malacca, Sunda, and Lombok, are strategic shipping routes between the Indian and Pacific oceans.

Indonesia's archipelagic and territorial waters cover more area than its land, and its exclusive economic zone (EEZ) gives it rights over marine resources farther offshore. (Note: Indonesia's maritime waters include approximately 3,110,000 km^{2} (1,200,000 sq mi) of internal and archipelagic waters and 290,000 km^{2} (110,000 sq mi) of territorial sea, while its EEZ covers about 3,000,000 km^{2} (1,200,000 sq mi).) The country is recognised as an archipelagic state under the United Nations Convention on the Law of the Sea, allowing it to draw straight baselines connecting its outermost islands and exercise sovereignty over the enclosed waters, subject to the navigational rights of other countries. (Note: This legal status has its origins in the Djuanda Declaration of 1957 by then Prime Minister Djuanda Kartawidjaja, through which Indonesia first asserted sovereignty over the waters between its islands.) Indonesia has designated three north–south archipelagic sea-lane systems for international navigation through the waters between its islands, while passage rights continue along other normally used routes.

The number of Indonesian islands varies by counting method, with published figures ranging from 13,000 to as high as 25,000. The most widely cited official count places the total at 17,508 islands, with about 6,000 of them inhabited. Its five main islands are Sumatra, Java, Sulawesi, Borneo, and New Guinea. Indonesia occupies most of Borneo, known locally as Kalimantan, and shares the island with Brunei and Malaysia. It also occupies the western part of New Guinea, commonly called Papua, while Papua New Guinea occupies the eastern part.

Java occupies less than 7% of Indonesia's land area but is its most populous island, with intensive farming and extensive urban growth. Forest cover differs considerably, with larger forested areas in Papua and Maluku than in Java and Bali. At 4,884 metres (16,024 ft), Puncak Jaya on New Guinea is Indonesia's highest peak, while Lake Toba on Sumatra is its largest lake. In Kalimantan, major waterways like the Kapuas, Barito, and Mahakam rivers have historically served as corridors for movement and trade between communities in the interior and those near the coast.

Indonesia lies along the boundaries of the Eurasian, India-Australia, and Pacific-Philippine sea tectonic plates. In some areas, one plate moves beneath another, a process known as subduction that causes frequent earthquakes and volcanic activity. The resulting volcanic belt contains at least 127 active volcanoes. This tectonic setting exposes the archipelago to major earthquake and tsunami hazards. The Sumatra earthquake in 2004 generated a tsunami that caused widespread destruction in Aceh. The Toba super-eruption about 74,000 years ago is one of the largest known eruptions in Earth's history, and the 1815 eruption of Mount Tambora was followed by global cooling and unusually cold weather in Europe and northeastern North America during the Year Without a Summer in 1816.

=== Climate ===
Rain clouds over Indonesia during the monsoon season, observed by the Himawari-8 weather satellite in March 2020.

Indonesia's equatorial position and monsoon winds give it a tropical climate. Most lowland areas are warm and humid throughout the year, while higher terrain is cooler, and seasonal temperature differences are small. Seasonal changes in the monsoon generally bring wetter conditions from November to April and drier conditions from May to October, but their timing and intensity vary by region. Much of the country has a tropical rainforest climate, with tropical monsoon and savanna climates occurring where dry seasons are more pronounced. Seasonal rainfall affects rice-planting schedules and the risk of droughts, floods, and fires.

Western Sumatra, western Java, and portions of Kalimantan and Papua receive the highest annual rainfall, whereas Nusa Tenggara, the island group east of Java and closer to Australia, experiences a much drier climate. The surrounding oceans, island geography, monsoon winds, and topography all affect where and when rain falls. In drought-prone regions of the country, reduced rainfall and prolonged dry periods can cause water shortages and crop losses, particularly during El Niño, a recurring period of unusually warm waters in the tropical Pacific.

Indonesia already faces climate-related hazards. Climate projections indicate further warming and sea-level rise, changes in rainfall patterns, and greater risks from extreme heat and flooding. These changes affect agriculture, water resources, public health, coastal settlements and wildfire management. Sea-level rise is especially relevant to coastal areas, where much of the population and infrastructure are located. The country is among the largest emitters of greenhouse gases. It has committed to achieving net-zero greenhouse gas emissions by 2060, but coal still supplies most of its electricity despite growth in renewable generation.

=== Biodiversity and conservation ===
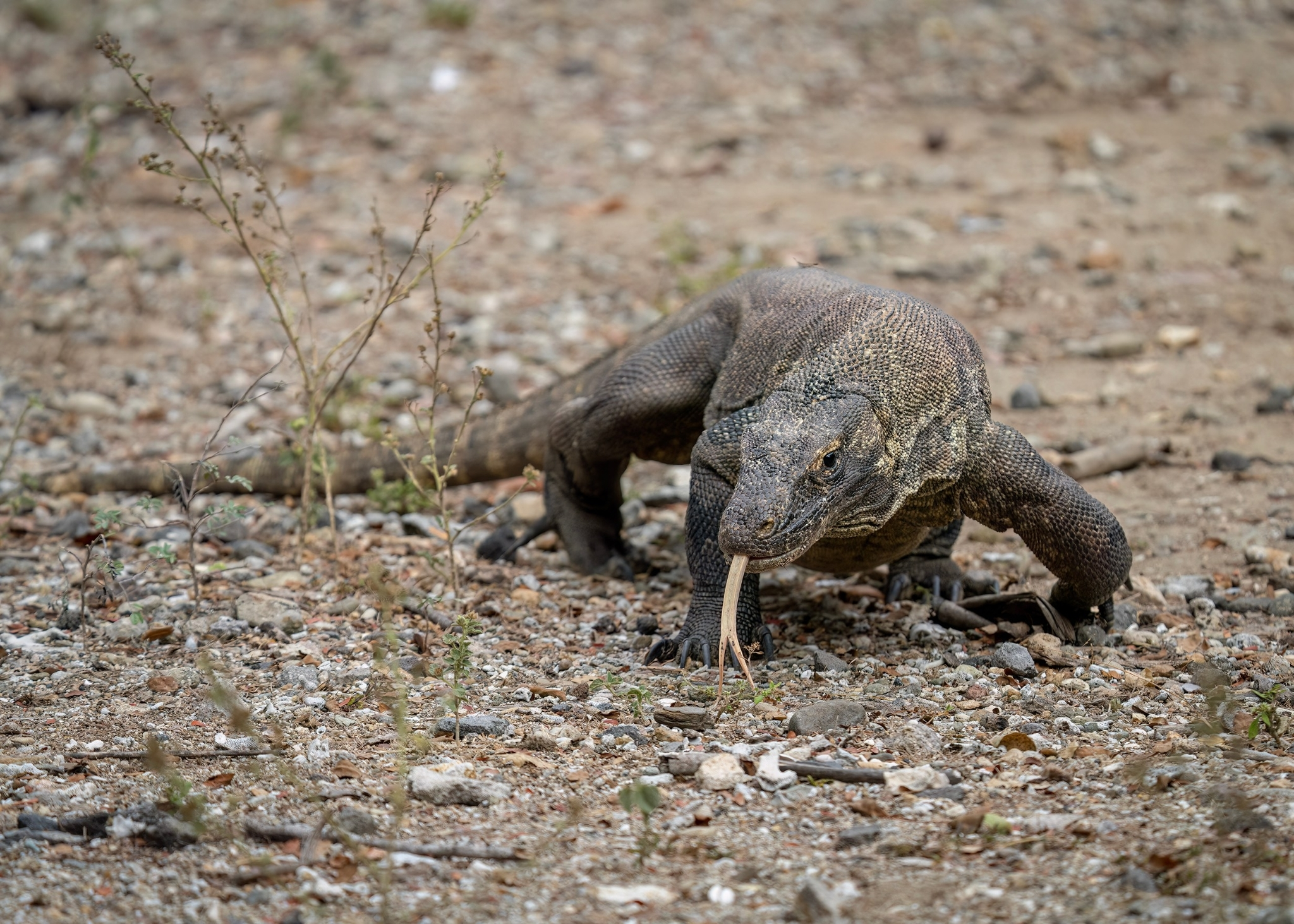
The Komodo dragon (Varanus komodoensis) is one of Indonesia's officially designated national animals.

Indonesia is among the 17 countries identified as megadiverse by Conservation International, a classification for countries with exceptionally high biodiversity. Its many islands and geological history have helped produce a diverse flora and fauna. The islands of Wallacea, including Sulawesi, the Maluku Islands and much of Nusa Tenggara, lie between the Asian and Australian faunal regions and support many species found nowhere else. In 2015, an estimated 83% of Southeast Asia's old-growth forest was in Indonesia. Mangrove forests, coral reefs and seagrass beds make up much of the coastal ecosystems.

Large oil palm and timber plantations were estimated to account for more than 40% of national deforestation between 2001 and 2016. Conversion of forest land for farming, roads, and other development breaks up remaining habitat, which affects species populations, habitat quality, and biodiversity. Carbon-rich peatlands are vulnerable to fires after drainage, especially during droughts. Forest and peatland fires produce haze that affects public health in Indonesia and neighbouring countries, including Malaysia and Singapore. At sea, coral diversity has been found to be lower on reefs damaged by pollution or anchors. A study of 32 locations found that the area covered by living coral was largely stable at most, but some reefs exposed to severe ocean heat suffered substantial losses.

Indonesia has designated 554 protected areas covering 27 million hectares, equivalent to 14% of its land area. Assessments conducted in 2015, 2017 and 2019 found improvements in management scores but identified poaching, illegal logging, human settlements, tourism and non-timber cultivation as the main threats to protected areas. The country's social forestry programme aims to give Indigenous and other local communities greater rights to manage their forests, but complex procedures and implementation problems have limited participation.

== Government and politics ==
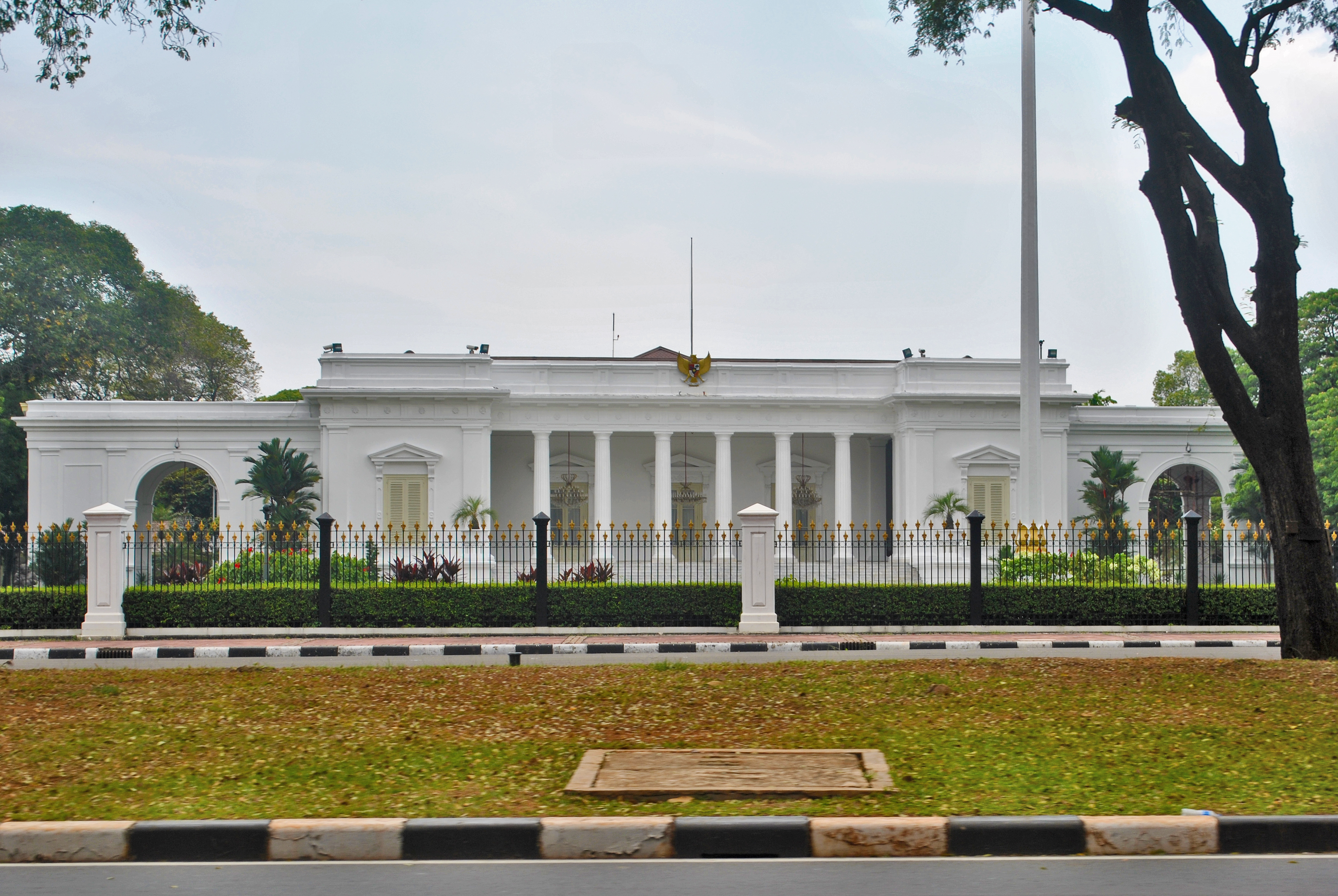
Merdeka Palace, the official residence of the President of Indonesia

Indonesia is a unitary republic with a presidential system under the 1945 Constitution. Following the fall of Suharto in 1998, four constitutional amendments between 1999 and 2002 introduced direct presidential elections, established new state institutions and reduced the powers of the People's Consultative Assembly (MPR). The amendments also gave regional autonomy a constitutional basis, while decentralisation laws granted provincial, regency and city governments greater authority to make local regulations.

The president serves as head of state and government, commands the armed forces, and may serve no more than two five-year terms. The MPR comprises elected members of the House of Representatives (DPR) and the Regional Representative Council (DPD). The DPR makes laws jointly with the president and exercises budgetary and oversight powers, while the DPD represents the provinces and may propose and discuss legislation concerning regional affairs but cannot give final approval to laws. The MPR can amend the constitution, inaugurate the president and vice-president, and remove them through constitutional procedures.

Indonesia's legal system is based largely on civil law inherited from Dutch rule, alongside customary (adat) and Islamic legal traditions. Judicial power is exercised by the Supreme Court and its subordinate general, religious, military and administrative courts, alongside the Constitutional Court. The Supreme Court hears final appeals and reviews regulations below the level of statutes. The Constitutional Court reviews laws for constitutionality and adjudicates disputes over state powers, political parties and election results. It also determines whether allegations against the president or vice-president meet the constitutional grounds for impeachment. The Religious Courts hear cases involving marriage, divorce, inheritance and certain transactions governed by Islamic law. The Judicial Commission proposes candidates for the Supreme Court and oversees judicial conduct.

=== Parties and elections ===
Prabowo Subianto
President

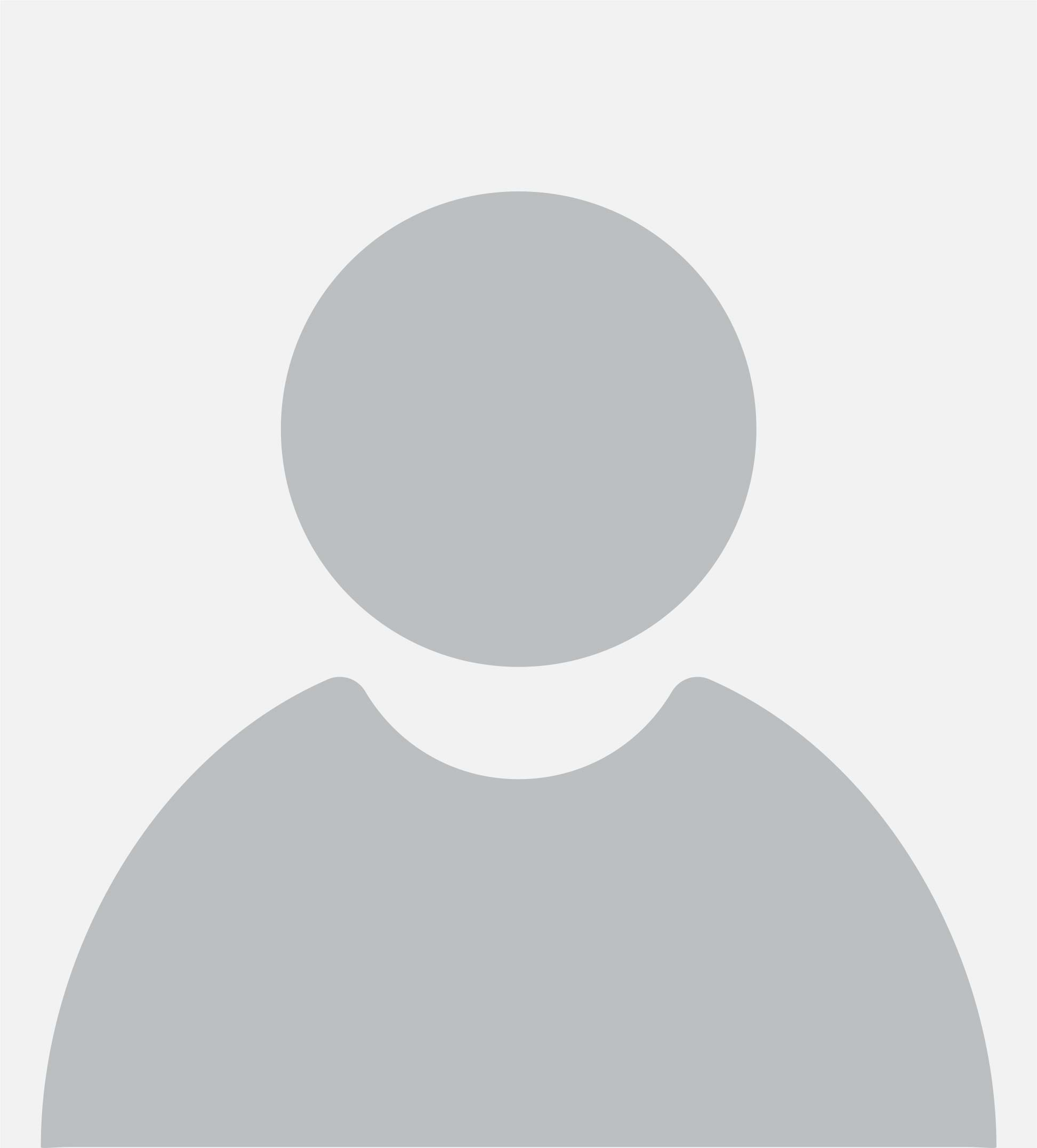
Vacant
Vice President

Since the return to competitive elections in 1999, Indonesia has had a multi-party system. No party has won a majority in legislative elections, and presidents have generally formed broad governing coalitions, often appointing ministers from parties beyond their own.

Political parties have disagreed over the role of Islam in politics and its relationship with the state, with some rooted in secular-nationalist movements and others in Islamic political traditions. (Note: PDI-P is associated with secular nationalism, while PKB and PKS are associated with traditionalist and modernist Islamic politics, respectively.) Party politics often relies more on patronage and elite power-sharing. Parties that oppose a winning presidential candidate have sometimes joined the government afterward, often gaining cabinet positions and access to state resources through these alliances.

Indonesia held its first general election in 1955. Direct presidential elections began in 2004. General elections are held every five years, with political parties contesting DPR seats and individuals standing for the DPD. The independent General Elections Commission organises general elections, a task that includes delivering ballots and equipment to remote islands, mountainous regions and places with limited transport infrastructure.

=== Administrative divisions ===
Indonesia is divided into provinces, which are further divided into regencies and cities. Under the general system, these levels are headed by governors, regents and mayors, respectively, and have elected regional legislatures. Regencies and cities are divided into districts, followed by villages (desa) or urban villages (kelurahan). Villages exercise local self-government, whereas urban villages form part of the district administration.

Decentralisation after 1998 gave provincial, regency and city governments greater authority over local affairs. Special autonomy arrangements apply to Aceh, which may implement aspects of Islamic law, and to Papua. The Special Region of Yogyakarta retains a hereditary sultan as governor, while Jakarta has special provincial autonomy as the national capital. In 2022, Nusantara in East Kalimantan was designated as the future national capital. Its formal transfer from Jakarta requires a presidential decree.

=== Foreign relations and military ===
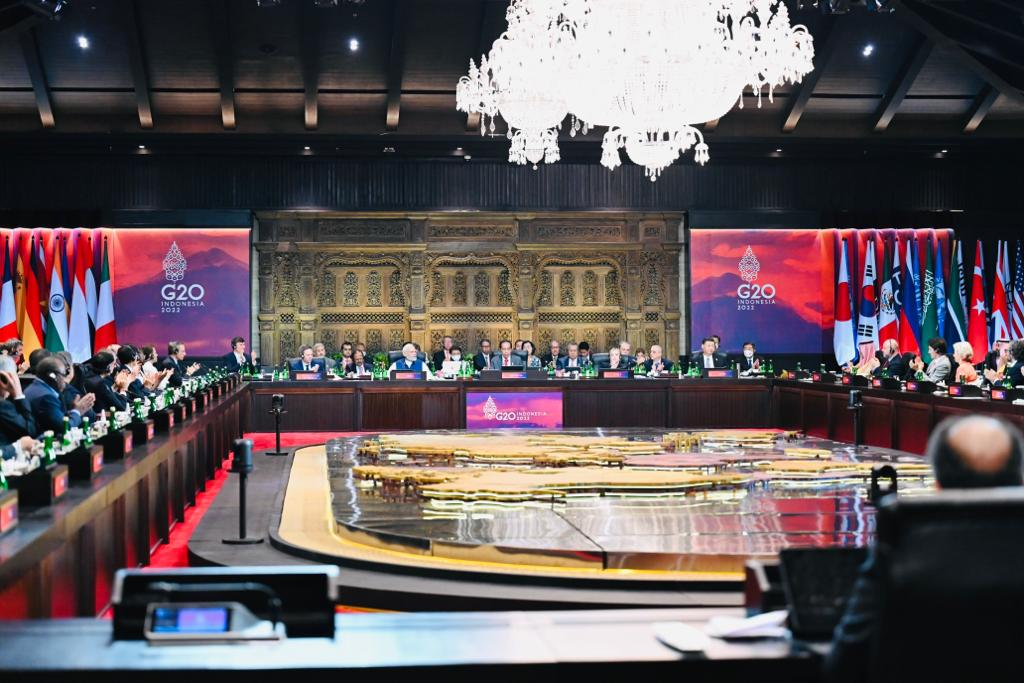
Indonesia hosted the G20 Summit in Bali, 2022. The country is the only G20 member state in Southeast Asia.

Indonesia follows an "independent and active" (bebas aktif) foreign policy, a doctrine formulated by Vice President Mohammad Hatta in 1948. The policy has emphasised non-alignment and independent action, along with a preference for diplomacy over military means in pursuing regional objectives. One early expression of this policy was promoting decolonisation with the hosting of the Bandung Conference in 1955, the precursor of the Non-Aligned Movement (NAM). As a middle power, Indonesia works through regional and multilateral institutions while preserving room to manoeuvre in its relations with major powers.

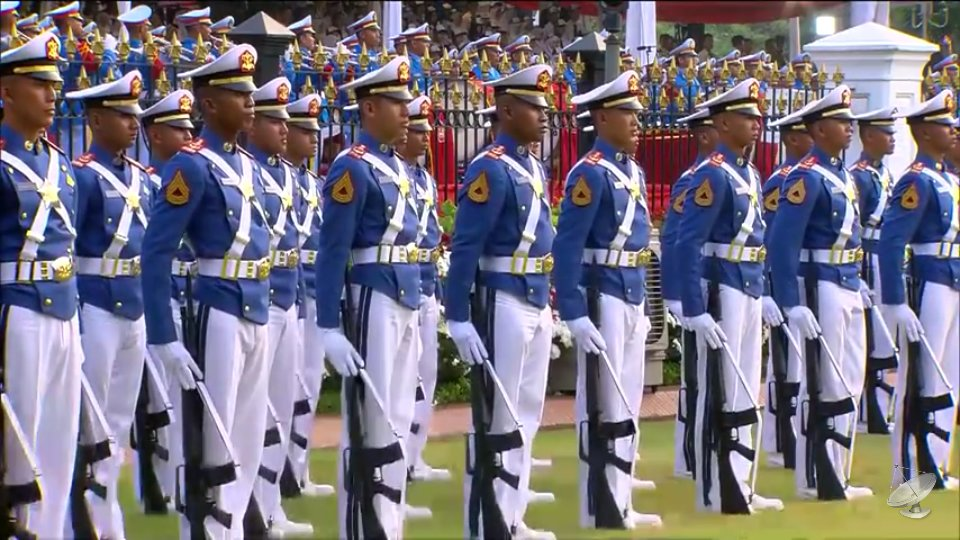
Indonesian Military Academy cadets

As a founding member of the Association of Southeast Asian Nations (ASEAN), Indonesia places the organisation at the centre of its regional diplomacy. Indonesia has broad bilateral ties with Malaysia and Singapore, including cooperation in economic, defence, and cultural fields. Relations with Australia are conducted through a Comprehensive Strategic Partnership covering several areas, including economic development and regional stability. On China–United States competition, Indonesia has avoided alliances and taking sides, emphasised an ASEAN-led regional approach and sought to limit escalation.

Indonesia has been a member of the United Nations since 1950, apart from an absence in 1965–66 during a conflict with Malaysia. It participates in multilateral forums including the NAM, G20, the Organisation of Islamic Cooperation, and the East Asia Summit. After decades as a major recipient of foreign aid, Indonesia has been providing development assistance since 2015 and established Indonesian AID in 2019 to manage overseas assistance. Since 1957, it has sent military and police personnel to UN peacekeeping missions.

The Indonesian National Armed Forces comprise the Army, Navy, and Air Force. The Navy patrols Indonesian waters and strategic shipping routes and transports forces between islands, while the Air Force undertakes air defence, reconnaissance and transport operations. The Army is the largest branch and maintains regional commands paralleling civilian administration down to the village level. Its longstanding dominance is rooted in the military's historical emphasis on internal security. The "dual function" (dwifungsi) doctrine, which gave the military political and security roles, was formally ended in 2000, and its unelected parliamentary seats were abolished by 2004. Parliament's cooperative oversight has stabilised civil–military relations, but has also hindered further reform and weakened scrutiny of defence policy.

=== Law enforcement and human rights ===
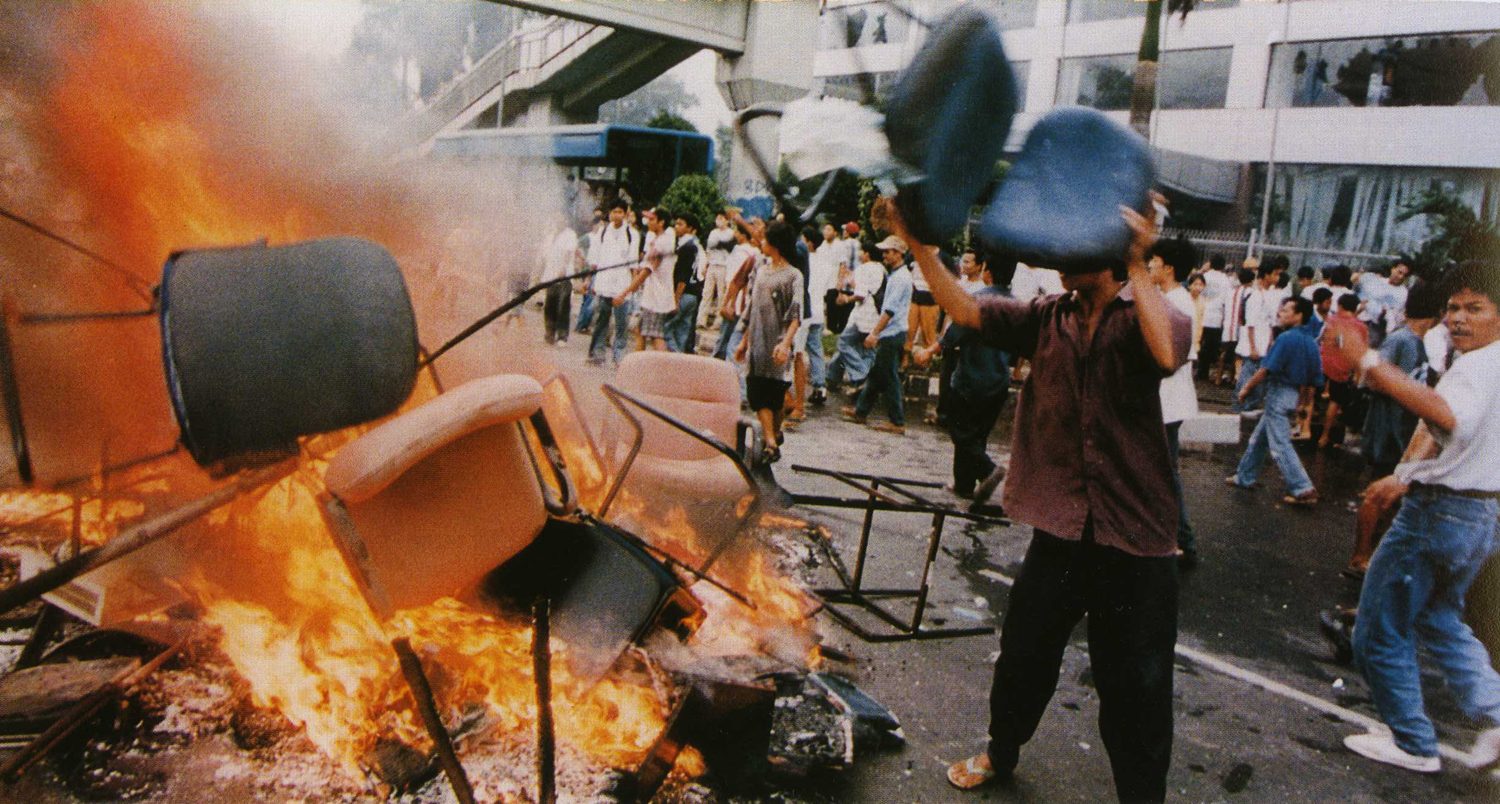
The May 1998 riots in Jakarta involved attacks on people and property that targeted Chinese Indonesians.

Law enforcement is carried out by the Indonesian National Police, whose duties include maintaining public security and order, enforcing the law, and providing protection and services to the public. The Chief of the Indonesian National Police is directly responsible to the president.

The National Commission on Human Rights (Komnas HAM) is authorised to investigate human rights violations. Accountability for past abuses has been limited. In 2024, the United Nations Human Rights Committee noted that only four of 16 cases of gross human rights violations investigated by Komnas HAM had reached court. Indonesia retains the death penalty but has not executed anyone since 2016.

Anti-Chinese racism has persisted despite the removal of most discriminatory policies after Suharto's New Order. Since 2016, anti-LGBTQ campaigns have included hostile statements by public officials, police raids and proposals for criminal restrictions. Religious practices of minority communities have also been limited by the blasphemy law. In Papua, human rights monitors have reported extrajudicial killings and disappearances, restrictions on peaceful expression, and displacement due to security operations and armed conflict.

== Economy ==
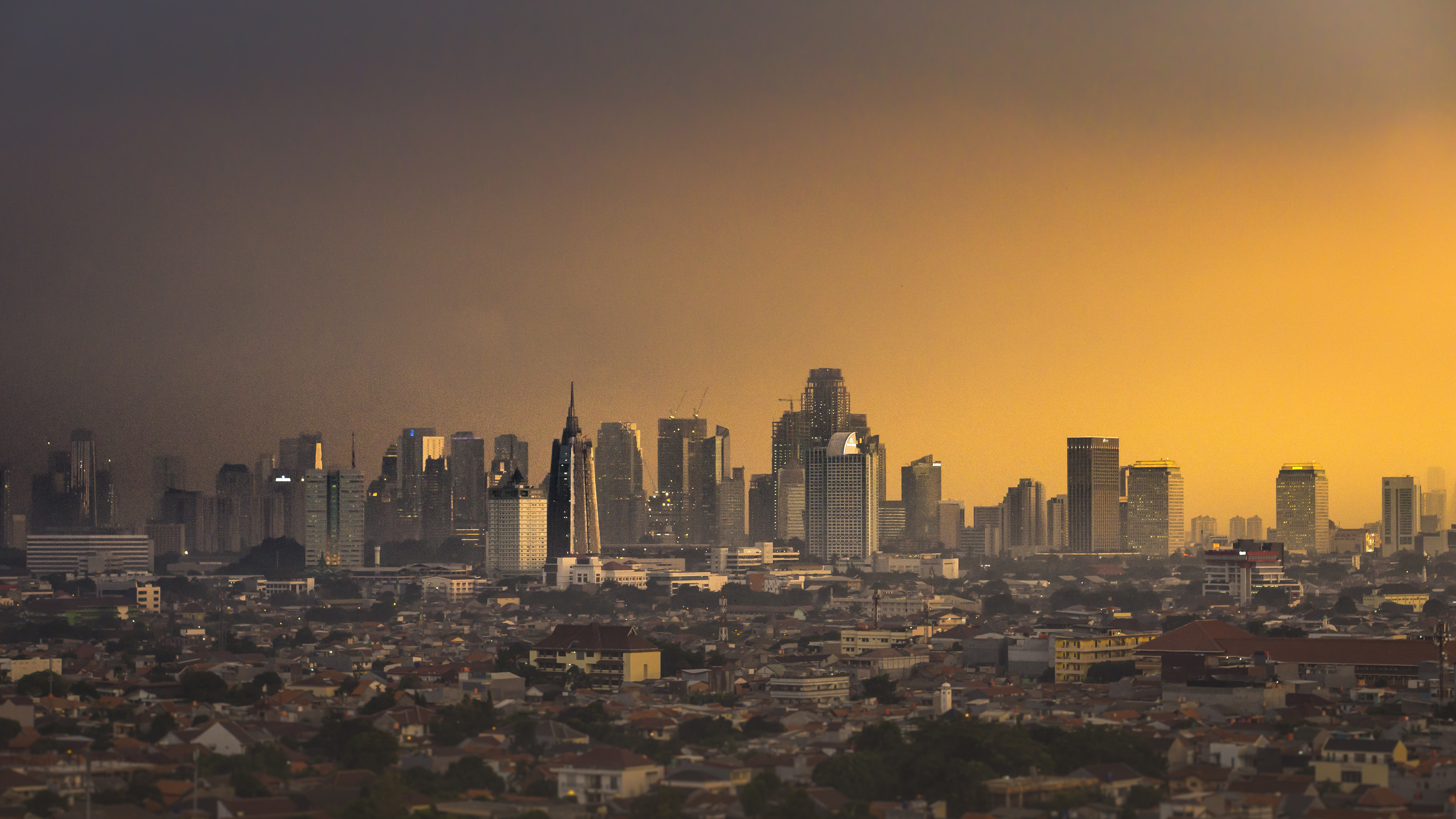
Jakarta is Indonesia's principal financial centre.

Indonesia has a mixed economy in which both the private sector and the government play major roles. In 2025, gross domestic product (GDP) was Rp23.821 quadrillion (US$1.45 trillion) at current prices, making it Southeast Asia's largest economy and placing it among the world's top 20 by nominal GDP and top 10 by GDP at purchasing power parity. Services and industry make up the largest shares of GDP, while agriculture is the largest single sector by employment. The country's currency is the rupiah.

The economy was once largely agricultural, and early post-independence policy focused on agricultural self-sufficiency. Industrialisation and urbanisation sped up from the late 1960s, with falling oil prices in the 1980s prompting a shift towards manufactured exports. From the mid-1980s to the mid-1990s, trade barriers fell and export-oriented manufacturing expanded as economic growth continued and poverty declined. The Asian financial crisis of 1997–98 caused a severe contraction and exposed weaknesses in the banking system. Reforms strengthened banking oversight and government finances, while allowing the rupiah's exchange rate to fluctuate more freely. These changes helped the economy withstand later financial shocks, including the global financial crisis in 2008. Following the COVID-19 pandemic, exports and public and private consumption helped restore economic growth.

Micro, small and medium-sized enterprises generate more than 60% of national GDP and employ more than 95% of the total workforce. Private consumption is also a major driver of growth. Informal employment is widespread, including in agriculture, retail, and transport services. Informal firms tend to have lower productivity and pay, and workers outside larger firms have more limited access to social insurance. Businesses also face corruption, burdensome and sometimes conflicting local regulations, and infrastructure issues such as power outages and road congestion. Women's labour force participation has remained lower than men's since the 1990s. (Note: Social expectations concerning household responsibilities and men's roles as breadwinners, together with limited childcare provision, have constrained women's employment opportunities.)

The official poverty rate was about 8% in March 2026. Expenditure inequality, measured by the Gini coefficient, stood at 0.368 in the same month and was higher in urban than in rural areas. The social protection system primarily supports low-income households. Mechanisms include food assistance and cash transfers based on several requirements, such as access to certain health or education services.

=== Economic geography and sectors ===
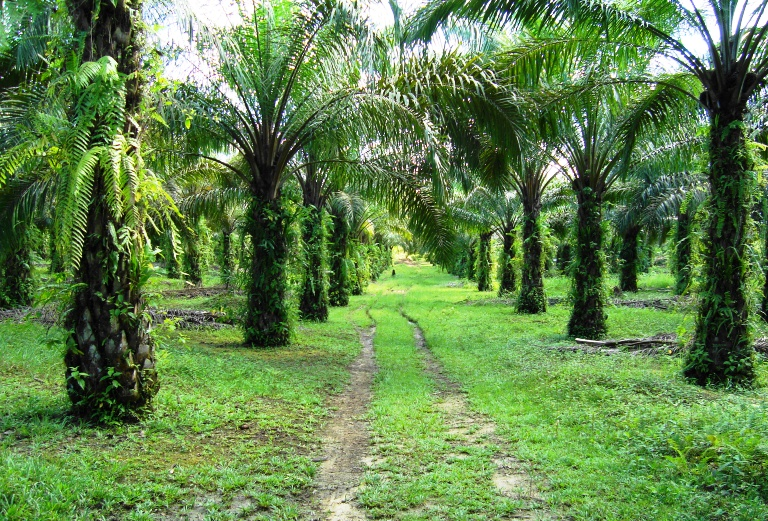
Palm oil plantation in Kampar Regency, Riau.

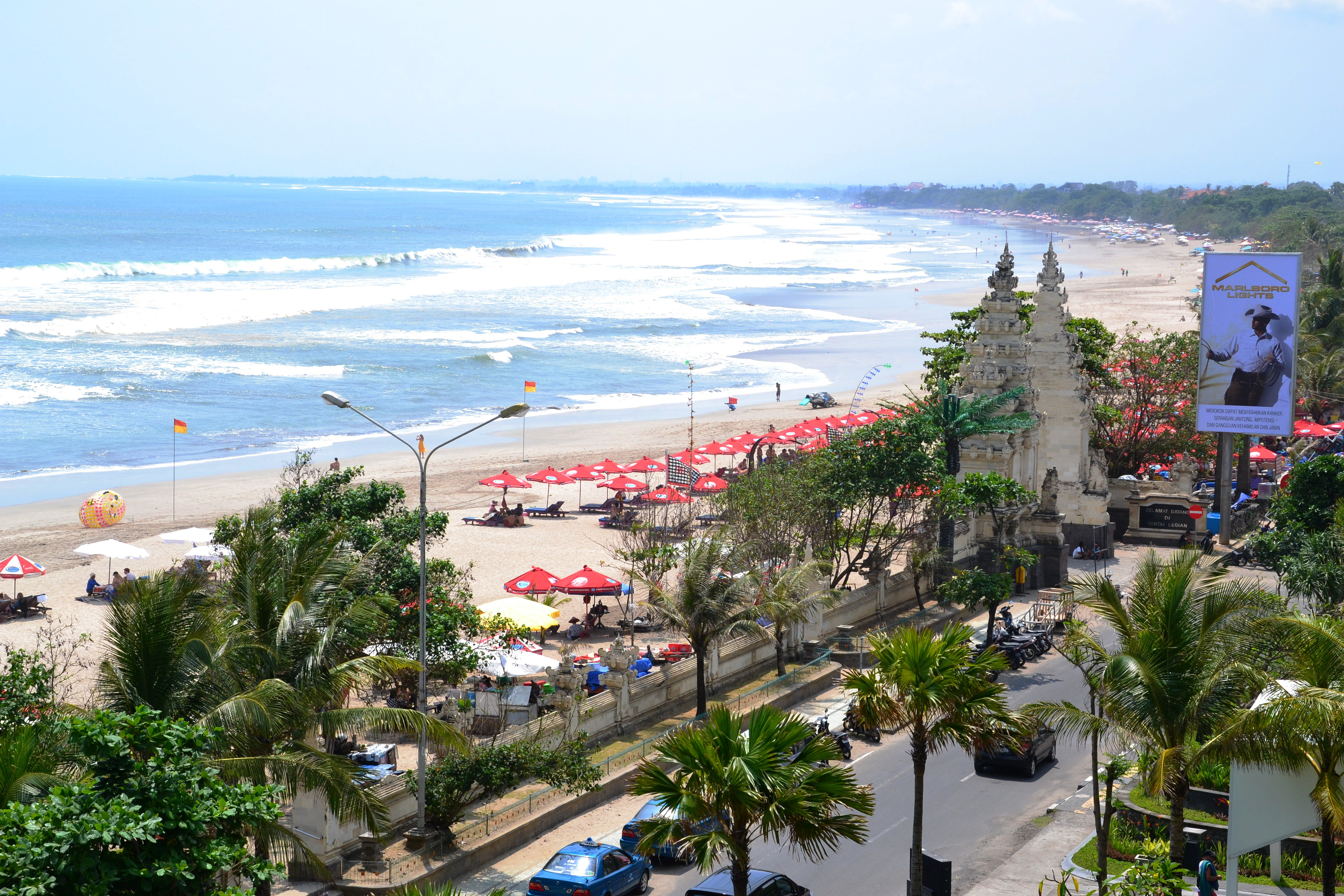
Kuta Beach in Bali. The island is Indonesia's leading tourist destination.

The country's many islands affect where economic activity takes place and how goods move across the country. Economic activity is concentrated on Java, with Jakarta in particular contributing a disproportionate share of national output. Meanwhile, much of eastern Indonesia has weaker infrastructure and economies more dependent on agriculture. High domestic transport and logistics costs constrain economic activity outside Java and make it harder to connect producers in the eastern regions with major markets.

Agricultural production includes rice and palm oil, two commodities for which the country ranks among the world's largest producers. Rice is the country's main staple food, while palm oil production continues to expand due to rising global demand. Palm oil made up much of Indonesia's agricultural and food exports in 2024. Fishing and aquaculture support millions of jobs, particularly in coastal communities. Indonesia is among the largest producers in marine capture fisheries, with about 9% of global output in 2024.

Major industries in manufacturing include food and beverage processing, chemicals, textiles and clothing, motor vehicles and electronics. Food and beverage processing is the largest industry, contributing 35.1% of manufacturing value added. Exports of manufactured goods include jewellery, electrical equipment, machinery and chemical products. Indonesia participates less in cross-border production and uses fewer imported inputs in its exports, compared with other ASEAN economies.

Tourism is a major service industry, with domestic visitor spending reaching about US$170 billion in 2023. The industry employs millions in businesses such as accommodation, food services, transport, and tourism goods retail. The country's digital economy is the largest in Southeast Asia, with about US$90 billion in transactions in 2024, primarily from e-commerce. Digital services have widened opportunities for small businesses.

Natural resource industries affect both investment and economic growth, which can rise or fall with commodity prices. Policies since 2020 have promoted domestic nickel refining by restricting exports of unprocessed ore. Major exports include palm oil, coal, ferronickel and liquefied natural gas. Most export destinations are in Asia, but the United States and the European Union are also major markets. Indonesia participates in regional economic cooperation through ASEAN and APEC and maintains trade and investment ties with the wider global economy, but its exports and imports make up a smaller share of GDP than in most other ASEAN economies.

=== Infrastructure ===
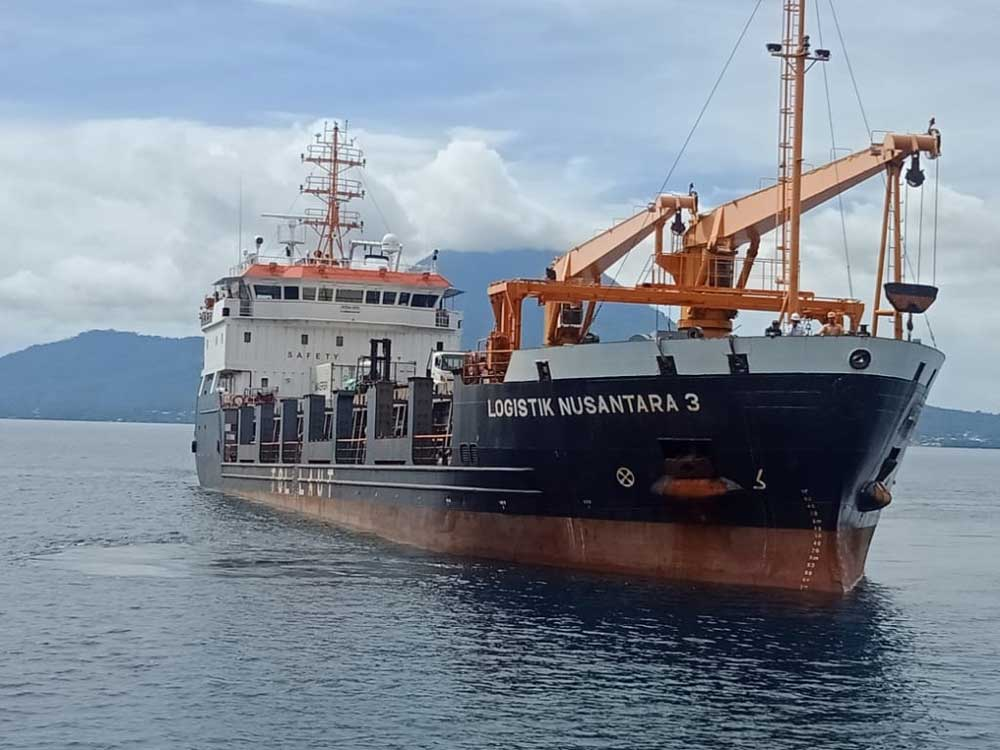
Cargo ships transport essential goods between Indonesia's islands.

Infrastructure connects Indonesia's dispersed islands and supports trade, access to services and economic activity. The archipelagic geography has made infrastructure development costly and complicated, particularly in transport and logistics. The Palapa Ring network of land and undersea fibre-optic cables has expanded internet access, though some remote areas remain underserved.

Shipping and domestic air services connect islands, including remote and outermost regions. Road transport dominates passenger and freight movement, and reliance on personal vehicles regularly causes traffic congestion in cities where public transport is limited. Rail transport is concentrated on Java, but the Makassar–Parepare railway has brought rail services to Sulawesi. The Jakarta–Bandung high-speed railway, operating since 2023, is the first high-speed railway in Southeast Asia.

Indonesia produced nearly twice as much primary energy as it consumed in 2023, with coal dominating both primary energy production and electricity generation. The state-owned electricity company controls transmission and distribution networks and purchases electricity from independent power producers for supply to the national grids. Electricity reaches nearly all households, but some remote communities face unreliable service or lack grid connections. Indonesia ranked first globally in geothermal generation, although renewables supplied only a small share of electricity in 2023.

== Demographics ==
A map of districts (kecamatan) coloured by population density, measured in people per square kilometre

The 2020 census recorded 270.2 million people, making it the world's fourth most populous country after India, China and the United States. The population is concentrated on Java and in urban centres, whereas many provinces outside Java and Bali are much less densely populated. (Note: The Dutch colonial administration and successive Indonesian governments resettled millions of people from Java to other islands through a programme known as transmigration. By the late 1990s, however, it had made little difference to Java's population density. The programme was criticised for its costs and the displacement of local communities.) Java is home to 55.6% of the population, and its population density is far above the national average, (Note: 141 people per square kilometre (370 people/mi^{2}), per the 2020 national census) reaching 1,171 people per square kilometre (3,030 people/mi^{2}).

Median age was 30.7 years in 2026, while about 69% of the population was aged 15–64 in 2025. A 2025 population survey recorded a total fertility rate of 2.13 births per woman, which is close to the level needed to replace each generation. Meanwhile, almost 12% of the population was aged 60 or older.

Approximately 59% of Indonesians lived in urban areas as of 2025. About 69% of urban households in the same year had access to adequate housing, based on national standards for living space, construction durability, drinking water and sanitation. Under the United Nations' urban-area definition, Jakarta was the world's most populous city in 2025, with nearly 42 million inhabitants. (Note: Jakarta's civil registry recorded about 11 million registered residents in the province in 2025. The UN figure includes densely populated neighbouring communities beyond its administrative boundaries.) Urbanisation has resulted from migration from rural areas, births exceeding deaths in cities, and the reclassification of rural settlements as urban. It has also expanded metropolitan regions, especially on Java, and increased demand for infrastructure, basic services, and city management.

About 8 million Indonesians reside abroad according to a 2017 estimate, with large communities in Malaysia, the Netherlands, Saudi Arabia, Singapore, and Taiwan. Many of them work in domestic service and other low-skilled jobs.

=== Ethnic groups and languages ===
A map of ethnic groups in Indonesia

The 2010 census listed over 1,300 ethnic and sub-ethnic categories. A later study in 2015 reclassified them into about 600 groups after noting classification difficulties. Austronesian-speaking populations predominate in much of western and central Indonesia. Melanesian populations live mainly in the eastern islands, including parts of Nusa Tenggara, Maluku, and Papua. The Javanese are the largest ethnic group, making up about 40% of the population. Other major groups include the Sundanese, Malay, Batak, Madurese, Betawi, Minangkabau, and Bugis. (Note: Indonesia is also home to smaller communities of Chinese, Indian, and Arab descent, each with a long-standing presence in the archipelago.)

The country's official language, Indonesian, is a standardised form of Malay. Malay had long served as the archipelago's lingua franca before the 1928 Youth Pledge declared Indonesian the language of national unity. It became the official language upon Indonesian independence in 1945. Written in the Latin script, Indonesian has spread through education, government, and mass media, and serves as a common language across ethnic and regional boundaries.

More than 700 languages are spoken across the archipelago. These fall broadly into the Austronesian family and several unrelated language families collectively called Papuan. Javanese is the most widely spoken local language and has official regional status in Yogyakarta. Several regional languages have their own traditional writing systems, some of which are now used only to a limited extent. Local languages remain part of regional identity and cultural heritage, even as Indonesian dominates national public life. Dutch never became widely spoken in Indonesia, but some Dutch-language civil and commercial codes have continued to apply.

=== Religion ===
Baiturrahman Grand Mosque in Aceh as seen in 1893. Northern Sumatra saw one of the earliest Islamic sultanates in the Indonesian archipelago.

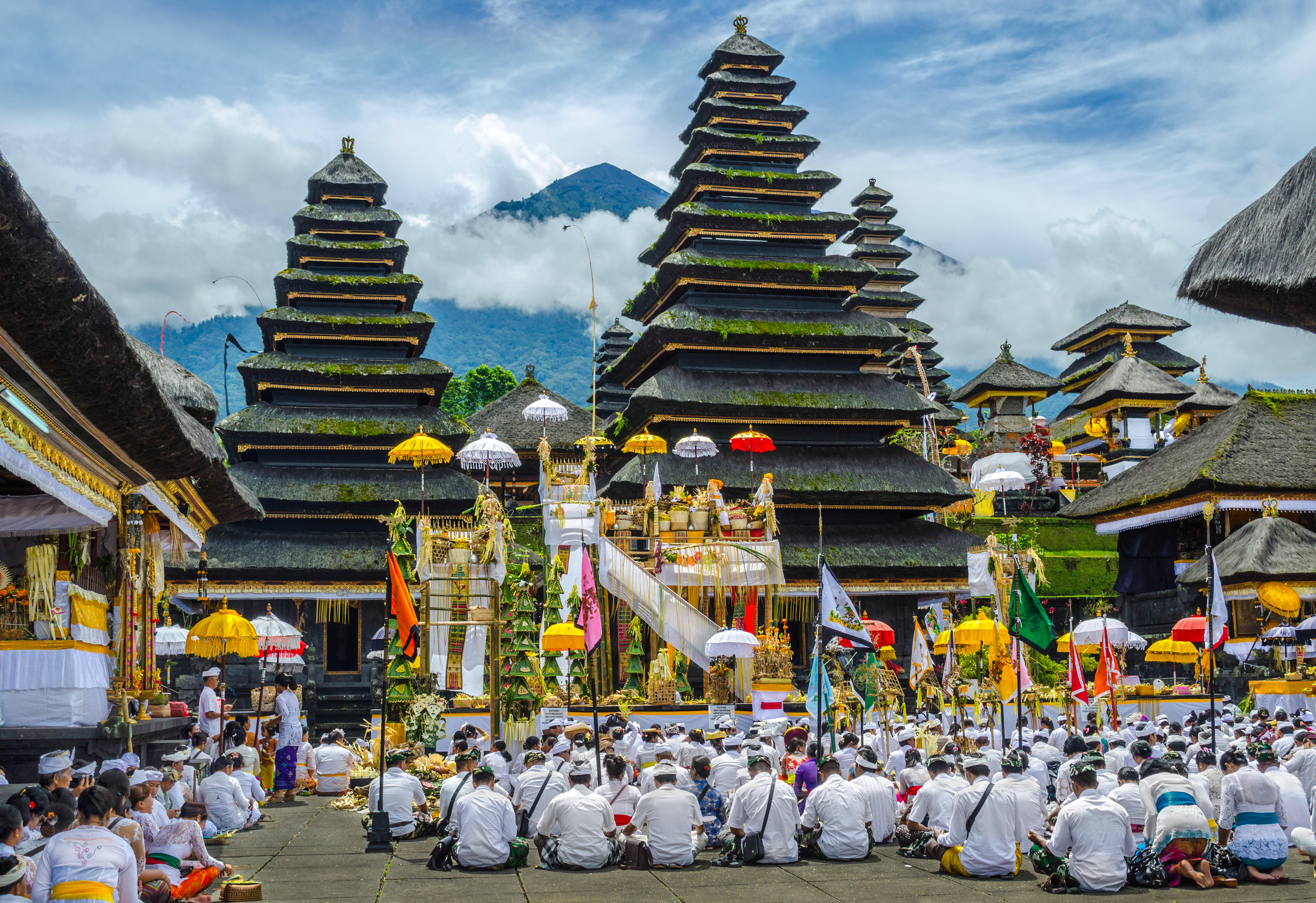
A Hindu prayer ceremony at Besakih Temple in Bali, Indonesia's only Hindu-majority province.

Indonesia recognises six religions: Islam, Protestantism, Roman Catholicism, Hinduism, Buddhism, and Confucianism, while the constitution guarantees freedom of religion. The state regulates religious affiliation, marriages, and places of worship. Indigenous beliefs have gained separate legal recognition, but their followers still face discrimination. Pancasila makes belief in one God one of the state ideology's five principles and is used to support national unity and religious harmony. Religious minorities still face discrimination, including through local religious bylaws, social pressure, and restrictions on worship.

Indonesia has the largest Muslim population in the world, with 251 million Muslims in 2025, or 87.15% of the population. (Note: Minorities include Shias and Ahmadis.) Most Indonesian Muslims are Sunni, with the Shafi'i school of Islamic law historically dominant. The two largest Muslim organisations in the country, Nahdlatul Ulama (NU) and Muhammadiyah, represent two major strands of Islam in Indonesia. NU is rooted in traditionalist Islam, which emphasises preserving established Islamic scholarly traditions and religious practices, while Muhammadiyah is associated with reformist teachings, which emphasise interpreting Islamic scriptures directly. Both also act as social institutions and are active in civic affairs. They have also taken part in debates over religious teaching, public policy and the place of Islam in Indonesian society.

Christians are the country's second-largest religious group, numbering 30.1 million people, or 10.44% of the population. Some provinces in eastern Indonesia are Christian-majority, including the East Nusa Tenggara province and much of Papua. Hindus (1.66%, or 4.7 million people) are concentrated in Bali, while Buddhists (0.69%, or 1.9 million people) are found mainly among Chinese Indonesians, though not exclusively.

Many local belief systems predate major world religions and continue alongside them. They include beliefs in ancestors, spirits, and powers associated with nature. Examples include Sunda Wiwitan in West Java, Javanese Kejawèn, and Dayak Kaharingan, practised within or alongside recognised religions. In Bali, Hinduism developed through interaction with local religious traditions and practices. Local customs have shaped Islamic practices across Indonesia, sometimes causing disagreements over religious orthodoxy between traditionalists and reformists.

=== Education ===
Schoolchildren attend an outdoor lesson in Papua

Indonesia's education system includes more than 50 million students, over 3 million teachers and over 400,000 educational institutions. It is administered by ministries responsible for school education, higher education and religious education, (Note: The Ministry of Primary and Secondary Education, the Ministry of Higher Education, Science, and Technology and the Ministry of Religious Affairs for Islamic schools.) and generally follows a 6-3-3-4 structure: six years of primary school, three each of junior and senior secondary school, and typically four for an undergraduate degree.

Since independence, schools have supported national integration through Indonesian-language instruction, national curricula, and civic education. Access to education and school quality vary, particularly between urban and rural areas and among regions with differing levels of development. Teacher quality and distribution are also persistent issues. Student learning outcomes are low by OECD benchmarks. In PISA 2022, Indonesian 15-year-olds performed below OECD averages in mathematics, reading and science, with most not reaching the minimum proficiency level in each subject.

Government expenditure on education was approximately 2.4% of GDP in 2024. In 2022, Indonesia had 4,481 higher education institutions, including universities, Islamic colleges, institutions preparing students for government service, and an open university. The University of Indonesia, Gadjah Mada University, and the Bandung Institute of Technology are among the highest-ranked public universities in international rankings. Higher education has expanded since 1990 and helps develop workforce skills, but access, participation, and institutional quality are uneven.

=== Healthcare ===
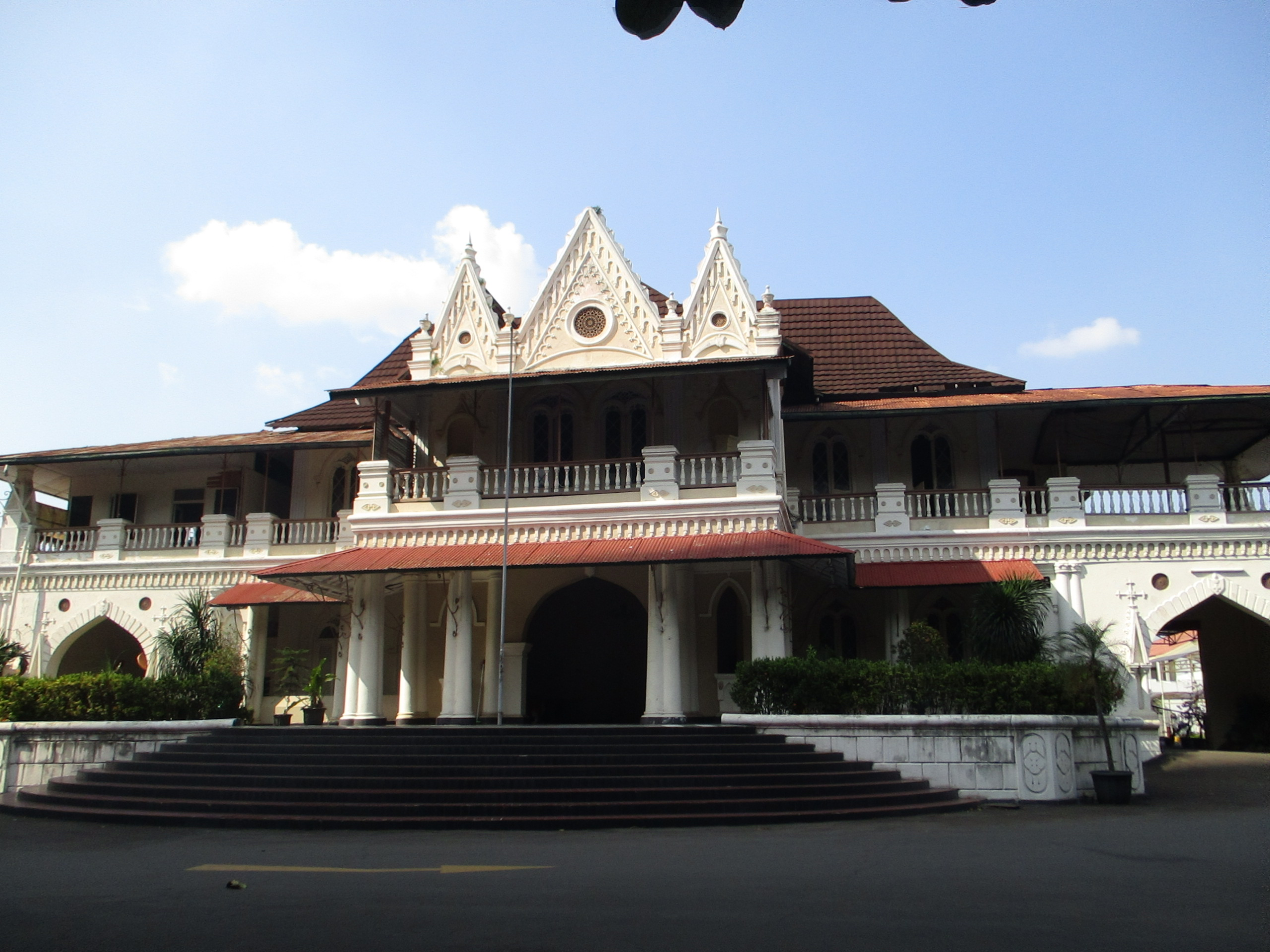
The main building of Cikini Hospital in Central Jakarta. Established in the 1890s, it is one of the oldest, continuously operating hospitals in Indonesia.

Primary care is provided through community health centres (puskesmas), private clinics and general practitioners. In 2014, Indonesia launched National Health Insurance (Jaminan Kesehatan Nasional), one of the world's largest single-payer health-insurance systems, covering 98% of the population by 2024. Despite near-universal coverage, access to care and healthcare personnel still varies by location. Government expenditure on healthcare was approximately 1.4% of GDP in 2024.

Life expectancy increased between 1990 and 2019 from 62.5 to 69.4 years for men and from 65.7 to 73.5 years for women, but there are substantial differences between provinces. Non-communicable diseases, including heart disease and diabetes, account for a growing share of health loss, while infectious diseases such as tuberculosis continue to cause illness and premature death. Stunting prevalence among children under five was 22% in 2024.

== Culture ==
Cultures in Indonesia differ across islands, languages, and communities. Earlier populations and later Austronesian migrations contributed to this diversity, with Melanesian communities prominent in parts of eastern Indonesia. Movement by sea placed the archipelago within trading and migration networks involving Indian, Arab, Persian, Chinese, and mainland Southeast Asian peoples, followed later by Europeans. Religious and courtly influences entered through these routes, and European expansion ultimately brought colonial domination. Coastal commercial centres often encountered outside influences before they reached inland communities.

Indonesia has no single, uniform cultural tradition. Regional traditions draw on local languages and cultures, while forms intended for audiences across Indonesia generally use the Indonesian language. These traditions include performance, visual art, ritual, clothing, food, and literature. Modern popular culture includes cinema, television drama, music, celebrity media and reality shows, along with imported Asian dramas and global formats adapted for Indonesian audiences.

Indonesia has 16 items on the UNESCO intangible heritage lists, including wayang puppet theatre, batik, angklung, the saman dance, and pencak silat. Other entries include pantun, kebaya, and kolintang, which were inscribed through multinational nominations.

=== National identity and observances ===
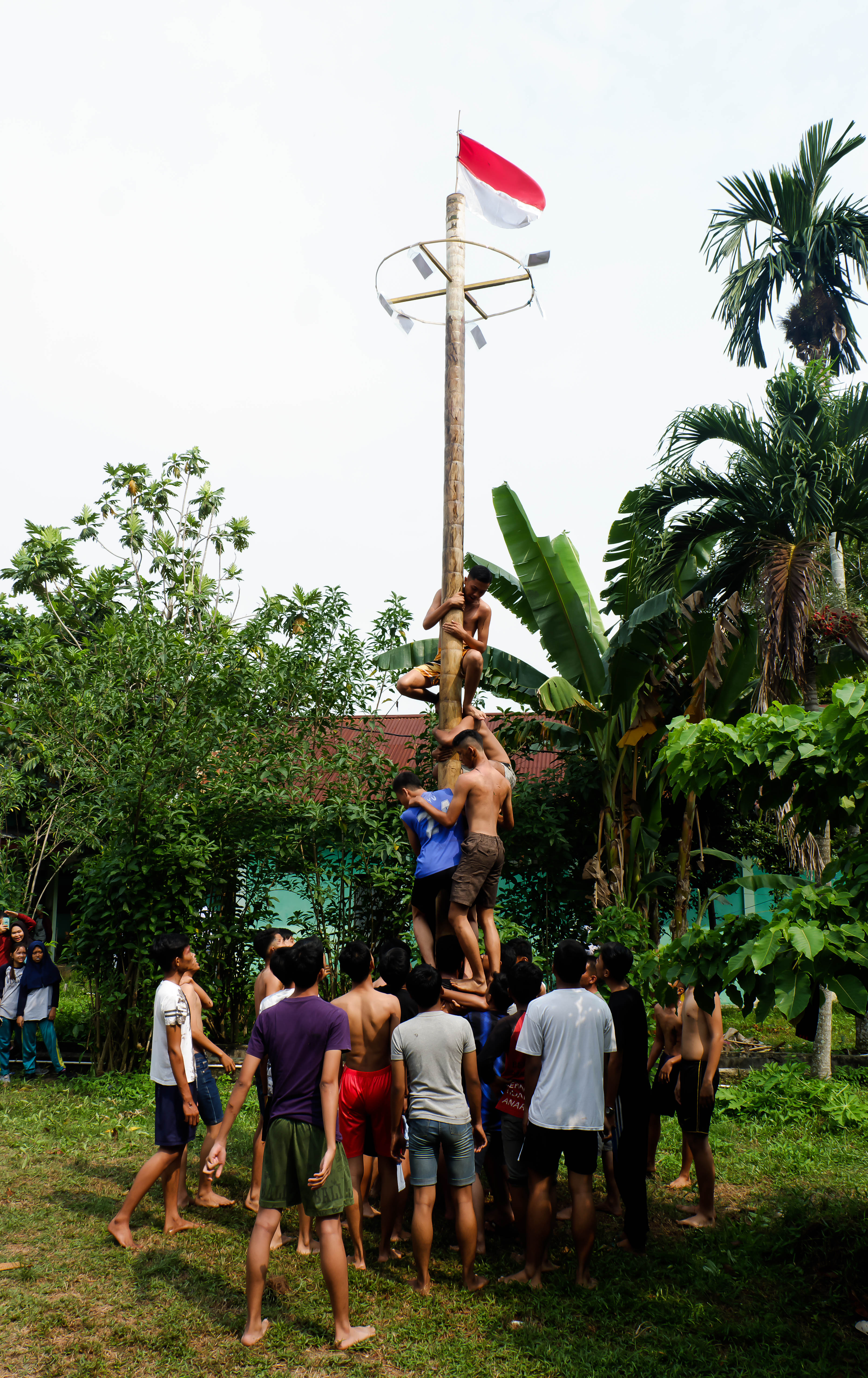
Panjat Pinang, a common type of competition held during Independence Day celebrations.

Indonesia's national symbols include the red-and-white flag, the Garuda Pancasila emblem and the national anthem, Indonesia Raya. The scroll on the Garuda emblem carries an Old Javanese motto, Bhinneka Tunggal Ika, usually translated as "Unity in Diversity". The phrase comes from Sutasoma, a 14th-century Majapahit poem by Mpu Tantular expressing the unity of Hindu and Buddhist traditions. In its modern national usage, it expresses the ideal of unity among Indonesia's different ethnic, linguistic and religious communities.

Pancasila is the country's foundational philosophy. It comprises five principles: belief in one God, just and civilised humanity, national unity, democracy through deliberation and representation, and social justice. They appear in the preamble to the 1945 Constitution and have formed part of official efforts to define Indonesian national identity. Other prominent social concepts include gotong royong (mutual assistance) and musyawarah (deliberation and consensus). Adat encompasses customary norms and traditions that vary among communities.

National holidays include Independence Day on 17 August and religious observances such as Eid al-Fitr, Christmas, Nyepi, Vesak and Chinese New Year. Independence Day is commemorated through flag-raising ceremonies, community celebrations, and traditional competitions. Eid al-Fitr, known locally as Lebaran, follows Ramadan and is associated with mudik (homecoming travel), family visits and requests for forgiveness. In Bali, Nyepi marks the Hindu Saka New Year with silence and restrictions on work and travel.

=== Visual arts and architecture ===
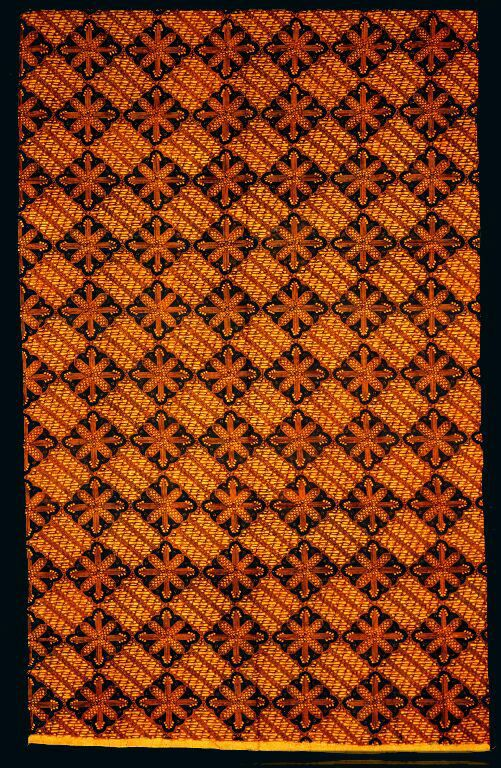
An Indonesian batik

Indonesian arts include textiles, puppetry, masks, carving, and painting. Textiles are used in rituals and can convey social standing and ethnic affiliation. Colonial rule and nationalism affected the development of modern painting, and tourism and urban art communities became increasingly important later in the 20th century. Regional painting traditions include Bali's classical Kamasan style, whose narrative scenes share figures with wayang puppet theatre. Sculptural traditions include megalithic monuments, Ngaju Dayak hampatong figures used for commemoration or protection, and Asmat carvings with spiritual and aesthetic roles.

Indonesian architecture ranges from ordinary dwellings to traditional houses (rumah adat), whose designs and rituals express ancestry, status and local beliefs. Regional forms include the Javanese pendapa pavilions, Dayak longhouses, Minangkabau Rumah Gadang, and Toraja Tongkonan clan houses. Monumental religious architecture includes Borobudur and Prambanan, while surviving Hindu and Buddhist sculpture from the 8th to 15th centuries includes works in stone, bronze, and gold.

Clothing traditions differ by region and are used in ceremonies, weddings, formal occasions, and as markers of local identity. Batik and kebaya are widely used in national and formal dress and are especially prominent in Javanese culture. Other regional textile traditions include Minangkabau gold-thread textiles and ikat (yarn dyed in patterns before weaving) among Batak and many eastern Indonesian communities. These textiles are used at formal events, in bridal exchanges and during ceremonies and weddings.

=== Performing arts ===
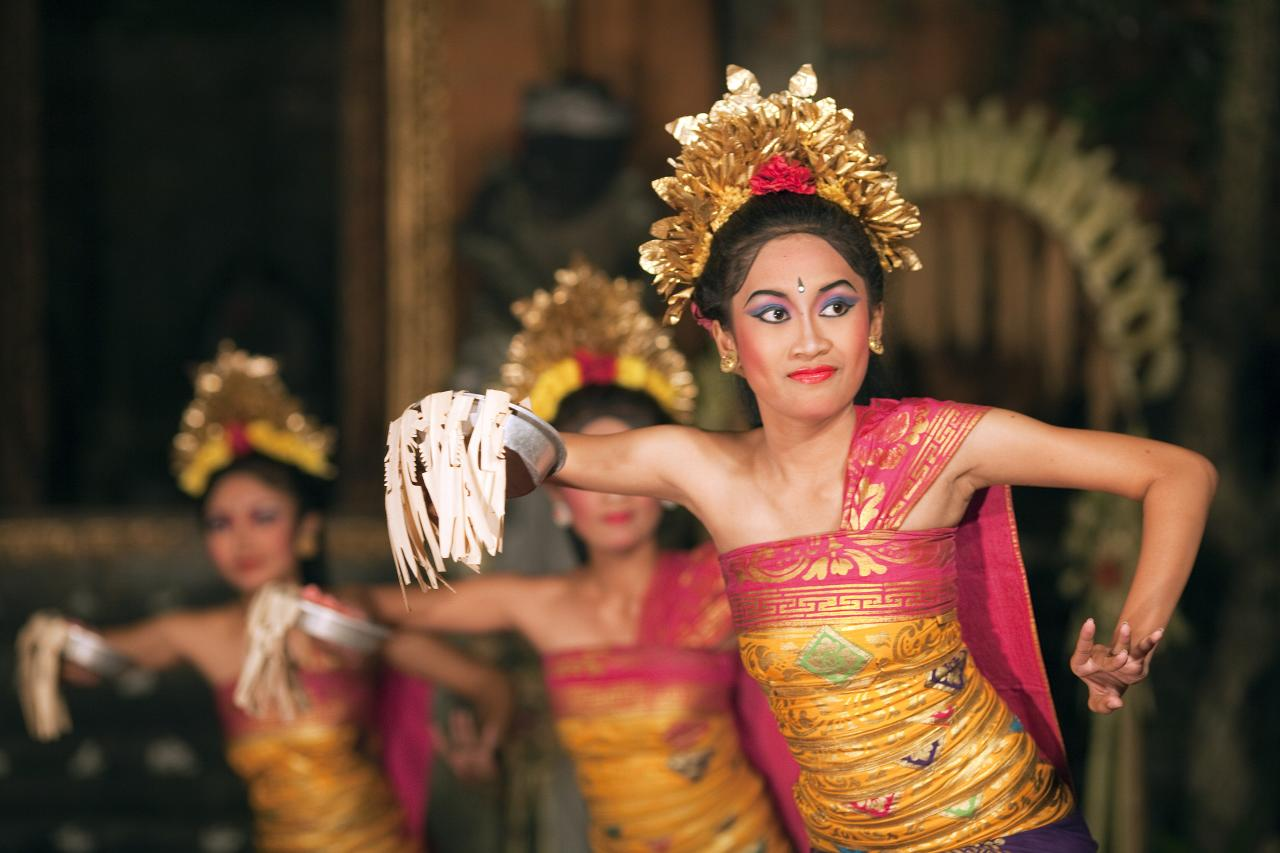
Dancers performing Pendet, a traditional Balinese dance.

Indonesian music and dance include court, village, ritual, and popular forms. Gamelan orchestras are especially prominent in Java and Bali, while angklung, made from shaken bamboo tubes, and other bamboo ensembles are found in western Java and Banyumas. Drums, gongs, lutes and singing often accompany dance. Islamic-influenced music includes lute-based gambus and devotional qasida songs. Popular genres include string-based keroncong and dangdut, which draws on Malay, Indian, Arabic and Western pop and rock influences.

Mask dances appear in Javanese court drama and Balinese ritual performance, while Dayak mask dances are performed in agricultural rituals and communal ceremonial settings. Javanese court dance includes forms such as bedhaya and serimpi, while other local dances are associated with theatre and music, spirit possession, harvests, temple festivals, cremation ceremonies, and commemorations of the dead. Contemporary dance groups also adapt K-pop choreography and hip-hop.

Traditional Indonesian theatre encompasses storytelling, music, movement, puppetry, masks, acting, and dance. Wayang is a prominent puppet-theatre tradition in Java that is also practised in Bali. A dalang (puppeteer) leads performances accompanied by gamelan, often drawing stories from the Indian epics Ramayana and Mahabharata. It has served ritual, moral, comic, political, and public-messaging functions. Other regional traditions combine drama with music, dance, masks, or martial arts, and modern theatre groups have used their performances for social and political commentary.

=== Literature ===
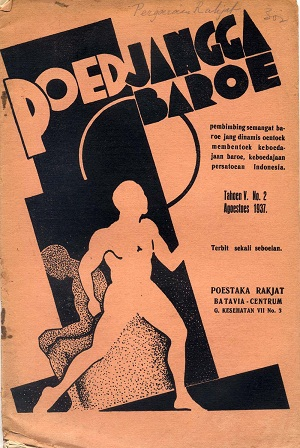
Cover of the 1937 issue of Poedjangga Baroe, an influential Indonesian literary magazine.

Literary traditions developed in many regional languages and included both oral and written forms. Oral traditions ranged from storytelling to songs, customs, beliefs, and other community forms, and material could move between oral and written forms. Traditional written literature includes court chronicles, religious and legal writing, narrative prose, and verse. These forms often served ethical, religious, or dynastic purposes rather than entertainment.

Modern literature grew in the early 20th century alongside the expansion of literacy, publishing, and a wider reading public. Balai Pustaka, originating from a Dutch colonial commission established in 1908 and named in 1917, distributed books through libraries and agencies across the archipelago, giving writers a wider readership. During this period, prose fiction and poetry became more prominent, displacing some older literary forms. From 1933 until the Japanese occupation in 1942, the literary magazine Poedjangga Baroe published essays, poetry, short stories, and a novel. Newspapers, magazines, and other publications carried Indonesian-language prose and poetry during the prewar period.

In the 1970s and 1980s, newspapers and magazines were important outlets, with regular sections carrying poetry, short stories, criticism, and serial fiction. From the late 1990s, some forms of literary activity began to emerge in digital media, as websites, mailing lists, forums and blogs provided spaces for literary communities and publication. After Suharto's government fell in 1998, writers faced fewer state restrictions and explored politics and sexuality more openly, alongside works addressing Islamic themes.

=== Cinema and mass media ===
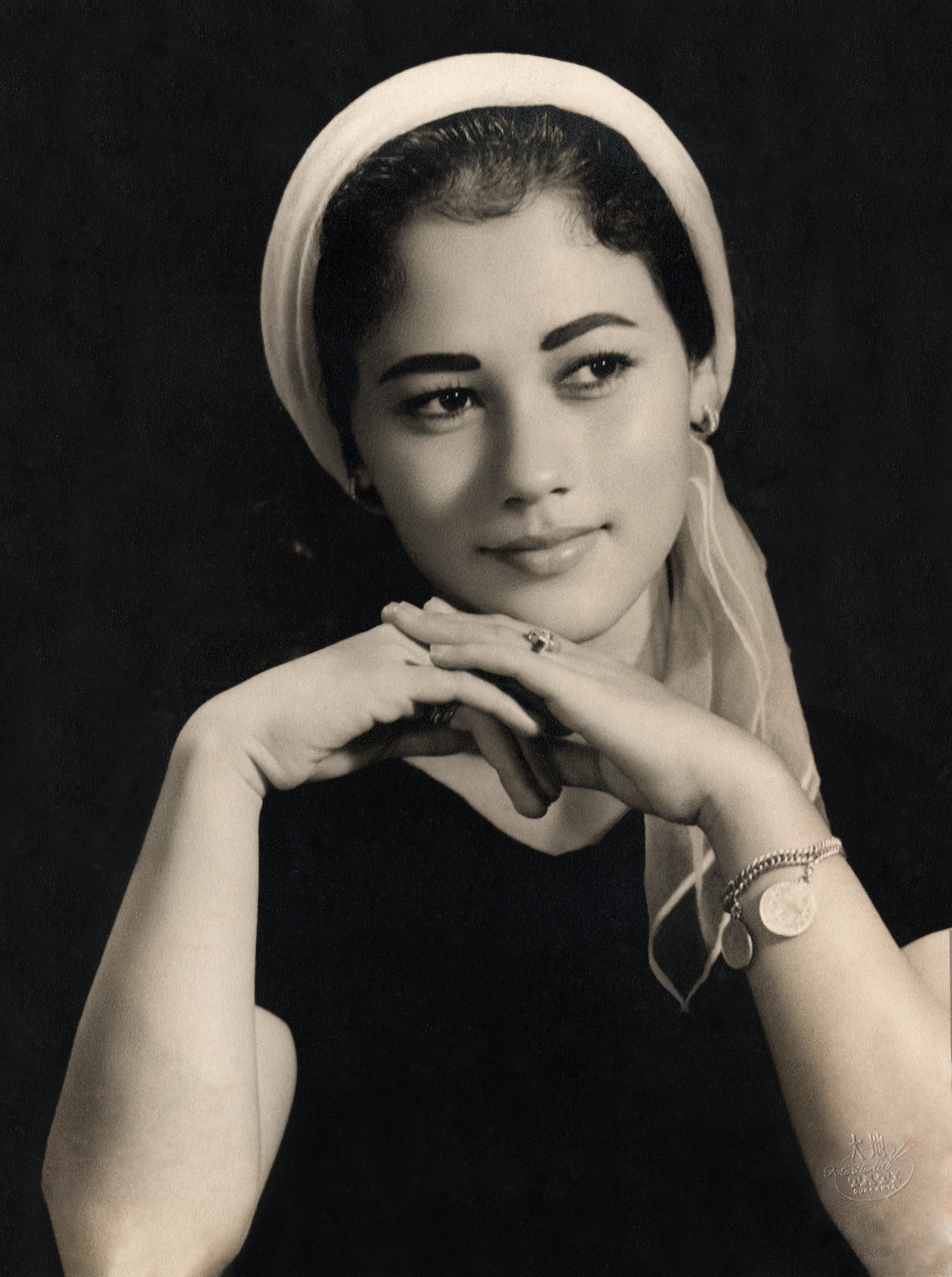
Suzzanna, an icon of Indonesian horror, a prominent genre in the country's cinema.

Feature film production began during the Dutch colonial era with Loetoeng Kasaroeng (1926), based on a Sundanese legend, and a small number of new film companies emerged after independence. Films became vehicles for nationalist and anti-imperialist politics under President Sukarno, while Suharto's New Order government later regulated and censored cinema. The domestic film industry declined sharply in the early 1990s. After the fall of Suharto in 1998, independent filmmakers, film communities, festivals, and renewed commercial production helped revive Indonesian cinema. Nevertheless, state censorship and pressure from some Islamic groups continued to restrict filmmakers' choices.

During the New Order, newspapers and broadcasters operated under licensing and censorship, and television was used to advance state-led development and a unified vision of national identity. During the reforms after 1998, the Press Law of 1999 prohibited censorship and publication bans and removed publishing-licence requirements, but journalists and news organisations continued to face lawsuits, intimidation and physical attacks, sometimes involving government officials.

Internet use grew rapidly from the mid-1990s, and websites provided another means of distributing news and information. Mainstream news organisations increasingly use the same reporting across television, print and online outlets, either through integrated newsrooms or by sharing content between them. News is also shortened or reformatted for websites and social media.

=== Cuisine ===
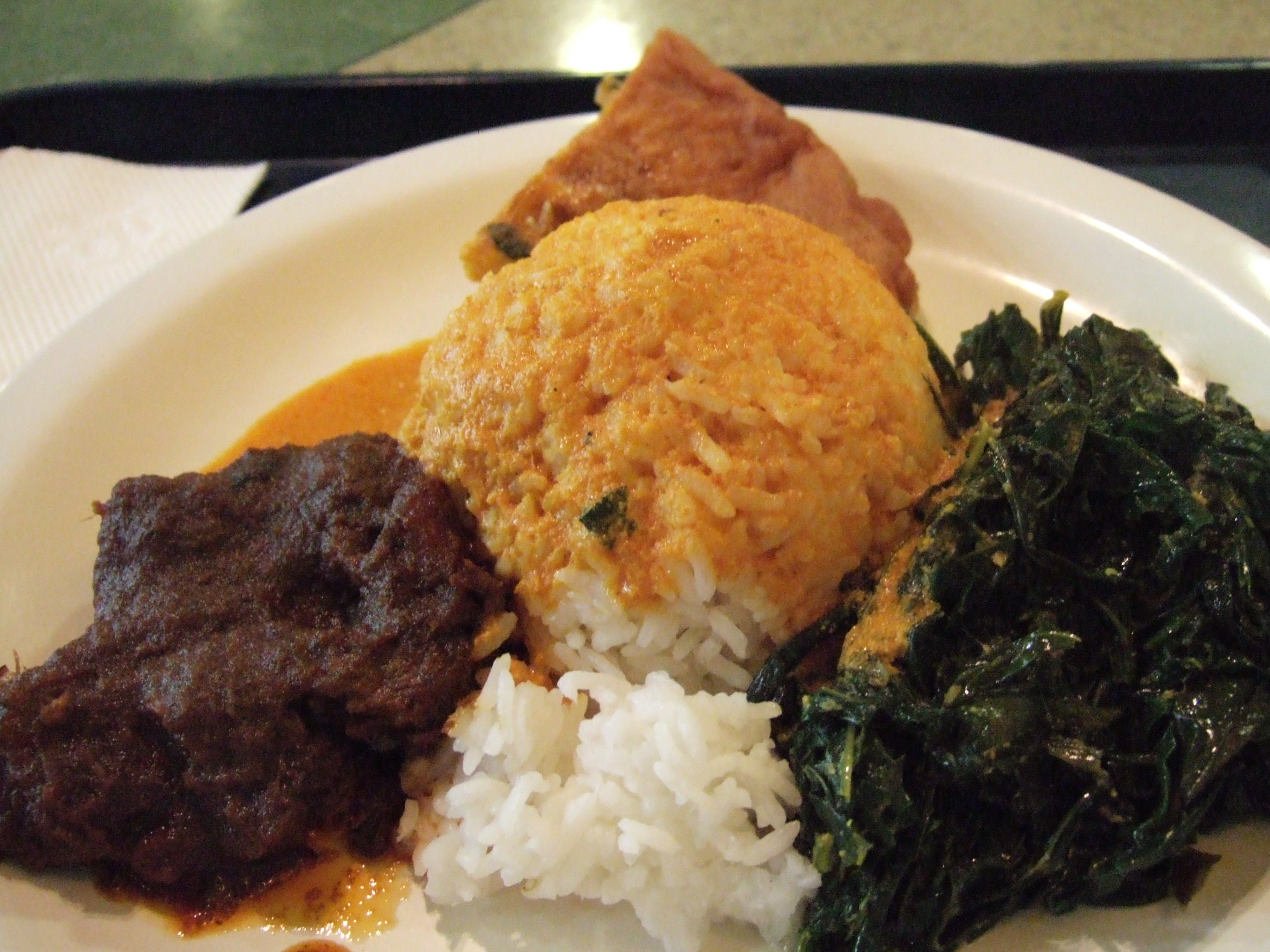
Nasi padang with rendang, gulai, and vegetables, an example of Minangkabau cuisine

Indonesian cuisine differs from one region to another in its ingredients, methods, and flavours. Trade and migration brought Indian, Chinese and Middle Eastern influences over centuries, and Portuguese and other European traders arriving from the 16th century, followed by Dutch colonial rule, introduced further ingredients and cooking practices. Indonesian cuisine also spread abroad, particularly to the Netherlands, where cookbooks and migration introduced Indonesian food to Dutch society by the late 19th century.

Rice is the staple food in much of the country and is commonly served with meat or fish, vegetables, sambal (a chilli-based condiment), and other accompaniments. Chilli, coconut milk, shrimp paste, peanuts, garlic, shallots, and tamarind are widely used in cooking, along with foods such as chicken and seafood. Peanut sauce commonly accompanies gado-gado, a vegetable salad, and sate, grilled skewered meat.

Tempeh, fermented soybeans originating in Java, and tofu (tahu) are widely consumed soybean products across Indonesia. Noodles (mie) and fried rice (nasi goreng) are also popular. West Sumatra's Minangkabau cuisine includes rendang, beef slowly cooked with spices and coconut milk. Tumpeng is a Javanese dish of cone-shaped rice and side dishes, served at life-cycle and communal ceremonies to express gratitude and seek blessings.

=== Sports ===
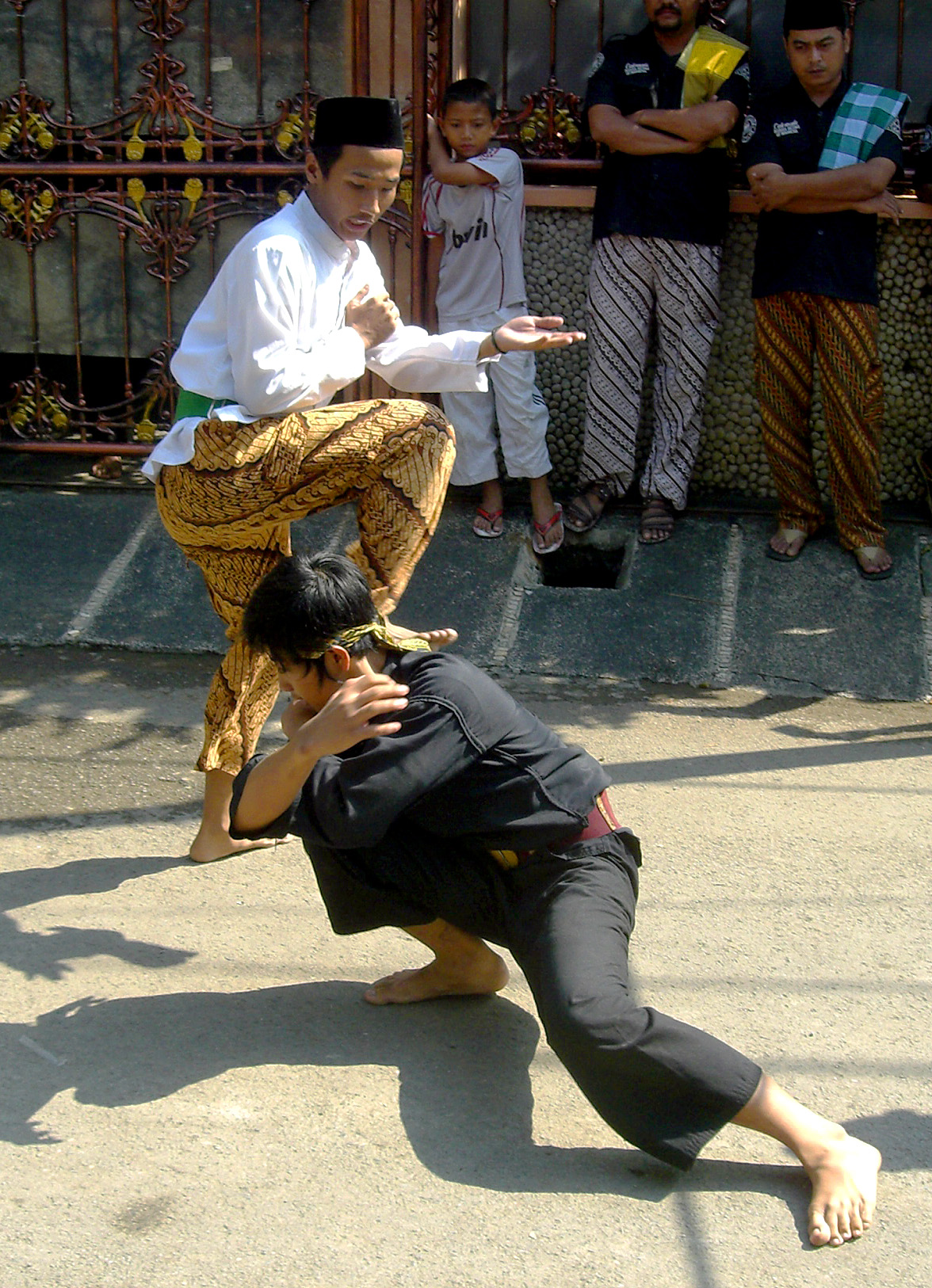
A demonstration of pencak silat, a form of martial arts

Popular sports in Indonesia include football, badminton, weightlifting, and basketball, along with local games and martial arts. Football is one of the most followed sports, with active club supporters and public screenings of matches. The team representing colonial Indonesia was the first Asian representative to appear at the FIFA World Cup, taking part in the 1938 tournament.

Indonesia has been particularly successful in international badminton, winning both the Thomas and Uber Cups, the men's and women's world team championships. Most of Indonesia's Olympic medals have come from badminton and weightlifting. Indonesia first competed at the Olympics in 1952 and has participated in the Asian Games since their inaugural edition in 1951. Jakarta has hosted the Asian Games twice, first in 1962 and again in 2018 with Palembang.

Traditional sports and games are featured in ceremonies, harvest events, contests, and public entertainment. Examples include sepak takraw, played by kicking a woven ball, bull racing (karapan sapi) in Madura, whip fighting (caci) in Flores, and horseback spear contests (pasola) in Sumba. Pencak silat is a form of Indonesian martial arts and was included as an official event at the 2018 Asian Games, where Indonesia won 14 gold medals in the sport.

== See also ==
- List of Indonesia-related topics
- Outline of Indonesia

== Notes and references ==
=== Sources ===
==== Books and book chapters ====
- Acri, A. (2011). "A New Perspective for 'Balinese Hinduism' in the Light of the Pre-modern Religious Discourse". In Picard, M.; Madinier, R. (eds.). The Politics of Religion in Indonesia: Syncretism, Orthodoxy, and Religious Contention in Java and Bali. Routledge. pp. 142–166. ISBN 978-1-138-84450-6.
- Ananta, A.; Arifin, Evi N.; Hasbullah, M. Sairi; Handayani, Nur B.; Pramono, A. (2015). Demography of Indonesia's Ethnicity. Institute of Southeast Asian Studies. ISBN 978-981-4519-87-8.
- Basri, M.C. (2018). "Twenty Years After the Asian Financial Crisis". In Breuer, Luis E.; Guajardo, J.; Kinda, T. (eds.). Realizing Indonesia's Economic Potential. International Monetary Fund. pp. 21–45. ISBN 978-1-4843-3714-1.
- Bellwood, P.; Fox, J.J.; Tryon, D. (2006). "The Austronesians in History: Common Origins and Diverse Transformations". In Bellwood, P.; Fox, J.J.; Tryon, D. (eds.). The Austronesians: Historical and Comparative Perspectives. Comparative Austronesian Series. ANU Press. pp. 1–16. ISBN 978-1-920942-85-4. JSTOR j.ctt2jbjx1.
- Berg, B. (2011). ""Authentic" Islamic Sound? Orkes Gambus Music, the Arab Idiom, and Sonic Symbols in Indonesian Islamic Music Arts". In Harnish, D.; Rasmussen, A. (eds.). Divine Inspirations: Music and Islam in Indonesia. Oxford University Press. pp. 207–240. doi:10.1093/acprof:oso/9780195385410.001.0001. ISBN 978-0-19-538541-0.
- Bevins, V. (2020). The Jakarta Method: Washington's Anticommunist Crusade and the Mass Murder Program That Shaped Our World. PublicAffairs. ISBN 978-1-5417-4240-6.
- Brown, C. (2004). A Short History of Indonesia: The Unlikely Nation?. A Short History of Asia. Allen & Unwin. ISBN 978-1-86508-838-9.
- Butcher, John G. (2009). "Becoming an Archipelagic State: The Juanda Declaration of 1957 and the 'Struggle' to Gain International Recognition of the Archipelagic Principle". In Cribb, R.; Ford, M. (eds.). Indonesia Beyond the Water's Edge: Managing an Archipelagic State. ISEAS Publishing. pp. 28–48. doi:10.1355/9789812309815-006.
- Butt, S.; Lindsey, T. (2018). "The Civil Code, Civil Liability, and Contract Law". Indonesian Law. Oxford Academic. pp. 307–321. ISBN 978-0-191-75724-2.
- Coutas, P. (2008). "Fame, Fortune, Fantasi: Indonesian Idol and the New Celebrity". In Heryanto, A. (ed.). Popular Culture in Indonesia: Fluid Identities in Post-Authoritarian Politics. Routledge. pp. 111–129. ISBN 978-0-415-46112-2.
- Cribb, R. (2000). Historical Atlas of Indonesia. University of Hawai'i Press. ISBN 9780824821111 – via Internet Archive.
- Damuri, Yose R.; Intan, R.; Rafitrandi, D. (2023). "Strategic interests, regional integration and international economic policy in Indonesia" (PDF). In Armstrong, S.; Westland, T.; Triggs, A. (eds.). Navigating Prosperity and Security in East Asia. ANU Press. pp. 119–142. Archived (PDF) from the original on 19 October 2024.
- Drake, C. (1989). "The Sociocultural Dimension". National Integration in Indonesia. University of Hawai'i Press. pp. 64–68, 73–74. doi:10.2307/j.ctv9zcjnv.9.
- Elson, R.E. (2008). The Idea of Indonesia: A History. Cambridge University Press. ISBN 978-0-521-12108-8.
- Feener, R. Michael (2010). "South-East Asian Localisations of Islam and Participation Within a Global Umma, c. 1500–1800". In Morgan, David O.; Reid, A. (eds.). The New Cambridge History of Islam. Vol. 3: The Eastern Islamic World, Eleventh to Eighteenth Centuries. Cambridge University Press. pp. 470–503. doi:10.1017/CHOL9780521850315.015. ISBN 978-1-139-05613-7.
- Fogg, Kevin W. (2019). "Islam in Indonesia before the Revolution". Indonesia's Islamic Revolution. Cambridge University Press. pp. 23–46. doi:10.1017/9781108768214.003.
- Forshee, J. (2006). Culture and Customs of Indonesia. Greenwood Press. ISBN 978-0-3133-3339-2 – via Internet Archive.
- Frederick, W.H.; Worden, R.L., eds. (2011). Indonesia: A Country Study (PDF). Area handbook series, 39. Library of Congress, Federal Research Division (6th ed.). U.S. Government Printing Office. ISBN 978-0-8444-0790-6. Archived (PDF) from the original on 9 December 2025.
- Friend, T. (2003). Indonesian Destinies. Belknap Press of Harvard University Press. ISBN 0-674-01137-6 – via Internet Archive.
- Hall, Kenneth R. (2011). A History of Early Southeast Asia: Maritime Trade and Societal Development, 100–1500. Rowman & Littlefield. ISBN 978-0-7425-6760-3.
- Hanan, D. (2017). "Intermittent Industries: Film Production in Indonesia over Nine Decades". Cultural Specificity in Indonesian Film: Diversity in Unity. Palgrave Macmillan. pp. 53–90. doi:10.1007/978-3-319-40874-3_3. ISBN 978-3-319-40874-3.
- van Heeren, K. (2012). Contemporary Indonesian Film: Spirits of Reform and Ghosts from the Past. Verhandelingen van het Koninklijk Instituut voor Taal-, Land- en Volkenkunde. Vol. 277. KITLV Press. ISBN 978-90-6718-381-9.
- Hellwig, T. (2014). "Indonesian Literatures and Literary Criticism". In Tagliacozzo, E. (ed.). Producing Indonesia: The State of the Field of Indonesian Studies. Southeast Asia Program Publications, Cornell University. pp. 217–232. ISBN 978-0-87727-325-7. JSTOR 10.7591/j.ctt20d87jt.20.
- Heryanto, A. (2008). "Pop Culture and Competing Identities". In Heryanto, A. (ed.). Popular Culture in Indonesia: Fluid Identities in Post-Authoritarian Politics. Routledge. pp. 1–36. ISBN 978-0-415-46112-2.
- Johns, Anthony H. (1979). Cultural Options and the Role of Tradition: A Collection of Essays on Modern Indonesian and Malaysian Literature. Australian National University Press.
- Kitley, P. (2000). Television, Nation, and Culture in Indonesia. Research in International Studies, Southeast Asia Series. Ohio University Press. ISBN 0-89680-212-4.
- Liaw, Yock F. (2013). A History of Classical Malay Literature. Local History and Memoirs. Translated by Bahari, R.; Aveling, H. Institute of Southeast Asian Studies. ISBN 978-981-4459-88-4.
- Mackie, J. (2010). "Patrimonialism: The New Order and Beyond". In Aspinall, E.; Fealy, G. (eds.). Soeharto's New Order and Its Legacy: Essays in Honour of Harold Crouch. Asian Studies Series. ANU Press. pp. 81–96. doi:10.22459/SNOL.08.2010. ISBN 978-1-921666-47-6.
- Mani, A. (2008). "Indians in a Rapidly Transforming Indonesia". In Kesavapany, K.; Mani, A.; Ramasamy, P. (eds.). Rising India and Indian Communities in East Asia. ISEAS Publishing. pp. 229–252. doi:10.1355/9789812308009-019. ISBN 978-981-230-800-9.
- Melvin, J. (2018). The Army and the Indonesian Genocide: Mechanics of Mass Murder. Routledge. doi:10.4324/9781351273329. ISBN 978-1-351-27332-9.
- Mietzner, M. (2006). The Politics of Military Reform in Post-Suharto Indonesia: Elite Conflict, Nationalism, and Institutional Resistance (PDF). Policy Studies. Vol. 23. East-West Center Washington. Archived (PDF) from the original on 5 September 2026.
- Moeliodihardjo, B.Y. (2024). "Higher Education Development and Study Abroad Experiences of Faculty in Indonesia". In Kayashima, N.; Sugimura, M.; Kuroda, K.; Kitamura, Y. (eds.). Impacts of Study Abroad on Higher Education Development: Examining the Experiences of Faculty at Leading Universities in Southeast Asia. Sustainable Development Goals Series. Springer Singapore. pp. 113–137. doi:10.1007/978-981-97-0775-1_7. ISBN 978-981-97-0775-1.
- Munandar, A.A. (2017). "Ancient Religious Artworks in Central Java (8th–10th Century AD)". In Budianta, M.; Budiman, M.; Kusno, A.; Moriyama, M. (eds.). Cultural Dynamics in a Globalized World. Taylor & Francis Group. pp. 661–666. doi:10.1201/9781315225340-92. ISBN 978-1-315-22534-0.
- O'Connor, S.; Bulbeck, D. (2013). "Homo sapiens Societies in Indonesia and South-Eastern Asia". In Cummings, V.; Jordan, P.; Zvelebil, M. (eds.). The Oxford Handbook of the Archaeology and Anthropology of Hunter-Gatherers. Oxford University Press. pp. 346–367. doi:10.1093/oxfordhb/9780199551224.013.018.
- Paramita, B.; Matzarakis, A. (2023). "Urban Biometeorology of Tropical Climate: Af, Am, Aw, a Propensity of 34 Provincial Cities in Indonesia". In Cheshmehzangi, A.; He, B.J.; Sharifi, A.; Matzarakis, A. (eds.). Climate Change and Cooling Cities. Springer Singapore. pp. 283–296. doi:10.1007/978-981-99-3675-5_16. ISBN 978-981-99-3675-5.
- Post-CAVR Technical Secretariat (2013). Chega! The Final Report of the Timor-Leste Commission for Reception, Truth and Reconciliation (CAVR): A Plain Guide (PDF). KPG in cooperation with STP-CAVR. Archived (PDF) from the original on 15 April 2026.
- Ricklefs, M.C. (2001). A History of Modern Indonesia Since c. 1200 (3rd ed.). Stanford University Press. ISBN 978-0-8047-4480-5 – via Internet Archive.
- Robinson, G.B. (2018). The Killing Season: A History of the Indonesian Massacres, 1965–66. Princeton University Press. ISBN 978-1-4008-8886-3. JSTOR j.ctvc774sg.
- Sari, Wiwi D. (2023). Guide Arsip Olahraga, 1839–2005 [Guide to Sports Archives, 1839–2005] (PDF) (in Indonesian). Republic of Indonesia National Archives. Archived from the original on 21 November 2025.
- Sedana, I.N.; Foley, K. (2016). "Traditional Indonesian Theatre". In Liu, S. (ed.). Routledge Handbook of Asian Theatre. Routledge. pp. 71–94. ISBN 978-0-415-82155-1.
- Sen, K.; Hill, D.T. (2000). Media, Culture and Politics in Indonesia. Oxford University Press. ISBN 978-0-19-553703-1.
- Setijadi, C. (2017). Harnessing the Potential of the Indonesian Diaspora. Trends in Southeast Asia. ISEAS–Yusof Ishak Institute. doi:10.1355/9789814786928. ISBN 978-981-4786-92-8.
- Sneddon, J.N. (2003). The Indonesian Language: Its History and Role in Modern Society. University of New South Wales Press Ltd. ISBN 0-86840-598-1.
- Steimer-Herbet, T. (2018). Indonesian Megaliths: A Forgotten Cultural Heritage. Archaeopress. ISBN 978-1-78491-844-6. JSTOR jj.15136043.
- Suarta, I Made (2022). Pengantar Bahasa dan Sastra Indonesia: Sejarah dan Perkembangannya [Introduction to Indonesian Language and Literature: Its History and Development] (PDF) (in Indonesian). Pustaka Larasan. Archived from the original (PDF) on 7 June 2024.
- Taylor, J.G. (2003). Indonesia: Peoples and Histories. Yale University Press. ISBN 0-300-09709-3. JSTOR j.ctt1nq2mr – via Internet Archive.
- Vickers, A. (2013). A History of Modern Indonesia (2nd ed.). Cambridge University Press. ISBN 978-1-107-62445-0.
- Weintraub, A.N. (2004). Power Plays: Wayang Golek Puppet Theater of West Java. Ohio University Research in International Studies: Southeast Asia Series. Vol. 110. Ohio University Press; Institute of Southeast Asian Studies. ISBN 981-230-249-2.
- van Zanten, W. (2011). "The Discourse on Islam and Music in West Java, with Emphasis on the Music Group, Ath-Thawaf". In Harnish, D.; Rasmussen, A. (eds.). Divine Inspirations: Music and Islam in Indonesia. Oxford University Press. pp. 241–265. doi:10.1093/acprof:oso/9780195385410.001.0001. ISBN 978-0-19-538541-0.

==== Journal articles ====
- Aditia, R.; Szell, K. (2025). "Belonging Matters: How Context and Inequalities Shape Student Achievement in Indonesia". International Journal of Educational Research Open. 9 100512. doi:10.1016/j.ijedro.2025.100512.
- Agustyati, K.; Pratama, H.; Birnir, Jóhanna K.; Overos, H.; Okthariza, N.; Kholidin, I.; Ramadhanil, F.; Savirani, A. (2025). "Indonesia Election Archive: Institutions, Candidates and Results". Scientific Data. 12 (1) 1397. Bibcode:2025NatSD..12.1397A. doi:10.1038/s41597-025-05746-7. PMC 12336297. PMID 40784948.
- Al Qurtuby, S. (2017). "Arabs and "Indo-Arabs" in Indonesia: Historical Dynamics, Social Relations and Contemporary Changes". International Journal of Asia Pacific Studies. 13 (2): 45–72. doi:10.21315/ijaps2017.13.2.3.
- Andréfouët, S.; Paul, M.; Farhan, A. Riza (2022). "Indonesia's 13558 Islands: A New Census from Space and a First Step Towards a One Map for Small Islands Policy". Marine Policy. 135 104848. Bibcode:2022MarPo.13504848A. doi:10.1016/j.marpol.2021.104848.
- Andriani, Nanda P.; Murtono, T. (2025). "Representation of Women in Indonesian Horror Movie Posters: From Victims to Iconic Mystical Figures". West Science Social and Humanities Studies. 3 (5): 726–737. doi:10.58812/wsshs.v3i05.1918.
- Anwar, D.F. (2018). "Indonesia's Vision of Regional Order in East Asia amid U.S.-China Rivalry". Asia Policy. 13 (2): 57–63. doi:10.1353/asp.2018.0024.
- Ariwibowo, Gregorius A.; Yayusman, Meilinda S.; Huda, Ahmad N.; Mulyasari, Prima N.; Priyatmoko, R.; Trihartono, A. (2026). "Indonesian Cuisine in the Netherlands and France: A Gastrodiplomacy Strategy". Suvannabhumi. 18 (1): 75–107. doi:10.22801/svn.2026.18.1.75.
- As-syakur, A.R.; Tanaka, T.; Osawa, T.; Mahendra, Made S. (2013). "Indonesian Rainfall Variability Observation Using TRMM Multi-Satellite Data". International Journal of Remote Sensing. 34 (21): 7723–7738. Bibcode:2013IJRS...34.7723A. doi:10.1080/01431161.2013.826837.
- Austin, K.G.; Schwantes, A.; Gu, Y.; Kasibhatla, P.D. (2019). "What Causes Deforestation in Indonesia?". Environmental Research Letters. 14 (2) 024007. Bibcode:2019ERL....14b4007A. doi:10.1088/1748-9326/aaf6db.
- Badurdeen, Fathima A.; Carpenedo, M.; Slump, J.; Smidt, L.; Wilson, Erin K. (2026). "The Right to Freedom of Religion or Belief of Minority Communities". The Review of Faith & International Affairs. 24 (1): 68–81. doi:10.1080/15570274.2026.2620353.
- Baier, M. (2007). "The Development of the Hindu Kaharingan Religion: A New Dayak Religion in Central Kalimantan". Anthropos. 102 (2): 566–570. JSTOR 40389742.
- Baird, N. (2025). "The Universal Periodic Review and West Papua: Beyond Invisibility?". International Journal on Minority and Group Rights. 32 (1): 24–60. doi:10.1163/15718115-bja10158.
- Barnes, P.A.; Aninta, Sabhrina G.; Ariyanto, T.; Holle, Mukhlish J.M.; Ikhawan, M. Khairul (2023). "The Gap Between Policy and Practice for Human Rights in Conservation: A Case Study in Papua Province, Indonesia". Oryx. 57 (3): 360–369. doi:10.1017/S0030605323000066.
- Barter, Shane J.; Wangge, Hipolitus R. (2021). "Indonesian Autonomies: Explaining Divergent Self-Government Outcomes in Aceh and Papua". Publius: The Journal of Federalism. 52 (1): 55–81. doi:10.1093/publius/pjab009.
- Brumm, A.; Jensen, G.M.; van den Bergh, G.D.; Morwood, M.J.; Kurniawan, I.; Aziz, F.; Storey, M. (2010). "Hominins on Flores, Indonesia, by One Million Years Ago". Nature. 464 (7289): 748–752. Bibcode:2010Natur.464..748B. doi:10.1038/nature08844. PMID 20237472.
- Butt, S. (2010). "Regional Autonomy and Legal Disorder: The Proliferation of Local Laws in Indonesia". Singapore Journal of Legal Studies: 1–21. JSTOR 24870542.
- Cammack, M.; Feener, R. Michael (2012). "The Islamic Legal System in Indonesia". Pacific Rim Law & Policy Journal. 21 (1): 13–42.
- Campbell, S. (2014). "Kamasan Art in Museum Collections: 'Entangled' Histories of Art Collecting in Bali". Bijdragen tot de Taal-, Land- en Volkenkunde. 170: 250–280. doi:10.1163/22134379-17002001.
- Chauvel, R. (2021). "West Papua: Indonesia's Last Regional Conflict". Small Wars & Insurgencies. 32 (6): 913–944. doi:10.1080/09592318.2021.1990491.
- Chowdhury, A.; Sugema, I. (2005). "How Significant and Effective Has Foreign Aid to Indonesia Been?". ASEAN Economic Bulletin. 22 (2): 186–216. doi:10.1355/AE22-2D. JSTOR 25773853.
- Cribb, R. (2002). "Unresolved Problems in the Indonesian Killings of 1965–1966". Asian Survey. 42 (4): 550–563. doi:10.1525/as.2002.42.4.550.
- Cummins, P.R. (2017). "Geohazards in Indonesia: Earth Science for Disaster Risk Reduction – Introduction". Geological Society, London, Special Publications. 441 (1): 1–7. Bibcode:2017GSLSP.441....1C. doi:10.1144/SP441.11.
- Dagg, Christopher J. (2007). "The 2004 Elections in Indonesia: Political Reform and Democratisation". Asia Pacific Viewpoint. 48 (1): 47–59. doi:10.1111/j.1467-8373.2007.00329.x.
- Dahlan, A.F.; Adi, I.R. (2025). "Ideology, Values and Norms in Hip-Hop Community Wijilan Yogyakarta: An Ethnographic Study". Rubikon: Journal of Transnational American Studies. 12 (1): 57–85. doi:10.22146/rubikon.v12i1.101571.
- Edinger, E.N.; Jompa, J.; Limmon, Gino V.; Widjatmoko, W.; Risk, Michael J. (1998). "Reef Degradation and Coral Biodiversity in Indonesia: Effects of Land-Based Pollution, Destructive Fishing Practices and Changes over Time". Marine Pollution Bulletin. 36 (8): 617–630. Bibcode:1998MarPB..36..617E. doi:10.1016/S0025-326X(98)00047-2.
- Erviana, H.Y.; Basrani, Astrid M.; Tamba, Angela BR; Wulandari, W.; Sinaga, Jona B.B. (2024). "Election Logistics Distribution Strategy in Indonesia: A Literature Review". International Journal of Integrative Sciences. 3 (12): 1375–1386.
- Estoque, R.C.; Ooba, M.; Avitabile, V.; Hijioka, Y.; DasGupta, R.; Togawa, T.; Murayama, Y. (2019). "The Future of Southeast Asia's Forests". Nature Communications. 10 (1) 1829. Bibcode:2019NatCo..10.1829E. doi:10.1038/s41467-019-09646-4. PMC 6478739. PMID 31015425.
- Farid, H. (2005). "Indonesia's Original Sin: Mass Killings and Capitalist Expansion, 1965–66". Inter-Asia Cultural Studies. 6 (1): 3–16. doi:10.1080/1462394042000326879.
- Fossati, D. (2019). "The Resurgence of Ideology in Indonesia: Political Islam, Aliran and Political Behaviour". Journal of Current Southeast Asian Affairs. 38 (2): 119–148. doi:10.1177/1868103419868400.
- Fukuoka, Y. (2014). "Debating Indonesia's Reformasi: Bridging "Parallel Universes"". Journal of Contemporary Asia. 44 (3): 540–552. doi:10.1080/00472336.2014.895026.
- Gertisser, R.; Self, S. (2015). "The Great 1815 Eruption of Tambora and Future Risks from Large-Scale Volcanism". Geology Today. 31 (4): 132–136. Bibcode:2015GeolT..31..132G. doi:10.1111/gto.12099.
- Gindarsah, I.; Priamarizki, A. (2021). "Explaining Indonesia's Under-balancing: The Case of the Modernisation of the Air Force and the Navy". Journal of Asian Security and International Affairs. 8 (3): 391–412. doi:10.1177/23477970211039645.
- Głąb, K.M. (2020). "The Culture of Pancasila: An Indonesian Concept That Fuses the Impossible". Acta Asiatica Varsoviensia (33): 5–22.
- Gunawan, H.; Setyawati, T.; Atmoko, T.; Subarudi; et al. (2024). "A Review of Forest Fragmentation in Indonesia Under the DPSIR Framework for Biodiversity Conservation Strategies". Global Ecology and Conservation. 51 e02918. Bibcode:2024GEcoC..5102918G. doi:10.1016/j.gecco.2024.e02918.
- Harijanti, Susi D.; Lindsey, T. (2006). "Indonesia: General Elections Test the Amended Constitution and the New Constitutional Court". International Journal of Constitutional Law. 4 (1): 138–150. doi:10.1093/icon/moi055.
- Hatley, B. (2008). "Indonesian Theatre Ten Years After Reformasi". Journal of Indonesian Social Sciences and Humanities. 1: 53–72.
- de Hontheim, A. (2010). "Imagination Behind Shape: The Invisible Content of Asmat Artefacts". Anthropological Forum. 20 (3): 235–249. doi:10.1080/00664677.2010.515292.
- Hutomo, M.; Moosa, M.K. (2005). "Indonesian Marine and Coastal Biodiversity: Present Status" (PDF). Indian Journal of Marine Sciences. 34 (1): 88–97. Archived (PDF) from the original on 23 June 2025.
- Jati, Ignasius R.A.P. (2014). "Local Wisdom Behind Tumpeng as an Icon of Indonesian Traditional Cuisine". Nutrition & Food Science. 44 (4): 324–334. doi:10.1108/NFS-11-2013-0141.
- Karuniasa, M.; Pambudi, P.A. (2022). "The Analysis of the El Niño Phenomenon in the East Nusa Tenggara Province, Indonesia". Journal of Water and Land Development (52): 180–185. doi:10.24425/jwld.2022.140388.
- de Koninck, R.; Hai, P.T. (2025). "Coping with Density: Reflections on Java (1960-2010)". Singapore Journal of Tropical Geography. 46 (3): 371–385. Bibcode:2025SJTG...46..371D. doi:10.1111/sjtg.70025.
- Koulakov, I.; Yudistira, T.; Lühr, Birger-G.; Wandono (2009). "P, S Velocity and VP/VS Ratio Beneath the Toba Caldera Complex (Northern Sumatra) from Local Earthquake Tomography". Geophysical Journal International. 177 (3): 1121–1139. doi:10.1111/j.1365-246X.2009.04114.x.
- van der Kroef, J.M. (1951). "The Term Indonesia: Its Origin and Usage". Journal of the American Oriental Society. 71 (3): 166–171. doi:10.2307/595186. JSTOR 595186.
- Legge, John D. (1968). "General Suharto's New Order". International Affairs. 44 (1): 40–47. doi:10.2307/2613527. JSTOR 2613527.
- Lis, M. (2019). "The Art of Wayang". Art of the Orient. 8: 137–150. doi:10.11588/ao.2019.0.10636.
- Lubis, M.S.; Susanto, D.; Harjoko, T.Y. (2021). "Understanding Riverine Urbanism in Kalimantan Through Diachronic Approach: Case Study of Lanting Settlements in Sintang, Indonesia". Journal of Architectural Design and Urbanism. 4 (1): 12–26. doi:10.14710/jadu.v4i1.12133.
- Maiullari, M. (2004). "Hampatongs in the Daily Life of the Ngaju Dayaks" (PDF). Borneo Research Bulletin. 35: 102–120. Archived (PDF) from the original on 3 June 2026.
- Manguin, P-Y. (2021). "Srivijaya: Trade and Connectivity in the Pre-Modern Malay World". Journal of Urban Archaeology. 3: 87–100. doi:10.1484/J.JUA.5.123677.
- Mardiansjah, F.H.; Rahayu, P.; Rukmana, D. (2021). "New Patterns of Urbanization in Indonesia: Emergence of Non-Statutory Towns and New Extended Urban Regions". Journal of Urban and Regional Analysis. 12 (1): 11–26. Bibcode:2021EnUrA..12...11M. doi:10.1177/0975425321990384.
- Mardiansjah, F.H.; Ma'rif, S.; Sugiri, A. (2023). "Analyzing Urban Population Growth in the Towns of Non-Urban Regions in Java, Indonesia, Using Spatial Analysis". IOP Conference Series: Earth and Environmental Science. 1264 (1) 012012. Bibcode:2023E&ES.1264a2012M. doi:10.1088/1755-1315/1264/1/012012.
- Marlier, Miriam E.; Liu, T.; Yu, K.; Buonocore, Jonathan J.; et al. (2019). "Fires, Smoke Exposure, and Public Health: An Integrative Framework to Maximize Health Benefits From Peatland Restoration". GeoHealth. 3 (7): 178–189. doi:10.1029/2019GH000191.
- Marshall, P. (2018). "The Ambiguities of Religious Freedom in Indonesia". The Review of Faith & International Affairs. 16 (1): 85–96. doi:10.1080/15570274.2018.1433588.
- Mboi, N.; et al. (2022). "The State of Health in Indonesia's Provinces, 1990–2019: A Systematic Analysis for the Global Burden of Disease Study 2019". The Lancet Global Health. 10 (11): e1632–e1645. doi:10.1016/S2214-109X(22)00371-0. PMC 9579357. PMID 36240829.
- McDaniel, J. (2017). "Religious Change and Experimentation in Indonesian Hinduism". International Journal of Dharma Studies. 5 20. doi:10.1186/s40613-017-0056-x.
- Mietzner, M. (2025). "Flirting with Autocracy in Indonesia: Jokowi's Majoritarianism and Its Democratic Legacy". Journal of Current Southeast Asian Affairs. 44 (3): 366–384. doi:10.1177/18681034251318053.
- Morwood, M. J.; Brown, P.; Jatmiko; Sutikna, T.; et al. (2005). "Further Evidence for Small-Bodied Hominins from the Late Pleistocene of Flores, Indonesia". Nature. 437 (7061): 1012–1017. Bibcode:2005Natur.437.1012M. doi:10.1038/nature04022. PMID 16229067.
- Mukminin, A.; Habibi, A.; Prasojo, Lantip D.; Idi, A.; Hamidah, A. (2019). "Curriculum Reform in Indonesia: Moving from an Exclusive to Inclusive Curriculum". Center for Educational Policy Studies Journal. 9 (2): 53–72. doi:10.26529/cepsj.543.
- Mutaqin, Z.Z. (2014). "Penghayat, Orthodoxy and the Legal Politics of the State". Indonesia and the Malay World. 42 (122): 1–23. doi:10.1080/13639811.2014.870771.
- Muttaqin, T. (2018). "Determinants of Unequal Access to and Quality of Education in Indonesia". The Indonesian Journal of Development Planning. 2 (1): 1–23. doi:10.36574/jpp.v2i1.27.
- Nalle, Victor I. W. (2026). "Legislating Civil–Military Relations in Post-Reformasi Indonesia". Global Change, Peace & Security. 37 (2): 125–142. doi:10.1080/14781158.2025.2611247.
- Naylor, R.L.; Battisti, David S.; Vimont, Daniel J.; Falcon, Walter P.; Burke, Marshall B. (2007). "Assessing Risks of Climate Variability and Climate Change for Indonesian Rice Agriculture". Proceedings of the National Academy of Sciences. 104 (19): 7752–7757. Bibcode:2007PNAS..104.7752N. doi:10.1073/pnas.0701825104. PMC 1876519. PMID 17483453.
- Ng, J.; Kurniawan, Y. (2024). "The Parliament and Cooperative Oversight of the Indonesian Armed Forces: Why Civil–Military Relations in Indonesia Is Stable but Still in Transition". Armed Forces & Society. 50 (3): 683–709. doi:10.1177/0095327X221137281.
- Nugraha, R.T.; Komara, Wenda Y.; Krisna, Peggy A.N.; Puspita, Oktafa R.; Muslich, M.; Mardhiah, U.; Marthy, W. (2024). "Evaluating the Effectiveness of Protected Area Management in Indonesia". Oryx. 58 (4): 474–484. doi:10.1017/S003060532300145X.
- Nugroho, A.; Amir, H.; Maududy, I.; Marlina, I. (2021). "Poverty Eradication Programs in Indonesia: Progress, Challenges and Reforms". Journal of Policy Modeling. 43 (6): 1204–1224. doi:10.1016/j.jpolmod.2021.05.002.
- Oh, C. (2024). "Authenticities of K-pop Cover Dance Influencers in/from Bali, Indonesia". Dance Chronicle. 47 (3): 407–432. doi:10.1080/01472526.2024.2384976.
- Okamoto, M. (2014). "Jakartans, Institutionally Volatile". Journal of Current Southeast Asian Affairs. 33 (1): 7–27. doi:10.1177/186810341403300102.
- Oktaviana, A.A.; Joannes-Boyau, R.; Hakim, B.; Burhan, B.; et al. (2024). "Narrative Cave Art in Indonesia by 51,200 Years Ago". Nature. 631 (8022): 814–818. Bibcode:2024Natur.631..814O. doi:10.1038/s41586-024-07541-7. ISSN 0028-0836. PMC 11269172. PMID 38961284.
- Paramaditha, I. (2017). "Film Studies in Indonesia: An Experiment of a New Generation". Journal of the Humanities and Social Sciences of Southeast Asia. 173 (2–3): 357–375. doi:10.1163/22134379-17302006.
- Pepinsky, Thomas B. (2025). "Cleavages, Institutions, and Democracy in Indonesia: The 2024 Elections in Comparative Perspective". Journal of Current Southeast Asian Affairs. 44 (3): 345–365. doi:10.1177/18681034251349467.
- Pincus, J.; Ramli, R. (1998). "Indonesia: From Showcase to Basket Case". Cambridge Journal of Economics. 22 (6): 723–734. doi:10.1093/cje/22.6.723.
- Pope, G.G. (1988). "Recent Advances in Far Eastern Paleoanthropology". Annual Review of Anthropology. 17 (1): 43–77. Bibcode:1988ARAnt..17...43P. doi:10.1146/annurev.an.17.100188.000355.
- Prawira, A.; Suhianto, Y. (2024). "The Development of the Indonesian Football Industry and Its Influence Towards National Reputation". Sentris. 5 (2): 89–99.
- Puspitawati, D. (2018). "Indonesia's Archipelagic Sea Lanes (ASLs) Designation: Rights Turning to Obligations?". Hasanuddin Law Review. 4 (3): 265–280. doi:10.20956/halrev.v4i3.1488.
- Putra, R.R.; Kiyono, J.; Ono, Y.; Parajuli, Hari R. (2012). "Seismic Hazard Analysis for Indonesia". Journal of Natural Disaster Science. 33 (2): 59–70. doi:10.2328/jnds.33.59.
- Rahman, T. (2014). "'Indianization' of Indonesia in an Historical Sketch". International Journal of Nusantara Islam. 1 (2): 56–64. doi:10.15575/ijni.v1i2.26.
- Razak, Tries B.; Alisa, Cut A.G.; Abrar, M.; Ardiwijaya, R.; et al. (2026). "Two Decades of Coral Monitoring Reveal Thermal Stress Thresholds on Indonesian Reefs". Biological Conservation. 318 111781. Bibcode:2026BCons.31811781R. doi:10.1016/j.biocon.2026.111781.
- von Rintelen, K.; Arida, E.; Häuser, C. (2017). "A Review of Biodiversity-Related Issues and Challenges in Megadiverse Indonesia and Other Southeast Asian Countries". Research Ideas and Outcomes. 3 e20860. doi:10.3897/rio.3.e20860.
- Rodríguez, Diego G.; Murtagh, B. (2022). "Situating Anti-LGBT Moral Panics in Indonesia: Homophobia, Criminalisation, Acceptance, and Religiosity". Indonesia and the Malay World. 50 (146): 1–9. doi:10.1080/13639811.2022.2038871.
- Rosser, A.; Fahmi, M. (2018). "The Political Economy of Teacher Management Reform in Indonesia". International Journal of Educational Development. 61: 72–81. doi:10.1016/j.ijedudev.2017.12.005.
- Santoro, A.; Piras, F.; Yu, Q. (2025). "Spatial Analysis of Deforestation in Indonesia in the Period 1950–2017 and the Role of Protected Areas". Biodiversity and Conservation. 34 (9): 3119–3145. Bibcode:2025BiCon..34.3119S. doi:10.1007/s10531-023-02679-8. hdl:2158/1323316.
- Scott, D. (2019). "Indonesia Grapples with the Indo-Pacific: Outreach, Strategic Discourse, and Diplomacy". Journal of Current Southeast Asian Affairs. 38 (2): 194–217. doi:10.1177/1868103419860669.
- Shekhar, V. (2022). "Indonesia's Great-Power Management in the Indo-Pacific: The Balancing Behavior of a "Dove State"". Asia Policy. 17 (4): 123–149. doi:10.1353/asp.2022.0062.
- Slater, D. (2018). "Party Cartelization, Indonesian-Style: Presidential Power-Sharing and the Contingency of Democratic Opposition". Journal of East Asian Studies. 18 (1): 23–46. doi:10.1017/jea.2017.26.
- Struebig, M.J.; Aninta, Sabhrina G.; Beger, M.; Bani, A.; et al. (2022). "Safeguarding Imperiled Biodiversity and Evolutionary Processes in the Wallacea Center of Endemism". BioScience. 72 (11): 1118–1130. PMC 9618277. PMID 36325105.
- Susilo, D.; Wulandari, Luh P.L.; Sukmayeti, E.; Asante, A.; et al. (2025). "Can Indonesia Achieve Universal Health Coverage? Organisational and Financing Challenges in Implementing the National Health Insurance System". SSM - Health Systems. 5 100138. doi:10.1016/j.ssmhs.2025.100138. PMC 12678622. PMID 41358189.
- Tanasaldy, T. (2022). "From Official to Grassroots Racism: Transformation of Anti-Chinese Sentiment in Indonesia". The Political Quarterly. 93 (2): 460–468. doi:10.1111/1467-923X.13148.
- Tresnatri, Florischa A.; Dachlan, Akbar N.; Wibowo, Galuh C.; Pasha, R. (2025). "Stuck in the Middle with You? An Assessment of Income Dynamics in Indonesia". IMF Working Papers. doi:10.5089/9798229032377.001.
- Umar, A.R.M. (2023). "The Rise of the Asian Middle Powers: Indonesia's Conceptions of International Order". International Affairs. 99 (4): 1459–1476.
- Viartasiwi, N. (2018). "The Politics of History in West Papua–Indonesia Conflict". Asian Journal of Political Science. 26 (1): 141–159. doi:10.1080/02185377.2018.1445535.
- de Vos, J.P.; Sondaar, P.Y. (1994). "Dating Hominid Sites in Indonesia". Science. 266 (5191): 1726–1727. Bibcode:1994Sci...266.1726D. doi:10.1126/science.266.5191.1726.b. PMID 7992059.
- Wadipalapa, R.; Nainggolan, P.; Katharina, R. (2026). "Protecting Two Presidents: Legislative Decline in Indonesia's Post-2024 Election Transition". The Journal of Legislative Studies. 32 (2): 263–280. doi:10.1080/13572334.2025.2484488.
- Watts, J.; Sheehan, O.; Greenhill, Simon J.; Gomes-Ng, S.; Atkinson, Quentin D.; Bulbulia, J.; Gray, Russell D. (2015). "Pulotu: Database of Austronesian Supernatural Beliefs and Practices". PLOS ONE. 10 (9) e0136783. Bibcode:2015PLoSO..1036783W. doi:10.1371/journal.pone.0136783. PMC 4580586. PMID 26398231.
- Wessing, R. (2006). "A Community of Spirits: People, Ancestors, and Nature Spirits in Java". Crossroads: An Interdisciplinary Journal of Southeast Asian Studies. 18 (1): 11–111. JSTOR 40860833.
- Wihardja, Maria M.; Ikhsan, M.; Alatas, V. (2025). "Times Are Changing: Can Indonesia Stay the Course?". Bulletin of Indonesian Economic Studies. 61 (2): 169–204. doi:10.1080/00074918.2025.2526824.
- Wijaya, S. (2019). "Indonesian Food Culture Mapping: A Starter Contribution to Promote Indonesian Culinary Tourism". Journal of Ethnic Foods. 6 9. doi:10.1186/s42779-019-0009-3.
- Wiratraman, H. P. (2025). "Indonesia's Press Freedom and Law at Twenty-Five: Achievements, Legal Changes and Continuing Challenges". Jurnal IUS Kajian Hukum dan Keadilan. 13 (2): 290–308. doi:10.29303/ius.v13i2.1761.
- Wiszowaty, M.M.; Wahyuni, I. (2023). "Monarchy in the Republic – Sultanate of Yogyakarta in the Republic of Indonesia". Constitutional Law Review. 76 (6): 321–336. doi:10.15804/ppk.2023.06.23.
- Yabuki, S. (2024). "Professionalism of the Indonesian Armed Forces: New, Old, or Hybrid Professionalism?". Jurnal Wacana Politik. 9 (2): 169–176. doi:10.24198/jwp.v9i2.53960.
- Yampolsky, P. (1995). "Forces for Change in the Regional Performing Arts of Indonesia". Bijdragen tot de Taal-, Land- en Volkenkunde. 151 (4): 700–725. doi:10.1163/22134379-90003035.
- Yang, Jennifer H. (2010). "The Internet in Indonesia: Development and Impact of Radical Websites". Studies in Conflict & Terrorism. 33 (2): 171–191. doi:10.1080/10576100903400605. hdl:10356/79840.
- Zaini, A.Z.A.; Vonnisa, M.; Marzuki, M.; Ramadhan, R. (2023). "Seasonal Variation of Rainfall in Indonesia Under Normal Conditions Without ENSO and IOD Events from 1981-2021". Journal of Research in Science Education. 9 (11): 9899–9909. doi:10.29303/jppipa.v9i11.4569.

==== Reports and studies ====
- Ablaza, C.; et al. (November 2023). Indonesia's Informal Economy: Measurement, Evidence, and a Research Agenda (PDF) (Report). Policy Research Working Paper. World Bank. Archived (PDF) from the original on 31 May 2024.
- ADB (31 August 2026). Key Indicators for Asia and the Pacific 2026: Measuring Deprivation at Household and Individual Level (PDF) (Report). Asian Development Bank. Archived (PDF) from the original on 22 October 2026.
- Aji, A.F.; et al. (2022). One Country, 700+ Languages: NLP Challenges for Underrepresented Languages and Dialects in Indonesia (PDF). Proceedings of the 60th Annual Meeting of the Association for Computational Linguistics (ACL). Association for Computational Linguistics. pp. 7226–7249. Archived (PDF) from the original on 8 October 2026.
- Austin, Peter K. (2014). Aksara Sasak, an Endangered Script and Scribal Practice (PDF). International Workshop on Endangered Scripts of Island Southeast Asia. Institute for Languages and Cultures of Asia and Africa, Tokyo University of Foreign Studies. Archived (PDF) from the original on 3 September 2026.
- Azis, A.A.; Satriawangsa, Baiq N.R. (2024). "From Recipient to Donor: Indonesia's Motives in Giving Foreign Aid to South Pacific 2015-2023". Proceedings of the World Conference on Governance and Social Sciences (WCGSS 2023). Advances in Social Science, Education and Humanities Research. Vol. 843. Atlantis Press. pp. 49–63. doi:10.2991/978-2-38476-236-1_7. ISBN 978-2-38476-235-4.
- Barayre, C.; Callebaut, S.; Hodge, I.; Kidane, Martine J.; Hasannudin, Z. (9 February 2026). Indonesia: eTrade Readiness Assessment (PDF) (Report). United Nations Conference on Trade and Development. Archived (PDF) from the original on 13 March 2026.
- Barron, P.; Rahman, E.; Nugroho, K. (7 October 2013). The Case of Aceh, Indonesia (PDF) (Report). The Contested Corners of Asia. The Asia Foundation. ISBN 978-616-91408-1-8. Archived (PDF) from the original on 22 October 2021.
- BMZ (22 November 2023). The Federal Government's Third Report on the Global Status of Freedom of Religion or Belief (PDF) (Report). Federal Ministry for Economic Cooperation and Development. Archived (PDF) from the original on 16 January 2025.
- EIA (25 August 2025). Country Analysis Brief: Indonesia (PDF) (Report). U.S. Energy Information Administration. Archived (PDF) from the original on 28 August 2026.
- Elias, S.; Noone, C. (December 2011). "The Growth and Development of the Indonesian Economy" (PDF). Reserve Bank of Australia. Archived (PDF) from the original on 27 December 2016.
- Hervandi, R. (10 May 2011). "Reimagining Chinese Indonesians in Democratic Indonesia" (PDF). Asia Pacific Bulletin. East-West Center. Archived (PDF) from the original on 29 August 2020.
- Hwang, Julie C. (2012). Terrorism in Perspective: An Assessment of 'Jihad Project' Trends in Indonesia (Report). East-West Center. JSTOR resrep06463.
- Jukes, A. (2014). Writing and Reading Makassarese (PDF). International Workshop on Endangered Scripts of Island Southeast Asia. Institute for Languages and Cultures of Asia and Africa, Tokyo University of Foreign Studies. Archived (PDF) from the original on 4 September 2026.
- McCulloch, N.; Sjahrir, B.S. (November 2008). Endowments, Location or Luck? Evaluating the Determinants of Sub-National Growth in Decentralized Indonesia (PDF) (Report). Policy Research Working Paper. World Bank. Archived (PDF) from the original on 3 November 2018.
- Moccero, D. (2008). Improving the Business and Investment Climate in Indonesia (PDF) (Report). OECD Economics Department Working Papers. OECD Publishing. Archived (PDF) from the original on 1 March 2026.
- OECD (2023). PISA 2022 Results: Factsheets – Indonesia (PDF) (Report). OECD. Archived (PDF) from the original on 14 November 2024.
- OECD (2024). OECD Economic Surveys: Indonesia (PDF) (Report). OECD. Archived (PDF) from the original on 29 November 2024.
- OECD (2026a). Accelerating Sustainable Infrastructure Investments: Assessing Policies for Planning, Delivery and Financing in Central and Southeast Asia (PDF) (Report). OECD Publishing. Archived (PDF) from the original on 2 July 2026.
- OECD (2026b). Agricultural Policy Monitoring and Evaluation 2026: Enhancing resilience in a world of interconnected risks (PDF) (Report). OECD Publishing. Archived (PDF) from the original on 5 November 2026.
- Pacheco, P.; Gnych, S.; Dermawan, A.; Komarudin, H.; Okarda, B. (2017). The Palm Oil Global Value Chain: Implications for Economic Growth and Social and Environmental Sustainability (PDF) (Report). Working Paper. Center for International Forestry Research (CIFOR). Archived (PDF) from the original on 21 October 2026.
- Pardo, Eldad J.; Setyaningrahayu, Indri R.; Negev, Y. (2025). Indonesia's New Curriculum: Embracing Indigenous Religions (PDF) (Report). IMPACT-se. Archived (PDF) from the original on 19 September 2026.
- Rothenberg, A.D.; Temenggung, D. (October 2019). Place-Based Policies in Indonesia: A Critical Review (PDF) (Report). World Bank. Archived (PDF) from the original on 1 June 2026.
- Syarief, S. (18 April 2024). Indonesian Mainstream Media in the Digital Age: Corporate Convergence, Low-Quality News and Staff Exploitation (PDF) (Report). ISEAS Perspective. ISEAS – Yusof Ishak Institute. Archived (PDF) from the original on 17 September 2024.
- Tejasmara, A.; Nuranti, A.; Budyawati; Nurpalah, C.; et al. (2023). Faharuddin; Rahmawati, M.; Setiawan, E.; Asikin, M. (eds.). Indonesian Population Report 2023 (PDF) (Report). The National Population and Family Planning Board (BKKBN). Archived (PDF) from the original on 17 June 2026.
- United Nations Industrial Development Organization (May 2015). Independent UNIDO Country Evaluation: The Republic of Indonesia (PDF) (Report). United Nations Industrial Development Organization. Archived (PDF) from the original on 2 December 2024.
- United Nations (2025). World Urbanization Prospects 2025: Summary of Results (PDF). Department of Economic and Social Affairs - Population Division (Report). United Nations. Archived (PDF) from the original on 3 May 2026.
- United Nations Department of Economic and Social Affairs, Population Division (July 2024). World Population Prospects 2024: Summary of Results (PDF) (Report). United Nations. Archived (PDF) from the original on 22 January 2025.
- United Nations Development Programme (6 May 2025). Human Development Report 2025 (PDF) (Report). United Nations Development Programme. Archived (PDF) from the original on 6 May 2025.
- United Nations Human Rights Committee (3 May 2024). Concluding Observations on the Second Periodic Report of Indonesia (Report). United Nations. Archived from the original on 13 October 2026.
- USDA (10 November 2026). Grain: World Markets and Trade (PDF) (Report). United States Department of Agriculture. Archived (PDF) from the original on 11 November 2026.
- World Bank (June 2020). Indonesia: Systematic Country Diagnostic Update (PDF) (Report). World Bank. Archived (PDF) from the original on 8 September 2023.
- World Bank (June 2024). Indonesia Economic Prospects, June 2024: Unleashing Indonesia's Business Potential (PDF) (Report). World Bank. Archived (PDF) from the original on 7 August 2024.
- World Bank Group; Asian Development Bank (2021). Climate Risk Profile: Indonesia (2021) (PDF). Climate Change Knowledge Portal (Report). The World Bank Group and Asian Development Bank. Archived (PDF) from the original on 25 May 2021.
- World Tourism Organization (2025). Tourism Doing Business – Investing in Indonesia (PDF) (Report). UN Tourism. Archived (PDF) from the original on 8 June 2025.

==== News and media ====
- "Indonesia vice president resigns amid dispute over eligibility". Al Jazeera. 12 November 2026.
- Santosa, Lia W. (5 February 2026). "Ekonomi Jakarta 2025 berkontribusi tinggi terhadap ekonomi nasional" [Jakarta's economy in 2025 makes large contribution to the national economy]. ANTARA News (in Indonesian). Archived from the original on 25 February 2026.
- "Indonesia's economy grows 5.11 pct on strong consumption". ANTARA News. 5 February 2026. Archived from the original on 10 March 2026.
- "BPS catat peningkatan tipis angka ketimpangan Gini Ratio di 0,368" [BPS reports slight increase in inequality, with Gini ratio at 0.368]. ANTARA News. 5 August 2026. Archived from the original on 6 August 2026.
- "Indonesia's poverty rate falls to 8.07 pct, lowest in recent years". ANTARA News. 5 August 2026. Archived from the original on 7 August 2026.
- Prameswari, Lintang B. (27 August 2026). "Mendikdasmen Sebut Pentingnya Hidupkan Kembali 729 Bahasa Daerah" [Primary and Secondary Education Minister Stresses Importance of Reviving 729 Regional Languages]. ANTARA News (in Indonesian). Archived from the original on 2 September 2026.
- Harris, G. (4 July 2024). "Oldest Example of Figurative Art Found in Indonesian Cave". The Art Newspaper. Archived from the original on 4 July 2024.
- "Global aquatic food trade: The latest findings from SOFIA 2026". FAO GLOBEFISH. Food and Agriculture Organization. 7 July 2026. Archived from the original on 11 November 2026.
- Hatta, M. (April 1953). "Indonesia's Foreign Policy". Foreign Affairs. Vol. 31, no. 3. Council on Foreign Relations. pp. 441–452. Archived from the original on 25 November 2018.
- Pranata, G.; Priyambodo, U. (20 June 2024). "Berkat Soewardi, Nama Indonesia Bermula di Den Haag Sejak 1918" [Thanks to Soewardi, the Name 'Indonesia' Took Root in The Hague in 1918] (in Indonesian). National Geographic Indonesia. Archived from the original on 20 June 2024.
- Arshad, A.; Hamzah, A. (21 September 2024). "Jokowi builds Indonesian infrastructure, but weakens democratic foundations". The Straits Times. Archived from the original on 1 October 2024.
- "Penduduk Indonesia Tembus 290,1 Juta Jiwa, Bonus Demografi Masih Jadi Modal Indonesia Emas 2045" [Indonesia's Population Exceeds 290.1 Million, Demographic Dividend Remains an Asset for Golden Indonesia 2045]. Directorate General of Population and Civil Registration, Ministry of Home Affairs (in Indonesian). 4 August 2026. Archived from the original on 19 October 2026.
- "Keragaman Beragama Indonesia di Data Kependudukan Kemendagri" [Religious Diversity in Indonesia According to Ministry of Home Affairs Population Data] (in Indonesian). Tempo. 13 March 2026. Archived from the original on 14 March 2026.
- "Powering Futures, Transforming Jobs in Eastern Indonesia". World Bank. 26 January 2026. Archived from the original on 24 March 2026.

==== Official and institutional sources ====
- "Eksekusi Mati Tingkat Global Mencapai Angka Tertinggi, Indonesia Terus Jatuhkan Hukuman Mati" [Global Executions Hit Record High as Indonesia Continues to Hand Down Death Sentences] (in Indonesian). Amnesty International Indonesia. 18 May 2026. Archived from the original on 2 October 2026.
- "Plan of Action for the Indonesia-Australia Comprehensive Strategic Partnership (2025–2029)". Australian Government Department of Foreign Affairs and Trade. 15 May 2025. Archived from the original on 27 November 2025.
- BPK (8 January 2002). "Undang-Undang Republik Indonesia Nomor 2 Tahun 2002 Tentang Kepolisian Negara Republik Indonesia" [Law of the Republic of Indonesia Number 2 of 2002 Concerning the Indonesian National Police] (PDF). Audit Board of Indonesia Legal Documentation and Information Network (JDIH) – Regulations Database (in Indonesian). Audit Board of Indonesia. Archived (PDF) from the original on 6 December 2025.
- BPK (8 February 2021). Peraturan Daerah (Perda) Provinsi Daerah Istimewa Yogyakarta Nomor 2 Tahun 2021 tentang Pemeliharaan dan Pengembangan Bahasa, Sastra, dan Aksara Jawa [Regional Regulation of the Province of the Special Region of Yogyakarta Number 2 of 2021 Concerning the Preservation and Development of the Javanese Language, Literature, and Script] (PDF) (Regional Regulation 2) (in Indonesian). Governor of Special Region of Yogyakarta. Archived (PDF) from the original on 13 October 2026.
- BPK (21 December 2021). "Peraturan Menteri Dalam Negeri Republik Indonesia Nomor 58 Tahun 2021 tentang Kode, Data Wilayah Administrasi Pemerintahan, dan Pulau" [Regulation of the Minister of Home Affairs of the Republic of Indonesia No. 58 of 2021 on Codes, Government Administrative Area Data, and Islands] (PDF). Audit Board of Indonesia Legal Documentation and Information Network (JDIH) – Regulations Database (in Indonesian). Audit Board of Indonesia. Archived (PDF) from the original on 27 October 2026.
- BPK (15 February 2022). "Undang-Undang (UU) Nomor 3 Tahun 2022 tentang Ibu Kota Negara" [Law Number 3 of 2022 Concerning the National Capital] (PDF). Audit Board of Indonesia Legal Documentation and Information Network (JDIH) – Regulations Database (in Indonesian). Audit Board of Indonesia. Archived (PDF) from the original on 10 December 2025.
- BPK (29 January 2024). "Keputusan Presiden Republik Indonesia Nomor 8 Tahun 2024 tentang Hari-Hari Libur" [Presidential Decree of the Republic of Indonesia Number 8 of 2024 regarding Holidays] (PDF). Audit Board of Indonesia Legal Documentation and Information Network (JDIH) – Regulations Database (in Indonesian). Audit Board of Indonesia. Archived (PDF) from the original on 7 March 2025.
- BPS (21 January 2021). "Hasil Sensus Penduduk 2020" [Results of the 2020 Population Census] (PDF) (in Indonesian). Statistics Indonesia. Archived from the original (PDF) on 22 January 2021.
- "11.1.1.(a) Persentase Rumah Tangga yang Memiliki Akses Terhadap Hunian Yang Layak Menurut Klasifikasi Desa/Kota" [11.1.1.(a) Percentage of Household With Access to Adequate Housing by Urban Rural Classification] (in Indonesian). Statistics Indonesia. 15 April 2026.
- BPS (5 May 2026). Results of the 2025 Intercensal Population Survey (SUPAS 2025) (Report). Statistics Indonesia.
- BPS (5 May 2026). Labour Situation in Indonesia, February 2026 (Report). Statistics Indonesia.
- "The Historic Journey of the Thomas Cup & Uber Cup". BWF Badminton. Archived from the original on 19 June 2025.
- "President Prabowo Issues Regulation on Duties and Functions of State Ministries in the Red and White Cabinet". Cabinet Secretariat of Indonesia. 22 October 2024. Archived from the original on 16 March 2025.
- "Indonesia - Country Profile". Convention on Biological Diversity. Archived from the original on 19 May 2025.
- "Indonesia at the 1938 FIFA World Cup". FIFA. 20 November 2025. Archived from the original on 7 December 2025.
- "G20 Members". G20. Archived from the original on 10 February 2015.
- "Southeast Asia's Largest and Steadily Economy". IIPC Sydney. Indonesia Investment Promotion Centre. Archived from the original on 9 November 2026.
- "Memahami Perbedaan Data Penduduk Jakarta: Data PBB vs Data Dukcapil" [Understanding the Difference in Jakarta Population Data: UN Data vs. Population and Civil Registration Data] (in Indonesian). Jakarta Population and Civil Registration Office. 27 November 2025. Archived from the original on 29 March 2026.
- Zara, Muhammad Y. "Bhinneka Tunggal Ika". Encyclopedia of Indonesian History (in Indonesian). Ministry of Culture of Indonesia.
- "State Visit by the President of the Republic of Indonesia to Malaysia 27 January 2025". Ministry of Foreign Affairs, Malaysia. 26 January 2025. Archived from the original on 30 January 2025.
- "Indonesia". Ministry of Foreign Affairs, Singapore. Archived from the original on 17 January 2026.
- Kemenkumham (24 May 2019). The 1945 Constitution of the Republic of Indonesia (PDF) (Report). Ministry of Law and Human Rights of the Republic of Indonesia. Archived (PDF) from the original on 14 November 2025 – via Wikimedia Commons.
- "Data Rujukan Nasional Kelautan" [National Marine Reference Data] (in Indonesian). Ministry of Marine Affairs and Fisheries of Indonesia.
- "Neraca Pendidikan Daerah (NPD) 2025" [Regional Education Profile 2025]. Neraca Pendidikan Daerah (in Indonesian). Ministry of Primary and Secondary Education.
- "Siaran Pers: Kemensetneg Ajak Seluruh Elemen Bangsa Semarakkan Peringatan HUT Ke-78 Kemerdekaan RI" [Press Release: Ministry of State Secretariat Invites All Elements of the Nation to Celebrate the 78th Anniversary of Indonesian Independence] (in Indonesian). Ministry of State Secretariat of Indonesia. 31 July 2023. Archived from the original on 1 December 2023.
- "Satu Dekade Pembangunan Infrastruktur Transportasi Indonesia" [A Decade of Transport Infrastructure Development in Indonesia]. Ministry of Transportation of Indonesia (in Indonesian). 22 May 2024. Archived from the original on 24 March 2025.
- "The Sculpture of Indonesia". National Gallery of Art. 1990. Archived from the original on 27 August 2026.
- "5 Facts About Muslims and Christians in Indonesia". Pew Research Center. 2024. Archived from the original on 15 May 2024.
- "Indonesia – Intangible Heritage, Cultural Sector". UNESCO. Archived from the original on 16 March 2026.
- "Toba Caldera UNESCO Global Geoparks". UNESCO Global Geoparks. Archived from the original on 13 March 2024.
- "Lorentz National Park". UNESCO World Heritage Centre. Archived from the original on 15 September 2026.
- "Growth in United Nations membership". United Nations. "60 Members (1950) [...] 117 Members (1965)* [...] 122 Members (1966)*"
- Widyawati, S. (11 July 2024). "United Nations Thanks Indonesia for Its Contribution to Peacekeeping". indonesia.un.org. United Nations. Archived from the original on 31 August 2026.
- "Agreement Between the Republic of Indonesia and the Kingdom of the Netherlands Concerning West New Guinea (New York Agreement)". UN Peacemaker. United Nations Department of Political and Peacebuilding Affairs. 15 August 1962. Archived from the original on 26 January 2022.
- "A Sustainable Ocean Economy is Key to Indonesia's Prosperity". World Bank. 25 March 2021. Archived from the original on 15 October 2021.
- "Indonesia – Member profile". WTO Tariff & Trade Data. World Trade Organization. 2025. Archived from the original on 11 October 2026.

==== Reference works and databases ====
- "Indonesia". The World Factbook (2025 ed.). Central Intelligence Agency. 3 December 2025.
- "Indonesia Definition & Meaning". Dictionary.com. Archived from the original on 9 May 2022.
- Hall, R. (2009). "Indonesia, Geology" (PDF). In Gillespie, R.G.; Clague, D.A. (eds.). Encyclopedia of Islands. University of California Press. pp. 454–460. doi:10.1525/9780520943728-104. ISBN 978-0-520-94372-8. Archived (PDF) from the original on 16 April 2024.
- Reni, Dewi S.; Renaldi, J. (November–December 2019). "The Indonesian Legal System and Legal Research". Hauser Global Law School Program, New York University School of Law. Archived from the original on 22 August 2026.
- "World Economic Outlook Database (October 2026 Edition)". International Monetary Fund. 13 October 2026.
- "Indonesia". Merriam-Webster.com Dictionary. Merriam-Webster. Archived from the original on 13 November 2025.
- "Indonesia (INA)". Olympedia. Archived from the original on 27 September 2026.
- "Malnutrition: Share of children who are stunted, 2024". Our World in Data. 2024.
- "Share of the Population Using the Internet - Indonesia". Our World in Data. 2024.
- "Share of People Living in Urban Areas, 2025". Our World in Data. 2025.
- Fakhri, M.; Reynolds, K. (30 March 2017). "The Bandung Conference". Oxford Bibliographies in International Law. Oxford University Press.
- Hamzah, H.; Narang, Agnesya M.; Yusari, A. (2021). "Legal Systems in Indonesia: Overview". Practical Law. Thomson Reuters. Archived from the original on 19 March 2025 – via liScholar, Yale University.
- "QS World University Rankings 2027". QS Top Universities. 2026.
- "Median Age of Population – Indonesia". Population Division Data Portal. United Nations Department of Economic and Social Affairs, Population Division. 2026.
- "Labor force participation rate (% of population)". World Bank Gender Data Portal. World Bank.
- "Indonesia - Data". World Bank Open Data. World Bank. Archived from the original on 10 October 2026.
