= History of the Indonesia national football team =

From 1934 onwards

In 2026, Indonesia kit manufacturer Kelme introduced the national emblem protected by a shield

The history of the Indonesia national football team officially dates back to their first international in 1934. The Football Association of Indonesia (PSSI), which governs the team. Prior to Indonesian independence, in the period 1921–1945, the national team used the name Dutch East Indies and was organized by the Dutch East Indies Football Union (NIVU). The team later became a member of the football international governing bodies FIFA in 1928 and participated at the 1938 FIFA World Cup in France as the first Asian country to qualify for the final round of the competition. After the country gained independence, they then rejoined FIFA in 1952 and co-founded AFC in 1954. As of August 2024, Indonesia has qualified for the FIFA World Cup once and the AFC Asian Cups six times (including automatic qualification as co-hosts in 2007).

== Men's team ==
=== 1921–1938: Colonization era ===
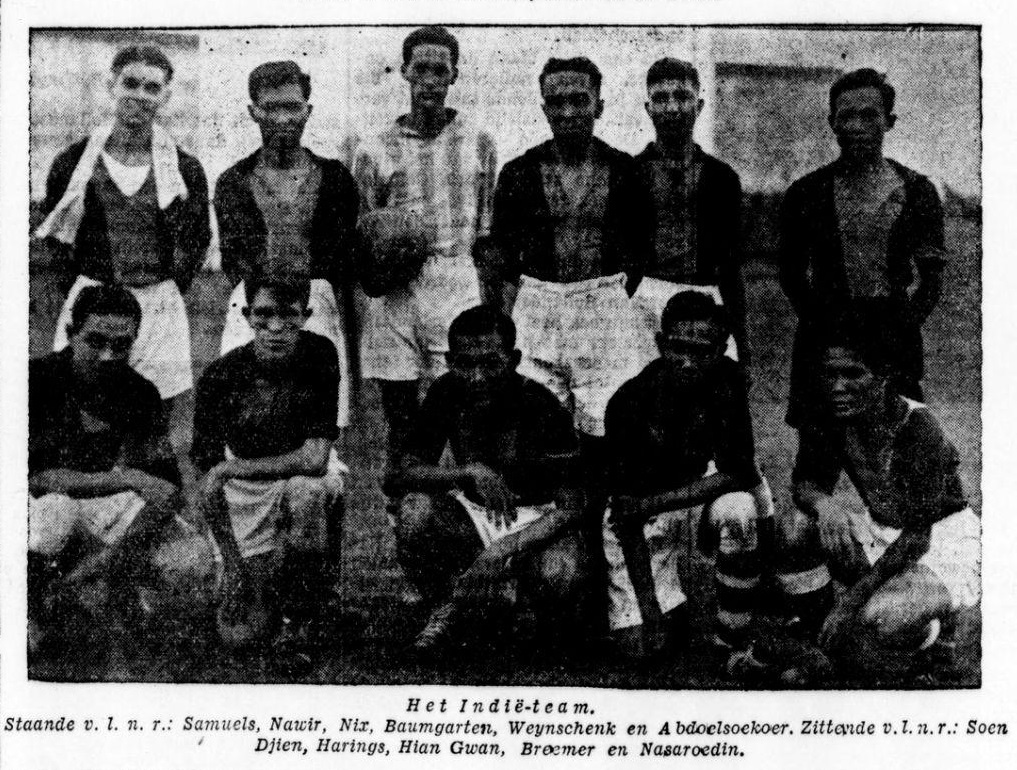
Dutch East Indies squad's pioneer, the predecessor of the Indonesia national team

Dutch East Indies, or Netherlands East Indies was the national team that represented the territory of present-day Indonesia during the Dutch colonial era. The team was organized by the Dutch East Indies Football Union (NIVU), which became a member of FIFA on 24 May 1924. The first recorded unofficial match of the Dutch East Indies was against Singapore on 28 March 1921 in Batavia, which ended in a 1–0 win. This was followed by matches in August 1928 against Australia (2–1 win) and in 1930 against a team from Shanghai, China (4–4 draw).

On 19 April 1930, Football Association of Indonesia (PSSI) was founded with Soeratin Sosrosoegondo as the first leader, after most all non-national organizations in the country such as VIJ Jakarta, BIVB Bandung, PSM Mataram, IVBM Magelang, VVB Solo, MVB Madiun, and SIVB Surabaya gathered at a meeting in Soerakarta and agreed to form the second national football organization in order to resist the Dutch control of the colonies by gathering all the footballers to play under PSSI.

In 1934, a team from Java represented the Dutch East Indies in the Far Eastern Games in Manila, Philippines. The team managed to beat Japan 7–1 in the first match, but the last two matches ended in defeat, 0–2 to China and 2–3 to the Philippines, resulting in the team finishing second in the tournament. These matches are considered by World Football Elo Ratings to be the first matches involving the Indonesia national team. On 9 June 1935, two national organizations, NIVU and PSSI, joined forces and worked together to contribute players to the national team. NIVU remained the official football association of the Dutch East Indies and was admitted to FIFA membership on 14 August 1936, after first becoming a member in 1924.

=== 1938–1945: Asia's first World Cup participant ===
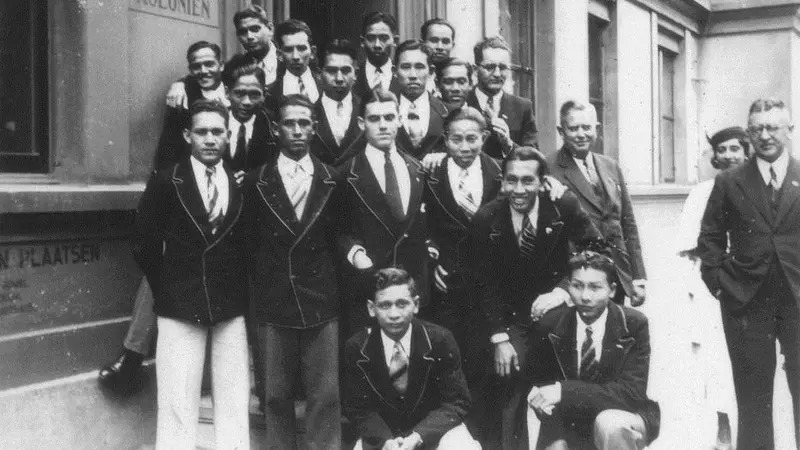
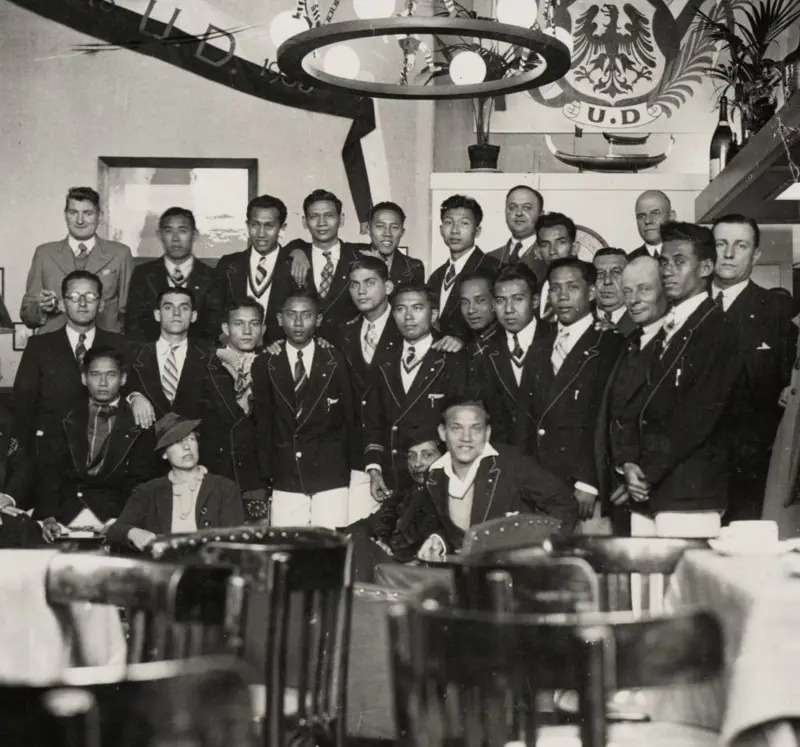
Dutch East Indies squad for the 1938 edition of the World Cup

Dutch East Indies made its World Cup debut during the 1938 edition in France. The team advanced to the final round without playing any qualifying matches. Japan, who were drawn in Group 12 of the qualifying round with the Dutch East Indies, decided to withdraw from the competition. The Dutch East Indies were then ordered by FIFA to carry out a play-off match against one of the Group 11 participants, the United States. The match was scheduled to be played on 29 May 1938, but never took place after the United States also decided to withdraw from the competition. This allowed the Dutch East Indies to advance to the final round as the Asia's first World Cup participant.

In the final round, the Dutch East Indies were coached by Johan Mastenbroek who also served as chairman of the Dutch East Indies Football Association (NIVU). The team consisted of 17 players and was captained by a local Indonesian, Achmad Nawir. In the competition which still used the knockout format, the Dutch East Indies were eliminated in the first round when they were defeated by Hungary 0–6. This match took place on 5 June 1938 at the Stade Municipal, Reims. At the end of the competition, Hungary who had previously eliminated the Dutch East Indies, became the runner-up of the competition after being defeated by Italy 2–4 in the final.

=== 1945–1984: Independence era ===
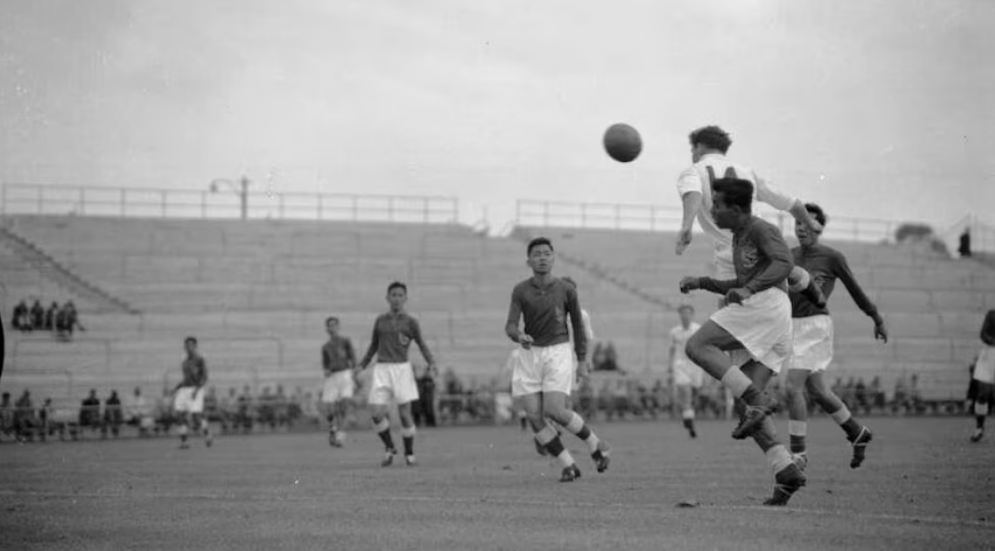
Indonesia's match against the Soviet Union at the 1956 Summer Olympics in Melbourne. The match ended in a goalless draw

After the Second World War, followed by the Indonesian Revolution in 1947, the national team no longer used the name Dutch East Indies and replacing it with the name Indonesia. The previous national football organization, the Dutch East Indies Football Union (NIVU) was succeeded by the Football Association of Indonesia (PSSI). The team's first official match under the name Indonesia was on 5 March 1951 at the Asian Games, where they lost 0–3 by the host nation India at the National Stadium, New Delhi.

Indonesia qualified for the 1956 Olympics in Melbourne. The team advanced directly to the quarter-finals of the tournament after the withdrawal of their first-round opponents, South Vietnam. In the quarter-finals, the team met the Soviet Union who had previously defeated the United Team of Germany 2–1. The match was held on 29 November 1956, where Indonesia forced the Soviet Union to a goalless draw. This resulted the match being replayed two days later where the team lost 0–4.

In 1957, Indonesia dominated the qualifying round of the 1958 World Cup. The team defeated China in the first round, then subsequently refused to play its next opponents, Israel, for political reasons. Indonesian player Rusli Ramang became the top scorer at the end of the competition with 4 goals.

Indonesia won the bronze medal at the 1958 Asian Games where the team beat India 4–1 in the third-place match. The team also drew 2–2 with East Germany in a friendly match. Indonesia won Merdeka Tournament trophy on three occasions (1961, 1962 and 1969). The team were also champions of the 1968 King's Cup. Indonesia returned to World Cup qualification rounds in 1974 as the team was eliminated in the first round, with only one win from six matches, against New Zealand. During the qualification round of 1978 World Cup, Indonesia won a single of four matches, against the host team, Singapore. Four years later, in 1982, Indonesia won two World Cup qualifying matches, over Chinese Taipei and Australia.

=== 1985–1995: Renaissance of Indonesia football ===
The 1986 FIFA World Cup qualification round saw Indonesia advance from the first round with four wins, one draw, and one loss, eventually finishing at the top of its group. South Korea emerged victorious over Indonesia in the second round. The team reached the semi-final of the 1986 Asian Games after beating the United Arab Emirates in the quarter-finals. Indonesia then lost to host South Korea in the semi-finals and lost to Kuwait in the bronze medal match.

A milestone during this era was the gold medal victory at the Southeast Asian Games in both 1987 and 1991. In 1987, Indonesia beat Malaysia 1–0; while in 1991, it beat Thailand in a penalty shoot-out. In the 1990 World Cup qualifiers, the Indonesian team lost in the first round, with only one win against Hong Kong, three draws and two defeats. The team also only managed a single victory against Vietnam in the 1994 World Cup qualification round.

=== 1995–2016: Continental appearances ===
==== 1996 AFC Asian Cup ====
Indonesia's first appearance in the AFC Asian Cup was against United Arab Emirates in the 1996 AFC Asian Cup. During the tournament, Indonesia only scored a single point from a 2–2 draw against Kuwait in the first round.

==== 1998 Tiger Cup ====
In the final group stage match of the 1998 Tiger Cup, Indonesia faced Thailand while the both teams already through to the semi-finals, but were also aware that the winner would have to face hosts Vietnam. Indonesia's Mursyid Effendi deliberately kicked the ball into Indonesia's own goal as Thailand's attacker ran towards the ball. FIFA fined both teams $40,000 for "violating the spirit of the game" while Effendi was banned from international association football for a lifetime. Indonesia was rewarded with a match by the team they wanted to face; minnows Singapore (who they ironically lost 2–1 to) in the semi-finals.

==== 2000 AFC Asian Cup ====
The team's second appearance in the Asian Cup was in Lebanon in the 2000 AFC Asian Cup; again, the Indonesian team gained only one point from three games, and again, from a match against Kuwait that finished without a score from either side. Indonesia established a higher record in the 2004 AFC Asian Cup, beating Qatar 2–1 to record the team's first-ever victory in the history of the tournament. The win was not enough for it to qualify for the second round, having fallen 0–5 to host China and 1–3 to Bahrain.

==== 2004 AFC Asian Cup ====
Indonesia then qualified for their third successful tournament in the 2004 AFC Asian Cup being grouped with China, Qatar, and Bahrain with them winning the only match against Qatar in a 2–1 victory but crashed out of the tournament with only three points.

==== 2007 AFC Asian Cup ====
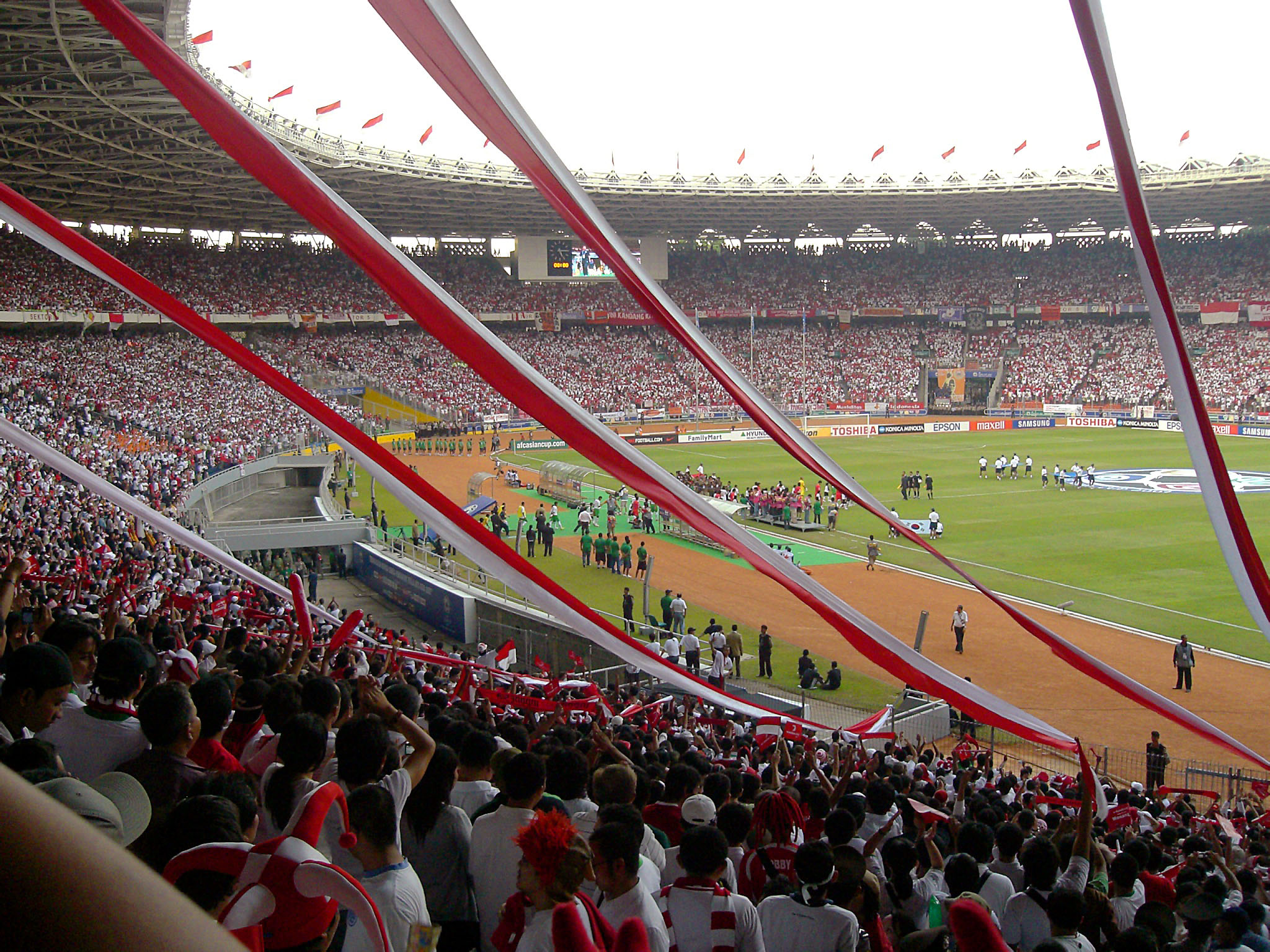
Indonesian fans at the Gelora Bung Karno Stadium, Jakarta during the 2007 AFC Asian Cup

The 2007 AFC Asian Cup saw Indonesia co-hosting the tournament with Malaysia, Thailand and Vietnam becoming the first time in the AFC Asian Cup history that four countries co-hosted the competition. In the opening match of the tournament, Indonesia faces Bahrain with goals coming from Budi Sudarsono and Bambang Pamungkas to secure a 2–1 win. However, in the following two matches, Indonesia suffered a 2–1 defeat to Saudi Arabia and narrowly losing to South Korea 1–0 which Indonesia failed to qualified to the knockout stage of the tournament.

==== AFF Championship ====
Indonesia reached the finals of AFF Championship on six occasions (2000, 2002, 2004, 2010, 2016, and 2020), albeit never managing to lift the trophy victoriously. The team's claim of regional titles came in the Southeast Asian Games of 1987 and 1991.

After the Peter Withe era, the inability to fulfill the ASEAN target has been cited as the reason for Indonesia's "revolving door" in terms of team managers. Over two years, Indonesia's manager changed from Kolev to local coach Benny Dollo who was in turn sacked in 2010. The head coach position was then held by Alfred Riedl who failed to lift any cups and in July 2011 was then replaced by Wim Rijsbergen.

=== 2012–2016: Suspensions ===
In March 2012, PSSI received a warning for the divided state of Indonesian football, whereby two separate leagues existed: the rebel Indonesia Super League (ISL), which isn't recognized by PSSI or FIFA, and the Indonesia Premier League (IPL). The National Sports Committee (KONI) encouraged PSSI to work collaboratively with Indonesian Football Savior Committee (KPSI) officials to rectify the situation but KONI chairman Tono Suratman stated in March 2012 that KONI would take over the beleaguered PSSI if matters are not improved. FIFA did not state whether Indonesia would face suspension, but on 20 March 2012, FIFA made an announcement. In the lead-up to 20 March 2012, PSSI struggled to resolve the situation and looked to its annual congress for a final solution. PSSI was given until 15 June 2012 to settle the issues at stake, notably the control of the breakaway league; failing this, the case was to be referred to the FIFA Emergency Committee for suspension. FIFA eventually set a new 1 December 2012 deadline. In the two weeks preceding the deadline, three out of four PSSI representatives withdrew from the joint committee, citing frustrations in dealing with KPSI representatives. However, FIFA stated that it would only issue a punishment to Indonesian football after the Indonesian national squad finished its involvement in the 2012 AFF Championship.

In 2013, the president of PSSI Djohar Arifin Husin signed a Memorandum of understanding (MoU) with La Nyalla Matalitti (KPSI-PSSI) that was initiated by FIFA and the AFC through the Asian Football Confederation's Task Force. Since then, the control of Indonesia Super League was taken by the Joint committee to remain manageable by PT Liga Indonesia until the establishment of a new professional competition by the committee. This means the Indonesian players from ISL were able to play and join the national team. The PSSI called players from both football leagues, ISL and IPL to fortify the national team for the Asian Cup qualifier of 2015. On 7 January 2013, PSSI announced a list of 51 players from both sides of football leagues regardless of whether players from the breakaway Indonesia Super League (ISL) would make an appearance, allegedly ISL clubs were reluctant to release players because they doubted Djohar's leadership.

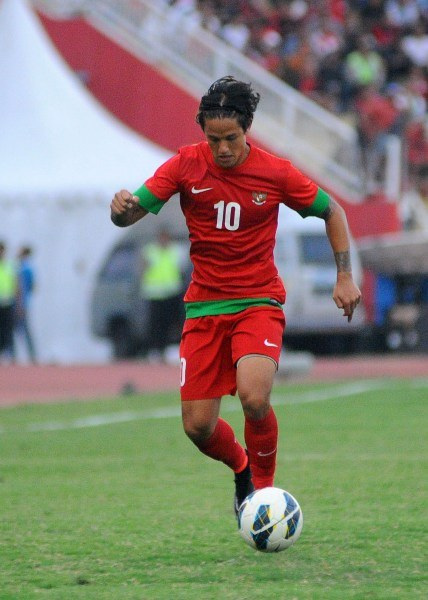
Irfan Bachdim in action during a friendly match against Malaysia at the Gelora Delta Stadium on 14 September 2014. Indonesia won 2–0

On 18 March 2013, PSSI held a congress at Kuala Lumpur, Malaysia. Both parties, PSSI and KPSI (breakaway group) solved their differences in four contentious points; such as; Reunification of two leagues; Revision of the PSSI Statutes; Reinstatement of the four expelled PSSI Executive Committee members La Nyalla Mattalitti, Roberto Rouw, Erwin Dwi Budiawan, and Toni Apriliani; and agreement of all parties to the Memorandum of Understanding from 7 June 2012 on the list of delegates to the PSSI Congress based on the list of the Solo Congress of July 2011. The new PSSI called 58 players from both sides leagues (ISL and IPL) for the national squad. Rahmad Darmawan returned as the caretaker coach of the national team with Jacksen F. Tiago as the assistant coach. They trimmed the 58 players initially called for national training to 28. The list would then be trimmed again to just 23 players for the Saudi Arabia match. Victor Igbonefo, Greg Nwokolo and Sergio van Dijk the three naturalised players were on the final list. On 23 March 2013, Indonesia was defeated 1–2 by Saudi Arabia at home. Boaz Solossa gave Indonesia the first goal in their campaign for AFC Asian Cup qualification; the home team started with the goal in the sixth minute but the Saudi Side fought back with the equalizer from Yahya Al-Shehri in the 14th minute before Yousef Al-Salem the scored what turned out to be the winner on 56th minute.

In 2015, Football Association of Indonesia (PSSI) was suspended by FIFA due to government interference in the domestic competition. The announcement was made on 30 May 2015 and had an immediate impact on the national team. Indonesia would not be eligible to compete in the next round of qualifiers for the 2018 World Cup and 2019 Asian Cup, starting less than two weeks later. FIFA took action against Indonesia following a row between the local government and the football association which has resulted in the cancellation of the domestic competition. The suspension was lifted at the 66th FIFA Congress. By then, hurried perpetration was done for Indonesia in order to get in touch for the upcoming 2016 AFF Championship where Indonesia eventually reached the final and once again fell to Thailand in process.

=== 2017–2019: Rebuilding ===
Some weeks after finishing as runners-up in the 2016 AFF Championship, PSSI held a congress on 8 January 2017 in an effort to sign Spanish coach, Luis Milla to handle their senior and U-22 team. Prior to the 2018 AFF Championship, Milla departed without any explanation, causing anger among Indonesian supporters. Indonesia crashed out from the group stage in the 2018 AFF Championship, which led to the sacking of Bima Sakti. In order to prepare for the 2022 FIFA World Cup qualification campaign, Indonesia signed Scottish coach Simon McMenemy with hope that his successful tenure with the Philippines could reinvigorate Indonesia's performance especially when Indonesia was grouped with three Southeast Asian rivals Malaysia, Thailand and Vietnam alongside UAE. Indonesia lost all four matches including a 2–3 home defeat to Malaysia despite having taken a 2–1 lead prior followed by a home loss to Vietnam for the first time in any competitive tournaments. On 6 November 2019, PSSI decided to sack McMenemy over the national team's deteriorating performance. Indonesia traveled to Malaysia and lost 0–2 to its rival and was officially eliminated from the 2022 FIFA World Cup qualification.

=== 2020–2025: Shin Tae-yong era ===
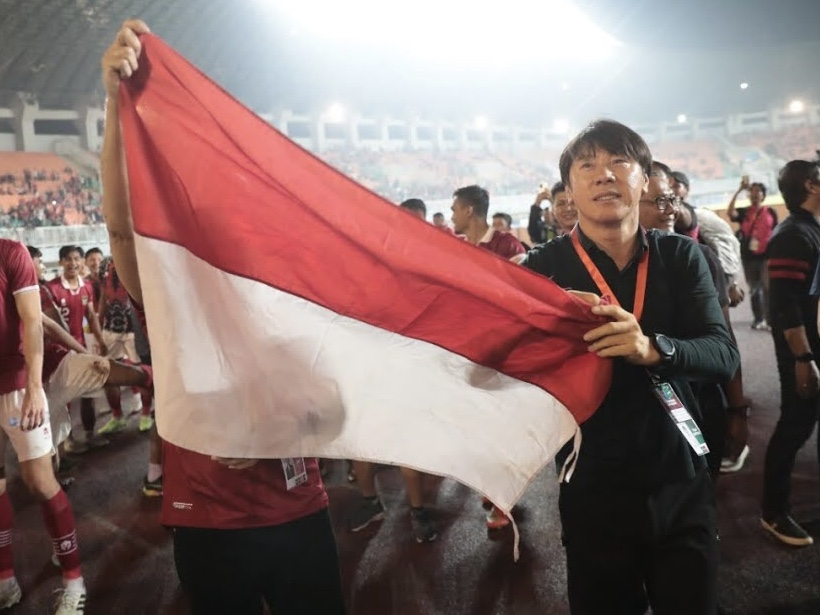
Shin Tae-yong guided Indonesia to the 2020 AFF Championship final and the 2023 AFC Asian Cup

After failing to qualify for the World Cup, PSSI appointed Shin Tae-yong as the head coach of the Indonesian national team, becoming the first South Korean in Indonesia's managerial history. This appointment was based on the success of fellow Korean coach Park Hang-seo in Vietnam. Shin was then tasked with immediately forming a team to compete in the 2023 AFC Asian Cup qualification round.

Under the management of Shin Tae-yong, the majority of the senior team was reshuffled to include many young players of whom the majority were from the Indonesia national under-23 football team. Indonesia made it to the 2020 AFF Championship final with an average player age of 23.

==== 2023 AFC Asian Cup qualification ====
In the 2023 AFC Asian Cup qualification, Indonesia defeated host and former Asian champions, Kuwait, whom they had not defeated in 42 years, 2–1, to the surprise of many people, the first official win by a Southeast Asian team against a West Asian host since 2004 (when Thailand beat Yemen 3–0 in Sana'a during the 2006 FIFA World Cup qualification), and was the first time in the history that a Southeast Asian team had won against a Persian Gulf team as the visitor. In the final match, Indonesia massively beat Nepal 7–0 at the Jaber Al-Ahmad International Stadium. Boosted by the win, Indonesia qualified for the upcoming 2023 AFC Asian Cup after a 16-year absence. Indonesia would be drawn with the top AFC rank team, Japan, Iraq, and Southeast Asia rival, Vietnam.

==== 2026 FIFA World Cup qualification ====
On 19 June 2023, Indonesia hosted 2022 FIFA World Cup champions, Argentina in preparation for the upcoming 2026 FIFA World Cup qualification. Indonesia massively played well holding the world's champion but a long strike from Leandro Paredes settled a 1–0 win right before halftime. In the second half, Cristian Romero scored a header to level it up to 2–0 for the Argentines.

Indonesia started the 2026 FIFA World Cup qualification from the first round, as they convincingly defeated Brunei in a 12–0 aggregates.

In the second round, Indonesia were put in a group with the same two teams that were drawn with Indonesia too in the upcoming AFC Asian Cup, Iraq, and two Southeast Asia rivals, Vietnam, and Philippines. Indonesia has a bad start in the second round, as they were heavily defeated 5–1 against Iraq in Basra, and a mere draw against Philippines in Manila in the next match.

==== 2023 AFC Asian Cup ====
Indonesia then started off 2024 playing two friendly matches against Libya at the Mardan Sports Complex in Turkey before flying off to Qatar for the last friendly match against Iran as the final preparation for the 2023 AFC Asian Cup tournament.

In the first match, Indonesia faced off against Iraq just after two months of facing each other, in a 1–3 loss. In the second match, Indonesia faced off against Southeast Asia rival Vietnam where captain, Asnawi Mangkualam converted a goal from the penalty spot to score the only goal in the match, it was the first time Indonesia defeated Vietnam after 7 years, as Indonesia gained 3 points. In the last group match, Indonesia lost 3–1 to the AFC top rank team, Japan.

Despite with two losses in the group stage, Indonesia qualified into Round of 16 by finishing as one of the four best third-place groups which was confirmed after another match in Group F between Kyrgyzstan and Oman ended in a draw. For the first time ever, Indonesia passed through to the knockout stage of the AFC Asian Cup since their first appearance in 1996 AFC Asian Cup. Indonesia faced against Australia in the Round of 16, but despite positive performance, the team's run ended with a 4–0 loss due to poor defending.

==== Advanced to the third round of the 2026 FIFA World Cup qualification ====
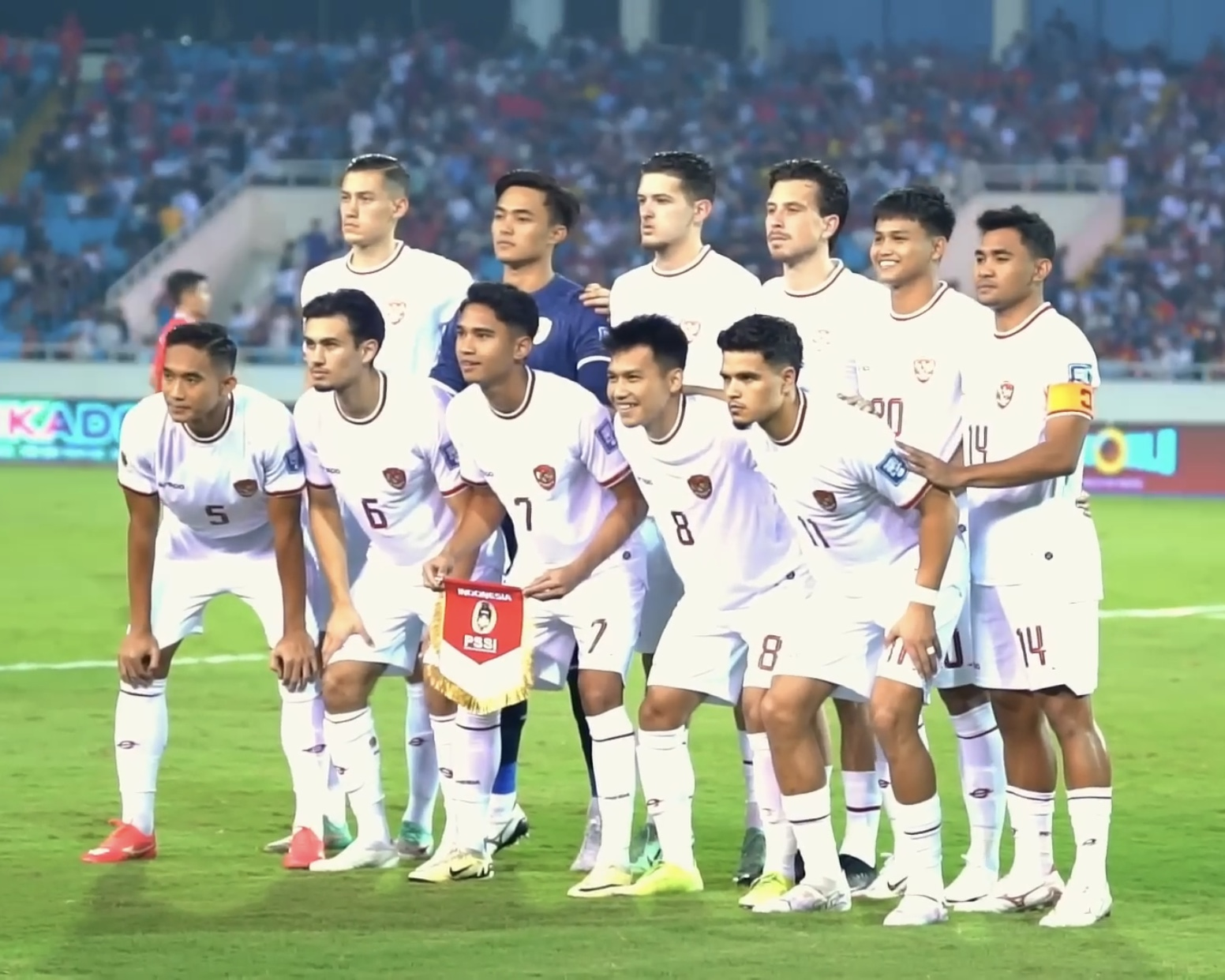
Indonesia line-up against Vietnam in the second round of 2026 FIFA World Cup qualification, 26 March 2024. Indonesia won 3–0

At the continuation of the 2026 FIFA World Cup qualification, Indonesia managed to beat Vietnam again twice on 21 & 26 March, in a 1–0 on Jakarta and 3–0 on Hanoi victories respectively, the latter would be the first time since 2004 that Indonesia defeated Vietnam in their own home ground. Thus Indonesia climbed up to the second place of the group with 7 points. The two victories also made Indonesia surpass ASEAN rivals, Philippines and Malaysia in the FIFA ranking, the latter would be the first time Indonesia placed above Malaysia in the FIFA ranking in 5 years.

On 25 April 2024, PSSI president Erick Thohir announced that Shin's contract is officially extended until 2027.

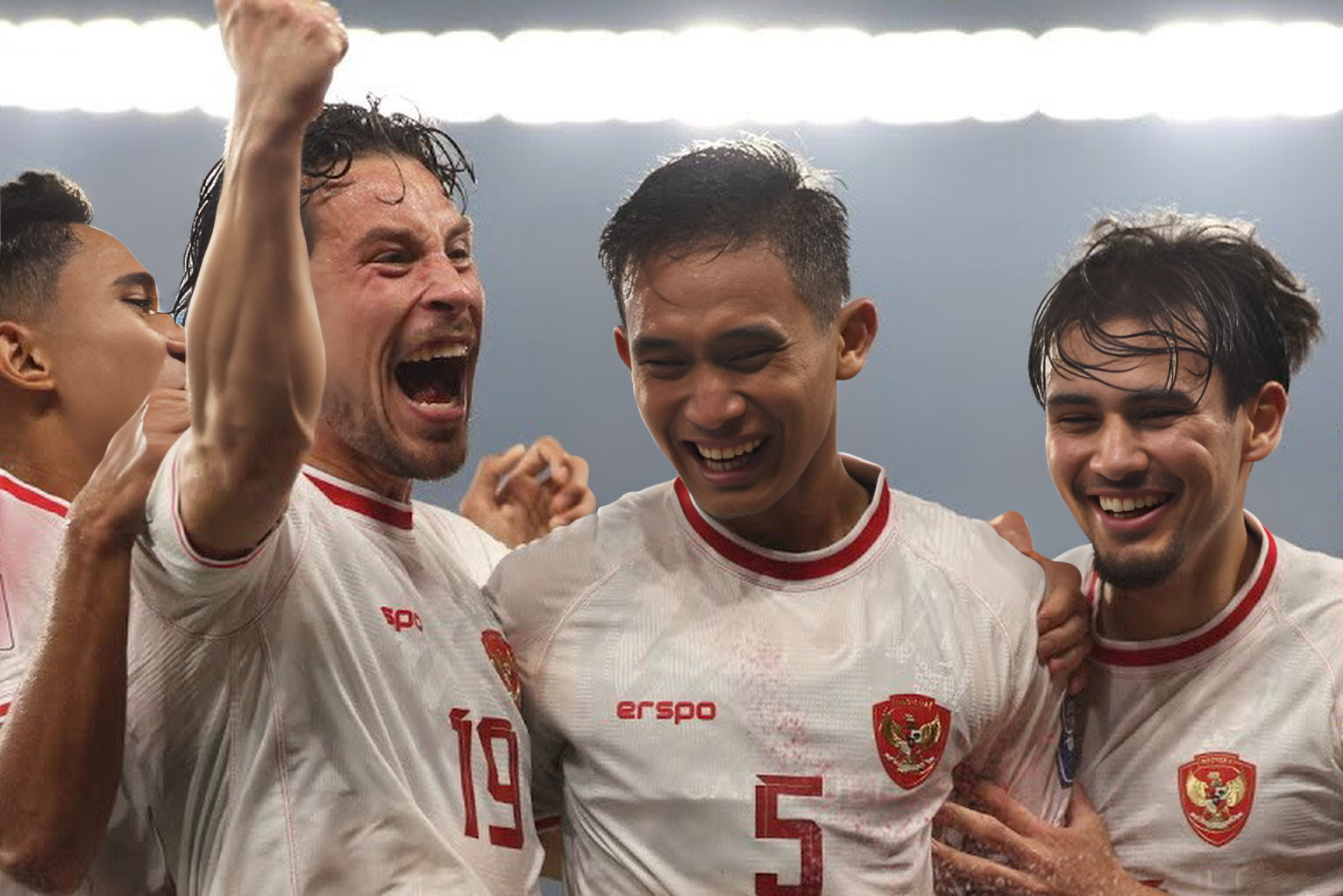
Indonesia's players celebrate a goal against the Philippines, 11 June 2024. Indonesia won 2–0

In June 2024, continuing the FIFA World Cup qualifiers second round last two matches at home, Indonesia lost 0–2 to Iraq once again. However, in the last match, Indonesia defeated the Philippines 2–0 at home. Indonesia would end up finishing as Group F runner-up, thus they qualified to the 2027 AFC Asian Cup and for the first time in history they advanced to the third round of World Cup qualification. In the third round, Indonesia were drawn into Group C which consisted of powerhouse like Japan, Australia, Saudi Arabia, China, and Bahrain. Indonesia started off their 2026 FIFA World Cup qualifiers in September 2024 where they draw 1–1 against Saudi Arabia in Jeddah and a goalless draw with Australia at home. In October 2024, Indonesia draw 2–2 with Bahrain in Riffa but however suffered a 2–1 defeat to China in Qingdao. In November 2024, Indonesia suffered a heavy 4–0 defeat to Japan at home. However, in the next match, Indonesia surprised the entire world with a shock as they defeated Saudi Arabia 2–0 with Marselino Ferdinan scoring a brace, thus breaking the record of Southeast Asian countries that have never beaten Saudi Arabia.

In November 2024, FIFA announced a number of disciplinary sanctions to Indonesia for various team and individual incidents.

==== 2024 ASEAN Championship ====
In the 2024 ASEAN Championship, Indonesia did not field their FIFA World Cup Qualification's main squad, with the majority of players fielded and called for Training Camp (TC) were from the U-16 and U-20 squads, with the addition of several veteran players who have played in 2023 AFC Asian Cup and the current 2026 World Cup Qualification. Indonesia is in Group B, of which contains Vietnam, Philippines, Myanmar, and Laos.

=== 2025: Patrick Kluivert's tenure ===
Following Shin Tae-yong's dismissal, on 8 January 2025, the PSSI officially appointed Patrick Kluivert as head coach, with Alex Pastoor and Denny Landzaat assisting him with a contract until 2027. In the continuation of third round World Cup qualifiers, Indonesia's first match under Kluivert ended in a 1–5 away loss to Australia, but they bounced back by defeating Bahrain 1–0 at home. On 5 June 2025, Indonesia managed to defeat China 1–0, their first win against the latter in 38 years. The win advanced Indonesia to the fourth round of World Cup qualification.

However, in the fourth round, Indonesia was beaten by Saudi Arabia 2–3 and Iraq 0–1, thus eliminating Indonesia from the World Cup contention. Following the elimination, widespread fan disappointment sparked calls for Kluivert’s immediate dismissal. The anger intensified after Kluivert and his assistants returned to the Netherlands without issuing an apology or accepting responsibility for the defeat. On 16 October 2025, PSSI decided to parted ways with Kluivert and the rest of the coaching staffs through a mutual agreement.

=== 2026: John Herdman's tenure ===
On 3 January 2026, PSSI officially appointed former Canada national team head coach John Herdman as the new head coach of the national team. At the time of Herdman’s appointment, Indonesia were ranked 122nd in the FIFA World Ranking.

Herdman made his debut in the 2026 FIFA Series, with a 4–0 win against Saint Kitts and Nevis. Indonesia finished runners up of the FIFA Series after a 0–1 defeat against Bulgaria in the following match.

During the June international window, Indonesia won 3–0 over Oman and 1–0 over Mozambique. The results helped Indonesia rise four places in the FIFA World Ranking, from 122nd to 118th. By the July 2026 ranking, Indonesia were the third-highest ranked Southeast Asian national team, behind Thailand, ranked 94th, and Vietnam, ranked 99th.

Indonesian starting line-up against Thailand at the final match of 2026 FIFA ASEAN Cup.

In the 2026 ASEAN Championship, Indonesia was placed in Group A, which contained Vietnam, Singapore, Cambodia, and Timor-Leste. Indonesia secured two victories but still did not advance past the group stage. This failure marked the second time in the Erick Thohir era.

In September and October, Indonesia competed in the inaugural FIFA ASEAN Cup of the 2026 edition. Indonesia were drawn alongside Malaysia, Singapore, and Bangladesh in Group A. They opened the tournament with a 2–0 victory over Singapore before drawing 0–0 with Malaysia despite playing with ten men from the 37th minute. On the final matchday of the group stage, Indonesia defeated Bangladesh 9–2, with Mitchell Baker scoring five goals. Indonesia and Malaysia both finished with seven points and a +9 goal difference, but Indonesia advanced to the final on goals scored after Kevin Diks and Baker scored in stoppage time.

In the final on 5 October, Indonesia faced Thailand. The match finished 2–2 after extra time before Indonesia won the penalty shoot-out 4–2, with goalkeeper Emil Audero saving Thailand’s fourth penalty. The victory made Indonesia the inaugural FIFA ASEAN Cup champions, and also marked their first title in the Southeast Asian level, or since the 1991 SEA Games if including medals.

During the opening match against Singapore, Indonesia made national history by fielding a starting lineup composed entirely of foreign-born players for the first time.

Also during the final against Thailand, Indonesia made Southeast Asian history by breaking the curse of the final where they lost since the establishment of the ASEAN Championship, or the 1997 SEA Games if including medals.

The success in the inaugural FIFA ASEAN Cup helped Indonesia rise from the 118th to 116th place in the FIFA World Ranking by October 2026.

== Women's team ==
The Indonesia women's national football team was established in 1975 by the Football Association of Indonesia (PSSI). Nevertheless, the team did not make its competitive debut until two years later, participating in the 1977 AFC Women's Championship, where they suffered a 0–5 defeat in their opening match against the Republic of China. Despite suffering a challenging loss in the first match of the tournament, Indonesia successfully progressed to the semifinals following a narrow 1–0 win over Japan in the second match. The sole goal of the game was netted by Lantang in the 20th minute, marking her as the first goal scorer for the Indonesian women's national team. At the conclusion of the tournament, Indonesia secured the fourth position, marking the highest achievement for the Indonesia women's national team in the Asian competition. This accomplishment was matched nine years later during the 1986 AFC Women's Championship.

Indonesia participated in the Asian Cup for the fourth time during the 1989 edition.The team was assigned to Group B, alongside Japan, Hong Kong, and Nepal. Despite being eliminated in the group stage, Indonesia achieved its largest victory in history by defeating Nepal 8–0 in this tournament on 22 December 1989, at Mong Kok Stadium in Hong Kong.

=== Modern era ===
In 2021, Indonesia secured a place in the 2022 AFC Women's Asian Cup for the first time since 1989, marking a 33-year absence. However, during the final tournament, Indonesia was unable to win any matches, failing to score a single goal. Notably, one of the losses was a staggering 0–18 against Australia, which stands as the nation's most significant defeat in history.

On 20 February 2024, PSSI appointed Satoru Mochizuki as the new head coach of the national team. Previously, Mochizuki held the position of assistant coach for the Japan women's national football team from 2008 to 2012, during which he contributed to the team's triumph in the 2011 FIFA Women's World Cup. Indonesia's first match with Mochizuki was in a friendly match against Singapore on 28 May 2024 that ends in a huge 5–1 victory for the Garuda Pertiwi.

Under Mochizuki, the team participated in the annual 2024 AFF Women's Cup, which also served as the qualification for the 2025 ASEAN Women's Championship, Indonesia managed to win their first maiden trophy in history, by beating Cambodia 3–1 in the final. Then in the 2026 AFF Women's Cup, which also served as the qualification for the 2027 ASEAN Women's Championship, Indonesia beat Laos 5–0 in the final to become the first team to win back-to-back titles in the AFF Women's Cup.

== Kit history ==
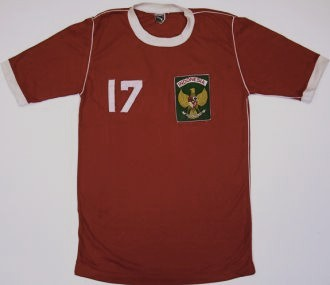
Indonesia's football jersey with number 17 in 1981

During the Dutch colonial era, the team competed as Dutch East Indies in international matches and played in an orange jersey, the national color of the Netherlands. There are no official documents about the team's kit, only several black-and-white photos from the match against Hungary in the 1938 FIFA World Cup; but unofficial documents stated that the kit consisted of an orange jersey, white shorts and light blue socks. Since Indonesia's independence, the kit consists of red and white, the colors of the country's flag. A combination of green and white has also been used for the away kits and was used for the team's participation in the 1956 Summer Olympics in Melbourne, Australia, until the mid-1980s.

Kelme is the national team's kit provider, a sponsorship that began in 2026 and is contracted to continue until at least 2030. Previously the team's kit was supplied by Nike, Mills and Erspo. Indonesia also wears other apparel, only when they compete in international sports events such as the Asian Games and the Southeast Asian Games. In those events Indonesia wears Li-Ning, this is due to the Asian Games and SEA Games being multi-sports events all of whose contingents are under the Indonesian National Olympic Committee (NOC).

Indonesia's current home kit, worn by Mitchell Baker during a press conference after a match against Bangladesh in 2026

From 2007 to 2019, Nike was the national team kit provider. The 2010–2012 home kit became an issue when the team played against an opponent wearing an all-white uniform since the socks were white instead of the usual red. The solution was solved with a red-green-green combination (for away games) with green shorts and socks taken from the away kit, or initially an all-red uniform (for home games). After a home defeat in the 2014 World Cup third round qualifier match against Bahrain on 6 September 2011, the red shorts (with green application) were scrapped after its first outing and has never been used again. The red socks had white application on them, different from the red socks with green application worn during training. The combination of red-white-red was used sometimes in the future as the alternate home kit, for example on the subsequent home matches of the qualifiers against Qatar and Iran later that year.

On 31 May 2018, Nike released Indonesia's new home and away kits. The home shirt was red with a golden Nike logo inspired by the country's national emblem, the Garuda Pancasila. The home kit consisted of a red-white-red combination. The away kit consisted of a white-green-white combination with a green Nike logo on the shirt.

In 2020, Indonesia started using new apparel from local brands Mills until 2024. The home kit consists of a red-white-red combination with a silhouette in the front of the kit. The away kit consists white-green-white combination with a green horizontal strip across the front of the kit and a smaller white horizontal strip across the green strip. The third kit consists all black combination with golden strips and a silhouette in the front of the kit.

=== Kit suppliers ===
| Kit supplier | Period | Notes |
|---|---|---|
| (Germany) Adidas | 1970–1995 | |
| (Japan) Asics | 1996 | |
| (Italy) Diadora | 1996–1997 | |
| (Germany) Uhlsport | 1997 | |
| (Japan) Mikasa | 1997 | |
| (Germany) Adidas | 1998–2000 | |
| (United States) Nike | 2000–2003 | |
| (Indonesia) Ghazali | 2004 | |
| (Germany) Adidas | 2004–2006 | |
| (United States) Nike | 2007–2019 | |
| (Indonesia) Mills | 2020–2024 | |
| (Indonesia) Erspo | 2024–2026 | |
| (Spain) Kelme | 2026– | |

=== Kit evolution ===
Throughout the history of the country's football jerseys, outfield players have worn home kits with the following color scheme:

| 1938 World Cup (as Dutch East Indies) | 1979–81 | 1981 | 1985 | 1991 | 1992 | 1993 | 1995 | 1996 Tiger Cup | 1996 Asian Cup |
| 1998–99 | 2000 | 2002 | 2002 (alternate) | 2004 Asian Cup | 2004 | 2004 (alternate) | 2004–06 | 2007 | 2007 (alternate 1) |
| 2007 (alternate 2) | 2007–08 | 2008–10 | 2008–10 (alternate) | 2010 | 2010–12 | 2010–12 (alternate 1) | 2010–12 (alternate 2) | 2010–12 (alternate 3) | 2012–14 |
| 2012–14 (alternate 1) | 2012–14 (alternate 2) | 2014–18 | 2014–18 (alternate) | 2018–19 | 2018–19 (alternate 1) | 2018–19 (alternate 2) | 2020–22 | 2022–24 | 2022–24 (alternate) |
| 2024–2025 | 2024–2025 (alternate) | 2025–2026 | 2025–2026 (alternate) | 2026–present |
