= 2026 FIFA ASEAN Cup final =

- Gelora Bung Karno Stadium before the match
- Event: 2026 FIFA ASEAN Cup
| Indonesia | Thailand |
| (Indonesia) | (Thailand) |
| 2 | 2 |
- After extra time Indonesia won 4–2 on penalties
- Date: 5 October 2026
- Venue: Gelora Bung Karno Stadium, Jakarta
- Man of the Match: Elkan Baggott (Indonesia)
- Referee: Akhrol Riskullaev (Uzbekistan)
- Attendance: 70,098
- Weather: Partly cloudy 30 °C (86 °F); 62% humidity

The 2026 FIFA ASEAN Cup final was a football match to determine the winners of the 2026 FIFA ASEAN Cup. It was played at the Gelora Bung Karno Stadium in Jakarta, Indonesia, on 5 October 2026, and was contested by Indonesia and Thailand, winners of the two groups. It was the inaugural final of the FIFA ASEAN Cup.

Indonesia won the final 4–2 on penalties after the match finished 2–2 following extra time, winning their first senior title since 1991. Dean James gave Indonesia the lead in the 84th minute before Iklas Sanron equalised three minutes later. Thailand then took the lead through Peeradol Chamrasamee in the 111th minute, but Elkan Baggott equalised five minutes later. In the penalty shoot-out, Indonesia scored all four of their attempts, while Thailand missed two, with goalkeeper Emil Audero saving Nattapong Sayriya's attempt.

== Background ==
Both were teams with the most appearances in the ASEAN Championship finals; Thailand was leading the all-time championship table with seven titles to their name. At the other hand, Indonesia had lost all six of their previous finals, two more than the second-worst, Thailand. They had met four times in the ASEAN Championship final, with Thailand winning in 2000, 2002, 2016 and 2020. In all competitions, Thailand had won 39 meetings between the sides, Indonesia had won 20, and 25 matches ended in draws—including those ended with penalties—prior to the final. Prior to the 2001 Southeast Asian Games, which saw age-group teams playing in place of senior teams ever since, both countries met in every edition of the games between 1977 and 1997. Among 12 matches, two were in the gold medal matches of 1991 and 1997, in which one side defeated the other on penalties.

The Gelora Bung Karno Stadium had staged two of the aforementioned finals, in 1997 and 2002; Thailand won both matches 4–2 on penalties.

== Route to the final ==
Indonesia finished first in Group A with seven points, ahead of Malaysia on goals scored after both teams finished unbeaten with seven points. Indonesia's final group match was a 9–2 victory over Bangladesh, with Mitchell Baker scoring five goals.

Thailand finished first in Group B with six points. They opened the tournament with a 4–0 victory over Pakistan and followed it with a 2–0 win over Vietnam, securing their place in the final with one match remaining. Thailand then lost 2–1 to the Philippines in their final group match after making several changes to their starting line-up.

| Indonesia | | Round | Thailand | |
|---|---|---|---|---|
| Opponent | Result | Group stage | Opponent | Result |
| Singapore | 2–0 | Matchday 1 | Pakistan | 4–0 |
| Malaysia | 0–0 | Matchday 2 | Vietnam | 2–0 |
| Bangladesh | 9–2 | Matchday 3 | Philippines | 1–2 |
| Group A winners: Pos / Team / Pld / Pts; 1 / Indonesia (H) / 3 / 7; 2 / Malaysia / 3 / 7; 3 / Singapore / 3 / 3; 4 / Bangladesh / 3 / 0; Source: FIFA (H) Hosts | | Final standings | Group B winners: Pos / Team / Pld / Pts; 1 / Thailand / 3 / 6; 2 / Vietnam / 3 / 6; 3 / Philippines / 3 / 4; 4 / Pakistan / 3 / 1; Source: FIFA | |

== Match details ==
La Grande Indonesia ultras in the stadium during the final

VIP dignitaries of the final, which included Prabowo Subianto, Erick Thohir and Gianni Infantino

The first half ended goalless, with Indonesia having more of the possession while Thailand looked to threaten on the counter-attack. Thailand lost Suphanan Bureerat to injury early in the second half before the match entered a dramatic final period.

Thailand were reduced to ten players when Nicholas Mickelson received a second yellow card in the 81st minute. Three minutes later, Indonesia took the lead when Dean James' free kick was deflected by substitute Iklas Sanron past goalkeeper Saranon Anuin. Thailand immediately responded, with Iklas volleying in a cross from Seksan Ratree in the 87th minute to make the score 1–1.

In extra time, Thailand took the lead in the 111th minute when Anan Yodsangwal won possession from Elkan Baggott and set up Peeradol Chamrasamee, who scored past Emil Audero. Baggott equalised in the 116th minute with a shot which went in off the underside of the crossbar, sending the match to a penalty shoot-out.

In the shoot-out, Kevin Diks, Dean James, Elkan Baggott and Shayne Pattynama scored for Indonesia. Manuel Bihr and Waris Choolthong scored for Thailand, while captain Sarach Yooyen hit the crossbar and Nattapong Sayriya had his attempt saved by Audero. Indonesia therefore won the shoot-out 4–2.

5 October 2026
20:00 UTC+7

| Indonesia | 2–2 (a.e.t.) | Thailand |
|---|---|---|
| James 84'; Baggott 116' | FIFA Report; GSA Report | Iklas 87'; Peeradol 111' |
Penalties
| Diks (penalty scored); James (penalty scored); Baggott (penalty scored); Pattynama (penalty scored) | 4–2 | (penalty scored) Bihr; (penalty scored) Waris; (penalty missed) Sarach; (penalty missed) Nattapong |

Gelora Bung Karno Stadium, Jakarta
Attendance: 70,098
Referee: Akhrol Riskullaev (Uzbekistan)

| Indonesia | Thailand |

| GK | 1 | Emil Audero |
| CB | 2 | Kevin Diks (c) |
| CB | 20 | Elkan Baggott |
| CB | 23 | Justin Hubner | (yellow card) 23' | (substituted off) 101' |
| CM | 14 | Joey Pelupessy |
| CM | 19 | Thom Haye | | (substituted off) 46' |
| RW | 8 | Luke Vickery | | (substituted off) 60' |
| AM | 10 | Ole Romeny | | (substituted off) 109' |
| AM | 11 | Ragnar Oratmangoen | | (substituted off) 65' |
| LW | 17 | Calvin Verdonk | | (substituted off) 101' |
| CF | 9 | Mitchell Baker |
Substitutions:
| DF | 21 | Dean James | (yellow card) 112' | (substituted on) 46' |
| DF | 5 | Rizky Ridho | (yellow card) 109' | (substituted on) 60' |
| MF | 18 | Ivar Jenner | | (substituted on) 65' |
| DF | 16 | Shayne Pattynama | | (substituted on) 101' |
| MF | 7 | Egy Maulana | | (substituted on) 101' |
| MF | 15 | Rayhan Hannan | | (substituted on) 109' |
Manager:
(England) John Herdman

| GK | 20 | Saranon Anuin |
| RB | 21 | Suphanan Bureerat | | (substituted off) 53' |
| CB | 2 | Nattapong Sayriya | (yellow card) 66' |
| CB | 4 | Manuel Bihr | (yellow card) 113' |
| LB | 12 | Nicholas Mickelson | (yellow card) 76' (yellow-red card) 81' |
| RM | 7 | Kakana Khamyok | | (substituted off) 79' |
| CM | 18 | Chanathip Songkrasin (c) | | (substituted off) 63' |
| CM | 6 | Sarach Yooyen |
| LM | 15 | Kritsada Kaman | | (substituted off) 91' |
| CF | 9 | Supachai Chaided | (yellow card) 40' | (substituted off) 79' |
| CF | 14 | Teerasak Poeiphimai | | (substituted off) 63' |
Substitutions:
| DF | 13 | Waris Choolthong | | (substituted on) 53' |
| MF | 22 | Seksan Ratree | | (substituted on) 63' |
| FW | 17 | Jude Soonsup-Bell | | (substituted on) 63' |
| FW | 11 | Anan Yodsangwal | | (substituted on) 79' |
| FW | 16 | Iklas Sanron | | (substituted on) 79' |
| MF | 8 | Peeradol Chamrasamee | | (substituted on) 91' |
Manager:
(England) Anthony Hudson

Man of the Match:
Elkan Baggott (Indonesia)

Assistant referees:
Sanjar Shayusupov (Uzbekistan)
Akmal Giyasov (Uzbekistan)
Fourth official:
Ibrokhim Ismoilov (Uzbekistan)
Reserve assistant referee:
Islom Azimov (Uzbekistan)
Video assistant referee:
Akobirxo'ja Shukurullayev (Uzbekistan)
Assistant video assistant referee:
Alisher Usmanov (Uzbekistan)

Match rules

- 90 minutes
- 30 minutes of extra time if necessary
- Penalty shoot-out if scores still level
- Maximum of twelve named substitutes
- Maximum of five substitutions, with a sixth allowed in extra time
- Maximum of three substitution opportunities, with a fourth allowed in extra time
- Maximum of one concussion substitution, granting the opposition an additional standalone substitution

== See also ==
- 2026 FIFA ASEAN Cup
- 2026 ASEAN Championship final
