= Emil Audero =

Indonesian footballer (born 1997)

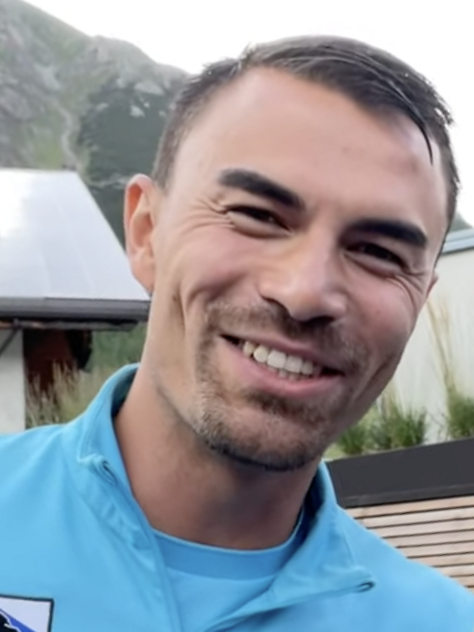
- Audero in 2023

Personal information
- Full name: Emilio Audero Mulyadi
- Date of birth: 18 January 1997 (age 29)
- Place of birth: Mataram, Indonesia
- Height: 1.92 m (6 ft 4 in)
- Position: Goalkeeper

Team information
- Current team: Rayo Vallecano (on loan from Como)
- Number: 25

Youth career
- 2008–2016: Juventus

Senior career*
Years	Team	Apps	(Gls)
2016–2019	Juventus	1	(0)
2017–2018	→ Venezia (loan)	38	(0)
2018–2019	→ Sampdoria (loan)	36	(0)
2019–2024	Sampdoria	127	(0)
2023–2024	→ Inter Milan (loan)	4	(0)
2024–	Como	8	(0)
2025	→ Palermo (loan)	15	(0)
2025–2026	→ Cremonese (loan)	34	(0)
2026–	→ Rayo Vallecano (loan)	8	(0)

International career^{‡}
2012	Italy U15	9	(0)
2012	Italy U16	1	(0)
2013	Italy U17	3	(0)
2013–2015	Italy U18	5	(0)
2015	Italy U19	3	(0)
2016–2017	Italy U20	4	(0)
2017–2019	Italy U21	10	(0)
2025–	Indonesia	8	(0)
Medal record
Men's football
Representing Indonesia
FIFA ASEAN Cup
Winner	2026 Indonesia	Team
FIFA Series
Runner-up	2026 Indonesia
Representing Italy
UEFA European Under-17 Championship
Runner-up	2013 Slovakia
- * Club domestic league appearances and goals as of 21 November 2026 ‡ National team caps and goals as of 14:50, 5 October 2026 (UTC)

Emilio Audero Mulyadi (born 18 January 1997) is an Indonesian professional footballer who plays as a goalkeeper for La Liga club Rayo Vallecano, on loan from Serie A club Como. A former Italian youth international, he plays for the Indonesia national team.

== Club career ==
=== Juventus ===
==== Youth ====
Audero joined the Juventus youth system in 2008, at age 11, after being noticed by Michelangelo Rampulla. With the Primavera (under-19) side, he reached the final of the 2015–16 Campionato Nazionale Primavera under manager Fabio Grosso, only to lose out 7–6 on penalties to Roma, following a 1–1 draw.

==== Senior ====
Audero was first called up to the Juventus first team by manager Massimiliano Allegri on 30 November 2014, but remained on the bench in Juventus's 2–1 home win over cross-city rivals Torino; he was called up to the bench five more times throughout the 2014–15 season.

The following season, he signed his first professional contract with the club once he turned 18, and was even included in the team's UEFA list; he was called up to the first team on 18 occasions in total, but once again failed to make an appearance for the club.

Following the departure of Rubinho in 2016, Audero was promoted to the club's third-choice goalkeeper behind Gianluigi Buffon and Neto for the 2016–17 season. After 61 call-ups in the league, he made his professional debut with Juventus on 27 May 2017, at the age of 20, in the final match of the 2016–17 Serie A, a 2–1 away victory over Bologna.

==== Loan to Venezia ====
On 8 July 2017, Audero joined Serie B club Venezia on loan.

=== Sampdoria ===
On 17 July 2018, Audero signed for Serie A club Sampdoria on loan until 30 June 2019 with an option to buy. On 26 February 2019, Sampdoria signed him on a permanent transfer in a deal worth €20 million. During his five-year stay at Sampdoria, Audero made 169 appearances in all competitions.

==== Loan to Inter Milan ====
On 10 August 2023, following Sampdoria's relegation to Serie B at the end of the previous season, Serie A club Inter Milan announced the signing of Audero on a season-long loan with a future option to make the move permanent.

On 29 November 2023, Audero made his debut for Inter Milan in the 2023–24 UEFA Champions League group stage against Benfica which ended in a 3–3 draw. Inter Milan then went on to win the scudetto this season, with Audero capping four appearances in the league.

=== Como ===
On 30 July 2024, newly promoted Serie A club Como announced the signing of Audero on a four-year contract.

==== Loan to Palermo ====
On 3 February 2025, Audero joined Serie B club Palermo on loan until the end of the 2024–25 season.

==== Loan to Cremonese ====
On 27 July 2025, Audero joined recently promoted Serie A club Cremonese on loan, with an option to buy. He made his debut in a 0–0 draw with Palermo in the Coppa Italia. Despite earning a clean sheet during regulation time, his side would go on to lose 5–4 in a penalty shoot-out. Audero made his league debut in the 2025–26 season with an outstanding 2–1 win against AC Milan at San Siro. He made four saves to secure the team's victory.

On 1 February 2026, during Cremonese's 2–0 home defeat to Audero's former employers Inter Milan, an Inter fan threw a firework at the goalkeeper and it exploded just behind him. Despite a burn and cut on his leg, Audero was able to continue the match. He later put out a video message: "[I] feel relieved, because having seen the footage, it could’ve really been a lot worse. I’m glad that it went well, despite it all." By the end of the 2025–26 season, Emil Audero recorded the highest number of saves among Serie A goalkeepers, with a total of 125.

==== Loan to Rayo Vallecano ====
On 2 September 2026, Audero was loaned to La Liga club Rayo Vallecano. On 12 September, he made his debut against Real Madrid in a 4–1 loss, making seven saves, including blocking a Kylian Mbappe close-range shot and tipping over a bouncing header from Denzel Dumfries. He became the first Indonesian to play in La Liga.

== International career ==
Audero with Indonesia in 2025

As he was born in Indonesia to an Indonesian father and an Italian mother, Audero was eligible to play for both the Italy and Indonesia senior national teams. Audero represented Italy at all youth levels, from the under-15 to the under-21. With the Italy U17 team, he took part in the 2013 UEFA European Under-17 Championship.

He was left out of the Italy under-20 squad for the 2017 FIFA U-20 World Cup in South Korea as Juventus wanted him to remain eligible to play for the club.

On 4 September 2017, he made his debut with the Italy U21 team under Luigi Di Biagio in a 4–1 friendly victory against Slovenia in Cittadella.

In February 2025, it was announced that Audero had decided to represent Indonesia at international level. On 9 March, he was called up for the first time to the Indonesia national team for 2026 FIFA World Cup qualifying matches against Australia and Bahrain. On 5 June 2025, he made his debut with Indonesia, keeping a clean sheet in a 1–0 win against China.

On 5 October 2026, in the 2026 FIFA ASEAN Cup final facing Thailand. The match finished 2–2 after extra time before Indonesia won the penalty shoot-out 4–2, with Audero saving Thailand's fourth penalty. The victory made Indonesia the inaugural FIFA ASEAN Cup champions.

== Style of play ==
As a tall goalkeeper, Audero possesses a good physique, and is known for his determination, reflexes, and shot-stopping ability between the posts, as well as his speed when rushing off his line and ability to get to ground and collect the ball, which enables his team to keep a high defensive line and inspire a sense of confidence in his back-line; he is less adept with his feet however.

Considered to be a talented young player in the media, in 2019 UEFA included him in their list of the most promising European players of his generation.

== Personal life ==
Audero was born in Mataram, Indonesia to an Indonesian father, Edy Mulyadi and Italian mother, Antonella Audero. He moved with his family to his mother's hometown in Cumiana in 1998.

Audero had dual nationality, as both countries adhere to the principle of jus sanguinis. However, he lost his Indonesian nationality at the age of 21, after not declaring according to Indonesian nationality law. On 10 March 2025, Audero officially reacquired his Indonesian citizenship, thereby renouncing his Italian citizenship.

== Career statistics ==
=== Club ===
As of match played 21 November 2026

Appearances and goals by club, season and competition
Club	Season	League			Coppa Italia		Europe		Other		Total	
Club	Season	Division	Apps	Goals	Apps	Goals	Apps	Goals	Apps	Goals	Apps	Goals
Juventus	2016–17	Serie A	1	0	0	0	0	0	0	0	1	0
Venezia (loan)	2017–18	Serie B	38	0	1	0	—		3 (Note: Appearances in Serie A promotion play-offs)	0	42	0
Sampdoria (loan)	2018–19	Serie A	36	0	1	0	—		—		37	0
Sampdoria	2019–20	Serie A	36	0	2	0	—		—		38	0
Sampdoria	2020–21	Serie A	37	0	1	0	—		—		38	0
Sampdoria	2021–22	Serie A	29	0	1	0	—		—		30	0
Sampdoria	2022–23	Serie A	25	0	1	0	—		—		26	0
Sampdoria	Total		163	0	6	0	—		—		169	0
Inter Milan (loan)	2023–24	Serie A	4	0	1	0	1 (Note: Appearance in UEFA Champions League)	0	0	0	6	0
Como	2024–25	Serie A	8	0	0	0	—		—		8	0
Palermo (loan)	2024–25	Serie B	15	0	0	0	—		1	0	16	0
Cremonese (loan)	2025–26	Serie A	34	0	1	0	—		—		35	0
Rayo Vallecano (loan)	2026–27	La Liga	8	0	0	0	—		—		8	0
Career total			268	0	9	0	1	0	4	0	284	0

=== International ===
As of match played 5 October 2026

Appearances and goals by national team and year
National team	Year	Apps	Goals
Indonesia	2025	4	0
Indonesia	2026	4	0
Indonesia	Total	8	0

== Honours ==
Juventus

- Serie A: 2015–16, 2016–17
- Coppa Italia: 2015–16, 2016–17
- UEFA Champions League runner-up: 2016–17

Inter Milan

- Serie A: 2023–24
- Supercoppa Italiana: 2023

Italy U17

- UEFA European Under-17 Championship runner-up: 2013

Indonesia

- FIFA ASEAN Cup: 2026

Individual

- PSSI Awards Save of the Year: 2026
- La Liga Save of the Month: October 2026
