= Mitch Baker =

Mitch Baker may refer to:

- Mitch Baker (Grand Theft Auto), fictional character from the video game Grand Theft Auto
- Mitch Baker (EastEnders), fictional character in EastEnders

== See also ==
- Mitchell Baker (born 1957), chairperson of the Mozilla Foundation
- Mitchell Baker (footballer)
