= Ole Romeny =

Indonesian footballer (born 2000)

- Romeny with Indonesia in 2025

Personal information
- Full name: Ole Lennard ter Haar Romenij
- Date of birth: 20 June 2000 (age 26)
- Place of birth: Nijmegen, Netherlands
- Height: 1.85 m (6 ft 1 in)
- Position: Forward

Team information
- Current team: Fortuna Sittard (on loan from Oxford United)
- Number: 10

Youth career
- 2005–2011: DVOL
- 2011–2018: NEC

Senior career*
Years	Team	Apps	(Gls)
2018–2022	NEC	69	(9)
2020–2021	→ Willem II (loan)	11	(0)
2022–2023	Emmen	45	(13)
2023–2025	Utrecht	29	(3)
2025–	Oxford United	30	(1)
2026–	→ Fortuna Sittard (loan)	6	(1)

International career^{‡}
2014	Netherlands U15	1	(0)
2018	Netherlands U18	1	(0)
2018–2019	Netherlands U19	5	(1)
2019	Netherlands U20	2	(0)
2025–	Indonesia	14	(7)
Medal record
Men's football
Representing Indonesia
FIFA ASEAN Cup
Winner	2026 Indonesia	Team
FIFA Series
Runner-up	2026 Indonesia
- * Club domestic league appearances and goals as of 25 October 2026 ‡ National team caps and goals as of 15:05, 5 October 2026 (UTC)

Ole Lennard ter Haar Romenij (born 20 June 2000), commonly known as Ole Romeny, is a professional footballer who plays as a forward for Eredivisie club Fortuna Sittard, on loan from EFL League One club Oxford United. Born in the Netherlands, he plays for the Indonesia national team.

== Club career ==
=== NEC ===
Romeny started playing football at age 8 at DVOL in Lent before moving to the youth academy of NEC Nijmegen. In the winter of 2018, he was promoted to the first-team. Under new coach Pepijn Lijnders, he became a regular part of the squad. On 19 January 2018, he made his debut in a 2–3 away defeat to Almere City, replacing his childhood friend Ferdi Kadıoğlu in the 84th minute. In injury time, he had to leave the field after being sent off by referee Kevin Blom. With that, he became the youngest player ever in the Eerste Divisie to receive a red card in his debut. The card was later dismissed after NEC filed a complaint and won the appeal.

==== Loan to Willem II ====
On 30 September 2020, Romeny signed for Eredivisie club Willem II on a season-long loan, with the option of a permanent transfer.

=== Emmen ===
On 27 January 2022, Romeny signed with Emmen for a 1.5-year term.

=== Utrecht ===
On 13 June 2023, Romeny joined Utrecht on a three-season deal.

=== Oxford United ===
On 5 January 2025, Romeny signed for EFL Championship side Oxford United on a long-term contract for an undisclosed fee. On 1 March 2025, Romeny scored his first goal for the team against Coventry City in a 2–3 loss.

==== Loan to Fortuna Sittard ====
On 11 July 2026, Romeny officially joined Eredivisie club Fortuna Sittard, with the option of a permanent transfer. He scored on his Fortuna Sittard debut, the first goal in a 2–2 draw with PSV Eindhoven.

== International career ==
Romeny played one international match for the Netherlands national under-15 and under-18 teams.

Romeny prepares to take a penalty kick for Indonesia during the 2026 FIFA World Cup qualification match against China in 2025.

In November 2024, Romeny confirmed that he had decided to represent Indonesia at international level. On 20 February 2025, the change of his association was approved by FIFA, becoming cap-tied to Indonesia in the process. On 9 March 2025, Romeny received his first call-up from the Indonesia senior side for the 2026 FIFA World Cup qualification matches against Australia and Bahrain. On 20 March 2025, he made his debut against Australia and scored his debut goal for the national team. Five days later, on 25 March 2025, Romeny scored the lone goal in a 1–0 win against Bahrain and was selected as the man of the match.

On 5 June 2025, Romeny scored the lone goal again from the penalty spot in a 1–0 win against China and once again was selected as man of the match for the second game in a row. On 25 September 2026, in a Division 1 match in the 2026 FIFA ASEAN Cup, he scored a 75th-minute penalty to secure a 2–0 victory over Singapore.

== Personal life ==
Romeny was born and raised in the Netherlands. His maternal grandmother, who was ethnically Dutch, was born in Medan, North Sumatra, when it was called the Dutch East Indies. Romeny is therefore eligible to represent Indonesia at international level.

On 8 February 2025, Romeny officially obtained Indonesian citizenship.

== Career statistics ==
=== Club ===
As of match played 25 October 2026

Appearances and goals by club, season and competition
Club	Season	League			National cup (Note: Includes KNVB Cup, FA Cup)		Other		Total	
Club	Season	Division	Apps	Goals	Apps	Goals	Apps	Goals	Apps	Goals
NEC	2017–18	Eerste Divisie	4	0	—		2 (Note: Appearances in Promotion/Relegation Play Offs)	1	6	1
NEC	2018–19	Eerste Divisie	23	1	1	0	1	0	25	1
NEC	2019–20	Eerste Divisie	27	8	1	0	—		28	8
NEC	2020–21	Eerste Divisie	5	0	0	0	—		5	0
NEC	2021–22	Eredivisie	10	0	3	2	—		13	2
NEC	Total		69	9	5	2	—		77	12
Willem II (loan)	2020–21	Eredivisie	11	0	0	0	—		11	0
Emmen	2021–22	Eerste Divisie	12	2	0	0	—		12	2
Emmen	2022–23	Eredivisie	33	11	2	0	4	1	39	12
Emmen	Total		45	13	2	0	—		51	14
Utrecht	2023–24	Eredivisie	16	1	2	0	—		18	1
Utrecht	2024–25	Eredivisie	13	2	1	0	—		14	2
Utrecht	Total		29	3	3	0	—		32	3
Oxford United	2024–25	Championship	14	1	0	0	—		14	1
Oxford United	2025–26	Championship	16	0	2	0	—		18	0
Oxford United	Total		30	1	2	0	—		32	1
Fortuna Sittard (loan)	2026–27	Eredivisie	6	1	0	0	—		6	1
Career total			190	27	12	2	7	2	209	31

=== International ===
As of match played 5 October 2026

Appearances and goals by national team and year
National team	Year	Apps	Goals
Indonesia
Indonesia	2025	6	3
Indonesia	2026	8	4
Total		14	7

As of match played 25 September 2026
Scores and results list Indonesia's goal tally first, score column indicates score after each Romeny goal.

Table key
‡	Indicates goal was scored from a penalty kick

List of international goals scored by Ole Romeny
No.	Date	Venue	Cap	Opponent	Score	Result	Competition
1	20 March 2025	Sydney Football Stadium, Sydney, Australia	1	Australia	1–4	1–5	2026 FIFA World Cup qualification
2	25 March 2025	Gelora Bung Karno Stadium, Jakarta, Indonesia	2	Bahrain	1–0	1–0	2026 FIFA World Cup qualification
3	5 June 2025	Gelora Bung Karno Stadium, Jakarta, Indonesia	3	China	1–0‡	1–0	2026 FIFA World Cup qualification
4	27 March 2026	Gelora Bung Karno Stadium, Jakarta, Indonesia	7	Saint Kitts and Nevis	3–0	4–0	2026 FIFA Series
5	5 June 2026	Gelora Bung Karno Stadium, Jakarta, Indonesia	9	Oman	2–0	3–0	Garuda Championship Series
6	9 June 2026	Gelora Bung Karno Stadium, Jakarta, Indonesia	10	Mozambique	1–0	1–0	Garuda Championship Series
7	25 September 2026	Gelora Bung Karno Stadium, Jakarta, Indonesia	11	Singapore	2–0‡	2–0	2026 FIFA ASEAN Cup

== Honours ==
Emmen

- Eerste Divisie: 2021–22

Indonesia

- FIFA ASEAN Cup: 2026
- FIFA Series runner-up: 2026

== See also ==
- List of Indonesia international footballers born outside Indonesia
