= Iklas Sanron =

Thai footballer

Personal information
- Full name: Iklas Sanron
- Date of birth: 16 December 2004 (age 21)
- Place of birth: Songkhla, Thailand
- Height: 1.78 m (5 ft 10 in)
- Positions: Winger; forward

Team information
- Current team: Buriram United
- Number: 21

Youth career
- 2020–2022: Debsirin School

Senior career*
Years	Team	Apps	(Gls)
2022–2024	Chamchuri United	26	(4)
2024–2026	PT Prachuap	33	(2)
2026–	Buriram United	0	(0)

International career
2025–2026	Thailand U23	5	(2)
2026–	Thailand	3	(2)
Medal record
Men's football
Representing Thailand
FIFA ASEAN Cup
Runner-up	2026 Indonesia	Team
- * Club domestic league appearances and goals

Iklas Sanron (Thai: อิคลาศ สันหรน; born 16 December 2004) is a Thai professional footballer who plays as a winger for Thai League 1 club Buriram United and the Thailand national team.

== Early life ==
Iklas is a Muslim of Malay descent from Songkhla province. He has a younger brother, Saffan Sanron, who also plays professional football.

== Club career ==
Iklas Sanron learned to play football in the school team of Debsirin School in Bangkok.

He signed his first contract at the beginning of January 2023 with Thai League 3 club, Chamchuri United.

In July 2024, he transferred to Thai League 1 club, PT Prachuap.

== International career ==
=== Youth ===
In September 2025, he was called up to Thailand U23 squad for the 2026 AFC U-23 Asian Cup qualification.

=== Senior ===
Iklas received his first call-up to the Thailand national team in November 2025, but did not make an appearance. In September 2026, Iklas was called up for the 2026 FIFA ASEAN Cup. On 2 October 2026, he scored his first goal in a 1–2 defeat to Philippines.

=== International goals ===
Scores and results list Thailand's goal tally first.

No.	Date	Venue	Opponent	Score	Result	Competition
1.	2 October 2026	Si Jalak Harupat Stadium, Bandung, Indonesia	Philippines	1–1	1–2	2026 FIFA ASEAN Cup
2.	5 October 2026	Gelora Bung Karno Stadium, Jakarta, Indonesia	Indonesia	1–1	2–2 (a.e.t.) (2–4 p)	2026 FIFA ASEAN Cup

== Honours ==
Thailand

- FIFA ASEAN Cup runner-up: 2026
- King's Cup: 2026
