= Rizky Ridho =

Indonesian footballer (born 2001)

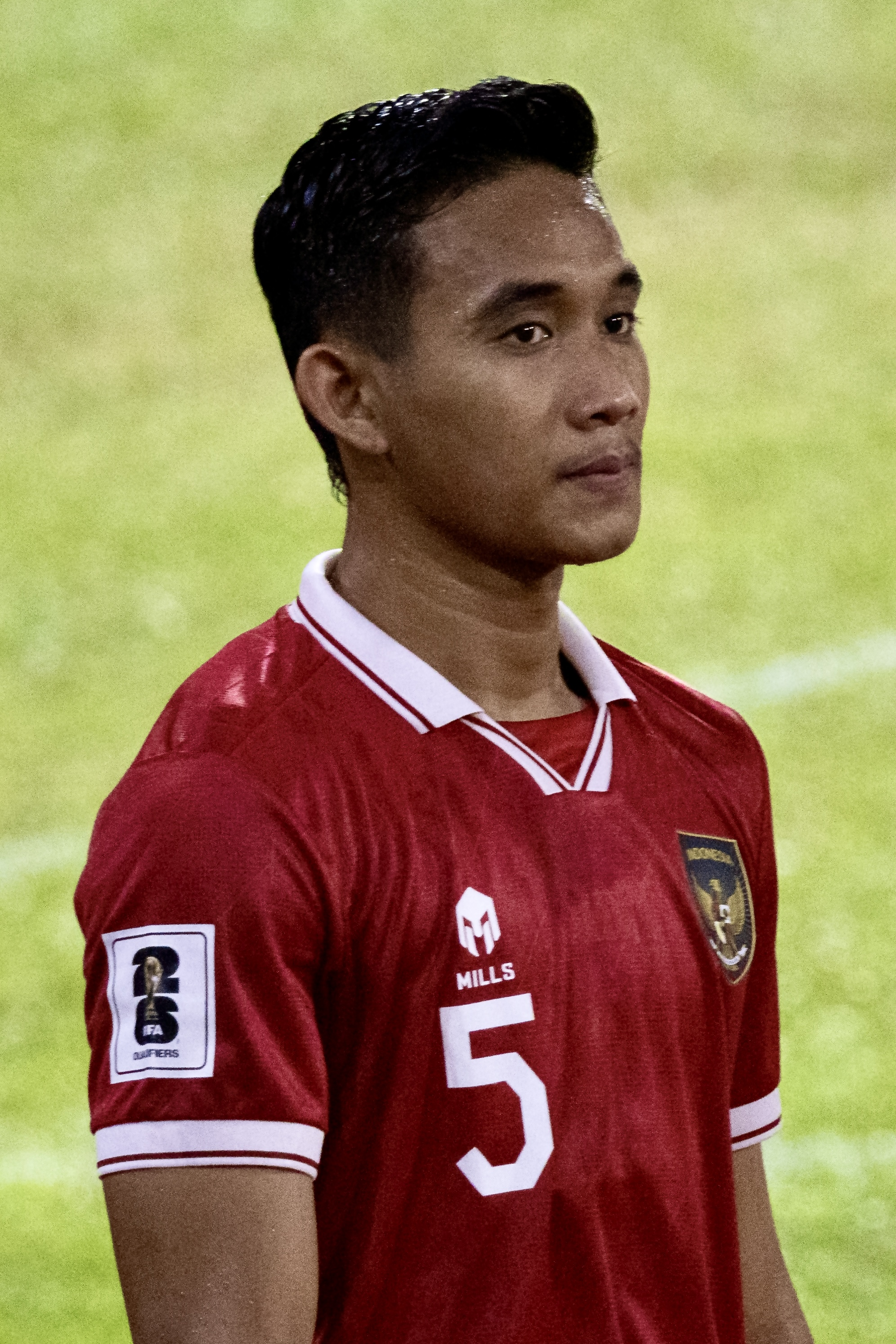
- Ridho playing for Indonesia in 2023

Personal information
- Full name: Rizky Ridho Ramadhani
- Date of birth: 21 November 2001 (age 25)
- Place of birth: Surabaya, Indonesia
- Height: 1.82 m (6 ft 0 in)
- Position: Centre-back

Team information
- Current team: Persija Jakarta
- Number: 5

Youth career
- SSB Simo Putra
- 2017: Persikoba Batu
- 2018–2019: Persebaya Surabaya

Senior career*
Years	Team	Apps	(Gls)
2020–2023	Persebaya Surabaya	38	(3)
2023–	Persija Jakarta	96	(4)

International career^{‡}
2019–2020	Indonesia U19	12	(2)
2021–2024	Indonesia U23	30	(2)
2021–	Indonesia	61	(5)
Medal record
Men's football
Representing Indonesia
FIFA ASEAN Cup
Winner	2026 Indonesia	Team
FIFA Series
Runner-up	2026 Indonesia
AFF Championship
Runner-up	2020 Singapore	Team
AFF U-19 Youth Championship
Third place	2019 Vietnam
Southeast Asian Games
Gold medal – first place	2023 Cambodia	Team
Bronze medal – third place	2021 Vietnam	Team
- * Club domestic league appearances and goals as of 22 November 2026 ‡ National team caps and goals as of 5 October 2026

Rizky Ridho Ramadhani (born 21 November 2001) is an Indonesian professional footballer who plays as a centre-back for Super League club Persija Jakarta and the Indonesia national team.

== Club career ==
=== Persebaya Surabaya ===
Since 2018 to 2019, Rizky Ridho is a player from the Persebaya academy, he joined the Persebaya U20 squad that competed in the 2019 Liga 1 U-20. As a result, he became a core player in the team that won the event under coach Uston Nawawi. Following his impressive performance, he was promoted to the senior team in 2020. He made his Persebaya debut in a friendly match against Persis Solo at Gelora Bung Tomo Stadium on 11 January 2020. Rizky Ridho made his league debut for Persebaya Surabaya on 13 March 2020 as a starter in a match against Persipura Jayapura in the 2020 Liga 1 competition that ended after three matches due to the COVID-19 pandemic.

On 4 September 2021, Rizky Ridho started his match in the 2021–22 season for Persebaya Surabaya in a 3–1 loss over Borneo Samarinda, he playing as a starter and played the full 90 minutes. Since joining the club from 2019, he became a first team regular for the side, playing mostly in the centre–back position, by the end of the 2021–22 season, Rizky Ridho had made 18 appearances and without scored in the league.

Ahead of the 2022–23 season, Rizky Ridho was linked with a move to several Thai League 1 side, but he eventually stayed at the club. Despite this, Rizky Ridho became a regular starter for Persebaya under coach Aji Santoso, and saw an improvement in his performances for the side in the number of matches. On 1 August 2022, Rizky Ridho scored his first league goal for Persebaya in a 2–0 home victory to Persita Tangerang, in which he scored a free header from a corner.

On 18 January 2023, Rizky Ridho scored from a free-kick in a 0–5 away win against Persita Tangerang at Indomilk Arena. Five days later, Rizky Ridho scored an equalizer towards the end of the first half in the 41st minute, and until the end of the match, the score was 2-1 for Persebaya's victory over Bhayangkara at Gelora Joko Samudro Stadium.

=== Persija Jakarta ===
On 1 July 2023, Rizky Ridho moved to Persija Jakarta on a three-year contract until 2026. He made his debut for the club in a league match on 3 July 2023 against PSM Makassar, playing the entire match. On 9 August 2023, he scored his first goal for the club against Borneo Samarinda in a 1–1 draw..

Andritany Ardhiyasa and the club announced Ridho's appointment as Persija's new captain for the 2024–25 season alongside Muhammad Ferarri as vice captain right before the season started.

== International career ==
Rizky Ridho debuted for the Indonesia U19 team in the 2019 AFF U-19 Youth Championship and captained the U-19 squad when it faced Bulgaria U19 in a friendly on 5 September 2020. He was chosen as the captain for the Indonesia U23 during the 2024 AFC U-23 Asian Cup held in Qatar.

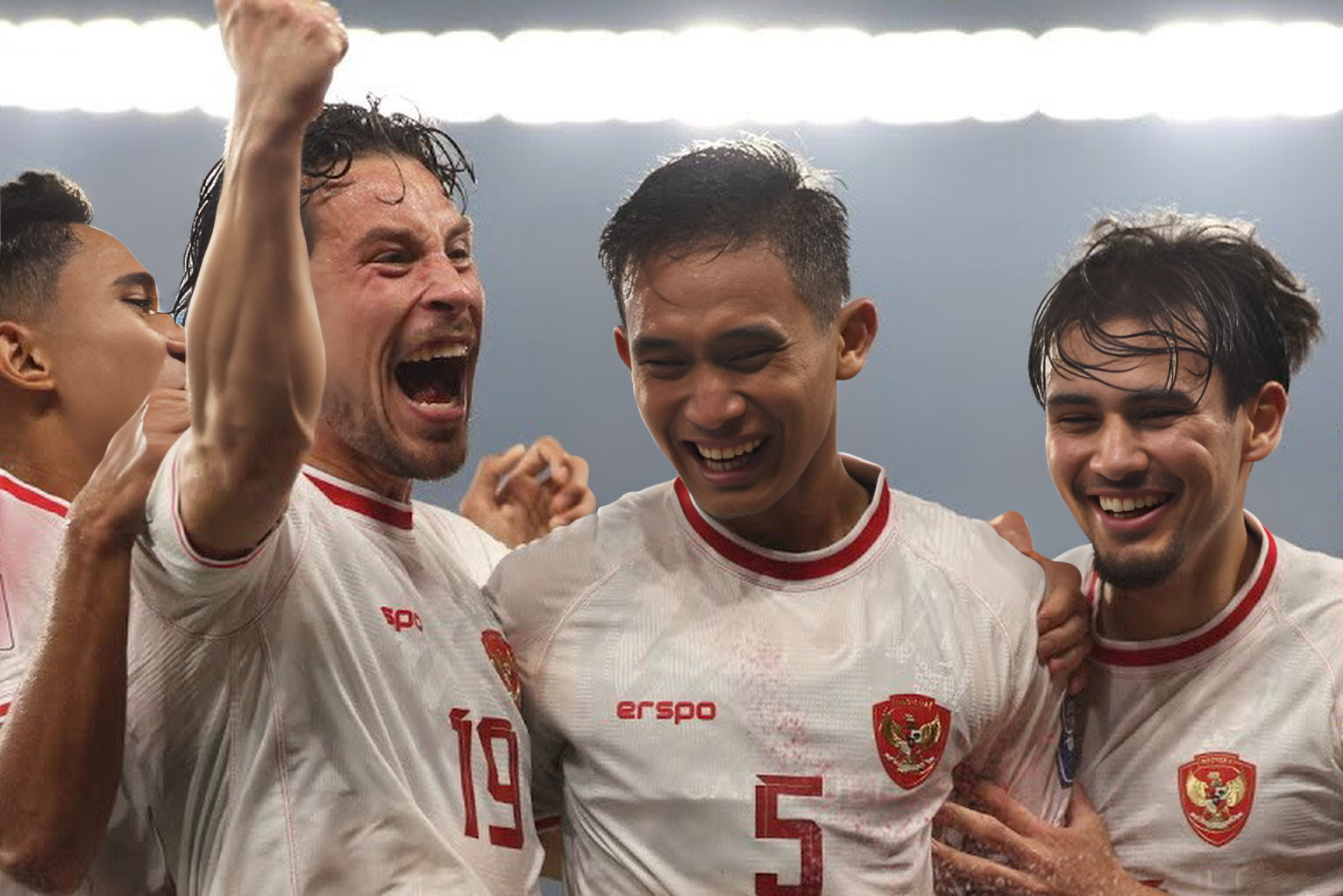
Ridho (center) celebrates his goal for Indonesia during a match against the Philippines in 2024

Rizky Ridho received a call to join the senior Indonesia national team in May 2021. He earned his first cap in a friendly match against Oman on 29 May 2021.

Ridho became the youngest centre-back to make an appearance at the FIFA World Cup qualification for the Indonesia national team since the 1986 FIFA World Cup qualification. He appeared against Thailand on 3 June 2021 at the age of 19 years, 7 months and 10 days.

On 25 March 2023, Ridho scored his first goal for Indonesia, against Burundi in a friendly match.

On 12 October 2023, Ridho scored a goal against Brunei in the 2026 FIFA World Cup qualifiers. Ridho scored again against the same opponent in the second leg.

== Career statistics ==
=== Club ===
As of 16 May 2026

Club	Season	League			Cup		League Cup		Continental		Other (Note: Appearances in Indonesia President's Cup)		Total	
Club	Season	Division	Apps	Goals	Apps	Goals	Apps	Goals	Apps	Goals	Apps	Goals	Apps	Goals
Persebaya Surabaya	2020	Liga 1	1	0	0	0			—		0	0	1	0
Persebaya Surabaya	2021–22	Liga 1	18	0	0	0			—		4 (Note: Appearances in Menpora Cup)	0	22	0
Persebaya Surabaya	2022–23	Liga 1	19	3	0	0			—		0	0	19	3
Persebaya Surabaya	Total		38	3	0	0			0	0	5	0	43	3
Persija Jakarta	2023–24	Liga 1	24	1	0	0			—		0	0	24	1
Persija Jakarta	2024–25	Liga 1	32	1	0	0			—		3	0	35	1
Persija Jakarta	2025–26	Super League	31	1	0	0			—		0	0	31	1
Persija Jakarta	2026–27	Super League	9	1	0	0	0	0	—		0	0	9	1
Total			96	4	0	0	0	0	0	0	3	0	99	4
Career total			134	7	0	0	0	0	0	0	8	0	144	7

=== International ===
As of match played 5 October 2026

Appearances and goals by national team and year
National team	Year	Apps	Goals
Indonesia	2021	9	0
Indonesia	2022	7	0
Indonesia	2023	11	3
Indonesia	2024	18	1
Indonesia	2025	5	0
Indonesia	2026	11	1
Total		61	5

As of match played 1 October 2026
Indonesia score listed first; the score column indicates the score after each Ridho goal

List of international goals scored by Rizky Ridho
No.	Date	Venue	Cap	Opponent	Score	Result	Competition
1	25 March 2023	Patriot Chandrabhaga Stadium, Bekasi, Indonesia	20	Burundi	3–0	3–1	Friendly
2	12 October 2023	Gelora Bung Karno Stadium, Jakarta, Indonesia	24	Brunei	2–0	6–0	2026 FIFA World Cup qualification
3	17 October 2023	Hassanal Bolkiah National Stadium, Bandar Seri Begawan, Brunei	25	Brunei	5–0	6–0	2026 FIFA World Cup qualification
4	11 June 2024	Gelora Bung Karno Stadium, Jakarta, Indonesia	39	Philippines	2–0	2–0	2026 FIFA World Cup qualification
5	1 October 2026	Gelora Bung Karno Stadium, Jakarta, Indonesia	60	Bangladesh	3–0	9–2	2026 FIFA ASEAN Cup

== Honours ==
Persebaya Surabaya U20

- Elite Pro Academy U-20: 2019

Persebaya Surabaya

- East Java Governor Cup: 2020

Indonesia U19

- AFF U-19 Youth Championship third place: 2019

Indonesia U23

- SEA Games gold medal: 2023; bronze medal: 2021

Indonesia

- FIFA ASEAN Cup: 2026
- AFF Championship runner-up: 2020

Individual

- Liga 1 Young Player of the Month: July 2023
- Liga 1 Best Goal: 2024–25
- Liga 1 Team of the Season: 2024–25
- APPI Indonesian Football Award Best Defender: 2024–25
- APPI Indonesian Football Award Best 11: 2024–25
- APPI Indonesian Football Award Best Goal: 2024–25
- FIFA Puskás Award: 2025 nominee
- PSSI Awards Goal of the Year: 2026
