= Elkan Baggott =

Indonesian footballer (born 2002)

- Baggott with Indonesia in 2026

Personal information
- Full name: Elkan William Tio Baggott
- Date of birth: 23 October 2002 (age 24)
- Place of birth: Bangkok, Thailand
- Height: 1.96 m (6 ft 5 in)
- Position: Centre-back

Team information
- Current team: Millwall
- Number: 12

Youth career
- 2016–2022: Ipswich Town

Senior career*
Years	Team	Apps	(Gls)
2020–2026	Ipswich Town	2	(0)
2021	→ King's Lynn Town (loan)	7	(0)
2022–2023	→ Gillingham (loan)	19	(2)
2023	→ Cheltenham Town (loan)	1	(0)
2024	→ Bristol Rovers (loan)	14	(1)
2024–2025	→ Blackpool (loan)	18	(0)
2026–	Millwall	6	(0)

International career^{‡}
2020	Indonesia U19	2	(0)
2023	Indonesia U23	2	(1)
2021–	Indonesia	32	(3)
Medal record
Men's football
Representing Indonesia
FIFA ASEAN Cup
Winner	2026 Indonesia	Team
FIFA Series
Runner-up	2026 Indonesia
AFF Championship
Runner-up	2020 Singapore	Team
Southeast Asian Games
Bronze medal – third place	2021 Vietnam	Team
- * Club domestic league appearances and goals as of 19 September 2026 ‡ National team caps and goals as of 5 October 2026

Elkan William Tio Baggott (born 23 October 2002) is a professional footballer who plays as a centre-back for EFL Championship club Millwall. Born in Thailand, he plays for the Indonesia national team.

== Early life ==
Elkan William Tio Baggott was born on 23 October 2002 in Bangkok, Thailand, to an Indonesian mother and an English father. He learned to play football at the Soccer Schools International (SSI), Jakarta. The organisation was primarily funded by Arsenal and run by Max Belli, who quickly realised Baggott's potential. Baggott attended the British International School during his time in Jakarta and was appointed as captain for his school team. His family eventually decided to settle in England in 2011. Following the move, he attended St Benedict's Catholic College in Colchester.

== Club career ==
=== Ipswich Town ===
Having joined Ipswich Town on a two-year scholarship in 2019, Baggott made his senior debut for the club on 6 October 2020, in a 2–0 victory over Gillingham in the EFL Trophy. On 28 January 2021, Baggott penned his first professional contract with Ipswich, signing a two-and-a-half-year contract with the option of an additional year's extension.

On 16 April 2022, he became the first Indonesian player to play in an English professional league when he appeared for Ipswich Town in an EFL League One match against Rotherham United. Baggott signed a new three-year deal with the club in June 2022.

On 1 November 2023, Baggott scored his first goal for the Blues against Fulham in a 1–3 defeat in the fourth round of the EFL Cup, making him the first Indonesian to score a goal in the competition.

==== King's Lynn Town (loan) ====
On 22 March 2021, Baggott joined National League side King's Lynn Town on a youth loan for the remainder of the 2020–21 season. He made his debut for the club on 23 March 2021, playing 90 minutes in a 3–0 loss to Altrincham.

==== Gillingham (loan) ====
On 8 July 2022, Baggott joined League Two club Gillingham on a season-long loan deal. He made his league debut for the club on 30 July 2022 in a 2–0 away loss to AFC Wimbledon. On 15 October 2022, Baggott scored his first goal for Gillingham against Stevenage. He was the first Indonesian player to score in English football. Baggott scored another goal the next week against Barrow.

==== Cheltenham Town (loan) ====
In January 2023, Baggott was recalled from his loan at Gillingham and joined League One club Cheltenham Town on loan until the end of the season. Baggott only played one game for the club against Barnsley on 18 February 2023.

==== Bristol Rovers (loan) ====
On 1 February 2024, Baggott joined League One club Bristol Rovers on loan for the remainder of the season. On 4 February 2024, Baggott made his debut, subbed-on in stoppage time, in a 1–0 win against Exeter City.

On 13 April 2024, Baggott scored his first goal for the club against his former club Cheltenham Town in a 3–1 win, capping off a performance that earned him a place in the League One and overall EFL Teams of the Week. Despite having had a difficult start to his loan spell, he continued to turn his form around, impressing manager Matt Taylor with both his mobility and physicality.

==== Blackpool (loan) ====
On 5 August 2024, Baggott joined League One side Blackpool on a season-long loan deal. Baggott made his debut for the club on 13 August 2024, in the first round of EFL Cup against Burton Albion in a 4–0 win. Baggott suffered an injury disrupted first half of the 2024–25 season, missing all of September and October due to an ankle injury sustained in training, before suffering a thigh injury in his first match back on 6 November that ruled him out for the remainder of 2024.

=== Millwall ===
On 15 July 2026, Baggott joined EFL Championship club Millwall for an undisclosed fee on a "long-term contract."

== International career ==
Even though he was born in Thailand into a mixed English and Indonesian family, he decided to represent Indonesia at the international level.

Baggott has played for Indonesia at the under-19 level. He won his first cap for the under-19 team on 11 October 2020 in a friendly against North Macedonia U19. He received a call to join the senior Indonesia national football team in May 2021 but rejected it due to COVID-19 travel restrictions.

On 22 October 2021, the Chief of PSSI, Mochamad Iriawan, stated that Baggott had refused to play for Indonesia after rejecting multiple call-ups. Baggott immediately sent a letter to PSSI explaining his absence and his willingness to accept the next call-up, citing the fact that the COVID-19 situation in the United Kingdom and Indonesia have been much better. Iriawan openly accepted his explanation three days later.

On 16 November 2021, he made his debut for the senior team in a friendly match against Afghanistan. He played for 68 minutes and was substituted by Victor Igbonefo due to a concussion head injury, which resulted in a Football Association mandatory 14-day 'no footballing activity' recuperation period. Baggott was cleared to play again on 2 December 2021, after a neurological MRI scan concluded no lasting damage. On 12 December 2021, Baggott made his senior team competitive debut against Laos in the AFF Suzuki Cup, played in Singapore, in which Indonesia won the match 5–1. He scored his first goal for the national team on 19 December 2021, netting a header for the last goal of a 4–1 win against Malaysia.

Baggott again represented the senior national team for the 2023 AFC Asian Cup qualification – third round competition in Kuwait from 8 to 14 June. Baggott played in all 3 matches against Kuwait, Jordan, and Nepal. Baggott helped Indonesia secure qualification for the Asian Cup that took place in January 2024. Baggott scored his second international goal in the 7–0 win over Nepal.

Baggott was named in the provisional Indonesia squad for the 2022 AFF Championship but chose instead to stay with Gillingham during the busy December–January period of fixtures and with the Kent side bottom of League Two at the time of his call up.

Baggott was once again called up for the Indonesia squad for two friendlies against Burundi on 25 and 28 March 2023.

On 27 May 2023, Baggott received a call-up for the friendly matches against Palestine and Argentina. He started both matches and played the full game.

On 29 August, Baggott received a call-up to the under-23 team for the 2024 AFC U-23 Asian Cup qualification. He made his debut for the under-23 team against Chinese Taipei, where he also scored a goal in a 9–0 win.

In January 2024, Baggott was named in the final squad for the 2023 AFC Asian Cup tournament in Qatar. He featured twice in the group-stage phase as they qualified as one of the four best third-placed teams. He played the full ninety minutes as Indonesia were defeated 4–0 by Australia. Baggott himself opened the scoring for the opposition with an own goal after twelve minutes.

In March 2026, Baggott received his first call-up to the national team for two years under new coach John Herdman.

== Career statistics ==
=== Club ===
As of match played 19 September 2026

Appearances and goals by club, season and competition
Club	Season	League			FA Cup		EFL Cup		Other (Note: Appearance(s) in EFL Trophy)		Total	
Club	Season	Division	Apps	Goals	Apps	Goals	Apps	Goals	Apps	Goals	Apps	Goals
Ipswich Town	2020–21	League One	0	0	0	0	0	0	1	0	1	0
Ipswich Town	2021–22	League One	2	0	0	0	0	0	0	0	2	0
Ipswich Town	2023–24	Championship	0	0	0	0	4	1	—		4	1
Ipswich Town	2025–26	Championship	0	0	2	0	0	0	—		2	0
Ipswich Town	Total		2	0	2	0	4	1	1	0	9	1
King's Lynn Town (loan)	2020–21	National League	7	0	0	0	—		0	0	7	0
Gillingham (loan)	2022–23	League Two	19	2	3	1	4	0	3	0	29	3
Cheltenham Town (loan)	2022–23	League One	1	0	0	0	0	0	0	0	1	0
Bristol Rovers (loan)	2023–24	League One	14	1	0	0	0	0	0	0	14	1
Blackpool (loan)	2024–25	League One	18	0	0	0	1	0	1	0	20	0
Millwall	2026–27	Championship	6	0	0	0	2	0	0	0	8	0
Career total			67	3	5	1	11	1	5	0	88	5

=== International ===
As of match played 5 October 2026

Appearances and goals by national team and year
National team	Year	Apps	Goals
Indonesia	2021	6	1
Indonesia	2022	6	1
Indonesia	2023	7	0
Indonesia	2024	5	0
Indonesia	2026	8	1
Total		32	3

As of match played 5 October 2026
Scores and results list Indonesia's goal tally first, score column indicates score after each Baggott goal.

List of international goals scored by Elkan Baggott
No.	Date	Venue	Cap	Opponent	Score	Result	Competition
1	19 December 2021	National Stadium, Kallang, Singapore	3	Malaysia	4–1	4–1	2020 AFF Championship
2	14 June 2022	Jaber Al-Ahmad International Stadium, Kuwait City, Kuwait	10	Nepal	5–0	7–0	2023 AFC Asian Cup qualification
3	5 October 2026	Gelora Bung Karno Stadium, Jakarta, Indonesia	32	Thailand	2–2	2–2 (a.e.t.) (4–2 p)	2026 FIFA ASEAN Cup

== Honours ==
Indonesia U23

- SEA Games bronze medal: 2021

Indonesia

- FIFA ASEAN Cup: 2026
- AFF Championship runner-up: 2020

== See also ==
- List of Indonesia international footballers born outside Indonesia
