= Erigo =

Indonesian clothing brand

ERIGO
- Type: Limited
- Industry: Fashion; apparel
- Founded: 2013; 13 years ago
- Founders: Muhammad Sadad
- Headquarters: Erigo Fulfilment Center, Jalan Legok Raya, Tangerang, Indonesia
- Area served: Worldwide
- Key people: Muhammad Sadad
- Revenue: ▲$5 million (2024)
- Number of employees: 353 (2024)
- Website: erigostore.co.id

Erigo (stylized as ERIGO), is an Indonesian fashion brand founded in Tangerang, Banten by Muhammad Sadad which designs, manufactures, distributes and retails ready-to-wear, leather goods, shoes, and accessories. It has a sportswear sub-brand, Ergonomic Sporty Outfit (Erspo) which has been the apparel for the Indonesian national football team since 2024. Its headquarters and warehouse are located at Legok, Tangerang.

Erigo was founded in 2013 by Muhammad Sadad, initially marketing batik- and ikat-themed products, but it later turned into a casual one a year later. Sadad previously started his fashion business inside an apartment at Depok in 2011, without any employees or teams. Erigo subsequently launched their own online webstore and participated in offline events such as JakCloth to promote their brand. In 2017, the company joined with Shopee and Erigo experienced a rise of sales in 2020, ten times that of the previous year.

== Sponsorships ==
=== eSports ===
==== Teams ====
- (Indonesia) SMK Taruna Bhakti

=== Football ===
==== National teams ====
- Indonesia (2024-25)
