= Mitchell Baker (footballer) =

Indonesian footballer (born 2006)

- Baker with Indonesia in 2026

Personal information
- Full name: Mitchell Lee Baker
- Date of birth: 11 December 2006 (age 19)
- Place of birth: Melbourne, Australia
- Height: 1.96 m (6 ft 5 in)
- Position: Striker

Team information
- Current team: Vermont Green
- Number: 9

Youth career
- HKFC
- Kitchee
- Melbourne Victory
- –2024: Black Rock

College career
Years	Team	Apps	(Gls)
2024–	Georgetown Hoyas	51	(26)

Senior career*
Years	Team	Apps	(Gls)
2025–2026	Malvern City	8	(3)
2026–	Vermont Green	1	(0)

International career^{‡}
2026–	Indonesia	8	(9)
Medal record
Men's football
Representing Indonesia
FIFA ASEAN Cup
Winner	2026 Indonesia	Team
- * Club domestic league appearances and goals as of 2 April 2026 ‡ National team caps and goals as of 5 October 2026

Mitchell Lee Baker (born 11 December 2006) commonly known as Mitch, is a professional footballer who plays as a striker for USL League Two club Vermont Green. Born in Australia, he plays for the Indonesia national team.

== College career ==
=== Georgetown Hoyas ===
Baker played collegiate soccer for the Georgetown Hoyas, making 42 appearances and scoring 58 goals.

== Professional career ==
At the 2026 MLS SuperDraft, he was selected in the first round (tenth overall) by Colorado Rapids.

=== Vermont Green ===
In 2026, Baker joined Vermont Green FC of USL League Two. He played in the club's U.S. Open Cup second-round match against Westchester SC on 2 April 2026. Baker missed his spot kick in the ensuing penalty shoot-out as Vermont Green were eliminated from the competition.

== International career ==
Baker made his senior international debut for the Indonesian national team on 27 July 2026 in a 2026 ASEAN Championship group stage match against Cambodia, scoring a hat-trick in a 5–1 victory.

In the 2026 FIFA ASEAN Cup, Baker set a record for the second highest goals in a single match for the national team by scoring 5 goals against Bangladesh, including a stoppage time goal at the 97th minute, that sent Indonesia through to the final with a 9–2 victory. Baker also became a top scorer of this tournament.

== Personal life ==
Baker was born in Melbourne to an Australian father, Daniel Robert Baker, and an Indonesian mother, Maureen Lee Baker. He moved to Hong Kong with his family when he was one years old, and spent ten years in the city. He grew up playing football and rugby at Hong Kong Football Club, before moving back to Australia.

On 13 July 2026, Baker officially obtained Indonesian citizenship.

== Career statistics ==
=== International ===
As of match played 5 October 2026

Appearances and goals by national team and year
National team	Year	Apps	Goals
Indonesia	2026	8	9
Total		8	9

As of match played 5 October 2026
Scores and results list Indonesia's goal tally first, score column indicates score after each Baker goal.

List of international goals scored by Mitchell Baker
No.	Date	Venue	Opponent	Score	Result	Competition
1.	27 July 2026	Pakansari Stadium, Bogor, Indonesia	Cambodia	1–0	5–1	2026 ASEAN Championship
2.	27 July 2026	Pakansari Stadium, Bogor, Indonesia	Cambodia	2–0	5–1	2026 ASEAN Championship
3.	27 July 2026	Pakansari Stadium, Bogor, Indonesia	Cambodia	4–1	5–1	2026 ASEAN Championship
4.	31 July 2026	Chonburi Stadium, Chonburi, Thailand	Timor-Leste	3–0	3–0	2026 ASEAN Championship
5.	1 October 2026	Gelora Bung Karno Stadium, Jakarta, Indonesia	Bangladesh	1–0	9–2	2026 FIFA ASEAN Cup
6.	1 October 2026	Gelora Bung Karno Stadium, Jakarta, Indonesia	Bangladesh	2–0	9–2	2026 FIFA ASEAN Cup
7.	1 October 2026	Gelora Bung Karno Stadium, Jakarta, Indonesia	Bangladesh	4–1	9–2	2026 FIFA ASEAN Cup
8.	1 October 2026	Gelora Bung Karno Stadium, Jakarta, Indonesia	Bangladesh	5–1	9–2	2026 FIFA ASEAN Cup
9.	1 October 2026	Gelora Bung Karno Stadium, Jakarta, Indonesia	Bangladesh	9–2	9–2	2026 FIFA ASEAN Cup

== Honours ==
Indonesia

- FIFA ASEAN Cup: 2026

Individual

- FIFA ASEAN Cup Top Goalscorer: 2026

== See also ==
- List of Indonesia international footballers born outside Indonesia
