= 2026 FIFA ASEAN Cup =

Inaugural edition of the FIFA ASEAN Cup

Piala Perbara FIFA 2026 (Indonesian) 2026年國際足協東盟盃 (Chinese)

Tournament details
- Host country: Indonesia (ASEAN Cup); Hong Kong (ASEAN Challenge Cup)
- Dates: 24 September – 5 October
- Teams: 14 (from 3 sub-confederations)
- Venues: 4 (in 3 host cities)

Final positions
- Champions: Indonesia (1st title; ASEAN Cup); Hong Kong (1st title; ASEAN Challenge Cup)
- Runners-up: Thailand (ASEAN Cup); Cambodia (ASEAN Challenge Cup)
- Third place: Malaysia (ASEAN Cup)
- Fourth place: Vietnam (ASEAN Cup)

Tournament statistics
- Matches played: 21
- Goals scored: 67 (3.19 per match)
- Top scorer(s): ASEAN Cup (Indonesia) Mitchell Baker (5 goals); ASEAN Challenge Cup (Hong Kong) Matt Orr (3 goals)

The 2026 FIFA ASEAN Cup was the inaugural edition of the FIFA ASEAN Cup, an international football competition sanctioned by FIFA for men's national teams of Southeast Asia and guest teams. The tournament took place during the FIFA international window from 24 September to 5 October.

The tournament comprised two competitions: the FIFA ASEAN Cup, hosted by Indonesia, and the FIFA ASEAN Challenge Cup, hosted by Hong Kong. The FIFA ASEAN Cup champions were reported to receive a prize of US$1 million, with the total prize pool estimated at US$4 million. However, this was slashed by 35% to US$650,000 three days before the start of the tournament.

== Background ==
FIFA president Gianni Infantino announced the launch of the FIFA ASEAN Cup on 26 October 2025, following the signing of a memorandum of understanding at the 47th ASEAN Summit in Kuala Lumpur, Malaysia, witnessed by Malaysian prime minister Anwar Ibrahim. The competition was announced unilaterally by FIFA; the ASEAN Football Federation (AFF) was reportedly unaware of the plan for a second Southeast Asian men's tournament prior to the announcement.

The AFF has organised the ASEAN Championship, the existing premier football tournament for Southeast Asian men's national teams since 1996. A key distinction between the two competitions is that the FIFA ASEAN Cup is held within official FIFA international windows, meaning clubs are obliged to release their players for the tournament. The ASEAN Championship has historically been played outside those windows, with no such obligation on clubs. The competition follows the model of the FIFA Arab Cup, a FIFA-sanctioned regional tournament for teams in West Asia and North Africa.

On 20 March 2026, the FIFA Council officially approved the inaugural FIFA ASEAN Cup at an online meeting, scheduling it for September–October 2026, after the 2026 ASEAN Championship. Following the 76th FIFA Congress in Vancouver, FIFA and the ASEAN Football Federation signed a memorandum of understanding confirming the tournament's two-division structure and host countries.

The second division held in Hong Kong was quietly rebranded as the FIFA ASEAN Challenge Cup while the tournament was in progress.

== Host countries ==
The eight teams competing in the FIFA ASEAN Cup were divided into two groups and played their matches in Indonesia, at the Gelora Bung Karno Stadium in Jakarta and Si Jalak Harupat Stadium in Bandung. Hong Kong is a member of the East Asian Football Federation (EAFF), and participated as the FIFA ASEAN Challenge Cup host. Matches were held at Kai Tak Stadium and Mong Kok Stadium.

=== Venues ===
FIFA ASEAN Cup		FIFA ASEAN Challenge Cup	
(Indonesia) Jakarta	(Indonesia) Bandung	Hong Kong	
Gelora Bung Karno Stadium	Si Jalak Harupat Stadium	Kai Tak Stadium	Mong Kok Stadium
Capacity: 77,193	Capacity: 27,000	Capacity: 50,000	Capacity: 6,664
2026 FIFA ASEAN Cup is located in Indonesia		2026 FIFA ASEAN Cup is located in Hong Kong	

== Participating teams ==
A total of 14 to 16 teams were planned for the inaugural edition. All members of the ASEAN Football Federation (AFF) had a guaranteed slot. China, India and Hong Kong were invited to the competition. However, China, focusing on their preparation for the upcoming AFC Asian Cup, decided not to participate, and was replaced by Pakistan. India which was already drawn to be part of Group A withdrew due to commitments to play a friendly match with Brazil at Kolkata, and was then replaced by Bangladesh. Australia was the only AFF member not to enter.

From July 2026 FIFA World Ranking
FIFA ASEAN Cup	FIFA ASEAN Challenge Cup
Indonesia (118) (host); Thailand (94); Vietnam (99); Philippines (135); Malaysia (136); Singapore (148); Bangladesh (181) (SAFF); Pakistan (198) (SAFF)	Hong Kong (156) (host, EAFF); Myanmar (158); Cambodia (175); Laos (185); Brunei (194); Timor-Leste (201)

== Squads ==
The 14 national teams involved in the tournament were required to register a squad of 23 players, including three goalkeepers. Only players in these squads were eligible to take part in the tournament. The position listed for each player is per the official squad list published by FIFA on 24 September 2026.

== Match officials ==
FIFA appointed the following match officials for the tournament.

Confederation	Referee	Assistant referees	Video assistant referee
AFC	(Australia) Ben Abraham	(Australia) Arvin Shanmuganathan	(Hong Kong) Luk Kin Sun (Tajikistan) Amirjon Khorkashev (Uzbekistan) Akobirxo'ja Shukurullayev (Vietnam) Ngô Duy Lân
AFC	(Hong Kong) Wong Wai Lun	(Hong Kong) Law Ming Leong (Hong Kong) Fok Pong Shing	(Hong Kong) Luk Kin Sun (Tajikistan) Amirjon Khorkashev (Uzbekistan) Akobirxo'ja Shukurullayev (Vietnam) Ngô Duy Lân
AFC	(Indonesia) Thoriq Alkatiri	(Indonesia) Bambang Syamsudar (Indonesia) Nurhadi Sulchan	(Hong Kong) Luk Kin Sun (Tajikistan) Amirjon Khorkashev (Uzbekistan) Akobirxo'ja Shukurullayev (Vietnam) Ngô Duy Lân
AFC	(Kyrgyzstan) Sanzhar Zhakypbekov (Kyrgyzstan) Zayniddin Alimov	(Kyrgyzstan) Eldiar Salbaev (Kyrgyzstan) Kanat Myrsabekov (Kyrgyzstan) Abdugani Abdukarimov	(Hong Kong) Luk Kin Sun (Tajikistan) Amirjon Khorkashev (Uzbekistan) Akobirxo'ja Shukurullayev (Vietnam) Ngô Duy Lân
AFC	(South Korea) Ko Hyung-jin (South Korea) Kim Hee-gon (South Korea) Kim Jong-hyeok	(South Korea) Yoon Jae-yeol (South Korea) Kwak Seung-soon (South Korea) Cheon Jin-hee (South Korea) Lee Hwa-pyung (South Korea) Park Kyun-yong	(Hong Kong) Luk Kin Sun (Tajikistan) Amirjon Khorkashev (Uzbekistan) Akobirxo'ja Shukurullayev (Vietnam) Ngô Duy Lân
AFC	(Malaysia) Razlan Joffri Ali	(Malaysia) Arif Shamil (Malaysia) Kesava Raj	(Hong Kong) Luk Kin Sun (Tajikistan) Amirjon Khorkashev (Uzbekistan) Akobirxo'ja Shukurullayev (Vietnam) Ngô Duy Lân
AFC	(Singapore) Muhammad Taqi	(Singapore) Abdul Hannan (Singapore) Andy Tan	(Hong Kong) Luk Kin Sun (Tajikistan) Amirjon Khorkashev (Uzbekistan) Akobirxo'ja Shukurullayev (Vietnam) Ngô Duy Lân
AFC	(Tajikistan) Abdullo Davlatov (Tajikistan) Nasrullo Kabirov	(Tajikistan) Akmal Buriev (Tajikistan) Vafo Karaev (Tajikistan) Khusravi Siddikzod	(Hong Kong) Luk Kin Sun (Tajikistan) Amirjon Khorkashev (Uzbekistan) Akobirxo'ja Shukurullayev (Vietnam) Ngô Duy Lân
AFC	(Thailand) Mongkolchai Pechsri (Thailand) Torphong Somsing	(Thailand) Thanet Chucheun (Thailand) Chotrawee Thongduang (Thailand) Nattaphon Mala (Thailand) Rachen Srichai	(Hong Kong) Luk Kin Sun (Tajikistan) Amirjon Khorkashev (Uzbekistan) Akobirxo'ja Shukurullayev (Vietnam) Ngô Duy Lân
AFC	(Turkmenistan) Resul Mammedov	(Turkmenistan) Ahmet Beknazarow (Turkmenistan) Begenç Allaberdyýew	(Hong Kong) Luk Kin Sun (Tajikistan) Amirjon Khorkashev (Uzbekistan) Akobirxo'ja Shukurullayev (Vietnam) Ngô Duy Lân
AFC	(Uzbekistan) Abdurashid Khudoyberganov (Uzbekistan) Akhrol Riskullaev (Uzbekistan) Rustam Lutfullin	(Uzbekistan) Sanjar Shayusupov (Uzbekistan) Akmal Giyasov	(Hong Kong) Luk Kin Sun (Tajikistan) Amirjon Khorkashev (Uzbekistan) Akobirxo'ja Shukurullayev (Vietnam) Ngô Duy Lân

== Group stage ==
The group stage was played from 24 September to 2 October 2026 and was divided into two separate competitions: the FIFA ASEAN Cup and the FIFA ASEAN Challenge Cup. The FIFA ASEAN Cup featured eight teams divided into two groups of four, while the FIFA ASEAN Challenge Cup featured six teams divided into two groups of three. Both competitions used a single round-robin format, with teams playing each other once. Three points were awarded for a win, one point for a draw, and no points for a loss.

In the FIFA ASEAN Cup, the winners of Groups A and B advanced to the FIFA ASEAN Cup Final, while the runners-up advanced to the bronze final. In the FIFA ASEAN Challenge Cup, the winners of Groups A and B advanced to the FIFA ASEAN Challenge Cup final.

All match times are in local time: WIB (UTC+7) for the FIFA ASEAN Cup and HKT (UTC+8) for the FIFA ASEAN Challenge Cup.

Tie-breaking criteria for group stage ranking
The ranking of teams in each group was determined by the points obtained in all group matches. If two or more teams were equal on points, the following criteria were used to determine the ranking:
1. Greatest number of points obtained in the group matches between the teams concerned;
2. Superior goal difference resulting from the group matches between the teams concerned;
3. Greatest number of goals scored in all group matches between the teams concerned.

If, after having applied criteria a) to c) above, teams still have an equal ranking, and in order to determine their final rankings, criteria a) to c) above are applied to the matches between the remaining teams only. If no decision can be made through this procedure, criteria d) to f) below shall apply as follows to the two or more teams still equal on points:

4. Superior goal difference in all group matches;
5. Most goals scored in all group matches;
6. Highest team conduct ("fair play") score in all group matches (only one deduction could be applied to a player or team coach/official in a single match):
  - Yellow card: −1 point;
  - Indirect red card (second yellow card): −3 points;
  - Direct red card: −4 points;
  - Yellow card and direct red card: −5 points;
7. Better position in the most recent FIFA Men's World Ranking;
8. Better position in progressively older FIFA Men's World Rankings until teams could be separated.

=== FIFA ASEAN Cup ===
==== Group A ====
Pos	Team	Pld	W	D	L	GF	GA	GD	Pts	Qualification
1	Indonesia (H)	3	2	1	0	11	2	+9	7 (Note: Tied on head-to-head result (Malaysia 0–0 Indonesia) and total goal difference (+9), ranked on total goals scored.)	Advance to final
2	Malaysia	3	2	1	0	9	0	+9	7	Advance to bronze final
3	Singapore	3	1	0	2	1	8	−7	3	
4	Bangladesh	3	0	0	3	2	13	−11	0	

Source: FIFA
(H) Hosts
Notes:
25 September 2026
16:00 UTC+7

Bangladesh	0–3	Malaysia
	FIFA Report; GSA Report	Arif 18', 37'; Bérgson 52'

Gelora Bung Karno Stadium, Jakarta
Referee: Resul Mammedov (Turkmenistan)
25 September 2026
20:00 UTC+7

Indonesia	2–0	Singapore
Oratmangoen 13'; Romeny 74' (pen.)	FIFA Report; GSA Report

Gelora Bung Karno Stadium, Jakarta
Attendance: 38,702
Referee: Rustam Lutfullin (Uzbekistan)

28 September 2026
16:00 UTC+7

Singapore	1–0	Bangladesh
H. Stewart 35'	FIFA Report; GSA Report

Gelora Bung Karno Stadium, Jakarta
Referee: Mongkolchai Pechsri (Thailand)
28 September 2026
19:30 UTC+7

Malaysia	0–0	Indonesia
	FIFA Report; GSA Report

Gelora Bung Karno Stadium, Jakarta
Attendance: 56,894
Referee: Ko Hyung-jin (South Korea)

1 October 2026
19:30 UTC+7

Indonesia	9–2	Bangladesh
Baker 11', 20', 37', 42', 90+7'; Ridho 32'; Hubner 45+1'; Vickery 90'; Diks 90+6'	FIFA Report; GSA Report	Emon 36'; Wahid 90+1'

Gelora Bung Karno Stadium, Jakarta
Attendance: 33,595
Referee: Nasrullo Kabirov (Tajikistan)
1 October 2026
19:30 UTC+7

Malaysia	6–0	Singapore
Bérgson 8' (pen.), 62', 90+3'; Wilkin 26'; Josué 76'; Syahir 87'	FIFA Report; GSA Report

Si Jalak Harupat Stadium, Bandung
Referee: Kim Jong-hyeok (South Korea)

==== Group B ====
Pos	Team	Pld	W	D	L	GF	GA	GD	Pts	Qualification
1	Thailand	3	2	0	1	7	2	+5	6 (Note: Head-to-head result: Thailand 2–0 Vietnam.)	Advance to final
2	Vietnam	3	2	0	1	5	4	+1	6	Advance to bronze final
3	Philippines	3	1	1	1	4	4	0	4	
4	Pakistan	3	0	1	2	4	10	−6	1	

Source: FIFA
Notes:
26 September 2026
16:00 UTC+7

Pakistan	0–4	Thailand
	FIFA Report; GSA Report	Teerasak 31', 84'; Soonsup-Bell 41'; Zeb 64' (o.g.)

Si Jalak Harupat Stadium, Bandung
Referee: Kim Hee-gon (South Korea)
26 September 2026
20:02 UTC+7 (Note: The Vietnam v Philippines match, originally scheduled for 19:30 UTC+7, was delayed for 32 minutes due to weather conditions.)

Vietnam	1–0	Philippines
Nguyễn Đình Bắc 25'	FIFA Report; GSA Report

Si Jalak Harupat Stadium, Bandung
Referee: Thoriq Alkatiri (Indonesia)

29 September 2026
16:00 UTC+7

Philippines	2–2	Pakistan
Reyes 24'; Kristensen 32' (pen.)	FIFA Report; GSA Report	Ali Khan 47'; Arshad 62'

Si Jalak Harupat Stadium, Bandung
Referee: Abdurashid Khudoyberganov (Uzbekistan)
29 September 2026
19:30 UTC+7

Thailand	2–0	Vietnam
Sarach 10'; Chaiyaphon 90+3'	FIFA Report; GSA Report

Si Jalak Harupat Stadium, Bandung
Referee: Ben Abraham (Australia)

2 October 2026
16:00 UTC+7

Vietnam	4–2	Pakistan
Nguyễn Hai Long 51'; Nguyễn Hoàng Đức 57'; Nguyễn Đình Bắc 80'; Williams Minh Hoàng 90+1'	FIFA Report; GSA Report	Mohib 31'; Kaleemullah 88'

Gelora Bung Karno Stadium, Jakarta
Referee: Muhammad Taqi (Singapore)
2 October 2026
16:40 UTC+7

Thailand	1–2	Philippines
Iklas 55'	FIFA Report; GSA Report	Kristensen 3', 68'

Si Jalak Harupat Stadium, Bandung
Referee: Razlan Joffri Ali (Malaysia)

=== FIFA ASEAN Challenge Cup ===
==== Group A ====
Pos	Team	Pld	W	D	L	GF	GA	GD	Pts	Qualification
1	Hong Kong (H)	2	2	0	0	6	0	+6	6	Advance to final
2	Laos	2	1	0	1	3	5	−2	3	
3	Brunei	2	0	0	2	1	5	−4	0	

Source: FIFA
(H) Hosts
24 September 2026
17:00 UTC+8

Laos	3–1	Brunei
Bounphachan 4' (pen.); Xayasith 24'; Bounchay 67'	FIFA Report; GSA Report	Haziq 45+1'

Mong Kok Stadium, Kowloon
Attendance: 250
Referee: Wong Wai Lun (Hong Kong)

27 September 2026
15:00 UTC+8

Hong Kong	4–0	Laos
Sun Ming Him 12'; Camargo 33'; Dudu 55'; Orr 90+1' (pen.)	FIFA Report; GSA Report

Kai Tak Stadium, Kowloon
Attendance: 18,873
Referee: Sanzhar Zhakypbekov (Kyrgyzstan)

30 September 2026
20:00 UTC+8

Brunei	0–2	Hong Kong
	FIFA Report; GSA Report	Chan Siu Kwan 60'; Orr 90+1'

Kai Tak Stadium, Kowloon
Attendance: 20,116
Referee: Abdullo Davlatov (Tajikistan)

==== Group B ====
Pos	Team	Pld	W	D	L	GF	GA	GD	Pts	Qualification
1	Cambodia	2	1	1	0	3	2	+1	4	Advance to final
2	Myanmar	2	1	0	1	2	1	+1	3	
3	Timor-Leste	2	0	1	1	2	4	−2	1	

Source: FIFA
24 September 2026
20:00 UTC+8

Myanmar	2–0	Timor-Leste
Win Naing Tun 19'; Than Paing 75'	FIFA Report; GSA Report

Mong Kok Stadium, Kowloon
Referee: Zayniddin Alimov (Kyrgyzstan)

27 September 2026
18:00 UTC+8

Cambodia	1–0	Myanmar
Kakada 90+4'	FIFA Report; GSA Report

Kai Tak Stadium, Kowloon
Referee: Wong Wai Lun (Hong Kong)

30 September 2026
17:00 UTC+8

Timor-Leste	2–2	Cambodia
João Pedro 17'; Bakhito 58'	FIFA Report; GSA Report	Nieto 28', 38' (pen.)

Kai Tak Stadium, Kowloon
Referee: Torphong Somsing (Thailand)

== Bronze final ==
The runners-up of Groups A and B in the FIFA ASEAN Cup contested the bronze final on 5 October 2026 at the Gelora Bung Karno Stadium in Jakarta. The FIFA ASEAN Challenge Cup did not feature a bronze final, with only the group winners advancing to its final.

=== FIFA ASEAN Cup ===
5 October 2026
16:00 UTC+7

Malaysia	1–0	Vietnam
Tierney 62'	FIFA Report; GSA Report

Gelora Bung Karno Stadium, Jakarta
Referee: Ko Hyung-jin (South Korea)

== Finals ==
=== FIFA ASEAN Cup ===
5 October 2026
20:00 UTC+7

Indonesia	2–2 (a.e.t.)	Thailand
James 84'; Baggott 116'	FIFA Report; GSA Report	Iklas 87'; Peeradol 111'
Penalties
Diks (penalty scored); James (penalty scored); Baggott (penalty scored); Pattynama (penalty scored)	4–2	(penalty scored) Bihr; (penalty scored) Waris; (penalty missed) Sarach; (penalty missed) Nattapong

Gelora Bung Karno Stadium, Jakarta
Attendance: 70,098
Referee: Akhrol Riskullaev (Uzbekistan)

=== FIFA ASEAN Challenge Cup ===
3 October 2026
18:00 UTC+8

Hong Kong	2–0	Cambodia
Orr 41'; Everton 58' (pen.)	FIFA Report; GSA Report

Kai Tak Stadium, Kowloon
Attendance: 31,374
Referee: Sanzhar Zhakypbekov (Kyrgyzstan)

== Statistics ==
=== FIFA ASEAN Cup ===
There were 48 goals scored in 14 matches, for an average of 3.43 goals per match.

5 goals

- (Indonesia) Mitchell Baker

4 goals

- (Malaysia) Bérgson

3 goals

- (Philippines) Bjørn Martin Kristensen

2 goals

- (Malaysia) Arif Aiman
- (Thailand) Teerasak Poeiphimai
- (Thailand) Iklas Sanron
- (Vietnam) Nguyễn Đình Bắc

1 goal

- (Bangladesh) Shahriar Emon
- (Bangladesh) Farhaan Ali Wahid
- (Indonesia) Elkan Baggott
- (Indonesia) Kevin Diks
- (Indonesia) Justin Hubner
- (Indonesia) Dean James
- (Indonesia) Ragnar Oratmangoen
- (Indonesia) Rizky Ridho
- (Indonesia) Ole Romeny
- (Indonesia) Luke Vickery
- (Malaysia) Syahir Bashah
- (Malaysia) Paulo Josué
- (Malaysia) Fergus Tierney
- (Malaysia) Stuart Wilkin
- (Pakistan) Abdul Arshad
- (Pakistan) Ali Khan
- (Pakistan) Kaleemullah Khan
- (Pakistan) Mohib Ullah
- (Philippines) Sandro Reyes
- (Singapore) Harhys Stewart
- (Thailand) Peeradol Chamrasamee
- (Thailand) Chaiyaphon Otton
- (Thailand) Jude Soonsup-Bell
- (Thailand) Sarach Yooyen
- (Vietnam) Nguyễn Hai Long
- (Vietnam) Nguyễn Hoàng Đức
- (Vietnam) Williams Minh Hoàng

1 own goal

- (Pakistan) Haris Zeb (against Thailand)

=== FIFA ASEAN Challenge Cup ===
There were 19 goals scored in 7 matches, for an average of 2.71 goals per match.

3 goals

- (Hong Kong) Matt Orr

2 goals

- (Cambodia) Andrés Nieto
- (Hong Kong) Everton Camargo

1 goal

- (Brunei) Haziq Naqiuddin Syamra
- (Cambodia) Sin Kakada
- (Hong Kong) Dudu
- (Hong Kong) Chan Siu Kwan
- (Hong Kong) Sun Ming Him
- (Laos) Bounphachan Bounkong
- (Laos) Bounchay Chernvanglien
- (Laos) Xayasith Singsavang
- (Myanmar) Than Paing
- (Myanmar) Win Naing Tun
- (Timor-Leste) Alexandro Bakhito
- (Timor-Leste) João Pedro

=== Discipline ===
A player or team official was automatically suspended for the next match of the tournament for the following offenses:

- Receiving a red card (red card suspensions could be extended for serious offenses).
- Receiving two yellow cards in the tournament. (Note: As yellow cards were not carried forward to penalty shootouts, players could be shown two yellow cards in the same match without being sent off. However, this would result in a suspension for accumulating two yellow cards during the tournament.)

The following suspensions were accumulated during the tournament:

Suspensions for players and team officials
Player	Offense(s)	Suspension(s)
(Singapore national football team) Safuwan Baharudin	(red card) in FIFA ASEAN Cup Group A vs Indonesia (25 September)	FIFA ASEAN Cup Group A vs Bangladesh (28 September)
(Indonesia national football team) Thom Haye	(red card) in FIFA ASEAN Cup Group A vs Malaysia (28 September)	FIFA ASEAN Cup Group A vs Bangladesh (1 October)
(Thailand national football team) Nicholas Mickelson	(yellow card) (yellow-red card) in FIFA ASEAN Cup final vs Indonesia (5 October)	Suspension served outside the tournament

=== Prize money ===
The following prize distribution has been reported.

Result	Prize money
FIFA ASEAN Cup champion	US$650,000
FIFA ASEAN Challenge Cup champion	US$300,000
Team participation fee	US$125,000
Total prize pool: ~US$1,075,000

== Final ranking ==
=== FIFA ASEAN Cup ===
As per statistical convention in football, matches decided in extra time are counted as wins and losses, while matches decided by penalty shoot-outs are counted as draws.

Pos	Grp	Team	P	W	D	L	GF	GA	GD	Pts.
1	A	Indonesia	4	2	2	0	13	4	+9	8
2	B	Thailand	4	2	1	1	9	4	+5	7
3	A	Malaysia	4	3	1	0	10	0	+10	10
4	B	Vietnam	4	2	0	2	5	5	0	6
Eliminated in group stage
5	B	Philippines	3	1	1	1	4	4	0	4
6	A	Singapore	3	1	0	2	1	8	−7	3
7	B	Pakistan	3	0	1	2	4	10	−6	1
8	A	Bangladesh	3	0	0	3	2	13	−11	0

=== FIFA ASEAN Challenge Cup ===
As per statistical convention in football, matches decided in extra time are counted as wins and losses, while matches decided by penalty shoot-outs are counted as draws.

Pos	Grp	Team	P	W	D	L	GF	GA	GD	Pts.
1	A	Hong Kong	3	3	0	0	8	0	+8	9
2	B	Cambodia	3	1	1	1	3	4	−1	4
Eliminated in group stage
3	B	Myanmar	2	1	0	1	2	1	+1	3
4	A	Laos	2	1	0	1	3	-5	−2	3
5	B	Timor-Leste	2	0	1	1	2	4	−2	1
6	A	Brunei	2	0	0	2	1	5	−4	0

== Marketing ==
=== Broadcasting rights ===
Country	Broadcaster	Ref.
Australia	SBS	
Bangladesh	T Sports, Toffee	
Hong Kong	ViuTV	
Indonesia	Emtek, Nex, RANS	
Laos	LaoTV	
Malaysia	RTM (Note: RTM only broadcast matches involving the Malaysia national football team.)	
Pakistan	Tapmad	
Philippines	Tap Sports (Note: Tap Sports broadcast ASEAN Cup matches only.)	
Singapore	Mediacorp	
South Korea	ENA Sports	
Vietnam	FPT Play, TV360, MyTV	
International	FIFA+	

=== Sponsorship ===
Presenting partner	Premium sponsors
Aspetar	Adidas; Coca-Cola; Danantara Indonesia

== See also ==
- 2026 ASEAN Championship
- ASEAN Football Federation
- 2026 SAFF Championship
- FIFA Arab Cup
