= FIFA ASEAN Cup =

International football competition

- Organiser(s): FIFA
- Founded: 2026; 0 years ago
- Region: Southeast Asia
- Teams: ASEAN Cup: 8 ASEAN Challenge Cup: 6
- Current champions: ASEAN Cup; Indonesia (1st title); ASEAN Challenge Cup; Hong Kong (1st title)
- Most championships: ASEAN Cup; Indonesia (1 title); ASEAN Challenge Cup; Hong Kong (1 title)
- Website: fifa.com/aseancup
- 2026 FIFA ASEAN Cup

The FIFA ASEAN Cup is an international football competition sanctioned by FIFA for the men's national teams of Southeast Asia and guest teams.

The tournament is structured as two separate divisions, the second division was given its own distinct branding, the FIFA ASEAN Challenge Cup.

== Background ==
FIFA president Gianni Infantino announced the launch of the FIFA ASEAN Cup on 26 October 2025, following the signing of a memorandum of agreement at the 47th ASEAN Summit. The ceremony was held in Kuala Lumpur and witnessed by Malaysian Prime Minister Anwar Ibrahim. Unilaterally initiated by FIFA, the ASEAN Football Federation (AFF) was shocked, as they were unaware of any plans for a second Southeast Asian men's tournament prior to the announcement.

The AFF has organised the ASEAN Championship since 1996, and is regarded as the premier tournament of the men's national football teams of Southeast Asia. However, they were usually held outside the official FIFA international window, and thus clubs were not obliged to release their players for the ASEAN Championship. The FIFA ASEAN Cup plan follows the FIFA Arab Cup, a regional tournament for teams in West Asia and North Africa.

== Format ==
The tournament is structured as two separate divisions: Division 1 and Division 2. Midway the inaugural 2026 edition, the second division was given its own distinct branding, the FIFA ASEAN Challenge Cup.

Both divisions have a single round-robin format. FIFA ASEAN Cup features eight teams across two groups of four. Group winners advance to the final, while runners-up meet in the third place play-off. FIFA ASEAN Challenge Cup features six teams across two groups of three, with group winners advancing directly to the Challenge Cup final.

== Results ==
=== FIFA ASEAN Cup ===
| Year | Host | Final | | | Third place playoff | | | Number of teams |
| Year | Host | Winners | Score | Runners-up | Third place | Score | Fourth place | Number of teams |
|---|---|---|---|---|---|---|---|---|
| 2026 | Indonesia | Indonesia | 2–2 (a.e.t.) (4–2 p) | Thailand | Malaysia | 1–0 | Vietnam | 8 |

=== FIFA ASEAN Challenge Cup ===
| Year | Host | Final | | | Number of teams |
| Year | Host | Winners | Score | Runners-up | Number of teams |
|---|---|---|---|---|---|
| 2026 | Hong Kong | Hong Kong | 2–0 | Cambodia | 6 |

== Competition record ==
=== FIFA ASEAN Cup ===
| Team | Titles | Runners-up | Third place | Fourth place | Top 4 total |
|---|---|---|---|---|---|
| Indonesia | 1 (2026) | — | — | — | 1 |
| Thailand | — | 1 (2026) | — | — | 1 |
| Malaysia | — | — | 1 (2026) | — | 1 |
| Vietnam | — | — | — | 1 (2026) | 1 |

=== FIFA ASEAN Challenge Cup ===
| Team | Titles | Runners-up | Final total |
|---|---|---|---|
| Hong Kong | 1 (2026) | — | 1 |
| Cambodia | — | 1 (2026) | 1 |

== Hosts ==
| Year | Hosts | No. of groups | No. of teams |
|---|---|---|---|
| 2026 | Indonesia (FIFA ASEAN Cup) | 2 | 8 |
| 2026 | Hong Kong (FIFA ASEAN Challenge Cup) | 2 | 6 |

== Team results by tournament ==
Legend

- 1st – Champions
- 2nd – Runners-up
- 3rd – Third place
- 4th – Fourth place
- GS – Group stage
- — Hosts
- Q – Qualified / entrant team
- × – Withdrew after the draw
- – – Did not enter

=== FIFA ASEAN Cup ===
| Team | 2026 | Years |
AFF
| Indonesia | 1st | 1 |
| Malaysia | 3rd | 1 |
| Philippines | GS | 1 |
| Singapore | GS | 1 |
| Thailand | 2nd | 1 |
| Vietnam | 4th | 1 |
Invited teams
| Bangladesh^{(SAFF)} | GS | 1 |
| Pakistan^{(SAFF)} | GS | 1 |

=== FIFA ASEAN Challenge Cup ===
| Team | 2026 | Years |
AFF
| Brunei | GS | 1 |
| Cambodia | 2nd | 1 |
| Laos | GS | 1 |
| Myanmar | GS | 1 |
| Timor-Leste | GS | 1 |
Invited teams
| Hong Kong^{(EAFF)} | 1st | 1 |

== See also ==
- FIFA Arab Cup
- FIFA Series
- ASEAN Championship
- ASEAN Women's Championship
- AFF Women's Cup
- AFC Solidarity Cup
