= Thailand national football team =

Men's association football team

Thailand
- Nickname(s): ช้างศึก, Chang Suek (War Elephants)
- Association: Football Association of Thailand (FA Thailand)
- Confederation: AFC (Asia)
- Sub-confederation: AFF (Southeast Asia)
- Head coach: Anthony Hudson
- Captain: Chanathip Songkrasin
- Most caps: Kiatisuk Senamuang (134)
- Top scorer: Kiatisuk Senamuang (71)
- Home stadium: Rajamangala Stadium
- FIFA code: THA
First colours	Second colours	Third colours

FIFA ranking
- Current: 90 ▲3 (18 November 2026)
- Highest: 43 (September 1998)
- Lowest: 165 (October 2014)

First international
- Thailand 1–6 China (Bangkok, Thailand; 20 August 1948)

Biggest win
- Thailand 10–0 Brunei (Bangkok, Thailand; 24 May 1971); Timor-Leste 0–10 Thailand (Hanoi, Vietnam; 8 December 2024)

Biggest defeat
- Great Britain 9–0 Thailand (Melbourne, Australia; 30 November 1956)

Asian Cup
- Appearances: 9 (first in 1972)
- Best result: Third place (1972)

ASEAN Championship
- Appearances: 16 (first in 1996)
- Best result: Champions (1996, 2000, 2002, 2014, 2016, 2020, 2022)

ASEAN Cup
- Appearances: 1 (first in 2026)
- Best result: Runners-up (2026)

The Thailand national football team (Thai: ฟุตบอลทีมชาติไทย, RTGS: futbon thim chat thai, pronounced [fút.bɔ̄n tʰīːm t͡ɕʰâːt tʰāj]) represents Thailand in senior international men's football and is controlled by the Football Association of Thailand.

In the regional competition, Thailand is the most successful football team in Southeast Asia (Note: Although Australia has been a member of the ASEAN Football Federation (AFF) since 27 August 2013; in football, the two words "Southeast Asia" are still often used with a geographical connotation.) with 7 ASEAN Championship trophies and nine senior-level gold medals from the Southeast Asian Games, the most of any Southeast Asian country. In higher levels, Thailand achieved the third place in the 1972 AFC Asian Cup where it was the host, and has a total of seven appearances in the AFC Asian Cup so far.

Furthermore, Thailand reached the fourth-place in the 1990 and 1998 Asian Games and participated in the Summer Olympics twice. However, Thailand has failed to obtain higher achievements in the continental and global records. The team obtained their first win in the AFC Asian Cup in 2007 and had to wait 47 years to finally sneak out of the group stage in 2019. Thailand also advanced to the final round of World Cup qualification twice, in 2002 and 2018, but has yet never achieved to qualify for the FIFA World Cup.

== History ==
=== Dynastic establishment (1915–1995) ===
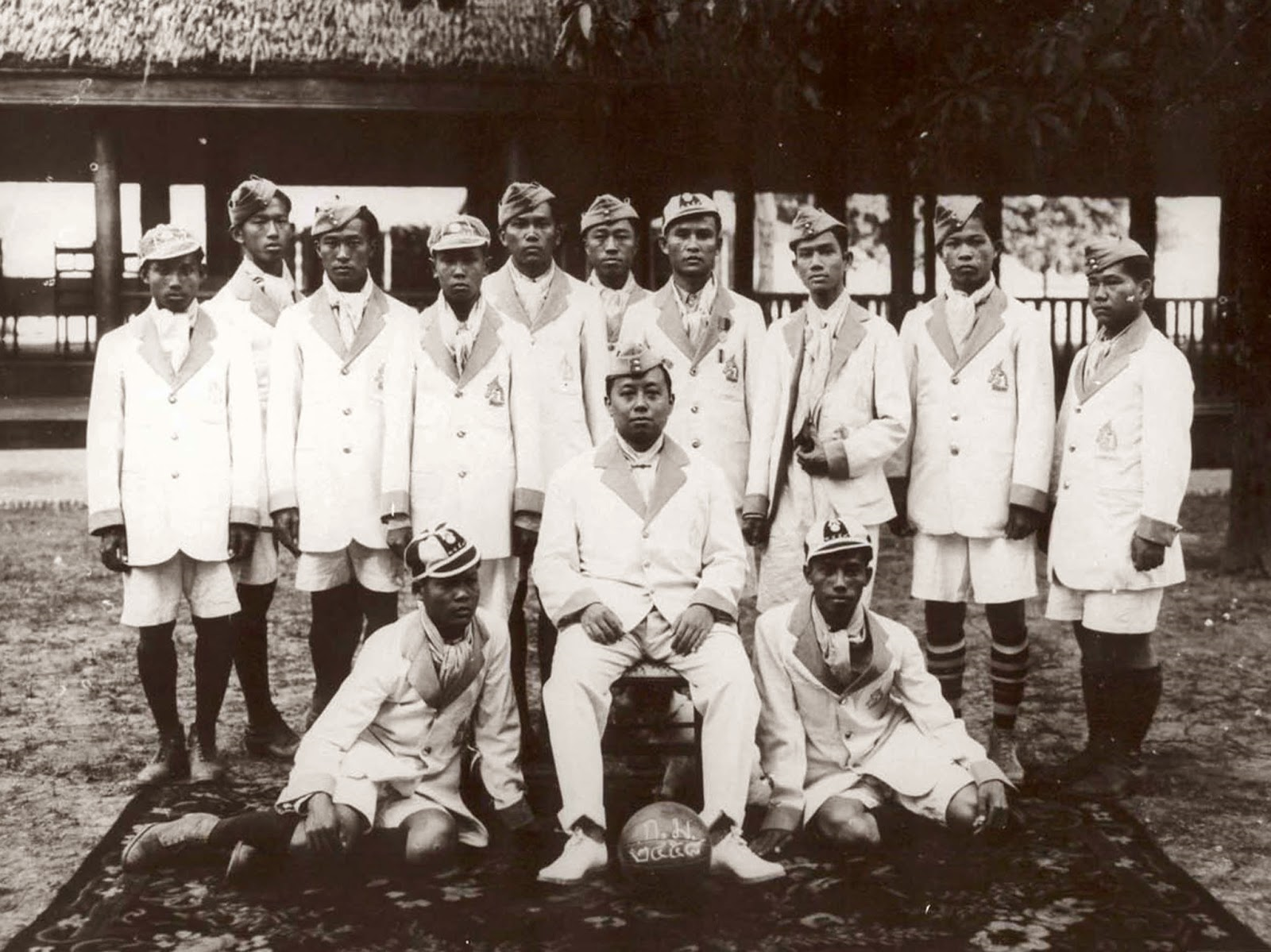
King Vajiravudh, the founder of the Football Association of Thailand

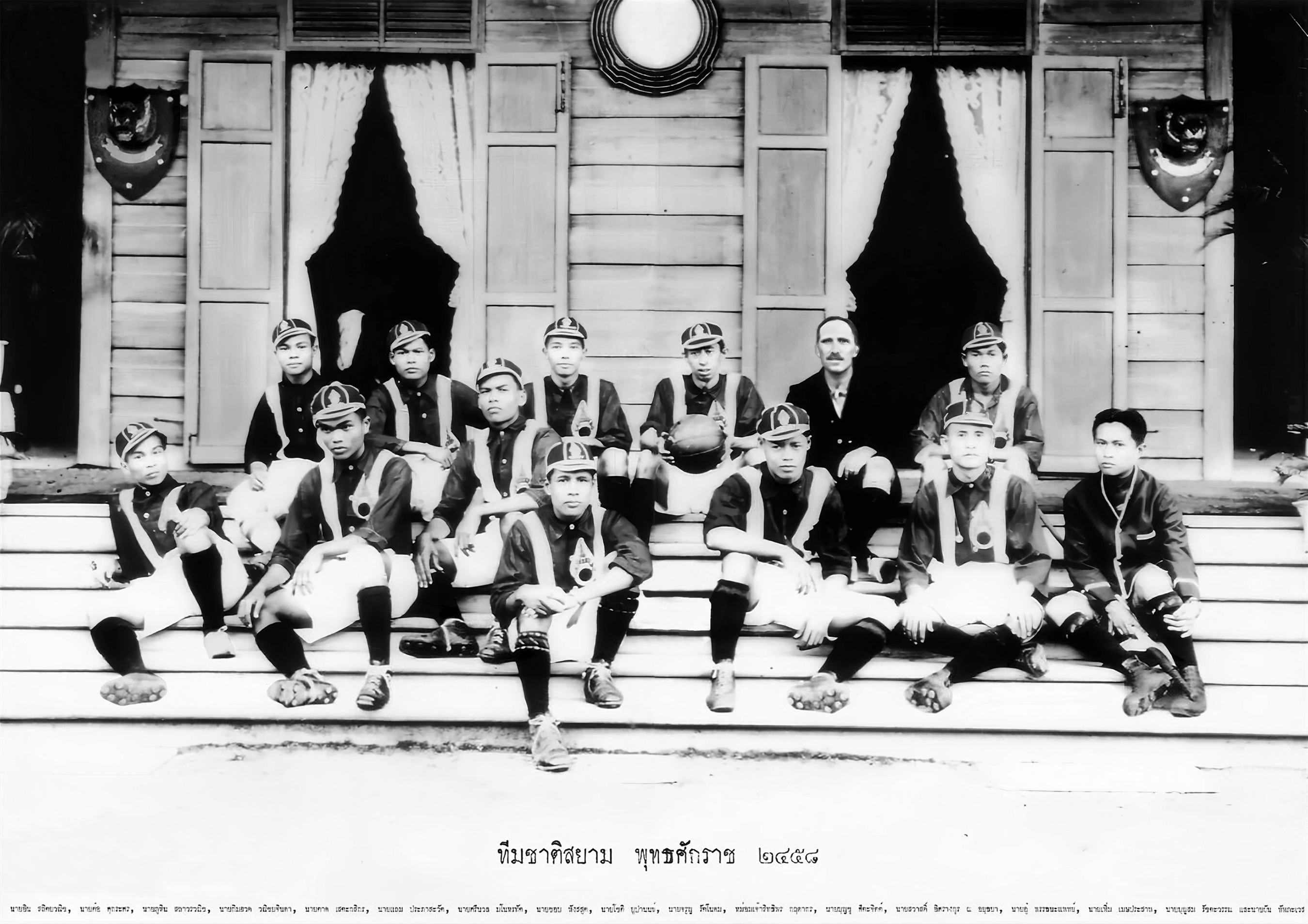
Siam (Thailand) association football squad's pioneers, 1915

The team's predecessor, which operated under the name of Siam, was founded in 1915 and played its first unofficial match against a team of Europeans at the Royal Bangkok Sports Club Stadium on 20 December that year. The team played its first international match in 1930 against the Indochina national team, which included both South Vietnamese and French players.

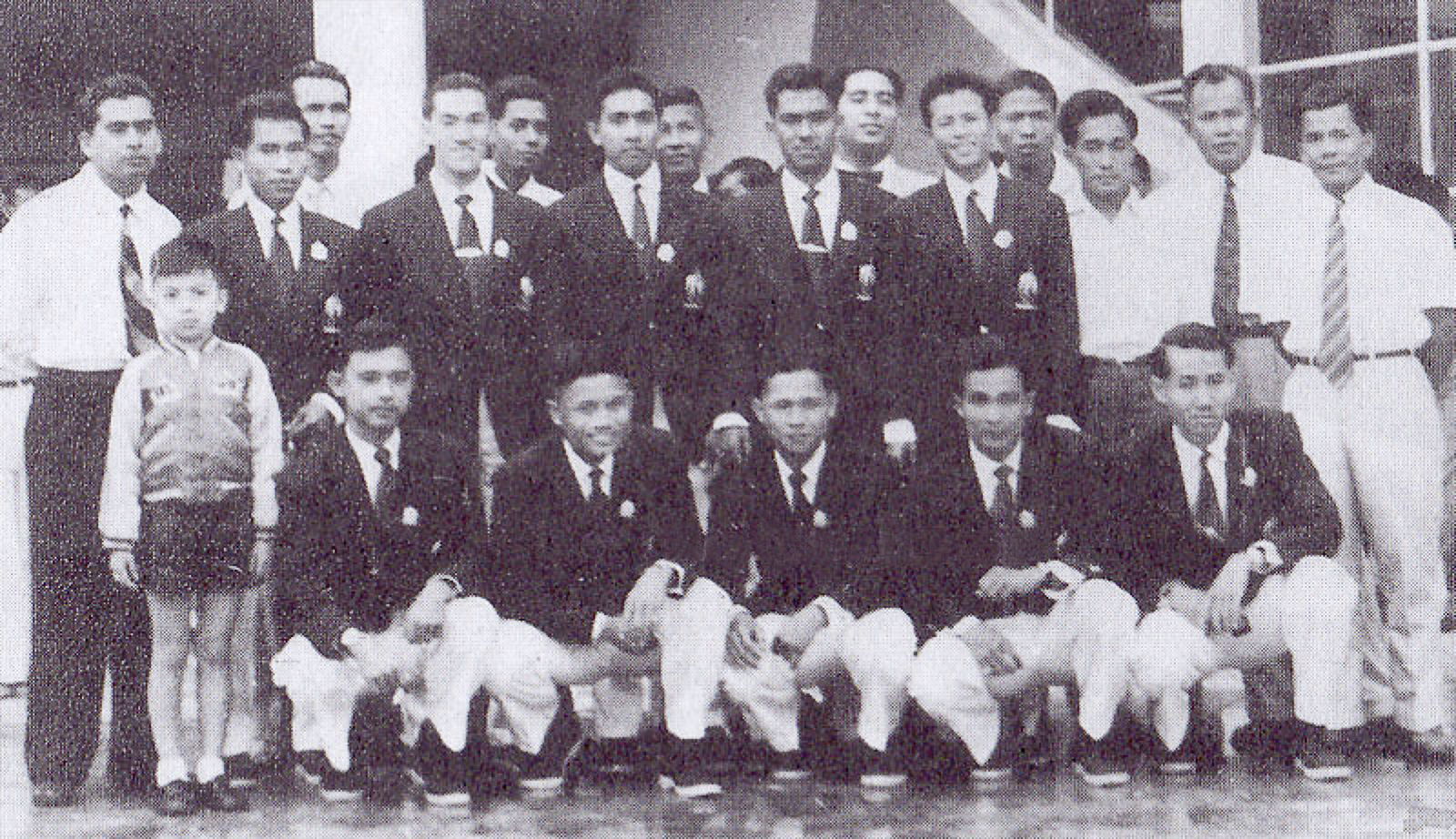
Thailand football members at the 1956 Melbourne Olympics before their biggest defeat by the United Kingdom

Thailand appeared in the 1956 Summer Olympics in Melbourne, where their loss to Great Britain 0–9, was the largest to that point, thus failing to advance to the quarter-finals. In 1959, Thailand as the host won silver medals in the Southeast Asian Peninsular Games after losing 1–3 to South Vietnam in the final. In 1965, Thailand harbored its first distinct title: the very first place in the Southeast Asian Games. They made their second and latest appearance at the Summer Olympics in 1968, losing all three matches by at least 3 goals margin to Bulgaria, Guatemala, and Czechoslovakia hence en route to a first-round exit. Thailand made its first appearance in the FIFA World Cup qualifiers in Seoul on 16 May 1973, but subsequently failed to reach the finals held in 1974.

==== 1992 AFC Asian Cup ====
During the 1992 AFC Asian Cup qualification, Thailand gained a significant success defeating South Korea 2–1 and Bangladesh 1–0 to top the group and qualify to the 1992 AFC Asian Cup making their return to the tournament after a 20-years hiatus. The team's performance at the final tournament was drawing first two matches with Qatar and eventual 3rd place China then losing 0–4 to Saudi Arabia. In 1994, manager Thawatchai Sartjakul assembled a team that has been denounced as the "dream team" with players like Kiatisuk Senamuang, Tawan Sripan and Dusit Chalermsan.

=== Flag bearer of Southeast Asia (1996–2022) ===
In 1996, Thailand defeated Malaysia 1–0 and win the 1996 AFF Championship for the first time. Thailand were favorites to regain the crown in 2007, 2008 and 2012 only to lose tight finals to Singapore and Vietnam respectively.

==== 1996 AFC Asian Cup ====
Thailand also participated in the 1996 AFC Asian Cup where they were drawn in Group B alongside Saudi Arabia, Lebanon, Iran and Iraq. However, Thailand finish last in the group stage thus bowed out from the tournament in the early phase.

The regional 1998 AFF Championship saw Thailand met Indonesia in a match that ill-hearted players from both team deliberately making actions aimed to avoid facing hosts Vietnam in the semi-finals and undergoing technical burden of moving training bases from Ho Chi Minh City to Hanoi. FIFA fined both teams $40,000 for "violating the spirit of the game". Thailand eventually lost the match, inevitably encountered and failed to Vietnam in the semi-finals.

==== 2000 AFC Asian Cup ====
Thailand consecutively qualified to and participated in two AFC Asian Cup final tournaments both held within Western Asia in 1996 and 2000 when their "dream team" was beginning its golden period. Coincidentally in both editions, the team's opponents all came from Western Asia and they are Saudi Arabia, Lebanon, Iran and Iraq, with the latter two share the same group with Thailand twice. In both editions, Thailand made two draws and lost the rest, bottomed the group stage of the first and is the worst third-placed team of the second edition.

The final 2000 AFF Championship match between Thailand and Indonesia, at a sold-out Rajamangala, was almost a carbon copy of their group stage encounter. The War Elephants triumphed 4–1 again with Worrawoot setting up camp at the opponents' goal. The 28-year-old scored twice in their first match and in the final struck a hat-trick in the first 32 minutes. In the final 2002 AFF Cup final, Thailand again met Indonesia (who was now the host) and won the game in penalty shootout despite taking a 2–0 lead.

==== Fourth consecutive AFC Asian Cup appearances ====
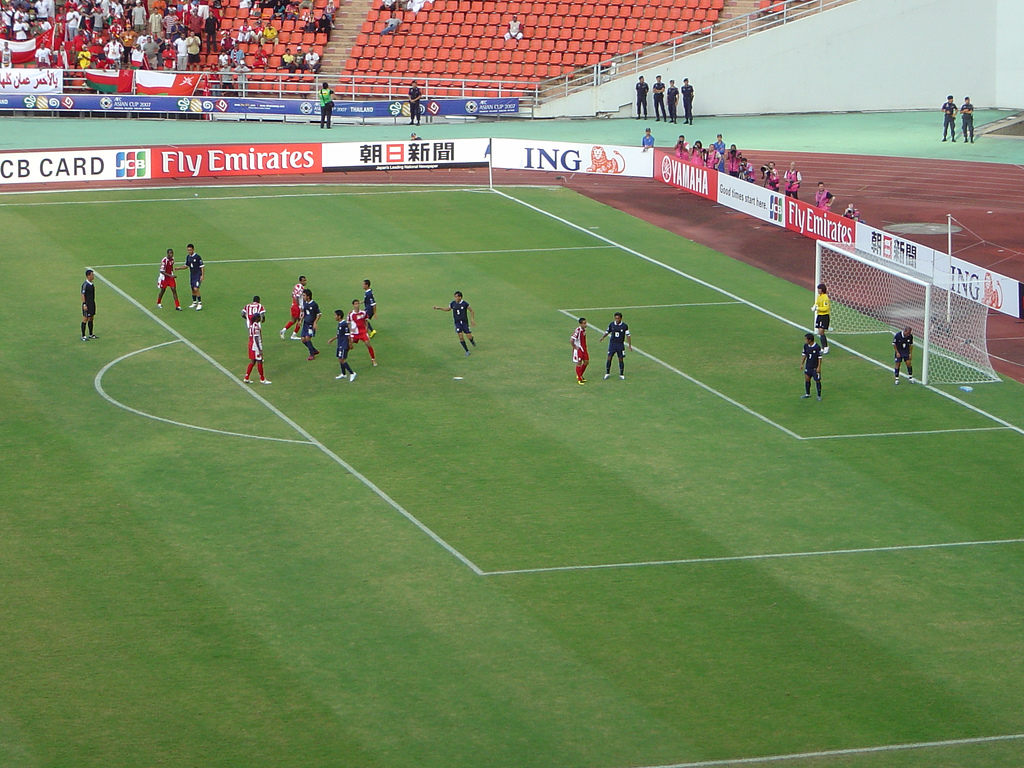
Thailand team against Oman in 2007 AFC Asian Cup Group A match at Rajamangala Stadium

Thailand again qualified to the 2004 AFC Asian Cup and was put into a group with Japan, Iran and debutant Oman. Despite vast experiences in the AFC Asian Cup, the team has yet to show a sign of improvement as they lost all matches and became the worst-performed team in the whole tournament.

The sign of improvement only came in the 2007 AFC Asian Cup when Thailand participated as a well-prepared co-host and was placed with the debutant Australia, Oman, and Iraq. The team managed a draw to Iraq and a historic 2–0 win over Oman. With 4 points ahead, Thailand's chance to qualify for the next round for the first time since 1972 was all but shattered by the likes of Australia in a 0–4 demolition. The tournament witnessed the end of Thailand's recognizable generation with later retirements of Kiatisuk, Tawan, and Pipat.

In September 2008, Thailand signed a four-year contract with the English coach Peter Reid but Reid left his position by mutual consent after only a year in charge as his team fail to clinch the championship of 2008 AFF Championship after 2–3 on aggregate lost to Vietnam in the final.

In September 2009, Bryan Robson agreed to coach Thailand in his first foray into international football management and was contracted to manage the team through to the 2014 FIFA World Cup. In November, Robson celebrated his first competitive match in charge of the team with an away victory against Singapore in a 2011 AFC Asian Cup qualifying group match but then lose to the same opponent back home. Then, two goalless draws with Jordan and Iran in January 2010 and an 0–1 away lost to Iran in March all effectively ended the chance of qualifying for the 2011 AFC Asian Cup. In preparations for the 2010 AFF Championship, Robson led Thailand to victorious run against Singapore and Bob Houghton's India in a series of friendlies. However, when entering the tournament in December, he failed to bring Thailand past group A after managing only draws against Laos and Malaysia and losing to Indonesia. Robson resigned as Thailand's manager on 8 June 2011, citing health problems as the reason and was replaced by Winfried Schäfer, who would be the ninth German person to coach the Thailand team.

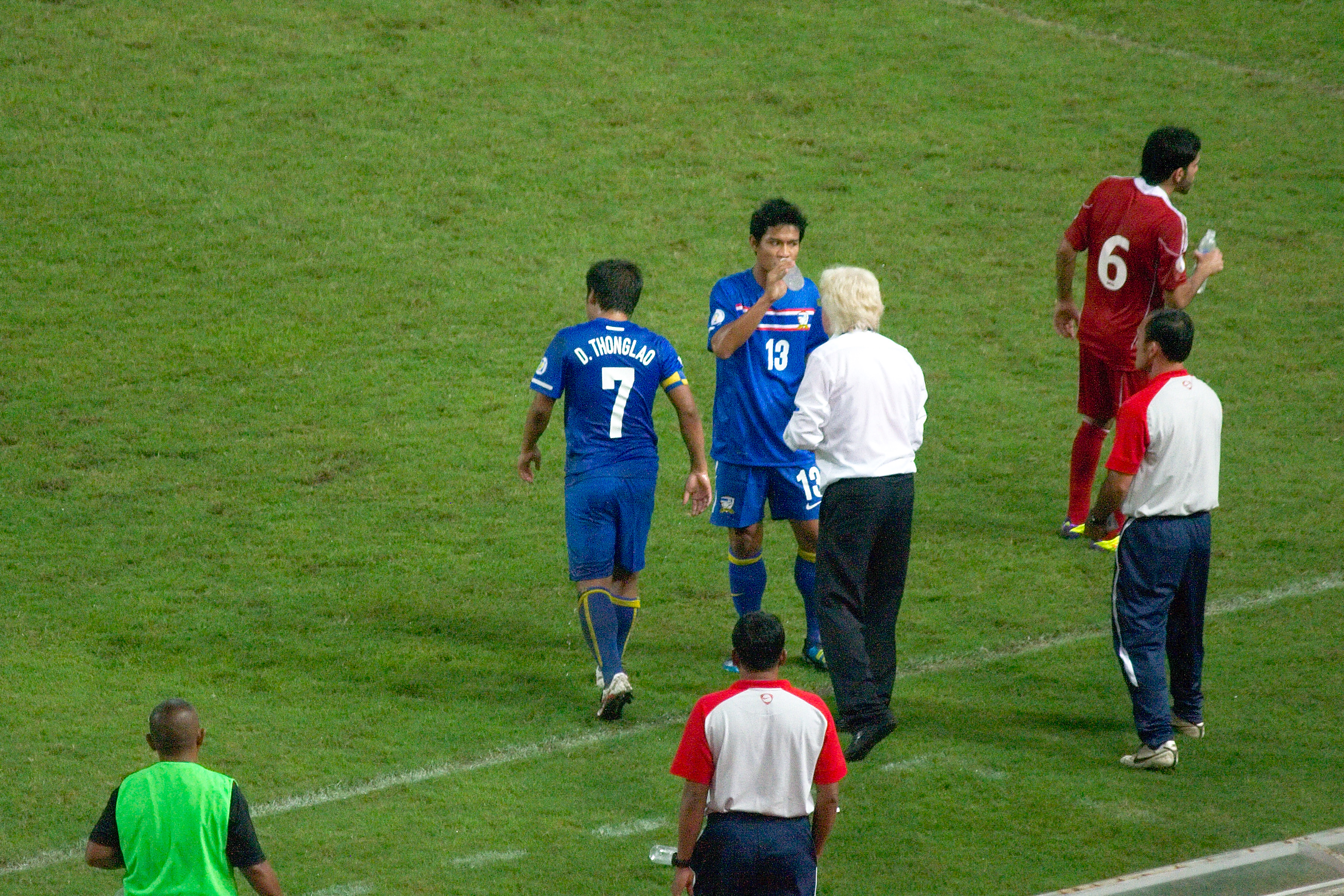
Thailand's head coach Winfried Schäfer talking to players during the 2014 FIFA World Cup qualification match against Oman at the Rajamangala Stadium in 2011

The new coach called up starlets for the 2014 FIFA World Cup qualifiers and have the starting set of matches losing minimal to Australia, defeating Oman 3–0 and drawing Saudi Arabia but did not make it after losing to these teams altogether in the second set. In the 2012 AFF Championship, Thailand topped their group and surpassed Malaysia in the semi-finals but handed the crown to Singapore in the finals. In the 2015 AFC Asian Cup qualification, Thailand showed a setback with its defensive frailties exposed by Middle Eastern rivals (Iran, Kuwait, Lebanon) when losing all 6 games in the qualifiers, conceding 21 goals in the process.

In June 2013, Schäfer canceled his contract. The FA of Thailand appointed the former player Kiatisuk Senamuang as the new caretaker coach for the national team. His first ride was a friendly against China on 15 June, which Thailand surprisingly won 5–1.

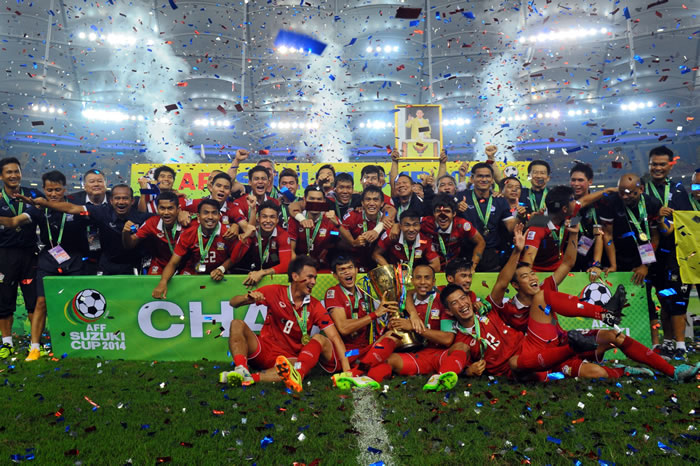
Thailand team celebrated after winning the 2014 AFF Championship at the Bukit Jalil National Stadium in Malaysia

In 2014, Thailand ended a 12-year drought of the AFF Championship title from the late goals by Charyl Chappuis and Chanathip Songkrasin which gave them a dramatic 4–3 aggregate victory over Malaysia in the second leg of the finals in Bukit Jalil. The team did not lose any match up until the second leg of the finals and often featured a tiki-taka playing style, for instance including 27 consecutive passes during the first leg of the finals against Malaysia. Kiatisuk Senamuang consequently became the first person to win the AFF Championship as both a player and a coach. Thailand succeeded in protecting AFF Championship reign two years later in 2016, defeating Indonesia 3–2 aggregately despite losing the first leg.

In 2015, evasion fueled hope for both the players and Thailand fans of finally reaching the World Cup tournament and tension is mounting as the national team commenced AFC's second round for 2018 FIFA World Cup qualification. Teerasil Dangda, Thailand's renowned striker, rejoined the rank of the national team after his loan with UD Almería ended earlier. Drawn in Group F along with Chinese Taipei, Iraq and Vietnam, who Thailand played its first match home against on 24 May and can only be won by a victory goal from a shot 20 yards away. They played a much easier match at the same opponent's home soil, winning 3–0. Thailand won both matches against Chinese Taipei and drew 2–2 both matches against Iraq, allowing them to qualify for the next round as group F winners. In the last round, Kiatisuk's men shared the same group with Australia, Japan, Saudi Arabia, UAE along with previous opponent, Iraq. Again, Thailand was eliminated without winning a match and recorded only two points out of ten matches.

==== Southeast Asia all-time record ====
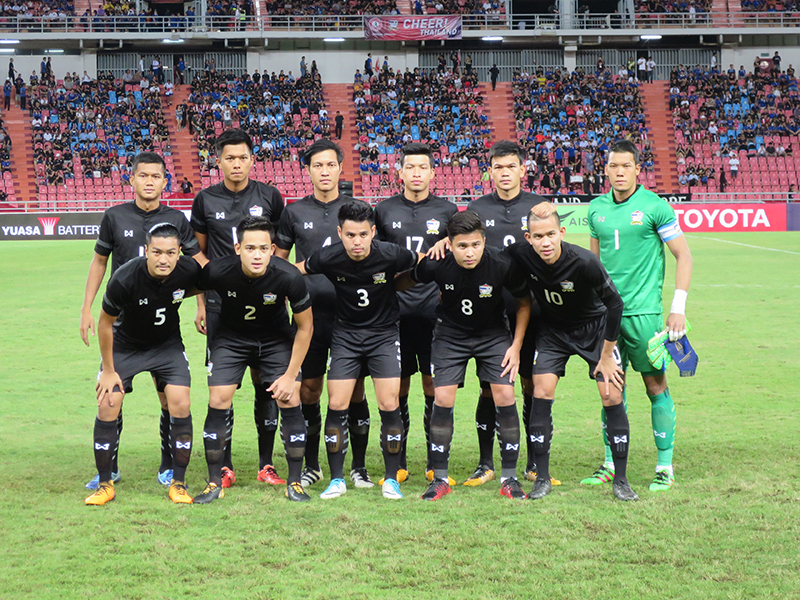
The Thai team at the 2017 King's Cup, wearing black to mourn the death of King Bhumibol Adulyadej

In the 2016 AFF Championship, Thailand was drawn in Group A alongside Indonesia, Philippines and Singapore. Thailand went on to win all of their group stage games thus facing off against Myanmar in the semi-finals where Thailand would battered them 6–0 on aggregate to advance to the final. In the final, Thailand faced off against Indonesia where they lost 2–1 against the opponent in Bogor but comeback to a 2–0 win bringing the aggregate on 3–2 thus seeing Thailand won their fifth AFF Championship title.

Since taking over the administration by Somyot Poompanmoung, FA Thailand aims to drive men's national football team to be one of the leading teams in Asia by which there are concrete 20 years development plans and preparations. After the elimination from World Cup qualifiers, Kiatisuk Senamuang resigned and Thailand appointed Serbian head coach Milovan Rajevac. Under Rajevac, however, Thailand failed to defend its AFF Championship title in 2018 when losing Malaysia in the semi-finals by the away goals rule.

==== 2019 AFC Asian Cup ====
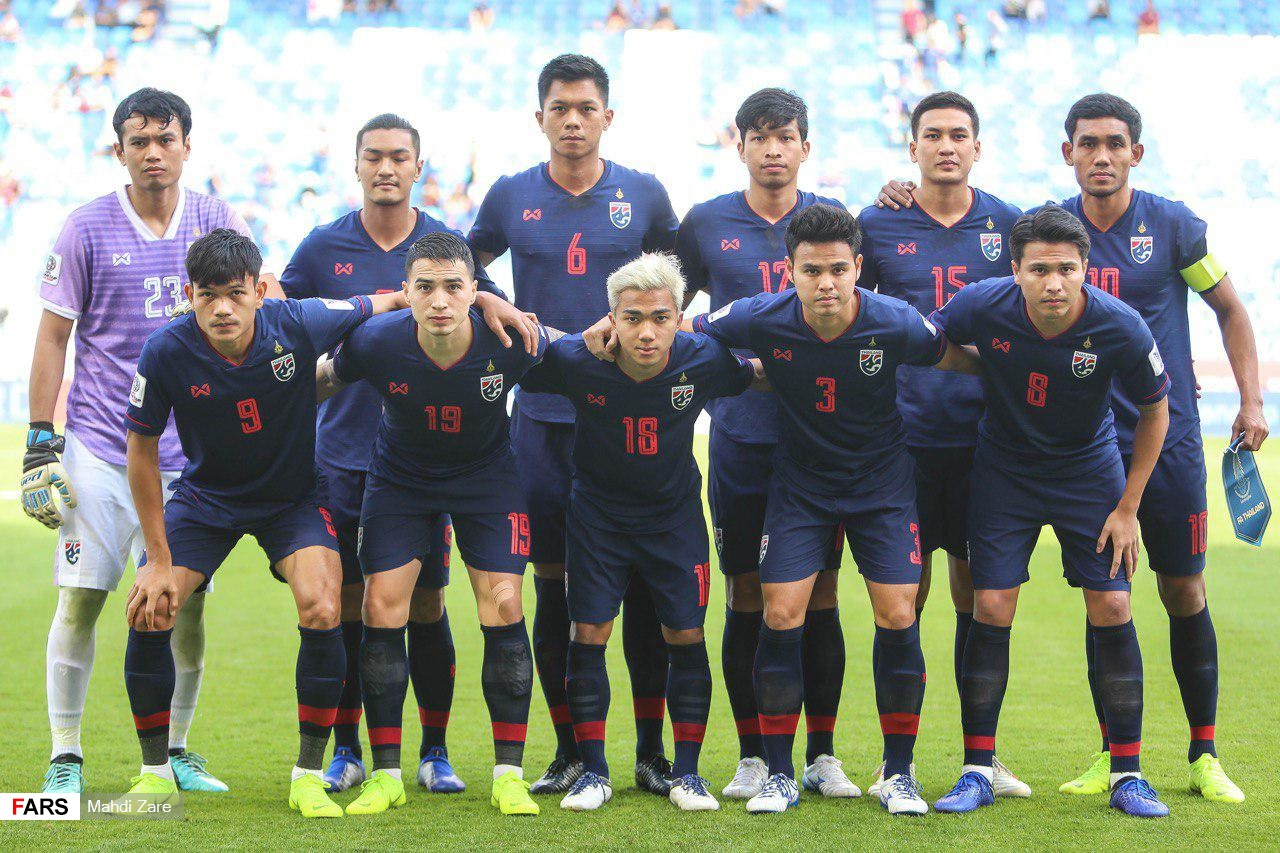
Thai players lining up at the 2019 AFC Asian Cup

Ahead of 2019 AFC Asian Cup, Thailand was drawn into group A together with the host UAE, Bahrain and India. Rajevac oversaw Thailand in the commencing 1–4 loss to India. The Serbian coach was sacked and his assistant, Sirisak Yodyardthai became the interim coach on 7 January. Sirisak guided Thailand to a 1–0 win over Bahrain and a 1–1 draw with the host UAE, enough to move on to the knockout stage of the AFC Asian Cup for the first time in 47 years. Their success was greeted with congratulation from the FA. Thailand encountered China in the round of sixteen, taking an early lead but eventually lost 2–1 as China make their decisive respond.

After finishing in the fourth place of 2019 King's Cup and losing the rival Vietnam in that tournament, Sirisak had resigned and FA Thailand appointed the Japanese coach Akira Nishino, who had brought Japan to the round of 16 of 2018 FIFA World Cup, for replacement. This was the first-ever Asian coach becoming Thailand's head coach. The team was drawn into group G of the second round of 2022 FIFA World Cup qualification with other three Southeast Asian rivals: Vietnam, Malaysia, Indonesia; along with United Arab Emirates. Despite defeating Indonesia 3–0 and UAE 2–1, Thailand failed to revenge Vietnam when getting goalless draws in both legs, while losing Malaysia 1–2 in Bukit Jalil. With these results, Thailand could only get the third place in group G after five qualifying matches. After a one-year disruption due to COVID-19 pandemic, Thailand and other teams in group G had to play their remaining matches in Dubai, UAE. However, the team suffered a huge loss of key players when Chanathip Songkrasin was injured, while Teerasil Dangda and Theerathon Bunmathan refused to participate the qualification due to various reasons. Without these three players, Thailand showed a poor performance in Dubai - drawn the bottom place team Indonesia 2–2, then lost the UAE 1–3 and Malaysia 0–1, respectively; which eventually pushed the team down to the fourth place of the group G. Nishino did not come back to Thailand to explain the team's failure, but unilaterally returning to Japan, which made FA Thailand appoint Anurak Srikerd as the caretaker and consider sacking Nishino in upcoming days. On 29 July 2021, shortly after Nishino came back to Thailand, FA Thailand decided to terminate the contract with Nishino.

==== Fruitful victories under Alexandré Pölking (2021–2023) ====
On 28 September 2021, Brazilian Alexandré Pölking was appointed as the head coach of the Thailand national team, replacing Akira Nishino. Pölking's first task was the 2020 AFF Championship in December 2021 held in Singapore. Between 5 December 2021 and 1 January 2022, Polking accomplished the very task as he managed the War Elephants to win 6–2 on aggregate after being held to a 2–2 second-leg draw by Indonesia, guiding Thailand to win the AFF Championship for the sixth time. In the 2022 AFF Championship, Thailand defended their title on 16 January 2023, winning the tournament by a 3–2 aggregate score in the two-legged final against Vietnam to secure their seventh title.

In October 2023, Thailand embarked on a European tour playing two friendlies against Georgia and Estonia and with star players like Chanathip Songkrasin, Nicholas Mickelson and Ekanit Panya injured and club team refused to release Teerasil Dangda and Theerathon Bunmathan, Supachok Sarachat, Sarach Yooyen, Pansa Hemviboon for international duties, Thailand have to relies on inexperienced international players and also giving the opportunity for new young players a chance to touched up for the future international matches. On 12 October 2023, Thailand suffered their worst defeat in the 21st century losing against Georgia 8–0 at the Mikheil Meskhi Stadium. In the next match against Estonia on 17 October, Jakkapan Praisuwan equalised it for Thailand for a hard fought 1–1 draw at the Lilleküla Stadium.

==== 2023 AFC Asian Cup ====
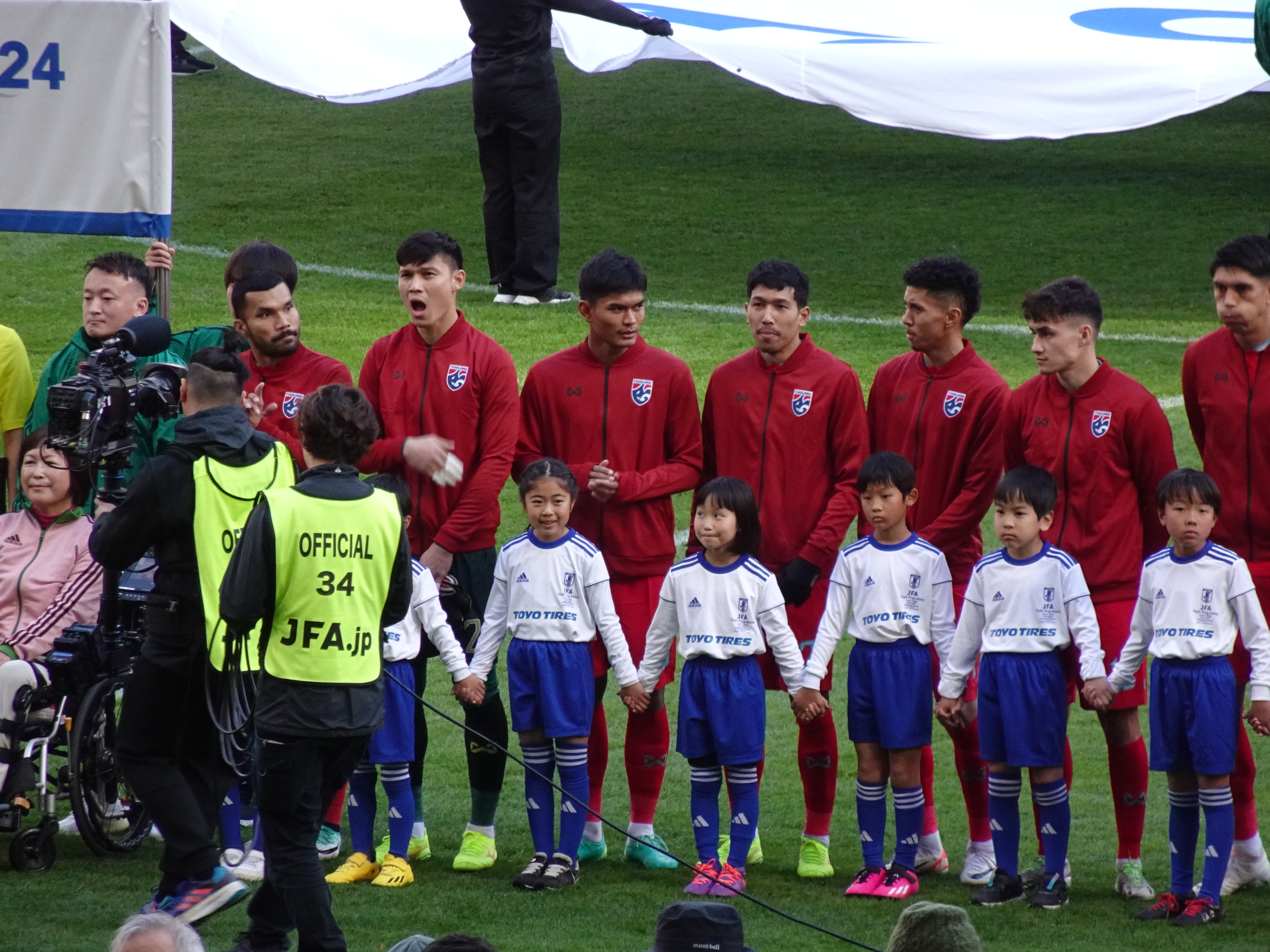
Thailand vs Japan on New Year’s Day Match at Toyo Tires Cup in 2024

After a hurried attempt, Japanese manager Masatada Ishii was announced as Thailand's temporarily new head coach, with a contract lasted until the end of the 2023 AFC Asian Cup as he faced a daunting prospect of reviving the lacklustre Thai side to reach continental level. His first match, a friendly against his homeland Japan, saw Thailand thrashed 5–0 in the second half after an impressive first half display, increased negative feelings among Thai fans as the War Elephants faced a huge challenge in group F at the Asian Cup, with Saudi Arabia, Kyrgyzstan and Oman on the same boat.

However, Thailand started their AFC Asian Cup campaign with a 2–0 win against Kyrgyzstan, marking Thailand's first win in an AFC Asian Cup opening match. Thailand's next match was against Oman, who performed well over the past three years and whose manager, Branko Ivanković, who had never lost to Thailand in his coaching career. However, Thailand resolutely defended throughout the match, resulting in a goalless draw, giving Thailand four points and an early progression to the knockout stage. Thailand would then go on to produce its most famous game in their modern AFC Asian Cup history against Saudi Arabia in the final group stage match, including a famous penalty save by Saranon Anuin resulting in another scoreless draw, ending their losing streak that started in 2012 to the same opponent and, for the first time ever, Thailand gained a shutout record in the AFC Asian Cup group stage. However, Thailand failed to end their knockout stage losing streak record in the AFC Asian Cup, losing 2–1 to Uzbekistan in the round of 16 to equal their 2019 run. Despite this exit, Thailand's performance in the tournament earned the team significant praise, and Masatada Ishii was appointed on a permanent basis, with the aim to help Thailand to qualify for the third round of the 2026 FIFA World Cup qualification and the 2027 AFC Asian Cup.

==== 2024 ASEAN Championship ====
In the 2024 ASEAN Championship, Thailand was drawn to first group against Malaysia, Singapore, Cambodia and the qualified team in the qualification-Timor-Leste. They finished the group with 4 wins-included their biggest win (10-0 against Timor-Leste) during the tournament, conquered top 1 in the group. In the semi-final, they met Philippines. In the first leg, they lost to Philippines by 1–2. But after 3 days later, they won Philippines in the second leg by 3–1 after extra time, booked a place to the final. In the final, they lost 1-2 in the first leg and 2-3 in the second leg against Vietnam, this also marked the first time they lost all two legs in the final in ASEAN Championship. And after this tournament, they only received the runner-up.

==== 2026 FIFA World Cup qualification ====
The 2026 FIFA World Cup qualification saw Thailand drawn in group C against South Korea, China and Singapore, with the target to be winning the second place to advance to the final round. However, Thailand would get off to a disastrous start, flopping at home to China 2–1 despite opened the scoring by Sarach Yooyen. This home loss ultimately sealed Pölking's fate, despite a 3–1 away victory over Singapore which moved Thailand up to second place; with the Brazilian sacked for failing to meet expectations.

After the 2023 AFC Asian Cup, Thailand played two more qualifiers, both against South Korea, in March 2024. On 21 March 2024, Thailand managed to earn a surprise 1–1 draw in front of 64,912 fans in Seoul, but would later lose 3–0 at home to the same opponents. Thailand would end their qualification campaign in June undefeated, notably with a 1–1 draw away to China, before managing to overcome Singapore 3–1; yet their inability to convert scoring opportunities, as well as giving up a late goal in their draw with China, sealed Thailand's fate. The team did not advance to the next phase and finished behind China based on head-to-head results, as both teams ended with the same goal difference and points total.

==== 2026 ASEAN Championship ====
In the 2026 ASEAN Championship, Thailand was placed in Group B, which contained Malaysia, Myanmar, Philippines, and Laos. Thailand secured all four victories and advanced past the group stage. The semi-finals saw Thailand win 4–3 on aggregate over Singapore, before the final saw them lose 2–4 on aggregate to Vietnam.

==== 2026 FIFA ASEAN Cup ====
In September 2026, Thailand played in the inaugural FIFA ASEAN Cup of the 2026 edition. Thailand were drawn alongside Vietnam, Philippines and Pakistan in Group B. In their opening match, Thailand went on to demolished Pakistan 4–0 before getting an crucial 2–0 win over Vietnam in their second game. On the final matchday of the group stage, Thailand lost 1–2 to Philippines.

In the final on 5 October, Thailand faced Indonesia. This match finished 2–2 after extra time before Thailand lost the penalty shoot-out 2–4, with Sarach Yooyen's shot hitting the post and Nattapong Sayriya's shot being saved by Indonesian goalkeeper Emil Audero. Combined with their failure in the ASEAN Championship, 2026 became a year where Thailand fell short in two ASEAN football tournament finals. If also combined with the U-23 team's defeat at two SEA Games (2023 and 2025) and the national team's failure in the 2024 ASEAN Championship, this defeat would mark Thailand's fifth consecutive one in ASEAN football tournament finals since they won the 2022 AFF Championship.

== Team image ==
=== Colours ===
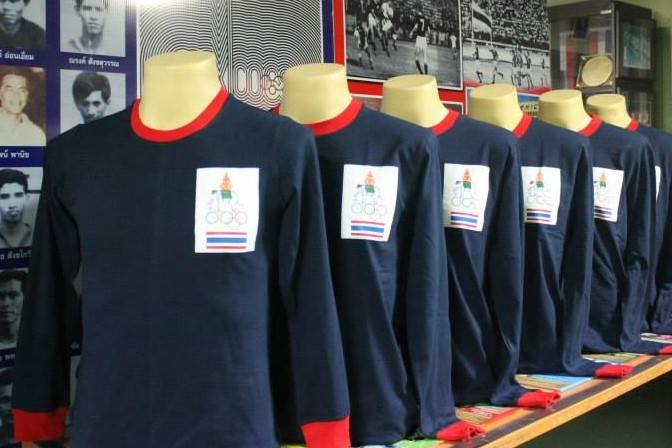
Thailand national team vintage 1968 Summer Olympics shirt

In older days, the primary kits worn are all red.

Thailand national team used to play with a kit made by local provider FBT. This contract lasted until June 2007.

In July 2007, Nike became kit providers, and from October that year, the team played in an all-yellow home kit in honour of King Bhumibol Adulyadej's 80th birthday (yellow being the royal color), having used two other yellow kits in friendlies against China on 16 May 2007 and Qatar on 2 July 2007.

From October 2012 through 2016, Nike was replaced by Grand Sport in a deal worth 96M baht (3.1M USD). The new home kit of Thailand reverted to all-red and the away kit to all-blue. However, the order was reversed from the 2014 AFF Championship onward.

In September 2016, the national team signed a four-year contract with Warrix Sports to be their kit provider from 2017. On 4 January 2017, the new provider introduced a new pair of Thailand kits that was all black home and all white away, honouring their late King Bhumibol for a year after his passing, with black and white being the traditional Thai colors of mourning.

In March 2018, Warrix returned Thailand to the all-blue first, all-red second kits with an addition of a white-black third kit.

In December 2018, a new, darker version of blue, red kits and an all white third kit were presented for the 2019 AFC Asian Cup campaign and the rest of 2019. For the 2019 King's Cup in May, Warrix released the kit consisting of a yellow shirt with white shorts and socks – yellow reportedly being the favorite color of the newly crowned King Maha Vajiralongkorn.

Thailand wore black again in November 2025 after the passing of Queen Sirikit.

=== Kit sponsorship ===
Kit suppliers	Period
(Germany) Adidas	1986
(Thailand) FBT	1989
(Thailand) Grand Sport	1991
(Thailand) FBT	1992–1994
(Thailand) Grand Sport	1995–1996
(Thailand) Malance	1996-1997
(Thailand) Grand Sport	1997
(Thailand) FBT	1998–2007
(United States) Nike	2007–2012
(Thailand) Grand Sport	2012–2017
(Thailand) Warrix	2017–present

=== Rivalries ===
==== Notable rivalries ====
Thailand has rivalries with Malaysia, Vietnam and Myanmar. These rivalries are rooted in geographical proximity.

Opponent	GP	W	D	L	GF	GA	GD	Win %	Details
Malaysia	108	33	34	41	147	153	−6	30.56	
Vietnam	62	23	13	26	84	90	−6	37.10	Matches
Myanmar	56	25	15	16	106	73	+33	44.64	

==== Malaysia ====
Malaysia is Thailand's most frequently faced opponent, the two teams having played each other 108 times. Before Malaysia fell into football scandal that weakened the country's football development from the 1990s to 2018, Malaysia was one of Thailand's most annoying and difficult opponents in the region. Despite the football scandal, Thailand have not defeated the Malaysians on their home turf since 1971. Thailand have better records in international football competitions than the Malaysians.

==== Vietnam ====
Thailand's rivalry with Vietnam has developed differently over time. During the time of South Vietnam and North Vietnam, Thailand had a poorer performance, winning only 5 of 28 matches against the South Vietnamese. However, when Vietnam rejoined international football in 1991, Thailand established a period of dominance until 2016, winning 14 out of 21 matches. Since late 2017, the rivalry has become more closely contested, with Thailand recording 3 wins, 5 draws, and 4 losses in their last 12 meetings (as of 2026). Overall, the record since 1956 remains relatively balanced for both sides.

==== Myanmar ====
When Myanmar was still a football power, it was Thailand's first-ever rival, owned by the history of the Burmese–Siamese wars which led to a nationalist fervor among Thai fans with its desire to beat the Burmese. But with Myanmar weakened following the reign of Ne Win and Junta, Thailand improved and since 1983, holds an undefeated streak over its western rival. The rivalry today only serves mostly in the memoir of Burmese fans who are nostalgic to an era when Myanmar was still a leading football power, while for some Thai fans, they have more important opponents to concentrate on.

=== Home stadium ===
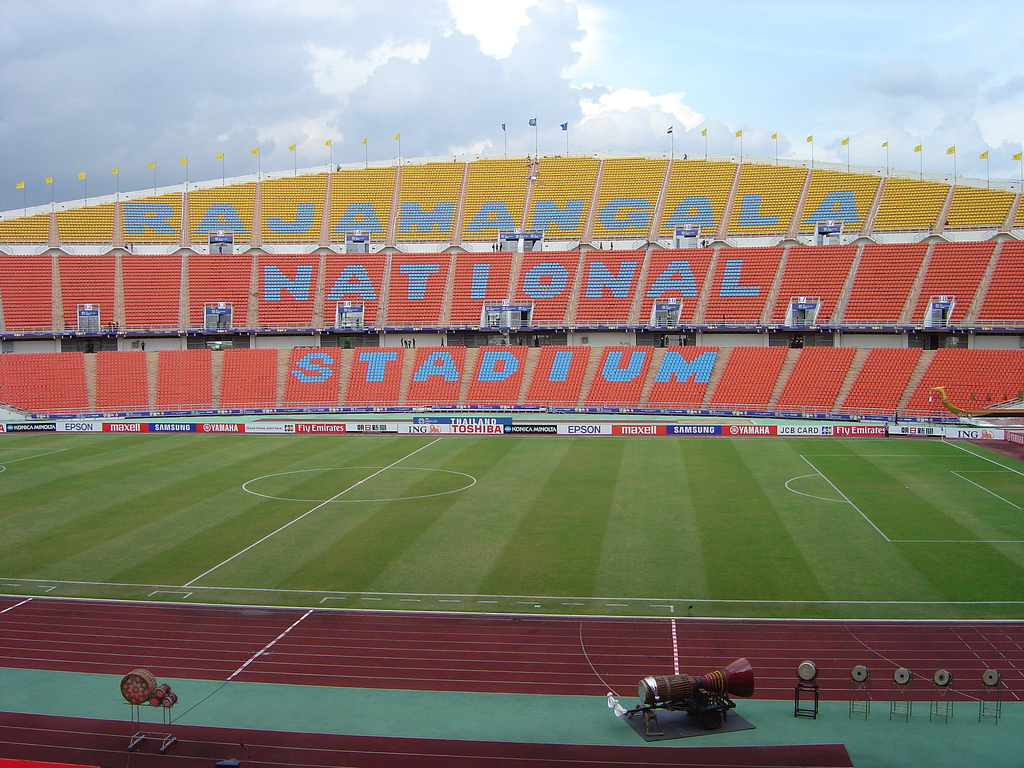
Rajamangala Stadium in 2007

Most of Thailand home matches took place in Rajamangala Stadium in Bang Kapi District of Bangkok. Built for the 1998 Asian Games, the stadium is the largest sporting facility in Thailand with a capacity of 49,749 making it the largest stadium in the country. The stadium has hosted matches in major international competitions, as well as qualifiers and friendly matches involving the national team.

Thailand has also occasionally played a few of their home matches at other stadiums across the country, particularly when Rajamangala Stadium is unavailable or another venue is selected for a specific fixture which is mostly held at the Supachalasai Stadium, 700th Anniversary Stadium, 80th Birthday Stadium, Thammasat Stadium, Chang Arena, True BG Stadium or Thunderdome Stadium.

== Results and fixtures ==
The following is a list of match results in the last 12 months, as well as any future matches that have been scheduled.

Win Draw Loss Fixture

=== 2026 ===
31 March 2027 AFC Asian Cup Q	Thailand	2–1	Turkmenistan	Bangkok, Thailand
19:30 UTC+7	Suphanan 14'; Bihr 89'	Report	Çaryýew 60'	Stadium: Rajamangala Stadium; Attendance: 37,373; Referee: Shen Yinhao (China)

5 June Friendly	Thailand	2–2	Kuwait	Pathum Thani, Thailand
19:30 UTC+7	Seksan 42'; Kritsada 45+4'		Majed 48'; Al-Rashidi 69'	Stadium: True BG Stadium; Attendance: 5,420; Referee: Nazmi Nasaruddin (Malaysia)

9 June Friendly	China	0–0	Thailand	Hangzhou, China
19:35 UTC+8		Report		Stadium: Huanglong Sports Center; Attendance: 27,005; Referee: Ko Hyung-jin (South Korea)

25 July 2026 ASEAN Championship GS	Laos	0–5	Thailand	Vientiane, Laos
20:00 UTC+7		Report	Teerasak 11'; Kakana 27', 59'; Yotsakorn 49'; Sarach 52'	Stadium: New Laos National Stadium; Attendance: 7,678; Referee: Choi Hyun-jai (South Korea)

1 August 2026 ASEAN Championship GS	Thailand	2–0	Malaysia	Bangkok, Thailand
20:00 UTC+7	Yotsakorn 38' (pen.); Teerasak 56'	Report		Stadium: Rajamangala Stadium; Attendance: 16,037; Referee: Kim Woo-sung (South Korea)

4 August 2026 ASEAN Championship GS	Philippines	0–1	Thailand	Capas, Philippines
21:00 UTC+8		Report	Waris 84'	Stadium: New Clark City Athletics Stadium; Attendance: 2,786; Referee: Yusuke Ohashi (Japan)

8 August 2026 ASEAN Championship GS	Thailand	2–0	Myanmar	Bangkok, Thailand
20:00 UTC+7	Worachit 11' (pen.); Jehhanafee 52' (pen.)	Report		Stadium: Rajamangala Stadium; Attendance: 13,026; Referee: Yusuke Ohashi (Japan)

15 August 2026 ASEAN Championship SF1	Singapore	1–3	Thailand	Kallang, Singapore
21:00 UTC+8	Ilhan 84'	Report	Teerasak 13', 26'; Seksan 51'	Stadium: Jalan Besar Stadium; Attendance: 5,358; Referee: Mahmood Al Majarafi (Oman)

18 August 2026 ASEAN Championship SF2	Thailand	1–2 (4–3 agg.)	Singapore	Bangkok, Thailand
20:00 UTC+7	Kakana 61' (pen.)	Report	H. Stewart 45'; Pansa 65' (o.g.)	Stadium: Rajamangala Stadium; Attendance: 10,802; Referee: Kim Woo-sung (South Korea)

22 August 2026 ASEAN Championship Final1	Thailand	0–2	Vietnam	Bangkok, Thailand
20:00 UTC+7		Report	Nguyễn Hai Long 62'; Nguyễn Quang Hải 69'	Stadium: Rajamangala Stadium; Attendance: 26,415; Referee: Sami Al-Ismail (Saudi Arabia)

26 August 2026 ASEAN Championship Final2	Vietnam	2–2 (4–2 agg.)	Thailand	Hanoi, Vietnam
20:00 UTC+7	Chatchai 52' (o.g.); Wanchai 90+3' (o.g.)	Report	Yotsakorn 12'; Wanchai 85'	Stadium: Mỹ Đình National Stadium; Attendance: 38,646; Referee: Ahmed Eisa Darwish (United Arab Emirates)

26 September 2026 FIFA ASEAN Cup GS	Pakistan	0–4	Thailand	Bandung, Indonesia
16:00 UTC+7		Report	Teerasak 31', 84'; Soonsup-Bell 41'; Zeb 64' (o.g.)	Stadium: Si Jalak Harupat Stadium; Referee: Kim Hee-gon (South Korea)

29 September 2026 FIFA ASEAN Cup GS	Thailand	2–0	Vietnam	Bandung, Indonesia
19:30 UTC+7	Sarach 10'; Chaiyaphon 90+2'	Report		Stadium: Si Jalak Harupat Stadium; Referee: Ben Abraham (Australia)

2 October 2026 FIFA ASEAN Cup GS	Thailand	1–2	Philippines	Bandung, Indonesia
16:00 UTC+7	Iklas 55'	Report	Kristensen 3', 68'	Stadium: Si Jalak Harupat Stadium; Referee: Razlan Joffri Ali (Malaysia)

5 October 2026 FIFA ASEAN Cup Final	Indonesia	2–2 (a.e.t.) (4–2 p)	Thailand	Jakarta, Indonesia
20:00 UTC+7	James 84'; Baggott 116'	Report	Iklas 87'; Peeradol 111'	Stadium: Gelora Bung Karno Stadium; Attendance: 70,098; Referee: Akhrol Riskullaev (Uzbekistan)
	Penalties
	Diks (penalty scored); James (penalty scored); Baggott (penalty scored); Pattynama (penalty scored)		(penalty scored) Bihr; (penalty scored) Waris; (penalty missed) Sarach; (penalty missed) Sayriya

14 November 2026 King's Cup	Thailand	6–0	Brunei	Sisaket, Thailand
19:30 UTC+7	Ishyra 3' (o.g.); Yotsakorn 60', 74', 80'; Weidersjö 51'; Anan 67'	Report		Stadium: Sisaket Provincial Stadium; Attendance: 14,319; Referee: Koki Nagamine (Japan)

17 November 2026 King's Cup	Tajikistan	0–3	Thailand	Sisaket, Thailand
19:30 UTC+7		Report	Supachok 40'; Teerasak 49', 75'	Stadium: Sisaket Provincial Stadium; Attendance: 17,426; Referee: Koji Takasaki (Japan)

=== 2027 ===
AFC Asian Cup	Qatar	v	Thailand	Riyadh, Saudi Arabia
--:-- UTC+3				Stadium: King Saud University Stadium

AFC Asian Cup	Thailand	v	Japan	Riyadh, Saudi Arabia
--:-- UTC+3				Stadium: Al Shabab Stadium

AFC Asian Cup	Thailand	v	Indonesia	Jeddah, Saudi Arabia
--:-- UTC+3				Stadium: King Abdullah Sports City Stadium

== Coaching staff ==
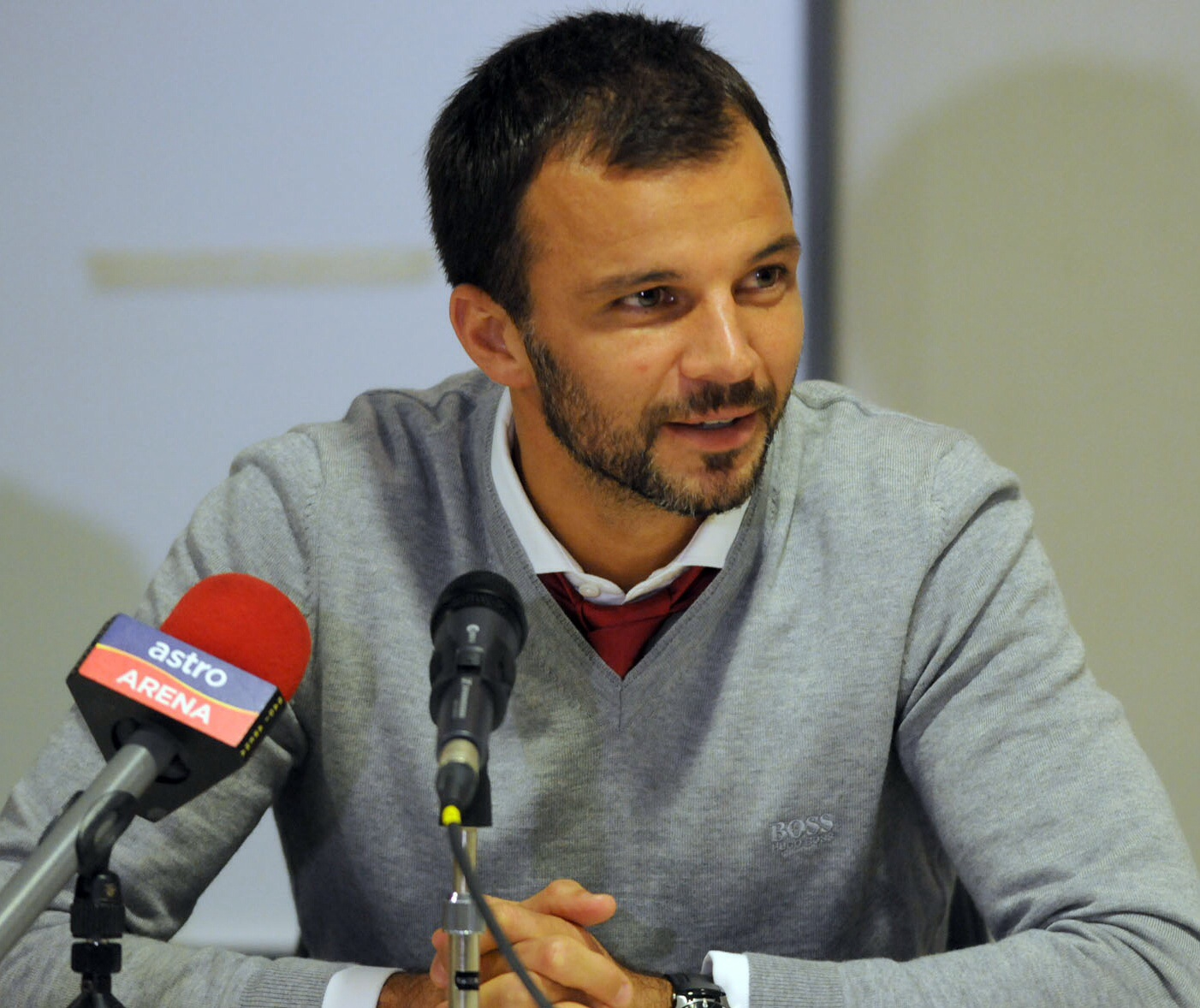
Anthony Hudson is the current head coach

Position	Name
Technical director	Vacant
Team manager	(Thailand) Chalermchai Mahagitsiri
Head coach	Anthony Hudson
Assistant coach	Kane Wintersgill; Peter Taylor
Goalkeeping coach	(Thailand) Kawin Thamsatchanan
Fitness coach	Kritapoj Dangkula (Thailand) Treenet Jankrob
Analyst	Pablo Muñiz; Saranpat Boeploy
Kit manager	Thanawat Ngualamhin
Kit manager	Suphat Pholyuthaphum
Doctor	Keerati Surakarn
Doctor	Phakphon Issarakraisil
Physiotherapists	Yohei Shiraki
Physiotherapists	Suwicha Noradee
Masseur	Songwut Khamfung
Masseur	Amnuay Saklebpradu
Interpreter	Hasdin Sukkoki
Team coordinator	Chonlachart Siripanich

=== Coaching history ===
- (Thailand) Bunchoo Samutkojon (1956–1964)
- (Thailand) Pratiab Thesvisarn (1965–1968)
- (West Germany) Günther Glomb (1968–1975)
- (Thailand) Naowarat Patanon (1975)
- (West Germany) Peter Schnittger (1976–1978)
- (West Germany) Werner Bickelhaupt (1979)
- (Thailand) Vichit Yamboonraungb (1979)
- (Thailand) Supakit Meelarpkit (1980)
- (Thailand) Prawit Chaisam (1981–1983, 1988–1989)
- (Thailand) Yanyong Na Nongkhai (1983)
- (Thailand) Saner Chaiyong (1984)
- (West Germany) Burkhard Ziese (1985–1986)
- (Thailand) Chirtsak Chaiyaboot (1987)
- (Brazil) Carlos Roberto (1989–1991)
- (Germany) Peter Stubbe (1991–1994)
- (Thailand) Worawit Sumpachanyasathit (1994)
- (Thailand) Chatchai Paholpat (1994–1995, 2004)
- (Thailand) Thawatchai Sartjakul (1996)
- (Thailand) Arjhan Srong-ngamsub (1996)
- (Germany) Dettmar Cramer (1997)
- (Thailand) Witthaya Laohakul (1997–1998)
- (England) Peter Withe (1998–2003)
- (Brazil) Carlos Roberto (2003–2004)
- (Germany) Sigfried Held (2004)
- (Thailand) Charnwit Polcheewin (2005–2008)
- (England) Peter Reid (2008–2009)
- (England) Bryan Robson (2009–2011)
- (Germany) Winfried Schäfer (2011–2013)
- (Thailand) Surachai Jaturapattarapong (2013)
- (Thailand) Kiatisuk Senamuang (2014–2017)
- (Serbia) Milovan Rajevac (2017–2019)
- (Thailand) Sirisak Yodyardthai (2019)
- (Japan) Akira Nishino (2019–2021)
- (Brazil) Alexandré Pölking (2021–2023)
- (Japan) Masatada Ishii (2023–2025)
- (England) Anthony Hudson (2025–present)

=== Statistical summary ===
As of 17 November 2026 after the match against Tajikistan.

Manager	Period	Record					
Manager	Period	Matches	Won	Drawn	Lost	Win %	Honours
(Thailand) Bunchoo Samutkojon	1956–1964	-	-	-	-	-	1956 Summer Olympics (First round)
(Thailand) Pratiab Thesvisarn	1965–1968	-	-	-	-	-	
(Germany) Günther Glomb	1968–1975	-	-	-	-	-	1968 Summer Olympics (Group stage); 1972 AFC Asian Cup (Third place)
(Thailand) Naowarat Patanon	1975	-	-	-	-	-	
(Germany) Peter Schnittger	1976–1978	-	-	-	-	-	
(Germany) Werner Bickelhaupt	1979	-	-	-	-	-	
(Thailand) Vichit Yamboonraungb	1979	-	-	-	-	-	
(Thailand) Supakit Meelarpkit	1980	-	-	-	-	-	
(Thailand) Prawit Chaisam	1981–1983	-	-	-	-	-	
(Thailand) Yanyong Na Nongkhai	1983	-	-	-	-	-	
(Thailand) Saner Chaiyong	1984	-	-	-	-	-	
(Germany) Burkhard Ziese	1985-1986	-	-	-	-	-	1985 Southeast Asian Games (Gold medal)
(Thailand) Chirtsak Chaiyaboot	1987	-	-	-	-	-	
(Thailand) Prawit Chaisam	1988-1989	-	-	-	-	-	
(Brazil) Carlos Roberto	1989–1991	-	-	-	-	-	1989 King's Cup; 1990 King's Cup; 1990 Asian Games (Fourth place)
(Germany) Peter Stubbe	1991–1994	-	-	-	-	-	1992 AFC Asian Cup (Group stage); 1993 Southeast Asian Games (Gold medal); 1994 Indonesian Independence Cup
(Thailand) Worawit Sumpachanyasathit	1994	-	-	-	-	-	
(Thailand) Chatchai Paholpat	1994–1995	-	-	-	-	-	1995 Southeast Asian Games (Gold medal)
(Thailand) Thawatchai Sartjakul	1996	-	-	-	-	-	1996 AFF Championship
(Thailand) Arjhan Srong-ngamsub	1996	15	9	3	3	60.00%	1996 AFC Asian Cup (Group stage)
(Germany) Dettmar Cramer	1997	-	-	-	-	-	
(Thailand) Witthaya Laohakul	1997–1998	24	10	9	5	41.67%	1997 Southeast Asian Games (Gold medal); 1998 AFF Championship (Fourth place)
(England) Peter Withe	1998–2003	101	46	25	30	45.54%	1999 Southeast Asian Games (Gold medal); 2000 AFF Championship; 2000 King's Cup; 2002 AFF Championship
(Brazil) Carlos Roberto	2003–2004	13	6	2	5	46.15%	–
(Thailand) Chatchai Paholpat	2004	8	2	1	5	25.00%	–
(Germany) Sigfried Held	2004–2005	11	4	4	3	36.36%	–
(Thailand) Charnwit Polcheewin	2005–2008	39	18	11	10	46.15%	2006 King's Cup; 2006 VFF Cup; 2007 King's Cup
(England) Peter Reid	2008–2009	17	9	4	4	52.94%	2008 VFF Cup
(England) Bryan Robson	2009–2011	15	6	4	5	40.00%	–
(Germany) Winfried Schäfer	2011–2013	28	14	6	8	50.00%	–
(Thailand) Surachai Jaturapattarapong (Interim)	2013	3	0	0	3	0.00%	–
(Thailand) Kiatisuk Senamuang	2014–2017	42	21	7	14	50.00%	2014 AFF Championship; 2016 AFF Championship; 2016 King's Cup
(Serbia) Milovan Rajevac	2017–2019	20	8	7	5	40.00%	2017 King's Cup
(Thailand) Sirisak Yodyardthai (Interim)	2019	7	2	1	4	28.57%	–
(Japan) Akira Nishino	2019–2021	11	2	5	4	18.18%	–
(Brazil) Alexandré Pölking	2021–2023	37	21	8	8	56.76%	2020 AFF Championship; 2022 AFF Championship
(Japan) Masatada Ishii	2023–2025	30	16	6	8	53.33%	2024 King's Cup
(England) Anthony Hudson	2025–present	19	12	4	3	63.16%	2026 King's Cup

== Players ==
=== Current squad ===
The following 23 players were named in the squad for the 2026 King's Cup.
Caps and goals as of 17 November 2026, after the match against Tajikistan.

No.	Pos.	Player	Date of birth (age)	Caps	Goals	Club
1	GK	Patiwat Khammai	24 December 1994 (age 31)	33	0	(Football Association of Thailand) Bangkok United
20	GK	Saranon Anuin	24 March 1994 (age 32)	10	0	(Football Association of Thailand) BG Pathum United
23	GK	Sorawat Phosaman	30 January 2003 (age 23)	0	0	(Football Association of Thailand) Pattani
21	DF	Suphanan Bureerat	10 October 1993 (age 33)	43	3	(Football Association of Thailand) Port
12	DF	Nicholas Mickelson	24 July 1999 (age 27)	37	2	(German Football Association) SV Elversberg
5	DF	Suphan Thongsong	26 August 1994 (age 32)	22	0	(Football Association of Thailand) Bangkok United
2	DF	Nattapong Sayriya	26 April 1992 (age 34)	20	0	(Football Association of Thailand) Chonburi
15	DF	Santiphap Channgom	23 September 1996 (age 30)	9	0	(Football Association of Thailand) Chonburi
13	DF	Oussama Thiangkham	4 November 2003 (age 23)	9	0	(Football Association of Thailand) PT Prachuap
4	DF	Peerawat Akkratum	3 December 1998 (age 27)	5	0	(Football Association of Thailand) Port
3	MF	Theerathon Bunmathan	6 February 1990 (age 36)	102	9	(Football Association of Thailand) Buriram United
6	MF	Sarach Yooyen	30 May 1992 (age 34)	101	9	(Football Association of Thailand) BG Pathum United
7	MF	Supachok Sarachat	22 May 1998 (age 28)	53	12	(Japan Football Association) Hokkaido Consadole Sapporo
18	MF	Weerathep Pomphan	19 September 1996 (age 30)	51	0	(Football Association of Thailand) Bangkok United
22	MF	Seksan Ratree	14 March 2003 (age 23)	30	8	(Football Association of Thailand) Port
11	MF	Anan Yodsangwal	9 July 2001 (age 25)	16	1	(Football Association of Thailand) Buriram United
14	MF	Kakana Khamyok	21 May 2004 (age 22)	15	3	(Football Association of Thailand) Bangkok United
8	MF	William Weidersjö	10 June 2001 (age 25)	14	1	(Football Association of Thailand) Uthai Thani
19	MF	Teerapat Pruetong	17 February 2007 (age 19)	4	0	(Japan Football Association) Hokkaido Consadole Sapporo
16	MF	Iklas Sanron	16 December 2004 (age 21)	5	2	(Football Association of Thailand) Buriram United
17	FW	Teerasak Poeiphimai	21 September 2002 (age 24)	38	15	(Football Association of Thailand) Port
10	FW	Suphanat Mueanta	2 August 2002 (age 24)	37	15	(Japan Football Association) Omiya Ardija
9	FW	Yotsakorn Burapha	8 June 2005 (age 21)	11	6	(Football Association of Thailand) Chonburi

=== Recent call-ups ===
The following players have been called up within the last 12 months.

Pos.	Player	Date of birth (age)	Caps	Goals	Club	Latest call-up
GK	Kampol Pathomakkakul	27 July 1992 (age 34)	19	0	(Thailand) Ratchaburi	2026 FIFA ASEAN Cup
GK	Chatchai Budprom	4 February 1987 (age 39)	20	0	(Thailand) Buriram United	2026 ASEAN Championship
GK	Korrakot Pipatnadda	15 July 1999 (age 27)	2	0	(Thailand) Muangthong United	2026 ASEAN Championship
DF	Narubadin Weerawatnodom	12 July 1994 (age 32)	43	1	(Thailand) Buriram United	2026 King's Cup^{INJ}
DF	James Beresford	17 April 2002 (age 24)	4	0	(Thailand) Bangkok United	2026 King's Cup^{INJ}
DF	Manuel Bihr	17 September 1993 (age 33)	34	1	(Thailand) Port	2026 King's Cup^{INJ}
DF	Kritsada Kaman	18 March 1999 (age 27)	41	1	(Thailand) BG Pathum United	2026 FIFA ASEAN Cup
DF	Waris Choolthong	8 January 2004 (age 22)	12	1	(Thailand) BG Pathum United	2026 FIFA ASEAN Cup
DF	Chaiyaphon Otton	4 April 2003 (age 23)	10	1	(Thailand) Port	2026 FIFA ASEAN Cup
DF	Jonathan Khemdee	9 May 2002 (age 24)	13	0	(Thailand) Ratchaburi	2026 FIFA ASEAN Cup^{INJ}
DF	Pansa Hemviboon	8 July 1990 (age 36)	59	7	(Thailand) Buriram United	2026 ASEAN Championship
DF	Adisorn Promrak	21 October 1993 (age 33)	33	0	(Thailand) Ratchaburi	2026 ASEAN Championship
DF	Wanchai Jarunongkran	18 December 1996 (age 29)	11	1	(Thailand) Bangkok United	2026 ASEAN Championship
DF	Pichitchai Sienkrathok	18 March 2003 (age 23)	0	0	(Thailand) Ayutthaya United	2026 ASEAN Championship
MF	Thanawat Suengchitthawon	8 January 2000 (age 26)	13	1	(Thailand) Ratchaburi	2026 King's Cup^{INJ}
MF	Chanathip Songkrasin (captain)	5 October 1993 (age 33)	80	15	(Thailand) BG Pathum United	2026 FIFA ASEAN Cup
MF	Peeradol Chamrasamee	15 September 1992 (age 34)	44	5	(Thailand) Port	2026 FIFA ASEAN Cup
MF	Thossawat Limwannasathian	17 May 1993 (age 33)	7	0	(Thailand) Ratchaburi	2026 ASEAN Championship
MF	Worachit Kanitsribampen	24 August 1997 (age 29)	40	3	(Thailand) Port	2026 ASEAN Championship
MF	Chawanwit Saelao	12 September 2004 (age 22)	4	0	(Thailand) Prime Bangkok	2026 ASEAN Championship
MF	Picha Autra	7 January 1996 (age 30)	14	0	(Thailand) Bangkok United	2026 ASEAN Championship
MF	Pokklaw Anan	4 March 1991 (age 35)	51	6	(Thailand) Bangkok United	2026 ASEAN Championship
MF	Erawan Garnier	5 January 2006 (age 20)	1	0	(France) Bastia	v. China, 9 June 2026
MF	Thitiphan Puangchan	1 September 1993 (age 33)	60	7	(Thailand) Bangkok United	v. China, 9 June 2026
MF	Ben Davis	24 November 2000 (age 25)	13	5	(Thailand) Uthai Thani	v. Turkmenistan, 31 March 2026
FW	Jude Soonsup-Bell	10 January 2004 (age 22)	9	3	(Thailand) Port	2026 King's Cup^{INJ}
FW	Supachai Chaided	1 December 1998 (age 27)	49	8	(Thailand) Buriram United	2026 FIFA ASEAN Cup
FW	Patrik Gustavsson	19 April 2001 (age 25)	15	8	(Thailand) BG Pathum United	2026 ASEAN Championship
FW	Jehhanafee Mamah	24 October 2005 (age 21)	6	1	(Thailand) PT Prachuap	2026 ASEAN Championship
FW	Teerasil Dangda	6 June 1988 (age 38)	130	64	(Thailand) Bangkok United	v. China, 9 June 2026
FW	Surachat Sareepim	24 May 1986 (age 40)	8	0	(Thailand) BG Pathum United	v. China, 9 June 2026
^{INJ} Withdrew from the squad due to injury^{PRE} Included in the Preliminary squad or on standby^{RET} Retired from the national team^{SUS} Serving suspension from the national team^{WD} Withdrew from the squad due to non-injury issue

== Player records ==
As of 17 November 2026
Players in bold are still active with Thailand.

=== Most appearances ===
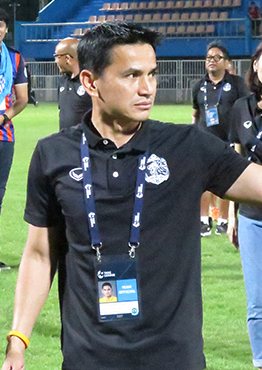
Kiatisuk Senamuang is Thailand's top goalscorer and their most capped player

Rank	Player	Caps	Goals	Career
1	Kiatisuk Senamuang	134	71	1993–2007
2	**Teerasil Dangda**	130	64	2007–present
3	Totchtawan Sripan	110	19	1993–2009
4	**Theerathon Bunmathan**	102	9	2010–present
5	**Sarach Yooyen**	101	9	2013–present
6	Piyapong Pue-on	100	70	1981–1997
6	Datsakorn Thonglao	100	11	2003–2017
8	Dusit Chalermsan	97	14	1994–2004
9	Niweat Siriwong	87	3	1997–2012
9	Natee Thongsookkaew	87	1	1986–2000

=== Top goalscorers ===
Rank	Player	Goals	Caps	Ratio	Career
1	Kiatisuk Senamuang	71	134	0.53	1993–2007
2	Piyapong Pue-on	70	100	0.7	1981–1997
3	**Teerasil Dangda**	64	130	0.49	2007–present
4	Sarayuth Chaikamdee	31	49	0.63	2003–2011
5	Vithoon Kijmongkolsak	29	84	0.35	1985–1995
6	Worrawoot Srimaka	28	63	0.44	1995–2003
6	Daoyod Dara	28	70	0.4	1975–1986
6	Niwat Srisawat	28	85	0.33	1967–1979
9	Jedsadaphon Na Phatthalung	27	79	0.34	1971–1981
10	Suttha Sudsa-ard	25	51	0.49	1978–1988
10	Natipong Sritong-In	25	55	0.45	1994–1997
10	Chalor Hongkajorn	25	67	0.37	1979–1987

== Competitive record ==
=== FIFA World Cup ===
FIFA World Cup record										Qualification record					
Year	Result	Position	Pld	W	D*	L	GF	GA	Squad	Pld	W	D	L	GF	GA
(Uruguay) 1930	Withdrew									Qualified as invitees					
(Italy) 1934	Did not enter									Did not enter					
(France) 1938	Did not enter									Did not enter					
(Brazil) 1950	Did not enter									Did not enter					
(Switzerland) 1954	Did not enter									Did not enter					
(Sweden) 1958	Did not enter									Did not enter					
(Chile) 1962	Did not enter									Did not enter					
(England) 1966	Did not enter									Did not enter					
(Mexico) 1970	Did not enter									Did not enter					
(West Germany) 1974	Did not qualify									4	0	0	4	0	13
(Argentina) 1978	Did not qualify									4	1	0	3	8	12
(Spain) 1982	Did not qualify									3	0	1	2	3	13
(Mexico) 1986	Did not qualify									6	1	2	3	4	4
(Italy) 1990	Did not qualify									6	1	0	5	2	14
(United States) 1994	Did not qualify									8	4	0	4	13	7
(France) 1998	Did not qualify									4	1	1	2	5	6
(South Korea) (Japan) 2002	Did not qualify									14	5	5	4	25	20
(Germany) 2006	Did not qualify									6	2	1	3	9	10
(South Africa) 2010	Did not qualify									10	3	2	5	20	17
(Brazil) 2014	Did not qualify									8	2	2	4	7	10
(Russia) 2018	Did not qualify									16	4	4	8	20	30
(Qatar) 2022	Did not qualify									8	2	3	3	9	9
(Canada) (Mexico) (United States) 2026	Did not qualify									6	2	2	2	9	9
(Morocco) (Portugal) (Spain) 2030	To be determined									To be determined					
(Saudi Arabia) 2034	To be determined									To be determined					
Total		0/23	–	–	–	–	–	–	—	103	28	23	52	134	174

=== AFC Asian Cup ===
AFC Asian Cup record										Qualification record					
Year	Result	Position	Pld	W	D*	L	GF	GA	Squad	Pld	W	D	L	GF	GA
(Hong Kong) 1956	Withdrew									Withdrew					
(South Korea) 1960	Withdrew									Withdrew					
(Israel) 1964	Did not qualify									3	0	1	2	4	9
(Iran) 1968	Did not qualify									4	2	0	2	5	4
(Thailand) 1972	Third place	3rd	5	0	3	2	6	9	Squad	5	3	1	1	16	4
(Iran) 1976	Qualified but withdrew									4	3	0	1	8	2
(Kuwait) 1980	Did not qualify									6	4	0	2	13	4
(Singapore) 1984	Did not qualify									5	3	0	2	9	10
(Qatar) 1988	Did not qualify									5	1	2	2	5	12
(Japan) 1992	Group stage	7th	3	0	2	1	1	5	Squad	2	2	0	0	3	1
(United Arab Emirates) 1996	Group stage	12th	3	0	0	3	2	13	Squad	6	4	2	0	31	5
(Lebanon) 2000	Group stage	9th	3	0	2	1	2	4	Squad	6	4	1	1	13	8
(China) 2004	Group stage	16th	3	0	0	3	1	9	Squad	6	3	0	3	10	7
(Indonesia) (Malaysia) (Thailand) (Vietnam) 2007	Group stage	10th	3	1	1	1	3	5	Squad	Qualified as co-hosts					
(Qatar) 2011	Did not qualify									6	1	3	2	3	3
(Australia) 2015	Did not qualify									6	0	0	6	7	21
(United Arab Emirates) 2019	Round of 16	14th	4	1	1	2	4	7	Squad	6	4	2	0	14	6
(Qatar) 2023	Round of 16	13th	4	1	2	1	3	2	Squad	11	4	3	4	14	11
(Saudi Arabia) 2027	Qualified									12	7	2	3	25	14
Total	Third place	9/19	28	3	11	14	22	54	—	93	46	16	31	180	120

AFC Asian Cup history
First match	Thailand 1–1 Iraq (11 May 1972; Bangkok, Thailand)
Biggest win	Oman 0–2 Thailand (12 July 2007; Bangkok, Thailand); Thailand 2–0 Kyrgyzstan (16 January 2024; Doha, Qatar)
Biggest defeat	Saudi Arabia 6–0 Thailand (5 December 1996; Dubai, United Arab Emirates)
Best result	Third place (1972)
Worst result	Group stage (1992, 1996, 2000, 2004, 2007)

=== ASEAN Championship ===
ASEAN Championship record
Year	Result	Position	Pld	W	D*	L	GF	GA	Squad
(Singapore) 1996	Champions	1st	6	5	1	0	18	3	Squad
(Vietnam) 1998	Fourth place	4th	5	2	2	1	10	10	Squad
(Thailand) 2000	Champions	1st	5	5	0	0	15	3	Squad
(Indonesia) (Singapore) 2002	Champions	1st	5	2	2	1	13	7	Squad
(Malaysia) (Vietnam) 2004	Group stage	5th	4	2	1	1	13	4	Squad
(Singapore) (Thailand) 2007	Runners-up	2nd	7	3	3	1	10	4	Squad
(Indonesia) (Thailand) 2008	Runners-up	2nd	7	5	1	1	16	4	Squad
(Indonesia) (Vietnam) 2010	Group stage	6th	3	0	2	1	3	4	Squad
(Malaysia) (Thailand) 2012	Runners-up	2nd	7	5	1	1	14	6	Squad
(Singapore) (Vietnam) 2014	Champions	1st	7	5	1	1	14	6	Squad
(Myanmar) (Philippines) 2016	Champions	1st	7	6	0	1	15	4	Squad
(ASEAN) 2018	Semi-finals	3rd	6	3	3	0	17	5	Squad
(Singapore) 2020	Champions	1st	8	6	2	0	18	3	Squad
(ASEAN) 2022	Champions	1st	8	5	2	1	19	5	Squad
(ASEAN) 2024	Runners-up	2nd	8	5	0	3	25	12	Squad
(ASEAN) 2026	Runners-up	2nd	8	5	1	2	16	5	Squad
Total	7 Titles	16/16	103	64	22	15	236	86	—

ASEAN Championship history
First match	Philippines 0–5 Thailand (2 September 1996; Jurong, Singapore)
Biggest win	Timor-Leste 0–10 Thailand (8 December 2024; Hanoi, Vietnam)
Biggest defeat	Vietnam 3–0 Thailand (3 September 1998; Hanoi, Vietnam)
Best result	Champions (1996, 2000, 2002, 2014, 2016, 2020, 2022)
Worst result	Group stage (2004, 2010)

=== FIFA ASEAN Cup ===
FIFA ASEAN Cup record
Year	Result	Position	Pld	W	D	L	GF	GA	Squad
(Indonesia) 2026	Runners-up	2nd	4	2	1	1	9	4	Squad
Total	Runners-up	1/1	4	2	1	1	9	4	—

=== Olympic Games ===
Olympic Games record										Qualification record					
Year	Result	Position	Pld	W	D*	L	GF	GA	Squad	Pld	W	D	L	GF	GA
1900–1904	Only club teams participated									No qualifiers were held					
1908–1952	Did not enter									No qualifiers were held					
(Australia) 1956	First round	11th	1	0	0	1	0	9	Squad	Bye					
(Italy) 1960	First round qualification									2	0	0	2	2	6
(Japan) 1964	Second round qualification									4	2	0	2	4	10
(Mexico) 1968	Group stage	16th	3	0	0	3	1	19	Squad	4	3	0	1	5	6
(West Germany) 1972	Final round qualification									6	1	2	3	5	12
(Canada) 1976	Withdrew									Withdrew					
(Soviet Union) 1980	Did not enter									Did not enter					
(United States) 1984	Second round qualification									10	5	2	3	13	8
(South Korea) 1988	Second round qualification									8	3	2	3	8	7
1992–present	See Thailand national under-23 team									See Thailand national under-23 team					
Total	First round	11th	4	0	0	4	1	28	—	33	14	6	14	37	49

Olympic Games history
First match	Great Britain 9–0 Thailand (24 November 1956; Melbourne, Australia)
Last match	Czechoslovakia 8–0 Thailand (18 October 1968; Guadalajara, Mexico)
Biggest win	—
Biggest defeat	Great Britain 9–0 Thailand (24 November 1956; Melbourne, Australia)
Best result	First round (1956)
Worst result	Group stage (1968)

=== Asian Games ===
Asian Games record
Year	Result	Position	Pld	W	D*	L	GF	GA	Squad
(India) 1951 to (Japan) 1958	Did not enter								
(Indonesia) 1962	Group stage	7th	3	0	0	3	4	10	Squad
(Thailand) 1966	Quarter-finals	6th	4	1	1	2	5	8	Squad
(Thailand) 1970	Quarter-finals	6th	4	1	2	1	6	6	Squad
(Iran) 1974	Group stage	12th	2	0	0	2	2	4	Squad
(Thailand) 1978	Quarter-finals	6th	5	2	0	3	6	12	Squad
(India) 1982	Group stage	10th	3	1	0	2	3	5	Squad
(South Korea) 1986	Group stage	11th	4	1	1	2	8	4	Squad
(China) 1990	Fourth place	4th	6	3	1	2	5	3	Squad
(Japan) 1994	Group stage	15th	4	0	1	3	8	12	Squad
(Thailand) 1998	Fourth place	4th	8	4	1	3	12	10	Squad
2002–present	See Thailand national under-23 team								
Total	Fourth place	4th	43	13	7	23	59	74	—

Asian Games history
First match	Japan 3–1 Thailand (25 August 1962; Jakarta, Indonesia)
Last match	China 3–0 Thailand (16 December 1998; Bangkok, Thailand)
Biggest win	Thailand 6–0 Pakistan (29 September 1986; Daegu, South Korea)
Biggest defeat	Thailand 1–5 Japan (17 December 1966; Bangkok, Thailand)
Best result	Fourth place (1990, 1998)
Worst result	Group stage (1962, 1974, 1982, 1986, 1994)

=== Southeast Asian Games ===
Southeast Asian Games record
Year	Result	Position	Pld	W	D*	L	GF	GA
(Thailand) 1959	Silver	2nd	4	2	0	2	9	10
(Myanmar) 1961	Bronze	3rd	3	1	2	0	7	4
(Malaysia) 1965	Gold^{1}	1st	3	2	1	0	6	3
(Thailand) 1967	Bronze	3rd	4	2	0	2	9	8
(Myanmar) 1969	Silver	2nd	3	1	1	1	4	4
(Malaysia) 1971	Bronze	3rd	5	1	2	2	7	8
(Singapore) 1973	Group stage	5th	2	0	1	1	1	2
(Thailand) 1975	Gold	1st	3	1	2	0	5	4
(Malaysia) 1977	Silver	2nd	4	1	1	2	3	6
(Indonesia) 1979	Bronze	3rd	5	2	2	1	6	5
(Philippines) 1981	Gold	1st	4	2	2	0	9	6
(Singapore) 1983	Gold	1st	5	3	1	1	10	4
(Thailand) 1985	Gold	1st	4	3	1	0	17	1
(Indonesia) 1987	Bronze	3rd	4	2	1	1	7	3
(Malaysia) 1989	Fourth place	4th	4	1	2	1	5	3
(Philippines) 1991	Silver	2nd	4	2	1	1	10	2
(Singapore) 1993	Gold	1st	6	6	0	0	18	6
(Thailand) 1995	Gold	1st	6	5	1	0	19	2
(Indonesia) 1997	Gold	1st	6	4	2	0	15	3
(Brunei) 1999	Gold	1st	6	5	1	0	24	1
2001–present	See Thailand national under-23 team							
Total	9 Gold medals	1st	127	70	29	19	330	109

Southeast Asian Games history
First match	South Vietnam 4–0 Thailand (13 December 1959; Bangkok, Thailand)
Last match	Thailand 2–0 Vietnam (14 August 1999; Bandar Seri Begawan, Brunei)
Biggest win	Thailand 9–0 Cambodia (12 December 1995; Chiang Mai, Thailand); Thailand 9–0 Philippines (30 July 1999; Bandar Seri Begawan, Brunei)
Biggest defeat	South Vietnam 5–0 Thailand (14 December 1967; Bangkok, Thailand)
Best result	Gold medal (1965, 1975, 1981, 1983, 1985, 1993, 1995, 1997, 1999)
Worst result	Group stage (1973)

Notes

- ^{1} : The title was shared.
- * : Denotes draws including knockout matches decided on penalty kicks.

== Head-to-head record ==
As of 17 November 2026

Thailand national football team head-to-head records
Against	First	Last	Pld	W	D	L	GF	GA	GD	Confederation
Afghanistan	2015	2025	2	2	0	0	4	0	+4	AFC
Australia	1982	2017	6	0	1	5	4	15	−11	AFC
Bahrain	1980	2022	10	3	4	3	10	11	−1	AFC
Bangladesh	1973	2012	15	8	5	2	29	13	+16	AFC
Bhutan	2012	2012	1	1	0	0	5	0	+5	AFC
Brazil	2000	2000	1	0	0	1	0	7	−7	CONMEBOL
Brunei	1971	2026	8	8	0	0	43	4	+39	AFC
Bulgaria	1996	1996	1	0	0	1	0	4	−4	UEFA
Cambodia	1957	2024	17	10	5	2	42	20	+22	AFC
Cameroon	2015	2015	1	0	0	1	2	3	−1	CAF
China	1948	2026	33	6	6	21	28	72	−44	AFC
Chinese Taipei	1959	2025	17	8	2	7	34	27	+7	AFC
Congo	2019	2019	1	0	1	0	1	1	0	CAF
Egypt	1987	1998	2	0	2	0	2	2	0	CAF
Estonia	2000	2023	3	1	2	0	3	2	+1	UEFA
Fiji	2025	2025	1	1	0	0	3	0	+3	OFC
Finland*	1996	2013	5	3	1	1	12	6	+6	UEFA
Gabon	2018	2018	1	0	1	0	0	0	0	CAF
Georgia	2023	2023	1	0	0	1	0	8	−8	UEFA
Germany	2004	2004	1	0	0	1	1	5	−4	UEFA
Ghana	1982	1983	2	0	0	2	2	6	−4	CAF
Guatemala*	1968	1968	1	0	0	1	1	4	−3	CONCACAF
Hong Kong	1961	2023	31	12	6	13	43	41	+2	AFC
India	1962	2025	25	11	7	7	38	29	+9	AFC
Indonesia	1957	2026	76	36	19	21	136	102	+34	AFC
Iran	1972	2013	14	0	3	11	5	32	−27	AFC
Iraq	1968	2025	22	3	6	13	23	55	−32	AFC
Israel*	1972	1977	3	0	2	1	3	9	−6	UEFA
Japan	1962	2024	23	2	4	17	16	57	−41	AFC
Jordan	2004	2016	7	1	5	1	4	3	+1	AFC
Kazakhstan	1998	2006	2	0	2	0	3	3	0	UEFA
Kenya	1990	2017	2	2	0	0	3	1	+2	CAF
Kuwait	1972	2026	12	4	2	7	20	32	−12	AFC
Kyrgyzstan	2001	2024	2	2	0	0	5	1	+4	AFC
Laos	1961	2026	16	13	2	1	60	16	+44	AFC
Latvia	2005	2005	1	0	1	0	1	1	0	UEFA
Lebanon	1975	2024	11	4	3	4	16	21	−5	AFC
Liberia	1984	1984	1	0	0	1	1	2	−1	CAF
Libya	1977	1977	1	0	1	0	2	2	0	CAF
Liechtenstein	1981	1981	1	1	0	0	2	0	+2	UEFA
Macau	1975	2007	3	3	0	0	15	2	+13	AFC
Malaysia	1959	2026	108	33	34	41	147	153	−6	AFC
Maldives	1996	2022	4	4	0	0	22	0	+22	AFC
Malta	1981	1981	1	0	0	1	0	2	−2	UEFA
Morocco	1980	1980	1	0	0	1	1	2	−1	CAF
Myanmar	1957	2026	56	25	15	16	106	73	+33	AFC
Nepal	1982	2022	8	7	0	1	21	3	+18	AFC
Netherlands	2007	2007	1	0	0	1	1	3	−2	UEFA
New Zealand	1969	2014	6	2	2	2	9	10	−1	OFC
Nigeria	1983	1983	1	0	1	0	0	0	0	CAF
Northern Ireland	1997	1997	1	0	1	0	0	0	0	UEFA
North Korea	1964	2017	20	4	5	11	18	36	−18	AFC
Norway	1965	2012	2	0	0	2	0	8	−8	UEFA
Oman	1986	2024	13	5	2	6	11	10	+1	AFC
Pakistan	1960	2026	7	6	0	1	24	7	+17	AFC
Palestine	2011	2011	2	1	1	0	3	2	+1	AFC
Papua New Guinea	1984	1984	1	0	0	1	1	4	−3	OFC
Philippines	1971	2026	28	22	2	4	80	17	+63	AFC
Poland	2010	2010	1	0	0	1	1	3	−2	UEFA
Qatar	1984	2016	18	4	6	8	18	26	−8	AFC
Saudi Arabia	1982	2024	17	1	2	14	9	42	−33	AFC
Singapore	1957	2026	72	42	18	12	128	75	+53	AFC
Slovakia	2004	2018	2	0	1	1	3	4	−1	UEFA
South Africa	2010	2010	1	0	0	1	0	4	−4	CAF
South Korea	1961	2024	53	9	9	35	41	109	−68	AFC
Sri Lanka	1979	2025	9	9	0	0	27	3	+24	AFC
Suriname	2022	2022	1	1	0	0	1	0	+1	CONCACAF
Sweden*	1962	2003	5	0	1	4	4	13	−9	UEFA
Syria	1978	2024	7	4	2	1	15	11	+4	AFC
Tajikistan	2003	2026	4	2	1	1	6	3	+3	AFC
Timor-Leste	2004	2024	4	4	0	0	27	0	+27	AFC
Trinidad and Tobago	2004	2022	3	3	0	0	6	3	+3	CONCACAF
Turkmenistan	1998	2026	4	2	1	1	7	7	0	AFC
United Arab Emirates	1986	2023	13	2	3	8	12	21	−9	AFC
United States	1987	1987	1	0	0	1	0	1	−1	CONCACAF
Uruguay	2019	2019	1	0	0	1	0	4	−4	CONMEBOL
Uzbekistan	1994	2024	13	6	0	7	24	25	−1	AFC
Vietnam	1956	2026	62	23	13	26	84	90	−6	AFC
Yemen	1988	2007	6	2	4	0	9	5	+4	AFC
79 Countries	1948	2026	901	354	208	340	1414	1319	+95	All
Last match updated was against Tajikistan on 17 November 2026.

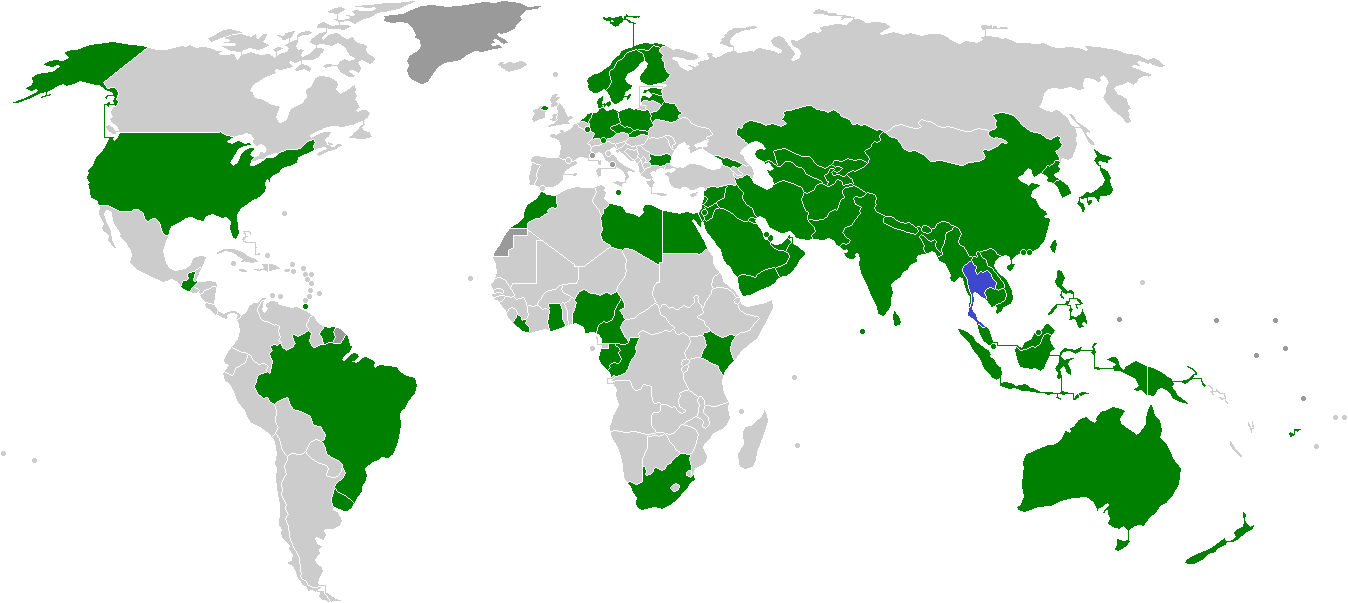
Thailand national football team all-time opponents highlighted in green.

== Honours ==
=== Continental ===
- AFC Asian Cup
  - (bronze) Third place (1): 1972

=== Regional ===
- FIFA ASEAN Cup
  - (silver) Runners-up (1): 2026
- ASEAN Championship
  - (gold) Champions (7): 1996, 2000, 2002, 2014, 2016, 2020, 2022
  - (silver) Runners-up (5): 2007, 2008, 2012, 2024, 2026
- Southeast Asian Games
  - (gold) Gold medal (9): 1965^{s}, 1975, 1981, 1983, 1985, 1993, 1995, 1997, 1999
  - (silver) Silver medal (4): 1959, 1969, 1977, 1991
  - (bronze) Bronze medal (5): 1961, 1967, 1971, 1979, 1987

=== Friendly ===
- King's Cup (17): 1976^{s}, 1979, 1980^{s}, 1981, 1982, 1984, 1989, 1990, 1992, 2000, 2006, 2007, 2016, 2017, 2024, 2026
- Indonesian Independence Cup (1): 1994
- VFF Vietnam International Friendly Cup (2): 2006, 2008
- 3 Nations in Taiwan (1): 1971
- 4 Nations in Indochina (1): 1989
- Brunei Games (1): 1990

=== Summary ===
Only official honours are included, according to FIFA statutes (competitions organized/recognized by FIFA or an affiliated confederation).

Competition	1st place, gold medalist(s)	2nd place, silver medalist(s)	3rd place, bronze medalist(s)	Total
AFC Asian Cup	0	0	1	1
FIFA ASEAN Cup	0	1	0	1
Total	0	1	1	2

Notes

- ^{s} Shared titles.

== See also ==
- Thailand national under-23 football team
- Thailand national under-21 football team
- Thailand national under-20 football team
- Thailand national under-17 football team
- Thailand national under-15 football team
- Football in Thailand

== Notes ==
Achievements
Preceded by Inaugural Champions	AFF Championship; 1996 (First title)	Succeeded by 1998 Singapore
Preceded by 1998 Singapore	AFF Championship; 2000 (Second title); 2002 (Third title)	Succeeded by 2004 Singapore
Preceded by 2012 Singapore	AFF Championship; 2014 (Fourth title); 2016 (Fifth title)	Succeeded by 2018 Vietnam
Preceded by 2018 Vietnam	AFF Championship; 2020 (Sixth title); 2022 (Seventh title)	Succeeded by 2024 Vietnam
Awards
Preceded by Singapore	AFF Team of the Year; 2015, 2017	Succeeded by Vietnam
