= Peter Schnittger =

German football coach

Personal information
- Date of birth: 22 May 1941 (age 85)
- Place of birth: Hann. Münden, Germany

Managerial career
- Years: Team
- 1968–1970: Ivory Coast
- 1970–1973: Cameroon
- 1974–1976: Ethiopia
- 1976–1978: Thailand
- 1978–1985: Madagascar
- 1990–1994: Benin
- 1995–2000: Senegal
Medal record
Men's football
Representing Cameroon(as manager)
Africa Cup of Nations
Third place	1972 Cameroon

Peter Schnittger (born 22 May 1941) is a German football coach who has managed a number of national teams throughout Africa and Asia, including Ivory Coast, Cameroon, Ethiopia, Thailand, Madagascar, Benin and Senegal. In 2006 he rejected an approach from the Algerian Football Federation to coach their national side.

Whilst coaching the Cameroonian national team, he also coached local club side Léopard Douala.

== Honours ==
=== Manager ===
Cameroon

- African Cup of Nations: 3rd place, 1972
