= Thailand–Vietnam football rivalry =

International sporting rivalry

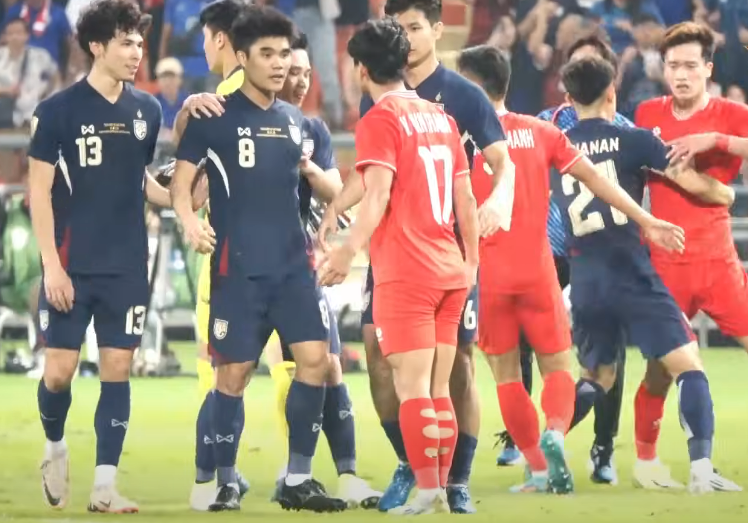
- Tension between Thailand and Vietnam players in the 2024 ASEAN Championship final
- Location: Asia (AFC); Southeast Asia (AFF)
- Teams: Thailand; Vietnam; Formerly; South Vietnam
- First meeting: as South Vietnam; Friendly; South Vietnam 2–1 Thailand (Saigon, South Vietnam; April 1956) as Vietnam; Thailand 3–1 Vietnam (Chiang Mai, Thailand; 10 December 1995)
- Latest meeting: 29 September 2026; 2026 FIFA ASEAN Cup; Thailand 2–0 Vietnam
- Next meeting: TBA

Statistics
- Total meetings: 62
- Top scorer: (Thailand) Natipong Sritong-In (6)
- All-time series: Thailand: 23; Draw: 13; Vietnam: 26
- Largest victory: as South Vietnam; Thailand 0–5 South Vietnam; 14 December 1967 as Vietnam; Thailand 4–0 Vietnam; 16 December 1995; Thailand 4–0 Vietnam; 27 December 2002
- Largest goal scoring: as South Vietnam; South Vietnam 5–2 Thailand; 19 August 1967 as Vietnam; Thailand 4–2 Vietnam; 13 September 1996

The football rivalry between Vietnam and Thailand is considered by many as a major sporting rivalry in Southeast Asia and is sometimes referred as the region's "Classic". Including the records of the South Vietnam (according to FIFA), both sides have faced each other in 62 matches since 1956, with Vietnam winning 26, Thailand 23 and 13 resulting in a draw. As one of the most popular rivalries in Southeast Asia, matches between Thailand and Vietnam often attract huge attention from the media and supporters in both countries.

== Overview ==
The Thailand and Vietnam national football teams first faced each other after Vietnamese reunification at the 1995 SEA Games in Chiang Mai, following earlier encounters during the South Vietnam era. Competitions between the two countries' teams have since developed into a fierce sporting rivalry, influenced by a strong sense of nationalism on both sides. This has at times erupted into violence, notably at the 2015 AFF U-19 Youth Championship in Vientiane.

Historically, Thailand is the most successful side in Southeast Asian men's football, winning a total of seven ASEAN Championship titles compared with Vietnam's four (as of 2026). However, in the four ASEAN Championship finals in which the two sides have met, Vietnam has won three titles, while Thailand has won one. In the 21st century, Thailand has also qualified for the AFC Asian Cup more times than Vietnam, although the latter achieved better overall performances in two of the three editions they managed to qualify for. During the 2007 AFC Asian Cup, Vietnam became the only host country to reach the knockout phase after three other hosts: Thailand, Indonesia, and Malaysia were all eliminated in the group stage. In the 2019 edition, Vietnam reached the quarter-finals while Thailand was knocked out in the round of 16. Nevertheless, in the 2023 edition, Thailand reached the round of 16 while Vietnam was knocked out in the group stage, marking their worst performance in Asian Cup history since reunification.

Despite being termed a "rivalry" by the media, encounters between Thailand and Vietnam since their first meeting in 1956 have been characterized by shifting periods of dominance, while remaining broadly balanced overall. During the early period, Thailand had an inferior record against South Vietnam, losing 20 out of 28 matches and winning only 5. However, after a unified Vietnam returned to international football in 1991, Thailand established a prolonged period of dominance until 2016, recording 14 wins, 5 draws, and only 2 losses. Since late 2017, the rivalry has become more closely contested, with 4 wins each and 5 draws in 13 matches (as of 2026). The most recent confrontation between these two teams took place in the 2026 FIFA ASEAN Cup, where Thailand won 2–0.

There have been memorable matches for both sides in the rivalry, including the 2008 AFF Championship final, when Vietnam's 2–1 victory in the first leg in Bangkok set them up for their first-ever regional title, which they secured after a 1–1 draw in Hanoi in the second leg, and Thailand's 3–0 victory in the 2018 FIFA World Cup qualification.

== History ==
=== South Vietnamese dominance (1956–1975) ===
Following the division of Vietnam in 1954, the Republic of Vietnam national team served as Vietnam's representative in matches against Thailand until 1975, as North Vietnam primarily played against other communist countries and never faced Thailand.

The first friendlies between the two sides in April 1956 saw South Vietnam record 2–1 and 3–1 victories over Thailand, respectively, marking the beginning of their competitive rivalry.

One of the earliest significant encounters between the two sides came at the inaugural Southeast Asian Peninsular Games in Bangkok on 13 December 1959. South Vietnam defeated Thailand 4–0 in the group stage and, four days later, 3–1 in the final to win the gold medal.

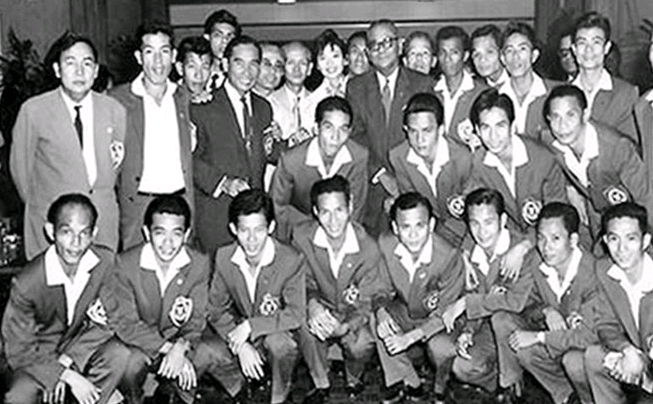
The South Vietnam team winning gold at the 1959 Southeast Asian Peninsular Games in Thailand after beating the hosts

Further encounters throughout the 1960s reinforced South Vietnam's dominance, including a 3–0 victory over Thailand in the 1964 AFC Asian Cup qualification on 14 December 1963 in Saigon and a 5–0 victory over Thailand in the semi-final of the 1967 SEAP Games on 14 December 1967 in Bangkok. Thailand nevertheless enjoyed occasional successes, including a 2–1 victory in the group stage of the 1965 SEAP Games in Kuala Lumpur, followed by a 2–0 win in the semi-final of the same tournament.

The pattern persisted into the early 1970s, with South Vietnam generally maintaining the advantage over Thailand. Thailand's most significant success during this period came on 21 March 1975, when they defeated South Vietnam 4–0 in Bangkok during the 1976 AFC Asian Cup qualification. The match also marked the final meeting between the two sides before the reunification of Vietnam.

=== Thai dominance (1995–2016) ===
In 1991, Vietnam returned to international football. The Thailand and Vietnam national football teams first met in the post-reunification era at the 1995 SEA Games in Chiang Mai, where Vietnam suffered a 3–1 defeat in the group stage on 10 December 1995. Six days later, they suffered a 4–0 defeat to Thailand in the final of that edition of the SEA Games. During this period, Thailand generally held the upper hand over Vietnam, with notable victories including a 4–0 victory over Vietnam in the semi-final of the 2002 AFF Championship in Jakarta, which remains Vietnam's heaviest defeat in ASEAN Championship history, and a 3–0 win in Hanoi during the 2018 FIFA World Cup qualification. Despite this, Vietnam also recorded several significant victories, including a 3–0 win over Thailand in the semi-final of the 1998 AFF Championship, which also remains Thailand's heaviest defeat in ASEAN Championship history, and a 2–1 win over Thailand in Bangkok in the first leg of the 2008 AFF Championship final, which helped Vietnam win the 2008 AFF Championship following a 1–1 draw in the second leg, secured by Lê Công Vinh's goal in the 90+3th minute.

=== A rivalry of equals and the Vietnamese emergence (2017–present) ===
In October 2017, the appointment of Park Hang-seo as head coach marked a significant turning point for Vietnam's national football team. Vietnam recorded its first victory over Thailand in 11 years with a 1–0 win at the 2019 King's Cup in Chang Arena thanks to a late goal by Nguyễn Anh Đức. During this period, Vietnam and Thailand have both consistently ranked among the top two teams in Southeast Asia in the FIFA World Rankings. Other notable encounters included the two matches during the 2022 FIFA World Cup qualifiers in 2019, both of which ended in goalless draws. In the semi-finals of the 2020 AFF Championship, Thailand won 2–0 on aggregate, with both goals coming in the first leg through Chanathip Songkrasin. Thailand and Vietnam met again in the 2022 AFF Championship final, where Thailand won 3–2 on aggregate, with Theerathon Bunmathan scoring the decisive goal in the second leg at Thammasat Stadium. They faced each other once more in the 2024 ASEAN Championship final, where Vietnam won 5–3 on aggregate after winning both legs, with Nguyễn Xuân Son scoring a brace in the first leg in Việt Trì and Nguyễn Hai Long scoring a late goal in the second at Rajamangala Stadium. As of 2026, the rivalry has seen three consecutive ASEAN Championship final meetings between the two teams, in 2022, 2024 and 2026.

== List of matches ==
=== Thailand vs. South Vietnam ===
#	Date	Home	Result	Away	Venue	Tournament
1	April 1956	**South Vietnam**	2–1	Thailand	Saigon	Friendly
2	April 1956	**South Vietnam**	3–1	Thailand	Saigon	Friendly
3	13 December 1959	Thailand	0–4	**South Vietnam**	Bangkok	SEAP Games 1959 (group stage)
4	17 December 1959	Thailand	1–3	**South Vietnam**	Bangkok	SEAP Games 1959 (gold medal match)
5	16 August 1961	**South Vietnam**	2–1	Thailand	Singapore	Friendly
6	11 December 1961	Thailand	0–0	South Vietnam	Rangoon	SEAP Games 1961 (group stage)
7	16 December 1961	Thailand	1–1	South Vietnam	Rangoon	SEAP Games 1961 (bronze medal match)
8	28 October 1962	South Vietnam	0–1	**Thailand**	Saigon	1962 Independence Cup (group stage)
9	17 August 1963	**South Vietnam**	3–2	Thailand	Kuala Lumpur	1963 Merdeka Tournament
10	14 December 1963	**South Vietnam**	3–0	Thailand	Saigon	1964 AFC Asian Cup qualification
11	13 November 1965	**South Vietnam**	4–0	Thailand	Saigon	1965 Independence Cup
12	15 December 1965	**Thailand**	2–1	South Vietnam	Kuala Lumpur	SEAP Games 1965 (group stage)
13	18 December 1965	**Thailand**	2–0	South Vietnam	Kuala Lumpur	SEAP Games 1965 (semi-final)
14	5 November 1966	**South Vietnam**	4–1	Thailand	Saigon	1966 Independence Cup
15	24 March 1967	Thailand	0–1	**South Vietnam**	Hong Kong	1968 AFC Asian Cup qualification
16	19 August 1967	**South Vietnam**	5–2	Thailand	Ipoh	1967 Merdeka Tournament
17	14 December 1967	Thailand	0–5	**South Vietnam**	Bangkok	SEAP Games 1967 (semi-final)
18	15 August 1968	Thailand	2–3	**South Vietnam**	Ipoh	1968 Merdeka Tournament
19	1 November 1970	**South Vietnam**	1–0	Thailand	Saigon	1970 Independence Cup (final)
20	13 December 1970	**Thailand**	1–0	South Vietnam	Bangkok	1970 Asian Games (group stage)
21	10 August 1971	**South Vietnam**	4–2	Thailand	Kuala Lumpur	1971 Merdeka Tournament (group stage)
22	26 August 1971	**South Vietnam**	2–1	Thailand	Singapore	1971 Pesta Sukan Cup (semi-final)
23	30 October 1971	**South Vietnam**	3–0	Thailand	Saigon	1974 Independence Cup (semi-final)
24	11 November 1971	Thailand	0–1	**South Vietnam**	Bangkok	1971 King's Cup (group stage)
25	18 December 1971	Thailand	0–0	South Vietnam	Kuala Lumpur	SEAP Games 1971 (bronze medal match)
26	16 May 1973	**South Vietnam**	1–0	Thailand	Seoul	1974 FIFA World Cup qualification
27	9 November 1974	**South Vietnam**	3–2	Thailand	Saigon	1974 Independence Cup
28	21 March 1975	**Thailand**	4–0	South Vietnam	Bangkok	1976 AFC Asian Cup qualification

=== Thailand vs. Vietnam ===
#	Date	Home	Result	Away	Venue	Tournament
1	10 December 1995	**Thailand**	3–1	Vietnam	Chiang Mai	SEA Games 1995 (group stage)
2	16 December 1995	**Thailand**	4–0	Vietnam	Chiang Mai	SEA Games 1995 (gold medal match)
3	13 September 1996	**Thailand**	4–2	Vietnam	Kallang	1996 AFF Championship (semi-final)
4	16 October 1997	**Thailand**	2–1	Vietnam	Jakarta	SEA Games 1997 (semi-final)
5	3 September 1998	**Vietnam**	3–0	Thailand	Hanoi	1998 AFF Championship (semi-final)
6	5 August 1999	Vietnam	0–0	Thailand	Bandar Seri Begawan	SEA Games 1999 (group stage)
7	14 August 1999	**Thailand**	2–0	Vietnam	Bandar Seri Begawan	SEA Games 1999 (gold medal match)
8	8 December 2002	**Thailand**	2–1	Vietnam	Bangkok	Friendly
9	27 December 2002	**Thailand**	4–0	Vietnam	Jakarta	2002 AFF Championship (semi-final)
10	29 October 2006	Vietnam	2–2	Thailand	Hanoi	Agribank Cup 2006
11	24 December 2006	**Thailand**	2–1	Vietnam	Bangkok	2006 King's Cup (group stage)
12	30 December 2006	**Thailand**	3–1	Vietnam	Bangkok	2006 King's Cup (final)
13	24 January 2007	Vietnam	0–2	**Thailand**	Hanoi	2007 AFF Championship (first leg semi-final)
14	28 January 2007	Thailand	0–0	Vietnam	Bangkok	2007 AFF Championship (second leg semi-final)
15	16 November 2008	Vietnam	2–2	Thailand	Hanoi	2008 T&T Cup
16	6 December 2008	**Thailand**	2–0	Vietnam	Phuket	2008 AFF Championship (group stage)
17	24 December 2008	Thailand	1–2	**Vietnam**	Bangkok	2008 AFF Championship (first-leg final)
18	28 December 2008	Vietnam	1–1	Thailand	Hanoi	2008 AFF Championship (second-leg final)
19	30 November 2012	**Thailand**	3–1	Vietnam	Bangkok	2012 AFF Championship (group stage)
20	24 May 2015	**Thailand**	1–0	Vietnam	Bangkok	2018 FIFA World Cup qualification
21	13 October 2015	Vietnam	0–3	**Thailand**	Hanoi	2018 FIFA World Cup qualification
22	5 June 2019	Thailand	0–1	**Vietnam**	Buriram	2019 King's Cup (semi-final)
23	5 September 2019	Thailand	0–0	Vietnam	Pathum Thani	2022 FIFA World Cup qualification
24	19 November 2019	Vietnam	0–0	Thailand	Hanoi	2022 FIFA World Cup qualification
25	23 December 2021	Vietnam	0–2	**Thailand**	Kallang	2020 AFF Championship (first leg semi-finals)
26	26 December 2021	Thailand	0–0	Vietnam	Kallang	2020 AFF Championship (second leg semi-finals)
27	13 January 2023	Vietnam	2–2	Thailand	Hanoi	2022 AFF Championship (first leg final)
28	16 January 2023	**Thailand**	1–0	Vietnam	Pathum Thani	2022 AFF Championship (second leg final)
29	10 September 2024	Vietnam	1–2	**Thailand**	Hanoi	2024 LPBank Cup
30	2 January 2025	**Vietnam**	2–1	Thailand	Việt Trì	2024 ASEAN Championship (first leg final)
31	5 January 2025	Thailand	2–3	**Vietnam**	Bangkok	2024 ASEAN Championship (second leg final)
32	22 August 2026	Thailand	0–2	**Vietnam**	Bangkok	2026 ASEAN Championship (first leg final)
33	26 August 2026	Vietnam	2–2	Thailand	Hanoi	2026 ASEAN Championship (second leg final)
34	29 September 2026	**Thailand**	2–0	Vietnam	Bandung	2026 FIFA ASEAN Cup

=== Statistics ===
==== Honours ====
Vietnam	Competition	Thailand
**Southeast Asia, Asia and Worldwide**
–	FIFA ASEAN Cup	–
4	ASEAN Championship	7
1	Southeast Asian Games (until 1999)	9
Best: Fourth place	AFC Asian Cup	Best: Third place
Best: Fourth place	Asian Games (until 1998)	Best: Fourth place
Best: Qualified round 3	FIFA World Cup	Best: Qualified round 3
–	Summer Olympics (until 1988)	Best: Group stage

==== Top scorers ====
As of 29 September 2026

Players in bold are still active for the national team

Rank	Player	Goals
1	Natipong Sritong-In	6
2	Totchtawan Sripan	3
2	Kiatisuk Senamuang	3
2	Datsakorn Thonglao	3
2	Lê Công Vinh	3
3	Nguyễn Hồng Sơn	2
3	**Nguyễn Xuân Son**	2
3	Phan Thanh Bình	2
3	**Nguyễn Tiến Linh**	2
3	**Nguyễn Hai Long**	2
3	Cù Sinh	2
3	**Teerasil Dangda**	2
3	Kirati Keawsombat	2
3	**Chanathip Songkrasin**	2
3	**Theerathon Bunmathan**	2
3	**Sarach Yooyen**	2

== Women's matches ==
The two nations also have a notable rivalry in women's football, as both teams have historically been among the strongest in the region. In 39 meetings, Vietnam has won 20 matches, Thailand 9, and 10 have ended in draws.

No.	Date	Competition	Home team	Score	Away team	Venue	Goals (home)	Goals (away)
1.	7 October 1997	1997 Southeast Asian Games	**Thailand**	**3–2**	Vietnam	(Indonesia) Jakarta	unknown	unknown
2.	10 December 1998	1998 Asian Games	Thailand	**1–1**	Vietnam	(Thailand) Thupatemi Stadium, Pathum Thani	unknown	unknown
3.	15 September 2001	2001 Southeast Asian Games	**Vietnam**	**4–0**	Thailand	(Malaysia) Petaling Jaya	Bùi Thị Hiền Lương 9', 83'; Nguyễn Thị Thuý Nga 30' (pen.); Lưu Ngọc Mai 49' (pen.)	
4.	2003	Friendly	**Vietnam**	**3–0**	Thailand	(Vietnam) Quảng Ninh	unknown	
5.	8 December 2003	2003 Southeast Asian Games	**Vietnam**	**3–1**	Thailand	(Vietnam) Lạch Tray Stadium, Hải Phòng	Lưu Ngọc Mai 6'; Phùng Minh Nguyệt 36'; Saipin 49' (o.g.)	Piamsin 63'
6.	20 April 2004	2004 Summer Olympics qualification	Vietnam	**0–0**	Thailand	(Japan) Komazawa Olympic Park Stadium, Tokyo		
7.	26 November 2005	2005 Southeast Asian Games	Thailand	**0–1**	**Vietnam**	(Philippines) Marikina Sports Complex, Marikina		Đỗ Hồng Tiến 20'
8.	31 May 2006	2006 AFF Women's Championship	**Vietnam**	**3–2**	Thailand	(Vietnam) Thành Long Sports Centre, Hồ Chí Minh City	Lê Hoài Thu 39' Đoàn Kim Chi 49' Huyền Linh 90+3'	Pitsamai 53' Sukunya 69'
9.	19 February 2007	2008 Summer Olympics qualification	**Thailand**	**1–0**	Vietnam	(Thailand) Thai-Japanese Stadium, Bangkok	unknown 85'	
10.	3 June 2007	2008 Summer Olympics qualification	**Vietnam**	**1–0**	Thailand	(Vietnam) Lạch Tray Stadium, Hải Phòng	Nhiêu Thùy Linh 41'	
11.	10 June 2007	2008 Summer Olympics qualification	**Thailand**	**5–0**	Vietnam	(Thailand) Rajamangala Stadium, Bangkok	unknown	
12.	13 September 2007	2007 AFF Women's Championship	Vietnam	**0–3**	**Thailand**	(Myanmar) Thuwunna Stadium, Yangon		Sunisa 2'; Nisa (?); Chidtawan 62'
13.	13 December 2007	2007 Southeast Asian Games	**Thailand**	**2–0**	Vietnam	(Thailand) Nakhon Ratchasima Municipal Stadium, Nakhon Ratchasima	Pitsamai 61'; Anootsara 71' (pen.)	
14.	1 June 2008	2008 AFC Women's Asian Cup	**Vietnam**	**1–0**	Thailand	(Vietnam) Thống Nhất Stadium, Hồ Chí Minh City	Đoàn Thị Kim Chi 70'	
15.	18 October 2008	2008 AFF Women's Championship	**Vietnam**	**2–1**	Thailand	(Vietnam) Thành Long Sports Centre, Hồ Chí Minh City	Trần Thị Kim Hồng 8' (pen.), 50' (pen.)	Nisa 52'
16.	23 October 2009	Friendly	**Vietnam**	**2–0**	Thailand	(Vietnam) Cẩm Phả Stadium, Cẩm Phả	Đỗ Thị Ngọc Châm 24', 77'	
17.	11 December 2009	2009 Southeast Asian Games	Vietnam	**2–2**	Thailand	National University of Laos Stadium, Vientiane	Nguyễn Thị Muôn 4'; Văn Thị Thanh 32'	Nguyễn Thị Ngọc Anh 41' (o.g.); Sukunya 88'
18.	16 December 2009	2009 Southeast Asian Games	Thailand	**0–0** (a.e.t.) (**0–3** p)	**Vietnam**	Laos National Stadium, Vientiane		
19.	25 March 2011	2012 Summer Olympics qualification	**Vietnam**	**2–1**	Thailand	(Taiwan) Kaohsiung National Stadium, Kaohsiung	Nguyễn Thị Hòa 53'; Lê Thu Thanh Hương 90+2'	Chidtawan 1'
20.	12 June 2011	2012 Summer Olympics qualification	Vietnam	**3–3**	Thailand	(Jordan) King Abdullah Stadium, Amman	Lê Thị Thương 8'; Nguyễn Thị Muôn 12'; Lê Thu Thanh Hương 37'	Nguyễn Hải Hòa 18' (o.g.); Kanjana 25'; Wilaiporn 84'
21.	9 September 2013	2013 AFF Women's Championship	Thailand	**0–0**	Vietnam	(Myanmar) Thuwunna Stadium, Yangon		
22.	13 December 2013	2013 Southeast Asian Games	Vietnam	**1–2**	**Thailand**	(Myanmar) Mandalarthiri Stadium, Mandalay	Nguyễn Thị Minh Nguyệt 33'	Naphat 40'; Anootsara 47'
23.	21 May 2014	2014 AFC Women's Asian Cup	Vietnam	**1–2**	**Thailand**	(Vietnam) Thống Nhất Stadium, Hồ Chí Minh City	Nguyễn Thị Tuyết Dung 86'	Kanjana 48', 65'
24.	26 September 2014	2014 Asian Games	Thailand	**1–2**	**Vietnam**	(South Korea) Goyang Stadium, Goyang	Nisa 51'	Nguyễn Thị Liễu 53'; Nguyễn Thị Tuyết Dung 67'
25.	8 May 2015	2015 AFF Women's Championship	Vietnam	**1–2** (a.e.t.)	**Thailand**	(Vietnam) Thống Nhất Stadium, Hồ Chí Minh City	Nguyễn Thị Liễu 30'	Nisa 52', 92'
26.	22 September 2015	2016 Summer Olympics qualification	Thailand	**0–2**	**Vietnam**	(Myanmar) Mandalarthiri Stadium, Mandalay		Nguyễn Thị Minh Nguyệt 39', 83'
27.	30 July 2016	2016 AFF Women's Championship	Thailand	**0–2**	**Vietnam**	(Myanmar) Mandalarthiri Stadium, Mandalay		Huỳnh Như 85'; Nguyễn Thị Nguyệt 90+4'
28.	4 August 2016	2016 AFF Women's Championship	Vietnam	**1–1** (a.e.t.) (**5–6** p)	**Thailand**	(Myanmar) Mandalarthiri Stadium, Mandalay	Nguyễn Thị Minh Nguyệt 85'	Rattikan 7'
29.	22 August 2017	2017 Southeast Asian Games	Vietnam	**1–1**	Thailand	(Malaysia) UiTM Stadium, Shah Alam	Phạm Hải Yến 11'	Rattikan 41'
30.	24 January 2018	2018 Four Nations Tournament	**Thailand**	**2–0**	Vietnam	(China) Century Lotus Stadium, Foshan	Taneekarn 83'; Kanjana 90' (pen.)	
31.	19 August 2018	2018 Asian Games	**Vietnam**	**3–2**	Thailand	(Indonesia) Bumi Sriwijaya Stadium, Palembang	Nguyễn Thị Tuyết Dung 22'; Nguyễn Thị Vạn 33'; Nguyễn Thị Liễu 40'	Suchawadee 30' (pen.); Pitsamai 79'
32.	27 August 2019	2019 AFF Women's Championship	Thailand	**0–1** (a.e.t.)	**Vietnam**	(Thailand) IPE Chonburi Stadium 1, Chonburi		Huỳnh Như 93'
33.	26 November 2019	2019 Southeast Asian Games	Vietnam	**1–1**	Thailand	(Philippines) Biñan Football Stadium, Biñan	Dương Thị Vân 45+1'	Taneekarn 87'
34.	8 December 2019	2019 Southeast Asian Games	Thailand	**0–1** (a.e.t.)	**Vietnam**	(Philippines) Rizal Memorial Stadium, Manila		Phạm Hải Yến 92'
35.	2 February 2022	2022 AFC Women's Asian Cup	Thailand	**0–2**	**Vietnam**	(India) DY Patil Stadium, Navi Mumbai		Huỳnh Như 19'; Thái Thị Thảo 24'
36.	21 May 2022	2021 Southeast Asian Games	**Vietnam**	**1–0**	Thailand	(Vietnam) Cẩm Phả Stadium, Cẩm Phả	Huỳnh Như 59'	
37.	12 August 2025	2025 ASEAN Women's Championship	**Vietnam**	**1–0**	Thailand	(Vietnam) Lạch Tray Stadium, Hải Phòng	Trần Thị Thu Thảo 36'	
38.	19 August 2025	2025 ASEAN Women's Championship	**Vietnam**	**3–1**	Thailand	(Vietnam) Lạch Tray Stadium, Hải Phòng	Phạm Hải Yến 45'; Huỳnh Như 65'; Nguyễn Thị Bích Thùy 68'	Wiranya 87'
39.	21 September 2026	2026 Asian Games	Vietnam	**0–0**	Thailand	(Japan) Nagai Stadium, Osaka		

=== Statistics ===
==== Honours ====
Vietnam	Competition	Thailand
**Southeast Asia, Asia and Worldwide**
3	ASEAN Women's Championship	4
8	Southeast Asian Games	5
Best: Quarterfinals	AFC Women's Asian Cup	Best: Champion
Best: Fourth place	Asian Games	Best: Quarterfinals
Best: Group stage	FIFA Women's World Cup	Best: Group stage
–	Summer Olympics	–

==== Top scorers ====
As of 21 September 2026

Players in bold are still active for the national team

Rank	Player	Goals
1	**Huỳnh Như**	5
1	Nisa Romyen	5
2	Nguyễn Thị Minh Nguyệt	4
2	**Kanjana Sungngoen**	4
4	**Phạm Hải Yến**	3
4	Nguyễn Thị Tuyết Dung	3
4	**Nguyễn Thị Liễu**	3
4	**Pitsamai Sornsai**	3

== See also ==
- Indonesia–Malaysia football rivalry
- List of association football rivalries
