= Carlos Roberto =

Brazilian footballer and manager (born 1948)

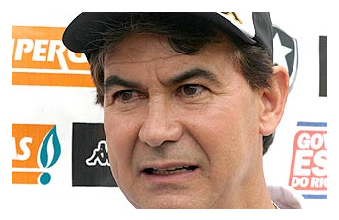

Personal information
- Full name: Carlos Roberto de Carvalho
- Date of birth: 1 May 1948 (age 78)
- Place of birth: Rio de Janeiro, Brazil

Senior career*
Years	Team	Apps	(Gls)
1967–1975	Botafogo	442	(15)
1976–1978	Santos	32	(0)
1978	Atlético Paranaense		
1979	Fluminense		
1980–1981	Bangu	16	(0)
1981	Bonsucesso		
1982	CSA	6	(0)

International career
1968	Brazil	2	

Managerial career
- 1982: Bonsucesso
- 1983: Madureira
- 1989–1991: Thailand
- 1996–1997: Al Shabab
- 1997–1998: Al-Ansar
- 2002: América Mineiro
- 2003–2004: Thailand
- 2004: Rio Branco
- 2005–2006: Botafogo
- 2007: America
- 2008: Madureira
- 2009: Thailand U17
- 2009: Bangkok Glass (technical director)
- 2010: Bangkok Glass
- 2011: Muangthong United
- 2014: Police United
- 2015–2016: Al-Tai
- * Club domestic league appearances and goals

Carlos Roberto de Carvalho, also known as Carlos Roberto (born 1 May 1948), is a Brazilian manager and former footballer who played in the 1960s and 1970s. He played as midfielder.

== Career ==
=== Player ===
He was first selected for the Brazil national football team at the age of 21. Although he was not selected to the squad for the 1970 FIFA World Cup finals, he was part of manager Zagallo's build-up to the finals.

After Botafogo, he played for Santos, Atlético Paranaense, Bangu and CSA, where he finished his playing career.

=== Trainer ===
Carlos became the trainer for Al-Thai of Saudi Arabia. It was his first experience in the Middle East and he was very successful. He returned to Brazil to train America-MG. His international experience continued when he went to Asia to command the Thailand national team.

He returned to Saudi Arabia to train Al Shabab FC (Riyadh) . Back in Minas Gerais he trained time to command Rio Branco. Then he went for the third time to Saudi Arabia, to train Al-Ansar SC and later Al Shabab FC (Riyadh).

Next he became manager for Alvinegro. Moving again, he worked in the Arab Emirates. On 4 March 2007, Carlos Robert became the manager of America Football Club (RJ). In 2008, he commanded the Madureira in the Carioca Championship, having left the position to work in the exterior.

Carlos took charge of Thailand Premier League side Bangkok Glass in June 2009 as a technical director and in 2010 as a head coach.

He took the head coaching job for Muangthong United after René Desaeyere in January 2011. However, his Muangthong United lost on penalties to Indonesia's Sriwijaya in the 2011 AFC Champions League qualifying play-off, eliminating them from the tournament.

== Honours ==
Botafogo

- Taça Guanabara: 2006
- Campeonato Carioca: 2006

Bangkok Glass

- Singapore Cup: 2010
