= Romano Mattè =

Italian football educator (born 1939)

Personal information
- Full name: Romano Mattè
- Date of birth: 17 January 1939 (age 87)
- Place of birth: Italy

Managerial career
- Years: Team
- 1964–1966: Folgore Verona (youth)
- Vicenza Calcio (youth and assistant)
- 1969–1971: Associazione Calcio Audace (it)
- Trento
- Bolzano
- 1971–1972: Alense
- 1971–1973: Oltrisarco
- 1974–1975: Legnago Salus
- 1975–1976: Sant'Angelo
- 1976: Seregno
- 1977: Calcio Padova
- 1978: U.S. Alessandria Calcio 1912
- 1978–1979: Treviso
- 1979–1980: Piacenza
- 1980–1981: Avellino (preparer)
- 1981–1982: Salernitana
- 1982–1983: Ternana
- 1983–1984: Siena
- 1985: A.S.D. Francavilla
- 1986: Benevento
- 1986–1988: Livorno
- 1989–1990: Teramo
- 1990–1991: Riccione
- 1992: A.C. Cuneo 1905
- Indonesia youth
- 1993–1996: Indonesia
- 2000–2001: Mali

Romano Mattè (born 17 January 1939) is an Italian football educator who led the Mali national team from 2000 to 2001. Besides Italy, he managed in Indonesia and Mali.

== Career ==
=== Indonesia ===
Mattè was born in Italy. He was called to Indonesia to direct the Under-18, Under-21, and pre-Olympic selections in the 1990s on a deal between Sampdoria and the Football Association of Indonesia, Matte was in charge of the Garuda for the 1995 Southeast Asian Games, calling up youngsters such as Kurniawan Dwi Yulianto and Kurnia Sandy who later went to Sampdoria through Matte. Assisted by Danurwindo as well as Harry Tjong, the retiree was said to have been paid around 17 million Indonesian rupiahs each month. Recalling his experience there, he admired the locals respect for him and their humility.

=== Mali ===
Introduced as Mali Mali national team coach in summer 2000, the Italian stated that football there used to be intertwined with superstition and that clubs had their own witch doctors, appreciating the passion for the sport in the country as well. However, his time there ended early in 2001 and he watched Les Aigles get the better of South Africa 2–0 before going to Italy.
