= Bernd Schumm =

German footballer

Personal information
- Date of birth: 21 October 1949 (age 77)

Managerial career
- Years: Team
- 1982: TSV 1860 Munich
- 1988–1989: SK Austria Klagenfurt
- 1989–1990: Blau-Weiß 1890 Berlin
- 1990: SpVgg Bayreuth
- 1993–1994: Selangor FA
- 1999: Indonesia

Bernd Schumm (born 21 October 1949) was a German football manager.Schumm had a longest management stint in SK Austria Klagenfurt and last managed Indonesia national team in 1999.
