= List of international goals scored by Abdul Kadir =

Kadir has scored 70 international goals since making his debut for Indonesia in 1967

Abdul Kadir was a footballer who represented the Indonesia national football team as a winger. He scored his first international goal in his debut match during the Merdeka Tournament, an international friendly competition, against South Korea on 11 August 1967. Since then, he has become Indonesia's top scorer in international football, having scored 70 goals in 111 appearances for Indonesia. On 7 November 1969, Kadir scored his first international hat-trick against Singapore during a 1969 Merdeka Tournament match. In total, he has scored three hat-tricks, two of them against Malaysia, and he has netted twice in a match on fourteen occasions.

In August 1967, Kadir received his first call-up to the senior Indonesia national team ahead of their 1967 Merdeka Tournament participation in Kuala Lumpur. He made his debut on 11 August against South Korea, also managed to score his debut goal (Indonesia's only goal in the match) in a 1–3 defeat to the opposing team.After his international debut, Kadir continued to be trusted as a key player for Indonesia and has won many titles until his retirement. He played more than 100 international matches and score more than 70 international goals (including non 'A' match) for Indonesia national team as recognised by football statistic organisations RSSSF. He made his century of appearances for Indonesia against India in the Merdeka Tournament in Ipoh, Malaysia on 1 August 1974 – the match ended in a goalless draw. In total, he has made 111 appearances for the national team, making him the most capped player of all time for Indonesia. His 70 goals are also the most of all time for the Indonesia national team.

== Goals ==
As of 7 May 1979
Indonesia score listed first, score column indicates score after each Kadir goal.

International goals by cap, date, venue, opponent, score, result and competition
No.	Cap	Date	Venue	Opponent	Score	Result	Competition	Ref
1	1	11 August 1967	Merdeka Stadium, Kuala Lumpur, Malaysia	South Korea	1–3	1–3	1967 Merdeka Tournament	
2	2	13 August 1967	Perak Stadium, Ipoh, Malaysia	Singapore	2–0	4–1	1967 Merdeka Tournament	
3	7	15 August 1968	Merdeka Stadium, Kuala Lumpur, Malaysia	Singapore	2–0	4–0	1968 Merdeka Tournament	
4	8	17 August 1968	Perak Stadium, Ipoh, Malaysia	South Korea	2–0	4–2	1968 Merdeka Tournament	
5	8	17 August 1968	Perak Stadium, Ipoh, Malaysia	South Korea	3–1	4–2	1968 Merdeka Tournament	
6	9	19 August 1968	Merdeka Stadium, Kuala Lumpur, Malaysia	Taiwan	5–1	10–1	1968 Merdeka Tournament	
7	9	19 August 1968	Merdeka Stadium, Kuala Lumpur, Malaysia	Taiwan	6–1	10–1	1968 Merdeka Tournament	
8	11	21 November 1968	Suphachalasai Stadium, Bangkok, Thailand	Malaysia	1–0	1–0	1968 King's Cup	
9	12	25 November 1968	Suphachalasai Stadium, Bangkok, Thailand	Burma	2–1	3–1	1968 King's Cup	
10	12	25 November 1968	Suphachalasai Stadium, Bangkok, Thailand	Burma	3–1	3–1	1968 King's Cup	
11	13	27 November 1968	Suphachalasai Stadium, Bangkok, Thailand	Singapore	1–0	7–0	1968 King's Cup	
12	16	1 November 1969	Perak Stadium, Ipoh, Malaysia	Thailand	4–0	4–0	1969 Merdeka Tournament	
13	17	3 November 1969	Merdeka Stadium, Kuala Lumpur, Malaysia	Malaysia	1–0	3–1	1969 Merdeka Tournament	
14	17	3 November 1969	Merdeka Stadium, Kuala Lumpur, Malaysia	Malaysia	3–0	3–1	1969 Merdeka Tournament	
15	18	7 November 1969	Merdeka Stadium, Kuala Lumpur, Malaysia	Singapore	3–0	9–2	1969 Merdeka Tournament	
16	18	7 November 1969	Merdeka Stadium, Kuala Lumpur, Malaysia	Singapore	5–0	9–2	1969 Merdeka Tournament	
17	18	7 November 1969	Merdeka Stadium, Kuala Lumpur, Malaysia	Singapore	6–0	9–2	1969 Merdeka Tournament	
18	20	19 November 1969	Suphachalasai Stadium, Bangkok, Thailand	Singapore	2–2	2–3	1969 King's Cup	
19	24	1 August 1970	Merdeka Stadium, Kuala Lumpur, Malaysia	Singapore	3–0	3–1	1970 Merdeka Tournament	
20	25	4 August 1970	Penang Island National Stadium, Penang, Malaysia	Hong Kong	3–1	3–1	1970 Merdeka Tournament	
21	26	6 August 1970	Merdeka Stadium, Kuala Lumpur, Malaysia	South Korea	1–1	1–2	1970 Merdeka Tournament	
22	27	8 August 1970	Merdeka Stadium, Kuala Lumpur, Malaysia	Japan	3–2	3–4	1970 Merdeka Tournament	
23	28	10 August 1970	Merdeka Stadium, Kuala Lumpur, Malaysia	Thailand	6–3	6–3	1970 Merdeka Tournament	
24	30	9 November 1970	Suphachalasai Stadium, Bangkok, Thailand	South Vietnam	4–2	5–3	1970 King's Cup	
25	30	9 November 1970	Suphachalasai Stadium, Bangkok, Thailand	South Vietnam	5–2	5–3	1970 King's Cup	
26	31	13 November 1970	Suphachalasai Stadium, Bangkok, Thailand	Malaysia	1–0	3–0	1970 King's Cup	
27	31	13 November 1970	Suphachalasai Stadium, Bangkok, Thailand	Malaysia	2–0	3–0	1970 King's Cup	
28	39	19 December 1970	Suphachalasai Stadium, Bangkok, Thailand	Thailand	1–0	1–0	1970 Asian Games	
29	41	5 May 1971	Dongdaemun Stadium, Seoul, South Korea	Hong Kong	2–0	2–1	1971 President's Cup	
30	42	8 May 1971	Dongdaemun Stadium, Seoul, South Korea	Burma	1–0	1–3	1971 President's Cup	
31	45	5 June 1971	Gelora Senayan Main Stadium, Jakarta, Indonesia	Singapore	3–0	3–0	1971 Jakarta Anniversary Tournament	
32	46	7 June 1971	Gelora Senayan Main Stadium, Jakarta, Indonesia	Burma	1–1	1–1	1971 Jakarta Anniversary Tournament	
33	48	13 June 1971	Gelora Senayan Main Stadium, Jakarta, Indonesia	Khmer Republic	1–0	1–0	1971 Jakarta Anniversary Tournament	
34	52	9 August 1971	Merdeka Stadium, Kuala Lumpur, Malaysia	Burma	1–1	2–2	1971 Merdeka Tournament	
35	52	9 August 1971	Merdeka Stadium, Kuala Lumpur, Malaysia	Burma	2–1	2–2	1971 Merdeka Tournament	
36	54	13 August 1971	Perak Stadium, Ipoh, Malaysia	Singapore	3–0	4–0	1971 Merdeka Tournament	
37	59	27 August 1971	National Stadium, Singapore	Singapore	1–1	2–3	1971 Pesta Sukan	
38	60	10 November 1971	Suphachalasai Stadium, Bangkok, Thailand	Malaysia	2–0	2–0	1971 King's Cup	
39	64	20 March 1972	Bogyoke Aung San Stadium, Rangoon, Burma	Thailand	4–0	4–0	1972 Olympic Games qualification	
40	65	25 March 1972	Bogyoke Aung San Stadium, Rangoon, Burma	India	4–1	4–2	1972 Olympic Games qualification	
41	69	7 June 1972	Gelora Senayan Main Stadium, Jakarta, Indonesia	Laos	2–1	5–1	1972 Jakarta Anniversary Tournament	
42	69	7 June 1972	Gelora Senayan Main Stadium, Jakarta, Indonesia	Laos	2–1	5–1	1972 Jakarta Anniversary Tournament	
43	70	11 June 1972	Gelora Senayan Main Stadium, Jakarta, Indonesia	Sri Lanka	1	8–0	1972 Jakarta Anniversary Tournament	
44	70	11 June 1972	Gelora Senayan Main Stadium, Jakarta, Indonesia	Sri Lanka	2	8–0	1972 Jakarta Anniversary Tournament	
45	71	13 June 1972	Gelora Senayan Main Stadium, Jakarta, Indonesia	Malaysia	1–0	3–0	1972 Jakarta Anniversary Tournament	
46	71	13 June 1972	Gelora Senayan Main Stadium, Jakarta, Indonesia	Malaysia	3–0	3–0	1972 Jakarta Anniversary Tournament	
47	72	17 June 1972	Gelora Senayan Main Stadium, Jakarta, Indonesia	Khmer Republic	3–0	4–0	1972 Jakarta Anniversary Tournament	
48	73	2 August 1972	National Stadium, Singapore	Philippines	2–0	3–0	1972 Pesta Sukan	
49	75	8 August 1972	National Stadium, Singapore	Khmer Republic	2–0	5–0	1972 Pesta Sukan	
50	75	8 August 1972	National Stadium, Singapore	Khmer Republic	3–0	5–0	1972 Pesta Sukan	
51	76	21 September 1972	Dongdaemun Stadium, Seoul, South Korea	Singapore	1–0	2–1	1972 President's Cup	
52	76	21 September 1972	Dongdaemun Stadium, Seoul, South Korea	Singapore	2–1	2–1	1972 President's Cup	
53	78	25 September 1972	Dongdaemun Stadium, Seoul, South Korea	Philippines	1	12–0	1972 President's Cup	
54	78	25 September 1972	Dongdaemun Stadium, Seoul, South Korea	Philippines	2	12–0	1972 President's Cup	
55	79	28 September 1972	Dongdaemun Stadium, Seoul, South Korea	Malaysia	2–1	3–1	1972 President's Cup	
56	79	28 September 1972	Dongdaemun Stadium, Seoul, South Korea	Malaysia	3–1	3–1	1972 President's Cup	
57	81	7 October 1972	Gelora Senayan Main Stadium, Jakarta, Indonesia	Australia	1–3	1–4	Friendly	
58	82	11 October 1972	Gelora Senayan Main Stadium, Jakarta, Indonesia	New Zealand	1–1	1–1	Friendly	
59	90	24 September 1973	Dongdaemun Stadium, Seoul, South Korea	South Korea	1–1	1–3	1973 President's Cup	
60	91	26 September 1973	Dongdaemun Stadium, Seoul, South Korea	Khmer Republic	2–3	2–3	1973 President's Cup	
61	92	19 April 1974	Gelora Senayan Main Stadium, Jakarta, Indonesia	Uruguay	1–0	2–1	Friendly	
62	93	21 April 1974	Gelora Senayan Main Stadium, Jakarta, Indonesia	Uruguay	2–3	2–3	Friendly	
63	95	1 June 1974	Gelora Senayan Main Stadium, Jakarta, Indonesia	Burma	1–1	2–4	1974 Jakarta Anniversary Tournament	
64	96	7 June 1974	Gelora Senayan Main Stadium, Jakarta, Indonesia	Malaysia	1–0	4–3	1974 Jakarta Anniversary Tournament	
65	96	7 June 1974	Gelora Senayan Main Stadium, Jakarta, Indonesia	Malaysia	3–1	4–3	1974 Jakarta Anniversary Tournament	
66	96	7 June 1974	Gelora Senayan Main Stadium, Jakarta, Indonesia	Malaysia	4–3	4–3	1974 Jakarta Anniversary Tournament	
67	99	28 July 1974	Perak Stadium, Ipoh, Malaysia	Singapore	5–0	5–0	1974 Merdeka Tournament	
68	101	13 June 1978	Gelora Senayan Main Stadium, Jakarta, Indonesia	Malaysia	1–0	3–0	1978 Jakarta Anniversary Tournament	
69	101	13 June 1978	Gelora Senayan Main Stadium, Jakarta, Indonesia	Malaysia	2–0	3–0	1978 Jakarta Anniversary Tournament	
70	101	13 June 1978	Gelora Senayan Main Stadium, Jakarta, Indonesia	Malaysia	3–0	3–0	1978 Jakarta Anniversary Tournament	

== Hat-tricks ==
No.	Date	Venue	Opponent	Goals	Result	Competition	Ref.
1	7 November 1969	Merdeka Stadium, Kuala Lumpur, Malaysia	Singapore	3 – (15', 60', 85')	9–2	1969 Merdeka Tournament	
2	7 June 1974	Gelora Senayan Main Stadium, Jakarta, Indonesia	Malaysia	3 – (44', 63', 84')	4–3	1974 Jakarta Anniversary Tournament	
3	13 June 1978	Gelora Senayan Main Stadium, Jakarta, Indonesia	Malaysia	3 – (10', 13', 90')	3–0	1978 Jakarta Anniversary Tournament	

== Statistics ==
Goals by year
National team	Year	Apps	Goals
Indonesia	1967	6	2
Indonesia	1968	9	9
Indonesia	1969	8	7
Indonesia	1970	16	10
Indonesia	1971	24	10
Indonesia	1972	19	20
Indonesia	1973	9	2
Indonesia	1974	9	7
Indonesia	1978	8	3
Indonesia	1979	3	0
Total		111	70

Goals by competition
Competition	Goals
Merdeka Tournament	22
Jakarta Anniversary Tournament	17
King's Cup	10
President's Cup	10
Friendlies	4
Pesta Sukan Cup	4
Summer Olympics qualifiers	2
Asian Games	1
Total	70

Goals by opponent
Opponent	Goals
Malaysia	16
Singapore	14
Burma	7
Khmer Republic	5
South Korea	5
Thailand	4
Philippines	3
Laos	2
Hong Kong	2
South Vietnam	2
Sri Lanka	2
Taiwan	2
Uruguay	2
Australia	1
India	1
Japan	1
New Zealand	1
Total	70

== See also ==
- List of top international men's football goalscorers by country
- List of men's footballers with 50 or more international goals
