= Indonesia national football team =

Men's football team

Indonesia
- Nickname(s): Tim Garuda (Garuda Team); Timnas (The National Team); Merah Putih (The Red and White)
- Association: PSSI (Football Association of Indonesia)
- Confederation: AFC (Asia)
- Sub-confederation: AFF (Southeast Asia)
- Head coach: John Herdman
- Captain: Jay Idzes
- Most caps: Abdul Kadir (111)
- Top scorer: Abdul Kadir (70)
- Home stadium: Gelora Bung Karno Stadium
- FIFA code: IDN
First colours	Second colours

FIFA ranking
- Current: 116 ▲2 (18 November 2026)
- Highest: 76 (September 1998)
- Lowest: 191 (July 2016)

First international
- as Dutch East Indies; Dutch East Indies 7–1 Japan (Manila, Philippines; 13 May 1934) as Indonesia; India 3–0 Indonesia (New Delhi, India; 5 March 1951)

Biggest win
- Philippines 1–13 Indonesia (Jakarta, Indonesia; 23 December 2002)

Biggest defeat
- Bahrain 10–0 Indonesia (Riffa, Bahrain; 29 February 2012)

World Cup
- Appearances: 1 (first in 1938)
- Best result: Round of 16 (1938)

Asian Cup
- Appearances: 6 (first in 1996)
- Best result: Round of 16 (2023)

ASEAN Cup
- Appearances: 1 (first in 2026)
- Best result: Champions (2026)

ASEAN Championship
- Appearances: 15 (first in 1996)
- Best result: Runners-up (2000, 2002, 2004, 2010, 2016, 2020)
Medal record
Men's football
Asian Games
Bronze medal – third place	1958 Tokyo	Team
FIFA ASEAN Cup
Gold medal – first place	2026 Indonesia	Team
ASEAN Championship
Silver medal – second place	2000 Thailand	Team
Silver medal – second place	2002 Indonesia and Singapore	Team
Silver medal – second place	2004 Malaysia and Vietnam	Team
Silver medal – second place	2010 Indonesia and Vietnam	Team
Silver medal – second place	2016 Myanmar and Philippines	Team
Silver medal – second place	2020 Singapore	Team
Bronze medal – third place	1998 Vietnam	Team
SEA Games
Gold medal – first place	1987 Jakarta	Team
Gold medal – first place	1991 Manila	Team
Silver medal – second place	1979 Jakarta	Team
Silver medal – second place	1997 Jakarta	Team
Bronze medal – third place	1981 Manila	Team
Bronze medal – third place	1989 Kuala Lumpur	Team
Bronze medal – third place	1999 Bandar Seri Begawan	Team
- Website: PSSI.org

The Indonesia national football team (Indonesian: Tim nasional sepak bola Indonesia) represents Indonesia in international men's football matches since 1951. The men's national team is controlled by the Football Association of Indonesia (PSSI), the governing body for football in Indonesia, which is a part of AFC, under the jurisdiction of FIFA. Most of Indonesia home matches are played at the Gelora Bung Karno Stadium.

The team is colloquially referred to as Tim Garuda (Garuda Team), Timnas (National Team) or Merah Putih (The Red and White) after the country's national emblem and their distinctive red-and-white jerseys based on the country's flag. Their dedicated fan clubs are known as La Grande Indonesia and Ultras Garuda.

Indonesia was the first team from Asia to participate in the FIFA World Cup. The predecessor of the team, Dutch East Indies, participated in the 1938 edition, where they were eliminated in the first round. The team's only appearance at the Olympics was in 1956. Indonesia qualified for the AFC Asian Cup on six occasions, and advanced to the knockout stage for the first time in the 2023 tournament, exiting in the round of 16. Indonesia achieved the bronze medal at the 1958 Asian Games in Tokyo. The team finished runners-up in the ASEAN Championship six times. They hosted and won the inaugural FIFA ASEAN Cup in 2026. Indonesia has long-standing football rivalries with neighbours Malaysia, Thailand and Vietnam.

== History ==
=== 1921–1938: Colonial era ===
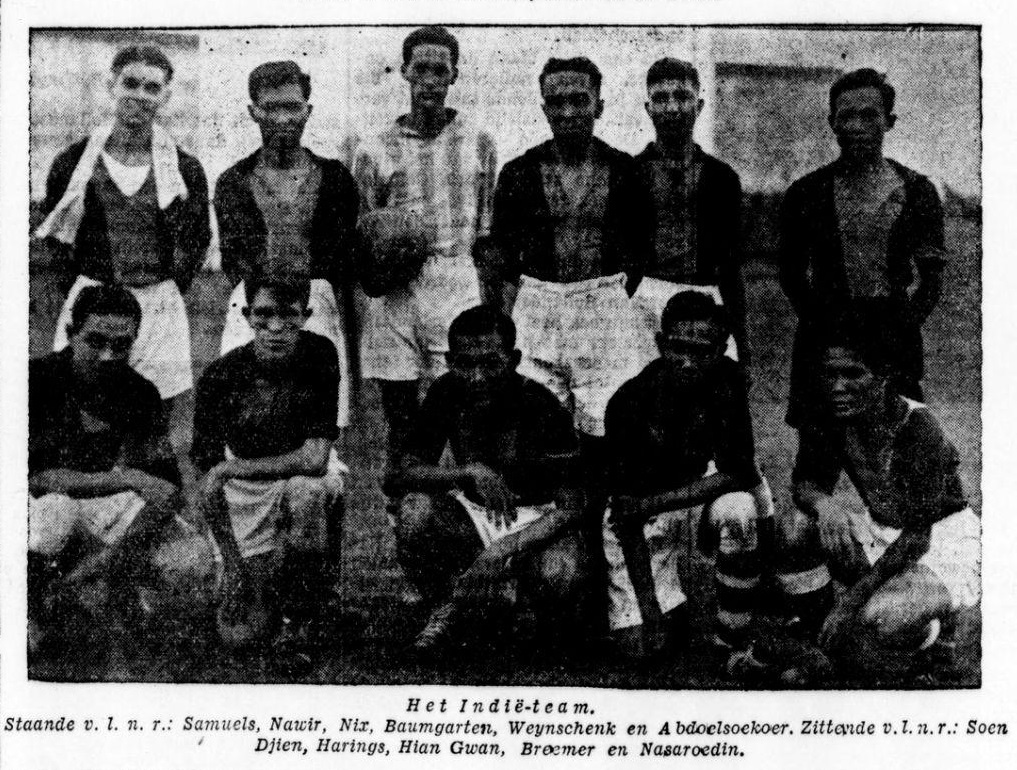
Dutch East Indies squad's pioneer, the predecessor of the Indonesia national team

Dutch East Indies, or Netherlands East Indies was the national team that represented the territory of present-day Indonesia during the Dutch colonial era. The team was organized by the Dutch East Indies Football Union (NIVU), which became a member of FIFA on 24 May 1924. The first recorded unofficial match of the Dutch East Indies was against Singapore on 28 March 1921 in Batavia, which ended in a 1–0 win. This was followed by matches in August 1928 against Australia (2–1 win) and in 1930 against a team from Shanghai, China (4–4 draw).

On 19 April 1930, Football Association of Indonesia (PSSI) was founded with Soeratin Sosrosoegondo as the first leader, after most all non-national organizations in the country such as VIJ Jakarta, BIVB Bandung, PSM Mataram, IVBM Magelang, VVB Solo, MVB Madiun, and SIVB Surabaya gathered at a meeting in Soerakarta and agreed to form the second national football organization in order to resist the Dutch control of the colonies by gathering all the footballers to play under PSSI.

In 1934, a team from Java represented the Dutch East Indies in the Far Eastern Games in Manila, Philippines. The team managed to beat Japan 7–1 in the first match, but the last two matches ended in defeat, 0–2 to China and 2–3 to the Philippines, resulting in the team finishing second in the tournament. These matches are considered by World Football Elo Ratings to be the first matches involving the Indonesia national team. On 9 June 1935, two national organizations, NIVU and PSSI, joined forces and worked together to contribute players to the national team. NIVU remained the official football association of the Dutch East Indies and was admitted to FIFA membership on 14 August 1936, after first becoming a member in 1924.

=== 1938–1945: Asia's first FIFA World Cup participant ===
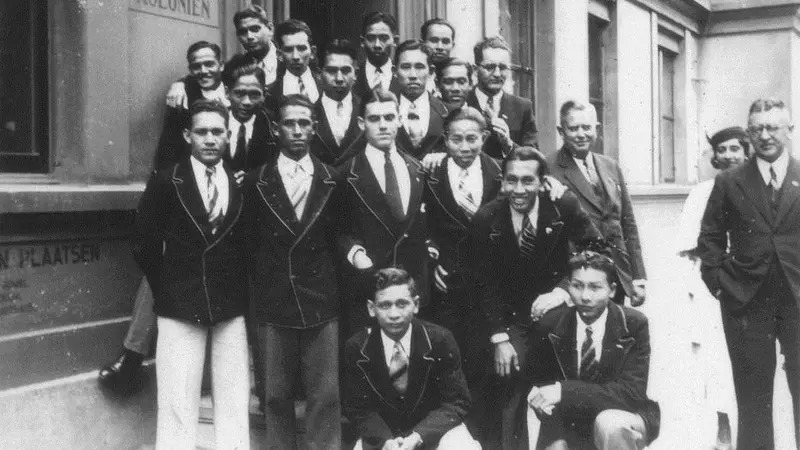
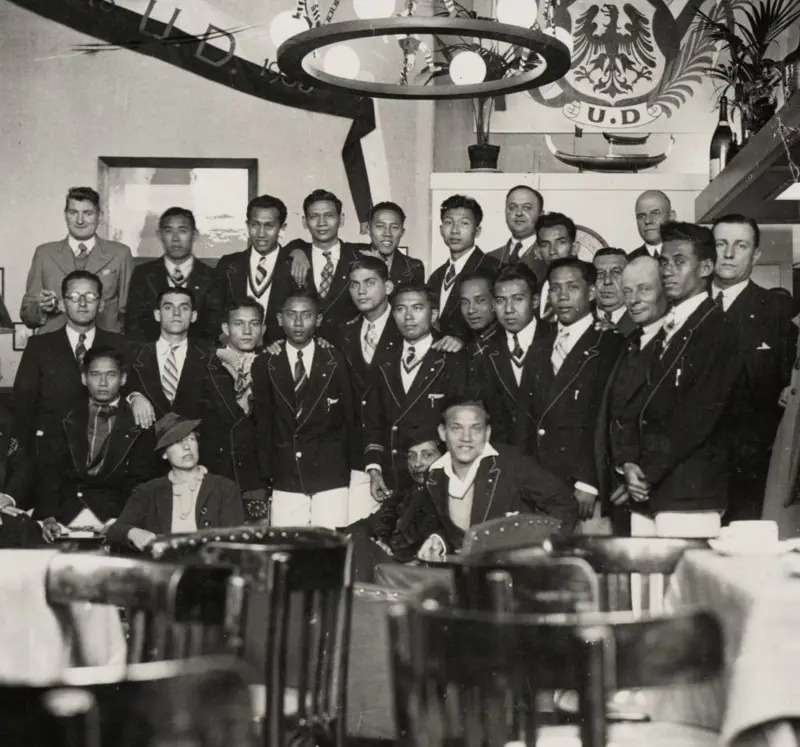
Dutch East Indies squad for the 1938 edition of the World Cup

Dutch East Indies made its FIFA World Cup debut during the 1938 edition in France. The team advanced to the final round without playing any qualifying matches. Japan, who were drawn in Group 12 of the qualifying round with the Dutch East Indies, decided to withdraw from the competition. The Dutch East Indies were then ordered by FIFA to carry out a play-off match against one of the Group 11 participants, the United States. The match was scheduled to be played on 29 May 1938, but never took place after the United States also decided to withdraw from the competition. This allowed the Dutch East Indies to advance to the final round as Asia's first World Cup participant.

In the final round, the Dutch East Indies were coached by Johan Mastenbroek who also served as chairman of the Dutch East Indies Football Association (NIVU). The team consisted of 17 players and was captained by a local Indonesian, Achmad Nawir. In the competition which still used the knockout format, the Dutch East Indies were eliminated in the first round when they were defeated by Hungary 0–6. This match took place on 5 June 1938 at the Stade Municipal, Reims. At the end of the competition, Hungary who had previously eliminated the Dutch East Indies, became the runner-up of the competition after being defeated by Italy 2–4 in the final. Before Curaçao in 2026, the Dutch East Indies had been the only team to have qualified for a FIFA World Cup before becoming an independent nation.

=== 1949–1984: Independence era ===
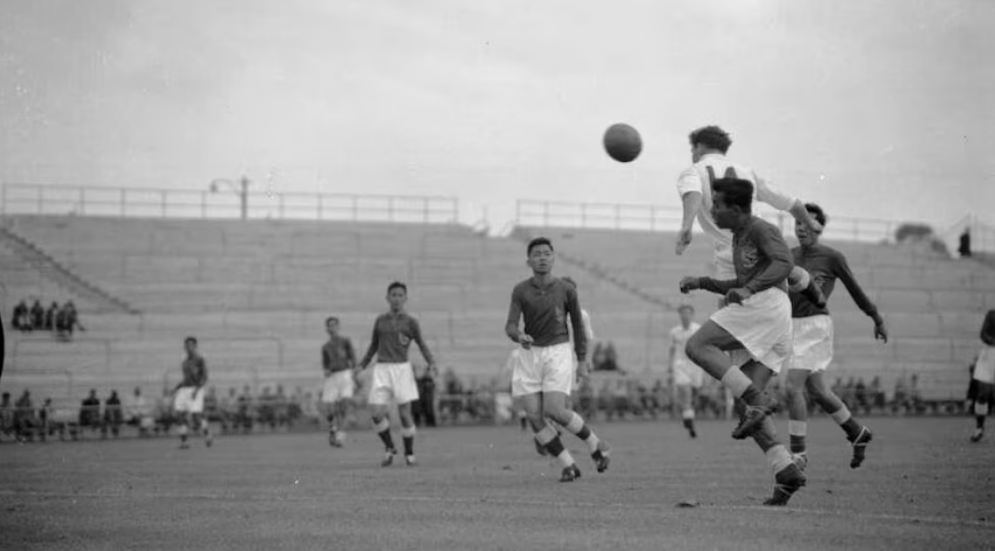
Indonesia's match against the Soviet Union at the 1956 Summer Olympics in Melbourne. The match ended in a goalless draw

After the Second World War, followed by the Indonesian Revolution in 1947, the national team no longer used the name Dutch East Indies and replacing it with the name Indonesia. The previous national football organization, the Dutch East Indies Football Union (NIVU) was succeeded by the Football Association of Indonesia (PSSI). The team's first official match under the name Indonesia was on 5 March 1951 at the Asian Games, where they lost 0–3 by the host nation India at the National Stadium, New Delhi.

Indonesia qualified for the 1956 Olympics in Melbourne. The team advanced directly to the quarter-finals of the tournament after the withdrawal of their first-round opponents, South Vietnam. In the quarter-finals, the team met the Soviet Union who had previously defeated the United Team of Germany 2–1. The match was held on 29 November 1956, where Indonesia forced the Soviet Union to a goalless draw. This resulted the match being replayed two days later where the team lost 0–4.

In 1957, Indonesia dominated the qualifying round of the 1958 FIFA World Cup. The team defeated China in the first round, then subsequently refused to play its next opponents, Israel, for political reasons. Indonesian player Rusli Ramang became the top scorer at the end of the competition with 4 goals.

Indonesia won the bronze medal at the 1958 Asian Games where the team beat India 4–1 in the third-place match. The team also drew 2–2 with East Germany in a friendly match. Indonesia won Merdeka Tournament trophy on three occasions (1961, 1962 and 1969). The team were also champions of the 1968 King's Cup. Indonesia returned to World Cup qualification rounds in 1974 as the team was eliminated in the first round, with only one win from six matches, against New Zealand. During the qualification round of 1978 FIFA World Cup, Indonesia won a single of four matches, against the host team, Singapore. Four years later, in 1982, Indonesia won two FIFA World Cup qualifying matches, over Chinese Taipei and Australia.

=== 1985–1995: Renaissance of Indonesia football ===
The 1986 FIFA World Cup qualification round saw Indonesia advance from the first round with four wins, one draw, and one loss, eventually finishing at the top of its group. South Korea emerged victorious over Indonesia in the second round. The team reached the semi-final of the 1986 Asian Games after beating the United Arab Emirates in the quarter-finals. Indonesia then lost to host South Korea in the semi-finals and lost to Kuwait in the bronze medal match.

A milestone during this era was the gold medal victory at the Southeast Asian Games in both 1987 and 1991. In 1987, Indonesia beat Malaysia 1–0; while in 1991, it beat Thailand in a penalty shoot-out. In the 1990 FIFA World Cup qualifiers, the Indonesian team lost in the first round, with only one win against Hong Kong, three draws and two defeats. The team also only managed a single victory against Vietnam in the 1994 FIFA World Cup qualification round.

=== 1995–2016: Continental appearances ===
==== 1996 AFC Asian Cup ====
Indonesia's first appearance in the AFC Asian Cup was against United Arab Emirates in the 1996 AFC Asian Cup. During the tournament, Indonesia only scored a single point from a 2–2 draw against Kuwait in the first round.

==== 1998 Tiger Cup ====
In the final group stage match of the 1998 Tiger Cup, Indonesia faced Thailand while the both teams already through to the semi-finals, but were also aware that the winner would have to face hosts Vietnam. Indonesia's Mursyid Effendi deliberately kicked the ball into Indonesia's own goal as Thailand's attacker ran towards the ball. FIFA fined both teams $40,000 for "violating the spirit of the game" while Effendi was banned from international association football for a lifetime. Indonesia was rewarded with a match by the team they wanted to face; minnows Singapore (who they ironically lost 2–1 to) in the semi-finals.

==== 2000 AFC Asian Cup ====
The team's second appearance in the Asian Cup was in Lebanon in the 2000 AFC Asian Cup; again, the Indonesian team gained only one point from three games, and again, from a match against Kuwait that finished without a score from either side. Indonesia established a higher record in the 2004 AFC Asian Cup, beating Qatar 2–1 to record the team's first-ever victory in the history of the tournament. The win was not enough for it to qualify for the second round, having fallen 0–5 to host China and 1–3 to Bahrain.

==== 2004 AFC Asian Cup ====
Indonesia then qualified for their third successful tournament in the 2004 AFC Asian Cup being grouped with China, Qatar, and Bahrain with them winning the only match against Qatar in a 2–1 victory but crashed out of the tournament with only three points.

==== 2007 AFC Asian Cup ====
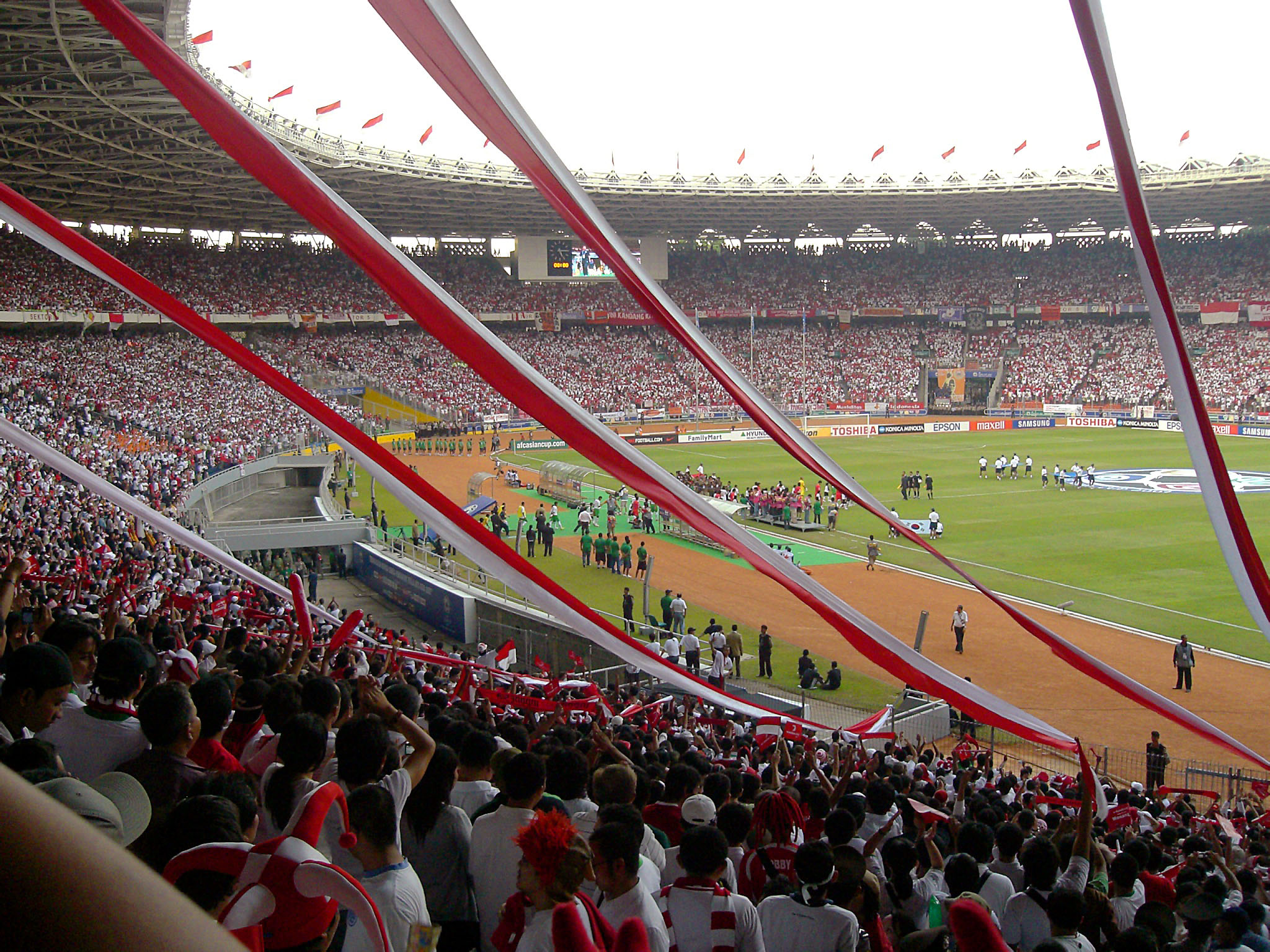
Indonesian fans at Gelora Bung Karno Stadium during the 2007 AFC Asian Cup match between Indonesia and South Korea

The 2007 AFC Asian Cup saw Indonesia co-hosting the tournament with Malaysia, Thailand and Vietnam becoming the first time in the AFC Asian Cup history that four countries co-hosted the competition. In the opening match of the tournament, Indonesia faces Bahrain with goals coming from Budi Sudarsono and Bambang Pamungkas to secure a 2–1 win. However, in the following two matches, Indonesia suffered a 2–1 defeat to Saudi Arabia and narrowly losing to South Korea 1–0 which Indonesia failed to qualified to the knockout stage of the tournament.

==== AFF Championship ====
Indonesia reached the finals of AFF Championship on six occasions (2000, 2002, 2004, 2010, 2016, and 2020), albeit never managing to lift the trophy victoriously. The team's claim of regional titles came in the Southeast Asian Games of 1987 and 1991.

After the Peter Withe era, the inability to fulfill the ASEAN target has been cited as the reason for Indonesia's "revolving door" in terms of team managers. Over two years, Indonesia's manager changed from Kolev to local coach Benny Dollo who was in turn sacked in 2010. The head coach position was then held by Alfred Riedl who failed to lift any cups and in July 2011 was then replaced by Wim Rijsbergen.

=== 2012–2016: Suspensions ===
In March 2012, PSSI received a warning for the divided state of Indonesian football, whereby two separate leagues existed: the rebel Indonesia Super League (ISL), which isn't recognized by PSSI or FIFA, and the Indonesia Premier League (IPL). The National Sports Committee (KONI) encouraged PSSI to work collaboratively with Indonesian Football Savior Committee (KPSI) officials to rectify the situation but KONI chairman Tono Suratman stated in March 2012 that KONI would take over the beleaguered PSSI if matters are not improved. FIFA did not state whether Indonesia would face suspension, but on 20 March 2012, FIFA made an announcement. In the lead-up to 20 March 2012, PSSI struggled to resolve the situation and looked to its annual congress for a final solution. PSSI was given until 15 June 2012 to settle the issues at stake, notably the control of the breakaway league; failing this, the case was to be referred to the FIFA Emergency Committee for suspension. FIFA eventually set a new 1 December 2012 deadline. In the two weeks preceding the deadline, three out of four PSSI representatives withdrew from the joint committee, citing frustrations in dealing with KPSI representatives. However, FIFA stated that it would only issue a punishment to Indonesian football after the Indonesian national squad finished its involvement in the 2012 AFF Championship.

In 2013, the president of PSSI Djohar Arifin Husin signed a Memorandum of understanding (MoU) with La Nyalla Matalitti (KPSI-PSSI) that was initiated by FIFA and the AFC through the Asian Football Confederation's Task Force. Since then, the control of Indonesia Super League was taken by the Joint committee to remain manageable by PT Liga Indonesia until the establishment of a new professional competition by the committee. This means the Indonesian players from ISL were able to play and join the national team. The PSSI called players from both football leagues, ISL and IPL to fortify the national team for the Asian Cup qualifier of 2015. On 7 January 2013, PSSI announced a list of 51 players from both sides of football leagues regardless of whether players from the breakaway Indonesia Super League (ISL) would make an appearance, allegedly ISL clubs were reluctant to release players because they doubted Djohar's leadership.

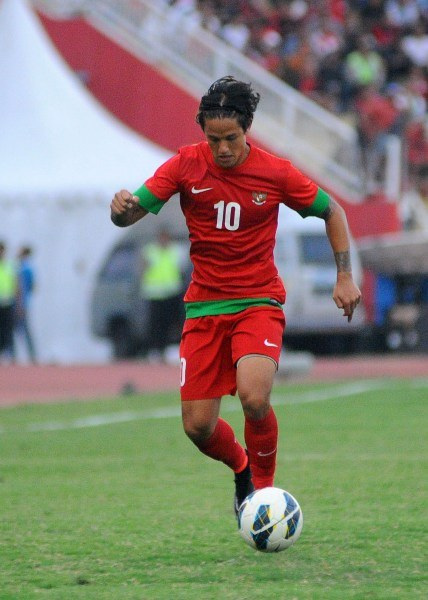
Irfan Bachdim in action during a friendly match against Malaysia at the Gelora Delta Stadium on 14 September 2014. Indonesia won 2–0

On 18 March 2013, PSSI held a congress at Kuala Lumpur, Malaysia. Both parties, PSSI and KPSI (breakaway group) solved their differences in four contentious points; such as; Reunification of two leagues; Revision of the PSSI Statutes; Reinstatement of the four expelled PSSI Executive Committee members La Nyalla Mattalitti, Roberto Rouw, Erwin Dwi Budiawan, and Toni Apriliani; and agreement of all parties to the Memorandum of Understanding from 7 June 2012 on the list of delegates to the PSSI Congress based on the list of the Solo Congress of July 2011. The new PSSI called 58 players from both sides leagues (ISL and IPL) for the national squad. Rahmad Darmawan returned as the caretaker coach of the national team with Jacksen F. Tiago as the assistant coach. They trimmed the 58 players initially called for national training to 28. The list would then be trimmed again to just 23 players for the Saudi Arabia match. Victor Igbonefo, Greg Nwokolo and Sergio van Dijk the three naturalised players were on the final list. On 23 March 2013, Indonesia was defeated 1–2 by Saudi Arabia at home. Boaz Solossa gave Indonesia the first goal in their campaign for AFC Asian Cup qualification; the home team started with the goal in the sixth minute but the Saudi Side fought back with the equalizer from Yahya Al-Shehri in the 14th minute before Yousef Al-Salem the scored what turned out to be the winner on 56th minute.

In 2015, Football Association of Indonesia (PSSI) was suspended by FIFA due to government interference in the domestic competition. The announcement was made on 30 May 2015 and had an immediate impact on the national team. Indonesia would not be eligible to compete in the next round of qualifiers for the 2018 World Cup and 2019 Asian Cup, starting less than two weeks later. FIFA took action against Indonesia following a row between the local government and the football association which has resulted in the cancellation of the domestic competition. The suspension was lifted at the 66th FIFA Congress. By then, hurried perpetration was done for Indonesia in order to get in touch for the upcoming 2016 AFF Championship where Indonesia eventually reached the final and once again fell to Thailand in process.

=== 2017–2019: Rebuilding ===
Some weeks after finishing as runners-up in the 2016 AFF Championship, PSSI held a congress on 8 January 2017 in an effort to sign Spanish coach, Luis Milla to handle their senior and U-22 team. Prior to the 2018 AFF Championship, Milla departed without any explanation, causing anger among Indonesian supporters. Indonesia crashed out from the group stage in the 2018 AFF Championship, which led to the sacking of Bima Sakti. In order to prepare for the 2022 FIFA World Cup qualification campaign, Indonesia signed Scottish coach Simon McMenemy with hope that his successful tenure with the Philippines could reinvigorate Indonesia's performance especially when Indonesia was grouped with three Southeast Asian rivals Malaysia, Thailand and Vietnam alongside UAE. Indonesia lost all four matches including a 2–3 home defeat to Malaysia despite having taken a 2–1 lead prior followed by a home loss to Vietnam for the first time in any competitive tournaments. On 6 November 2019, PSSI decided to sack McMenemy over the national team's deteriorating performance. Indonesia traveled to Malaysia and lost 0–2 to its rival and was officially eliminated from the 2022 FIFA World Cup qualification.

=== 2020–2025: Shin Tae-Yong era ===
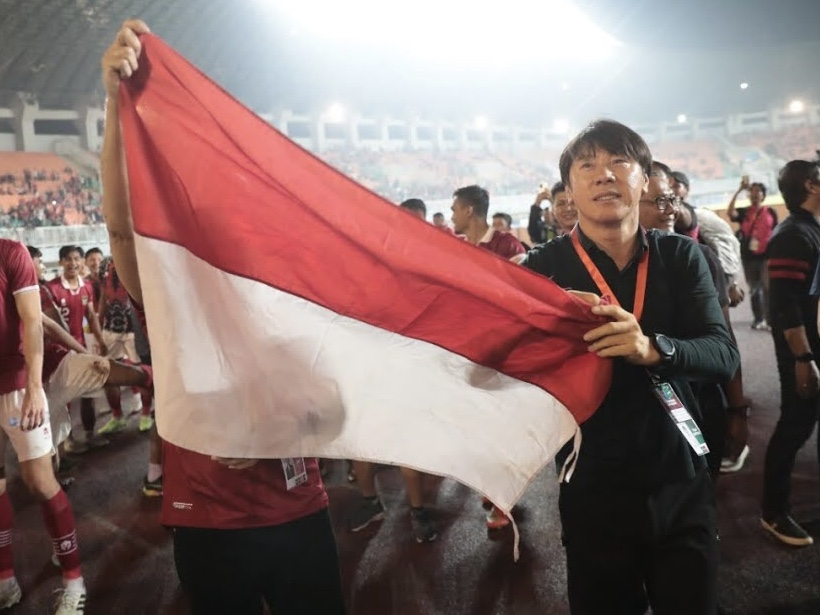
Shin Tae-yong guided Indonesia to the 2020 AFF Championship final and the 2023 AFC Asian Cup

After failing to qualify for the World Cup, PSSI appointed Shin Tae-yong as the head coach of the Indonesian national team, becoming the first South Korean in Indonesia's managerial history. This appointment was based on the success of fellow Korean coach Park Hang-seo in Vietnam. Shin was then tasked with immediately forming a team to compete in the 2023 AFC Asian Cup qualification round.

Under the management of Shin Tae-yong, the majority of the senior team was reshuffled to include many young players of whom the majority were from the Indonesia national under-23 football team. Indonesia made it to the 2020 AFF Championship final with an average player age of 23.

==== 2023 AFC Asian Cup qualification ====
In the 2023 AFC Asian Cup qualification, Indonesia defeated host and former Asian champions, Kuwait, whom they had not defeated in 42 years, 2–1, to the surprise of many people, the first official win by a Southeast Asian team against a West Asian host since 2004 (when Thailand beat Yemen 3–0 in Sanaa during the 2006 FIFA World Cup qualification), and was the first time in the history that a Southeast Asian team had won against a Persian Gulf team as the visitor. In the final match, Indonesia massively beat Nepal 7–0 at the Jaber Al-Ahmad International Stadium. Boosted by the win, Indonesia qualified for the upcoming 2023 AFC Asian Cup after a 16-year absence. Indonesia would be drawn with the top AFC rank team, Japan, Iraq, and Southeast Asia rival, Vietnam.

==== 2026 FIFA World Cup qualification ====
Indonesia began their 2026 FIFA World Cup qualification campaign in the first round, where they defeated Brunei 12–0 on aggregate to advance.

In the second round, Indonesia was drawn into a group with Iraq, Vietnam, and the Philippines, the same two teams they would later face in the 2023 AFC Asian Cup group stage. They opened the round with a 5–1 defeat to Iraq in Basra, followed by a 1–1 draw against the Philippines in Manila.

==== 2023 AFC Asian Cup ====

Indonesia starting lineup in their opening 2023 AFC Asian Cup match against Iraq.

Indonesia then started off 2024 playing two friendly matches against Libya at the Mardan Sports Complex in Turkey before flying off to Qatar for the last friendly match against Iran as the final preparation for the 2023 AFC Asian Cup tournament, which Indonesia lost all the three matches.

In the first match, Indonesia faced off against Iraq just after two months of facing each other, in a 1–3 loss. In the second match, Indonesia faced off against Southeast Asia rival Vietnam where captain, Asnawi Mangkualam converted a goal from the penalty spot to score the only goal in the match, it was the first time Indonesia defeated Vietnam after 7 years, as Indonesia gained 3 points. In the last group match, Indonesia lost 3–1 to the AFC top rank team, Japan.

Despite with two losses in the group stage, Indonesia qualified into Round of 16 by finishing as one of the four best third-place groups which was confirmed after another match in Group F between Kyrgyzstan and Oman ended in a draw. For the first time ever, Indonesia passed through to the knockout stage of the AFC Asian Cup since their first appearance in 1996 AFC Asian Cup. Indonesia faced against Australia in the Round of 16, and the team's run ended with a 4–0 loss.

==== Advanced to the third round of the 2026 FIFA World Cup qualification ====
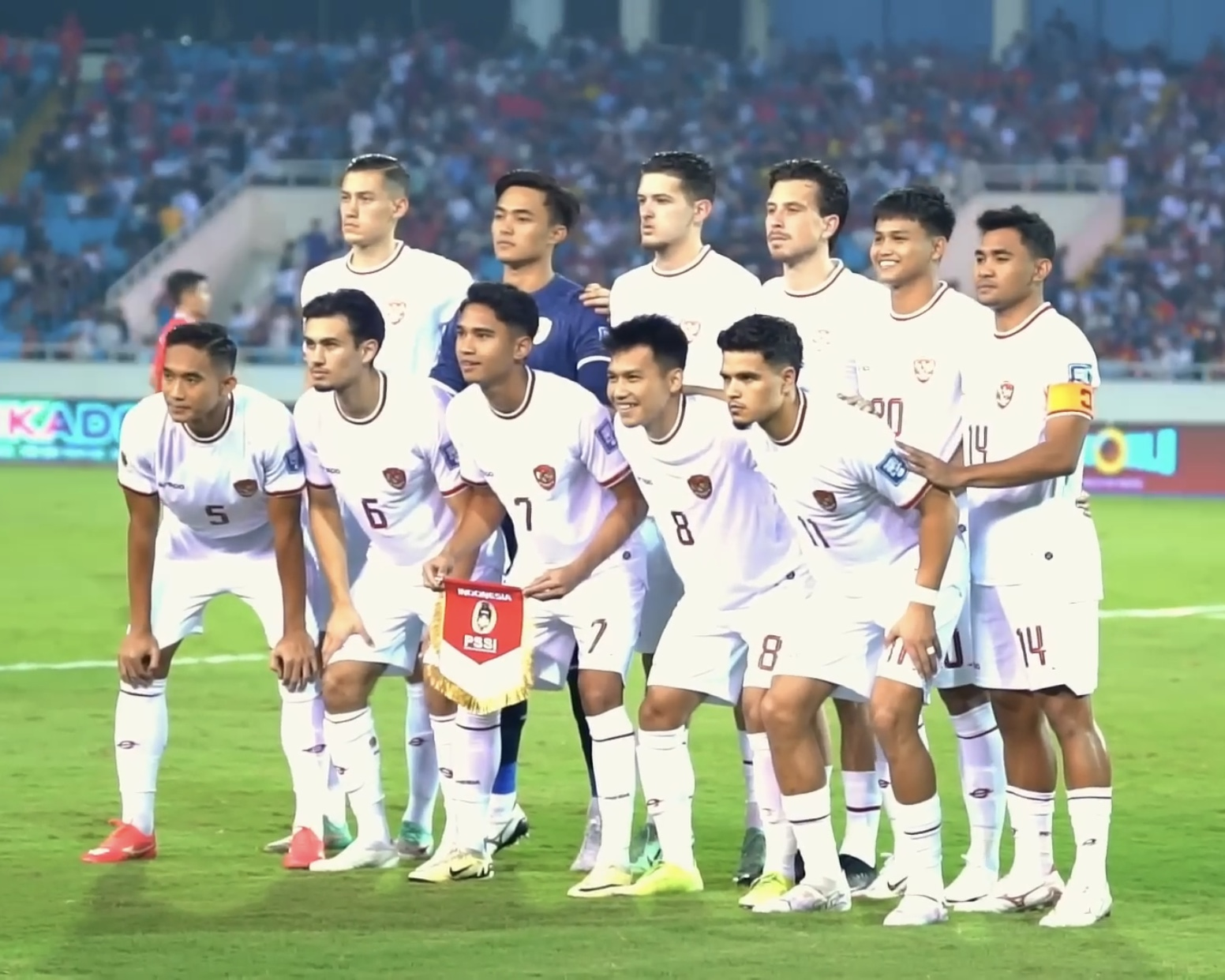
Indonesia line-up against Vietnam in the second round of 2026 FIFA World Cup qualification, 26 March 2024. Indonesia won 3–0.

At the continuation of the 2026 FIFA World Cup qualification, Indonesia managed to beat Vietnam again twice on 21 & 26 March, 1–0 in Jakarta and 3–0 in Hanoi; the latter would be the first time since 2004 that Indonesia defeated Vietnam in their own home ground. Thus Indonesia climbed up to the second place of the group with 7 points. The two victories also made Indonesia surpass ASEAN rivals, Philippines and Malaysia in the FIFA ranking, the latter would be the first time Indonesia placed above Malaysia in the FIFA ranking in 5 years.

On 25 April 2024, PSSI president Erick Thohir announced that Shin's contract is officially extended until 2027.

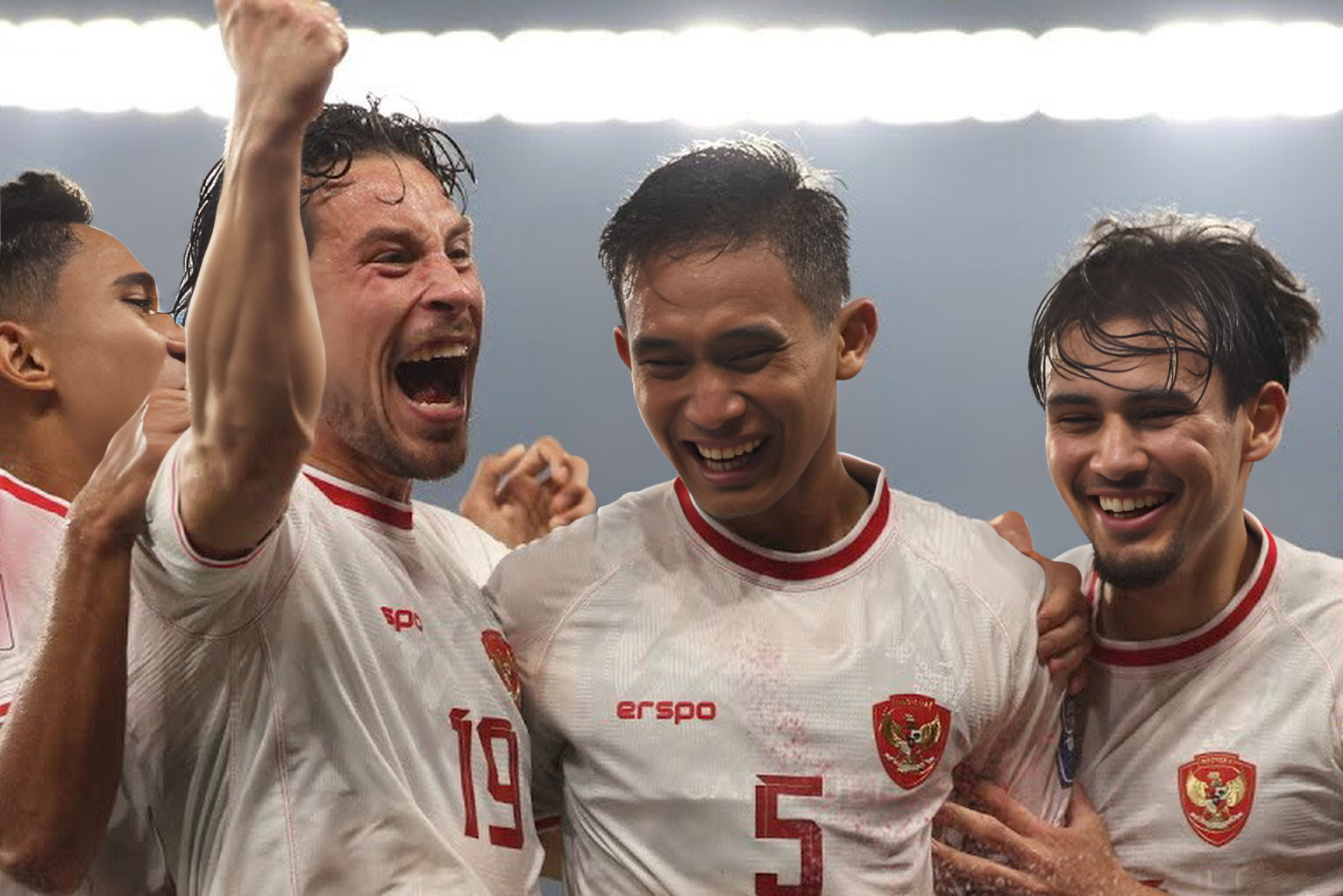
Indonesia's players celebrate a goal against the Philippines, 11 June 2024. Indonesia won 2–0.

In June 2024, Indonesia concluded the second round of the FIFA World Cup qualifiers with two home matches. They suffered a 0–2 defeat to Iraq but secured a 2–0 victory over the Philippines in their final group match. With this result, Indonesia finished as Group F runner-up, earning qualification for the 2027 AFC Asian Cup and advancing to the third round of World Cup qualification for the first time in history. In the third round, Indonesia were drawn into Group C which consisted of powerhouse like Japan, Australia, Saudi Arabia, China, and Bahrain. Indonesia started off their 2026 FIFA World Cup qualifiers in September 2024 where they draw 1–1 against Saudi Arabia in Jeddah and a goalless draw with Australia at home. In October 2024, Indonesia draw 2–2 with Bahrain in Riffa but however suffered a 2–1 defeat to China in Qingdao. In November 2024, Indonesia suffered a heavy 4–0 defeat to Japan at home. However, in the next match, Indonesia surprised the entire world with a shock as they defeated Saudi Arabia 2–0 with Marselino Ferdinan scoring a brace, thus breaking the record of Southeast Asian countries that have never beaten Saudi Arabia.

==== 2024 ASEAN Championship ====
In the 2024 ASEAN Championship, Indonesia fielded a squad primarily composed of players from the U-16 and U-20 teams, along with a few senior players who had participated in the 2023 AFC Asian Cup and the ongoing 2026 FIFA World Cup Qualification. The squad had an average age of 20.4 years. Indonesia was placed in Group B, of which contained Vietnam, Philippines, Myanmar, and Laos. Indonesia secured one victory but did not advance past the group stage.

==== Shin's dismissal ====
On 6 January 2025, PSSI announced the termination of Shin Tae-yong's contract as head coach. The Indonesian FA president Erick Thohir said the dismissal was due to communication and tactical issues, with the defeat against China and failure in the ASEAN Championship being the determining factors.

The dismissal triggered significant backlash from supporters, who believed that Shin had played a major role in elevating the reputation of Indonesian football.

=== 2025: Patrick Kluivert's tenure ===
Following Shin Tae-yong's dismissal, on 8 January 2025, the PSSI officially appointed Patrick Kluivert as head coach, with Alex Pastoor and Denny Landzaat assisting him with a contract until 2027. In the continuation of third round World Cup qualifiers, Indonesia's first match under Kluivert ended in a 1–5 away loss to Australia, but they bounced back by defeating Bahrain 1–0 at home. On 5 June 2025, Indonesia managed to defeat China 1–0, their first win against the latter in 38 years. The win advanced Indonesia to the fourth round of World Cup qualification.

However, in the fourth round, Indonesia was beaten by Saudi Arabia 2–3 and Iraq 0–1, thus eliminating Indonesia from the World Cup contention. Following the elimination, widespread fan disappointment sparked calls for Kluivert’s immediate dismissal. The anger intensified after Kluivert and his assistants returned to the Netherlands without issuing an apology or accepting responsibility for the defeat. On 16 October 2025, PSSI decided to parted ways with Kluivert and the rest of the coaching staffs through a mutual agreement.

=== 2026: John Herdman's tenure ===
On 3 January 2026, PSSI officially appointed former Canada national team head coach John Herdman as the new head coach of the national team. At the time of Herdman’s appointment, Indonesia were ranked 122nd in the FIFA World Ranking.

Herdman made his debut in the 2026 FIFA Series, with a 4–0 win against Saint Kitts and Nevis. Indonesia finished runners up of the FIFA Series after a 0–1 defeat against Bulgaria in the following match.

During the June international window, Indonesia won 3–0 over Oman and 1–0 over Mozambique. The results helped Indonesia rise four places in the FIFA World Ranking, from 122nd to 118th. By the July 2026 ranking, Indonesia were the third-highest ranked Southeast Asian national team, behind Thailand, ranked 94th, and Vietnam, ranked 99th.

Indonesian starting line-up against Thailand at the final match of 2026 FIFA ASEAN Cup.

In the 2026 ASEAN Championship, Indonesia was placed in Group A, which contained Vietnam, Singapore, Cambodia, and Timor-Leste. Indonesia secured two victories but still did not advance past the group stage. This failure marked the second time in the Erick Thohir era.

In September and October, Indonesia competed in the inaugural FIFA ASEAN Cup of the 2026 edition. Indonesia were drawn alongside Malaysia, Singapore, and Bangladesh in Group A. They opened the tournament with a 2–0 victory over Singapore before drawing 0–0 with Malaysia despite playing with ten men from the 37th minute. On the final matchday of the group stage, Indonesia defeated Bangladesh 9–2, with Mitchell Baker scoring five goals. Indonesia and Malaysia both finished with seven points and a +9 goal difference, but Indonesia advanced to the final on goals scored after Kevin Diks and Baker scored in stoppage time.

In the final on 5 October, Indonesia faced Thailand. The match finished 2–2 after extra time before Indonesia won the penalty shoot-out 4–2, with goalkeeper Emil Audero saving Thailand’s fourth penalty. The victory made Indonesia the inaugural FIFA ASEAN Cup champions, and also marked their first title in the Southeast Asian level, or since the 1991 SEA Games if including medals.

During the opening match against Singapore, Indonesia made national history by fielding a starting lineup composed entirely of foreign-born players for the first time.

Also during the final against Thailand, Indonesia made Southeast Asian history by breaking the curse of the finals where they lost since the establishment of the ASEAN Championship, or the 1997 SEA Games if including medals.

The success in the inaugural FIFA ASEAN Cup helped Indonesia rise from the 118th to 116th place in the FIFA World Ranking by October 2026.

== Team image ==
=== Kits and crest ===
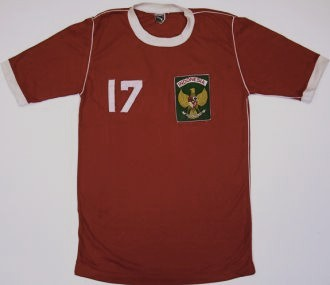
Indonesia's football jersey with number 17 in 1981

During the Dutch colonial era, the team competed as Dutch East Indies in international matches and played in an orange jersey, the national color of the Netherlands. There are no official documents about the team's kit, only several black-and-white photos from the match against Hungary in the 1938 FIFA World Cup but unofficial documents stated that the kit consisted of an orange jersey, white shorts and light blue socks. Since Indonesia's independence, the kit consists of red and white, the colors of the country's flag. A combination of green and white has also been used for the away kits and was used for the team's participation in the 1956 Summer Olympics in Melbourne, Australia, until the mid-1980s.

Kelme is the national team's kit provider, a sponsorship that began in 2026 and is contracted to continue until at least 2030. Previously the team's kit was supplied by Nike, Mills and Erspo. Indonesia also wears other apparel, only when they compete in international sports events such as the Asian Games and the Southeast Asian Games. In those events Indonesia wears Li-Ning, this is due to the Asian Games and SEA Games being multi-sports events all of whose contingents are under the Indonesian National Olympic Committee (NOC).

From 2007 to 2019, Nike was the national team kit provider. The 2010–2012 home kit became an issue when the team played against an opponent wearing an all-white uniform since the socks were white instead of the usual red. The solution was solved with a red-green-green combination (for away games) with green shorts and socks taken from the away kit, or initially an all-red uniform (for home games). After a home defeat in the 2014 World Cup third round qualifier match against Bahrain on 6 September 2011, the red shorts (with green application) were scrapped after its first outing and has never been used again. The red socks had white application on them, different from the red socks with green application worn during training. The combination of red-white-red was used sometimes in the future as the alternate home kit, for example on the subsequent home matches of the qualifiers against Qatar and Iran later that year.

On 31 May 2018, Nike released Indonesia's new home and away kits. The home shirt was red with a golden Nike logo inspired by the country's national emblem, the Garuda Pancasila. The home kit consisted of a red-white-red combination. The away kit consisted of a white-green-white combination with a green Nike logo on the shirt.

In 2020, Indonesia started using new apparel from local brands Mills until 2024. The home kit consists of a red-white-red combination with a silhouette in the front of the kit. The away kit consists white-green-white combination with a green horizontal strip across the front of the kit and a smaller white horizontal strip across the green strip. The third kit consists all black combination with golden strips and a silhouette in the front of the kit.

==== Kit suppliers ====
Kit supplier	Period	Ref.
(Germany) Adidas	1970–1995	
(Japan) Asics	1996	
(Italy) Diadora	1996–1997	
(Germany) Uhlsport	1997	
(Japan) Mikasa	1997	
(Germany) Adidas	1998–2000	
(United States) Nike	2000–2003	
(Germany) Adidas	2004–2006	
(United States) Nike	2007–2020	
(Indonesia) Mills	2020–2024	
(Indonesia) Erspo	2024–2026	
(Spain) Kelme	2026–present	

=== Rivalries ===
Indonesia's main rival is Malaysia. It is one of Southeast Asia and Asia's best known football rivalries. The countries have played against each other 99 times, of which Indonesia have won 40, drawn 21 and lost 38. The heated political conflict between the two countries in the 1960s transmitted disease to the football field. The infamous "Ganyang Malaysia!" statement put forward by Indonesia's first president Sukarno in a 1963 political speech in Jakarta was considered an encouragement for the Indonesian team before matches against Malaysia.

The first competitive match between the countries was a 4–2 win for Indonesia in the second round of the 1957 Merdeka Tournament in Kuala Lumpur. Since then, the matches between the two, whether in Jakarta or Kuala Lumpur, have always been packed with spectators and have often resulted controversial incidents. In 2011, two fans died in a stampede during a Southeast Asian Games final between the under-23 teams of Indonesia and Malaysia in Jakarta. The two teams most recently met in the 2020 AFF Championship, with Indonesia winning 4–1.

Another of Indonesia's rivalries is based on its geographical proximity to neighboring countries in Southeast Asia such as Thailand, Vietnam, and Singapore.

=== Media coverage ===
The national team is always broadcast on MNC Media. But from 2020, MNC only covered the national team matches at ASEAN Championship and AFC Asian Cup due to MNC–Lagardère (ASEAN Championship) and AFC broadcasting rights partnership contract. However, other networks like Emtek bought the rights from PSSI only. Also in 2026, Emtek bought the rights to FIFA ASEAN Cup.

Indonesia team qualifiers for the 2026 FIFA World Cup and 2027 AFC Asian Cup are broadcast by MNC Media's free-to-air television network RCTI (1st round, 2nd round until matchday 5, 3rd round, & 4th round) and Emtek's free-to-air television networks Indosiar and SCTV (matchday 6 of 2nd round only).

== Home stadium ==
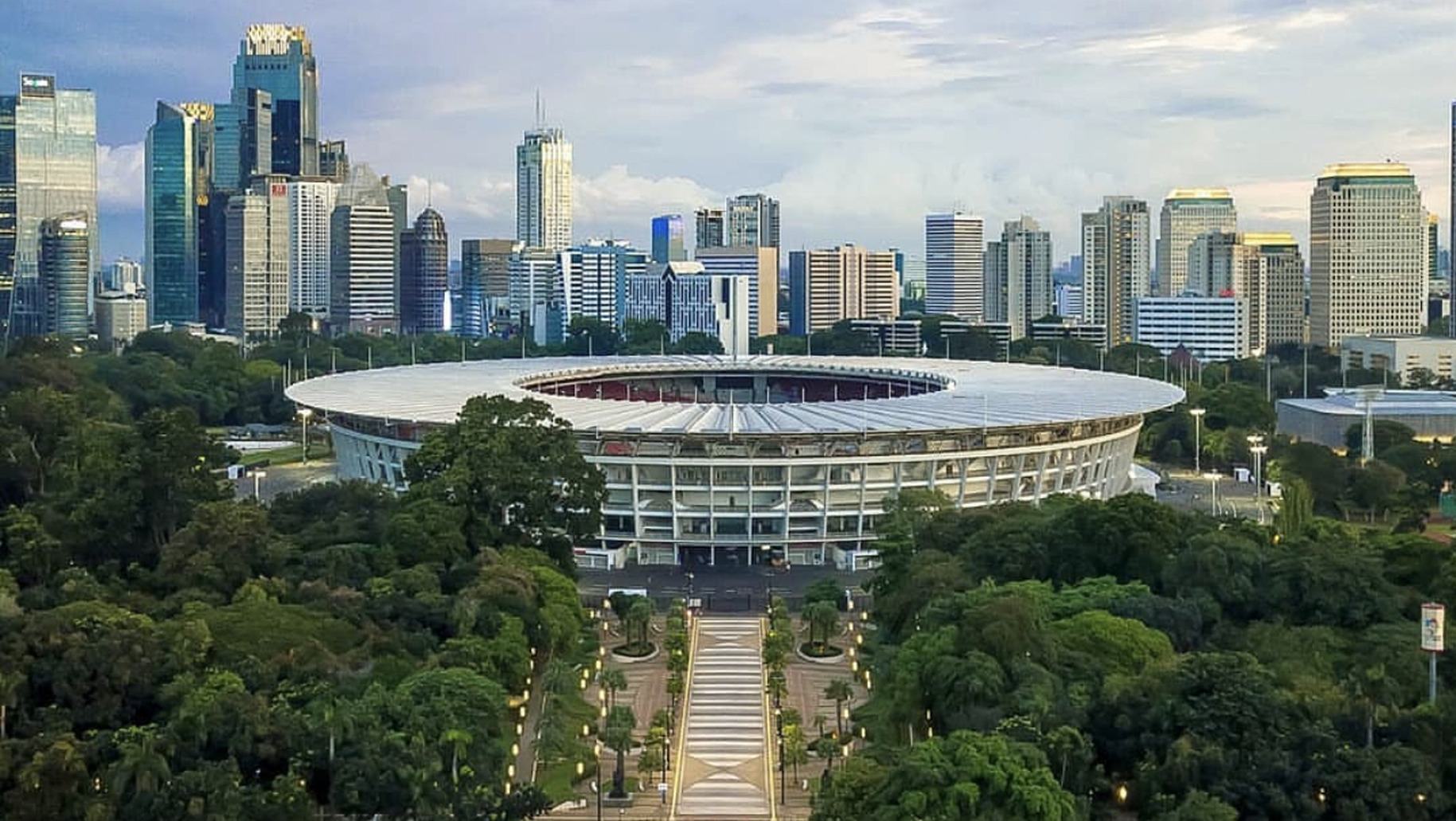
Gelora Bung Karno Stadium has been the home of the Indonesia national team since 1962

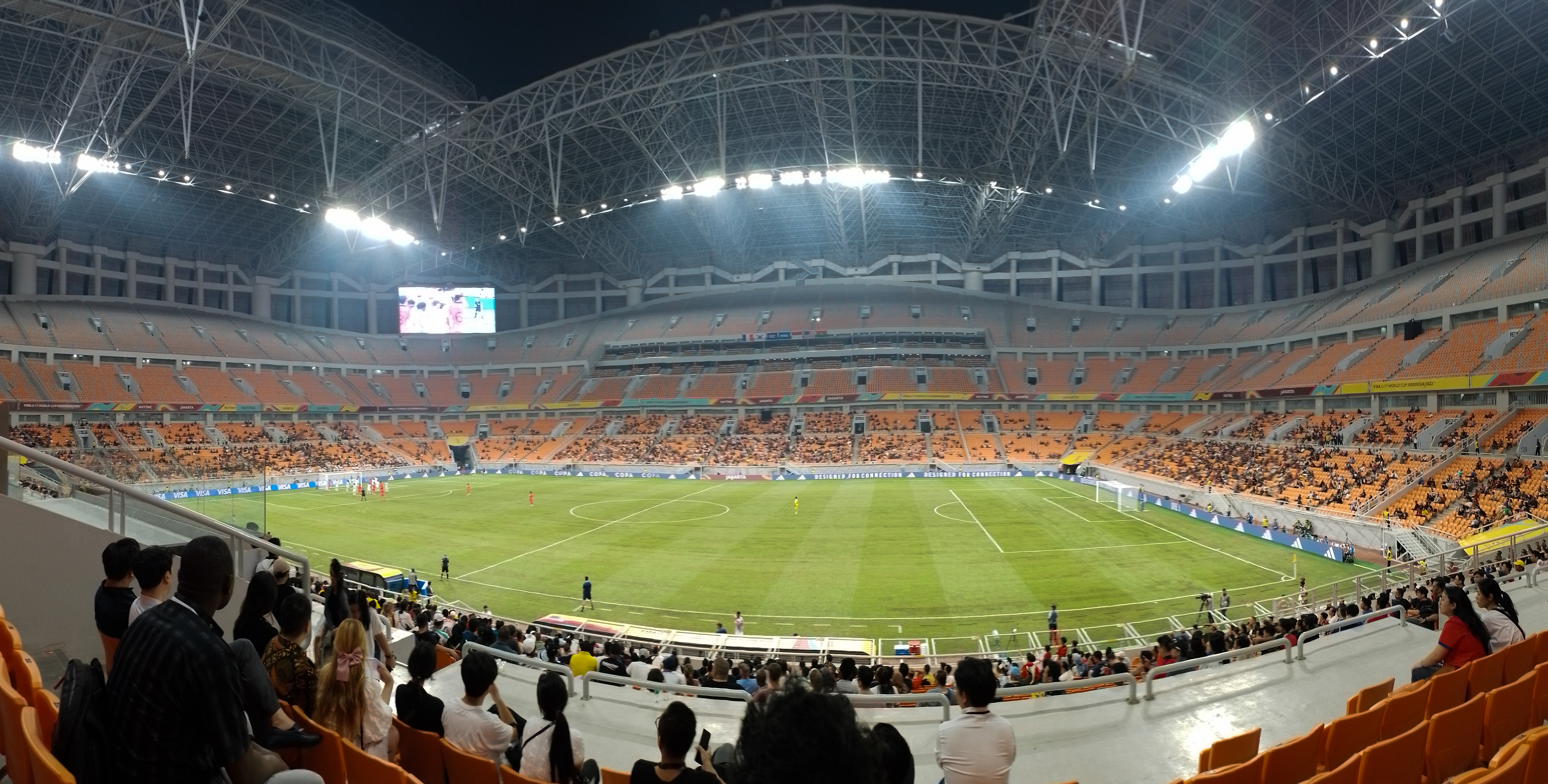
The Jakarta International Stadium during the FIFA U-17 World Cup group stage match between South Korea and the United States

During Indonesia's early days as the Dutch East Indies, no stadium could be recognized as a home ground since the national team never played home games in the country. The national team at that time played four games at neutral venues and one away game. It was only after independence in 1945, the national team used the Ikada Stadium in Jakarta as their home ground. The stadium had a capacity of 30,000 spectators and was also used for the National Sports Week in 1951. It was the largest stadium in Jakarta until 1962. The team used the stadium until 1963 after it was demolished to make way for construction of the National Monument. The site is now known as Merdeka Square.

In 1962, Gelora Bung Karno Stadium was inaugurated as Indonesia's new national stadium ahead of the 1962 Asian Games. Located within the Gelora Bung Karno Sports Complex, Gelora, Tanah Abang, Central Jakarta, the stadium has a seating capacity of over 77,193 spectators and is currently the 40th largest association football stadium in the world. Indonesia's first match at the stadium was played on 27 August 1962 against Philippines, where Indonesia won the match 6–0. Indonesia has used the stadium for many major home games, including the 2007 AFC Asian Cup matches.

In 2023, Jakarta International Stadium was agreed to be the occasional home for the Indonesian national team, based on the agreement between the Football Association of Indonesia (PSSI) and PT JAKPRO as the developer. Located in Tanjung Priok, North Jakarta, the stadium was inaugurated in 2022 and has a capacity of 82,000 spectators, making it the largest stadium in Indonesia and largest football-specific stadium in Asia. In addition, Indonesia also uses several stadiums to hold their home matches, such as Gelora Bung Tomo Stadium, Patriot Stadium and Pakansari Stadium.

== Results and fixtures ==
The following is a list of match results in the last 12 months, as well as any future matches that have been scheduled.

Win Draw Loss Fixture

=== 2026 ===
27 March 2026 FIFA Series	Indonesia	4–0	Saint Kitts and Nevis	Jakarta, Indonesia
20:00 UTC+7	Beckham 15', 25'; Romeny 53'; Zijlstra 75'	Report		Stadium: Gelora Bung Karno Stadium; Attendance: 26,703; Referee: Muhammad Taqi (Singapore)

30 March 2026 FIFA Series	Indonesia	0–1	Bulgaria	Jakarta, Indonesia
20:00 UTC+7		Report	M. Petkov 38' (pen.)	Stadium: Gelora Bung Karno Stadium; Attendance: 24,174; Referee: Nazmi Nasaruddin (Malaysia)

5 June Garuda Championship Series	Indonesia	3–0	Oman	Jakarta, Indonesia
20:00 UTC+7	Hubner 13'; Romeny 27'; Oratmangoen 55'	Report		Stadium: Gelora Bung Karno Stadium; Attendance: 23,677; Referee: Muhammad Taqi (Singapore)

9 June Garuda Championship Series	Indonesia	1–0	Mozambique	Jakarta, Indonesia
20:00 UTC+7	Romeny 12'	Report		Stadium: Gelora Bung Karno Stadium; Attendance: 29,889; Referee: Muhammad Taqi (Singapore)

27 July 2026 ASEAN Championship Group A	Indonesia	5–1	Cambodia	Bogor, Indonesia
20:30 UTC+7	Baker 6', 15', 56'; Walsh 24'; Raven 86'	Report	Nadeo 48' (o.g.)	Stadium: Pakansari Stadium; Attendance: 22,485; Referee: Kim Woo-Sung (South Korea)

31 July 2026 ASEAN Championship Group A	Timor-Leste	0–3	Indonesia	Chonburi, Thailand
17:00 UTC+7		Report	Pattynama 74'; Haye 78'; Baker 81'	Stadium: Chonburi Stadium; Attendance: 189; Referee: Choi Hyun-jai (South Korea)

3 August 2026 ASEAN Championship Group A	Indonesia	0–3	Vietnam	Bogor, Indonesia
20:30 UTC+7		Report	Nguyễn Văn Vĩ 6'; Nguyễn Hai Long 14'; Rafaelson 71'	Stadium: Pakansari Stadium; Attendance: 27,265; Referee: Tim Danaskos (Australia)

7 August 2026 ASEAN Championship Group A	Singapore	1–1	Indonesia	Kallang, Singapore
21:00 UTC+8	Ilhan 66'	Report	Oratmangoen 47'	Stadium: Jalan Besar Stadium; Attendance: 5,113; Referee: Abdullah Salim Khalfan Al-Amouri (Oman)

25 September 2026 ASEAN Cup Group A	Indonesia	2–0	Singapore	Jakarta, Indonesia
20:00 UTC+7	Oratmangoen 13'; Romeny 74' (pen.)	FIFA Report; GSA Report		Stadium: Gelora Bung Karno Stadium; Attendance: 38,702; Referee: Rustam Lutfullin (Uzbekistan)

28 September 2026 ASEAN Cup Group A	Malaysia	0–0	Indonesia	Jakarta, Indonesia
19:30 UTC+7		FIFA Report; GSA Report		Stadium: Gelora Bung Karno Stadium; Attendance: 56,894; Referee: Ko Hyung-jin (South Korea)

1 October 2026 ASEAN Cup Group A	Indonesia	9–2	Bangladesh	Jakarta, Indonesia
19:30 UTC+7	Baker 11', 20', 37', 42', 90+7'; Ridho 32'; Hubner 45+1'; Vickery 90'; Diks 90+6'	FIFA Report; GSA Report	Emon 36'; Wahid 90+1'	Stadium: Gelora Bung Karno Stadium; Attendance: 33,595; Referee: Nasrullo Kabirov (Tajikistan)

5 October 2026 FIFA ASEAN Cup final	Indonesia	2–2 (a.e.t.) (4–2 p)	Thailand	Jakarta, Indonesia
20:00 UTC+7	James 84'; Baggott 116'	FIFA Report; GSA Report	Iklas 87'; Peeradol 111'	Stadium: Gelora Bung Karno Stadium; Attendance: 70,098; Referee: Akhrol Riskullaev (Uzbekistan)
	Penalties
	Diks (penalty scored); James (penalty scored); Baggott (penalty scored); Pattynama (penalty scored)		(penalty scored) Bihr; (penalty scored) Waris; (penalty missed) Sarach; (penalty missed) Nattapong

=== 2027 ===
December 2027 AFC Asian Cup	Japan	v	Indonesia	Jeddah, Saudi Arabia
--:-- UTC+3				Stadium: Prince Abdullah Al-Faisal Sports City Stadium

December 2027 AFC Asian Cup	Indonesia	v	Qatar	Al Khobar, Saudi Arabia
--:-- UTC+3				Stadium: Aramco Stadium

=== 2028 ===
January 2027 AFC Asian Cup	Thailand	v	Indonesia	Jeddah, Saudi Arabia
--:-- UTC+3				Stadium: King Abdullah Sports City Stadium

== Coaching staff ==
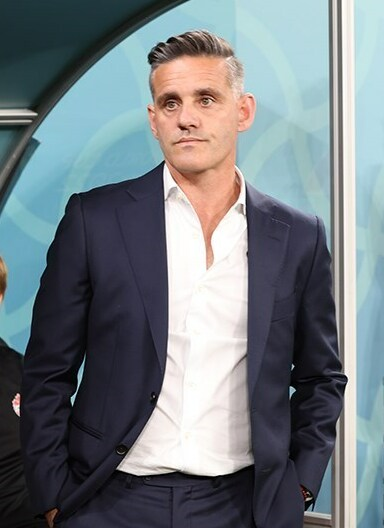
John Herdman, the current head coach of the Indonesia national football team

As of 24 May 2026

Position	Name
Technical director	Alexander Zwiers
Head of scouting	(Netherlands) Simon Tahamata
Head of education	(England) Alistair Smith
Head coach	(England) John Herdman
Assistant coaches	(England) Simon Grayson
Assistant coaches	(England) Elliott Dickman
Assistant coaches	(Canada) Steven Vitória
Assistant coaches	(Indonesia) Nova Arianto
Goalkeeping coaches	(Slovakia) Andrej Kostolansky
Goalkeeping coaches	(South Africa) Damian van Rensburg
Head of performance	(Canada) César Meylan
Video analyst	(Indonesia) Dzikry Lazuardi
Sports scientist	(Indonesia) Valdano Wiriawanputra
Doctor	(Indonesia) Alfan Nur Asyhar
Physiotherapists	(Australia) Lachlan Fooks
Physiotherapists	(Republic of Ireland) James Gardiner
Physiotherapists	(Indonesia) Titus Argatama
Physiotherapists	(Indonesia) Firdausi Kahfi
Sports nutritionist	(Indonesia) Emilia Achmadi
Administrator	(Canada) Maeve Glass
Operations manager	(Indonesia) Ashfi Qamara
Kitman	(England) Ronnie Barrie
Technical advisor	(Netherlands) Jordi Cruyff
Ref.:

=== Coaching history ===
Last update: 5 October 2026
Caretaker coaches are listed in italics.

From	To	Manager	M	W	D	L	Competitions
1934	1938	(Netherlands) Jan Mastenbroek	5	1	0	4	1934 Far Eastern Games 1938 FIFA World Cup
1951	1953	(Singapore) Choo Seng Quee	3	1	0	2	1951 Asian Games
1954	1963	(Socialist Federal Republic of Yugoslavia) Antun Pogačnik	73	38	8	27	1954 Asian Games 1956 Olympics World Cup 1958 qualification 1958 Asian Games Olympics 1960 qualification 1962 Asian Games 1963 GANEFO
1966	1967	(Indonesia) Djamiat Dalhar	21	7	4	10	1966 Asian Games GANEFO 1966 qualification Asian Cup 1968 qualification
1968	1970	(Indonesia) Opa Mangindaan	21	15	1	5	Olympics 1968 qualification
1970	1970	(Indonesia) Endang Witarsa	6	3	0	3	
1970	1972	(Indonesia) Djamiat Dalhar	59 (38)	29 (22)	8 (4)	22 (12)	1970 Asian Games Asian Cup 1972 qualification Olympics 1972 qualification
1972	1974	(Indonesia) Suwardi Arland	19	4	5	10	World Cup 1974 qualification
1974	1975	(Indonesia) Endang Witarsa	26 (20)	8 (5)	5 (5)	13 (10)	Asian Cup 1976 qualification
1975	1976	(Netherlands) Wiel Coerver	16	8	2	6	Olympics 1976 qualification
1976	1978	(Indonesia) Suwardi Arland	38 (19)	8 (4)	14 (9)	16 (6)	World Cup 1978 qualification 1977 Southeast Asian Games
1978	1979	(Netherlands) Frans van Balkom	14	4	2	8	Asian Cup 1980 qualification
1979	1980	(Poland) Marek Janota	19	4	5	11	1979 Southeast Asian Games Olympics 1980 qualification
1980	1981	(Indonesia) Harry Tjong	22	4	6	12	World Cup 1982 qualification
1981	1982	(West Germany) Bernd Fischer	14	5	3	6	1981 Southeast Asian Games
1982	1983	(Indonesia) Iswadi Idris	15	4	3	8	1983 Southeast Asian Games
1983	1983	(Indonesia) M. Basri	9	0	3	6	Olympics 1984 qualification
1983	1985	(Indonesia) Sinyo Aliandoe, (Brazil) Barbatana	21	8	3	7	Asian Cup 1984 qualification World Cup 1986 qualification
1985	1989	(Indonesia) Bertje Matulapelwa	26	6	7	13	1985 Southeast Asian Games 1986 Asian Games Asian Cup 1988 qualification 1987 Southeast Asian Games Olympics 1988 qualification
1989	1989	(Indonesia) M. Basri, Iswadi Idris, Abdul Kadir	6	1	3	2	World Cup 1990 qualification 1989 Southeast Asian Games
1989	1991	(Soviet Union) Anatoli Polosin	14	5	4	5	1991 Southeast Asian Games Olympics 1992 qualification
1991	1993	(Federal Republic of Yugoslavia) Ivan Toplak	16	4	2	10	Asian Cup 1992 qualification World Cup 1994 qualification 1993 Southeast Asian Games
1993	1996	(Italy) Romano Mattè	5	2	1	2	1995 Southeast Asian Games
1996	1996	(Indonesia) Andi M. Teguh	3	1	1	1	Asian Cup 1996 qualification
1996	1996	(Indonesia) Danurwindo	14	3	2	9	1996 AFF Championship 1996 AFC Asian Cup
1996	1997	(Netherlands) Henk Wullems	19	8	7	4	World Cup 1998 qualification 1997 Southeast Asian Games
1998	1998	(Indonesia) Rusdy Bahalwan	5	2	1	2	1998 AFF Championship
1999	1999	(Germany) Bernd Schumm	8	3	4	1	1999 Southeast Asian Games
1999	2000	(Indonesia) Nandar Iskandar	14	7	3	4	Asian Cup 2000 qualification 2000 AFC Asian Cup 2000 AFF Championship
2000	2000	(Indonesia) Dananjaya	3	2	0	1	2000 AFF Championship
2000	2001	(Indonesia) Benny Dollo	6	4	0	2	World Cup 2002 qualification
2002	2004	(Bulgaria) Ivan Kolev	23	8	8	7	2002 AFF Championship Asian Cup 2004 qualification World Cup 2006 qualification 2004 AFC Asian Cup
2004	2007	(England) Peter Withe	19	6	6	7	World Cup 2006 qualification 2004 AFF Championship 2007 AFF Championship
2007	2007	(Bulgaria) Ivan Kolev	32 (9)	11 (3)	8 (0)	13 (6)	2007 AFC Asian Cup World Cup 2010 qualification
Jan 2008	Mar 2010	(Indonesia) Benny Dollo	26 (20)	11 (7)	4 (4)	11 (9)	2008 AFF Championship Asian Cup 2011 qualification
Apr 2010	Jul 2011	(Austria) Alfred Riedl	11	9	0	2	2010 AFF Championship
Jul 2011	Jan 2012	(Netherlands) Wim Rijsbergen	10	2	2	6	World Cup 2014 qualification
Feb 2012	Feb 2012	(Indonesia) Aji Santoso	1	0	0	1	World Cup 2014 qualification
Feb 2012	Feb 2013	(Indonesia) Nil Maizar	10	2	4	4	2012 AFF Championship Asian Cup 2015 qualification
Mar 2013	Mar 2013	(Indonesia) Rahmad Darmawan	1	0	0	1	Asian Cup 2015 qualification
Mar 2013	Nov 2013	(Brazil) Jacksen Tiago	6	2	1	3	Asian Cup 2015 qualification
Feb 2014	Nov 2014	(Austria) Alfred Riedl	21 (10)	12 (3)	3 (3)	6 (4)	Asian Cup 2015 qualification 2014 AFF Championship
Feb 2015	Mar 2015	(Indonesia) Benny Dollo	28 (2)	12 (1)	4 (0)	12 (1)	
Jun 2016	Dec 2016	(Austria) Alfred Riedl	32 (11)	16 (4)	7 (4)	9 (3)	2016 AFF Championship
Jan 2017	Sep 2018	(Spain) Luis Milla	13	7	2	4	
Sep 2018	Dec 2018	(Indonesia) Bima Sakti	7	3	2	2	2018 AFF Championship
Jan 2019	Nov 2019	(Scotland) Simon McMenemy	7	2	0	5	World Cup 2022 qualification
Nov 2019	Nov 2019	(Indonesia) Yeyen Tumena	1	0	0	1	World Cup 2022 qualification
Jan 2020	Jan 2025	(South Korea) Shin Tae-yong	59	26	14	19	World Cup 2022 qualification 2020 AFF Championship Asian Cup 2023 qualification 2022 AFF Championship 2023 AFC Asian Cup World Cup 2026 qualification 2024 ASEAN Championship
Jan 2025	Oct 2025	(Netherlands) Patrick Kluivert	8	3	1	4	World Cup 2026 qualification
Jan 2026	Present	(England) John Herdman	12	7	3	2	2026 FIFA Series 2026 ASEAN Championship 2026 FIFA ASEAN Cup

== Players ==
=== Current squad ===
The following 23 players were called up for the 2026 FIFA ASEAN Cup. On 20 September 2026, Shayne Pattynama was called up to the squad replacing Dony Tri Pamungkas. On 22 September 2026, Rizky Eka Pratama was called up to the squad replacing Yakob Sayuri.

Caps and goals as of 5 October 2026, after the match against Thailand.

No.	Pos.	Player	Date of birth (age)	Caps	Goals	Club
1	GK	Emil Audero	18 January 1997 (age 29)	8	0	(Royal Spanish Football Federation) Rayo Vallecano
12	GK	Maarten Paes	14 May 1998 (age 28)	14	0	(Royal Dutch Football Association) Ajax
13	GK	Nadeo Argawinata	9 March 1997 (age 29)	26	0	(Football Association of Indonesia) Persija Jakarta
2	DF	Kevin Diks (captain)	6 October 1996 (age 30)	16	3	(German Football Association) Borussia Mönchengladbach
3	DF	Dion Markx	29 June 2005 (age 21)	0	0	(Football Association of Indonesia) Persita Tangerang
4	DF	Jordi Amat	21 March 1992 (age 34)	25	2	(Football Association of Indonesia) Persija Jakarta
5	DF	Rizky Ridho	21 November 2001 (age 24)	61	5	(Football Association of Indonesia) Persija Jakarta
16	DF	Shayne Pattynama	11 August 1998 (age 28)	18	2	(Football Association of Indonesia) Persija Jakarta
17	DF	Calvin Verdonk	26 April 1997 (age 29)	20	0	(French Football Federation) Lille
20	DF	Elkan Baggott	23 October 2002 (age 24)	32	3	(The Football Association) Millwall
21	DF	Dean James	30 April 2000 (age 26)	9	1	(Royal Dutch Football Association) Go Ahead Eagles
23	DF	Justin Hubner	14 September 2003 (age 23)	25	2	(Royal Dutch Football Association) Fortuna Sittard
6	MF	Rizky Eka Pratama	24 December 1999 (age 26)	2	0	(Football Association of Indonesia) PSM Makassar
14	MF	Joey Pelupessy	15 May 1993 (age 33)	14	0	(Royal Belgian Football Association) Lommel
15	MF	Rayhan Hannan	2 April 2004 (age 22)	8	0	(Football Association of Indonesia) Persija Jakarta
18	MF	Ivar Jenner	10 January 2004 (age 22)	33	0	(Football Association of Indonesia) Dewa United Banten
19	MF	Thom Haye	9 February 1995 (age 31)	25	3	(Football Association of Indonesia) Persib Bandung
22	MF	Nathan Tjoe-A-On	22 December 2001 (age 24)	19	0	(Royal Dutch Football Association) Willem II
7	FW	Egy Maulana Vikri	7 July 2000 (age 26)	37	9	(Football Association of Indonesia) Dewa United Banten
8	FW	Luke Vickery	25 October 2005 (age 21)	4	1	(Football Australia) Macarthur
9	FW	Mitchell Baker	11 December 2006 (age 19)	8	9	(United States Soccer Federation) Vermont Green
10	FW	Ole Romeny	20 June 2000 (age 26)	14	7	(Royal Dutch Football Association) Fortuna Sittard
11	FW	Ragnar Oratmangoen	21 January 1998 (age 28)	24	5	(Football Association of Indonesia) Persib Bandung

=== Recent call-ups ===
The following players have also been called up to the squad within the last 12 months.

Pos.	Player	Date of birth (age)	Caps	Goals	Club	Latest call-up
GK	Muhammad Riyandi	3 January 2000 (age 26)	5	0	(Indonesia) Dewa United Banten	2026 ASEAN Championship
GK	Cahya Supriadi	11 February 2003 (age 23)	5	0	(Indonesia) PSIM Yogyakarta	2026 ASEAN Championship
GK	Teja Paku Alam	14 September 1994 (age 32)	0	0	(Indonesia) Persib Bandung	2026 ASEAN Championship^{PRE}
GK	Ernando Ari	27 February 2002 (age 24)	15	0	(Indonesia) Persebaya Surabaya	v. Saint Kitts and Nevis, 27 March 2026^{PRE}
DF	Dony Tri Pamungkas	11 January 2005 (age 21)	12	0	(Indonesia) Persija Jakarta	2026 FIFA ASEAN Cup^{INJ}
DF	Sandy Walsh	14 March 1995 (age 31)	26	4	(Indonesia) Persib Bandung	2026 ASEAN Championship
DF	Wahyu Prasetyo	21 March 1998 (age 28)	5	0	(Indonesia) Garudayaksa	2026 ASEAN Championship
DF	Tim Geypens	21 June 2005 (age 21)	3	0	(Indonesia) Bali United	2026 ASEAN Championship
DF	Brian Fatari	20 December 1999 (age 26)	2	0	(Indonesia) Dewa United Banten	2026 ASEAN Championship
DF	Pratama Arhan	21 December 2001 (age 24)	54	4	(Indonesia) Persija Jakarta	2026 ASEAN Championship^{PRE}
DF	Muhammad Ferarri	21 June 2003 (age 23)	8	2	(Indonesia) Bhayangkara Presisi Lampung	2026 ASEAN Championship^{PRE}
DF	Yance Sayuri	22 September 1997 (age 29)	4	0	(Indonesia) Java United	2026 ASEAN Championship^{PRE}
DF	Kakang Rudianto	2 February 2003 (age 23)	1	0	(Indonesia) Persib Bandung	2026 ASEAN Championship^{PRE}
DF	Mathew Baker	13 May 2009 (age 17)	1	0	(Australia) Melbourne City	2026 ASEAN Championship^{PRE}
DF	Komang Teguh	28 April 2002 (age 24)	0	0	(Indonesia) Borneo Samarinda	2026 ASEAN Championship^{PRE}
DF	Fajar Fathur Rahman	29 May 2002 (age 24)	0	0	(Indonesia) Persija Jakarta	2026 ASEAN Championship^{PRE}
DF	Alfharezzi Buffon	28 April 2006 (age 20)	0	0	(Indonesia) Dewa United Banten	v. Oman, 5 June 2026^{PRE}
DF	Jay Idzes (captain)	2 June 2000 (age 26)	18	1	(Italy) Sassuolo	v. Oman, 5 June 2026^{PRE / INJ}
MF	Yakob Sayuri	22 September 1997 (age 29)	35	3	(Indonesia) Java United	2026 FIFA ASEAN Cup^{UNF}
MF	Saddil Ramdani	2 January 1999 (age 27)	31	2	(Indonesia) Persebaya Surabaya	2026 ASEAN Championship
MF	Marc Klok	20 April 1993 (age 33)	27	5	(Indonesia) Persib Bandung	2026 ASEAN Championship
MF	Eliano Reijnders	23 October 2000 (age 26)	13	1	(Indonesia) Persib Bandung	2026 ASEAN Championship
MF	Beckham Putra	29 October 2001 (age 25)	11	2	(Indonesia) Persib Bandung	2026 ASEAN Championship
MF	Kadek Agung	25 June 1998 (age 28)	11	1	(Indonesia) Bali United	2026 ASEAN Championship
MF	Marselino Ferdinan	9 September 2004 (age 22)	41	5	(Indonesia) Persija Jakarta	2026 ASEAN Championship^{INJ}
MF	Witan Sulaeman	8 October 2001 (age 25)	49	9	(Indonesia) Persija Jakarta	2026 ASEAN Championship^{PRE}
MF	Ricky Kambuaya	5 May 1996 (age 30)	46	5	(Indonesia) Dewa United Banten	2026 ASEAN Championship^{PRE}
MF	Adam Alis	19 December 1993 (age 32)	11	1	(Indonesia) Persib Bandung	2026 ASEAN Championship^{PRE}
MF	Arkhan Fikri	28 December 2004 (age 21)	8	0	(Indonesia) Arema	2026 ASEAN Championship^{PRE}
MF	Victor Dethan	11 July 2004 (age 22)	4	0	(Indonesia) Persija Jakarta	2026 ASEAN Championship^{PRE}
MF	Rahmat Arjuna	30 April 2004 (age 22)	0	0	(Indonesia) Bali United	2026 ASEAN Championship^{PRE}
MF	Toni Firmansyah	14 January 2005 (age 21)	0	0	(Indonesia) Persebaya Surabaya	2026 ASEAN Championship^{PRE}
MF	Taufik Rustam	21 February 2005 (age 21)	0	0	(Indonesia) Java United	2026 ASEAN Championship^{PRE}
MF	Rivaldo Pakpahan	20 January 2003 (age 23)	1	0	(Indonesia) Borneo Samarinda	v. Oman, 5 June 2026^{PRE}
FW	Jens Raven	12 October 2005 (age 21)	3	1	(Indonesia) Bali United	2026 ASEAN Championship
FW	Rafael Struick	27 March 2003 (age 23)	26	1	(Indonesia) Dewa United Banten	2026 ASEAN Championship^{PRE}
FW	Ramadhan Sananta	27 November 2002 (age 23)	20	6	(Indonesia) Persebaya Surabaya	2026 ASEAN Championship^{PRE}
FW	Hokky Caraka	21 August 2004 (age 22)	11	2	(Indonesia) Persita Tangerang	2026 ASEAN Championship^{PRE}
FW	Arkhan Kaka	2 September 2007 (age 19)	2	0	(Indonesia) Garudayaksa	2026 ASEAN Championship^{PRE}
FW	Eksel Runtukahu	2 September 1998 (age 28)	0	0	(Indonesia) Persija Jakarta	2026 ASEAN Championship^{PRE}
FW	Mauro Zijlstra	9 November 2004 (age 22)	5	1	(Indonesia) Arema	2026 ASEAN Championship^{PRE / INJ}
FW	Stefano Lilipaly	10 January 1990 (age 36)	34	3	(Indonesia) Semen Padang	v. Saint Kitts and Nevis, 27 March 2026^{PRE}
FW	Ezra Walian	22 October 1997 (age 29)	9	3	(Indonesia) Persik Kediri	v. Saint Kitts and Nevis, 27 March 2026^{PRE}
FW	Adrian Wibowo	17 January 2006 (age 20)	1	0	(Austria) Wacker Innsbruck	v. Saint Kitts and Nevis, 27 March 2026^{PRE}
FW	Miliano Jonathans	5 April 2004 (age 22)	4	0	(Netherlands) Utrecht	v. Saint Kitts and Nevis, 27 March 2026^{PRE / INJ}
Notes: ^{PRE} = Preliminary squad; ^{SUS} = Suspended; ^{INJ} = Withdrew from the roster due to an injury; ^{UNF} = Withdrew from the roster due to unfit condition; ^{RET} = Retired from the national team; ^{WD} = Withdrew from the roster for non-injury related reasons

== Individual records ==
As of 5 October 2026
Players in bold are still playing for the national team.

=== Most appearances ===
Abdul Kadir is Indonesia's most capped player and all-time top scorer.

Rank	Player	Caps	Goals	Career
1	Abdul Kadir	111	70	1967–1979
2	Iswadi Idris	97	55	1968–1980
3	Bambang Pamungkas	86	38	1999–2012
4	Kainun Waskito	80	31	1967–1977
5	Jacob Sihasale	70	23	1966–1974
6	Firman Utina	66	5	2001–2014
7	**Rizky Ridho**	61	5	2021–present
7	Soetjipto Soentoro	61	37	1965–1970
7	Ponaryo Astaman	61	2	2003–2013
10	Hendro Kartiko	60	0	1996–2011

=== Top goalscorers ===
Rank	Player	Goals	Caps	Ratio	Career
1	Abdul Kadir (list)	70	111	0.63	1967–1979
2	Iswadi Idris (list)	55	97	0.57	1968–1980
3	Bambang Pamungkas	38	86	0.44	1999–2012
4	Soetjipto Soentoro	37	61	0.61	1965–1970
5	Kurniawan Dwi Yulianto	33	59	0.56	1995–2005
6	Kainun Waskito	31	80	0.39	1967–1977
7	Risdianto	27	59	0.45	1971–1981
8	Henky Timisela	23	55	0.42	1958–1962
8	Jacob Sihasale	23	70	0.33	1966–1974
10	Omo Suratmo	21	31	0.61	1957–1962

== Competitive record ==
=== FIFA World Cup ===
FIFA World Cup record										Qualification record					
Year	Result	Position	Pld	W	D	L	GF	GA	Squad	Pld	W	D	L	GF	GA
as Dutch East Indies
(Uruguay) 1930	Did not enter									Did not enter					
(Italy) 1934	Did not enter									Did not enter					
(France) 1938	Round of 16	15th	1	0	0	1	0	6	Squad	Qualified automatically					
as Indonesia
(Brazil) 1950	Did not enter									Did not enter					
(Switzerland) 1954	Did not enter									Did not enter					
(Sweden) 1958	Withdrew									3	1	1	1	5	4
(Chile) 1962	Did not enter									Did not enter					
(England) 1966	Did not enter									Did not enter					
(Mexico) 1970	Did not enter									Did not enter					
(West Germany) 1974	Did not qualify									6	1	2	3	6	13
(Argentina) 1978	Did not qualify									4	1	1	2	7	7
(Spain) 1982	Did not qualify									8	2	2	4	5	14
(Mexico) 1986	Did not qualify									8	4	1	3	9	10
(Italy) 1990	Did not qualify									6	1	3	2	5	10
(United States) 1994	Did not qualify									8	1	0	7	6	19
(France) 1998	Did not qualify									6	1	4	1	11	6
(South Korea) (Japan) 2002	Did not qualify									6	4	0	2	16	7
(Germany) 2006	Did not qualify									6	2	1	3	8	12
(South Africa) 2010	Did not qualify									2	0	0	2	1	11
(Brazil) 2014	Did not qualify									8	1	1	6	8	30
(Russia) 2018	Disqualified due to FIFA suspension									Disqualified					
(Qatar) 2022	Did not qualify									8	0	1	7	5	27
(Canada) (Mexico) (United States) 2026	Did not qualify									20	8	4	8	31	32
(Morocco) (Portugal) (Spain) 2030	To be determined									To be determined					
(Saudi Arabia) 2034	To be determined									To be determined					
Total	Round of 16	1/23	1	0	0	1	0	6	—	99	27	21	51	123	202

FIFA World Cup history
First match	Hungary 6–0 Dutch East Indies (5 June 1938; Reims, France)
Biggest win	—
Biggest defeat	Hungary 6–0 Dutch East Indies (5 June 1938; Reims, France)
Best result	Round of 16 (1938)
Worst result	—

=== AFC Asian Cup ===
AFC Asian Cup record										Qualification record					
Year	Result	Position	Pld	W	D	L	GF	GA	Squad	Pld	W	D	L	GF	GA
(Hong Kong) 1956	Did not enter									Did not enter					
(South Korea) 1960	Did not enter									Did not enter					
(Israel) 1964	Did not enter									Did not enter					
(Iran) 1968	Did not qualify									4	1	1	2	10	6
(Thailand) 1972	Did not qualify									5	3	0	2	12	6
(Iran) 1976	Did not qualify									4	1	1	2	3	5
(Kuwait) 1980	Did not qualify									3	0	0	3	3	10
(Singapore) 1984	Did not qualify									5	3	0	2	6	5
(Qatar) 1988	Did not qualify									3	1	1	1	1	4
(Japan) 1992	Did not qualify									3	1	1	1	3	4
(United Arab Emirates) 1996	Group stage	11th	3	0	1	2	4	8	Squad	2	1	1	0	7	1
(Lebanon) 2000	Group stage	11th	3	0	1	2	0	7	Squad	4	3	1	0	18	5
(China) 2004	Group stage	11th	3	1	0	2	3	9	Squad	6	3	1	2	9	13
(Indonesia) (Malaysia) (Thailand) (Vietnam) 2007	Group stage	11th	3	1	0	2	3	4	Squad	Qualified as co-hosts					
(Qatar) 2011	Did not qualify									6	0	3	3	3	6
(Australia) 2015	Did not qualify									6	0	1	5	2	8
(United Arab Emirates) 2019	Disqualified due to FIFA suspension									Disqualified					
(Qatar) 2023	Round of 16	16th	4	1	0	3	3	10	Squad	13	4	1	8	19	30
(Saudi Arabia) 2027	Qualified									8	5	1	2	20	8
Total	Round of 16	6/19	16	3	2	11	13	38	—	72	26	13	33	116	111

AFC Asian Cup history
First match	Indonesia 2–2 Kuwait (4 December 1996; Abu Dhabi, United Arab Emirates)
Biggest win	Indonesia 2–1 Qatar (18 July 2004; Beijing, China); Indonesia 2–1 Bahrain (10 July 2007; Jakarta, Indonesia); Indonesia 1–0 Vietnam (19 January 2024; Doha, Qatar)
Biggest defeat	China 5–0 Indonesia (21 July 2004; Beijing, China)
Best result	Round of 16 (2023)
Worst result	Group stage (1996, 2000, 2004, 2007)

=== FIFA ASEAN Cup ===
FIFA ASEAN Cup record
Year	Result	Position	Pld	W	D	L	GF	GA	Squad
(Indonesia) 2026	Champions	1st	4	2	2	0	13	4	Squad
Total	1 Titles	1/1	4	2	2	0	13	4	—

FIFA ASEAN Cup history
First match	Indonesia 2–0 Singapore (25 September 2026; Jakarta, Indonesia)
Biggest win	Indonesia 9–2 Bangladesh (1 October 2026; Jakarta, Indonesia)
Biggest defeat	—
Best result	Champions (2026)
Worst result	—

=== ASEAN Championship ===
ASEAN Championship record
Year	Result	Position	Pld	W	D	L	GF	GA	Squad
(Singapore) 1996	Fourth place	4th	6	3	1	2	18	9	Squad
(Vietnam) 1998	Third place	3rd	5	2	1	2	15	10	Squad
(Thailand) 2000	Runners-up	2nd	5	3	0	2	13	10	Squad
(Indonesia) (Singapore) 2002	Runners-up	2nd	6	3	3	0	22	7	Squad
(Malaysia) (Vietnam) 2004	Runners-up	2nd	8	4	1	3	24	8	Squad
(Singapore) (Thailand) 2007	Group stage	5th	3	1	2	0	6	4	Squad
(Indonesia) (Thailand) 2008	Semi-finals	4th	5	2	0	3	8	5	Squad
(Indonesia) (Vietnam) 2010	Runners-up	2nd	7	6	0	1	17	6	Squad
(Malaysia) (Thailand) 2012	Group stage	5th	3	1	1	1	3	4	Squad
(Singapore) (Vietnam) 2014	Group stage	5th	3	1	1	1	7	7	Squad
(Myanmar) (Philippines) 2016	Runners-up	2nd	7	3	2	2	12	13	Squad
(ASEAN) 2018	Group stage	7th	4	1	1	2	5	6	Squad
(Singapore) 2020	Runners-up	2nd	8	4	3	1	20	13	Squad
(ASEAN) 2022	Semi-finals	4th	6	3	2	1	12	5	Squad
(ASEAN) 2024	Group stage	7th	4	1	1	2	4	5	Squad
(ASEAN) 2026	Group stage	5th	4	2	1	1	9	5	Squad
Total	Runners-up	16/16	89	42	20	24	202	118	—

ASEAN Championship history
First match	Indonesia 5–1 Laos (2 September 1996; Jurong, Singapore)
Biggest win	Indonesia 13–1 Philippines (23 December 2002; Jakarta, Indonesia)
Biggest defeat	Philippines 4–0 Indonesia (25 November 2014; Hanoi, Vietnam); Thailand 4–0 Indonesia (29 December 2021; Kallang, Singapore)
Best result	Runners-up (2000, 2002, 2004, 2010, 2016, 2020)
Worst result	Group stage (2007, 2012, 2014, 2018, 2024, 2026)

=== Olympic Games ===
Olympic Games record										Qualification record					
Year	Result	Position	Pld	W	D	L	GF	GA	Squad	Pld	W	D	L	GF	GA
1900 to 1952	Did not enter									Did not enter					
(Australia) 1956	Quarter-finals	7th	2	0	1	1	0	4	Squad	Qualified automatically					
(Italy) 1960	Did not qualify									2	0	0	2	2	6
(Japan) 1964	Did not enter									Did not enter					
(Mexico) 1968	Did not qualify									4	1	1	2	4	5
(West Germany) 1972	Did not qualify									4	2	0	2	8	6
(Canada) 1976	Did not qualify									4	2	1	1	11	5
(Soviet Union) 1980	Did not qualify									5	1	0	4	7	12
(United States) 1984	Did not qualify									8	0	3	5	3	14
(South Korea) 1988	Did not qualify									4	1	0	3	3	8
Since 1992	See Indonesia national under-23 football team														
Total	Quarter-finals	1/17	2	0	1	1	0	4	—	31	7	5	19	38	56

Olympic Games history
First match	Soviet Union 0–0 Indonesia (29 November 1956; Melbourne, Australia)
Last match	Soviet Union 4–0 Indonesia (1 December 1956; Melbourne, Australia)
Biggest win	—
Biggest defeat	Soviet Union 4–0 Indonesia (1 December 1956; Melbourne, Australia)
Best result	Quarter-finals (1956)
Worst result	—

=== Asian Games ===
Asian Games record
Year	Result	Position	Pld	W	D	L	GF	GA	Squad
(India) 1951	Quarter-finals	6th	1	0	0	1	0	3	Squad
(Philippines) 1954	Fourth place	4th	4	2	0	2	15	12	Squad
(Japan) 1958	Bronze medal	3rd	5	4	0	1	15	7	Squad
(Indonesia) 1962	Group stage	5th	3	2	0	1	9	3	Squad
(Thailand) 1966	Quarter-finals	5th	5	2	2	1	8	4	Squad
(Thailand) 1970	Quarter-finals	5th	5	1	2	2	4	7	Squad
(Iran) 1974	Did not participate								
(Thailand) 1978	Did not participate								
(India) 1982	Did not participate								
(South Korea) 1986	Fourth place	4th	6	1	2	3	4	14	Squad
(China) 1990	Did not participate								
(Japan) 1994	Did not participate								
(Thailand) 1998	Did not participate								
Since 2002	See Indonesia national under-23 football team								
Total	Bronze medal	7/13	29	12	6	11	55	50	—

Asian Games history
First match	India 3–0 Indonesia (5 March 1951; New Delhi, India)
Last match	Kuwait 5–0 Indonesia (4 October 1986; Seoul, South Korea)
Biggest win	Indonesia 6–0 Philippines (27 August 1962; Jakarta, Indonesia)
Biggest defeat	Kuwait 5–0 Indonesia (4 October 1986; Seoul, South Korea)
Best result	Bronze medal (1958)
Worst result	Group stage (1962)

=== SEA Games ===
SEA Games record
Year	Result	Position	Pld	W	D	L	GF	GA
1959 to 1975	Did not participate							
(Malaysia) 1977	Fourth place	4th	4	2	2	0	8	3
(Indonesia) 1979	Silver medal	2nd	6	2	2	2	6	5
(Philippines) 1981	Bronze medal	3rd	4	3	0	1	5	2
(Singapore) 1983	Group stage	5th	3	1	1	1	3	7
(Thailand) 1985	Fourth place	4th	4	0	1	3	1	10
(Indonesia) 1987	Gold medal	1st	4	3	1	0	7	1
(Malaysia) 1989	Bronze medal	3rd	5	2	1	2	12	5
(Philippines) 1991	Gold medal	1st	5	3	2	0	5	1
(Singapore) 1993	Fourth place	4th	5	2	1	2	6	6
(Thailand) 1995	Group stage	6th	4	2	0	2	14	3
(Indonesia) 1997	Silver medal	2nd	6	4	2	0	16	6
(Brunei) 1999	Bronze medal	3rd	6	3	2	1	11	2
Since 2001	See Indonesia national under-23 football team							
Total	Gold medal	12/20	56	27	15	14	94	51

SEA Games history
First match	Indonesia 2–1 Malaysia (19 November 1977; Kuala Lumpur, Malaysia)
Last match	Indonesia 0–0 (4–3 pen.) Singapore (14 August 1999; Bandar Seri Begawan, Brunei)
Biggest win	Indonesia 10–0 Cambodia (6 December 1995; Thailand)
Biggest defeat	Thailand 7–0 Indonesia (15 December 1985; Bangkok, Thailand)
Best result	Gold medal (1987, 1991)
Worst result	Group stage (1983, 1995)

== Head-to-head record ==
As of 5 October 2026 after match against Thailand. (Note: Does not include B team, selection, junior, club, etc.)

More wins Wins equal losses More losses

Indonesia national football team head-to-head records
Against	First	Last	GP	W	D	L	GF	GA	GD	% Win	Confederation
Afghanistan	2021	2021	2	0	0	2	2	4	−2	0%	AFC
Algeria	1986	1986	1	0	0	1	0	1	−1	0%	CAF
Andorra	2014	2014	1	1	0	0	1	0	1	100%	UEFA
Argentina	2023	2023	1	0	0	1	0	2	−2	0%	CONMEBOL
Australia	1967	2025	18	1	4	13	7	39	−32	16.67%	AFC
Bahrain	1980	2025	9	3	3	3	10	19	−9	50%	AFC
Bangladesh	1975	2026	7	5	1	1	20	5	15	78.57%	AFC
Bhutan	2003	2003	2	2	0	0	4	0	4	100%	AFC
Bosnia and Herzegovina	1997	1997	1	0	0	1	0	2	−2	0%	UEFA
Brunei	1971	2023	13	9	2	2	52	6	46	76.92%	AFC
Bulgaria	1973	2026	2	0	0	2	0	5	−5	0%	UEFA
Burundi	2023	2023	2	1	1	0	5	3	2	75%	CAF
Cambodia	1966	2026	25	20	3	2	96	18	78	86%	AFC
Cameroon	2012	2015	2	0	1	1	0	1	−1	25%	CAF
China	1934	2025	18	2	3	13	13	38	−25	19.44%	AFC
Chinese Taipei	1954	2025	15	11	0	4	37	14	23	73.33%	AFC
Croatia	1956	1956	1	0	0	1	2	5	−3	0%	UEFA
Czech Republic (Note: Includes matches against Czechoslovakia.)	1974	1974	1	0	1	0	1	1	0	50%	UEFA
Cuba	2014	2014	1	0	0	1	0	1	−1	0%	CONCACAF
Curaçao	2022	2022	2	2	0	0	5	3	2	100%	CONCACAF
Denmark	1974	1974	1	0	0	1	0	9	−9	0%	UEFA
Dominican Republic	2014	2014	1	0	1	0	1	1	0	50%	CONCACAF
East Germany	1956	1959	2	0	1	1	3	5	−2	25%	UEFA
Egypt (Note: Includes matches against United Arab Republic.)	1963	1963	2	0	1	1	3	5	−2	25%	CAF
Estonia	1996	1999	2	0	1	1	0	3	−3	25%	UEFA
Fiji	1981	2017	3	0	3	0	3	3	0	50%	OFC
Guinea	1966	1966	1	0	0	1	1	3	−2	0%	CAF
Guyana	2017	2017	1	1	0	0	2	1	1	100%	CONCACAF
Hong Kong	1957	2018	19	10	4	5	36	27	9	63.16%	AFC
Hungary	1938	1938	1	0	0	1	0	6	−6	0%	UEFA
Iceland	2018	2018	2	0	0	2	1	10	−9	0%	UEFA
India	1951	2004	21	10	2	9	41	36	5	52.38%	AFC
Iran	1956	2024	6	0	1	5	3	16	−13	8.33%	AFC
Iraq	1968	2025	14	2	4	8	11	27	−16	28.57%	AFC
Israel	1972	1972	1	0	0	1	0	1	−1	0%	UEFA
Jamaica	2007	2007	1	1	0	0	2	1	1	100%	CONCACAF
Japan	1934	2025	19	4	2	13	24	48	−24	26.32%	AFC
Jordan	2004	2022	5	0	0	5	2	13	−11	0%	AFC
Kyrgyzstan	2013	2013	1	1	0	0	4	0	4	100%	AFC
Kuwait	1980	2022	7	2	3	2	8	12	−4	50%	AFC
Laos	1969	2024	11	9	2	0	48	12	36	90.91%	AFC
Lebanon	2025	2025	1	0	1	0	0	0	0	50%	AFC
Liberia	1984	2007	2	1	0	1	3	3	0	50%	CAF
Libya	2024	2024	2	0	0	2	1	6	−5	0%	CAF
Lithuania	1996	1999	2	0	1	1	2	6	−4	25%	UEFA
Malaysia	1957	2026	79	36	19	24	132	102	30	57.59%	AFC
Maldives	2001	2010	3	3	0	0	10	0	10	100%	AFC
Mali	1963	1963	1	1	0	0	3	2	1	100%	CAF
Mauritania	2012	2012	1	1	0	0	2	0	2	100%	CAF
Mauritius	2018	2018	1	1	0	0	1	0	1	100%	CAF
Moldova	1996	2003	2	1	0	1	5	2	−1	50%	UEFA
Morocco	1980	1980	1	0	0	1	0	2	−2	0%	CAF
Mongolia	2017	2017	1	1	0	0	3	2	1	100%	AFC
Mozambique	2026	2026	1	1	0	0	1	0	1	100%	CAF
Myanmar	1951	2024	47	21	9	17	86	63	23	54.26%	AFC
Netherlands	1938	2013	2	0	0	2	2	12	−12	0%	UEFA
Nepal	2014	2022	2	2	0	0	9	0	9	100%	AFC
New Zealand	1972	1997	9	2	5	2	8	9	−1	50%	OFC
Nigeria	1983	1983	1	0	0	1	1	2	−1	0%	CAF
North Korea	1963	2012	11	0	2	9	5	25	−20	9.09%	AFC
Oman	1987	2026	7	3	1	3	10	6	4	50%	AFC
Pakistan	1960	2014	5	4	1	0	15	3	12	90%	AFC
Palestine	2011	2023	3	1	1	1	5	3	2	50%	AFC
Papua New Guinea	1975	1984	2	1	0	1	8	3	5	50%	OFC
Paraguay	1986	1986	1	0	0	1	2	3	−1	0%	CONMEBOL
Philippines	1934	2024	31	23	5	3	100	21	79	82.26%	AFC
Puerto Rico	2017	2017	1	0	1	0	0	0	0	50%	CONCACAF
Qatar	1986	2014	7	1	2	4	9	18	−9	28.57%	AFC
Russia (Note: Includes matches against Soviet Union.)	1956	1976	3	0	2	1	0	4	−4	33.33%	UEFA
Saint Kitts and Nevis	2026	2026	1	1	0	0	4	0	4	100%	CONCACAF
Saudi Arabia	1983	2025	17	2	4	11	12	37	−25	23.53%	AFC
Senegal	1982	1982	1	0	1	0	2	2	0	50%	CAF
Serbia (Note: Includes matches against Yugoslavia and Serbia and Montenegro.)	1956	1956	2	0	0	2	3	9	−6	0%	UEFA
Singapore	1958	2026	63	34	12	17	120	72	48	63.49%	AFC
South Korea	1953	2007	37	3	5	29	22	87	−65	14.86%	AFC
Sri Lanka	1964	2004	6	5	1	0	29	6	23	91.67%	AFC
Syria	1978	2014	5	1	0	4	3	15	−12	20%	AFC
Tanzania	1997	2024	2	1	1	0	3	1	2	75%	CAF
Thailand	1957	2026	98	32	19	47	123	169	−46	42.35%	AFC
Timor-Leste	2010	2026	7	7	0	0	24	2	22	100%	AFC
Turkmenistan	2004	2023	5	3	1	1	11	8	3	70%	AFC
United Arab Emirates	1981	2021	5	1	1	3	8	16	−8	30%	AFC
United States	1956	1983	2	1	1	0	9	7	2	75%	CONCACAF
Uruguay	1974	2010	3	1	0	2	5	11	−6	33.33%	CONMEBOL
Uzbekistan	1997	1997	2	0	1	1	1	4	−3	25%	AFC
Vanuatu	2019	2019	1	1	0	0	6	0	6	100%	OFC
Vietnam (Note: Includes matches against North Vietnam and South Vietnam.)	1957	2026	51	21	13	17	75	67	8	53.92%	AFC
Yemen (Note: Includes matches against South Yemen.)	1987	2014	7	3	4	0	8	3	5	71.43%	AFC
Zimbabwe	1997	1997	1	0	1	0	0	0	0	50%	CAF
88 countries	1934	2026	877	336	169	363	1431	1432	–1	38.31%	FIFA

== Honours ==
=== Continental ===
- Asian Games
  - (bronze) Bronze medal: 1958

=== Regional ===
- FIFA ASEAN Cup
  - (gold) Champions: 2026
- ASEAN Championship
  - (silver) Runners-up: 2000, 2002, 2004, 2010, 2016, 2020
  - (bronze) Third place: 1998
- SEA Games
  - (gold) Gold medal: 1987, 1991
  - (silver) Silver medal: 1979, 1997
  - (bronze) Bronze medal: 1981, 1989, 1999

=== Friendly ===
- FIFA Series
  - Runners-up: 2026
- South Vietnam Independence Cup
  - Runners-up: 1962
- Indonesian Independence Cup
  - Champions: 1987, 2000, 2008
  - Runners-up: 1986, 1994
- Aga Khan Gold Cup
  - Champions: 1961
- King's Cup
  - Champions: 1968
  - Runners-up: 1969, 1984
- Jakarta Anniversary Tournament
  - Champions: 1972
  - Runners-up: 1973, 1974, 1978
- Merdeka Tournament
  - Champions: 1961, 1962, 1969
  - Runners-up: 1957, 2006
  - Third place: 1958
- Myanmar Grand Royal Challenge Cup
  - Runners-up: 2008
- Aceh World Solidarity Tsunami Cup
  - Runners-up: 2017
- Al Nakba Cup
  - Third place: 2012
- Merlion Cup
  - Third place: 1982

== See also ==
- Indonesia national under-23 football team
- Indonesia national under-21 football team
- Indonesia national under-20 football team
- Indonesia national under-17 football team
- Indonesia national under-15 football team
- Indonesia women's national football team
- Indonesia women's national futsal team
- Indonesia national beach soccer team
- Indonesia national futsal team

Achievements
Preceded by Inaugural Champions	FIFA ASEAN Cup Champions; 2026 (First title)	Succeeded by 2030
Preceded by 1985 Thailand	Southeast Asian Games Champions; 1987 (First title)	Succeeded by 1989 Malaysia
Preceded by 1989 Malaysia	Southeast Asian Games Champions; 1991 (Second title)	Succeeded by 1993 Thailand
