= Harry Tjong =

Indonesian football manager (born 1939)

Personal information
- Date of birth: 24 September 1939 (age 87)
- Place of birth: Indonesia

Senior career*
Years	Team	Apps	(Gls)
- PSM Makassar

Managerial career
- 1981–1982: Indonesia
- * Club domestic league appearances and goals

Harry Tjong (born 24 September 1939) is an Indonesian former football manager and player.

== Career ==
Tjong managed the Indonesia national team and is the father of Indonesian manager Eduard Tjong.
