= Indonesia national football team results (1980–1999) =

This article provides details of international football games played by the Indonesia national football team from 1980 to 1999.

== Results ==
Key
Win
Draw
Defeat

=== 1980 ===
21 March 1980 Summer Olympics qualification	Malaysia	6–1	Indonesia	Kuala Lumpur, Malaysia
--:-- UTC+8	Khalid Ali 20', 44', 80'; Hassan Sani 30', 48', 69'		Keltjes 85'	Stadium: Stadium Merdeka

24 March 1980 Summer Olympics qualification	Indonesia	2–3	Brunei	Kuala Lumpur, Malaysia
--:-- UTC+8	Meetu Duaramuri 7'; Dede Sulaeman 34'	Report	Roslan 26' 33' 57'	Stadium: Stadium Merdeka

28 March 1980 Summer Olympics qualification	Indonesia	0–2	Japan	Kuala Lumpur, Malaysia
--:-- UTC+8			Hideki Maeda 15'; Kazushi Kimura 65'	Stadium: Stadium Merdeka; Attendance: 4.000

31 March 1980 Summer Olympics qualification	Indonesia	4–0	Philippines	Kuala Lumpur, Malaysia
--:-- UTC+8	Sofyan Hadi 64'; Suwardi Rosdiana 71', 87'; Hadi Ismanto 76'	Report		Stadium: Stadium Merdeka; Attendance: 10,000

3 April 1980 Summer Olympics qualification	Indonesia	0–1	South Korea	Kuala Lumpur, Malaysia
--:-- UTC+8			Cho Kwang-rae 55'	Stadium: Stadium Merdeka

25 August 1980 President's Cup	South Korea	3–0	Indonesia	Chuncheon, South Korea
16:30 UTC+9	Choi Soon-ho 19'; Chung Hae-won 40'; Lee Kang-jo 83' (pen.)	Report		Stadium: Chuncheon Civic Stadium; Attendance: 25,000

2 September 1980 President's Cup Final	South Korea	2–0	Indonesia	Seoul, South Korea
18:00 UTC+9	Chung Hae-won 30'; Lee Kang-jo 89'	Report		Stadium: Dongdaemun Stadium; Attendance: 10,000

19 October 1980 Merdeka Tournament	Indonesia	2–1	Kuwait	Kuala Lumpur, Malaysia
--:-- UTC+8	Zulham Effendi 40'; Hadi Ismanto 58'		Tareq 78'	Stadium: Stadium Merdeka

21 October 1980 Merdeka Tournament	New Zealand	0–0	Indonesia	Kuala Lumpur, Malaysia
--:-- UTC+8				Stadium: Stadium Merdeka; Attendance: 12,000

23 October 1980 Merdeka Tournament	Malaysia	1–1	Indonesia	Kuala Lumpur, Malaysia
--:-- UTC+8	Hassan Sani 42'	Report	Pattinasarany 58'	Stadium: Stadium Merdeka

26 October 1980 Merdeka Tournament	Indonesia	1–1	Thailand	Kuala Lumpur, Malaysia
--:-- UTC+8	Hadi Ismanto 55'	Report	Boonum Suksawat 75'	Stadium: Stadium Merdeka

29 October 1980 Merdeka Tournament	Indonesia	0–2	Morocco	Kuala Lumpur, Malaysia
--:-- UTC+8			Marzak Abdel Illah 15'; Taissir Abdul Kbir 33'	Stadium: Stadium Merdeka

7 December Friendly	Indonesia	1–1	Australia	Jakarta, Indonesia
--:-- UTC+7	Zulham Effendi 5'		Henderson 13'	Stadium: Gelora Senayan Stadium; Attendance: 60,000; Referee: Kossain Katradiredja (Indonesia)

12 December Friendly	Saudi Arabia	8–0	Indonesia	Riyadh, Saudi Arabia
		Report		Stadium: Prince Faisal bin Fahd Stadium

14 December Friendly	Saudi Arabia	3–0	Indonesia	Jeddah, Saudi Arabia
		Report		Stadium: Prince Abdullah Al Faisal Stadium; Referee: Metheb Al-Jaeed (Saudi Arabia)

=== 1981 ===
11 May 1982 FIFA World Cup qualification	Indonesia	0–2	New Zealand	Jakarta, Indonesia
--:-- UTC+7			B. Turner 14'; G. Turner 75'	Stadium: Gelora Senayan Stadium; Attendance: 47,000; Referee: N. Ausukont (Thailand)

20 May 1982 FIFA World Cup qualification	Australia	2–0	Indonesia	Melbourne, Australia
--:-- UTC+10	Kosmina 29'; Davidson 33'			Stadium: Olympic Park; Attendance: 10,000; Referee: V. Garcia Oliveira (Portugal)

23 May 1982 FIFA World Cup qualification	New Zealand	5–0	Indonesia	Auckland, New Zealand
--:-- UTC+13	Wooddin 9'; B. Turner 34'; G. Turner 59', 65'; Elrick 81'			Stadium: Mount Smart Stadium; Attendance: 4,742; Referee: V. Garcia Oliveira (Portugal)

31 May 1982 FIFA World Cup qualification	Fiji	0–0	Indonesia	Suva, Fiji
--:-- UTC+12				Attendance: 8,000; Referee: Lee Kok Leong (Singapore)

15 June 1982 FIFA World Cup qualification	Indonesia	1–0	Chinese Taipei	Jakarta, Indonesia
--:-- UTC+7	Ismanto 75'			Stadium: Gelora Senayan Stadium; Attendance: 7,500; Referee: Charupunt (Thailand)

28 June 1982 FIFA World Cup qualification	Chinese Taipei	2–0	Indonesia	Taipei, Chinese Taipei
--:-- UTC+8	Deng Chyan; Jyn Tson			Referee: Nishi (Japan)

10 August 1982 FIFA World Cup qualification	Indonesia	3–3	Fiji	Jakarta, Indonesia
--:-- UTC+7	Johannis; Upendran Choy (o.g.); Risdianto		Ratu Jone; Meli Vuilabasa; John Morris Williams	Stadium: Gelora Senayan Stadium; Attendance: 16,000; Referee: T. Gurkan (Philippines)

14 August 1981 Jakarta Anniversary Tournament	Indonesia	3–0	Philippines	Jakarta, Indonesia
--:-- UTC+7	Goal			Stadium: Gelora Senayan Stadium

20 August 1981 Jakarta Anniversary Tournament	Indonesia	0–1	South Korea	Jakarta, Indonesia
--:-- UTC+7			Goal	Stadium: Gelora Senayan Stadium

30 August 1982 FIFA World Cup qualification	Indonesia	1–0	Australia	Jakarta, Indonesia
--:-- UTC+7	Risdianto 88'			Stadium: Gelora Senayan Stadium; Attendance: 25,000; Referee: R. Reyes (Philippines)

2 September 1981 Merdeka Tournament	United Arab Emirates	2–5	Indonesia	Kuala Lumpur, Malaysia
--:-- UTC+8	Ali 22'; Salim Khalifa 88'	Report	Stefanus Sirey 16', 67', 83'; Pattinasarany 30'; Nere 90+1'	Stadium: Stadium Merdeka

7 September 1981 Merdeka Tournament	New Zealand	0–0	Indonesia	Kuala Lumpur, Malaysia
--:-- UTC+8		Report		Stadium: Stadium Merdeka

9 September 1981 Merdeka Tournament	Indonesia	0–2	Malaysia	Kuala Lumpur, Malaysia
--:-- UTC+8		Report	Dahari 52'; Nasir 82'	Stadium: Stadium Merdeka

11 September 1981 Merdeka Tournament	India	1–0	Indonesia	Kuala Lumpur, Malaysia
--:-- UTC+8	Goal	Report		Stadium: Stadium Merdeka

14 September 1981 Merdeka Tournament	Japan	2–0	Indonesia	Kuala Lumpur, Malaysia
--:-- UTC+8	Goal	Report		Stadium: Stadium Merdeka

7 December 1981 Sea Games GS	Indonesia	1–0	Singapore	Manila, Philippines
--:-- UTC+8	Taufik Saleh 62'			Stadium: Rizal Memorial Stadium

11 December 1981 Sea Games GS	Indonesia	2–0	Philippines	Manila, Philippines
--:-- UTC+8	Taufik Saleh 33'; Robby Binur 83'			Stadium: Rizal Memorial Stadium

13 December 1981 Sea Games SF	Thailand	2–0	Indonesia	Manila, Philippines
--:-- UTC+8	Goal			Stadium: Rizal Memorial Stadium

14 December 1981 Sea Games Bronze Medal	Indonesia	2–0	Singapore	Manila, Philippines
--:-- UTC+8	Nere 11'; Stefanus Sirey 68'			Stadium: Rizal Memorial Stadium

=== 1982 ===
5 August 1982 Merdeka Tournament	Malaysia	0–2	Indonesia	Kuala Lumpur, Malaysia
--:-- UTC+8		Report	Wolter Sulu	Stadium: Stadium Merdeka

11 August 1982 Merdeka Tournament	Senegal	2–2	Indonesia	Kuala Lumpur, Malaysia
--:-- UTC+8	Lamine Dabo 83', 89'	Report	Agusman 25'; Mundari 59'	Stadium: Stadium Merdeka; Attendance: 4.000

14 August 1982 Merdeka Tournament	Indonesia	1–2	United Arab Emirates	Kuala Lumpur, Malaysia
--:-- UTC+8	Nusyirwan 46'	Report	Adnan Toliaini 10', 59'	Stadium: Stadium Merdeka

9 October 1982 Merlion Cup	Indonesia	0–0	Thailand	Kallang, Singapore
--:-- UTC+8		Report		Stadium: National Stadium

11 October 1982 Merlion Cup	Indonesia	0–2	Australia	Kallang, Singapore
--:-- UTC+8		Report	Mitchell 73', 77'	Stadium: National Stadium; Attendance: 5,000

17 October 1982 Merlion Cup	Indonesia	0–0 (a.e.t.) (4–3 p)	Malaysia	Kallang, Singapore
--:-- UTC+7				Stadium: National Stadium

=== 1983 ===
29 May 1983 Sea Games GS	Thailand	5–0	Indonesia	Kallang, Singapore
--:-- UTC+8	Banharn Somprasong 5'; Chuayboonchum 30'; Piyapong 44', 90'; Chalor Hongkajohn 87'			Stadium: National Stadium

31 May 1983 Sea Games GS	Indonesia	2–1	Burma	Kallang, Singapore
--:-- UTC+8	Riono Asnan 46' (pen.); Djoko Malis 76'		Tin Hlang 70'	Stadium: National Stadium

2 June 1983 Sea Games GS	Indonesia	1–1	Brunei	Kallang, Singapore
--:-- UTC+8	Riono Asnan 77'		Zulkifli Arifin 61'	Stadium: National Stadium

8 June 1983 President's Cup	Thailand	3–0	Indonesia	Seoul, South Korea
16:30 UTC+9	Goal			Stadium: Dongdaemun Stadium

12 June 1983 President's Cup	South Korea	3–0	Indonesia	Jeonju, South Korea
20:00 UTC+9	Lee Sang-yong 19', 54'; Ahn Byung-tae 58'	Report		Stadium: Jeonju Sports Complex

06 October 1984 Olympics Qualification	Indonesia	1–1	Saudi Arabia	Jakarta, Indonesia
20:00 UTC+9	Dede Sulaiman 57'	Report	Fahed Mosaibeih 84'	Stadium: Senayan Stadium

16 October 1984 Olympics Qualification	Indonesia	1–1	Malaysia	Kallang, Singapore
20:00 UTC+9	Riono 74'		Zainal Abidin Hassan 84'	Stadium: National Stadium; Attendance: 10.000; Referee: Gary Fleet (New Zealand)

19 October 1984 Olympics Qualification	Indonesia	0–4	India	Kallang, Singapore
20:00 UTC+9			Ali 11', 19' Sett 40' Biswajit 80'	Stadium: National Stadium; Referee: Gary Fleet (New Zealand)

23 October 1984 Olympics Qualification	Singapore	1–0	Indonesia	Kallang, Singapore
20:00 UTC+9	Au-Yeong Pak Kuan 32'			Stadium: National Stadium; Attendance: 5.000

26 October 1984 Olympics Qualification	Indonesia	1–1	Singapore	Kuala Lumpur, Malaysia
20:00 UTC+9	Dede Sulaiman 32'	Report	K. Kannan 62'	Stadium: Stadium Merdeka; Attendance: 2.000; Referee: M. Nazari (Iran)

28 October 1984 Olympics Qualification	Malaysia	2–0	Indonesia	Kuala Lumpur, Malaysia
20:00 UTC+9	Chen Wooi Haw 42' Hassan 76'			Stadium: Stadium Merdeka

31 October 1984 Olympics Qualification	India	1–0	Indonesia	Kuala Lumpur, Malaysia
20:00 UTC+9	Ali 53'			Stadium: Stadium Merdeka; Attendance: 1.000

23 November 1984 Olympics Qualification	Saudi Arabia	3–0	Indonesia	Riyadh, Saudi Arabia
20:00 UTC+9

3 December 1983 Merlion Cup	Singapore	5–0	Indonesia	Kallang, Singapore
--:-- UTC+8	Goal	Report		Stadium: National Stadium

9 December 1983 Merlion Cup	Indonesia	0–1	Brunei	Kallang, Singapore
--:-- UTC+8		Report	Majidy Ghani 25'	Stadium: National Stadium

=== 1984 ===
6 August 1984 AFC Asian Cup qualification	Indonesia	2–1	Thailand	Jakarta, Indonesia
--:-- UTC+7	Sain Irmis 74'; Danny Bolung 90'		Chalit Suttabun 26'	Stadium: Gelora Senayan Stadium

9 August 1984 AFC Asian Cup qualification	Indonesia	2–1	Bangladesh	Jakarta, Indonesia
--:-- UTC+7	Sain Irmis 31', 58'		Aslam 89'	Stadium: Gelora Senayan Stadium

11 August 1984 AFC Asian Cup qualification	Indonesia	1–0	Philippines	Surakarta, Indonesia
--:-- UTC+7	Noach Meriem 18'			Stadium: Sriwedari Stadium

13 August 1984 AFC Asian Cup qualification	Indonesia	0–1	Iran	Jakarta, Indonesia
--:-- UTC+7			Mohammadkhani 78'	Stadium: Gelora Senayan Stadium

15 August 1984 AFC Asian Cup qualification	Indonesia	1–2	Syria	Jakarta, Indonesia
--:-- UTC+7	Sain Irmis 27'		Kardaghli 78'; Aziz 85'	Stadium: Gelora Senayan Stadium; Attendance: 65,000

22 August 1984 Merdeka Tournament	Indonesia	5–1	Thailand	Kuala Lumpur, Malaysia
--:-- UTC+8	Rumaropen 10'; Surul 15'; Sudrajat 26' (pen.); Maryanto 30'; Yohannis 60'	Report	Pongsawat 5'	Stadium: Stadium Merdeka

26 August 1984 Merdeka Tournament	Malaysia	2–2	Indonesia	Kuala Lumpur, Malaysia
--:-- UTC+8	Hamzah 39'; Hassan 64' (pen.)	Report	Surul 20', 55'	Stadium: Stadium Merdeka

1 September 1984 Merdeka Tournament	Papua New Guinea	1–0	Indonesia	Kuala Lumpur, Malaysia
--:-- UTC+8	Pierre Quaze 45'	Report		Stadium: Stadium Merdeka

4 September 1984 Merdeka Tournament	Liberia	2–1	Indonesia	Kuala Lumpur, Malaysia
--:-- UTC+8	Ferry Syahputra 20' (o.g.); James Farrow 48'	Report	Yohannis 60'	Stadium: Stadium Merdeka

=== 1985 ===
15 March 1986 FIFA World Cup qualification	Indonesia	1–0	Thailand	Jakarta, Indonesia
--:-- UTC+7	Dede Sulaiman 84'	Report		Stadium: Gelora Senayan Stadium; Attendance: 60,000; Referee: Tulu Gurkan (Philippines)

18 March 1986 FIFA World Cup qualification	Indonesia	2–0	Bangladesh	Jakarta, Indonesia
--:-- UTC+7	Nurdiansyah 48'; Dede Sulaiman 57'	Report		Stadium: Gelora Senayan Stadium; Attendance: 40,000; Referee: Cesar Brillantes (Philippines)

21 March 1986 FIFA World Cup qualification	Indonesia	2–1	India	Jakarta, Indonesia
--:-- UTC+7	Nurdiansyah 41' 49'	Report	K. Dey 34'	Stadium: Gelora Senayan Stadium; Attendance: 70,000; Referee: Reynaldo Reyes (Philippines)

29 March 1986 FIFA World Cup qualification	Thailand	0–1	Indonesia	Bangkok, Thailand
--:-- UTC+7		Report	Kiswanto 25'	Stadium: Thai-Japanese Stadium; Referee: Toshikazu Sano (Japan)

2 April 1986 FIFA World Cup qualification	Bangladesh	2–1	Indonesia	Dhaka, Bangladesh
--:-- UTC+6	Hamid 75'; Chunnu 81'	Report	Nurdiansyah 11'	Stadium: Dhaka Stadium; Attendance: 5,000; Referee: Xia Changfa (China)

6 April 1986 FIFA World Cup qualification	India	1–1	Indonesia	Calcutta, India
--:-- UTC+5:30	Thapa 89'	Report	Dede Sulaiman 20'	Stadium: Salt Lake Stadium; Attendance: 10,000; Referee: Farouk Mustafa (Iraq)

21 July 1986 FIFA World Cup qualification	South Korea	2–0	Indonesia	Seoul, South Korea
--:-- UTC+9	Byun Byung-Joo 73'; Kim Joo-Sung 81'	Report		Stadium: Olympic Stadium; Attendance: 80,000; Referee: Booncherd Pratumthong (Thailand)

30 July 1986 FIFA World Cup qualification	Indonesia	1–4	South Korea	Jakarta, Indonesia
--:-- UTC+7	Dede Sulaiman 87'	Report	Byun Byung-Joo 7'; Choi Soon-Ho 9'; Huh Jung-Moo 32'; Kim Joo-Sung 47'	Stadium: Gelora Senayan Stadium; Attendance: 80,000; Referee: Timothy Joseph (Malaysia)

9 December 1985 Sea Games GS	Indonesia	0–1	Singapore	Bangkok, Thailand
--:-- UTC+7			V. Sundramoorthy 54'	Stadium: Suphachalasai Stadium

11 December 1985 Sea Games GS	Brunei	1–1	Indonesia	Bangkok, Thailand
--:-- UTC+7	Goal		Aji Ridwan Mas	Stadium: Suphachalasai Stadium

15 December 1985 Sea Games SF	Thailand	7–0	Indonesia	Bangkok, Thailand
--:-- UTC+7	Prateep Pankhaw 15'; Pichai Kongsri 21', 30', 80'; Surak Chaikitti 27'; Piyapong Pue-on 62', 87'			Stadium: Suphachalasai Stadium

16 December 1985 Sea Games Bronze Medal	Malaysia	1–0	Indonesia	Bangkok, Thailand
--:-- UTC+7	Lim Teong Kim 67'			Stadium: Suphachalasai Stadium

=== 1986 ===
16 February Friendly	Indonesia	2–3	Paraguay	Jakarta, Indonesia
--:-- UTC+7	Ruslan 22'; Yacobi 72'	Report	Hicks 7'; Zabala 14'; Cañete 83'	Stadium: Gelora Senayan Stadium; Attendance: 14,000

20 August 1986 Independence Cup Final	Indonesia	0–1 (a.e.t.)	Algeria	Jakarta, Indonesia
		Report	Bouiche 93'	Stadium: Gelora Senayan Stadium

21 September 1986 Asian Games GS	Qatar	1–1	Indonesia	Gwangju, South Korea
--:-- UTC+9	Salman 29'		Kabo 68'	Stadium: Gwangju Stadium

25 September 1986 Asian Games GS	Indonesia	0–2	Saudi Arabia	Gwangju, South Korea
--:-- UTC+9			Abdullah 84', 87'	Stadium: Gwangju Stadium

27 September 1986 Asian Games GS	Indonesia	1–0	Malaysia	Gwangju, South Korea
--:-- UTC+9	Yonas Sawor 35'			Stadium: Gwangju Stadium

1 October 1986 Asian Games QF	United Arab Emirates	1–1 (a.e.t.) (3–4 p)	Indonesia	Seoul, South Korea
--:-- UTC+9	K. Ghanim 78'		Yacobi 48'	Stadium: Olympic Stadium

3 October 1986 Asian Games SF	South Korea	4–0	Indonesia	Seoul, South Korea
--:-- UTC+9	Cho Kwang-rae 29'; Choi Soon-ho 52', 75'; Lee Tae-ho 67'			Stadium: Olympic Stadium

4 October 1986 Asian Games Bronze Medal	Indonesia	0–5	Kuwait	Seoul, South Korea
--:-- UTC+9			Al-Qabendi 24'; Al-Hajeri 38', 78'; Saad 52'; Al-Hasawi 84'	Stadium: Olympic Stadium

=== 1987 ===
4 April 1988 Summer Olympics qualification	Singapore	2–0	Indonesia	Singapore
--:-- UTC+8	Fandi 63'; V. Sundramoorthy 89'	Report

8 April 1988 Summer Olympics qualification	Japan	3–0	Indonesia	Tokyo, Japan
--:-- UTC+9	Hiromi 42'; Tetsuka 62'; Nobuhiro 89'	Report		Stadium: Tokyo National Stadium

26 April 1988 Summer Olympics qualification	Indonesia	2–1	Singapore	Jakarta, Indonesia
--:-- UTC+7	Waidi; Yacobi 90'	Report	Fandi 55'	Stadium: Gelora Senayan Stadium

26 June 1988 Summer Olympics qualification	Indonesia	1–2	Japan	Jakarta, Indonesia
--:-- UTC+7	Yacobi 49'	Report	Hiromi 75'; Yoshiyuki 86'	Stadium: Gelora Senayan Stadium

17 June 1988 AFC Asian Cup qualification	Indonesia	1–0	South Yemen	Jakarta, Indonesia
--:-- UTC+7	Goal			Stadium: Gelora Senayan Stadium

19 June 1988 AFC Asian Cup qualification	Indonesia	0–0	Bahrain	Jakarta, Indonesia
--:-- UTC+7				Stadium: Gelora Senayan Stadium

22 June 1988 AFC Asian Cup qualification	Indonesia	0–4	South Korea	Jakarta, Indonesia
--:-- UTC+7			Goal	Stadium: Gelora Senayan Stadium

12 September 1987 Sea Games GS	Indonesia	2–0	Brunei	Jakarta, Indonesia
--:-- UTC+7	Goal			Stadium: Gelora Senayan Stadium

14 September 1987 Sea Games GS	Indonesia	0–0	Thailand	Jakarta, Indonesia
--:-- UTC+7				Stadium: Gelora Senayan Stadium

17 September 1987 Sea Games SF	Indonesia	4–1	Burma	Jakarta, Indonesia
--:-- UTC+7	Nere 54'; Kiswanto 61'; Yacobi 68'; Darwia 73'		Than Toe Aung 7'	Stadium: Gelora Senayan Stadium; Attendance: 75,000

20 September 1987 Sea Games Gold Medal	Indonesia	1–0 (a.e.t.)	Malaysia	Jakarta, Indonesia
--:-- UTC+7	Waidi 91'			Stadium: Gelora Senayan Stadium; Attendance: 120,000

=== 1988 ===
5 August 1988 Independence Cup	Indonesia	1–0	Thailand	Jakarta, Indonesia
	Mustaqim 53'	Report		Stadium: Gelora Senayan Stadium

8 December 1988 Merdeka Tournament	Malaysia	0–0	Indonesia	Kuala Lumpur, Malaysia
--:-- UTC+8		Report		Stadium: Stadium Merdeka; Attendance: 7,000; Referee: Abdullah Said (Oman)

12 December 1988 Merdeka Tournament	Indonesia	0–0	Thailand	Kuala Lumpur, Malaysia
--:-- UTC+7		Report		Stadium: Stadium Merdeka; Referee: M.Kunalan (Singapore)

=== 1989 ===
13 May Friendly	Singapore	1–2	Indonesia	Kallang, Singapore
--:-- UTC+8	Jamaluddin Hassan 89'		Riyadi 1'; Wijaya 48'	Stadium: National Stadium

21 May 1990 FIFA World Cup qualification	Indonesia	0–0	North Korea	Jakarta, Indonesia
--:-- UTC+7				Stadium: Gelora Senayan Stadium; Referee: Murthi (Singapore)

28 May 1990 FIFA World Cup qualification	Indonesia	0–0	Japan	Jakarta, Indonesia
--:-- UTC+7				Stadium: Gelora Senayan Stadium; Attendance: 80,000; Referee: Salah Karim (Iraq)

4 June 1990 FIFA World Cup qualification	Hong Kong	1–1	Indonesia	Hong Kong
--:-- UTC+8	Bredbury 31'		Mustamu 67'	Stadium: Hong Kong Stadium; Attendance: 12,334; Referee: Al-Mulla (United Arab Emirates)

11 June 1990 FIFA World Cup qualification	Japan	5–0	Indonesia	Kita, Tokyo, Japan
--:-- UTC+9	Horiike 5'; Maeda 16'; Shinto 19'; Hasegawa 24'; Kurosaki 69'			Stadium: Nishigaoka National Stadium; Attendance: 9,000; Referee: Buaboocha (Thailand)

25 June 1990 FIFA World Cup qualification	Indonesia	3–2	Hong Kong	Jakarta, Indonesia
--:-- UTC+7	Mustaqim 60'; Kiswanto 74', 89'		Nang Yan Leung 11', 64'	Stadium: Gelora Senayan Stadium; Referee: El-Nasir (Saudi Arabia)

9 July 1990 FIFA World Cup qualification	North Korea	2–1	Indonesia	Pyongyang, North Korea
--:-- UTC+9	Chu Gyong-Sik 40'; Han Hyong-Il 64'		Lolombuman 73'	Stadium: Yanggakdo Stadium; Attendance: 35,000; Referee: Nazari (Iran)

21 August 1989 Sea Games GS	Indonesia	6–0	Brunei	Kuala Lumpur, Malaysia
19:45 UTC+8	Mustaqim 30', 33', 43'; Wijaya 56', 87'; Hartono 58'		Nang Yan Leung 11', 64'	Stadium: Cheras Stadium

23 August 1989 Sea Games GS	Indonesia	5–1	Philippines	Kuala Lumpur, Malaysia
21:30 UTC+8	Wijaya 21'; Hanafing 59', 82'; Yacobi 62'; Mustaqim 73'		Rodolfo Alicante 8'

25 August 1989 Sea Games GS	Malaysia	2–0	Indonesia	Kuala Lumpur, Malaysia
21:30 UTC+8	Lim Teong Kim 39', 52'			Referee: P. Boocherd (Thailand)

28 August 1989 Sea Games SF	Singapore	1–0	Indonesia	Kuala Lumpur, Malaysia
19:45 UTC+8	Fandi 90'	Report		Referee: Wan Rashid Wan Jaffar (Malaysia)

30 August 1989 Sea Games Bronze Medal	Indonesia	1–1 (a.e.t.) (9–8 p)	Thailand	Kuala Lumpur, Malaysia
20:00 UTC+8	Wijaya 60'		Verapong Penglee 74'	Referee: Meij Haji Kamaruddin (Malaysia)

=== 1990 ===
18 August 1990 Independence Cup	Indonesia	6–0	Singapore	Jakarta, Indonesia
	Goal	Report		Stadium: Gelora Senayan Stadium

25 August 1990 Independence Cup Final	Indonesia	0–3	Australia	Jakarta, Indonesia
		Report	Wade 55', 76'; Zinni 63'	Stadium: Gelora Senayan Stadium; Attendance: 18,000; Referee: N Yasunori (Japan)

=== 1991 ===
6 February 1991 Merdeka Tournament	Malaysia	1–2	Indonesia	Kuala Lumpur, Malaysia
--:-- UTC+8	Serbegeth 28'		Mustaqim 11', 14'	Stadium: Stadium Merdeka; Attendance: 15,000; Referee: N Kunalan (Singapore)

5 October Friendly	Singapore	2–0	Indonesia	Kallang, Singapore
--:-- UTC+7	D. Tokijan 68', 88'	Report		Stadium: National Stadium; Attendance: 5,000

26 November 1991 Sea Games GS	Indonesia	2–0	Malaysia	Manila, Philippines
--:-- UTC+8	Widodo 11'; Rochy 22'			Stadium: Rizal Memorial Stadium

28 November 1991 Sea Games GS	Indonesia	1–0	Vietnam	Manila, Philippines
--:-- UTC+8	Darwis 35'			Stadium: Rizal Memorial Stadium

30 November 1991 Sea Games GS	Philippines	1–2	Indonesia	Manila, Philippines
--:-- UTC+8	Rolando Pinero 17'		Hattu 67' (pen.); Rochy 87'	Stadium: Rizal Memorial Stadium; Attendance: 18,000; Referee: S. Kamaruddin (Malaysia)

2 December 1991 Sea Games SF	Indonesia	0–0 (a.e.t.) (4–2 p)	Singapore	Manila, Philippines
--:-- UTC+8				Stadium: Rizal Memorial Stadium; Attendance: 5,000; Referee: B. Chuchai (Thailand)
	Penalties
	Hattu (penalty scored); Suryaman (penalty scored); Heriansyah (penalty scored); Rochy (penalty scored)		(penalty scored) Borhan; (penalty missed) Pathmanathan; (penalty scored) Nasir; (penalty missed) Shukor

4 December 1991 Sea Games Gold Medal	Indonesia	0–0 (a.e.t.) (4–3 p)	Thailand	Manila, Philippines
--:-- UTC+8				Stadium: Rizal Memorial Stadium; Referee: Tin Aung (Myanmar)
	Penalties
	Hattu (penalty scored); Maman (penalty missed); Heriansyah (penalty scored); Ekodono (penalty scored); Widodo (penalty missed); Sudirman (penalty scored)		(penalty scored) Attaphol; (penalty scored) Khungkokekroad; (penalty scored) Kijmongkolsak; (penalty missed) Kunsut; (penalty missed) Ronnachai; (penalty missed) Pairote

=== 1992 ===
20 April 1992 AFC Asian Cup qualification	Indonesia	0–2	China	Kallang, Singapore
--:-- UTC+8		Report	Wu Qunli 24'; Mai Chao 25'	Stadium: National Stadium; Attendance: 15,000; Referee: U Tin Aung (Myanmar)

22 April 1992 AFC Asian Cup qualification	Singapore	1–2	Indonesia	Kallang, Singapore
--:-- UTC+8	Razali Saad 24'	Report	Fakhri 8'; Pitono 85'	Stadium: National Stadium; Attendance: 32,000; Referee: Moritsu Yotaru (Japan)

24 April 1992 AFC Asian Cup qualification	Malaysia	1–1	Indonesia	Kallang, Singapore
--:-- UTC+8	Zainal Abidin Hassan 44'	Report	Fakhri 56'	Stadium: National Stadium; Attendance: 4,000; Referee: Tung Ping Yim (Hongkong)

8 August 1992 Indonesian Independence Cup	Indonesia	1–1	Malaysia	Jakarta, Indonesia
--:-- UTC+7	30'		Zainal Abidin Hassan 20'	Stadium: Gelora Senayan Stadium

14 August 1992 Indonesian Independence Cup	Indonesia	0–3	Australia	Jakarta, Indonesia
--:-- UTC+7			Alistair 20'; Ian Gray 71'; Paul Wade	Stadium: Gelora Senayan Stadium

=== 1993 ===
9 April 1994 FIFA World Cup qualification	Qatar	3–1	Indonesia	Doha, Qatar
--:-- UTC+3	Soufi 51', 79'; Al Kuwari 55'		Pitono 85'

13 April 1994 FIFA World Cup qualification	North Korea	4–0	Indonesia	Doha, Qatar
--:-- UTC+3	Ryu Song-Gun 19'; Choe Yong-Son 42', 58'; Darwis 77' (o.g.)

16 April 1994 FIFA World Cup qualification	Vietnam	1–0	Indonesia	Doha, Qatar
--:-- UTC+3	Hà Vương Ngầu Nại 61'

18 April 1994 FIFA World Cup qualification	Indonesia	0–2	Singapore	Doha, Qatar
--:-- UTC+3			Ali 75'; Sundramoorthy 83'

24 April 1994 FIFA World Cup qualification	Indonesia	1–4	Qatar	Singapore
--:-- UTC+8	Sudirman 28' (pen.)		Khalil Al-Malki 35', 61'; Al Kuwari 75'; Zamel Al Kuwari 83'

28 April 1994 FIFA World Cup qualification	Indonesia	1–2	North Korea	Singapore
--:-- UTC+8	Darmawan 35'		Pang Gwang-Chol 4'; Ryu Song-Gun 68'

30 April 1994 FIFA World Cup qualification	Indonesia	2–1	Vietnam	Singapore
--:-- UTC+8	Putut 55'; Sudirman 75'		Nguyễn Hồng Sơn 30'

2 May 1994 FIFA World Cup qualification	Singapore	2–1	Indonesia	Singapore
--:-- UTC+8	Fandi 70'; V. Sundramoorthy 85'		Saununu 2'

9 June 1993 Sea Games GS	Indonesia	1–0	Vietnam	Kallang, Singapore
21:00 UTC+8	Taufik Y. 51'	Report		Stadium: National Stadium; Attendance: 15,000; Referee: Pirom Un-prasert (Thailand)

11 June 1993 Sea Games GS	Singapore	1–1	Indonesia	Kallang, Singapore
19:00 UTC+8	Sundramoorthy 30'	Report	Herry 2'	Stadium: National Stadium; Attendance: 25,000; Referee: Tamat Budin (Brunei)

15 June 1993 Sea Games GS	Indonesia	3–1	Philippines	Kallang, Singapore
21:00 UTC+8	Sudirman 3'; Darwis 29'; Yacobi 86'	Report	Saluria 11'	Stadium: National Stadium; Attendance: 15,000; Referee: Nasaruddin Shariff (Malaysia)

17 June 1993 Sea Games SF	Thailand	1–0	Indonesia	Kallang, Singapore
21:00 UTC+8	Vitoon 47'			Stadium: National Stadium; Attendance: 15,000; Referee: Nasaruddin Shariff (Malaysia)

19 June 1993 Sea Games Bronze Medal	Singapore	3–1	Indonesia	Kallang, Singapore
19:00 UTC+8	S. Tan 51'; Fandi 58'; Sundramoorthy 89'		Nurdiansyah 5'	Stadium: National Stadium; Attendance: 2,000; Referee: Nasaruddin Shariff (Malaysia)

=== 1995 ===
1 August Friendly	Indonesia	0–0	Singapore	Jakarta, Indonesia
--:-- UTC+7				Stadium: Gelora Senayan Stadium

4 December 1995 Sea Games GS	Thailand	2–1	Indonesia	Chiang Mai, Thailand
--:-- UTC+7	Surachai 30'; Netipong 67'	Report	Fakhri 33'	Stadium: 700th Anniversary Stadium; Attendance: 20,000

6 December 1995 Sea Games GS	Indonesia	10–0	Cambodia	Chiang Mai, Thailand
--:-- UTC+7	Irianto 6' 33' 70' 78'; Kurniawan 12' 60' 83'; Widodo 30'; Tecuari 80'; Indriyanto 86'			Stadium: 700th Anniversary Stadium

8 December 1995 Sea Games GS	Indonesia	3–0	Malaysia	Chiang Mai, Thailand
--:-- UTC+7	Irianto 35'; Fakhri 48', 55'	Report		Stadium: 700th Anniversary Stadium

12 December 1995 Sea Games GS	Vietnam	1–0	Indonesia	Chiang Mai, Thailand
--:-- UTC+7	Nguyen Huu Dang			Stadium: 700th Anniversary Stadium

=== 1996 ===
23 February Friendly	Thailand	4–1	Indonesia	Bangkok, Thailand
--:-- UTC+7	Goal		Goal	Stadium: National Stadium

2 March 1996 AFC Asian Cup qualification	Malaysia	0–0	Indonesia	Kuala Lumpur, Malaysia
--:-- UTC+8				Stadium: Stadium Merdeka

4 March 1996 AFC Asian Cup qualification	Indonesia	7–1	India	Kuala Lumpur, Malaysia
--:-- UTC+8	Indriyanto 12', 74'; Rochy 18', 52'; Ansyari 42', 49'; Sandria 77'		T. Kumar 11'	Stadium: Stadium Merdeka

2 September 1996 AFF Cup GS	Indonesia	5–1	Laos	Jurong, Singapore
--:-- UTC+8	Fakhri 5'; Irianto 15'; Kurniawan 17'; Darwis 34'; Sandria 65'		Savatdy 75'	Stadium: Jurong Stadium; Attendance: 2,800

7 September 1996 AFF Cup GS	Indonesia	3–0	Cambodia	Jurong, Singapore
--:-- UTC+8	Kurniawan 15'; Sandria 23'; Irianto 60'			Stadium: Jurong Stadium; Attendance: 2,000

9 September 1996 AFF Cup GS	Indonesia	6–1	Myanmar	Jurong, Singapore
--:-- UTC+8	Fakhri 7', 66'; Sandria 20', 26'; Ansyari 28'; Irianto 39'		Maung Maung Htay 26'	Stadium: Jurong Stadium; Attendance: 4,000

11 September 1996 AFF Cup GS	Indonesia	1–1	Vietnam	Jurong, Singapore
--:-- UTC+8	Kurniawan 43'		Võ Hoàng Bửu 77' (pen.)	Stadium: Jurong Stadium; Attendance: 1,300

13 September 1996 AFF Cup SF	Indonesia	1–3	Malaysia	Kallang, Singapore
--:-- UTC+8	Azmil 44' (o.g.)		Sanbagamaran 5'; Rusdee 16'; Shamsurin 76'	Stadium: National Stadium; Attendance: 20,000

15 September 1996 AFF Cup Third place	Indonesia	2–3	Vietnam	Kallang, Singapore
--:-- UTC+8	Kurniawan 66'; Tecuari 85'		Huỳnh Quốc Cường 8'; Yeyen 27' (o.g.); Võ Hoàng Bửu 73' (pen.)	Stadium: National Stadium; Attendance: 32,000

30 October Friendly	Moldova	2–1	Indonesia	Genoa, Italy
	Miterev 62' 70'		Sakti 35'	Stadium: La Sciorba Stadium; Attendance: 70

29 November Friendly	Saudi Arabia	4–1	Indonesia	Saudi Arabia
--:-- UTC+3	Goal		Goal

4 December 1996 AFC Asian Cup GS	Indonesia	2–2	Kuwait	Abu Dhabi, United Arab Emirates
18:45 UTC+4	Widodo 20'; Ronny 40'	Report	Al-Saqer 73'; Haji 84' (pen.)	Stadium: Sheikh Zayed Stadium; Attendance: 15,000; Referee: Jamal Al Sharif (Syria)

7 December 1996 AFC Asian Cup GS	South Korea	4–2	Indonesia	Abu Dhabi, United Arab Emirates
19:00 UTC+4	Kim Do-Hoon 5'; Hwang Sun-Hong 7', 15'; Ko Jeong-Woon 55'	Report	Ronny 58'; Widodo 65'	Stadium: Sheikh Zayed Stadium; Attendance: 2,000; Referee: Shamsul Maidin (Singapore)

10 December 1996 AFC Asian Cup GS	United Arab Emirates	2–0	Indonesia	Abu Dhabi, United Arab Emirates
16:45 UTC+4	Saeed 15'; Al-Talyani 64'	Report		Stadium: Sheikh Zayed Stadium; Attendance: 10,000; Referee: Lu Jun (China)

=== 1997 ===
22 February 1997 Dunhill Cup	Indonesia	0–0	Zimbabwe	Kuala Lumpur, Malaysia
--:-- UTC+8		Report		Stadium: Stadium Merdeka

24 February 1997 Dunhill Cup	Indonesia	1–0	Vietnam	Kuala Lumpur, Malaysia
--:-- UTC+8	Widodo 3'	Report		Stadium: Stadium Merdeka

26 February 1997 Dunhill Cup	Indonesia	0–2	Bosnia and Herzegovina	Kuala Lumpur, Malaysia
--:-- UTC+8		Report	Pintul 30' (pen.); Hrnjić 44'	Stadium: Stadium Merdeka; Attendance: 20,000; Referee: Nik Ahmad Yaakub (Malaysia)

9 March Friendly	Saudi Arabia	4–0	Indonesia	Hougang, Singapore
--:-- UTC+8	Goal	Report		Stadium: Hougang Stadium

11 March Friendly	Saudi Arabia	1–1	Indonesia	Hougang, Singapore
--:-- UTC+8	Goal	Report	Goal	Stadium: Hougang Stadium

6 April 1998 FIFA World Cup qualification	Indonesia	6–0	Cambodia	Jakarta, Indonesia
--:-- UTC+7	Widodo 1'; Ansyari 6', 52'; Rochy 12', 44', 70'; Wabia 31', 36'	Report		Stadium: Gelora Senayan Stadium; Attendance: 25,000; Referee: Shamsul Maidin (Singapore)

13 April 1998 FIFA World Cup qualification	Indonesia	0–0	Yemen	Jakarta, Indonesia
--:-- UTC+7		Report		Stadium: Gelora Senayan Stadium; Attendance: 25,000; Referee: Selearajen Subramaniam (Malaysia)

27 April 1998 FIFA World Cup qualification	Cambodia	1–1	Indonesia	Phnom Penh, Cambodia
--:-- UTC+7	Sochetra 65'	Report	Widodo 80'	Stadium: Olympic Stadium; Attendance: 30,000; Referee: Li Haiseng (China)

1 June 1998 FIFA World Cup qualification	Indonesia	1–1	Uzbekistan	Jakarta, Indonesia
--:-- UTC+7	Sudirman 34'	Report	Shatskikh 74'	Stadium: Gelora Senayan Stadium; Attendance: 30,000; Referee: Kim Kwang-Jong (South Korea)

13 June 1998 FIFA World Cup qualification	Yemen	1–1	Indonesia	Sana'a, Yemen
--:-- UTC+3	Al Ariki 33'	Report	Widodo 59'	Stadium: Althawra Sports City Stadium; Attendance: 35,000; Referee: Ali Al Hosni Ali Bin Mubarak (Oman)

20 June 1998 FIFA World Cup qualification	Uzbekistan	3–0	Indonesia	Tashkent, Uzbekistan
--:-- UTC+5	Shatskikh 12'; Maksudov 37', 87'	Report		Stadium: Pakhtakor Markaziy Stadium; Attendance: 55,000; Referee: Jalal Moradi (Iran)

14 September Friendly	Indonesia	3–1	Tanzania	Bandung, Indonesia
--:-- UTC+7	Fakhri 19'; Kurniawan 26', 45'		Lunia Milla 20'	Stadium: Siliwangi Stadium

21 September Friendly	Indonesia	5–0	New Zealand	Surabaya, Indonesia
--:-- UTC+7	Parston 2' (o.g.); Aji 26'; Kurniawan 30', Fakhri	Report		Stadium: Gelora 10 November Stadium; Attendance: 5,000

5 October 1997 Sea Games GS	Indonesia	5–2	Laos	Jakarta, Indonesia
16:00 UTC+7	Darwis 20'; Widodo 44', 68'; Kurniawan 54'; Ansyari 69'	Report	Khenkitisack 61'; Somsack 75'	Stadium: Gelora Senayan Stadium; Attendance: 45,000; Referee: Raja Shrestha (Nepal)

7 October 1997 Sea Games GS	Indonesia	2–2	Vietnam	Jakarta, Indonesia
18:15 UTC+7	Bima 35'; Kurniawan 65'		Văn Sỹ Hùng 58', 87'	Stadium: Gelora Senayan Stadium; Referee: Santan Nagalingam (Singapore)

9 October 1997 Sea Games GS	Indonesia	4–0	Malaysia	Jakarta, Indonesia
16:00 UTC+7	Fakhri 20' (pen.), 52' (pen.); Widodo 60'; Kurniawan 69'	Report (Malay)		Stadium: Gelora Senayan Stadium; Referee: Yu Jinyin (China)

12 October 1997 Sea Games GS	Indonesia	2–0	Philippines	Jakarta, Indonesia
18:15 UTC+7	Uston 25'; Kurniawan 70'			Stadium: Gelora Senayan Stadium; Referee: Thein U Thein (Myanmar)

16 October 1997 Sea Games SF	Indonesia	2–1	Singapore	Jakarta, Indonesia
18:30 UTC+7	Bima 11'; Fakhri 57'		Fandi 58'	Stadium: Gelora Senayan Stadium; Attendance: 120,000; Referee: Yu Jinyin (China)

18 October 1997 Sea Games Gold Medal	Indonesia	1–1 (a.e.t.) (2–4 p)	Thailand	Jakarta, Indonesia
18:30 UTC+7	Kurniawan 48'		Chaichan 30'	Stadium: Gelora Senayan Stadium; Attendance: 110,000; Referee: Yu Jin Yin (China)
	Penalties
	Aji (penalty scored); Fakhri (penalty scored); Wabia (penalty missed); Uston (penalty missed)		(penalty scored) Senamuang; (penalty scored) Piandit; (penalty scored) Sripan; (penalty scored) Chalermsan

=== 1998 ===
27 August 1998 AFF Cup GS	Indonesia	3–0	Philippines	Ho Chi Minh City, Vietnam
18:15 UTC+7	Widodo 15'; Bima 42' (pen.); Uston 65'			Stadium: Thống Nhất Stadium; Attendance: 15,000; Referee: Shamsul Maidin (Singapore)

29 August 1998 AFF Cup GS	Indonesia	6–2	Myanmar	Ho Chi Minh City, Vietnam
20:45 UTC+7	Aji 15' (pen.); Widodo 30'; Min Aung 39' (o.g.); Bima 54'; Miro 75' (pen.); Min Thu 77' (o.g.)			Stadium: Thống Nhất Stadium; Attendance: 15,000; Referee: Nguyễn Văn Mùi (Vietnam)

31 August 1998 AFF Cup GS	Thailand	3–2	Indonesia	Ho Chi Minh City, Vietnam
20:45 UTC+7	Kritsada 62'; Therdsak 86'; Mursyid 90' (o.g.)		Miro 52'; Aji 84'	Stadium: Thống Nhất Stadium; Attendance: 5,000; Referee: Lu Jun (China)

3 September 1998 AFF Cup SF	Singapore	2–1	Indonesia	Ho Chi Minh City, Vietnam
20:00 UTC+7	Rafi 12'; Nazri 30'		Miro 34'	Stadium: Thống Nhất Stadium; Attendance: 7,000; Referee: Lu Jun (China)

5 September 1998 AFF Cup Third place	Indonesia	3–3 (a.e.t.) (5–4 p)	Thailand	Ho Chi Minh City, Vietnam
16:00 UTC+7	Kurniawan 16'; Aji 33'; Ekodono 89'		Chaichan 18'; Worrawoot 42'; Kowit 44'	Stadium: Thống Nhất Stadium; Attendance: 5,000
	Penalties
	Uston (penalty scored); Bima (penalty scored); Ekodono (penalty scored); Kuncoro (penalty scored); Imam (penalty scored)		(penalty scored) Promrut; (penalty missed) Punsanai; (penalty scored) Songserm; (penalty scored) Therdsak; (penalty scored) Kritsada

=== 1999 ===
2 July Friendly	Indonesia	2–2	Lithuania	Valga, Estonia
--:-- UTC+3	Bambang	Report	Goal	Stadium: Valga Keskstaadion

6 July Friendly	Estonia	0–0	Indonesia	Hiiumaa, Estonia
--:-- UTC+3				Stadium: Emmaste

31 July 1999 Sea Games GS	Indonesia	1–0	Cambodia	Bandar Seri Begawan, Brunei
16:00 UTC+8	Mardiansyah 90'	Report		Stadium: Berakas Track and Field Complex; Attendance: 2,000; Referee: Nguyen Van Mui (Vietnam)

2 August 1999 Sea Games GS	Indonesia	6–0	Malaysia	Bandar Seri Begawan, Brunei
16:00 UTC+8	Prasetyo 6'; Rochy 9', 84'; Bambang 51', 58'; Sunan 82'	Report		Stadium: Berakas Track and Field Complex; Attendance: 2,000; Referee: Permpanich Pongsathorn (Thailand)

6 August 1999 Sea Games GS	Indonesia	1–1	Singapore	Bandar Seri Begawan, Brunei
16:00 UTC+8	Bima 37' (pen.)	Report	Indra 89'	Stadium: Berakas Track and Field Complex; Attendance: 2,000; Referee: Permpanich Pongsathorn (Thailand)

9 August 1999 Sea Games GS	Brunei	0–3	Indonesia	Bandar Seri Begawan, Brunei
20:00 UTC+8		Report	Uston 4'; Bima 39' (pen.); Mardiansyah 87'	Stadium: Berakas Track and Field Complex; Attendance: 3,000; Referee: Mohammad Kadri (Malaysia)

12 August 1999 Sea Games SF	Indonesia	0–1	Vietnam	Bandar Seri Begawan, Brunei
20:00 UTC+8		Report	Nguyen Hong Son 70'	Stadium: Hassanal Bolkiah Stadium; Attendance: 3,000; Referee: Sun Bao Jie (China)

14 August 1999 Sea Games Bronze Medal	Indonesia	0–0 (a.e.t.) (4–2 p)	Singapore	Bandar Seri Begawan, Brunei
16:00 UTC+8		Report		Stadium: Hassanal Bolkiah Stadium; Attendance: 3,000; Referee: Sun Bao Jie (China)
	Penalties
	Bima (penalty scored); Prasetyo (penalty scored); Sugiantoro (penalty scored); Widodo (penalty scored)		(penalty scored) Zulkarnaen; (penalty missed) Nazri; (penalty missed) Mohd Rafi Ali; (penalty scored) Salleh

18 October 2000 AFC Asian Cup qualification	Hong Kong	1–1	Indonesia	Kowloon, Hong Kong
--:-- UTC+8	Au Wai Lun 62'		Rochy 88'	Stadium: Mongkok Stadium

30 October 2000 AFC Asian Cup qualification	Cambodia	1–5	Indonesia	Phnom Penh, Cambodia
--:-- UTC+7	Arunreath 72'		Prasetyo 14'; Bambang 28'; Rochy 39', 46'; Sunan 47'	Stadium: Olympic Stadium

14 November 2000 AFC Asian Cup qualification	Indonesia	3–1	Hong Kong	Jakarta, Indonesia
--:-- UTC+7	Mar'uf 9'; Rochy 48'; Bambang 72'		Au Wai Lun 62'	Stadium: Gelora Senayan Stadium

20 November 2000 AFC Asian Cup qualification	Indonesia	9–2	Cambodia	Jakarta, Indonesia
--:-- UTC+7	Rochy 2', 38', 90'; Purdjianto 15'; Nahumarury 33'; Uston 40'; Bambang 53', 70'; Widodo 85'		Sochetra 13', 58'	Stadium: Gelora Senayan Stadium
