= Football at the 1991 SEA Games – Men's team squads =

Below are the squads for the Football at the 1991 SEA Games, hosted by Thailand, which took place between 25 November and 4 December 1991.

== Group A ==
=== Singapore ===
Coach: Robin Chan

No.	Pos.	Player	Date of birth (age)	Club
	GK	David Lee	10 April 1958 (aged 33)	(Football Association of Singapore) Singapore FA
	GK	Abdul Malek Mohamed		(Football Association of Singapore)
	DF	Borhan Abdullah	20 January 1965 (aged 26)	(Football Association of Singapore)
	DF	T. Pathmanathan	9 February 1956 (aged 35)	(Football Association of Singapore) Singapore FA
	DF	Tong Hai Lim	14 May 1969 (aged 22)	(Football Association of Singapore) Geylang International FC
	DF	Borhan Abu Samah	30 November 1964 (aged 26)	
	DF	Zulkifli Kartoyoho	21 April 1964 (aged 27)	
	DF	Ishak Saad		
	DF	Sudiat Dali	20 February 1962 (aged 29)	(Football Association of Singapore) Singapore FA
	MF	Malek Awab	11 January 1961 (aged 30)	(Football Association of Singapore) Singapore FA
	MF	D. Tokijan	14 February 1963 (aged 28)	(Football Association of Singapore) Jurong FC
	MF	Hasnim Haron	21 December 1966 (aged 24)	(Football Association of Singapore) Singapore FA
	MF	Mohd Saadi Sukor		
	MF	Nazri Nasir	17 January 1971 (aged 20)	(Football Association of Singapore) Balestier United
	MF	Saad Razali		
	MF	V. Selvaraj	12 February 1969 (aged 22)	(Football Association of Singapore) SAFFC
	FW	Fandi Ahmad	29 May 1962 (aged 29)	(Football Association of Malaysia) Pahang FA
	FW	V. Sundramoorthy	6 October 1965 (aged 26)	(Football Association of Malaysia) Pahang FA
	FW	Abdullah Noor	5 June 1961 (aged 30)	

=== Thailand ===
Coach: (Brazil) Carlos Roberto

No.	Pos.	Player	Date of birth (age)	Club
	GK	Chaiyong Khumpiam	29 August 1965 (aged 26)	(Football Association of Thailand) Police Sports Club
	GK	Vilard Normcharoen	14 July 1962 (aged 29)	
	DF	Sumet Akarapong	6 July 1971 (aged 20)	
	DF	Sutin Chaikitti	15 July 1956 (aged 35)	(Football Association of Thailand) Rajpracha F.C.
	DF	Surak Chaikitti	1 October 1958 (aged 33)	
	DF	Anun Punsan		
	DF	Suksun Kunsut		
	DF	Surachai Jaturapattarapong	20 November 1969 (aged 22)	(Football Association of Thailand) Thai Farmers Bank FC
	MF	Attaphol Buspakom	1 October 1965 (aged 26)	(Football Association of Thailand) Thai Port
	MF	Natee Thongsookkaew	9 December 1966 (aged 24)	(Football Association of Thailand) Police Sports Club
	MF	Vorawan Chitavanich	28 May 1961 (aged 30)	(Football Association of Thailand) Rajpracha F.C.
	MF	Charin Palsiri	7 April 1966 (aged 25)	
	MF	Pairote Pongjan	16 December 1966 (aged 24)	(Football Association of Thailand) Royal Thai Air Force
	MF	Kosol Jantrachart	26 December 1966 (aged 24)	
	MF	Poomeat Hungsuwanakool		
	MF	Praphan Khungkokekroad		
	FW	Vitoon Kijmongkolsak	21 July 1962 (aged 29)	(Football Association of Malaysia) Penang FA
	FW	Ronnachai Sayomchai	14 September 1966 (aged 25)	(Football Association of Thailand) Thai Port
	FW	Worrawoot Srimaka	8 December 1971 (aged 19)	(Football Association of Thailand) Thai Farmers Bank FC
	FW	Surasak Tungsurat	1 January 1965 (aged 26)	(Football Association of Thailand) Rajnavy

=== Myanmar ===
Coach: Maung Maung Tin

No.	Pos.	Player	Date of birth (age)	Caps	Club
	GK	Aing Kyaw Kyaw			(Myanmar)
	DF	Zaw Tin			(Myanmar)
		Naing Soe			(Myanmar)
	DF	Zaw Naing			(Singapore) Tyrwhitt Soccerites
		Win Aung			(Singapore) Tyrwhitt Soccerites
		Kyaw Soe Moe			(Myanmar)
		Oo Tun Tun			(Myanmar)
		Tun Ting			(Myanmar)
	MF	Than Toe Aung			Malaysia Armed Forces F.C.
	MF	Myo Hlaing Win	24 May 1973 (aged 18)		Malaysia Armed Forces F.C.
	FW	Aung Naing			(Malaysia) Perak FA
	FW	Kyi Lwin			(Malaysia) Perak FA

== Group B ==
=== Vietnam ===
Coach: Nguyễn Sỹ Hiển

No.	Pos.	Player	Date of birth (age)	Caps	Club
13	GK	Nguyễn Hồng Phẩm	1964		(Vietnam) Cảng Sài Gòn
11		Lư Đình Tuấn	17 August 1968 (aged 23)		(Vietnam) Cảng Sài Gòn
8		Do Van Minh	1965		(Vietnam) Cảng Sài Gòn
12		Pham Tien Dung			(Vietnam)
14		Nguyen Quoc An			(Vietnam)
18		Vo Ngoc Quy			(Vietnam)
9	MF	Đinh Thế Nam	30 April 1965 (aged 26)		(Vietnam)
4		Doan Ngoc Tuan			(Vietnam)
16		La Xuan Thang			(Vietnam)
15	MF	Lưu Tấn Liêm	14 October 1959 (aged 32)		(Vietnam) Hải Quan
3	DF	Quan Trong Hung	1956		(Vietnam) Thể Công
5		Chu Van Mui	1967		(Vietnam)
2		Nguyễn Mạnh Cường	5 August 1965 (aged 26)		(Vietnam)
17		Nguyen Chau Hong	1960		(Vietnam)
1	GK	Tran Xuan Ly			(Vietnam)
6	DF	Le Khac Chinh	14 November 1956 (aged 35)		(Vietnam) Tổng Cục Đường Sắt
7	FW	Nguyễn Văn Dũng	23 December 1963 (aged 27)		(Vietnam) Hà Nam Ninh
10	FW	Hà Vương Ngầu Nại	26 November 1964 (aged 26)		(Vietnam) Cảng Sài Gòn

=== Malaysia ===
Coach: (Malaysia) Rahim Abdullah

No.	Pos.	Player	Date of birth (age)	Club
	GK	Hassan Miskam	17 July 1954 (aged 37)	(Football Association of Malaysia) Selangor FA
	DF	Raja Azlan Shah	10 November 1968 (aged 23)	(Football Association of Malaysia) Perak FA
	DF	Karupiah Gunalan	13 December 1965 (aged 25)	(Football Association of Malaysia) Selangor FA
	DF	Maniam Pachaiappan	6 October 1968 (aged 23)	(Football Association of Malaysia) Selangor FA
	DF	Salahuddin Che Ros		(Football Association of Malaysia) Penang FA
	DF	Zamri Mohammad Noor		(Football Association of Malaysia) Terengganu FA
	MF	Yap Wai Loon	22 December 1969 (aged 21)	(Football Association of Malaysia) Kuala Lumpur FA
	MF	Arumugam Jayakanthan	20 September 1966 (aged 25)	(Football Association of Malaysia) Selangor FA
	MF	Roefandi Yusuf		(Football Association of Malaysia) Perak FA
	MF	Nidzam Adzha	11 March 1968 (aged 23)	(Football Association of Malaysia) Perlis FA
	MF	Zaidi Nafiah		(Football Association of Malaysia) Perak FA
	MF	Azizol Abu Haniffah	18 February 1960 (aged 31)	(Football Association of Malaysia) Perak FA
	FW	Salehan Mohammad Som		(Football Association of Malaysia) Johor FA
	FW	Azman Adnan	1 November 1971 (aged 20)	(Football Association of Malaysia) Kuala Lumpur FA
	FW	Matlan Marjan	18 October 1968 (aged 23)	(Football Association of Malaysia) Sabah FA

=== Indonesia ===
Coach: (Russia) Anatoli Polosin

No.	Pos.	Player	Date of birth (age)	Club
1	GK	Eddy Harto	12 June 1961 (aged 30)	(Football Association of Indonesia) KTB Palembang
3	DF	Aji Santoso	6 April 1970 (aged 21)	(Football Association of Indonesia) Arema Malang
4	DF	Herrie Setyawan	8 March 1969 (aged 22)	(Football Association of Indonesia) Pelita Jaya
5	DF	Sudirman	24 April 1969 (aged 22)	(Football Association of Indonesia) Arseto Solo
6	DF	Robby Darwis	30 October 1964 (aged 27)	(Football Association of Indonesia) Persib Bandung
7	FW	Widodo C Putro	8 April 1970 (aged 21)	(Football Association of Indonesia) Warna Agung
9	FW	Rochy Putiray	26 June 1970 (aged 21)	(Football Association of Indonesia) Arseto Solo
10	FW	Peri Sandria	24 September 1969 (aged 22)	(Football Association of Indonesia) KTB Palembang
12	MF	Maman Suryaman	15 January 1964 (aged 27)	(Football Association of Indonesia) Pelita Jaya
15	DF	Toyo Haryono		(Football Association of Indonesia) KTB Palembang
16	DF	Ferril Raymond Hattu	9 August 1962 (aged 29)	(Football Association of Indonesia) Petrokimia Gresik
17	MF	Yusuf Ekodono	16 April 1967 (aged 24)	(Football Association of Indonesia) Persebaya Surabaya
20	GK	Erick Ibrahim		(Football Association of Indonesia) Gelora Dewata
	DF	Salahudin	30 January 1970 (aged 21)	(Football Association of Indonesia) Barito Putera
	MF	Heriansyah		(Football Association of Indonesia)
	MF	Kas Hartadi	16 December 1970 (aged 20)	(Football Association of Indonesia) KTB Palembang
	MF	Hanafing	20 June 1963 (aged 28)	(Football Association of Indonesia)
	FW	Bambang Nurdiansyah	28 December 1960 (aged 30)	(Football Association of Indonesia) Pelita Jaya

=== Philippines ===
Coach: (Germany) Eckhard Krautzun

No.	Pos.	Player	Date of birth (age)	Caps	Club
1	GK	Melo Sabacan	5 October 1969 (aged 22)		(Philippines) Bacolod
	GK	Nonoy Carpio			(Philippines)
	DF	Rodolfo Alicante	21 January 1960 (aged 31)		(Philippines)
	DF	Judy Saluria	11 November 1970 (aged 21)		(Philippines) Philippine Army F.C.
	DF	Marlon Maro			(Philippines) Dumaguete
	DF	Jess Baron			(Philippines)
	DF	Edgar Berja			(Philippines) Philippine Air Force F.C.
	DF	Rolando Piñero	23 November 1969 (aged 22)		(Philippines) Dumaguete
	DF	Juan de la Cruz			(Philippines)
	DF	Herbert Ignacio			(Philippines) Dumaguete
	MF	Alfredo Dioso Jr.			(Philippines) Bacolod
	MF	Eduardo Duran			(Philippines) Dumaguete
	MF	Eduardo Marasigan Jr.			(Philippines) Acer Davao
	MF	Hersey Salmon			(Philippines)
	FW	Rudy del Rosario			(Philippines)
	FW	Filamer Rosell			(Philippines)
	FW	Elmer Bedia			(Philippines) Brisbane Olympic United
	FW	Norman Fegidero	28 January 1970 (aged 21)		(Philippines) Bacolod
