= Football at the 1993 SEA Games =

1993 SEA Games Men's Football
Tournament details
- Host country: Singapore
- Dates: 7–20 June
- Teams: 9
- Venue: 2

Final positions
- Champions: Thailand (6th title)
- Runners-up: Myanmar
- Third place: Singapore
- Fourth place: Indonesia

Tournament statistics
- Matches played: 20
- Goals scored: 86 (4.3 per match)
- Attendance: 237,000 (11,850 per match)

The football tournament at the 1993 SEA Games was held from 7 to 19 June 1993 in Singapore.

== Teams ==
- Brunei
- Indonesia
- Laos
- Malaysia
- Myanmar
- Philippines
- Singapore
- Thailand
- Vietnam

== Squad ==
Football at the 1993 SEA Games – Men's team squads

== Venues ==
National Stadium	Jurong Stadium
Capacity: 50,000	Capacity: 8,000

== Group stage ==
=== Group A ===
Team	Pld	W	D	L	GF	GA	GD	Pts
Singapore	3	2	1	0	10	1	+9	5
Indonesia	3	2	1	0	5	2	+3	5
Vietnam	3	1	0	2	1	3	−2	2
Philippines	3	0	0	3	1	11	−10	0

9 June 1993
19.00

Singapore	7–0	Philippines
Steven Tan 21' (pen.); Fandi 33', 48', 76'; Malek 41'; Rafi 52'; Sundramoorthy 63'	Report

National Stadium
Attendance: 21,000
Referee: Nasaruddin Shariff (Malaysia)
9 June 1993
21.00

Indonesia	1–0	Vietnam
Taufik 51'	Report

National Stadium
Attendance: 15,000
Referee: Pirom Un-prasert (Thailand)

11 June 1993
19.00

Singapore	1–1	Indonesia
Sundramoorthy 30'	Report	Herry 2'

National Stadium
Attendance: 25,000
Referee: Tamat Budin (Brunei)
11 June 1993
21.00

Vietnam	1–0	Philippines
Nguyễn Văn Long 66'	Report

National Stadium
Attendance: 6,000
Referee: Soe Thein (Myanmar)

15 June 1993
19.00

Singapore	2–0	Vietnam
Malek 18'; Sundramoorthy 57'	Report

National Stadium
Attendance: 20,000
Referee: Pirom Un-prasert (Thailand)
15 June 1993
21.00

Indonesia	3–1	Philippines
Sudirman 3'; Robby 29'; Ricky 86'	Report	Saluria 11'

National Stadium
Attendance: 15,000
Referee: Nasaruddin Shariff (Malaysia)

=== Group B ===
Team	Pld	W	D	L	GF	GA	GD	Pts
Thailand	4	4	0	0	13	3	+9	8
Myanmar	4	3	0	1	15	4	+11	6
Malaysia	4	2	0	2	13	5	+8	4
Laos	4	1	0	3	3	20	−17	2
Brunei	4	0	0	4	3	15	−12	0

7 June 1993
19.00

Thailand	2–0	Myanmar
Piyapong 49'; Kiatisuk 74'	Report

National Stadium
Attendance: 5,000
Referee: T. Rajamanickam (Singapore)
7 June 1993
21.00

Laos	3–2	Brunei
Bounlap 3', 71'; Savatdy 75'		Said 85'; Zaini 87'

National Stadium
Attendance: 6,000
Referee: Jimmy Somogod (Philippines)

9 June 1993
19.00

Malaysia	3–1	Brunei
Zainal Abidin 54'; Dollah 87'; Gunanlan 89'		Said 66'

Jurong Stadium
Attendance: 1,000
Referee: T. Rajamanickam (Singapore)
9 June 1993
21.00

Myanmar	7–1	Laos
Ye Htut 34'; Than Toe Aung 36', 55', 64'; Myo Hlaing Win 48', 56', 75'		Bounlap 88'

Jurong Stadium
Attendance: 1,000
Referee: I Made Sudra (Indonesia)

11 June 1993
19.00

Malaysia	9–0	Laos
Dollah 3', 7', 9', 53', 84'; Zainal Abidin 16'; Ahmad 60', 77'; Mubin 80'	Report (Malay)

Jurong Stadium
Attendance: 1,500
Referee: Jimmy Somogod (Philippines)
11 June 1993
21.00

Thailand	5–2	Brunei
Pongtorn 20', 88'; Attaphol 13', 65'; Piyapong 50'		Momin 8'; Rosanan 41'

Jurong Stadium
Attendance: 1,500
Referee: I Made Sudra (Indonesia)

13 June 1993
19.00

Myanmar	2–1	Malaysia
Myo Hlaing Win 1'; Than Toe Aung 44'	Report (Malay)	Azizol 4'

National Stadium
Attendance: 10,000
Referee: I Made Sudra (Indonesia)
13 June 1993
21.00

Thailand	4–1	Laos
Piyapong 35', 71'; Kiatisuk 51'; Vitoon 83'		Savatdy 70'

National Stadium
Attendance: 10,000
Referee: T. Rajamanickam (Singapore)

15 June 1993
19.00

Myanmar	6–0	Brunei
Kyi Lwin 25'; Win Aung 31', 48'; Myo Hlaing Win 59', 89'; Than Toe Aung 64'	Report (Malay)

Jurong Stadium
Attendance: 5,000
Referee: Jimmy Somogod (Philippines)
15 June 1993
21.00

Thailand	2–0	Malaysia
Vitoon 16' (pen.); Pongtorn 68'	Report (Malay)

Jurong Stadium
Attendance: 7,000
Referee: Tamat Budin (Brunei)

== Knockout stage ==
Semi-finals
17 June
Singapore	3 (4)
Myanmar (pen.)	3 (5)
17 June
Thailand	1
Indonesia	0

Final
20 June
Thailand	4
Myanmar	3
Third place
19 June
Singapore	3
Indonesia	1

=== Semi-finals ===
17 June 1993
19.00

Singapore	3–3 (a.e.t.)	Myanmar
Steven Tan 5', 53'; Fandi 23'		Lim Tong Hai 7' (o.g.), 50' (o.g.); Win Aung 90+5'
Penalties
Steven Tan (penalty scored); Rafi (penalty scored); Faruk (penalty scored); Nazri (penalty scored); Razali (penalty missed)	4–5	(penalty scored) Tin Myint Aung; (penalty scored) Ye Htut; (penalty scored) Tin Htwe; (penalty scored) Than Toe Aung; (penalty scored) Saw Ba Myint

National Stadium
Attendance: 40,000
Referee: Tamat Budin (Brunei)

17 June 1993
21.00

Thailand	1–0	Indonesia
Vitoon 47'

National Stadium
Attendance: 15,000
Referee: Nasaruddin Shariff (Malaysia)

=== Bronze medal match ===
19 June 1993
19.00

Singapore	3–1	Indonesia
Steven Tan 51'; Fandi 58'; Sundramoorthy 89'		Bambang 5'

National Stadium
Attendance: 2,000
Referee: Nasaruddin Shariff (Malaysia)

=== Gold medal match ===
20 June 1993
17.00

Thailand	4–3	Myanmar
Vitoon 6', 50'; Piyapong 9'; Kiatisuk 87'		Myo Hlaing Win 4', 59'; Kyi Lwin 49'

National Stadium
Attendance: 30,000
Referee: T. Rajamanickam (Singapore)

== Winners ==
1993 SEA Games Men's Tournament

Thailand
Sixth title

== Final ranking ==
Pos	Team	Pld	W	D	L	GF	GA	GD	Pts	Final result
1	Thailand	6	6	0	0	18	6	+12	12	Gold Medal
2	Myanmar	6	3	1	2	21	11	+10	7	Silver Medal
3	Singapore (H)	5	3	2	0	16	5	+11	8	Bronze Medal
4	Indonesia	5	2	1	2	6	6	0	5	Fourth place
5	Malaysia	4	2	0	2	13	5	+8	4	Eliminated in group stage
6	Vietnam	3	1	0	2	1	3	−2	2	Eliminated in group stage
7	Laos	4	1	0	3	3	20	−17	2	Eliminated in group stage
8	Philippines	3	0	0	3	1	11	−10	0	Eliminated in group stage
9	Brunei	4	0	0	4	3	15	−12	0	Eliminated in group stage

(H) Hosts

== Medal winners ==
Gold	Silver	Bronze
Thailand	Myanmar	Singapore
GK Wacharapong Somchit; DF Sumet Akarapong; MF Apichad Thaveechalermdit; Phathanapong Sripramote; DF Pairote Pongjan; Sirisak Kadalee; Natee Thongsookkaew; Attaphol Buspakom; Piyapong Pue-on; Pongtorn Thiubthong; Songserm Maperm; Surachai Jaturapattarapong; Kiatisuk Senamuang; Vitoon Kijmongkolsak; Surasak Tungsurat; Tawan Sripan; Iungphet Charoenvong; Saravouth Cambua; Sompong Watana; FW Chalor Hongkajohn; Songwuti Khanthatat; Thaweerat Sittipultong	Zaw Win Naing; Tun Myint Lwin; Ngwe Tun; Tin Maung Tun; Kyi Lwin; Myo Hlaing Win; Win Aung; Than Toe Aung; Moe Kyaw; Saw Ba Myint; Min Zaw Oo; Kyaw Min; Myint Ko; Tin Htwe; Tin Myint Aung; Sai Maung Maung Oo; Ye Htut; Aung Kyaw Kyaw	V. Sundramoorthy; K. Tamil Marren; Ahmad Ibrahim; Yahya Madon; Stephen Ng; Razali Rashid; Abdul Malek Mohammad; Borhan Abu Samah; Fandi Ahmad; Lee Man Hon; Lim Tong Hai; Malek Awab; E. Manimohan; Nazri Nasir; Rafi Ali; Nodin Abdul Khalil; Amin Nasir; Bashir Khan; Saswadimata Dasuki; Steven Tan; Kadir Yahaya; Faruk Alkaff; Razali Saad
