= Football at the 1991 SEA Games =

1991 SEA Games Football
Tournament details
- Host country: Philippines
- City: Manila
- Dates: 25 November – 4 December
- Teams: 7
- Venue: Rizal Memorial Stadium

Final positions
- Champions: Indonesia (2nd title)
- Runners-up: Thailand
- Third place: Singapore
- Fourth place: Philippines

Tournament statistics
- Matches played: 13
- Goals scored: 31 (2.38 per match)

The football tournament at the 1991 SEA Games was held from 25 November to 4 December 1991 in Manila, Philippines.

== Teams ==
- Indonesia
- Malaysia
- Myanmar
- Philippines
- Singapore
- Thailand
- Vietnam

== Venues ==
Manila	Rizal Memorial Stadium	Capacity: 12,873	Rizal Memorial Stadium

== Squad ==
Football at the 1991 SEA Games – Men's team squads

== Group stage ==
=== Group A ===
Team	Pld	W	D	L	GF	GA	GD	Pts
Thailand	2	1	1	0	4	0	+4	3
Singapore	2	1	1	0	2	1	+1	3
Myanmar	2	0	0	2	1	6	−5	0

25 November 1991

Singapore	0–0	Thailand

Rizal Memorial Stadium, Manila
Referee: Mondia Montano (Philippines)

27 November 1991

Thailand	4–0	Myanmar

Rizal Memorial Stadium, Manila

29 November 1991

Singapore	2–1	Myanmar
Fandi 46', 63'		Aung Than Toe 61'

Rizal Memorial Stadium, Manila
Attendance: 5,000

=== Group B ===
Team	Pld	W	D	L	GF	GA	GD	Pts
Indonesia	3	3	0	0	5	1	+4	6
Philippines (H)	3	1	1	1	4	4	0	3
Malaysia	3	1	0	2	2	4	−2	2
Vietnam	3	0	1	2	3	5	−2	1

(H) Hosts
26 November 1991

Indonesia	2–0	Malaysia
Putro 11'; Putiray 22'

Rizal Memorial Stadium, Manila
26 November 1991

Philippines	2–2	Vietnam
N. Fegidero (?); P. Rosell (?)		Nguyễn Văn Dũng (?)

Rizal Memorial Stadium, Manila

28 November 1991

Indonesia	1–0	Vietnam
Darwis 35'

Rizal Memorial Stadium, Manila
28 November 1991

Philippines	1–0	Malaysia
Fegidero 84'

Rizal Memorial Stadium, Manila

30 November 1991

Philippines	1–2	Indonesia
R. Piñero 17'		Hattu 67' (pen.); Putiray 87'

Rizal Memorial Stadium, Manila
Attendance: 18.000
Referee: S. Kamaruddin (Malaysia)

30 November 1991

Malaysia	2–1	Vietnam
Adnan 24', 69'	Report (Malay)	Nguyễn Văn Dũng 60'

Rizal Memorial Stadium, Manila

== Knockout stages ==
Semi-finals
2 December
Thailand	6
Philippines	2
2 December
Indonesia (pen.)	0 (4)
Singapore	0 (2)

Final
4 December
Thailand	0 (3)
Indonesia (pen.)	0 (4)
Third place
4 December
Philippines	0
Singapore	2

=== Semi-finals ===
2 December 1991

Thailand	6–2	Philippines
Ronnachai 8', 18', 26', 36'; Vitoon 61'; Attaphol 77'		Bedia 45'; Fillamer 89'

Rizal Memorial Stadium, Manila
2 December 1991

Indonesia	0–0 (a.e.t.)	Singapore
Penalties
Hattu (penalty scored); Suryaman (penalty scored); Heriansyah (penalty scored); Rochy Putiray (penalty scored)	4–2 (Note: RSSSF reports the penalty shootout as 4–2 to Indonesia. The ASEAN Football Federation reports it as 4–3 to Indonesia.)	(penalty scored) Borhan; (penalty missed) Pathmanathan; (penalty scored) Nasir; (penalty missed) Shukor

Rizal Memorial Stadium, Manila
Attendance: 5,000
Referee: B. Chuchai (Thailand)

=== Bronze medal match ===
4 December 1991

Philippines	0–2	Singapore
		Abdullah Noor 29'; Nasir 45+1'

Rizal Memorial Stadium, Manila
Referee: Zulkifli S. (Indonesia)

=== Gold medal match ===
4 December 1991

Indonesia	0–0 (a.e.t.)	Thailand
Penalties
Hattu (penalty scored); Suryaman (penalty missed); Heriansyah (penalty scored); Ekodono (penalty scored); Putro (penalty missed); Sudirman (penalty scored)	4–3	(penalty scored) Attaphol; (penalty scored) Praphan; (penalty scored) Vitoon; (penalty missed) Suksun; (penalty missed) Ronnachai; (penalty missed) Pairote

Rizal Memorial Stadium, Manila
Referee: Tin Aung (Myanmar)

== Winners ==
1991 SEA Games Men's Tournament

Indonesia
Second title

== Final ranking ==
Pos	Team	Pld	W	D	L	GF	GA	GD	Pts	Final result
1	Indonesia	5	3	2	0	5	1	+4	8	Gold Medal
2	Thailand	4	2	2	0	10	2	+8	6	Silver Medal
3	Singapore	4	2	2	0	4	1	+3	6	Bronze Medal
4	Philippines (H)	5	1	1	3	6	12	−6	3	Fourth place
5	Malaysia	3	1	0	2	2	4	−2	2	Eliminated in group stage
6	Vietnam	3	0	1	2	3	5	−2	1	Eliminated in group stage
7	Myanmar	2	0	0	2	1	6	−5	0	Eliminated in group stage

(H) Hosts

== Medalists ==
Gold	Silver	Bronze
Indonesia	Thailand	Singapore
GK Eddy Harto; GK Erick Ibrahim; DF Ferril Hattu; DF Herrie Setyawan; DF Robby Darwis; DF Aji Santoso; DF Salahudin; DF Sudirman; DF Toyo Haryono; MF Maman Suryaman; MF Heriansyah; MF Kas Hartadi; MF Yusuf Ekodono; FW Widodo Putro; FW Peri Sandria; FW Rochy Putiray; FW Bambang Nurdiansyah; FW Hanafing; Coach: Anatoli Polosin	GK Chaiyong Khumpiam; GK Wilat Nomjaroen; DF Sumet Akarapong; DF Sutin Chaikitti; DF Surak Chaikitti; DF Anun Punsan; DF Suksun Kunsut; DF Surachai Jaturapattarapong; DF Attaphol Buspakom; MF Natee Thongsookkaew; MF Vorawan Chitavanich; MF Charin Palsiri; MF Pairote Pongjan; MF Kosol Jantrachart; MF Poomeat Hungsuwanakool; MF Praphan Khungkokekroad; FW Vitoon Kijmongkolsak; FW Ronnachai Sayomchai; FW Worrawoot Srimaka; FW Surasak Tungsurat; Coach: Carlos Roberto	GK David Lee; GK Abdul Malek Mohamed; DF Borhan Abdullah; DF T. Pathmanathan; DF Borhan Abu Samah; DF Zulkifli Kartoyoho; DF Ishak Saad; DF Sudiat Dali; MF Malek Awab; MF D. Tokijan; MF Hasnim Haron; MF Mohd Saadi Sukor; MF Nazri Nasir; MF Saad Razali; MF V. Selvaraj; FW Fandi Ahmad; FW V. Sundramoorthy; FW Abdullah Noor; Coach: Robin Chan
