= Robby Darwis =

Indonesian footballer and coach

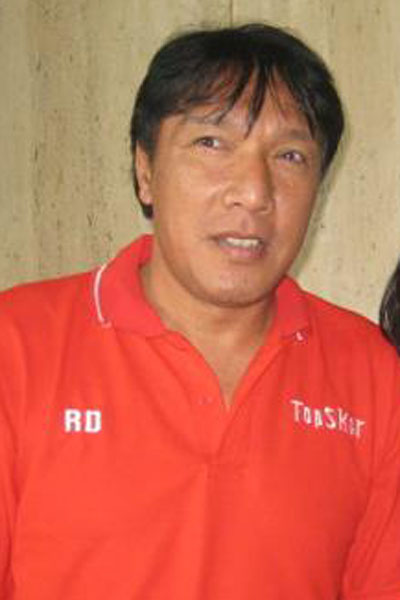

Personal information
- Full name: Robby Darwis
- Date of birth: 30 October 1964 (age 61)
- Place of birth: Bandung, Jawa Barat, Indonesia
- Position: Defender

Team information
- Current team: Persitara North Jakarta (head coach)

Youth career
- Arjuna
- SSB Capella

Senior career*
Years	Team	Apps	(Gls)
1983–1988	Persib Bandung	228	(12)
1989	Kelantan FA	1	(0)
1990–1998	Persib Bandung		
1999–2000	Persikab Bandung		

International career
1983–1997	Indonesia	55	(6)

Managerial career
- 2004–2006: Pro Duta FC
- 2007–2010: Persib Bandung (Coach Assistant)
- 2010: Persib Bandung
- 2010–2012: Persib Bandung (Coach Assistant)
- 2012: Persib Bandung
- 2015–2017: PSB Bogor
- 2017–2021: PSKC Cimahi
- 2025–: Persitara North Jakarta
Medal record
Men's football
Representing Indonesia
Southeast Asian Games
Gold medal – first place	1991 Philippines	Team
Gold medal – first place	1987 Jakarta	Team
Indonesia Independence Cup
Winner	1987 Indonesia
- * Club domestic league appearances and goals

Robby Darwis (born 30 October 1964) is an Indonesian former professional football player and current coach at Persitara North Jakarta. He is formerly the technical director for PSKC Cimahi, and one of Persib Bandung stars of his generation.

Darwis's position was a defender. In the first season of Liga Indonesia, as captain he brought Persib to championship. Darwis has also played in Malaysia Super League, at Kelantan FA. For Indonesia national football team, he played for 10 years (1987–1997), with 53 caps and 6 goals.

== Playing career ==
Darwis started his career as a teenage at local football club Arjuna and SSB Capella. Initially, he played as a forward or attacking midfielder. He took part in a selection by Persib in 1979 as held by Polish coach Marek Janota where he passed. He was first included in the senior squad in 1983.

In 1989, he was transferred to Malaysian club Kelantan FA. At the club, he was sent off in his debut match against Singapore FA on 11 July 1989 for allegedly kicking the referee. As a result, he was suspended for 3 months, and was unable to represent Indonesia at 1989 Southeast Asian Games. After reviewing, the suspension was lifted and he returned to Persib on 2 December upon being released by Kelantan.

He brought a lot of success to Persib during his time at the club, with 3 Perserikatan titles and the inaugural Liga Indonesia 1994-95. He also played in 1995 Asian Club Championship for Persib. In the first round, Persib defeated Bangkok Bank F.C. in 2-1 aggregate and Pasay on both second round matches. The team advanced to quarterfinals but finished at the bottom of the East Asia group stage. Later, he would play for Persikab Bandung and retired there.

He was part of Indonesia national football team that won gold medals at 1987 and 1991 SEA Games. He captained the team between 1993 and 1997 and would go on representing the country until 1997 SEA Games which the country hosted and won silver medal.

== Coaching career ==
Three years after his retirement, Darwis switched from playing to coaching where he was appointed coach of Pro Duta F.C. In 2007, he rejoined Persib as an assistant to Iurie Arcan, and remained at the club for 5 years. Darwis briefly coached Persib as a caretaker in 2007 and 2008, when Jaya Hartono resigned in 2009–10 season and in 2012 when Drago Mamić was sacked as coach.

He returned to becoming head coach in 2015 when he was recruited by PSB Bogor in Liga Nusantara. Later, he moved to PSKC Cimahi in 2017. He won the team regional West Java 2017 Liga 3 by beating Maung Anom on penalties (3-1) but were eliminated in the National Round group stage. In the following season, the team also repeated the fate, beating Persikab Bandung 2–0. Darwis then took the team to the finals of 2019 Liga 3, but the team lost 3–1 to Persijap Jepara, ensuring the team's first ever promotion to Liga 2 for the first time in its history.

In 2025, he was appointed as Persitara head coach, managing the club in the Liga Nusantara.

== Personal life ==
Robby Darwis is Muslim. Darwis works at BNI as a banker since he retired playing professionally. He is famous for his quote "halik ku aing!" that roughly translates to "move away, let me do this!" during his time playing for Persib, and his squad number 6 at the club. He occasionally plays for Persib Legends in charity exhibition matches.

== Career statistics ==
=== International ===
Appearances and goals by national team and year
National team	Year	Apps	Goals
Indonesia	1983	2	0
Indonesia	1986	4	0
Indonesia	1987	6	1
Indonesia	1988	5	0
Indonesia	1989	8	0
Indonesia	1991	8	1
Indonesia	1993	11	1
Indonesia	1996	8	2
Indonesia	1997	3	1
Total		55	6

Scores and results list Indonesia's goal tally first, score column indicates score after each Darwis goal.

List of international goals scored by Robby Darwis
No.	Date	Venue	Cap	Opponent	Score	Result	Competition
1	17 September 1987	Gelora Senayan Stadium, Jakarta, Indonesia	11	Burma	4–0	4–1	1987 SEA Games
2	28 November 1991	Rizal Memorial Stadium, Manila, Philippines	30	Vietnam	1–0	1–0	1987 SEA Games
3	15 June 1993	National Stadium, Kallang, Singapore	41	Philippines	1–0	3–1	1993 SEA Games
4	2 September 1996	Jurong Stadium, Jurong, Singapore	46	Laos	4–0	5–1	1996 AFF Championship
5	13 September 1996	National Stadium, Kallang, Singapore	50	Malaysia	1–2	1–3	1996 AFF Championship
6	5 October 1997	Gelora Senayan Stadium, Jakarta, Indonesia	53	Laos	1–0	5–2	1997 SEA Games

== Honours ==
=== Player ===
Persib Bandung

- Perserikatan: 1986, 1989–90, 1993–94
- Liga Indonesia Premier Division: 1994–95
- Sultan Hassanal Bolkiah Cup: 1986

Indonesia

- SEA Games gold medal: 1987, 1991; silver medal: 1997

Individual

- IFFHS Men’s All Time Indonesia Dream Team: 2022

=== Manager ===
PSKC Cimahi

- Liga 3 runner-up: 2019
- West Java round Liga 3: 2017, 2018, 2019

Preceded by Ferril Hattu; Sudirman	Indonesian Captain; 1993–1995; 1997	Succeeded by Sudirman; Aji Santoso
