= Lưu Kim Hoàng =

Vietnamese footballer (born 1948)

Personal information
- Full name: Lưu Kim Hoàng
- Date of birth: 1948 (age 76–77)
- Place of birth: Gò Công, Vietnam
- Position: Goalkeeper

Senior career*
Years	Team	Apps	(Gls)
1976–1988	Saigon Port		
- * Club domestic league appearances and goals

Lưu Kim Hoàng (Born 1948), also known as Hoàng "đế" (English: Emperor), is a former Vietnamese footballer who played as a goalkeeper.

== Club career ==
Born in Gò Công, South Vietnam. Hoàng moved to Ho Chi Minh City and joined Saigon Port in 1976, being one of the founder members of the club. In the club, he replaced former Sáng "lùn" and became the main goalkeeper for 13 years straight. In 1986, after winning the first V.League 1 for the club, he intended to retire but due to a lack of people, coach Tam Lang encouraged him to stay. He only retired in December 1988 when Nguyễn Hồng Phẩm took over his position.

== Personal life ==
After retiring, Hoàng still attend friendly matches as a former player for Saigon Port. He also returned to work in the towing department of the Saigon Port. In 2004, he left the port to work at the club as a grounds maintenance person for the football field and ticket inspector at Thong Nhat Stadium.

== Honours ==
=== Saigon Port ===
- V.League 1: 1986
- South Vietnam Football Championship: 1977, 1978, 1979
