= Chaiyong Khumpiam =

Thai footballer

Personal information
- Full name: Chaiyong Khumpiam
- Date of birth: 29 August 1965 (age 61)
- Place of birth: Bangkok, Thailand
- Height: 1.76 m (5 ft 9 1/2 in)
- Position: Goalkeeper

Senior career*
Years	Team	Apps	(Gls)
1985–1988	Osotsapa		
1988–2002	Police United		

International career
1991–1999	Thailand	64	(0)

Managerial career
- 2006–2007: Police United
- 2009–2010: Police United
- 2011: Buriram
- 2011–2012: Chiangmai
- 2014: PTT Rayong
- 2016: Thailand U16
- 2016–2017: Air Force Robinson
- 2017–2021: Thailand Women (goalkeeping coach)
Medal record
Men's football
Representing Thailand
Southeast Asian Games
Silver medal – second place	1991 Thailand	Team
- * Club domestic league appearances and goals as of 24 July 2009

Chaiyong Khumpiam (Thai: ชัยยง ขำเปี่ยม), is a Thai retired football player. He played for the national team between 1991 and 1999.

He is currently a sport commentator for PPTV.

== Personal life ==
Chaiyong's son, Sahawit Khumpiam, is also a goalkeeper.

== Honours ==
=== Player ===
Thailand

- SEA Games silver medal: 1991

Police United

Thai Division 1 League: 1999

=== Manager ===
Police Tero

Thai Division 1 League: 2006, 2009
