= Kas Hartadi =

Indonesian footballer and manager

Personal information
- Full name: Kas Hartadi
- Date of birth: 6 December 1970 (age 55)
- Place of birth: Surakarta, Indonesia
- Height: 1.67 m (5 ft 6 in)
- Position: Midfielder

Senior career*
Years	Team	Apps	(Gls)
1987	Arseto Solo		
1988–1991	KTB Bekasi		

International career
1990–1991	Indonesia	4	(1)

Managerial career
- 2009–2011: Sriwijaya (assistant coach)
- 2011–2013: Sriwijaya
- 2013–2014: Persikabo Bogor
- 2015: Cilegon United
- 2016: Persik Kediri
- 2017–2018: Kalteng Putra
- 2019: Sriwijaya
- 2021–2022: Dewa United
- 2022–2023: Dewa United (technical director)
- 2023–2024: PSIM Yogyakarta
- 2024–2025: PSKC Cimahi
- 2025–2026: PSMS Medan
- 2026: RANS Nusantara
- 2026: PSIS Semarang
Medal record
Men's football
Representing Indonesia
Southeast Asian Games
Gold medal – first place	1991 Philippines	Team
- * Club domestic league appearances and goals

Kas Hartadi (born 6 December 1970) is an Indonesian football manager/head coach, who was most recently the head coach of Championship club PSIS Semarang and former player.

== Honours ==
=== Player ===
Indonesia

- SEA Games gold medal: 1991

=== Managerial ===
Sriwijaya

- Indonesia Super League: 2011–12

Kalteng Putra

- Third Place at Liga 2 (promoted to Liga 1) : 2018

Dewa United

- Third Place at Liga 2 (promoted to Liga 1) : 2021

RANS Nusantara

- Liga Nusantara: 2025–26
