= Natee Thongsookkaew =

Thai footballer (born 1966)

Personal information
- Full name: Natee Thongsookkaew
- Date of birth: 9 December 1966 (age 59)
- Place of birth: Uttaradit, Thailand
- Height: 1.78 m (5 ft 10 in)
- Position: Centre-back

Youth career
- 1981–1983: Thong Tawee Thai Club

Senior career*
Years	Team	Apps	(Gls)
1983	Thavorn Farm	8	(0)
1984–1988	Nakhon Sawan	47	(0)
1989–1990	Matsushita	11	(0)
1991–1999	Royal Thai Police	245	(6)
Total		311	(6)

International career
1985	Thailand U19	8	(0)
1986–2000	Thailand	87	(1)
Medal record
Thailand national football team
Sea Games
Silver medal – second place	Sea Games 1991	Football
Gold medal – first place	Sea Games 1993	Football
Gold medal – first place	Sea Games 1995	Football
Gold medal – first place	Sea Games 1997	Football
- * Club domestic league appearances and goals

Natee Thongsookkaew (also spelled Thongsukkao, Thai: นที ทองสุขแก้ว; born 8 December 1966) is a former Thai footballer. He played for the Thailand national team from 1986 to 2000.

== International goals ==
#	Date	Venue	Opponent	Score	Result	Competition
1.	February 12, 1988	UAE	Bangladesh	1-1	Drew	1988 AFC Asian Cup qualification
