= Ferril Hattu =

Indonesian footballer

Personal information
- Full name: Ferril Raymond Hattu
- Date of birth: 9 August 1962 (age 64)
- Place of birth: Surabaya, Indonesia
- Position: Libero

Youth career
- SSB Indonesia Muda
- 1976–1978: HBS Surabaya
- 1978–1980: Persebaya Surabaya

Senior career*
Years	Team	Apps	(Gls)
1980–1981	NIAC Mitra		
1981–1983	Persebaya Surabaya		
1983–1985	NIAC Mitra		
1985–1988	Persegres Gresik		
1988–1992	Petrokimia Putra		

International career
1984–1993	Indonesia	21	(1)
Medal record
Men's football
Representing Indonesia
Southeast Asian Games
Gold medal – first place	1991 Philippines	Team
Bronze medal – third place	1989 Malaysia	Team
- * Club domestic league appearances and goals

Ferril Raymond Hattu (born 9 August 1962) is an Indonesian football coach and former player who played in the libero position. He captained the Indonesia national team when they won the gold medal at the 1991 SEA Games.

== Early life ==
Ferril Raymond Hattu was born on 9 August 1962 in Surabaya, East Java to parents originally from Saparua, Maluku. His father, Johannes Agustinus Hattu, widely known as J. A. Hattu, was a former coach of Persebaya Surabaya, succeeded in bringing the team to win the Perserikatan in 1978.

He began his youth football career at SSB Indonesia Muda at the age of six. During his time there, he trained alongside two other future Indonesian football legends, Jacob Sihasale and Abdul Kadir. In 1976, he moved to Harapan Budi Setiawan (HBS) Surabaya, a youth club of Persebaya Surabaya.

== Club career ==
During his playing career, Hattu has played for several clubs, such as NIAC Mitra, Persebaya Surabaya, Persegres Gresik and Petrokimia Putra, before his retirement in 1992. Alongside NIAC Mitra, he successfully won the Galatama league for two consecutive seasons, specifically in the 1980–82 and 1982–83 seasons.

== Career statistics ==
=== International ===
Appearances and goals by national team and year
National team	Year	Apps	Goals
Indonesia	1985	2	0
Indonesia	1988	1	0
Indonesia	1989	3	0
Indonesia	1990	2	0
Indonesia	1991	10	1
Indonesia	1992	3	0
Total		21	1

Scores and results list Indonesia's goal tally first, score column indicates score after each Hattu goal.

List of international goals scored by Ferril Hattu
No.	Date	Venue	Cap	Opponent	Score	Result	Competition
1	30 November 1991	Rizal Memorial Stadium, Manila, Philippines	16	Philippines	1–1	2–1	1991 SEA Games

== Honours ==
NIAC Mitra

- Galatama: 1980–82, 1982–83

Indonesia

- SEA Games gold medal: 1991; bronze medal: 1989

Preceded by Ricky Yacobi	Indonesian Captain; 1991–1992	Succeeded by Robby Darwis
