= David Lee (Singaporean footballer) =

Singaporean footballer

Personal information
- Full name: David Lee Soon Chye
- Date of birth: 10 April 1958 (age 68)
- Place of birth: Singapore
- Position: Goalkeeper

Senior career*
Years	Team	Apps	(Gls)
1979–1994	Singapore FA	161	(0)
????–1981	Tiong Bahru		
1982–1983	Niac Mitra		
1984–????	Tiong Bahru		
1987–1998	Tyrwhitt Soccerites		
1989–	Jurong Town		
1996–1997	Geylang United	34	

International career
1979–1991	Singapore	105	(0)
Medal record
Men's football
Representing Singapore
Southeast Asian Games
Silver medal – second place	1983	Team
Bronze medal – third place	1991 Philippines	Team
- * Club domestic league appearances and goals

David Lee Soon Chye (born 10 April 1958) is a Singaporean former footballer who last played for the Singapore national football team and Geylang United as a goalkeeper.

He was part of the Singapore Malaysia League side that won the 1994 Malaysia Cup and Malaysian League title. He had also won the first ever S.league title and Singapore Cup "double", with Geylang United in 1996. He had since retired from professional football in 1997.

== Early life ==
Lee was born to a mechanic and housewife in 1958 and stayed in Commonwealth, Singapore. As the eldest child, he has two younger brothers and two younger sisters.

At 15, Lee was selected for the National Youth badminton team. He was subsequently spotted by Football Association of Singapore chairman N. Ganesan and was drafted into the National Youth football team.

== Football career ==
=== Club career ===
==== Niac Mitra ====
In 1982, Lee, with Fandi Ahmad, joined Indonesian club Niac Mitra. In 1983, Lee left Niac Mitra due to a sudden Galatama League ban on foreign players.

==== Tiong Bahru ====
Lee rejoined Tiong Bahru Constituency Sports Club on his return to Singapore.

==== Tyrwhitt Soccerites ====
In 1987, Lee joined the Tyrwhitt Soccerites, playing in Division Two in Singapore football.

==== Jurong Town ====
At the end of 1988, Lee joined Jurong Town, despite Tyrwhitt Soccerites promoted from Division Two to Division One in 1988 and then promoted to the FAS Premier League at the end of the 1988 season.

=== International career ===
After three years in the National Youth team, Lee was picked for the national football team and became the reserve goalkeeper for Edmund Wee in 1979.

In 1980, during the Asian group of the pre-Olympics tournament, Wee was injured shortly after the start of a match against North Korea. Lee was substituted on and Singapore won the match 3–1. As a result, he was chosen again for the Malaysia Cup final later in the year where Singapore won 2–1 against Selangor.

Lee played for the national team in the 1983 SEA Games and won the silver medal.

In 1995, Lee was investigated for match fixing, along with some other national football team players, for a match between Singapore and Perlis. He and the other players were subsequently cleared of the charges by the Corrupt Practices Investigation Bureau of Singapore.

== Coaching career ==
Lee is the former goalkeeping coach of Singapore Armed Forces Football Club and currently trains the youth goalkeepers at the Singapore Sports School.

== Honours ==
=== Singapore FA ===
- Malaysia Cup: 1980 1994
- Malaysia Premier League: 1994
- Sultan Haji Ahmad Shah Cup: 1989

=== Geylang United ===
- S League: 1996

Sporting positions
Preceded by Fandi Ahmad	Singapore national team captain 1996	Succeeded by Lim Tong Hai
