= Salahudin (footballer, born 1970) =

Indonesian footballer and manager

Personal information
- Full name: Salahudin
- Date of birth: 30 January 1970 (age 56)
- Place of birth: Palembang, Indonesia
- Height: 1.75 m (5 ft 9 in)
- Position: Defender

Youth career
- 1986–1987: Diklat Palembang
- 1987–1988: Diklat Ragunan

Senior career*
Years	Team	Apps	(Gls)
1989–2000	Barito Putera		
2001–2002	Mitra Kalteng		
2002–2003	PSS Sleman		
2003–2004	Persegi Gianyar		

International career
1988	Indonesia U-19		
1989	Indonesia U-21		
1989–1994	Indonesia		

Managerial career
- 2005–2007: Persepar
- 2007–2015: Barito Putera
- 2016: Perssu Sumenep
- 2017–2018: Madura
- 2019: Persiba Balikpapan
- 2019–2020: Persis Solo
- 2022–2023: Persijap Jepara
- 2023–2024: Nusantara United
Medal record
Men's football
Representing Indonesia
Southeast Asian Games
Gold medal – first place	1991 Philippines	Team
- * Club domestic league appearances and goals

Salahudin (born 30 January 1970) is a former Indonesian football player and football manager.

== Careers ==
Salahudin represented the Indonesia national team. He earned several caps in 1991, including the 1991 Southeast Asian Games. In the 2011/2012 season of Liga Indonesia Premier Division, he brought Barito Putera to become champions, and was promoted to Indonesia Super League in 2013.

== Honours ==
=== Player ===
Indonesia

- SEA Games gold medal: 1991

=== Manager ===
Barito Putera

- Liga Indonesia Premier Division: 2011–12
- Liga Indonesia Second Division: 2008–09
