= Anatoli Polosin =

Russian professional football coach

Personal information
- Full name: Anatoli Fyodorovich Polosin
- Date of birth: 30 August 1935
- Place of birth: Tashkent, Uzbek SSR
- Date of death: 11 September 1997 (aged 62)
- Place of death: Moscow, Russia

Managerial career
- Years: Team
- 1970: FC Shakhter Karagandy (assistant)
- 1971: FC Karpaty Lviv (assistant)
- 1972: FC Karpaty Lviv
- 1972–1973: FC Karpaty Lviv (assistant)
- 1974: FC Nistru Chişinău (assistant)
- 1975–1978: FC Nistru Chişinău
- 1979: Kolkhozchi Ashgabat
- 1980–1981: SC Tavriya Simferopol
- 1982–1983: FC Nistru Chişinău (assistant)
- 1984: FC Rostselmash Rostov-on-Don
- 1985: FC SKA Rostov-on-Don
- 1985: FC Nistru Chişinău
- 1986: FC Chornomorets Odesa
- 1987: FC Fakel Voronezh
- 1987–1991: Indonesia
- 1995: FC Arsenal Tula
- 1996–1997: FC Shinnik Yaroslavl
Medal record
Men's football
Representing Indonesia (as manager)
Southeast Asian Games
| Gold medal – first place | 1991 Philippines | Team |

Anatoli Fyodorovich Polosin (Russian: Анатолий Фёдорович Полосин; 30 August 1935 – 11 September 1997) was a Russian professional football coach.

== Career ==
Polosin led three clubs through promotion to the top division of Soviet or Russian football: SC Tavriya Simferopol, FC Chornomorets Odesa and FC Shinnik Yaroslavl. He also managed the Indonesia national football team from 1987 to 1991, where he helped nurturing Indonesia's Golden Generation that became one of Southeast Asia's best during that times.

== Honours ==
=== Manager ===
SC Tavriya Simferopol

- Soviet First League: 1980

FC Chornomorets Odesa

- Soviet First League: 1987

Indonesia

- SEA Games Gold Medal: 1991
