= Rochy Putiray =

Indonesian footballer

Personal information
- Full name: Rochy Melkiano Putiray
- Date of birth: 26 June 1970 (age 56)
- Place of birth: Ambon, Indonesia
- Height: 1.75 m (5 ft 9 in)
- Position: Forward

Senior career*
Years	Team	Apps	(Gls)
1987–1998	Arseto	219	(180)
1990–1991	→ Dukla Prague (loan)	8	(1)
1999–2000	Persija Jakarta	20	(15)
2000–2001	Instant-Dict	22	(12)
2001–2002	Happy Valley	25	(17)
2002	PSM Makassar	20	(4)
2002–2003	South China	32	(42)
2003	Persijatim Solo	16	(7)
2003–2004	Kitchee	26	(16)
2004–2005	PSPS Pekanbaru	26	(14)
2006–2007	PSS Sleman	15	(8)
Total		429	(313)

International career
1991	Indonesia U23		
1987–1991	Indonesia B		
1990–2004	Indonesia	44	(17)
Medal record
Men's football
Representing Indonesia
Southeast Asian Games
Gold medal – first place	1991 Philippines	Team
ASEAN Football Championship
Runner-up	2000 Thailand
- * Club domestic league appearances and goals

Rochy Melkiano Putiray (born 26 June 1970) is an Indonesian former footballer who played as a striker for Indonesia national football team. He was likely the most recognizable player on the Indonesia national football team due to his brightly colored and constantly changing hair.

In his career, Putiray has played for Arseto Solo, Dukla Prague, Persija Jakarta, Instant-Dict, Kitchee and South China. He moved to Instant-Dict after being spotted by the Hong Kong club during the Asian Cup Qualifier between Hong Kong and Indonesia. He helped Kitchee beat AC Milan 2–1 by scoring 2 goals during a friendly match in 2004. He graduated from Faculty of Law in Universitas Surakarta (UNSA), a university based in Surakarta, Indonesia. In 2012, he began to coach UNSA sport school, in his native Indonesia.

== Career statistics ==
=== International ===
Appearances and goals by national team and year
National team	Year	Apps	Goals
Indonesia	1990	1	1
Indonesia	1991	5	2
Indonesia	1992	3	0
Indonesia	1993	6	0
Indonesia	1996	2	2
Indonesia	1997	10	3
Indonesia	1999	10	9
Indonesia	2000	5	0
Indonesia	2004	2	0
Total		44	17

Scores and results list Indonesia's goal tally first, score column indicates score after each Putiray goal.

List of international goals scored by Rochy Putiray
No.	Date	Venue	Opponent	Score	Result	Competition
1	26 November 1991	Rizal Memorial Stadium, Manila, Philippines	Malaysia	2–0	2–0	1991 Southeast Asian Games
2	30 November 1991	Rizal Memorial Stadium, Manila, Philippines	Philippines	2–1	2–1	1991 Southeast Asian Games
3	11 August 1992	Senayan Stadium, Jakarta, Indonesia	Thailand	1–0	4–1	1992 Indonesian Independence Cup
4	4 March 1996	Kuala Lumpur, Malaysia	India	2–1	7–1	1996 AFC Asian Cup qualification
5	4 March 1996	Kuala Lumpur, Malaysia	India	5–1	7–1	1996 AFC Asian Cup qualification
6	6 April 1997	Senayan Stadium, Jakarta, Indonesia	Cambodia	3–0	8–0	1998 FIFA World Cup qualification
7	6 April 1997	Senayan Stadium, Jakarta, Indonesia	Cambodia	6–0	8–0	1998 FIFA World Cup qualification
8	6 April 1997	Senayan Stadium, Jakarta, Indonesia	Cambodia	8–0	8–0	1998 FIFA World Cup qualification
9	2 August 1999	Berakas Track and Field Complex, Bandar Seri Begawan, Brunei	Malaysia	2–0	6–0	1999 Southeast Asian Games
10	2 August 1999	Berakas Track and Field Complex, Bandar Seri Begawan, Brunei	Malaysia	6–0	6–0	1999 Southeast Asian Games
11	24 October 1999	Hong Kong	Hong Kong	1–1	1–1	2000 AFC Asian Cup qualification
12	30 October 1999	Phnom Penh, Cambodia	Cambodia	3–0	5–1	2000 AFC Asian Cup qualification
13	30 October 1999	Phnom Penh, Cambodia	Cambodia	4–0	5–1	2000 AFC Asian Cup qualification
14	14 November 1999	Senayan Stadium, Jakarta, Indonesia	Hong Kong	2–0	3–1	2000 AFC Asian Cup qualification
15	20 November 1999	Senayan Stadium, Jakarta, Indonesia	Cambodia	1–0	9–2	2000 AFC Asian Cup qualification
16	20 November 1999	Senayan Stadium, Jakarta, Indonesia	Cambodia	4–1	9–2	2000 AFC Asian Cup qualification
17	20 November 1999	Senayan Stadium, Jakarta, Indonesia	Cambodia	9–2	9–2	2000 AFC Asian Cup qualification

== Honours ==
Persis Solo

- Galatama-Perserikatan Invitational Championship: 1987
- Galatama: 1987

Instant-Dict

- Hong Kong FA Cup: 2000–01

South China AA

- Hong Kong Senior Shield: 2002–03

Indonesia

- AFF Championship runner-up: 2000, 2002; third place: 1998
- SEA Games gold medal: 1991; bronze medal: 1999

Individual

- Asian Goal of the Month: April 1997
