= Hanafing =

Indonesian footballer and coach

Personal information
- Full name: Muhammad Hanafing Ibrahim
- Date of birth: 20 June 1963 (age 63)
- Place of birth: Makassar, Indonesia
- Position: Midfielder

Youth career
- −1982: Bima Kencana

Senior career*
Years	Team	Apps	(Gls)
1982−1983	Bima Kencana		
1983−1993	Mitra Surabaya (Note: The club was still known as NIAC Mitra when Hanafing joined in 1983.)		
1993−1995	Persegres Gresik		

International career
1989–1991	Indonesia	11	(3)

Managerial career
- 2009−2010: PSM Makassar
- 2010–2011: PSIS Semarang
- 2012: PSIM Yogyakarta
- 2018–2020: Persebaya Surabaya (youth)
- 2020: Semeru
- 2021–2023: Persipal Palu (technical director)
- 2024: Persis Solo (interim)
Medal record
Men's football
Representing Indonesia
Southeast Asian Games
Gold medal – first place	1991 Philippines	Team
Bronze medal – third place	1989 Malaysia	Team
- * Club domestic league appearances and goals

Muhammad Hanafing Ibrahim (born 6 September 1964), known mononymously as Hanafing, is an Indonesian football manager and former player who played as a midfielder. He represented the Indonesia national team from 1989 to 1991, scoring 3 goals in 11 matches.

== Club career ==
During his playing career, Hanafing played for Bima Kencana, NIAC Mitra (which later changed its name to Mitra Surabaya), and Persegres Gresik before his retirement in 1995.

== International career ==
Hanafing first represented the Indonesia national team on 25 June 1989, during a 3–2 win in a qualifying match for the 1990 FIFA World Cup against Hong Kong. Two months later, on 23 August, he scored his inaugural international goal, scoring a brace to a 5–1 triumph over the Philippines at the 1989 SEA Games in Kuala Lumpur, Malaysia.

== Career statistics ==
=== International ===
Appearances and goals by national team and year
National team	Year	Apps	Goals
Indonesia	1989	4	3
Indonesia	1990	2	0
Indonesia	1991	5	0
Total		11	3

Scores and results list Indonesia's goal tally first, score column indicates score after each Hanafing goal.

List of international goals scored by Mustaqim
No.	Date	Venue	Cap	Opponent	Score	Result	Competition
1	23 August 1989	Cheras Stadium, Kuala Lumpur, Malaysia	2	Philippines	3–1	5–1	1989 SEA Games
2	23 August 1989	Cheras Stadium, Kuala Lumpur, Malaysia	2	Philippines	5–1	5–1	1989 SEA Games
3	30 August 1989	Merdeka Stadium, Kuala Lumpur, Malaysia	4	Thailand	1–0	1–1	1989 SEA Games

== Honours ==
Mitra Surabaya

- Galatama: 1987–88

Indonesia

- SEA Games gold medal: 1991; bronze medal: 1989
