= Aji Santoso =

Indonesian former footballer (born 1970)

Personal information
- Full name: Aji Santoso
- Date of birth: 6 April 1970 (age 56)
- Place of birth: Malang, East Java, Indonesia
- Height: 1.65 m (5 ft 5 in)
- Position: Left-back

Team information
- Current team: de Red (head coach)

Senior career*
Years	Team	Apps	(Gls)
1987–1995	Arema Malang		
1995–1999	Persebaya Surabaya		
1999–2000	PSM Makassar		
2001	Persema Malang		
2002–2004	Arema Malang	24+	(0+)

International career
1990–2000	Indonesia	46	(5)

Managerial career
- 2005–2006: Indonesia U–17
- 2006: Persiko Kota Baru
- 2006–2007: Pra PON Jatim
- 2007: POMNAS Jatim
- 2007: Persekam Metro FC
- 2008: PON Jatim
- 2008–2009: POM ASEAN
- 2009: Persik Kediri
- 2009: Persebaya Surabaya
- 2009–2010: Persisam Putra Samarinda
- 2010: Persema Malang
- 2010–2011: Persebaya 1927
- 2011–2013: Indonesia U-23 (assistant)
- 2012: Indonesia U-23
- 2012: Indonesia (caretaker)
- 2012–2013: Indonesia U-23
- 2015: Indonesia U-23
- 2017: Arema
- 2017–2019: Persela Lamongan
- 2019: PSIM Yogyakarta
- 2019–2023: Persebaya Surabaya
- 2023–2024: Persikabo 1973
- 2024–2025: PSPS Pekanbaru
- 2025: Persela Lamongan
- 2025–2026: PSPS Pekanbaru
- 2026–: de Red
Medal record
Men's football
Representing Indonesia
Southeast Asian Games
Gold medal – first place	1991 Philippines	Team
- * Club domestic league appearances and goals

Aji Santoso (born 6 April 1970 in Malang, East Java, Indonesia) is an Indonesian former professional footballer and football head coach. He is the current head coach of Championship club de Red. He was a left-back during his playing days, and was a regular for the Indonesia national football team and Persebaya Surabaya. He was also the caretaker manager of the Indonesia national football team in 2012, after the sacking of Wim Rijsbergen.

== International goals ==
#	Date	Venue	Opponent	Score	Result	Competition
1	21 September 1997	Gelora 10 November Stadium, Surabaya, Indonesia	New Zealand	2–0	5–0	Friendly
2	29 August 1998	Thong Nhat Stadium, Ho Chi Minh City, Vietnam	Myanmar	1–1	6–2	1998 Tiger Cup
3	31 August 1998	Thong Nhat Stadium, Ho Chi Minh City, Vietnam	Thailand	2–1	2–3	1998 Tiger Cup
4	5 September 1998	Thong Nhat Stadium, Ho Chi Minh City, Vietnam	Thailand	2–1	3–3	1998 Tiger Cup
5	6 November 2000	700th Anniversary Stadium, Chiang Mai, Thailand	Philippines	1–0	3–0	2000 Tiger Cup

== Honours ==
=== Player ===
Arema Malang

- Galatama: 1992–93
- Liga Indonesia First Division: 2004

Persebaya Surabaya

- Liga Indonesia Premier Division: 1996–97; runner up: 1998–99

PSM Makassar

- Liga Indonesia Premier Division: 1999–2000

Indonesia

- SEA Games (gold) Gold Medal: 1991; (silver) Silver Medal: 1997; (bronze) Bronze Medal: 1999
- AFF Championship runner-up: 2000; third place: 1998

Individual

- IFFHS Men's All Time Indonesia Dream Team: 2022

=== Manager ===
Persebaya Surabaya

- Liga Primer Indonesia: 2011
- Liga 1 Runner Up: 2019
- East Java Governor Cup: 2020

Arema

- Indonesia President's Cup: 2017

Individual

- Liga 1 Coach of the Month: October 2021, December 2021
- Liga 1 Best Coach: 2021–22

Preceded by Robby Darwis	Indonesian Captain; 1998–2000	Succeeded by Bima Sakti
