= Yusuf Ekodono =

Indonesian footballer, coach, and manager

Personal information
- Full name: Yusuf Ekodono
- Date of birth: 16 April 1967 (age 59)
- Place of birth: Surabaya, Indonesia
- Height: 1.70 m (5 ft 7 in)
- Positions: Midfielder; forward

Senior career*
Years	Team	Apps	(Gls)
1986–1995	Persebaya Surabaya		
1995–1996	PSM Makassar		
1996–2000	Persebaya Surabaya		

International career
1991–1998	Indonesia	11	(1)

Managerial career
- 2022–: Bhayangkara U–20
Medal record
Men's football
Representing Indonesia
Southeast Asian Games
Gold medal – first place	1991 Philippines	Team
- * Club domestic league appearances and goals

Yusuf Ekodono (born 16 April 1967) is an Indonesian former footballer and manager/coach who previously work as a manager for Persebaya DU (Bhayangkara) in 2011-12 Liga Indonesia Premier Division (LI).

He is the father of Fandi Eko Utomo and Wahyu Suboseto.

== International career ==
=== International goals ===
No.	Date	Venue	Opponent	Score	Result	Competition
1.	5 September 1998	Thống Nhất Stadium, Ho Chi Minh City, Vietnam	Thailand	3–3	3–3	1998 Tiger Cup

== Hounors ==
Persebaya Surabaya

- Perserikatan: 1987–88
- Piala Utama: 1990
- Liga Indonesia Premier Division: 1996–97; runner up: 1998–99

PSM Makassar

- Liga Indonesia Premier Division runner-up: 1995–96

Indonesia

- SEA Games gold medal: 1991
