= Football at the 1989 SEA Games =

1989 SEA Games Football
Tournament details
- Host country: Malaysia
- Dates: 21–31 August
- Teams: 7
- Venues: 2 (in 1 host city)

Final positions
- Champions: Malaysia (4th title)
- Runners-up: Singapore
- Third place: Indonesia
- Fourth place: Thailand

Tournament statistics
- Matches played: 13
- Goals scored: 39 (3 per match)

Football was contested as part of the programme for the 1989 Southeast Asian Games which was hosted in Kuala Lumpur, Indonesia from 20 to 31 August 1989. It was the 16th edition of the men's football tournament at the multi-sport event organised by the SEA Games Federation Committee.

The football tournament began with the first matches of the group stage on 21 August 1989 and ended with the gold medal match on 31 August 1989. Hosts Malaysia and Singapore contested the final. Malaysia defeated Singapore 3–1 to win the gold medal. In the bronze medal match, Indonesia defeated Thailand 9–8 on penalties.

== Background ==
Football had been part of the Southeast Asian Games programme following the debut of the men's competition at the inaugural 1959 SEAP Games in Thailand. Indonesia were the defending champions after defeating Malaysia 1–0 after extra time in the gold medal match at the previous edition in 1987. Burma and Thailand were the most successful teams having both won the gold medal five times previously.

== Format ==
In total, six teams took part in the competition. They were drawn into two single round robin groups of three teams. The winners and runners-up would then contest the semi-finals which would decide the teams contesting the gold and bronze medal matches.

=== Participants ===
- Brunei
- Myanmar
- Indonesia
- Malaysia
- Philippines
- Singapore
- Thailand

== Venue ==
Matches were played at the Merdeka Stadium in Kuala Lumpur, Malaysia.

== Group stage ==
=== Group A ===
Singapore and Thailand advanced to the semi-finals.

==== Table ====
Pos	Team	Pld	W	D	L	GF	GA	GD	Pts	Qualification
1	Singapore	2	1	1	0	5	1	+4	3	Advance to semi-finals
2	Thailand	2	1	1	0	4	1	+3	3	Advance to semi-finals
3	Myanmar	2	0	0	2	0	7	−7	0	

==== Matches ====
22 August 1989
20:00

Thailand	3–0	Myanmar
Pue-On 42', 67'; Changmool

Merdeka Stadium, Kuala Lumpur

24 August 1989
20:00

Singapore	1–1	Thailand
Sundramoorthy 79'		Pue-On 44'

Merdeka Stadium, Kuala Lumpur

26 August 1989
20:00

Singapore	4–0	Myanmar
Haron 24'; Sundramoorthy 36'; Nasiron 81'; Ahmad 87'

Merdeka Stadium, Kuala Lumpur
Referee: N. Subramaniam (Malaysia)

=== Group B ===
Malaysia and Indonesia advanced to the semi-finals.

==== Table ====
Pos	Team	Pld	W	D	L	GF	GA	GD	Pts	Qualification
1	Malaysia	3	3	0	0	7	1	+6	6	Advance to semi-finals
2	Indonesia	3	2	0	1	11	3	+8	4	Advance to semi-finals
3	Brunei	3	1	0	2	3	8	−5	2	
4	Philippines	3	0	0	3	1	10	−9	0	

==== Matches ====
21 August 1989
19:45

Indonesia	6–0	Brunei
Mustaqim 30', 33', 43'; Wijaya 56', 87'; Hartono 58'

Merdeka Stadium, Kuala Lumpur
21 August 1989
21:30

Malaysia	3–0	Philippines
Anbalagan 4', 41'; Radhi 28'

Merdeka Stadium, Kuala Lumpur

23 August 1989
19:45

Malaysia	2–1	Brunei
Radhi 28'; Ravichandran 86'		Unknown 69'

Merdeka Stadium, Kuala Lumpur
23 August 1989
21:30

Indonesia	5–1	Philippines
Wijaya 21'; Hanafing 59', 82'; Yacobi 62'; Mustaqim 73'		Alicante 8'

Merdeka Stadium, Kuala Lumpur

25 August 1989
19:45

Brunei	2–0	Philippines

Merdeka Stadium, Kuala Lumpur
25 August 1989
21:30

Malaysia	2–0	Indonesia
Lim Teong Kim 39', 52'

Merdeka Stadium, Kuala Lumpur

== Semi-finals ==
Singapore defeated Indonesia and Malaysia defeated Thailand to advance to the gold medal match.

28 August 1989
19:45

Singapore	1–0	Indonesia
Ahmad 90'

Merdeka Stadium, Kuala Lumpur
28 August 1989
21:30

Malaysia	1–0	Thailand
Hassan 71'

Merdeka Stadium, Kuala Lumpur

== Bronze medal match ==
Indonesia defeated Thailand on penalties to win the bronze medal.

30 August 1989
20:00

Indonesia	1–1 (a.e.t.)	Thailand
Wijaya 60'		Penglee 74'
Penalties
	9–8

Merdeka Stadium, Kuala Lumpur

== Gold medal match ==
Malaysia defeated Singapore to win the gold medal.

31 August 1989
20:00

Malaysia	3–1	Singapore
Samah 8' (o.g.); Lim Teong Kim 59'; Salleh 60'		Ahmad 39'

Merdeka Stadium, Kuala LumpurStadium Merdeka, Kuala Lumpur
Attendance: 45,000
Referee: Soetoyo (Indonesia)
