= Widodo Cahyono Putro =

Indonesian footballer and head coach

Widodo C. Putro
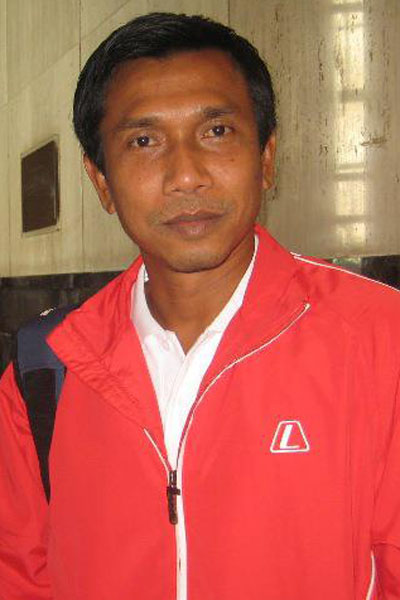
- Putro in September 2011

Personal information
- Full name: Widodo Cahyono Putro
- Date of birth: 8 November 1970 (age 55)
- Place of birth: Cilacap, Indonesia
- Height: 1.70 m (5 ft 7 in)
- Position: Forward

Team information
- Current team: PSIS Semarang (head coach)

Senior career*
Years	Team	Apps	(Gls)
1990–1994	Warna Agung	94	(31)
1994–1998	Petrokimia Putra	77	(39)
1998–2002	Persija Jakarta	62	(15)
2002–2004	Petrokimia Putra	25	(15)
Total		258	(100)

International career
1991–1999	Indonesia	55	(14)

Managerial career
- 2010–2011: Indonesia (Assistant)
- 2012: Indonesia U21
- 2013: Gresik United
- 2014: Indonesia (Assistant)
- 2015: Persepam Madura Utama
- 2016–2017: Sriwijaya
- 2017–2018: Bali United
- 2019–2022: Persita
- 2022–2023: Bhayangkara
- 2023–2024: Deltras
- 2024: Arema
- 2024: Madura United
- 2024–2025: Persijap Jepara
- 2025–2026: Deltras
- 2026: Garudayaksa
- 2026–: PSIS Semarang
Medal record
Men's football
Representing Indonesia
Southeast Asian Games
Bronze medal – third place	1999 Manila	Team
Silver medal – second place	1997 Jakarta	Team
Gold medal – first place	1991 Manila	Team
- * Club domestic league appearances and goals

Widodo Cahyono Putro (born 8 November 1970) is an Indonesian former football player and head coach for Championship club PSIS Semarang. Putro gained fame for scoring a goal with a bicycle kick in a match against Kuwait in the 1996 AFC Asian Cup.

== Club career ==
Widodo Cahyono Putro began his career in Galatama with the club Warna Agung, shortly before the first national professional competition, the Liga Indonesia. For the 1994–1995 season began he was transferred to league runners-up Petrokimia Putra Gresik. Following consistent success there, in 1998–1999 he joined one of the major Jakartan clubs, Persija Jakarta, and at least he gained Indonesia League trophy with Petrokimia Gresik in 2002 and he retired in their club whose make his name famous Petrokimia Gresik.

== International career ==
He received his first international cap in 1991 and retired from the Indonesia national football team in 1999, appearing in 55 matches. He was once again called to the national side for the 2000 AFC Asian Cup in Lebanon, but he did not make any appearances in the tournament. 1996 AFC Asian Cup was the first time Indonesia qualified for the final round. In their first game against Kuwait, Widodo C Putro scored the first goal for Indonesia in the history of the tournament.

== Managerial career ==
=== Bali United ===
On 10 May 2017, he was appointed as the head coach of Bali United. Putro eventually led his team to be the most productive team in the league with 76 goals, and finishing second in the league. On 29 November 2018, Putro decided to part ways with Bali United. There were some rumours stating that he left because of the dispute he had with Irfan Bachdim. However he stated that he was only following a clause in his contract that said the partnership would end if Bali United lost three in a row.

=== Persita Tangerang ===
On 18 January 2019, Putro was officially appointed as the new manager of Persita Tangerang. Putro eventually brought his team to promotion by finishing as Liga 2 runners up.

== Career statistics ==
=== International ===
Scores and results list Indonesia's goal tally first, score column indicates score after each Widodo goal.

List of international goals scored by Widodo Cahyono Putro
No.	Date	Venue	Opponent	Score	Result	Competition
1	26 November 1991	Rizal Memorial Stadium, Manila, Philippines	Malaysia	1-0	2–0	1991 Southeast Asian Games
2	6 December 1995	700th Anniversary Stadium, Chiang Mai, Thailand	Cambodia	–	10–0	1995 Southeast Asian Games
3	4 December 1996	Mohammed bin Zayed Stadium, Abu Dhabi, United Arab Emirates	Kuwait	1–0	2–2	1996 AFC Asian Cup
4	7 December 1996	Mohammed bin Zayed Stadium, Abu Dhabi, United Arab Emirates	South Korea	4–2	4–2	1996 AFC Asian Cup
5	24 February 1997	Merdeka Stadium, Kuala Lumpur, Malaysia	Vietnam	1–0	1–0	1997 Dunhill Cup
6	6 April 1997	Gelora Senayan Stadium, Jakarta, Indonesia	Cambodia	1–0	8–0	1998 FIFA World Cup qualification
7	27 April 1997	Phnom Penh, Cambodia	Cambodia	1–1	1–1	1998 FIFA World Cup qualification
8	13 June 1997	Sanaa, Yemen	Yemen	1–1	1–1	1998 FIFA World Cup qualification
9	5 October 1997	Gelora Senayan Stadium, Jakarta, Indonesia	Laos	2–0	5–2	1997 Southeast Asian Games
10	5 October 1997	Gelora Senayan Stadium, Jakarta, Indonesia	Laos	5–1	5–2	1997 Southeast Asian Games
11	9 October 1997	Gelora Senayan Stadium, Jakarta, Indonesia	Malaysia	3–0	4–0	1997 Southeast Asian Games
12	27 August 1998	Thống Nhất Stadium, Ho Chi Minh City, Vietnam	Philippines	1–0	3–0	1998 Tiger Cup
13	29 August 1998	Thống Nhất Stadium, Ho Chi Minh City, Vietnam	Myanmar	2–1	6–2	1998 Tiger Cup
14	20 November 1999	Gelora Senayan Stadium, Jakarta, Indonesia	Cambodia	8–2	9–2	2000 AFC Asian Cup qualification

== Honours ==
=== Player ===
Petrokimia Putra

- Liga Indonesia Premier Division runner-up: 1994–95

Persija Jakarta

- Liga Indonesia Premier Division: 2001

Petrokimia Putra

- Liga Indonesia Premier Division: 2002

Indonesia

- SEA Games (gold) Gold Medal: 1991; (silver) Silver Medal: 1997; (bronze) 1999

Individual

- Liga Indonesia Premier Division Best Player: 1994–95
- AFC Asian Cup Greatest Goals Bracket Challenge

=== Manager ===
Bali United

• Runner Up Liga 1 2017

- Piala Presiden runners-up: 2018

Persita Tangerang

- Liga 2 runners-up: 2019

Garudayaksa

- Juara Pegadaian Championship: 2025–26
