= Sudirman (footballer, born 1969) =

Indonesian footballer and manager

Personal information
- Date of birth: 24 April 1969 (age 57)
- Place of birth: Pekanbaru, Indonesia
- Position: Defender

Team information
- Current team: Persiba Balikpapan (head coach)

Senior career*
Years	Team	Apps	(Gls)
1988–1996	Arseto Solo		
1996–1997	Bandung Raya		
1997–2000	Persikota Tangerang		
2000–2002	PSPS Pekanbaru		

International career
1991–1997	Indonesia	34	(4)

Managerial career
- 2007–2009: Indonesia (assistant coach)
- 2009–2010: Persija Jakarta (assistant coach)
- 2019: Persija Jakarta (caretaker)
- 2020–2021: Persija Jakarta
- 2021–2022: Persija Jakarta (assistant coach)
- 2022: Persija Jakarta (caretaker)
- 2024: Persiku Kudus
- 2026: Sriwijaya FC (assistant coach)
- 2026–: Persiba Balikpapan
Medal record
Men's football
Representing Indonesia
Southeast Asian Games
Gold medal – first place	1991 Philippines	Team
- * Club domestic league appearances and goals

Sudirman (born 24 April 1969) is an Indonesian football manager and former player who previously plays as defender for Arseto Solo and the Indonesia national team. He is the current head coach of Championship club Persiba Balikpapan.

== Career statistics ==
=== International ===
Sudirman: International goals
No.	Date	Venue	Opponent	Score	Result	Competition
1	1 June 1997	Gelora Bung Karno Stadium, Jakarta, Indonesia	Uzbekistan	1–1	1–1	1998 FIFA World Cup qualification

== Honours ==
=== Player ===
Indonesia

- SEA Games gold medal: 1991

=== Manager ===
Persija Jakarta

- Menpora Cup: 2021

Preceded by Robby Darwis	Indonesian Captain; 1996	Succeeded by Robby Darwis
