= Football at the 1997 SEA Games =

Tournament details
- Host country: Indonesia
- Dates: 5–18 October
- Teams: 10
- Venue(s): Gelora Senayan Stadium; Pajajaran Stadium

Final positions
- Champions: Thailand (8th title)
- Runners-up: Indonesia
- Third place: Vietnam
- Fourth place: Singapore

Tournament statistics
- Matches played: 24
- Goals scored: 79 (3.29 per match)
- Top scorer: (Thailand) Kiatisuk Senamuang (6 goals)

The football tournament at the 1997 SEA Games was held from 5 to 18 October in Jakarta, Indonesia. All 10 Southeast Asian nations competed in the tournament.

== Medal winners ==
Division	Gold	Silver	Bronze
Men's Division	Thailand	Indonesia	Vietnam
Women's Division	Thailand	Myanmar	Vietnam

== Men's tournament ==
=== Participants ===
- Brunei
- Cambodia
- Indonesia
- Laos
- Malaysia
- Myanmar
- Philippines
- Singapore
- Thailand
- Vietnam

=== Group stage ===
==== Group A ====
Team	Pld	W	D	L	GF	GA	GD	Pts
Indonesia	4	3	1	0	13	4	+9	10
Vietnam	4	2	1	1	7	4	+3	7
Laos	4	2	0	2	8	8	0	6
Malaysia	4	2	0	2	5	5	0	6
Philippines	4	0	0	4	1	13	−12	0

5 October 1997
16:00

Indonesia	5–2	Laos
Darwis 20'; Widodo 44', 68'; Kurniawan 54'; Ansyari 69'	Report	Khenkitisack 61'; Somsack 75'

Senayan Stadium, Jakarta
Attendance: 45,000
Referee: Raja Shrestha (Nepal)
5 October 1997
18:15

Vietnam	0–1	Malaysia
	Report	Azmi Mohamed 23'

Senayan Stadium, Jakarta
Referee: Mohammed Mansour (Bangladesh)

7 October 1997
16:00

Malaysia	4–0	Philippines
Azmi Mohamed 8', 34', 68'; Noor 55'	Report (Malay)

Senayan Stadium, Jakarta
7 October 1997
18:15

Indonesia	2–2	Vietnam
Sakti 35'; Kurniawan 65'		Văn Sỹ Hùng 58', 87'

Senayan Stadium, Jakarta
Referee: Santan Nagalingam (Singapore)

9 October 1997
16:00

Indonesia	4–0	Malaysia
Fakhri 20' (pen.), 52' (pen.); Widodo 60'; Kurniawan 69'	Report (Malay)

Senayan Stadium, Jakarta
Referee: Yu Jinyin (China)
9 October 1997
18:15

Laos	4–1	Philippines
Thammavongsa; Channiphone; Fegidero (o.g.) unknown		Maungca

Senayan Stadium, Jakarta

12 October 1997
16:00

Vietnam	2–1	Laos
Vũ Minh Hiếu 6', 75'		Thepsouvanh 4'

Senayan Stadium, Jakarta
12 October 1997
18:15

Indonesia	2–0	Philippines
Uston 25'; Kurniawan 70'

Senayan Stadium, Jakarta
Referee: Thein U Thein (Myanmar)

14 October 1997
16:00

Vietnam	3–0	Philippines
Triệu Quang Hà 27'; Lê Huỳnh Đức; Nguyễn Công Vinh

Senayan Stadium, Jakarta
14 October 1997
18:15

Laos	1–0	Malaysia
Channiphone 89'	Report (Malay)

Senayan Stadium, Jakarta

==== Group B ====
Team	Pld	W	D	L	GF	GA	GD	Pts
Thailand	4	3	1	0	12	1	+11	10
Singapore	4	2	2	0	5	3	+2	8
Cambodia	4	2	0	2	8	7	+1	6
Myanmar	4	1	1	2	10	8	+2	4
Brunei	4	0	0	4	1	17	−16	0

5 October 1997
16:00

Thailand	2–1	Myanmar
Worrawoot; Choketawee	Report	Soe Naing

Lebak Bulus Stadium, Jakarta
Referee: Khaerul Agil (Indonesia)
5 October 1997
18:15

Brunei	0–4	Cambodia
	Report	Sochetra; Samchay; Sovannarith

Lebak Bulus Stadium, Jakarta
Referee: Nguyễn Tuấn Hùng (Vietnam)

7 October 1997
16:00

Brunei	0–6	Thailand
	Report	Tawan 10', 76'; Kiatisuk 32', 63'; Chaichan 56'; Worrawoot 89'

Lebak Bulus Stadium, Jakarta
7 October 1997
18:15

Singapore	2–2	Myanmar
Selvaraj; Khamaruddin		Myo Hlaing Win

Lebak Bulus Stadium, Jakarta

9 October 1997
16:00

Singapore	2–1	Cambodia
Nasir		Sochetra

Lebak Bulus Stadium, Jakarta
9 October 1997
18:15

Brunei	1–6	Myanmar
Said Abdullah		Myo Hlaing Win; Adu Khaing

Lebak Bulus Stadium, Jakarta

12 October 1997
16:00

Singapore	1–0	Brunei
Selvaraj

Lebak Bulus Stadium, Jakarta
12 October 1997
18:15

Thailand	4–0	Cambodia
Kiatisuk 2', 31'; Piyapong 12'; Natipong 59'	Report

Lebak Bulus Stadium, Jakarta

14 October 1997
16:00

Myanmar	1–3	Cambodia
Win Aung		Vuthy; Sochetra

Lebak Bulus Stadium, Jakarta
14 October 1997
18:15

Singapore	0–0	Thailand

Lebak Bulus Stadium, Jakarta

=== Knockout stage ===
Semi-finals
16 October
Thailand	2
Vietnam	1
16 October
Indonesia	2
Singapore	1

Final
18 October
Indonesia	1 (2)
Thailand (pen.)	1 (4)
Third place
18 October
Vietnam	1
Singapore	0

==== Semi-finals ====
16 October 1997
16:00

Thailand	2–1	Vietnam
Kiatisuk 6', 56'		Võ Hoàng Bửu 35' (pen.)

Senayan Stadium, Jakarta
Attendance: 100,000
Referee: Selerajen (Malaysia)

16 October 1997
18:30

Indonesia	2–1	Singapore
Sakti 11'; Fakhri 57'		Fandi 58'

Senayan Stadium, Jakarta
Attendance: 120,000
Referee: Yu Jinyin (China)

==== Bronze medal match ====
18 October 1997
16:00

Vietnam	1–0	Singapore
Nguyễn Phúc Nguyên Chương 89'

Senayan Stadium, Jakarta
Attendance: 50,000

==== Gold medal match ====
18 October 1997
18:30

Indonesia	1–1 (a.e.t.)	Thailand
Kurniawan 48'		Chaichan 30'
Penalties
Santoso (penalty scored); Fakhri (penalty scored); Wabia (penalty missed); Uston (penalty missed)	2–4	(penalty scored) Kiatisuk; (penalty scored) Kritsada; (penalty scored) Tawan; (penalty scored) Dusit

Gelora Senayan Main Stadium, Jakarta
Attendance: 110,000
Referee: Yu Jinyin (China)

=== Winners ===
1997 SEA Games Men's Tournament

Thailand
Eighth title

=== Final ranking ===
Pos	Team	Pld	W	D	L	GF	GA	GD	Pts	Final result
1	Thailand	6	4	2	0	15	3	+12	14	Gold Medal
2	Indonesia (H)	6	4	2	0	16	6	+10	14	Silver Medal
3	Vietnam	6	3	1	2	9	6	+3	10	Bronze Medal
4	Singapore	6	2	2	2	6	6	0	8	Fourth place
5	Cambodia	4	2	0	2	8	7	+1	6	Eliminated in group stage
6	Laos	4	2	0	2	8	8	0	6	Eliminated in group stage
7	Malaysia	4	2	0	2	5	5	0	6	Eliminated in group stage
8	Myanmar	4	1	1	2	10	8	+2	4	Eliminated in group stage
9	Philippines	4	0	0	4	1	13	−12	0	Eliminated in group stage
10	Brunei	4	0	0	4	1	17	−16	0	Eliminated in group stage

(H) Hosts

== Women's tournament ==
=== Participants ===
- Indonesia
- Malaysia
- Myanmar
- Philippines
- Thailand
- Vietnam

=== Group stage ===
==== Group A ====
Team	Pld	W	D	L	GF	GA	GD	Pts
Thailand	2	2	0	0	4	2	+2	6
Vietnam	2	1	0	1	4	3	+1	3
Philippines	2	0	0	2	0	3	−3	0

7 October 1997
16:00

Thailand	3–2	Vietnam

Pajajaran Stadium, Bogor

9 October 1997
18:15

Vietnam	2–0	Philippines

Pajajaran Stadium, Bogor

12 October 1997
16:00

Thailand	1–0	Philippines

Pajajaran Stadium, Bogor

==== Group B ====
Team	Pld	W	D	L	GF	GA	GD	Pts
Myanmar	2	1	1	0	2	1	+1	4
Indonesia	2	0	2	0	2	2	0	2
Malaysia	2	0	1	1	1	2	−1	1

7 October 1997
18:15

Myanmar	1–1	Indonesia

Pajajaran Stadium, Bogor

9 October 1997
16:00

Myanmar	1–0	Malaysia

Pajajaran Stadium, Bogor

12 October 1997
18:15

Indonesia	1–1	Malaysia

Pajajaran Stadium, Bogor

=== Knockout stages ===
Semi-finals
Thailand	2
Indonesia	0
Myanmar	3
Vietnam	2

Final
Thailand	5
Myanmar	1
Third place
Vietnam	2
Indonesia	0

==== Semi-finals ====
14 October 1997
16:00

Thailand	2–0	Indonesia

Pajajaran Stadium, Bogor

14 October 1997
18:15

Myanmar	3–2	Vietnam

Pajajaran Stadium, Bogor

==== Bronze medal match ====
17 October 1997
16:00

Vietnam	2–0	Indonesia

Senayan Stadium, Jakarta

==== Gold medal match ====
17 October 1997
18:00

Thailand	5–1	Myanmar

Senayan Stadium, Jakarta

=== Winners ===
1997 SEA Games Women's Tournament

Thailand
Third title

=== Final ranking ===
Pos	Team	Pld	W	D	L	GF	GA	GD	Pts	Final result
1	Thailand	4	4	0	0	11	3	+8	12	Gold Medal
2	Myanmar	4	2	1	1	6	8	−2	7	Silver Medal
3	Vietnam	4	2	0	2	8	6	+2	6	Bronze Medal
4	Indonesia (H)	4	0	2	2	2	6	−4	2	Fourth place
5	Malaysia	2	0	1	1	1	2	−1	1	Eliminated in group stage
6	Philippines	2	0	0	2	0	3	−3	0	Eliminated in group stage

(H) Hosts
