= Hasnim Haron =

Singaporean footballer

Personal information
- Date of birth: 21 December 1966 (age 59)
- Place of birth: Singapore
- Position: Midfielder

Senior career*
Years	Team	Apps	(Gls)
1987–1989	Singapore FA	33	(4)
1989–1990	Singapore Armed Forces		
1990–1992	Balestier Khalsa		
1993–1996	Johor FA		
1997–1999	Balestier Khalsa		
2000	Home United		
2001–2002	Balestier Khalsa		

International career
1988–1997	Singapore	35	(5)
- * Club domestic league appearances and goals

Hasnim bin Haron (born 21 December 1966) is a Singaporean former footballer who played as a Midfielder.

== Career ==
During his career, Haron played for Singaporean sides and Malaysian side JDT and was regarded as one of the most talented players on the Singapore national football team during the late 1980s to early 1990s and almost signed for Belgian side Lokeren.
