= Sudiat Dali =

Singaporean football midfielder

Personal information
- Date of birth: 20 February 1962 (age 64)
- Place of birth: Singapore
- Position: Defender

Senior career*
Years	Team	Apps	(Gls)
1985–1997	Geylang International FC		
1985–1991	Singapore FA		

International career
1984–1990	Singapore		
- * Club domestic league appearances and goals

Sudiat Dali is a Singaporean former football midfielder who played for Singapore in the 1984 Asian Cup. He also played for Geylang International FC, and Singapore Lions in the Malaysia Cup tournament. He was known in his early career as 'Mike Hammer' (a popular novel and comic book character) for his tough tackling style of defending which also brings him caution or suspension from referees.

He coached the Nanyang Polytechnic football team in the Polytechnic-Institute of Technical Education Championship in 2009. He is currently the coach of Jurong Junior College's football team.
