= Ronnachai Sayomchai =

Thai footballer (born 1966)

Personal information
- Full name: Ronnachai Sayomchai
- Date of birth: 14 September 1966 (age 60)
- Place of birth: Chaiyaphum, Thailand
- Position: Forward

Senior career*
Years	Team	Apps	(Gls)
1985–1986	Thai Port FC		
????–????	Matsushita		
1987–1988	Pahang FA	40	(14)
1988	Mohammedan SC		
1989–1990	Pahang FA		
1990–1999	Thai Port FC		
2000–2007	Sinthana FC		

International career
1987–1998	Thailand		
- * Club domestic league appearances and goals

Ronnachai Sayomchai (Thai: รณชัย สยมชัย; born 14 September 1966) is a Thai retired footballer. He is currently assistant head coach Thai League 1 club of Port. He is a former player of Thai Port F.C., and in 1998 he was the Thai League's top scorer with 23 goals for the season. This record for Thai league stands for 14 years until Teerasil Dangda broke it in 2012 with 25 goals. Ronnachai also played in Malaysia for Pahang FA.

Ronnachai was an international player with Thailand.

== Honours ==
=== Players ===
Pahang

- Malaysian League: 1987

Thailand

- SEA Games

Silver medal: 1991
