= Nguyễn Hồng Phẩm =

Vietnamese footballer

Nguyễn Hồng Phẩm is a Vietnamese former footballer who played as a goalkeeper for the Vietnam national team.

He is a native Ho Chi Minh City, Vietnam.
