= Jurong Stadium =

Sports venue in Jurong, Singapore

- Interactive map of Jurong Stadium
- Full name: Jurong Stadium
- Address: 10 Fourth Chin Bee Road, Singapore 619821
- Location: Jurong, Singapore
- Coordinates: 1°20′00″N 103°43′10″E
- Capacity: 8,000
- Surface: Grass

Construction
- Opened: 1973; 53 years ago
- Closed: February 2020; 6 years ago
- Demolished: March 2020; 6 years ago

Tenants
- SAFFC (1975–2000); Jurong Town (1975– 1996); Sinchi FC (2003–2005)

Jurong Stadium was a multi-purpose stadium in Jurong, Singapore. The stadium held 8,000 people.

== History ==
It was used mostly for football matches and was the home stadium of Sinchi FC in the S.League from 2003 to 2005. Previously, Singapore Armed Forces FC also played their home games in the stadium, before moving to Choa Chu Kang Stadium. In February 2020, Jurong Stadium was fenced up, before being demolished in March.

== International matches ==
Date	Competition	Team 1	Res.	Team 2
26 November 2008	Friendly	Singapore	2–2	Vietnam
