= Terry Pathmanathan =

Singaporean footballer

Personal information
- Full name: Thambiah Pathmanathan
- Date of birth: 9 February 1956 (age 70)
- Place of birth: Singapore
- Position: Defender

Senior career*
Years	Team	Apps	(Gls)
1978–1981	Singapore FA		
1982–1987	Pahang FA		
1988–1992	Singapore FA		
1996	Tampines Rovers		
1997–	Tessensohn Khalsa Rovers		

International career
1979–1992	Singapore	77	

Managerial career
- 1997–: Tessensohn Khalsa Rovers
- 2009–2010: Young Lions
- 2011–2012: Tanjong Pagar United
- * Club domestic league appearances and goals

Thambiah "Terry" Pathmanathan (born 9 February 1956) is a former Singapore international footballer who played as a defender. He played for Singapore and Pahang in the Malaysia Cup. Towards the end of his career, he played for Tampines Rovers in the inaugural S.League season in 1996, retiring from playing professionally in the same year.

== Football career ==
=== Club career ===
He played generally in the role of sweeper, as the last man in defence. He was renowned for his poise on the ball and impeccable reading of the game. He was nicknamed "Captain Marvel", for his leadership qualities, and one of his trademark moves was the long throw-in. Among his national teammates, he was nicknamed "Ganesan's favourite" as one of the privileged ones under N. Ganesan when Ganesan was vice president of Football Association of Singapore.

In 1982, Pathmanathan left Singapore FA to join Pahang FA. In 1983, he won the Malaysia Cup with the team. He played with Pahang till 1987 when his contracts end on 24 April 1988. Pathmanathan then rejoined Singapore FA with the Football Association of Singapore (FAS).

In 1996, Pathmanathan signed with Tampines Rovers FC and became the oldest player in the S.League.

In 1997, Pathmanathan joined National Football League Division 2 club Tessensohn Khalsa Rovers as a player-coach.

=== International career ===
In 1984, Pathmanathan was recalled to the national team for Merlion Cup. He was initially unable to join the team until he was released by Pahang.

== Coaching career ==
Pathmanathan was the head coach for Young Lions from 2009 to 2010, and Tanjong Pagar United from 2011 to 2012.

== Management career ==
In 1982, Pathmanathan worked as a supervisor at a mining company at Pahang and then worked as a marketing executive at a Kuantan Hotel. In 1997, he was an account manager with DNC Advertising.

Pathmanathan is currently a senior manager with the Singapore Sports Council.

== Personal life ==
Pathmanathan was offered Malaysian citizenship by the Sultan of Pahang, Ahmad Shah of Pahang, who was also the President of the Malaysian Football Association (FAM). Pathmanathan took up permanent residency instead.

== Profile and achievements ==
- 1978, Called into national team
- 1981, Finals of Malaysia cup lost to Selangor
- Late 1981 appointed captain of national team until 1992
- 1985, 1989, Silver medalist at Sea games Thailand and Malaysia
- 1985, Merlion Cup Singapore, Joint Champions with Yugoslavia
- 1983, Voted most exciting player in Malaysia, equivalent to footballer of the year
- 1991, Sea games Philippines, Bronze medalist
- 1992, Voted Singapore footballer of the year
- 1990, Finals of Malaysia cup with Singapore squad
- 1992, In the Tiong Bahru squad in the Singapore Premier league
- 1997 to 2004, Player coach for Khalsa and Singapore Recreation club in Singapore Div 1
- 2005, National UNDER 21 Head coach and also assistant coach to young lions
- 2009, National UNDER 23 Head coach and led the team to Laos Sea games. Won the bronze medal with youngest team ever of average age 19yrs.

== Honours ==
Singapore FA

- Malaysian Cup : 1980

Pahang FA

- Malaysian Cup : 1983

Orders and special awards

- Pinak Jasabakti Kerja : 1985

Sporting positions
Preceded by Razali Saad	Singapore national team captain 1989-1992	Succeeded by Fandi Ahmad
