= Sumet Akarapong =

Thai footballer

Personal information
- Full name: Sumet Akarapong
- Date of birth: 6 July 1971 (age 55)
- Place of birth: Thailand
- Height: 1.71 m (5 ft 7 1/2 in)
- Position: Defender

International career
| Years | Team | Apps | (Gls) |
| 1992–1993 | Thailand | 5 | (0) |

Sumet Akarapong (Thai: สุเมธ อัครพงศ์) is a Thai professional footballer who plays as a defender who played for Thailand in the 1992 Asian Cup.
