= Surasak Tungsurat =

Thai footballer

Personal information
- Full name: Surasak Tungsurat
- Date of birth: 1 January 1965 (age 61)
- Place of birth: Thailand
- Height: 1.77 m (5 ft 9 1/2 in)
- Position: Left back

Senior career*
Years	Team	Apps	(Gls)
1989–2001	Rajnavy		

International career
1988–1993	Thailand	20+	(0)

Managerial career
- 2001–2006: Rajnavy
- 2007–2008: Muangthong United
- 2008–2010: Rajnavy Futsal Club
- 2009: Muangthong United (assistant)
- 2011: Suphanburi
- 2012: Nakhon Ratchasima (assistant)
- 2012: Samut Prakan (technical director)
- 2012: Thailand (assistant)
- 2014–2015: Siam Navy
- * Club domestic league appearances and goals

Surasak Tungsurat (Thai: สุรศักดิ์ ตังสุรัตน์) is a Thai professional football manager and former footballer. He was played for Thailand in the 1992 Asian Cup.

== Honours ==
=== Player ===
Thailand

- Sea Games Winner (1); 1993

Runner-Up (1); 1991

=== Manager ===
Muangthong United

- Thai Division 1 League Champions (1); 2008
