= Vithoon Kijmongkolsak =

Thai footballer (born 1962)

Personal information
- Full name: Vithoon Kijmongkolsak
- Date of birth: 21 June 1962 (age 64)
- Place of birth: Nakhon Sawan, Thailand
- Height: 1.80 m (5 ft 11 in)
- Position: Striker

Youth career
- 1981–1985: Nakhon Sawan

Senior career*
Years	Team	Apps	(Gls)
1984	Taworn Farm		
1985	→ Raj Pracha (loan)		
1985–1989	Police United		
1989	Pahang FA	20	(7)
1990–199?	Penang FA		

International career
1985–1995	Thailand	84	(29)

Managerial career
- 2010: Chanthaburi
- 2011: Thailand U23 (assistant)
- * Club domestic league appearances and goals as of 11 August 2011

Vithoon Kijmongkolsak (Thai: วิฑูรย์ กิจมงคลศักดิ์, born 21 June 1962, in Nakhon Sawan) is a Thai retired footballer and former Thailand national team captain. He played for the national team from 1985 to 1995.

== Honours ==
=== Player ===
Pahang FA

- Malaysian League (1) : 1987

Thailand

- King's Cup (2): 1989, 1990
- SEA Games

Gold medal: 1993, 1995
Silver medal: 1991
Bronze medal: 1987
