= Borhan Abu Samah =

Singaporean footballer (1965–1999)

Personal information
- Date of birth: 20 January 1965
- Place of birth: Singapore
- Date of death: 29 October 1999 (aged 34)
- Place of death: Singapore
- Position: Left-back

Youth career
- 1979-87: Mountbatten FC

Senior career*
Years	Team	Apps	(Gls)
1987-91	Singapore FA (Malaysian League)		
1988-89	Tiong Bahru CSC		
1990-91	Geylang International		
1992	Pahang FA (Malaysian League)		
1993	Geylang International		
1994-95	Singapore FA (Malaysian League)		
1996	Woodlands Wellington		
1997	Home United		

International career
1987–1997	Singapore		
- * Club domestic league appearances and goals

Borhan Abu Samah (20 January 1965 – 29 October 1999) was a Singaporean footballer who played for the Singapore national team during the late 1980s till 1990s.

He was a left-back best known for his hard-tackling and "bulldog" style of play, earning himself the nickname of the "Russian Tank". He made his international debut against Indonesia on 4 April 1987. He was part of the Pahang squad which won the Malaysian League and Malaysia Cup double in the 1992 FAM League season. He achieved the double again playing for the Singapore FA in 1994.

Borhan died of liver cancer on 29 October 1999, at the age of 34.
