= Pairote Puangchan =

Thai footballer

Personal information
- Date of birth: 16 December 1966 (age 59)
- Place of birth: Suphan Buri, Thailand
- Position: Defender

Senior career*
Years	Team	Apps	(Gls)
1985–1993	Royal Thai Air Force	49	(5)

International career
1989–1997	Thailand	12	(0)

Managerial career
- 2013: Seeker
- * Club domestic league appearances and goals

Pairote Puangchan (Thai: ไพโรจน์ พ่วงจันทร์; born 16 December 1966) is a Thai retired footballer who played as a defender. He represented Thailand at the 1992 Asian Cup.

== Personal life ==
Pairote has a son, Thitiphan, who is also a national footballer.
