= 1998 AFF Championship squads =

Association football competition squads

Below are the squads for the 1998 AFF Championship, hosted by Vietnam, which took place between 26 August and 5 September 1998. The players' listed age is their age on the tournament's opening day (26 August 1998).

== Group A ==
=== Thailand ===
Coach: Withaya Laohakul

No.	Pos.	Player	Date of birth (age)	Club
1	GK	Kittisak Rawangpa	3 January 1975 (aged 23)	(Football Association of Thailand) Sinthana
2	DF	Kritsada Piandit	2 December 1971 (aged 26)	(Football Association of Thailand) TOT
3	DF	Niweat Siriwong	18 July 1977 (aged 21)	(Football Association of Thailand) Sinthana
4	DF	Klairung Treejaksung	20 April 1973 (aged 25)	(Football Association of Thailand) Bangkok Bank FC
5	DF	Choketawee Promrut	16 March 1975 (aged 23)	(Football Association of Thailand) Thai Farmers Bank
6	DF	Sanor Longsawang	2 December 1971 (aged 26)	(Football Association of Thailand) Thai Farmers Bank
7	DF	Natee Thongsookkaew (c)	9 December 1966 (aged 31)	(Football Association of Thailand) Royal Thai Police
8	MF	Therdsak Chaiman	29 September 1973 (aged 24)	(Football Association of Thailand) Rajnavy
12	MF	Surachai Jaturapattarapong	20 November 1969 (aged 28)	(Football Association of Thailand) Stock Exchange of Thailand
14	FW	Anan Punsanai	10 August 1966 (aged 32)	(Football Association of Thailand) Sinthana
15	FW	Chaichan Kiewsen	6 May 1977 (aged 21)	(Football Association of Thailand) Rajnavy
16	DF	Surachai Jirasirichote	13 October 1970 (aged 27)	(Football Association of Thailand) Sinthana
19	FW	Worrawoot Srimaka	8 December 1971 (aged 26)	(Football Association of Thailand) BEC Tero Sasana
21	MF	Kovid Foythong	20 April 1974 (aged 24)	(German Football Association) SV Lohhof
22	GK	Sarawut Kambua	21 July 1972 (aged 26)	(Football Association of Thailand) Krung Thai Bank
25	MF	Songserm Maperm	12 March 1966 (aged 32)	(Football Association of Thailand) Royal Thai Airforce
26	FW	Ronnachai Sayomchai	14 September 1966 (aged 31)	(Football Association of Thailand) Thai port
28	MF	Sunei Jaidee	22 May 1976 (aged 22)	(Football Association of Thailand) Royal Thai Airforce

=== Indonesia ===
Coach: Rusdy Bahalwan

No.	Pos.	Player	Date of birth (age)	Club
1	GK	Kurnia Sandy	24 August 1975 (aged 23)	(Football Association of Indonesia) Pelita Bakrie
2	DF	Anang Ma'ruf	18 May 1976 (aged 22)	(Football Association of Indonesia) Persebaya Surabaya
3	DF	Aji Santoso	6 April 1970 (aged 28)	(Football Association of Indonesia) Persebaya Surabaya
4	DF	Mursyid Effendi	23 April 1972 (aged 26)	(Football Association of Indonesia) Persebaya Surabaya
5	DF	Bejo Sugiantoro	2 April 1977 (aged 21)	(Football Association of Indonesia) Persebaya Surabaya
6	DF	Hartono	18 March 1970 (aged 28)	(Football Association of Indonesia) Persebaya Surabaya
7	FW	Widodo Putro	8 November 1970 (aged 27)	(Football Association of Indonesia) Persija Jakarta
8	MF	Imam Riyadi	7 December 1974 (aged 23)	(Football Association of Indonesia) Persib Bandung
9	FW	Miro Baldo Bento	4 June 1975 (aged 23)	(Football Association of Indonesia) Persija Jakarta
10	FW	Kurniawan Dwi Yulianto	13 July 1976 (aged 22)	(Football Association of Indonesia) Pelita Bakrie
11	MF	Bima Sakti	23 January 1976 (aged 22)	(Football Association of Indonesia) Pelita Bakrie
12	DF	Alexander Pulalo	8 May 1973 (aged 25)	(Football Association of Indonesia) Pelita Bakrie
13	MF	Kuncoro	7 March 1973 (aged 25)	(Football Association of Indonesia) Mitra Surabaya
14	MF	Eri Irianto	12 January 1974 (aged 24)	(Football Association of Indonesia) Persebaya Surabaya
15	MF	Uston Nawawi	6 September 1977 (aged 20)	(Football Association of Indonesia) Persebaya Surabaya
16	FW	Yusuf Ekodono	16 April 1967 (aged 31)	(Football Association of Indonesia) Persebaya Surabaya
17	DF	Khairil Anwar Ohorella	28 October 1974 (aged 23)	(Football Association of Indonesia) Persebaya Surabaya
18	MF	Jatmiko	28 February 1975 (aged 23)	(Football Association of Indonesia) Persebaya Surabaya
19	DF	Nur'alim	27 December 1973 (aged 24)	(Football Association of Indonesia) Persija Jakarta
20	GK	Hendro Kartiko	24 April 1973 (aged 25)	(Football Association of Indonesia) Persebaya Surabaya
21	FW	Rochy Putiray	26 June 1970 (aged 28)	(Football Association of Indonesia) Persija Jakarta
22	GK	Muhammad Halim		(Football Association of Indonesia) PSMS Medan

=== Myanmar ===
Coach: Aye Maung

No.	Pos.	Player	Date of birth (age)	Club
1	GK	San Htwe	27 September 1969 (aged 28)	(Myanmar Football Federation)
2	DF	Min Thu	2 June 1979 (aged 19)	(Myanmar Football Federation) Ministry of Commerce FC
3	DF	Min Min Aung	8 January 1977 (aged 21)	(Myanmar Football Federation) Finance and Revenue
4	DF	San Lwin	24 January 1973 (aged 25)	(Myanmar Football Federation)
5	DF	Thet Khine	1971	(Myanmar Football Federation)
6	MF	Maung Maung Gyi	1 August 1971 (aged 27)	(Myanmar Football Federation)
7	DF	Tun Tun Soe	1967	(Myanmar Football Federation)
8	MF	Maung Maung Htay	4 March 1976 (aged 22)	(Myanmar Football Federation)
9	FW	Myo Hlaing Win (c)	26 July 1973 (aged 25)	(Myanmar Football Federation) Finance and Revenue
10	FW	Aung Khine	29 August 1973 (aged 24)	(Myanmar Football Federation)
11	MF	Myint Htwe		(Myanmar Football Federation)
12	MF	Maung Than	6 April 1973 (aged 25)	(Myanmar Football Federation)
13	MF	Zaw Bar	1970	(Myanmar Football Federation)
14	FW	Soe Myat Min	19 July 1982 (aged 16)	(Myanmar Football Federation) Finance and Revenue
15	DF	Moe Kyaw Thu	27 July 1979 (aged 19)	(Myanmar Football Federation)
16	FW	Win Htike	24 May 1982 (aged 16)	(Myanmar Football Federation)
17	DF	Myat Min Oo	3 January 1979 (aged 19)	(Myanmar Football Federation)
18	GK	Zaw Myo Latt	3 July 1979 (aged 19)	(Myanmar Football Federation)
19		Tun Nadar Oo	1983	(Myanmar Football Federation)
20	DF	Zaw Lin Tun	20 October 1982 (aged 15)	(Myanmar Football Federation)
21	MF	Tint Naing Tun Thein	22 May 1983 (aged 15)	(Myanmar Football Federation)
22	GK	Myat Than Oo	1975	(Myanmar Football Federation)

=== Philippines ===
Coach: (Spain) Juan Cutillas

No.	Pos.	Player	Date of birth (age)	Caps	Club
	GK	Melo Sabacan	10 May 1969 (aged 29)		(Philippines)
	GK	Edmundo Mercado	7 June 1974 (aged 24)		(Philippines)
	DF	Raymund Tonog	9 May 1971 (aged 27)		(Philippines) Philippine Air Force
	DF	Ziggy Tonog	16 July 1976 (aged 22)		(Philippines) Philippine Air Force
	DF	Gil Talavera	7 December 1972 (aged 25)		(Philippines)
	DF	Loreto Kalalang	24 August 1974 (aged 24)		(Philippines) Philippine Navy
	DF	Judy Suluria	11 December 1970 (aged 27)		(Philippines)
	MF	Troy Fegidero	27 October 1975 (aged 22)		(Philippines)
	MF	Norman Fegidero	28 January 1970 (aged 28)		(Philippines) Philippine Air Force
	MF	Marlon Piñero	10 January 1972 (aged 26)		(Philippines)
	FW	Freddy Gonzalez	1 October 1978 (aged 19)		(Philippines) Colegio de San Agustin
	FW	Yanti Barsales	6 February 1973 (aged 25)		(Philippines) Philippine Air Force
	DF	Florante Altivo	11 July 1971 (aged 27)		(Philippines)
	MF	Jeofrey Lobaton	10 September 1975 (aged 22)		(Philippines) Philippine Army
	FW	Vicente Rosell	4 July 1967 (aged 31)		(Philippines)
	MF	Randy Valbuena			(Philippines)
	MF	Lyndon Zamora	1966		(Philippines)

== Group B ==
=== Singapore ===
Coach: (England) Barry Whitbread

No.	Pos.	Player	Date of birth (age)	Club
1	GK	Rezal Hassan	14 February 1975 (aged 23)	(Football Association of Singapore) Singapore Armed Forces
2	DF	Dzulkifli Jumadi	15 November 1975 (aged 22)	(Football Association of Singapore)
3	MF	Rafi Ali	11 December 1972 (aged 25)	(Football Association of Singapore) Geylang United
4	DF	Aide Iskandar	28 May 1975 (aged 23)	(Football Association of Singapore) Home United
5	DF	Shunmugham Subramani	5 August 1972 (aged 26)	(Football Association of Singapore) Tanjong Pagar United
7	MF	Samawira Basri	2 September 1972 (aged 25)	(Football Association of Singapore) Tanjong Pagar United
9	FW	Ahmad Latiff	29 May 1979 (aged 19)	(Football Association of Singapore) Geylang United
10	MF	Basri Halis	24 November 1975 (aged 22)	(Football Association of Singapore) Tanjong Pagar United
11	MF	Hafizat Jauharmi	18 February 1976 (aged 22)	(Football Association of Singapore)
12	MF	Zulkarnaen Zainal	1 October 1973 (aged 24)	(Football Association of Singapore) Geylang United
13	MF	Ramu Sasikumar	15 March 1975 (aged 23)	(Football Association of Singapore) Home United
14	DF	Lim Soon Seng	2 December 1976 (aged 21)	(Football Association of Singapore) Tanjong Pagar United
15	DF	Nazri Nasir (c)	17 January 1971 (aged 27)	(Football Association of Singapore) Singapore Armed Forces
16	DF	Kadir Yahaya	15 February 1968 (aged 30)	(Football Association of Singapore) Geylang International
17	DF	Mohd Noor Ali	16 May 1975 (aged 23)	(Football Association of Singapore) Tampines Rovers
18	FW	Nahar Daud	21 September 1969 (aged 28)	(Football Association of Singapore)
19	MF	Gusta Guzarishah	29 April 1976 (aged 22)	(Football Association of Singapore)
22	GK	Bashir Khan	20 September 1969 (aged 28)	(Football Association of Singapore)
23	FW	Joseph Pragasam	30 January 1974 (aged 24)	(Football Association of Singapore)
28	MF	Rudy Khairon Daiman	4 July 1973 (aged 25)	(Football Association of Singapore) Tanjong Pagar United

=== Vietnam ===
Coach: (Austria) Alfred Riedl

No.	Pos.	Player	Date of birth (age)	Club
1	GK	Trần Tiến Anh	12 August 1972 (aged 26)	(Vietnam Football Federation) Thể Công
3	DF	Nguyễn Thiện Quang	13 March 1970 (aged 28)	(Vietnam Football Federation) Công An Hồ Chí Minh City
4	DF	Nguyễn Hữu Thắng (c)	2 December 1972 (aged 25)	(Vietnam Football Federation) Sông Lam Nghệ An
5	DF	Đỗ Mạnh Dũng	6 January 1970 (aged 28)	(Vietnam Football Federation) Thể Công
6	DF	Nguyễn Đức Thắng	28 May 1976 (aged 22)	(Vietnam Football Federation) Thể Công
7	DF	Đỗ Văn Khải	1 April 1974 (aged 24)	(Vietnam Football Federation) Hải Quan
8	MF	Nguyễn Hồng Sơn	9 October 1970 (aged 27)	(Vietnam Football Federation) Thể Công
9	FW	Văn Sỹ Hùng	1 September 1970 (aged 27)	(Vietnam Football Federation) Sông Lam Nghệ An
10	FW	Lê Huỳnh Đức	20 April 1972 (aged 26)	(Vietnam Football Federation) Công An Hồ Chí Minh City
11	MF	Nguyễn Văn Sỹ	21 November 1971 (aged 26)	(Vietnam Football Federation) Nam Định
12	GK	Nguyễn Văn Phụng	12 February 1968 (aged 30)	(Vietnam Football Federation) Cảng Sài Gòn
14	FW	Nguyễn Văn Dũng	23 November 1963 (aged 34)	(Vietnam Football Federation) Nam Định
15	MF	Phùng Thanh Phương	30 March 1978 (aged 20)	(Vietnam Football Federation) Công An Hồ Chí Minh City
17	MF	Triệu Quang Hà	3 September 1975 (aged 22)	(Vietnam Football Federation) Thể Công
18	MF	Vũ Minh Hiếu	11 June 1972 (aged 26)	(Vietnam Football Federation) Công An Hà Nội
19	MF	Trương Việt Hoàng	9 December 1975 (aged 22)	(Vietnam Football Federation) Thể Công
20	DF	Trần Công Minh	1 September 1970 (aged 27)	(Vietnam Football Federation) Đồng Tháp
24	FW	Nguyễn Tuấn Thành	26 September 1975 (aged 22)	(Vietnam Football Federation) Công An Hà Nội

=== Malaysia ===
Coach: (Tunisia) Hatem Souisi

No.	Pos.	Player	Date of birth (age)	Caps	Club
	GK	Azmin Azram Abdul Aziz	1 April 1976 (aged 22)		(Malaysia) Kuala Lumpur FA
	GK	Jamsari Sabian	8 September 1978 (aged 19)		(Malaysia)
	GK	Kamarulzaman Hassan	17 January 1979 (aged 19)		(Malaysia) Penang FA
	GK	Mohd Sany Muhammad Fahmi	13 August 1978 (aged 20)		(Malaysia) Johor FA
	DF	Yuzaiman Zahari	19 October 1978 (aged 19)		(Malaysia)
	DF	Chow Chee Weng	21 May 1977 (aged 21)		(Malaysia) Olympic 2000
	DF	Jalaluddin Jaafar	1 January 1975 (aged 23)		(Malaysia) Pahang FA
	DF	Abdul Ghani Malik	25 May 1972 (aged 26)		(Malaysia) Kuala Lumpur FA
	DF	Vijayan Thinagaran	1972		(Malaysia) Perlis FA
	MF	Dass Gregory Kolopis	1 February 1977 (aged 21)		(Malaysia) Olympic 2000
	MF	Tengku Hazman Raja Hassan	6 March 1977 (aged 21)		(Malaysia) Olympic 2000
	MF	Kalasigaram Sanbagamaran	19 February 1972 (aged 26)		(Malaysia) Selangor FA
	DF	Mohd Khairun Haled Masrom	4 June 1977 (aged 21)		(Malaysia) Olympic 2000
	MF	Gopalan Mujappan	29 August 1977 (aged 20)		(Malaysia)
	MF	Roslee Md Derus			(Malaysia)
	MF	Nik Ahmad Fadly Nik Leh	28 May 1977 (aged 21)		(Malaysia) Olympic 2000
	MF	Moey Kok Hong	11 November 1968 (aged 29)		(Malaysia) Penang FA
	FW	Muhamad Khalid Jamlus	23 February 1977 (aged 21)		(Malaysia) Olympic 2000
	FW	Mior Nor Samsul Kamal			(Malaysia) Kuala Lumpur FA
	FW	Azmi Mohamad	25 August 1971 (aged 27)		(Malaysia) Johor FA
	DF	Jaya Prakash Supramaniam	24 February 1979 (aged 19)		(Malaysia)
	FW	Mohd Rafdi Abdul Rashid	21 January 1977 (aged 21)	0	(Malaysia) Kedah FA
	DF	Johnny Joseph	11 November 1978 (aged 19)		(Malaysia) Olympic 2000

=== Laos ===
Head coach: Songphu Phongsa

No.	Pos.	Player	Date of birth (age)	Caps	Club
1	GK	Soulivanh Xenvilay	14 March 1963 (aged 35)		(Laos)
2	DF	Khamsay Chantavong	28 March 1972 (aged 26)		(Laos)
3	DF	Phonepadith Xayavong	1 March 1972 (aged 26)		(Laos)
4	DF	Vilayphone Xayavong	4 September 1973 (aged 24)		(Laos)
5	MF	Chalana Luang-Amath	10 May 1972 (aged 26)		(Laos) Lao Army FC
6	MF	Kholadeth Phonephachan	20 October 1980 (aged 17)		(Laos)
7	MF	Khanthilath Phalangthong	1973		(Laos)
8	MF	Bounmy Thamavongsa	22 December 1971 (aged 26)		(Laos)
9	FW	Bounlap Khenkitisack	19 June 1966 (aged 32)		(Laos)
10	MF	Bousokvanh Bounlanh			(Laos)
11	MF	Sonesavanh Insisengway	28 June 1969 (aged 29)		(Laos)
12	DF	Keodala Somsack	15 September 1966 (aged 31)		(Laos)
13	FW	Keolakhone Channiphone	10 January 1970 (aged 28)		(Laos)
14		Lovankham Maykhen			(Laos)
15	MF	Khonesavanh Homsombath	23 October 1972 (aged 25)		(Laos)
16	FW	Soubinh Keophet	20 January 1981 (aged 17)		(Laos)
17	GK	Douangdala Somsack	24 April 1980 (aged 18)		(Laos)
18	DF	Ananh Thepsouvanh	21 October 1981 (aged 16)		(Laos)
