= Singapore national football team results (1990–1999) =

Football statistics

- Win Draw Loss

This article provides details of international football games played by the Singapore national football team from 1990 to 1999.

== Acronyms ==
Acronyms	Full Name
WC	FIFA World Cup
AFC	Asian Football Federation
AFF	ASEAN Football Federation
Q	Qualification rounds
PO	Play-off round
GS	Group stage
R32	Round of 32
R16	Round of 16
QF	Quarter-finals
SF	Semi-finals
3rd PO	Third place match/play-off
F	Final

== Results ==
=== 1990 ===
18 August 1990 Friendly tournament	Indonesia	6–0	Singapore	Indonesia

13 September 1990 Friendly	Singapore	3–0	Malaysia	Singapore

23 September 1990 1990 Asian Games	South Korea	7–0	Singapore	Beijing, China
	Hong Myung-bo 10' (pen.); Kim Joo-sung 48', 59'; Ko Jeong-woon 51', 61'; Seo Jung-won 58', 62'			Stadium: Xiannongtan Stadium

25 September 1990 1990 Asian Games	Singapore	1–5	China	Beijing, China
	Haron 31'		Xie Yuxin 14'; Mai Chao 50'; Wu Qunli 55'; Liu Haiguang 60', 88'	Stadium: Fengtai Stadium

27 September 1990 1990 Asian Games	Singapore	6–1	Pakistan	Beijing, China
	Tokijan 15'; Ahmad 17'; Sundramoorthy 31', 42', 62'; Noor 78'		Sharafat 35'	Stadium: Xiannongtan Stadium

=== 1991 ===
5 October 1991 Friendly	Singapore	2–0	Indonesia	Singapore

25 November 1991 1991 Southeast Asian Games	Singapore	0–0	Thailand	Manila, Philippines
				Stadium: Rizal Memorial Stadium

29 November 1991 1991 Southeast Asian Games	Singapore	2–1	Myanmar	Manila, Philippines
	Fandi Ahmad 21', 54'			Stadium: Rizal Memorial Stadium

2 December 1991 1991 Southeast Asian Games	Indonesia	0–0 (4–2 (Note: RSSSF reports the penalty shootout as 4–2 to Indonesia. The ASEAN Football Federation reports it as 4–3 to Indonesia.) p)	Singapore	Manila, Philippines
				Stadium: Rizal Memorial Stadium

4 December 1991 1991 Southeast Asian Games	Philippines	0–2	Singapore	Manila, Philippines
				Stadium: Rizal Memorial Stadium

=== 1992 ===
19 April 1992	Singapore	1–1	Malaysia

22 April 1992	Singapore	1–2	Indonesia

26 April 1992	Singapore	0–1	China

8 December 1992 Merlion Tournament	Singapore	3–0	Malaysia

=== 1993 ===
5 February 1993 Merdeka Tournament	Malaysia	2–1	Singapore	Kuala Lumpur, Malaysia

7 February 1993 Merdeka Tournament	Singapore	0–2	(Bulgaria) CSKA Sofia	Kuala Lumpur, Malaysia

9 February 1993 Merdeka Tournament	Singapore	1–1	Thailand	Kuala Lumpur, Malaysia

11 April 1993 1994 World Cup qualification	North Korea	2–1	Singapore

13 April 1993 1994 World Cup qualification	Singapore	3–2	Vietnam

16 April 1993 1994 World Cup qualification	Qatar	4–1	Singapore

18 April 1993 1994 World Cup qualification	Singapore	2–0	Indonesia

22 April 1993 Friendly	Singapore	0–3	Saudi Arabia

26 April 1993 1994 World Cup qualification	Singapore	1–3	North Korea

28 April 1993 1994 World Cup qualification	Singapore	1–0	Vietnam

30 April 1993 1994 World Cup qualification	Singapore	1–0	Qatar

2 May 1993 1994 World Cup qualification	Singapore	2–1	Indonesia

9 June 1993 1993 Southeast Asian Games	Singapore	7–0	Philippines	Singapore
	Steven Tan 21' (pen.); Fandi Ahmad 33', 58', 73', 76'; Malek Awab 41'; Rafi Ali 52'			Stadium: National Stadium; Referee: Nasaruddin Shariff

11 June 1993 1993 Southeast Asian Games	Singapore	1–1	Indonesia	Singapore
	V. Sundramoorthy 28'		Herry Setiawan 27'

15 June 1993 1993 Southeast Asian Games	Singapore	2–0	Vietnam	Singapore
	Ahmed Ahmad 4'; Hassan Bora 87'

17 June 1993 1993 Southeast Asian Games	Singapore	3–3 (4–5 p)	Myanmar	Singapore
	Steven Tan 5', 53'; Fandi Ahmad 23'		Lim Tong Hai(OG) 7', 50'; Win Aung; 90+5'

19 June 1993 1993 Southeast Asian Games	Singapore	3–1	Indonesia	Singapore
	Fandi Ahmad 4', 7'; Stephen Ng Heng Seng 43'		Yahya Madon 55' (o.g.)

=== 1995 ===
21 February 1995 Friendly	New Zealand	3–0	Singapore	Mount Maunganui, New Zealand

17 July 1995 Friendly tournament	Singapore	3–3	Myanmar	Singapore

1 August 1995 Friendly	Indonesia	0–0	Singapore	Jakarta, Indonesia

4 December 1995	Brunei	2–2	Singapore

6 December 1995	Singapore	4–2	Myanmar

8 December 1995	Singapore	4–0	Philippines

10 December 1995	Laos	0–0	Singapore

14 December 1995	Thailand	1–0	Singapore

16 December 1995	Singapore	1–0	Myanmar

=== 1996 ===
27 June 1996	Singapore	4–0	Myanmar

29 June 1996	Singapore	2–0	Maldives

1 July 1996	Thailand	1–1	Singapore

4 July 1996	Singapore	2–2	Myanmar

7 July 1996	Singapore	5–2	Maldives

9 July 1996	Singapore	2–2	Thailand

2 September 1996	Singapore	1–1	Malaysia

4 September 1996	Singapore	3–0	Brunei

6 September 1996	Singapore	3–0	Philippines

10 September 1996	Singapore	0–1	Thailand

=== 1997 ===
21 February 1997 Dunhill Cup 1997	China	3–1	Singapore	Kuala Lumpur, Malaysia

23 February 1997 Dunhill Cup 1997	Malaysia	0–0	Singapore	Kuala Lumpur, Malaysia

25 February 1997 Dunhill Cup 1997	Finland	1–0	Singapore	Kuala Lumpur, Malaysia

13 April 1997	Lebanon	1–1	Singapore

26 April 1997	Singapore	0–1	Kuwait

24 May 1997	Singapore	1–2	Lebanon

5 June 1997	Kuwait	4–0	Singapore

7 October 1997	Myanmar	2–2	Singapore

9 October 1997	Singapore	2–1	Cambodia

12 October 1997	Singapore	1–0	Brunei

14 October 1997	Singapore	0–0	Thailand

16 October 1997	Indonesia	2–1	Singapore

18 October 1997	Vietnam	1–0	Singapore

=== 1998 ===
24 March 1998 1998 AFF Championship qualification	Singapore	1–0	Philippines	Singapore

28 March 1998 1998 AFF Championship qualification	Singapore	3–0	Cambodia	Singapore

26 August 1998 1998 AFF Championship	Singapore	2–0	Malaysia	Vietnam

28 August 1998 1998 AFF Championship	Vietnam	0–0	Singapore	Vietnam

30 August 1998 1998 AFF Championship	Singapore	4–1	Laos	Vietnam

2 September 1998 1998 AFF Championship	Singapore	2–1	Indonesia	Vietnam

5 September 1998 1998 AFF Championship	Vietnam	0–1	Singapore	Vietnam

25 November 1998 Friendly	Singapore	0–4	United Arab Emirates	Singapore

=== 1999 ===
29 January 1999 1999 Dunhill Cup	Vietnam	1–0	Singapore	Vietnam

31 January 1999 1999 Dunhill Cup	Singapore	0–5	Iran	Vietnam

2 February 1999 1999 Dunhill Cup	Singapore	1–1	Russia	Vietnam

29 June 1999 Friendly	Singapore	0–1	New Zealand	Singapore

31 July 1999 1999 SEA Games	Singapore	2–1	Malaysia	Bandar Seri Begawan, Brunei

4 August 1999 1999 SEA Games	Brunei	1–3	Singapore	Bandar Seri Begawan, Brunei

6 August 1999 1999 SEA Games	Indonesia	1–1	Singapore	Bandar Seri Begawan, Brunei

9 August 1999 1999 SEA Games	Singapore	2–0	Cambodia	Bandar Seri Begawan, Brunei

12 August 1999 1999 SEA Games	Thailand	2–0	Singapore	Bandar Seri Begawan, Brunei

14 August 1999 1999 SEA Games	Indonesia	0–0	Singapore	Bandar Seri Begawan, Brunei

28 December 1999 Friendly	Malaysia	1–0	Singapore	United Arab Emirates
