= Singapore national football team results (unofficial matches) =

Football statistics

- Win Draw Loss

This article provides details of football games played by the Singapore national football team that, for various reasons, are not accorded the status of official International A Matches.

== Acronyms ==
Acronyms	Full Name
GS	Group stage
R32	Round of 32
R16	Round of 16
QF	Quarter-finals
SF	Semi-finals
3rd PO	Third place match/play-off
F	Final

== Results ==
=== 1963 ===
20 November 1963 Friendly	Hong Kong	3–4	Singapore	Hong Kong

=== 1964 ===
3 March 1964 Friendly	Singapore	1–2	Japan	Singapore

4 July 1964 Friendly	Singapore	1–1	Hong Kong	Singapore

6 July 1964 Friendly	Singapore	2–1	Hong Kong	Singapore

=== 1965 ===
25 March 1965 Friendly	Singapore	1–4	Japan	Singapore

=== 1997 ===
18 September Friendly	Perth Glory	5-1	Singapore	Perth, Australia
--:-- UTC+8	Strudwick 25', 85'; Miller 31'; Scott Halpin 75'; Bretovac 88'	Report	Dalis Supait 48'	Stadium: Kiev Sports Ground; Attendance: 400; Referee: Eddie Lennie (Australia)

21 September Friendly	Western Australia	2-0	Singapore	Perth, Australia
--:-- UTC+8	Ithier; MacKenzie			Attendance: 3,500
Note: Western Australia is an Australian regional selection.

23 September Friendly	Floreat Athena	1-2	Singapore	Perth, Australia
18:30 UTC+8	(pen.)	Report	Latiff	Stadium: Veledrome Stadium

26 September Friendly	Perth President's XI	2-5	Singapore	Perth, Australia
18:00 UTC+8	Goal	Report	Nazri 12'; Latiff 22', 36', 76'; Rudy 65'	Stadium: Inglewood Stadium
Note: Perth President's XI might be represented by Inglewood FC.

=== 1999 ===
20 June Friendly	Singapore	0-5	Australia U23	Bishan, Singapore
19:30 UTC+9		Report	Emerton 22'; Wehrman 44'; Curcija 52', 75'; Zane 53'	Stadium: Bishan Stadium; Attendance: 3,500
Note: The Under-23 boys are from Australian pre-Olympic team.

19 April Friendly	China Pre-Olympic	1-0	Singapore	Shanghai, China
--:-- UTC+9	Li Yan 20'	Report		Stadium: Shanghai Stadium

5 July Friendly	Sony Sendai	0-2	Singapore	Sendai, Japan
--:-- UTC+9		Report	Gusta 16'; Noor Ali 59'	Stadium: J-Village Stadium

6 July Friendly	Fukushima Prefecture	1-2	Singapore	Fukushima, Japan
--:-- UTC+9	Inaba 87'	Report	Zulkarnaen 7'; Hafizat 60'	Stadium: J-Village Stadium
Note: Fukushima Prefecture team was a state selection team.

7 July Friendly	Kashima Antlers	4-0	Singapore	Fukushima, Japan
16:00 UTC+9	Narahashi; Yanagisawa 65'; Ribeiro	Report		Stadium: J-Village Stadium

9 July Friendly	Kashiwa Reysol	6-0	Singapore	Fukushima, Japan
17:00 UTC+9	Ono 13'; Hasegawa 18'; Sakai 20'; Kitajima 62', 78'; Tamada 85'	Report		Stadium: Kashiwa Stadium; Attendance: 500

12 July Friendly	Singapore	0-4	Deportes Puerto Montt	Bishan, Singapore
19:30 UTC+9		Report	Quiroga 26'; Madrid 29', 71'; Barra 60'	Stadium: Bishan Stadium; Attendance: 1,200
Note: Ole Ole Ole tournament

19 July Friendly	Singapore	0-4	Deportivo Toluca	Bishan, Singapore
19:30 UTC+9		Report	Villazón 5'; Morales 7', 13'; Ruiz (red card) 76'; Lillingston 82'	Stadium: Bishan Stadium; Attendance: 2,000
Note: Ole Ole Ole tournament

=== 2000 ===
17 October Friendly	Canberra Cosmos	3-1	Singapore	Canberra, Australia
19:30 UTC+8	Angelucci 10'; Castro 29'; Camara 78'	Report	Ahmad Latiff 82'	Stadium: Australian Institute of Sport
Note: Australia training tour

20 October Friendly	Blacktown City	3-3	Singapore	Sydney, Australia
--:-- UTC+10	Brown 58'; Shu Shu 70'; Metosky 80'	Report	Nazri 63'; Ahmad Latiff 75', 85'	Stadium: Gabbie Stadium
Note: Australia training tour

22 October Friendly	Leichhardt Tigers	0-1	Singapore	Sydney, Australia
--:-- UTC+10		Report	Indra Sahdan 49'	Stadium: Leichhardt Oval
Note: Australia training tour

=== 2001 ===
16 January Friendly	Al-Nasr SC	3-1	Singapore	Dubai, UAE
--:-- UTC+4	Mohd Ibrahim 20'; Qasi Adam 30'; Mohd Hakeem	Report	Nazri	Stadium: Al Maktoum Stadium
Note: Al-Nasr replaced Turkmenistan for a match within a short notice.

19 January Friendly	Singapore	0-2	FC Energie Cottbus	Dubai, UAE
--:-- UTC+4			Micevski 12'; Bittencourt 34'

20 January Friendly	Al-Ahli	1-2	Singapore	Dubai, UAE
--:-- UTC+4	30'	Report	Hafizat 10'; Rudy 65'	Stadium: Al Ahli Stadium

22 January Friendly	Neftekhimik Nizhnekamsk	3-0	Singapore	Dubai, UAE
--:-- UTC+4	27'	Report
Note: 3-0 at Half-time

31 January Friendly	Singapore	0-6	Brondby IF	Singapore
--:-- UTC+8		Report	Graulund; Barro; Lindrup (pen.); Nordin	Stadium: Tampines Stadium; Referee: S K Kennedy (Singapore))

14 February Friendly	Singapore	3-0	Marine Castle Utd	Singapore
17:00 UTC+8	Nazri 16', 37'; Fadzuhasny 73'	Report		Stadium: National Stadium

=== 2002 ===
28 November Friendly	Abu Dhabi GDSA	2–1	Singapore	Abu Dhabi, UAE
	Said Ibrahim 25'; Mohammed Nasrullah 40'	Report	Nazri Nasir 48'	Stadium: Sultan bin Zayed Stadium
Note: UAE Independence Tournament / Devotion for the President Tournament 2002 / United Arab Emirates tour

=== 2003 ===
28 July Training match	Singapore	4-0	Singapore U23	Jalan Besar, Singapore
--:-- UTC+8	Alam Shah; Fadzuhasny; Indra Sahdan			Stadium: Jalan Besar Stadium
Note: The match consisted of two halves of only 40 minutes.

19 August Friendly	Singapore	0-1	Japan Olympic (U22)	Jalan Besar, Singapore
19:30 UTC+8		Report	Myojin 27'	Stadium: Jalan Besar Stadium; Attendance: 5,500
Note: Tiger Beer Challenge Trophy

28 August Friendly	Perth Glory	3-2	Singapore	Perth, Australia
--:-- UTC+8	Caceres 51', 71'; Pondeljak 65'	Report	Grabovac 90'; Goncalves 11'	Stadium: Waroona Town Oval

30 August Friendly	Perth Glory	1-0	Singapore	Mandurah, Australia
--:-- UTC+8	Mrdja 44'			Stadium: Peelwood Parade Reserve; Attendance: 2,500

=== 2004 ===
31 January Friendly	Singapore	2-3	Iran Olympic (U23)	Jalan Besar, Singapore
17:00 UTC+8	Indra Sahdan 50'; Tan 59'	Report	Mehrzad Ardakani 30'; Hossein Kabei 35', 78'	Stadium: Jalan Besar Stadium

=== 2010 ===
18 August Friendly	Serbia XI	1-0	Singapore	Kragujevac, Serbia
--:-- UTC+8	62'	Report		Stadium: Stadion Cika Daca

23 August Friendly	FK Vojvodina Novi Sad	1-0	Singapore	Novi Sad, Serbia
--:-- UTC+8	Damir 71'	Report		Stadium: Stadion FK Karadjordje

25 August Friendly	FK Jagodina	2-2	Singapore	Jagodina, Serbia
--:-- UTC+8	Dordevic 15'; Denic 90+'	Report	Baihakki 53'; Hariss 56'	Stadium: Stadion FK Jagodina

13 November Friendly	Singapore	2-0	Albirex Niigata (S)	Jurong East, Singapore
17:00 UTC+8		Report		Stadium: Jurong East Stadium

=== 2011 ===
24 August Friendly	Thailand	0–0	Singapore	Bangkok, Thailand
18:00 UTC+7				Stadium: Rajamangala Stadium; Referee: (Thailand)
Note: All match officials are from Thailand. More than six substitutions made.

=== 2014 ===
2 June Friendly	France U21	6-0	Singapore	Saint-Pierre, Réunion Island
21:00 UTC+4	Umtiti 21'; Ntep 23', 36'; Coman 44'; Thauvin 55'; Maupay 64'			Stadium: Stade Michel Volnay; Attendance: 8,067; Referee: Hamada Nampiandraza (Madagascar)
Note: The average age of the Singapore team is 22.3.

12 July Friendly	Singapore	2-2	FC Zbrojovka Brno	Salzburg, Austria
--:-- UTC+2	Khairul 43'; Sahil 60'	Report	Mezlik (pen.); Brigant 90'
Note: Training camp in Salzburg, Austria, from July 7-23.

18 July Friendly	Singapore	0-3	Torpedo Moscow	Salzburg, Austria
--:-- UTC+2		Report	Shevchenko 37', 50'; Salugin 55' (pen.)
Note: Training camp in Salzburg, Austria, from July 7-23.

21 July Friendly	Singapore	0-2	Dinamo Moscow	Salzburg, Austria
19:00 UTC+2		Report	Prudnikov 64', 67'
Note: Training camp in Salzburg, Austria, from July 7-23.

=== 2016 ===
20 July Training Match	Niigata University of Health and Welfare	3-2	Singapore	Niigata City, Japan
16:00 UTC+9	Kazuma 13', 22'; Kanta 56'	Report	Quak 9'; Hafiz Sujad 26'	Stadium: Swan Field
Note: Training camp in Niigata from 18-26 July 2016.

21 July Training Match	Japan Soccer College	0-2	Singapore	Niigata City, Japan
16:00 UTC+9		Report	Fazrul Nawaz 5'; Hafiz Nor 29'	Stadium: Swan Field
Note: Training camp in Niigata from 18-26 July 2016.

24 July Friendly	Albirex Niigata	3–0	Singapore	Niigata City, Japan
16:30 UTC+9	Go 3'; Hiroshi 13'; Kalil 16'	Report		Stadium: Denka Big Swan Stadium
Note: Training camp in Niigata from 18-26 July 2016.

5 November Friendly	Qatar Military Sports Assoc.	1-0	Singapore	Doha, Qatar
--:-- UTC+3
Note: Training Camp in Qatar from 2-6 November 2017.

=== 2017 ===
6 June Friendly	Singapore	1-1	Myanmar	Singapore
21:00 UTC+8	Nazrul 90+4'	Report	Aung Thu 60'	Stadium: Jalan Besar Stadium; Attendance: 0 (Note: Closed-door match)

=== 2018 ===
29 October Training Camp	Osaka Gakuin Univ.	4-1	Singapore	Osaka, Japan
--:-- UTC+8		Report		Stadium: J-Green Sakai
Note: Centralised training camp from 21 Dec to 2 Nov in J-Green Sakai, Osaka.

31 October Training Camp	Gamba Osaka U-23	3-0	Singapore	Osaka, Japan
--:-- UTC+8		Report		Stadium: J-Green Sakai
Note: Centralised training camp from 21 Dec to 2 Nov in J-Green Sakai, Osaka.

=== 2022 ===
8 December Training Camp	YSCC Yokohama	7-3	Singapore	Chiba, Japan
--:-- UTC+8		Report		Stadium: Prince Takamado Memorial JFA YUME Field
Note: Centralised training camp from 1-12 December in Chiba, Japan.

11 December Training Camp	Ryutsu Keizai Univ.	5-1	Singapore	Chiba, Japan
--:-- UTC+8		Report		Stadium: Inage Seaside Park
Note: Centralised training camp from 1-12 December in Chiba, Japan. Match duration: 45min＋35min.

11 December Training Camp	Ryutsu Keizai Univ.	2-0	Singapore	Chiba, Japan
--:-- UTC+8		Report		Stadium: Inage Seaside Park
Note: Centralised training camp from 1-12 December in Chiba, Japan. Match duration: 45min＋35min.

=== 2024 ===
6 September Closed Door	Singapore	3-0	BG Tampines Rovers	Kallang, Singapore
--:-- UTC+8				Stadium: Kallang Football Hub

7 September Closed Door	Singapore	0-3	Johor Darul Ta’zim	Kallang, Singapore
19:30 UTC+8			Nazmi Faiz 31'; Obregón 58'; Sumareh 90'	Stadium: Kallang Football Hub

10 October Training Camp	FC Tokyo	4-0	Singapore	Tokyo, Japan
11:00 UTC+9	Gaundino 19'; Endo 34'	Report		Stadium: Kodaira Ground; Attendance: 100
Note: Centralised training camp in Japan.

11 October Training Camp	Tokyo Verdy	1-2	Singapore	Tokyo, Japan
11:00 UTC+9	Shirai 76'	Report (futbol24); Report (ST)	Hami Syahin 15'; Faris Ramli 90+8'	Stadium: AGF field Attendance: 500
Note: Centralised training camp in Japan. Duration: 3x 35mins

14 October Training Camp	Yokohama F. Marinos	7-1	Singapore	Kanagawa, Japan
--:-- UTC+8	Mizunuma; Yamane; Homma 53'; Koike; Ueda 49'	Report	Faris Ramli 50'	Stadium: F. Marinos Sports Park; Attendance: 300
Note: Centralised training camp in Japan.

=== 2026 ===
10 July Training Camp	FC Ryukyu	2–0	Singapore	Okinawa, Japan
18:00 UTC+8	Yu Tomidokoro; Yosuke Ueno	Report		Stadium: Okinawa Athletic Park Stadium
Note: Centralised training camp in Okinawa from 6-17 July.

13 July Training Camp	Okinawa SV	3–2	Singapore	Okinawa, Japan
19:00 UTC+8	Tatsuya Murata 22'; Takahashi Kenshiro 26', 40'	Report	3'; 85'	Stadium: Okinawa Athletic Park Stadium
Note: Centralised training camp in Okinawa from 6-17 July.

16 July Training Camp	Albirex Niigata	(Note: The match is a closed-door preparation match against Albirex Niigata. Results are not available.)	Singapore	Okinawa, Japan
--:-- UTC+8				Stadium: Okinawa Athletic Park Stadium
Note: Centralised training camp in Okinawa from 6-17 July.

== See also ==
- Singapore women's national football team results
