= 1998 AFF Championship =

Giải vô địch bóng đá Đông Nam Á 1998

Tournament details
- Host country: Vietnam
- Dates: 26 August – 5 September
- Teams: 8
- Venues: 2 (in 2 host cities)

Final positions
- Champions: Singapore (1st title)
- Runners-up: Vietnam
- Third place: Indonesia
- Fourth place: Thailand

Tournament statistics
- Matches played: 16
- Goals scored: 55 (3.44 per match)
- Attendance: 222,000 (13,875 per match)
- Top scorer(s): (Myanmar) Myo Hlaing Win (4 goals)

The 1998 AFF Championship, officially known as the 1998 Tiger Cup, was the second edition of the AFF Championship. It was held in Vietnam from 26 August to 5 September 1998.

Thailand had been the defending champions, but lost to Vietnam in the semi-finals.

The unfancied Singapore national team won the tournament by a 1–0 victory against Vietnam in the finals to take their first title.

== Qualification ==
Four teams qualified directly to the finals.

- Indonesia (1996 fourth placed)
- Malaysia (1996 runner-up)
- Thailand (defending champions)
- Vietnam (Hosts, Third Placed)

Four teams qualified via the qualification process.

- Myanmar (Winner Qualification Group A)
- Singapore (Winner Qualification Group B)
- Laos (Runner-up Qualification Group A)
- Philippines (Runner-up Qualification Group B)

== Venues ==
Vietnam
Hanoi	1998 AFF Championship is located in Vietnam
Hanoi Stadium	1998 AFF Championship is located in Vietnam
Capacity: 22,500	1998 AFF Championship is located in Vietnam
Ho Chi Minh City	1998 AFF Championship is located in Vietnam
Thống Nhất Stadium	1998 AFF Championship is located in Vietnam
Capacity: 15,000	1998 AFF Championship is located in Vietnam

== Group stage ==
Key to colours in group tables
Top two placed teams advanced to the semi-finals

- All times are UTC+7.

=== Group A ===
Team	Pld	W	D	L	GF	GA	GD	Pts
Thailand	3	2	1	0	7	4	+3	7
Indonesia	3	2	0	1	11	5	+6	6
Myanmar	3	1	1	1	8	9	−1	4
Philippines	3	0	0	3	3	11	−8	0

27 August 1998
18:15

Indonesia	3–0	Philippines
Widodo 15'; Bima 42' (pen.); Uston 65'

Thống Nhất Stadium, Ho Chi Minh City
Attendance: 15,000
Referee: Shamsul Maidin (Singapore)
27 August 1998
20:45

Thailand	1–1	Myanmar
Worrawoot 15'		Aung Khine 65'

Thống Nhất Stadium, Ho Chi Minh City
Attendance: 15,000
Referee: Nik Ahmad Hafi Yacob (Malaysia)

29 August 1998
18:15

Thailand	3–1	Philippines
Worrawoot 21'; Kritsada 57'; Kiarung 86'		Gonzalez 30'

Thống Nhất Stadium, Ho Chi Minh City
Attendance: 15,000
Referee: Chan Siu Kee (Hong Kong)
29 August 1998
20:45

Indonesia	6–2	Myanmar
Aji 15' (pen.); Widodo 30'; Min Aung 39' (o.g.); Bima 54'; Miro 75' (pen.); Min Thu 77' (o.g.)		Myo Hlaing Win 1', 85' (pen.)

Thống Nhất Stadium, Ho Chi Minh City
Attendance: 15,000
Referee: Nguyễn Văn Mùi (Vietnam)

31 August 1998
18:15

Myanmar	5–2	Philippines
Win Htike 21'; Myo Hlaing Win 43', 85'; Aung Khine 78', 80'		Gonzalez 25', 30'

Thống Nhất Stadium, Ho Chi Minh City
Attendance: 12,000
Referee: Shamsul Maidin (Singapore)
31 August 1998
20:45

Thailand	3–2	Indonesia
Kritsada 62'; Therdsak 86'; Mursyid 90' (o.g.)		Miro 52'; Aji 84'

Thống Nhất Stadium, Ho Chi Minh City
Attendance: 5,000
Referee: Lu Jun (China)

=== Group B ===
Team	Pld	W	D	L	GF	GA	GD	Pts
Singapore	3	2	1	0	6	1	+5	7
Vietnam (H)	3	2	1	0	5	1	+4	7
Malaysia	3	0	1	2	0	3	−3	1
Laos	3	0	1	2	2	8	−6	1

26 August 1998
18:15

Malaysia	0–2	Singapore
		Rafi 17'; Ahmad Latiff 42'

Hanoi Stadium, Hanoi
Attendance: 5,000
Referee: Kim Young-joo (Korea Republic)
26 August 1998
20:45

Vietnam	4–1	Laos
Nguyễn Hồng Sơn 30'; Nguyễn Văn Sỹ 43'; Lê Huỳnh Đức 85', 90'		Keolakhone 55'

Hanoi Stadium, Hanoi
Attendance: 20,000
Referee: Hanlumyaung Panya (Thailand)

28 August 1998
18:15

Malaysia	0–0	Laos

Hanoi Stadium, Hanoi
Attendance: 15,000
Referee: Michael Andrews (India)
28 August 1998
20:45

Vietnam	0–0	Singapore

Hanoi Stadium, Hanoi
Attendance: 15,000
Referee: Jerry Andres (Philippines)

30 August 1998
18:15

Singapore	4–1	Laos
Zulkarnaen 3'; Ahmad Latiff 9', 15'; Rudy 58'		Kholadeth 30'

Hanoi Stadium, Hanoi
Attendance: 15,000
Referee: Jerry Andres (Philippines)
30 August 1998
20:45

Vietnam	1–0	Malaysia
Nguyễn Hồng Sơn 50'

Hanoi Stadium, Hanoi
Attendance: 15,000
Referee: Hanlumyaung Panya (Thailand)

== Knockout stage ==
=== Bracket ===
Semi-finals
2 September – Hanoi
Vietnam	3
Thailand	0
3 September – Ho Chi Minh City
Singapore	2
Indonesia	1

Final
5 September – Hanoi
Vietnam	0
Singapore	1
Third place
5 September – Ho Chi Minh City
Thailand	3 (4)
Indonesia (p)	3 (5)

=== Semi-finals ===
3 September 1998
20:00

Vietnam	3–0	Thailand
Trương Việt Hoàng 15'; Nguyễn Hồng Sơn 70'; Văn Sỹ Hùng 80'

Hanoi Stadium, Hanoi
Attendance: 23,000
3 September 1998
20:00

Singapore	2–1	Indonesia
Rafi 12'; Nazri 30'		Miro 34'

Thống Nhất Stadium, Ho Chi Minh City
Attendance: 7,000
Referee: Lu Jun (China)

=== Third place play-off ===
5 September 1998
16:00

Indonesia	3–3	Thailand
Kurniawan 16'; Aji 33'; Yusuf 89'		Chaichan 18'; Worrawoot 42'; Kovid 44'
Penalties
Uston (penalty scored); Bima (penalty scored); Yusuf (penalty scored); Kuncoro (penalty scored); Imam (penalty scored)	5–4	(penalty scored) Choketawee; (penalty missed) Anan; (penalty scored) Songserm; (penalty scored) Therdsak; (penalty scored) Kritsada

Thống Nhất Stadium, Ho Chi Minh City
Attendance: 5,000

=== Final ===
5 September 1998
20:00

Vietnam	0–1	Singapore
		Sasikumar 70'

Hanoi Stadium, Hanoi
Attendance: 25,000
Referee: Kim Young-joo (Korea Republic)

== Awards ==
Most Valuable Player	Golden Boot
(Vietnam) Nguyễn Hồng Sơn	(Myanmar) Myo Hlaing Win

== Goalscorers ==
4 goals

- (Myanmar) Myo Hlaing Win

3 goals

- (Indonesia) Aji Santoso
- (Indonesia) Miro Baldo Bento
- (Myanmar) Aung Khine
- (Philippines) Alfredo Razon Gonzalez
- (Singapore) Ahmad Latiff Khamaruddin
- (Thailand) Worrawoot Srimaka
- (Vietnam) Nguyễn Hồng Sơn

2 goals

- (Indonesia) Bima Sakti
- (Indonesia) Widodo Cahyono Putro
- (Singapore) Rafi Ali
- (Thailand) Kritsada Piandit
- (Vietnam) Lê Huỳnh Đức

1 goal

- (Indonesia) Kurniawan Dwi Yulianto
- (Indonesia) Uston Nawawi
- (Indonesia) Yusuf Ekodono
- (Laos) Keolakhone Channiphone
- (Laos) Kholadeth Phonephachanh
- (Myanmar) Win Htike
- (Singapore) Nazri Nasir
- (Singapore) Rudy Khairon Daiman
- (Singapore) R. Sasikumar
- (Singapore) Zulkarnaen Zainal
- (Thailand) Chaichan Kiewsen
- (Thailand) Klairung Treejaksung
- (Thailand) Kovid Foythong
- (Thailand) Therdsak Chaiman
- (Vietnam) Nguyễn Văn Sỹ
- (Vietnam) Trương Việt Hoàng
- (Vietnam) Văn Sỹ Hùng

1 own goal

- (Indonesia) Mursyid Effendi (playing against Thailand)
- (Myanmar) Min Aung (playing against Indonesia)
- (Myanmar) Min Thu (playing against Indonesia)

== Team statistics ==
This table will show the ranking of teams throughout the tournament.

Pos	Team	Pld	W	D	L	GF	GA	GD
Finals
1	Singapore	5	4	1	0	9	2	+7
2	Vietnam	5	3	1	1	8	2	+6
Semifinals
3	Indonesia	5	2	1	2	15	10	+5
4	Thailand	5	2	2	1	10	10	0
Eliminated in the group stage
5	Myanmar	3	1	1	1	8	9	−1
6	Malaysia	3	0	1	2	0	3	−3
7	Laos	3	0	1	2	2	8	−6
8	Philippines	3	0	0	3	3	11	−8

== Controversy ==
This tournament was marred by unsportsmanlike conduct in a match between Thailand and Indonesia during the group stage.

Indonesia was already assured of qualification for the semi-finals, while Thailand would also advance if they did not lose and the Philippines did not lose to Myanmar by enough for Myanmar to steal the runners up spot. However, both teams also knew that the winners of the match would face hosts Vietnam in the semi-finals, while the losing team would face surprise group winners Singapore, who were perceived to be easier opposition, and would also avoid the inconvenience of moving their team's training base from Ho Chi Minh City to Hanoi for the semi-finals.

The first half saw little action, with both teams barely making any attempt to score. During the second half both teams managed to score, resulting in a 2–2 score after 90 minutes: during injury time and despite two Thai attackers attempting to stop him, Indonesian defender Mursyid Effendi deliberately scored an own goal, thus handing Thailand a 3–2 victory. FIFA subsequently fined both teams $40,000 for "violating the spirit of the game", while Mursyid was banned from domestic football for one year and from international football for life.

Ironically in the semi-finals, Indonesia lost to Singapore, while Thailand lost to Vietnam. Singapore would then win the Championship.
