= Kovid =

Kovid is a given name of Sanskrit origin, meaning "wise," "learned," or "skilled." It is primarily found in India and Thailand and may refer to:

- Kovid Foythong (born 1974), former Thai football player
- Kovid Gupta (born 1988), American author, screenwriter, filmmaker, and social activist
- Kovid Goyal (born 1983), open-source developer known for co-creating Calibre

== See also ==
- Coronavirus diseases (COVID), a category of diseases caused by different coronaviruses
  - COVID-19, a coronavirus disease that resulted in the COVID-19 pandemic
    - COVID-19 pandemic, an ongoing global pandemic of the above
- Kowit Wattana (1947–2025), Thai general
- Ram Nath Kovind (born 1945), Indian politician
