= Philippine Premier League =

Defunct top-level association football league in the Philippines (2019)

- Organising body: PPL Sports Group, Inc.
- Founded: 8 December 2018; 7 years ago
- Folded: 4 May 2019; 7 years ago
- Country: Philippines
- Confederation: AFC
- Number of clubs: 4
- Level on pyramid: 1
- Domestic cup: Copa Paulino Alcantara
- International cup(s): AFC Champions League; AFC Cup
- Last champions: None awarded
- Broadcaster(s): ESPN5

The Philippine Premier League (PPL) was a short-lived top-flight association football league in the Philippines sanctioned by the Philippine Football Federation (PFF). It was intended as a successor league to the Philippines Football League (PFL) which ran for two seasons. The first and only PPL season had a single match day on April 27, 2019 before it was folded, after the PFF withdrew its sanction of the league.

== History ==
=== Foundation ===
The Philippines Football League (PFL), the precursor of the PPL, was established in 2016 as a league with a national scope as opposed to the United Football League which was concentrated in Metro Manila. The PFL had two seasons from 2017 to 2018 which were both won by Ceres–Negros F.C.

However, issues plagued the league and it was decided that the PFL would be scrapped. The PFL followed a home-and-away format which caused financial and logistical problems for the league's participating clubs. The PFL saw Ilocos United and Meralco Manila withdrawing from the league due to financial reasons. The league itself lacked sponsorship, generated insufficient revenue, had limited attendance and television coverage.

Bernie Sumayao of the Triple CH Group entered into negotiations with Philippine Football Federation President Mariano Araneta sometime in the latter half of 2018 to discuss about planned reforms regarding the system of the Philippines' top-flight football league. Sumayao was later appointed as the commissioner of the upcoming Philippine Premier League which was to replace the PFL and is to absorb the remaining clubs of the PFL. The PFL then saw the withdrawal of Davao Aguilas F.C. by its owner Jefferson Cheng reportedly due to the PFF's decision to award Sumayao's group the organization of the league despite's Cheng's volunteering to do the same.

The PPL, sometimes described as a rebranded PFL, replaced it and was described as a "new neutral independent league" which has an objective to develop football in the Philippines, according to its commissioner Bernie Sumayao.

"Philippine Premier League" was among the proposed names mentioned in the Nielsen Study commissioned for the then-planned establishment of the PFL.

The official launch of the PPL was held on January 23, 2019 at the Fairmont Hotel in Makati. At least 11 clubs expressed interest to join the league with the organizers confirming on March 1, 2019 the participation of seven clubs for the inaugural season.

=== Launch and dissolution ===
The Philippine Premier League had several issues before the first match took place. The commencement of the league was delayed after the Philippine Football Federation (PFF) ruled two participants Mendiola and Philippine Air Force as ineligible to participate due to their licensing issues with the national football association. The season's launch was moved to April 27 from March 31 so that the two clubs can resubmit relevant documents to settle their licensing issues. In mid-April 2019, PFF President Mariano Araneta expressed confidence that the league will push through despite the two club's licensing issues and noted that the two teams already appealed their case.

Stallion Laguna and Global Makati withdrew from the league a day before the first match day due to loss of confidence to the league's organizers. In a joint conference they stated that the lack of professionalism, transparency and disagreement with the centralized format of the league as their reasons for their withdrawal.

The league commenced as scheduled on April 27, 2019 with changes in the opening fixtures. Philippine Air Force and Mendiola figured in a 2–2 draw despite both teams' licensing issues have not been settled yet, while Kaya-Iloilo had a 3–0 victory over Green Archers.

The withdrawal of the two teams caused a debate on social media regarding the status of the league. PPL Commissioner Bernie Sumayao has stated that they technically never joined the league since did not sign any participation agreement or pay the participation fee, but has expressed openness to have a discussion with relevant stakeholders. He also responded to accusation that the league organizers were never in contact with Stallion and Global Makati and stated that he had tasked league director Ritchie Gannaban reach out to them and find out what would it take for the two clubs to formally join the league. Sumayao also cited the fact that an AFC elite referee officiated the match between Kaya and Green Archers United as proof of the support of the PFF of the league.

The league organizers then announced on May 2 that there would be no fixtures scheduled for the then-upcoming weekend, and the PFF announced its board's decision to withdraw sanction of the PPL, effectively dissolving it on the following day. The decision was made reportedly due to "serious mismanagement" of the league, inability to secure a title sponsor, and allowing Mendiola and Philippine Air Force to play in defiance of the federation. The national football association also announced that it is also working with the license clubs to continue the Philippines Football League (PFL). The 2019 Philippines Football League was later successfully held.

== Competition format ==
The PPL was planned to follow a triple round-robin format, or three legs with matches to be played on weekends. Each day was intended feature two ties. This is opposed to the Philippine Football League (PFL) which used a home-and-away format. The first leg of the inaugural season was held in Metro Manila with the University of Makati Stadium strongly considered as the venue. and there were plans to host matches in Cebu. A promotion and relegation system was planned for introduction in the second or third season.

Each leg was to feature centralized matches to be hosted in specific venues to minimize costs for the league's participating clubs. Side community events such as concerts, fairs, "activations", and other activities were also planned to be held alongside league matches as a fan engagement effort.

The domestic cup competition would have still been the Copa Paulino Alcantara, which served as cup competition for the PFL.

== 2019 season ==
Philippine Premier League
- Season: 2019
- Dates: April 27, 2019 – August 2019 (planned)
- Matches: 2
- Goals: 7 (3.5 per match)
- Top goalscorer: seven players (1 goal)
- Highest scoring: Philippine Air Force 2–2 Mendiola (April 27)

=== Clubs ===
The inaugural PPL season was initially announced to be participated by 7 clubs. However, two of them later withdrew and the five remaining clubs were:

- Ceres-Negros
- Green Archers United Globe
- Kaya F.C.–Iloilo
- Mendiola
- Philippine Air Force

Mendiola and Philippine Air Force were announced as participants for the season by the league organizers but were ruled ineligible to participate due to their licensing issues with the Philippine Football Federation. The league postponed the season's launch to April 27 so that the two clubs can resubmit their documents for licensing.

Stallion Laguna and Global Makati withdrew from the league as a protest against its mismanagement.

=== Venue ===
Only the Rizal Memorial Stadium has hosted matches of the Philippine Premier League.

Manila	Manila (Luzon)
Rizal Memorial Stadium	Manila (Luzon)
Capacity: 12,873	Manila (Luzon)

=== League table ===
Pos	Team	Pld	W	D	L	GF	GA	GD	Pts	Notes
1	Kaya–Iloilo	1	1	0	0	3	0	+3	3	
2	Mendiola	1	0	1	0	2	2	0	1	
3	Philippine Air Force	1	0	1	0	2	2	0	1	
4	Green Archers United	1	0	0	1	0	3	−3	0	
N/A	Ceres–Negros	0	0	0	0	0	0	0	0	Withdrew

Source: RSSSF

=== Matches ===
The league's only season had two matches on April 27, 2019. Originally Philippine Air Force was scheduled to play against Kaya–Iloilo in the first match, while Mendiola was set to play against Green Archers United. However Philippine Air Force and Mendiola were denied professional license which led to the schedule being revamped which meant that the two faced each other in the league's first match despite a directive of the Philippine Football Federation not to include the two teams in the league's fixtures.

The Philippine Premier League organizers announced on May 2, 2019 that there would be no fixtures for the following weekend due to "uncontrollable circumstances" and the league was effectively folded after the PFF announced its withdrawal of league sanction the following day.

27 April 2019
16:00

Philippine Air Force	2–2	Mendiola
Bebangco 39'; Barsales 79'	Report	Balabat 8'; Corsame 58'

Rizal Memorial Stadium, Manila
27 April 2019
19:00

Kaya–Iloilo	3–0	Green Archers United
Amita 13'; Bedic 16'; Tuason 79'	Report

Rizal Memorial Stadium, Manila

== Organization ==
The Philippine Premier League was sanctioned by the Philippine Football Federation (PFF) which authorized PPL Sports Group, Inc. to operate and promote the league. Bernie Sumayao of the Triple CH Group was the league commissioner.

Clubs of the PPL reportedly had to pay an annual registration fee which is described to be lower than the equivalent fee members of the Philippine Football League, which followed a franchise system, had to pay. Participating clubs reportedly to have 40 percent equity share in the PPL Sports Group's board.

== Media coverage ==
ESPN5 was the broadcast partner of the Philippine Premier League with matches to be broadcast on the 5 Plus channel. For the inaugural season around 23 matches were planned to be aired live on 5 Plus and highlights were to be featured in ESPN5's SportsCenter. Live streaming of matches was also being planned.
