= Raymund Tonog =

Filipino footballer

Personal information
- Full name: Raymund de la Peña Tonog
- Date of birth: May 9, 1971 (age 55)
- Place of birth: Bacolod, Philippines
- Position: Defender

Senior career*
Years	Team	Apps	(Gls)
- Philippine Air Force

International career
1996–2004	Philippines		
- * Club domestic league appearances and goals

Raymund de la Peña Tonog (born May 9, 1971) is a former Filipino international footballer who played as a defender.

== Career ==
=== Club ===
Tonog played for Philippine Air Force F.C.

=== International ===
Tonog has played for the Philippines in the 1998 FIFA World Cup qualifiers in 1996 debuting in the 0-2 loss against India in the Asian preliminary round. He joined the national team again in 2001 in the 2002 FIFA World Cup qualification qualifiers

Tonog has also played for the national team in the AFF Championship participating in the 1998, 2000, and 2004.
