= Rusdy Bahalwan =

Indonesian association football player

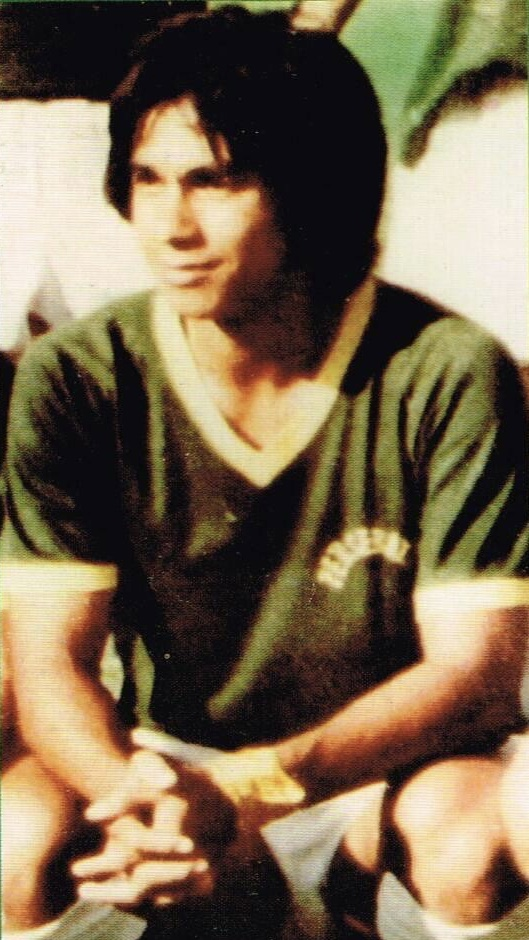
- Rusdy playing for Persebaya Surabaya in 1974

Personal information
- Date of birth: 7 June 1947
- Place of birth: Surabaya, Indonesia
- Date of death: 7 August 2011 (aged 64)
- Place of death: Surabaya, Indonesia
- Position: Right-back

Youth career
- 1963–1968: Assyabaab Surabaya

Senior career*
Years	Team	Apps	(Gls)
1969–1980	Persebaya Surabaya		

International career
1973–1977	Indonesia		

Managerial career
- 1985–1987: PSIL Lumajang
- 1990–1998: Persebaya Surabaya
- 1998: Indonesia
- 2000: Persewangi Banyuwangi
- * Club domestic league appearances and goals

Rusdy Bahalwan (7 June 1947 – 7 August 2011) was an Indonesian former football player and manager, who last managed Persewangi Banyuwangi.

== Early life ==
Rusdy Bahalwan was born on 7 June 1947 in Surabaya to Ali Bahalwan and Rugaiyah Baadillah. He graduated from SMA Negeri 6 Surabaya in 1966. He was then accepted at the Faculty of Economics, Airlangga University in 1967 before finally deciding to drop out and focus on his football career.

== Career ==
Rusdy started his football career from Assyabaab Surabaya in 1963 and played as a right-back. In the period 1970–1979 he strengthened Persebaya Surabaya and won the Perserikatan trophy in 1976.

In 1972, Rusdy was called into the PSSI B national team. A year later he was called into the Indonesia national team along with four other Persebaya players; Abdul Kadir, Kainun Waskito, Jacob Sihasale and Budi Santoso. They were trained by Djamiat Dalhar to prepare for the 1972 Merdeka Tournament in Kuala Lumpur, Malaysia and the Jakarta Anniversary Tournament.

After retiring as a player, Rusdy was appointed as Persebaya's coach and led the club to win the 1996–97 Liga Indonesia Premier Division. The players he coached at that time included Jacksen F. Tiago, Carlos de Mello and Eri Irianto. Having coached the Indonesia national team in the 1998 Tiger Cup, Rusdy was last recorded as the coach of Persewangi Banyuwangi in 2000.

== Later years and death ==
Rusdy died on 7 August 2011 at his home on Tenggilis Mejoyo Street, Surabaya. He died of a stroke that he had suffered since 2004. He also suffered from a degenerative disease and died at the age of 64, leaving behind a wife and three children: Irfan Bahalwan, Khaira Imandina Bahalwan and Ikhwannurdin Bahalwan.
