= Nazri Nasir =

Singaporean footballer

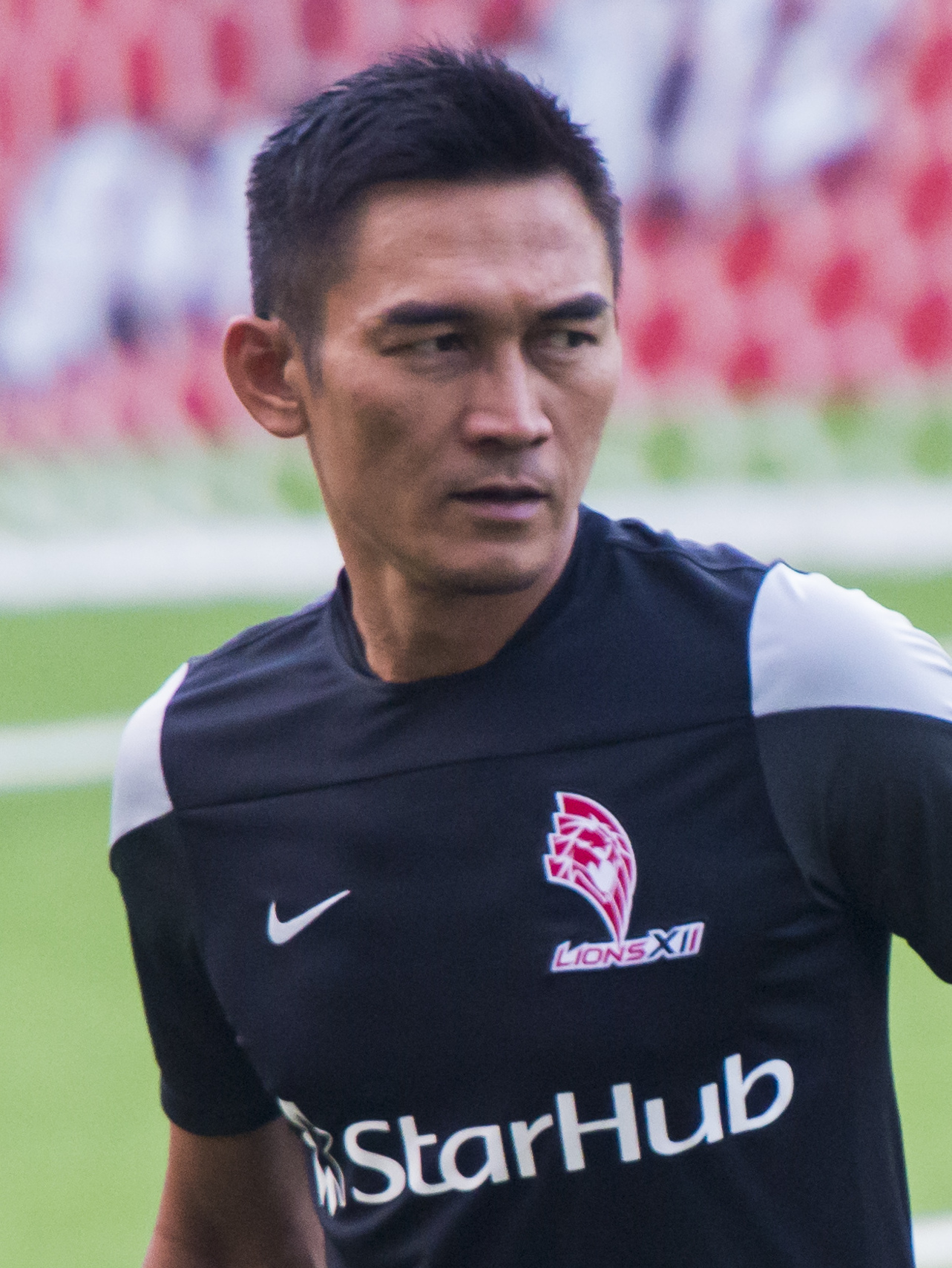
- Nazri as assistant coach of the LionsXII in 2014

Personal information
- Full name: Mohamed Nazri bin Nasir
- Date of birth: 17 January 1971 (age 55)
- Place of birth: Singapore
- Height: 1.78 m (5 ft 10 in)
- Positions: Defensive midfielder; centre back

Team information
- Current team: Tampines Rovers (head coach)

Youth career
- 1987: Jurong Town

Senior career*
Years	Team	Apps	(Gls)
1988–1991	Jurong Town		
1991–1992	Balestier United	10	(0)
1992–1994	Police SA		
1994–1995	Singapore FA	14	(6)
1996	Sembawang Rangers	24	(1)
1997–2001	SAFFC		
2002–2008	Tampines Rovers	299	(19)

International career
1990–2004	Singapore	104	(13)

Managerial career
- 2014–2015: LionsXII (assistant)
- 2017–2018: Young Lions (assistant)
- 2018: Singapore (assistant)
- 2019: Singapore (interim)
- 2020–2024: Singapore U23
- 2021–2022: Singapore (interim)
- 2021–2025: Young Lions
- 2022–2025: Singapore (assistant)
- 2024–2025: Singapore U23 (assistant)
- 2025–2026: Ventforet Kofu (assistant)
- 2026–: Tampines Rovers
- * Club domestic league appearances and goals

Mohamed Nazri bin Nasir (born 17 January 1971) is a Singaporean professional football manager and former footballer. He was the captain of the Singapore national team from 1997 to 2003, and led the team to the 1998 AFF Championship title. He is currently the head coach of the Singapore Premier League club, Tampines Rovers.

He was a defensive midfielder known for his "combative, hard-running and ferocious tackling style".

Nazri had spent most of his time as a head coach that understand the youth development fundamental and their weakness. He holds an AFC Pro Diploma Coaching Certificate license.

== Personal life ==
Nazri was born to father, Nasir Ahmad (d. December 1993, aged 69) and mother, Aisha Abdullah. He credits his mother for supporting his football career despite him having asthma at eight years old and poor grades in his studies. He has six brothers and four sisters. His older brother, Amin, is a former Singapore international defender and current Hougang United coach.

He completed his primary education at Sembawang Primary School and secondary education at Si Ling Secondary School. He graduated with a NTC 2 certificate in architectural draughting from McNair Vocational Institute.

Nazri married ex air stewardess Erna Yanti Saat on 1st January 2022. His sons, Adam and Amer Hakeem, play under the National Football Academy set-up as centre-backs.

== Club career ==
=== Jurong Town ===
Nazri began his career with Jurong Town in Singapore's FAS Premier League in 1988. where he won the President's Cup in 1988 and 1989.

==== Trials at FC Nitra ====
Along with Rafi Ali and Sanizal Jamil, he was sent for a two-month training stint with Slovak club FC Nitra under the Goh Chok Tong Talent Scheme in 1990.

=== Balestier United ===
Nazri rejected an offer of a professional contract from FC Nitra and signed for Balestier United in 1991 on a two-year deal worth S$10,000 per year.

=== Singapore FA ===
In February 1994, Nazri signed a two-year contract with the Singapore FA which went on to achieve the Malaysian League and Malaysia Cup double that year. Following the withdrawal of the team from Malaysian competitions and the upcoming Southeast Asian Games, the FAS decided to enter the Lions in the 1995 Premier League pending the formation of Singapore's S.League. The team went the season unbeaten as they finished winners.

=== Sembawang Rangers ===
Nazri played for Sembawang Rangers in the inaugural 1996 S.League season.

=== SAFFC ===
In 1997, Nazri signed for SAFFC the following year. He won the S.League in 1997 and 1998. After club captain Fandi Ahmad retired from football and became SAFFC head coach, Nazri became the club captain from the 2000 season onwards where he won the league title in his first season as captain.

=== Tampines Rovers ===
In 2002, Nazri signed for Tampines Rovers where he played as a central defender, winning the league in 2004 and 2005 as club captain.

Nazri retired as a player at the age of 37 in 2008.

== International career ==
Nazri made his international debut against Malaysia on 13 September 1990. He was riding his motorbike when he was injured in a road traffic accident on the expressway on 19 November 1992; his backbone and right collarbone were fractured. He began retraining five weeks later but did not recover sufficiently to play in the 1993 Merdeka Tournament in February 1993.

However, in the 1999 Dunhill Cup held in Vietnam, Nazri scored a late 86th-minute goal against Russia which would have secured the win until teammate Mohd Noor Ali scored an own goal in the very last minute of the match.

On 7 February 2002, Nazri scored the winning goal in a 2–1 win over North Korea. On 21 May 2002, he captained Singapore in the friendly match against Uruguay in a 2–1 lost.

On 9 August 1999 which technically fall on Singapore national day, as the score was at 1–1 against causeway rivals Malaysia, Nazri scored the winning goal in the 90+5 injury stoppage time goal to secure the win in a friendly match.

Nazri took over the captaincy in 1997 and skippered Singapore to the 1998 AFF Championship title. He was inducted into the FIFA Century Club in June 2007.

== International statistics ==
=== International goals ===
International goals by date, venue, cap, opponent, score, result and competition
No.	Date	Venue	Opponent	Score	Result	Competition
1	4 December 1991	Rizal Memorial Stadium, Manila, Philippines	Philippines	2–0	2–0	Friendly
2	21 February 1997	Stadium Merdeka, Kuala Lumpur, Malaysia	China	1–3	1–3	1997 Dunhill Cup
3	9 October 1997	Lebak Bulus Stadium, Jakarta, Indonesia	Cambodia	1–0	2–1	Friendly
4	9 October 1997	Lebak Bulus Stadium, Jakarta, Indonesia	Cambodia	2–0	2–1	Friendly
5	3 September 1998	Thống Nhất Stadium, Ho Chi Minh City, Vietnam	Indonesia	2–1	2–1	1998 AFF Championship
6	2 February 1999	Thống Nhất Stadium, Ho Chi Minh City, Vietnam	Russia	1–0	1–1	1999 Dunhill Cup
7	31 July 1999	Berakas Sports Complex, Bandar Seri Begawan, Brunei	Malaysia	2–1	2–1	Friendly
8	9 August 1999	Hassanal Bolkiah National Stadium, Bandar Seri Begawan, Brunei	Cambodia	2–0	2–0	Friendly
9	7 February 2000	Singapore National Stadium, Kallang, Singapore	Malaysia	2–1	3–1	Friendly
10	28 October 2000	Bishan Stadium, Bishan, Singapore	Sri Lanka	2–0	4–0	2002 AFF Championship
11	9 November 2001	Tinsulanon Stadium, Songkhla, Thailand	Laos	2–0	3–0	2002 AFF Championship
12	7 February 2002	Singapore National Stadium, Kallang, Singapore	North Korea	2–1	2–1	Friendly
13	16 July 2002	Darul Makmur Stadium, Pahang, Malaysia	Malaysia	1–0	2–1	Friendly

== Managerial career ==
After retiring as a player, Nazri was appointed as the general manager at former club Tampines Rovers. He then take on a role as a coach of the National Football Academy U-15 teams that participated in the 2012 and 2013 Lion City Cup.

On 16 December 2013, he was confirmed as assistant to the LionsXII head coach and former Singapore Lions teammate Fandi Ahmad for the upcoming 2014 Malaysia Super League season. He then joined Fandi again, as his assistant coach for the newly revamp 2018 Singapore Premier League season.

On 7 March, 2019, Nazri was appointed as interim head coach of the Singapore national team for the 2019 Airmarine Cup friendly tournament on 20 and 23 March. With the team, he won the semi-final match against Malaysia 1–0 before losing in the final to Oman 4–5 on penalties, having tied 1–1 in normal time.

On 12 July 2023, Nazri lead the Under-22s for the 2024 AFC U-23 Asian Cup qualification qualifiers in September. This will also be implemented as the FAS shared that Nazri is set to have his provisional squad report for centralised training on 21 August 2023, with changes made to the SPL fixtures to allow the team to have uninterrupted 14-day pre-competition preparation time before they leave for Vietnam. Eventually Nazri was unable to helped the U-23 team qualify to the final tournament.

On 29 November 2024, Nazri saw himself getting a red card for the first time as a head coach during the league match between Young Lions and Albirex Niigata (S).

On 19 January 2025, Nazri was given an opportunity with a Japanese club for coaching attachment stint where on 15 May, he became the assistant coach of J2 League club Ventforet Kofu working under head coach Shinji Otsuka.

== Managerial statistics ==
As of match played 22 November 2026

Managerial record by team and tenure
Team	Nat.	From	To	Record					Ref.
Team	Nat.	From	To	G	W	D	L	Win %	Ref.
Singapore (interim)	(Singapore)	1 March 2019	24 March 2019	2	1	1	0	50.00	
Young Lions	(Singapore)	1 January 2020	10 March 2021	14	4	0	10	28.57	
Singapore U23	(Singapore)	1 January 2020	31 December 2022	9	2	3	4	22.22	
Young Lions	(Singapore)	1 January 2022	31 December 2022	31	2	3	26	6.45	
Singapore (interim)	(Singapore)	16 March 2022	24 April 2022	2	2	0	0	100.00	
Young Lions	(Singapore)	13 July 2023	16 January 2025	29	6	3	20	20.69	
Singapore U23	(Singapore)	13 July 2023	14 May 2025	4	0	2	2	0.00	
Tampines Rovers	(Singapore)	2 July 2026	Present	13	6	2	5	46.15	
Career Total				104	23	14	67	22.12	

== Honours ==
=== As player ===
Jurong Town

- President's Cup: 1988, 1989

Singapore Lions

- M.League: 1994
- Malaysia Cup: 1994

Singapore Armed Forces

- S.League: 1997, 1998, 2000
- Singapore Cup: 1997, 1999

Tampines Rovers

- S.League: 2004, 2005
- Singapore Cup: 2002, 2004, 2006

=== International ===
Singapore

- ASEAN Football Championship: 1998

=== Individual ===
- S.League People's Choice Award: 2004
- S.League Player of the Year: 1997

== See also ==
- List of men's footballers with 100 or more international caps

Sporting positions
Preceded by Lim Tong Hai	Singapore national team captain 1997-2003	Succeeded by Aide Iskandar
