= 1999 Dunhill Cup Vietnam =

Tournament details
- Host country: Vietnam
- Dates: 29 January – 7 February
- Teams: 8
- Venue: 1 (in 1 host city)

Final positions
- Champions: South Korea (1st title)
- Runners-up: China

Tournament statistics
- Matches played: 15
- Goals scored: 47 (3.13 per match)
- Top scorer: (China) Zhang Yuning (7 goals)

1999 Dunhill Cup Vietnam was a friendly international football tournament held in Vietnam in 1999. It was the last edition of the Dunhill friendly tournaments. It was won by South Korea.

Although the tournament's participants both send their national squads, some teams like Bulgaria, China, South Korea, Russia and Iran sent mostly their Olympic players into the teams. They were all registered as the senior squads instead. Some notable international players, like Maksim Buznikin, Lee Dong-gook and Ali Karimi, participated in the tournament and would have become parts of their national squads later. For South Korea, the tournament was also a preparation for the 2002 FIFA World Cup to be held in home soil.

== Group stage ==
=== Group 1 ===
Teams qualified for next phase

Team	Pld	W	D	L	GF	GA	GD	Pts
Vietnam	3	2	1	0	4	2	+2	7
Iran	3	1	1	1	7	4	+3	4
Russia	3	1	1	1	3	2	+1	4
Singapore	3	0	1	2	1	7	−6	1

29 January 1999

Vietnam	1–0	Singapore
Văn Sỹ Hùng 56'	Report

Thống Nhất Stadium, Ho Chi Minh City

29 January 1999

Russia	2–0	Iran
Buznikin 43', 73'	Report

Thống Nhất Stadium, Ho Chi Minh City

31 January 1999

Vietnam	1–0	Russia
Nguyễn Phi Hùng 24'	Report

Thống Nhất Stadium, Ho Chi Minh City

31 January 1999

Iran	5–0	Singapore
Baghmiseh 27', 61'; Karimi 34'; Jamshidi 65', 81'	Report

Thống Nhất Stadium, Ho Chi Minh City

2 February 1999

Singapore	1–1	Russia
Nazri Nasir 86'	Report	Mohd Noor Ali 90' (o.g.)

Thống Nhất Stadium, Ho Chi Minh City

2 February 1999

Iran	2–2	Vietnam
Jamshidi 84'; Majidi 89'	Report	Lê Huỳnh Đức 16'; Nguyễn Phi Hùng 79'

Thống Nhất Stadium, Ho Chi Minh City

=== Group 2 ===
Teams qualified for next phase

Team	Pld	W	D	L	GF	GA	GD	Pts
South Korea	3	3	0	0	10	2	+8	9
China	3	2	0	1	10	4	+6	6
Bulgaria	3	0	1	2	3	8	–5	1
Malaysia	3	0	1	2	2	11	−9	1

30 January 1999

Malaysia	1–1	Bulgaria
G. Shanmugan 21'	Report	Stoykov 82'

Thống Nhất Stadium, Ho Chi Minh City

31 January 1999

South Korea	2–1	China
Lee Dong-gook 24', 52'	Report	Zhang Yuning 64'

Thống Nhất Stadium, Ho Chi Minh City

1 February 1999

South Korea	3–0	Malaysia
Kim Do-hyun 25'; Lee Dong-gook 38'; Choi Chul-woo 88'	Report

Thống Nhất Stadium, Ho Chi Minh City

1 February 1999

China	2–1	Bulgaria
Sui Dongliang 36'; Zhang Yuning 90'	Report	Stoykov 11'

Thống Nhất Stadium, Ho Chi Minh City

3 February 1999

Bulgaria	1–5	South Korea
Tchomakov 9'	Report	Kim Dong-sun 1', 71' (pen.); Sin Byung-ho 53', 80'; Lee Kwan-ho 62'

Thống Nhất Stadium, Ho Chi Minh City

3 February 1999

China	7–1	Malaysia
Sui Dongliang 12'; Wang Peng 49', 63'; Zhang Yuning 52', 61', 86'; Ma Yongkang 72'	Report	Zami Mohd Noor 16'

Thống Nhất Stadium, Ho Chi Minh City

== Knockout stage ==
Semi-finals
5 February – Ho Chi Minh City
Vietnam	1
China	4
5 February – Ho Chi Minh City
South Korea	2
Iran	0

Final
7 February – Ho Chi Minh City
China	0
South Korea	1

=== Semi-finals ===
5 February 1999

Vietnam	1–4	China
Lê Huỳnh Đức 90'	Report	Zhang Yuning 13', 75'; Wang Peng 15'; Huang Yong 64'

Thống Nhất Stadium, Ho Chi Minh City

5 February 1999

South Korea	2–0	Iran
Seol Ki-hyeon 46'; Lee Dong-gook 55'	Report

Thống Nhất Stadium, Ho Chi Minh City

=== Final ===
7 February 1999

China	0–1	South Korea
	Report	Choi Chul-woo 90'

Thống Nhất Stadium, Ho Chi Minh City

== Award ==
1999 Dunhill Cup Vietnam winner

South Korea
First title
