= Kuncoro =

Indonesian footballer (1973–2026)

Personal information
- Date of birth: 7 March 1973
- Place of birth: Malang, Indonesia
- Date of death: 18 January 2026 (aged 52)
- Place of death: Malang, Indonesia
- Height: 1.73 m (5 ft 8 in)
- Positions: Defender; midfielder

Youth career
- Kaki Mas Dampit

Senior career*
Years	Team	Apps	(Gls)
1991−1996	Arema Malang		
1996−1997	Assyabaab		
1997−1998	Mitra Surabaya		
1998−1999	Persija Jakarta		
1999−2000	PSM Makassar		
2001	Arema Malang		
2002	Gelora Putra Delta		
2003	Perseden Denpasar		
2003	Persik Kediri		
2004	Persijap Jepara		
2005	Persegi Gianyar		
2007	Persipro Probolinggo		
2008	PSIR Rembang		
2009	PSMP Mojokerto		
2010	Persikubar West Kutai		
2010	Bhayangkara FC		

International career
1994−1998	Indonesia		

Managerial career
- 2012–2026: Arema (assistant coach)
- * Club domestic league appearances and goals

Kuncoro (7 March 1973 – 18 January 2026) was an Indonesian footballer who played as a defender and midfielder. He played for Indonesia in the 1994 Independence Cup, the Tiger PSSI and the 1998 Tiger Cup. He won titles in three different seasons: with Arema in 1992−93, PSM Makassar in 1999–2000, and Persik Kediri in 2003.

In April 2000, he was involved in an incident with Kurniawan Dwi Yulianto and Mursyid Effendi at a Crystal Meth party at the Weta Hotel, Surabaya. He was disciplined by the PSSI Disciplinary Committee. After retiring, he attended a C license trainer course. Until his death, he was assistant coach for Arema.

On 18 January 2026, Kuncoro died of a heart attack while playing football at Gajayana Stadium. He was 52.

== Honours ==
Arema Malang

- Galatama: 1992−93

PSM Makassar

- Liga Indonesia Premier Division: 1999–2000

Persik Kediri

- Liga Indonesia Premier Division: 2003

Indonesia

- AFF Championship third place: 1998
