= Miro Baldo Bento =

Indonesian footballer (born 1975)

Personal information
- Full name: Miro Baldo Bento de Araújo
- Date of birth: 4 June 1975 (age 51)
- Place of birth: Dili, Portuguese Timor
- Height: 1.74 m (5 ft 9 in)
- Position: Striker

Team information
- Current team: Timor-Leste (assistant)

Senior career*
Years	Team	Apps	(Gls)
1992–1999	Persija Jakarta		
1999–2002	PSM Makassar	46	(21)
2003	Perseden Denpasar	30	(9)
2004	Persekaba Badung		(4)
2004–2005	Persijap Jepara	37	(12)
2006	Persmin Minahasa		(1)
2007	Persiba Balikpapan	12	(2)
2007	Persela Lamongan	11	(2)
2008–2009	PSBL Langsa		
2010	PSIS Semarang	14	(5)
2016	Porto Taibesse		
Total		150	(56)

International career
1998–2000	Indonesia	9	(3)

Managerial career
- 2008–2009: Persiram Raja Ampat academy
- 2016–2018: Porto Taibesse (assistant)
- 2018–2019: Timor Leste (assistant)
- 2019–2020: Boavista TL (assistant)
- 2020–: Boavista TL
- 2024–: Timor-Leste (assistant)
- 2024–: Timor-Leste U23 (assistant)
- * Club domestic league appearances and goals

Miro Baldo Bento de Araújo (born 4 June 1975) is a football coach and former player. He is currently the head coach of Boavista TL and an assistant coach for the Timor-Leste national team. Born in East Timor, he played for the Indonesia national team.

== Career statistics ==
List of international goals scored by Miro Baldo Bento
No.	Date	Venue	Opponent	Score	Result	Competition
1	29 August 1998	Thong Nhat Stadium, Ho Chi Minh City, Vietnam	Myanmar	5–1	6–2	1998 Tiger Cup
2	31 August 1998	Thong Nhat Stadium, Ho Chi Minh City, Vietnam	Thailand	0–1	3–2	1998 Tiger Cup
3	3 September 1998	Thong Nhat Stadium, Ho Chi Minh City, Vietnam	Singapore	2–1	2–1	1998 Tiger Cup

== Honours ==
PSM Makassar

- Liga Indonesia Premier Division: 1999–2000; runner up: 2001

Indonesia

- AFF Championship runner-up: 2000; third place: 1998

== See also ==
- List of Indonesia international footballers born outside Indonesia
