= Michael Andrews (referee) =

Indian football referee (born 1956)

- Full name: Michael Andrews
- Born: 14 November 1956 (age 69); Kerala, India

Domestic
Years	League	

International
Years	League	Role
1995–2001	FIFA listed	Referee

Michael Andrews (born 14 November 1956) is an Indian former professional football referee, who officiated in the National Football League, and for FIFA. He has refereed in tournaments such as AFC Champions League, AFC Asian Cup and Nehru Cup.

After retirement as a referee, Andrews served as a referee assessor with FIFA and Asian Football Confederation.

== See also ==
- List of football referees
