= Kritsada Piandit =

Thai footballer (born 1971)

Personal information
- Full name: Kritsada Piandit
- Date of birth: 2 December 1971 (age 54)
- Place of birth: Narathiwat, Thailand
- Height: 1.68 m (5 ft 6 in)
- Positions: Right back; right winger

Senior career*
Years	Team	Apps	(Gls)
1994–2004	TOT		

International career
1994–1999	Thailand	35+	(5)

Managerial career
- 2009: J.W. Rangsit
- 2011–2012: Samut Prakan Customs United
- 2015: Osotspa Samut Prakan
Medal record
Thailand national football team
Southeast Asian Games
Gold medal – first place	1993 Singapore	Team competition
Gold medal – first place	1995 Thailand	Team competition
Gold medal – first place	1997 Indonesia	Team competition
Gold medal – first place	1999 Brunei Darussalam	Team competition
- * Club domestic league appearances and goals

Kritsada Piandit (Thai กฤษดา เพี้ยนดิษฐ์) (born 2 December 1971) is a Thai retired football defender who played for Thailand in the 1996 Asian Cup.

== International goals ==
#	Date	Venue	Opponent	Score	Result	Competition
1.	December 14, 1995	Chiang Mai, Thailand	Singapore	1-0	Win	SEA Games 1995
2.	March 9, 1997	Bangkok, Thailand	Hong Kong	2-0	Win	1998 FIFA World Cup qualification (AFC)
3.	August 29, 1998	Ho Chi Minh City, Vietnam	Philippines	3-1	Win	1998 Tiger Cup
4.	August 31, 1998	Ho Chi Minh City, Vietnam	Indonesia	3-2	Win	1998 Tiger Cup
5.	December 2, 1998	Bangkok, Thailand	Hong Kong	5-0	Win	1998 Asian Games
