= R. Sasikumar =

Singaporean footballer

Personal information
- Full name: Sasikumar s/o Ramu
- Date of birth: 5 March 1975 (age 51)
- Place of birth: Singapore
- Height: 1.93 m (6 ft 4 in)
- Position: Defender

Youth career
- 1994: Gibraltar Crescent

Senior career*
Years	Team	Apps	(Gls)
1995	Singapore FA		
1996	Singapore Armed Forces		
1996-1997	Geylang United		
1998-2001	Home United		
2002	Jurong Town		
2003	Tampines Rovers		
2004	Home United		

International career
1995–2000	Singapore	16	(1)
- * Club domestic league appearances and goals

Sasikumar s/o Ramu (born 5 March 1975) is a retired Singaporean footballer known for scoring the solitary goal to win his country the 1998 AFF Championship. He currently manages the Red Card Group, a sports marketing firm.

== Playing career ==
Sasikumar became famous after the final of the 1998 AFF Championship, when Singapore played against hosts Vietnam. In the 70th minute, he scored a goal with his shoulder, which was dubbed the "Shoulder of God", which won the Lions their first ever international title. He retired from international football after Singapore exited the 2000 AFF Championship from the group stage.

== International goals ==
No	Date	Venue	Opponent	Result	Competition
1	5 September 1998	Hanoi Stadium, Hanoi, Vietnam	Vietnam	0–1	1998 AFF Championship

== After football ==
After retiring from football, Sasikumar founded the Red Card Group, a sports marketing firm.

In 2017, Sasikumar expressed interest in contesting the elections for the Football Association of Singapore council but was not named as a candidate.

Sasikumar also bought Admiralty in the 2nd division of the Singapore National Football League.

== Honours ==
Geylang United

- S-League: 1996

Home United

- S.League: 1999
- Singapore Cup: 2000, 2001

Singapore

- Tiger Cup: 1998
