= Sarawut Kambua =

Thai footballer

Personal information
- Full name: Sarawut Kambua
- Date of birth: July 21, 1972 (age 54)
- Place of birth: Narathiwat, Thailand
- Height: 1.75 m (5 ft 9 in)
- Position: Goalkeeper

Senior career*
Years	Team	Apps	(Gls)
1999–2008	Krung Thai Bank	179	(0)
2009	Bangkok United	0	(0)
2010–2011	North Bangkok College		

International career
1997–1998	Thailand		
- * Club domestic league appearances and goals as of 14 November 2008

Sarawut Kambua is a retired professional footballer from Thailand. He played for Krung Thai Bank FC in the 2008 AFC Champions League group stages.

== Asian Champions League Appearances ==
#	Date	Venue	Opponent	Score	Result
1.	May 7, 2008	Kashima, Japan	Kashima Antlers	1-8	Lost
2.	May 21, 2008	Bangkok, Thailand	Beijing Guoan	5-3	Won
