= Nguyễn Phi Hùng =

Vietnamese singer and actor

Nguyễn Văn Phi Hùng
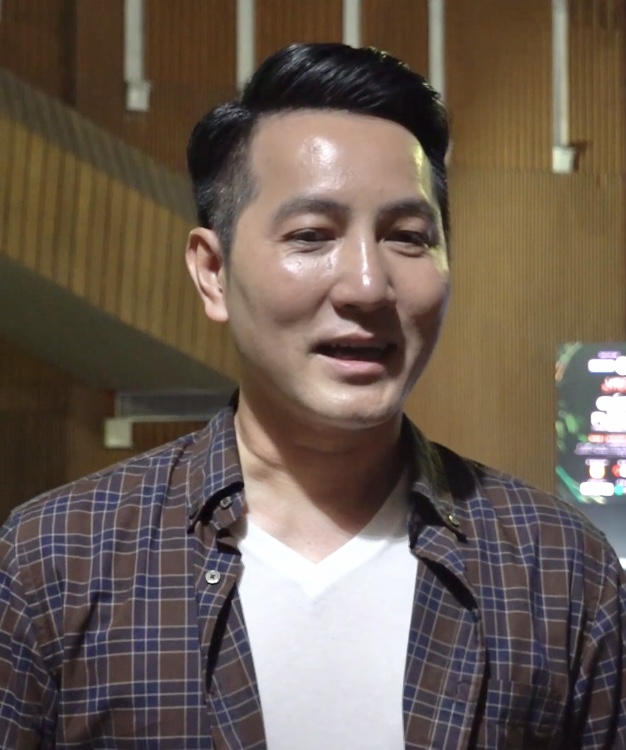

Background information
- Born: Nguyễn Văn Phi Hùng; 24 June 1977 (age 48); HaTinh, Vietnam
- Genres: Pop, Folk
- Occupations: Singer, songwriter
- Instrument: Vocals
- Years active: 1997–present

Nguyễn Văn Phi Hùng (born 24 June 1977), is a Vietnamese singer and doctor.

== Biography and career ==
Nguyễn Phi Hùng was guided by his parents to study dance from the age of 12. After finishing high school, he officially specialized in ballet and even received a scholarship to ease his family's financial burden. He graduated in ballet from the Vietnam Dance School in 1996 and worked at the Central Light Music and Dance Ensemble.

In 1998, Trần Văn Lai from the 30/10 Ballet Troupe in Ho Chi Minh City traveled to Hanoi to recruit performers, and Nguyễn Phi Hùng was among those selected. From 2000 onwards, he transitioned into the music industry with the support of his colleague, People's Artist Thái Đạt Minh. During a dance-teaching session for singers at the New Talent Center, Nguyễn Phi Hùng casually joined a karaoke gathering, where Thủy Nguyễn—who later became his manager—recognized his talent. He officially joined the New Talent entertainment company and swiftly held three solo live shows between 2000 and 2002.

He gained public attention after successfully performing songs such as Tình đơn côi, Mưa tuyệt vọng, Vắng cha, and Dáng em. He once won the title of "Promising Actor" at the Golden Kite Awards.

== Filmography ==
- Seagulls (Hải Âu)
- When Men Get Pregnant (Khi Đàn Ông Có Bầu)
- Xin Lỗi Tình Yêu (TV Mini-Series)
- Chiếc Giường Chia Đôi (TV Mini-Series)
- Mặt Nạ Máu
- Tiểu Tam Không Có Lỗi (TV Mini-Series)

== Awards ==
Year	Award	Category	Nominee / Work	Result	Ref
2004	Golden Kite Prize	Promising Actor	Hải Âu	Won	
