= Chaichan Kiewsen =

Thai footballer

Personal information
- Place of birth: Thailand
- Positions: Forward; striker

Senior career*
Years	Team	Apps	(Gls)
199?	Royal Thai Navy FC		

International career
199?	Thailand	??	(3)
- * Club domestic league appearances and goals

Chaichan Kiewsen (Thai: ชายชาญ เขียวเสน) is a Thai former footballer. He scored 3 goals for the Thai national team, including a goal in the 1997 SEA Games Final, and participated in the 1998 AFF Championship.

== International goals ==
#	Date	Venue	Opponent	Score	Result	Competition
1.	October 7, 1997	Jakarta, Indonesia	Brunei	6-0	Won	1997 Southeast Asian Games
2.	October 18, 1997	Jakarta, Indonesia	Indonesia	4-2 (pens)	Won	1997 Southeast Asian Games
3.	September 5, 1998	Ho Chi Minh City, Vietnam	Indonesia	4-5 (pens)	Lost	1998 Tiger Cup
