= Philippine Air Force F.C. =

Filipino association football club

Philippine Air Force
- Full name: Philippine Air Force Football Club
- Nickname: The Airmen
- Short name: PAF
- Founded: 1960; 66 years ago
- Owner: Philippine Air Force
- Head coach: SSG Erwin P. Oro
- League: Philippines Football League
- 2024: Philippines Football League, 13th of 15
| Home colours | Away colours |

Philippine Air Force Football Club is a football section of the Philippine Air Force. The club's original players were officers, enlisted personnel, and civilians. The club last competed in the Philippines Football League, the top tier of football in the Philippines.

Founded in 1960, the Philippine Air Force has won several trophies, including four national championships in the 1980s and 1990s. The club has also participated in the Asian Club Championship and the Asian Cup Winners' Cup.

Philippine Air Force was one of the founding members of the United Football League (UFL), the de facto top flight of Philippine football back then. They won the inaugural UFL Cup in 2009 and went on to win the inaugural season of the UFL in 2010, becoming the first Filipino club to win the double. They won their second UFL title in 2011 and their second UFL cup the following season. However, the club finished last in 2013 and was relegated to Division 2. They failed to earn promotion back to the top flight and eventually withdrew from the UFL after the 2014 season. After years of inactivity, the Philippine Air Force joined the short-lived top-flight Philippine Premier League (PPL) in 2019. After the PPL folded with a single match day, Air Force was absorbed into the revived Philippines Football League.

== History ==
=== Early years ===
Historically, the Philippine Air Force has been one of the most successful football clubs in the Philippines. The Air Force Team started way back in the 60s, along with the other armed forces teams in the Philippines – the Philippine Army and Philippine Navy football clubs. For the longest time, the various football teams of the Armed Forces of the Philippines were the best clubs in the country. They are the so-called "big three" of Philippine football. For three decades(the 1980s, 1990s, 2000s, and early 2010s), they have dominated the Philippine club footballing landscape; they won most of the major football tournaments in the country during that period. During the absence of a real professional football league, the armed forces teams allowed many talented local footballers to extend their careers as feeders for the national team.

Philippine Air Force first got promoted to the First Division in 1971, beating Araneta U in their Promotion playoff match during the 1970–71 PFA Cup major soccer series.

=== Glory years (1977–1993) ===
Philippine Air Force dethroned San Miguel Corp. Braves as the strongest team in the land in 1977. The Airmen were led by the swift forward Roberto Benavides, nicknamed Beep-beep Bitoy after a cartoon character, playmaker Polly Arenal and rugged defenders led by Eddie Dumago, Conrado Tolentino, Pepsi de la Cruz, and Pancho Zulla plus gusty goalkeeper Noe Doctora. Benavides was instrumental in starting the Air Force's championship tradition in the 1970s along with Doctora and de la Cruz; they led the Philippine Air Force team's first championships when the Airmen won back-to-back Lobregat Cup titles in 1977 and 1978. Since then, the Airmen have been a force to reckon with in local competitions. The Philippine Air Force team in the 80s was managed by Lopi Pascual, who became the Philippine Football Federation President. San Miguel pirated some Air Force players. Pascual and coach Bertie Guanzon, always looking for talent, found Elmer "Lacknet" Bedia, who scored the winning goal that stunned San Miguel in the 1979 National Cup at Ugarte Field in Makati. During the 1980 National League, Air Force was suspended for one year after a brawl with E Razon Inc.

As the economic recession hit in 1983, commercial teams folded, and the military, upon Pascual's urging, recruited top players to sustain competition. The military's presence and the later Coke Go For Goal Program sustained football. The Air Force squad reigned in the National Men's Open Championship five times in the '80s and '90s.

Philippine Air Force's Starting 11 during their championship run in the 1980s

The club participated in the 1993–94 edition of the Asian Cup Winners' Cup as the sole representative of the Philippines. The club, which qualified for the tournament as winners of the Ugarte Cup, was led by head coach Noel Casilao. They lose in the two-legged match against Japanese side Nissan with an aggregated score of 0–6. Their first match against the Japanese club was held in Japan, where they lost 0–5.

=== The Airmen during the sporadic years of the country's club football history(1995–2008) ===
There was the P-League that ran for three years in the late 1990s. The first one was held in Manila, which failed due to a lack of interest. It was moved to Davao, then Dumaguete, where it played to packed crowds. However, the lack of funds and corporate support eventually killed the fledging league.

The Airmen, then called the Eagles, also won the only edition of the Manila Premier Football League in 1997, beating the Philippine Army Tamaraws for the title. The only season of the semi-professional Manila Premier Football League was contested by eight clubs, namely Air Force Hawks, Army Tamaraws, Navy Dolphins FC, Alabang United, España United ("Tigers"), Loyola FC ("Falcons"), Mendiola United and Taft FC.

In 1999, 15 teams participated and played in Dumaguete during the second P-League relaunched. NCR-B, consisting of Navy and Air Force players, beat Davao in the final to win the title in the 3rd P-League edition.

In 2001, during the Army-Utilco Invitational Football Cup(1st edition), the Air Force beat Navy FC, 5–1, in their Third-place match. Also during that year, the Philippine Air Force pulled off an exciting 2–1 victory over the Navy to capture the Third Globe Super Cup football crown. The Airmen soared and banked on the heroics of national player Yanti Barsales in bagging the championship on top of the top cash prize ₱50,000. During that Globe Super Cup finals, Barsales received a 35-yard pass from a direct free kick by teammate Edsel Bracamonte, the enterprising striker booted in the marginal goal in the 75th minute from point-blank following a goalmouth scramble to seal the Seamen's fate.

In 2002, Philippine Air Force representing NCR lost in the PFF National Cup Finals 2–1 to a Negros Occidental FA representative team 2–1.

In 2003, Philippine Air Force avenged their loss to the Negros Occidental FA representative team, beating West Negros College – 1–0 in the Adidas Lightning Football National Finals held at the University of St. La Salle Football Field in Bacolod.

The Air Force did not join the Filipino Premier League in 2008, opting to stay at the Terry Razon Cup, which was similar to the FPL but had more teams with eleven. The PFF declared that the teams in the Terry Razon Cup could not play in the FPL (although the NCRFA, which ran the Razon Cup, allowed teams to cross). Rival Philippine Army won the only edition of the Filipino Premier League.

=== Philippine Air Force in the United Football League (2010–2014) ===
Philippine Air Force, which has carried the cudgels for the military squads after the decline of the Navy, won the United Football League Division 1 title in 2010 and 2011. They also won the cup competition, albeit by the skin of their teeth, winning the United Football League Cup crown in 2009 and 2011. Chieffy Caligdong and fellow Azkals veterans Yanti Bersales and Ian Araneta had continued the Air Force's championship tradition in recent years as they led PAF to its two UFL league titles and two United Football League Cup crowns. Philippine Air Force is one of the most successful clubs in the United Football League, having won 2 league championships and 2 UFL Cup trophies. The club's most recent success was its 2011 Campaign, which saw it as the Cup and League Champions in the UFL.

Philippine Air Force FC's Starting 11 in their 4–1–2–1–2 Formation, used during their championship run in the UFL

=== A period of rapid decline and inactivity (2012–2018) ===
When Philippine Air Force defeated the national team player-laden Loyola 2–0 during the 2011 UFL Cup Finals, Edmundo Mercado Jr., adjudged the tournament's best goalkeeper, defiantly and somewhat controversially proclaimed his side as "true Filipinos." The statement was about the rapid changes to the game on local soil, which, with the influx of foreign talent, has taken the shine off the homegrown player. In light of the rapid changes in the game in the Philippines, where Fil-foreigners and foreign players have taken the club scene by storm, the football teams of the Air Force, Army, and Navy have gone through a period of rapid decline.

Kaya thoroughly outplayed them during the 2012 UFL season opening day, and the 1-nil final score hardly began to tell that story. One week earlier, the Airmen were handed their butts by visiting Internacional de Madrid in a friendly match. Air Force was crater bombed 10-nil by the third division Spanish side.

In the 2013 season, Philippine Air Force FC finished last in the Division 1 table and was relegated to UFL Division 2 in 2014.

During the 2014 UFL Division 2 season, the Philippine Air Force was in third place but withdrew its participation in the UFL in the following season. The club enters a period of inactivity for the next four years.

=== Return to domestic football (2019–present) ===
Philippine Air Force returns to domestic league football in 2019. They joined the short-lived Philippines Premier League (PPL) Still, their eligibility to participate in the league was questioned when the Philippine Football Federation (PFF) initially denied giving them a license to participate in any competitions sanctioned by the National Football Association. They participated in a match against Mendiola as part of the PPL despite the PFF not allowing their inclusion in the PPL, which only had one match day before the PFF withdrew their league sanction due to management issues. The PFF decided to revive the Philippines Football League (PFL), which is set to commence in mid-May 2019.

Their licensing issues were resolved after the PFF gave them, along with Mendiola, provisional club license, allowing them to participate in the 2019 PFL season. They considered naming the Aboitiz field in Lipa, Batangas, as their home venue but decided to go for Cebu City instead.

After a three-year break hiatus, the Philippine Air Force announced the latest return for the 2023 Copa Paulino Alcantara.

Philippine Air Force would also return to the Philippines Football League for the 2024 season.

== Kit manufacturers and shirt sponsors ==
| Year(s) | Kit manufacturer(s) | Shirt partner(s) |
|---|---|---|
| 2009–11 | N/A | Rider |
| 2012 | Mizuno | Phoenix Petroleum |
| 2013 | | Philippine Air Force |
| 2014 | LGR Athletic | Philippine Air Force |
| 2019 | Defy Athletics | Elan Vita |
| 2024 | Chronos Athletics | Elan Vita |

=== Kit evolution ===
Home
| 2011 | 2012 | 2013–2014 |

Away
| 2011 | 2012 | 2013–2014 |

== Crest history ==
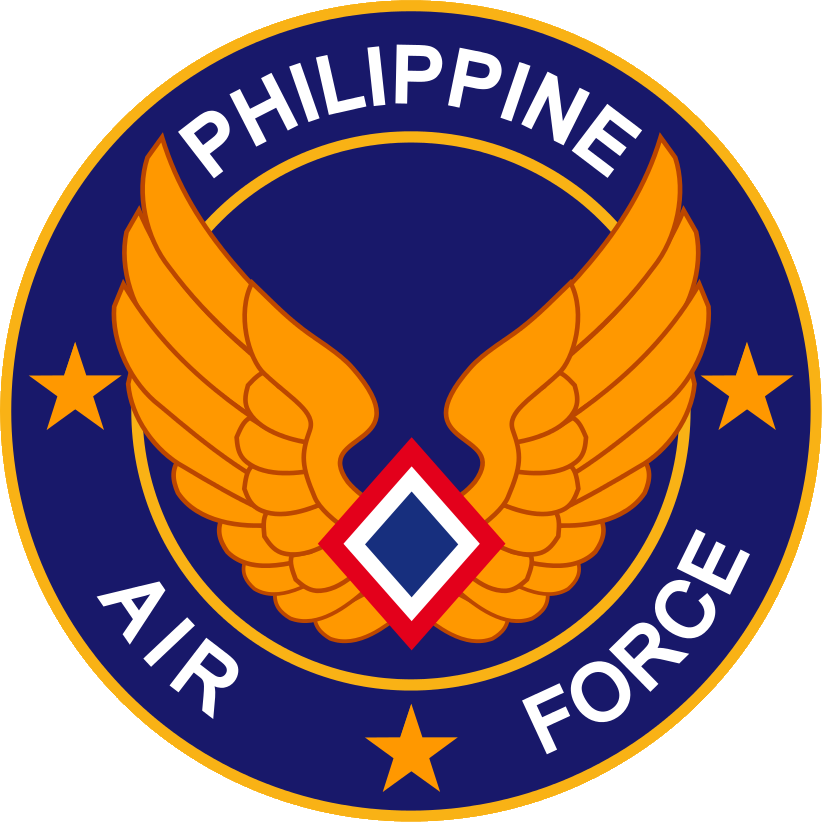
The original club crest, which is also the official Philippine Air Force insignia

Use as club crest in the 80s, which is also the official Philippine Air Force Military aircraft insignia

Club crest 2011–2023

== Head coaches ==
- (Philippines) Bertie Guanzon (1970s–1980s)
- (Philippines) Lope Pascual (1980s)
- (Philippines) Noel Casilao (1990s)
- (Philippines) Oscar Rabena (2011)
- (Philippines) Edzel Bracamonte (2011–2013)
- (Philippines) Leo Alfred Jaena (2013–2019)
- (Philippines) Joebel Bermejo (2023)
- (Philippines) Erwin Oro (2024)

== Notable players ==
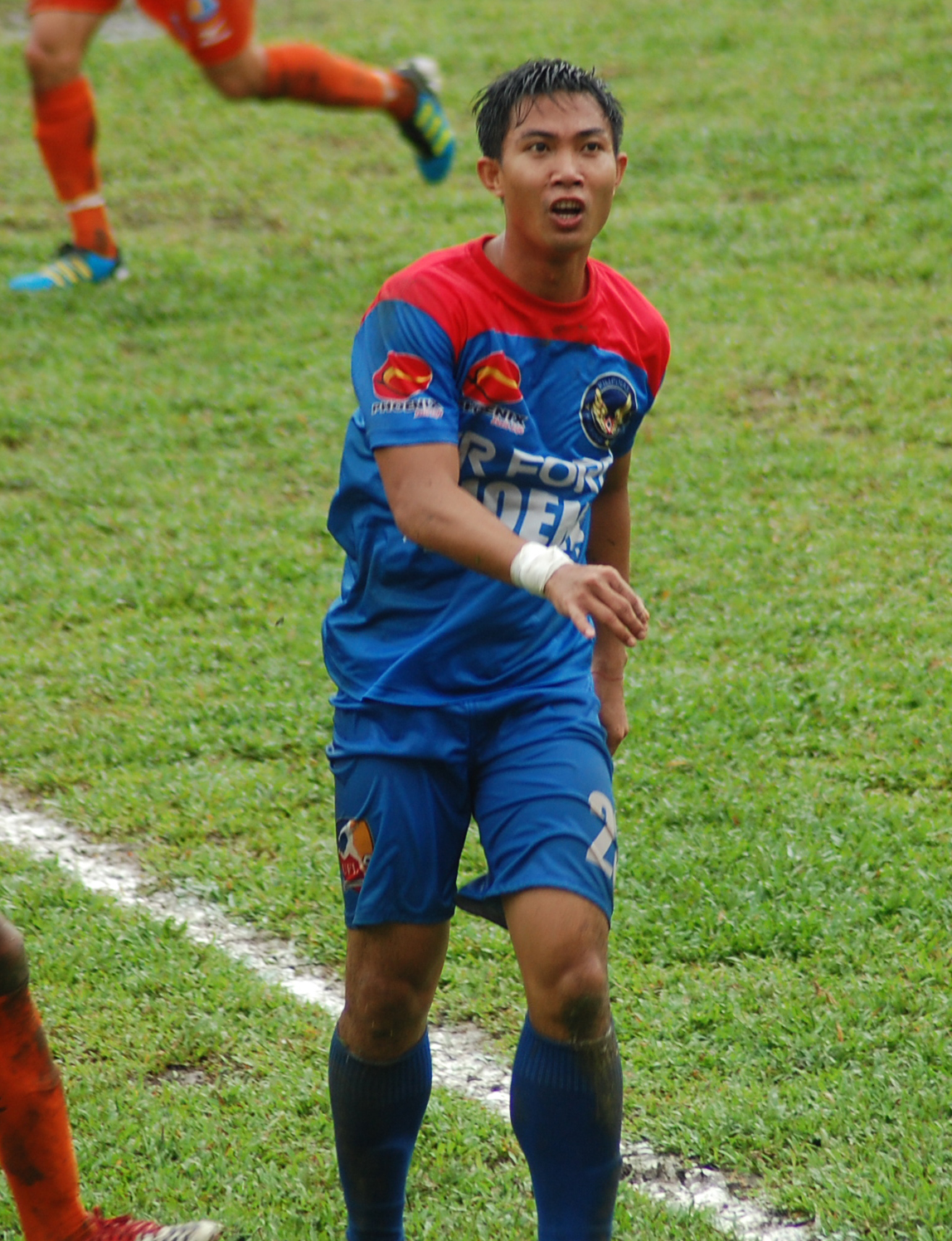
Ian Araneta, 2011 UFL Cup second-top scorer

- (Philippines) Mariano Araneta
- (Philippines) Elmer Bedia
- (Philippines) Rodolfo Alicante
- (Philippines) Raymund Tonog
- (Philippines) Ian Araneta
- (Philippines) Emelio Caligdong
- (Philippines) Yanti Barsales
- (Philippines) Edmundo Mercado

== Honors ==
=== Domestic competitions ===
==== League ====
- National League:

Winners (1) : 1982

- Manila Premier Football League:

Winners (1) : 1997

- P-League

Winners (1) : 1999^

- United Football League Division 1

Winners (2) : 2010, 2011

==== Cups ====
- Lobregat Cup:

Winners (2) : 1977, 1978

- National Cup Championships

Winners (3): 1982–83, 1985, 1989

- Ugarte Cup:

Winners (1): 1993

- Adidas Lightning Football National Tournament:

Winners (1): 2003

- UFL Cup

Winners (2): 2009, 2011

==== NCRFA tournaments ====
- NCR Open:

Winners (2) 1982, 1983

- Globe Super Cup:

Winners (1): 2001

^ Competed as NCR-B (Air Force and Navy combination)

== Records ==
| Season | Division | Tms. | Pos. | National cup | Lobregat Cup | NCRFA tournaments | UFL Cup | AFC ACC | AFC ACWC |
|---|---|---|---|---|---|---|---|---|---|
| 1960s | Not known | | | — | — | — | — | — | — |
| 1970/71 | 2 | 18 | 3rd (Pro) | — | — | — | — | — | — |
| 1972–1976 | Not known | | | — | — | — | — | — | — |
| 1977 | No national league | | | — | 1st | — | — | — | — |
| 1978 | No national league | | | — | 1st | — | — | — | — |
| 1978/79 | Not known | | | — | — | — | — | — | — |
| 1980 | Suspended for one year | | | — | — | — | — | — | — |
| 1980/81 | Not known | | | — | — | — | — | — | — |
| 1982 | 1 | — | 1st | — | — | 1st | — | — | — |
| 1983 | 1 | — | — | 1st | — | 1st | — | — | — |
| 1985 | 1 | — | — | 1st | — | — | — | — | — |
| 1986 | No competitions | | | — | — | — | — | — | — |
| 1987–1988 | Not known | | | — | — | — | — | — | — |
| 1989 | 1 | — | — | 1st | — | — | — | First round | — |
| 1990–1992 | No national league | | | — | — | — | — | — | — |
| 1993 | No national league | | | — | — | 1st | — | — | — |
| 1994 | No national league | | | — | — | — | — | — | First round |
| 1995 | Did not participate | | | — | — | — | — | — | — |
| 1996 | No national league | | | — | — | — | — | — | — |
| 1997 | 1 | 8 | 1st | — | — | — | — | — | — |
| 1998–2000 | Did not participate | | | — | — | — | — | — | — |
| 2001 | No national league | | | — | — | 1st | — | — | — |
| 2002 | No national league | | | 2nd | — | — | — | — | — |
| 2003 | No national league | | | 1st | — | — | — | — | — |
| 2004–2007 | No national league | | | — | — | — | — | — | — |
| 2008–09 | 1 | 8 | Did not participate | — | — | — | — | — | — |
| 2009 | No national league | | | — | — | — | 1st | — | — |
| 2010 | 1 | 8 | 1st | — | — | — | 2nd | — | — |
| 2011 | 1 | 7 | 1st | — | — | — | 1st | — | — |
| 2012 | 1 | 10 | 5th | — | — | — | Group stage | — | — |
| 2013 | 1 | 10 | 10th (Rel) | DNQ | — | — | — | — | — |
| 2014 | 2 | 12 | 3rd | — | — | — | — | — | — |
| 2015–2018 | Did not participate | | | — | — | — | — | — | — |
| 2019 | 1 | 7 | 6th | — | — | — | — | DNQ | — |
| 2020-2022 | Did not participate | | | — | — | — | — | — | — |
| 2023 | Did not participate | | | Group Stage | — | — | — | — | — |
| 2024 | 1 | 15 | 13th | — | — | — | — | — | — |

Key

- Tms. = Number of teams
- Pos. = Position in league
- Pro = Promoted
- Rel = Relegated
- TBD = To be determined
- DNQ = Did not qualify

Note: Performances of the club indicated here was after the UFL Division 1 created (as a semi-pro league) in 2009.

== Performance in AFC competitions ==
- Asian Club Championship: 1 appearance

1989–90: First round

| Season | Competition | Round | Nat. | Club | Score | Agg. / Pos. |
|---|---|---|---|---|---|---|
| 1989–90 | Asian Club Championship | First round | (Malaysia) | Kuala Lumpur FA | 0–6 | Group 5 (4th) |
| 1989–90 | Asian Club Championship | First round | (Singapore) | Geylang International | 0–3 | Group 5 (4th) |
| 1989–90 | Asian Club Championship | First round | (Brunei) | Muara Stars | 1–0 | Group 5 (4th) |
| 1989–90 | Asian Club Championship | First round | (Indonesia) | Pelita Jaya | 0–3 | Group 5 (4th) |

- Asian Cup Winners' Cup: 1 appearance

1993–94: First round

| Season | Competition | Round | Nat. | Club | Home | Away |
|---|---|---|---|---|---|---|
| 1993–94 | Asian Cup Winners' Cup | First round | (Japan) | Nissan | 0–5 | 0–1 |
