= Edmundo Mercado =

Filipino footballer (born 1974)

Personal information
- Full name: Edmundo Flores Mercado, Jr.
- Date of birth: June 7, 1974 (age 52)

Senior career*
Years	Team	Apps	(Gls)
c. 2011	Philippine Air Force F.C.		

International career
1996-2002	Philippines	18	(0)
c. 2013	Philippines (beach)		(0)
- * Club domestic league appearances and goals

Edmundo Flores Mercado, Jr. is a Filipino footballer.

He played for the Philippines national team as a goalkeeper. He was part of the squad that played at the 2002 ASEAN Football Championship. In 2011, Mercado played as a goalkeeper for Philippine Air Force F.C. at the UFL Cup.

Mercado was part of the Philippines national beach soccer team that participated at the Asian qualifiers of the 2013 FIFA Beach Soccer World Cup.
