= Yanti Barsales =

Filipino footballer (born 1973)

Personal information
- Full name: Yanti Armentia Barsales
- Date of birth: February 6, 1973 (age 53)
- Position: Forward

Senior career*
Years	Team	Apps	(Gls)
1994–2024	Philippine Air Force		

International career
1992–2011	Philippines	30	(1)
- * Club domestic league appearances and goals

Yanti Armentia Barsales (born February 6, 1973) is a Filipino footballer who plays as a forward. He currently is a free agent. He is notable for playing for Filipino club Philippine Air Force, in which he has played for over 29 years.

== Early life and education ==
Yanti Barsales was born on February 6, 1973, and grew up in Magpet, North Cotabato (now known as Cotabato). He would discover football when his family moved to Iloilo. He took up the sport when he was attending Iloilo State College of Fisheries (ISCF) in Tiwi, Barotac Nuevo, for his high school studies. He also simultaneously worked in the fishponds, improving his own physique at a young age.

== Club career ==
Barsales went on to play for the Barotac Nuevo team in the 1989 Coke Go-For-Goal national championship in the U16 division. His hometown team would reach the finals. Having a built more developed than his peers at the time, the rival team filed a formal protest against Barsales alleging he was overaged. The complaint was entertained but later dismissed. He would later help the Iloilo win the U19 Adidas Cup title and garnered the most valuable player award.

Barsales, would become an enlisted personnel of the Philippine Air Force (PAF) was part of its club. He played for Air Force from 1994 until his retirement from military service in 2022.

PAF would play in the de facto top-flight, United Football League (UFL). He helped the team clinch the 2011 UFL Cup title. He would also suit up for the team in their brief stint in the Philippines Football League (PFL) for the 2019 season.

By 2023, he is still part of Air Force which entered the 2023 Copa Paulino Alcantara

== International career ==
Barsales played for the Philippines national team from 1992 to 2011. At the 2002 FIFA World Cup qualifiers, Yanti Barsales made the first goal for the Philippines at a FIFA World Cup qualifier against Syria held in May 2001. He would be part of the Philippines roster for the 1998, 2000 and 2010 AFF Championships.

He retired from the national team in 2011 following the conclusion of the UFL Cup.

== International goals ==
Scores and results list the Philippines' goal tally first.

#	Date	Venue	Opponent	Score	Result	Competition
1.	4 May 2001	Al-Hamadaniah Stadium, Aleppo, Syria	Syria	1–2	1–5	2002 FIFA World Cup qualification

== Personal life ==
Barsales is married to Gemma Araneta with whom he has four children. Bersales in an Ilonggo which hails from Barotac Nuevo. In 2023, he was residing with his family in Angeles City. Other relatives involved in football are Ian Araneta and Jovin Bedic, his stepbrother and nephew respectively.
