= Singapore women's national football team results (unofficial matches) =

Football statistics

- Win Draw Loss

This article provides details of football games played by the Singapore women's national football team that, for various reasons, are not accorded the status of official International A Matches.

== Acronyms ==
Acronyms	Full Name
GS	Group stage
R32	Round of 32
R16	Round of 16
QF	Quarter-finals
SF	Semi-finals
3rd PO	Third place match/play-off
F	Final

== Results ==
=== 2001 ===
5 August 2001 Central Coast Women's Tournament	Australia U-19	10–0	Singapore	Gosford, Australia
		Report		Stadium: North Power Stadium

9 August 2001 Central Coast Women's Tournament	NSWIS (Australia)	4–0	Singapore	Gosford, Australia
		Report		Stadium: North Power Stadium

=== 2015 ===
7 July Luen Thai Cup	Singapore	0-2	South China Agricultural University	Hong Kong
19:30 UTC+8		Report		Stadium: Kowloon Bay Sports Ground
Note: Singapore Women's National Team

8 July Luen Thai Cup	Chelsea FC Soccer School	1-0	Singapore	Hong Kong
19:30 UTC+8		Report		Stadium: Kowloon Bay Sports Ground
Note: Singapore Women's National Team

9 July Luen Thai Cup	Singapore	2-0	Northern Mariana Islands	Hong Kong
19:30 UTC+8		Report		Stadium: Kowloon Bay Sports Ground
Note: Northern Mariana Islands team played under the label "CNMI Women's All-Stars" and their match vs Singapore is apparently not considered as a full international.

=== 2017 ===
30 Sep Friendly	Singapore	0-4	New Zealand Schools U18 Girls	Singapore
19:30 UTC+8		Report	Nicholson 28', 64' (pen.); Gray 40', 86'	Stadium: Jalan Besar Stadium
Note: Singapore Women's National Team

=== 2018 ===
26 May Training camp	Vietnam Under-19 XI	1-0	Singapore	Hanoi, Vietnam
16:00 UTC+7		Report		Stadium: VFF National Youth Training Centre
Note: Singapore Women's National Team

27 May Training camp	Hanoi Women’s FC	1-1	Singapore	Hanoi, Vietnam
16:00 UTC+7		Report		Stadium: VFF National Youth Training Centre
Note: Singapore Women's National Team

28 May Training camp	Vietnam Under-19	1-1	Singapore	Hanoi, Vietnam
16:00 UTC+7		Report		Stadium: VFF National Youth Training Centre
Note: Singapore Women's National Team

=== 2019 ===
29 April 2019 Arafura Games GS	Singapore	8-0	Timorese Fugees	Darwin, Australia
18:30 UTC+8		Report		Stadium: Darwin Football Stadium
Note: Singapore Women's National Team

30 April 2019 Arafura Games GS	NT Yapas	0-7	Singapore	Darwin, Australia
17:00 UTC+8		Report		Stadium: Darwin Football Stadium
Note: Singapore Women's National Team

1 May 2019 Arafura Games GS	Darwin Invitational	2-1	Singapore	Darwin, Australia
17:00 UTC+8		Report		Stadium: Darwin Football Stadium
Note: Singapore Women's National Team

2 May 2019 Arafura Games GS	Singapore	0-0	Koalas	Darwin, Australia
15:30 UTC+8		Report		Stadium: Darwin Football Stadium
Note: Singapore Women's National Team

3 May 2019 Arafura Games SF	Singapore	1-0	Darwin Invitational	Darwin, Australia
15:30 UTC+8		Report		Stadium: Darwin Football Stadium
Note: Singapore Women's National Team

3 May 2019 Arafura Games F	Koalas	3-0	Singapore	Darwin, Australia
15:30 UTC+8		Report		Stadium: Darwin Football Stadium
Note: Singapore Women's National Team
