= Thống Nhất Stadium =

Stadium in Ho Chi Minh City, Vietnam

Coordinates: 10°45′39″N 106°39′48″E

- Sân vận động Thống Nhất
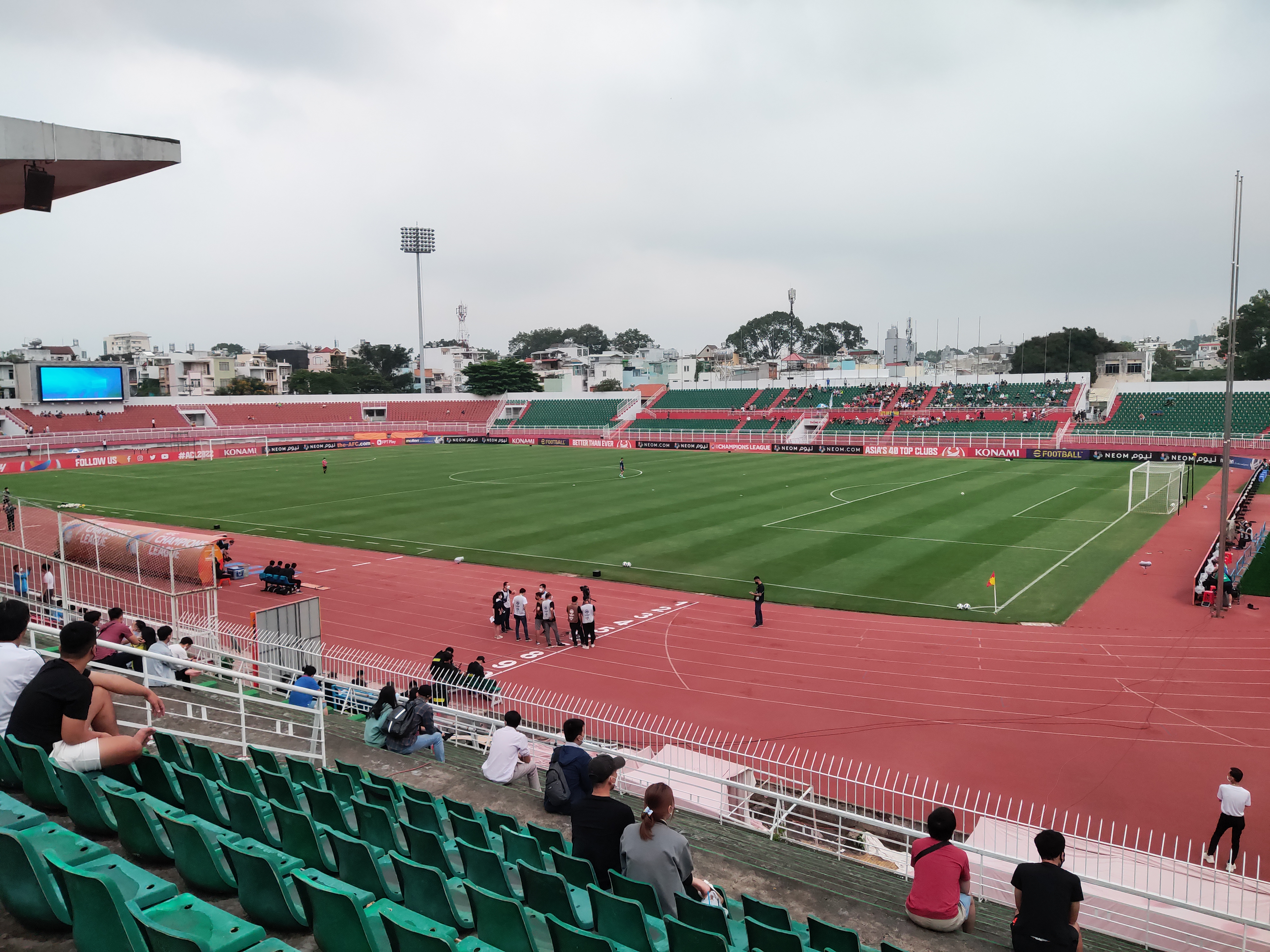
- Thống Nhất Stadium during the 2022 AFC Champions League
- Interactive map of Thống Nhất Stadium
- Full name: Thống Nhất Sports Center
- Former names: Renault Field (1929–1960); Cộng Hòa Stadium (1960–1975)
- Location: District 10, Ho Chi Minh City, Vietnam
- Owner: Vietnamese Government
- Operator: Ho Chi Minh City Department of Culture, Sports and Tourism
- Capacity: 14,400
- Field size: 100 by 68 metres (109.4 yd × 74.4 yd)

Construction
- Groundbreaking: 1929; 97 years ago
- Opened: October 18, 1931; 95 years ago
- Renovated: 1967–1968, 2002–2003, 2005–2007, 2017–2019
- Expanded: 1959–1960, 1990s

Tenants
- Cong An Ho Chi Minh City; Ho Chi Minh City (formerly); Mancons Saigon (2001–2018); Saigon (2016–2023); Vietnam national football team (Selected matches); Vietnam women's national football team

Thống Nhất Stadium (Vietnamese: Sân vận động Thống Nhất, lit. 'Unification Stadium'), formerly Cộng Hoà Stadium (Vietnamese: Sân vận động Cộng Hoà, lit. 'Republic Stadium') is the second-largest multi-purpose stadium in Ho Chi Minh City, and the oldest in Vietnam. It is located on 138 Đào Duy Từ Street, Diên Hồng.

The stadium is primarily used for football matches and is the home stadium of the Cong An Ho Chi Minh City FC of the V.League 1. The stadium has a capacity of 14,400.

== History ==
=== Early years ===
In 1929, the Chợ Lớn Municipal Commission decided to build a new stadium in the city. The stadium was named the Renault Field after the city commission's chairman at the time - Philippe Oreste Renault. The stadium was opened on October 18, 1931 following an inaugural football match between Cho Lon Police and Gia Dinh Stars with the Cho Lon side taking a 1-0 win. In its early day, the stadium only consisted of one 20-step spectators' stand, which was covered by a reinforced cement roof.

=== 1955 – 1975 ===
From 1959 to October 1960, new stands and a lighting system were added to the stadium while the main stand was expanded. This expansion increased the capacity of the stadium to 30,000 people. The stadium was then also renamed to Cộng Hòa Stadium (Vietnamese: Vận động trường Thống Nhất; lit. 'Republic Stadium'). It was renovated again in 1967.

Between 1955 and 1975, the site had witnessed a number of major sporting events including an over-capacity 30,000 strong crowd to watch the elimination football match between South Vietnam and South Korea leading up to the 1964 Summer Olympics. The Merdeka Cup gold trophy, won by South Vietnam in 1966, was kept at the stadium. Its whereabouts are not known after the Fall of Saigon.

During the Vietnam War, the stadium was also the scene of terror attacks by the Viet Cong. Explosives which detonated on October 4, 1965 killed 11 and injured 42 others.

=== Post-1975 ===
On September 2, 1975, the stadium was renamed Thống Nhất Stadium ("Reunification Stadium") after a football match between Hải Quan F.C. and Ngân Hàng F.C. took place.

The stadium has been the home stadium to Hồ Chí Minh City F.C. (formerly known as Saigon Port F.C.) since the club's formation in 1975. Between 1995 and 2002, it was also the home ground to Hồ Chí Minh City Police F.C.

In 2002, renovation was done to prepare the stadium to host Group B men's football matches at the 2003 Southeast Asian Games. It was usually home to Vietnam national football team alongside Hàng Đẫy Stadium in Hanoi until 2003 when Mỹ Đình National Stadium was completed.

In 2016, Sài Gòn F.C. selected Thong Nhat as the home stadium for their first season in V.League 1.

Until 2017, the stadium has a capacity of 19,450 people. Since then, the stadium has been renovated in phases. In the first phase, the A1 and A2 sections of the main stand were repainted and a new 1500-lux floodlight system was installed in the last quarter of 2017. In 2018, the playing field was redone and more than 6,700 seats were added to the B, C and D stands. This reduced the capacity of the stadium to approximately 15,000 people. In 2019, existing seats in stand A will be replaced while new seats will be added to the east and west wings of the stand (A4 and A5).

To prepare for the 2026 Vietnam National Games, grandstand B will be completely renovated, which will add 4,500 seats and bring the total capacity of the stadium to 19,000. The renovation is expected to cost 149 billion VND (US$6.1 million).

== Usage ==
The stadium has hosted various domestic and international sporting and entertainment events throughout its history. Some of the most events are listed below

=== Football ===
- 1964 AFC Youth Championship
- 1998 AFF Championship
- 2003 Southeast Asian Games (men's football)
- 2008 AFC Women's Asian Cup
- 2010 AFF U-19 Youth Championship
- 2011 AFC U-19 Women's Championship
- 2012 AFF U-19 Youth Championship
- 2012 AFF Women's Championship
- 2014 AFC Women's Asian Cup
- 2015 AFF Women's Championship

=== Athletics ===
- 2016 Asian Junior Athletics Championships

=== Concerts ===
- The Wild Dreams Tour (Westlife)

== International football matches ==
Date	Competition	Team 1	Res.	Team 2
29 January 1999	1999 Dunhill Cup	Vietnam	1–0	Singapore
29 January 1999	1999 Dunhill Cup	Russia	2–0	Iran
30 January 1999	1999 Dunhill Cup	Malaysia	1–1	Bulgaria
31 January 1999	1999 Dunhill Cup	South Korea	2–1	China
31 January 1999	1999 Dunhill Cup	Vietnam	1–0	Russia
31 January 1999	1999 Dunhill Cup	Iran	5–0	Singapore
1 February 1999	1999 Dunhill Cup	South Korea	3–0	Malaysia
1 February 1999	1999 Dunhill Cup	China	2–1	Bulgaria
2 February 1999	1999 Dunhill Cup	Singapore	1–1	Russia
2 February 1999	1999 Dunhill Cup	Iran	2–2	Vietnam
3 February 1999	1999 Dunhill Cup	Bulgaria	1–5	South Korea
3 February 1999	1999 Dunhill Cup	China	7–1	Malaysia
5 February 1999	1999 Dunhill Cup semi-finals	Vietnam	1–4	China
5 February 1999	1999 Dunhill Cup semi-finals	South Korea	2–0	Iran
7 February 1999	1999 Dunhill Cup final	China	0–1	South Korea
23 January 2000	2000 AFC Asian Cup qualification	Vietnam	11–0	Guam
26 January 2000	2000 AFC Asian Cup qualification	Vietnam	3–0	Philippines
29 January 2000	2000 AFC Asian Cup qualification	Vietnam	0–2	China
20 August 2004	2004 LG Cup	Vietnam	5–0	Myanmar
22 August 2004	2004 LG Cup	India	2–1	Myanmar
24 August 2004	2004 LG Cup	Vietnam	2–1	India
8 September 2004	2006 FIFA World Cup qualification – AFC second round	Vietnam	1–2	South Korea
7 December 2004	2004 AFF Championship	Laos	0–6	Indonesia
7 December 2004	2004 AFF Championship	Vietnam	1–1	Singapore
9 December 2004	2004 AFF Championship	Vietnam	9–1	Cambodia
9 December 2004	2004 AFF Championship	Indonesia	0–0	Singapore
1 October 2008	2008 Ho Chi Minh City Cup	Vietnam	2–3	Myanmar
3 October 2008	2008 Ho Chi Minh City Cup	Myanmar	1–2	Turkmenistan
5 October 2008	2008 Ho Chi Minh City Cup	Vietnam	2–3	Turkmenistan
20 October 2009	2009 Ho Chi Minh City Cup	Vietnam	1–0	Turkmenistan
22 October 2009	2009 Ho Chi Minh City Cup	Singapore	4–2	Turkmenistan
24 October 2009	2009 Ho Chi Minh City Cup	Vietnam	2–2	Singapore
29 June 2011	Friendly	Vietnam	6–0	Macau
23 June 2012	Friendly	Vietnam	1–0	Mozambique
24 October 2012	2012 VFF Cup	Vietnam	0–1	Turkmenistan
26 October 2012	2012 VFF Cup	Vietnam	4–0	Laos
28 October 2012	2012 VFF Cup	Turkmenistan	4–2	Laos
6 October 2015	Friendly	Vietnam	5–2	North Korea
13 June 2017	2019 AFC Asian Cup qualification – third round	Vietnam	0–0	Jordan
1 June 2022	Friendly	Vietnam	2–0	Afghanistan
21 September 2022	2022 VFF Tri-Nations Series	Vietnam	4–0	Singapore
24 September 2022	2022 VFF Tri-Nations Series	India	1–1	Singapore
27 September 2022	2022 VFF Tri-Nations Series	Vietnam	3–0	India
14 October 2025	2027 AFC Asian Cup qualification – third round	Nepal (Note: Stadiums in Nepal do not meet AFC requirements, Nepal will be required to play their home matches at a neutral venue.)	0–1	Vietnam

== Notes ==
Preceded by Hindmarsh Stadium (Australia) Adelaide	AFC Women's Asian Cup; Host Venue; 2008	Succeeded by Chengdu Sports Center (China) Chengdu
Preceded by Chengdu Sports Center (China) Chengdu	AFC Women's Asian Cup; Host Venue; 2014	Succeeded by Amman International Stadium (Jordan) Amman
