= Mursyid Effendi =

Indonesian footballer (born 1972)

Personal information
- Date of birth: 23 April 1972 (age 54)
- Place of birth: Indonesia
- Position: Defender

Senior career*
| Years | Team | Apps | (Gls) |
| 1994–2007 | Persebaya Surabaya | 298 | (38) |
| 2007 | Persiku Kudus | | |

International career
| 1998 | Indonesia | 5 | (0) |
- * Club domestic league appearances and goals

Mursyid Effendi (born 23 April 1972) is an Indonesian football coach and former player who played as a defender. He currently works as a coach at Liga 4 (Indonesia) club Persiga Trenggalek.

== Club career ==
Effendi played club football for Persebaya Surabaya between 1994 and 2007, winning two Liga Indonesia Premier Division titles and two Liga Indonesia First Division titles with the club. He was banned from playing for Persebaya Surabaya during the 1998–99 season for intentionally scoring an own goal while playing for Indonesia.

He joined Persiku Kudus in 2007 and retired at the end of the year.

== International career ==
In 1998, Effendi earned a total of five caps for the Indonesia national team. He debuted during the 1998 AFF Championship on 27 August 1998 during the 3–0 victory against the Philippines.

On 31 August 1998, while playing for Indonesia in the third 1998 AFF Championship group match against Thailand, Effendi deliberately scored an own goal to affect the outcome of the match; he was banned for life from international football by FIFA after the conclusion of the tournament.

Despite the controversial own goal, he still won a bronze medal with Indonesia during the 1998 AFF Championship.

== Coaching career ==
Effendi has been the assistant coach of several Indonesian clubs such as Persida Sidoarjo, Porda Surabaya, Mitra Surabaya, Persidafon Dafonsoro and Persebaya IPL.

He became a coach at Persiga Trenggalek in 2021.

== Career statistics ==
=== International ===
Appearances and goals by national team and year
| National team | Year | Apps | Goals |
|---|---|---|---|
| Indonesia | 1998 | 5 | 0 |
| Total | | 5 | 0 |

== Honours ==
Persebaya Surabaya

- Liga Indonesia Premier Division: 1996–97, 2004
- Liga Indonesia First Division: 2003, 2006
- Piala Gubernur Jatim: 2006

Indonesia

- AFF Championship third place: 1998
