= Gusta Guzarishah =

Singaporean footballer

Personal information
- Full name: Miram Shah Gusta Guzarishah
- Date of birth: 29 April 1976 (age 50)
- Place of birth: Singapore
- Positions: Midfielder; winger; forward

Senior career*
Years	Team	Apps	(Gls)
-2001	Home United FC		
2003	Sembawang Rangers FC		
2003	Jurong FC		
2004	Warriors FC		

International career
1998-2003	Singapore	17	(0)
- * Club domestic league appearances and goals

Gusta Guzarishah (born 29 April 1976 in Singapore) is a former Singaporean footballer.
