= Imam Riyadi =

Indonesian footballer

Imam Riyadi is an Indonesian former footballer who played as a midfielder for Indonesian side Persib Bandung. He was described as having "intelligence when passing the ball" and being "very good at managing the tempo of the game"; he was also described as having successful "dead ball execution".

Riyadi is married and has three children.
