= Klairung Treejaksung =

Thai footballer and coach

Personal information
- Full name: Klairung Treejaksung
- Date of birth: April 20, 1973 (age 53)
- Place of birth: Bangkok, Thailand
- Height: 1.75 m (5 ft 9 in)
- Position: Forward

Youth career
- 1992–1994: Bangkok Bank

Senior career*
Years	Team	Apps	(Gls)
1995–2006	Bangkok Bank	224	(61)
2007–2009	Bangkok FC	37	(8)
Total		261	(69)

International career
1998–2000	Thailand	22	(4)

Managerial career
- 2011: Rajpracha
- 2016: Kasetsart
Medal record
Thailand national football team
Sea Games
Gold medal – first place	Sea Games 2013	Assistant Coach
ASEAN Football Championship
Winner	ASEAN Football Championship 2014	Assistant Coach
- * Club domestic league appearances and goals as of 18 July 2008

Klairung Treejaksung (Thai: ใกล้รุ่ง ตรีจักรสังข์) is a Thai football coach and former Thailand national football team player. He is currently the assistant head coach of Kasetsart F.C.
