= Kovid Foythong =

Thai footballer (born 1974)

Personal information
- Full name: Kovid Foythong
- Date of birth: 20 April 1974 (age 52)
- Place of birth: Udon Thani, Thailand
- Height: 1.71 m (5 ft 7 1/2 in)
- Positions: Left back; left midfielder

Senior career*
Years	Team	Apps	(Gls)
1998–1999	SV Lohhof	1	(0)
2000–2002	Osotspa		
2003–2004	Krung Thai Bank		

International career
1992–2000	Thailand	7	(0)
- * Club domestic league appearances and goals as of 18 July 2008

Kovid Foythong (Thai: โกวิทย์ ฝอยทอง; born 20 April 1974) is a Thai former football player. He was a defender with the national team from 1992 to 2000. Besides Thailand, he has played in Germany.

He played for Thailand in a few 1994 FIFA World Cup qualifying matches.
