= Rafi Ali =

Singaporean footballer and coach

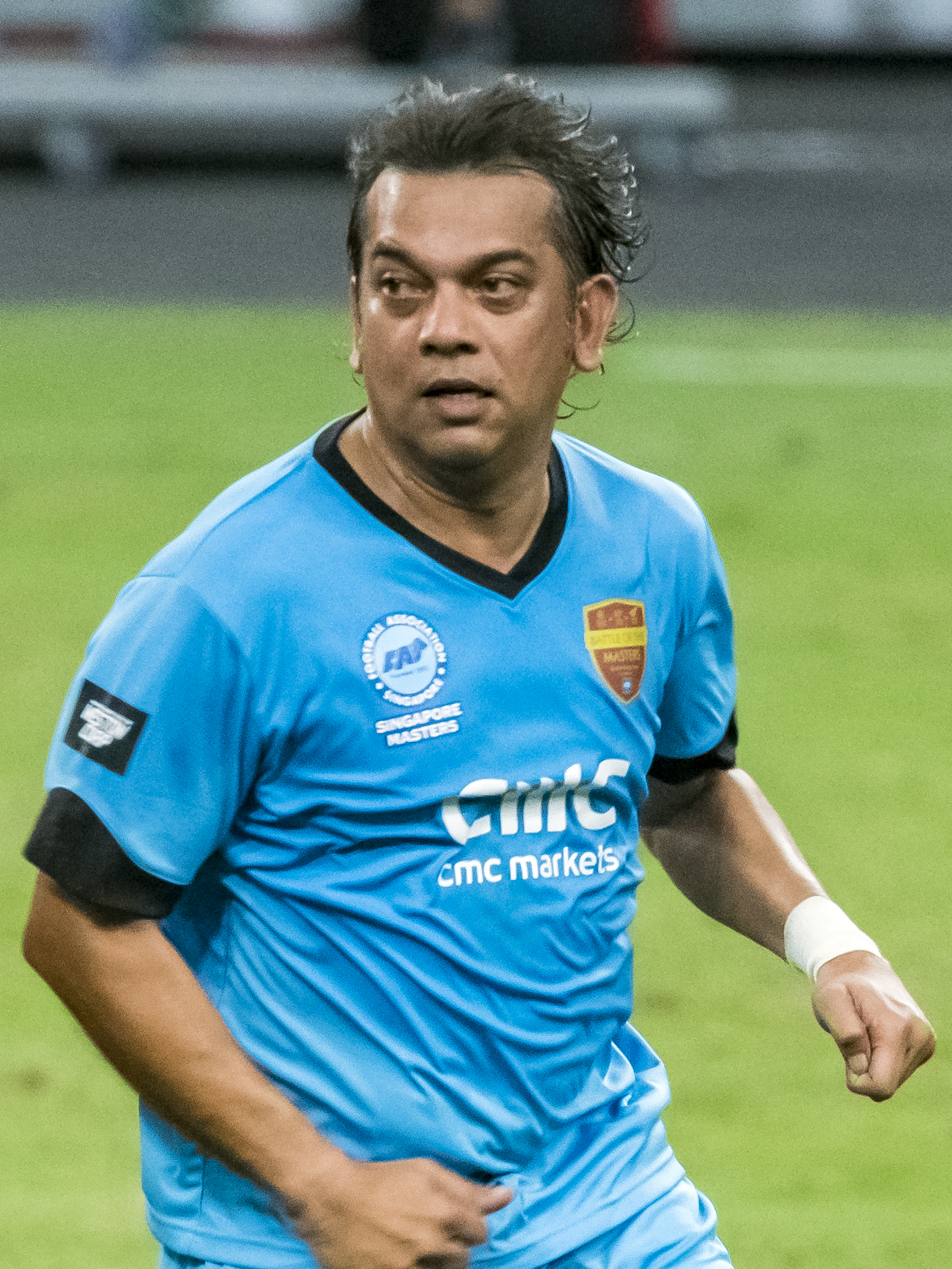
- Rafi Ali in a friendly in 2017

Personal information
- Full name: Mohammed Rafi bin Ali
- Date of birth: 11 December 1972 (age 53)
- Place of birth: Singapore
- Height: 1.79 m (5 ft 10 1/2 in)
- Position: Central midfielder

Youth career
- 1989–1992: Geylang United

Senior career*
Years	Team	Apps	(Gls)
1992–1995	Geylang United	32	(6)
1994	Singapore FA	24	(9)
1996–1997	Tampines Rovers	21	(1)
1998	Geylang United	12	(3)
1999–2002	Singapore Armed Forces	62	(10)
2003	Jurong FC		
2003–2008	Tampines Rovers		
Total		245	(69)

International career
1993–2003	Singapore	76	(16)

Managerial career
- 2014: Tampines Rovers
- * Club domestic league appearances and goals

Mohammed Rafi bin Ali (born 11 December 1972) is a former Singaporean footballer and coach. He is part of the Singapore national football team that won the 1998 Tiger Cup. He started his career with Geylang United. His preferred playing position is either as sweeper or playmaker.

Rafi Ali is now working on the Rafi Ali Soccer School for kids. He is also coaching Republic Polytechnic's Male football IG team.

== Coaching career ==
On 27 April 2014, Rafi was appointed head coach of Tampines Rovers following the resignation of Salim Moin. He led the team as interim head coach until the end of the season.

== International goals ==
No	Date	Venue	Opponent	Score	Result	Competition
1	18 April 1993	Khalifa International Stadium, Al Rayyan, Qatar	Indonesia	0–1	0–2	1994 FIFA World Cup qualification
2	28 April 1993	Singapore National Stadium, Kallang, Singapore	Vietnam	0–1	0–1	1994 FIFA World Cup qualification
3	22 May 2001	Bishan Stadium, Bishan, Singapore	New Zealand	2–0	3–0	Friendly

== Honours ==
=== Domestic ===
League

- S.League: 2

- 2004, 2005

Cups

- Singapore Cup: 2

- 2004, 2006

=== ASEAN competition ===
- ASEAN Club Championship: 1

- 2005

=== International ===
Singapore

- ASEAN Football Championship: 1998
- Malaysia Premier League: 1994
- Malaysia Cup: 1994
