= List of Indonesia international footballers =

Abdul Kadir is Indonesia's most-capped player ever and also its all-time top scorer. He later served as manager for the national team in 1989

The Indonesian men's national football team has represented Indonesia in international men's football matches since 1945. The men's national team is controlled by the Football Association of Indonesia (PSSI), the governing body for football in Indonesia, which is a part of AFC, under the jurisdiction of FIFA.

Abdul Kadir is a football player who holds the record for being both the all-time leading goal scorer and the player with the most appearances for the Indonesian national team. Throughout his career, he achieved 111 appearances and scored 70 goals, establishing himself as an iconic figure in the history of Indonesian football. In second place, Iswadi Idris recorded 97 appearances and netted 55 goals for the national team. Both players are recognized for their significant contributions to strengthening the national team and serving as inspirations for the development of football in Indonesia.

The following list of Indonesian international footballers covers all football players with 10 or more official caps for the Indonesian men's national football team as recorded by the Football Association of Indonesia and football statistic organisations RSSSF. The players are listed here sorted first by the total number of caps, and then by number of goals.

== Key ==
Player
This colour background and the * symbol indicate that the player was active at club level as at the date specified above.

Positions key
Pre-1960s		1960s–	
GK	Goalkeeper		
FB	Full back	DF	Defender
HB	Half back	MF	Midfielder
FW	Forward		

Position
Playing positions are listed according to the tactical formations that were employed at the time. Thus the change in the names of defensive and midfield positions reflects the tactical evolution that occurred from the 1960s onwards.
Caps and goals
Caps and goals comprise those in the FIFA World Cup and AFC Asian Cup, their associated qualification matches, and international friendly tournaments and matches.

== List of players ==
As of 5 October 2026.

Indonesia national team football players with at least 10 appearances
Player	Pos.	Caps	Goals	Debut		Last or most recent match	
Player	Pos.	Caps	Goals	Year	Opponent	Year	Opponent
Abdul Kadir (Note: National team joint-manager in 1989.)	FW	111	70	1967	South Korea	1979	North Korea
Iswadi Idris (Note: National team manager in two different spells; from 1982 to 1983 and joint-manager in 1989.)	FW	97	55	1968	Singapore	1980	South Korea
Bambang Pamungkas	FW	86	38	1999	Lithuania	2012	Singapore
Kainun Waskito	FW	80	31	1967	South Korea	1977	Thailand
Jacob Sihasale	FW	70	23	1966	Singapore	1974	Uruguay
Firman Utina	MF	66	5	2002	Cambodia	2014	Laos
Soetjipto Soentoro	FW	61	37	1965	Sri Lanka	1970	Thailand
Ponaryo Astaman	MF	61	2	2003	Malaysia	2013	Saudi Arabia
Rizky Ridho	DF	61	4	2021	Oman	2026	Thailand
Hendro Kartiko	GK	60	0	1996	Kuwait	2011	Iran
Kurniawan Dwi Yulianto	FW	59	33	1995	Thailand	2005	Australia
Risdianto	FW	59	27	1971	India	1981	Singapore
Bima Sakti (Note: National team caretaker manager in 2018.)	MF	58	12	1995	Thailand	2001	China
Fachruddin Aryanto	DF	57	4	2012	Philippines	2023	Brunei
Agung Setyabudi	DF	57	1	1993	Qatar	2004	Bahrain
Henky Timisela	FW	55	23	1958	East Germany	1962	South Vietnam
Widodo Cahyono Putro	FW	55	14	1991	Malaysia	1999	Cambodia
Elie Aiboy	MF	54	8	2001	China	2012	Malaysia
Robby Darwis	DF	54	6	1983	Singapore	1997	Vietnam
Pratama Arhan	DF	54	3	2021	Afghanistan	2024	Philippines
Ismed Sofyan	DF	53	3	2000	Myanmar	2010	Australia
Judo Hadianto	GK	53	0	1962	Thailand	1974	Denmark
Eddy Harto	GK	53	0	1988	Thailand	1993	Qatar
Boaz Solossa	FW	50	14	2004	Saudi Arabia	2018	Mauritius
Asnawi Mangkualam	DF	50	2	2017	Myanmar	2024	Philippines
Nur'alim	DF	50	0	1996	Ghana	2003	Yemen
Witan Sulaeman	MF	49	9	2021	Afghanistan	2024	Japan
Djunaidy Abdillah	FW	48	17	1967	South Korea	1977	Singapore
Bejo Sugiantoro	DF	48	2	1997	Uzbekistan	2004	Turkmenistan
Uston Nawawi	MF	47	13	1997	Tanzania	2004	Saudi Arabia
Budi Sudarsono	FW	46	16	2001	Maldives	2010	Australia
Ricky Kambuaya	MF	46	5	2021	Taiwan	2025	Iraq
Rochy Putiray	FW	44	17	1991	Kenya	2004	Bahrain
Evan Dimas	MF	44	10	2014	Timor-Leste	2022	Timor-Leste
Purwono	GK	44	0	1983	Malaysia	1988	Malaysia
Muhammad Ridwan	DF	43	5	2006	Malaysia	2014	Laos
Thio Him Tjiang	FB	43	2	1954	Yugoslavia	1962	China
Fakhri Husaini	MF	42	14	1988	Singapore	1997	Thailand
Irfan Bachdim	MF	42	13	2010	Timor-Leste	2019	Vietnam
Ricky Yacobi	FW	42	11	1983	Thailand	1993	Singapore
Aji Santoso (Note: National team caretaker manager in 2012.)	DF	41	7	1991	Singapore	2000	Thailand
Muhammad Roby	DF	41	1	2007	Syria	2014	Philippines
Marselino Ferdinan	MF	41	5	2022	Timor-Leste	2026	Mozambique
Herry Kiswanto	DF	40	3	1981	Thailand	1993	Singapore
Tan Ling Houw	MF	38	6	1951	Burma	1962	South Vietnam
Rully Nere	MF	38	1	1979	Burma	1989	Thailand
Markus Horison	GK	37	0	2007	Hong Kong	2012	Philippines
Egy Maulana Vikri	MF	37	9	2018	Iceland	2026	Thailand
Dede Sulaeman	FW	36	9	1978	Thailand	1985	Malaysia
Aples Tecuari	DF	36	2	1996	Ghana	2004	Turkmenistan
Charis Yulianto	DF	36	2	2004	Saudi Arabia	2010	Australia
Yakob Sayuri	MF	35	3	2021	Afghanistan	2026	Oman
Sudirman	DF	34	4	1991	Malta	1997	Yemen
Syamsul Chaeruddin	MF	34	0	2004	Malaysia	2009	Australia
Stefano Lilipaly	DF	34	3	2013	Philippines	2025	Lebanon
Rahmad Darmawan (Note: National team caretaker manager in 2013.)	MF	33	1	1988	Malaysia	1994	Singapore
Ivar Jenner	MF	33	0	2023	Palestine	2026	Thailand
Cristian Gonzáles	FW	32	13	2010	Timor-Leste	2015	Myanmar
Wowo Sunaryo	FW	32	9	1958	Burma	1963	North Korea
Isnan Ali	DF	32	0	2001	Cambodia	2010	Oman
Hamka Hamzah	DF	32	0	2004	Malaysia	2014	Cambodia
Elkan Baggott	DF	32	3	2021	Afghanistan	2026	Thailand
Zulham Zamrun	FW	31	7	2011	Saudi Arabia	2016	Thailand
Ronny Pattinasarany	DF	31	6	1973	Bulgaria	1981	New Zealand
Rachmat Irianto	DF	31	3	2021	Afghanistan	2024	Philippines
Andik Vermansah	MF	31	2	2012	Vietnam	2019	United Arab Emirates
Anang Ma'ruf	DF	31	1	1995	Malaysia	2000	Myanmar
Ronny Pasla	GK	31	0	1967	Bulgaria	1979	Denmark
Zulkifli Syukur	DF	31	0	2010	Timor-Leste	2014	Laos
Saddil Ramdani	MF	31	2	2017	Myanmar	2026	Singapore
Andi Lala	FW	30	9	1971	Brunei	1979	North Korea
Ansyari Lubis	MF	30	8	1995	Thailand	1997	Thailand
Anjas Asmara	FW	30	5	1973	Bulgaria	1977	Denmark
Maulwi Saelan	GK	30	0	1956	Yugoslavia	1961	China
Maman Abdurrahman	DF	30	0	2004	Malaysia	2010	Malaysia
Jaya Hartono	DF	29	1	1986	Paraguay	1996	India
Ahmad Bustomi	MF	29	0	2010	Uruguay	2018	Syria
Oktovianus Maniani	FW	28	3	2010	Uruguay	2013	Iraq
Zaenal Arief	FW	27	13	2002	Singapore	2007	Liberia
Timo Kapisa	FW	27	6	1976	South Korea	1979	Singapore
Eko Purdjianto	DF	27	3	1999	Lithuania	2001	China
Marzuki Nyak Mad	DF	27	0	1984	Thailand	1988	South Korea
Marc Klok	MF	27	5	2022	Bangladesh	2026	Singapore
Azhari Rangkuti	MF	26	0	1984	Thailand	1989	Thailand
Rizky Pora	FW	26	1	2014	Pakistan	2019	Malaysia
Rafael Struick	FW	26	1	2023	Palestine	2025	Australia
Beny Wahyudi	DF	26	0	2010	Uruguay	2017	Cambodia
Nadeo Argawinata	GK	26	0	2021	Oman	2026	Vietnam
Sandy Walsh	DF	26	4	2023	Turkmenistan	2026	Timor-Leste
Omo Suratmo	FW	25	21	1957	Thailand	1961	Yugoslavia
Eka Ramdani	MF	25	1	2006	Malaysia	2011	Jordan
Ricardo Salampessy	DF	25	1	2006	Malaysia	2014	Qatar
Agus Firmansyah	DF	25	0	2002	Cambodia	2007	Singapore
Jordi Amat	DF	25	1	2022	Cambodia	2026	Vietnam
Justin Hubner	DF	25	2	2024	Libya	2026	Thailand
Thom Haye	MF	25	3	2024	Vietnam	2026	Thailand
Patar Tambunan	DF	24	2	1984	Thailand	1989	Thailand
Kurnia Sandy	GK	24	0	1995	Thailand	1998	Singapore
Supardi Nasir	DF	24	0	2006	Singapore	2014	Laos
Ragnar Oratmangoen	FW	24	5	2024	Vietnam	2026	Thailand
Tee San Liong	FW	23	8	1951	India	1960	Pakistan
Samsul Arif	FW	23	4	2011	Iran	2014	Philippines
Bayu Pradana	MF	23	0	2016	Malaysia	2019	Malaysia
Irfan Jaya	FW	22	6	2018	Mauritius	2022	Nepal
Hariono	MF	22	1	2008	Yemen	2015	Myanmar
Kwee Kiat Sek	HB	22	0	1951	Yugoslavia	1958	China
Arif Suyono	FW	21	4	2008	Yemen	2010	Malaysia
Raphael Maitimo	MF	21	4	2012	Laos	2015	Myanmar
Maman Suryaman	MF	21	2	1989	Singapore	1991	Thailand
Ferril Hattu	DF	21	1	1985	India	1992	Malaysia
Ardi Warsidi	DF	21	0	1999	Brunei	2004	Singapore
Gendut Doni Christiawan	FW	20	9	2000	Myanmar	2004	Singapore
Aang Witarsa	FW	20	4	1951	Yugoslavia	1959	PR Croatia
Muhammad Ilham	FW	20	3	2008	Cambodia	2011	Iran
Harry Saputra	DF	20	0	2002	Singapore	2007	Singapore
Ferdinand Sinaga	FW	20	0	2011	Jordan	2019	Thailand
Kurnia Meiga	GK	20	0	2013	Saudi Arabia	2017	Puerto Rico
Ramadhan Sananta	FW	20	6	2022	Curaçao	2026	Bulgaria
Calvin Verdonk	DF	20	0	2024	Philippines	2026	Thailand
Ilham Jaya Kesuma	FW	19	13	2004	Singapore	2007	Singapore
Mustaqim	FW	19	9	1988	South Korea	1991	Singapore
Noah Maryem	MF	19	2	1983	Singapore	1989	Thailand
Achmad Jufriyanto	DF	19	2	2013	Netherlands	2019	Jordan
Hansamu Yama Pranata	DF	19	2	2016	Vietnam	2022	Brunei
Herrie Setyawan	DF	19	1	1989	Malaysia	1993	Singapore
Manahati Lestusen	DF	19	1	2014	Andorra	2019	United Arab Emirates
Zulkarnain Lubis	MF	19	0	1985	Thailand	1989	Japan
Ponirin Meka	GK	19	0	1983	Brunei	1988	South Korea
Muhammad Taufiq	MF	19	0	2012	Bahrain	2017	Cambodia
Nathan Tjoe-A-On	DF	19	0	2024	Vietnam	2026	Malaysia
Andi Ramang	FW	18	11	1952	Hong Kong	1962	India
Bakir Goordey	MF	18	5	1956	Yugoslavia	1960	Malaya
Ronny Wabia	FW	18	5	1996	Moldova	1997	Thailand
Mahyadi Panggabean	DF	18	1	2004	Turkmenistan	2011	Iran
Djet Donald La'ala	DF	18	0	2000	Taiwan	2004	Saudi Arabia
Putu Gede	MF	18	0	2000	Taiwan	2004	Sri Lanka
Jendri Pitoy	GK	18	0	2003	Malaysia	2008	Yemen
Erol Iba	DF	18	0	2006	Malaysia	2009	Australia
Jay Idzes	DF	18	1	2024	Vietnam	2026	Bulgaria
Shayne Pattynama	DF	18	2	2023	Argentina	2026	Thailand
Eri Irianto	MF	17	8	1993	Ghana	1997	Cambodia
Bambang Nurdiansyah (Note: National team manager in 2005.)	FW	17	5	1985	Thailand	1993	Singapore
Dendy Sulistyawan	FW	17	5	2022	Curaçao	2024	Libya
Imran Nahumarury	MF	17	3	1999	Hong Kong	2002	Thailand
Yaris Riyadi	MF	17	1	2000	Taiwan	2003	Saudi Arabia
Tony Sucipto	DF	17	1	2010	Uruguay	2015	Cameroon
Toyo Haryono	MF	17	0	1990	Singapore	1993	Singapore
Andritany Ardhiyasa	GK	17	0	2014	Andorra	2019	Thailand
Mohammad Nasuha	DF	16	2	2009	Singapore	2011	Bahrain
Rudy Keltjes	DF	16	1	1979	Singapore	1983	Brunei
Elly Idris	FW	16	0	1985	Thailand	1993	Thailand
Bonggo Pribadi	DF	16	0	1988	Malaysia	1993	Singapore
Suwandi Siswoyo	DF	16	0	1995	Cambodia	2000	Thailand
Novan Sasongko	DF	16	0	2012	Mauritania	2014	Andorra
Edo Febriansah	DF	16	0	2021	Myanmar	2024	Vietnam
Kevin Diks	DF	16	3	2024	Japan	2026	Thailand
Djamiat Dalhar	FW	15	6	1954	Japan	1957	Burma
Dimas Drajad	FW	15	6	2022	Bangladesh	2024	Philippines
Ristomoyo Kassim	DF	15	0	1982	Malaysia	1985	South Korea
Wahyu Wijiastanto	DF	15	0	2011	Saudi Arabia	2013	Iraq
Febri Hariyadi	FW	15	0	2017	Myanmar	2019	Malaysia
Dedik Setiawan	FW	15	0	2018	Mauritius	2022	Timor-Leste
Alfeandra Dewangga	DF	15	0	2021	Myanmar	2023	Turkmenistan
Ernando Ari	GK	15	0	2021	Laos	2024	Philippines
Peri Sandria	FW	14	5	1990	Singapore	1996	Malaysia
Pasek Wijaya	MF	14	4	1989	Singapore	1999	Hong Kong
Ortizan Solossa	DF	14	1	2004	Singapore	2005	Australia
Yeyen Tumena (Note: National team caretaker manager in 2019.)	DF	14	0	1996	Malaysia	1996	United Arab Emirates
Victor Igbonefo	DF	14	0	2013	Saudi Arabia	2021	Cambodia
Yanto Basna	DF	14	0	2016	Malaysia	2019	Malaysia
Maarten Paes	GK	14	0	2024	Saudi Arabia	2026	Malaysia
Joey Pelupessy	MF	14	0	2025	Bahrain	2026	Thailand
Ole Romeny	FW	14	7	2025	Australia	2026	Thailand
Ruben Sanadi	DF	13	0	2013	Netherlands	2019	Thailand
Abduh Lestaluhu	DF	13	0	2016	Vietnam	2019	Malaysia
Ricky Fajrin	DF	13	0	2017	Myanmar	2019	Malaysia
Eliano Reijnders	MF	13	0	2024	Bahrain	2026	Singapore
Syahrian Abimanyu	MF	12	1	2021	Afghanistan	2023	Burundi
Beto Gonçalves	FW	12	10	2018	Myanmar	2019	Vietnam
Ramai Rumakiek	FW	12	3	2021	Taiwan	2022	Timor-Leste
Singgih Pitono	FW	12	2	1990	Singapore	1993	Singapore
Vendry Mofu	MF	12	2	2012	North Korea	2013	China
Lerby Eliandry	FW	12	2	2016	Malaysia	2019	Vietnam
Alexander Saununu	MF	12	1	1989	Singapore	1993	Singapore
Yusuf Ekodono	FW	12	1	1991	Malaysia	1998	Thailand
Nova Arianto	DF	12	1	2008	Maldives	2010	Yemen
Septian David Maulana	MF	12	1	2016	Vietnam	2019	Malaysia
Syahrian Abimanyu	MF	12	1	2021	Afghanistan	2023	Burundi
Hermansyah	GK	12	0	1984	Thailand	1985	South Korea
Supriyono Salimin	DF	12	0	2002	Singapore	2002	Singapore
Dony Tri Pamungkas	DF	12	0	2024	Myanmar	2026	Singapore
Hanafing	MF	11	3	1989	Hong Kong	1991	Philippines
Eduard Ivakdalam	MF	11	3	1997	Philippines	2004	Sri Lanka
Saktiawan Sinaga	FW	11	3	2004	Turkmenistan	2008	Vietnam
Ribut Waidi	MF	11	2	1987	Singapore	1988	South Korea
Atep Rizal	FW	11	2	2006	Myanmar	2007	Syria
Hokky Caraka	FW	11	2	2023	Brunei	2024	Philippines
Seto Nurdiantoro	MF	11	1	2000	Kuwait	2001	China
Talaohu Musafri	FW	11	1	2008	Bangladesh	2014	Cuba
Adam Alis	MF	11	1	2017	Cambodia	2024	Vietnam
Didik Darmadi	DF	11	0	1981	Thailand	1985	South Korea
Listianto Raharjo	GK	11	0	1993	Ghana	1997	Singapore
Herman Pulalo	MF	11	0	1997	Zimbabwe	1998	Thailand
Komang Putra	GK	11	0	1999	Cambodia	2003	Saudi Arabia
Made Wirawan	GK	11	0	2011	Saudi Arabia	2015	Myanmar
Handi Ramdhan	CB	11	0	2012	Mauritania	2013	Iraq
Riko Simanjuntak	FW	11	0	2018	Mauritius	2023	Burundi
Kushedya Hari Yudo	FW	11	0	2021	Afghanistan	2021	Malaysia
Kadek Agung	MF	11	1	2021	Oman	2026	Cambodia
Beckham Putra	MF	11	2	2025	China	2026	Singapore
Djamiat Dalhar	FB	10	4	1953	South Korea	1956	PR Croatia
Haryanto Prasetyo	MF	10	3	1999	Lithuania	1999	Cambodia
Yonas Sawor	FW	10	1	1985	Thailand	1988	Thailand
Inyong Lolombulan	FW	10	1	1986	Paraguay	1991	Malta
Jessie Mustamu	MF	10	1	1988	South Yemen	1989	North Korea
Zulfiandi	MF	10	1	2018	Mauritius	2019	United Arab Emirates
Ajat Sudrajat	FW	10	1	1983	Singapore	1989	Malaysia
Budi Wahyono	MF	10	0	1984	Papua New Guinea	1988	Thailand
Sutrisno	DF	10	0	1984	Thailand	1988	Thailand
Budiawan Hendratno	DF	10	0	1984	Thailand	1989	Malaysia
Donny Latuperissa	GK	10	0	1985	South Korea	1993	Singapore
Putu Yasa	GK	10	0	1986	Kuwait	1989	Singapore
Budiman Yunus	DF	10	0	1996	Laos	2000	Thailand
Ali Sunan	MF	10	0	1999	Lithuania	1999	Cambodia
Agus Indra Kurniawan	MF	10	0	2004	Malaysia	2007	Singapore
Imanuel Wanggai	MF	10	0	2007	Syria	2014	Vietnam
Putu Gede	DF	10	0	2017	Myanmar	2019	Vietnam

== See also ==
- List of Indonesia international footballers born outside Indonesia
- List of Indonesia women's international footballers
