= List of football clubs in Indonesia by major honours won =

This is a list of the major honours won by football clubs in Indonesia. It lists every Indonesia club who has won any of the domestic trophies recognized as major titles by FIFA.

== Honours table ==
Indonesia Football Champions
Indonesia football champions began in 1931 as Perserikatan (amateur; lit. 'Inter-association football championship'). When the Perserikatan was still running, Galatama (semi professional; lit. 'The Premier League') was formed as part of a semi-professional competition in 1979, which made the highest caste competition in Indonesia run into two competitions. Both then merged into Liga Indonesia in 1994. During 1994–2007, Liga Indonesia Premier Division was the top ranked competition, which was relegated into second rank after the Indonesia Super League was established in 2008. During the dualism era (2011–2013), Indonesian Premier League (IPL) (Indonesian: Liga Prima Indonesia) was the highest level competition for football clubs in Indonesia, which later shared with Indonesia Super League (ISL) due to PSSI Extraordinary Congress on 17 March 2013. The top-level competition changed from ISL to Liga 1 in 2017. Later took on the current name Super League in 2025. (Note: RSSSF:) (Note: Arsip Sepakbola Indonesia:)
Piala Indonesia
Annual cup for Indonesian football clubs began in 2005 as Copa Indonesia. Later took on the current name "Piala Indonesia" in 2010. During 2011, 2013–2017 and 2020 onward it was not held for various reasons.
I-League Cup
Annual league cup for Indonesian football clubs began in 1985 as Piala Liga (lit. 'League Cup'), which was held under Galatama competition until 1989, then it was played again as Piala Galatama (lit. 'Galatama Cup') during 1992 and 1994. Later took on the current name in 2026.
Community Shield
Began in 1990 as Piala Utama (lit. 'The Main Cup') during 1990 and 1992 which was held by PSSI as a competition that brought four best clubs from Galatama and Perserikatan. Then it was succeeded by The PSSI Community Shield, a single match that was first contested in 2009 by the winners of the Liga Indonesia and the Piala Indonesia in the previous season, and it was played for only 3 occasions so far.

	Club	Super League	Piala Indonesia	I-League Cup	Community Shield	Total	Last trophy
1	Persija Jakarta	**11**	—	—	—	11	2018 Liga 1
2	Persib Bandung	10	—	—	—	10	2025–26 Super League
3	PSM Makassar	7	1	—	—	8	2022–23 Liga 1
4	Persebaya Surabaya	6	—	—	**1**	7	2004 Liga Indonesia Premier Division
5	PSMS Medan	6 (Note: Per some sources for the 1969–71 season but it is not listed in the PSSI 50th anniversary book.)	—	—	—	6	1985 Perserikatan
6	Persis Solo	5	—	—	—	5	1941 Perserikatan
6	Persipura Jayapura	4	—	—	**1**	5	2013 Indonesia Super League
6	Krama Yudha Tiga Berlian	2	—	**3**	—	5	1989 Piala Liga
6	Sriwijaya	1 (Note: Two titles if some sources claim the 2011–12 Indonesia Super League is recognized as an official title.)	**3**	—	**1**	5	2010 Indonesian Community Shield
10	Pelita Jaya (Note: Were changing their name so many times since they were formed as Pelita Jaya Jakarta, until they received current name Madura United in 2016.)	3	—	—	**1**	4	1993–94 Galatama
10	Arema	2	2	—	—	4	2009–10 Indonesia Super League
12	Niac Mitra (Note: NIAC Mitra Surabaya was dissolved by its owner, Alexander Wenas, on 24 September 1990. A phoenix club named Mitra Surabaya was founded in 1993. After relegation to the First Division, the club moved to Palangkaraya, Central Kalimantan and were renamed Mitra Kalteng Putra (MKP) in 1999. At the end of 2001 season, the club was loaned to Suryanto Anwar, after which they moved again, to Tenggarong, Kutai Kartanegara, East Kalimantan, where they received current name Mitra Kukar.)	3	—	—	—	3	1987–88 Galatama
12	Semen Padang	1 (Note: No title if the FIFA official website claims Sriwijaya was the official champion in the 2011–12 season.)	—	1	**1**	3	2013 Indonesian Community Shield
14	Bali United	2	—	—	—	2	2021–22 Liga 1
14	Persik Kediri	2	—	—	—	2	2006 Liga Indonesia Premier Division
14	PSIM Yogyakarta	2 (Note: Per Arsip Sepak Bola Indonesia for the 1941–43 season.)	—	—	—	2	1943 Perserikatan
14	PSIS Semarang	2	—	—	—	2	1998–99 Liga Indonesia Premier Division
14	Yanita Utama	2	—	—	—	2	1984 Galatama
14	Arseto	1	—	1	—	2	1990–92 Galatama
20	Bhayangkara	1	—	—	—	1	2017 Liga 1
20	Bandung Raya	1	—	—	—	1	1995–96 Liga Indonesia Premier Division
20	Persiraja Banda Aceh	1	—	—	—	1	1980 Perserikatan
20	Petrokimia Putra (Note: Petrokimia Putra Gresik merged with Persegres Gresik in 2005, received current name Gresik United Football Club)	1	—	—	—	1	2002 Liga Indonesia Premier Division
20	Warna Agung	1	—	—	—	1	1979–80 Galatama
20	Persibo Bojonegoro	—	1	—	—	1	2012 Piala Indonesia
20	Gelora Dewata (Note: Gelora Dewata '89 moved to Sidoarjo in 2001 and changed their name to Deltras.)	—	—	1	—	1	1994 Piala Galatama
20	Makassar Utama	—	—	1	—	1	1986 Piala Liga

Numbers in bold are Indonesian record totals for that competition.

== See also ==
- List of Indonesian football champions
- Indonesian football league system
- Super League
- Piala Indonesia
- I-League Cup
- PSSI Community Shield
