= Indonesian football league system =

Series of league system for association football clubs in Indonesia

- Country: Indonesia
- Sport: Association football
- Promotion and relegation: Yes

National system
- Federation: PSSI
- Confederation: AFC
- Top division: Super League
- Second division: Championship
- Cup competition: Piala Indonesia; I-League Cup

The Indonesian football league system is a series of league system for association football clubs in Indonesia. Since 1994, Liga Indonesia is the league competition featuring association football clubs, as a result of the merger of two existing top-flight football leagues: Perserikatan (amateur) and Galatama (semi professional). Liga Indonesia is managed by PSSI, the Indonesian national football federation, and operated by I-League and its previous iterations (Badan Liga Indonesia (BLI) from 1994 to 2008, PT Liga Indonesia (PT. LI) from 2008 to 2015, Badan Liga Amatir Indonesia (BLAI) from 2009 to 2014 (Lower-Tier Competition Operator), PT Liga Prima Indonesia Sportindo (PT. LPIS) from 2011 to 2013 (Dualism Competition Operator), PT Gelora Trisula Semesta (PT. GTS) from 2016 (Unofficial Competition Operator) and PT Liga Indonesia Baru (PT. LIB) from 2017 to 2025).

There are four levels of competition in the hierarchy recently. The top two tiers are professional competitions, the third tier is semi-professional, and the fourth tier is amateur.

== Structure ==
Super League is the first-tier of football league in Indonesia, formerly known as Liga 1 from 2017 until 2025. The second-tier is Championship, formerly Premier Division until 2014 and Liga 2 until 2025. The third-tier is Liga Nusantara, formerly Liga 3 from 2017 until 2024. Super League and Championship are professional leagues, while Liga Nusantara operates at a semi-professional level. All three leagues are operated by I-League, which also organizes the youth competition, Elite Pro Academy.

Liga 4 is the only amateur football league in Indonesia, consisting of an unlimited number of amateur clubs. Each of Indonesia's 38 provinces organizes its own provincial league, with the number of teams varying across regions. The top 64 teams from the provincial phase qualify for the national phase.

=== Men's ===
Level	League (s)	Division (s)
	Professional leagues	
1	Super League; 18 clubs ↓ 3 relegation spots	—
2	Championship; 20 clubs divided into 2 groups ↑ 3 promotion spots ↓ 3 relegation spots	Group A 10 clubs
2	Championship; 20 clubs divided into 2 groups ↑ 3 promotion spots ↓ 3 relegation spots	Group B 10 clubs
	Semi-professional league	
3	Liga Nusantara; 24 clubs divided into 3 groups ↑ 3 promotion spots ↓ TBD relegation spots (Note: For the 2026–27 season, I-League said that Liga Nusantara would have no relegation, but the regulation has not yet been published.)	Group A 8 clubs
3	Liga Nusantara; 24 clubs divided into 3 groups ↑ 3 promotion spots ↓ TBD relegation spots	Group B 8 clubs
3	Liga Nusantara; 24 clubs divided into 3 groups ↑ 3 promotion spots ↓ TBD relegation spots	Group C 8 clubs
	Non-professional league (amateur)	
4	Liga 4; 64 clubs in national phase Unlimited clubs in 38 provincial leagues Unlimited clubs in 514 regency/city leagues ↑ TBD promotion spots	38 provincial leagues
4	Liga 4; 64 clubs in national phase Unlimited clubs in 38 provincial leagues Unlimited clubs in 514 regency/city leagues ↑ TBD promotion spots	514 regency/city leagues

=== Youth ===
Level	Youth	Grassroots
1	Elite Pro Academy U20 (Super League, Championship)	Soeratin Cup U17
2	Elite Pro Academy U18 (Super League)	Soeratin Cup U15
3	Elite Pro Academy U16 (Super League)	Soeratin Cup U13

=== Women's ===
Level	League (s)	Division (s)
1	Indonesia Women's League; 6 clubs	—

== History ==
=== Pre-Independence ===
Since 1914, Indonesia (then still called the Dutch East Indies) had an amateur national football league called Stedenwedstrijden (Dutch East Indies city championship). This competition ran in an organized and continuous manner until 1950, organized by the Nederlandsch-Indische Voetbalbond (NIVB) from 1919 to 1935, then continued by the Nederlandsch-Indische Voetbal Unie (NIVU) from 1936 to 1948, and finally by the Ikatan Sepak Raga Negara Indonesia Serikat (ISNIS) in 1949–1950. Initially exclusive to the Dutch and other European players, by the late 1920s the competition became more inclusive, allowing participation from Bumiputera (indigenous) and Chinese players, though still limited to the elite. All members of the Dutch East Indies national football team who played in the 1938 FIFA World Cup came from this league.

At the same time, in 1930 PSSI was established as a form of resistance against NIVB's dominance and organized a parallel competition from 1931 to 1943 specifically for Bumiputera players. This competition later became the precursor of Perserikatan after independence.

Meanwhile, the Chinese community also held their own competition from 1917 to 1950, organized by the Comité Kampioenswedstrijden Tiong Hoa (CKTH) since 1927, and then by the Hwa Nan Voetbalbond (HNVB) from 1930 to 1950.

Level	League/Division	
1	Perserikatan (organized by PSSI)	Dutch East Indies Championship (organized by NIVB) (1914–1950)

=== Post-independence ===
==== Perserikatan and Galatama ====
The first national competition organized by PSSI after independence was Perserikatan in 1951, an amateur league that brought together teams based on regions or cities in Indonesia. Historically, Perserikatan was the successor competition that replaced the Stedenwedstrijden, which had previously been organized by ISNIS (Ikatan Sepak Raga Negara Indonesia Serikat). Perserikatan served as the main platform of Indonesian football until the late 1970s.

In 1979–80, a semi-professional league was founded, namely Galatama (Premier League), which consisted of only one level of competition (except 1983 and 1990 in which it involved 2 divisions). Therefore, since 1979, both Galatama and Perserikatan were existed and had their own league systems.

Level	League/Division	
1	Perserikatan	Galatama
2	Perserikatan First Division (since 1978)	Galatama First Division (1980, 1983, and 1990 only)
3	Perserikatan Second Division (since 1987)	

==== 1994–2008: Liga Indonesia ====
In 1994, PSSI merged both competitions into a new competition system, namely the Liga Indonesia. All clubs from both top-level leagues were merged into the Liga Indonesia Premier Division, the new system's top-flight league. Furthermore, since Galatama did not have lower-level leagues, Liga Indonesia's lower leagues took all clubs from the same level in Perserikatan. PSSI formed Badan Liga Indonesia to operate the new Liga Indonesia.

Level	League/Division
1	Liga Indonesia Premier Division
2	Liga Indonesia First Division
3	Liga Indonesia Second Division
4	Liga Indonesia Third Division (since 2005)

==== 2008–2011: ISL ====
In 2008, PSSI created a new level, the Indonesia Super League (ISL), as the system's new top-flight league. Hence, the Premier Division was then relegated to the second and so on. This new league was created to introduce full professionalism in Indonesian football. PSSI also formed PT Liga Indonesia to operate and organize the new league structure as a continuation of Badan Liga Indonesia.

In parallel with this league, U-21 teams from each participating ISL clubs compete in the ISL U-21.

Level	League/Division
1	Indonesia Super League
2	Liga Indonesia Premier Division
3	Liga Indonesia First Division
4	Liga Indonesia Second Division
5	Liga Indonesia Third Division

==== 2011–2014: Dualism ====
In 2011, PSSI replaced the ISL with the Indonesian Premier League (IPL) under a new league operator, PT Liga Prima Indonesia Sportindo (LPIS).

Level	League/Division
1	Indonesian Premier League
2	Liga Indonesia Premier Division
3	Liga Indonesia First Division
4	Liga Indonesia Second Division
5	Liga Indonesia Third Division

After the extraordinary congress on 17 March 2013, Premier League and Super League are in PSSI supervision prior to incorporation in 2014 under the name of Indonesia Super League. Before that the two leagues were still running, respectively.

Level	League/Division	
1	Indonesia Super League	Indonesian Premier League
2	Liga Indonesia Premier Division (LI)	Liga Indonesia Premier Division (LPIS)
3	Liga Indonesia First Division	
4	Liga Indonesia Second Division	
5	Liga Indonesia Third Division	

==== 2014–2015: Dualism ended and FIFA sanction ====
In 2014, PSSI divided into four level leagues competition include Super League, Premier Division, First Division and Amateur League/Province League called Liga Nusantara.

Level	League/Division
1	Indonesia Super League
2	Liga Indonesia Premier Division
3	Liga Indonesia First Division
4	Liga Nusantara

Started in 2015 league planned just divided into three level leagues competition include Super League, Premier Division and Liga Nusantara, after first division merged with Liga Nusantara.

Level	League/Division
1	Indonesia Super League
2	Liga Indonesia Premier Division
3	Liga Nusantara

However, the league season in 2015 was paused at first due to threats of sanctions from Badan Olahraga Profesional Indonesia (BOPI) and the Ministry of Youth and Sports on PSSI and PT LI because two ISL clubs, Arema and Persebaya, didn't get BOPI recommendations. This got FIFA's attention who threatened to ban Indonesian football altogether due to external meddling from BOPI and the Ministry in PSSI affairs. After the Ministry outright froze PSSI out from organizing football competitions in Indonesia, FIFA sanctioned PSSI on 30 May 2015 hence the competition was then discontinued. PT Liga Indonesia was then closed by PSSI in 2016.

==== 2017–present: Post-FIFA sanction ====
On 20 January 2017, PSSI replaced the three previous leagues (Super League, Premier Division and Liga Nusantara) with three new leagues, namely the Liga 1, Liga 2 and Liga 3. PSSI formed PT. Liga Indonesia Baru as the new league operator for Liga 1 and Liga 2 while Liga 3 is under PSSI and its local branches.

Level	League/Division
1	Liga 1
2	Liga 2
3	Liga 3

In 2024, PSSI plans to create a new level, namely the Liga 4 as the fourth division level that will be operated by PSSI and its local branches. In addition, PSSI announced that Liga 3 will be renamed to Liga Nusantara and will be operated by PT. Liga Indonesia Baru, which also operates Liga 1 and Liga 2.

Level	League/Division
1	Liga 1
2	Liga 2
3	Liga Nusantara
4	Liga 4

In 2025, PT. Liga Indonesia Baru rebranded Liga 1 and Liga 2 as the Super League and the Championship, respectively. Additionally, PT. LIB rebranded itself as the I-League.

Level	League/Division
1	Super League
2	Championship
3	Liga Nusantara
4	Liga 4

== Competition format ==
From the 1994–1995 to 2004–2005 season, Liga Indonesia's structure changed almost every year. For some seasons, there were two divisions within the top flight; for others, there were three. The number of clubs in the top flight wavered from 18 to 28, and seasons would last from 34 to 38 games. The top four clubs in each division qualified for a group stage "Final Eight Championship Playoff." The winners of the groups faced off for the championship.

During the 2004–2005 season, 18 clubs comprised the Indonesian top flight. A season lasted 34 games, in which each club played against each other on a home-and-away basis. The three teams at the bottom of the table are relegated into Division Satu, the second level of the Indonesian league system, while the three teams of Division Satu that won promotion replace them. The top two finishers in the league qualify for the AFC Champions League.

Starting with the 2003–2004 season, the championship was decided a double round-robin league system involving the top clubs of each division. Beginning with the 2005–2006 season, 28 clubs will comprise Liga Indonesia. Clubs compete in two divisions of 14 clubs each. Each club plays against each other on a home-and-away basis.

The league's popularity has grown so much that the 2006–2007 season will see another big expansion of the league from 28 to 36 clubs with both divisions comprising 18 clubs each.

In 2008, 18 top ranked clubs in the previous Premier Division were 'promoted' to a new highest level of competition, the Indonesia Super League, and the rest stayed in the same division. The PSSI examined those 18 clubs for their readiness to join the ISL, considering many aspects, like the stadium, financial condition and other requirements for full professional football clubs.

== Promotion and relegation ==
1. Super League (level 1, 18 teams): the bottom three teams are relegated to Championship
2. Championship (level 2, 20 teams): the champions, runner-up and third-place teams are promoted to Super League. The three worst teams will be relegated to Liga Nusantara.
3. Liga Nusantara (level 3, 24 teams): the champions, runner-up and third-place teams are promoted to Championship.
4. Liga 4 (level 4, unlimited number of teams)

== Cup competitions ==
Annual cup tournaments

- Copa Indonesia (2005–2009)
- Piala Indonesia (2010–present)

Annual league cup tournaments

- Piala Liga for Galatama clubs (1985–1989)
- Piala Galatama for Galatama clubs (1992–1993)
- I-League Cup (2026–present)

Annual super cup tournaments

- Galatama-Perserikatan National Invitation (1985)
- Piala Utama (1990 & 1992)
- Copa Super Cup (2006–2008)
- Indonesian Community Shield (2009–2013)

Break season tournaments

- Soeharto President's Cup for Perserikatan clubs (1972–1976)
- Inter Island Cup (2010–2014)
- Menpora Cup (2013 & 2021)
- Piala Presiden (2015–present)

== All tier champions by season ==
=== 1930–1943 ===
Season	Inlandsche Stedenwedstrĳden
1930 (unofficial) (Note: The 1930 season was an unofficial tournament.)	VIJ Batavia
1931	VIJ Batavia
1932	PSIM Yogyakarta
1932–33	VIJ Batavia
1933–34 (Note: The PSSI 50th anniversary book erroneously lists the venue of the tournament as Bandung and its runners-up as Persib (Bandoeng).)	VIJ Batavia
1934–35	Persis Solo
1935–36	Persis Solo
1936–37	Persib Bandung
1937–38	VIJ Batavia
1938–39	Persis Solo
1939–40	Persis Solo
1940–41	Persis Solo
1941–43 (Note: Per Arsip Sepakbola Indonesia. RSSSF claims this season was split into the 1941–42 and 1942–43 seasons when Persis was the champion on both.)	PSIM Yogyakarta

=== 1950–1978 ===
Season	Perserikatan
1950 (unofficial) (Note: The 1950 season was an unofficial tournament called Turnamen Kongres PSSI (PSSI Congress Tournament). RSSSF claims this season was the last in the Dutch East Indies era.)	Persib Bandung
1951	Persebaya Surabaya
1952	Persebaya Surabaya
1953–54	Persija Jakarta
1955–57	PSM Makassar
1957–59	PSM Makassar
1959–61	Persib Bandung
1962–64	Persija Jakarta
1964–65	PSM Makassar
1965–66	PSM Makassar
1966–67	PSMS Medan
1967–69 (Note: Per some sources but it is not listed in the PSSI 50th anniversary book. RSSSF claims this season was not held.)	PSMS Medan
1969–71	PSMS Medan
1971–73	Persija Jakarta
1973–75	Persija Jakarta and PSMS Medan
1975–78	Persebaya Surabaya

=== 1978–1994 ===
Season	Perserikatan	Perserikatan First Division	Perserikatan Second Division
1978–79	Persija Jakarta	Persipura Jayapura	No competition
1980	Persiraja Banda Aceh	Not held	No competition
1981–82	Not held	PSIS Semarang	No competition
1983	PSMS Medan	Not held	No competition
1984	Not held	Perseman Manokwari	No competition
1985	PSMS Medan	Persiba Balikpapan	No competition
1986	Persib Bandung	Not held	No competition
1986–87	PSIS Semarang	PSDS Deli Serdang	Persijatim East Jakarta
1987–88	Persebaya Surabaya	Persita Tangerang	Persijasel South Jakarta
1988–89	Not held		
1989–90	Persib Bandung	Persema Malang	PSIR Rembang
1990–91	Not held		
1991–92	PSM Makassar	PS Bengkulu	Perseden Denpasar
1992–93	Not held		
1993–94	Persib Bandung	Persipura Jayapura	Persis Solo

Season	Galatama	Galatama First Division
1979–80	Warna Agung	Angkasa
1980–82	NIAC Mitra	No competition
1982–83	NIAC Mitra	Semen Padang
1983–84	Yanita Utama	No competition
1984	Yanita Utama	No competition
1985	Krama Yudha Tiga Berlian	No competition
1986–87	Krama Yudha Tiga Berlian	No competition
1987–88	NIAC Mitra	No competition
1988–89	Pelita Jaya	No competition
1990	Pelita Jaya	Assyabaab Surabaya
1990–92	Arseto	No competition
1992–93	Arema Malang	No competition
1993–94	Pelita Jaya	No competition

=== 1994–2004 ===
Season	Premier Division	First Division	Second Division
1994–95	Persib Bandung	Persikab Bandung	Persikabo Bogor
1995–96	Bandung Raya	PSP Padang	Persikota Tangerang
1996–97	Persebaya Surabaya	Persikota Tangerang	Persipal Palu
1997–98	Competition abandoned due to political conditions		
1998–99	PSIS Semarang	PSPS Riau	PS Palembang
1999–2000	PSM Makassar	Persita Tangerang	Persik Kediri
2001	Persija Jakarta	PSIS Semarang	Persela Lamongan
2002	Petrokimia Putra	Persik Kediri	Persid Jember
2003	Persik Kediri	Persebaya Surabaya	Persekabpas Pasuruan
2004	Persebaya Surabaya	Arema Malang	Persibo Bojonegoro

=== 2005–2008 ===
Season	Premier Division	First Division	Second Division	Third Division
2005	Persipura Jayapura	PSIM Yogyakarta	Persiku Kudus	PSIR Rembang
2006	Persik Kediri	Persebaya Surabaya	PSIR Rembang	Perseta Tulungagung
2007–08	Sriwijaya	Persibo Bojonegoro	Persires Rengat	Persem Mojokerto

=== 2008–2011 ===
Season	Indonesia Super League	Premier Division	First Division	Second Division	Third Division
2008–09	Persipura Jayapura	Persisam Putra Samarinda	PS Mojokerto Putra	PS Barito Putera	Persikotas Tasikmalaya
2009–10	Arema Indonesia	Persibo Bojonegoro	Persekam Metro	Persikasi Bekasi	Persewar Waropen
2010–11	Persipura Jayapura	Persiba Bantul	PSBS Biak Numfor	Persibangga Purbalingga	MBU Sidoarjo

=== 2011–2013 ===
Season	Indonesia Super League	Premier Division	First Division	Second Division	Third Division
2011–12	Sriwijaya	Barito Putera	Perseka Kaimana	Persinab Nabire	Jember United
2013	Persipura Jayapura	Persebaya DU (Bhayangkara)	PS Kwarta	Cilegon United	Perseba Bangkalan

Season	Indonesian Premier League	Premier Division	First Division	Second Division	Third Division
2011–12	Semen Padang	Persepar (Kalteng Putra)	Persekap Pasuruan	Nusaina	Persiga Trenggalek
2013	Not awarded	PSS Sleman	No competition		

=== 2014–2016 ===
Season	Indonesia Super League	Premier Division	First Division	Nusantara League
2014	Persib Bandung	Pusamania Borneo	Cilegon United	Persatu Tuban

Season	Indonesia Super League	Premier Division	Nusantara League
2015	Competition abandoned due to FIFA suspension		

Season	ISC A	ISC B	ISC Nusantara League
2016 (unofficial)	Persipura Jayapura	PSCS Cilacap	Perseden Denpasar

=== 2017–2024 ===
Season	Liga 1	Liga 2	Liga 3
2017	Bhayangkara	Persebaya Surabaya	Blitar United
2018	Persija Jakarta	PSS Sleman	Persik Kediri
2019	Bali United	Persik Kediri	Persijap Jepara
2020	Competition abandoned due to COVID-19 pandemic		
2021–22	Bali United	Persis Solo	Karo United
2022–23	PSM Makassar	Competition abandoned after Kanjuruhan Stadium disaster	
2023–24	Persib Bandung	PSBS Biak	Adhyaksa Farmel

=== 2024–2025 ===
Season	Liga 1	Liga 2	Liga Nusantara	Liga 4
2024–25	Persib Bandung	PSIM Yogyakarta	Sumut United	Tri Brata Rafflesia

=== 2025–present ===
Season	Super League	Championship	Liga Nusantara	Liga 4
2025–26	Persib Bandung	Garudayaksa	RANS Nusantara	Pasuruan United
2026–27				

== See also ==
- Football records in Indonesia
- List of football clubs in Indonesia by major honours won
- Indonesia Women's League
- Indonesia Pro Futsal League
