= Rully Nere =

Indonesian footballer & coach (born 1957)

Personal information
- Full name: Rully Rudolf Nere
- Date of birth: 13 May 1957 (age 69)
- Place of birth: Sorong, Southwest Papua, Indonesia
- Position: Central midfielder

Youth career
- 1974: Persipura Jayapura

Senior career*
Years	Team	Apps	(Gls)
1975–1978	Persipura Jayapura	17	(2)
1978–1979	Persija Jakarta	8	(0)
1979–1984	Warna Agung	74	(6)
1984	Yanita Utama	22	(2)
1985–1987	Krama Yudha Tiga Berlian	30	(2)
1987–1996	Pelita Jaya		

International career
1979–1989	Indonesia	38	(4)

Managerial career
- PSPS
- Persiba
- PS Palembang
- 2010–2013: Pro Titan FC
- 2013–2015: PSBS Biak
- 2014–2015: Indonesia U20
- 2015–2020: Indonesia women
Medal record
Men's football
Representing Indonesia
Southeast Asian Games
Bronze medal – third place	1989 Kuala Lumpur	Team
Gold medal – first place	1987 Jakarta	Team
Bronze medal – third place	1981 Manila	Team
Silver medal – second place	1979 Jakarta	Team
- * Club domestic league appearances and goals

Rully Rudolf Nere is an Indonesian football head coach who last coached the Indonesia women's national football team.

== Playing career ==
A player for Persipura Jayapura in the 1980s, Nere was also a part of Indonesia national football team in the same period, including the squad which won the gold medal of 1987 Southeast Asian Games football tournament on home soil, where he laid the assist for the only goal by Ribut Waidi in the final against Malaysia.

Nere was also held the post as Director of PSSI Youth Development from 2003 to 2007.

His son, Mitchell Nere, is a footballer playing for same club he managed, Pro Titan.

== Coaching career ==
He managed several clubs during his career as a head coach.

On 5 March 2015, Rully Nere appointed by the Football Association of Indonesia as the Indonesia women's national football team coach.

== Honours ==
Persija Jakarta

- Perserikatan (1): 1978–79

Warna Agung

- Galatama (1): 1979–80

Pelita Jaya

- Galatama (2): 1988–89, 1993–94

Indonesia

- SEA Games

Gold medal: 1987
Silver medal: 1979
Bronze medal: 1981, 1989
