= Djamiat Dalhar =

Indonesian footballer and coach

Personal information
- Full name: Muhammad Djamia'at Dhalhar
- Date of birth: 25 November 1927
- Place of birth: Yogyakarta, Dutch East Indies
- Date of death: 23 March 1979 (aged 51)
- Place of death: Jakarta, Indonesia

Youth career
- Hizbul Wathan Yogyakarta

Senior career*
| Years | Team | Apps | (Gls) |
| 1950–1952 | UMS 1905 | | |
| 1952–1957 | Persija Jakarta | 224 | (116) |
| 1957–1958 | Persib Bandung | | |
| 1959–1961 | PSMS Medan | | |
| 1961–1965 | Persik Kediri | | |

International career
| 1954–1957 | Indonesia | 15 | (6) |

Managerial career
- 1962: Indonesia U19
- 1971–1972: Indonesia
- 1972–1973: Indonesia U19
- * Club domestic league appearances and goals

Muhammad Djamia'at Dhalhar (25 November 1927 – 23 March 1979), better known as Djamiat Dalhar, was an Indonesian footballer and coach. He played for and coached the Indonesia national football team.

== Playing career ==
Djamiat played for various clubs in Indonesia, such as HW Yogyakarta, UMS 1905, Persija Jakarta, Persib Bandung, PSMS Medan and Persik Kediri. He also played for the Indonesia national team.

He was known for his speed, dribbling, passing and shooting skills. He was also a versatile player who could play in different positions.

He retired from playing football in 1965.

== Coaching career ==
Djamiat became a coach after his retirement from playing. He coached various clubs and teams in Indonesia, such as Persija Jakarta, Persib Bandung, PSMS Medan, Persik Kediri, Persiraja Banda Aceh, Persipura Jayapura, PSS Sleman, PSIS Semarang, Pelita Jaya, Indonesia U17 and Indonesia U19.

He also coached the Indonesia national team in 1974. He led the team to a historic 2–0 victory over Uruguay in a friendly match at the Gelora Bung Karno Stadium in Jakarta. The match was attended by more than 80,000 spectators and was considered one of the greatest achievements of Indonesian football.

He was also involved in scouting and developing young talents for Indonesian football. He was credited for discovering players such as Ricky Yacobi, Robby Darwis, Ronny Pattinasarany and Bambang Nurdiansyah.

He died on 23 March 1979 in Jakarta at the age of 51.

== Legacy ==
Djamiat is regarded as one of the best players and coaches in Indonesian football history. He was known for his passion, dedication and professionalism in the sport. He was also respected for his humble and friendly personality. His name is honoured as the trophy for the Indonesia U-17 national championship, which is dedicated to his role in finding and nurturing young talents for Indonesian football.

== Career statistics ==
=== International ===
Scores and results list Indonesia's goal tally first, score column indicates score after each Dalhar goal.

List of international goals scored by Djamiat Dalhar
| No. | Date | Venue | Opponent | Score | Result | Competition |
|---|---|---|---|---|---|---|
| 1 | 30 April 1953 | Hong Kong | South Korea | 1–1 | 1–3 | Friendly |
| 2 | 1 May 1954 | Rizal Memorial Stadium, Manila, Philippines | Japan | 2–1 | 5–3 | 1954 Asian Games |
| 3 | 1 May 1954 | Rizal Memorial Stadium, Manila, Philippines | Japan | 5–1 | 5–3 | 1954 Asian Games |
| 4 | 5 May 1954 | Rizal Memorial Stadium, Manila, Philippines | India | 2–0 | 4–0 | 1954 Asian Games |
| 5 | 5 May 1954 | Rizal Memorial Stadium, Manila, Philippines | India | 3–0 | 4–0 | 1954 Asian Games |
| 6 | 8 May 1954 | Rizal Memorial Stadium, Manila, Philippines | Burma | – | 4–5 | 1954 Asian Games |

*This is an incomplete list

== Honours ==
Persija Jakarta

- Perserikatan: 1954
