= Herry Kiswanto =

Indonesian footballer and manager

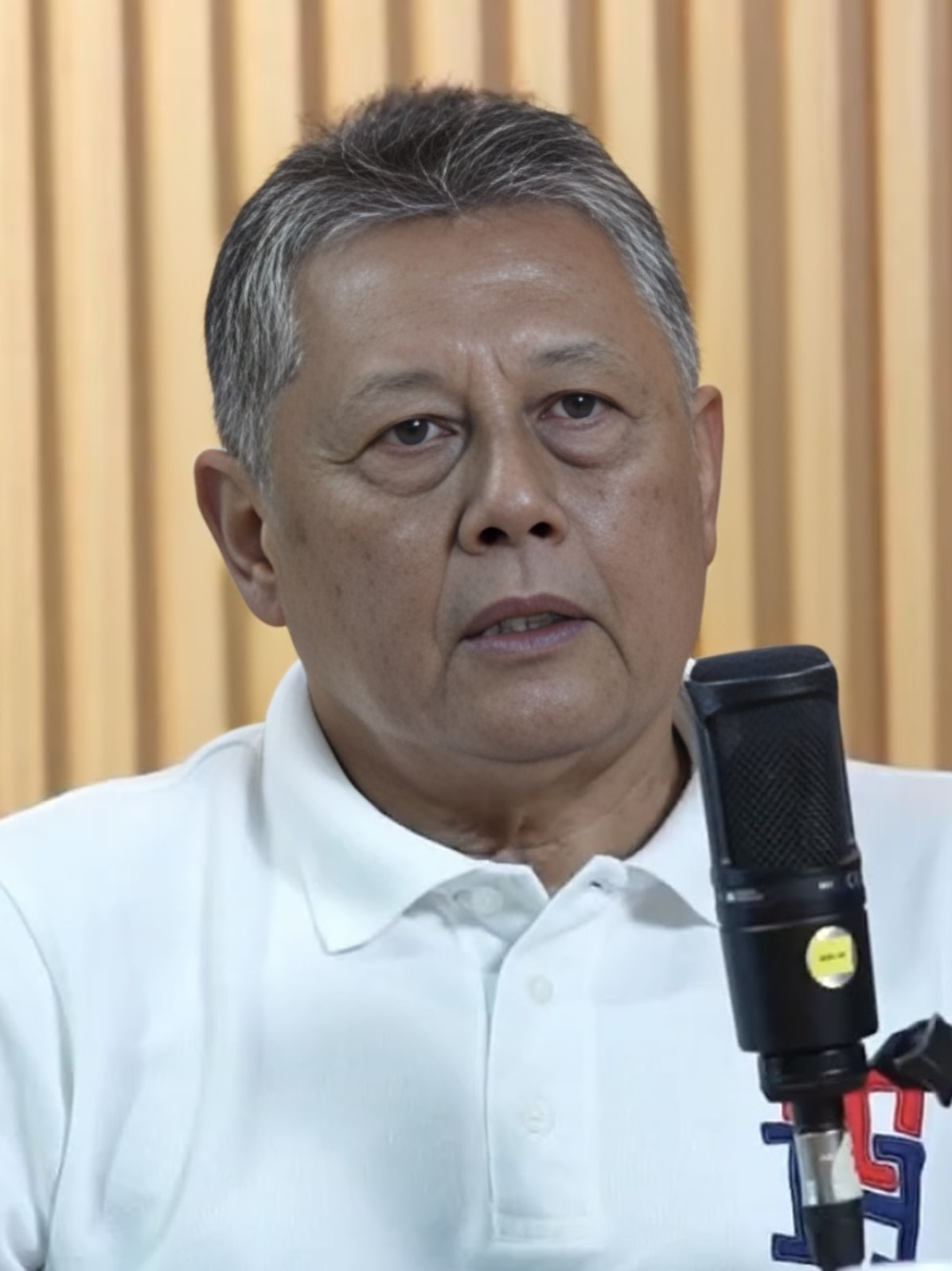
- Kiswanto in 2024

Personal information
- Date of birth: 25 April 1955 (age 71)
- Place of birth: Banda Aceh, Indonesia
- Position: Libero

Team information
- Current team: PSGC Ciamis (head coach)

Senior career*
Years	Team	Apps	(Gls)
1978–1979	Persib Bandung	8	(1)
1979–1983	Pardedetex Medan		
1983–1985	Yanita Utama		
1985–1991	Krama Yudha Tiga Berlian		
1991–1993	Assyabaab Salim Grup		
1993–1997	Bandung Raya		

International career
1981–1993	Indonesia	40	(3)

Managerial career
- 1997–2000: Indonesia (coach assistant)
- 2000–2001: PSBL Bandar Lampung
- 2002–2004: Persija Jakarta (assistant)
- 2004–2005: PSIS Semarang
- 2005–2006: PSS Sleman
- 2007–2008: Persmin Minahasa
- 2008–2009: Persiraja Banda Aceh
- 2009–2010: Persikab Bandung
- 2010–2013: Persiraja Banda Aceh
- 2014–2017: PSS Sleman
- 2018: Persika Karawang
- 2019: Sulut United
- 2020: Cilegon United
- 2024–: PSGC Ciamis
Medal record
Men's football
Representing Indonesia
Southeast Asian Games
Bronze medal – third place	1989 Kuala Lumpur	Team
Gold medal – first place	1987 Jakarta	Team
Bronze medal – third place	1981 Manila	Team
- * Club domestic league appearances and goals

Herry Kiswanto (born 25 April 1955) is an Indonesian football manager and former player, who played as a libero.

He is a former member of the Indonesia national team. On 3 April 2007 he received an Indonesian legendary player award. He is known for his sportsmanship, as he only received one yellow card during his 17 years senior career.

== Early life ==
Herry Kiswanto was born on 25 April 1955 in Banda Aceh, Aceh to a couple of Sundanese descendant, Qomari and Siti Salamah. Later, his parents took him back to their family homeland in Ciamis, West Java. He took elementary and high school education there, he also start to play football. He joined the club Tornado and PTPN XIII as a youth player. Afterward he moved to study in Bandung, where he played for the club UNI while attending college.

== Club career ==
Kiswanto start his senior career in 1979, when he join Pardedetex Medan after the club owner TD Pardede saw him play. He initially played as a midfielder, but following a suggestion from his coach, Kamaruddin Panggabean, he began playing as a libero, a position he played in for both club and country.

After 4 years, he moved to Yanita Utama, where he spent for 2 years before moving Krama Yudha Tiga Berlian in 1985. He had success with both Yanita Utama and Krama Yudha Tiga Berlian success, as a champion of Galatama (highest level football league in Indonesia at that era) in 1983–1987 era. He helped his club to be champion of Galatama for 4 consecutive years. He stayed with Krama Yudha Tiga Berlian until 1991.

Later he moved to Assyabaab Salim Grup, before signing with Bandung Raya in 1993. He retired as a player after leading Bandung Raya to be a champion in Liga Indonesia Premier Division, during the 1995–1996 season under the manager Henk Wullems.

He is famous in Indonesian football for receiving only one yellow card during his 17-year career. His only booking came in a match for Krama Yudha Tiga Berlian against home side Pelita Jaya at Lebak Bulus Stadium, Jakarta, after protesting (in his role as a captain) about a refereeing decision. Kiswanto later said about that moment, "I always try not to get yellow card, but I got one, and I regret for that, at that time I ask to the referee about his decision, but he give me a yellow card instead of explanation".

== International career ==
According to the RSSSF, his international debut was on 30 May 1981. He earn 40 caps and scored 3 goals.

He was a part of the Indonesia team that won a bronze medal at the 1981 Southeast Asian Games, and 1989 Southeast Asian Games. He was also a silver medalist at the 1983 Southeast Asian Games, and was a gold medalist at the 1987 Southeast Asian Games.

He helped Indonesia win Group B during 1986 FIFA World Cup qualification, where they lost to South Korea in the next round. Also in 1986, he is a squad of Indonesia as 1986 Asian Games semifinalist. His last international match was on 19 June 1993.

== Managerial career ==
Kiswanto started his career as a coach in 1997 when Henk Wullems asked him to be an assistant coach for the Indonesian national side. He stayed at that position until 2000. He was manager of PSBL Lampung in 2000–2001, and assistant manager of Persija Jakarta in 2002–2004. After that he was a manager of PSIS Semarang and Persikabo Bogor, both for only one year.

His success as a manager started at Persmin Minahasa, when he led the club to 8th place in Liga Indonesia Premier Division season 2007–2008, and successfully promoted to Indonesia Super League in the season 2008–2009. But the club did not play in Indonesia Super League as they failed to meet verification criteria by Football Association of Indonesia.

Subsequently, he was contracted by his hometown club Persiraja Banda Aceh as a manager for the Liga Indonesia Premier Division season 2008–2009. But, following funding issues, he decided to resign after the end of half season competition. From Banda Aceh, he move to Soreang and directly tied a contract for the club Persikab Bandung.

For the 2010/2011 season, he returned to Persiraja Banda Aceh, where he led the club to become champions of 2010–2011 Liga Indonesia Premier Division. Persiraja then promoted to Indonesia Super League, but following internal conflict in Football Association of Indonesia, which resulted in dual competition, the club choose to play in Indonesia Premier League. Towards the start of season 2011/2012 there was a rumour that Herry will move to Persib Bandung, but he explained that he will stay at Persiraja Banda Aceh.

In November 2014, he was punished by PT Liga for his involvement in the match fixing case between PSIS Semarang and the team he managed PSS Sleman. He got a lifetime ban from participating in national football activities in Indonesia and a Rp. 200 million fine.

== Personal life ==
Kiswanto is married to Tuty Heriyati and they have two children, Dony Prakasa Utama and Tania Natasya Berlian.

He maintained a reputation for a calm demeanor both on and off the pitch. Before his professional football career, he worked as a bank employee. He has stated that he did not receive the home promised by the government as a reward for his gold medal at the 1987 Southeast Asian Games. Additionally, he receives a monthly national team pension of Rp100,000 (approximately $11). In addition to managing football, he operates a land transfer and house rental business.

In April 2007, Kiswanto received an Indonesia legendary player award, from the Football Association of Indonesia (PSSI), along with 21 other players. This award was granted to the players who promote Indonesian football in the international arena.

== Career statistics ==
=== International ===
Appearances and goals by national team and year
National team	Year	Apps	Goals
Indonesia	1981	2	0
Indonesia	1983	3	0
Indonesia	1985	12	1
Indonesia	1987	6	1
Indonesia	1988	2	0
Indonesia	1989	10	2
Indonesia	1993	5	0
Total		40	4

Scores and results list Indonesia's goal tally first, score column indicates score after each Kiswanto goal.

List of international goals scored by Herry Kiswanto
No.	Date	Venue	Cap	Opponent	Score	Result	Competition
1	29 March 1985	Thai-Japanese Stadium, Bangkok, Thailand	9	Thailand	1–0	1–0	1986 FIFA World Cup qualification
2	17 September 1987	Gelora Senayan Stadium, Jakarta, Indonesia	23	Burma	4–1	4–1	1987 SEA Games
3	25 June 1989	Gelora Senayan Stadium, Jakarta, Indonesia	32	Hong Kong	2–2	3–2	1990 FIFA World Cup qualification
4	25 June 1989	Gelora Senayan Stadium, Jakarta, Indonesia	32	Hong Kong	3–2	3–2	1990 FIFA World Cup qualification

== Honours ==
Yanita Utama

- Galatama: 1983–1984, 1984

Krama Yudha Tiga Berlian

- Galatama: 1985, 1986–1987

Bandung Raya

- Liga Indonesia Premier Division: 1995–96; runner up: 1996–97

Indonesia

- SEA Games gold medal: 1987; bronze medal: 1981, 1989

Individual

- IFFHS Men’s All Time Indonesia Dream Team: 2022

Preceded by Ronny Pattinasarany	Indonesian Captain; 1985–1987	Succeeded by Ricky Yacobi
