= Ronny Pattinasarany =

Indonesian footballer

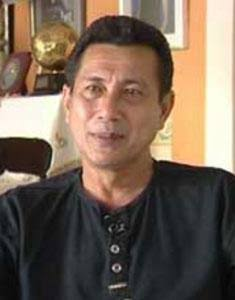
- Pattinasarany in 2008

Personal information
- Full name: Ronald Hermanus Pattinasarany
- Date of birth: 9 February 1949
- Place of birth: Makassar, Indonesia
- Date of death: 19 September 2008 (aged 59)
- Place of death: Jakarta, Indonesia
- Position: Centre-back

Youth career
- 1966–1968: PSM Makassar

Senior career*
Years	Team	Apps	(Gls)
1968–1978	PSM Makassar	80	(18)
1978–1982	Warna Agung	48	(6)
1983	Tunas Inti	18	(1)

International career
1970–1981	Indonesia	31	(6)
Medal record
Men's football
Representing Indonesia
Southeast Asian Games
Bronze medal – third place	1981 Manila	Team
Silver medal – second place	1979 Jakarta	Team
- * Club domestic league appearances and goals

Ronald Hermanus Pattinasarany (9 February 1949 – 19 September 2008) was an Indonesian professional football player and manager. He is one of Indonesia's legendary players and had captained the Indonesia national football team from 1980 to 1985.

== Club career ==
Pattinasarany started his career as a football player when he joined PSM Junior in 1966. Two years later he managed to break through to the senior level in PSM Makassar. From PSM, he left for the Galatama club, Warna Agung from 1978 to 1982. This was where his career started to climb so he was elected to enter and become the national team captain. In 1982, he left for Tunas Inti. After only a year there, he decided to hang up his boots and switch position as a coach.

== International career ==
In the 1970s to 1980s, when Indonesian football was one of the giants in Asia, Pattinasary was one of those who helped make the name of the Red and Whites team famous. He is known as a top player. He received awards such as Asian All Star Player in 1982, Best National Athlete in 1976 and 1981, Best Galatama Player in 1979 and 1980, and won the SEA Games Silver Medal in 1979 and 1981.

== Managerial career ==
There are several Indonesian clubs that he has coached, including Persiba Balikpapan, Krama Yudha Tiga Berlian, Persita Tangerang, Petrokimia Putra, Makassar Utama, Persitara Jakarta Utara and Persija Jakarta. However, the best achievement ever made by Pattinasarany was when he managed Petrokimia Putra when he successfully won several trophies for the club. He led Petrokimia to win the Surya Cup, Petro Cup, and runner-up Tugu Muda Cup.

Towards the end of the 1990s, Pattynasarany, who at that time was predicted to be one of the best coaches in Indonesia, surprisingly said goodbye to the world of Indonesian football, and decided to stop being the coach of Petrokimia Putra Gresik which he was holding at that time, because Ronny wanted to focus on guiding his two children, Benny and Yerry, who at that time were struggling with their addiction to drugs.

== Personal life ==
Pattinasarany married Stella Maria on 29 November 1977. They have 3 children, Robenno "Benny" Pattrick, Henry "Yerry" Jacques, and Tresita "Cita" Diana. Then they adopted one child who was their nephew, Pieter Pattinasarany.

He also has two grandchildren, namely Clarrice Faithlyn Pattinasarany (daughter of Benny and Melisa Milanova) and Roland Dimitri Levinus Nangin (son of Cita and Reza Nangin).

In 2006, to coincide with his 29th wedding anniversary, he and his wife launched a historical book, one of which contains his struggle in guiding his two children, Benny and Yerry, to get out of the trap of drugs.

He was known as the father of futsal in Indonesia because of his dedication to spread the popularity of futsal in Indonesia. He played an important part in forming the Indonesia national futsal team in 2002 by recommending Sartono Anwar to become the team's first ever head coach among others.

== Death ==
Pattinasarany died on 19 September 2008 at Omni Medical Center Hospital, Pulo Mas, East Jakarta, due to liver cancer which he had suffered from since December 2007.

== Honours ==
=== Player ===
Indonesia

- Jakarta Anniversary Tournament: 1972
- SEA Games silver medal: 1979; bronze medal: 1981
- Merdeka Tournament runner-up: 1971
- President's Cup runner-up: 1980

Indonesia U-20

- AFC Youth Championship runner-up: 1970

PSM Makassar

- Soeharto Cup: 1974

Warna Agung

- Galatama: 1979–80

Individual

- Indonesian Athlete of the Year: 1976, 1981
- Galatama Player of the Year: 1979, 1980
- IFFHS Men’s All Time Indonesia Dream Team: 2022

=== Manager ===
- Surya Cup
- Petro Cup
- Tugu Muda Cup runner-up

Preceded by Iswadi Idris	Indonesian Captain; 1980–1985	Succeeded by Herry Kiswanto
