= Sartono Anwar =

Indonesian footballer and manager

Sartono
Personal information
- Full name: Sartono Anwar
- Date of birth: 3 September 1947 (age 79)
- Place of birth: Semarang, Indonesia
- Position: Midfielder

Team information
- Current team: Persisam Putra Samarinda (coach)

Youth career
- 1960–1962: SSS
- 1962–1966: Diklat Salatiga

Senior career*
Years	Team	Apps	(Gls)
1968–1970	PSIS Semarang		
- PS Atomsi Malang
- Persema Malang
- PS Angkasa Bandung
–1972	Persib Bandung		

Managerial career
- 1972–1975: PSIS Junior (GK coach)
- 1975–1976: PSIS Semarang
- 1976–1978: Diklat Salatiga
- PON Central Java
- PS UMS
- BPD Jateng
- 1982–1992: Indonesia (asst. coach)
- 1984–1992: Indonesia B
- 1987: PSIS Semarang
- Assyabaab Salim Group
- Petrokimia Putra
- Arseto Solo
- Putra Samarinda
- Persegi Gianyar
- Persibas Banyumas
- 2002: Indonesia futsal
- Persedikab Kediri
- Persikab Bandung
- PSIS Semarang
- 2011–2012: Persibo Bojonegoro
- 2012: Persijap Jepara
- 2012–2013: Persisam Putra Samarinda
- 2013–2014: PSS Sleman
- 2015–2016: Persak Kebumen
- 2017: Madiun Putra
- 2023: Persibas Banyumas
- * Club domestic league appearances and goals as of 9 November 2023

Sartono Anwar (born 3 September 1947 in Semarang) is a former Indonesian footballer who is a football coach. He managed Persibas Banyumas since November 2023. He is also known as the first ever head coach of the Indonesia national futsal team. Sartono is also the father of Nova Arianto, the current head coach of the Indonesia national under-20 football team.

== History ==
Although the world of football often brings frustration, "I can not escape from football. I was ready to be disappointed," said Sartono while fixing his hat. Anwar diving sartono his world patiently. For him, the days football was a fun day. Such that morning, after giving a training session, Sartono mingle with the players. He chatted with the players on the sidelines and locker rooms. It is a way of maintaining closeness with his team Sartono. Football career was the father of seven children beginning at age 13 years. When the young Sartono joined the club Sport Supaya Sehat (SSS), a local club in the city of Semarang. Sartono talent round leather processing decreased from M. Anwar, who is also the father of a football player in PS POP Semarang.

== Playing career ==
Football career was the father of seven children beginning at age 13 years. When the young Sartono joined the club Sport Supaya Sehat (SSS), a local club in the city of Semarang. Sartono talent round leather processing decreased from M. Anwar, who is also the father of a football player in PS POP Semarang.

"In addition to often see my dad play ball, as a child I often brought the ball PSIS just so I can go watch PSIS play," he recalls. For Sartono, a good football coach does not have a former national team player. He named Benny Dollo and Daniel Roekito are some examples of good coaches who do not have a background as a national team players like him. After joining the PS SSS, his talent as a midfielder being honed after joining in Training and Education Center Salatiga in 1962–1966. After that, for two years, Sartono straight into the PSIS Semarang squad. Sartono of the school's career skyrocketed to join the PSIS. He was right. His salary as coach training Salatiga then Rp 50 thousand per month. This number doubled his salary as an employee of Pertamina. For the Semarang football public, Sartono is legend. In addition to ever strengthen the team in the 1970s, coaches cap is identical to the first time successfully delivering Mahesha jenar, nicknames PSIS Semarang, a Perserikatan champions beat Persebaya in 1987. Semarang society miss celebrating a similar victory party. Celebrated their last victory in 1999.

Finally, in 1972, Sartono decided to retire.

== Coaching career ==
In the same year, he worked as an employee of Pertamina Distribution Pengapon Semarang. However, he felt his soul can not be separated from football. While working at Pertamina, he became goalkeeper coach PSIS-school boy soccer PSIS that time-until 1975. After that, 1975–1976, he coached PSIS. Sartono may fail as a player, but, as a coach, including a successful career.

At 1976–1978, Wiel Coerver, the national team coach, Sartono appointed as coach Diklat Salatiga. Being a coach in training camp is quite prestigious at that time. Training is to be churning out some of the current national players. Frequent pacing Semarang-Salatiga turned out to be its own record for Pertamina leader Sartono work place. Ultimatum came. Sartono must choose to be employees of Pertamina or coach. Sartono answer the ultimatum to get out of the spot Pertamina.

Since then, the father of ex-national team player and Persib Bandung's Nova Arianto, a career as a football coach until now. In addition to training Salatiga and PSIS, a club he ever was a team arsiteki PON Central Java, Jakarta PS UMS (Galatama), BPD Central Java (Galatama), Assyabaab Salim Group, Petrokimia Putra, Arseto Solo, Putra Samarinda, Persegi Gianyar, Persibas Banyumas, Persedikab Kediri, Persikab Bandung, PSIS Semarang, Persibo Bojonegoro, Persisam Putra Samarinda. For the national team, the father of seven children in 1982 was an assistant coach Sinyo Aliandoe, which handles the national team. At 1984–1992, Sartono became assistant coach Indonesia A and Benny Dolo became head coach Indonesia B with as an assistant coach.

In 2002 after Indonesia was given the rights to host the 2002 AFC Futsal Championship, Sartono was appointed as the first ever coach of the Indonesia national futsal team. Serving alongside Suhatman Iman, he was given the task to form the national team from scratch three months before the tournament began. According to Sartono, the squad was consisted of football players from Liga Indonesia. Some players were given the nod after they weren't able to be selected for the Indonesia national football team.

== Honours ==
PSIS Semarang

- Perserikatan champions (1): 1987
