= Herrie Setyawan =

Association football player

Personal information
- Date of birth: 8 March 1969 (age 57)
- Place of birth: Makassar, Indonesia
- Position: Defender

Senior career*
Years	Team	Apps	(Gls)
1987–1988	Bandung Raya		
1988–1995	Madura United		
1996–2002	Persib Bandung		
2003	Bontang FC		
2004	Persijap Jepara		
2005	PS Mojokerto Putra		
2006	PSB Bogor		
2006	Persma Manado		
2008	PSSA Asahan		

International career
1989–1993	Indonesia	19	(1)

Managerial career
- 2013–2017: Persib Bandung (Assistant coach)
- 2018: PSM Makassar (Head coach of youth team)
- 2019: PSGC Ciamis
- 2020–2021: PSM Makassar (Assistant coach)
- 2021: Hizbul Wathan
- 2022: Persid Jember
Medal record
Men's football
Representing Indonesia
Southeast Asian Games
Gold medal – first place	1991 Philippines	Team
Bronze medal – third place	1989 Malaysia	Team
- * Club domestic league appearances and goals

Herrie Setyawan (born 8 March 1969) is an Indonesian professional football coach and former player.

== Club career ==
Setyawan started his career with Indonesian side Bandung Raya.

== International career ==
Setwayan has played for the Indonesia national football team.

== Managerial career ==
After retiring form professional football, Setyawan worked as a manager.

== Career statistics ==
=== International ===
Appearances and goals by national team and year
National team	Year	Apps	Goals
Indonesia	1989	2	0
Indonesia	1991	5	0
Indonesia	1992	2	1
Indonesia	1993	10	0
Total		19	1

Scores and results list Indonesia's goal tally first, score column indicates score after each Setyawan goal.

List of international goals scored by Herrie Setyawan
No.	Date	Venue	Cap	Opponent	Score	Result	Competition
1	11 June 1993	National Stadium, Kallang, Singapore	16	Singapore	1–0	1–1	1993 SEA Games

== Honours ==
NIAC Mitra

- Galatama: 1980–82, 1982–83

Indonesia

- SEA Games gold medal: 1991; bronze medal: 1989
