= 1982–83 Galatama =

Galatama
- Season: 1982–83
- Dates: 28 August 1982 – 28 May 1983
- Champions: NIAC Mitra
- Matches played: 210
- Goals scored: 481 (2.29 per match)
- Top goalscorer: Dede Sulaiman (27 goals)

The 1982–83 Galatama was the third season of Galatama that was held from 28 August 1982 to 28 May 1983. It was the first season in which the league was split into two divisions. It was also the first season which saw foreign players compete in officially sanctioned Indonesian football competition.

== Teams ==
=== Premier Division ===
- NIAC Mitra
- Jayakarta
- Indonesia Muda
- Warna Agung
- Pardedetex
- Mercu Buana
- Perkesa '78
- Makassar Utama
- Arseto
- UMS '80
- Tunas Inti
- Jaka Utama
- Angkasa
- Sari Bumi Raya
- Bintang Timur

=== First Division ===
- Cahaya Kita
- Semen Padang
- Bima Kencana
- Caprina
- Tempo Utama
- Mataram Putra

=== Foreign players ===
There were four foreign players contracted to Galatama clubs this season.

Pemain	Negara	Klub
Jairo Matos	Brazil	Pardedetex
Ulrich Wilson	Germany	Pardedetex
Fandi Ahmad	Singapore	NIAC Mitra
David Lee	Singapore	NIAC Mitra

== League table ==
=== Premier Division ===
Pos	Team	Pld	W	D	L	GF	GA	GD	Pts	Qualification
1	NIAC Mitra (C)	28	18	6	4	57	18	+39	42	Champions
2	UMS '80	28	15	9	4	40	21	+19	39	
3	Pardedetex	28	16	7	5	38	20	+18	39	
4	Warna Agung	28	14	7	7	45	23	+22	35	
5	Indonesia Muda	28	15	4	9	42	29	+13	34	
6	Perkesa '78	28	11	11	6	27	22	+5	33	
7	Tunas Inti	28	12	8	8	37	30	+7	32	
8	Arseto	28	9	11	8	42	37	+5	29	
9	Makassar Utama	28	10	7	11	26	21	+5	27	
10	Mercu Buana	28	7	12	9	24	25	−1	26	
11	Jaka Utama	28	9	4	15	26	40	−14	22	
12	Sari Bumi Raya	28	7	7	14	25	41	−16	21	
13	Angkasa	28	4	8	16	18	46	−28	16	
14	Jayakarta	28	0	13	15	11	43	−32	13	
15	Bintang Timur	28	3	6	19	23	65	−42	12	

Source: RSSSF
(C) Champions

=== First Division ===
Pos	Team	Pld	W	D	L	GF	GA	GD	Pts	Promotion
1	Semen Padang (Note: Originally, two teams were to be promoted to the Premier Division, but eventually all of the teams, apart from Mataram Putra, were promoted for the following season.) (P)	10	7	2	1	27	5	+22	16	Promoted
2	Tempo Utama (P)	10	7	2	1	18	8	+10	16	Promoted
3	Caprina (P)	10	3	6	1	15	7	+8	12	Promoted
4	Bima Kencana (P)	10	3	3	4	11	16	−5	9	Promoted
5	Cahaya Kita (P)	10	2	2	6	8	22	−14	6	Promoted
6	Mataram Putra	10	0	1	9	6	27	−21	1	

Source: RSSSF
(P) Promoted
