= 1979–80 Galatama =

Indonesian football league season

Galatama
- Season: 1979–80
- Dates: 17 March 1979 – 6 May 1980
- Champions: Warna Agung
- Runner-up: Jayakarta
- Third place: Indonesia Muda
- Matches: 169
- Goals: 503 (2.98 per match)
- Top goalscorer: Hadi Ismanto (22 goals)
- Biggest home win: NIAC Mitra 12–0 Tidar Sakti (3 April 1980)
- Biggest away win: Cahaya Kita 1–8 Warna Agung (26 Disember 1979)
- Highest scoring: NIAC Mitra 12–0 Tidar Sakti (3 April 1980)

The 1979–80 Galatama was the inaugural season of the Indonesian Galatama football competition since its establishment in 1979. The season was played from 17 March 1979 to 6 May 1980 and Warna Agung won the championship.

== Teams ==
The first edition of Galatama was contested by 14 teams.

Bandung

- Sari Bumi Raya

Bogor

- Perkesa 78

Magelang

- Tidar Sakti

Medan

- Pardedetex

Surabaya

- NIAC Mitra

Tanjungkarang

- Jaka Utama

Jakarta

- Arseto - BBSA Tama - Buana Putra - Cahaya Kita - Indonesia Muda - Jayakarta - Tunas Inti - Warna Agung

== League table ==
| Pos | Team | Pld | W | D | L | GF | GA | GD | Pts | Qualification |
|---|---|---|---|---|---|---|---|---|---|---|
| 1 | Warna Agung (C) | 25 | 17 | 4 | 4 | 62 | 24 | +38 | 38 | Champions |
| 2 | Jayakarta | 25 | 14 | 9 | 2 | 36 | 8 | +28 | 37 | |
| 3 | Indonesia Muda | 25 | 15 | 6 | 4 | 62 | 28 | +34 | 36 | |
| 4 | NIAC Mitra | 25 | 13 | 8 | 4 | 62 | 19 | +43 | 34 | |
| 5 | Pardedetex | 25 | 10 | 8 | 7 | 37 | 21 | +16 | 28 | |
| 6 | Jaka Utama | 25 | 10 | 5 | 10 | 30 | 33 | −3 | 25 | |
| 7 | Perkesa '78 | 25 | 10 | 4 | 11 | 33 | 30 | +3 | 24 | |
| 8 | Arseto | 25 | 7 | 10 | 8 | 34 | 33 | +1 | 24 | |
| 9 | Tunas Inti | 25 | 7 | 7 | 11 | 34 | 39 | −5 | 21 | |
| 10 | Sari Bumi Raya | 25 | 7 | 7 | 11 | 26 | 42 | −16 | 21 | |
| 11 | Cahaya Kita | 25 | 8 | 5 | 12 | 28 | 58 | −30 | 21 | |
| 12 | Tidar Sakti | 25 | 4 | 5 | 16 | 30 | 74 | −44 | 13 | |
| 13 | Buana Putra | 25 | 3 | 6 | 16 | 19 | 52 | −33 | 12 | |
| 14 | BBSA Tama (Note: BBSA (denotes Bangka Billiton Sports Association) Tama withdrew after first half of season.) (W) | 13 | 2 | 0 | 11 | 10 | 42 | −32 | 4 | Withdrew |

Updated to match(es) played on 6 May 1980. Source:
Rules for classification: 1) points; 2) goal difference; 3) number of goals scored.
The points system worked as follows: 2 points for a win; 1 point for a draw.
(C) Champions; (W) Withdrew

== Results ==
| Home \ Away | WAR | JAY | IND | NIA | PAR | JAK | PER | ARS | TUN | SBR | CAH | TID | BUA | BBS |
|---|---|---|---|---|---|---|---|---|---|---|---|---|---|---|
| Warna Agung | | 0–2 | 1–3 | 3–3 | 2–1 | 3–0 | 2–0 | 5–0 | 0–0 | 1–2 | 6–0 | 3–0 | 2–0 | |
| Jayakarta | 0–1 | | 0–0 | 1–1 | 0–0 | 2–0 | 1–0 | 1–0 | 4–0 | 2–0 | 0–0 | 2–1 | 2–0 | |
| Indonesia Muda | 1–2 | 1–1 | | 1–1 | 1–3 | 5–0 | 2–0 | 2–1 | 4–3 | 3–1 | 4–1 | 7–0 | 2–2 | 6–1 |
| NIAC Mitra | 0–1 | 0–0 | 1–0 | | 2–0 | 1–2 | 1–2 | 0–0 | 2–0 | 3–1 | 5–0 | 12–0 | 5–0 | 8–0 |
| Pardedetex | 1–1 | 0–0 | 2–3 | 1–1 | | 3–0 | 0–0 | 0–0 | 1–1 | 2–0 | 1–1 | 4–0 | 2–1 | |
| Jaka Utama | 2–4 | 1–1 | 1–0 | 1–1 | 0–1 | | 1–0 | 1–0 | 2–0 | 2–0 | 0–1 | 5–0 | 2–0 | 1–0 |
| Perkesa '78 | 2–3 | 2–1 | 1–2 | 1–0 | 2–1 | 4–1 | | 2–1 | 1–1 | 0–1 | 0–0 | 2–2 | 2–0 | 2–1 |
| Arseto | 0–1 | 0–0 | 3–3 | 1–1 | 3–2 | 1–1 | 3–1 | | 1–0 | 3–3 | 2–0 | 2–1 | 2–0 | 5–1 |
| Tunas Inti | 1–2 | 0–3 | 1–2 | 0–1 | 2–1 | 3–2 | 1–3 | 1–1 | | 1–1 | 2–1 | 5–1 | 3–1 | 2–0 |
| Sari Bumi Raya | 1–0 | 0–2 | 0–2 | 1–4 | 1–0 | 0–0 | 1–0 | 2–2 | 1–4 | | 2–2 | 1–0 | 1–1 | |
| Cahaya Kita | 1–8 | 0–2 | 1–4 | 0–2 | 0–3 | 1–4 | 1–0 | 3–2 | 1–1 | 2–1 | | 3–2 | 2–1 | |
| Tidar Sakti | 2–2 | 1–3 | 1–1 | 2–3 | 0–1 | 1–0 | 3–2 | 1–1 | 3–2 | 4–2 | 2–4 | | 1–1 | |
| Buana Putra | 2–4 | 0–4 | 0–3 | 1–4 | 0–2 | 1–1 | 0–4 | 1–0 | 0–0 | 1–1 | 3–0 | 3–1 | | 0–2 |
| BBSA Tama | 0–5 | 0–2 | | | 0–5 | | | | | 1–2 | 1–3 | 3–1 | | |

Legend: Blue = home team win; Yellow = draw; Red = away team win.
