= I-League (Indonesia) =

Indonesian football league operator

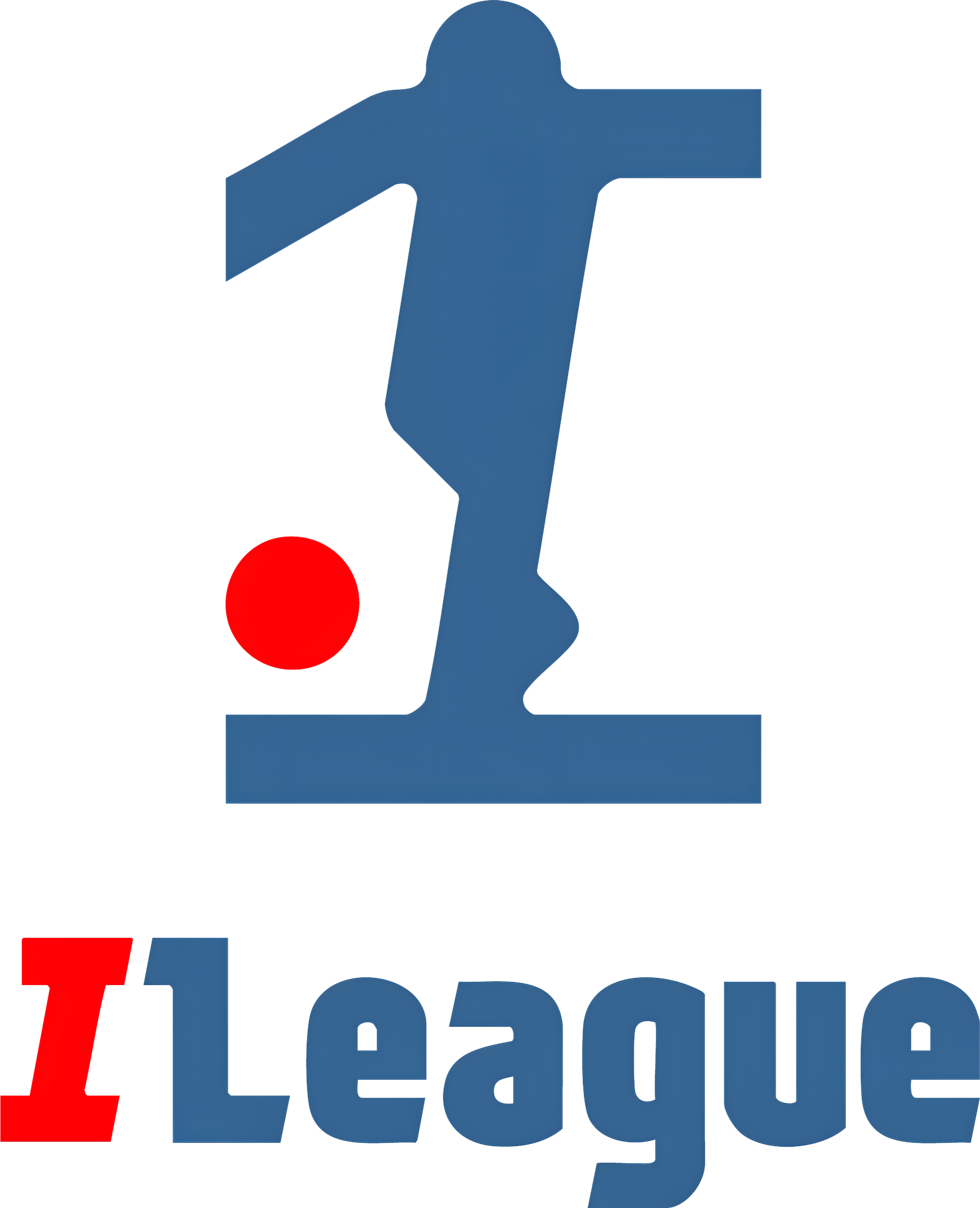
- Type: Private
- Industry: Association football
- Predecessors: Badan Liga Indonesia (BLI) (1994–2008); PT Liga Indonesia (PT. LI) (2009–2015); Badan Liga Amatir Indonesia (BLAI) (2009–2014) (Lower-Tier Competition Operators); PT Liga Prima Indonesia Sportindo (PT LPIS) (2011–2013) (Dualism of Competition Operators); PT Gelora Trisula Semesta (PT GTS) (2016) (Unofficial Competition Operators); PT Liga Indonesia Baru (PT LIB) (2017–2025)
- Founded: 11 July 2025; 15 months ago
- Headquarters: South Jakarta, Jakarta, Indonesia
- Area served: Indonesia
- Key people: Zainudin Amali (Main commissioner); Ferry Paulus (President)
- Products: Super League; Championship; Liga Nusantara; Elite Pro Academy; I-League Cup; Indonesia Women's League
- Owners: PSSI member clubs (99%); PSSI (1%)
- Subsidiaries: PT Liga Utama Indonesia (50%)
- Website: https://ileague.id/

I-League (previously known as Liga Indonesia Baru) is an Indonesian company created by the Football Association of Indonesia to operate and organise Indonesian football competitions, namely the Super League, the Championship, the Liga Nusantara, the Elite Pro Academy, the Indonesia Women's League and the I-League Cup. The company was formed to replace the PT Liga Indonesia which used to be the league operator from 2009 until 2015.

== History ==
=== Origin: PT Liga Indonesia ===
==== 2008–2011 ====
LIB was first founded as PT Liga Indonesia (English: Indonesia League) or LI in 2008 by the PSSI under Nurdin Halid's chairmanship. LI itself was a continuation of Badan Liga Indonesia (English: Indonesian League Body), the operator of professional football competitions in Indonesia after the merger between Galatama and Perserikatan from 1994 to 2008. From its founding, PSSI owned 99% of PT LI shares while an entity known as Yayasan Sepak Bola Indonesia, a foundation under Nirwan Bakrie, owned the other 1%. Meanwhile, amateur Football Competitions in Indonesia would be operated by Badan Liga Sepakbola Amatir Indonesia ( English: Indonesian Amateur League Body) which was founded in 2009. The practice continues with PT LIB.

==== 2011–2013: Dualism ====
Changes in the share composition caused internal conflict within PSSI. There were two rival claimants, Djohar Arifin Husin and La Nyalla Mattalitti. Djohar won the elections and became the chairman. He chose a new league operator, PT Liga Prima Indonesia Sportindo (LPIS). LPIS then proceeded to organise a new league, the Indonesia Premier League or Liga Primer Indonesia (2011–12) and two seasons which went unfinished (2011 and 2013). At the same time, other clubs which didn't take part in the IPL decided to hold a rival competition. Under the auspices of La Nyalla Mattalitti's Komite Penyelamat Sepakbola Indonesia (KPSI), they chose PT LI to be the operator for the Indonesia Super League for two seasons (2011–12 and 2013).

==== 2014–2016 ====
The dualism ended in 2014. PT LI became the true league operator and both IPL and ISL were merged into a unified league for the 2014 season. However, the competition in 2015 was paused due to threats of sanctions from Badan Olahraga Profesional Indonesia (BOPI) and the Ministry of Youth and Sports, because Arema Cronus and Persebaya ISL didn't get BOPI recommendations. FIFA threatened to ban Indonesian football altogether. The sanctions lasted for a year and were lifted in May 2016. PT LI was closed in the same year.

==== 2017 season ====
After the end of suspension, PSSI chose PT Liga Indonesia Baru to replace the PT Liga Indonesia as the new league operator. Despite posting a revenue of around Rp6 billion in its first season, there were concerns over unpaid commercial contributions, which were paid off by LIB in March.

==== 2023–present ====
There was a plan to create another company, specifically to operate the Liga 2. The plan was shelved for the 2023–24 Liga 2 season. In 2025, the Liga Indonesia Baru changed its name to the I-League. In 2026, the I-League finally launched a company specifically created to operate the Championship, PT Liga Utama Indonesia.

== Board of directors ==
As of July 2025

Position	Name
Main commissioner	(Indonesia) Zainudin Amali
Independent commissioner	(Indonesia) Muhammad Lutfi
Commissioner	(Indonesia) Glenn Sugita
President	(Indonesia) Ferry Paulus
Director of business	(Indonesia) Sadikin Aksa
Director of operations	(Indonesia) Asep Saputra
Competition manager	(Japan) Takeyuki Oya
