= Nasrul Koto =

Indonesian football manager (born 1965)

Personal information
- Date of birth: 10 June 1965 (age 61)
- Place of birth: Binjai, Indonesia
- Position: Striker

Senior career*
Years	Team	Apps	(Gls)
1985–1994	Arseto Solo		
1994	Semen Padang		
1995–1997	Arseto Solo		

International career
- Indonesia

Managerial career
- 2006: PSBS Bangkinang
- 2007: PSPS Pekanbaru
- 2008: PSSA Asahan
- 2009: Arseto Solo
- 2010: PSJS South Jakarta
- 2010–2011: PS Bengkulu
- 2011–2014: PSLS Lhokseumawe
- 2022–2023: PSKB Binjai
- 2024–2025: PSDS Deli Serdang (technical director)
- 2025: PSDS Deli Serdang
- 2026–: Unaaha
Medal record
Men's football
Representing Indonesia
Southeast Asian Games
Gold medal – first place	1987 Jakarta	Team
- * Club domestic league appearances and goals

Nasrul Koto (born 10 June 1965) is an Indonesian football manager and former player who played as a striker. He is the current manager of the Liga 4 club Unaaha.

== Career ==
Nasrul commenced his professional career in 1983 with PSKB Binjai. Subsequently, in 1985, he was selected to be part of the North Sumatra football team for the 11th National Sports Week in Jakarta.

He transitioned to a professional player after joined Arseto Solo. During the 1987–88 Galatama season, Nasrul emerged as the league top scorer. Furthermore, he played a pivotal role in leading Arseto Solo to win the league in 1992.

He also represented the Indonesia national team in various international tournaments. Notably, in 1987, Nasrul contributed to the Garuda team's success in securing the gold medal at the SEA Games held in Jakarta.

== Honours ==
Arseto Solo

- Galatama: 1990–92

Indonesia

- SEA Games gold medal: 1987

Individual

- Galatama top scorer: 1987–88
