= Indonesian Community Shield =

- Organiser(s): PSSI
- Founded: 2009; 17 years ago
- Abolished: 2013; 13 years ago
- Teams: 2
- Last champions: Semen Padang (1st title)
- Most championships: Persipura; Sriwijaya; Semen Padang (1 title each)

The Indonesian Community Shield was a pre-season football competition held the week before the season begins in Indonesia every year. It was contested by the winners of the Indonesia Super League/Indonesian Premier League and Piala Indonesia in the previous season, as a curtain raiser to the new season. If the same team wins both Indonesian League and Piala Indonesia, then the Community Shield is contested by the League winners and Piala Indonesia runners-up.

The current holders are Semen Padang, who defeated Persibo Bojonegoro 4–1 in the 2013 edition. Piala Indonesia was not held in many years so that the Indonesian Community Shield is not held for the season.

== History ==
Between 1990 and 1992, PSSI held tournaments that functioned similarly as the Indonesian Community Shield.

In 1990, the Piala Utama (lit. 'The Premier Cup') was established as an official tournament founded and organized by PSSI. This competition brings together each of the four best clubs from the two PSSI main competitions in the final standings of the preceiding season of Galatama and Perserikatan. The eight clubs from the two competitions are mixed and divided into two groups. Each group is filled by two Galatama clubs and two Perserikatan clubs. In the group system, the tournament plays a half competition system where each participant plays three matches. Winner and Runner Up from each group will advance to the last four. Persebaya Surabaya won the tournament in 1990, while the second tournament in 1992 was won by Pelita Jaya.

== Predecessors of Community Shield ==
=== Galatama-Perserikatan Invitational Championship ===
Friendly tournament between six Galatama clubs and top-9 finishers Perserikatan

List of finals
Year	Champions	Score	Runners-up	Stadium
1985	Arseto	0–0 (4-3 pen)	Perkesa 78	Gelora 10 November Stadium, Surabaya

=== Piala Utama ===
List of finals
Year	Champions	From	Score	Runners-up	From	Stadium
1990	Persebaya Surabaya	1989–90 Perserikatan runners-up	3–2	Pelita Jaya	1990 Galatama champions	Gelora Bung Karno Stadium, Jakarta
1992	Pelita Jaya	1990–92 Galatama third place	2–0	Persib Bandung	1991–92 Perserikatan fourth place	Gelora Bung Karno Stadium, Jakarta

=== Copa Dji Sam Soe Opening Match ===
From 2006 to 2008, the Piala Indonesia began with an exhibition match in the style of a Super Cup, though no trophy was awarded. The match typically featured the reigning Liga Indonesia Premier Division champions against the holders of the Piala Indonesia. However, because Sriwijaya FC won the double in the 2007 season, Arema was selected to participate in 2008 as the winners of the previous two Piala Indonesia editions.

Year	Winners	From	Score	Losers	From	Stadium
2006	Arema	2005 Piala Indonesia Champions	3–0	Persipura Jayapura	2005 Liga Indonesia Premier Division Champions	Kanjuruhan Stadium, Malang
2007	Persik Kediri	2006 Liga Indonesia Premier Division Champions	2–1	Arema	2006 Piala Indonesia Champions	Gelora Delta Stadium, Sidoarjo
2008	Sriwijaya FC	2007 Liga Indonesia Premier Division Champions, 2007 Piala Indonesia Champions	1–1 (4-2 pen)	Arema	2005 Piala Indonesia Champions, 2006 Piala Indonesia Champions	Gelora Sriwijaya, Palembang

== Winners ==
Year	League Winners	Result	Cup Winners	Stadium
2009	Persipura Jayapura	3–1	Sriwijaya	Mattoangin Stadium, Makassar
2010	Arema Malang	1–3	Sriwijaya	Kanjuruhan Stadium, Malang
2013	Semen Padang	4–1	Persibo Bojonegoro	Haji Agus Salim Stadium, Padang
2028				

== Performance by club ==
Club	Winners	Runners-up	Year wins	Years runners-up
Sriwijaya	1	1	2010	2009
Persipura Jayapura	1	—	2009	—
Semen Padang	1	—	2013	
Arema Malang	—	1	—	2010
Persibo Bojonegoro	—	1		2013

== See also ==
- List of Indonesian football champions
- Indonesian football league system
- Super League
- Piala Indonesia
- I-League Cup
