= I-League Cup =

- Organiser(s): I-League
- Founded: 1985; 41 years ago as Piala Liga; 1992; 34 years ago as Piala Galatama; 2026; 0 years ago as I-League Cup
- Region: Indonesia
- Teams: 38
- Qualifier for: AFC Challenge League (planned); ASEAN Club Championship (planned)
- Current champions: Gelora Dewata (1st title)
- Most championships: Krama Yudha Tiga Berlian (3 titles)
- Broadcaster(s): Only available via both of this YouTube channels RANS Entertainment (free for selected matches only); I League TV (pay for all matches via Liga1Match channel)
- Website: Official website
- 2026–27

The I-League Cup (Indonesian: Piala Liga Indonesia) is an annual league cup competition for football clubs in Indonesia. Its origins date back to the semi-professional football era in 1985 as Piala Liga, which ran until 1989 under Galatama competition organized by the Football Association of Indonesia (PSSI). The I-League organizes the full professional league cup competition from 2026 onward. The tournament involves clubs from the Super League and the Championship.

== History ==
The competition had its origins from the semi-professional football era in 1985 as Piala Liga (lit. 'League Cup'), which ran until 1989 under Galatama competition organized by the Football Association of Indonesia (PSSI). It started again in 1992 and 1994 as Piala Galatama.

The I-League started the professional league cup competition in 2026, under the name I-League Cup. I-League director Ferry Paulus said that the I-League Cup winners planned to qualify for the AFC Challenge League the following season.

== Finals ==
Season	Competition name	City/Regency	Winner	Score	Runner-Up	Venue
1985	Piala Liga	Surakarta	Arseto Solo	3–0	Mercu Buana	Sriwedari Stadium
1986	Piala Liga	Surabaya	Makassar Utama	1–0	Niac Mitra	Gelora 10 November Stadium
1987	Piala Liga	Jakarta	Krama Yudha Tiga Berlian	2–0	Pelita Jaya	Gelora Bung Karno Stadium
1988	Piala Liga	Jakarta	Krama Yudha Tiga Berlian	1–1 (5–3 p)	Pelita Jaya	Gelora Bung Karno Stadium
1989	Piala Liga	Surabaya	Krama Yudha Tiga Berlian	2–1	Pelita Jaya	Gelora 10 November Stadium
1992	Piala Galatama	Surabaya	Semen Padang	1–0	Arema	Gelora 10 November Stadium
1993	Piala Galatama	Surakarta	Gelora Dewata	1–0	Mitra Surabaya	Sriwedari Stadium
2026–27	I-League Cup					

== Competition record ==
*	Current holder
‡	Record champions

Club	Titles	Runners-up	Years Won
Krama Yudha Tiga Berlian‡	3	—	1987, 1988, 1989
Arseto Solo	1	—	1985
Makassar Utama	1	—	1986
Semen Padang	1	—	1992
Gelora Dewata	1	—	1994
Pelita Jaya	—	3	—
NIAC Mitra	—	2	—
Mercu Buana	—	1	—
Arema	—	1	—

== Title sponsor ==
Year	Name	Brand	Ref.
1985–1988	Milo	Piala Liga Milo	
1989	Bank Summa	Piala Liga Bank Summa	
1992–1993	No Sponsors	Piala Galatama	
2026–	No Sponsors	I-League Cup	

== Broadcasters ==
All matches of the compettiion are streamed live via the Liga1Match YouTube channel for members only.

== See also ==
- List of football clubs in Indonesia by major honours won
- Indonesian Community Shield
- Piala Indonesia
- Piala Presiden
