= 1980–82 Galatama =

Indonesian football league season

Galatama
- Season: 1980–82
- Dates: 11 October 1980 – 13 March 1982
- Champions: NIAC Mitra
- Matches: 306
- Goals: 816 (2.67 per match)
- Top goalscorer: Syamsul Arifin (30 goals)

The 1980–82 Galatama was the second season of Galatama which was held from 11 October 1980 to 13 March 1982.

== Changes from 1979–80 ==
The 1980–82 season saw five new clubs enter the league from PSSI's selection process, though one (BBSA Tama) withdrew midway through the previous season. The new clubs are:

- Angkasa
- UMS 80
- Mercu Buana
- Bintang Timur
- Makassar Utama

== Teams ==
- Warna Agung (Jakarta)
- Jayakarta (Jakarta)
- Tunas Inti (Jakarta)
- UMS 80 (Jakarta)
- Arseto (Jakarta)
- Angkasa (Solo) (Note: Angkasa played their home matches at Bekasi.)
- Pardedetex (Medan)
- Mercu Buana (Medan)
- Jaka Utama (Lampung)
- NIAC Mitra (Surabaya)
- Indonesia Muda (Surabaya)
- Parkesa 78 (Sidoarjo) (Note: Perkesa 78 moved from Bogor to Sidoarjo.)
- Cahaya Kita (Semarang) (Note: Cahaya Kita moved from Jakarta to Semarang.)
- Bintang Timur (Jakarta) (Note: Bintang Timur played their home matches at Cirebon.)
- Sari Bumi Raya (Yogyakarta) (Note: Sari Bumi Raya moved from Bandung to Yogyakarta.)
- Buana Putra (Bogor) (Note: Buana Putra moved from Jakarta to Bogor.)
- Tidar Sakti (Magelang)
- Makassar Utama (Makassar)

== League table ==
Pos	Team	Pld	W	D	L	GF	GA	GD	Pts	Qualification
1	NIAC Mitra (C)	34	26	5	3	102	21	+81	57	Champions
2	Jayakarta	34	22	8	4	50	12	+38	52	
3	Indonesia Muda	34	21	9	4	66	18	+48	51	
4	Warna Agung	34	18	9	7	74	30	+44	45	
5	Pardedetex	34	17	10	7	54	21	+33	44	
6	Mercu Buana	34	16	11	7	45	29	+16	43	
7	Perkesa '78	34	14	11	9	48	34	+14	39	
8	Makassar Utama	34	13	13	8	34	26	+8	39	
9	Arseto	34	14	7	13	53	41	+12	35	
10	UMS '80	34	14	7	13	48	38	+10	35	
11	Tunas Inti	34	13	9	12	46	41	+5	35	
12	Jaka Utama	34	8	16	10	44	45	−1	32	
13	Angkasa	34	10	9	15	35	44	−9	29	
14	Sari Bumi Raya	34	5	10	19	29	75	−46	20	
15	Bintang Timur	34	5	9	20	19	53	−34	19	
16	Tidar Sakti	34	3	12	19	23	75	−52	18	
17	Buana Putra	34	2	10	22	23	73	−50	14	
18	Cahaya Kita	34	1	3	30	23	140	−117	5	

Source: RSSSF
(C) Champions
