= PSKB Binjai =

Indonesian football club in North Sumatra

- Full name: Persatuan Sepakbola Kota Binjai
- Short name: PSKB
- Ground: Binjai Stadium; Binjai, North Sumatra
- Owner: Askot PSSI Binjai
- Chairman: Sofyan Syahputra Siregar
- Manager: Sofyan Syahputra Siregar
- Coach: Yudhi Setiawan
- League: Liga 4
- 2021: 5th in Group B, (North Sumatra zone)
Home colours	Away colours

Persatuan Sepakbola Kota Binjai (simply known as PSKB Binjai) is an Indonesian football club based in Binjai, North Sumatra. They currently compete in the Liga 4 and their homeground is Binjai Stadium.

== Notable former players ==
- (Indonesia) Zulkarnain Lubis
- (Indonesia) Azwardin Lubis
- (Indonesia) Peri Sandria
- (Indonesia) Nasrul Koto
- (Indonesia) Markus Haris Maulana
- (Indonesia) Aldino Herdianto
