= Nova Arianto =

Indonesian footballer

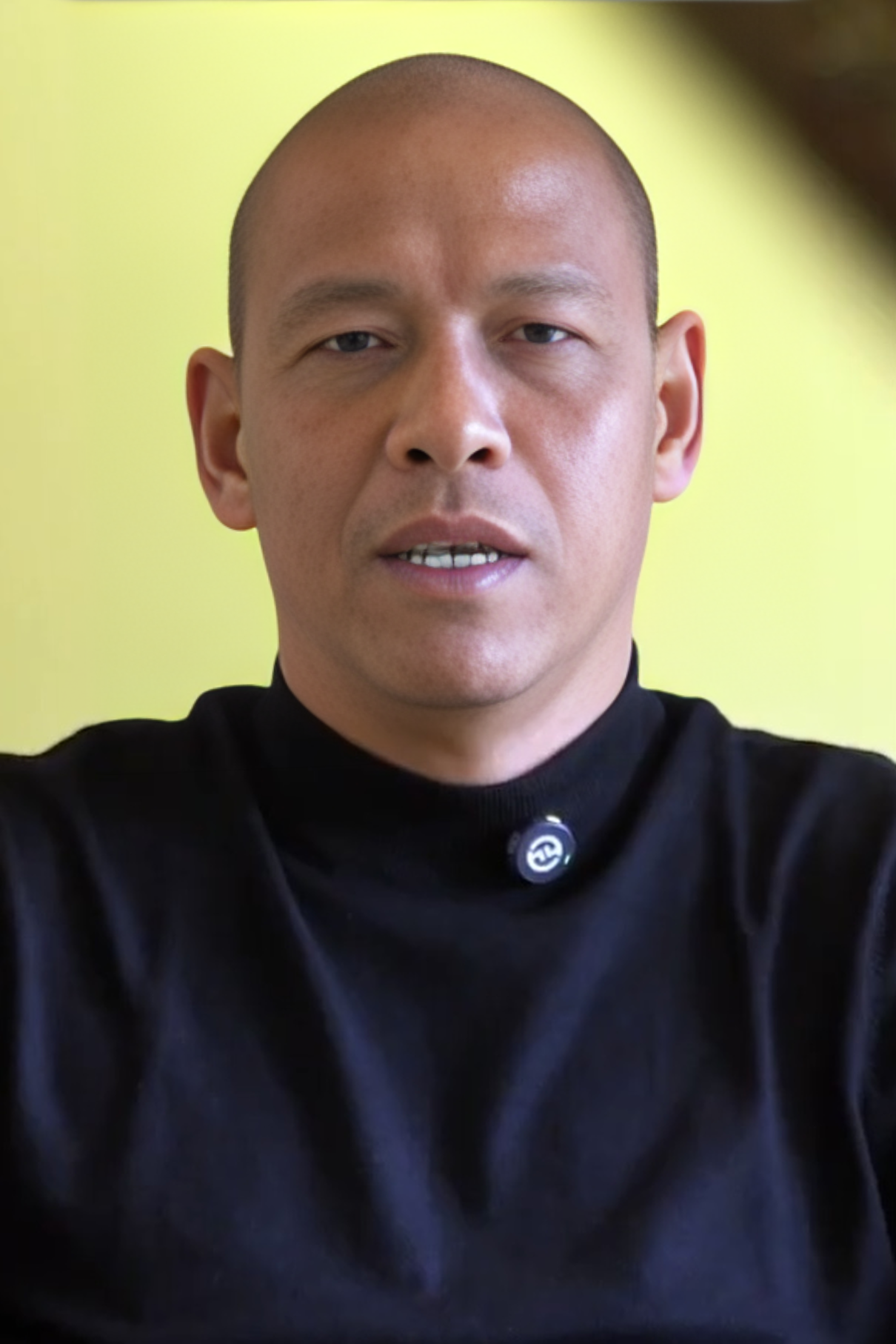
- Nova in 2024

Personal information
- Full name: Nova Arianto Sartono
- Date of birth: 4 November 1979 (age 46)
- Place of birth: Semarang, Central Java, Indonesia
- Height: 1.83 m (6 ft 0 in)
- Position: Defender

Team information
- Current team: Indonesia U20 (head coach)

Youth career
- PSIS Semarang
- 1995–1996: PSSI Baretti

Senior career*
Years	Team	Apps	(Gls)
1997–1998	Arseto Solo	3	(0)
1998–1999	PSIS Semarang	1	(0)
1999–2000	Persebaya Surabaya	8	(1)
2000	→ PSS Sleman (loan)	3	(0)
2001–2002	PSS Sleman	12	(0)
2002–2007	Persebaya Surabaya	95	(4)
2007–2011	Persib Bandung	112	(8)
2011–2012	Sriwijaya	18	(2)
2012–2015	Pelita Bandung Raya	41	(1)
Total		293	(15)

International career
1996	Indonesia U18		
2008–2010	Indonesia	12	(1)

Managerial career
- 2014–2015: Pelita Bandung Raya (assistant)
- 2016: Madiun Putra
- 2016–2017: Bhayangkara U21
- 2017–2018: Lampung Sakti
- 2019: Bhayangkara U20
- 2019–2025: Indonesia U23 (assistant)
- 2020–2023: Indonesia U20 (assistant)
- 2021–2025: Indonesia (assistant)
- 2024–2025: Indonesia U17
- 2025–: Indonesia U20
- 2026–: Indonesia (assistant)
- * Club domestic league appearances and goals

Nova Arianto Sartono (born 4 November 1979) is an Indonesian professional football coach and former player who last played for Pelita Bandung Raya as a defender and currently works as the head coach of the Indonesia national under-20 football team and also side assistant coach of Indonesia.

== Biography ==
Nova Arianto, who is a Roman Catholic, played for a very long time in Persebaya before leaving for Persib. He is used to scoring goals from corner kicks. He has played 112 times for Persib and scored 8 goals. He is the son of Persibo Bojonegoro coach Sartono Anwar and Tan Djiet Nio.

Sartono Anwar is a well-known coach who led PSIS Semarang to win the 1987 Premier Division and became one of the national team coaches from the 1980s to early 90s.

Finally, Sartono Anwar, who has also trained UMS Jakarta (Galatama), BPD Central Java (Galatama), Assyabaab Salim Group, Petrokimia Putra, Arseto Solo, Putra Samarinda, Persibo Bojonegoro led Persisam Putra Samarinda.

== International career ==
Nova made his debut for Indonesia in 2008 and has scored 1 goal against Thailand in the 2008 AFF Suzuki Cup.

The problem is that he rarely starts the first eleven for Indonesia and usually stays on the bench. He could not play in the 2010 AFF Suzuki Cup due to injury.

=== International goals ===
No.	Date	Venue	Opponent	Score	Result	Competition
1.	20 December 2008	Rajamangala Stadium, Bangkok, Thailand	Thailand	1–0	1–2	2008 AFF Championship

== Honours ==
=== Player ===
Persebaya Surabaya

- Liga Indonesia Premier Division: 2004
- Liga Indonesia First Division: 2003, 2006

Sriwijaya

- Indonesia Super League: 2011–12

Indonesia

- Indonesian Independence Cup: 2008

Individual

- Liga Indonesia First Division Best Player: 2006
