= Bambang Nurdiansyah =

Indonesian footballer and manager

Personal information
- Full name: Bambang Nurdiansyah
- Date of birth: 28 December 1960 (age 65)
- Place of birth: Banjarmasin, Indonesia
- Position: Striker

Team information
- Current team: Persipa Pati (Head Coach)

Senior career*
Years	Team	Apps	(Gls)
1978–1982	Arseto	35	(11)
1982–1983	Tunas Inti	24	(8)
1983	Tempo Utama		
1983–1985	Yanita Utama	40	(29)
1985–1986	Krama Yudha Tiga Berlian	14	(9)
1986–1992	Pelita Jaya	142	(68)
1993	Putra Samarinda	28	(13)

International career
1979	Indonesia U20		
1980–1993	Indonesia	26	(5)

Managerial career
- 2005: Indonesia (Caretaker)
- 2005: PSIS Semarang
- 2006: Pelita Krakatau Steel
- 2006–2007: Indonesia U-23 (Assistant coach)
- 2007: Pelita Jaya Jawa Barat (Technical director)
- 2008: Arema Malang
- 2008–2009: PSIS Semarang
- 2010–2011: Indonesia women
- 2011: Jakarta FC
- 2011–2012: Persiram Raja Ampat
- 2013–2014: Cilegon United
- 2015–2016: Persija Jakarta
- 2016–2017: Persita Tangerang
- 2018: PSIS Semarang
- 2018: Perserang Serang
- 2019: Cilegon United
- 2019: PSIS Semarang
- 2020: Muba BaBel United
- 2021: RANS Cilegon
- 2022–2023: Persipal Palu
- 2024–: Persipa Pati
- * Club domestic league appearances and goals

Bambang Nurdiansyah (born 28 December 1960 in Banjarmasin, East Kalimantan, Indonesia) is an Indonesian football coach and former footballer.

== Playing career ==
Before becoming a coach, he was a footballer, mostly with Pelita Jaya and Indonesia national football team for 11 years (1980–1991). He also played for Yanita Utama and Krama Yudha Tiga Berlian on the Galatama era on 1980s.

== Managerial career ==
In the 2008 season Nurdiansyah coached Indonesia Super League club, Arema Indonesia, but withdrew having just undergone four matches due to feeling pressured by Arema's support groups, Aremania. He later went to coach PSIS Semarang in the 2008/09 season. He coached PSIS before in 2005, winning trophies for the club, but resigned due to family reason.

Previously he had trained Pelita Krakatau Steel in 2006. In addition, Bambang also trained Persita Tangerang.

In 2005, after the end of the league season, Bambang appointed by the PSSI to train the Indonesia national football team to contest against South Africa national football team in the match of the anniversary of the Golongan Karya or Golkar, a political party in the country.

He also coached the Indonesia women's national football team at SEA Games.

He was managed soccer club in Persiram Raja Ampat of West Papua, now in Southwest Papua, that played at the 2011-12 Indonesia Super League.

He was awarded as one of 22 Indonesia football legends on the final of Piala Indonesia on 2007

During his time coaching Cilegon United F.C., he promote them to Liga Indonesia Premier Division in 2014 after winning Liga Indonesia First Division and Liga Indonesia Second Division in two years.

== Honours ==
=== Club ===
Yanita Utama

- Galatama (2): 1983–84, 1984

Krama Yudha Tiga Berlian

- Galatama (1): 1985

Pelita Jaya

- Galatama (2): 1989–90, 1990

=== International ===
Indonesia

- SEA Games gold medal: 1991

=== Managerial ===
Cilegon United

- Liga Indonesia First Division (1): 2014
- Liga Indonesia Second Division (1): 2013

=== Individual ===
- Galatama Top Goalscorer (3): 1983–84, 1984, 1985, 1990
