= Dede Sulaeman =

Indonesian footballer (1956–2026)

Personal information
- Date of birth: 8 May 1956
- Place of birth: Jakarta, Indonesia
- Date of death: 25 January 2026 (aged 69)
- Place of death: Bekasi, Indonesia
- Height: 1.70 m (5 ft 7 in)
- Position: Striker

Youth career
- –1974: Persija Jakarta

Senior career*
Years	Team	Apps	(Gls)
1974–1979	Persija Jakarta	10	(6)
1979–1986	Indonesia Muda		

International career
1978–1985	Indonesia	36	(9)
Medal record
Men's football
Representing Indonesia
Southeast Asian Games
Silver medal – second place	1979 Jakarta	Team
- * Club domestic league appearances and goals

Dede Sulaeman (8 May 1956 – 25 January 2026) was an Indonesian footballer who played as a striker for Persija Jakarta and Indonesia national team in the 1970s to 1980s. He was part of the national team when Indonesia almost qualified for the 1986 World Cup in Mexico before being defeated by South Korea. Dede was known for his agility and sharpness in the opponent's penalty box. He was the top scorer for Galatama in the 1982–83 competition season with 17 goals. Dede retired at the age of 30 after he chose to work at Pertamina.

== Career ==
Throughout his career, Dede only played for two clubs, Persija Jakarta in Perserikatan and Indonesia Muda in Galatama. Alongside Persija, Dede led the under-18 team to win the 1974 Soeratin Cup and the senior team to win the league title in 1979. Dede then moved to Indonesia Muda which was fostered by Pertamina until he retired in 1985.

== Death ==
On 25 January 2026, Dede died after collapsing while playing football at Betos Field, Bekasi. He was 69.

== Career statistics ==
Scores and results list Indonesia's goal tally first, score column indicates score after each Dede goal.

List of international goals scored by Dede Sulaeman
No.	Date	Venue	Opponent	Score	Result	Competition
1	4 July 1979	Merdeka Stadium, Kuala Lumpur, Malaysia	Malaysia	2–2	1–1	1979 Merdeka Tournament
2	23 September 1979	Gelora Senayan Stadium, Jakarta, Indonesia	Thailand	1–0	1–3	1979 SEA Games
3	24 March 1980	Merdeka Stadium, Kuala Lumpur, Malaysia	Brunei	2–2	2–3	1980 Summer Olympics qualification
4	6 October 1983	Gelora Senayan Stadium, Jakarta, Indonesia	Saudi Arabia	1–0	1–1	1984 Summer Olympics qualification
5	26 October 1983	Merdeka Stadium, Kuala Lumpur, Malaysia	Singapore	1–0	1–1	1984 Summer Olympics qualification
6	15 March 1985	Gelora Senayan Stadium, Jakarta, Indonesia	Thailand	1–0	1–0	1986 FIFA World Cup qualification
7	18 March 1985	Gelora Senayan Stadium, Jakarta, Indonesia	Bangladesh	2–0	2–0	1986 FIFA World Cup qualification
8	6 April 1985	Salt Lake Stadium, Calcutta, India	India	1–0	1–1	1986 FIFA World Cup qualification
9	30 July 1985	Gelora Senayan Stadium, Jakarta, Indonesia	South Korea	1–4	1–4	1986 FIFA World Cup qualification

== Honours ==
Persija Jakarta U18

- Soeratin Cup: 1974

Persija Jakarta

- Perserikatan: 1978–79

Indonesia

- SEA Games silver medal: 1979

Individual

- Galatama top goalscorer: 1982–83
