= Football at the 1987 SEA Games =

1987 SEA Games Football
Tournament details
- Host country: Indonesia
- City: Jakarta
- Dates: 10–20 September
- Teams: 6
- Venue: Gelora Senayan Main Stadium

Final positions
- Champions: Indonesia (1st title)
- Runners-up: Malaysia
- Third place: Thailand
- Fourth place: Burma

Tournament statistics
- Matches played: 10
- Goals scored: 22 (2.2 per match)
- Top scorer: (Thailand) Piyapong Pue-on (4 goals)

Football was contested as part of the programme for the 1987 Southeast Asian Games which was hosted in Jakarta, Indonesia from 9 to 20 September 1987. It was the 14th edition of the men's football tournament at the multi-sport event organised by the SEA Games Federation Committee.

The football tournament began with the first matches of the group stage on 10 September 1987 and ended with the gold medal match on 20 September 1987. Three-time defending champions Thailand lost their crown after losing to Malaysia in the semi-finals. Hosts Indonesia and Malaysia contested the final. Indonesia defeated Malaysia 1–0 after extra time to win the gold medal. In the bronze medal match, Thailand defeated Burma 4–0.

== Background ==
Football had been part of the Southeast Asian Games programme following the debut of the men's competition at the inaugural 1959 SEAP Games in Thailand. Thailand were three-time defending champions after defeating Singapore 2–0 in the gold medal match at the previous edition in 1985. Burma and Thailand were the most successful teams having both won the gold medal five times previously.

Burma entered a youth team with an average age of 19. Their matches are still considered full internationals by FIFA.

== Format ==
In total, six teams took part in the competition. They were drawn into two single round robin groups of three teams. The winners and runners-up would then contest the semi-finals which would decide the teams contesting the gold and bronze medal matches.

=== Participants ===
- Brunei
- Burma
- Indonesia
- Malaysia
- Singapore
- Thailand

== Venue ==
Matches were played at the Gelora Senayan Main Stadium in Jakarta, Indonesia.

== Group stage ==
=== Group A ===
Burma and Malaysia advanced to the semi-finals.

==== Table ====
| Pos | Team | Pld | W | D | L | GF | GA | GD | Pts | Qualification |
|---|---|---|---|---|---|---|---|---|---|---|
| 1 | Burma | 2 | 0 | 2 | 0 | 2 | 2 | 0 | 2 | Advance to semi-finals |
| 2 | Malaysia | 2 | 0 | 2 | 0 | 2 | 2 | 0 | 2 | Advance to semi-finals |
| 3 | Singapore | 2 | 0 | 2 | 0 | 0 | 0 | 0 | 2 | |

==== Matches ====
10 September 1987

| Singapore | 0–0 | Malaysia |

Senayan Stadium, Jakarta

12 September 1987

| Malaysia | 2–2 | Burma |
|---|---|---|
| Shahdan 41'; Radhi 81' | | Than Toe Aung 45'; Zaw 54' |

Senayan Stadium, Jakarta

14 September 1987

| Singapore | 0–0 | Burma |

Senayan Stadium, Jakarta

=== Group B ===
Thailand and Indonesia advanced to the semi-finals.

==== Table ====
| Pos | Team | Pld | W | D | L | GF | GA | GD | Pts | Qualification |
|---|---|---|---|---|---|---|---|---|---|---|
| 1 | Thailand | 2 | 1 | 1 | 0 | 3 | 1 | +2 | 3 | Advance to semi-finals |
| 2 | Indonesia | 2 | 1 | 1 | 0 | 2 | 0 | +2 | 3 | Advance to semi-finals |
| 3 | Brunei | 2 | 0 | 0 | 2 | 1 | 5 | −4 | 0 | |

==== Matches ====
10 September 1987

| Thailand | 3–1 | Brunei |
|---|---|---|
| Pue-on 14', 23'; Pankhao 55' | | Rani 33' |

Senayan Stadium, Jakarta

12 September 1987

| Indonesia | 2–0 | Brunei |

Senayan Stadium, Jakarta

14 September 1987

| Indonesia | 0–0 | Thailand |

Senayan Stadium, Jakarta

== Semi-finals ==
Malaysia defeated Thailand and Indonesia defeated Burma to advance to the gold medal match.

16 September 1987

| Thailand | 0–2 | Malaysia |
|---|---|---|
| | | Mustapha 68'; Salleh 73' |

Senayan Stadium, Jakarta

17 September 1987

| Indonesia | 4–1 | Burma |
|---|---|---|
| Nere 54'; Kiswanto 61'; Yacobi 68'; Darwis 73' | | Than Toe Aung 7' |

Senayan Stadium, Jakarta
Attendance: 75,000

== Bronze medal match ==
Thailand defeated Burma to win the bronze medal.

19 September 1987

| Thailand | 4–0 | Burma |
|---|---|---|
| Pue-on (x2); Unknown (x2) |

Senayan Stadium, Jakarta

== Gold medal match ==
Indonesia defeated Malaysia after extra time to win the gold medal.

20 September 1987

| Indonesia | 1–0 (a.e.t.) | Malaysia |
|---|---|---|
| Waidi 91' |

Senayan Stadium, Jakarta
Attendance: 120,000
Referee: Booncherd Pratumthong (Thailand)
