= Ricky Yacobi =

Indonesian footballer (1963–2020)

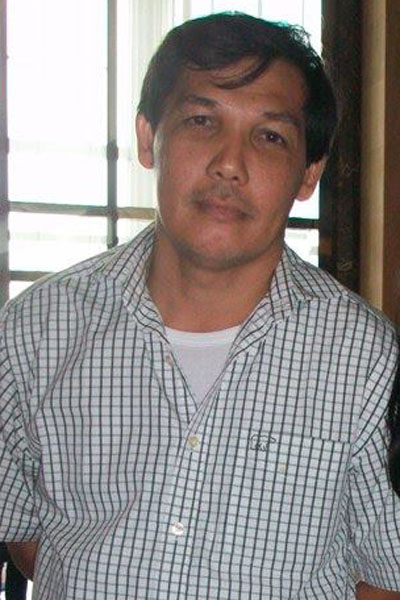
- Yacobi in 2011

Personal information
- Date of birth: 12 March 1963
- Place of birth: Medan, Indonesia
- Date of death: 21 November 2020 (aged 57)
- Place of death: Jakarta, Indonesia
- Height: 1.77 m (5 ft 10 in)
- Position: Striker

Youth career
- –1979: Perisai
- 1979–1980: PSMS Medan

Senior career*
Years	Team	Apps	(Gls)
1980–1982	PSMS Medan		
1982–1988	Arseto Solo	112	(36)
1988–1989	Matsushita Electric	6	(1)
1989–1992	Arseto Solo	73	(38)
1992–1993	BPD Jateng	28	(11)
1993–1995	PSIS Semarang		

International career
1983–1993	Indonesia	42	(11)
Medal record
Men's football
Representing Indonesia
Southeast Asian Games
Bronze medal – third place	1989 Kuala Lumpur	Team
Gold medal – first place	1987 Jakarta	Team
- * Club domestic league appearances and goals

Ricky Yacobi (born Ricky; 12 March 1963 – 21 November 2020) was an Indonesian football player. He usually played as a striker and was one of the most prominent Indonesian footballers of the 1980s. His nickname was the "Indonesian Paul Breitner". He made a name for himself at the 1986 Asian Games when he led the Indonesia national team to the semi-finals.

== Early life ==
Ricky was born on 12 March 1963 in Medan, North Sumatra. His father, Yacob, came from Manado, North Sulawesi, while his mother came from Medan itself. He was born mononymously with a single name, Ricky, and subsequently adopted his father's name, Yacob, as his last name. However, during his time playing football in Japan, he found that many people pronounced his name as "Yacobi" for ease of pronunciation, and he chose to embrace this variation.

== Club career ==
Yacobi started his football career by joining the PSMS Medan youth club, Putra Abadi. In 1978, he moved to Srinaga. His great talent then led him to join Teras and then Perisai which was fostered by the Directorate General of Taxes and trained by Wibisono.

In 1980, he was recruited by PSMS Medan and played for the under-18 team, which successfully won the Soeratin Cup that year. Subsequently, he, along with several of his teammates, including Juanda, Supardi, and Bambang Usmanto, was promoted to the senior team by the coach at that time, Yuswardi. He played with PSMS Medan in the Perserikatan tournament until 1985, after he was recruited by Arseto Solo, a club competing in Galatama.

During his five-year tenure at PSMS Medan, Yacobi contributed to the team by securing two Perserikatan titles, specifically in the seasons of 1983 and 1985.

In 1988, Japanese club Matsushita Electric (currently known as Gamba Osaka) bought him, but he was unable to make a significant impact on the team due to difficulties in adapting to the climate and weather conditions. He only played 6 games for the club, scoring one goal before returning to Arseto Solo the following year.

== International career ==
He was a part of the Indonesia national team during the 1987 and 1989 Southeast Asian Games, where he contributed to the team's achievements of winning gold and bronze medals, respectively.

== Personal life ==
Born as a Muslim, he initiated a profound study of his religious teachings following his return from Japan in 1989.

Yacobi was married to Harly Ramayani. Their child, Sabihisma Arsyi, is a former swimming athlete who is currently pursuing triathlon.

After retiring as a footballer, Yacobi opened a football school called Sekolah Sepak Bola (SSB) Ricky Yacobi in Jakarta, which he operated. He also served as manager of one of the first Indonesian division clubs, Jakarta Matador FC.

== Death ==
On 21 November 2020 Yacobi died of a heart attack while playing football with several former national team players and journalists at Senayan A Field, Gelora Bung Karno Sports Complex. One of his teammates said that Yacobi suddenly fell when he was about to celebrate after scoring a goal. He was rushed to the nearby Mintohardjo Naval Hospital, but was pronounced dead.

== Career statistics ==
=== International ===
Appearances and goals by national team and year
National team	Year	Apps	Goals
Indonesia	1983	7	0
Indonesia	1986	5	2
Indonesia	1987	8	5
Indonesia	1988	7	2
Indonesia	1989	7	1
Indonesia	1991	3	0
Indonesia	1993	5	1
Total		42	11

Indonesia score listed first, score column indicates score after each Yacobi goal.

List of international goals scored by Ricky Yacobi
No.	Date	Venue	Cap	Opponent	Score	Result	Competition
1	16 February 1986	Gelora Senayan Stadium, Jakarta, Indonesia	8	Paraguay	2–2	2–3	Friendly
2	1 October 1986	Olympic Stadium, Seoul, South Korea	10	United Arab Emirates	1–0	2–2	1986 Asian Games
3	26 April 1987	Gelora Senayan Stadium, Jakarta, Indonesia	15	Singapore	2–1	2–1	1988 Summer Olympics qualification
4	26 June 1987	Gelora Senayan Stadium, Jakarta, Indonesia	16	Japan	1–0	1–2	1988 Summer Olympics qualification
5	12 September 1987	Gelora Senayan Stadium, Jakarta, Indonesia	17	Brunei	1–0	2–0	1987 SEA Games
6	12 September 1987	Gelora Senayan Stadium, Jakarta, Indonesia	17	Brunei	2–0	2–0	1987 SEA Games
7	17 September 1987	Gelora Senayan Stadium, Jakarta, Indonesia	19	Myanmar	3–1	4–1	1987 SEA Games
8	14 January 1988	Suphachalasai Stadium, Bangkok, Thailand	21	Thailand	1–2	3–3	Friendly
9	17 June 1988	Gelora Senayan Stadium, Jakarta, Indonesia	22	South Yemen	1–0	1–0	1990 FIFA World Cup qualification
10	23 August 1989	Merdeka Stadium, Kuala Lumpur, Malaysia	21	Philippines	3–1	5–1	1989 SEA Games
11	15 June 1993	National Stadium, Kallang, Singapore	22	Philippines	3–1	3–1	1993 SEA Games

== Honours ==
PSMS Medan U18

- Soeratin Cup: 1980

PSMS Medan

- Perserikatan: 1983, 1985

Arseto Solo

- Galatama: 1990–92
- Galatama-Perserikatan Invitational Championship: 1987

Indonesia

- SEA Games gold medal: 1987; bronze medal: 1989

Individual

- Galatama top scorers: 1986–87, 1990

Preceded by Herry Kiswanto	Indonesian Captain; 1987–1990	Succeeded by Ferril Hattu
