= Football at the 1981 SEA Games =

1981 SEA Games Football
Tournament details
- Host country: Philippines
- Dates: 6–15 December
- Teams: 6
- Venues: 2 (in 2 host cities)

Final positions
- Champions: Thailand (3rd title)
- Runners-up: Malaysia
- Third place: Indonesia
- Fourth place: Singapore

Tournament statistics
- Matches played: 10
- Goals scored: 28 (2.8 per match)

Football was contested as part of the programme for the 1981 Southeast Asian Games which was hosted in Manila, Philippines from 6 to 15 December 1981. It was the 11th edition of the men's football tournament at the multi-sport event organised by the SEA Games Federation Committee.

The football tournament began with the first matches of the group stage on 6 December 1981 and ended with the gold medal match on 15 December 1981. Two-time defending champions Malaysia and Thailand contested the final. Thailand defeated Malaysia 2–1 to win the gold medal. In the bronze medal match, Indonesia defeated Singapore 2–0.

== Background ==
Football had been part of the Southeast Asian Games programme following the debut of the men's competition at the inaugural 1959 SEAP Games in Thailand. Malaysia were two-time defending champions after defeating hosts Indonesia 1–0 in the gold medal match at the previous edition in 1979. Burma were the most successful team having won the gold medal five times previously.

== Format ==
In total, six teams took part in the competition. They were drawn into two single round robin groups of three teams. The winners and runners-up would then contest the semi-finals which would decide the teams contesting the gold and bronze medal matches.

=== Participants ===
- Burma
- Indonesia
- Malaysia
- Philippines
- Singapore
- Thailand

== Venues ==
Matches were played at the Rizal Memorial Stadium in Manila and the University of Life Stadium, Pasig.

== Group stage ==
=== Group A ===
Malaysia and Thailand advanced to the semi-finals.

==== Table ====
| Pos | Team | Pld | W | D | L | GF | GA | GD | Pts | Qualification |
|---|---|---|---|---|---|---|---|---|---|---|
| 1 | Malaysia | 2 | 1 | 1 | 0 | 3 | 2 | +1 | 3 | Advance to the semi-finals |
| 2 | Thailand | 2 | 0 | 2 | 0 | 5 | 5 | 0 | 2 | Advance to the semi-finals |
| 3 | Burma | 2 | 0 | 1 | 1 | 3 | 4 | −1 | 1 | |

==== Matches ====
6 December 1981

| Malaysia | 1–0 | Burma |

Rizal Memorial Stadium, Manila

8 December 1981

| Malaysia | 2–2 | Thailand |

University of Life Stadium, Pasig

11 December 1981

| Thailand | 3–3 | Burma |

University of Life Stadium, Pasig

=== Group B ===
Indonesia and Singapore advanced to the semi-finals.

==== Table ====
| Pos | Team | Pld | W | D | L | GF | GA | GD | Pts | Qualification |
|---|---|---|---|---|---|---|---|---|---|---|
| 1 | Indonesia | 2 | 2 | 0 | 0 | 3 | 0 | +3 | 4 | Advance to the semi-finals |
| 2 | Singapore | 2 | 1 | 0 | 1 | 4 | 1 | +3 | 2 | Advance to the semi-finals |
| 3 | Philippines | 2 | 0 | 0 | 2 | 0 | 6 | −6 | 0 | |

==== Matchs ====
7 December 1981

| Indonesia | 1–0 | Singapore |

University of Life Stadium, Pasig

9 December 1981

| Singapore | 4–0 | Philippines |

University of Life Stadium, Pasig

11 December 1981

| Indonesia | 2–0 | Philippines |

University of Life Stadium, Pasig

== Semi-finals ==
Malaysia defeated Singapore on penalties and Thailand defeated Indonesia to advance to the gold medal match.

13 December 1981

| Malaysia | 1–1 (a.e.t.) | Singapore |
Penalties
| | 5–4 |

University of Life Stadium, Pasig
13 December 1981

| Thailand | 2–1 | Indonesia |

University of Life Stadium, Pasig

== Bronze medal match ==
Indonesia defeated Singapore to win the bronze medal.

14 December 1981

| Indonesia | 2–0 | Singapore |

University of Life Stadium, Pasig

== Gold medal match ==
Thailand defeated Malaysia to win the gold medal.

15 December 1981

| Thailand | 2–1 | Malaysia |

Rizal Memorial Stadium, Manila
