= Warna Agung =

Association football team in Indonesia

PS Warna Agung
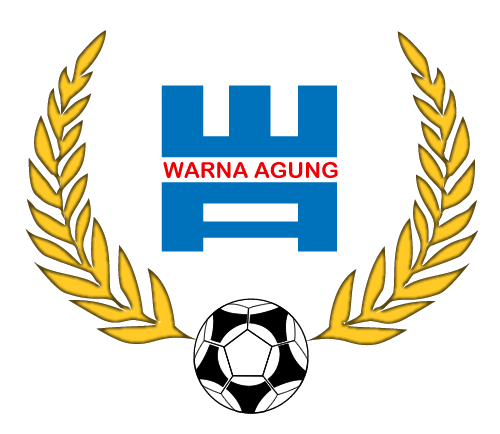
- Full name: Perserikatan Sepakbola Warna Agung Jakarta
- Nickname: The Grand Color
- Founded: 1971
- Dissolved: 1995
- Ground: Gelora Bung Karno Stadium
- Capacity: 80.000
- Owner: PT. Warna Agung
- CEO: (Indonesia) Benny Mulyono
- League: Galatama
Home colours

PS Warna Agung was an Indonesian football club based in Jakarta. The team played in The Indonesian Liga Sepakbola Utama - Galatama.

== Former players ==
Note: Flags indicate national team as defined under FIFA eligibility rules; some limited exceptions apply. Players may hold more than one non-FIFA nationality.

No.	Pos.	Nation	Player
—		IDN	Maman Suryaman
—	DF	IDN	Simson Rumah Pasal
—	MF	IDN	Ronny Pattinasarany
—	FW	IDN	Risdianto
—	FW	IDN	Timo Scheunemann
—	FW	IDN	Stevanus Sirey
—		IDN	Dudung Abdulah
—	FW	IDN	Widodo C. Putro
—		IDN	Ahmad Latif
—		IDN	Karyono Suparjo

== Former coach ==
- (Indonesia) Endang Witarsa

== Season-by-season records ==
Season	League/Division	Tms.	Pos.	Piala Indonesia
Galatama era
1979–80	Galatama Premier Division	14	1	–
1980–82	Galatama Premier Division	18	4	–
1982–83	Galatama Premier Division	15	4	–
1983–84	Galatama Premier Division	18	Group stage	–
1984	Galatama Premier Division	12	5	–
1985	Galatama Premier Division	8	7	–
1986–87	Galatama Premier Division	9	8	–
1987–88	Galatama Premier Division	14	13	–
1988–89	Galatama Premier Division	18	12	–
1990	Galatama Premier Division	18	18	–
1990–92	Galatama Premier Division	20	20	–
1992–93	Galatama Premier Division	17	17	–
1993–94	Galatama Premier Division	18	9th, West division	–
Liga Indonesia era
1994–95	Liga Indonesia Premier Division	34	17th, West division	–
