= Yanita Utama =

Indonesian football club

- Full name: Yanita Utama
- Founded: 1979 (as Jaka Utama)
- Dissolved: 1985
- Ground: Pajajaran Stadium; Bogor, Indonesia
- President: Pitoyo Haryanto
- League: Galatama
Home colours

Yanita Utama football club was an Indonesian semi-professional association football club based in Bogor, West Java.

== History ==
The club was founded in 1979 under the name Jaka Utama, headquartered in Lampung. It was involved in a bribery case in Lampung, then Jaka Utama was bought by a businessman from Pitoyo Haryanto from Bogor and changed its name to Yanita Utama in 1983 by paying compensation of 25 million rupiah. The introduction and inauguration of the new name was carried out by holding a small tournament called the 1983 Yanita Utama Cup, which was held at the Persija Stadium, Menteng, Central Jakarta. Only four clubs took part in the championship, namely Mercu Buana (Medan), Pardedetex (Medan), Arseto (Solo), and Yanita Utama (Bogor) as hosts.

Besides aiming to introduce the name of Yanita Utama, the tournament was also intended to raise funds for the improvement of the Pajajaran Stadium, Bogor.

In the title Galatama 1983/1984 season, Yanita Utama participated and immediately won. That season was the first time Galatama used the final round format. The big four from the western and eastern regions strolled into the last 8. In the final, Yanita Utama defeated Mercu Buana 1–0. The winning goal was scored by Bujang Nasril.

Yanita Utama's glory in their first season following Galatama could not be separated from the role of the star players at the time, such as Joko Malis, Rudy Keltjes, Bambang Nurdiansyah, etc. This was conveyed by Maura Helly, one of the players who helped bring the champion Yanita Utama.

Yanita Utama Bogor were collapsed in 1985 and all players move to Krama Yudha Tiga Berlian Palembang.

== Honours ==
- Champion of Galatama in 1983–1984
- Champion of Galatama in 1984
