= Galatama =

Former Indonesian football league

- Founded: 1979
- Folded: 1994
- Replaced by: Merged with Perserikatan into Liga Indonesia
- Country: Indonesia
- Confederation: AFC
- Level on pyramid: 1 (1979–1982, 1983–1989, 1991-1994); 1–2 (1982–1983, 1990)
- Domestic cup: Piala Galatama
- Most championships: NIAC Mitra; Pelita Jaya (3 titles each)

Liga Sepak Bola Utama (English: Premier Football League), commonly known by its acronym Galatama, was a semi professional football league in Indonesia, established in 1979 by the Indonesian Football Association, PSSI. Prior to the establishment of the competition, an amateur football league named Perserikatan had existed since 1931. Both Perserikatan and Galatama existed and run in parallel until they were both merged to form a new, unified league called Liga Indonesia in 1994.

== History ==
Until 1979, the Perserikatan, an amateur competition, was the only national-level competition in Indonesia. Starting in 1979, Football Association of Indonesia started a semi-professional league, named Liga Sepak Bola Utama, shortened to Galatama. Galatama is one of the pioneers of professional and semi-professional football league in Asia alongside the Hong Kong League.

Throughout its history, Galatama always operated in a single-division format except that it was divided into two divisions for the 1982–83 and 1990 seasons.

Until the 1982–83 season, Galatama allowed the recruitment of foreign players. One of the most famous foreign players in the competition is Fandi Ahmad (Singapore) who played for NIAC Mitra. He successfully led his club to win the Galatama title and he also became an honorary citizen of Surabaya as an award for his performances with NIAC Mitra. Fandi Ahmad and other foreign players were forced to ply their trade outside of Indonesia after the league banned foreign players.

Galatama suffered a decline in its final years. The cause of the decline is blamed on the banning of foreign players, match-fixing allegations, and referee bribery scandals. The declining popularity of the league amongst the Indonesian football fans forced many of the league's member clubs to gradually withdraw.

In 1994, Galatama and Perserikatan were merged into the fully professional Liga Indonesia.

== List of champions ==
Season	Champions	Result	Runners-up
1979–80	Warna Agung		Jayakarta
1980–82	NIAC Mitra		Jayakarta
1982–83	NIAC Mitra	3–2	UMS 80
1983–84	Yanita Utama	1–0	Mercu Buana
1984	Yanita Utama	2–0	UMS 80
1985	Krama Yudha Tiga Berlian	1–0	Arseto
1986–87	Krama Yudha Tiga Berlian	4–2	Pelita Jaya
1987–88	NIAC Mitra	3–1	Pelita Jaya
1988–89	Pelita Jaya	2–1	NIAC Mitra
1990	Pelita Jaya	1–1 (a.e.t.) (4–2 pen.)	Krama Yudha Tiga Berlian
1990–92	Arseto		Pupuk Kaltim
1992–93	Arema Malang		Pupuk Kaltim
1993–94	Pelita Jaya	1–0	Gelora Dewata

== List of top scorers ==
Season	Player	Club	Goals
1979–80	Hadi Ismanto	Indonesia Muda	22
1980–82	Syamsul Arifin	NIAC Mitra	30
1982–83	Dede Sulaeman	Indonesia Muda	17
1983–84	Bambang Nurdiansyah	Yanita Utama	16
1984	Bambang Nurdiansyah	Yanita Utama	13
1985	Bambang Nurdiansyah	Krama Yudha Tiga Berlian	9
1986–87	Ricky Yacobi	Arseto	9
1987–88	Nasrul Koto	Arseto	16
1988–89	Mecky Tata & Dadang Kurnia	Arema Malang & Bandung Raya	18
1990	Bambang Nurdiansyah	Pelita Jaya	15
1990–92	Singgih Pitono	Arema Malang	21
1992–93	Singgih Pitono	Arema Malang	16
1993–94	Ansyari Lubis	Pelita Jaya	19
