= Arseto F.C. =

Indonesian football club

Arseto
- Full name: Arseto Football Club
- Nicknames: The Cannons; Si Biru Langit (The Sky Blues)
- Founded: 1978; as PS Arseto
- Dissolved: 1998
- Ground: Sriwedari Stadium (1983–1998); Gelora Senayan Main Stadium (1978–1983)
- League: Liga Indonesia Premier Division
- Final season; 1997–98: season abandoned
Home colours	Away colours

Arseto Football Club, which is commonly referred to simply as Arseto, was an Indonesian football club based in Solo, Central Java, Indonesia. They last played in the Liga Indonesia Premier Division.

The club was established in 1978 by Sigit Harjojudanto, who was the son of former President Suharto. At first, the club was based in Jakarta. However, the club moved to Solo in 1983 after Suharto declared 9 September as National Sports Day during the inauguration of Sriwedari Stadium. During its existence the club won the 1990–92 Galatama title, as well as the 1985 Piala Galatama and 1985 Galatama-Perserikatan Invitational Championship. The team's home colours were blue, so they were dubbed the Sky Blue Team and The White Buffalo. Arseto was dissolved in 1998 due to the political crisis and riots that year.

== Honours ==
Domestic
League/Division	Titles	Runners-up	Seasons won	Seasons runners-up
Galatama	1	1	1990–92	1985
Cup Competitions	Titles	Runners-up	Seasons won	Seasons runners-up
Piala Galatama	1	0	1985	
Galatama-Perserikatan Invitational Championship	1	0	1985	

=== AFC (Asian competitions) ===
- Asian Club Championship
  - 1992–93 – Group stage

== Season-by-season records ==
Season	League/Division	Tms.	Pos.	Piala Indonesia
1994–95	Premier Division	34	7th, West division	–
1995–96	Premier Division	31	13th, West division	–
1996–97	Premier Division	33	7th, Central division	–
1997–98	Premier Division	31	did not finish	–

== Continental record ==
Season	Competition	Round	Club	Home	Away	Aggregate
1992–93	Asian Club Championship	First round	(Vietnam) Hải Quan	0–0	3–2	3–2
1992–93	Asian Club Championship	Second round	(Brunei) Kota Ranger	1–1	2–1	3–2
1992–93	Asian Club Championship	Third round	(Thailand) Thai Farmers Bank	3–0	0–2	3–2
1992–93	Asian Club Championship	Group A	(Japan) Yomiuri	0–3		4th
1992–93	Asian Club Championship	Group A	(Saudi Arabia) Al-Shabab	0–3		4th
1992–93	Asian Club Championship	Group A	(Bahrain) Muharraq	0–3		4th

== Notable former players ==
Some Arseto players had competed for Indonesia national football team.

- (Indonesia) Abdul Kadir
- (Indonesia) Ricky Yacobi
- (Indonesia) Eddy Harto
- (Indonesia) Nasrul Koto
- (Indonesia) Eduard Tjong
- (Indonesia) Tonggo Tambunan
- (Indonesia) Edu Hombert
- (Indonesia) Yunus Mukhtar
- (Indonesia) Benny V. B.
- (Indonesia) Rochy Putiray
