= Football at the 1999 SEA Games – Men's team squads =

Below are the squads for the Football at the 1999 SEA Games, hosted by Philippine, which took place between 1 and 14 December 1999.

== Group A ==
=== Laos ===
Coach: Songphu Phongsa

No.	Pos.	Player	Date of birth (age)	Caps	Club
1	GK	Valiya Sychanthongthip			(Laos)
2	DF	Khamsay Chanthavong	28 March 1972 (aged 27)		(Laos)
3	DF	Sonephet Phetsalath	12 July 1981 (aged 18)		(Laos)
4	DF	Phoukham Phetnantho	4 August 1981 (aged 17)		(Laos)
5	MF	Chalana Luang-Amath	10 May 1972 (aged 27)		(Laos)
6	DF	Ananh Thepsouvanh	21 October 1981 (aged 17)		(Laos)
7	MF	Saysamone Phothilad	2 October 1983 (aged 15)		(Laos)
8	DF	Bounmy Thamavongsa	22 December 1971 (aged 27)		(Laos)
9	FW	Bounlap Khenkitisack	18 June 1966 (aged 33)		(Laos)
10	MF	Sisath Singsavanh	10 December 1971 (aged 27)		(Laos)
11	MF	Sithiphong Sayamounkhoun	4 August 1980 (aged 18)		(Laos)
12	DF	Phouvong Samounty	18 June 1980 (aged 19)		(Laos)
13	FW	Keolakhone Chinniphone	10 January 1970 (aged 29)		(Laos)
14	DF	Vilayphone Xayavong	4 September 1973 (aged 25)		(Laos)
15	MF	Kholadeth Phonephachanh	20 October 1980 (aged 18)		(Laos)
16	FW	Soubinh Keophet	20 January 1981 (aged 18)		(Laos)
17	FW	Mixay Souksavat	3 October 1970 (aged 28)		(Laos)
18	GK	Somsack Douangdala	24 April 1980 (aged 19)		(Laos)

=== Myanmar ===
Coach:

No.	Pos.	Player	Date of birth (age)	Caps	Club
1	GK	Aung Aung Oo	8 June 1982 (aged 17)		(Myanmar) Finance and Revenue FC
2	DF	Min Thu	27 July 1979 (aged 20)		(Myanmar)
3	FW	Soe Myat Min	19 July 1982 (aged 17)		(Myanmar) Finance and Revenue FC
4	DF	Soe Naing	10 May 1973 (aged 26)		(Myanmar)
5	DF	Thet Naing Soe	4 July 1982 (aged 17)		(Myanmar) Yangon City Development Committee
6	MF	Tin Myint Aung	25 March 1967 (aged 32)		(Myanmar) Finance and Revenue FC
7	FW	Zaw Htike	28 July 1983 (aged 16)		(Myanmar)
8	MF	Lwin Oo	8 March 1983 (aged 16)		(Myanmar)
9	FW	Myo Hlaing Win	24 May 1973 (aged 26)		(Myanmar) Finance and Revenue FC
10	FW	Win Htike	1 January 1982 (aged 17)		(Myanmar) Ministry of Home Affairs
11	MF	Aung Kyaw Moe	2 July 1982 (aged 17)		(Myanmar) Finance and Revenue FC
12	DF	Min Min Aung	8 January 1977 (aged 22)		(Myanmar) Finance and Revenue FC
13	MF	Min Zaw Oo	12 November 1976 (aged 22)		(Myanmar)
14	DF	Zaw Lin Tun	20 October 1982 (aged 16)		(Myanmar)
15	FW	Aung Kyaw Myint	29 September 1982 (aged 16)		(Myanmar)
16	MF	Nay Thu Hlaing	1 December 1982 (aged 16)		(Myanmar)
17	MF	Aung Soe Moe	10 June 1982 (aged 17)		(Myanmar)
18	GK	Zaw Myo Latt	3 July 1979 (aged 20)		(Myanmar)
19	DF	Maung Gyi	1 August 1970 (aged 28)		(Myanmar)
20		Win Min Oo			(Myanmar)
21	FW	Aung Khine	28 August 1973 (aged 25)		(Myanmar)
22		Kyaw Kyaw Tun			(Myanmar)

=== Philippines ===
Coach:

No.	Pos.	Player	Date of birth (age)	Caps	Club
1	GK	Melo Sabacan	5 October 1969 (aged 29)		
2	DF	Diobe Arellano			
4	DF	Loreto Kalalang	24 August 1974 (aged 24)		(Philippines) Philippine Navy F.C.
5	DF	Florante Altivo	11 July 1971 (aged 28)		
6	DF	Luisito Bagaygay Brillantes	7 March 1976 (aged 23)		
7	DF	Nestorio Margarse	3 May 1976 (aged 23)		
8	MF	Norman Somoza			
9	MF	Marlon Piñero	10 January 1972 (aged 27)		
10	FW	Alfredo Razon Gonzalez	1 October 1978 (aged 20)		(Philippines) Portland Pilots
11	FW	Yanti Barsales	6 February 1973 (aged 26)		(Philippines) Philippine Air Force
12	DF	Alvin Rafael Ocampo	5 August 1977 (aged 21)		
13	DF	Wilson dela Cruz	18 May 1979 (aged 20)		
14	FW	Jimmy Doña	10 May 1978 (aged 21)		
15	MF	Norman Fegidero	28 January 1970 (aged 29)		
16	MF	Leigh Gunn	24 December 1980 (aged 18)		(Australia) Bonnyrigg White Eagles
17	MF	Troy Fegidero	27 October 1975 (aged 23)		
18	GK	Edmundo Mercado	7 June 1974 (aged 25)		(Philippines) Philippine Air Force F.C.
20	FW	Richard Leyble	4 December 1971 (aged 27)		

=== Thailand ===
Coach: (England) Peter Withe

No.	Pos.	Player	Date of birth (age)	Caps	Club
1	GK	Chaiyong Khumpiam	29 August 1965 (aged 33)		(Thailand) Police United
2	DF	Kritsada Piandit	2 December 1971 (aged 27)		(Thailand) TOT S.C.
4	DF	Pattanapong Sripramote	3 February 1974 (aged 25)		(Thailand) Rajpracha
5	DF	Choketawee Promrut	16 March 1975 (aged 24)		(Thailand) Thai Farmers Bank F.C.
6	MF	Anuruck Srikerd	15 January 1975 (aged 24)		(Thailand) BEC Tero Sasana
7	DF	Chukiat Noosarung	25 July 1971 (aged 28)		(Thailand) Rajpracha
10	MF	Tawan Sripan	13 December 1971 (aged 27)		(Singapore) Sembawang Rangers
11	MF	Thawatchai Damrong-Ongtrakul	25 July 1974 (aged 25)		(Singapore) Sembawang Rangers
12	MF	Surachai Jaturapattarapong	20 November 1969 (aged 29)		(Thailand) RBAC
13	FW	Kiatisuk Senamuang	11 August 1973 (aged 25)		(England) Huddersfield Town
14	FW	Worrawoot Srimaka	8 December 1971 (aged 27)		(Thailand) BEC Tero Sasana
15	MF	Thongchai Akkarapong	10 July 1977 (aged 22)		(Thailand) Sinthana
16	DF	Surachai Jirasirichote	13 October 1970 (aged 28)		(Thailand) Sinthana
17	MF	Dusit Chalermsan	22 April 1970 (aged 29)		(India) Mohun Bagan AC
20	FW	Sakesan Pituratana	2 January 1976 (aged 23)		(Thailand) Sinthana
22	GK	Wirat Wangchan	25 February 1976 (aged 23)		(Thailand) Sinthana
23	FW	Jatupong Thongsukh	12 January 1976 (aged 23)		(Thailand) Raj-Vithi
25	DF	Thanunchai Baribarn	3 October 1972 (aged 26)		(Thailand) Sinthana

=== Vietnam ===
Coach: (Austria) Alfred Riedl

No.	Pos.	Player	Date of birth (age)	Caps	Club
1	GK	Trần Tiến Anh	12 August 1972 (aged 26)		(Vietnam) Thể Công
2	DF	Mai Tiến Dũng	1 July 1974 (aged 25)		
3	DF	Nguyễn Thiện Quang	15 March 1970 (aged 29)		(Vietnam) Ho Chi Minh City Police F.C.
4	DF	Nguyễn Phi Hùng	10 December 1974 (aged 24)		(Vietnam) Sông Lam Nghệ An
5	DF	Đỗ Mạnh Dũng	18 February 1970 (aged 29)		(Vietnam) Thể Công
6	DF	Nguyễn Đức Thắng	28 May 1976 (aged 23)		(Vietnam) Thể Công
7	DF	Đỗ Văn Khải	1 April 1974 (aged 25)		(Vietnam) Hai Quan FC
8	MF	Nguyễn Hồng Sơn	9 October 1970 (aged 28)		(Vietnam) Thể Công
9	FW	Văn Sỹ Hùng	1 September 1970 (aged 28)		(Vietnam) Sông Lam Nghệ An
10	FW	Lê Huỳnh Đức	20 April 1972 (aged 27)		(Vietnam) Ho Chi Minh City Police F.C.
11	MF	Nguyẽn Văn Sỹ	21 November 1971 (aged 27)		(Vietnam) Nam Định
12	DF	Phạm Như Thuần	22 October 1975 (aged 23)		(Vietnam) Thể Công
16	GK	Trần Minh Quang	19 April 1973 (aged 26)		(Vietnam) Bình Định
17	MF	Triệu Quang Hà	3 September 1975 (aged 23)		(Vietnam) Thể Công
18	MF	Nguyễn Liêm Thanh	5 June 1972 (aged 27)		
20	DF	Trần Công Minh	1 September 1970 (aged 28)		(Vietnam) Đồng Tháp F.C.
19	MF	Trương Việt Hoàng	9 December 1975 (aged 23)		(Vietnam) Thể Công
21	FW	Đặng Phương Nam	15 December 1976 (aged 22)		(Vietnam) Thể Công

== Group B ==
=== Brunei ===
Coach: (England) Mick Jones

No.	Pos.	Player	Date of birth (age)	Caps	Club
1	GK	Jefry Mohammad	13 June 1967 (aged 32)		Brunei Team
2	DF	Abang Norsillmy Abang Haji Taha	11 August 1978 (aged 20)		Brunei Team
3	MF	Rosli Hj Liman	1 January 1969 (aged 30)		Brunei Team
4	DF	Sabtu Lupat	2 March 1980 (aged 19)		Brunei Team
5	DF	Shahrul Rizal Haji Abd Rahman			
6	DF	Ak. Sallehuddin Pg Haji Damit	5 November 1973 (aged 25)		Brunei Team
7	MF	Sharimin Hairul Hj Sharbini			
8	FW	Fadlin Galawat	5 November 1978 (aged 20)		Brunei Team
9	FW	Radiman Abdul Rahman	2 August 1975 (aged 23)		Brunei Team
10	FW	Riwandi Wahit	6 March 1981 (aged 18)		Brunei Team
11	MF	Azamannuddin Haji Gillen			
12	FW	Mohd Rosanan Abdullah Samak	18 July 1965 (aged 34)		Brunei Team
13	DF	Haji Rosaidi Hj Mohd Kamis	28 November 1971 (aged 27)		Brunei Team
14	MF	Mohd Ali Haji Momin	6 February 1973 (aged 26)		Brunei Team
15	FW	Mohd Said Abdullah Tujoh	20 September 1966 (aged 32)		Brunei Team
16	FW	Moksen Mohammad	1 January 1971 (aged 28)		Brunei Team
17	MF	Irwan Mohammad	13 January 1975 (aged 24)		Brunei Team
18	GK	Ibrahim Haji Abu Bakar	30 August 1959 (aged 39)		Brunei Team

=== Cambodia ===
Coach:

No.	Pos.	Player	Date of birth (age)	Caps	Club
1	GK	Soun Dara	5 October 1974 (aged 24)		
2	DF	Soeur Chanveasna	10 November 1978 (aged 20)		
3	DF	Peas Sothy	15 December 1979 (aged 19)		
4	DF	Chea Sameth	11 April 1972 (aged 27)		
5	MF	Hem Samchay	6 June 1967 (aged 32)		
6	MF	Ung Kanyanith	12 December 1982 (aged 16)		
7	DF	Oum Sophanarith	3 December 1972 (aged 26)		
8	MF	Ieng Saknida	17 March 1980 (aged 19)		
9	FW	Hok Sochetra	27 July 1974 (aged 25)		
10	MF	Nuth Sony			
11	MF	Prak Sovannara	7 November 1972 (aged 26)		
12	DF	Choun Maline	15 July 1970 (aged 29)		
13	MF	Kao Nisai	15 April 1980 (aged 19)		
14		Im Sovatana			
15	DF	Pros Him	7 August 1976 (aged 22)		
16	FW	Chan Arunreath	1 July 1973 (aged 26)		
17	MF	Prak Vuthy	5 August 1970 (aged 28)		
18	GK	Ouk Chamrong	15 April 1969 (aged 30)		
19	FW	Thon Vuthy	13 June 1968 (aged 31)		
20	DF	Kim Chanbunrith	13 March 1979 (aged 20)		(Cambodia) Nagaworld FC
21	MF	Rith Dika	16 April 1982 (aged 17)		

=== Indonesia ===
Coach: (Germany) Bernhard Schumm

No.	Pos.	Player	Date of birth (age)	Caps	Club
1	GK	Hendro Kartiko	24 April 1973 (aged 26)		(Indonesia) Persebaya Surabaya
2	DF	Anang Ma'ruf	18 May 1976 (aged 23)		(Indonesia) Persebaya Surabaya
3	DF	Aji Santoso	6 April 1970 (aged 29)		(Indonesia) Persebaya Surabaya
4	DF	Agung Setyabudi	2 November 1972 (aged 26)		(Indonesia) PSIS Semarang
5	DF	Bejo Sugiantoro	2 April 1977 (aged 22)		(Indonesia) Persebaya Surabaya
6	DF	Eko Purdjianto	1 February 1976 (aged 23)		(Indonesia) Pelita Jaya
7	FW	Widodo C Putro	8 November 1970 (aged 28)		(Indonesia) Persija Jakarta
8	MF	Ali Sunan	1 November 1970 (aged 28)		(Indonesia) PSIS Semarang
9	MF	Uston Nawawi	6 September 1977 (aged 21)		(Indonesia) Persebaya Surabaya
10	FW	Kurniawan Dwi Yulianto	13 July 1976 (aged 23)		(Indonesia) Pelita Jaya
11	MF	Bima Sakti	23 January 1976 (aged 23)		(Indonesia) Pelita Jaya
12	DF	Slamet Riyadi	15 November 1981 (aged 17)		(Indonesia) PSMS Medan
13	MF	Eri Irianto	12 January 1974 (aged 25)		(Indonesia) Persebaya Surabaya
14	MF	Haryanto Prasetyo	3 April 1978 (aged 21)		(Indonesia) Persebaya Surabaya
15	DF	Ardi Warsidi	22 August 1979 (aged 19)		(Indonesia) Persita Tangerang
16	MF	Andrian Mardiansyah	14 November 1978 (aged 20)		(Indonesia) Persikota Tangerang
19	DF	Nur'alim	27 December 1973 (aged 25)		(Indonesia) Persija Jakarta
20	FW	Bambang Pamungkas	10 June 1980 (aged 19)		(Indonesia) Persija Jakarta
21	FW	Rochy Putiray	26 June 1970 (aged 29)		(Indonesia) Persijatim
23	GK	I. Komang Putra Adnyana	5 June 1972 (aged 27)		(Indonesia) PSIS Semarang

=== Malaysia ===
Coach: Abdul Rahman Ibrahim

No.	Pos.	Player	Date of birth (age)	Caps	Club
1	GK	Azmin Azram Abdul Aziz	1 February 1974 (aged 25)		(Malaysia) Negeri Sembilan FA
2	DF	Abdul Ghani Malik	25 May 1974 (aged 25)		(Malaysia) Terengganu FA
3	MF	Shamsul Amri Abu Bakar	10 September 1975 (aged 23)		(Malaysia) Selangor FA
4	DF	Rajanikandh Batumalai	2 October 1974 (aged 24)		
5	DF	Khairul Anuar Baharom	26 April 1974 (aged 25)		(Malaysia) Perak FA
6	DF	Thinagaran Vijayan			
7	MF	Wan Rohaimi Wan Ismail	19 May 1976 (aged 23)		(Malaysia) Pahang FA
9	FW	Rusdi Suparman	27 January 1973 (aged 26)		(Malaysia) Selangor FA
10	FW	Muhamad Khalid Jamlus	23 February 1977 (aged 22)		(Malaysia) Perak FA
11	DF	Mohd Nazri Yunos	28 December 1972 (aged 26)		(Malaysia) Sarawak FA
12	FW	Azizul Kamaluddin	1 August 1972 (aged 26)		(Malaysia) Pahang FA
14	DF	Asmawi Bakiri	10 September 1974 (aged 24)		(Malaysia) Selangor FA
15	MF	Ahmad Shaharuddin Rosdi	22 May 1975 (aged 24)		(Malaysia) Pahang FA
17	DF	Mohanadasan Karunakaran	20 July 1978 (aged 21)		(Malaysia) Kuala Lumpur FA
18	MF	Yap Wai Loon			(Malaysia) Kuala Lumpur FA
19	MF	Tengku Hazman Raja Hassan	6 March 1977 (aged 22)		(Malaysia) Perlis FA
20	MF	Ahmad Shahrul Azhar Sofian	24 October 1974 (aged 24)		(Malaysia) Negeri Sembilan FA
21	GK	Veerappan Murugan	3 April 1965 (aged 34)		

=== Singapore ===
Coach: Vincent Subramaniam

No.	Pos.	Player	Date of birth (age)	Caps	Club
1	GK	Mohd Rezal Hassan	14 February 1974 (aged 25)		Singapore Armed Forces
2	DF	Robin Pradhan Chitrakar	2 October 1976 (aged 22)		(Singapore) Geylang United
3	MF	Mohd Rafi Mohd Ali	11 December 1972 (aged 26)		Singapore Armed Forces
4	DF	Razif Mahamud	11 October 1978 (aged 20)		
5	DF	Aide Iskandar Sahak	28 May 1975 (aged 24)		(Singapore) Police United
6	DF	Subramani Shunmugham	5 August 1972 (aged 26)		(Singapore) Police United
7	MF	Samawira Basri	2 September 1972 (aged 26)		(Singapore) Tiong Bahru United
9	FW	Ahmad Latiff Khamarudin	29 May 1979 (aged 20)		(Singapore) Geylang United
10	FW	Indra Sahdan Daud	5 March 1979 (aged 20)		(Singapore) Geylang United
11	MF	Basri Halis	24 November 1975 (aged 23)		(Singapore) Tanjong Pagar United
12	DF	Zulkarnaen Zainal	1 October 1973 (aged 25)		(Singapore) Geylang United
14	MF	Gusta Guzarishah Miramshah	29 April 1976 (aged 23)		
15	MF	Mohd Nazri Nasir	17 January 1971 (aged 28)		Singapore Armed Forces
16	MF	Abdul Kadir Yahya	15 February 1968 (aged 31)		(Singapore) Geylang United
18	DF	Tan Kim Leng	5 September 1977 (aged 21)		
19	FW	Mohd Noor Mohd Ali	16 May 1975 (aged 24)		(Singapore) Tampines Rovers
20	MF	Mohd Azhar Salleh	29 January 1975 (aged 24)		
21	DF	Aziz Salim	8 August 1975 (aged 23)		
22	GK	Noorisham Zainon	14 May 1973 (aged 26)		
	MF	Hafizat Jauharmi	18 February 1976 (aged 23)		
	DF	Lim Tong Hai	14 May 1969 (aged 30)		(Singapore) Tanjong Pagar United
	MF	Hasrin Jailani	22 November 1975 (aged 23)		(Singapore) Geylang United
