= 2021–22 in Thai football =

Football in Thailand
- Season: 2021–22

Men's football
- Thai League 1: Buriram United
- Thai League 2: Lamphun Warriors
- Thai League 3: Uthai Thani
- Thai FA Cup: Buriram United
- Thai League Cup: Buriram United
- Thailand Champions Cup: BG Pathum United

The 2021–22 season is the 106th season of competitive association football in Thailand.

== National teams ==
=== Thailand national football team ===
==== Results and fixtures ====
===== 2022 FIFA World Cup qualification =====
====== Group G ======
3 June 2021 2022 World Cup qualification	Thailand	2-2	Indonesia	Dubai, United Arab Emirates
20:45 UTC+4	Narubadin 5'; Adisak 50'	Report (FIFA); Report (AFC)	Agung 39'; Dimas 60'	Stadium: Al Maktoum Stadium; Attendance: 0 Referee: Ammar Mahfoodh (Bahrain)

7 June 2021 2022 World Cup qualification	United Arab Emirates	3-1	Thailand	Dubai, United Arab Emirates
20:45 UTC+4	Caio 14'; Lima 33'; Jumaa 90+4'	Report (FIFA); Report (AFC)	Suphanat 54'	Stadium: Zabeel Stadium; Attendance: 980; Referee: Ryuji Sato (Japan)

15 June 2021 2022 World Cup qualification	Thailand	0-1	Malaysia	Dubai, United Arab Emirates
20:45 UTC+4		Report (FIFA); Report (AFC)	Safawi 52' (pen.)	Stadium: Al Maktoum Stadium; Attendance: 142; Referee: Mohammed Al-Hoish (Saudi Arabia)

===== 2020 AFF Championship =====
====== Group A ======
Pos	Team	Pld	W	D	L	GF	GA	GD	Pts	Qualification
1	Thailand	4	4	0	0	10	1	+9	12	Advance to semi-finals
2	Singapore (H)	4	3	0	1	7	3	+4	9	Advance to semi-finals
3	Philippines	4	2	0	2	12	6	+6	6	
4	Myanmar	4	1	0	3	4	10	−6	3	
5	Timor-Leste	4	0	0	4	0	13	−13	0	Play qualification for the next edition

Source: AFF
(H) Hosts

5 December 2021 1	Timor-Leste	0-2	Thailand	Kallang, Singapore
17:30 UTC+8		Report	Pathompol 51'; Supachok 81'	Stadium: National Stadium; Attendance: 2,432; Referee: Qasim Al-Hatmi (Oman)

11 December 2021 2	Thailand	4-0	Myanmar	Kallang, Singapore
20:30 UTC+8	Teerasil 23' 53' (pen.); Worachit 78'; Supachok 90+2'	Report		Stadium: National Stadium; Attendance: 1,142; Referee: Shukri Hussain Al-Alhunfush (Saudi Arabia)

14 December 2021 3	Philippines	1-2	Thailand	Kallang, Singapore
17:30 UTC+8	Reichelt 57'	Report	Teerasil 26' 78' (pen.)	Stadium: National Stadium; Attendance: 2,559; Referee: Qasim Al-Hatmi (Oman)

18 December 2021 4	Thailand	2-0	Singapore	Kallang, Singapore
20:30 UTC+8	Elias 31'; Supachai 45+2'	Report		Stadium: National Stadium; Attendance: 9,540; Referee: Ahmad Yacoub Ibrahim (Jordan)

====== Semi-finals ======
23 December 2021 First leg	Vietnam	0-2	Thailand	Kallang, Singapore
20:30 UTC+8		Report	Chanathip 14' 23'	Stadium: National Stadium; Attendance: 7,355; Referee: Saoud Ali Al-Adba (Qatar)

26 December 2021 Second leg	Thailand	0-0	Vietnam	Kallang, Singapore
20:30 UTC+8		Report		Stadium: National Stadium; Attendance: 8,121; Referee: Ahmad Yacoub Ibrahim (Jordan)

====== Finals ======
29 December 2021 First leg	Indonesia	0-4	Thailand	Kallang, Singapore
20:30 UTC+8		Report	Songkrasin 2' 53'; Sarachat 67'; Phala 83'	Stadium: National Stadium; Referee: Shukri Al-Alhunfush (Saudi Arabia)

1 January 2022 Second leg	Thailand	2-2	Indonesia	Kallang, Singapore
20:30 UTC+8	Adisak 54'; Sarach 56'	Report	Kambuaya 7'; Egy 80'	Stadium: National Stadium; Referee: Ahmed Faisal Al-Ali (Jordan)

== AFC competitions ==
=== AFC Champions League ===
==== Group stage ====
===== Group F =====
Pos	Team	Pld	W	D	L	GF	GA	GD	Pts	Qualification	ULS	PAT	VIE	KAY
1	(South Korea) Ulsan Hyundai	6	6	0	0	13	1	+12	18	Advance to Round of 16	—	2–0	3–0	2–1
2	(Thailand) BG Pathum United (H)	6	4	0	2	10	6	+4	12	Advance to Round of 16	0–2	—	2–0	4–1
3	(Vietnam) Viettel	6	2	0	4	7	9	−2	6		0–1	1–3	—	1–0
4	(Philippines) Kaya–Iloilo	6	0	0	6	2	16	−14	0		0–3	0–1	0–5	—

Source: AFC
(H) Hosts

===== Group G =====
Pos	Team	Pld	W	D	L	GF	GA	GD	Pts	Qualification	NAG	POH	JOH	RAT
1	(Japan) Nagoya Grampus	6	5	1	0	14	2	+12	16	Advance to Round of 16	—	3–0	2–1	3–0
2	(South Korea) Pohang Steelers	6	3	2	1	9	5	+4	11	Advance to Round of 16	1–1	—	4–1	2–0
3	(Malaysia) Johor Darul Ta'zim	6	1	1	4	3	9	−6	4		0–1	0–2	—	0–0
4	(Thailand) Ratchaburi Mitr Phol (H)	6	0	2	4	0	10	−10	2		0–4	0–0	0–1	—

Source: AFC
(H) Hosts

===== Group H =====
Pos	Team	Pld	W	D	L	GF	GA	GD	Pts	Qualification	JEO	GAM	CHI	TAM
1	(South Korea) Jeonbuk Hyundai Motors	6	5	1	0	22	5	+17	16	Advance to Round of 16	—	2–1	2–1	9–0
2	(Japan) Gamba Osaka	6	2	3	1	15	7	+8	9		2–2	—	1–1	8–1
3	(Thailand) Chiangrai United	6	2	2	2	8	7	+1	8		1–3	1–1	—	1–0
4	(Singapore) Tampines Rovers	6	0	0	6	1	27	−26	0		0–4	0–2	0–3	—

Source: AFC

===== Group J =====
Pos	Team	Pld	W	D	L	GF	GA	GD	Pts	Qualification	CER	KIT	POR	GZH
1	(Japan) Cerezo Osaka	6	4	2	0	13	2	+11	14	Advance to Round of 16	—	2–1	1–1	5–0
2	(Hong Kong) Kitchee	6	3	2	1	6	3	+3	11		0–0	—	2–0	1–0
3	(Thailand) Port (H)	6	2	2	2	10	8	+2	8		0–3	1–1	—	3–0
4	(China) Guangzhou	6	0	0	6	1	17	−16	0		0–2	0–1	1–5	—

Source: AFC
(H) Hosts

==== Round of 16 ====
15 September 2021 Round of 16	Jeonbuk Hyundai Motors (South Korea)	1–1 (a.e.t.) (4–2 p)	(Thailand) BG Pathum United	Jeonju World Cup Stadium, Jeonju
17:30 UTC+9	Gustavo 45+2'	Report	Teerasil 76'	Attendance: 0 Referee: Mooud Bonyadifar (Iran)
	Penalties
	Gustavo (penalty scored); Kim Bo-kyung (penalty scored); Iljutcenko (penalty scored); Kim Jin-su (penalty scored)		(penalty scored) Jakkapan; (penalty scored) Chatmongkol; (penalty missed) Sarach; (penalty missed) Chitchanok

== Thai competitions ==
League	Promoted to league	Relegated from league	Expelled or Dissolved
Thai League 1	Nongbua Pitchaya; Chiangmai United; Khon Kaen United	Sukhothai; Trat; Rayong	None
Thai League 2	Lamphun Warriors; Muangkan United; Rajpracha	Samut Sakhon; Sisaket; Uthai Thani	None
Thai League 3	None	None	None

=== Thai League 1 ===
Pos	Team	Pld	W	D	L	GF	GA	GD	Pts	Qualification
1	Buriram United (C, Q)	30	19	5	6	48	19	+29	62	Qualification for 2023–24 AFC Champions League group stage
2	BG Pathum United (Q)	30	17	9	4	52	27	+25	60	Qualification for 2023–24 AFC Champions League qualifying play-offs
3	Bangkok United	30	15	8	7	53	30	+23	53	
4	Muangthong United	30	13	10	7	46	35	+11	49	
5	Chiangrai United	30	13	8	9	33	35	−2	47	
6	Nongbua Pitchaya	30	13	8	9	42	35	+7	47	
7	Chonburi	30	12	8	10	50	40	+10	44	
8	Port	30	11	6	13	41	37	+4	39	
9	Nakhon Ratchasima	30	10	7	13	33	47	−14	37	
10	Khonkaen United	30	10	7	13	30	43	−13	37	
11	Police Tero	30	8	13	9	33	39	−6	37	
12	Ratchaburi Mitr Phol	30	9	9	12	32	36	−4	36	
13	PT Prachuap	30	8	7	15	30	45	−15	31	
14	Suphanburi (R)	30	8	6	16	35	49	−14	30	Relegation to Thai League 2
15	Samut Prakan City (R)	30	6	10	14	29	42	−13	28	Relegation to Thai League 2
16	Chiangmai United (R)	30	4	7	19	28	56	−28	19	Relegation to Thai League 2

Updated to match(es) played on 4 May 2022. Source: Thai League
Rules for classification: 1) Points; 2) Head-to-head points; 3) Head-to-head goals difference; 4) Head-to-head goals scored; 5) Overall goals difference; 6) Overall goals scored; 7) Fair play points; 8) Play-off without extra time;).
(C) Champions; (Q) Qualified for the phase indicated; (R) Relegated

=== Thai League 2 ===
Pos	Team	Pld	W	D	L	GF	GA	GD	Pts	Qualification or relegation
1	Lamphun Warriors (C, P)	34	22	8	4	66	30	+36	74	Promotion to 2022–23 Thai League 1
2	Sukhothai (P)	34	22	7	5	78	44	+34	73	Promotion to 2022–23 Thai League 1
3	Trat	34	20	8	6	55	33	+22	68	Qualification for promotion play-offs
4	Lampang (O, P)	34	15	12	7	67	38	+29	57 (Note: The head-to-head record was a tie, Lampang ahead on overall goals difference.)	Qualification for promotion play-offs
5	Chainat Hornbill	34	15	12	7	58	46	+12	57	Qualification for promotion play-offs
6	Phrae United	34	14	12	8	51	35	+16	54	Qualification for promotion play-offs
7	Muangkan United (R)	34	14	10	10	70	62	+8	52	Relegation to 2023 Thailand Amateur League (Note: Muangkan United administratively relegated to 2023 Thailand Amateur League by FA Thailand decision because of the failure about club licensing.)
8	Udon Thani	34	13	8	13	53	58	−5	47	
9	Rayong	34	13	7	14	45	41	+4	46	
10	Nakhon Pathom United	34	10	12	12	42	47	−5	42	
11	Ayutthaya United	34	10	11	13	40	50	−10	41 (Note: Ayutthaya United ahead on head-to-head points record; Ayutthaya United 4 pts, Ranong United 1 pt.)	
12	Ranong United	34	10	11	13	35	45	−10	41	
13	Kasetsart	34	9	12	13	32	47	−15	39	
14	Chiangmai	34	10	8	16	39	55	−16	38	
15	Customs Ladkrabang United	34	9	8	17	44	63	−19	35	
16	Rajpracha	34	7	12	15	34	44	−10	33	
17	Khon Kaen (R)	34	5	9	20	32	60	−28	24	Relegation to 2022–23 Thai League 3
18	Navy (R)	34	2	5	27	28	71	−43	11	Relegation to 2022–23 Thai League 3

Source: Thai League
Rules for classification: 1) Points; 2) Head-to-head points; 3) Head-to-head goal difference; 4) Head-to-head goal scored; 5) Overall goal difference; 6) Overall goal scored; 7) Fair play points; 8) Play-off without extra time).
(C) Champions; (O) Play-off winners; (P) Promoted; (R) Relegated

=== Cup competitions ===
==== Thailand Champions Cup ====
1 September 2021	BG Pathum United	1-0	Chiangrai United	Chiangmai
18:00 (UTC+7)	Ryo Matsumura 87'	Report		Stadium: 700th Anniversary of Chiangmai Stadium; Referee: Wiwat Jumpaoon (Thailand)

== Managerial changes ==
This is a list of changes of managers within Thai league football:

Team	Outgoing manager	Manner of departure	Date of departure	Position in table	Incoming manager	Date of appointment
Rayong	(Japan) Masami Taki	Sacked	29 March 2021	Pre-season	(Japan) Sugao Kambe	17 April 2021
PT Prachuap	(Thailand) Thawatchai Damrong-Ongtrakul	Mutual Consent	30 March 2021	Pre-season	(Japan) Masami Taki	30 March 2021
Sukhothai	(Thailand) Surapong Kongthep	Resigned	31 March 2021	Pre-season	(Germany) Dennis Amato	8 May 2021
Customs United	(Thailand) Santi Songte	Resigned	20 April 2021	Pre-season	(Switzerland) Damian Bellón	20 April 2021
Ranong United	(Switzerland) Damian Bellón	Signed by Customs United	20 April 2021	Pre-season	(Brazil) Reuther Moreira	28 April 2021
Chiangmai United	(Germany) Dennis Amato	Resigned	24 April 2021	Pre-season	(Thailand) Surapong Kongthep	15 June 2021
Nongbua Pitchaya	(Thailand) Somchai Chuayboonchum	Sacked	28 April 2021	Pre-season	(Thailand) Thawatchai Damrong-Ongtrakul	4 May 2021
Navy	(Thailand) Chalermwoot Sa-ngapol	Resigned	28 April 2021	Pre-season	(Japan) Mitsuo Kato	28 April 2021
Rajpracha	(Thailand) Jakkrit Bunkham	Mutual Consent	28 April 2021	Pre-season	(Thailand) Dusit Chalermsan	29 April 2021
BG Pathum United	(Thailand) Dusit Chalermsan	Signed by Rajpracha	29 April 2021	Pre-season	(Australia) Aurelio Vidmar	30 April 2021
Chiangmai	(Thailand) Amnaj Kaewkiew	Redesignated	6 May 2021	Pre-season	(Thailand) Pairoj Borwonwatanadilok	6 May 2021
Khonkaen United	(Thailand) Patipat Robroo	Redesignated	10 May 2021	Pre-season	(Brazil) Carlos Eduardo Parreira	10 May 2021
Lampang	(Thailand) Weerayut Binebdullohman	Resigned	2 June 2021	Pre-season	(Thailand) Sukrit Yothee	3 June 2021
Udon Thani	(Thailand) Sirisak Yodyardthai	End of contract	8 June 2021	Pre-season	(Brazil) Fernando Sales	9 June 2021
Khon Kaen	(Thailand) Somchai Makmool	Resigned	10 July 2021	Pre-season	(Japan) Masayuki Miura	
Trat	(Thailand) Phayong Khunnaen	Mutual Consent	13 June 2021	Pre-season	(Thailand) Somchai Chuayboonchum	14 June 2021
Port	(Thailand) Sarawut Treephan	Redesignated	20 July 2021	Pre-season	(Thailand) Dusit Chalermsan	20 July 2021
Rajpracha	(Thailand) Dusit Chalermsan	Signed by Port	20 July 2021	Pre-season	(Thailand) Tanongsak Prajakkata	27 September 2021
Udon Thani	(Brazil) Fernando Sales	End of contract		Pre-season	(Argentina) Daniel Blanco	23 August 2021
Muangkan United	(Thailand) Jadet Meelarp	Mutual Consent	29 September 2021	13th	(Thailand) Somchai Makmool	19 October 2021
Navy	(Japan) Mitsuo Kato	Mutual Consent	1 October 2021	18th	(Thailand) Chalermwoot Sa-ngapol	1 October 2021
Chiangmai United	(Thailand) Surapong Kongthep	Redesignated	10 October 2021	15th	(Thailand) Surachai Jirasirichote (caretaker)	11 October 2021
Mahasarakham	(Thailand) Keeratikorn Janklan	Mutual Consent	18 October 2021	12th	(Thailand) Jakarat Tonhongsa	21 October 2021
Udon Thani	(Argentina) Daniel Blanco	Resigned	22 October 2021	4th	(Germany) Hagen Hübner (caretaker)	23 October 2021
Chiangmai United	(Thailand) Surachai Jirasirichote	End of caretaker spell	26 October 2021	16th	(Brazil) Ailton dos Santos Silva	27 October 2021
Pattaya Dolphins United	(Thailand) Sarawut Janthapan	Mutual Consent	30 October 2021	1st	(Thailand) Sirisak Yodyardthai	1 November 2021
Udon Thani	(Germany) Hagen Hübner	End of caretaker spell	2 November 2021		(Germany) Jörg Steinebrunner	17 December 2021
Samutsongkhram	(Thailand) Panupong Chimpook	Resigned	3 November 2021	11th	(Thailand) Chonlathit Krutthiang	4 November 2021
Ubon Kruanapat	(Thailand) Tana Chanabut	Sacked	7 November 2021	7th	(Thailand) Jetsadakorn Hemdaeng	30 November 2021
Lamphun Warriors	(Thailand) Jongsarit Wutchuay	Redesignated	8 November 2021	6th	(Brazil) Wanderley Junior	11 November 2021
Phrae United	(Thailand) Arnon Bundasak	Mutual Consent	8 November 2021	4th	(Thailand) Pichitphong Choeichiu (caretaker)	8 November 2021
Port	(Thailand) Dusit Chalermsan	Resigned	11 November 2021	8th	(Thailand) Sarawut Treephan	11 November 2021
STK Muangnont	(Thailand) Ittiphon Pimwong	Redesignated	11 November 2021	6th	(Thailand) Jatupong Thongsukh	11 November 2021
BG Pathum United	(Australia) Aurelio Vidmar	Resigned	14 November 2021	3rd	(Thailand) Dusit Chalermsan	14 November 2021
PT Prachuap	(Japan) Masami Taki	Sacked	15 November 2021	14th	(Thailand) Issara Sritaro	15 November 2021
Songkhla	(Japan) Daiki Higuchi	Mutual Consent	15 November 2021	4th		
Customs United	(Switzerland) Damian Bellón	Sacked	22 November 2021	10th	(Thailand) Varit Boonsripittayanon (caretaker)	22 November 2021
Samut Prakan City	(Japan) Masatada Ishii	End of contract	27 November 2021	13th	(Japan) Yasushi Yoshida	11 December 2021
Khon Kaen	(Japan) Masayuki Miura	Signed by Buriram United academy	28 November 2021	15th	(Argentina) Daniel Blanco	30 November 2021
Buriram United	(Brazil) Alexandre Gama	Mutual Consent	28 November 2021	1st	(Japan) Masatada Ishii	1 December 2021
Trang	(Thailand) Itthiphol Nonsiri	Resigned	29 November 2021	5th		
Phitsanulok	(Thailand) Chamnan Phraekhunthot	Sacked		2nd	(Switzerland) Damian Bellón	2 December 2021
Rajpracha	(Thailand) Tanongsak Prajakkata	Mutual Consent	7 December 2021	17th	(Thailand) Aktaporn Chalitaporn	7 December 2021
Nakhon Si United	(Thailand) Aktaporn Chalitaporn	Signed by Rajpracha	7 December 2021	1st		
Kanchanaburi	(Thailand) Pannarai Pansiri	Mutual Consent	8 December 2021	2nd		
Uttaradit					(Thailand) Chamnan Phraekhunthot	8 December 2021
STK Muangnont	(Thailand) Jatupong Thongsukh	Mutual Consent	10 December 2021	8th	(Thailand) Ekalak Thong-am	10 December 2021
Chainat United	(Thailand) Somdet Hitates	Sacked	10 December 2021	9th		
Rayong	(Japan) Sugao Kambe	Sacked	10 December 2021	13th	(Japan) Masami Taki	21 December 2021
