= Football at the 1999 SEA Games =

1999 SEA Games Football
Tournament details
- Host country: Brunei
- Dates: 30 July – 14 August
- Teams: 10
- Venue(s): 3 (in 1 host city)

Final positions
- Champions: Thailand (9th title)
- Runners-up: Vietnam
- Third place: Indonesia
- Fourth place: Singapore

Tournament statistics
- Matches played: 24
- Goals scored: 87 (3.63 per match)
- Attendance: 57,800 (2,408 per match)
- Top scorer(s): (Thailand) Kiatisuk Senamuang (6 goals)

Football at the 1999 SEA Games took place in Brunei between 30 July and 14 August 1999. It was the last men's football tournament of the Southeast Asian Games to be played without an age limit.

== Venues ==
All venues located in the capital, Bandar Seri Begawan.

- Berakas Track and Field Complex – also known as Belapan
- Berakas Sports Complex
- Sultan Hassanal Bolkiah Stadium

== Group stage ==
=== Group A ===
Team	Pld	W	D	L	GF	GA	GD	Pts
Thailand	4	3	1	0	20	1	+19	10
Vietnam	4	3	1	0	13	0	+13	10
Myanmar	4	1	1	2	4	10	−6	4
Laos	4	1	1	2	4	15	−11	4
Philippines	4	0	0	4	3	18	−15	0

30 July 1999
16:00

Thailand	9–0	Philippines
Srikerd 6'; Senamuang 35' (pen.), 38', 65', 93'; Jaturapattarapong 46'; Pituratana 47'; Promrut 84'; Srimaka 89'	Report

Berakas Track and Field Complex, Bandar Seri Begawan
Attendance: 1,000
Referee: Zulkifle Haji Duraman (Brunei)
30 July 1999
16:00

Vietnam	9–0	Laos
Lê Huỳnh Đức 1', 3', 17', 27'; Văn Sỹ Hùng 60', 72', 79'; Triệu Quang Hà 76'; Luang-Amath 90' (o.g.)	Report

Berakas Sports Complex, Bandar Seri Begawan
Attendance: 1,000
Referee: Serang Muchilis (Indonesia)

1 August 1999
16:00

Laos	1–4	Thailand
Khenkittisack 90'	Report	Sripan 20'; Promrut 73'; Senamuang 74'; Pituratana 83'

Berakas Track and Field Complex, Bandar Seri Begawan
Attendance: 2,000
Referee: Mohammad Kadri (Malaysia)
1 August 1999
16:00

Myanmar	4–1	Philippines
Myo Hlaing Win 26', 41', 68'; Win Htaik 53'	Report	Piñero 18'

Berakas Sports Complex, Bandar Seri Begawan
Attendance: 2,000
Referee: Mohd Abdullah (Brunei)

3 August 1999
16:00

Myanmar	0–2	Vietnam
	Report	Trương Việt Hoàng 77'; Đặng Phương Nam 82'

Berakas Track and Field Complex, Bandar Seri Begawan
Attendance: 1,000
Referee: Zulkifle Haji Duraman (Brunei)
3 August 1999
16:00

Philippines	2–3	Laos
Fegidero 42'; Piñero 68'	Report	Thamavongsa 56'; Soubinh 57'; Luang-Amath 71'

Berakas Sports Complex, Bandar Seri Begawan
Attendance: 500
Referee: Serang Muchilis (Indonesia)

5 August 1999
16:00

Laos	0–0	Myanmar
	Report

Berakas Track and Field Complex, Bandar Seri Begawan
Attendance: 500
Referee: Serang Muchilis (Indonesia)
5 August 1999
16:00

Vietnam	0–0	Thailand
	Report

Berakas Sports Complex, Bandar Seri Begawan
Attendance: 7,000
Referee: Zulkifle Haji Duraman (Brunei)

8 August 1999
16:00

Philippines	0–2	Vietnam
	Report	Đặng Phương Nam 44', 49'

Berakas Track and Field Complex, Bandar Seri Begawan
Attendance: 500
Referee: Mohd Abdullah (Brunei)
8 August 1999
20:30

Thailand	7–0	Myanmar
Sripan 16'; Boriban 19'; Thongsukh 63', 83'; Pituratana 73', 77'; Senamuang 89'	Report

Berakas Sports Complex, Bandar Seri Begawan
Attendance: 5,000
Referee: Serang Muchilis (Indonesia)

=== Group B ===
Team	Pld	W	D	L	GF	GA	GD	Pts
Indonesia	4	3	1	0	11	1	+10	10
Singapore	4	3	1	0	8	3	+5	10
Malaysia	4	2	0	2	10	10	0	6
Brunei	4	0	1	3	4	11	−7	1
Cambodia	4	0	1	3	5	13	−8	1

31 July 1999
16:00

Indonesia	1–0	Cambodia
Mardiansyah 90'	Report

Berakas Track and Field Complex, Bandar Seri Begawan
Attendance: 2,000
Referee: Nguyễn Văn Mùi (Vietnam)
31 July 1999
16:00

Singapore	2–1	Malaysia
Nasir 59'; Noor Ali 86'	Report	Kamaluddin 87'

Berakas Sports Complex, Bandar Seri Begawan
Attendance: 2,000
Referee: Permpanich Pongsathorn (Thailand)

2 August 1999
16:00

Indonesia	6–0	Malaysia
Prasetyo 6'; Putiray 9', 84'; Bambang 51', 58'; Ali Sunan 82'	Report

Berakas Track and Field Complex, Bandar Seri Begawan
Attendance: 2,000
Referee: Permpanich Pongsathorn (Thailand)
2 August 1999
16:00

Brunei	3–3	Cambodia
Said Abdullah 22', 41'; Damit 67'	Report	Sophanarith 52'; Sochetra 78', 81'

Berakas Sports Complex, Bandar Seri Begawan
Attendance: 5,000
Referee: Nguyễn Văn Mùi (Vietnam)

4 August 1999
16:00

Brunei	1–3	Singapore
Kamis 88'	Report	Daud 9', 34'; Khamaruddin 78'

Berakas Track and Field Complex, Bandar Seri Begawan
Referee: Permpanich Pongsathorn (Thailand)
4 August 1999
16:00

Cambodia	2–7	Malaysia
Sochetra 17'; Arunreath 36'	Report	Azhar Sofian 8', 46', 89'; Ismail 22', 71'; Suparman 66', 81'

Berakas Sports Complex, Bandar Seri Begawan
Attendance: 1,000
Referee: Nguyễn Văn Mùi (Vietnam)

6 August 1999
16:00

Brunei	0–2	Malaysia
	Report	Bakiri 18'; Kamaluddin 85'

Berakas Track and Field Complex, Bandar Seri Begawan
Attendance: 3,000
Referee: Nguyễn Văn Mùi (Vietnam)
6 August 1999
16:00

Indonesia	1–1	Singapore
Bima 37' (pen.)	Report	Daud 89'

Berakas Sports Complex, Bandar Seri Begawan
Attendance: 2,000
Referee: Permpanich Pongsathorn (Thailand)

9 August 1999
16:00

Cambodia	0–2	Singapore
	Report	Zainal 32'; Nasir 80'

Berakas Track and Field Complex, Bandar Seri Begawan
Attendance: 300
Referee: Nguyễn Văn Mùi (Vietnam)
9 August 1999
20:00

Brunei	0–3	Indonesia
	Report	Uston 4'; Bima 39' (pen.); Mardiansyah 87'

Berakas Sports Complex, Bandar Seri Begawan
Attendance: 3,000
Referee: Mohammad Kadri (Malaysia)

== Knockout stage ==
Semi-finals
12 August
Thailand	2
Singapore	0
12 August
Indonesia	0
Vietnam	1

Final
14 August
Thailand	2
Vietnam	0
Third place
14 August
Indonesia (pen.)	0 (4)
Singapore	0 (2)

=== Semi-finals ===
12 August 1999
16:00

Thailand	2–0	Singapore
Sripan 21'; Damrong-Ongtrakul 75'	Report

Hassanal Bolkiah Stadium, Bandar Seri Begawan
Attendance: 8,000
Referee: Kwong Jong Cheol (Korea Republic)

12 August 1999
20:00

Indonesia	0–1	Vietnam
	Report	Nguyễn Hồng Sơn 70'

Hassanal Bolkiah Stadium, Bandar Seri Begawan
Attendance: 3,000
Referee: Sun Bao Jie (China)

=== Bronze medal match ===
14 August 1999
16:00

Indonesia	0–0 (a.e.t.)	Singapore
	Report
Penalties
Bima (penalty scored); Prasetyo (penalty scored); Sugiantoro (penalty scored); Widodo (penalty scored)	4–2	(penalty scored) Zainal; (penalty missed) Nasir; (penalty missed) Rafi Ali; (penalty scored) Salleh

Hassanal Bolkiah Stadium, Bandar Seri Begawan
Attendance: 3,000
Referee: Sun Bao Jie (China)

=== Gold medal match ===
14 August 1999
20:30

Thailand	2–0	Vietnam
Damrong-Ongtrakul 39'; Chalermsan 85'	Report 1 Report 2

Hassanal Bolkiah Stadium, Bandar Seri Begawan
Attendance: 3,000
Referee: Kwong Jong Cheol (Korea Republic)

== Winners ==
1999 SEA Games Men's Tournament

Thailand
Ninth title

== Medal winners ==
Gold	Silver	Bronze
Thailand	Vietnam	Indonesia
Wirat Wangchan; Choketawee Promrut; Chukiat Noosarung; Tananchai Boriban; Kritsada Piandit; Phathanapong Sripramote; Dusit Chalermsan; Thawatchai Damrong-Ongtrakul; Surachai Jaturapattarapong; Jatupong Thongsukh; Tawan Sripan; Kiatisuk Senamuang; Sakesan Pituratana; Anuruck Srikerd; Worrawoot Srimaka	Trần Minh Quang; Trần Tiến Anh; Mai Tiến Dũng; Nguyễn Thiện Quang; Nguyễn Phi Hùng; Đỗ Mạnh Dũng; Nguyễn Đức Thắng; Đỗ Khải; Nguyễn Hồng Sơn; Văn Sỹ Hùng; Lê Huỳnh Đức; Nguyễn Văn Sỹ; Phạm Như Thuần; Triệu Quang Hà; Nguyễn Liêm Thanh; Trương Việt Hoàng; Trần Công Minh; Đặng Phương Nam	GK Hendro Kartiko; GK I Komang Putra; DF Nuralim; DF Aji Santoso; DF Agung Setyabudi; DF Sugiantoro; DF Eko Purdjianto; MF Ali Sunan; MF Andrian Mardiansyah; MF Haryanto Prasetyo; MF Uston Nawawi; MF Bima Sakti; FW Widodo C Putro; FW Rochy Putiray; FW Bambang Pamungkas

== Goalscorers ==
6 goals

- (Thailand) Kiatisuk Senamuang

4 goals

- (Thailand) Sakesan Pituratana
- (Vietnam) Lê Huỳnh Đức
- (Vietnam) Đặng Phương Nam

3 goals

- (Cambodia) Hok Sochetra
- (Indonesia) Bima Sakti
- (Malaysia) Ahmad Shahrul Azhar Sofian
- (Myanmar) Myo Hlaing Win
- (Singapore) Indra Sahdan Daud
- (Thailand) Tawan Sripan
- (Vietnam) Văn Sỹ Hùng

2 goals

- (Brunei) Mohd Said Abdullah
- (Indonesia) Bambang Pamungkas
- (Indonesia) Rochi Putiray
- (Malaysia) Azizul Kamaluddin
- (Malaysia) Rusdi Suparman
- (Malaysia) Wan Rohaimi Wan Ismail
- (Philippines) Marlon Piñero
- (Singapore) Nazri Nasir
- (Thailand) Choketawee Promrut
- (Thailand) Jatupong Thongsukh
- (Thailand) Thawatchai Damrong-Ongtrakul

1 goal

- (Brunei) Sallehuddin Haji Damit
- (Brunei) Haji Rosaidi Kamis
- (Cambodia) Chan Arunreath
- (Cambodia) Oum Sophanarith
- (Indonesia) Ali Sunan
- (Indonesia) Andrian Mardiansyah
- (Indonesia) Harianto Prasetyo
- (Indonesia) Uston Nawawi
- (Laos) Bounlap Khenkittisack
- (Laos) Bounmy Thamavongsa
- (Laos) Chalan Louang-Amath
- (Laos) Soubinh Keophet
- (Malaysia) Asmawi Bakiri
- (Myanmar) Win Htaik
- (Philippines) Norman Fegidero
- (Singapore) Ahmad Latiff Khamaruddin
- (Singapore) Mohd Noor Ali
- (Singapore) Zulkarnaen Zainal
- (Thailand) Anuruck Srikerd
- (Thailand) Dusit Chalermsan
- (Thailand) Surachai Jaturapattarapong
- (Thailand) Tananchai Boriban
- (Thailand) Worrawoot Srimaka
- (Vietnam) Nguyễn Hồng Sơn
- (Vietnam) Triệu Quang Hà
- (Vietnam) Trương Việt Hoàng

== Final ranking ==
Pos	Team	Pld	W	D	L	GF	GA	GD	Pts	Final result
1	Thailand	6	5	1	0	24	1	+23	16	Gold Medal
2	Vietnam	6	4	1	1	14	2	+12	13	Silver Medal
3	Indonesia	6	3	2	1	11	2	+9	11	Bronze Medal
4	Singapore	6	3	2	1	8	5	+3	11	Fourth place
5	Malaysia	4	2	0	2	10	10	0	6	Eliminated in group stage
6	Myanmar	4	1	1	2	4	10	−6	4	Eliminated in group stage
7	Laos	4	1	1	2	4	15	−11	4	Eliminated in group stage
8	Brunei (H)	4	0	1	3	4	11	−7	1	Eliminated in group stage
9	Cambodia	4	0	1	3	5	13	−8	1	Eliminated in group stage
10	Philippines	4	0	0	4	3	18	−15	0	Eliminated in group stage

(H) Hosts
