= Setyabudi =

Setyabudi or Setiabudi is an Indonesian surname that may refer to

- Ernest Douwes Dekker (Danudirja Setyabudi, 1879–1950), Indonesian-Dutch freedom fighter, nationalist and politician of Indo descent.
- Agung Setyabudi (born 1972), Indonesian footballer.

Setiabudi (a place) in Indonesia that may refer to

- Setiabudi is a subdistrict in South Jakarta, capital city of Indonesia.
