= Andrian Mardiansyah =

Indonesian footballer and manager

Personal information
- Full name: Andrian Mardiansyah
- Date of birth: 14 November 1978 (age 47)
- Place of birth: Bogor, Indonesia
- Height: 1.78 m (5 ft 10 in)
- Position: Midfielder

Senior career*
Years	Team	Apps	(Gls)
1998–1999	Persikota Tangerang		
1999–2002	Persija Jakarta		
2002–2003	Persib Bandung	24	(5)
2003–2005	Deltras Sidoarjo		
2005–2006	PSIS Semarang		
2006–2008	Persikabo Bogor	28	(4)
2008–2009	Persiba Balikpapan		
2009–2010	Persidafon Dafonsoro		
2010–2012	PSIS Semarang		
Total		52	(9)

International career
1999	Indonesia	5	(1)
- * Club domestic league appearances and goals

Andrian Mardiansyah (born 14 November 1978) is an Indonesian former football player and manager who previously plays as midfielder for Persikota Tangerang, Persija Jakarta, Persib Bandung, Deltras Sidoarjo, PSIS Semarang, Persikabo Bogor, Persiba Balikpapan, Persidafon Dafonsoro and the Indonesia national team.

== Club statistics ==
Club	Season	Super League		Premier Division		Piala Indonesia		Total	
Club	Season	Apps	Goals	Apps	Goals	Apps	Goals	Apps	Goals
Persib Bandung	2002	-		19	0	-		19	0
Persikabo Bogor	2007-08	-		20	0	-		20	0
Total		-		39	0	-		39	0

== International career ==
He received his first international cap on 31 July 1999 and retired from the Indonesia national football team in 1999, appearing in 5 matches. Andrian scored the first goal for Indonesia in the 1999 Southeast Asian Games football tournament against Cambodia.

=== International goals ===
Andrian Mardiansyah: International goals
No.	Date	Venue	Opponent	Score	Result	Competition
1	31 July 1999	Berakas Track and Field Complex, Bandar Seri Begawan, Brunei	Cambodia	1-0	1-0	1999 Southeast Asian Games

== Hounors ==
Persija Jakarta

- Liga Indonesia Premier Division: 2001

Indonesia

- SEA Games bronze medal: 1999

Individual

- Liga Indonesia Premier Division Top Goalscorer: 2008–09 (shared)
