= Moksen Mohammad =

Bruneian footballer and coach

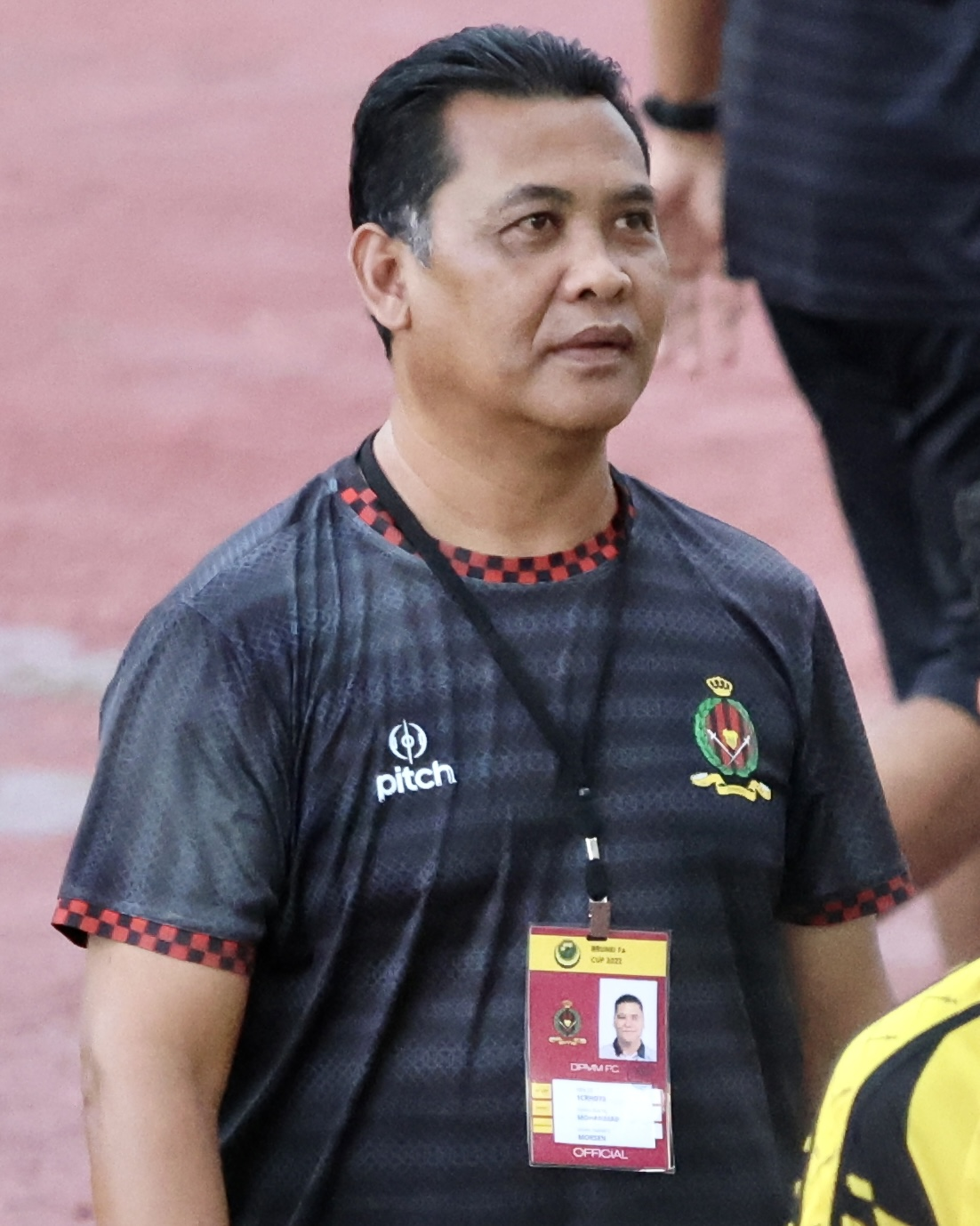
- Moksen in 2022

Personal information
- Full name: Moksen bin Mohammad
- Date of birth: 22 August 1971 (age 55)
- Place of birth: Brunei
- Positions: Defender; forward

Senior career*
Years	Team	Apps	(Gls)
1992–1999	Brunei		

International career^{‡}
1992–1999	Brunei	8+	(0+)

Managerial career
- 2000–2003: Kasuka
- 2001–2002: Brunei (assistant coach)
- 2005: Brunei U20
- 2008: Brunei (assistant coach)
- 2008: NBT
- 2011: Indera
- 2011–12: Brunei U21 (assistant coach)
- 2013–: DPMM (assistant coach)
- 2016: Brunei (assistant coach)
- * Club domestic league appearances and goals as of 3 March 2017 ‡ National team caps and goals as of 10 October 2024

Moksen bin Mohammad is a Bruneian former international footballer and current coach. He previously played for the Brunei national representative team in the M-League as a defender or forward.

== Playing and coaching career ==
Moksen represented Brunei in the Malaysian leagues from 1992 until 1999. Under English coaches Mick Lyons and David Booth, Brunei turned from minnows to powerhouses that regularly featured in the latter stages of the league season's pinnacle showcase the Malaysia Cup. He retired from the team after winning the 1999 edition of said competition, one of seven players to do so.

Moksen soon took up coaching and steered Kasuka FC to becoming district league champions in 2000, as well as beating a very young DPMM FC to domestic silverware the following year. This did not go unnoticed with his former coach Mick Jones who made Moksen his assistant in 2001.

Moksen coached the Brunei under-20s at the 2005 AFF U-20 Youth Championship held in Indonesia. His next assignment was for the national team at the 2008 AFC Challenge Cup qualification matches held in the Philippines as assistant to Kwon Oh-son. He then briefly coached NBT FC in 2008 and Indera SC in 2011, and was back with Kwon for the locally-held 2012 Hassanal Bolkiah Trophy which Brunei won.

Moksen was installed by Brunei DPMM FC as assistant coach to the arriving Steve Kean in November 2013, and has been in that position since. Moksen also became assistant coach for the Brunei national team once again, when Kwon was reassigned as Brunei head coach in October 2016.

== International career ==
Moksen played for the Brunei national team in all four matches at the 1996 AFF Championship held in Singapore, the most memorable one being a 1–0 victory over the Philippines.

Moksen appeared for the Wasps as hosts at the 20th SEA Games, playing all four games as Brunei failed to advance to the semi-finals. He appeared alongside Jefry and Irwan in three of the four games.

== Honours ==
=== Player ===
Brunei M-League Team

- Malaysia Cup: 1999

=== Coach ===
Kasuka FC

- Brunei-Muara District League Division 3: 2000
- Pengiran Sengamara Di Raja Cup: 2000
- Pepsi Cup: 2001

Brunei U21 (assistant)

- Hassanal Bolkiah Trophy: 2012

DPMM FC (assistant)

- Singapore League Cup: 2014
- S.League: 2015
- Singapore Premier League: 2019

=== Individual ===
- Order of Setia Negara Brunei Fourth Class (PSB) (2012)
- Meritorious Service Medal (PJK; 1999)

== Personal life ==
He is the brother of fellow Bruneian internationals Jefry and Irwan, as well as Sufri who he had coached at Kasuka FC. He is unrelated to his contemporary Martilu Mohamed.
