= Chalana Luang-Amath =

Laotian footballer (born 1971)

Personal information
- Date of birth: 10 May 1971 (age 55)
- Place of birth: Vientiane, Laos
- Height: 1.70 m (5 ft 7 in)
- Position: Midfielder

Senior career*
Years	Team	Apps	(Gls)
–1999	Lao Army FC		
2000–2002	Yotha FC		
2003	Udon Thani FC		
2005–2006	Vientiane FC		

International career
1993–2004	Laos	36	(5)
- * Club domestic league appearances and goals

Chalana Luang-Amath (born 10 May 1971) is a Laotian former footballer who played as a midfielder.

== Life and career ==
Luang-Amath was born on 10 May 1971 in Vientiane, Laos. He has been married. He has a daughter and a son. He has worked for the Lao General Department of Customs. He mainly operated as a midfielder. He could also operate as a right-back. He started his career with Laotian side Lao Army FC. In 2000, he signed for Laotian side Yotha FC. In 2003, he signed for Thai side Udon Thani FC. In 2005, he signed for Laotian side Vientiane FC.

Luang-Amath was a Laos international. He has been regarded as one of the most prominent Laos players. He played for the Laos national football team at the 1993 SEA Games, 1996 AFF Championship, 1997 SEA Games, 1998 AFF Championship, 1999 SEA Games, 2000 AFF Championship, 2002 AFF Championship, 2006 FIFA World Cup qualification, and 2004 AFF Championship.

== International goals ==
No.	Date	Venue	Opponent	Score	Result	Competition
1.	5 September 1996	Jurong Stadium, Jurong, Singapore	Vietnam	1–0	1–1	1996 AFF Championship
2.	3 August 1999	Berakas Sports Complex, Bandar Seri Begawan, Brunei	Philippines	3–2	3–2	1999 SEA Games
3.	11 December 2004	Mỹ Đình National Stadium, Hanoi, Vietnam	Cambodia	1–1	2–1	2004 AFF Championship
4.	11 December 2004	Mỹ Đình National Stadium, Hanoi, Vietnam	Cambodia	2–1	2–1	2004 AFF Championship
5.	13 December 2004	Mỹ Đình National Stadium, Hanoi, Vietnam	Singapore	2–4	2–6	2004 AFF Championship
