= Haryanto Prasetyo =

Indonesian footballer and manager

Haryanto
Personal information
- Full name: Hariyanto Prasetyo Adi Utomo
- Date of birth: 3 April 1978 (age 48)
- Place of birth: Sukoharjo, Indonesia
- Height: 1.70 m (5 ft 7 in)
- Position: Midfielder

Senior career*
Years	Team	Apps	(Gls)
1996–1999	Persebaya Surabaya		
2000–2001	Pelita Jaya	14+	(0+)
2002–2003	Persijatim		
2004–2005	Persijap Jepara		
2006	PSS Sleman	17	(1)
2008–2011	Persiku Kudus		
Total		31+	(1+)

International career
1999	Indonesia	10	(3)

Managerial career
- 2021–2022: Persis Solo (Assistant coach)
- 2023: Indonesia (Assistant coach)
- 2024–2025: Indonesia U-17 (Assistant coach)
- 2025–: Indonesia U-20 (Assistant coach)
- * Club domestic league appearances and goals

Haryanto Prasetyo (born 3 April 1978) is an Indonesian football player and manager who previously plays as midfielder for Persebaya Surabaya, Pelita Jaya FC, Persijatim, Persijap Jepara, PSS Sleman, Persiku Kudus and the Indonesia national team.

== Club statistics ==
Club	Season	Super League		Premier Division		Piala Indonesia		Total	
Club	Season	Apps	Goals	Apps	Goals	Apps	Goals	Apps	Goals
Persijatim	2002	-		14	0	-		14	0
PSS Sleman	2007-08	-		17	1	-		17	1
Total		-		31	1	-		31	1

== International career ==
He received his first international cap on 31 July 1999 and retired from the Indonesia national football team on 20 November 1999, appearing in 10 matches. Haryanto scored the first goal for Indonesia in the Football at the 1999 Southeast Asian Games against Malaysia.

=== International goals ===
Haryanto Prasetyo: International goals
No.	Date	Venue	Opponent	Score	Result	Competition
1	2 August 1999	Berakas Track and Field Complex, Bandar Seri Begawan, Brunei	Cambodia	1-0	6-0	1999 Southeast Asian Games
3	30 October 1999	Phnom Penh, Cambodia	Cambodia	0-1	1-5	2000 AFC Asian Cup qualification

== Hounors ==
Indonesia

- SEA Games bronze medal: 1999
