= Zulkarnaen Zainal =

Singaporean footballer

Personal information
- Full name: Zulkarnaen bin Zainal
- Date of birth: 1 October 1973 (age 53)
- Place of birth: Singapore
- Height: 1.75 m (5 ft 9 in)
- Position: Left back

Senior career*
| Years | Team | Apps | (Gls) |
| 1992–1993 | Admiralty FC | | |
| 1994 | Tiong Bahru Constituency | | |
| 1996–2001 | Geylang United | 82 | (4) |
| 2002–2003 | Woodlands Wellington | | |
| 2004–2011 | Tampines Rovers | 150 | (3) |

International career
| 1995–2004 | Singapore | 71 | (8) |
- * Club domestic league appearances and goals

Zulkarnaen bin Zainal (born 1 October 1973) is a Singaporean former footballer. He played as a left-back or left midfielder.

He was a member of the Singapore national team that won the 1998 AFF Championship.

Zulkarnaen also played in a friendly exhibition match against both Premier League club, a 2–0 lost against Liverpool on 16 July 2001 and a 1–8 lost to Manchester United on 24 July at the Kallang National Stadium. He has also played against a few powerhouse team including the likes of Finland, Uruguay, Norway, Japan and New Zealand in his time for the national team.

== Club career ==
Zulkarnaen started off his career at Admiralty as a promising young fullback in1992 and was caught in the middle of a transfer controversy when the Football Association of Singapore banned him for eight months after discovering that he had registered himself with Admiralty and South Avenue SC, a club which plays in the First Division as well. The ban was later reduced to three months to allow him to be involved competitively after his recent seven-week training stint with FC Nitra in Slovakia.

Zainal won the 2001 S.League with Geylang United as the club captain before joining Woodlands Wellington in 2002. In 2004, Zulkarnaen joined Tampines Rovers and stayed with the club for 8 seasons before retiring at the age of 38.

== International career ==
Zulkarnaen make his Singapore national team debut on 4 December 1995 during the 1995 SEA Games where he scores an equaliser in a 2–2 draw to Brunei at the Lamphun Province Stadium. The Bronze medal in the tournament is won.

During the 1998 FIFA World Cup qualification match against Lebanon on 13 April 1997. Zulkarnaen scored a late stoppage time goal in the 90+2 minute to equalise the game at 1–1 thus earning Singapore a point in the qualifiers.

Zulkarnaen was selected in the Singapore squad that won the 1998 AFF Championship where he scored a goal against Laos in a 4–1 win on 30 August 1998.

During the 2000 AFC Asian Cup qualification, Zulkarnaen scores the only goal in the match as he secures an important three points win over Macau on 16 February 2000.

On 9 August 1999 which technically fall on Singapore national day, as the team was down 1–0 to Malaysia, Zulkarnaen scored in the 89th-minute equaliser before teammate, Nazri Nasir scored the winning goal in the 90+5 injury stoppage time goal to secure the win.

== Career statistics ==
=== International ===
International goals by date, venue, cap, opponent, score, result and competition
| No. | Date | Venue | Opponent | Score | Result | Competition |
|---|---|---|---|---|---|---|
| 1 | 4 December 1995 | Lamphun Province Stadium, Lamphun, Thailand | Brunei | 2–2 | 2–2 | 1995 SEA Games |
| 2 | 13 April 1997 | Bourj Hammoud Stadium, Beirut, Lebanon | Lebanon | 1–1 | 1–1 | 1998 FIFA World Cup qualification |
| 3 | 9 October 1997 | Lebak Bulus Stadium, Jakarta, Indonesia | Myanmar | 2–2 | 2–2 | 1997 SEA Games |
| 4 | 30 August 1998 | Hanoi Stadium, Hanoi, Vietnam | Laos | 1–0 | 4–1 | 1998 AFF Championship |
| 5 | 9 August 1999 | Berakas Track and Field Complex, Bandar Seri Begawan, Brunei | Cambodia | 1–0 | 2–0 | 1999 SEA Games |
| 6 | 16 February 2000 | Centro Desportivo Olímpico - Estádio, Taipa, Macau | Macau | 1–0 | 1–0 | 2000 AFC Asian Cup qualification |
| 7 | 27 January 2001 | Singapore National Stadium, Kallang, Singapore | Thailand | 1–1 | 1–1 | Friendly |
| 8 | 9 August 1999 | Darul Makmur Stadium, Pahang, Malaysia | Malaysia | 1–1 | 2–1 | Friendly |

== Honours ==
=== Club ===
==== Geylang United ====
- S.League: 2001

=== International ===
Singapore

- SEA Games: 1995 'Bronze medal'
- AFF Championship: 1998
