= Jefry Mohammad =

Bruneian footballer

Personal information
- Full name: Jefry bin Mohammad
- Date of birth: 13 June 1967 (age 59)
- Place of birth: Brunei
- Position: Goalkeeper

Senior career*
Years	Team	Apps	(Gls)
- Brunei

International career^{‡}
1999–2001	Brunei	8	(0)
- * Club domestic league appearances and goals as of 22 November 2016 ‡ National team caps and goals as of 22 November 2016

Jefry bin Mohammad (born 13 June 1967) is a Bruneian retired footballer who played as a goalkeeper for the Brunei M-League representative team.

Jefry was the third-choice goalkeeper for Brunei in the late nineties as the pair of Yunos Yusof and Ibrahim Abu Bakar were the two established shot-stoppers for the Wasps since the mid-eighties. Yunos retired in 1999 and Ibrahim followed suit in 2000, which meant that Jefry became the first-choice goalkeeper for the national team at the turn of the century.

== International career ==
Jefry was the goalkeeper for Brunei at the 20th SEA Games held for the first (and so far only) time in his home country. The Wasps failed to advance to the semi-final stage. This was followed by the 2000 AFC Asian Cup qualification held in Macau where Jefry conceded nine goals against Japan.

His final appearance was at the 2002 World Cup qualifying for Asia, where he played the full 90 minutes in the 0–1 defeat against India.

== Personal life ==
He has two brothers who are also former Brunei internationals: Moksen and Irwan were his teammates when they were playing in the M-League in the late nineties.
