= Bima Sakti =

Indonesian footballer and manager (born 1976)

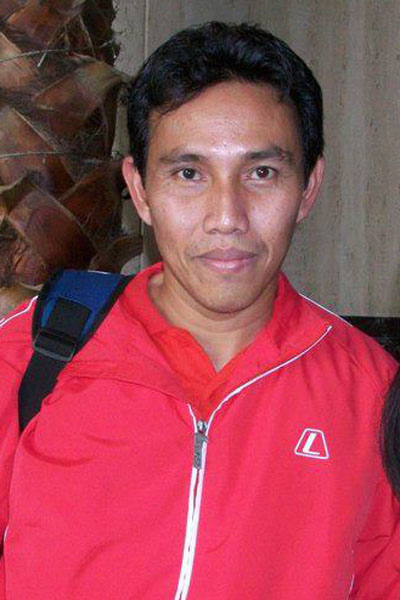

Personal information
- Full name: Bima Sakti Tukiman
- Date of birth: 23 January 1976 (age 50)
- Place of birth: Balikpapan, Indonesia
- Height: 1.72 m (5 ft 7 1/2 in)
- Position: Midfielder

Team information
- Current team: Persela Lamongan (head coach)

Youth career
- 1991: Ossiana Sakti
- 1992: PKT Bontang
- 1993: Sampdoria Primavera

Senior career*
Years	Team	Apps	(Gls)
1994−1995	PKT Bontang	12	(2)
1997−1999	Pelita Jaya	23	(4)
1999−2001	PSM Makassar	58	(1)
2001−2004	PSPS Pekanbaru	36	(1)
2004−2005	Persiba Balikpapan	14	(1)
2005−2012	Persema Malang	72	(6)
2012−2013	Perseba Bangkalan	14	(0)
2013−2014	Mitra Kukar	25	(1)
2014−2015	Gresik United	29	(2)
2015–2016	Persiba Balikpapan	16	(1)
Total		230	(19)

International career
1995–2001	Indonesia	58	(12)

Managerial career
- 2016: Persiba Balikpapan (Assistant coach)
- 2017–2018: Indonesia (Assistant coach)
- 2017–2018: Indonesia U23 (Assistant coach)
- 2018: Indonesia (Caretaker)
- 2019: Indonesia U19
- 2019–2023: Indonesia U17
- 2023: Indonesia U23 (Assistant coach)
- 2024–2025: Indonesia U20 (Assistant coach)
- 2025: Indonesia (Caretaker assistant coach)
- 2025–: Persela Lamongan
- * Club domestic league appearances and goals

Bima Sakti Tukiman (born 23 January 1976) is a former Indonesian football player and currently head coach of Persela Lamongan. He was named after the Milky Way galaxy, called "Bima Sakti" in Indonesian language.

== Managerial statistics ==
As of match played 16 November 2023

Managerial record by team and tenure
Team	Nat	From	To	Record							
Team	Nat	From	To	G	W	D	L	GF	GA	GD	Win %
Indonesia (Caretaker)	(Indonesia)	22 October 2018	31 December 2018	4	1	1	2	5	6	−1	25.00
Indonesia U19	(Indonesia)	1 January 2019	31 December 2019	10	7	2	1	36	10	+26	70.00
Indonesia U17	(Indonesia)	1 September 2022	31 December 2023	8	3	2	3	23	13	+10	37.50
Career Total				22	11	5	6	64	29	+35	50.00

== Club career ==
Shortly after graduating from PSSI Primavera program, he did an unsuccessful trial at Helsingborg IF, however he did brings home valuable lesson about the vastly different approach of attitude at training in Europe compared to his experience so far with local teams, which he recalled, "In Europe you have to give 100% even in training, because you'll carry that attitude in real match, while back then, in Indonesia training was more lax and our players rarely give his all to prevent exhaustion in training."

During his playing career, Bima played for PKT Bontang, Pelita Jaya, PSM Makassar, PSPS Pekanbaru, Persema Malang, Persepar Palangkaraya, Mitra Kukar, Gresik United and Persiba Balikpapan before his retirement in 2016.

== International career ==
His debut for the senior national team happened on 4 December 1995 at the age of 19. He was a member of PSSI Primavera Program in the mid-1990s. As of 2012, his total national caps were just short of Kurniawan Dwi Yulianto's (Kurniawan's 60 to Bima's 56 caps).

== Career statistics ==
=== International ===
Appearances and goals by national team and year
National team	Year	Apps	Goals
Indonesia	1995	2	0
Indonesia	1996	6	1
Indonesia	1997	16	3
Indonesia	1998	5	2
Indonesia	1999	11	3
Indonesia	2000	12	2
Indonesia	2001	6	1
Total		58	12

Scores and results list Indonesia's goal tally first, score column indicates score after each Bima goal.

List of international goals scored by Bima Sakti
No.	Date	Venue	Cap	Opponent	Score	Result	Competition
1	30 October 1996	Stadio La Sciorba, Genoa, Italy	3	Moldova	1–0	1–2	Friendly
2	6 April 1997	Gelora Senayan Stadium, Jakarta, Indonesia	14	Cambodia	7–0	8–0	1998 FIFA World Cup qualification
3	7 October 1997	Gelora Senayan Stadium, Jakarta, Indonesia	21	Vietnam	1–0	2–2	1997 SEA Games
4	16 October 1997	Gelora Senayan Stadium, Jakarta, Indonesia	23	Singapore	1–0	2–1	1997 SEA Games
5	27 August 1998	Thống Nhất Stadium, Ho Chi Minh City, Vietnam	25	Philippines	2–0	3–0	1998 AFF Championship
6	29 August 1998	Thống Nhất Stadium, Ho Chi Minh City, Vietnam	26	Myanmar	4–1	6–2	1998 AFF Championship
7	6 August 1999	Berakas Track and Field Complex, Bandar Seri Begawan, Brunei	33	Singapore	1–0	1–1	1999 SEA Games
8	9 August 1999	Berakas Track and Field Complex, Bandar Seri Begawan, Brunei	34	Vietnam	2–0	3–0	1999 SEA Games
9	9 August 1999	Berakas Track and Field Complex, Bandar Seri Begawan, Brunei	34	Vietnam	3–0	3–0	1999 SEA Games
10	30 August 2000	Gelora Senayan Stadium, Jakarta, Indonesia	42	Taiwan	1–0	1–0	2000 Independence Cup
11	3 September 2000	Gelora Senayan Stadium, Jakarta, Indonesia	44	Iraq	2–0	3–0	2000 Independence Cup
12	8 April 2001	Gelora Bung Karno Stadium, Jakarta, Indonesia	53	Maldives	3–0	5–0	2002 FIFA World Cup qualification

=== Managerial ===
Managerial record by team and tenure
Team	From	To	Record				
Team	From	To	P	W	D	L	Win %
Indonesia (Caretaker)	September 2018	November 2018	7	3	2	2	42.9
Total			7	3	2	2	42.9

== Honours ==
=== Player ===
PSM Makassar

- Liga Indonesia Premier Division: 1999–2000; runner up: 2001

Persema Malang

- Liga Indonesia Premier Division runner up: 2008–09

Perseba Bangkalan

- Liga Indonesia Third Division: 2013

Indonesia

- AFF Championship runner-up: 2000; third place: 1998
- SEA Games silver medal: 1997; bronze medal: 1999

Individual

- Liga Indonesia Premier Division Best Player: 1999–2000

=== Manager ===
Indonesia U17

- AFF U-16 Youth Championship: 2022; third place: 2019

Preceded by Aji Santoso	Indonesian Captain; 2001	Succeeded by Agung Setyabudi
