= Đặng Phương Nam =

Vietnamese footballer (born 1976)

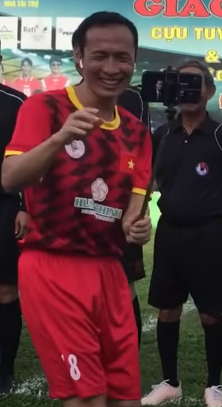
- Phương Nam in 2019

Personal information
- Full name: Đặng Phương Nam
- Date of birth: December 15, 1976 (age 49)
- Place of birth: Giao Thủy, Nam Định, Vietnam
- Height: 1.71 m (5 ft 7 in)
- Position: Striker

Youth career
- 1987–1992: Nam Định

Senior career*
Years	Team	Apps	(Gls)
1996–2009	Thể Công	388	(51)
Total		388	(51)

International career
1994–1996	Vietnam U23		
1996–2007	Vietnam	32	(10)
- * Club domestic league appearances and goals

Đặng Phương Nam is a Vietnamese pundit and former player. He has been a member of the Vietnam national football team from 1996 to 2007. He is noted for his performances at the 1996, 2000, 2002, and 2006 Tiger Cup.

== Honours ==
- Super Cup championship: 1999
- Asian Military Tiger Cup: 1998
- Gold Championships National Championships 1998
- Gold U21 Championships: 1997, 1998; 1999
- Military Sea Asian Games: 1999
- Tiger Cup Third place: 2002; 2007
- Asia Cup National Military: 2004
- Cup championship Military ASEAN: 2004
- King's Cup Runners-up: 2006
- Vietnam First Division: 2007

== International goals ==
#	Date	Venue	Opponent	Score	Result	Competition
1.	7 August 1996	Thống Nhất Stadium,Ho Chi Minh City,Vietnam	Guam	2–0	9–0	1996 AFC Asian Cup qualification
2.	7 August 1996	Thống Nhất Stadium,Ho Chi Minh City,Vietnam	Guam	4–0	9–0	1996 AFC Asian Cup qualification
3.	7 August 1996	Thống Nhất Stadium,Ho Chi Minh City,Vietnam	Guam	9–0	9–0	1996 AFC Asian Cup qualification
4.	3 August 1999	Berakas Sports Complex, Bandar Seri Begawan, Brunei	Myanmar	2–0	2–0	1999 Southeast Asian Games
5.	8 August 1999	Berakas Sports Complex, Bandar Seri Begawan, Brunei	Philippines	1–0	2-0	1999 Southeast Asian Games
6.	8 August 1999	Berakas Sports Complex, Bandar Seri Begawan, Brunei	Philippines	2–0	2-0	1999 Southeast Asian Games
7.	23 January 2000	Thống Nhất Stadium,Ho Chi Minh City,Vietnam	Guam	8–0	11–0	2000 AFC Asian Cup qualification
8.	23 December 2002	Lebak Bulus Stadium,Jakarta	Myanmar	2–1	4–2	2002 AFF Championship
9.	23 December 2002	Lebak Bulus Stadium,Jakarta	Myanmar	3–1	4–2	2002 AFF Championship
