= Marlon Piñero =

Filipino footballer (born 1972)

Personal information
- Date of birth: 10 January 1972 (age 54)
- Place of birth: Dumaguete, Philippines
- Position: Striker

Senior career*
Years	Team	Apps	(Gls)
2003–2004	Dumaguete		
2005–2012	Philippine Navy		

International career
1993–2004	Philippines	25	(3)
- * Club domestic league appearances and goals

Marlon Piñero (born 10 January 1972) is a former Filipino international footballer. He has also played for Philippine Navy and Dumaguete.

== International goals ==
Scores and results list the Philippines' goal tally first.

#	Date	Opponent	Venue	Score	Result	Competition
1.	15 May 1993	Brunei	Paglaum Sports Complex, Bacolod, Philippines	1–0	1–0	1993 Philippine International Cup
2.	1 August 1999	Myanmar	Berakas Sports Complex, Bandar Seri Begawan, Brunei	1–0	1–4	1999 Southeast Asian Games
3.	3 August 1999	Laos	Berakas Sports Complex, Bandar Seri Begawan, Brunei	2–2	2–3	1999 Southeast Asian Games
