= Nguyễn Liêm Thanh =

Vietnamese footballer

Personal information
- Date of birth: 5 June 1972 (age 54)
- Place of birth: Phnom Penh, Khmer Republic
- Height: 1.72 m (5 ft 8 in)
- Position: Midfielder

Senior career*
Years	Team	Apps	(Gls)
1991–2002	Hồ Chí Minh City Police		
2003	Đông Á Bank		
2004	Cảng Sài Gòn		
2005	Hà Nội ACB		

International career
1995–2002	Vietnam	11	(0)
2006	Vietnam Futsal		

Managerial career
- 2010–2013: Xi măng Xuân Thành Sài Gòn (assistant)
- 2014: Hùng Vương An Giang (assistant)
- 2014–2018: PVF (youth)
- 2019–2020: Cần Thơ (assistant)
- 2020: Cần Thơ
- 2023–2024: Hồ Chí Minh City (assistant)
- * Club domestic league appearances and goals

Nguyễn Liêm Thanh (born 5 June 1972) is a retired professional footballer who played as a midfielder. Born in Khmer Republic, he represented the Vietnam national football team.

== Early life ==
Michal was born in Phnom Penh, Khmer Republic (present day Cambodia) to a Cambodian father and a Vietnamese mother from Haiphong. His father, Liem Kuy was a driver for Norodom Sihanouk, the King of Cambodia. After the government of Pol Pot took over the country in 1975, Liêm Thanh's family moved to his aunt's house Ho Chi Minh City with his mother. Thereafter, the family lost contacted with Liêm Thanh's father as he was eventually murdered in the Cambodian genocide.

== Club career ==
Liêm Thanh started his career at the age of 12, when he was recruited to Hồ Chí Minh City's Sports Talents Center. In 1991, he joined Hồ Chí Minh City Police, where he won the Vietnamese National Championship in 1995. After the team dissolved in 2002, he played for Đông Á Bank, Cảng Sài Gòn and Hà Nội ACB before retiring in 2005.

== International career ==
Liêm Thanh represented Vietnam national team at the 1995 and 1999 SEA Games, winning the silver medal in both editions.

In 2006, Liêm Thanh was called up to the Vietnam national futsal team for the 2006 AFF Futsal Championship.

== Managerial career ==
After his retirement, Liêm Thanh became a football coach. He was assistant coach and youth team coach ín several teams, before becoming head coach for V.League 2 side Cần Thơ for a short period in 2020.

== Honours ==
Hồ Chí Minh City Police

- V.League 1: 1995
- Vietnamese Cup: 1998, 2001

Vietnam

- SEA Games silver medal: 1995, 1999

== See also ==
- List of Vietnam footballers born outside Vietnam
