= Cosmopolitan College of Commerce and Technology =

Private college in Brunei

- Kolej Perdagangan dan Teknologi Cosmopolitan (Malay) كوليج ڤرداڬڠن دان تيكنولوڬي چوسموڤوليتن (Jawi)
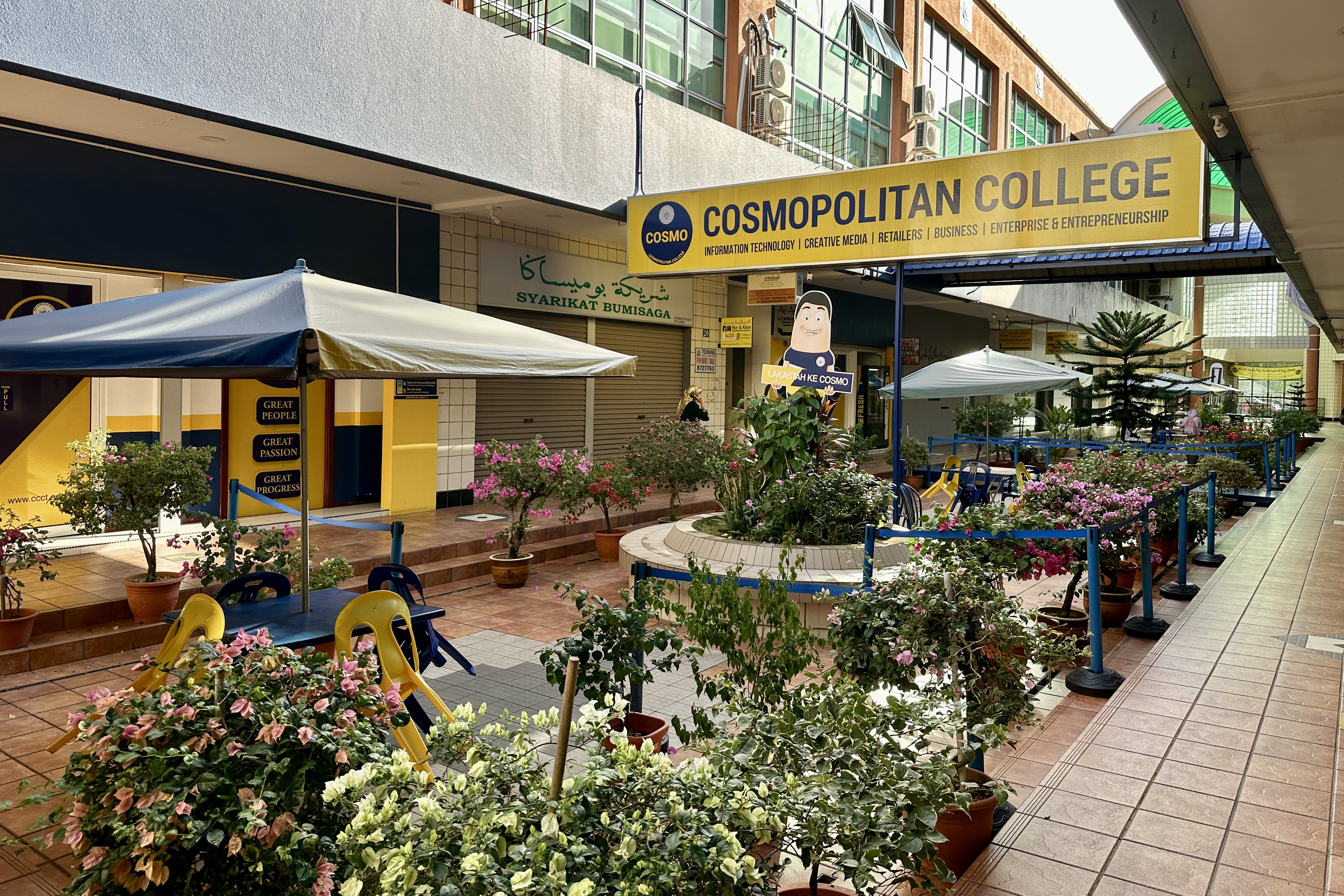
- The campus in 2024
- Motto: Furthering Your Employability Potential
- Type: Private vocational school
- Established: 2004
- Academic affiliations: BTEC, City and Guilds
- Chairman: Abdul Aziz Abdul Latip
- Principal: Nadirah Jambol
- Director: Prabhu Sethuratnam
- Managing Director: Nandakumar Sanmugam
- Academic staff: 40 (2014)
- Students: 1,200 (2014)
- Location: Unit 5 & 6, Jaya Square, Simpang 13, Kampong Jaya Setia, Berakas, Bandar Seri Begawan, BB 2713, Brunei; 4.9410452°N 114.9394698°E
- Campus: Metropolitan
- Website: ccct.edu.bn

The Cosmopolitan College of Commerce and Technology (Malay: Kolej Perdagangan dan Teknologi Cosmopolitan; abbreviated as COSMO or CCCT) is a private vocational school located at Kampong Jaya Setia, Brunei. It provides programs that develop both soft and technical skills in Bruneian students, aiming to prepare them for personal and professional success by enhancing their communication, collaboration, resilience, and adaptability to the evolving corporate landscape.

== Background ==
In 2004, CCCT was founded with a mere 25 pupils. Since September 2011, 1,200 students have been awarded BPTV scholarships, enabling them to attend the institution. It offers eight courses that span from HND to LCCI. They are in the midst of initiating degree programs that have already received approval from the Ministry of Education (MoE) as well as informatics courses like the diploma and advance diploma in gaming and animation.

== Programmes ==
CCCT provided a number of Pearson-BTEC business, IT, and creative media programs. The Level-1 Introductory Diploma in Business, Level-2 International Certificate in Business, Level-3 Diploma in Business, and Level-5 HND in Business are the programs offered in the field of business. Programs in IT include the Level-1 Introductory Diploma in Computing, the Level-2 International Certificate in Computing, the Level-3 Diploma in Computing, and the Level-5 HND in Computing. The following are programs in creative media: Level-1 Introductory Diploma in Digital Media; Level-2 International Certificate in Creative Media Production; Level-3 Diploma in Creative Media Production; and Level-5 HND in Creative Media Production (Visual Effects).

CCCT educators and students have participated in a number of public programs and events to highlight their varied interests. Students enrolled in the multimedia program receive industrial training through Paperplane Media, where they arrange events to acquire expertise. Furthermore, in order to improve their abilities, BTEC instructors completed a professional development course. Additionally, the organisation organised a learning tour to Cyber Security Brunei, offering an insight about the cybersecurity industry. CCCT organised a drone-focused technology lecture in association with K-MAS Management with the goal of improving students' employability and equipping them for next industry advancements. Additionally, students participated in a CV writing clinic hosted by the Brunei Institute of Islamic Leadership and Finance (BILIF), which aimed to increase their employability and alleviate unemployment in Brunei.

== Student life ==
Over 4,149 students have graduated from CCCT overall since the school's founding as of 24 June 2023. Adult people who want to continue their education but lack a basic certification are applying to the college.

== Affiliations and collaborations ==
CCCT is a partner of several organisations consisting of Brunei Halal Foods, University of Technology Brunei, Rizal Technological University, and HiTUNE.
