= Kampong Jaya Setia =

Jaya Setia
- Village
- Kampong Jaya Setia
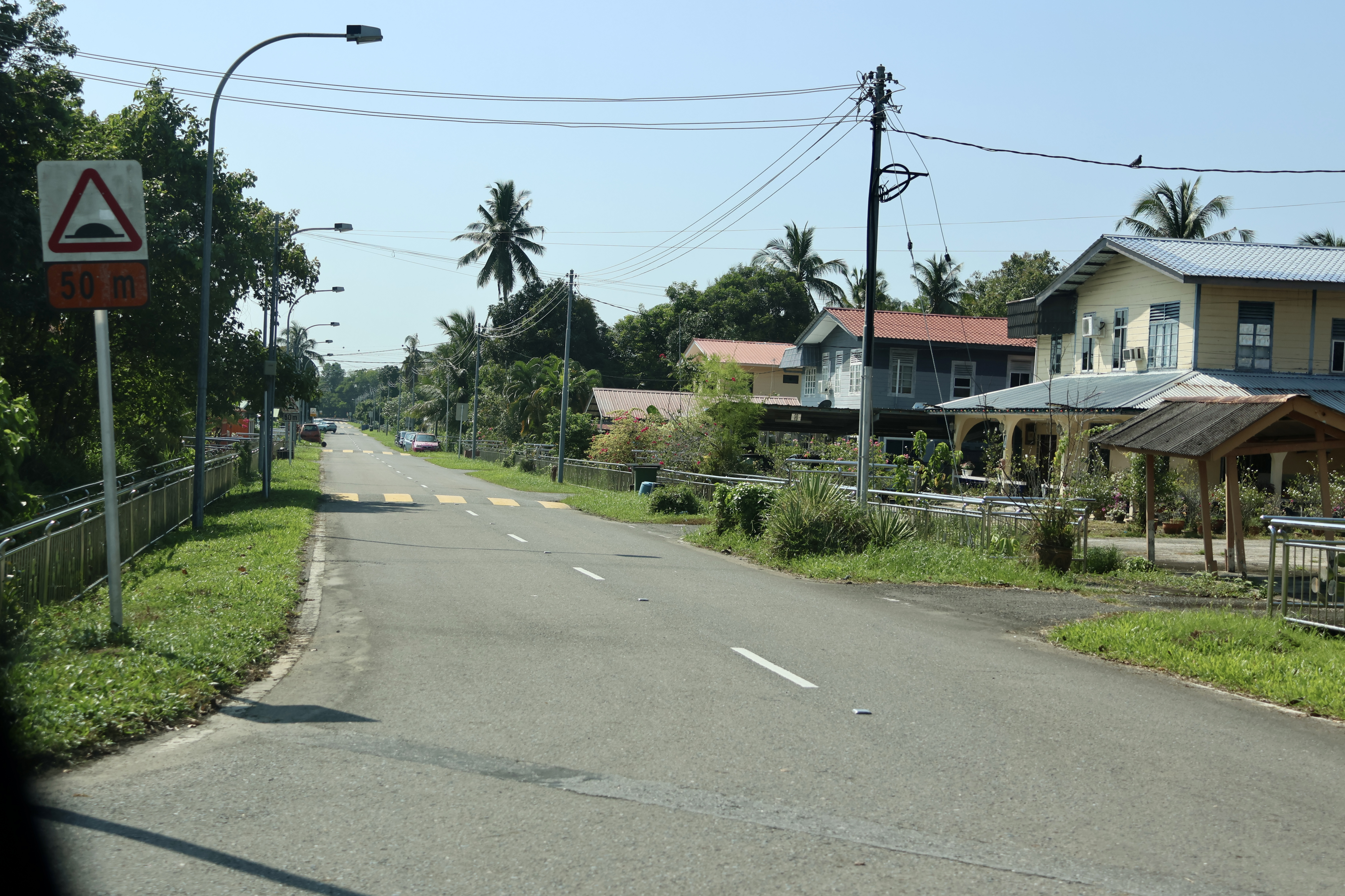
- Jalan Bunga Kuning

- Location in Brunei
- Coordinates: 4°56′04″N 114°56′06″E
- Country: Brunei
- District: Brunei-Muara
- Mukim: Berakas 'A'

Population (2016)
  - Total: 855
- Time zone: UTC+8 (BNT)
- Postcode: BB2713

Kampong Jaya Setia is a village in Brunei-Muara District, Brunei, and a neighbourhood in the capital Bandar Seri Begawan. The population was 855 in 2016. It is one of the villages within Mukim Berakas 'A'. The postcode is BB2713.

== History ==
Originally Kampong Jaya Setia was a government housing relocation plan for residents from Kampong Ayer to land. Residents who moved following the government's housing relocation plan came from Kampong Sungai Kebun, Kampong Saba and other villages. The narrator's family is from Sungai Kebun. This relocation plan started in 1965, which was given to the applicants with an area of half an acre, while four acres were allocated for gardening and cultivation where the proceeds would later be used to repay the house debt to the government. All facilities such as roads, electricity and clean water are provided by the government. This relocation housing plan is built on one floor only with wooden walls. Then whoever has the ability can do so by adding below the house.

Here while cutting rubber in the Berakas Estate area as a side income to pay back the debt with his house. Kampong Jaya Setia is actually a Government Housing Relocation Scheme for the residents of Kampong Ayer who moved to land consisting of Kampong Tamoi, Kampong Saba, Kampong Pandai Besi and Kampong Sungai Kebun. The houses here are built with only one floor as many as 50 houses with board walls with an area of three quarters of an acre of land for farming to meet daily needs.

In the beginning the area of Kampong Jaya Setia was just a forest and a rubber island. When the narrator moved to the village, facilities such as clean water and electricity were already provided by the government and there were only two or three houses at that time. Most of the residents come from Kampong Ayer such as Kampong Pengiran Kerma Indera Lama, Kampong Pengiran Bendahara Lama, and Kampong Saba. Most of the residents at that time gardened cassava and the produce was sold to the villagers with an income of approximately BND30 per day.

== Economy ==
The Village Consultative Council (MPK) has identified a number of projects that have the potential to become One Village One Product (1K1P), among which are products from coconut, iron/stainless steel carpentry (some youth have undergone a course in stainless steel work in June 2013 ) and fertigation farming. The focus has been on fertigation agriculture where the project site has already been identified, which is the old market site. Some residents consisting of MPK members and youths have already undergone this fertigation farming. On 4 June 2015, alongside other villages in collaboration with the Brunei-Muara District Department and the Prison Department held the 1K1P Sales Expo, and Handicrafts, Agriculture and the Prison Department Exhibition held for four days from 4 to 7 June 2015 in the foyer, Times Square Mall. The expo was organized by Berakas Mukim Consulting 'A'. Various products are featured such as handicrafts, agriculture and dry foods.

== Infrastructure ==
- Cosmopolitan College of Commerce and Technology (CCCT), a private vocational school
- Berakas Sports Complex, a multi-purpose stadium
