= Ali Sunan =

Indonesian footballer and manager

Personal information
- Date of birth: 1 November 1970 (age 55)
- Place of birth: Lamongan, Indonesia
- Height: 1.70 m (5 ft 7 in)
- Position: Midfielder

Senior career*
| Years | Team | Apps | (Gls) |
| 1991–1994 | PKT Bontang | | |
| 1998–1999 | PSIS Semarang | | |
| 1999–2000 | Persija Jakarta | | |
| 2001–2002 | Persela Lamongan | | |
| 2002–2005 | PSJS South Jakarta | | |

International career
| 1999 | Indonesia | 10 | (2) |
- * Club domestic league appearances and goals

Ali Sunan (born 1 November 1970) is an Indonesian former football player and manager who has previously played as a midfielder for PKT Bontang, PSIS Semarang, Persela Lamongan, PSJS South Jakarta and the Indonesia national team.

== International career ==
He received his first international cap on 31 July 1999 against Cambodia and retired from the Indonesia national football team on 20 November 1999 against Cambodia, appearing in 10 matches and scoring 2 goals. Ali scored the first goal for Indonesia in the Football at the 1999 Southeast Asian Games tournament against Malaysia.

=== International goals ===
Ali Sunan: International goals
| No. | Date | Venue | Opponent | Score | Result | Competition |
|---|---|---|---|---|---|---|
| 1 | 2 August 1999 | Berakas Track and Field Complex, Bandar Seri Begawan, Brunei | Malaysia | 5-0 | 6-0 | 1999 SEA Games |
| 2 | 30 October 1999 | Phnom Penh, Cambodia | Cambodia | 1-5 | 1-5 | 2000 AFC Asian Cup qualification |

== Honours ==
PSIS Semarang

- Liga Indonesia Premier Division: 1998–99

Indonesia

- SEA Games bronze medal: 1999

Individual

- Liga Indonesia Premier Division Best Player: 1998–99
