= Surachai Jirasirichote =

Thai footballer and coach (born 1970)

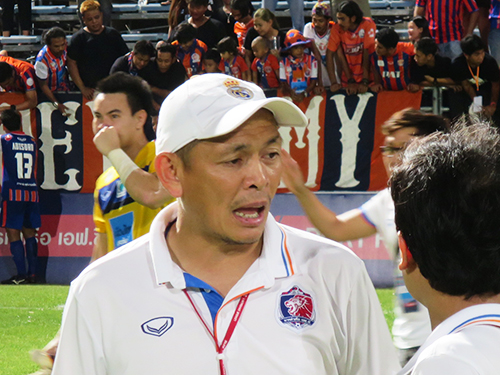

Personal information
- Full name: Surachai Jirasirichote
- Date of birth: 13 October 1970 (age 56)
- Place of birth: Nakhon Pathom, Thailand
- Height: 1.77 m (5 ft 9 1/2 in)
- Position: Defender

Senior career*
Years	Team	Apps	(Gls)
1996–2000	Sinthana		
2000–2002	Gombak United		
2003	Geylang United		
2004–2006	Chula-Sinthana		

International career
1989–2001	Thailand	55	(2)

Managerial career
- 2011: F.C. Phuket
- 2011: Raj-Vithi
- 2012: Thai Honda
- 2012: Lopburi
- 2013: Looktabfah
- 2014: Phitsanulok
- 2015–2016: Port (assistance)
- 2016–2017: Lampang
- 2018: JL Chiangmai United
- 2019: Phitsanulok
- 2019: Chiangmai United
- 2020–2022: Chiangmai United (assistant)
- 2022: Chiangmai United (interim)
- 2022: STK Muangnont
- 2023–2024: Chiangmai United
- 2024–2025: Udon United
Medal record
Thailand national football team
SEA Games
Gold medal – first place	Chiang Mai 1995	Team
Gold medal – first place	Jakarta 1997	Team
Gold medal – first place	Bandar Seri Begawan 1999	Team
- * Club domestic league appearances and goals

Surachai Jirasirichote (Thai สุรชัย จิระศิริโชติ) is a Thai football coach and former football player.

He has made several appearances for Thailand in FIFA World Cup qualifying matches.

== International goals ==
#	Date	Venue	Opponent	Score	Result	Competition
1.	November 6, 2000	Chiang Mai, Thailand	Myanmar	3-1	Won	2000 Tiger Cup
2.	May 28, 2001	Bangkok, Thailand	Pakistan	6-0	Won	2002 FIFA World Cup qualification

== Managerial statistics ==
As of matches played 21 November 2026

Managerial record by team and tenure
Team	From	To	Record				
Team	From	To	P	W	D	L	Win %
Chiangmai United	31 May 2018	24 July 2018	2	1	0	1	50.00
Chiangmai United (interim)	30 August 2019	16 January 2020	6	2	1	3	33.33
Chiangmai United (interim)	30 October 2020	12 November 2020	2	0	0	2	0.00
Chiangmai United	4 February 2022	6 June 2022	12	3	3	6	25.00
Chiangmai United	28 June 2023	14 July 2024	39	14	15	10	35.90
Udon United	15 July 2024	20 June 2025	1	0	0	1	0.00
Chiangmai United	1 July 2026	Present	13	3	4	6	23.08
Total			75	23	23	29	30.67
