= Thongchai Akkarapong =

Thai retired professional footballer

Personal information
- Full name: Thongchai Akkarapong
- Date of birth: 19 February 1976 (age 50)
- Place of birth: Songkhla, Thailand
- Height: 1.72 m (5 ft 7 1/2 in)
- Position: Attacking midfielder

Senior career*
| Years | Team | Apps | (Gls) |
| 1999–2001 | Sinthana | 43 | (4) |
| 2002 | Police United | 15 | (2) |
| 2003–2005 | Kelantan FA | 39 | (6) |
| 2006–2008 | Police United | 52 | (5) |
| 2009–2011 | Surat Thani | 3 | (0) |
| 2012 | Pattani | | |
| 2012 | Yala United | | |
| 2013 | Phattalung | | |
| Total | | 152 | (17) |

International career
| 2000–2004 | Thailand | 38 | (7) |
- * Club domestic league appearances and goals as of 22 June 2008

Thongchai Akkarapong (Thai: ธงชัย อัครพงษ์, born 19 February 1976) is a Thai retired professional footballer who played as an attacking midfielder.
