= Wirat Wangchan =

Thai footballer

Personal information
- Date of birth: 25 February 1976 (age 50)
- Place of birth: Surin, Thailand
- Height: 1.78 m (5 ft 10 in)
- Position: Goalkeeper

Senior career*
Years	Team	Apps	(Gls)
2000–2001	Sinthana		
2002–2005	Thai Port		
2017	Ayutthaya		

International career
1997–2001	Thailand	21	(0)

Managerial career
- 2015–2017: Thailand (goalkeeping coach)
- 2014–2015: Ayutthaya
- 2016: Ayutthaya Warrior
- 2017–2018: Ayutthaya
Medal record
Thailand national football team
Sea Games
Gold medal – first place	Sea Games 1999	Football
- * Club domestic league appearances and goals

Wirat Wangchan (born 25 February 1976) is a Thai former professional football goalkeeper who played for Thailand in the 2000 Asian Cup. He also played for Sinthana and Thai Port FC.
