= I Komang Putra =

Indonesian footballer

Personal information
- Full name: I Komang Putra Adnyana
- Date of birth: 6 May 1972 (age 54)
- Place of birth: Denpasar, Indonesia
- Height: 1.72 m (5 ft 8 in)
- Position: Goalkeeper

Team information
- Current team: PSIS Semarang (Goalkeeper coach)

Senior career*
Years	Team	Apps	(Gls)
1992–1998	Arseto	113	(0)
1998–2007	PSIS Semarang	161	(0)
2008–2010	Persema Malang	43	(0)
2010–2011	Persela Lamongan	15	(0)
2011–2012	Persis Solo	10	(0)
Total		342	(0)

International career
1999–2003	Indonesia	11	(0)

Managerial career
- 2019–: PSIS Semarang (Goalkeeper coach)
- * Club domestic league appearances and goals

I Komang Putra Adnyana (born 6 May 1972), also known as IKP, is an Indonesian former professional footballer as a goalkeeper who played for Indonesia in the 2000 Asian Cup. Currently, he works as goalkeeper coach for PSIS Semarang.

I Komang played for PSIS Semarang for almost a decade, helping the team to league championships in 1999 and 2001. He also played for Arseto, Persema Malang, Persela Lamongan and Persis Solo, the last club he played (also being made captain) before retiring.

== Honours ==
PSIS Semarang

- Liga Indonesia Premier Division: 1998–99; runner up: 2006
- Liga Indonesia First Division: 2001

Indonesia

- AFF Championship runner-up: 2000
- SEA Games bronze medal: 1999
