= 1995 V-League =

Vietnam National Elite Football Championship
- Season: 1995
- Dates: 5 March – 7 June
- Champions: Công An TP.HCM (1st title)
- Relegated: Bình Định; Long An; Quảng Nam-Đà Nẵng; Sông Bé
- Asian Club Championship: Công An TP.HCM
- Asian Cup Winners' Cup: Công An Hải Phòng
- Top goalscorer: Trần Minh Chiến (14 goals)

The 1995 Vietnam National Elite Football Championship was the 13th season of the National Football Championship in Vietnam, played from 5 March until 7 June 1995.

== Standings ==
1. Công An TP.HCM
2. Thừa Thiên Huế
3. Cảng Sài Gòn
4. An Giang
5. Khánh Hòa
6. Đồng Tháp
7. Lâm Đồng
8. Sông Lam Nghệ An
9. Quân Đội
10. Hải Quan
11. Sông Bé
12. Long An
13. Binh Dinh
14. Quảng Nam-Đà Nẵng

== Final round ==
Quarter-finals	Semi-finals (winners path)	Final (winenrs path)	Final
An Giang	1 (4)
Sông Lam Nghệ An	1 (5)
Sông Lam Nghệ An	0 (3)
Cảng Sài Gòn	0 (5)
Cảng Sài Gòn	1 (4)
Đồng Tháp	1 (3)
Cảng Sài Gòn	?
Công An TP.HCM	?
Công An TP.HCM	2 (4)
Lâm Đồng	2 (2)
Công An TP.HCM	3
Khánh Hòa	2
Khánh Hòa	2
Thừa Thiên Huế	1	Công An TP.HCM	3
Thừa Thiên Huế	1
Round 1 (losers path)	Quarter-finals (losers path)	Semi-finals (losers path)	Final (losers path)
Sông Lam Nghệ An	1
An Giang	3	An Giang	4	Cảng Sài Gòn	0
Đồng Tháp	2	An Giang	?	Thừa Thiên Huế	2
Thừa Thiên Huế	?
Khánh Hòa	3 (2)
Lâm Đồng	?	Thừa Thiên Huế	3 (4)
Thừa Thiên Huế	?

=== Final ===
7 June 1995

Công An TP.HCM	3–1	Thừa Thiên Huế
Chu Văn Mùi 3'; Lê Huỳnh Đức 10' (pen.); ? (?)		? (?)

Thống Nhất Stadium, Ho Chi Minh City
Attendance: 25,000

Vietnam National Elite Football Championship
Champions

1st title
