= Choketawee Promrut =

Thai footballer and manager

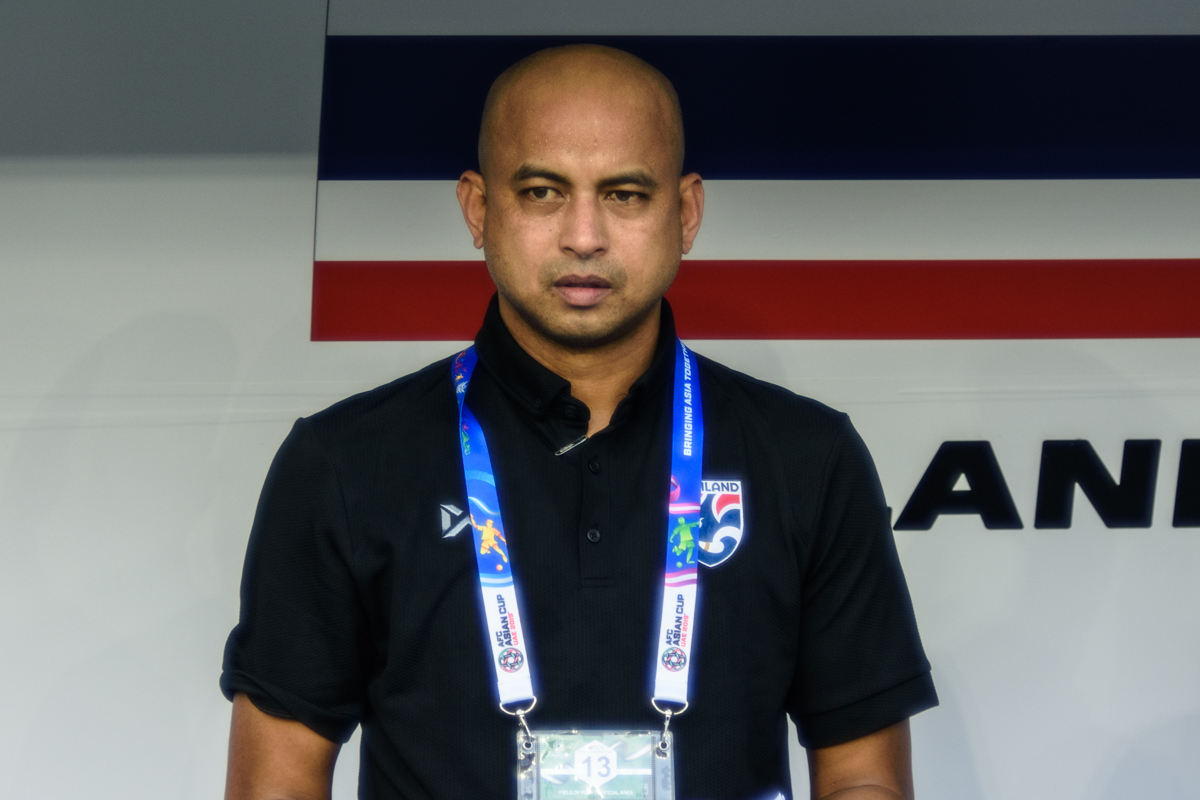
- Promrut as Thailand assistant coach at the 2019 AFC Asian Cup

Personal information
- Full name: Choketawee Promrut
- Date of birth: 16 March 1975 (age 51)
- Place of birth: Phang Nga, Thailand
- Height: 1.79 m (5 ft 10 1/2 in)
- Position: Centre-back

Youth career
- 1991–1992: Wat Suthiwararam School
- 1993: Bangkok Christian College

Senior career*
Years	Team	Apps	(Gls)
1994–2000	Thai Farmer Bank	132	(7)
2001	Gombak United	19	(3)
2001–2002	Bangkok Christian College	23	(0)
2002–2003	Tanjong Pagar United	33	(2)
2004	Tampines Rovers	28	(3)
2005	Hoang Anh Gia Lai	38	(2)
2006	Tampines Rovers	18	(0)
2007	Johor FC	26	(0)
2008	Provincial Electricity Authority	15	(0)
2009	Customs Department	21	(0)
2009	PTT Rayong	0	(0)
2010	Nonthaburi	2	(0)
Total		355	(17)

International career
1997–2005	Thailand	72	(4)

Managerial career
- 2013: BEC Tero Sasana (caretaker)
- 2014: Thailand U23 (assistant)
- 2014–2015: Thailand (assistant)
- 2015: Thailand U23
- 2016: Udon Thani
- 2017: Dome
- 2017: Chiangmai
- 2018–2019: Thailand (assistant)
- 2019–2020: Port
- 2020–2021: Nakhon Si United
- 2021–2022: Thailand U23 (assistant)
- 2023: Port
- 2023–2025: Port (assistant)
- 2024: Port (interim)
- 2025: Port (interim)
- 2025–: Thailand U23 (assistant)
Medal record
Thailand national football team
Sea Games
Gold medal – first place	Sea Games 1995	Player
Gold medal – first place	Sea Games 1997	Player
Gold medal – first place	Sea Games 1999	Player
Gold medal – first place	Sea Games 2013	Assistant coach
Gold medal – first place	Sea Games 2015	Head coach
ASEAN Football Championship
Winner	Tiger Cup 2000	Player
Winner	ASEAN Football Championship 2014	Assistant coach
- * Club domestic league appearances and goals

Choketawee Promrut (Thai: โชคทวี พรหมรัตน์, born 16 March 1975) is a Thai football manager and former player, who is the assistant coach of Thailand U23.

Choketawee was a member of Thailand players from 1997 until 2005, he also served as captain for Thailand in the 2004 AFC Asian Cup. In 2015, as head coach he led Thailand U23 to the 2015 Southeast Asian Games champions.

== International goals ==
List of international goals scored by Choketawee Promrut
#	Date	Venue	Opponent	Score	Result	Competition
1.	October 6, 1997	Jakarta, Indonesia	Myanmar	2–1	Won	1997 Southeast Asian Games
2.	March 26, 1998	Bangkok, Thailand	Kazakhstan	1–0	Won	Friendly
3.	July 30, 1999	Bandar Seri Begawan, Brunei	Philippines	9–0	Won	1999 Southeast Asian Games
4.	August 1, 1999	Bandar Seri Begawan, Brunei	Laos	4–1	Won	1999 Southeast Asian Games

== Managerial statistics ==
As of match played 30 April 2025

Managerial record by team and tenure
Team	From	To	Record							
Team	From	To	G	W	D	L	GF	GA	GD	Win %
BEC Tero (caretaker)	11 July 2013	10 August 2013	2	0	1	1	1	4	−3	0.00
Thailand U23	29 May 2015	15 June 2015	7	7	0	0	24	1	+23	100.00
Udon Thani	4 January 2016	30 November 2016	30	20	5	5	62	21	+41	66.67
Chiangmai	1 April 2017	30 November 2017	2	1	0	1	4	4	+0	50.00
Port	21 July 2019	30 March 2020	16	9	4	3	27	18	+9	56.25
Port	5 February 2023	8 November 2023	27	16	2	9	56	36	+20	59.26
Port (interim)	3 November 2024	10 November 2024	1	1	0	0	2	1	+1	100.00
Port (interim)	16 January 2025	7 May 2025	17	7	4	6	28	26	+2	41.18
Total			102	61	16	25	204	111	+93	59.80

^{1} A win or loss by the penalty shoot-out is counted as the draw in time.

== Honours ==
=== Player ===
PEA FC

- Thailand Premier League 2008

=== Manager ===
Thailand U23

- SEA Games Gold Medal: 2015

Udon Thani

- Thai Regional League Division : North-East Champion: 2016

Port

- Thai FA Cup: 2019

Individual

- Thai League 1 Coach of the Month: September 2019
