= Dusit Chalermsan =

Thai footballer

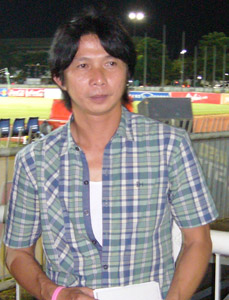
- Chalermsan in 2011

Personal information
- Full name: Dusit Chalermsan
- Date of birth: 22 April 1970 (age 56)
- Place of birth: Sakon Nakhon, Thailand
- Height: 1.84 m (6 ft 1/2 in)
- Positions: Left-back; defensive midfielder

Team information
- Current team: Mahasarakham (head coach)

Youth career
- 1983–1985: Chonburi Physical College
- 1986–1988: Sasana Wittaya School

Senior career*
Years	Team	Apps	(Gls)
1989–1993	Police United	92	(6)
1994–1999	BEC Tero Sasana	133	(14)
1999–2001	Mohun Bagan AC	44	(7)
2001–2002	BEC Tero Sasana	27	(2)
2003–2007	Hoang Anh Gia Lai	89	(7)
2008	Police United	11	(0)
Total		396	(36)

International career
1994–2004	Thailand	97	(14)

Managerial career
- 2006–2007: Hoang Anh Gia Lai (assistant)
- 2008–2009: Hoang Anh Gia Lai
- 2011: Hoang Anh Gia Lai
- 2011: Sriracha
- 2012: PTT Rayong
- 2013–2014: Singhtarua
- 2015–2016: Prachuap
- 2016–2017: Sisaket
- 2017–2018: Trat
- 2018–2021: BG Pathum United
- 2021: Rajpracha
- 2021: Port
- 2021–2022: BG Pathum United
- 2022: Lamphun Warriors
- 2022–2023: PT Prachuap
- 2023–2024: PT Prachuap (caretaker)
- 2024–2025: Kanchanaburi Power
- 2025: Kanchanaburi Power (club director)
- 2025–: Mahasarakham
Medal record
Thailand
SEA Games
Silver medal – second place	Singapore 1993	Team
Gold medal – first place	Chiang Mai 1995	Team
Gold medal – first place	Jakarta 1997	Team
Gold medal – first place	Bandar Seri Begawan 1999	Team
AFF Championship
Gold medal – first place	Singapore 1996	Team
Gold medal – first place	Thailand 2000	Team
Gold medal – first place	Indonesia-Singapore 2002	Team
- * Club domestic league appearances and goals

Dusit Chalermsan (born 22 April 1970; Thai: ดุสิต เฉลิมแสน) is a Thai association football manager and former player who is the head coach of Thai League 2 club Mahasarakham.

He played as a defender and scored 14 goals for the Thai national team. He played for the national team between 1996 and 2004.

== Playing career ==
=== Club career ===
In 1989, He started to play with Police United. After one season, He moved to BEC Tero Sasana in this club he plays AFC Champions League made him had more reputation for a remarkable ability free-kick, After he is well known in Asia football by playing for Asian All-Star Team to play 2000 Iran vs Asia All-Stars Game. He moved abroad in 1999, to play for Indian NFL side Mohun Bagan. In 2003, he moved once again to become a star in Vietnam with Hoàng Anh Gia Lai, where he helped win the V.League 1 title several times. Dusit was awarded a medal for his contributions to Vietnamese football. After he retired in 2008 he became a football coach.

=== International career ===
Dusit Chalermsan played 96 international matches and scored 14 goals for the national team.

== Managerial career ==
=== BG Pathum United ===
In 2019, BG Pathum United won the Thai League 2 title, earning promotion back to the top tier. The season after in the 2020–21 Thai League 1 season, BG Pathum United took the lead as league leaders of the Thai League on Day 7 and never looked back. Despite the league suspension due to the COVID-19 pandemic, the team maintained their form and didn't lose a game on their way to their first-ever Thai League 1 title.

Moreover, The Thai advanced playmaker, Sumanya Purisai received most valuable player at the end of the year. Sumanya Purisai, Andrés Túñez, Victor Cardozo, and Chatchai Budprom were all selected in the Thai League Best XI.

BG Pathum United held their title celebration party on 20 March 2021 when they beat Ratchaburi 2–0 on the club's final home game of the season. Unfortunately, Dusit Chalermsan and his team could not record an undefeated title run when they lost 1–0 to Muangthong United at the Thunderdome Stadium.

== Managerial statistics ==
As of match played 21 November 2026

Managerial record by team and tenure
Team	From	To	Record					Ref.
Team	From	To	P	W	D	L	Win %	Ref.
Singhtarua	1 January 2013	30 November 2014	38	15	9	14	39.5	
PT Prachuap	1 January 2015	30 November 2016	64	24	17	23	37.5	
Sisaket	1 January 2017	1 March 2017	3	0	0	3	0.0	
Trat	12 December 2017	9 October 2018	4	2	0	2	50.0	
BG Pathum United	24 October 2018	28 April 2021	71	52	11	8	73.2	
Port	20 July 2021	11 November 2021	12	5	3	4	41.7	
BG Pathum United	14 November 2021	17 January 2022	7	2	3	2	28.6	
Lamphun Warriors	20 May 2022	7 November 2022	13	2	3	8	15.4	
PT Prachuap	14 November 2022	26 August 2023	24	9	8	7	37.5	
PT Prachuap	12 December 2023	31 January 2024	4	2	1	1	50.0	
Kanchanaburi Power	5 November 2024	15 June 2025	27	12	10	5	44.4	
Kanchanaburi Power	16 June 2025	25 September 2025	5	0	3	2	0.0	
Mahasarakham	2 October 2025	Present	45	16	11	18	35.6	
Total			317	141	79	97	44.5	

== Honours ==
=== Player ===
Thailand

- Asian Games fourth place: 1998, 2002
- ASEAN Football Championship: 1996, 2000, 2002
- Sea Games: 1993, 1995, 1997, 1999
- King's Cup: 1994, 2000
- Independence Cup Indonesia: 1994

BEC-Tero Sasana

- Thai League 1: 2001–02

Mohun Bagan AC

- National Football League (India) : 1999-2000
- IFA Shield: 1999
- Durand Cup: 2000

Hoang Anh Gia Lai

- V.League 1: 2003, 2004

=== Manager ===
BG Pathum United

- Thai League 1: 2020–21
- Thai League 2: 2019

Kanchanaburi Power

- Thai League 2 play-offs: 2024–25

Individual

- Thai League 1 Coach of the Month: June 2014, September 2020, November 2020, April 2023
- Thai League 2 Manager of the Month: February 2025
