= V. Murugan =

Malaysian footballer

Veerappan Murugan or V. Murugan (born 3 April 1965 in Sungai Siput, Perak) is a Malaysian former footballer who played as a goalkeeper. He played with Perak FA, Kuala Lumpur FA, Selangor FA, Negeri Sembilan FA, Selangor Public Bank, PDRM FA, and Malacca FA, and won the Malaysian league, FA Cup, and Malaysia Cup with five different teams.

He holds the record for the oldest player in the Malaysian league, playing for Malacca at the age of 43. He is also a former member of the Malaysia national team.
