= Agung Setyabudi =

Indonesian footballer

Personal information
- Full name: Agung Setyabudi
- Date of birth: 2 November 1972 (age 53)
- Place of birth: Solo, Indonesia
- Height: 1.75 m (5 ft 9 in)
- Position: Defender

Senior career*
Years	Team	Apps	(Gls)
1992–1998	Arseto Solo		
1999–2001	PSIS Semarang		
2001–2002	Persebaya Surabaya		
2002–2005	PSIS Semarang		
2005–2010	Persis Solo		

International career
1993–2004	Indonesia	58	(1)
- * Club domestic league appearances and goals

Agung Setyabudi (born 2 November 1972 in Solo, Central Java) is an Indonesian former footballer, he normally played as a defender and is 175 cm (69 in) tall. He is former player for the Indonesia national football team, playing in the Olympic Games qualifiers, Tiger Cup and Asian Cup.

He previously played for PSIS Semarang.

== International career ==
=== International goals ===
No.	Date	Venue	Opponent	Score	Result	Competition
1.	8 April 2001	Gelora Bung Karno Stadium, Jakarta, Indonesia	Maldives	1–0	5–0	2002 FIFA World Cup qualification

== Honours ==
PSIS Semarang

- Liga Indonesia Premier Division: 1998–99
- Liga Indonesia First Division: 2001

Indonesia

- AFF Championship runner-up: 2002
- SEA Games bronze medal: 1999

Preceded by Bima Sakti	Indonesian Captain; 2002–2004	Succeeded by Ponaryo Astaman
