= Asmawi Bakiri =

Malaysian footballer

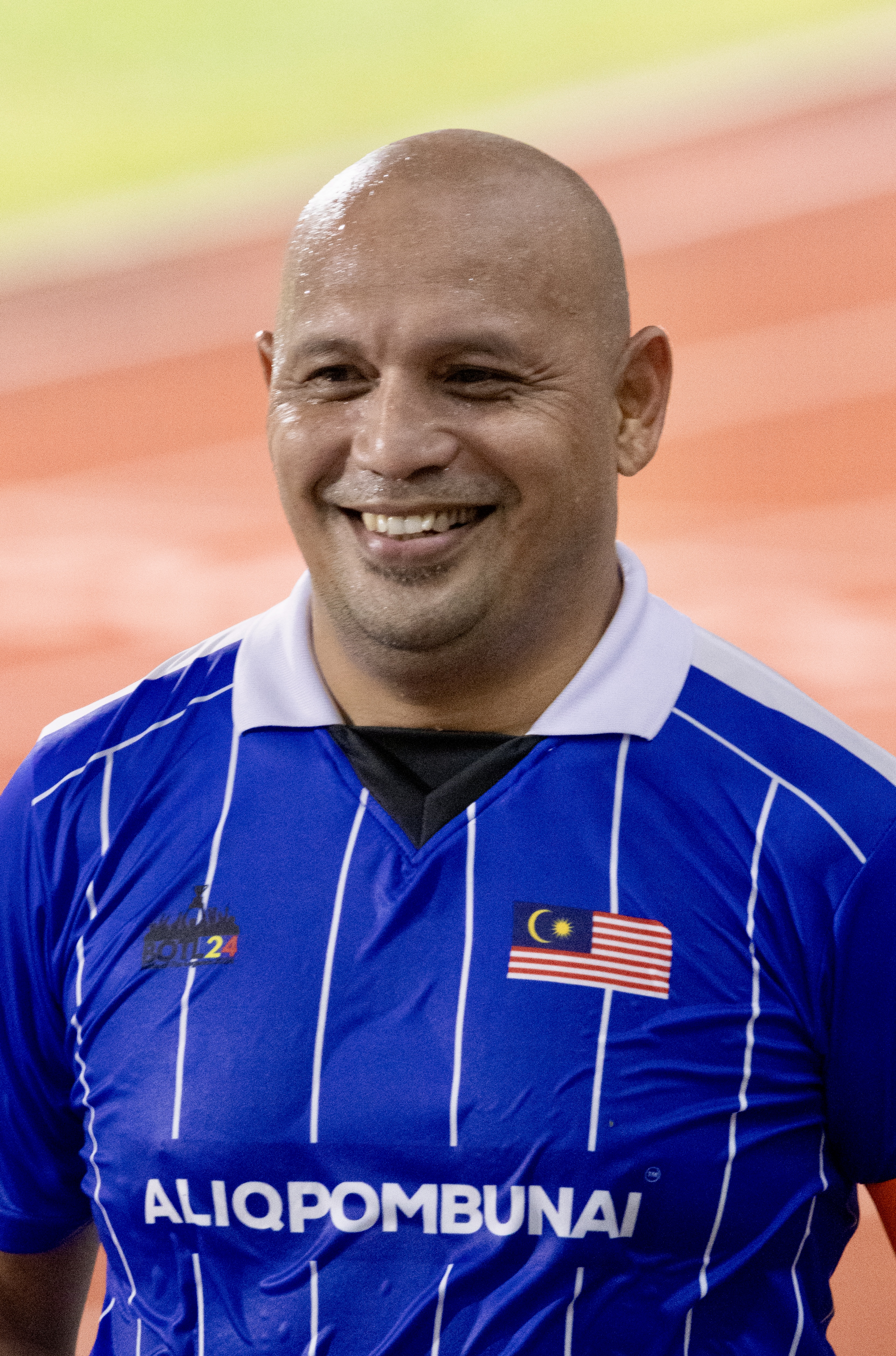
- Asmawi in 2024

Personal information
- Full name: Asmawi bin Bakiri
- Date of birth: 10 September 1974 (age 52)
- Place of birth: Shah Alam, Malaysia
- Height: 1.75 m (5 ft 9 in)
- Positions: Centre back; midfielder

Youth career
- 1992–1994: Selangor President's Cup

Senior career*
Years	Team	Apps	(Gls)
1995–1998	Selangor		
1999	Penang		
2000	Sabah		
2001	Selangor		
2002–2003	Sabah		
2004	Perak		
2005–2006	MPPJ		
2007–2008	Shahzan Muda		

International career
1993–1994	Malaysia U-23	3	(0)
1999	Malaysia	6	(1)
- * Club domestic league appearances and goals

Asmawi Bakiri (born 10 September 1974) is a former Malaysian footballer. He is also a writer and sports commentator for Malaysia television Astro Arena.

== Career ==
=== Club ===
In the early 90s, Asmawi made his debut in the Malaysian League with Selangor President's Cup team. His first goal for Selangor was in the 1997 FA Cup quarter final 2-2 draw against Kelantan at Kota Bahru. He won three Malaysia Cup with Selangor from 1995 until 1997. He move to Penang in 1999 but only stay for one season. On the next season he move to Sabah before returning to Selangor. On 4 August 2001, he played in 2001 Sultan of Selangor Cup. In 2002 until 2003 he played for Sabah and help them reaching back to back Malaysia Cup final but only finished as the runners up. In 2004 he played for Perak and won the Malaysia FA Cup.

=== International ===
In 1993 while playing for Selangor in the President's Cup, Asmawi was called up with the national under 23 team for a training stint in Sri Lanka. In 1994 he played all matches of the Dunhill Cup against Japan U-23, Denmark U-21 and Norway U-21. Under Abdul Rahman Ibrahim, he made his senior international debut in a 2-1 win over New Zealand on 1 July 1999. His only international goal is against Brunei at the 1999 Southeast Asian Games where Malaysia won 2-0.

== Honours ==
Selangor

- Malaysia Cup: 1995, 1996, 1997
- Malaysia Charity Shield: 1996
- Malaysia FA Cup: 1997

Perak

- Malaysia FA Cup: 2004
