= Phạm Như Thuần =

Vietnamese footballer

Personal information
- Full name: Phạm Như Thuần
- Date of birth: October 22, 1975 (age 51)
- Place of birth: Thanh Hóa, Vietnam
- Height: 1.76 m (5 ft 9 in)
- Position: Center back

Youth career
- 1992-1997: Thanh Hoá

Senior career*
Years	Team	Apps	(Gls)
1998–2005	Thể Công	129	(8)
2005-2009	Hà Nội	62	(3)
2009	Khatoco Khánh Hòa	7	(1)
Total		198	(12)

International career
1999–2002	Vietnam	8	(1)

Managerial career
- 2015–2016: Than Quảng Ninh
- * Club domestic league appearances and goals

Phạm Như Thuần is a Vietnamese pundit and former player.

== International goals ==
#	Date	Venue	Opponent	Score	Result	Competition
1.	23 January 2000	Thống Nhất Stadium, Ho Chi Minh City, Vietnam	Guam	1–0	11–0	2000 AFC Asian Cup qualification
