= Triệu Quang Hà =

Vietnamese footballer (born 1975)

Personal information
- Date of birth: 3 September 1975 (age 51)
- Place of birth: Vĩnh Lộc, Thanh Hóa, Vietnam
- Height: 1.72 m (5 ft 8 in)
- Position: Midfielder

Youth career
- 1986–1993: Thể Công

Senior career*
Years	Team	Apps	(Gls)
1994–2004	Thể Công	72	(21)

International career
1997–2002	Vietnam	42	(2)

Managerial career
- 2013–2014: Sài Gòn
- * Club domestic league appearances and goals

Triệu Quang Hà (born 9 September 1975) is a Vietnamese football manager and former player who last managed Sài Gòn.

== Early life ==
Triệu was born on 9 September 1975 in Vĩnh Lộc, Thanh Hóa, Vietnam. Starting playing football at the age of eight, his father encouraged him to play football.

== Club career ==
Triệu spent his entire playing career with Vietnamese side Viettel, helping the club win the league title. Vietnamese newspaper Thanh Niên wrote in 2020 that he "gradually rose up and became an indispensable factor on the right wing of the army team. He tirelessly attacked and defended, leaving a strong impression in the hearts of fans with accurate passes from the right wing" while playing for them.

== International career ==
Triệu was a Vietnam international and played for the Vietnam national team at the 1997 SEA Games, the 1998 AFF Championship, the 1998 Asian Games, the 1999 SEA Games, the 2000 AFF Championship, and the 2002 AFF Championship. During the middle to late 1990s and early 2000s, he was regarded as part of the "golden generation" for the Vietnam national team.
