= Thawatchai Damrong-Ongtrakul =

Thai footballer (born 1974)

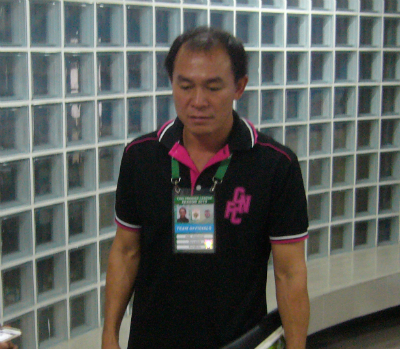

Personal information
- Full name: Thawatchai Damrong-Ongtrakul
- Date of birth: 25 June 1974 (age 52)
- Place of birth: Krabi, Thailand
- Height: 1.68 m (5 ft 6 in)
- Positions: Winger; attacking midfielder

Youth career
- 1987–1989: Ammartpanichnukul School
- 1990–1992: Bangkok Christian College

Senior career*
Years	Team	Apps	(Gls)
1993–1999	Osotsapa	217	(59)
1999–2001	Sembawang Rangers	23	(6)
2002	Tanjong Pagar United	19	(2)
2003–2005	Osotspa	27	(1)
2006	Đồng Nai	11	(0)
2007	Osotsapa	8	(0)
2008	Police United	1	(0)
2009	Krabi	3	(0)
Total		309	(68)

International career
1993–2004	Thailand	73	(10)

Managerial career
- 2009: Chiangrai United
- 2010: Pattaya United
- 2011–2014: Police United
- 2014: Bangkok United
- 2014: Police United
- 2015: Chainat Hornbill
- 2016: Nakhon Pathom United
- 2017–2021: PT Prachuap
- 2021–2022: Nongbua Pitchaya
- 2023: PT Prachuap
- 2024: Police Tero
- 2024–2025: Chonburi
- 2025–: Thailand U23
Medal record
Representing Thailand
SEA Games
Gold medal – first place	Chiang Mai 1995	Team
Gold medal – first place	Jakarta 1997	Team
Gold medal – first place	Bandar Seri Begawan 1999	Team
- * Club domestic league appearances and goals

Thawatchai Damrong-Ongtrakul (Thai: ธวัชชัย ดำรงค์อ่องตระกูล; RTGS: Thawatchai Damrong-ongtrakun; born 25 June 1974) is a Thai football manager and former professional football player, who is the head coach of Thailand U23.

== Playing career ==
He played as a winger and an attacking midfielder. He played for the national team from 1993 to 2004, scoring 10 goals.

On 14 December 1998, he scored the winning goal against South Korea at the 1998 Asian Games on home soil.

== Managerial career ==
=== Police Tero ===
On 20 June 2024, Thawatchai was appointed head coach of Thai League 2 side Police Tero.

== International goals ==
#	Date	Venue	Opponent	Score	Result	Competition
1.	7 October 1994	Hiroshima, Japan	Uzbekistan	4-5	Lost	1994 Asian Games
2.	16 February 1996	Bangkok, Thailand	Finland	5-2	Win	1996 King's Cup
3.	29 June 1996	Bangkok, Thailand	Myanmar	5-1	Won	1996 AFC Asian Cup qualification
4.	4 December 1998	Bangkok, Thailand	Oman	2-0	Won	1998 Asian Games
5.	14 December 1998	Bangkok, Thailand	South Korea	2-1	Won	1998 Asian Games
6.	12 August 1999	Bandar Seri Begawan, Brunei	Singapore	2-0	Won	1999 Southeast Asian Games
7.	14 August 1999	Bandar Seri Begawan, Brunei	Vietnam	2-0	Won	1999 Southeast Asian Games
8.	4 April 2000	Bangkok, Thailand	North Korea	5-3	Won	2000 AFC Asian Cup qualification
9.	6 April 2000	Bangkok, Thailand	Taiwan	1-0	Won	2000 AFC Asian Cup qualification
10.	13 May 2001	Bangkok, Thailand	Sri Lanka	4-2	Won	2002 FIFA World Cup qualification

== Managerial statistics ==
As of match played 14 November 2026

Managerial record by team and tenure
Team	Nat.	From	To	Record					Ref.
Team	Nat.	From	To	G	W	D	L	Win %	Ref.
Police United	(Thailand)	12 February 2011	30 November 2013	32	9	11	12	28.13	
Bangkok United	(Thailand)	1 April 2014	24 June 2014	11	4	2	5	36.36	
Police United	(Thailand)	25 June 2014	31 August 2014	8	0	5	3	0.00	
Chainat Hornbill	(Thailand)	1 November 2014	30 November 2015	28	6	9	13	21.43	
PT Prachuap	(Thailand)	21 June 2017	30 March 2021	108	42	25	41	38.89	
Nongbua Pitchaya	(Thailand)	4 May 2021	2 November 2022	47	18	9	20	38.30	
PT Prachuap	(Thailand)	27 August 2023	1 October 2023	4	0	1	3	0.00	
Police Tero	(Thailand)	20 June 2024	26 November 2024	16	4	6	6	25.00	
Chonburi	(Thailand)	28 December 2024	4 May 2025	18	11	3	4	61.11	
Thailand U23	(Thailand)	27 June 2025	Present	29	12	8	9	41.38	
Career Total				301	106	79	116	35.22	

== Honours ==
=== Manager ===
PT Prachuap

- Thai League Cup: 2019

Chonburi

- Thai League 2: 2024–25

Thailand U23

- SEA Games silver medalist: 2025

Individual

- Thai League 1 Coach of the Month: May 2018
- Thai League 2 Manager of the Month: March 2025
- Thai League 2 Coach of the Year: 2024–25
