= Nguyễn Thiện Quang =

Vietnamese footballer (born 1970)

Nguyễn Thiện Quang (born 1970) is a Vietnamese former footballer who played as a defender. He was described as "an excellent midfielder in Vietnamese football". Discussing his "way of tackling the ball" His style of play was described as "kind of ... gentle, not malicious".

Quang grew up in Haiphong, Vietnam.

He is married and has two children.
