= Jatupong Thongsukh =

Thai footballer (born 1976)

Personal information
- Full name: Jatupong Thongsukh
- Date of birth: January 12, 1976 (age 50)
- Place of birth: Loei, Thailand
- Height: 1.69 m (5 ft 6 1/2 in)
- Positions: Striker; second striker

Youth career
- 1995–1997: Raj Vithi

Senior career*
Years	Team	Apps	(Gls)
1998–2002	Raj Vithi	42	(13)
2002–2008	BEC Tero Sasana	94	(39)
2008	Muang Thong United	1	(0)
2009	Chula United	17	(3)
2010	Roi Et United	15	(6)
Total		169	(61)

International career
1999–2002	Thailand	15	(2)

Managerial career
- 2021–: STK Muangnont
- * Club domestic league appearances and goals as of 17 July 2010

Jatupong Thongsukh (born January 12, 1976, (Thai: จตุพงษ์ ทองสุข, RTGS: Chatuphong Thongsuk) is a Thai retired footballer. He scored two goals for the national team. Currently, he is a teacher at Chulalongkorn University Demonstration Secondary School, also coaching the school football team. He is currently the manager of STK Muangnont.

== International goals ==
#	Date	Venue	Opponent	Score	Result	Competition
1.	August 8, 1999	Bandar Seri Begawan, Brunei	Myanmar	7-0	Won	1999 Southeast Asian Games
2.	August 8, 1999	Bandar Seri Begawan, Brunei	Myanmar	7-0	Won	1999 Southeast Asian Games
