= Berakas Sports Complex =

Sport complex in Bandar Seri Begawan, Brunei

Berakas Sport Complex
- Kompleks Sukan Berakas
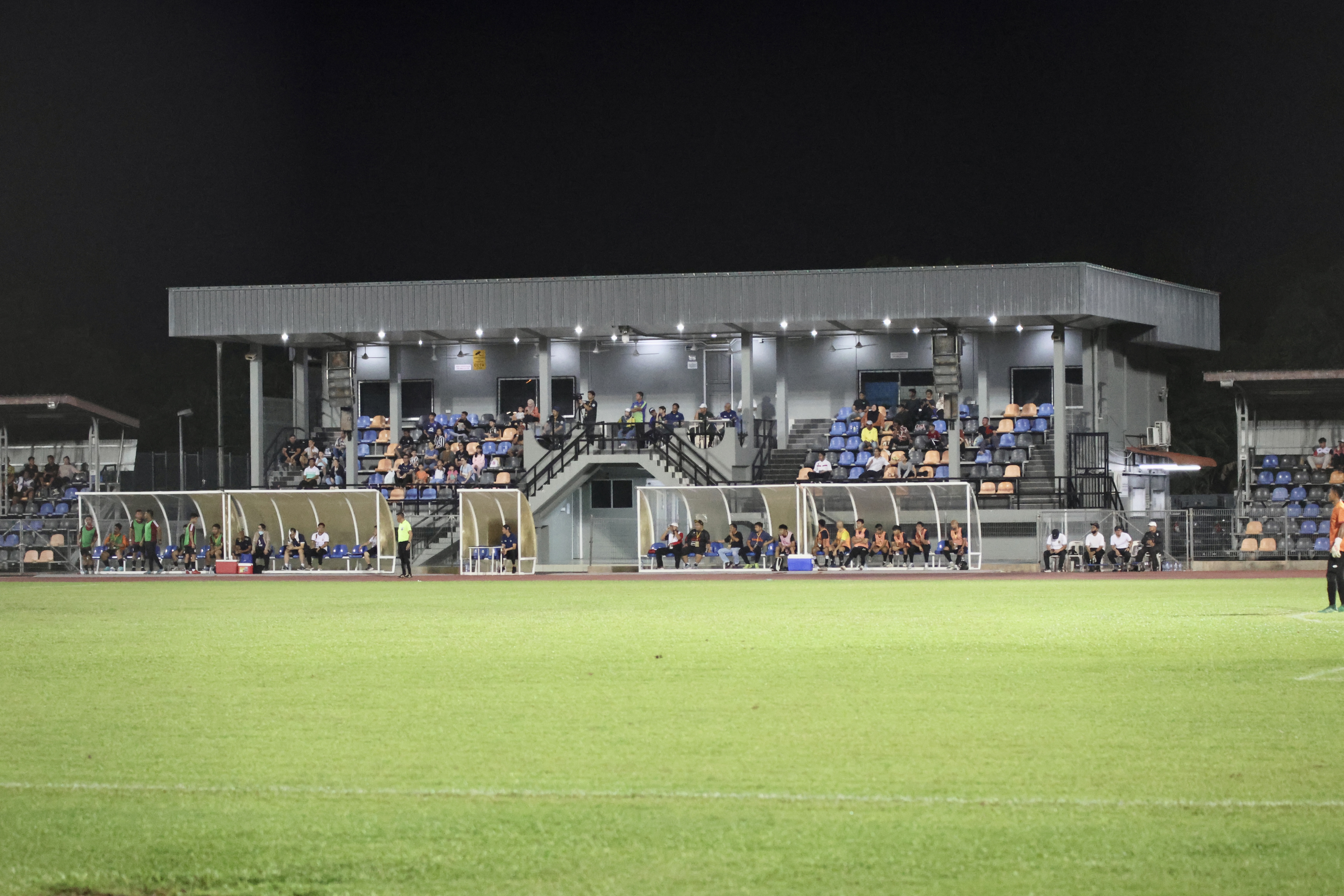
- The football pitch at night in 2023
- Interactive map of Berakas Sport Complex
- Address: Jalan Padang Kebajikan; Bandar Seri Begawan, BB3513; Brunei
- Coordinates: 4.9369°N 114.9400°E
- Owner: Department of Youth and Sports (Note: The Ministry of Culture, Youth and Sports's Department of Youth and Sports is in charge of overseeing the nation's sport facilities.)
- Capacity: 700
- Type: Sports complex
- Surface: Grass

Tenant
- Brunei national football team

Berakas Sports Complex (BSC; Malay: Kompleks Sukan Berakas) is a multi-purpose stadium located in Kampong Jaya Setia, Bandar Seri Begawan, Brunei. Primarily used for football matches, track and field events, and other tournaments, the stadium has a seating capacity of 700. Other names for the football field are Padang Kebajikan and Kompleks Sukan Padang Kebajikan Berakas.

== Notable events ==
- Brunei FA Cup (2016; 2017–18; 2018–19; 2022)
- Brunei Premier League (2007–08; 2009–10; 2011; 2014; 2015; 2016; 2017; 2018–19)
- Brunei Super League (2015; 2016; 2021; 2023; 2024–25)
- Hassanal Bolkiah Trophy (2005; 2007; 2012; 2014)
- SEA Games (1999)

== Facilities ==
The Berakas Sports Complex offers seating for 700 spectators and includes a range of facilities. It has two football pitches, known as Football Field A and Football Field B, as well as a track and field area. Additionally, the complex features three open-air courts, consisting of two futsal arenas and one netball arena, providing a variety of options for sports and recreational activities.
