= List of Indonesian football competitions all-time top scorers =

This table presents the list of top scorers in Indonesian football competitions, in particular since the establishment of Liga Indonesia in 1994, during their all-time career in Indonesia. In the period of 1994–2007 the top flight league in Indonesia was the Premier Division which was then replaced by Indonesia Super League and later became Liga 1, but reverted to Super League.

== Top scorers by season ==
Season	Player	Club	Goals	Apps	Ratio
1994–95	(Indonesia) Peri Sandria	Bandung Raya	34		
1995–96	(Serbia) Dejan Gluščević	Bandung Raya	30		
1996–97	(Brazil) Jacksen F. Tiago	Persebaya Surabaya	26		
1997–98	(Indonesia) Kurniawan Dwi Yulianto	Pelita Jaya	20		
1998–99	(Gabon) Alain Mabenda	PSDS Deli Serdang	11		
1999–2000	(Indonesia) Bambang Pamungkas	Persija Jakarta	24	30	0.8
2001	(Cameroon) Sadissou Bako	Barito Putera	22		
2002	(Indonesia) Ilham Jaya Kesuma	Persita Tangerang	26	29	0.9
2003	(Chile) Oscar Aravena	PSM Makassar	31		
2004	(Indonesia) Ilham Jaya Kesuma (2)	Persita Tangerang	22	25	0.88
2005	(Uruguay) Cristian Gonzáles	Persik Kediri	25	30	0.83
2006	(Uruguay) Cristian Gonzáles (2)	Persik Kediri	29	28	1.04
2007–08	(Uruguay) Cristian Gonzáles (3)	Persik Kediri	32	25	1.28
2008–09	(Indonesia) Boaz Solossa	Persipura Jayapura	28	31	0.9
2008–09	(Uruguay) Cristian Gonzáles (4)	Persik Kediri / Persib Bandung	28	28	1
2009–10	(Paraguay) Aldo Barreto	Bontang	19	32	0.59
2010–11	(Indonesia) Boaz Solossa (2)	Persipura Jayapura	22	27	0.81
2011–12	(Brazil) Alberto Gonçalves	Persipura Jayapura	25	34	0.74
2013	(Indonesia) Boaz Solossa (3)	Persipura Jayapura	25	32	0.78
2014	(Cameroon) Emmanuel Kenmogne	Persebaya ISL (Bhayangkara)	25	25	1
2017	(Netherlands) Sylvano Comvalius	Bali United	37	34	1.09
2018	(Serbia) Aleksandar Rakić	PS TIRA	21	34	0.62
2019	(Croatia) Marko Šimić	Persija Jakarta	28	32	0.88
2021–22	(Indonesia) Ilija Spasojević	Bali United	23	34	0.68
2022–23	(Brazil) Matheus Pato	Borneo Samarinda	25	32	0.78
2023–24	(Brazil) David da Silva	Persib Bandung	30	34	0.88
2024–25	(Brazil) Alex Martins	Dewa United	26	25	1.04
2025–26	(Brazil) David da Silva	Malut United	23	34	0.68

Note

1. At the time of the abandonment.
2. They were not naturalized as an Indonesian citizens at that time.

== All-time top scorers ==
As of matches played on 23 May 2026

Players in bold are still active in Super League.

Rank	Player	Goals	Apps	Ratio	Years	Club(s)
1	(Uruguay) (Indonesia) Cristian Gonzáles	269	392	0.69	2003–2018	PSM, Persik, Persib, Persisam Putra, Arema, Madura United
2	(Indonesia) Boaz Solossa	185	337	0.55	2005–	Persipura Jayapura, Borneo, PSS
3	(Indonesia) Bambang Pamungkas	178	377	0.47	1999–2005, 2007–2019	Persija Jakarta, Pelita Bandung Raya
4	(Brazil) (Indonesia) Alberto Gonçalves	176	310	0.57	2009–2014, 2016–2021, 2022–	Persijap, Persipura, Arema, Sriwijaya, Madura United
5	(Indonesia) Kurniawan Dwi Yulianto	162	292	0.55	1997–2005, 2006–2010	Pelita Bakrie, PSM, PSPS Pekanbaru, Persebaya, Persija, PSS; Persitara, Persela
6	(Indonesia) Aliyudin	133	321	0.41	2000–2016	Pelita Krakatau Steel, Persikota Tangerang, Persija, Persib, Sriwijaya, Persikabo
7	(Brazil) **David da Silva**	127	178	0.71	2018, 2019–2020, 2021–	Persebaya, Persib, Malut United
8	(Brazil) Hilton Moreira	117	270	0.43	2005–2006, 2007–2013, 2016–2018	Deltras, Persib, Sriwijaya, Persipura
9	(Indonesia) Ilham Jaya Kesuma	111	206	0.54	1996–2006, 2007–2012	Persita, Persisam Putra, Mitra Kukar
10	(Chile) Julio Lopez	110	192	0.57	2001–2003, 2007–2013	PSIS, Persib, PSM, Persiba, Persisam Putra, Persijap, Persikabo
