= 1996 Liga Indonesia Premier Division final =

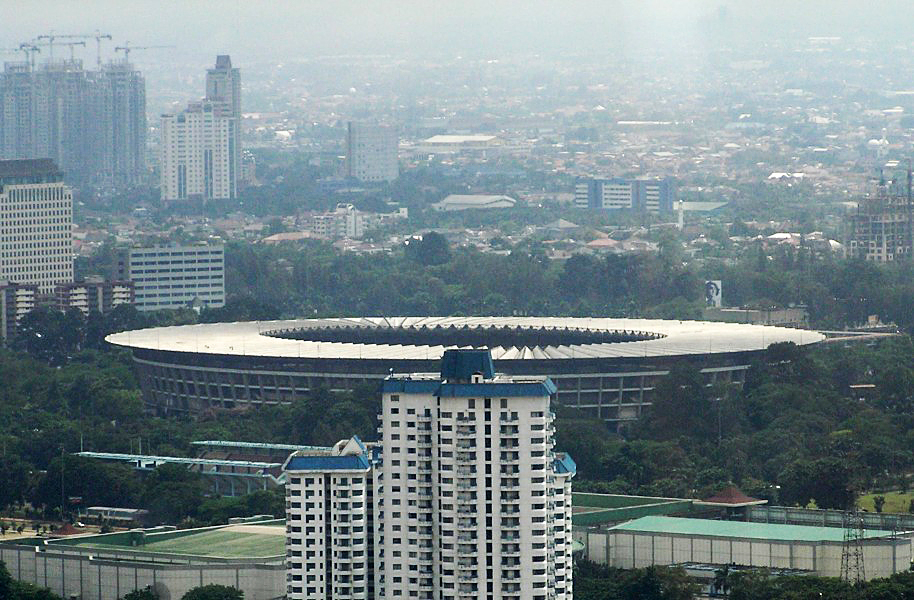
- The final was played at Gelora Senayan Main Stadium.
- Event: 1995–96 Liga Indonesia Premier Division
PSM Makassar	Bandung Raya
0	2
- Date: 6 October 1996
- Venue: Gelora Senayan Main Stadium, Jakarta
- Referee: Yana Yoshihogu Katayama (Japan)
- Attendance: 50,000
- Weather: Fine

The 1996 Liga Indonesia Premier Division final was a football match which was played on 6 October 1996 at Gelora Senayan Main Stadium in Jakarta. It was contested by PSM and Bandung Raya to determine the winner of the 1995–96 Liga Indonesia Premier Division. Bandung Raya won the match 2–0 to claim their first-ever title.

== Road to the final ==
PSM Makassar		Round	Bandung Raya	
Main article: 1995–96 Liga Indonesia Premier Division first stage: East Region: Pos / Team / Pld / W / D / L / GF / GA / GD / Pts; 1 / PSM / 30 / 17 / 6 / 7 / 58 / 26 / +32 / 57; 2 / Mitra Surabaya / 30 / 15 / 9 / 6 / 49 / 31 / +18 / 54; 3 / Pupuk Kaltim / 30 / 16 / 7 / 7 / 56 / 31 / +25 / 52; 4 / Gelora Dewata / 30 / 14 / 8 / 8 / 47 / 27 / +20 / 50; 5 / Persipura / 30 / 14 / 7 / 9 / 47 / 32 / +15 / 49; 6 / Putra Samarinda / 30 / 14 / 6 / 10 / 44 / 39 / +5 / 48; 7 / Persebaya / 30 / 12 / 11 / 7 / 45 / 35 / +10 / 47; 8 / Petrokimia Putra / 30 / 13 / 6 / 11 / 47 / 34 / +13 / 45; 9 / Assyabaab SGS / 30 / 12 / 4 / 14 / 38 / 48 / −10 / 40; 10 / PSIS / 30 / 10 / 7 / 13 / 37 / 41 / −4 / 37; 11 / Persma / 30 / 11 / 7 / 12 / 31 / 46 / −15 / 37; 12 / Arema / 30 / 8 / 11 / 11 / 19 / 25 / −6 / 35; 13 / Persema / 30 / 8 / 7 / 15 / 26 / 55 / −29 / 31; 14 / Persiba / 30 / 8 / 5 / 17 / 24 / 43 / −19 / 29; 15 / Barito Putera / 30 / 9 / 5 / 16 / 22 / 42 / −20 / 29; 16 / Persegres / 30 / 3 / 6 / 21 / 23 / 58 / −35 / 15; Source: RSSSF		First stage	Main article: 1995–96 Liga Indonesia Premier Division first stage: West Region: Pos / Team / Pld / W / D / L / GF / GA / GD / Pts; 1 / Bandung Raya / 28 / 18 / 7 / 3 / 57 / 17 / +40 / 61; 2 / Pelita Jaya / 28 / 16 / 7 / 5 / 47 / 21 / +26 / 55; 3 / Persib / 28 / 13 / 11 / 4 / 31 / 15 / +16 / 50; 4 / Persita / 28 / 13 / 8 / 7 / 41 / 26 / +15 / 47; 5 / Persikab / 28 / 13 / 6 / 9 / 41 / 27 / +14 / 45; 6 / Mataram Indocement / 28 / 12 / 9 / 7 / 32 / 27 / +5 / 45; 7 / Persiraja / 28 / 11 / 10 / 7 / 35 / 24 / +11 / 43; 8 / PSDS / 28 / 7 / 13 / 8 / 25 / 26 / −1 / 34; 9 / Semen Padang / 28 / 9 / 5 / 14 / 32 / 33 / −1 / 32; 10 / Medan Jaya / 28 / 8 / 8 / 12 / 22 / 30 / −8 / 32; 11 / PSMS / 28 / 6 / 10 / 12 / 15 / 30 / −15 / 28; 12 / Persijatim / 28 / 7 / 6 / 15 / 22 / 54 / −32 / 27; 13 / Arseto / 28 / 5 / 9 / 14 / 17 / 39 / −22 / 24; 14 / Persija Jakarta / 28 / 5 / 8 / 15 / 17 / 39 / −22 / 23; 15 / BPD Jateng / 28 / 5 / 7 / 16 / 27 / 53 / −26 / 22; 16 / Persiku / 0 / 0 / 0 / 0 / 0 / 0 / 0 / 0; Source: RSSSF	
Main article: 1995–96 Liga Indonesia Premier Division second stage: Group C: Pos / Team / Pld / W / D / L / GF / GA / GD / Pts; 1 / PSM / 3 / 3 / 0 / 0 / 3 / 0 / +3 / 9; 2 / Persipura / 3 / 2 / 0 / 1 / 6 / 2 / +4 / 6; 3 / Persib / 3 / 1 / 0 / 2 / 3 / 3 / 0 / 3; 4 / Mataram Indocement / 3 / 0 / 0 / 3 / 0 / 7 / −7 / 0; Source: RSSSF		Second stage	Main article: 1995–96 Liga Indonesia Premier Division second stage: Group A: Pos / Team / Pld / W / D / L / GF / GA / GD / Pts; 1 / Bandung Raya / 3 / 3 / 0 / 0 / 9 / 1 / +8 / 9; 2 / Persikab / 3 / 1 / 1 / 1 / 4 / 4 / 0 / 4; 3 / Pupuk Kaltim / 3 / 1 / 0 / 2 / 1 / 4 / −3 / 3; 4 / Putra Samarinda / 3 / 0 / 1 / 2 / 2 / 7 / −5 / 1; Source: RSSSF	
Opponent	Result	Knockout stage	Opponent	Result
Persipura	4–3	Semifinals	Mitra Surabaya	0–0 (4–2 pen.)

== Match details ==
6 October 1996
17:30 WIB

PSM	0–2	Bandung Raya
	Report	Peri 3'; Rafni 11'

Gelora Senayan Main Stadium, Jakarta
Attendance: 50,000
Referee: Yana Yoshihogu Katayama (Japan)

PSM

Bandung Raya

PSM:
GK	1	(Indonesia) Ansar Abdullah
CB	2	(Brazil) Marcio Novo
CB	5	(Indonesia) Yeyen Tumena (c)
CB	8	(Indonesia) Ali Baba
RWB	23	(Indonesia) Ronny Ririn	(substituted off) 45'
CM	10	(Brazil) Luciano Leandro
CM	11	(Indonesia) Ayub Khan
CM	14	(Indonesia) Ansar Razak
LWB	6	(Indonesia) Syamsuddin Batolla
FW	17	(Indonesia) Yusuf Ekodono	(substituted off) 71'
FW	18	(Brazil) Jacksen Tiago
Substitutes:
GK	20	(Indonesia) Agus Setiawan
DF	3	(Indonesia) Bahar Muharam
MF	12	(Indonesia) Yuniarto Budi	(substituted on) 71'
MF	16	(Indonesia) Arif Kamaruddin	(substituted on) 45'
FW	9	(Indonesia) Rachman Usman
Head coach:
(Indonesia) Muhammad Basri

Bandung Raya:
GK	1	(Indonesia) Hermansyah
CB	4	(Indonesia) Hendriawan
CB	19	(Indonesia) Nur'alim
CB	20	(Cameroon) Olinga Atangana
RWB	11	(Indonesia) Surya Lesmana
CM	2	(Indonesia) Muhammad Ramdan
CM	10	(Indonesia) Ajat Sudrajat (c)
CM	17	(Indonesia) Alexander Saununu	(substituted off) 78'
LWB	22	(Indonesia) Budiman Yunus
CF	8	(Indonesia) Peri Sandria	(substituted off) 85'
CF	9	(Indonesia) Rafni Kotari	(substituted off) 67'
Substitutes:
GK	25	(Indonesia) Udin Rafiudin
DF	3	(Indonesia) Rasyito Amsyah
MF	14	(Indonesia) Makmun Adnan	(substituted on) 67'
MF	15	(Indonesia) Herry Kiswanto	(substituted on) 78'
FW	6	(Indonesia) Rehmalem	(substituted on) 85'
Head coach:
(Netherlands) Henk Wullems

== See also ==
- 1995–96 Liga Indonesia Premier Division
