= 1995 Liga Indonesia Premier Division final =

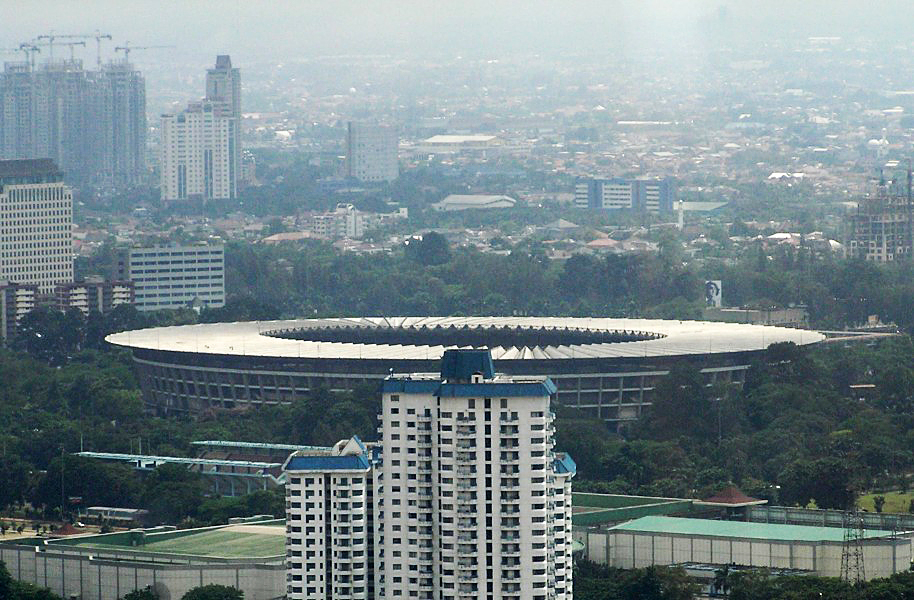
- The final was played at Gelora Senayan Main Stadium.
- Event: 1994–95 Liga Indonesia Premier Division
Petrokimia Putra	Persib
0	1
- Date: 30 July 1995
- Venue: Gelora Senayan Main Stadium, Jakarta
- Referee: Zulkifli Chaniago (Bengkulu)
- Attendance: 120,000
- Weather: Fine

The 1995 Liga Indonesia Premier Division final was a football match that took place on 30 July 1995 at Gelora Senayan Main Stadium in Jakarta. It was contested by Petrokimia Putra and Persib to determine the inaugural winner of the Premier Division. Persib won the match 1–0 with the goal scored by Sutiono Lamso in the 76th minute for their first-ever professional title. For winning the title, Persib gained entry to the 1995 Asian Club Championship. Meanwhile, Petrokimia Putra gained entry to the 1995 Asian Cup Winners' Cup as runners-up.

== Road to the final ==
Petrokimia Putra		Round	Persib	
Main article: 1994–95 Liga Indonesia Premier Division first stage: East Region: Pos / Team / Pld / W / D / L / GF / GA / GD / Pts; 1 / Petrokimia Putra / 32 / 17 / 9 / 6 / 62 / 31 / +31 / 60; 2 / Pupuk Kaltim / 32 / 15 / 12 / 5 / 58 / 27 / +31 / 57; 3 / ASGS / 32 / 17 / 6 / 9 / 57 / 45 / +12 / 57; 4 / Barito Putera / 32 / 17 / 5 / 10 / 51 / 31 / +20 / 56; 5 / Gelora Dewata / 32 / 15 / 9 / 8 / 50 / 27 / +23 / 54; 6 / Arema / 32 / 15 / 7 / 10 / 44 / 41 / +3 / 52; 7 / Mitra Surabaya / 32 / 15 / 5 / 12 / 45 / 34 / +11 / 50; 8 / Persipura / 32 / 13 / 9 / 10 / 40 / 42 / −2 / 48; 9 / Persebaya / 32 / 12 / 10 / 10 / 45 / 40 / +5 / 46; 10 / PSM / 32 / 11 / 10 / 11 / 31 / 32 / −1 / 43; 11 / Putra Samarinda / 32 / 11 / 8 / 13 / 32 / 41 / −9 / 41; 12 / Persema / 32 / 11 / 6 / 15 / 33 / 43 / −10 / 39; 13 / PSIS / 32 / 10 / 9 / 13 / 28 / 43 / −15 / 39; 14 / Persegres / 32 / 8 / 8 / 16 / 33 / 49 / −16 / 32; 15 / Persiba / 32 / 8 / 6 / 18 / 26 / 49 / −23 / 30; 16 / PSIR / 32 / 5 / 9 / 18 / 26 / 52 / −26 / 21 (Note: PSIR were docked three points for walking out of a match against PSIM on 1 June 1995.); 17 / PSIM / 32 / 2 / 12 / 18 / 14 / 48 / −34 / 18; Source: RSSSF; Notes:		First stage	Main article: 1994–95 Liga Indonesia Premier Division first stage: West Region: Pos / Team / Pld / W / D / L / GF / GA / GD / Pts; 1 / Pelita Jaya / 32 / 24 / 5 / 3 / 78 / 25 / +53 / 77; 2 / Persib / 32 / 20 / 9 / 3 / 54 / 15 / +39 / 69; 3 / Bandung Raya / 32 / 19 / 10 / 3 / 68 / 26 / +42 / 67; 4 / Medan Jaya / 32 / 15 / 11 / 6 / 46 / 29 / +17 / 56; 5 / Semen Padang / 32 / 14 / 10 / 8 / 45 / 25 / +20 / 52; 6 / Persiraja / 32 / 14 / 10 / 8 / 37 / 41 / −4 / 52; 7 / Arseto / 32 / 14 / 6 / 12 / 46 / 38 / +8 / 48; 8 / Persita / 32 / 13 / 6 / 13 / 43 / 41 / +2 / 45; 9 / PSMS Medan / 32 / 11 / 8 / 13 / 37 / 36 / +1 / 41; 10 / PSDS / 32 / 10 / 11 / 11 / 38 / 45 / −7 / 41; 11 / Mataram Putra / 32 / 11 / 6 / 15 / 24 / 31 / −7 / 39; 12 / Persiku / 32 / 10 / 7 / 15 / 30 / 37 / −7 / 37; 13 / Persija / 32 / 11 / 5 / 16 / 42 / 51 / −9 / 35 (Note: Persija were docked three points for walking out of a match against Bandung Raya on 1 June 1995.); 14 / BPD Jateng / 32 / 8 / 10 / 14 / 42 / 50 / −8 / 34; 15 / Persijatim / 32 / 6 / 6 / 20 / 29 / 71 / −42 / 24; 16 / PS Bengkulu / 32 / 5 / 5 / 22 / 28 / 69 / −41 / 20; 17 / Warna Agung / 32 / 2 / 5 / 25 / 24 / 81 / −57 / 11; Source: RSSSF; Notes:	
Main article: 1994–95 Liga Indonesia Premier Division second stage: Group B: Pos / Team / Pld / W / D / L / GF / GA / GD / Pts; 1 / Persib / 3 / 2 / 1 / 0 / 5 / 1 / +4 / 7; 2 / Petrokimia Putra / 3 / 1 / 2 / 0 / 5 / 2 / +3 / 5; 3 / ASGS / 3 / 1 / 1 / 1 / 4 / 6 / −2 / 4; 4 / Medan Jaya / 3 / 0 / 0 / 3 / 2 / 7 / −5 / 0; Source: RSSSF		Second stage	Main article: 1994–95 Liga Indonesia Premier Division second stage: Group B: Pos / Team / Pld / W / D / L / GF / GA / GD / Pts; 1 / Persib / 3 / 2 / 1 / 0 / 5 / 1 / +4 / 7; 2 / Petrokimia Putra / 3 / 1 / 2 / 0 / 5 / 2 / +3 / 5; 3 / ASGS / 3 / 1 / 1 / 1 / 4 / 6 / −2 / 4; 4 / Medan Jaya / 3 / 0 / 0 / 3 / 2 / 7 / −5 / 0; Source: RSSSF	
Opponent	Result	Knockout stage	Opponent	Result
Pupuk Kaltim	1–0	Semifinals	Barito Putera	1–0

== Match details ==
30 July 1995
17:30 WIB

Petrokimia Putra	0–1	Persib
	Report	Sutiono 76'

Gelora Senayan Main Stadium, Jakarta
Attendance: 120,000
Referee: Zulkifli Chaniago (Bengkulu)

Petrokimia Putra	Persib

Petrokimia Putra
GK	21	(Trinidad and Tobago) Darryl Sinerine
RB	12	(Indonesia) Lutfi
CB	4	(Indonesia) Sasi Kirono
CB	17	(Indonesia) Setyo Budiarto	(yellow card) 51' (yellow-red card) 53'
CB	13	(Indonesia) Suwandi Siswoyo
LB	3	(Indonesia) Khusaeri (c)
CM	19	(Indonesia) Eri Irianto	(yellow card) 6'
CM	8	(Indonesia) Andi Setiono		(substituted off) 77'
CM	10	(Brazil) Carlos de Mello
RF	7	(Indonesia) Widodo Putro
LF	18	(Brazil) Jacksen Tiago	(yellow card) 44'
Substitutes:
GK	1	(Indonesia) M. Hadi
DF	2	(Indonesia) Arifin		(substituted on) 77'
MF	20	(Indonesia) Zainul Arifin
FW	11	(Indonesia) Kalbaryanto
Head coach:
(Indonesia) Andi Teguh

Persib:
GK	23	(Indonesia) Anwar Sanusi
RWB	3	(Indonesia) Dede Iskandar
CB	12	(Indonesia) Mulyana	(yellow card) 62'
CB	6	(Indonesia) Robby Darwis (c)
CB	15	(Indonesia) Asep Kustiana
LWB	2	(Indonesia) Nanang Kusnaedi
CM	22	(Indonesia) Yadi Mulyadi
CM	5	(Indonesia) Yudi Guntara		(substituted off) 51'
AM	8	(Indonesia) Yusuf Bachtiar
RF	18	(Indonesia) Kekey Zakaria
LF	9	(Indonesia) Sutiono Lamso
Substitutes:
GK	21	(Indonesia) Samai Setiadi
DF	19	(Indonesia) Hendra Komara
DF	13	(Indonesia) Nana Supriatna
MF	4	(Indonesia) Asep Sumantri		(substituted on) 51'
MF	7	(Indonesia) Roy Darwis
FW	10	(Indonesia) Dadang Kurnia
FW	11	(Indonesia) Tatang Suryana
Head coach:
(Indonesia) Indra Thohir

== See also ==
- 1994–95 Liga Indonesia Premier Division
