= 1997 Liga Indonesia Premier Division final =

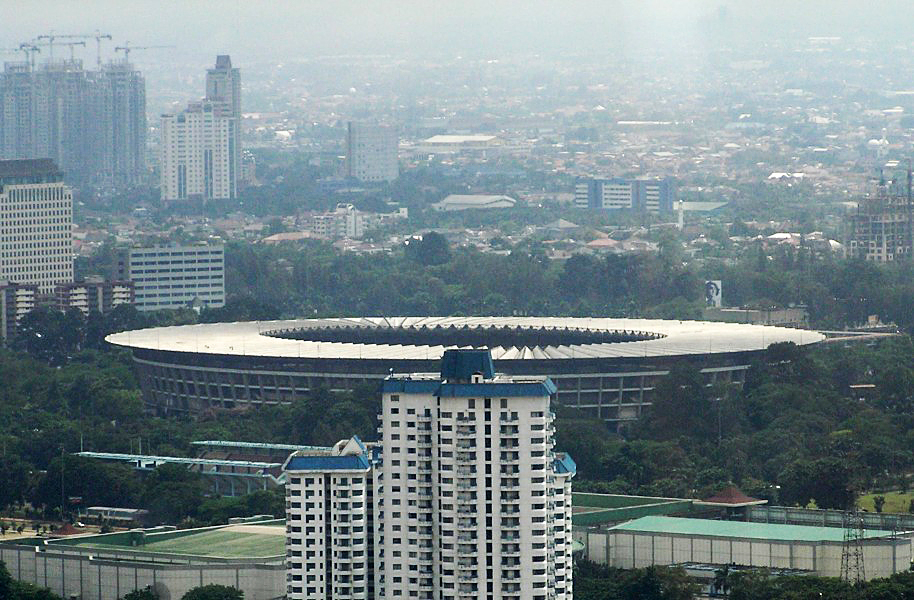
- The final was played at Gelora Senayan Main Stadium.
- Event: 1996–97 Liga Indonesia Premier Division
Persebaya Surabaya	Bandung Raya
3	1
- Date: 28 July 1997
- Venue: Gelora Senayan Main Stadium, Jakarta
- Referee: Kim Dae-hyung (South Korea)
- Weather: Fine

The 1997 Liga Indonesia Premier Division final was a football match which was played on 28 July 1997 at Gelora Senayan Main Stadium in Jakarta. It was contested by Persebaya Surabaya and Bandung Raya to determine the winner of the 1996–97 Liga Indonesia Premier Division. Persebaya won the match 3–1 to claim their first-ever professional title.

== Road to the final ==
Persebaya Surabaya		Round	Bandung Raya	
Main article: 1996–97 Liga Indonesia Premier Division first stage: West Region: Pos / Team / Pld / W / D / L / GF / GA / GD / Pts; 1 / Persebaya Surabaya / 20 / 13 / 4 / 3 / 62 / 18 / +44 / 43; 2 / Bandung Raya / 20 / 11 / 2 / 7 / 30 / 17 / +13 / 35; 3 / Arema Malang / 20 / 10 / 5 / 5 / 26 / 20 / +6 / 35; 4 / Persiraja Banda Aceh / 20 / 10 / 2 / 8 / 23 / 16 / +7 / 32; 5 / Persita Tangerang / 20 / 10 / 2 / 8 / 24 / 22 / +2 / 32; 6 / PSBL Bandar Lampung / 20 / 8 / 7 / 5 / 19 / 16 / +3 / 31; 7 / Semen Padang / 20 / 8 / 6 / 6 / 20 / 17 / +3 / 30; 8 / Persikab Bandung / 20 / 6 / 7 / 7 / 17 / 19 / −2 / 25; 9 / Medan Jaya / 20 / 6 / 7 / 7 / 24 / 25 / −1 / 25; 10 / Persija Jakarta / 20 / 4 / 3 / 13 / 23 / 31 / −8 / 15; 11 / Persijatim / 20 / 0 / 3 / 17 / 8 / 75 / −67 / 3; Source: RSSSF		First stage	Main article: 1996–97 Liga Indonesia Premier Division first stage: West Region: Pos / Team / Pld / W / D / L / GF / GA / GD / Pts; 1 / Persebaya Surabaya / 20 / 13 / 4 / 3 / 62 / 18 / +44 / 43; 2 / Bandung Raya / 20 / 11 / 2 / 7 / 30 / 17 / +13 / 35; 3 / Arema Malang / 20 / 10 / 5 / 5 / 26 / 20 / +6 / 35; 4 / Persiraja Banda Aceh / 20 / 10 / 2 / 8 / 23 / 16 / +7 / 32; 5 / Persita Tangerang / 20 / 10 / 2 / 8 / 24 / 22 / +2 / 32; 6 / PSBL Bandar Lampung / 20 / 8 / 7 / 5 / 19 / 16 / +3 / 31; 7 / Semen Padang / 20 / 8 / 6 / 6 / 20 / 17 / +3 / 30; 8 / Persikab Bandung / 20 / 6 / 7 / 7 / 17 / 19 / −2 / 25; 9 / Medan Jaya / 20 / 6 / 7 / 7 / 24 / 25 / −1 / 25; 10 / Persija Jakarta / 20 / 4 / 3 / 13 / 23 / 31 / −8 / 15; 11 / Persijatim / 20 / 0 / 3 / 17 / 8 / 75 / −67 / 3; Source: RSSSF	
Main article: 1996–97 Liga Indonesia Premier Division second stage: Group A: Pos / Team / Pld / W / D / L / GF / GA / GD / Pts; 1 / Persebaya Surabaya / 3 / 3 / 0 / 0 / 14 / 4 / +10 / 9; 2 / Mitra Surabaya / 3 / 2 / 0 / 1 / 9 / 7 / +2 / 6; 3 / Persiraja Banda Aceh / 3 / 1 / 0 / 2 / 4 / 9 / −5 / 3; 4 / Gelora Dewata / 3 / 0 / 0 / 3 / 3 / 10 / −7 / 0; Source: RSSSF		Second stage	Main article: 1996–97 Liga Indonesia Premier Division second stage: Group B: Pos / Team / Pld / W / D / L / GF / GA / GD / Pts; 1 / Bandung Raya / 3 / 2 / 1 / 0 / 5 / 0 / +5 / 7; 2 / Persib Bandung / 3 / 1 / 2 / 0 / 1 / 0 / +1 / 5; 3 / Persma Manado / 3 / 0 / 2 / 1 / 2 / 5 / −3 / 2; 4 / Barito Putera / 3 / 0 / 1 / 2 / 2 / 5 / −3 / 1; Source: RSSSF	
Opponent	Result	Knockout stage	Opponent	Result
PSM Makassar	3–2	Semifinals	Mitra Surabaya	1–0

== Match details ==
28 July 1997
17:30 WIB

Persebaya Surabaya	3–1	Bandung Raya
Aji 58' (pen.); Tiago 60'; Pieters 80'	Report	Budiman 84'

Gelora Senayan Main Stadium, Jakarta
Referee: Kim Dae-hyung (South Korea)

Persebaya Surabaya
Bandung Raya

Persebaya Surabaya:
GK	21	(Indonesia) Agus Murod
CB	17	(Indonesia) Khairil Anwar
CB	5	(Indonesia) Sugiantoro
CB	16	(Brazil) Justinho Pinhiero
RWB	2	(Indonesia) Anang Ma'ruf
LWB	3	(Indonesia) Aji Santoso (c)
CM	8	(Brazil) Carlos de Mello
CM	12	(Indonesia) Yusuf Ekodono	(substituted off) 43' (yellow card) 43'
CM	9	(Indonesia) Uston Nawawi	(substituted off) 87'
CF	7	(Indonesia) Reinald Pieters
CF	18	(Brazil) Jacksen Tiago
Substitutes:
GK	20	(Indonesia) Dedi Siswanto
MF	11	(Indonesia) Jatmiko	(substituted on) 43'
MF	6	(Indonesia) Mursyid Effendi	(substituted on) 87'
FW	23	(Indonesia) Sutaji
Head Coach:
(Indonesia) Rusdy Bahalwan

Bandung Raya:
GK	1	(Indonesia) Hermansyah
CB	20	(Cameroon) Olinga Atangana
CB	19	(Indonesia) Nur'alim	(yellow card) 29'
CB	15	(Indonesia) Herry Kiswanto		(substituted off) 78'
RWB	11	(Indonesia) Surya Lesmana		(substituted off) 63'
LWB	22	(Indonesia) Budiman Yunus
CM	16	(Nigeria) Dahiru Ibrahim
CM	2	(Indonesia) Muhammad Ramdan
CM	17	(Indonesia) Alexander Saununu
CF	12	(Indonesia) Deftendi Yunianto		(substituted off) 51'
CF	8	(Indonesia) Peri Sandria (c)
Substitutes:
GK	20	(Indonesia) Udin Rafiudin
DF	19	(Indonesia) Makmun Adnan
MF	6	(Indonesia) Rehmalem Perangin-Angin		(substituted on) 63' (red card) 72'
MF	12	(Indonesia) Hendriawan		(substituted on) 78'
FW	24	(Liberia) Stephen Weah		(substituted on) 51'
Head Coach:
(Netherlands) Ab Fafié
