= Kekey Zakaria =

Indonesian civil servant and former footballer

Personal information
- Full name: Kekey Zakaria
- Date of birth: 5 May 1968 (age 58)
- Place of birth: Subang, Indonesia
- Position: Striker

Youth career
- 1985: Persikas Subang
- 1985–1987: Pesma FC

Senior career*
Years	Team	Apps	(Gls)
1987–1989	Persib Bandung		
1989–1990	Persegres Gresik		
1990–1991	Petrokimia Putra		
1991–1997	Persib Bandung		
- * Club domestic league appearances and goals

Kekey Zakaria (born 5 May 1968) is an Indonesian civil servant and former footballer who played as a striker. He is well known for his two stints playing for Persib Bandung, winning the 1993–94 Perserikatan and 1994–95 Liga Indonesia Premier Division in his second stint. Between his time with Persib, he also played for Persegres Gresik and Petrokimia Putra.

== Playing career ==
Kekey began his footballing career playing for Persikas Subang in his youth. At the age of 17, Kekey caught the eye of Pesma, a club within the internal competition structure of Persib Bandung, during a friendly in which he scored a goal. Impressed by his performance, one of Pesma's club officials approached him to join them in Bandung. Living in his grandfather's home, he began participating in Persib's internal competition. His performances for Pesma caught the attention of Persib's scouts who offered him a spot in the trials to join the U23 team. After the trials, he was instead promoted to the club's first team for the 1987–88 season. He would ply his time learning from the seniors, training under the tutelage of starting striker Ajat Sudrajat as well as other players such as Suryamin, Dede Iskandar, and Iwan Sunarya. Seeking more playing time, Kekey moved to Gresik joining Persegres Gresik in 1989. The following year, he signed for local neighbours Petrokimia Putra playing in Galatama.

After two and a half years away, Kekey returned to Persib in 1991 under the request of club chairman and then mayor of Bandung Ateng Wahyudi. Replacing Ajat Sudrajat who moved to Bandung Raya, he was paired up front with Sutiono Lamso in Persib's attack. On 20 January 1994, his performance as a substitute in a 4–0 win over Persiraja Banda Aceh caught the attention of Rinus Michels who was watching the match at Siliwangi Stadium. Three years after his return, the club would win the final Perserikatan title in the 1993–94 season, winning 2–0 over PSM in the final.

He played a crucial role in the club's inaugural Liga Indonesia Premier Division campaign in the 1994–95 season, scoring against Medan Jaya and Assyabaab SGS in the second stage before heading in the lone goal of the match against Barito Putera in the semifinal as Persib went on to win the league, their second consecutive national league title.

== Post-playing career ==
Following his retirement from football, Kekey became a civil servant for the West Java Provincial Government stationed at Karawang. He also had brief spells coaching youth football schools in Bandung and Subang while also starting his own football school at Jalancagak district. In 2022, he was appointed as a football administrator for Forum Sepak Bola Generasi Indonesia (FORSGI) in West Java.

== Playing style ==
Possessing a tall stature, Kekey is better known for his agility and positioning. He also frequently played the role of disrupting the concentration of opposing defenders, providing space to shoot for his frequent strike partner, Sutiono Lamso.

== Honours ==
Persib Bandung

- Perserikatan: 1993–94
- Liga Indonesia Premier Division: 1994–95
