= 1997–98 Liga Indonesia Premier Division =

Football season in Indonesia

Liga Indonesia Premier Division
- Season: 1997–98
- Matches: 234
- Goals: 533 (2.28 per match)

The 1997–98 Liga Indonesia Premier Division (known as the Liga Kansas for sponsorship reasons) was the fourth season of the Liga Indonesia Premier Division, the top division of Indonesian football. There were 31 teams involved in this season. Persebaya were the defending champions and were leading their region when the season was abandoned by order of the military on 25 May 1998 due to political and economic turmoil in the country. At that point, 234 matches had been played out of the 317 scheduled.

== Teams ==
=== Team changes ===
The number of teams dropped from 33 to 31 this season.

==== Relegated to First Division ====
- Mataram Indocement
- Persedikab
- Persijatim

==== Promoted to Premier Division ====
- Persikabo
- Persikota
- PSIM

==== Disbanded ====
- ASGS
- Bandung Raya

=== Name changes ===
- Pelita Jaya changed their name to Pelita Jakarta.

=== Stadiums and locations ===
Locations of the teams in the 1997–98 Liga Indonesia Premier Division.
Blue: West Region; Yellow: Central Region; Red: East Region

West Region
Team	Location	Stadium
Arema	Malang	Gajayana
Medan Jaya	Medan	Teladan
Persebaya	Surabaya	Gelora 10 November
Persija	Jakarta (Central Jakarta)	Menteng
Persikab	Cimahi	Sangkuriang
Persikabo	Bogor	Pajajaran
Persiraja	Banda Aceh	Haji Dimurthala
Persita	Tangerang	Benteng
PSBL	Bandar Lampung	Pahoman
Semen Padang	Padang	Haji Agus Salim

Central Region
Team	Location	Stadium
Arseto	Surakarta	Sriwedari
Barito Putera	Banjarmasin	May 17th
Pelita Jakarta	Jakarta (South Jakarta)	Lebak Bulus
Persib	Bandung	Siliwangi
Persikota	Tangerang	Benteng
PSB	Bogor	Pajajaran
PSDS	Deli Serdang	Baharuddin Siregar
PSIM	Mataram	Mandala Krida
PSIS	Semarang	Jatidiri
PSMS	Medan	Teladan
PSP	Padang	Haji Agus Salim

East Region
Team	Location	Stadium
Gelora Dewata	Denpasar	Ngurah Rai
Mitra Surabaya	Surabaya	Gelora 10 November
Persema	Malang	Gajayana
Persiba	Balikpapan	Persiba
Persipura	Jayapura	Mandala
Persma	Manado	Klabat
Petrokimia Putra	Gresik	Petrokimia
PSM	Ujung Pandang	Andi Mattalata
Pupuk Kaltim	Bontang	Mulawarman
Putra Samarinda	Samarinda	Segiri Samarinda

== First stage ==
=== West Region ===
Pos	Team	Pld	W	D	L	GF	GA	GD	Pts
1	Persebaya	14	8	4	2	17	8	+9	28
2	Persija	15	8	3	4	26	15	+11	27
3	Persiraja	15	7	5	3	21	17	+4	26
4	Persita	15	7	3	5	22	15	+7	24
5	PSBL	15	5	6	4	21	23	−2	21
6	Arema	14	4	6	4	9	9	0	18
7	Persikabo	15	5	2	8	17	21	−4	17
8	Persikab	15	5	2	8	12	19	−7	17
9	Semen Padang	15	4	3	8	11	18	−7	15
10	Medan Jaya	15	3	2	10	13	24	−11	11

Source: RSSSF

=== Central Region ===
Pos	Team	Pld	W	D	L	GF	GA	GD	Pts
1	PSMS	16	9	4	3	28	15	+13	31
2	Pelita Jakarta	14	8	3	3	36	12	+24	27
3	Persikota	15	8	3	4	22	17	+5	27
4	Barito Putera	17	6	6	5	17	16	+1	24
5	Persib	15	6	4	5	14	8	+6	22
6	PSIS	16	4	8	4	17	24	−7	20
7	PSB	15	5	4	6	12	15	−3	19
8	PSDS	15	6	0	9	14	25	−11	18
9	PSP	16	3	7	6	14	22	−8	16
10	PSIM	15	3	5	7	10	24	−14	14
11	Arseto	14	3	2	9	10	16	−6	11

Source: RSSSF

=== East Region ===
Pos	Team	Pld	W	D	L	GF	GA	GD	Pts
1	PSM	15	9	3	3	33	8	+25	30
2	Persma	15	6	6	3	17	10	+7	24
3	Gelora Dewata	15	6	5	4	16	16	0	23
4	Putra Samarinda	15	6	4	5	11	15	−4	22
5	Persema	15	6	4	5	14	20	−6	22
6	Mitra Surabaya	15	5	4	6	17	15	+2	19
7	Persipura	16	4	6	6	24	23	+1	18
8	Pupuk Kaltim	15	5	3	7	17	23	−6	18
9	Petrokimia Putra	14	4	4	6	9	18	−9	16
10	Persiba	15	3	3	9	12	22	−10	12

Source: RSSSF

== Top goalscorer ==
- Kurniawan Dwi Yulianto (Pelita Jakarta) is the top goalscorer of 1997–98 Liga Indonesia Premier Division with 20 goals.
