= 1994–95 Liga Indonesia Premier Division =

Football season in Indonesia

Liga Indonesia Premier Division
- Season: 1994–95
- Dates: 27 November 1994 – 30 July 1995
- Champions: Persib; 1st Premier Division title 6th Indonesian title
- Relegated: PS Bengkulu; Warna Agung; PSIR; PSIM; PS Aceh Putra (withdrew)
- Asian Club Championship: Persib
- Asian Cup Winners' Cup: Petrokimia Putra
- Matches: 559
- Goals: 1,417 (2.53 per match)
- Top goalscorer: Peri Sandria (34 goals)
- Biggest home win: Pelita Jaya 10–2 Persijatim (14 June 1995)
- Biggest away win: PS Bengkulu 1–6 Pelita Jaya (15 April 1995); Persijatim 0–5 Arseto (15 April 1995); Warna Agung 0–5 Semen Padang (7 May 1995)
- Highest scoring: Pelita Jaya 10–2 Persijatim (14 June 1995)

The 1994–95 Liga Indonesia Premier Division (known as the Liga Dunhill for sponsorship reasons) was the inaugural season of the Liga Indonesia Premier Division, the top division of Indonesian football following the merger of Perserikatan and Galatama. The season began on 27 November 1994 and ended on 30 July 1995. The league was made up of 34 clubs. Persib won the title after beating Petrokimia Putra 1–0 in the final.

== Overview ==
=== Background ===
The league started in 1994. The lack of ticket sales in Galatama and the lack of commercial aspects in Perserikatan made PSSI take a bold decision. The Indonesian football association decided to form a new fully professional league called the Liga Indonesia Premier Division as a merger of Galatama and Perserikatan.

Due to the merger, there were 34 inaugural clubs in the league. Two clubs that should have been relegated to the First Division, Persiba and PS Bengkulu were allowed to compete while PS Aceh Putra chose to withdraw. To solve this issue, the league is split into two regional groups of 17 clubs each. The top four clubs from each region then entered the second stage which is played in a group stage format consisting of two groups of four. Then, the top two clubs from each group proceed to the knockout stage (semifinals and final) where they will play for the title.

The shift of the league to a more commercial form has made PSSI move to find sponsors to sustain the wheels of the league. Dunhill, a cigarette manufacturer from the UK is the first company to dive in and become the inaugural title sponsor of the league. As a result of this sponsorship, Dunhill poured funds up to Rp4.5 billion per season and provided subsidies of Rp100 million for each Premier Division club. Dunhill also gave a prize of Rp75 million for the champions, Rp50 million for the runners-up, and Rp25 million for the league's best player. The funds provided by Dunhill were pretty high for financial standards in 1994. Thus, the Liga Indonesia Premier Division was then given the name Liga Dunhill.

Before the league started, PSSI also lifted the ban for foreign players to compete in the league that was active since 1982. This resulted in some high-profile signings with clubs signing seasoned veterans of the world stage.

=== Season summary ===
The inaugural duel of the brand-new league brought together the champions of the last edition from each competition on 27 November 1994. Pelita Jaya were the last winners of Galatama while Persib were winners of the 1993–94 Perserikatan. The match ended 1–0 for Pelita Jaya with their striker Dejan Gluščević becoming the first player to score a goal in the new top-flight in the 60th minute.

Several match abandonments occurred throughout the season. A match between BPD Jateng and Arseto was abandoned on 21 December 1994 due to floodlight issues before resuming the following day, ending in a 1–1 draw. Two further abandonments happened near the end of the first stage on 1 June 1995. Persija walked out of their match against Bandung Raya trailing 3–1 at the 68th minute as a protest towards refereeing decisions which escalated into supporter riots. PSIR walked out on a similar manner at the 33rd minute from their match against PSIM with the score level at 0–0. In response to the two matches, the PSSI Disciplinary Committee gave Persija and PSIR sanctions including the addition of two goals against to their respective results, ruling Bandung Raya won 5–1 over Persija and PSIM won 2–0 over PSIR. Furthermore, both clubs had three points deducted in the first stage and were fined Rp5 million each.

By the end of the first stage, PS Bengkulu, Warna Agung, PSIR, and PSIM were the clubs that were relegated from the league. The first wave of foreign players coming to the league proved to be ineffective in improving results, leading to clubs reshuffling the foreign players they had within their squads right before the second stage began.

Persib would eventually become the inaugural champions of the league. The Maung Bandung, who finished as runners-up in the West Region, won the title thanks to a narrow 1–0 victory over Petrokimia Putra in the final held in Gelora Senayan Main Stadium on 30 July 1995. Sutiono Lamso scored in the 76th minute for Persib and they held on to lead until the end of the game. Persib won the title with a team consisting of local players only when most of the title challengers had at least one foreign player. Meanwhile, Bandung Raya striker Peri Sandria was the league's inaugural top scorer. The 34 goals he scored was a top-flight record which stood for 22 years until Sylvano Comvalius scored 37 goals in the 2017 Liga 1.

== Teams ==
=== Stadiums and locations ===
Locations of the teams in the 1994–95 Liga Indonesia Premier Division.
Blue: West Region; Red: East Region

West Region
Team	Location	Stadium
Arseto	Surakarta	Sriwedari
Bandung Raya	Bandung	Siliwangi
BPD Jateng	Semarang	Jatidiri
Mataram Putra	Yogyakarta	Mandala Krida
Medan Jaya	Medan	Teladan
Pelita Jaya	Jakarta (South Jakarta)	Lebak Bulus
Persib	Bandung	Siliwangi
Persija	Jakarta (Central Jakarta)	Menteng
Persijatim	Jakarta (East Jakarta)	Rawamangun
Persiku	Kudus	Wergu Wetan
Persiraja	Banda Aceh	Haji Dimurthala
Persita	Tangerang	Benteng
PS Bengkulu	Bengkulu	Semarak
PSDS	Deli Serdang	Baharuddin Siregar
PSMS	Medan	Teladan
Semen Padang	Padang	Haji Agus Salim
Warna Agung	Jakarta (South Jakarta)	Gelora Senayan

East Region
Team	Location	Stadium
Arema	Malang	Gajayana
ASGS	Surabaya	Gelora 10 November
Barito Putera	Banjarmasin	May 17th
Gelora Dewata	Denpasar	Ngurah Rai
Mitra Surabaya	Surabaya	Gelora 10 November
Persebaya	Surabaya	Gelora 10 November
Persegres	Gresik	Petrokimia
Persema	Malang	Gajayana
Persiba	Balikpapan	Persiba
Persipura	Jayapura	Mandala
Petrokimia Putra	Gresik	Petrokimia
Pupuk Kaltim	Bontang	Mulawarman
Putra Samarinda	Samarinda	Segiri Samarinda
PSIM	Yogyakarta	Mandala Krida
PSIR	Rembang	Krida
PSIS	Semarang	Jatidiri
PSM	Ujung Pandang	Andi Mattalata

=== Kits and sponsorship ===
All of the teams kits are provided by Adidas and sponsored by Dunhill as part of the league's sponsorship deal.

== Foreign players ==
Club	Visa 1	Visa 2	Visa 3	Former players
Arema				
Arseto				
Assyabaab				
Bandung Raya	(Cameroon) Olinga Atangana	(Cameroon) Tibidi Alexis	(Federal Republic of Yugoslavia) Dejan Gluščević	
Barito Putera				
BPD Jateng				
Gelora Dewata	(Angola) Vata Matanu Garcia	(Angola) Abel Campos	(Angola) Jeremie Mboh Nyetam	
Mataram Putra				
Medan Jaya	(Romania) Jijie Claudio	(Romania) Cinca Marius	(Zaire) Makukula Kuyangana	
Mitra Surabaya	(Brazil) Gomes de Oliveira	(Bulgaria) Stoyan Nakev Assano	(Bulgaria) Evelyn Mindev	(Nigeria) Kapula Wa Kapuia
Pelita Jaya	(Cameroon) Maboang Kessack	(Cameroon) Roger Milla	(Federal Republic of Yugoslavia) Milorad Bajovic	(Federal Republic of Yugoslavia) Dejan Gluščević
Persebaya				
Persegres				
Persema				
Persib				
Persiba				
Persija				
Persijatim				
Persiku				
Persipura				
Persiraja				
Persita				
Petrokimia Putra	(Brazil) Carlos de Mello	(Brazil) Jacksen Tiago	(Trinidad and Tobago) Darryl Sinerine	(Angola) Fernando Miquel (Angola) Botonga Efekele
PS Bengkulu				
PSDS				
PSIM				
PSIR				
PSIS				
PSM				
PSMS				
Pupuk Kaltim	(Cameroon) Justin Imandi	(Romania) Iulian Minea	(Cameroon) J.P. Mbvoum Mayoh	(Romania) Iulian Pomuhaci (Brazil) Francisco Jose Soares
Putra Samarinda				
Semen Padang	(Brazil) Claudio Luzardi	(Brazil) Antônio Cláudio	(Ivory Coast) Didier Kessack	
Warna Agung				

== First stage ==
=== West Region ===
Pos	Team	Pld	W	D	L	GF	GA	GD	Pts	Qualification or relegation
1	Pelita Jaya	32	24	5	3	78	25	+53	77	Advance to second stage
2	Persib (C)	32	20	9	3	54	15	+39	69	Advance to second stage
3	Bandung Raya	32	19	10	3	68	26	+42	67	Advance to second stage
4	Medan Jaya	32	15	11	6	46	29	+17	56	Advance to second stage
5	Semen Padang	32	14	10	8	45	25	+20	52	
6	Persiraja	32	14	10	8	37	41	−4	52	
7	Arseto	32	14	6	12	46	38	+8	48	
8	Persita	32	13	6	13	43	41	+2	45	
9	PSMS Medan	32	11	8	13	37	36	+1	41	
10	PSDS	32	10	11	11	38	45	−7	41	
11	Mataram Putra	32	11	6	15	24	31	−7	39	
12	Persiku	32	10	7	15	30	37	−7	37	
13	Persija	32	11	5	16	42	51	−9	35 (Note: Persija were docked three points for walking out of a match against Bandung Raya on 1 June 1995.)	
14	BPD Jateng	32	8	10	14	42	50	−8	34	
15	Persijatim	32	6	6	20	29	71	−42	24	
16	PS Bengkulu (R)	32	5	5	22	28	69	−41	20	Relegation to First Division
17	Warna Agung (R)	32	2	5	25	24	81	−57	11	Relegation to First Division
18	PS Aceh Putra (R)	0	0	0	0	0	0	0	0	Club withdrew (Note: PS Aceh Putra withdrew before the season started.)

Source: RSSSF
(C) Champions; (R) Relegated

=== East Region ===
Pos	Team	Pld	W	D	L	GF	GA	GD	Pts	Qualification or relegation
1	Petrokimia Putra	32	17	9	6	62	31	+31	60	Advance to second stage
2	Pupuk Kaltim	32	15	12	5	58	27	+31	57	Advance to second stage
3	ASGS	32	17	6	9	57	45	+12	57	Advance to second stage
4	Barito Putera	32	17	5	10	51	31	+20	56	Advance to second stage
5	Gelora Dewata	32	15	9	8	50	27	+23	54	
6	Arema	32	15	7	10	44	41	+3	52	
7	Mitra Surabaya	32	15	5	12	45	34	+11	50	
8	Persipura	32	13	9	10	40	42	−2	48	
9	Persebaya	32	12	10	10	45	40	+5	46	
10	PSM	32	11	10	11	31	32	−1	43	
11	Putra Samarinda	32	11	8	13	32	41	−9	41	
12	Persema	32	11	6	15	33	43	−10	39	
13	PSIS	32	10	9	13	28	43	−15	39	
14	Persegres	32	8	8	16	33	49	−16	32	
15	Persiba	32	8	6	18	26	49	−23	30	
16	PSIR (R)	32	5	9	18	26	52	−26	21 (Note: PSIR were docked three points for walking out of a match against PSIM on 1 June 1995.)	Relegation to First Division
17	PSIM (R)	32	2	12	18	14	48	−34	18	Relegation to First Division

Source: RSSSF
(R) Relegated

== Second stage ==
The second stage was played from 19 to 26 July 1995. The matches were held at Gelora Senayan Main Stadium in Jakarta.

=== Group A ===
Pos	Team	Pld	W	D	L	GF	GA	GD	Pts	Qualification
1	Pupuk Kaltim	3	1	2	0	3	2	+1	5	Advance to knockout stage
2	Barito Putera	3	1	2	0	3	2	+1	5	Advance to knockout stage
3	Bandung Raya	3	1	1	1	4	3	+1	4	
4	Pelita Jaya	3	0	1	2	2	5	−3	1	

Source: RSSSF

=== Group B ===
Pos	Team	Pld	W	D	L	GF	GA	GD	Pts	Qualification
1	Persib	3	2	1	0	5	1	+4	7	Advance to knockout stage
2	Petrokimia Putra	3	1	2	0	5	2	+3	5	Advance to knockout stage
3	ASGS	3	1	1	1	4	6	−2	4	
4	Medan Jaya	3	0	0	3	2	7	−5	0	

Source: RSSSF

== Knockout stage ==
Semifinals
28 July – Jakarta
Pupuk Kaltim	0
Petrokimia Putra	1
28 July – Jakarta
Persib	1
Barito Putera	0

Final
30 July – Jakarta
Petrokimia Putra	0
Persib	1

=== Semifinals ===
28 July 1995
15:30 WIB

Pupuk Kaltim	0–1	Petrokimia Putra
	Report	Widodo 54'

Gelora Senayan Main Stadium, Jakarta
Attendance: 60,000
Referee: Widyanto Nugroho (Semarang)

28 July 1995
19:00 WIB

Persib	1–0	Barito Putera
Kekey 80'	Report

Gelora Senayan Main Stadium, Jakarta
Attendance: 70,000
Referee: Khairul Agil (DKI Jakarta)

=== Final ===
30 July 1995
17:30 WIB

Petrokimia Putra	0–1	Persib
	Report	Sutiono 76'

Gelora Senayan Main Stadium, Jakarta
Attendance: 120,000
Referee: Zulkifli Chaniago (Bengkulu)

== Awards ==
=== Top scorers ===
The following is a list of the top scorers from the 1994–95 season.

Rank	Player	Club	Goals
1	(Indonesia) Peri Sandria	Bandung Raya	34
2	(Indonesia) Buyung Ismu	Pelita Jaya	30
3	(Federal Republic of Yugoslavia) Dejan Gluščević	Bandung Raya	22
4	(Angola) Vata Matanu Garcia	Gelora Dewata	21
4	(Indonesia) Sutiono Lamso	Persib	21
5	(Indonesia) Widodo C. Putro	Petrokimia Putra	18

=== Best player ===
- (Indonesia) Widodo C. Putro (Petrokimia Putra)

== See also ==
- 1994–95 Liga Indonesia First Division
- 1994–95 Liga Indonesia Second Division
