= 2003 Liga Indonesia Premier Division =

Liga Indonesia Premier Division
- Season: 2003
- Dates: 12 January – 15 September 2003
- Champions: Persik; 1st Premier Division title 1st Indonesian title
- Relegated: Perseden; Arema; Petrokimia Putra; PSDS; Barito Putera
- AFC Champions League: Persik; PSM
- Matches: 380
- Goals: 993 (2.61 per match)
- Top goalscorer: Oscar Aravena (31 goals)
- Biggest home win: Persipura 6–0 Arema (26 January); Persipura 6–0 Petrokimia Putra (11 June); Persik 6–0 Persipura (26 June)
- Biggest away win: PSPS 1–5 PSDS (27 February)
- Highest scoring: Persik 6–3 Semen Padang (6 April)

The 2003 Liga Indonesia Premier Division (also known as the Liga Bank Mandiri for sponsorship reasons) was the ninth season of the Liga Indonesia Premier Division, the top Indonesian professional league for association football clubs, since its formation in 1994. It began on 12 January and ended on 15 September. Petrokimia Putra were the defending champions.

== Teams ==
=== Team changes ===
==== Relegated from Premier Division ====
- Persebaya
- Persedikab
- Persema
- Persikab
- PSBL
- PSMS

==== Promoted to Premier Division ====
- Persik
- Perseden

=== Stadiums and locations ===
Locations of the teams in the 2003 Liga Indonesia Premier Division.

| Team | Location | Stadium | Capacity |
|---|---|---|---|
| Arema | Malang | Gajayana | 25,000 |
| Barito Putera | Banjarmasin | May 17th | 15,000 |
| Bontang PKT | Bontang | Mulawarman | 12,000 |
| Deltras | Sidoarjo | Gelora Delta | 35,000 |
| Pelita Krakatau Steel | Cilegon | Krakatau Steel | 5,000 |
| Perseden | Denpasar | Kompyang Sujana | 7,000 |
| Persib | Bandung | Siliwangi | 15,000 |
| Persija | Jakarta | Lebak Bulus Stadium | 12,500 |
| Persijatim Solo | Surakarta | Manahan | 20,000 |
| Persik | Kediri | Brawijaya | 20,000 |
| Persikota | Tangerang | Benteng | 15,000 |
| Persipura | Jayapura | Mandala | 30,000 |
| Persita | Tangerang | Benteng | 15,000 |
| Petrokimia Putra | Gresik | Petrokimia | 20,000 |
| PSDS | Deli Serdang | Baharuddin Siregar | 15,000 |
| PSIS | Semarang | Jatidiri | 25,000 |
| PSM | Makassar | Andi Mattalata | 15,000 |
| PSPS | Pekanbaru | Kaharudin Nasution | 30,000 |
| PSS | Sleman | Tridadi | 12,000 |
| Semen Padang | Padang | Haji Agus Salim | 20,000 |

== League standings ==
| Pos | Team | Pld | W | D | L | GF | GA | GD | Pts | Qualification or relegation |
|---|---|---|---|---|---|---|---|---|---|---|
| 1 | Persik (C) | 38 | 18 | 13 | 7 | 72 | 32 | +40 | 67 | Qualification for the AFC Champions League |
| 2 | PSM | 38 | 18 | 8 | 12 | 68 | 48 | +20 | 62 | Qualification for the AFC Champions League |
| 3 | Persita | 38 | 16 | 14 | 8 | 47 | 33 | +14 | 62 | |
| 4 | PSS | 38 | 16 | 12 | 10 | 48 | 43 | +5 | 60 | |
| 5 | Persipura | 38 | 17 | 7 | 14 | 66 | 51 | +15 | 58 | |
| 6 | Persikota | 38 | 16 | 10 | 12 | 59 | 45 | +14 | 58 | |
| 7 | Persija | 38 | 15 | 10 | 13 | 59 | 46 | +13 | 55 | |
| 8 | Semen Padang | 38 | 15 | 10 | 13 | 44 | 54 | −10 | 55 | |
| 9 | PSPS | 38 | 14 | 12 | 12 | 49 | 46 | +3 | 54 | |
| 10 | Bontang PKT | 38 | 16 | 5 | 17 | 49 | 49 | 0 | 53 | |
| 11 | Persijatim | 38 | 14 | 11 | 13 | 47 | 47 | 0 | 53 | |
| 12 | Deltras | 38 | 14 | 9 | 15 | 49 | 55 | −6 | 51 | |
| 13 | PSIS | 38 | 14 | 8 | 16 | 43 | 45 | −2 | 50 | |
| 14 | Pelita Krakatau Steel | 38 | 15 | 5 | 18 | 48 | 56 | −8 | 50 | |
| 15 | Perseden (R) | 38 | 14 | 6 | 18 | 46 | 56 | −10 | 48 | Qualification to relegation play-offs |
| 16 | Persib (O) | 38 | 12 | 9 | 17 | 35 | 48 | −13 | 45 | Qualification to relegation play-offs |
| 17 | Arema (R) | 38 | 11 | 11 | 16 | 39 | 59 | −20 | 44 | Relegation to First Division |
| 18 | Petrokimia Putra (R) | 38 | 11 | 9 | 18 | 52 | 72 | −20 | 42 | Relegation to First Division |
| 19 | PSDS (R) | 38 | 11 | 8 | 19 | 43 | 56 | −13 | 41 | Relegation to First Division |
| 20 | Barito Putera (R) | 38 | 9 | 11 | 18 | 30 | 52 | −22 | 38 | Relegation to First Division |

Source: RSSSF
(C) Champions; (O) Play-off winners; (R) Relegated

== Relegation play-offs ==
Perseden and Persib compete with Persela and PSIM in a round-robin play-off to secure two spots in next season's Premier Division. The matches were held in Solo.

| Pos | Team | Pld | W | D | L | GF | GA | GD | Pts | Promotion or relegation |
|---|---|---|---|---|---|---|---|---|---|---|
| 1 | Persib | 3 | 2 | 1 | 0 | 6 | 4 | +2 | 7 | Promotion to Premier Division |
| 2 | Persela | 3 | 1 | 1 | 1 | 3 | 2 | +1 | 4 | Promotion to Premier Division |
| 3 | PSIM | 3 | 1 | 1 | 1 | 1 | 1 | 0 | 4 | Relegation to First Division |
| 4 | Perseden | 3 | 0 | 1 | 2 | 5 | 8 | −3 | 1 | Relegation to First Division |

Source: RSSSF

== Awards ==
=== Top scorers ===
This is a list of the top scorers from the 2003 season.

| Rank | Player | Club | Goals |
|---|---|---|---|
| 1 | (Chile) Oscar Aravena | PSM | 31 |
| 2 | (Nigeria) Bamidelle Frank Bob Manuel | Persik | 29 |
| 3 | (Uruguay) Cristian Gonzáles | PSM | 27 |
| 4 | (Indonesia) Bambang Pamungkas | Persija | 24 |
| 5 | (Brazil) Marcelo Braga | PSS | 21 |
| 5 | (Indonesia) Musikan | Persik | 21 |

=== Best player ===
- (Indonesia) Musikan (Persik).
