= 1999–2000 Liga Indonesia Premier Division =

Football season in Indonesia

Liga Indonesia Premier Division
- Season: 1999–2000
- Dates: 7 November 1999 – 23 July 2000
- Champions: PSM; 1st Premier Division title 6th Indonesian title
- Relegated: Indocement Cirebon; Medan Jaya; PSIS; PSIM
- Asian Club Championship: PSM
- Asian Cup Winners' Cup: Pupuk Kaltim
- Matches: 379
- Goals: 903 (2.38 per match)
- Top goalscorer: Bambang Pamungkas (24 goals)
- Biggest home win: Semen Padang 9–1 Medan Jaya (7 June 2000)
- Biggest away win: Medan Jaya 0–4 Persikota (17 February 2000)
- Highest scoring: Semen Padang 9–1 Medan Jaya (7 June 2000)

The 1999–2000 Liga Indonesia Premier Division (known as the Liga Bank Mandiri for sponsorship reasons) was the sixth season of the Liga Indonesia Premier Division, the top division of Indonesian football. The season began on 7 November 1999 and ended on 23 July 2000. The league was made up of 28 clubs. PSM won the title after beating Pupuk Kaltim 3–2 in the final.

This season was marred with the death of Persebaya's Eri Irianto on 3 April 2000, after collapsing following a heart attack on the pitch during a league match against PSIM Yogyakarta.

== Teams ==
=== Team changes ===
==== Relegated from Premier Division ====
- Persiba
- Persikabo
- Persita

==== Promoted to Premier Division ====
- Indocement Cirebon
- Persijatim
- PSPS

=== Name changes ===
- Pelita Bakrie changed their name to Pelita Solo following their relocation to Surakarta.

=== Stadiums and locations ===
Locations of the teams in the 1999-2000 Liga Indonesia Premier Division.
Blue: West Region; Red: East Region

West Region
Team	Location	Stadium
Indocement Cirebon	Cirebon	Bima Stadium
Medan Jaya	Medan	Teladan
Persib	Bandung	Siliwangi
Persija	Jakarta (Central Jakarta)	Lebak Bulus Stadium
Persijatim	Jakarta (East Jakarta)	Rawamangun
Persikab	Cimahi	Sangkuriang
Persikota	Tangerang	Benteng
Persiraja	Banda Aceh	Harapan Bangsa
PSBL	Bandar Lampung	Pahoman
PSDS	Deli Serdang	Baharuddin Siregar
PSMS	Medan	Teladan
PSP	Padang	Haji Agus Salim
PSPS	Pekanbaru	Kaharudin Nasution
Semen Padang	Padang	Haji Agus Salim

East Region
Team	Location	Stadium
Arema	Malang	Gajayana
Barito Putera	Banjarmasin	May 17th
Gelora Dewata	Denpasar	Ngurah Rai
Pelita Solo	Surakarta	Manahan
Persebaya	Surabaya	Gelora 10 November
Persema	Malang	Gajayana
Persipura	Jayapura	Mandala
Persma	Manado	Klabat
Petrokimia Putra	Gresik	Petrokimia
PSIM	Mataram	Mandala Krida
PSIS	Semarang	Jatidiri
PSM	Makassar	Andi Mattalata
Pupuk Kaltim	Bontang	Mulawarman
Putra Samarinda	Samarinda	Segiri Samarinda

== First stage ==
=== West Region ===
Pos	Team	Pld	W	D	L	GF	GA	GD	Pts	Qualification or relegation
1	Persija	26	14	9	3	48	27	+21	51	Advance to second stage
2	Persijatim	26	14	4	8	49	27	+22	46	Advance to second stage
3	Persikota	26	13	6	7	40	21	+19	45	Advance to second stage
4	PSMS	26	12	9	5	34	21	+13	45	Advance to second stage
5	PSPS	26	13	6	7	41	36	+5	45	
6	Semen Padang	26	11	11	4	38	20	+18	44	
7	Persiraja	26	12	2	12	31	33	−2	38	
8	Persib	26	8	8	10	22	21	+1	32	
9	PSBL	26	8	6	12	23	39	−16	30	
10	PSDS	26	7	7	12	38	42	−4	28	
11	Persikab	26	7	7	12	24	37	−13	28	
12	PSP	26	6	8	12	21	31	−10	26	
13	Indocement Cirebon (R)	26	6	7	13	22	36	−14	25	Relegation to First Division
14	Medan Jaya (R)	26	4	4	18	19	59	−40	16	Relegation to First Division

Source: RSSSF
(R) Relegated

=== East Region ===
Pos	Team	Pld	W	D	L	GF	GA	GD	Pts	Qualification or relegation
1	PSM (C)	26	16	8	2	41	13	+28	56	Advance to second stage
2	Arema	26	14	5	7	31	18	+13	47	Advance to second stage
3	Pupuk Kaltim (Note: Pupuk Kaltim were docked three points for abandoning a match against PSM Makassar.)	26	15	3	8	45	25	+20	45	Advance to second stage
4	Pelita Solo	26	12	9	5	31	18	+13	45	Advance to second stage
5	Persipura	26	11	7	8	37	24	+13	40	
6	Persebaya	26	9	8	9	31	25	+6	35	
7	Persma	26	10	5	11	34	29	+5	35	
8	Persema	26	8	10	8	27	26	+1	34	
9	Barito Putera	26	9	5	12	22	35	−13	32	
10	Petrokimia Putra	26	8	7	11	27	38	−11	31	
11	Putra Samarinda	26	8	4	14	28	42	−14	28	
12	Gelora Dewata	26	7	6	13	25	41	−16	27	
13	PSIS (R)	26	6	6	14	22	32	−10	24	Relegation to First Division
14	PSIM (R)	26	4	7	15	15	50	−35	19	Relegation to First Division

Source: RSSSF
(R) Relegated

== Second stage ==
=== Group A ===
Pos	Team	Pld	W	D	L	GF	GA	GD	Pts	Qualification
1	Persikota	3	1	2	0	3	2	+1	5	Advance to knockout stage
2	Persija	3	1	1	1	4	4	0	4	Advance to knockout stage
3	Arema	3	1	1	1	3	5	−2	4	
4	Pelita Solo	3	1	0	2	4	3	+1	3	

Source: RSSSF

=== Group B ===
Pos	Team	Pld	W	D	L	GF	GA	GD	Pts	Qualification
1	PSM	3	3	0	0	8	4	+4	9	Advance to knockout stage
2	Pupuk Kaltim	3	1	1	1	4	4	0	4	Advance to knockout stage
3	Persijatim	3	0	2	1	3	5	−2	2	
4	PSMS	3	0	1	2	2	4	−2	1	

Source: RSSSF

== Knockout stage ==
Semifinals
20 July – Jakarta
PSM	1
Persija	0
20 July – Jakarta
Persikota	0 (3)
Pupuk Kaltim (pen.)	0 (4)

Final
23 July – Jakarta
PSM	3
Pupuk Kaltim	2

=== Semifinals ===
20 July 2000
15:30 WIB

PSM	1–0	Persija
Bento 11'

Gelora Senayan Main Stadium, Jakarta

20 July 2000
19:00 WIB

Persikota Tangerang	0–0	Pupuk Kaltim
Penalties
Ritham (penalty scored); Benben (penalty scored); Giman (penalty scored)	3–4	(penalty scored) Fakhri; (penalty scored) Ardiansyah; (penalty scored) Ponaryo; (penalty scored) Ahmad

Gelora Senayan Main Stadium, Jakarta

=== Final ===
23 July 2000
17:30 WIB

PSM	3–2	Pupuk Kaltim
Kurniawan 39', 73'; Rachman 55'		Aris 75'; Fakhri 80' (pen.)

Gelora Senayan Main Stadium, Jakarta
Attendance: 30,000
Referee: Djadjat Sudradjat

== Awards ==
=== Top scorer ===
- (Indonesia) Bambang Pamungkas (Persija) 24 goals.

=== Best player ===
- (Indonesia) Bima Sakti (PSM)
