= 1996–97 Liga Indonesia Premier Division =

Indonesian football season

Liga Indonesia Premier Division
- Season: 1996–97
- Dates: 17 November 1996 – 28 July 1997
- Champions: Persebaya; 1st Premier Division title 5th Indonesian title
- Relegated: Persijatim; Mataram Indocement; Persedikab
- Asian Club Championship: Persebaya
- Asian Cup Winners' Cup: PSM
- Matches: 351
- Goals: 895 (2.55 per match)
- Top goalscorer: Jacksen Tiago (26 goals)

The 1996–97 Liga Indonesia Premier Division (known as the Liga Kansas for sponsorship reasons) was the third season of the Liga Indonesia Premier Division, the top division of Indonesian football. The worsening macro economics situation prior to the Asian financial crisis forced the PSSI to further divide the league into three regions, up from the previous season's two, to reduce cost related to logistical problems owing to the vastness of Indonesian geography. The season began on 17 November 1996 and ended on 28 July 1997. Persebaya won the title after beating the defending champions, Bandung Raya 3–1 in the final.

== Teams ==
=== Team changes ===
The number of teams increased from 31 to 33 this season.

==== Relegated to First Division ====
- BPD Jateng
- Persegres

==== Promoted to Premier Division ====
- Persedikab
- PSB
- PSBL
- PSP

=== Name changes ===
- Mataram Putra changed their name to Mataram Indocement.

=== Stadiums and locations ===
Locations of the teams in the 1996–97 Liga Indonesia Premier Division.
Blue: West Region; Yellow: Central Region; Red: East Region

West Region
Team	Location	Stadium
Arema	Malang	Gajayana
Bandung Raya	Bandung	Siliwangi
Medan Jaya	Medan	Teladan
Persebaya	Surabaya	Gelora 10 November
Persija	Jakarta (Central Jakarta)	Menteng
Persijatim	Jakarta (East Jakarta)	Rawamangun
Persikab	Cimahi	Sangkuriang
Persiraja	Banda Aceh	Haji Dimurthala
Persita	Tangerang	Benteng
PSBL	Bandar Lampung	Pahoman
Semen Padang	Padang	Haji Agus Salim

Central Region
Team	Location	Stadium
Arseto	Surakarta	Sriwedari
Barito Putera	Banjarmasin	May 17th
Mataram Indocement	Mataram	Mandala Krida
Mitra Surabaya	Surabaya	Gelora 10 November
Pelita Jaya	Jakarta (South Jakarta)	Lebak Bulus
Persib	Bandung	Siliwangi
PSB	Bogor	Pajajaran
PSDS	Deli Serdang	Baharuddin Siregar
PSIS	Semarang	Jatidiri
PSMS	Medan	Teladan
PSP	Padang	Haji Agus Salim

East Region
Team	Location	Stadium
ASGS	Surabaya	Gelora 10 November
Gelora Dewata	Denpasar	Ngurah Rai
Persedikab	Kediri	Canda Bhirawa
Persema	Malang	Gajayana
Persiba	Balikpapan	Persiba
Persipura	Jayapura	Mandala
Persma	Manado	Klabat
Petrokimia Putra	Gresik	Petrokimia
PSM	Ujung Pandang	Andi Mattalata
Pupuk Kaltim	Bontang	Mulawarman
Putra Samarinda	Samarinda	Segiri Samarinda

== First stage ==
=== West Region ===
Pos	Team	Pld	W	D	L	GF	GA	GD	Pts	Qualification or relegation
1	Persebaya (C)	20	13	4	3	62	18	+44	43	Advance to second stage
2	Bandung Raya	20	11	2	7	30	17	+13	35	Advance to second stage
3	Arema	20	10	5	5	26	20	+6	35	Advance to second stage
4	Persiraja	20	10	2	8	23	16	+7	32	Advance to second stage
5	Persita	20	10	2	8	24	22	+2	32	
6	PSBL	20	8	7	5	19	16	+3	31	
7	Semen Padang	20	8	6	6	20	17	+3	30	
8	Persikab	20	6	7	7	17	19	−2	25	
9	Medan Jaya	20	6	7	7	24	25	−1	25	
10	Persija	20	4	3	13	23	31	−8	15	
11	Persijatim (R)	20	0	3	17	8	75	−67	3	Relegation to First Division

Source: RSSSF
(R) Relegated

=== Central Region ===
Pos	Team	Pld	W	D	L	GF	GA	GD	Pts	Qualification or relegation
1	Persib	20	8	10	2	22	14	+8	34	Advance to second stage
2	Pelita Jaya	20	9	6	5	36	21	+15	33	Advance to second stage
3	Mitra Surabaya	20	8	8	4	25	11	+14	32	Advance to second stage
4	Barito Putera	20	8	5	7	23	24	−1	29	Advance to second stage
5	PSP	20	8	5	7	22	25	−3	29	
6	PSIS	20	7	5	8	21	20	+1	26	
7	Arseto	20	7	5	8	15	20	−5	26	
8	PSB (Note: PSB were docked three points for abandoning a match against Barito Putera.)	20	6	7	7	20	20	0	22	
9	PSDS	20	5	7	8	13	25	−12	22	
10	PSMS	20	3	10	7	10	19	−9	19	
11	Mataram Indocement (R)	20	4	6	10	13	21	−8	18	Relegation to First Division

Source: RSSSF
(R) Relegated

=== East Region ===
Pos	Team	Pld	W	D	L	GF	GA	GD	Pts	Qualification or relegation
1	PSM	20	14	1	5	48	21	+27	43	Advance to second stage
2	Gelora Dewata	20	12	2	6	37	27	+10	38	Advance to second stage
3	Persma	20	11	3	6	33	21	+12	36	Advance to second stage
4	Persipura	20	11	2	7	31	22	+9	35	Advance to second stage
5	Putra Samarinda	20	10	2	8	28	28	0	32	
6	Petrokimia Putra	20	10	2	8	21	26	−5	32	
7	Pupuk Kaltim	20	10	0	10	39	22	+17	30	
8	Persema	20	7	1	12	30	37	−7	22	
9	Persiba	20	6	3	11	25	35	−10	21	
10	ASGS	20	5	2	13	26	43	−17	17	
11	Persedikab (R)	20	3	4	13	15	51	−36	13	Relegation to First Division

Source: RSSSF
(R) Relegated

== Second stage ==
=== Group A ===
Pos	Team	Pld	W	D	L	GF	GA	GD	Pts	Qualification
1	Persebaya	3	3	0	0	14	4	+10	9	Advance to knockout stage
2	Mitra Surabaya	3	2	0	1	9	7	+2	6	Advance to knockout stage
3	Persiraja	3	1	0	2	4	9	−5	3	
4	Gelora Dewata	3	0	0	3	3	10	−7	0	

Source: RSSSF

=== Group B ===
Pos	Team	Pld	W	D	L	GF	GA	GD	Pts	Qualification
1	Bandung Raya	3	2	1	0	5	0	+5	7	Advance to knockout stage
2	Persib	3	1	2	0	1	0	+1	5	
3	Persma	3	0	2	1	2	5	−3	2	
4	Barito Putera	3	0	1	2	2	5	−3	1	

Source: RSSSF

=== Group C ===
Pos	Team	Pld	W	D	L	GF	GA	GD	Pts	Qualification
1	PSM	3	3	0	0	5	2	+3	9	Advance to knockout stage
2	Pelita Jaya	3	2	0	1	4	3	+1	6	
3	Arema	3	1	0	2	4	5	−1	3	
4	Persipura	3	0	0	3	3	6	−3	0	

Source: RSSSF

=== Ranking of second-placed teams ===
Pos	Grp	Team	Pld	W	D	L	GF	GA	GD	Pts	Qualification
1	A	Mitra Surabaya	3	2	0	1	9	7	+2	6	Advance to knockout stage
2	C	Pelita Jaya	3	2	0	1	4	3	+1	6	
3	B	Persib	3	1	2	0	1	0	+1	5	

Source: RSSSF

== Knockout stage ==
Semifinals
25 July – Jakarta
Persebaya	3
PSM	2
26 July – Jakarta
Bandung Raya	1
Mitra Surabaya	0

Final
28 July – Jakarta
Persebaya	3
Bandung Raya	1

=== Semifinals ===
25 July 1997
19:00 WIB

Persebaya	3–2	PSM
Yusuf Ekodono 16'; Tiago 35'; Justinho Pinhiero 70'	Report	Issac Fatary 10'; Leandro 44'

Gelora Senayan Main Stadium, Jakarta
Attendance: 60.000
Referee: Kim Tae-young (South Korea)

26 July 1997
15:30 WIB

Bandung Raya	1–0	Mitra Surabaya
Dahiru Ibrahim 28'	Report

Gelora Senayan Main Stadium, Jakarta
Attendance: 60.000
Referee: Kim Young-joo (South Korea)

=== Final ===
28 July 1997
17:30 WIB

Persebaya	3–1	Bandung Raya
Aji 58' (pen.); Tiago 60'; Pieters 80'		Budiman 84'

Gelora Senayan Main Stadium, Jakarta
Referee: Kim Dae-hyung (South Korea)

== Awards ==
=== Top scorers ===
The following is a list of the top scorers from the 1996–97 season.

Rank	Player	Club	Goals
1	(Brazil) Jacksen Tiago	Persebaya	26
2	(Indonesia) Isaac Fatary	PSM	15
3	(Angola) Vata Matanu Garcia	Gelora Dewata	14
4	(Indonesia) Peri Sandria	Bandung Raya	13
4	(Sierra Leone) Musa Kallon	PSM	13
4	(Indonesia) Gatot Indra	Persiba	13
4	(Cameroon) Tibidi Alexis	Mitra Surabaya	13

=== Best player ===
- (Indonesia) Nur'alim (Bandung Raya)

== See also ==
- 1996–97 Liga Indonesia First Division
- 1996–97 Liga Indonesia Second Division
