= Alexis Tibidi =

Alexis Tibidi may refer to:

- Alexis Tibidi (footballer, born 1975), Cameroonian football midfielder
- Alexis Tibidi (footballer, born 2003), French football forward, and son of footballer born 1975
