= Budiman Yunus =

Indonesian footballer and coach

Personal information
- Full name: Budiman Yunus
- Date of birth: 5 August 1972 (age 54)
- Place of birth: Bandung, Indonesia
- Height: 1.69 m (5 ft 6 1/2 in)
- Position: Left-back

Senior career*
Years	Team	Apps	(Gls)
1990–1993	Persib Bandung		
1993–1997	Bandung Raya		
1997–1999	Persikab Bandung		
1999–2004	Persija Jakarta	74	(2)
2004–2005	Persema Malang		
2005–2006	Persikabo Bogor		
2006–2008	Persibat Batang		
2008–2010	Persidafon Dafonsoro		

International career
1996–2000	Indonesia	10	(0)

Managerial career
- 2011–2012: Bandung FC
- 2015: Persib U-21
- 2017–2018: Persib U-19
- 2019: Bandung United (Assistant coach)
- 2019: Bandung United
- 2020–2023: Persib Bandung (Assistant coach)
- 2022: Persib Bandung (Caretaker)
- * Club domestic league appearances and goals

Budiman Yunus (born 5 August 1972) is an Indonesian assistant coach for Persib Bandung. Previously he played as defender for Persib Bandung, Bandung Raya, Persikab Bandung, Persija Jakarta, Persema Malang, Persikabo Bogor, Persibat Batang, Persidafon Dafonsoro and the Indonesia national team.

In 2011, he started his managerial career with the Liga Primer Indonesia club Bandung FC.

== Club statistics ==
Club	Season	Super League		Premier Division		Piala Indonesia		Total	
Club	Season	Apps	Goals	Apps	Goals	Apps	Goals	Apps	Goals
Persija Jakarta	2002	-		20	0	-		20	0
Total		-		20	0	-		20	0

== Honours ==
Bandung Raya

- Liga Indonesia Premier Division: 1995–96; runner up: 1996–97

Persija Jakarta

- Liga Indonesia Premier Division: 2001

Indonesia

- AFF Championship runner-up: 2000
