= Ajat Sudrajat =

Indonesian footballer

Personal information
- Date of birth: 5 July 1962 (age 64)
- Place of birth: Bandung, Indonesia
- Height: 1.65 m (5 ft 5 in)
- Position: Midfielder

Senior career*
Years	Team	Apps	(Gls)
1980–1990	Persib Bandung		
1991–1997	Bandung Raya		

International career
- Indonesia
- * Club domestic league appearances and goals

Ajat Sudrajat (born 5 July 1962) is an Indonesian former footballer who plays as a midfielder.

== Career ==
Sudrajat started his career with Indonesian side Persib Bandung. After that, he signed for Indonesian side Bandung Raya.

== Honours ==
Persib Bandung

- Perserikatan: 1986, 1989–90

Bandung Raya

- Liga Indonesia Premier Division: 1995–96
