= Nur'alim =

Indonesian footballer (born 1973)

Personal information
- Full name: Nur'alim
- Date of birth: 27 December 1973 (age 52)
- Place of birth: Bekasi, Indonesia
- Height: 1.80 m (5 ft 11 in)
- Position: Defender

Senior career*
Years	Team	Apps	(Gls)
1991–1994	Persikasi Bekasi		
1994–1996	Bandung Raya		
1996–2002	Persija Jakarta		
2003	Pelita Krakatau Steel		
2004	Persita Tangerang		
2005–2007	PKT Bontang		
2011	Bandung		

International career
1993–2003	Indonesia	51	(0)
- * Club domestic league appearances and goals

Nur'alim (born 27 December 1973) is an Indonesian former footballer who played as a defender.

== Early life ==
Nur'alim has been nicknamed "Jabrik".

== Career ==
Nur'alim played for Indonesian side Bandung Raya, helping the club win the league.

== Personal life ==
After retiring from professional football, Nur'alim worked in the parking industry.

== Honours ==
Bandung Raya

- Liga Indonesia Premier Division: 1995–96; runner up: 1996–97

Persija Jakarta

- Liga Indonesia Premier Division: 2001

Indonesia

- AFF Championship runner-up: 2000, 2002; third place: 1998
- SEA Games silver medal: 1997; bronze medal: 1999

Individual

- Liga Indonesia Premier Division Best Player: 1996–97
