= Henk Wullems =

Dutch footballer and manager (1936–2020)

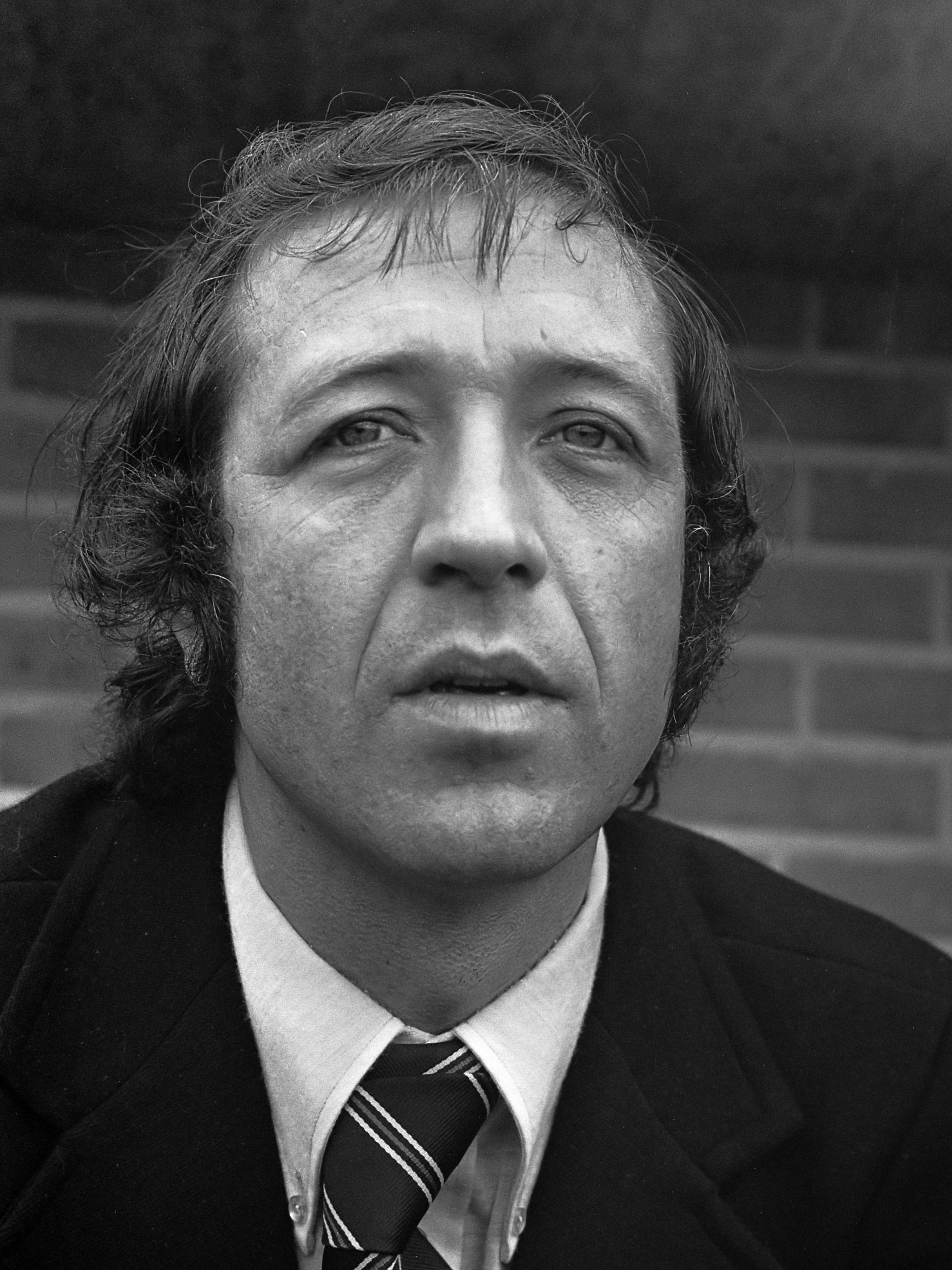
- Henk Wullems (1973)

Personal information
- Date of birth: 21 January 1936
- Place of birth: Haarlem, Netherlands
- Date of death: 15 August 2020 (aged 84)
- Place of death: Udenhout, Netherlands
- Position: Defender

Senior career*
Years	Team	Apps	(Gls)
1954–1957	RCH		
1957–1962	KFC		
1962–1965	RCH		

Managerial career
- 1968–1971: Blauw-Wit Amsterdam
- 1971–1972: Willem II
- 1972–1975: NAC Breda
- 1976–1983: SBV Vitesse
- 1983–1986: Go Ahead Eagles
- 1986–1988: SBV Excelsior
- 1990–1993: AZ
- 1995–1996: Bandung Raya
- 1996–1997: Indonesia
- 1999–2000: PSM Makassar (technical director)
- 2002–2003: Arema Malang
- 2007–2008: Bali Persegi FC
- * Club domestic league appearances and goals

Henk Wullems (21 January 1936 – 15 August 2020) was a Dutch association football manager.

In the early sixties he was a defender playing for Kooger Football Club (nl) and Racing Club Heemstede. Wullems was the manager of, among others, the eredivisie teams NAC Breda (1972–75), SBV Vitesse (1977–83), Go Ahead Eagles (1983–86), and AZ (1990–93). From 1996 to 1997 he was manager of the Indonesia national football team, winning a silver medal with them at the 1997 Southeast Asian Games. From 2000 to 2007 he managed a number of Indonesia Super League teams, becoming champion with three of them. Henk Wullems died on 15 August 2020 due to illness after cerebral infarction.

== Honours ==
=== Player ===
KFC

- Eerste Divisie: 1959–60

=== Manager ===
NAC Breda

- KNVB Cup: 1972–73

SBV Vitesse

- Eerste Divisie: 1976–77

Bandung Raya

- Liga Indonesia Premier Division: 1995–96

Indonesia

- SEA Games silver medal: 1997
