= Óscar Aravena =

Chilean footballer (born 1978)

Personal information
- Full name: Óscar Alejandro Aravena Loncón
- Date of birth: 8 January 1978 (age 48)
- Place of birth: Concepción, Chile
- Position: Striker

Senior career*
Years	Team	Apps	(Gls)
1998–1999	Fernández Vial		
2000	Universidad de Concepción		
2001–2002	Fernández Vial		
2003	Persela Lamongan		
2003	PSM Makassar		
2004	Persela Lamongan		
2006	Persija Jakarta		
2009	Bali Devata		
2009	Lota Schwager		
2010	Bali Devata		
- * Club domestic league appearances and goals

Óscar Alejandro Aravena Loncón (born in Chile) is a Chilean former footballer who played as a striker.

== Career ==
In 1998 and 1999, played in A. Fernández Vial.

In 2000 Óscar signed in CD Universidad de Concepción.

In 2001 returned to A. Fernández Vial.

In 2003, Aravena signed for PSM Makassar in the Indonesian league, coinciding with his compatriot Jorge Toledo, where he was the top scorer with 31 goals. After that, he played for Indonesian clubs Persela Lamongan and Persija Jakarta, but failed to play as well.

In 2010, Aravena signed for Bali Devata in the independent Liga Primer Indonesia. However, because the league was not recognized by the Indonesian football federation, he was subsequently banned from playing in the Indonesian league.

== Personal life ==
He is nicknamed Milo.

== Honours ==
=== Club ===
Persela Lamongan

- Piala Gubernur Jatim: 2003

=== Individual ===
- Liga Indonesia Premier Division Top Goalscorer: 2003
- Piala Gubernur Jatim Top Scorer: 2003
