= Ab Fafié =

Dutch football player and manager (1941–2012)

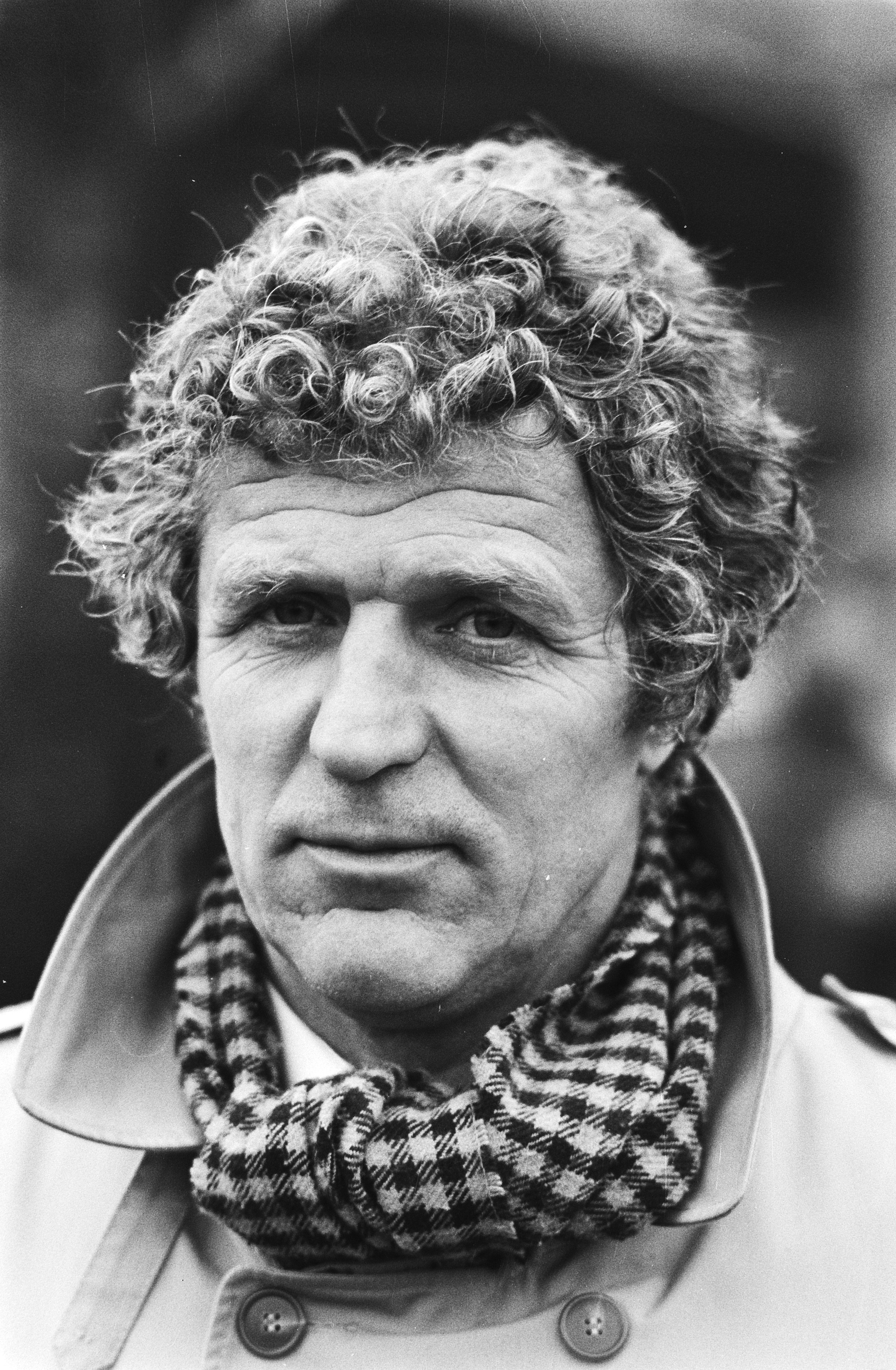
- Fafié in 1982

Personal information
- Full name: Albert Fafié
- Date of birth: 4 March 1941
- Place of birth: Rotterdam, Netherlands
- Date of death: 27 November 2012 (aged 71)
- Position: Left-back

Youth career
- Feijenoord

Senior career*
Years	Team	Apps	(Gls)
1959–1963	Feijenoord	4	(0)
1963–1968	Xerxes	151	(1)
1968–1970	PSV	13	(0)
Total		168	(1)

Managerial career
- 1981–1984: Feyenoord (assistant)
- 1984–1986: Feyenoord
- 1986: AEK Athens
- 1987: PAS Giannina
- 1988–1989: AA Gent
- 1990–1993: FC Utrecht
- 1994: AEK Larnaca
- 1995–1996: Go Ahead Eagles
- 1996–1997: Bandung Raya
- 1997–1998: Persija Jakarta
- * Club domestic league appearances and goals

Ab Fafié (4 March 1941 – 27 November 2012) was a Dutch professional football player and manager.

== Playing career ==
Fafié made his debut for hometown club Feijenoord against Fortuna '54 in 1959 and also played for Rotterdam club Xerxes as well as for PSV. During an injury-hit spell he only played 13 games for the Eindhovenaren.

== Managerial career ==
Fafié became assistant to Feyenoord manager Hans Kraay in 1981 and was named caretaker after Kraay's dismissal in 1983. He took charge in 1984 after Thijs Libregts was sacked and ended up third in the Eredivisie in both his seasons at the helm. He later managed a number of teams throughout Europe, including AEK Athens, AA Gent, FC Utrecht and Go Ahead Eagles where he had succeeded the dismissed Henk Ten Cate.

At Utrecht, Fafié earned the nickname King Ab after steering them to European football with a fourth-placed finish in his first season. The club crashed out of next year's UEFA Cup to Spanish giants Real Madrid and after some less successful seasons, Fafié was given the sack in 1994.

He also had spells in charge at two Indonesian clubs and coached the final years of his life at amateur sides CVV, Overmaas, WSE and NBSVV.

== Personal life ==
Fafié died in November 2012, aged 71.
