= Dejan Gluščević =

Serbian footballer and manager

Personal information
- Full name: Dejan Gluščević
- Date of birth: 21 June 1967 (age 59)
- Place of birth: Prijepolje, SFR Yugoslavia
- Height: 1.80 m (5 ft 11 in)
- Position: Striker

Senior career*
| Years | Team | Apps | (Gls) |
| 1984–1985 | Polimlje | | |
| 1985–1986 | Zvezdara | | |
| 1986–1992 | Red Star Belgrade | | |
| 1987–1988 | → Zemun (loan) | | |
| 1988–1989 | → Čukarički (loan) | | |
| 1990–1992 | → Radnički Belgrade (loan) | 53 | (28) |
| 1992–1993 | Proodeftiki | | |
| 1993–1994 | Proleter Zrenjanin | 15 | (0) |
| 1994–1995 | Pelita Jaya | 15 | (4) |
| 1995–1997 | Bandung Raya | 62 | (48) |
| 1999 | Tanjong Pagar United | | |
| 2000 | Montreal Impact | 4 | (2) |
| 2001–2002 | North York Astros | | |

Managerial career
- 2002: North York Astros (player-coach)
- 2005: North York Astros
- 2006–2009: Red Star Belgrade (youth)
- 2009–2010: Rad Belgrade (youth)
- 2010–2016: Singapore U15
- 2017: Vanuatu U20
- * Club domestic league appearances and goals

Dejan Gluščević (Serbian Cyrillic: Дејан Глушчевић; born June 21, 1967) is a Serbian former footballer and manager.

== Club career ==
Gluščević made his debut in professional football playing with Radnički Beograd in the 1990–91 Yugoslav Second League. He scored an impressive 13 goals in 25 appearances. The next year, due to the break-up of Yugoslavia, Radnički played in the 1991–92 Yugoslav First League and impressed again by scoring 15 goals in 28 appearances. Gluščević was transferred by Red Star Belgrade to Proodeftiki F.C. of the Beta Ethnic in 1992, but due to the club's financial constraints he went back to the Yugoslav First League's Proleter Zrenjanin and helped them to qualify for the Yugoslav Cup quarterfinals.

In 1994, he went to Indonesia to sign with Pelita Jaya FC and played in the AFC Champion's Cup tournament against Ilhwa Chuma from South Korea. After Pelita Jaya FC was eliminated from Champion's Cup, Dejan was loaned to Bandung Raya of the Liga Indonesia Premier Division, where he won the league title and finished as the league's top goalscorer with 30 goals. After scoring a hat-trick in the AFC Winners' Cup in 1997, he returned to rivals Pelita Jaya to support the "FA Primavera project" with young Indonesian internationals. In 1999, after the Indonesian League was stopped due to political issues, he went to Singapore to sign with Tanjong Pagar United FC of the S.League and was the team's top scorer.

In 2000, he went to Canada to sign with the Montreal Impact of the USL A-League. He appeared in four matches and recorded two goals. After Montreal released him from his contract due to the club's financial constrains. On May 23, 2001, the North York Astros of the Canadian Professional Soccer League signed Gluščević. In 2002, North York appointed him head coach. He managed to lead the club to the CPSL Championship finals against Ottawa Wizards, but they were defeated by a score of 2-0. In 2005, he returned to coach the Astros and clinched them a postseason berth.

== Managerial career ==
In 2002, North York Astros appointed him as their new head coach . Throughout the season, he managed to lead the club to the CPSL Championship finals against Ottawa Wizards, but they were defeated by a score of 2-0. In 2005, he returned to coach the Astros and clinched them a postseason berth. As a result of his achievement, the league awarded him the CPSL Coach of the Year award. During his tenure in Canada, he was employed by the Ontario Soccer Association, where he achieved a silver medal with the Ontario U-15 team in 2002, and another silver medal in 2005 with the U-14 team.

In 2005, he returned to Serbia to manage the youth sides of Red Star Belgrade and Rad Belgrade. In 2010, he was hired by the Football Association of Singapore in order to coach the Singapore U-15 national team. In 2017, he was appointed the manager of the Vanuatu national under-20 football team. In 2018, he served as an assistant coach for FK Zemun in the Serbian SuperLiga.

In late 2019, reports were circulating that Indonesian side Persija Jakarta were interested in offering Gluščević a managerial position. The reports ultimately proved to be incorrect as he denied receiving any offers from the club. Gluščević returned to the Serbian top-tier league to join the management staff of FK Rad as an assistant coach in September 2020.

== Honours ==
=== Player ===
Zemun

- Serbian Republic League: 1987–88

Bandung Raya FC

- Liga Indonesia Premier Division: 1995–96

North York Astros

- CPSL Championship runner-up: 2002

Individual

- Liga Indonesia Premier Division Top Goalscorer: 1995–96 (30 goal)/ 33 caps

=== Manager ===
Singapore U-15

- AFF U-16 Youth Championship fourth place: 2011

Individual

- CPSL Coach of the Year: 2005
