= Alexis Tibidi (footballer, born 1975) =

Cameroonian footballer

Personal information
- Full name: Alexis Flavien Tibidi
- Date of birth: 10 July 1975 (age 51)
- Position: Midfielder

Senior career*
| Years | Team | Apps | (Gls) |
| 1994–1995 | Bandung Raya | | |
| 1995–1996 | Las Palmas B | | |
| 1996–1997 | Mitra Surabaya | | (12) |
| 1998 | Sabah FA | | |
| 1999–2001 | Ronse | | |
| 2001–2002 | Tournais | | |
| 2003 | Arema Malang | | |
| 2004 | Lessines-Ollignies | | |
| 2004–2005 | Persibom Bolaang Mongondow | | |
| 2006–2007 | PSBL Langsa | | |

International career
| 1995 | Cameroon | 1 | (0) |
- * Club domestic league appearances and goals

Alexis Flavien Tibidi (born 10 July 1975) is a Cameroonian former professional footballer who played as a midfielder.

== Personal life ==
Tibidi is the father of the France youth international footballer Alexis Tibidi Jr.
