= PS Petrokimia Putra =

Indonesian football club

Petrokimia Putra
- Full name: Persatuan Sepakbola Petrokimia Putra
- Nickname: Kebo Giras
- Founded: 20 May 1988; 38 years ago
- Dissolved: 2005; 21 years ago (merged with Persegres Gresik)
- Ground: Petrokimia Stadium
- Capacity: 20,000
- Owner: Petrokimia Gresik
- 2005: Liga Indonesia Premier Division/1st round (East region), 14th
Home colours

Persatuan Sepakbola Petrokimia Putra was an Indonesian football club based in Gresik, East Java. They last played in the Liga Indonesia First Division. They merged with Persegres Gresik and became Gresik United in 2005.

== History ==
Petrokimia Putra Gresik was established on 20 May 1988. Since its establishment, the club is funded by the fertilizer factory, Petrokimia Gresik, has been active in the Liga Indonesia Premier Division for more than 15 years. Petrokimia Putra was at the Galatama club, which is professional football clubs in Indonesia. Many big clubs from Galatama that were once in the same class with Petrokimia Putra are now already defunct, such as Krama Yudha Tiga Berlian, Bandung Raya, Warna Agung, Pardedetex Medan, Assyabaab Surabaya, Perkesa 1978, BPD Jateng, Yanita Utama, Makassar Utama, and Indonesia Muda. Perhaps, the clubs who are still surviving until now are Arema, Barito Putera, and Semen Padang and some of them now changing their name, Niac Mitra now known as Mitra Kukar, Pelita Jaya changing their name so many times until they using the current name, Madura United, PKT Bontang now become Bontang FC and Petrokimia Putra merged with Persegres United and became Gresik United.

When they first entered to Galatama, actually in Gresik there was a local club that was playing in Perserikatan First Division, namely Persegres Gresik. In fact, some of the first batch of Petrokimia Putra players are Persegres alumni. At that time, the enthusiasm of the people of Gresik was more inclined to Persegres than to Petrokimia Putra. Some of Petrokimia Putra's first batch of players who graduated from Persegres, including Sasono Handito, Ferril Hattu, Rubianto, Reno Latupeirissa, Karyanto, Abdul Muis, Masrukan, Lutfi, Hasan Maghrobi, Derry Krisyanto, and many others.

When the first edition of Liga Indonesia Premier Division was held in 1994–95, Petrokimia Putra was given with title "Champion without trophy". Because, in the final at the Gelora Bung Karno Stadium, they lost to Persib Bandung with a score of 0–1. In fact, in that match, Petrokimia scored the first goal through Jacksen F. Tiago. However, the referee annulled for no apparent reason.

Petrokimia Putra become the champion of 2002 Liga Indonesia Premier Division after beating Persita Tangerang at the final with score 2–1. This achievement broke the hegemony of big city clubs in the main row of national football. Usually the league champions are won by teams from big cities. Unfortunately in the next season, Petrokimia relegated to Liga Indonesia First Division.

== Season-by-season records ==
| Season | League/Division | Tms. | Pos. | Piala Indonesia | AFC/AFF competition(s) | |
|---|---|---|---|---|---|---|
| 1994-95 | Premier Division | 34 | 2 | – | – | – |
| 1995 | Premier Division | 31 | 8th, East region | – | Asian Cup Winners | Quarter-finals |
| 1996–97 | Premier Division | 33 | 6th, East region | – | – | – |
| 1997–98 | Premier Division | 31 | did not finish | – | – | – |
| 1998-99 | Premier Division | 28 | Second round | – | – | – |
| 1999-2000 | Premier Division | 28 | 10 th East region | – | – | – |
| 2001 | Premier Division | 28 | 6 th East region | – | – | – |
| 2002 | Premier Division | 24 | 1 | – | AFC Champions League | Qualifying round |
| 2003 | Premier Division | 20 | 18 | – | ASEAN Club Championship | 3 |
| 2004 | First Division | 24 | 5 th East region | – | – | – |
| 2005 | Premier Division | 28 | 14th, East division | Second round | – | – |

== Honours ==
=== Domestic ===
- Liga Indonesia Premier Division
  - Champions (1): 2002

=== Invitational ===
- ASEAN Club Championship
  - Third place (1): 2003

== Continental record ==
=== AFC Competitions ===
| Season | Competition | Round | Club | Home | Away | Aggregate |
|---|---|---|---|---|---|---|
| 1995 | Asian Cup Winners' Cup | Second round | (Thailand) Rajapracha UCOM FC | 3–2 | 4–5 | 7–7 (a) |
| 1995 | Asian Cup Winners' Cup | Quarter finals | (Japan) Bellmare Hiratsuka | 1–1 | 0–6 | 1–7 |
| 2002–03 | AFC Champions League | Qualifying round | (China) Shanghai Shenhua | 3–1 | 1–5 | 4–6 |

=== AFF Competitions ===
| Season | Competition | Round | Club | Home | Away | Aggregate |
|---|---|---|---|---|---|---|
| 2003 | ASEAN Club Championship | Group A | (Cambodia) Samart United | 2–0 | | 1st |
| 2003 | ASEAN Club Championship | Quarter Final | Singapore Armed Forces | 3–2 (a.e.t) | | |
| 2003 | ASEAN Club Championship | Semi Final | (India) Kingfisher East Bengal | 1–1 (p) 6–7 | | |
| 2003 | ASEAN Club Championship | 3rd Place Playoff | (Malaysia) Perak FA | 3–0 | | 3rd place |
