= Peri Sandria =

Indonesian footballer and manager

Personal information
- Date of birth: 23 September 1969 (age 57)
- Place of birth: Tandem, Binjai, North Sumatra, Indonesia
- Height: 1.78 m (5 ft 10 in)
- Position: Striker

Team information
- Current team: PS Siak (coach)

Youth career
- 1986–1989: Diklat Ragunan

Senior career*
Years	Team	Apps	(Gls)
1989–1991	KTB Bekasi	34	(18)
1991–1993	Assyabaab Surabaya	31	(8)
1993–1994	Putra Samarinda	28	(14)
1994–1997	Bandung Raya	70	(64)
1998–1999	Persib Bandung		
1999	Persikabo Bogor		
2004	Persipo Purwakarta	??	(6)
Total		149	(88)

International career
1990–1996	Indonesia	14	(5)

Managerial career
- 2004: Persipo Purwakarta (player manager)
- 2009: AC Suah Api Football School
- 2009–2010: PS Siak
- 2010–2011: Persipon Pontianak
- 2012–2013: PS Siak
- 2014–2015: Pelita Bandung Raya (Assistant coach)
- 2016–2017: PS Marinir
Medal record
Men's football
Representing Indonesia
Southeast Asian Games
Gold medal – first place	1991 Philippines	Team
- * Club domestic league appearances and goals

Peri Sandria (born 23 September 1969) is an Indonesian former football player and manager. He also played for Indonesia national football team in the 1996 Tiger Cup.

== Club careers ==
Peri Sandria began his career in Galatama with the club KTB Bekasi, shortly before the first national professional competition, the Liga Indonesia.

For the 1994–1995 season began he was transferred to Bandung Raya. He gained Indonesia League trophy with Bandung Raya in 1995–96 season and runner-up in the next season. He also won the top scorer with 34 goals scored in the first edition of Liga Indonesia.

Following consistent success there, when Bandung Raya's folded in 1998 he joined one of the major Bandung clubs, Persib Bandung and he retired in lower division club.

== International career ==
He received his first international cap in 1991 and retired from the Indonesia national football team in 1996, appearing in 7 matches.

Peri Sandria scored the first goal for Indonesia in the 1996 Tiger Cup tournament against Laos.

=== International goals ===
No.	Date	Venue	Opponent	Score	Result	Competition
1.	2 September 1996	National Stadium, Singapore, Singapore	Laos	5–0	5–1	1996 Tiger Cup
2.	7 September 1996	National Stadium, Singapore, Singapore	Cambodia	2–0	3–0	1996 Tiger Cup
3.	9 September 1996	National Stadium, Singapore, Singapore	Myanmar	2–0	6–1	1996 Tiger Cup
4.	9 September 1996	National Stadium, Singapore, Singapore	Myanmar	3–1	6–1	1996 Tiger Cup

== Honours ==
=== Clubs ===
Diklat Ragunan

- Asian Cup for Student: 1987, 1988, 1989

KTB Palembang

- Piala Liga: 1991

Bandung Raya

- Liga Indonesia Premier Division: 1995–96; runner-up: 1996–97

=== National teams ===
Indonesia

- SEA Games gold medal: 1991

=== Individual ===
- Liga Indonesia Premier Division Top Goalscorer: 1994–95
