= Jacksen F. Tiago =

Brazilian footballer and manager (born 1968)

Personal information
- Full name: Jacksen Ferreira Tiago
- Date of birth: 28 May 1968 (age 58)
- Place of birth: Rio de Janeiro, Brazil
- Height: 1.70 m (5 ft 7 in)
- Position: Striker

Youth career
- 1975–1983: Flamengo

Senior career*
Years	Team	Apps	(Gls)
1984–1989	Bonsucesso		
1990	Confiança		
1991	Madureira		
1992	Botafogo		
1992	Americano		
1993	Noroeste		
1993	Valério		
1994	Rubro Social		
1994–1995	Petrokimia Putra	29	(18)
1995–1996	PSM Makassar	35	(14)
1996–1998	Persebaya Surabaya		
1998	Guangzhou Matsunichi		
1999	Geylang United		
1999–2000	Persebaya Surabaya		
2001	Home United		
2001	Petrokimia Putra		

Managerial career
- 2002–2003: Assyabaab Surabaya
- 2003–2005: Persebaya Surabaya
- 2006: Persita Tangerang
- 2007: Persiter Ternate
- 2008: Mitra Kukar
- 2008: Persitara Jakarta Utara
- 2008–2014: Persipura Jayapura
- 2013: Indonesia (assistant coach)
- 2013: Indonesia
- 2014–2016: Penang FA
- 2017–2019: PS Barito Putera
- 2019–2021: Persipura Jayapura
- 2021–2022: Persis Solo
- * Club domestic league appearances and goals

Jacksen Ferreira Tiago (born 28 May 1968) commonly known as Jacksen F. Tiago or JFT, is a Brazilian retired footballer. After retiring from playing, he became a football manager. One of the most influential in Indonesian football history, he has a tremendous records for both as a player and as a manager. As a long-time resident of Indonesia, he is fluent in Indonesian and Javanese.

== Playing career ==
In his first season in Indonesia League, he played for PS Petrokimia Putra which ended up as league runners-up Indonesia's first. Tiago then moved to PSM Makassar before finding success with Persebaya Surabaya. He was the best player in the Liga Indonesia on the season 1996–97 when he helped Persebaya to championship.

After two seasons in Persebaya, he then moved to Singapore to play for Geylang United, but only lasted one season before returning to Persebaya. In 2001, he moved to Petrokimia and at the end of the season retired as a player.

Tiago brought Persebaya, which relegated the previous season, promotion to the First Division in 2003 and winner of the season 2004.

== Management career ==
In 2008, he signed managerial contract with Persipura Jayapura. During his tenure at Persipura Jayapura, he won three Indonesia Super League titles in the 2008–09, 2010–11, and 2013 seasons.

In March 2013, the Football Association of Indonesia (PSSI) requested Jacksen to become assistant coach of the Indonesia national team in the face of Saudi Arabia at the 2015 AFC Asian Cup qualification round. After that in April he was officially appointed by the PSSI as head coach of the Indonesia national team.

In November 2014, he signed with Penang FA, and brought Penang FA promotion to the Malaysia Super League.

In 2017 seasons of Liga 1 Indonesia, he signed a long-term contract with PS Barito Putera.

== Personal life ==
Jacksen decided to convert to Islam on 15 October 2024 at the Nabil Husein Islamic Boarding School, Samarinda, the moment Jacksen converted to Islam was shared by his son who is also a footballer, Hugo Samir on his personal Instagram account.

== Honours and awards ==
=== Player ===
Bonsucesso

- Rio State Championship Second Level: 1984

Confiança

- Campeonato Sergipano: 1990

Petrokimia Putra

- Liga Indonesia Premier Division runner-up: 1994–95

PSM Makassar

- Liga Indonesia Premier Division runner-up: 1995–96

Persebaya Surabaya

- Liga Indonesia Premier Division: 1996–97

==== Individual ====
- Liga Indonesia Premier Division Top Goalscorer: 1996–97

=== Manager ===
Persebaya Surabaya

- Liga Indonesia Premier Division: 2004
- Liga Indonesia First Division: 2003

Persipura Jayapura

- Indonesia Super League: 2008–09, 2010–11, 2013
- Indonesian Community Shield: 2009
- Indonesian Inter Island Cup: 2011

Persis Solo

- Liga 2: 2021

==== Individual ====
- Indonesia Super League Fair Play Award: 2008–09
- Indonesia Super League Coach of the Year: 2013
- Mario Jorge Lobo Zagallo Trophy: 2011

== Controversies ==
On 15 April 2014, after press conference match between Persipura Jayapura vs Persebaya Surabaya, Jacksen got into a fight with Greg Nwokolo, because they have personal problems since his tenure as Indonesia national football team coach, the situation eased after the police restrained both of them.
