= Medan Jaya F.C. =

Indonesian football club

Medan Jaya
- Full name: Medan Jaya Football Club
- Nickname: The Sumatra Deer
- Founded: 1987; 39 years ago
- Ground: Teladan Stadium, Medan, North Sumatra
- Capacity: 15,000
- Owner: PT. Medana Sport
- Chairman: Bobby Nasution
- League: Liga 4
- 2021–22: Round of 16, (North Sumatra zone)
Home colours	Away colours

Medan Jaya or Penajam Medan Jaya (2008–09) or Madina Medan Jaya (2010–now) is an Indonesian football academy club owned by the municipal government based in Medan, North Sumatra. The club was founded in 1987 and currently competes in Liga 4. Their home ground is Teladan Stadium.

== History ==
Since the club establishment in 1987, it has become a well-respected club in the era of competition Galatama and the Premier Division as well. However, the achievements of the club started to decline in the late 1990s. Medan Jaya was relegated to the First Division during the 1999/2000 season. It returned to the top tier but was relegated again to the Second Division in 2004. Medan Jaya managed to win promotion to First Division the following season.

=== Name ===
- PS Medan Jaya (1987–2008; original club name).
- Penajam Medan Jaya (2008–2009; incorporating the name of the owner of the majority stake).
- Madina Medan Jaya (2010–present; incorporating the name of the owner of the majority stake).

== Season-by-season records ==
Season	League/Division	Tms.	Pos.	Piala Indonesia
1987–88	Galatama Premier Division	14	10	–
1988–90	Galatama Premier Division	18	5	–
1990	Galatama Premier Division	18	12	–
1990–92	Galatama Premier Division	20	6	–
1992–93	Galatama Premier Division	17	3	–
1993–94	Galatama Premier Division	17	4	–
1994–95	Premier Division	34	4th, Second round	–
1995–96	Premier Division	31	10th, West division	–
1996–97	Premier Division	33	9th, West division	–
1997–98	Premier Division	31	did not finish	–
1998–99	Premier Division	28	4th, Group A	–
1999–2000	Premier Division	28	14th, West division	–
2001	First Division	23	3rd, West group	–
2002	First Division	27	6th, Group 4	–
2003	Second Division	28	Disqualified	–
2004	Second Division	41	3rd, First round	–
2005	Second Division	23	Second round	–
2006	First Division	36	8th, Group 1	–
2007–08	First Division	40	Withdrew	–
2008–09	Second Division	82	First round	–
2009–10	First Division	60	Disqualified	–
2010	First Division	57	4th, Second round	–
2011–12	First Division	66	4th, Third round	–
2013	First Division	77	Disqualified	–
2014	First Division	73	3rd, Group B	–
2015	Liga Nusantara	season abandoned		–
2016	ISC Liga Nusantara	32		–
2017	Liga 3	32	Eliminated in provincial round	–
2018	Liga 3	32	Eliminated in provincial round	–
2019				
2020	Liga 3	season abandoned		–
2021–22	Liga 3	64	Eliminated in provincial round	–
