= PSDS Deli Serdang =

Indonesian football club

- Full name: Persatuan Sepakbola Deli Serdang
- Nicknames: Traktor Kuning (The Yellow Tractor)
- Short name: PDS; PSDS; SDG
- Founded: 19 April 1958; 68 years ago
- Ground: Baharuddin Siregar Stadium
- Capacity: 15,000
- Owner: PT. Traktor Kuning Deli Serdang
- Chairman: Khairum Rizal
- Manager: Herman Sagita
- Coach: Didik Wahyudi Kusaini
- League: Liga 4
- 2025–26: Liga Nusantara, 5th (Group A); Relegation play-off loser (relegated)
- Website: psds-deliserdang-fc.id
Home colours	Away colours	Third colours

Persatuan Sepakbola Deli Serdang, simply known as PSDS, is an Indonesian football club.based in Deli Serdang, North Sumatra. They currently compete in Liga 4 and their homebase is Baharuddin Siregar Stadium.

== Players ==
=== Current squad ===
As of November 2025

Note: Flags indicate national team as defined under FIFA eligibility rules; some limited exceptions apply. Players may hold more than one non-FIFA nationality.

No.	Pos.	Nation	Player
1	GK	IDN	Adinda Mustika
2	DF	IDN	Gavra Asyawal
4	DF	IDN	Mochamad Arifin
5	DF	IDN	Zefta Giffari
7	MF	IDN	Ayub Arrazak
9	FW	IDN	Baskoro Prasetia
13	MF	IDN	Muhammad Wildan
14	DF	IDN	Wanapati Buwono
15	MF	IDN	Rizky Tri Ananda
16	DF	IDN	Daffa Sahrian
17	MF	IDN	Diky Ariyanto
18	MF	IDN	Edgarda Buntoro
19	DF	IDN	Alib Hablian
20	GK	IDN	Fahry Bagas
21	DF	IDN	Paksi Rasendriya

No.	Pos.	Nation	Player
22	MF	IDN	Abdi Solihin
24	DF	IDN	Ikhsan Afandi
25	GK	IDN	Ferry Bagus
26	FW	IDN	Arie Dwiarty
27	FW	IDN	Fison Zagani (captain)
28	FW	IDN	Kurniawan
29	MF	IDN	Purnomo
30	FW	IDN	Ridho Pandiangan
34	MF	IDN	Abhista Daffa
44	DF	IDN	Akbar Haris
45	DF	IDN	Ferdinan Siburian
66	DF	IDN	Marvel Devara
77	MF	IDN	Danil Donovan
91	FW	IDN	Faisal Bayu
99	FW	IDN	Zaky Reanando

== Season-by-season records ==
Season(s)	League/Division	Tms.	Pos.	Piala Indonesia	AFC competition(s)	
1994–95	Premier Division	34	10th, West division	–	–	–
1995–96	Premier Division	31	8th, West division	–	–	–
1996–97	Premier Division	33	9th, Central division	–	–	–
1997–98	Premier Division	31	did not finish	–	–	–
1998–99	Premier Division	28	3rd, Group A	–	–	–
1999–2000	Premier Division	28	10th, West division	–	–	–
2001	Premier Division	28	10th, West division	–	–	–
2002	Premier Division	24	9th, West division	–	–	–
2003	Premier Division	20	19	–	–	–
2004	First Division	24	2	–	–	–
2005	Premier Division	28	12th, West division	Round of 16	–	–
2006	Premier Division	28	13th, West division	First round	–	–
2007–08	Premier Division	36	14th, West division	Second round	–	–
2008–09	Premier Division	29	9th, Group 1	First round	–	–
2009–10	Premier Division	33	10th, Group 1	–	–	–
2010–11	Premier Division	39	Withdrew	–	–	–
2011–12	First Division (LPIS)	66	3rd, Group 2	–	–	–
2013	First Division	77	First round	–	–	–
2014	Liga Nusantara	24	Eliminated in Regional round	–	–	–
2015	Liga Nusantara	season abandoned		–	–	–
2016	ISC Liga Nusantara	32		–	–	–
2017	Liga 3	32	Round of 16	–	–	–
2018	Liga 3	32	Eliminated in Regional round	First round	–	–
2019	Liga 3	32	Eliminated in Provincial round	First round	–	–
2020	Liga 3	season abandoned		–	–	–
2021–22	Liga 3	64	Semi-final	–	–	–
2022–23	Liga 2	28	did not finish	–	–	–
2023–24	Liga 2	28	3rd, Relegation round	–	–	–
2024–25	Liga Nusantara	16	2nd, Relegation round	–	–	–
2025–26	Liga Nusantara	24	Relegation play-off loser	–	–	–

== Honours ==
- Perserikatan First Division
  - Champion (1): 1986–87
- Liga Indonesia First Division
  - Runner-up (1): 2004
- Liga 3 North Sumatra
  - Champions (3): 2017, 2018, 2021
- Soeratin Cup
  - Winner (1): 2012
