= Baharuddin Siregar Stadium =

Stadium in North Sumatra, Indonesia

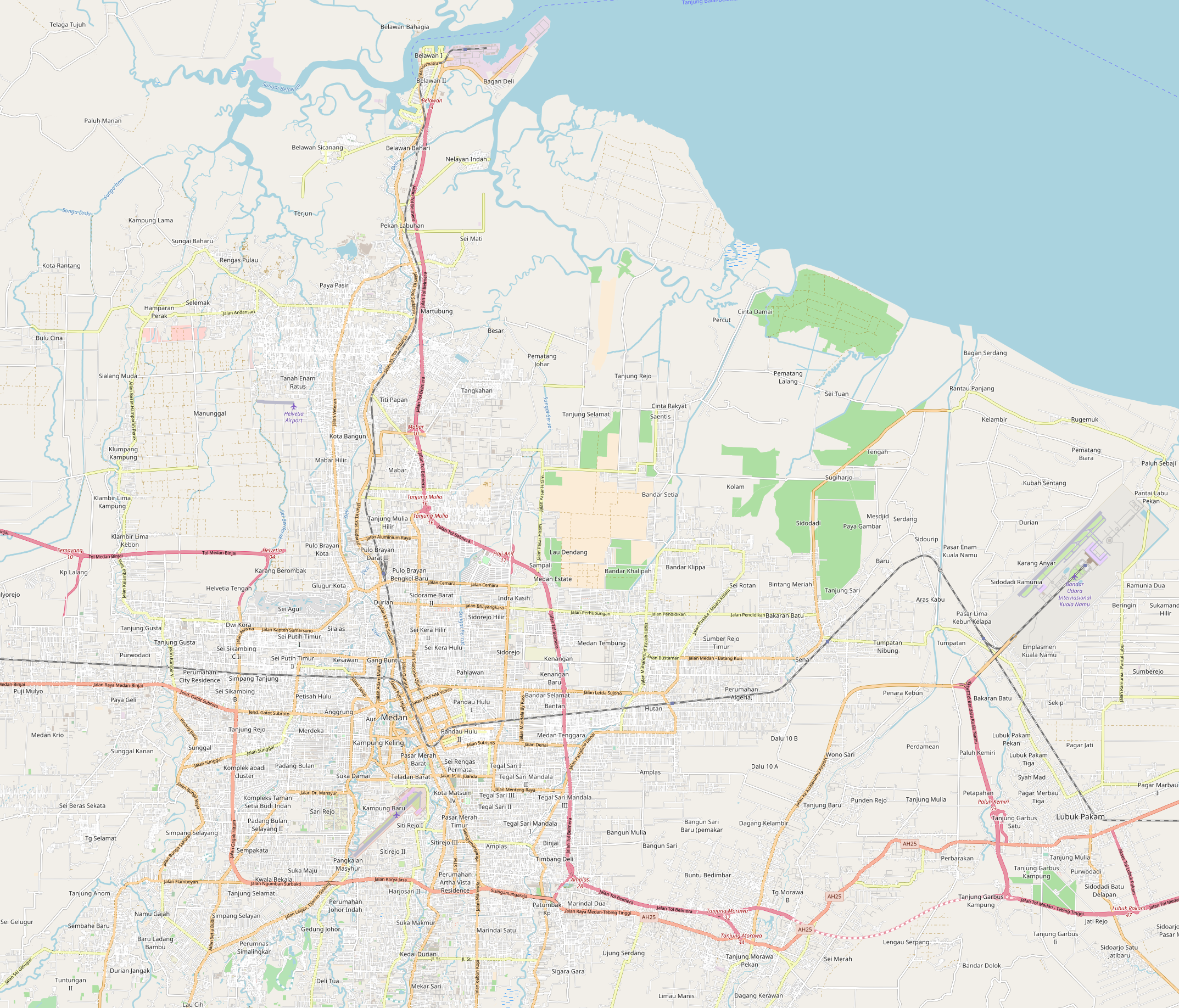
- Location in the city of Medan
- Address: Jalan Medan - Tebing Tinggi Ring Road, Komplek Pemerintahan Deli Serdang, Pagar Merbau, Lubuk Pakam, Perbarakan, Pagar Merbau, Deli Serdang Regency, North Sumatra 20551
- Location: Lubuk Pakam, Deli Serdang Regency, Indonesia
- Coordinates: 3.550368°N 98.864509°E
- Owner: Government of Deli Serdang Regency
- Operator: Government of Deli Serdang Regency
- Capacity: 15,000

Construction
- Opened: 1971; 55 years ago
- Renovated: 2000

Tenant
- PSDS Deli Serdang

Baharuddin Siregar Stadium is a multi-use stadium in Lubuk Pakam, Deli Serdang Regency, North Sumatra, Indonesia. It is currently used mostly for football matches and is used as the home stadium for PSDS Deli Serdang. The stadium has a capacity of 15,000 people.
