= Petrokimia Stadium =

Stadium in East Java, Indonesia

Petrokimia Stadium Tri Dharma Stadium
- Location in Greater Surabaya, Java and Indonesia Petrokimia Stadium (Java) Petrokimia Stadium (Indonesia)
- Address: Jalan Noto Prayitno No.16, Karangturi, Gresik, Gresik Regency, East Java 61121; Indonesia
- Location: Gresik, Gresik Regency, East Java
- Coordinates: 7°9′35.8″S 112°38′20.5″E
- Owner: Petrokimia Gresik
- Capacity: 25,000

Tenant
- Gresik United

Petrokimia Stadium (also known as Tri Dharma Stadium) is a multi-use stadium in Gresik Regency, East Java, Indonesia. It has a capacity of 25,000 people and is the home of Gresik United (formerly known as Petrokimia Putra).
