= Siliwangi Stadium =

Multi-purpose stadium in Bandung, Indonesia

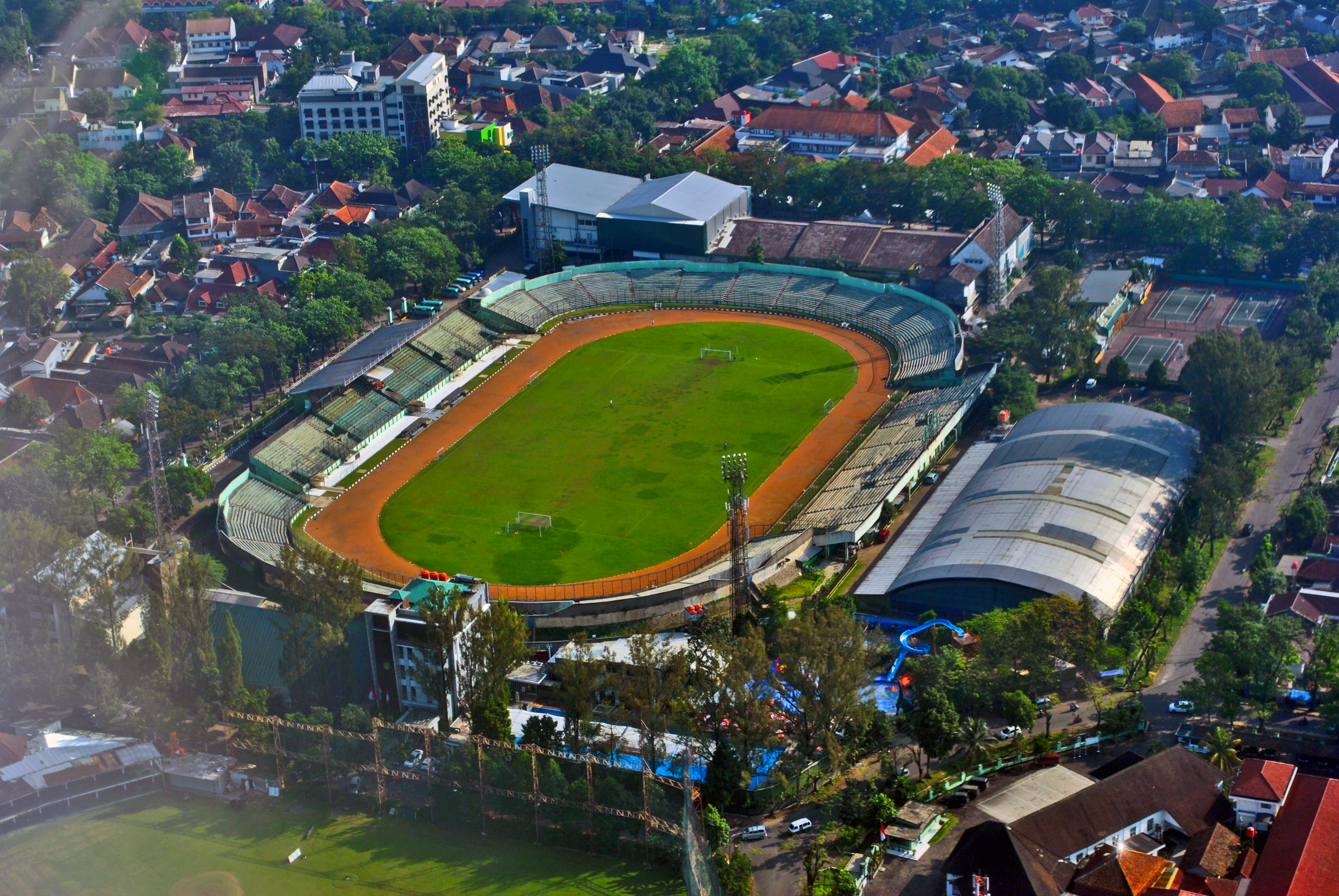
- Aerial view of Siliwangi Stadium in 2014

- Location in Bandung
- Full name: Stadion Siliwangi
- Address: Jl. Lombok No.10
- Location: Merdeka, Sumur Bandung, Bandung, Indonesia
- Coordinates: 6°54′37″S 107°37′10″E
- Owner: Kodam III/Siliwangi
- Operator: Kodam III/Siliwangi
- Capacity: 25,000
- Surface: Artificial turf

Construction
- Built: 1 January 1954
- Opened: 24 March 1956
- Renovated: 1976
- Architect: Formatara Prima Sejati

Tenants
- Persib Bandung (1956–2013); Persib Bandung U-21 (1956–present); Persib Bandung U-19 (1956–present); Bandung Raya (1987–1997); Bandung F.C. (2011); PS TNI (2016); Bandung United (2019–present); PSKC Cimahi (2020–2024)

Siliwangi Stadium (Indonesian: Stadion Siliwangi) is a multi-purpose stadium in Bandung, Indonesia. It is currently used mostly for football matches. The stadium is owned by Kodam III/Siliwangi and holds a capacity of 25,000. It served as the home stadium of Persib Bandung from 1956 to 2013.

== History ==
The field where the stadium was built on was originally known as SPARTA field, referencing the Dutch East Indies military-owned team of the same name who were based in Bandung around the year 1916. They moved into the city from Batavia and were using the field for training and leisure activities, including drill practice due to its proximity within the military environment.

In 1954, nine years after Indonesia’s independence, construction of a stadium began under the management of Kodam III/Siliwangi to provide a facility for physical training. The stadium was also built to dedicate the civilians who were involved in the Bandung Sea of Fire. Funding for the stadium was provided by taking cents off of every staff and soldier’s wages from Kodam III/Siliwangi for two years. The construction of the stadium itself costs up to Rp6 million for a variety of facilities though only the stadium ended up coming to fruition.

The stadium was officially opened on 24 March 1956 by Commander A. E. Kawilarang. With an opening football tournament being contested by Persib Bandung, Persija Jakarta, and PSIM Yogyakarta. During their time in the stadium, Persib would win the Perserikatan four times in the 1959–61, 1986, 1989–90, and 1993–94 seasons as well as the 1994–95 Liga Indonesia Premier Division title.

By 2009, Siliwangi Stadium was deemed unsuitable for Persib, especially in regards to capacity and security. The club would begin using Si Jalak Harupat Stadium for their bigger games beginning with the 2009–10 season. The stadium would remain as one of the club's home stadiums up until the 2013 season. Persib would play all of its home matches in Si Jalak Harupat Stadium starting in 2014 due to not getting permission to host games in it by PSSI though it remains used for training as well as their youth and reserve teams.

Besides Persib, it also served as the home stadium for Bandung Raya throughout its entire existence and Bandung F.C. of the independent Liga Primer Indonesia in 2011.

The military-owned PS TNI played at the venue during the temporary Indonesia Soccer Championship in 2016, but the team only played two home matches there before moving to Pakansari Stadium due to the stadium being used as a cricket venue for the 2016 Pekan Olahraga Nasional.

In 2020, PSKC Cimahi would use the stadium as their new home ground following their promotion to Liga 2. It would be used until 2024 when they moved to Si Jalak Harupat Stadium. Outside of football, the stadium remains in use for training and recreation purposes by Indonesian National Armed Forces members and the general public.

== Renovation ==
The stadium was renovated in 1976 with the work being done by PT Propelat involving around 300 workers. Almost all of the stadium was reconstructed including a new pitch to fit international standards with green carpet grass being imported from Australia. The stadium was reopened at 20 May 1976 at the 30th anniversary of Kodam III/SIliwangi by Major General Himawan Sutanto, the commander of the division at that time.

== Notable events ==
In 1961, the stadium was chosen as the host of the fifth edition of Pekan Olahraga Nasional which was opened by President Sukarno.

On 11 June 1987, Dutch champions PSV Eindhoven held a friendly match against Persib Bandung at Siliwangi Stadium. The match was witnessed by approximately 25,000 Bobotoh who filled the stadium stands as PSV won 6–0.

This stadium was also the venue for the famous Bandung derby in the 1990s to 2000s. On 5 May 2002, this stadium witnessed a landslide victory of 5–0 between Persib Bandung and their rivals, Persikab Bandung.
