= Liga Indonesia Premier Division =

Defunct second tier, and former top flight of Indonesian football

- Founded: 1994; 32 years ago
- Folded: 2017
- Country: Indonesia
- Confederation: AFC
- Number of clubs: 55
- Level on pyramid: 1 (1994–2008); 2 (2008–2015)
- Promotion to: Indonesia Super League (2008–2015)
- Relegation to: First Division
- Domestic cup: Piala Indonesia
- Last champions: 1st tier: Sriwijaya (2007–08); 2nd tier: Pusamania Borneo (2014)
- Most championships: Persebaya Surabaya; Persik Kediri (2 each)
- Broadcaster(s): First Media, Big TV

Liga Indonesia Premier Division (Indonesian: Divisi Utama Liga Indonesia) was the second-tier of the football competition system in Indonesia, organized by the PSSI. The competition started in 1994 as a top-tier division, prior to the formation of the Indonesia Super League in 2008. In its time as a top-flight league, the competition used to be contested by 28 to 36 teams divided into 2 groups. The top four teams from each group would advance to the second stage where they were placed in a group of four teams, with the top two advancing to the knockout stage. After the establishment of the Liga 2 in 2017, the Premier Division was dissolved.

== History ==
In 1994, the PSSI merged the existing Perserikatan and Galatama to form Liga Indonesia. This decision was taken to increase the quality of Indonesian football. In order to do so, PSSI sought to combine supporter's fanaticism from Perserikatan and Galatama's professionalism. The Premier Division was the first-tier in Liga Indonesia. The system stayed put until 2007.

In 2008, PSSI formed the Indonesia Super League (ISL), the first fully professional league in Indonesia, as the new top-tier of Indonesian football. The Premier Division was then being relegated to the second-tier.

As a result of continuing conflict between PT Liga Indonesia (LI) and PT Liga Prima Indonesia Sportindo (LPIS), there were two different Liga Indonesia Premier Division being organized for 2011–12 and 2013 season, one for the Indonesia Super League and the other for Indonesian Premier League. Starting in the 2014 season Premier Division was organized again by PT Liga Indonesia after the dissolution of LPIS.

In January 2017, PSSI renamed the competition from Premier Division to Liga 2 along with the change in the name of the league in the top division from Indonesia Super League to Liga 1.

== First-tier era ==
=== Champions ===
Season	Champions	Score	Runners-up
1994–95	Persib Bandung	1–0	Petrokimia Putra
1995–96	Bandung Raya	2–0	PSM Makassar
1996–97	Persebaya Surabaya	3–1	Bandung Raya
1997–98	Season abandoned due to political and economic turmoil		
1998–99	PSIS Semarang	1–0	Persebaya Surabaya
1999–2000	PSM Makassar	3–2	Pupuk Kaltim
2001	Persija Jakarta	3–2	PSM Makassar
2002	Petrokimia Putra	2–1 (g.g.)	Persita Tangerang
2003	Persik Kediri	–	PSM Makassar
2004	Persebaya Surabaya	–	PSM Makassar
2005	Persipura Jayapura	3–2 (a.e.t.)	Persija Jakarta
2006	Persik Kediri	1–0 (a.e.t.)	PSIS Semarang
2007–08	Sriwijaya	3–1 (a.e.t.)	PSMS Medan

=== Title sponsors ===
Period	Sponsor(s)	Brand	Ref.
1994–1996	Dunhill	Liga Dunhill	
1996–1997	Kansas	Liga Kansas	
1997–1999	No sponsors	Ligina (Liga Indonesia)	
1999–2004	Bank Mandiri	Liga Bank Mandiri	
2005–2008	Djarum Super	Liga Djarum Indonesia	

=== Broadcasting partner ===
- TVRI (1994–2002)
- ANTV (1994–1999, 2002–2007)
- RCTI (1999–2001)
- SCTV (2003)
- Trans TV (2004)
- TV7 (2004–2006)

=== Player of the season ===
Season	Player	Team
1994–95	(Indonesia) Widodo C. Putro	Petrokimia Putra
1995–96	(Indonesia) Ronny Wabia	Persipura Jayapura
1996–97	(Indonesia) Nuralim	Bandung Raya
1998–99	(Indonesia) Ali Sunan	PSIS Semarang
1999–2000	(Indonesia) Bima Sakti	PSM Makassar
2001	(Indonesia) Bambang Pamungkas	Persija Jakarta
2002	(Indonesia) Ilham Jaya Kesuma	Persita Tangerang
2003	(Indonesia) Musikan	Persik Kediri
2004	(Indonesia) Ponaryo Astaman	PSM Makassar
2005	(Indonesia) Christian Warobay	Persipura Jayapura
2006	(Indonesia) Maman Abdurrahman	PSIS Semarang
2007–08	(Liberia) Zah Rahan Krangar	Sriwijaya

=== Top scorers ===
Season	Top scorer	Team	Goals
1994–95	(Indonesia) Peri Sandria	Bandung Raya	34
1995–96	(Montenegro) Dejan Gluscevic	Bandung Raya	30
1996–97	(Brazil) Jacksen F. Tiago	Persebaya Surabaya	26
1997–98	(Indonesia) Kurniawan Dwi Yulianto	Pelita Jaya	20
1998–99	(Gabon) Alain Mabenda	PSDS Deli Serdang	11
1999–2000	(Indonesia) Bambang Pamungkas	Persija Jakarta	24
2001	(Cameroon) Sadissou Bako	Barito Putera	22
2002	(Indonesia) Ilham Jaya Kesuma	Persita Tangerang	26
2003	(Chile) Oscar Aravena	PSM Makassar	31
2004	(Indonesia) Ilham Jaya Kesuma	Persita Tangerang	22
2005	(Uruguay) Cristian Gonzáles	Persik Kediri	25
2006	(Uruguay) Cristian Gonzáles	Persik Kediri	29
2007–08	(Uruguay) Cristian Gonzáles	Persik Kediri	32

== Second-tier era ==
=== Champions ===
Season	Champions	Score	Runners-up
2008–09	Persisam Putra Samarinda	1–0	Persema Malang
2009–10	Persibo Bojonegoro	0–0 (a.e.t.) (3–1 p)	Deltras Sidoarjo
2010–11	Persiba Bantul	1–0	Persiraja Banda Aceh
2011–12 (LPIS)	Persepar Palangkaraya	round robin	Pro Duta
2011–12 (LI)	Barito Putera	2–1	Persita Tanggerang
2013 (LPIS)	PSS Sleman	2–1	Lampung FC
2013 (LI)	Persebaya DU	2–0	Perseru Serui
2014	Pusamania Borneo	2–1	Persiwa Wamena
2015	Season abandoned due to FIFA suspension of Indonesia		

=== Title sponsors ===
Period	Sponsor(s)	Brand	Ref.
2008–2009	Esia	Esia Divisi Utama	
2009–2010	Extra Joss	Liga Joss Indonesia	
2010–2011	Ti-Phone	Liga Ti-Phone	
2012–2016	No sponsors	Divisi Utama	

=== Broadcasting partner ===
- ANTV (2008–2013)
- tvOne (2013)
- First Media and Big TV (2014)

=== Player of the season ===
Season	Player	Team
2008–09	(Paraguay) Aldo Baretto	Persisam Putra Samarinda
2009–10	(Brazil) Victor da Silva	Persibo Bojonegoro
2010–11	(Indonesia) Wahyu Wijiastanto	Persiba Bantul
2011–12 (LPIS)	(Nigeria) George Oyebode Oyedepo	Persepar Palangkaraya
2011–12 (LI)	(Chile) Cristian Carrasco	Persita Tangerang
2013 (LPIS)	Not awarded	
2013 (LI)	(Cameroon) Jean Paul Boumsong	Persebaya (DU)
2014	(Liberia) Sengbah Kennedy	Persiwa Wamena

=== Top scorers ===
Season	Top scorer	Team	Goals
2008–09	(Cameroon) Herman Dzumafo Epandi (Cameroon) Jean Paul Boumsong (Indonesia) Mardiansyah	PSPS Pekanbaru; Persikad Depok; Persikabo Bogor	17
2009–10	(Liberia) Edward Junior Wilson	Semen Padang	20
2010–11	(Nigeria) Udo Fortune	Persiba Bantul	34
2011–12 (LPIS)	(Liberia) Abel Cielo	Perseman Manokwari	11
2011–12 (LI)	(Liberia) Sackie Teah Doe	Barito Putera	18
2013 (LPIS)	Not awarded		
2013 (LI)	(Cameroon) Jean Paul Boumsong (Liberia) Oliver Makor	Persebaya (DU); Persik Kediri	18
2014	(Liberia) Yao Rudy Abblode	Persiwa Wamena	17

== See also ==
- Indonesian football league system
- Liga 1 (Indonesia)
- Liga 2 (Indonesia)
