= Assyabaab Surabaya =

Defunct association football club in Indonesia

- Full name: Assyabaab Surabaya
- Nickname: The Green Shark
- Founded: 1930 as An-Nasher; 1948 as Assyabaab
- Dissolved: 1997
- Ground: Gelora 10 November Stadium
- 1996–97: 10th in East Group

Assyabaab Salim Group Surabaya, commonly known as Assyabaab Surabaya or ASGS, was a professional football club from Surabaya, Indonesia.

== History ==
The club founded in 1930 in Ampel, Surabaya as Al-Nasher and joined NIVB competition in 1932 and later changed their name to Al-Faouz during Japanese occupation. In 1948, the club changed their name to Assyabaab; it is a nickname for Arab descent at that place, since most of the founder is the Arab descent. Assyabaab was one of the best club in Indonesian football at 1960–1970 era. At that era, many of Indonesia national football team player like Mohamed Zein Alhadad come from this club. Some players also played in Hong Kong after they played for Assyabaab. Later the club performance decrease.

After two decade hiatus from top-tier Indonesian football, Assyabaab promoted to the top level at Galatama on 1991. Later the club bought by Salim Group, and was renamed Assyabaab Salim Grup Surabaya. Consequently, they have better facility, and their performance increase. They can hold in top-tier football league for several years. They advanced to the quarter-final at the 1994–1995 Liga Indonesia Premier Division.

== Name changes ==
- An-Nasher (1930–43)
- Al-Faouz (1943–48)
- Assyabaab (1948–91)
- Assyabaab Salim Group (1991–97)

== Season-by-season records ==
Season	League/Division	Tms.	Pos.	Piala Indonesia
1990	Galatama First Division	7	1	–
1991–92	Galatama Premier Division	20	13	–
1992–93	Galatama Premier Division	17	4	–
1993–94	Galatama Premier Division	17	3rd, East division	–
1994–95	Premier Division	34	3rd, Second round	–
1995–96	Premier Division	31	9th, East Division	–
1996–97	Premier Division	33	10th, East division	–
