= Bandung Raya =

Indonesian football club (1987–1997)

- Full name: Bandung Raya Football Club
- Nickname: Maung Totol (The Leopards)
- Founded: 17 June 1987; 39 years ago
- Dissolved: 1997; 29 years ago
- Ground: Siliwangi Stadium
- Owner: Ari D. Sutedi
- Chairman: Ari D. Sutedi
- League: Liga Indonesia Premier Division
- 1996–1997: Runner-up
Home colours	Away colours

Bandung Raya Football Club was an Indonesian professional association football club based in Bandung, West Java. The club was founded on 17 June 1987. It played in Galatama until the formation of the Liga Indonesia Premier Division in 1994, playing in that division until the club was dissolved in 1997 owing to financial difficulties.

== History ==
Bandung Raya was founded in Bandung on 17 June 1987. It competed in Galatama until 1994 when the Football Association of Indonesia merged the two top-tier leagues (Galatama and Perserikatan) into Liga Indonesia Premier Division. While Bandung Raya mostly ended in mid-table positions in Galatama, its best performances were manifested in the Liga Indonesia Premier Division, in which the club won once and finished as runner-up once.

In 1994–95, Bandung Raya finished third in the West Division and advanced to the quarterfinals, which were played as a group stage. The team finished third and did not advance to the semi-finals. Bandung Raya's striker Peri Sandria was the league's top goalscorer, with 34 goals in 37 matches.

In the 1995–96 Liga Indonesia Premier Division, Bandung Raya won its Conference and advanced to the quarterfinals, finishing at the top of its group. Bandung Raya secured the championship by beating Mitra Surabaya in a penalty shoot-out in the semi-finals and PSM Makassar 2–0 in the finals. The club's striker, Dejan Gluščević, was the league's top goalscorer with 30 goals in 33 matches.

The following year Bandung Raya was runner-up in the 1996–97 Liga Indonesia Premier Division, after losing 1–3 against Persebaya Surabaya in the finals. Bandung Raya's defender Nuralim was named as the league's best player of the season. This was the club's last match, as it was dissolved at the end of the season due to financial difficulties. Most of the players moved to Persija Jakarta.

Bandung Raya competed in the Asian Cup Winners Cup in 1996–97, reaching the second round by beating Malaysian club Pahang FA 5–1 on aggregate. Bandung Raya was eliminated after losing 1–5 on aggregate against South China AA from Hong Kong.

It was suggested that Bandung Football Club, founded in 2010 for the short-lived Liga Primer Indonesia, was a reborn Bandung Raya, although both teams denied any relationship. Ari Dewanto Sutedi would later revive the "Bandung Raya" name by purchasing Pelita Jaya, then based in Karawang and owned by Bakrie Group, in 2012 and moving it to Bandung (as Pelita Bandung Raya and later Persipasi Bandung Raya) until 2016; some confusingly consider the current Madura United, the club emerged from the sell-off, as "merger" of the old Bandung Raya and the Pelita club for this reason.

== Chairman ==
- 1987–1997: Tri Goestoro

== Season-by-season records ==
Season	League/Division	Tms.	Pos.	Piala Indonesia	AFC Competition(s)	
1987–88	Galatama Premier Division	14	14th	–	–	–
1988–89	Galatama Premier Division	18	7th	–	–	–
1990	Galatama Premier Division	18	17th	–	–	–
1990–92	Galatama Premier Division	20	17th	–	–	–
1992–93	Galatama Premier Division	17	6th	–	–	–
1993–94	Galatama Premier Division	17	8th, West division	–	–	–
1994–95	Premier Division	34	3rd, Second round	–	–	–
1995–96	Premier Division	31	1st	–	–	–
1996–97	Premier Division	33	2nd	–	Asian Cup Winners' Cup	Round of 16

== Performance in AFC competitions ==
Season	Competition	Round	Nat.	Club	Home	Away
1996–97	Asian Cup Winners' Cup	First round	(Malaysia)	Pahang	4–1	1–0
1996–97	Asian Cup Winners' Cup	Second round	(Hong Kong)	South China	1–1	0–4

== Stadium ==
Bandung Raya played their home matches at Siliwangi Stadium, which has a capacity of 20,000 seats. The club shared the stadium with its local rival Persib Bandung.

== Supporters ==
Bandung Raya's supporters are called "Baraya" which means family. sometimes Bandung people support Persib and Bandung Raya because both have good achievements.

== Honours ==
- Champion of Liga Indonesia Premier Division in 1995–1996
- Runner-up of Liga Indonesia Premier Division in 1996–1997

== Notable coach's ==
Year	Manager
1994–1995	(Indonesia) Nandar Iskandar
1995–1996	(Netherlands) Henk Wullems
1996–1997	(Netherlands) Albert Fafie

Bold is winning manager of Indonesian League
