= 1995–96 Liga Indonesia First Division =

Liga Indonesia First Division
- Season: 1995–96
- Dates: 1995 – 2 July 1996
- Champions: PSP
- Promoted: PSP; Persedikab; PSB; PSBL
- Relegated: PS Aceh Putra

The 1995–96 Liga Indonesia First Division (known as Divisi Satu Liga Dunhill for sponsorship reasons) was the second season of the Liga Indonesia First Division, the second-tier division of Indonesian football operating below the Liga Indonesia Premier Division. The season began in 1995 and ended on 2 July 1996. PSP won the title after defeating Persedikab 4–2 in the final.

== Teams ==
=== Team changes ===
The number of teams increased from 16 to 21 this season.

==== From First Division ====
Promoted to Premier Division

- Persikab
- Persma

Relegated to Second Division

- PSA
- PSGC

==== To First Division ====
Promoted from Second Division

- Persikabo
- Persiter
- PSPS
- PSB

Relegated from Premier Division

- PS Bengkulu
- Warna Agung
- PSIR
- PSIM
- PS Aceh Putra

=== Name changes ===
- Warna Agung changed their name to Serang Jaya Warna Agung after merging with Serang Jaya

=== Stadiums and locations ===
Locations of the teams in the 1995–96 Liga Indonesia First Division.
Blue: West; Green: Central I; Yellow: Central II; Red: East

Team	Location	Stadium	Capacity
Perseden	Denpasar	Kompyang Sujana	7,000
Persedikab	Kediri	Canda Bhirawa	3,000
Persibri	Batanghari	KONI Batanghari	10,000
Persidafon	Jayapura	Barnabas Youwe	15,000
Persijap	Jepara	Kamal Djunaedi	15,000
Persikabo	Bogor	Pajajaran	12,000
Persis	Surakarta	Sriwedari	12,000
Persiss	Sorong	Wombik	7,000
Persitara	Jakarta (North Jakarta)	Tugu	4,000
Persiter	Ternate	Gelora Kie Raha	15,000
PS Aceh Putra	Banda Aceh	Harapan Bangsa	18,000
PS Bengkulu	Bengkulu	Semarak	10,000
PSB	Bogor	Pajajaran	12,000
PSBL	Bandar Lampung	Pahoman	15,000
PSIM	Yogyakarta	Mandala Krida	25,000
PSIR	Rembang	Krida	10,000
PSJS	Jakarta (South Jakarta)	Lebak Bulus	12,500
PSP	Padang	Gelora Haji Agus Salim	11,000
PSPS	Pekanbaru	Hang Tuah	5,000
PSSB	Bireuën	Cot Gapu	15,000
Serang Jaya Warna Agung	Serang	Maulana Yusuf	15,000

=== Kits and sponsorship ===
All of the teams kits are provided by Adidas and sponsored by Dunhill as part of the league's sponsorship deal.

== First stage ==
A total of 21 clubs participated in this season divided into four groups based on their regions: West, Central I, Central II, and East.

=== West ===
Pos	Team	Pld	W	D	L	GF	GA	GD	Pts	Qualification
1	PSP	10	6	3	1	16	5	+11	21	Advance to second stage
2	PSSB	10	4	4	2	11	5	+6	16	Advance to second stage
3	PSPS	10	4	3	3	13	11	+2	15	
4	Persibri	10	5	0	5	13	17	−4	15	
5	PS Bengkulu	10	3	1	6	10	13	−3	10	
6	PS Aceh Putra	10	2	1	7	6	18	−12	7	Qualification to relegation play-offs

Source: Arsip Sepakbola Indonesia

=== Central I ===
Pos	Team	Pld	W	D	L	GF	GA	GD	Pts	Qualification
1	PSBL	8	4	3	1	17	5	+12	15	Advance to second stage
2	Persis	8	3	4	1	14	7	+7	13	Advance to second stage
3	Persikabo	8	3	3	2	5	6	−1	12	
4	PSIR	8	2	3	3	10	15	−5	9	
5	Persitara	8	0	3	5	4	17	−13	3	Qualification to relegation play-offs

Source: Arsip Sepakbola Indonesia

=== Central II ===
Pos	Team	Pld	W	D	L	GF	GA	GD	Pts	Qualification
1	PSB	8	4	3	1	12	5	+7	15	Advance to second stage
2	Persijap	8	3	3	2	10	11	−1	12	Advance to second stage
3	Serang Jaya Warna Agung	8	2	4	2	8	7	+1	10	
4	PSJS	8	2	3	3	8	8	0	9	
5	PSIM	8	2	1	5	7	14	−7	7	Qualification to relegation play-offs

Source: Arsip Sepakbola Indonesia

=== East ===
Pos	Team	Pld	W	D	L	GF	GA	GD	Pts	Qualification
1	Persedikab	8	5	1	2	17	9	+8	16	Advance to second stage
2	Persidafon	8	5	1	2	11	7	+4	16	Advance to second stage
3	Perseden	8	4	2	2	14	8	+6	14	
4	Persiter	8	3	1	4	8	13	−5	10	
5	Persiss	8	0	1	7	6	19	−13	1	Qualification to relegation play-offs

Source: Arsip Sepakbola Indonesia

== Second stage ==
The second stage was played from 22 to 27 June 1996. The matches were held at Gelora Haji Agus Salim Stadium in Padang.

=== Group A ===
Pos	Team	Pld	W	D	L	GF	GA	GD	Pts	Qualification
1	PSP	3	2	1	0	6	1	+5	7	Advance to knockout stage
2	PSB	3	1	1	1	2	1	+1	4	Advance to knockout stage
3	Persidafon	3	1	0	2	1	3	−2	3	
4	Persis	3	1	0	2	2	6	−4	3	

Source: Arsip Sepakbola Indonesia

=== Group B ===
Pos	Team	Pld	W	D	L	GF	GA	GD	Pts	Qualification
1	Persedikab	3	3	0	0	6	0	+6	9	Advance to knockout stage
2	PSBL	3	1	0	2	2	3	−1	3	Advance to knockout stage
3	Persijap	3	1	0	2	1	2	−1	3	
4	PSSB	3	1	0	2	2	6	−4	3	

Source: Arsip Sepakbola Indonesia

== Knockout stage ==
Semifinals
30 June – Padang
PSP	8
PSBL	0
30 June – Padang
Persedikab	1
PSB	0

Final
2 July – Padang
PSP	4
Persedikab	2
Match for third place
2 July – Padang
PSBL	2
PSB	1

=== Semifinals ===
The winners are promoted to the Premier Division while the losers qualify for the promotion play-offs.

30 June 1996

Persedikab	1–0	PSB
Herman Kubin	Report

Gelora Haji Agus Salim Stadium, Padang

30 June 1996

PSP	8–0	PSBL
	Report

Gelora Haji Agus Salim Stadium, Padang

=== Match for third place ===
2 July 1996

PSBL	2–1	PSB
	Report

Gelora Haji Agus Salim Stadium, Padang

=== Final ===
2 July 1996

PSP	4–2	Persedikab
	Report

Gelora Haji Agus Salim Stadium, Padang

== Promotion play-offs ==
No recorded information on the promotion play-offs match results but based on available information, PSB and PSBL won promotion to the Premier Division as Persegres were relegated to the First Division. BPD Jateng withdrew from the competition before the play-offs began.

Team	Qualification
PSB (P)	Promotion to Premier Division
PSBL (P)	Promotion to Premier Division
Persegres (R)	Relegation to First Division
BPD Jateng (R)	Withdrew

Source: Arsip Sepakbola Indonesia
(P) Promoted; (R) Relegated

== Relegation play-offs ==
=== First round ===
No recorded information on the match results in first round of the relegation play-offs but based on available information, Persitara and PSIM retain their First Division status while PS Aceh Putra and Persiss progress to the next round.

Team	Qualification
Persitara	
PSIM
PS Aceh Putra	Advance to second round
Persiss	Advance to second round

Source: Arsip Sepakbola Indonesia

=== Second round ===
No recorded information on the match results in the second round of the relegation play-offs but based on available information, Persiss successfully retained their First Division status while PSS were promoted to the second-tier competition. PS Aceh Putra were relegated to the Second Division while Persipal failed to win promotion and remain in the third-tier competition.

Team	Qualification
Persiss	First Division
PSS (P)	First Division
PS Aceh Putra (R)	Second Division
Persipal	Second Division

Source: Arsip Sepakbola Indonesia
(P) Promoted; (R) Relegated

== See also ==
- 1995–96 Liga Indonesia Premier Division
- 1995–96 Liga Indonesia Second Division
