= 1996–97 Liga Indonesia First Division =

Football league season

Liga Indonesia Premier Division
- Season: 1996–97
- Dates: November 1996 – 24 July 1997
- Champions: Persikota
- Promoted: Persikota; PSIM; Persikabo
- Relegated: Persegres; PS Bengkulu; Serang Jaya Warna Agung

The 1996–97 Liga Indonesia First Division (known as Divisi Satu Liga Kansas for sponsorship reasons) was the third season of the Liga Indonesia First Division, the second-tier division of Indonesian football operating below the Liga Indonesia Premier Division. The season began in November 1996 and ended on 24 July 1997. Persikota won the title after defeating PSIM 3–1 in the final.

== Teams ==
=== Team changes ===
The number of teams decreased from 21 to 20 this season.

==== From First Division ====
Promoted to Premier Division

- PSP
- Persedikab
- PSB
- PSBL

Relegated to Second Division

- PS Aceh Putra

==== To First Division ====
Promoted from Second Division

- Persikota
- Persewangi
- PSS

Relegated from Premier Division

- Persegres

=== Stadiums and locations ===
Locations of the teams in the 1996–97 Liga Indonesia First Division.
Blue: West; Green: Central I; Yellow: Central II; Orange: Central III; Red: East

| Team | Location | Stadium | Capacity |
|---|---|---|---|
| Perseden | Denpasar | Kompyang Sujana | 7,000 |
| Persegres | Gresik | Petrokimia | 20,000 |
| Persewangi | Banyuwangi | Diponegoro | 15,000 |
| Persibri | Batanghari | KONI Batanghari | 10,000 |
| Persidafon | Jayapura | Barnabas Youwe | 15,000 |
| Persijap | Jepara | Kamal Djunaedi | 15,000 |
| Persikabo | Bogor | Pajajaran | 12,000 |
| Persikota | Tangerang | Benteng | 7,500 |
| Persis | Surakarta | Sriwedari | 12,000 |
| Persiss | Sorong | Wombik | 7,000 |
| Persitara | Jakarta (North Jakarta) | Tugu | 4,000 |
| Persiter | Ternate | Gelora Kie Raha | 15,000 |
| PS Bengkulu | Bengkulu | Semarak | 10,000 |
| PSIM | Yogyakarta | Mandala Krida | 25,000 |
| PSIR | Rembang | Krida | 10,000 |
| PSJS | Jakarta (South Jakarta) | Lebak Bulus | 12,500 |
| PSPS | Pekanbaru | Hang Tuah | 5,000 |
| PSS | Sleman | Tridadi | 12,000 |
| PSSB | Bireuën | Cot Gapu | 15,000 |
| Serang Jaya Warna Agung | Serang | Maulana Yusuf | 15,000 |

== First stage ==
A total of 20 clubs participated in this season divided into five groups based on their regions: West, Central I, Central II, Central III, and East.

=== West ===
| Team | Qualification |
|---|---|
| PSSB | Advance to second stage |
| PSPS | Advance to second stage |
| Persibri | |
| PS Bengkulu | Qualification for relegation play-offs |

Source: Arsip Sepakbola Indonesia

=== Central I ===
| Team | Qualification |
|---|---|
| Persikabo | Advance to second stage |
| PSS | Advance to second stage |
| PSJS | |
| Persewangi | Qualification for relegation play-offs |

Source: Arsip Sepakbola Indonesia

=== Central II ===
| Team | Qualification |
|---|---|
| Persikota | Advance to second stage |
| Perseden | Advance to second stage |
| Persijap | |
| Persegres | Qualification for relegation play-offs |

Source: Arsip Sepakbola Indonesia

=== Central III ===
| Team | Qualification |
|---|---|
| Persitara | Advance to second stage |
| PSIM | Advance to second stage |
| Persis | |
| Serang Jaya Warna Agung | Qualification for relegation play-offs |

Source: Arsip Sepakbola Indonesia

=== East ===
| Team | Qualification |
|---|---|
| Persiter | Advance to second stage |
| Persidafon | Advance to second stage |
| PSIR | |
| Persiss | Qualification for relegation play-offs |

Source: Arsip Sepakbola Indonesia

=== Relegation play-offs ===
No recorded information on the match results in the relegation play-offs but based on available information, the relegated teams were Persegres, PS Bengkulu, and Serang Jaya Warna Agung.

| Team | Relegation |
|---|---|
| Persiter | |
Persidafon
| Persegres (R) | Relegation to Second Division |
| PS Bengkulu (R) | Relegation to Second Division |
| Serang Jaya Warna Agung (R) | Relegation to Second Division |

Source: Arsip Sepakbola Indonesia
(R) Relegated

== Second stage ==
The second stage was played from 7 to 14 July 1997.

=== Group A ===
All matches were held at Mandala Krida Stadium in Yogyakarta.

| Pos | Team | Pld | W | D | L | GF | GA | GD | Pts | Qualification |
|---|---|---|---|---|---|---|---|---|---|---|
| 1 | PSIM (H) | 4 | 3 | 1 | 0 | 7 | 0 | +7 | 10 | Advance to knockout stage |
| 2 | Persikota | 4 | 2 | 1 | 1 | 11 | 6 | +5 | 7 | Advance to knockout stage |
| 3 | PSS | 4 | 2 | 0 | 2 | 4 | 4 | 0 | 6 | |
| 4 | Persiter | 4 | 2 | 0 | 2 | 7 | 8 | −1 | 6 | |
| 5 | PSSB | 4 | 0 | 0 | 4 | 2 | 13 | −11 | 0 | |

Source: RSSSF
(H) Hosts

=== Group B ===
All matches were at Ngurah Rai Stadium in Denpasar.

| Pos | Team | Pld | W | D | L | GF | GA | GD | Pts | Qualification |
|---|---|---|---|---|---|---|---|---|---|---|
| 1 | Perseden (H) | 4 | 3 | 1 | 0 | 6 | 1 | +5 | 10 | Advance to knockout stage |
| 2 | Persikabo | 4 | 1 | 3 | 0 | 7 | 2 | +5 | 6 | Advance to knockout stage |
| 3 | PSPS | 4 | 1 | 1 | 2 | 3 | 4 | −1 | 4 | |
| 4 | Persidafon | 4 | 1 | 1 | 2 | 4 | 7 | −3 | 4 | |
| 5 | Persitara | 4 | 1 | 0 | 3 | 2 | 8 | −6 | 3 | |

Source: RSSSF
(H) Hosts

== Knockout stage ==
Semifinals
22 July – Yogyakarta
PSIM | 2
Persikabo | 1
22 July – Yogyakarta
Persikota | 1
Perseden | 0

Final
24 July – Yogyakarta
PSIM | 1
Persikota | 3
Match for third place
24 July – Yogyakarta
Persikabo | 4
Perseden | 0

=== Semifinals ===
The winners are promoted to the Premier Division.

22 July 1997

| PSIM | 2–1 | Persikabo |
|---|---|---|
| Rofik Ismanto 23'; Bambang Sumantri 89' | Report | Bambock Justin L. 41' |

Mandala Krida Stadium, Yogyakarta

22 July 1997

| Persikota | 1–0 | Perseden |
|---|---|---|
| Nova Zaenal 69' | Report |

Mandala Krida Stadium, Yogyakarta

=== Match for third place ===
The winner is promoted to the Premier Division.

24 July 1997

| Persikabo | 4–0 | Perseden |
|---|---|---|
| Ntese John Lungu 19', 30', 74'; Agus Sutiono 70' | Report |

Mandala Krida Stadium, Yogyakarta

=== Final ===
24 July 1997

| PSIM | 1–3 | Persikota |
|---|---|---|
| Bambang Sumantri 71' (pen.) | Report | Ali Shaha 6'; Francis Yonga 12', 56' |

Mandala Krida Stadium, Yogyakarta

== See also ==
- 1996–97 Liga Indonesia Premier Division
- 1996–97 Liga Indonesia Second Division
