= List of Super League (Indonesia) clubs =

The following is a list of clubs who have played in the Super League since its formation in 2008.

== Table ==
All statistics here refer to time in the Super League only, with the exception of 'Most Recent Finish' (which refers to all levels of play) and 'Last Promotion' (which refers to the club's last promotion from the second tier of Indonesian football). Super League teams playing in the current season or confirmed for the next season are indicated in bold, while founding members of the Super League are shown in italics. A 'spell' refers to a number of consecutive seasons within the league, uninterrupted by relegation. If the longest spell is the current spell, this is shown in bold, and if the highest finish is that of the most recent season, then this is also shown in bold.

Club	Location	Total seasons	Total spells	Longest spell	Most recent promotion	Most recent relegation	Total seasons absent	Seasons	Most recent finish	Highest finish
**Arema** (Note: Arema Indonesia (2008–2013), Arema Cronus (2014–2015))	Malang Regency	17	1	**17**	2004	Never relegated	0	**2008–**	9th	1st
Badak Lampung (Note: Perseru (2014–2018))	Bandar Lampung	5	1	5	2013	2019	12	2014–2019	Defunct (2023)	8th East Region in 2014
**Bali United** (Note: Persisam Putra (2009–2013), Putra Samarinda (2014))	Gianyar Regency	16	1	**16**	2008–09	Never relegated	1	**2009–**	8th	1st
Barito Putera	Banjarmasin	11	1	11	2011–12	2024–25	6	2013–2025	Championship; 3rd in Group 2	6th
**Bhayangkara Presisi** (Note: Persebaya ISL (2014–2015), Bhayangkara (2017–2023))	Bandar Lampung	11	2	9	2024–25	2023–24	6	2014–2024; **2025–**	5th	1st
Bontang (Note: PKT Bontang (2008–2009))	Bontang	3	1	3	Galatama	2010–11	14	2008–2011	Defunct (2018)	11th
**Borneo Samarinda** (Note: Pusamania Borneo (2014–2015), Borneo (2017–2022))	Samarinda	11	1	**11**	2014	Never relegated	6	**2015–**	**2nd**	2nd
Deltras	Sidoarjo Regency	3	2	2	2009–10	2011–12	14	2008–2009; 2010–2012	Championship; 5th in Group 2	13th
**Dewa United Banten** (Note: Dewa United (2022–2025))	Serang Regency	5	1	**5**	2021	Never relegated	12	**2022–**	7th	2nd
**Garudayaksa**	Bogor Regency	1	1	1	2025–26	Never relegated	16	**2026–**	Championship; 1st (promoted)	–
Gresik United	Gresik Regency	5	1	5	2010–11	2017	12	2011–2017	Liga Nusantara; 4th in Group D	9th West Region in 2014
**Isenmulang Kalteng**	Palangka Raya	1	1	1	2025–26	Never relegated	16	**2026–**	Championship; 3rd (promoted)	–
**Java United** (Note: Malut United (2024–2026))	Semarang	3	1	**3**	2023–24	Never relegated	14	**2024–**	6th	3rd
Kalteng Putra	Palangka Raya	1	1	1	2018	2019	16	2019	Defunct (2025)	18th (relegated)
**Madura United** (Note: Pelita Jaya (2008–2012), Pelita Bandung Raya (2013–2014), Persipasi Bandung Raya (2015))	Pamekasan Regency	17	1	**17**	2006	Never relegated	0	**2008–**	14th	2nd Lost final in 2024
Mitra Kukar	Kutai Kartanegara Regency	6	1	6	2010–11	2018	11	2011–2018	Defunct (2024)	3rd Reached second stage in 2014 (ranked 3rd in Group B)
**Persebaya**	Surabaya	10	2	**9**	2017	2009–10	7	2009–2010; **2018–**	4th	2nd
Persela	Lamongan Regency	12	1	12	2003	2021–22	5	2008–2022	Championship; 6th in Group 2	4th Reached second stage in 2014 (ranked 4th in Group A)
Persema	Malang	1	1	1	2008–09 → To IPL	2010–11; Withdrew	16	2009–2010	Liga 4; 4th in Group JJ of third round (East Java)	10th
Persepam	Pamekasan Regency	2	1	2	2011–12	2014	15	2013–2014	Liga 4; 4th in Group DD of third round (national phase)	10th East Region in 2014 (relegated)
**Persib**	Bandung	17	1	**17**	Founding member, no promotion	Never relegated	0	**2008–**	**1st**	1st Won final in 2014 and 2024
Persiba Balikpapan	Balikpapan	8	1	8	2004	2017	9	2008–2017	Championship; Won relegation play-off	3rd
Persiba Bantul	Bantul Regency	1	1	1	2010–11 → To IPL	2014 → From IPL	16	2014	Liga Nusantara; 4th	11th East Region in 2014 (relegated)
Persidafon	Jayapura Regency	2	1	2	2010–11	2013	15	2011–2013	Liga 4; 3rd (Papua)	10th
**Persija**	Jakarta (Central Jakarta)	17	1	**17**	Founding member, no promotion	Never relegated	0	**2008–**	3rd	1st
**Persijap**	Jepara Regency	6	3	3	2024–25	2014 → From IPL	11	2008–2011; 2014; **2025–**	13th	9th
**Persik**	Kediri	10	3	**7**	2019	2014	7	2008–2010; 2014; **2020–**	12th	4th
Persikabo 1973 (Note: Persiram (2011–2015), PS TNI (2017), PS TIRA (2018), TIRA-Persikabo (2019–2020))	Bogor Regency	11	1	11	2010–11	2023–24	6	2011–2024	Liga Nusantara; Withdrew (relegated)	8th
Persipura	Jayapura	12	1	12	Founding member, no promotion	2021–22	5	2008–2022	Championship; 4th	1st
Persiraja	Banda Aceh	2	1	2	2019	2021–22	15	2020–2022	Championship; 5th in Group 1	7th League didn't finish in 2020
Persis	Surakarta	4	1	4	2021	2025–26	13	2022–2026	16th (relegated)	7th
**Persita**	Tangerang Regency	10	3	**7**	2019	2014	7	2008–2009; 2013–2014; **2020–**	10th	9th
Persitara	Jakarta (North Jakarta)	2	1	2	2005	2009–10	15	2008–2010	Liga Nusantara; Won relegation play-off	14th
Persiwa (Note: Persiwa merged with Bina Putra in 2018.)	Jayawijaya Regency	5	1	5	2005	2013	12	2008–2013	Defunct (2018)	2nd
PSAP	Pidie Regency	1	1	1	2010–11	2011–12	16	2011–2012	Liga 4; 4th in Group N of first round (national phase)	18th (relegated)
PSBS	Biak Numfor Regency	2	1	2	2023–24	2025–26	15	2024–2026	18th (relegated)	9th
**PSIM**	Yogyakarta (Note: No stadium is available in Yogyakarta since the Mandala Krida Stadium does not meet the requirements for the Super League, therefore PSIM Yogyakarta plays their home matches at the Sultan Agung Stadium, the home of Persiba Bantul.)	2	1	**2**	2024–25	Never relegated	15	**2025–**	11th	11th
PSIS	Semarang	8	2	7	2017	2024–25	9	2008–2009; 2018–2025	Championship; 8th in Group 2	6th
**PSM**	Makassar (Note: No stadium is available in Makassar since the demolition of the Andi Mattalatta Stadium, therefore PSM Makassar plays their home games at the Gelora B.J. Habibie Stadium, the home of Persipare Parepare.)	14	2	**12**	Founding member, no promotion → To IPL	Never relegated → From IPL	3	2008–2010; **2014–**	15th	1st
PSMS	Medan	3	3	1	2017	2018	14	2008–2009; 2011–2012; 2018	Championship; 7th in Group 1	15th Lost promotion/relegation play-off in 2008 (relegated)
PSPS	Pekanbaru	4	1	4	2008–09	2013	13	2009–2013	Championship; 6th in Group 1	8th
**PSS**	Sleman Regency	7	2	6	2025–26	2024–25	10	2019–2025; **2026–**	Championship; 2nd (promoted)	8th
RANS Nusantara	Nusantara	2	1	2	2021	2023–24	15	2022–2024	Liga Nusantara; 1st (promoted)	16th (relegated)
Semen Padang	Padang	7	4	3	2023–24	2025–26	10	2010–2011; 2014–2017; 2019; 2024–2026	17th (relegated)	4th Reached second stage in 2014 (ranked 3rd in Group A)
Sriwijaya	Palembang	9	1	9	1999	2018	8	2008–2018	Championship; 10th in Group 1 (relegated)	1st

== Location of all clubs who have competed in the Super League ==
Where a club has played at multiple locations, the current location is shown (if they are a current Super League member), or the location played at during the most recent Super League season they competed in (if they are currently in the lower divisions).

Location of Super League clubs since 2008

Sumatra Lesser Sunda Islands Kalimantan	Sulawesi Western New Guinea

Location of Super League clubs from Java region since 2008

Banten Special Capital Region of Jakarta West Java	Central Java Special Region of Yogyakarta East Java

== Clubs that have competed in the top flight Premier Division, but not the Super League ==
Clubs who have competed in the top flight Premier Division, but not the Super League
Clubs from Java region who have competed in the top flight Premier Division, but not the Super League

Club	Regency or city	Highest Premier Division finish	Total seasons	Last relegation	Current status	Level in pyramid
Arseto	Surakarta	7th West Region in 1994–95 and Central Region in 1996–97	4	1997–98; Disbanded	Defunct	–
ASGS	Surabaya	3rd East Region in 1994–95; Reached second stage (ranked 3rd in Group B)	3	1996–97; Disbanded	Defunct	–
Bandung Raya	Bandung	1st West Region in 1995–96; Became champions after winning final	3	1996–97; Disbanded	Defunct	–
BPD Jateng	Semarang	14th West Region in 1994–95	2	1995–96	Defunct	–
Indocement Cirebon (Note: Mataram Putra (1994–1995), Mataram Indocement (1995–1998))	Cirebon	6th West Region in 1995–96; Reached second stage (ranked 4th in Group C)	4	1999–2000	Defunct	–
Medan Jaya	Medan	4th West Region in 1994–95; Reached second stage (ranked 4th in Group B)	6	1999–2000	No status	–
Perseden	Denpasar	15th Ranked 4th in relegation play-offs (relegated)	1	2003	Liga Nusantara	3
Persedikab	Kediri Regency	11th East Region in 1996–97 (relegated)	2	2002	Liga 4	4
Persegi	Gianyar Regency	10th East Region in 2005	3	2007–08	Defunct	–
Persekabpas	Pasuruan Regency	4th West Region in 2006; Reached semi-finals	3	2007–08	Liga Nusantara	3
Perseman	Manokwari Regency	17th East Region in 2007–08	1	2007–08	No status	–
Persibom	Bolaang Mongondow Regency	10th East Region in 2007–08	3	2007–08	Liga 4	4
Persikab	Bandung Regency	5th West Region in 1995–96; Reached second stage (ranked 2nd in Group A)	7	2002	Liga 4	4
Persikabo	Bogor Regency	5th Central Region (Group C) in 1998–99 (relegated after losing play-off)	4	2007–08	Liga 4	4
Persikota	Tangerang	1st Central Region (Group C) in 1998–99; Reached semi-finals in 1999–2000	10	2007–08	Liga Nusantara	3
Persiku	Kudus Regency	12th West Region in 1994–95	1	1995–96; Withdrew	Championship	2
Persiter	Ternate	6th East Region in 2007–08	2	2007–08	No status	–
Persma	Manado	2nd East Region in 1997–98 (league didn't finish); Reached second stage in 1996–97 (ranked 3rd in Group B)	7	2007–08	Liga 4	4
Persmin	Minahasa Regency	1st East Region in 2006; Reached semi-finals	3	2007–08	Liga 4	4
PS Bengkulu	Bengkulu	16th West Region in 1994–95 (relegated)	1	1994–95	No status	–
PSB	Bogor	7th Central Region in 1997–98 (league didn't finish)	2	1998–99; Withdrew	Liga 4	4
PSBL	Bandar Lampung	4th West Region (Group B) in 1998–99	6	2002	No status	–
PSDS	Deli Serdang Regency	3rd West Region (Group A) in 1998–99	12	2007–08	Liga 4	4
PSIR	Rembang Regency	16th East Region in 1994–95 (relegated)	1	1994–95	Liga 4	4
PSP	Padang	5th Central Region in 1996–97 and West Region (Group A) in 1998–99	5	2001	Liga 4	4
PSSB	Bireuën Regency	18th West Region in 2007–08	1	2007–08	No status	–
Warna Agung	Jakarta	17th West Region in 1994–95 (relegated)	1	1994–95	Defunct	–

== Clubs that have competed in the dualism era Premier League, but not the Super League ==
Clubs who have competed in the dualism era Premier League, but not the Super League
Clubs from Java region who have competed in the dualism era Premier League, but not the Super League

Club	Regency or city	Highest Premier League finish	Total seasons	Last relegation	Current status	Level in pyramid
Arema Indonesia (Note: Arema Indonesia, reactivated in 2017 and enrolled into Liga 3, changed name to ArekMalang Indonesia in 2025.)	Malang	3rd	2	2013; Disqualified	No status	–
Jakarta 1928	Jakarta	9th	2	2013; Disqualified	Defunct	–
Perseman	Manokwari Regency	2nd (league didn't finish)	1	2013	No status	–
Persibo	Bojonegoro Regency	4th	2	2013; Disqualified	Liga Nusantara	3
Pro Duta	Deli Serdang Regency	3rd (league didn't finish)	1	2013	Defunct	–
PSIR	Rembang Regency	7th (league didn't finish)	1	2013	Liga 4	4
PSLS	Lhokseumawe	11th (league didn't finish)	1	2013	No status	–
