= 1994–95 Liga Indonesia First Division =

Liga Indonesia First Division
- Season: 1994–95
- Dates: November 1994 – 13 July 1995
- Champions: Persikab
- Promoted: Persikab; Persma
- Relegated: PSA; PSGC

The 1994–95 Liga Indonesia First Division (known as Divisi Satu Liga Dunhill for sponsorship reasons) was the inaugural season of the Liga Indonesia First Division, the second-tier division of Indonesian football operating below the Liga Indonesia Premier Division. The season began in November 1994 and ended on 13 July 1995. The league was made up of 16 clubs. Persikab won the title after defeating Persma 2–1 in the final.

== Teams ==
The inaugural edition of the Liga Indonesia First Division was motivated by the PSSI's decision to merge the Perserikatan and Galatama into a new competition system, Liga Indonesia. All clubs from both top-tier leagues were merged into the Liga Indonesia Premier Division, forming the new national first tier. Since Galatama did not have any level lower than their top division in their final season, the clubs for the lower tiers of Liga Indonesia were drawn from clubs at the same level in the Perserikatan. The teams are almost identical to the 1993 Perserikatan First Division apart from champions Persipura and runners-up Persiku who are being promoted to the new Premier Division while Perserikatan Second Division champions Persis and runners-up Persikab move up to the new First Division.

=== Stadiums and locations ===
Locations of the teams in the 1994–95 Liga Indonesia First Division.
Blue: West; Green: Central I; Yellow: Central II; Red: East

Team	Location	Stadium	Capacity
Perseden	Denpasar	Kompyang Sujana	7,000
Persedikab	Kediri	Canda Bhirawa	3,000
Persibri	Batanghari	KONI Batanghari	10,000
Persidafon	Jayapura	Barnabas Youwe	15,000
Persijap	Jepara	Kamal Djunaedi	15,000
Persikab	Cimahi	Sangkuriang	5,000
Persis	Surakarta	Sriwedari	12,000
Persiss	Sorong	Wombik	7,000
Persitara	Jakarta (North Jakarta)	Tugu	4,000
Persma	Manado	Klabat	10,000
PSA	Ambon	Mandala Remaja	15,000
PSBL	Bandar Lampung	Pahoman	15,000
PSGC	Ciamis	Galuh	25,000
PSJS	Jakarta (South Jakarta)	Lebak Bulus	12,500
PSP	Padang	Gelora Haji Agus Salim	11,000
PSSB	Bireuën	Cot Gapu	15,000

=== Kits and sponsorship ===
All of the teams kits are provided by Adidas and sponsored by Dunhill as part of the league's sponsorship deal.

== First stage ==
A total of 16 clubs participated in this season divided into four groups based on their regions: West, Central I, Central II, and East.

=== West ===
Pos	Team	Pld	W	D	L	GF	GA	GD	Pts	Qualification
1	PSBL	6	3	2	1	13	8	+5	11	Advance to second stage
2	PSSB	6	3	1	2	5	4	+1	10	Advance to second stage
3	PSP	6	2	2	2	8	7	+1	8	
4	Persibri	6	1	1	4	8	15	−7	4	Qualification to relegation play-offs

Source: Arsip Sepakbola Indonesia

=== Central I ===
Pos	Team	Pld	W	D	L	GF	GA	GD	Pts	Qualification
1	Persikab	6	4	1	1	8	4	+4	13	Advance to second stage
2	PSJS	6	3	1	2	7	4	+3	10	Advance to second stage
3	Persitara	6	1	2	3	3	7	−4	5	
4	PSGC	6	0	4	2	2	5	−3	4	Qualification to relegation play-offs

Source: Arsip Sepakbola Indonesia

=== Central II ===
Pos	Team	Pld	W	D	L	GF	GA	GD	Pts	Qualification
1	Persedikab	6	2	3	1	7	6	+1	9	Advance to second stage
2	Persis	6	2	3	1	7	6	+1	9	Advance to second stage
3	Perseden	6	2	2	2	12	10	+2	8	
4	Persijap	6	0	4	2	6	10	−4	4	Qualification to relegation play-offs

Source: Arsip Sepakbola Indonesia

=== East ===
All matches in this group were held at Klabat Stadium in Manado for operational reasons.

Pos	Team	Pld	W	D	L	GF	GA	GD	Pts	Qualification
1	Persma	6	3	2	1	12	6	+6	11	Advance to second stage
2	Persiss	6	3	1	2	7	5	+2	10	Advance to second stage
3	Persidafon	6	1	3	2	7	8	−1	6	
4	PSA	6	2	0	4	4	11	−7	6	Qualification to relegation play-offs

Source: Arsip Sepakbola Indonesia

=== Relegation play-offs ===
No recorded information on the relegation play-offs match results but based on available information, PSA and PSGC were the two teams relegated.

Team	Relegation
Persibri	
Persijap
PSA (R)	Relegation to Second Division
PSGC (R)	Relegation to Second Division

Source: Arsip Sepakbola Indonesia
(R) Relegated

== Second stage ==
The second stage was played from 2 to 9 July 1995. The matches were held at Klabat Stadium in Manado.

=== Group A ===
Pos	Team	Pld	W	D	L	GF	GA	GD	Pts	Qualification
1	PSBL	3	2	0	1	3	2	+1	6	Advance to knockout stage
2	Persis	3	1	2	0	3	2	+1	5	Advance to knockout stage
3	PSJS	3	1	1	1	7	3	+4	4	
4	Persiss	3	0	1	2	3	9	−6	1	

Source: RSSSF

=== Group B ===
Pos	Team	Pld	W	D	L	GF	GA	GD	Pts	Qualification
1	Persma	3	2	1	0	5	2	+3	7	Advance to knockout stage
2	Persikab	3	1	2	0	5	2	+3	5	Advance to knockout stage
3	Persedikab	3	1	1	1	7	4	+3	4	
4	PSSB	3	0	0	3	1	10	−9	0	

Source: RSSSF

== Knockout stage ==
Semifinals
11 July – Manado
Persma	6
Persis	0
11 July – Manado
PSBL	0
Persikab	2

Final
13 July – Manado
Persma	1
Persikab	2
Match for third place
13 July – Manado
PSBL	2
Persis	0

=== Semifinals ===
The winners are promoted to the Premier Division.

11 July 1995

PSBL	0–2	Persikab
	Report	Risdiyanto 24'; Agustian Indra 36'

Klabat Stadium, Manado

11 July 1995

Persma	6–0	Persis
Yan Kaunang 7', 33'; Johan Hendemans 35'; Rudi Manumpil 75', 80'; Abdon Pongoh 83'	Report

Klabat Stadium, Manado

=== Match for third place ===
13 July 1995

PSBL	2–0	Persis
	Report

Klabat Stadium, Manado

=== Final ===
13 July 1995

Persma	1–2	Persikab
Yan Kaunang 21'	Report	Anton Hermawan 11'; Suladi 83'

Klabat Stadium, Manado

== See also ==
- 1994–95 Liga Indonesia Premier Division
- 1994–95 Liga Indonesia Second Division
