= 1995–96 Liga Indonesia Second Division =

Liga Indonesia Second Division
- Season: 1995–96
- Dates: Regional phase: 1995 – March 1996; National phase: April – June 1996
- Champions: Persikota
- Promoted: Persikota; Persewangi; PSS

The 1995–96 Liga Indonesia Second Division was the second season of the Liga Indonesia Second Division, the third-tier division of Indonesian football operating below the Premier Division and First Division, being the only amateur competition in the structure. Persikota won the title after defeating Persewangi 1–0 in the final.

== Format ==
The competition is held in two main phases, the regional phase and the national phase. The regional phase is played in stages throughout various regions in Indonesia, resulting in the best 16 teams qualifying for the national phase. The national phase is itself divided into three stages.

== Team changes ==
▲ Promoted to First Division	▼ Relegated from First Division
Persikabo; Persiter; PSPS; PSB	PSA; PSGC

== Regional phase ==
The following teams were the representatives from their respective regions to be competing in the national phase.

Region	Team
Sumatra	(South Sumatra) Persibel
Sumatra	(Lampung) Persilat
Sumatra	(North Sumatra) Perstu
Sumatra	(Riau) PS Karimun
Sumatra	(West Sumatra) PSKB
Java	(East Java) Persewangi
Java	(Jakarta) Persija Barat
Java	(West Java) Persikota
Java	(Special Region of Yogyakarta) PSS
Bali and Nusa Tenggara Islands	(Bali) Persekaba
Bali and Nusa Tenggara Islands	(East Nusa Tenggara) PSK Kupang
Kalimantan	(West Kalimantan) Gabsis
Kalimantan	(South Kalimantan) Persemar
Sulawesi	(North Sulawesi) Persigo
Sulawesi	(Central Sulawesi) Persipal
Irian Jaya and Maluku Islands	(Maluku (province)) Persis Soasio

== National phase ==
=== First stage ===
The best 16 teams from the regional phase were divided into four groups of four. The top two teams from each group will advance to the second stage.

==== Group A ====
Team	Qualification
(West Java) Persikota	Advance to second stage
(North Sumatra) Perstu	Advance to second stage
(West Kalimantan) Gabsis	
(South Sumatra) Persibel

Source: Arsip Sepakbola Indonesia

==== Group B ====
Team	Qualification
(Special Region of Yogyakarta) PSS	Advance to second stage
(Jakarta) Persija Barat	Advance to second stage
(West Sumatra) PSKB	
(Lampung) Persilat

Source: Arsip Sepakbola Indonesia

==== Group C ====
Team	Qualification
(East Java) Persewangi	Advance to second stage
(Riau) PS Karimun	Advance to second stage
(East Nusa Tenggara) PSK Kupang	
(Bali) Persekaba

Source: Arsip Sepakbola Indonesia

==== Group D ====
Team	Qualification
(Central Sulawesi) Persipal	Advance to second stage
(Maluku (province)) Persis Soasio	Advance to second stage
(North Sulawesi) Persigo	
(South Kalimantan) Persemar

Source: Arsip Sepakbola Indonesia

=== Second stage ===
Eight teams from the first stage were divided into two groups of four. The top two teams from each group will advance to the knockout stage.

==== Group I ====
Team	Qualification
(West Java) Persikota	Advance to knockout stage
(East Java) Persewangi	Advance to knockout stage
(Jakarta) Persija Barat	
(Maluku (province)) Persis Soasio

Source: Arsip Sepakbola Indonesia

==== Group II ====
Team	Qualification
(Special Region of Yogyakarta) PSS	Advance to knockout stage
(Central Sulawesi) Persipal	Advance to knockout stage
(North Sumatra) Perstu	
(Riau) PS Karimun

Source: Arsip Sepakbola Indonesia

=== Knockout stage ===
Semifinals
Tangerang
Persikota	2
Persipal	0
Tangerang
PSS	1 (2)
Persewangi (p)	1 (3)

Final
Tangerang
Persikota	1
Persewangi	0
Match for third place
Tangerang
Persipal	1
PSS	0

==== Semifinals ====
The winners are promoted to the First Division while the losers qualify for the promotion play-offs.

1996

Persikota (West Java)	2–0	(Central Sulawesi) Persipal
	Report

Benteng Stadium, Tangerang

1996

PSS (Special Region of Yogyakarta)	1–1	(East Java) Persewangi
	Report
Penalties
	2–3

Benteng Stadium, Tangerang

==== Match for third place ====
1996

Persipal (Central Sulawesi)	1–0	(Special Region of Yogyakarta) PSS
	Report

Benteng Stadium, Tangerang

==== Final ====
1996

Persikota (West Java)	1–0	(East Java) Persewangi
Noah Maryen 28'	Report

Benteng Stadium, Tangerang
Referee: Benyamin L.

== Promotion play-offs ==
No recorded information on the match results in the promotion play-offs but based on available information, Persiss successfully retained their First Division status while PSS were promoted to the second-tier competition. PS Aceh Putra were relegated to the Second Division while Persipal failed to win promotion and remain in the third-tier competition.

Team	Qualification
Persiss	First Division
PSS (P)	First Division
PS Aceh Putra (R)	Second Division
Persipal	Second Division

Source: Arsip Sepakbola Indonesia
(P) Promoted; (R) Relegated

== See also ==
- 1995–96 Liga Indonesia Premier Division
- 1995–96 Liga Indonesia First Division
