= 2001 Liga Indonesia Premier Division =

Football season in Indonesia

Liga Indonesia Premier Division
- Season: 2001
- Dates: 14 January – 7 October 2001
- Champions: Persija; 1st Premier Division title 10th Indonesian title
- Relegated: Persiraja; PSP; Persikabo; Persijap; Persma; Putra Samarinda
- Asian Club Championship: Persija
- Asian Cup Winners' Cup: PSM
- Matches: 366
- Goals: 870 (2.38 per match)
- Top goalscorer: Sadissou Bako (22 goals)
- Biggest home win: Semen Padang 7–0 Persijatim (11 April)
- Biggest away win: Persiraja 1–5 Persija (13 June)
- Highest scoring: Persita 5–3 Persijatim (4 July); Persipura 6–2 Gelora Delta Putra (1 August); PSMS 5–3 PSBL (2 August)

The 2001 Liga Indonesia Premier Division (also known as the Liga Bank Mandiri for sponsorship reasons) was the seventh season of the Liga Indonesia Premier Division, the top Indonesian professional league for association football clubs, since its formation in 1994. It began on 14 January and ended on 7 October. It was contested by 28 teams. Persija won the title after beating defending champions, PSM 3–2 in the final. RCTI provided broadcast coverage for the season.

== Teams ==
=== Team changes ===
==== Relegated from Premier Division ====
- Indocement Cirebon
- Medan Jaya
- PSIM
- PSIS

==== Promoted to Premier Division ====
- Persita
- PSS
- Persikabo
- Persijap

=== Name changes ===
- Gelora Dewata changed their name to Gelora Delta Putra following their relocation to Sidoarjo.

=== Stadiums and locations ===
Locations of the teams in the 2001 Liga Indonesia Premier Division.
Blue: West Region; Red: East Region

West Region
Team	Location	Stadium
Persib	Bandung	Siliwangi
Persija	Jakarta (Central Jakarta)	Lebak Bulus
Persijatim	Jakarta (East Jakarta)	Rawamangun
Persikab	Cimahi	Sangkuriang
Persikabo	Bogor	Pajajaran
Persikota	Tangerang	Benteng
Persiraja	Banda Aceh	Haji Dimurthala
PSBL	Bandar Lampung	Pahoman
Persita	Tangerang	Benteng
PSDS	Deli Serdang	Baharuddin Siregar
PSMS	Medan	Teladan
PSP	Padang	Haji Agus Salim
PSPS	Pekanbaru	Kaharudin Nasution
Semen Padang	Padang	Haji Agus Salim

East Region
Team	Location	Stadium
Arema	Malang	Gajayana
Barito Putera	Banjarmasin	May 17th
Gelora Delta Putra	Sidoarjo	Gelora Delta
Pelita Solo	Surakarta	Manahan
Persebaya	Surabaya	Gelora 10 November
Persema	Malang	Gajayana
Persijap	Jepara	Kamal Djunaedi
Persipura	Jayapura	Mandala
Persma	Manado	Klabat
Petrokimia Putra	Gresik	Petrokimia
PSM	Makassar	Andi Mattalata
PSS	Sleman	Tridadi
Pupuk Kaltim	Bontang	Mulawarman
Putra Samarinda	Samarinda	Segiri Samarinda

== First stage ==
=== West Region ===
Pos	Team	Pld	W	D	L	GF	GA	GD	Pts	Qualification or relegation
1	PSMS	26	16	4	6	38	24	+14	52	Advance to second stage
2	Persija (C)	26	15	6	5	47	18	+29	51	Advance to second stage
3	Persib	26	15	2	9	23	18	+5	47	Advance to second stage
4	Persita	26	13	3	10	39	28	+11	42	Advance to second stage
5	Persikota	26	11	8	7	37	22	+15	41	
6	PSPS	26	10	10	6	27	24	+3	40	
7	Semen Padang	26	9	9	8	35	26	+9	36	
8	Persijatim	26	9	7	10	30	36	−6	34	
9	PSBL	26	8	8	10	28	30	−2	32	
10	PSDS	26	7	8	11	24	33	−9	29	
11	Persikab	26	7	8	11	26	36	−10	29	
12	Persiraja (R)	26	6	7	13	27	49	−22	25	Relegation to First Division
13	PSP (R)	26	6	4	16	22	36	−14	22	Relegation to First Division
14	Persikabo (R)	26	5	6	15	22	45	−23	21	Relegation to First Division

Source: RSSSF
(R) Relegated

=== East Region ===
Pos	Team	Pld	W	D	L	GF	GA	GD	Pts	Qualification or relegation
1	PSM	25	16	6	3	36	12	+24	54	Advance to second stage
2	Persebaya	25	15	6	4	44	11	+33	51	Advance to second stage
3	Arema	25	14	4	7	29	23	+6	46	Advance to second stage
4	Barito Putera	25	12	7	6	32	22	+10	43	Advance to second stage
5	Pupuk Kaltim	25	12	2	11	34	29	+5	38	
6	Petrokimia Putra	25	8	10	7	34	30	+4	34	
7	Persema	25	8	9	8	23	24	−1	33	
8	Persipura	25	10	2	13	30	37	−7	32	
9	Gelora Delta Putra	25	6	9	10	26	35	−9	27	
10	PSS	25	8	3	14	22	40	−18	27	
11	Pelita Solo	25	7	4	14	33	35	−2	25	
12	Persijap (R)	25	6	5	14	27	46	−19	23	Relegation to First Division
13	Persma (R)	25	6	5	14	21	39	−18	23	Relegation to First Division
14	~~Putra Samarinda~~ (Note: Putra Samarinda withdrew in 22nd matchday.) (R)	13	4	2	7	13	21	−8	14	Relegation to First Division

Source: RSSSF
(R) Relegated

== Second stage ==
=== Group A ===
Pos	Team	Pld	W	D	L	GF	GA	GD	Pts	Qualification
1	PSMS	3	3	0	0	5	2	+3	9	Advance to knockout stage
2	Persebaya	3	2	0	1	3	2	+1	6	Advance to knockout stage
3	Persib	3	1	0	2	2	3	−1	3	
4	Barito Putera	3	0	0	3	2	5	−3	0	

Source: RSSSF

=== Group B ===
Pos	Team	Pld	W	D	L	GF	GA	GD	Pts	Qualification
1	Persija	3	2	1	0	5	3	+2	7	Advance to knockout stage
2	PSM	3	2	0	1	4	1	+3	6	Advance to knockout stage
3	Persita	3	1	1	1	6	4	+2	4	
4	Arema	3	0	0	3	2	9	−7	0	

Source: RSSSF

== Knockout stage ==
Semifinals
4 October – Jakarta
PSMS	2 (2)
PSM (pen.)	2 (3)
4 October – Jakarta
Persija	2
Persebaya	1

Final
7 October – Jakarta
PSM	2
Persija	3

=== Semifinals ===
4 October 2001
15:30 WIB

Persija	2–1	Persebaya
Leandro 44'; Claudio		Uston 64' (pen.)

Gelora Bung Karno Stadium, Jakarta

4 October 2001
19:00 WIB

PSMS	2–2 (a.e.t.)	PSM
Gutierrez 3'; Supriyono 62'		Bento 40'; Yuniarto 57'
Penalties
Marco Mourmada (penalty missed); Misrun (penalty scored); Edu Juanda (penalty missed); Slamet (penalty missed); Gutierrez (penalty scored)	2–3	(penalty missed) Bento; (penalty scored) Bima Sakti; (penalty missed) Ilham Romadhona; (penalty scored) Ortizan; (penalty scored) de Mello

Gelora Bung Karno Stadium, Jakarta

=== Final ===
7 October 2001
17:30 WIB

PSM	2–3	Persija
Bento 65' (pen.); Kurniawan 80'		Imran 3'; Bambang 42', 47'

Gelora Bung Karno Stadium, Jakarta
Attendance: 60,000
Referee: Aris Munandar

== Awards ==
=== Top scorer ===
The following is a list of the top scorers from the 2001 season.

Rank	Player	Club	Goals
1	(Cameroon) Sadissou Bako	Barito Putera	22
2	(Indonesia) Ilham Jaya Kesuma	Persita	20
3	(Indonesia) Budi Sudarsono	Persija	16
3	(Cameroon) Marco Mourmada	PSMS	16
4	(Indonesia) Bambang Pamungkas	Persija	15
5	(Indonesia) Kurniawan Dwi Yulianto	PSM	14
5	(Indonesia) Ahmad Junaidi	Arema	14

=== Best player ===
(Indonesia) Bambang Pamungkas (Persija)
