= 2007 Liga Indonesia First Division =

Liga Indonesia First Division
- Season: 2007
- Champions: Persibo Bojonegoro
- Promoted: PSP Padang; PSAP Sigli; Persih Tembilahan; PSPS Pekanbaru; Persikad Depok; Persiku Kudus; Persikab Bandung; Persibat Batang; Persibo Bojonegoro; Persiba Bantul; Gresik United; PSIR Rembang; Mitra Kukar; Persigo Gorontalo; Persisam Putra Samarinda

The 2007 Liga Indonesia First Division is the 13th edition of Liga Indonesia First Division, second-tier competition in Indonesian football.

== First stage ==
=== Region I ===
| Pos | Team | Pld | W | D | L | GF | GA | GD | Pts |
|---|---|---|---|---|---|---|---|---|---|
| 1 | PSP Padang | 16 | 11 | 1 | 4 | 21 | 16 | +5 | 34 |
| 2 | PSAP Sigli | 16 | 9 | 3 | 4 | 30 | 16 | +14 | 30 |
| 3 | Persih Tembilahan | 16 | 9 | 2 | 5 | 23 | 17 | +6 | 29 |
| 4 | PSPS Pekanbaru | 16 | 7 | 2 | 7 | 22 | 20 | +2 | 23 |
| 5 | PSLS Lhokseumawe | 16 | 6 | 3 | 7 | 16 | 18 | −2 | 21 |
| 6 | PSBL Bandar Lampung | 16 | 6 | 3 | 7 | 15 | 20 | −5 | 21 |
| 7 | PSBL Langsa | 16 | 5 | 3 | 8 | 17 | 27 | −10 | 18 |
| 8 | PSKPS Padang Sidempuan | 16 | 4 | 3 | 9 | 15 | 20 | −5 | 15 |
| 9 | PS Palembang | 16 | 4 | 2 | 10 | 22 | 27 | −5 | 14 |

=== Region II ===
| Pos | Team | Pld | W | D | L | GF | GA | GD | Pts |
|---|---|---|---|---|---|---|---|---|---|
| 1 | Persikad Depok | 18 | 10 | 3 | 5 | 29 | 15 | +14 | 33 |
| 2 | Persiku Kudus | 18 | 9 | 5 | 4 | 37 | 20 | +17 | 32 |
| 3 | Persikab Bandung | 18 | 9 | 3 | 6 | 30 | 19 | +11 | 30 |
| 4 | Persibat Batang | 18 | 9 | 2 | 7 | 25 | 18 | +7 | 29 |
| 5 | Perserang Serang | 18 | 7 | 7 | 4 | 29 | 18 | +11 | 28 |
| 6 | Pro Duta | 18 | 8 | 4 | 6 | 17 | 14 | +3 | 28 |
| 7 | Persipur Purwodadi | 18 | 7 | 2 | 9 | 27 | 24 | +3 | 23 |
| 8 | Persipasi Bekasi | 18 | 4 | 7 | 7 | 18 | 22 | −4 | 19 |
| 9 | Persebi Boyolali | 18 | 4 | 5 | 9 | 13 | 34 | −21 | 17 |
| 10 | PSB Bogor | 18 | 2 | 4 | 12 | 17 | 56 | −39 | 10 |

=== Region III ===
| Pos | Team | Pld | W | D | L | GF | GA | GD | Pts |
|---|---|---|---|---|---|---|---|---|---|
| 1 | Persibo Bojonegoro | 18 | 11 | 4 | 3 | 25 | 11 | +14 | 37 |
| 2 | Persiba Bantul | 18 | 11 | 3 | 4 | 34 | 20 | +14 | 36 |
| 3 | Gresik United | 18 | 11 | 2 | 5 | 31 | 17 | +14 | 35 |
| 4 | PSIR Rembang | 18 | 11 | 0 | 7 | 34 | 20 | +14 | 33 |
| 5 | Persid Jember | 18 | 10 | 1 | 7 | 22 | 20 | +2 | 31 |
| 6 | PS Mojokerto Putra | 18 | 7 | 3 | 8 | 23 | 19 | +4 | 24 |
| 7 | Persipon Pontianak | 18 | 7 | 2 | 9 | 24 | 30 | −6 | 23 |
| 8 | Persepar Palangkaraya | 18 | 4 | 5 | 9 | 17 | 30 | −13 | 17 |
| 9 | Persipro Probolinggo | 18 | 3 | 3 | 12 | 8 | 32 | −24 | 12 |
| 10 | Persedikab Kediri | 18 | 1 | 5 | 12 | 18 | 37 | −19 | 8 |

=== Region IV ===
| Pos | Team | Pld | W | D | L | GF | GA | GD | Pts |
|---|---|---|---|---|---|---|---|---|---|
| 1 | Mitra Kukar | 16 | 11 | 0 | 5 | 35 | 21 | +14 | 33 |
| 2 | Persigo Gorontalo | 16 | 9 | 2 | 5 | 29 | 19 | +10 | 29 |
| 3 | Persisam Putra Samarinda | 16 | 9 | 0 | 7 | 33 | 20 | +13 | 27 |
| 4 | Persidago Gorontalo | 16 | 7 | 4 | 5 | 21 | 26 | −5 | 25 |
| 5 | Persekaba Yahukimo FC | 16 | 7 | 3 | 6 | 18 | 19 | −1 | 24 |
| 6 | Persipal Palu | 16 | 6 | 2 | 8 | 21 | 22 | −1 | 23 (Note: 3 bonus points?) |
| 7 | Persidafon Dafonsoro | 16 | 6 | 3 | 7 | 15 | 15 | 0 | 21 |
| 8 | Persemalra Maluku Tenggara | 16 | 4 | 3 | 9 | 14 | 23 | −9 | 15 |
| 9 | Persipare Pare-Pare | 16 | 3 | 3 | 10 | 19 | 40 | −21 | 12 |

== Championship play-off ==
Semi-finals
7 September – Surakarta
PSP Padang | 1
Persibo Bojonegoro | 2
7 September – Surakarta
Persikad Depok (p) | 1 (4)
Mitra Kukar | 1 (2)

Final
10 September – Surakarta
Persibo Bojonegoro | 1
Persikad Depok | 0
