= 1995–96 Liga Indonesia Premier Division =

Indonesian football season

Liga Indonesia Premier Division
- Season: 1995–96
- Dates: 27 November 1995 – 6 October 1996
- Champions: Bandung Raya; 1st Premier Division title 1st Indonesian title
- Relegated: Persegres; BPD Jateng
- Asian Club Championship: PSM
- Asian Cup Winners' Cup: Bandung Raya
- Matches: 471
- Goals: 1,128 (2.39 per match)
- Top goalscorer: Dejan Gluščević (30 goals)
- Biggest home win: Persiraja 7–1 BPD Jateng; Persikab 6–0 Persijatim; Petrokimia Putra 6–0 Persma; Pupuk Kaltim 6–0 Persma; PSM 6–0 ASGS
- Biggest away win: BPD Jateng 0–4 Pelita Jaya; Persija 0–4 Persita; Persijatim 0–4 Bandung Raya; PSMS 0–4 Semen Padang
- Highest scoring: Persebaya 7–3 Persema

The 1995–96 Liga Indonesia Premier Division (known as the Liga Dunhill for sponsorship reasons) was the second season of the Liga Indonesia Premier Division, the top division of Indonesian football. The season began on 26 November 1995 and ended on 6 October 1996. Bandung Raya won the title after beating PSM 2–0 in the final.

== Teams ==
=== Team changes ===
The number of teams dropped from 34 to 31 this season.

==== Relegated to First Division ====
- PS Bengkulu
- Warna Agung
- PSIR
- PSIM

==== Promoted to Premier Division ====
- Persikab
- Persma

==== Withdrew from Premier Division ====
- Persiku

=== Name changes ===
- Mataram Putra changed its name to Mataram Indocement

=== Stadiums and locations ===
Locations of the teams in the 1995–96 Liga Indonesia Premier Division.
Blue: West Region; Red: East Region

West Region
| Team | Location | Stadium |
|---|---|---|
| Arseto | Surakarta | Sriwedari |
| Bandung Raya | Bandung | Siliwangi |
| BPD Jateng | Semarang | Jatidiri |
| Mataram Indocement | Yogyakarta | Mandala Krida |
| Medan Jaya | Medan | Teladan |
| Pelita Jaya | Jakarta (South Jakarta) | Lebak Bulus |
| Persib | Bandung | Siliwangi |
| Persija | Jakarta (Central Jakarta) | Menteng |
| Persijatim | Jakarta (East Jakarta) | Rawamangun |
| Persikab | Cimahi | Sangkuriang |
| Persiraja | Banda Aceh | Haji Dimurthala |
| Persita | Tangerang | Benteng |
| PSDS | Deli Serdang | Baharuddin Siregar |
| PSMS | Medan | Teladan |
| Semen Padang | Padang | Haji Agus Salim |

East Region
| Team | Location | Stadium |
|---|---|---|
| Arema | Malang | Gajayana |
| ASGS | Surabaya | Gelora 10 November |
| Barito Putera | Banjarmasin | May 17th |
| Gelora Dewata | Denpasar | Ngurah Rai |
| Mitra Surabaya | Surabaya | Gelora 10 November |
| Persebaya | Surabaya | Gelora 10 November |
| Persegres | Gresik | Petrokimia |
| Persema | Malang | Gajayana |
| Persiba | Balikpapan | Persiba |
| Persipura | Jayapura | Mandala |
| Persma | Manado | Klabat |
| Petrokimia Putra | Gresik | Petrokimia |
| Pupuk Kaltim | Bontang | Mulawarman |
| Putra Samarinda | Samarinda | Segiri Samarinda |
| PSIS | Semarang | Jatidiri |
| PSM | Ujung Pandang | Andi Mattalata |

=== Kits and sponsorship ===
All of the teams kits are provided by Adidas and sponsored by Dunhill as part of the league's sponsorship deal.

== Foreign payers ==
| Klub | Visa 1 | Visa 2 | Visa 3 | Former players |
|---|---|---|---|---|
| Arema | (Australia) Michael McBride | (Australia) Alex Stoikos | (Cameroon) Cornelis Mamesah | (Australia) Peter Herder |
| Arseto | | | | |
| Assyabaab | | | | |
| Bandung Raya | (Cameroon) Olinga Atangana | (Federal Republic of Yugoslavia) Dejan Gluščević | | |
| Barito Putera | | | | |
| BPD Jateng | | | | |
| Gelora Dewata | (Angola) Vata Matanu Garcia | (Brazil) Victor Hugo | | (Brazil) Claudio Toyo |
| Mataram Indocement | (Brazil) Jaldecir "Deca" dos Santos | (Brazil) Jaison Rocha | (Brazil) Gabriel Moreira Filho | |
| Medan Jaya | (Brazil) Abilio Zeca | | | |
| Mitra Surabaya | (Brazil) Gomes de Oliveira | (Brazil) Carlos De Mello | (Brazil) Julio Caesar da Costa | |
| Pelita Jaya | (Argentina) Pedro Pasculli | (Cameroon) Maboang Kessack | (Italy) Giuseppe Accardi | (Federal Republic of Yugoslavia) Miodrag Božović (Argentina) Mario Kempes |
| Persebaya | (Bulgaria) Plamen Illiev Kazakov | (Bulgaria) Nedyo Ivanov | (Brazil) Miramar Rocha | (Federal Republic of Yugoslavia) Branko Nadoveza (Federal Republic of Yugoslavia) Dejan Antonić |
| Persegres | (Angola) Jeremie Mboh Nyetam | (Cameroon) Louis-Paul M'Fédé | | |
| Persema | (Federal Republic of Yugoslavia) Dejan Antonić | | | |
| Persib | | | | |
| Persiba | | | | |
| Persija | (Brazil) Claudio | (Brazil) Mauro Sergio de Sonta | (Brazil) Marcelo Louis Marshall | |
| Persijatim | | | | |
| Persikab | (Brazil) Rocha Braga | | | |
| Persipura | | | | |
| Persiraja | | | | |
| Persita | (Brazil) Fabio Oliveira | (Brazil) Sinval Praga Pereira | | |
| Persma | (Chile) Rodrigo Araya | (Chile) Juan Rubio | | |
| Petrokimia Putra | (Trinidad and Tobago) Darryl Sinerine | (Trinidad and Tobago) Wesley Webb | (Trinidad and Tobago) Orent Prendergast | |
| PSDS | | | | |
| PSIS | (Brazil) Wellington Reiss | (Brazil) Arliston Oliveira | | |
| PSM | (Brazil) Jacksen F. Tiago | (Brazil) Marcio Novo | (Brazil) Luciano Leandro | |
| PSMS | (Brazil) Alessandro Godinho | (Brazil) Ronaldo Bteilho Da Avilla | | |
| Pupuk Kaltim | (Cameroon) Simon Atangana | (Cameroon) Fouda Ntsama | (Cameroon) Justin Imandi | |
| Putra Samarinda | (Cameroon) Roger Milla | (Cameroon) Marcel Mahouvé | (Cameroon) Bertin Ebwellé | |
| Semen Padang | | | | (Brazil) Admilson Marcelino Cunha |

== First stage ==
=== West Region ===
| Pos | Team | Pld | W | D | L | GF | GA | GD | Pts | Qualification or relegation |
|---|---|---|---|---|---|---|---|---|---|---|
| 1 | Bandung Raya (C) | 28 | 18 | 7 | 3 | 57 | 17 | +40 | 61 | Advance to second stage & qualification for the Asian Cup Winners' Cup (Note: Since the Premier Division was not finished before the AFC club registration deadline, PSSI awarded Bandung Raya qualification for the Asian Cup Winners' Cup as West Region champions.) |
| 2 | Pelita Jaya | 28 | 16 | 7 | 5 | 47 | 21 | +26 | 55 | Advance to second stage |
| 3 | Persib | 28 | 13 | 11 | 4 | 31 | 15 | +16 | 50 | Advance to second stage |
| 4 | Persita | 28 | 13 | 8 | 7 | 41 | 26 | +15 | 47 | Advance to second stage |
| 5 | Persikab | 28 | 13 | 6 | 9 | 41 | 27 | +14 | 45 | Advance to second stage |
| 6 | Mataram Indocement | 28 | 12 | 9 | 7 | 32 | 27 | +5 | 45 | Advance to second stage |
| 7 | Persiraja | 28 | 11 | 10 | 7 | 35 | 24 | +11 | 43 | |
| 8 | PSDS | 28 | 7 | 13 | 8 | 25 | 26 | −1 | 34 | |
| 9 | Semen Padang | 28 | 9 | 5 | 14 | 32 | 33 | −1 | 32 | |
| 10 | Medan Jaya | 28 | 8 | 8 | 12 | 22 | 30 | −8 | 32 | |
| 11 | PSMS | 28 | 6 | 10 | 12 | 15 | 30 | −15 | 28 | |
| 12 | Persijatim | 28 | 7 | 6 | 15 | 22 | 54 | −32 | 27 | |
| 13 | Arseto | 28 | 5 | 9 | 14 | 17 | 39 | −22 | 24 | |
| 14 | Persija | 28 | 5 | 8 | 15 | 17 | 39 | −22 | 23 | |
| 15 | BPD Jateng | 28 | 5 | 7 | 16 | 27 | 53 | −26 | 22 | Qualification for relegation play-offs |
| 16 | Persiku | 0 | 0 | 0 | 0 | 0 | 0 | 0 | 0 | Club withdrew (Note: Persiku withdrew before the season started.) |

Source: RSSSF
(C) Champions

=== East Region ===
| Pos | Team | Pld | W | D | L | GF | GA | GD | Pts | Qualification or relegation |
|---|---|---|---|---|---|---|---|---|---|---|
| 1 | PSM | 30 | 17 | 6 | 7 | 58 | 26 | +32 | 57 | Advance to second stage & qualification for the Asian Club Championship (Note: Since the Premier Division was not finished before the AFC club registration deadline, PSSI awarded PSM qualification for the Asian Club Championship as East Region champions.) |
| 2 | Mitra Surabaya | 30 | 15 | 9 | 6 | 49 | 31 | +18 | 54 | Advance to second stage |
| 3 | Pupuk Kaltim (Note: Pupuk Kaltim had 3 points deducted.) | 30 | 16 | 7 | 7 | 56 | 31 | +25 | 52 | Advance to second stage |
| 4 | Gelora Dewata | 30 | 14 | 8 | 8 | 47 | 27 | +20 | 50 | Advance to second stage |
| 5 | Persipura | 30 | 14 | 7 | 9 | 47 | 32 | +15 | 49 | Advance to second stage |
| 6 | Putra Samarinda | 30 | 14 | 6 | 10 | 44 | 39 | +5 | 48 | Advance to second stage |
| 7 | Persebaya | 30 | 12 | 11 | 7 | 45 | 35 | +10 | 47 | |
| 8 | Petrokimia Putra | 30 | 13 | 6 | 11 | 47 | 34 | +13 | 45 | |
| 9 | ASGS | 30 | 12 | 4 | 14 | 38 | 48 | −10 | 40 | |
| 10 | PSIS | 30 | 10 | 7 | 13 | 37 | 41 | −4 | 37 | |
| 11 | Persma (Note: Persma had 3 points deducted.) | 30 | 11 | 7 | 12 | 31 | 46 | −15 | 37 | |
| 12 | Arema | 30 | 8 | 11 | 11 | 19 | 25 | −6 | 35 | |
| 13 | Persema | 30 | 8 | 7 | 15 | 26 | 55 | −29 | 31 | |
| 14 | Persiba | 30 | 8 | 5 | 17 | 24 | 43 | −19 | 29 | |
| 15 | Barito Putera (Note: Barito Putera had 3 points deducted.) | 30 | 9 | 5 | 16 | 22 | 42 | −20 | 29 | |
| 16 | Persegres | 30 | 3 | 6 | 21 | 23 | 58 | −35 | 15 | Qualification for relegation play-offs |

Source: RSSSF

=== Relegation play-offs ===
The bottom teams from each region compete with the third and fourth placed teams from the First Division. No recorded information on the promotion play-offs match results but based on available information, PSB and PSBL won promotion to the Premier Division as Persegres were relegated to the First Division. BPD Jateng withdrew from the competition before the play-offs began.

| Team | Qualification |
|---|---|
| PSB (P) | Promotion to Premier Division |
| PSBL (P) | Promotion to Premier Division |
| Persegres (R) | Relegation to First Division |
| BPD Jateng (R) | Withdrew |

Source: Arsip Sepakbola Indonesia
(P) Promoted; (R) Relegated

== Second stage ==
=== Group A ===
| Pos | Team | Pld | W | D | L | GF | GA | GD | Pts | Qualification |
|---|---|---|---|---|---|---|---|---|---|---|
| 1 | Bandung Raya | 3 | 3 | 0 | 0 | 9 | 1 | +8 | 9 | Advance to knockout stage |
| 2 | Persikab | 3 | 1 | 1 | 1 | 4 | 4 | 0 | 4 | |
| 3 | Pupuk Kaltim | 3 | 1 | 0 | 2 | 1 | 4 | −3 | 3 | |
| 4 | Putra Samarinda | 3 | 0 | 1 | 2 | 2 | 7 | −5 | 1 | |

Source: RSSSF

=== Group B ===
| Pos | Team | Pld | W | D | L | GF | GA | GD | Pts | Qualification |
|---|---|---|---|---|---|---|---|---|---|---|
| 1 | Mitra Surabaya | 3 | 2 | 1 | 0 | 5 | 1 | +4 | 7 | Advance to knockout stage |
| 2 | Gelora Dewata | 3 | 1 | 2 | 0 | 4 | 3 | +1 | 5 | |
| 3 | Pelita Jaya | 3 | 1 | 0 | 2 | 6 | 6 | 0 | 3 | |
| 4 | Persita | 3 | 0 | 1 | 2 | 2 | 7 | −5 | 1 | |

Source: RSSSF

=== Group C ===
| Pos | Team | Pld | W | D | L | GF | GA | GD | Pts | Qualification |
|---|---|---|---|---|---|---|---|---|---|---|
| 1 | PSM | 3 | 3 | 0 | 0 | 3 | 0 | +3 | 9 | Advance to knockout stage |
| 2 | Persipura | 3 | 2 | 0 | 1 | 6 | 2 | +4 | 6 | Advance to knockout stage |
| 3 | Persib | 3 | 1 | 0 | 2 | 3 | 3 | 0 | 3 | |
| 4 | Mataram Indocement | 3 | 0 | 0 | 3 | 0 | 7 | −7 | 0 | |

Source: RSSSF

=== Ranking of second-placed teams ===
| Pos | Grp | Team | Pld | W | D | L | GF | GA | GD | Pts | Qualification |
|---|---|---|---|---|---|---|---|---|---|---|---|
| 1 | C | Persipura | 3 | 2 | 0 | 1 | 6 | 2 | +4 | 6 | Advance to knockout stage |
| 2 | B | Gelora Dewata | 3 | 1 | 2 | 0 | 4 | 3 | +1 | 5 | |
| 3 | A | Persikab | 3 | 1 | 1 | 1 | 4 | 4 | 0 | 4 | |

Source: RSSSF

== Knockout stage ==
Semifinals
4 October – Jakarta
PSM | 4
Persipura | 3
4 October – Jakarta
Bandung Raya (pen.) | 0 (4)
Mitra Surabaya | 0 (2)

Final
6 October – Jakarta
PSM | 0
Bandung Raya | 2

=== Semifinals ===
4 October 1996
15:30 WIB

| PSM | 4–3 | Persipura |
|---|---|---|
| Leandro 49'; Arif Kamaruddin 74'; Marcio Novo 76'; Rachman Usman 85' | Report | Alfred Repasi 11'; Ritham Madubun 28'; Ivakdalam 37' |

Gelora Senayan Main Stadium, Jakarta49
Attendance: 60.000
Referee: Sukagawa (Japan)

4 October 1996
19:00 WIB

| Bandung Raya | 0–0 | Mitra Surabaya |
|---|---|---|
| | Report |
Penalties
| Makmun Adnan (penalty scored); Hendriawan (penalty scored); Alexander Saununu (penalty scored); Nur'alim (penalty scored) | 4–2 | (penalty missed) Gomes de Oliveira; (penalty scored) Marzuki Badriawan; (penalty missed) Carlos de Mello; (penalty scored) Adhi Prianto |

Gelora Senayan Main Stadium, Jakarta
Attendance: 60.000
Referee: Katayama (Japan)

=== Final ===
6 October 1996
17:30 WIB

| PSM | 0–2 | Bandung Raya |
|---|---|---|
| | | Peri 3'; Rafni 11' |

Gelora Senayan Main Stadium, Jakarta
Attendance: 50,000
Referee: Yana Yoshihogu Katayama (Japan)

== Awards ==
=== Top scorers ===
The following is a list of the top scorers from the 1995-96 season.

| Rank | Player | Club | Goals |
|---|---|---|---|
| 1 | (Federal Republic of Yugoslavia) Dejan Gluščević | Bandung Raya | 30 |
| 2 | (Cameroon) Fouda Ntsama | Pupuk Kaltim | 23 |
| 3 | (Indonesia) Peri Sandria | Bandung Raya | 21 |
| 4 | (Indonesia) Chris Yarangga | Persipura | 20 |
| 5 | (Indonesia) Widodo C. Putro | Petrokimia Putra | 19 |

=== Best player ===
- (Indonesia) Ronny Wabia (Persipura)

== See also ==
- 1995–96 Liga Indonesia First Division
- 1995–96 Liga Indonesia Second Division
