= 1994–95 Liga Indonesia Second Division =

Liga Indonesia Second Division
- Season: 1994–95
- Dates: National phase (from second stage): 10 – 20 June 1995
- Champions: Persikabo
- Promoted: Persikabo; Persiter; PSPS; PSB

The 1994–95 Liga Indonesia Second Division was the inaugural season of the Liga Indonesia Second Division, the third-tier division of Indonesian football operating below the Premier Division and First Division, being the only amateur competition in the structure. Persikabo won the title after defeating Persiter 3–1 in the final.

== Format ==
The competition is held in two main phases, the regional phase and the national phase. The regional phase is played in stages throughout various regions in Indonesia, resulting in the best 16 teams qualifying for the national phase. The national phase is itself divided into three stages.

== Regional phase ==
The following teams were the representatives from their respective regions to be competing in the national phase.

Region	Team
Sumatra	(Jambi) Persijam
Sumatra	(West Sumatra) Persiju
Sumatra	(South Sumatra) PS Palembang
Sumatra	(North Sumatra) PSKB Binjai
Sumatra	(Riau) PSPS
Java	(Jakarta) Persija Barat
Java	(West Java) Persikabo
Java	(West Java) PSB
Java	(Special Region of Yogyakarta) PSS
Bali and Nusa Tenggara Islands	(West Nusa Tenggara) PS Mataram
Kalimantan	(East Kalimantan) Persiku Kutai
Kalimantan	(South Kalimantan) Peseban
Sulawesi	(Southeast Sulawesi) Persekabau
Sulawesi	(Southeast Sulawesi) PS Kendari
Sulawesi	(West Sulawesi) PS Polmas
Irian Jaya and Maluku Islands	(Maluku (province)) Persiter

== National phase ==
=== First stage ===
The best 16 teams from the regional phase were divided into four groups of four. The top two teams from each group will advance to the second stage.

==== Group A ====
No recorded information on the Group A match results but based on available information, PSKB Binjai and PS Palembang were the two teams who advance to the second stage.

Team	Qualification
(North Sumatra) PSKB Binjai	Advance to second stage
(South Sumatra) PS Palembang	Advance to second stage
(Jakarta) Persija Barat	
(Jambi) Persijam

Source: Arsip Sepakbola Indonesia

==== Group B ====
Pos	Team	Pld	W	D	L	GF	GA	GD	Pts	Qualification
1	(West Java) Persikabo (H)	3	3	0	0	8	2	+6	9	Advance to second stage
2	(Riau) PSPS	3	1	1	1	4	4	0	4	Advance to second stage
3	(West Sulawesi) PS Polmas	3	1	1	1	5	6	−1	4	
4	(South Kalimantan) Peseban	3	0	0	3	1	6	−5	0	

Source: Arsip Sepakbola Indonesia
(H) Hosts

==== Group C ====
Pos	Team	Pld	W	D	L	GF	GA	GD	Pts	Qualification
1	(West Java) PSB (H)	3	3	0	0	7	0	+7	9	Advance to second stage
2	(West Nusa Tenggara) PS Mataram	3	2	0	1	4	5	−1	6	Advance to second stage
3	(Southeast Sulawesi) PS Kendari	3	1	0	2	2	4	−2	3	
4	(West Sumatra) Persiju	3	0	0	3	1	5	−4	0	

Source: Arsip Sepakbola Indonesia
(H) Hosts

==== Group D ====
Pos	Team	Pld	W	D	L	GF	GA	GD	Pts	Qualification
1	(Maluku (province)) Persiter	2	2	0	0	4	2	+2	6	Advance to second stage
2	(East Kalimantan) Persiku Kutai	2	1	0	1	3	2	+1	3	Advance to second stage
3	(Special Region of Yogyakarta) PSS (H)	2	0	0	2	2	5	−3	0	
4	(Southeast Sulawesi) Persekabau (Note: Results on Group D matches were not recorded completely, including missing Persekabau results.)	0	0	0	0	0	0	0	0	

Source: Arsip Sepakbola Indonesia
(H) Hosts

=== Second stage ===
Eight teams from the first stage were divided into two groups of four. The top two teams from each group will advance to the knockout stage and achieve promotion to the First Division. All matches were held at Pajajaran Stadium in Bogor.

==== Group K ====
Pos	Team	Pld	W	D	L	GF	GA	GD	Pts	Promotion or qualification
1	(West Java) PSB (P)	3	2	1	0	4	1	+3	7	Advance to knockout stage and promotion to the First Division
2	(Riau) PSPS (P)	3	2	0	1	6	2	+4	6	Advance to knockout stage and promotion to the First Division
3	(East Kalimantan) Persiku Kutai	3	1	0	2	2	5	−3	3	
4	(South Sumatra) PS Palembang	3	0	1	2	1	5	−4	1	

Source: RSSSF
(P) Promoted

==== Group L ====
Pos	Team	Pld	W	D	L	GF	GA	GD	Pts	Promotion or qualification
1	(West Java) Persikabo (P)	3	2	1	0	7	1	+6	7	Advance to knockout stage and promotion to the First Division
2	(Maluku (province)) Persiter (P)	3	1	2	0	2	2	0	5	Advance to knockout stage and promotion to the First Division
3	(North Sumatra) PSKB Binjai	3	1	1	1	3	3	0	4	
4	(West Nusa Tenggara) PS Mataram	3	0	0	3	1	7	−6	0	

Source: RSSSF
(P) Promoted

=== Knockout stage ===
Semifinals
18 June – Bogor
Persikabo	3
PSPS	1
18 June – Bogor
PSB	1 (3)
Persiter (p)	1 (5)

Final
20 June – Bogor
Persikabo	3
Persiter	1
Match for third place
20 June – Bogor
PSB	2 (4)
PSPS (p)	2 (5)

==== Semifinals ====
18 June 1995

Persikabo (West Java)	3–1	(Riau) PSPS
	Report

Pajajaran Stadium, Bogor

18 June 1995

PSB (West Java)	1–1 (a.e.t.)	(Maluku (province)) Persiter
	Report
Penalties
	3–5

Pajajaran Stadium, Bogor

==== Match for third place ====
20 June 1995

PSB (West Java)	2–2	(Riau) PSPS
Ahmad Hamdan 80'; Sugiono 89'	Report	M. Arisandi 11'; Pujo Prasetio 25'
Penalties
	4–5

Pajajaran Stadium, Bogor

==== Final ====
20 June 1995

Persikabo (West Java)	3–1	(Maluku (province)) Persiter
Didi Suwardi 9' (pen.); Asep Sabar 25' (pen.); Anda Suwandi 88'	Report	Ikram Selang 32'

Pajajaran Stadium, Bogor

== See also ==
- 1994–95 Liga Indonesia Premier Division
- 1994–95 Liga Indonesia First Division
