= 2002 Liga Indonesia Premier Division =

Football season in Indonesia

Liga Indonesia Premier Division
- Season: 2002
- Dates: 13 January – 7 July 2002
- Champions: Petrokimia Putra; 1st Premier Division title 1st Indonesian title
- Relegated: PSBL; PSMS; Persikab; Persema; Persebaya; Persedikab
- AFC Champions League: Petrokimia Putra; Persita
- Matches: 279
- Goals: 725 (2.6 per match)
- Top goalscorer: Ilham Jaya Kesuma (26 goals)
- Biggest home win: Persita 10–1 Persikab (28 April)
- Biggest away win: PSDS 0–3 PSPS (24 January); Persikab 0–3 Persita (24 February)
- Highest scoring: Persita 10–1 Persikab (28 April)

The 2002 Liga Indonesia Premier Division (also known as the Liga Bank Mandiri for sponsorship reasons) was the eighth season of the Liga Indonesia Premier Division, the top Indonesian professional league for association football clubs, since its formation in 1994. It began on 13 January and ended on 7 July. Petrokimia Putra won the title after beating Persita 3–2 in the final.

== Teams ==
=== Team changes ===
==== Relegated from Premier Division ====
- Persijap
- Persikabo
- Persiraja
- Persma
- PSP
- Putra Samarinda

==== Promoted to Premier Division ====
- PSIS
- Persedikab

=== Stadiums and locations ===
Locations of the teams in the 2002 Liga Indonesia Premier Division.
Blue: West Region; Red: East Region

West Region
Team	Location	Stadium
Arema	Malang	Gajayana
Pelita Krakatau Steel	Cilegon	Krakatau Steel
Persib	Bandung	Siliwangi
Persija	Jakarta	Lebak Bulus
Persikab	Cimahi	Sangkuriang
Persikota	Tangerang	Benteng
PSBL	Bandar Lampung	Pahoman
Persita	Tangerang	Benteng
PSDS	Deli Serdang	Baharuddin Siregar
PSMS	Medan	Teladan
PSPS	Pekanbaru	Kaharudin Nasution
Semen Padang	Padang	Haji Agus Salim

East Region
Team	Location	Stadium
Barito Putera	Banjarmasin	May 17th
Bontang PKT	Bontang	Mulawarman
Deltras	Sidoarjo	Gelora Delta
Persebaya	Surabaya	Gelora 10 November
Persedikab	Kediri	Canda Bhirawa
Persema	Malang	Gajayana
Persijatim Solo	Surakarta	Manahan
Persipura	Jayapura	Mandala
Petrokimia Putra	Gresik	Petrokimia
PSIS	Semarang	Jatidiri
PSM	Makassar	Andi Mattalata
PSS	Sleman	Tridadi

== First stage ==
=== West Region ===
Pos	Team	Pld	W	D	L	GF	GA	GD	Pts	Qualification or relegation
1	Semen Padang	22	13	2	7	36	21	+15	41	Advance to second stage
2	Arema	22	11	5	6	31	25	+6	38	Advance to second stage
3	Persija	22	10	7	5	29	18	+11	37	Advance to second stage
4	Persita	22	10	5	7	44	25	+19	35	Advance to second stage
5	PSPS	22	9	7	6	34	16	+18	34	
6	Persikota	22	8	10	4	27	18	+9	34	
7	Pelita Krakatau Steel	22	10	3	9	28	24	+4	33	
8	Persib	22	9	5	8	26	24	+2	32	
9	PSDS	22	9	2	11	30	38	−8	29	
10	PSBL (R)	22	7	5	10	15	26	−11	26	Relegation to First Division
11	PSMS (R)	22	7	3	12	21	31	−10	24	Relegation to First Division
12	Persikab (R)	22	1	2	19	11	66	−55	5	Relegation to First Division

Source: RSSSF
(R) Relegated

=== East Region ===
Pos	Team	Pld	W	D	L	GF	GA	GD	Pts	Qualification or relegation
1	Petrokimia Putra (C)	22	12	7	3	42	22	+20	43	Advance to second stage
2	Barito Putera	22	11	6	5	30	25	+5	39	Advance to second stage
3	Persipura	22	10	4	8	43	25	+18	34	Advance to second stage
4	PSM	22	10	4	8	31	29	+2	34	Advance to second stage
5	Deltras	22	9	5	8	31	32	−1	32	
6	PKT Bontang	22	8	6	8	34	26	+8	30	
7	PSS	22	8	6	8	22	19	+3	30	
8	PSIS	22	8	6	8	20	25	−5	30	
9	Persijatim	22	9	2	11	36	38	−2	29	
10	Persema (R)	22	8	5	9	24	27	−3	29	Relegation to First Division
11	Persebaya (Note: Persebaya were docked three points for abandoning a match against PKT Bontang.) (R)	22	6	5	11	24	31	−7	20	Relegation to First Division
12	Persedikab (R)	22	2	6	14	22	60	−38	12	Relegation to First Division

Source: RSSSF
(R) Relegated

== Second stage ==
=== Group A ===
Pos	Team	Pld	W	D	L	GF	GA	GD	Pts	Qualification
1	Persita	3	3	0	0	4	1	+3	9	Advance to knockout stage
2	Petrokimia Putra	3	1	0	2	3	2	+1	3	Advance to knockout stage
3	Persipura	3	1	0	2	2	3	−1	3	
4	Arema	3	1	0	2	1	4	−3	3	

Source: RSSSF

=== Group B ===
Pos	Team	Pld	W	D	L	GF	GA	GD	Pts	Qualification
1	Semen Padang	3	3	0	0	8	2	+6	9	Advance to knockout stage
2	PSM	3	2	0	1	5	4	+1	6	Advance to knockout stage
3	Persija	3	1	0	2	2	5	−3	3	
4	Barito Putera	3	0	0	3	2	6	−4	0	

Source: RSSSF

== Knockout stage ==
Semifinals
3 July – Jakarta
Persita	2
PSM	0
4 July – Jakarta
Semen Padang	1 (2)
Petrokimia Putra (pen.)	1 (3)

Final
7 July – Jakarta
Persita	1
Petrokimia Putra (a.e.t.)	2

=== Semifinals ===
3 July 2002
17:00 (UTC+7)

Persita	2–0	PSM
Atangana 20'; Ilham 62'	Report

Gelora Bung Karno Stadium, Jakarta
Attendance: 40,000

4 July 2002
17:00 (UTC+7)

Semen Padang	1–1 (a.e.t.)	Petrokimia Putra
Kusdiyanto 33'	Report	Ichwan 64'
Penalties
Elie (penalty missed); Syafril (penalty missed); Elias (penalty scored); Rommy (penalty scored); Kusdiyanto (penalty missed)	2–3	(penalty scored) Ichwan; (penalty scored) Sasi; (penalty missed) Luciano; (penalty scored) Eloii

Gelora Bung Karno Stadium, Jakarta
Attendance: 30,000

=== Final ===
7 July 2002
16:30 (UTC+7)

Persita	1–2 (a.e.t.)	Petrokimia Putra
Ilham 1'	Report	Chelbi 73'; Eloii 93'

Gelora Bung Karno Stadium, Jakarta
Attendance: 50,000
Referee: Purwanto

== Top goalscorer and best player ==
(Indonesia) Ilham Jaya Kesuma (Persita Tangerang) - 26 goals, also the best player.

Rank	Player	Club	Goals
1	(Indonesia) Ilham Jaya Kesuma	Persita	26
2	(Cameroon) Sadissou Bako	Barito Putera	16
3	(Indonesia) Mardiansyah	Persijatim	14
3	(Indonesia) Eduard Ivakdalam	Persipura	14
4	(Indonesia) Johan Prasetyo	Arema	13
