= An-Nur Great Mosque =

Mosque in Pekanbaru, Riau, Indonesia

- Indonesian: Masjid Agung An-Nur; Jawi: مسجد اڬوڠ النور

Religion
- Affiliation: Islam
- Branch/tradition: Sunni
- Status: Active

Location
- Location: Pekanbaru, Riau, Indonesia
- Interactive map of An-Nur Great Mosque
- Coordinates: 0.5267°N 101.4508°E

Architecture
- Type: mosque
- Style: Malay, Islamic, Ottoman
- Groundbreaking: 1963
- Completed: 1968

Specifications
- Capacity: 4,500
- Dome: 10
- Minaret: 4

An-Nur Great Mosque is a mosque located in Pekanbaru, Riau, Indonesia. Its construction began in 1963 and was completed in 1968. The mosque can accommodate about 4,500 worshippers. It is one of the largest mosques in Indonesia. The mosque has influences from various architectural styles: Malay, Turkish, Arabic, and Indian.

== History ==
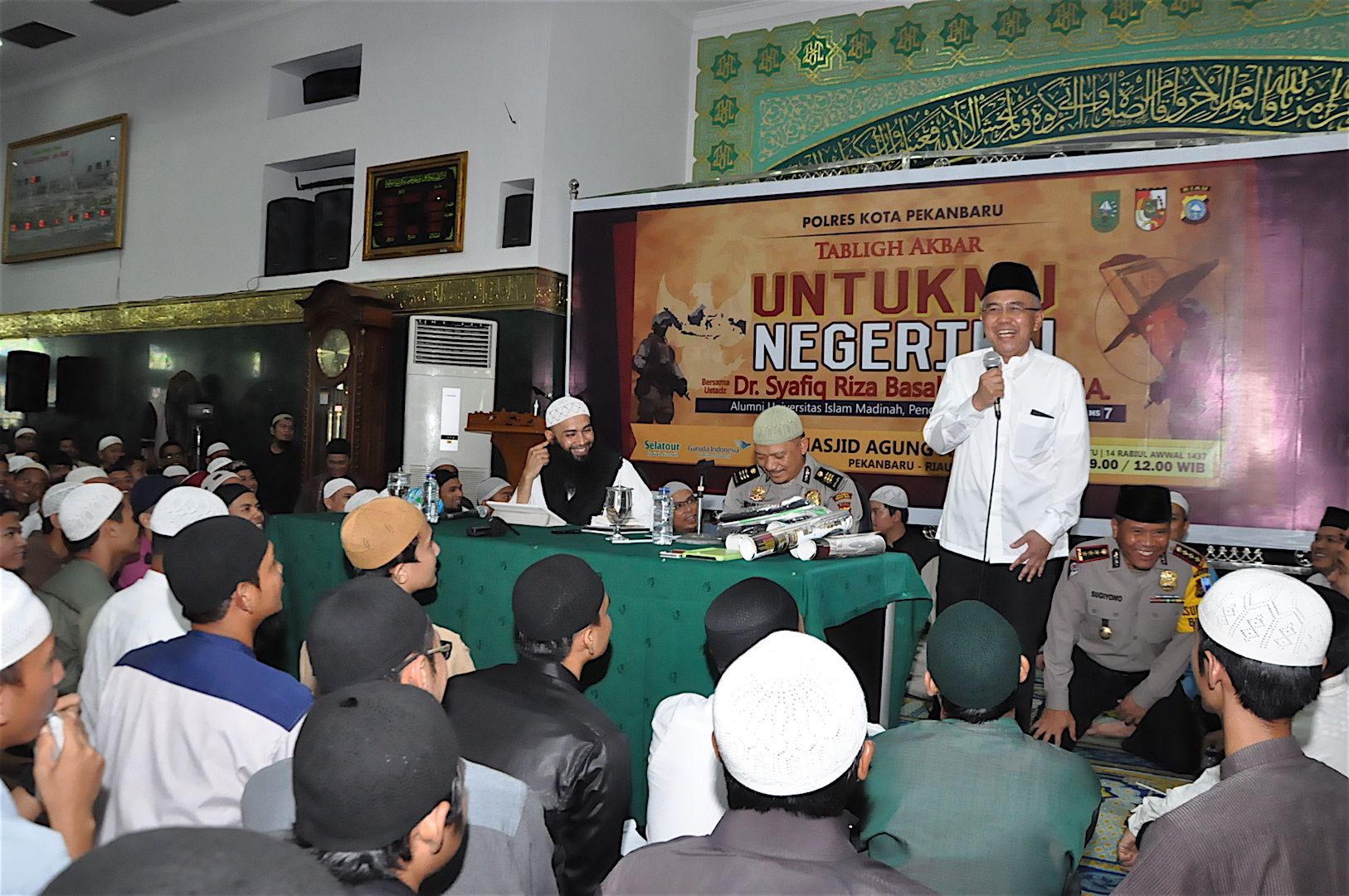
Acting Governor of Riau Arsyadjuliandi Rachman giving a speech at the lecture of Syafiq Riza Basalamah at the Great Mosque of An-Nur, 2015

Construction on the mosque was completed on 20 October 1968. It was inaugurated by Arifin Achmad, the Governor of Riau. In 2000, it was renovated during the time of Governor Saleh Djasit, with its area being tripled from 4 hectares to 12.6 hectares. Due to the renovation, the Hang Tuah football stadium was demolished.

The mosque was once a campus for the Faculty of Usul al-Din State Institute of Islamic studies (IAIN) Sultan Syarif Kasim Pekabaru from its founding until 1973. IAIN Sultan Syarif Kasim State Islamic University is now the Sultan Syarif Kasim (UIN SUSKA) Pekanbaru.

== Architecture ==
Architecturally, An-Nur is similar to the Taj Mahal. The mosque was designed by Ir. Roseno. The building consists of three floors; the top level is used for prayer and the lower level for offices and meeting rooms. The upper part consists of large rooms and a Hall. Downstairs is the Secretariat of the Board and classroom space. The building is equipped with escalators connecting floors one and two.

== See also ==
- Indonesian architecture
- Islamic architecture
- Islam in Indonesia
- List of mosques in Indonesia
