= Sadissou Bako =

Cameroonian footballer (born 1976)

Personal information
- Full name: Mohamadou Sadissou Bako
- Date of birth: 28 February 1976 (age 50)
- Place of birth: Yaoundé, Cameroon
- Height: 1.80 m (5 ft 11 in)
- Position: Striker

Team information
- Current team: Barito Putera U21 (assistant coach )

Youth career
- Tonnerre Yaoundé

Senior career*
Years	Team	Apps	(Gls)
1994–1995	Tonnerre Yaoundé	4	(0)
1995–1996	PSB Bogor	16	(5)
1996–1997	PSMS Medan	18	(7)
1999–2000	Pelita Solo	24	(10)
2001–2002	Barito Putera	40	(39)
2003–2004	Persipura Jayapura	28	(15)
2005–2006	Persema Malang	18	(7)
2007–2009	Persih Tembilahan	25	(17)
2010–2011	PS Bengkulu	11	(3)
Total		170	(98)

Managerial career
- 2011–12: Persih Tembilahan
- 2013–14: Trang FC
- 2015–16: Barito Putera U21 (Ass. Coach)
- * Club domestic league appearances and goals

Mohamadou Sadissou Bako or Sadissou Bako or Bako Sadissou, (born 28 February 1976 in Yaoundé, Cameroon) is a Cameroonian former football player and manager who played as a central striker. He retired in the end of 2010-11 season after played for PS Bengkulu with 3 goals in 11 appearances. He currently serves as caretaker manager for Persih Tembilahan after he previously worked as an assistant coach for Raja Faisal.

== Career ==
=== Cameroon ===
The former Tonnerre striker cited François Omam-Biyik as a professional mentor and stated that his ambition is to represent the national team in international competition.

=== Indonesia ===
He got to Indonesia, the 1.8 m tall striker gratified veteran Maboang Kessack of Indomitable Lions’ fame who he described as his "personal manager" for teaching him certain techniques and charting the course for his professional football in Indonesia. He started his career in Indonesia with played for PSB Bogor after that in a row he played for PSMS Medan, Pelita Solo, Persipura Jayapura, Persema Malang, Barito Putera, Persih Tembilahan and PS Bengkulu.

In 2001 Sadissou Bako who plays for division one side, Barito Putera closed the season as the highest goal scorer in the Indonesian premiership with a treasurer of 22 goals.

In the end of 2010-11 season after played for PS Bengkulu. Over all he scored 72 goals in Indonesian football competition.

In 2011-12 season he started his managerial career as an assistant coach of the club Persih Tembilahan, before he replaced the head coach and served as caretaker coach. In his debut as coach, his team defeated by a score of 0-2 of the Persis Solo.

== Personal life ==
His brother is also a professional footballer named Muhamadou Tassiou Bako currently playing for Madura United.

== Honours ==
Individual

- Liga Indonesia Premier Division Top Goalscorer: 2001
