= Marco Mourmada =

Chadian footballer (born 1976)

Marco
Personal information
- Full name: Marco Mourmada
- Date of birth: 12 December 1976 (age 49)
- Place of birth: N'Djamena, Chad
- Height: 1.86 m (6 ft 1 in)
- Position: Midfielder

Senior career*
Years	Team	Apps	(Gls)
1992–1995	Gazelle FC		
1995–1997	Witbank Aces		
1997–1998	Medan Jaya	28	(11)
1998–2000	PSPS Pekanbaru	25	(4)
2000–2001	PSMS Medan	26	(8)
2001–2002	Sun Hei	25	(2)
2002–2003	PSMS Medan	28	(17)
2003–2004	Pelita Jaya	24	(5)
2004–2005	PSMS Medan	22	(8)
Total		60+	(30+)

International career
1992	Chad	1	(0)
- * Club domestic league appearances and goals

Marco Mourmada (born 12 December 1976) is a Chadian former footballer who previously played as a midfielder for PSMS Medan and the Chad national football team.

== Career statistics ==
=== International ===
Appearances and goals by national team and year
National team	Year	Apps	Goals
Chad	1992	1	0
Total		1	0
