= Persikabo Bogor =

Indonesian football club

Persikabo
- Full name: Persatuan Sepakbola Indonesia Kabupaten Bogor
- Nicknames: Laskar Padjajaran (Pajajaran Warriors); Maung Kumbang (Black Panther)
- Founded: 23 December 1973; 52 years ago (old); 2025; 1 year ago (refounded)
- Ground: Pakansari Stadium; Bogor, West Java
- Capacity: 30,000
- Owner: PT. Laskar Padjajaran Bogor
- League: Liga 4
- 2025–26: Liga 4, 3rd in Group L (West Java zone, Series 2)
- Website: www.persikabo-bogor.com
Home colours	Away colours

Persatuan Sepakbola Indonesia Kabupaten Bogor, simply known as Persikabo, is a football club based in Bogor Regency, West Java. The club is set to compete in Liga 4 West Java Series 2 after six years' absence from the Indonesian football league system. Their home stadium is Pakansari Stadium and also used Persikabo Stadium for training facilities.

Persikabo Bogor had their nicknames Laskar Padjajaran (Padjajaran Warriors) and Maung Kumbang (Black Panther). Their most well-known supporter groups include Kabomania (Kabupaten Bogor Mania) and UPCS (Ultras Persikabo Curva Sud).

== History ==
=== Old Persikabo (1973–2019) ===
Persikabo was founded on 23 December 1973, a football club from Bogor Regency, or known by the nickname Laskar Pajajaran, officially founded by several Musyawarah Pimpinan Daerah (Muspida; lit. 'Regional Leadership Conference') and football practitioners in Bogor Regency, such as, Caca Samita who at that time served as the Regent of Bogor, Lieutenant Colonel Djuari (Chairman of the Bogor Regency DPRD), Didi Suwardi (General Chairperson of the Bogor Regency KONI), Abdullah Alwahdi (member of the Bogor Regency DPRD), and Armen Syafii (General Secretary of KONI).

After being officially established and registered with PSSI (Football Association of Indonesia), the founder of Persikabo appointed or chose Abdulah Alwahdi as the first General Chairman of Persikabo. Armen Syafii was appointed as the first General Secretary. Meanwhile, Bogor football legend, Roni Toisuta, became the first captain of the Persikabo Bogor in the official national football scene. Meanwhile, Budi Riyadi is the first referee belonging to Persikabo whose status is recognized as a national referee.

Although it has been around for quite a long time, this team only started to be known when Indonesian football entered the professional league era, to be precise, in the 1994–95 season. It is understandable because in the first season of the competition labeled the Liga Indonesia, Persikabo emerged as the champion of Second Division and was promoted to First Division.

After only two seasons in the second tier of the national football competition, this club successfully broke through to the highest stage of national football at that time, the Premier Division. Unfortunately, after only two seasons in the top division, the team was relegated back to First Division.

After just one season of relegation, the team returned to the Premier Division, precisely in the 1999–00 competition season. But once again, the team on the outskirts of Jakarta was not strong enough to survive in the Premier Division, and only appeared for one season before being relegated back to First Division. After that, the club's achievements continued to decline until they returned to Second Division. It was only in the 2004 season that they returned to First Division and the following two seasons to the Premier Division. But in the fight for tickets to the Super League, this team failed because it only ranked 11th in the West Division.

Persikabo merged with PS TIRA (previously known as Persiram Raja Ampat) in 2019 so they can compete instantly in Liga 1 without promotion as PS TIRA-Persikabo.

=== New Persikabo (2025–) ===
Persikabo started their new season in the Indonesian football system in the 2025 Liga 4 West Java Series 2. However, they had to fall in the first phase, occupying 3rd place in group L, with a result of 1 win, 1 draw, and 1 loss.

== Players ==
=== Current squad ===
As of

Note: Flags indicate national team as defined under FIFA eligibility rules; some limited exceptions apply. Players may hold more than one non-FIFA nationality.

No. / Pos. / Nation / Player	No. / Pos. / Nation / Player

== Honours ==
- Liga Indonesia First Division
  - Third-place (2): 1996–97, 1999–00
- Liga Indonesia Second Division
  - Champion (1): 1994–95

== Stadiums ==
Persikabo initially played at Pajajaran Stadium in Bogor City shared with PSB Bogor, and they later moved to the newly built Persikabo Stadium (known as Stadion Mini Cibinong) located at Bogor Regency Government Building Complex, Cibinong. Persikabo Stadium was later used as training ground when they moved to Pakansari Stadium in 2014.

== Supporters and rivalries ==
Persikabo is supported by Kabomania, short for Kabupaten Bogor Mania, then the ultras sub-culture called Ultras Persikabo Curva Sud (UPCS). Some other small groups, such as Militan 1973, RCF, and others. His supporters are mainly based in Bogor Regency, as well as some in border areas such as Depok City and Bogor City.

Persikabo initially had a fierce rivalry with Persija Jakarta, known as the Jagorawi derby. This is marked by clashes that occur between supporters of both clubs even when they are not playing. In addition, other rivalries are with Persib Bandung, which is called the Pasundan derby, with Persikad Depok in the Ciliwung derby, and with PSB Bogor in the Bogor derby.

== Season-by-season records ==
Season	League	Tms.	Pos.	Piala Indonesia
Old Persikabo
1994–95	Second Division		1st	—
1995–96	First Division	24	3rd, Group 1 (Central)	—
1996–97	First Division	20	3rd	—
1997–98	Premier Division	31	did not finish	—
1998–99	Premier Division	28	relegation play-off loser	—
1999–00	First Division	21	3rd	—
2001	Premier Division	28	14th, West division	—
2002	First Division	27	6th, Group 2	—
2003	Second Division	28	3rd, Second round	—
2004	Second Division	41	4th	—
2005	First Division	27	6th, Group 1	—
2006	First Division	36	4th, Second round	—
2007–08	Premier Division	36	11th, West division	—
2008–09	Premier Division	29	4th, Second round	—
2009–10	Premier Division	33	4th, Group 1	—
2010–11	Premier Division	39	8th, Group 1	—
2011–12 (LPIS)	Premier Division	28	3rd, Group 1	—
2013 (LI)	Premier Division	38	4th	—
2014	Premier Division	63	4th, Second round	—
2015	Premier Division	55	did not finish	—
2016	Indonesia Soccer Championship B	53	6th, Group 2	—
2017	Liga 2	61	8th, Group 2	—
2018	Liga 3	32	eliminated in national zone route	—
New Persikabo (refounded)
2025–26	Liga 4 (West Java Series 2)	47	3rd, Group L	—
2026–27	Liga 4 (West Java Series 2)		TBD	—

Champion	Runner-up	Promotion	Relegation
