= Carlos de Mello =

Brazilian footballer (born 1967)

Personal information
- Full name: Antonio Carlos de Mello Machedo
- Date of birth: 10 April 1967 (age 59)
- Place of birth: Brazil
- Position: Midfielder

Senior career*
Years	Team	Apps	(Gls)
1994–1995	Petrokimia Putra		
1995–1996	Mitra Surabaya		
1996–1997	Persebaya Surabaya		
1997–2001	PSM Makassar		
2001–2002	Persita Tangerang		

Managerial career
- 2006–2007: PSM Makassar
- 2011–2013: Indonesia Students
- 2017: PSGC Ciamis
- * Club domestic league appearances and goals

Antonio Carlos de Mello Machedo (born 10 April 1967) is a Brazilian retired footballer.

== Career ==
Though they were told their destination was Malaysia, de Mello arrived in Indonesia alongside five other Brazilians to play football. He signed with Petrokimia Putra and helped them reach the 1994/95 league final.

Nicknamed 'The Duck' due to appearing overweight and slow, de Mello endeared himself to fans in Indonesia with his composure and passing ability, resulting in comparisons to England footballer Matt Le Tissier.
