= Hang Tuah Stadium (Pekanbaru) =

Stadium in Indonesia

- Location in Riau
- Location: Pekanbaru, Riau, Indonesia
- Coordinates: 0.526656°N 101.452728°E
- Owner: PSPS Pekanbaru
- Operator: PSPS Pekanbaru
- Capacity: 5,000 (Football)
- Surface: Grass

Construction
- Closed: 2000
- Demolished: 2000

Tenant
- PSPS Pekanbaru (2000)

Hang Tuah Stadium was formerly a multi-use stadium in Pekanbaru, Riau, Indonesia. It was normally used for football matches and as the home venue for PSPS Pekanbaru of the Liga Indonesia. The stadium had a capacity of 5,000 spectators.

In 2000, the stadium was demolished due to the expansion of Mosque An-Nur as well as the development a public park surrounding the mosque.
