= Persikab Bandung =

Indonesian football club

- Full name: Persatuan Sepakbola Indonesia Kabupaten Bandung
- Nicknames: Laskar Dalem Bandung; Pasukan Dipati Ukur
- Short name: PKAB; BDG
- Founded: 27 July 1963; 63 years ago
- Ground: Si Jalak Harupat Stadium
- Capacity: 27,000
- Owner: PT Persikab Bandung Bedas
- Manager: Eddy Moelyo
- Coach: Rasiman
- League: Liga 4
- 2024–25: Liga Nusantara/Relegation Round (Group J), 3rd (relegated)
| Home colours | Away colours |

Persatuan Sepakbola Indonesia Kabupaten Bandung or Persikab is an Indonesian football club based in Bandung Regency, West Java. They compete in the Liga 4. Their nickname is "Dalem Bandung Warriors" (Indonesian: Laskar Dalem Bandung).

== Rivalries ==
Persikab Bandung has a rivalry with Persib Bandung which is called the Bandung derby. It was especially popular in the 1990s to 2000s.

== History ==
Persikab Bandung was established on 27 July 1963, although they have been around for a long time, they only got back into the national football competition when the regent of Bandung Regency at that time, H.U Hatta Djatipermana served as general chairman of Persikab Bandung, the best achievement achieved by Perikab Bandung was winning Liga Indonesia First Division in the 1995 season.

Persikab joined in 1995 Liga Indonesia First Division Central Group I along with Persitara Jakarta Utara, PSJS Jakarta Selatan, and PSGC Ciamis, their struggle in the Big 8 was held at the Klabat Stadium. Persikab joined in Group B with Persedikab Kediri, PSSB Bireuen, and Persma Manado. After a 1–1 draw with Persedikab, they are almost certain to qualify for the semifinals after a 4–1 win over PSSB. they managed to qualify for the semifinals after they drew 0–0 with Persma Manado, and they qualified for the final after a 2–0 win over PSBL Langsa. And finally they won the 1995 Liga Indonesia First Division after victory in the final round over Persma Manado 2–1 and was promoted to Liga Indonesia Premier Division.

On 11 November 1999, Persib Bandung had to lose to city rivals, Persikab Bandung in the 1999–2000 Liga Indonesia Premier Division. The match, entitled Bandung derby which took place at the Siliwangi Stadium, which ended a 1–0 victory for Persikab. Persikab's single goal was scored by Heri Rafni Kotari in the 39th minute.

== Stadium ==
Persikab play their home matches at Si Jalak Harupat Stadium.

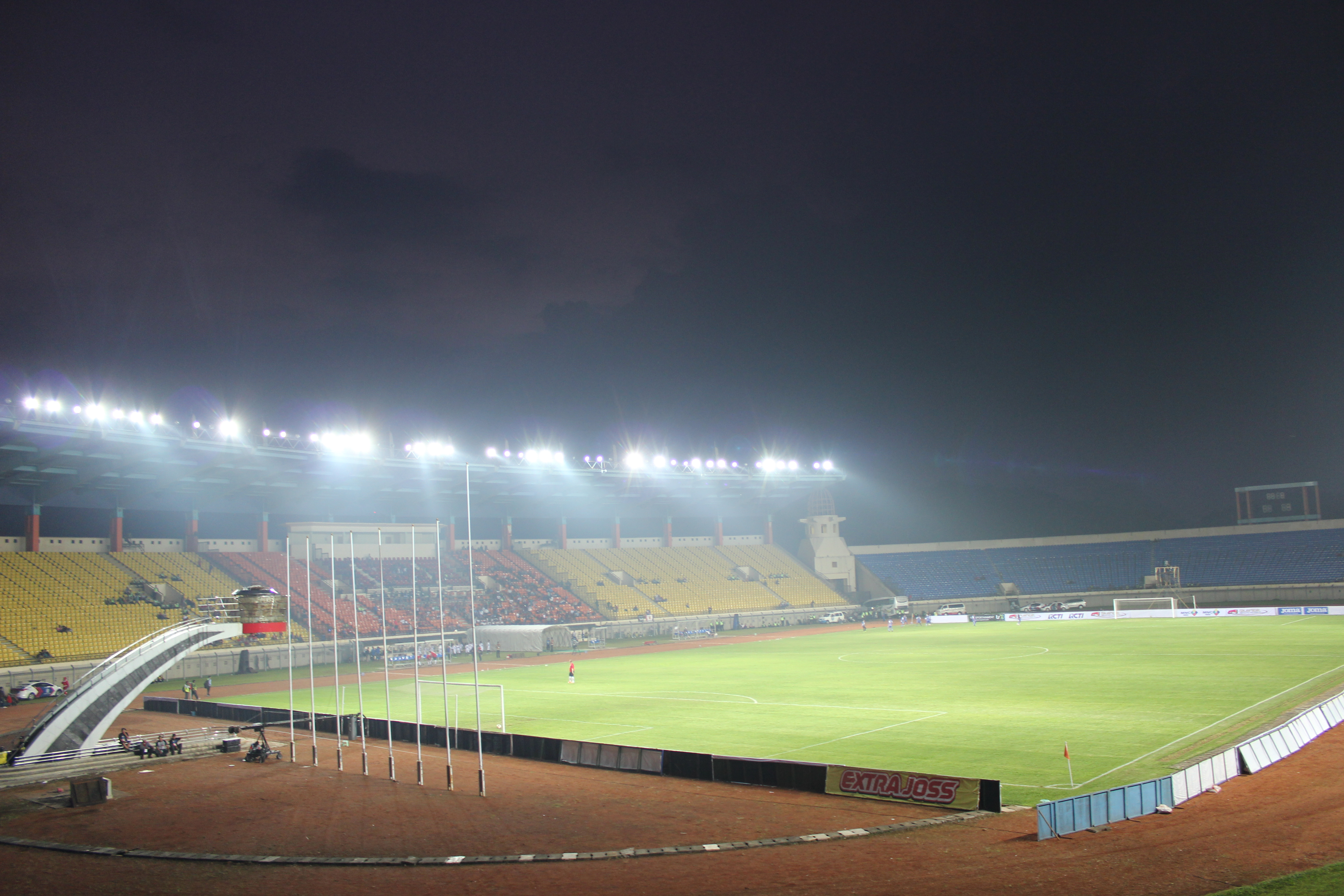
Si Jalak Harupat Stadium

== Official staff ==
| Position | Name |
|---|---|
| Manager | (Indonesia) Eddy Moelyo |
| Technical director | (Indonesia) Rudy William Keltjes |
| Head coach | (Indonesia) Rasiman |
| Assistant coach | (Indonesia) Ahmad Rifai Nugroho |
| Assistant coach | (Indonesia) Muslim Habibi |
| Physical Coach | (Indonesia) Abil Mahdi Almuhdlor |
| Goalkeeper Coach | (Indonesia) Johan Setiawan |
| Assistant Goalkepper Coach | (Indonesia) Bayu Cahyo Wibowo |
| Doctor team | (Indonesia) dr. Unggul Guligah |

== Players ==
=== Current squad ===
As of 15 December 2024

Note: Flags indicate national team as defined under FIFA eligibility rules; some limited exceptions apply. Players may hold more than one non-FIFA nationality.

| No. | Pos. | Nation | Player |
|---|---|---|---|
| 1 | GK | IDN | Aldino Fanani |
| 2 | DF | IDN | Rizky Dwi Nugraha |
| 3 | DF | IDN | Chairul Rifan |
| 5 | DF | IDN | Restu Agung |
| 6 | MF | IDN | Qaqa Basham |
| 7 | MF | IDN | Firman Januari |
| 8 | MF | IDN | Ranno Karenano |
| 9 | FW | IDN | Sansan Husaeni (captain) |
| 10 | MF | IDN | Haikal Khalil |
| 11 | FW | IDN | Agung Putra |
| 15 | MF | IDN | Didit Agus |
| 16 | MF | IDN | Muhammad Ghiffari |
| 17 | MF | IDN | Hamsa Lestaluhu |
| 18 | MF | IDN | Risky Dwiyan |
| 19 | DF | IDN | Gazi Al Ghifari |

| No. | Pos. | Nation | Player |
|---|---|---|---|
| 21 | FW | IDN | Fahmi Arizi |
| 23 | DF | IDN | Tifatul Ulfi |
| 26 | FW | IDN | Resi Wahyudi |
| 27 | DF | IDN | Sampari Wardjukur |
| 28 | MF | IDN | Manzila Fizal |
| 29 | DF | IDN | Baihaqi Rifai (on loan from Persija Jakarta) |
| 32 | DF | IDN | Indra Mustafa |
| 33 | DF | IDN | Irfan Maulana |
| 53 | DF | IDN | Gesang Hidayatullah |
| 55 | MF | IDN | Refyanshah |
| 56 | DF | IDN | Ilham Akbar |
| 66 | DF | IDN | Iqbal Ambani |
| 92 | MF | IDN | Bayu Nugroho |
| 93 | GK | IDN | Utam Rusdiana |
| 99 | FW | IDN | Diego Banowo |

== Season-by-season records ==
| Season | League/Division | Tms. | Pos. | Piala Indonesia |
|---|---|---|---|---|
| 1994–95 | First Division | 16 | 1 | – |
| 1995–96 | Premier Division | 31 | 2nd, Second round | – |
| 1996–97 | Premier Division | 33 | 8th, West division | – |
| 1997–98 | Premier Division | 31 | did not finish | – |
| 1998–99 | Premier Division | 28 | 4th, Group C | – |
| 1999–2000 | Premier Division | 28 | 11th, West division | – |
| 2001 | Premier Division | 28 | 11th, West division | – |
| 2002 | Premier Division | 24 | 12th, West division | – |
| 2003 | First Division | 26 | 6th, Group B | – |
| 2004 | Second Division | 41 | 3rd, First round | – |
| 2005 | Second Division | 23 | Second round | – |
| 2006 | First Division | 36 | 3rd, Group 2 | Round of 16 |
| 2007 | First Division | 40 | 3rd, Group 2 | First round |
| 2008–09 | Premier Division | 29 | 5th, Group 1 | Second round |
| 2009–10 | Premier Division | 33 | 4th, Group 2 | – |
| 2010–11 | Premier Division | 39 | 7th, Group 2 | First round |
| 2011–12 | Premier Division (LPIS) | 28 | 9th, Group 2 | Second round |
| 2013 | Premier Division (LPIS) | 21 | 5th, Group 1 | – |
| 2014 | Premier Division | 63 | 8th, Group 3 | – |
| 2015 | Liga Nusantara | season abandoned | | – |
| 2016 | ISC Liga Nusantara | 32 | | – |
| 2017 | Liga 3 | 32 | Eliminated in provincial round | – |
| 2018 | Liga 3 | 32 | Eliminated in regional round | – |
| 2019 | Liga 3 | 32 | Eliminated in regional round | – |
| 2020 | Liga 3 | season abandoned | | – |
| 2021–22 | Liga 3 | 64 | 2rd, Third round | – |
| 2022–23 | Liga 2 | 28 | did not finish | – |
| 2023–24 | Liga 2 | 28 | 4th, Relegation round | – |
| 2024–25 | Liga Nusantara | 16 | 3rd, Relegation round | – |

== Honours ==
- Liga Indonesia First Division
  - Champion: 1994–95
- Liga 3 West Java Series 1
  - Champion: 2021
