= Persibri Batanghari =

Indonesian football club

Persibri
- Full name: Persatuan Sepakbola Indonesia Batanghari
- Nickname: Laskar Bujang Jantan
- Founded: 1960; 66 years ago
- Dissolved: 2023; 3 years ago, merged with Batanghari FC
- Ground: KONI Batanghari Stadium, Batanghari Regency
- Capacity: 10,000
- Owner: PSSI Batanghari Regency
- Chairman: Syafril Saputra
- Manager: Muhammad Zaki
- Coach: Medianto
- League: Liga 3
- 2019: 1st, (Jambi zone)
Home colours	Away colours

Persatuan Sepakbola Indonesia Batanghari (simply known as Persibri) is an Indonesian football club based in Muara Bulian, Batanghari Regency, Jambi. They currently compete in the Liga 4 Jambi zone.

== Honours ==
- Liga 3 Jambi
  - Champion: 2019
