= Cot Gapu Stadium =

Stadium in Aceh, Indonesia

- Location in Aceh, Northern Sumatra, Sumatra and Indonesia Cot Gapu Stadium (Northern Sumatra) Cot Gapu Stadium (Sumatra) Cot Gapu Stadium (Indonesia)
- Address: Indonesia
- Location: Bireuën, Bireuën Regency, Aceh
- Coordinates: 5°12′26″N 96°43′28″E
- Owner: Government of Bireuën Regency
- Operator: Government of Bireuën Regency
- Capacity: 15,000
- Surface: Grass field

Tenants
- PSSB Bireun; Aceh United

Cot Gapu Stadium was a multi-use stadium in Bireuën, Indonesia. It is used mostly for football matches and is home stadium of PSSB Bireun. The stadium holds 15,000 people.
