= PS Bengkulu =

Indonesian football club

- Full name: Persatuan Sepak Bola Bengkulu
- Nicknames: The Sumatran Rhino; Tobo Kito Warriors
- Founded: 1968; 58 years ago
- Ground: Semarak Stadium
- Capacity: 10,000
- Owner: PSSI Bengkulu City
- Chairman: Akhmad Mazoola
- Manager: Alboy Novebra
- Coach: Thomas Yuliandra
- League: Liga 4
- 2021: 3rd, (Bengkulu zone)
Home colours	Away colours

Persatuan Sepakbola Bengkulu (simply known as PS Bengkulu) is an Indonesian football club based in Bengkulu, Bengkulu Province. They currently compete in the Liga 4.

== Honours ==
- Liga 3 Bengkulu
  - Third-place: 2021

== Seasons ==
=== Perserikatan Era ===
Season	Division	Position	Notes
1985	Eastern Group Perserikatan	6	
1986–87	Perserikatan Premier Division		
1987–88	Premier Division of Perserikatan		
1988–89	Premier Division of Perserikatan		
1990	Perserikatan		Relegated
1991–92	West Region First Division	1	Winner
1992–93	Premier Division of Perserikatan		
1993–94	Premier Division of Perserikatan		

=== Premier Division Era ===
Season	Division	Position	Notes
1994–95	West Region Premier Division	16	Relegated
1995–96	Division One		
1996–97	Division One		
1997–98	Unknown		^{1}
1998–99	Unknown		
1999–2000	Unknown		
2001	Unknown		
2002	Unknown		
2003	Division Two	Round 1	
2004	Division Two	Round 1	
2005	Division Two	Round 1	
2006	Division Two	Round 1	
2007	Division Two		Withdrew

^{1} not finish season (was stopped on 25 May 1998)

=== Liga Indonesia Era ===
Season	Division	Position	Notes
2008–09	Second Division		promoted^{2}
2009–10	First Division	6th	promoted
2010–11	Premier Division		
2013	Premier Division		
2014	Premier Division		
2017	Premier Division		Relegated
2018	Liga 3		Not participated
2019	Liga 3		Not participated
2020	Liga 3		Cancelled due to the COVID-19 pandemic
2021–22	Liga 3	3rd (Bengkulu zone)	
2022	Liga 3	(Bengkulu zone)	
2023–24	Liga 3		Not participated
2024–25	Liga 4		Not participated

^{2} Fourth level is Division Two (after ISL, Premier Division, Division One) since 2008
