= Kamal Djunaedi Stadium =

Stadium in Central Java, Indonesia

Coordinates: 6°35′44″S 110°39′35″E

Kamal Junaidi Stadium
- SKJ
- Interactive map of Kamal Junaidi Stadium
- Location: Jepara, Jepara Regency, Central Java, Indonesia
- Owner: Government of Jepara Regency
- Capacity: 15,000
- Surface: grass
- Field size: 105 x 68 m

Construction
- Opened: 1985
- Cost: 2 miliar Rupiah

Tenant
- Persijap Jepara (1954 - 2007)

Kamal Djunaedi Stadium is a multi-use stadium in Jepara, Indonesia. It is currently used mostly for football matches and was previously the home stadium of Persijap Jepara. The stadium holds 15,000 people.
