= Mandala Krida Stadium =

Sporting venue in Yogyakarta, Indonesia

- Stadion Mandala Krida ꦱꦼꦠꦝꦶꦪꦺꦴꦤ꧀ꦩꦤ꧀ꦢꦭꦏꦿꦶꦢ
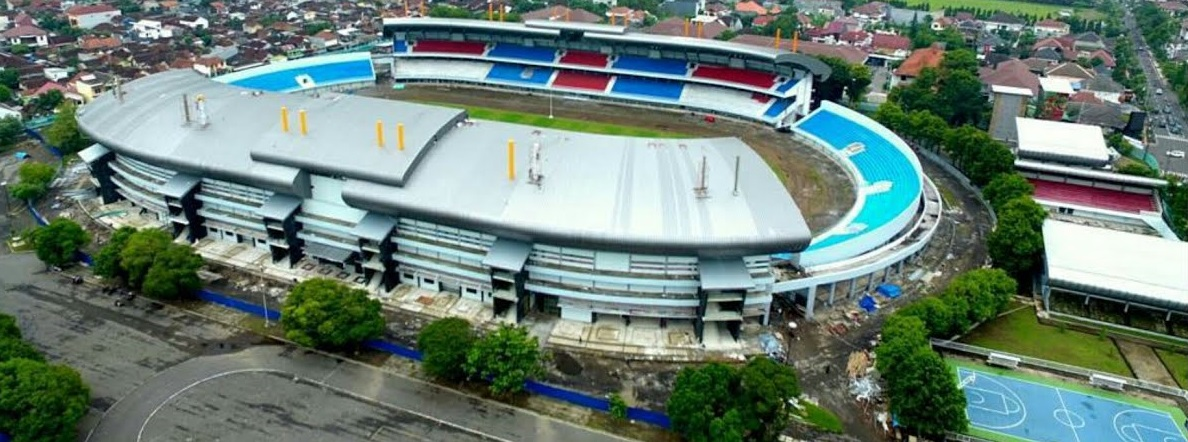

- Location in Yogyakarta
- Address: Semaki, Umbulharjo, Yogyakarta, Special Region of Yogyakarta; Indonesia
- Location: Yogyakarta, Special Region of Yogyakarta
- Coordinates: 7°47′45″S 110°23′03″E
- Owner: Government of Yogyakarta City
- Operator: Government of Yogyakarta City
- Capacity: 25,000
- Surface: Grass field
- Public transit: Trans Jogja: 2A (Kenari 1), 2B (Kenari 2)

Construction
- Renovated: 2013

Tenant
- PSIM Yogyakarta

Mandala Krida Stadium (Indonesian: Stadion Mandala Krida; Javanese: ꦱꦼꦠꦝꦶꦪꦺꦴꦤ꧀ꦩꦤ꧀ꦢꦭꦏꦿꦶꦢ, romanized: Setadhiyon Mandala Krida) is a football stadium located in Yogyakarta, Yogyakarta Special Region, Indonesia. The stadium is surrounded by three roads, east is the Gondosuli Road, south is Kenari Road, and west is the Andung Road. The stadium is used mostly for football matches in general and also held several large events in the city, such as concerts, the presidential campaign, and Eid prayers. The stadium is home of PSIM Yogyakarta and was venue of major league games Medco 4 in 2008. The new stadium can accommodate 25,000 people.
