= Persiss Sorong =

Indonesian football club

Persiss
- Full name: Persatuan Sepakbola Indonesia Seluruh Sorong
- Nickname: The Golden Cendrawasih
- Founded: 1970; 56 years ago
- Ground: Wombik Stadium; Sorong, Southwest Papua
- Capacity: 7,000
- Owner: Sorong Regency Government
- League: Liga 4
- 2025–26: 3rd, Group B (Southwest Papua zone)
Home colours	Away colours

Persatuan Sepakbola Indonesia Seluruh Sorong (simply known as a Persiss) is an Indonesian football club based in Sorong Regency, Southwest Papua. This club competed in the Liga 4.

Persiss are rivals of the club Persikos Sorong and since 2003 have competed with Persisos South Sorong with the title of the Greater Sorong derby.

Persiss is the first club defended by Solossa brothers, namely Boaz Solossa, Ortizan Solossa, and Nehemia Solossa.
