= Pajajaran Stadium =

Multi-use stadium in Bogor, Indonesia

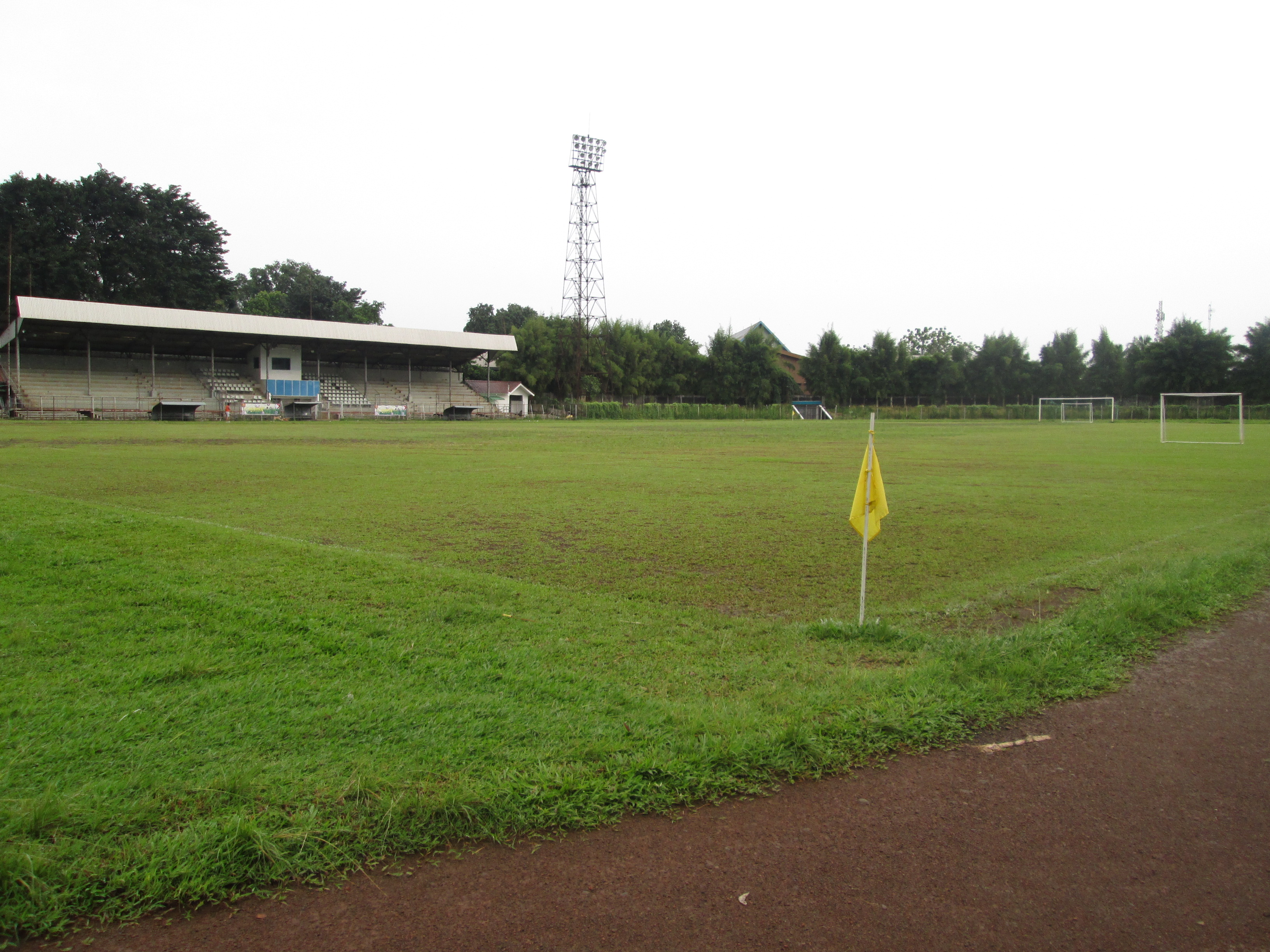
- Pajajaran Stadium

- Location in Indonesia Pajajaran Stadium (West Java) Pajajaran Stadium (Java) Pajajaran Stadium (Indonesia)
- Address: Jl. Pemuda No.2, Tanah Sareal, Tanah Sereal, Bogor, West Java 16162; Indonesia
- Location: Bogor, West Java
- Coordinates: 6°34′38″S 106°47′52″E
- Owner: City Government of Bogor
- Operator: City Government of Bogor
- Capacity: 12,000
- Surface: Grass field

Tenants
- PSB Bogor; Bogor Raya; Pakuan City

Pajajaran Stadium is a multi-use stadium in Bogor, Indonesia. It is currently used mostly for football matches and is used as the home venue for PSB Bogor. The stadium holds 12,000 people.
