= Liga Indonesia First Division =

- Founded: 1994; 32 years ago
- Folded: 2015
- Country: Indonesia
- Confederation: AFC
- Number of clubs: 73 (2014)
- Level on pyramid: 3
- Promotion to: Premier Division
- Relegation to: Second Division
- Domestic cup: Piala Indonesia
- Last champions: Cilegon United (1st title)
- Most championships: Persebaya Surabaya (2 titles)
- Broadcaster(s): MNCTV (final only)
- Website: Official site of BLAI

Liga Indonesia First Division (Indonesian: Divisi Satu Liga Indonesia) was the third level football competition in Indonesian football league system (often called as Liga Indonesia). This competition is managed by the Football Association of Indonesia (PSSI).

Prior to 2008, the formation of Indonesia Super League, First Division was on the second tier.

After the establishment of the Liga Nusantara in 2014, in 2015 the First Division was dissolved.

== Championship history ==
=== 1994–2008 (second-tier) ===
Season	Winners	Result	Runner-up
1994–95	Persikab Bandung	2–1	Persma Manado
1995–96	PSP Padang	4–2	Persedikab Kediri
1996–97	Persikota Tangerang	3–1	PSIM Yogyakarta
1998	no competition		
1999	PSPS Pekanbaru	1–0	Indocement
2000	Persita Tangerang	1–0	PSS Sleman
2001	PSIS Semarang	by table	Persedikab Kediri
2002	Persik Kediri	by table	Perseden Denpasar
2003	Persebaya Surabaya	by table	PSMS Medan
2004	Arema Malang	1–0 (aet)	PSDS Deli Serdang
2005	PSIM Yogyakarta	2–1	Persiwa Wamena
2006	Persebaya Surabaya	2–0	Persis Solo
2007	Persibo Bojonegoro	1–0	Persikad Depok

=== 2008–2014 (third-tier) ===
Season	Winners	Result	Runner-up
2008	PS Mojokerto Putra	1–0	PPSM Sakti Magelang
2009–10	Persekam Metro	0–0 (4–1, pso)	Persemalra Southeast Maluku
2010	PSBS Biak Numfor	1–0	Persbul Buol
2011–12 (LPIS)	Persekap Pasuruan	2–1	Persap Purbalingga
2012 (BLAI)	Perseka Kaimana	2–1	PS Bangka
2013	PS Kwarta	1–0	Persinga Ngawi
2014	Cilegon United	1–1 (3–0, pso)	Persibat Batang

== Awards ==
=== Top scorer ===
Season	Players	Clubs	Goals
1994–95			
1995–96			
1996–97			
1998	no competition		
1999	Abdul Manan	Persijatim East Jakarta	13
2000	M. Eksan	PSS Sleman	11
2001	Aliyudin Ali	Indocement Cirebon	9
2002			
2003	Cristian Carrasco	Persim Maros	24
2004			
2005			
2006	Mardiansyah	Persikabo Bogor	14
2007			
2008–09			
2009–10			
2010–11			
2011–12			
2012			
2013			

== Broadcasters ==
- TVRI (semi-finals and final only): 2009–10, 2010–11, 2011–12
- MNCTV (final only): 2013
