= Gelora Haji Agus Salim Stadium =

Stadium in Padang, West Sumatra, Indonesia

Coordinates: 0°55′46″S 100°21′30″E

- GHAS
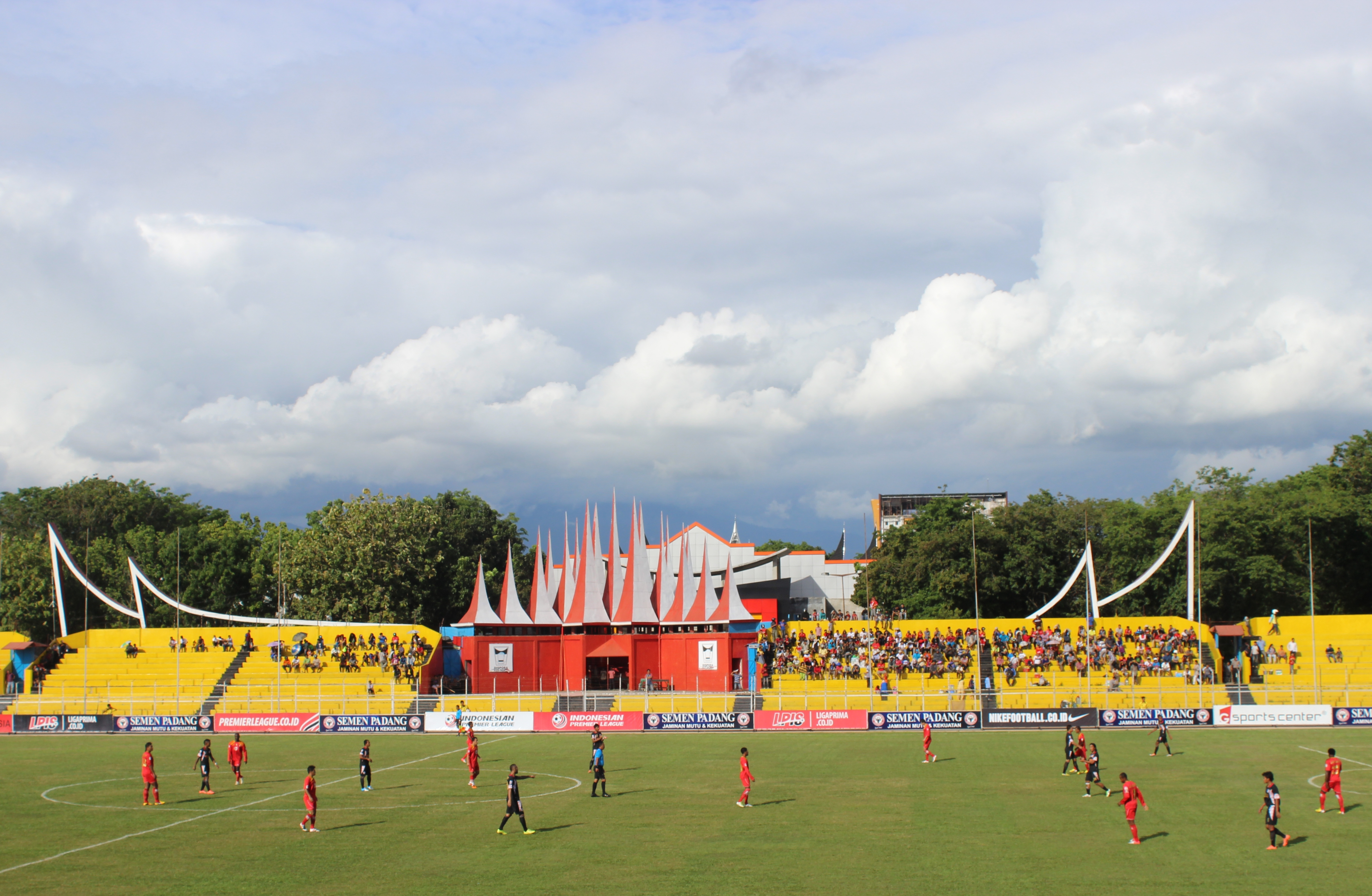
- The stadium on a matchday in 2013
- Interactive map of Gelora Haji Agus Salim Stadium
- Location: Padang, West Sumatera
- Owner: Government of Padang City
- Operator: Padang City Department of Sports
- Capacity: 11,000
- Surface: Grass
- Field size: 105 x 68 metres

Construction
- Groundbreaking: 1983 (original); 9 September 2026 (reconstruction)
- Built: 1985 (original)
- Opened: 1985 (original)
- Renovated: 2010–2012 (original); 2024 (original)
- Demolished: July 2026 (original)

Tenants
- PSP Padang (1986–present); Semen Padang (1990–present); Minangkabau FC (2010–2011); Indonesia national rugby union team

Gelora Haji Agus Salim Stadium or GHAS is a multi-use stadium in Padang, West Sumatra, Indonesia. It is currently used mostly for Football matches and is the home stadium of Semen Padang and PSP Padang. The stadium has a capacity of 11,000. The stadium is also known as a venue for rugby union matches and athletics.

== History ==
The stadium was named after Agus Salim, a Muslim intellectual and national hero of Minangkabau from the area where the stadium is located. The 2009 Sumatra earthquakes heavily damaged the stadium. The stands were destroyed and there was damage to facilities, including lighting. The dressing rooms were also damaged, and the resultant condition of the field rendered the stadium unfit for use. Repairs were completed in 2012. The renovation began again in May 2024.

== Structure and facilities ==
The stadium has 4 tribune categories for spectators, west for VIPs with single seats, east for public, south for Spartacks and north for The Kmers.

== See also ==
- List of stadiums in Indonesia
