= PSSB Bireuen =

Indonesian football club

PSSB Bireuën
- Full name: Persatuan Sepak bola Seluruh Bireuën
- Nicknames: Laskar Juang (en: Force fighters); The Sumatera Orangutan (The Andalas Orangutan)
- Founded: 1970; 56 years ago
- Ground: Cot Gapu Stadium
- Capacity: 15,000
- Owner: Askab PSSI Bireuën
- Chairman: Drs. H. Mustafa A. Glanggang
- Manager: Bachtiar Juli
- Coach: M. Yussuf Usman
- League: Liga 4
- 2021: Round of 16, (Aceh zone)
| Home colours | Away colours |

PSSB stands for Persatuan Sepak bola Seluruh Bireuen (en: Football Association of All Bireuen). PSSB Bireuen is an Indonesian football club based in Bireuën, Bireuën Regency, Aceh. They currently compete in the Liga 4.

== History ==
Although the club competed in 2007–08 Liga Indonesia Premier Division, which was the first-tier Indonesian league at that time, they competed most of the time in second-tier Indonesian league. In 2014, PSSB failed to pass verification conducted by PSSI in order to compete in Indonesian Premier League, and ever since, they have played in Liga 4, the lowest tier in Indonesian league pyramid. Their home stadium is Cot Gapu Stadium.

== Season-by-season records ==
| Season | League/Division | Tms. | Pos. | Piala Indonesia |
|---|---|---|---|---|
| 1994–95 | First Division | 16 | 4th, Second round | – |
| 1995–96 | First Division | 24 | 4th, Second round | – |
| 1996–97 | First Division | 20 | 5th, Second round | – |
| 1997–98 | First Division | season abandoned | | – |
| 1998–99 | First Division | 19 | 3rd, Group I | – |
| 1999–2000 | First Division | 21 | 3rd, West group | – |
| 2001 | First Division | 23 | 4th, West group | – |
| 2002 | First Division | 27 | 3rd, Group 4 | – |
| 2003 | First Division | 26 | 3rd, Group A | – |
| 2004 | First Division | 24 | 12th, West division | – |
| 2005 | First Division | 27 | withdrew | – |
| 2006 | First Division | 36 | 3rd, Second round | Third round |
| 2007–08 | Premier Division | 36 | 18th, West division | Second round |
| 2008–09 | Premier Division | 29 | 12th, West division | First round |
| 2009–10 | Premier Division | 33 | 8th, West division | – |
| 2010–11 | Premier Division | 39 | 12th, Group 1 | – |
| 2011–12 | Premier Division (LPIS) | 28 | 5th, Group 1 | – |
| 2013 | Premier Division (LPIS) | 21 | First round | – |
| 2014 | | | | |
2015
2016
| 2017 | Liga 3 | 32 | Eliminated in Provincial round | – |
| 2018 | | | | |
2019
2020
| 2021–22 | Liga 3 | 64 | Eliminated in Provincial round | – |
