= Persedikab Kediri =

Indonesian football club

- Full name: Persatuan Sepakbola Kediri Kabupaten
- Nicknames: Kediri Merah (Red Kediri); Bledug Kelud (The Kelud Elephant)
- Short name: PDK
- Founded: 7 November 1989; 37 years ago
- Ground: Gelora Daha Jayati Tarokan, Kediri Regency, East Java (15,000 seats); Canda Bhirawa Pare, Kediri Regency, East Java (3,000 seats)
- Chairman: Hanindhito Himawan Pramana
- Manager: Dentama Ardiratna
- Coach: Muslim Habibi
- League: Liga 4
- 2025–26: Round of 16, (East Java zone)
Home colours	Away colours

Persatuan Sepakbola Kediri Kabupaten (simply known as Persedikab) is an Indonesian football club based in Kediri Regency, East Java. They play in Liga 4 East Java.

Their home ground is Canda Bhirawa Stadium. They are funded by the Government of Kediri Regency. Formed from the fragments of the board Persik Kediri, Inter Kediri, Triple'S Kediri, Pare FC, Kediri United, this team was more used to be known by the public sphere in Indonesia compared with Persik. The supporter community is called Fire Ant Colony (F.A.C.).

== Players ==
=== Current squad ===
As of 5 December 2025

Note: Flags indicate national team as defined under FIFA eligibility rules; some limited exceptions apply. Players may hold more than one non-FIFA nationality.

No.	Pos.	Nation	Player
1	GK	IDN	Fariz Frizky E.
12	GK	IDN	Visal Muchammad A.
30	GK	IDN	Alfitra Wicaksono
2	DF	IDN	Andreawan Saputra
3	DF	IDN	Hendra Aji D.
4	DF	IDN	Rendhi Suwarno P.
5	DF	IDN	Aziiz Al Ghany
6	DF	IDN	Moch. Dhanvy K.
18	DF	IDN	Kelang Aryasuta A.
21	DF	IDN	Johan Tetuko
27	DF	IDN	Fahmi Azizi
29	DF	IDN	Martin Panji
8	MF	IDN	Galih Akbar F.

No.	Pos.	Nation	Player
10	MF	IDN	Faiza Eka K.
19	MF	IDN	Ahmad Hamzah
22	MF	IDN	Fikri Afrian M.
23	MF	IDN	Mohamad Aditya S.
24	MF	IDN	Reyhan Ridho B.
7	FW	IDN	Fahmi Arizi
16	FW	IDN	Andre Agustiar (Captain)
20	FW	IDN	Dzusifa Mughni
11	FW	IDN	Fenno Jaya
15	FW	IDN	Zakki Adi
26	FW	IDN	Nagardi Okta P.
28	FW	IDN	Rizal Prasetyo

=== Former foreign players ===
Premier Division (1996/1997)
- (Czech Republic) Heřman Kubín
- (Czech Republic) Martin Kuber
- (Czech Republic) Miloslav Brožek

== Club Officials ==
Position	Staff
Chairman	(Indonesia) Hanindhito Himawan Pramana
Team Manager	(Indonesia) Dentama Ardiratna
Head Coach	(Indonesia) Muslim Habibi
Assistant Coach	(Indonesia) Yayan Andhy Triyana
Goalkeeper Coach	(Indonesia) Achmad Fahmy Arianto
Physical Coach	(Indonesia) Farid Alfahsyada

== Season-by-season records ==
Season	League/Division	Tms.	Pos.	Piala Indonesia
1994–95	First Division	16	3rd, Second round	–
1995–96	First Division	24	2	–
1996–97	Premier Division	33	11th, East region	–
1997–98	First Division	season abandoned		–
1998–99	First Division	19	4th, Group 3	–
1999–2000	First Division	16	3rd, Second round	–
2001	First Division	23	2	–
2002	Premier Division	24	12th, East division	–
2003	First Division	26	6th, Group C	–
2004	Second Division	41	4	–
2005	First Division	27	Relegation play-off winner	First round
2006	First Division	36	9th, Group 3	First round
2007–08	First Division	40	10th, Group 3	Qualifying round
2008–09	First Division	48	5th, Group 5	–
2009–10	First Division	60	4th, Third round	–
2010	First Division	57	3rd, Group 9	–
2011–12	First Division	66	Second round	–
2013	First Division	77	First round	–
2014	Liga Nusantara			–
2015	Liga Nusantara	season abandoned		–
2016	ISC Liga Nusantara			–
2017	Liga 3	32	Eliminated in provincial round	–
2018	Liga 3	32	4th, First round	–
2019	Liga 3	32	Second round	–
2020	Liga 3	season abandoned		–
2021–22	Liga 3	64	3rd, Third round	–
2022–23	Liga 3	season abandoned		–
2023–24	Liga 3	80	3rd, Second round	–
2024–25	Liga 4	64	Eliminated in provincial round	–
2025-26	Liga 4	16	Eliminated in provincial round	

== Honours ==
=== League ===
- First Division
  - Runner-up 1996, 2001
- Liga 3 East Java
  - Runner-up: 2021, 2023

=== Tournament ===
- Trofeo Blitar
  - Winners (1): 2022

== Kit suppliers ==
Years	Kits
(1996–1997)	(Germany) Adidas
(2017)	(Indonesia) Sole Sport
(2018)	(Indonesia) Fitsee
(2019)	(Indonesia) QJ Apparel
(2021 & 2023/24)	(Indonesia) Noto Sportwear
(2022 & 2025/26)	(Indonesia) ALB Apparel
