= PSB Bogor =

Indonesian football club

- Full name: Persatuan Sepakbola Bogor
- Nicknames: Laskar Pakuan; The Ahool
- Founded: 1950; 76 years ago
- Ground: Pajajaran Stadium
- Capacity: 12,000
- Owner: Bogor City Government
- Chairman: Nasrul Zahar
- Manager: Alfie Radithya Ferdian
- Coach: Tubagus Wahyu
- League: Liga 4
- 2025–26: Second Round, 3rd in Group 2 (West Java zone Series 1)
Home colours	Away colours

Persatuan Sepakbola Bogor, commonly known as PSB Bogor, is an Indonesian football club based in Bogor, West Java. They currently compete in the Liga 4. Their home stadium is Pajajaran Stadium.

== History ==
PSB Bogor was established in 1950, they became known in the 90s. At that time, they managed to come out as runners-up 1990–91 Soeratin Cup. The following season, they again managed to qualify for the Soeratin Cup final. This time, they were against a team as strong as PSIM Yogyakarta. Learning from previous failures, they managed to come out as champions after winning with a score of 2–0. This is also the first prestigious title in the history of the club.

And for the second time, they came back as winners of the Soeratin Cup in the 1992–93 season in the West Java zone. They defeated Persikasi Bekasi with a score of 1–0, which brought them to represent West Java to play at the national level. As a result, they won the Soeratin Cup at the national level.

These consecutive wins continue to be recorded by them. In the 1993–94 Suratin Cup competition season, they came back as champions after defeating Persebaya Surabaya at the Gelora 10 November Stadium with a score of 5-4 (via penalty).

However, in the 1994–95 season, they only came out as runners up in the Soeratin Cup. at that time they were defeated by rival club Persikasi Bekasi. However, in the following year. They won the Soeratin Cup again after defeating Persis Solo. This victory also made PSB a team with five titles in the history of the Soeratin Cup.

== Players ==
=== Current squad ===
Note: Flags indicate national team as defined under FIFA eligibility rules; some limited exceptions apply. Players may hold more than one non-FIFA nationality.

No.	Pos.	Nation	Player
—	GK	IDN	Rafli Agustian
—	GK	IDN	Teguh Maulana Insan
—	GK	IDN	Candra Amin Azinta
—	DF	IDN	Deni Setiawan
—	DF	IDN	Sopi Fahmi
—	DF	IDN	Misfahulfalah
—	DF	IDN	Asep Purnama Bahri
—	DF	IDN	Dodi Kuswara
—	DF	IDN	Deni Imam
—	DF	IDN	Ahmad Sopian
—	DF	IDN	Heri Andriawan
—	DF	IDN	Dani Hermawan
—	MF	IDN	Ahmad S
—	MF	IDN	Asep Ramdani
—	MF	IDN	Rizki Lesmana
—	MF	IDN	Victor Ilhami
—	MF	IDN	I Komang Adyana
—	MF	IDN	Rony Surya
—	MF	IDN	Deby Darmawan
—	MF	IDN	Nizar Azhari Septian
—	MF	IDN	Dicky Janwar
—	MF	IDN	Buharuddin
—	MF	IDN	Yusuf Rendy Raharjo
—	FW	IDN	Anwar Hidayat
—	FW	IDN	Irvan Firdaus
—	FW	IDN	Iqbal Nugraha
—	FW	IDN	Rondi Alfera

== Season-by-season records ==
Season(s)	League/Division	Tms.	Pos.	Piala Indonesia
1994–95	Second Division		4th	–
1995–96	First Division	24	Semi-final	–
1996–97	Premier Division	33	8th, Central division	–
1997–98	Premier Division	31	did not finish	–
1998–99	Premier Division	28	Withdrew	–
1999–2000	First Division	21	3rd, Central Group 2	–
2001	First Division	23	6th, Central Group 2	–
2002	Second Division		Third round	–
2003	Second Division	28	2nd, Second round	–
2004	Second Division	28	3rd, First round	–
2005	Second Division	23	3rd, Group 2	–
2006	First Division	36	9th, Group 2	First round
2007	First Division	40	10th, Group 2	First round
2008–09	First Division	48	5th, Group 4	–
2009–10	First Division	60	Relegation play-off winner	–
2010	First Division	57	3rd, Group 5	–
2011–12	First Division	66	6th, Group 5	–
2013	First Division	77	5th, Group 5	–
2014	First Division	73	3rd, Group E	–
2015	Liga Nusantara	season abandoned		–
2016	ISC Liga Nusantara	32		–
2017	Liga 3	32	Eliminated in provincial phase	–
2018				
2019
2020
2021–22	Liga 3	64	Eliminated in provincial phase	–
2022–23	Liga 3	season abandoned		–
2023–24	Liga 3	80	Eliminated in provincial phase	–
2024–25	Liga 4	64	Eliminated in provincial phase	–

== Former players ==
- (Cameroon) Bako Sadissou
- (Indonesia) Ellie Aiboy
- (Indonesia) Imran Nahumarury
- (Indonesia) Indra Mustafa
- (Indonesia) Tugiyo
