= 2016 Indonesia Soccer Championship A =

Indonesia Soccer Championship A
- Season: 2016
- Dates: 29 April – 18 December 2016
- Champions: Persipura
- Matches: 306
- Goals: 803 (2.62 per match)
- Top goalscorer: Alberto Gonçalves (25 goals)
- Biggest home win: Madura United 7–1 Perseru (10 December 2016)
- Biggest away win: Sriwijaya 0–4 Bhayangkara (2 October 2016)
- Highest scoring: Persipura 5–4 Barito Putra (13 June 2016)
- Longest winning run: 6 matches Madura United
- Longest unbeaten run: 10 matches Madura United; PSM
- Longest winless run: 14 matches Persija
- Longest losing run: 6 matches Persela
- Highest attendance: 50,177; Persija 1–0 Semen Padang (8 May 2016)
- Lowest attendance: 0 Arema 3–0 Bhayangkara (15 May 2016); Perseru 2–0 Persipura (8 October 2016); Persija 1–0 Persiba (13 November 2016); Persija 1–1 Bhayangkara (27 November 2016); Persija 0–1 Persegres (7 December 2016)
- Total attendance: 2,334,733
- Average attendance: 7,630

Indonesia Soccer Championship A, also known as Torabika Soccer Championship presented by IM3 Ooredoo for sponsorship reasons, was a football competition that replaced the temporarily-suspended Indonesia Super League.

This football competition was considered as unofficial, but the official I-League website has added this edition as the predecessor of current Indonesia top flight league Super League.

Persipura won the title on the final matchday.

== Teams ==
Eighteen teams competed in this tournament – all teams from the abandoned 2015 Indonesia Super League.

=== Name changes ===
- Persipasi Bandung Raya were relocated to Pamekasan and renamed Madura United.
- Persiram were bought by the Indonesian National Armed Forces, and relocated to Bandung as PS TNI.
- Persebaya ISL were (after temporary name changes to Persebaya United, Bonek, and Surabaya United, following an injunction to use the name Persebaya) renamed to Bhayangkara Surabaya United (as a merger with Indonesian National Police club PS Polri). On 10 September 2016, Bhayangkara Surabaya United changed name to Bhayangkara and were relocated to Sidoarjo.

=== Stadium and locations ===
Locations of the 2016 Indonesia Soccer Championship A teams

Team	Location	Stadium	Capacity
Arema Cronus	Malang	Kanjuruhan (Note: Arema Cronus held several of their home matches at Gajayana.)	42,449
Bali United	Gianyar	Kapten I Wayan Dipta	25,000
Barito Putera	Banjarmasin	May 17th	15,000
Bhayangkara	Sidoarjo	Gelora Delta	35,000
Madura United	Bangkalan	Gelora Bangkalan (Note: Madura United held several of their home matches at Gelora Ratu Pamelingan.)	15,000
Mitra Kukar	Tenggarong	Aji Imbut	35,000
Persegres	Gresik	Petrokimia	25,000
Persela	Lamongan	Surajaya	14,000
Perseru	Serui	Marora	10,000
Persib	Bandung	Si Jalak Harupat (Note: Persib held their home matches at Gelora Bandung Lautan Api starting from week 7 because Si Jalak Harupat was renovated for 2016 Indonesian National Games (PON XIX). But they back again to Si Jalak Harupat since week 28 as 2016 Indonesian National Games (PON XIX) have ended.)	27,000
Persiba	Balikpapan	Persiba	12,500
Persija	Surakarta	Manahan (Note: Persija used Manahan as their home ground since week 12 because Gelora Bung Karno was renovated for 2018 Asian Games.)	25,000
Persipura	Jayapura	Mandala	30,000
PS TNI	Cibinong	Pakansari (Note: PS TNI held their first two home matches at Siliwangi before they moved to Pakansari.)	30,000
PSM	Makassar	Andi Mattalata	15,000
Pusamania Borneo	Samarinda	Segiri	16,000
Semen Padang	Padang	Haji Agus Salim	10,000
Sriwijaya	Palembang	Gelora Sriwijaya	36,000

=== Personnel and kits ===
Note: Flags indicate national team as has been defined under FIFA eligibility rules. Players and Managers may hold more than one non-FIFA nationality.

Team	Coach	Captain	Kit manufacturer	Front sponsor(s)
Arema Cronus	(Bosnia and Herzegovina) Milomir Seslija	(Indonesia) Hamka Hamzah	Specs	Corsa, Ijen Suites
Bali United	(Indonesia) Indra Sjafri	(Indonesia) Fadil Sausu	Made by Club	Achilles, Corsa, Datsun, Indofood
Barito Putera	(Indonesia) Yunan Helmi	(Indonesia) Aditya Harlan	Vision of Superior	Hasnur Group
Bhayangkara	(Indonesia) Ibnu Grahan	(Indonesia) Indra Kahfi	Made by Club	Bank BRI
Madura United	(Brazil) Gomes de Olivera	(Brazil) Fabiano Beltrame	MBB	JD.id, Smartfren
Mitra Kukar	(Indonesia) Jafri Sastra	(Indonesia) Bayu Pradana	Joma	PT. Petrona
Persegres	(Indonesia) Eduard Tjong	(Indonesia) Agus Indra	Creative Color	HMSS, HSS, PGN
Persela	(Indonesia) Aji Santoso	(Indonesia) Choirul Huda	DJ Sport	So Nice, Visit Lamongan
Perseru	(Indonesia) Hanafi	(Indonesia) Arhur Bonai	Junior	Bank Papua
Persib	(Indonesia) Djadjang Nurdjaman	(Indonesia) Atep Rizal	Sportama Soccer	Datsun, Indofood
Persiba	(Brazil) Jaino Matos	(Indonesia) Bima Sakti	Eureka	
Persija	(Indonesia) Zein Alhadad	(Indonesia) Bambang Pamungkas	League	Corsa
Persipura	(Argentina) Alfredo Vera	(Indonesia) Boaz Solossa	Specs	Bank Papua
PS TNI	(Indonesia) Suharto AD	(Indonesia) Legimin Raharjo	Made by Club	Mogu Mogu
PSM	(Netherlands) Robert Alberts	(Indonesia) Rizky Pellu	Nike	Semen Bosowa
Pusamania Borneo	(Montenegro) Dragan Đukanović	(Indonesia) Ponaryo Astaman	Salvo	Nahusam, Cahaya Tiara Plantation
Semen Padang	(Indonesia) Nil Maizar	(Indonesia) Hengky Ardiles	Mizuno	Semen Padang, Semen Indonesia
Sriwijaya	(Indonesia) Widodo C. Putro	(Indonesia) Supardi Nasir	Joma	Bank Sumsel Babel, Bukit Asam, PT. TEL

Additionally, referee kits are made by Joma and Nike supplied the match ball.

=== Coaching changes ===
Team	Outgoing coach	Manner of departure	Date of vacancy	Position in table	Incoming coach	Date of appointment
PSM	(Brazil) Luciano Leandro	Sacked	19 May 2016	13th	(Indonesia) Tony Ho	19 May 2016
Persela	(Sweden) Stefan Hansson	Resigned	24 May 2016	18th	(Indonesia) Didik Ludianto	28 May 2016
PSM	(Indonesia) Tony Ho	End of caretaker spell	1 June 2016	10th	(Netherlands) Robert Alberts	1 June 2016
Persela	(Indonesia) Didik Ludianto	End of caretaker spell	5 June 2016	18th	(Indonesia) Sutan Harhara	5 June 2016
Persib	(Serbia) Dejan Antonić	Resigned	11 June 2016	13th	(Indonesia) Herrie Setyawan	13 June 2016
PS TNI	(Indonesia) Eduard Tjong	Resigned	23 June 2016	17th	(Indonesia) Suharto AD	23 June 2016
Persib	(Indonesia) Herrie Setyawan	End of caretaker spell	28 June 2016	12th	(Indonesia) Djadjang Nurdjaman	28 June 2016
Mitra Kukar	(Indonesia) Subangkit	Resigned	1 August 2016	9th	(Indonesia) Jafri Sastra	2 August 2016
Persipura	(Indonesia) Jafri Sastra	Mutual Termination	1 August 2016	7th	(Argentina) Alfredo Vera	2 August 2016
Persija	(Brazil) Paulo Camargo	Resigned	1 August 2016	16th	(Indonesia) Jan Saragih	1 August 2016
Persija	(Indonesia) Jan Saragih	End of caretaker spell	31 August 2016	17th	(Indonesia) Zein Alhadad	31 August 2016
Persegres	(Indonesia) Liestiadi	Resigned	30 August 2016	16th	(Indonesia) Sasi Kirono	30 August 2016
Persela	(Indonesia) Sutan Harhara	Resigned	2 September 2016	18th	(Indonesia) Aji Santoso	7 September 2016
Barito Putera	(Indonesia) Mundari Karya	Sacked	10 October 2016	18th	(Indonesia) Yunan Helmi	10 October 2016

== Foreign players ==
Football Association of Indonesia restricted the number of foreign players to four per team, including one slot for a player from AFC countries. Teams can use all the foreign players at once.

- Players name in **bold** indicates the player was registered during the mid-season transfer window.
- Players in italics were out of squad or left club within the season, after pre-season transfer window, or in the mid-season transfer window, and at least had one appearance.

Team	Player 1	Player 2	Player 3	Asian Player	Former Player(s)
Arema Cronus	(Argentina) Esteban Vizcarra	(North Macedonia) Goran Gančev	(Brazil) Márcio Teruel	(Australia) **Nick Kalmar**	(Montenegro) Srđan Lopičić (Australia) Gustavo Marulanda
Bali United	(Serbia) Nemanja Vidaković	(Serbia) **Zoran Knežević**	(England) **Daniel Heffernan**	(South Korea) Ahn Byung-keon	(Brazil) Lucas Patinho (Spain) Kiko Insa
Barito Putera	(Brazil) Luiz Júnior	(Brazil) **Thiago Amaral**	(Cameroon) **Thierry Gathuessi**	(South Korea) **Lim Joon-sik**	(Mali) Mohammadou Al Hadji (Sierra Leone) Ibrahim Conteh
Bhayangkara	(Brazil) Otávio Dutra	(Brazil) Thiago Furtuoso	(Morocco) Khairullah Abdelkabir	(South Korea) **Lee Yoo-joon**	(Timor-Leste) Paulo Helber
Madura United	(Brazil) Fabiano Beltrame	(Liberia) Erick Weeks	(Spain) Pablo Rodriguez	(Australia) Dane Milovanović	
Mitra Kukar	(Brazil) Arthur Cunha	(Brazil) Marlon da Silva	(Spain) **Victor Herrero**		(Timor-Leste) Alan Leandro (Brazil) Rodrigo Ost (Timor-Leste) Fellipe Bertoldo
Persegres	(Brazil) Patrick da Silva	(Serbia) Saša Zečević	(Australia) **Gustavo Marulanda**	(South Korea) Oh In-kyun	(Brazil) Eduardo Maciel
Persela	(Brazil) **Hédipo Gustavo**	(Brazil) **Ivan Carlos**	(Brazil) **Paulo Eduardo**	(South Korea) **Choi Hyun-yeon**	(Guam) Shane Malcolm (Netherlands) Kristian Adelmund (Spain) José Galán (Cameroon) Herman Dzumafo (Germany) Romeo Filipović
Perseru	(Mali) Amadou Gakou	(Nigeria) **Osas Saha**	(Ivory Coast) **Boman Aimé**		(Cameroon) Henry Njobi (Ivory Coast) Siaka Dembélé
Persib	(Argentina) Robertino Pugliara	(Montenegro) Vladimir Vujović	(Argentina) **Marcos Flores**	(Australia) **Diogo Ferreira**	(Spain) Juan Belencoso
Persiba	(Brazil) Antônio Teles	(Liberia) Dirkir Glay	(Brazil) **Maycon Calijuri**	(Japan) Shohei Matsunaga	(Brazil) Vinicius Reis
Persija	(Brazil) Willian Pacheco	(Brazil) **Rodrigo Tosi**	(Cameroon) **Emmanuel Kenmogne**	(South Korea) Hong Soon-hak	(Colombia) Jose Guerra (Mali) Djibril Coulibaly
Persipura	(Brazil) **Ricardinho**	(Liberia) **Edward Wilson**		(South Korea) Yoo Jae-hoon	(Liberia) James Lomell (Liberia) Boakay Foday (Timor-Leste) Thiago Fernandes
PS TNI					
PSM	(Brazil) **Luiz Ricardo**	(Netherlands) **Wiljan Pluim**	(Netherlands) **Ronald Hikspoors**	(South Korea) **Kwon Jun**	(Ivory Coast) Boman Aimé (Ivory Coast) Lamine Diarrassouba (Brazil) Alex da Silva (Timor-Leste) Paulo Martins
Pusamania Borneo	(Brazil) Edilson Tavares	(Paraguay) Pedro Velázquez	(Brazil) **Flávio Júnior**	(Lebanon) Jad Noureddine	(Brazil) Tárik Boschetti
Semen Padang	(Brazil) Cássio	(Brazil) Marcel Sacramento	(Bosnia and Herzegovina) **Muamer Svraka**	(South Korea) **Lee Kil-hoon**	(Turkmenistan) Mekan Nasyrow (Brazil) Diego Santos
Sriwijaya	(Brazil) Alberto Gonçalves	(Brazil) Hilton Moreira	(Brazil) Mauricio Leal	(South Korea) Yoo Hyun-goo	

== League table ==
Pos	Team	Pld	W	D	L	GF	GA	GD	Pts
1	Persipura (C)	34	20	8	6	53	27	+26	68
2	Arema Cronus	34	18	10	6	46	22	+24	64
3	Madura United	34	18	7	9	56	40	+16	61
4	Sriwijaya	34	15	11	8	62	39	+23	56
5	Persib	34	15	10	9	45	33	+12	55
6	PSM	34	16	6	12	52	46	+6	54
7	Bhayangkara	34	15	9	10	50	34	+16	54
8	Semen Padang	34	15	7	12	46	34	+12	52
9	Pusamania Borneo	34	14	8	12	62	41	+21	50
10	Mitra Kukar	34	13	10	11	47	43	+4	49
11	Perseru	34	13	7	14	38	51	−13	46
12	Bali United	34	10	10	14	36	52	−16	40
13	Persiba	34	9	8	17	38	52	−14	35
14	Persija	34	8	11	15	25	42	−17	35
15	Persela	34	9	8	17	40	59	−19	35
16	Barito Putera	34	8	9	17	40	50	−10	33
17	Persegres	34	7	8	19	30	63	−33	29
18	PS TNI	34	7	5	22	37	75	−38	26

Source: Liga Indonesia, Indonesia Soccer Championship
Rules for classification: 1) Points; 2) Head-to-head goal difference; 3) Goal difference; 4) Goals scored; 5) Draw.
(C) Champions

== Results ==
Home \ Away	ARE	BLU	BPT	BHA	MDU	MKU	PGU	PSL	PSR	PSB	PBA	PSJ	PPR	TNI	PSM	PBO	SPD	SRI
Arema Cronus	—	1–0	0–0	3–0	2–1	0–0	3–1	3–0	3–0	0–0	2–0	1–0	0–0	2–1	2–0	1–2	1–0	3–2
Bali United	2–2	—	3–2	2–2	0–0	1–1	1–1	3–1	3–0	1–0	1–2	1–1	0–1	2–2	0–2	1–1	2–1	1–0
Barito Putera	0–1	0–1	—	1–2	1–0	0–1	3–1	1–0	5–1	1–1	3–1	1–0	0–0	1–0	1–2	1–0	1–1	1–1
Bhayangkara	0–1	3–1	1–1	—	0–1	4–0	1–0	3–0	3–1	4–1	1–0	2–1	1–2	0–0	0–1	2–1	2–2	0–1
Madura United	0–0	0–0 (Note: This match was held at Gelora Delta and without spectators as a part of PSSI Disciplinary Committee punishment because Madura United's supporters lit flares in their match against Persiba.)	1–0	1–1 (Note: This match was held at Gelora Delta, which was the home ground of Bhayangkara due to the election of village heads in Bangkalan.)	—	3–2	4–1	2–1	7–1	2–1	3–1	1–0	2–0	4–1	4–1	2–1	2–1	2–5
Mitra Kukar	2–1	3–1	1–1	2–3	2–1	—	2–1	1–2	1–0	2–1	0–0	2–0	1–2	3–2	2–2	3–2	2–0	1–0
Persegres	1–0	0–1	2–1	0–0	1–2	0–0	—	1–1	1–1	2–1	1–2	2–2	0–3	0–0	1–3	2–1	1–1	2–1
Persela	0–2	3–0 (Note: This match was held at Gelora Delta due to the renovation of Surajaya.)	4–2	0–1	2–1	1–0	0–1	—	2–0	2–1	1–2	1–1	0–1	3–2 (Note: This match was held at Gelora Delta due to the renovation of Surajaya.)	2–2	1–0	3–3 (Note: This match was held at Gajayana due to the renovation of Surajaya.)	3–3
Perseru	1–0	2–0	3–1	1–0	1–1	0–0	4–1	1–1	—	1–0	2–0	0–0	2–0	2–1	1–0	3–0 (Note: Perseru awarded a 3–0 walkover win against Pusamania Borneo because the away team didn't attend to match.)	2–0	0–0
Persib	0–0	2–0	2–0 (Note: This match was held at Pakansari.)	2–1 (Note: This match was held at Wibawa Mukti.)	0–0	2–1	2–0 (Note: This match was held at Wibawa Mukti.)	1–0	6–2	—	2–1 (Note: This match was held at Wibawa Mukti.)	0–0	2–0	4–0	3–2	1–0	1–0	1–1
Persiba	0–0	3–1	1–1	0–2	1–2	2–2	5–3	3–3	1–2	1–1	—	1–0	1–4	2–0	0–2	0–1	2–1	0–0
Persija	1–4 (Note: This match was held at Gajayana, which was the alternative home ground of Arema Cronus.)	1–2 (Note: This match was held at Kapten I Wayan Dipta, which was the home ground of Bali United.)	3–2	1–1	0–3 (Note: This match was held at Gelora Bangkalan, which was the home ground of Madura United.)	1–1	0–1	2–1	2–1	0–0	1–0	—	1–1	1–0	0–1	0–2	1–0	0–3 (Note: Sriwijaya awarded a 3–0 win over Persija due to the riots of supporters.)
Persipura	2–0	0–0	5–4	2–1	2–0	1–0	3–0	5–0	1–0	0–2	1–1	1–1	—	3–2	4–2	0–0	2–0	1–0
PS TNI	2–1	2–4	2–1	1–1 (Note: This match was held at Wibawa Mukti.)	1–2	1–4	2–0	3–1	1–0	0–3	0–2 (Note: This match was held at Wibawa Mukti.)	1–2	1–3	—	1–1	3–1	1–0	2–5 (Note: This match was held at Wibawa Mukti.)
PSM	0–1	4–0	1–0	1–2	1–0	2–1	3–2	2–1	1–1	2–2	3–2	0–1	0–0	4–0	—	0–2	3–2	2–1
Pusamania Borneo	2–2	4–0	4–1	1–1	1–1	3–2	5–0	3–1	6–1	0–0	1–0	3–0	0–3	6–1	4–1	—	0–0	2–2
Semen Padang	1–3	3–0	2–0	2–1	3–1	3–2	2–0	4–0	2–0	4–0	1–0	0–0	2–0	1–0	2–1	2–1	—	2–1
Sriwijaya	1–1	2–1	2–2	0–4	5–0	0–0	3–0	2–2	1–0	3–0	3–1	2–1	1–0	6–1	1–0	3–2	1–1	—

Source: Liga Indonesia, Indonesia Soccer Championship
Legend: Blue = home team win; Yellow = draw; Red = away team win.
For upcoming matches, an "a" indicates there is an article about the rivalry between the two participants.

== Top goalscorers ==
Rank	Player	Club	Goals
1	(Brazil) Alberto Gonçalves	Sriwijaya	25
2	(Brazil) Marcel Sacramento	Semen Padang	21
3	(Brazil) Luiz Júnior	Barito Putera	17
4	(Brazil) Marlon da Silva	Mitra Kukar	16
5	(Indonesia) Cristian Gonzáles	Arema Cronus	15
5	(Brazil) Thiago Furtuoso	Bhayangkara	15
7	(Spain) Pablo Rodríguez	Madura United	14
7	(Paraguay) Pedro Velázquez	Pusamania Borneo	14
9	(Japan) Shohei Matsunaga	Persiba	13
10	(Indonesia) Sergio van Dijk	Persib	12

== Attendances ==
Pos	Team	Total	High	Low	Average	Change
1	Persib	297,122	35,125	5,949	17,478	n/a
2	Persija	212,004	50,177	0	12,471	n/a
3	Arema Cronus	202,309	44,807	0	11,901	n/a
4	Persipura	201,234	21,000	2,500	11,837	n/a
5	Sriwijaya	194,539	22,500	4,270	11,443	n/a
6	Bali United	181,240	21,175	1,566	10,661	n/a
7	PSM	135,589	14,208	4,325	7,976	n/a
8	Persegres	131,335	18,417	3,143	7,726	n/a
9	Persela	122,565	13,150	935	7,210	n/a
10	Madura United	111,999	15,169	1,135	6,588	n/a
11	PS TNI	94,812	26,213	425	5,577	n/a
12	Semen Padang	89,332	11,900	1,542	5,255	n/a
13	Pusamania Borneo	83,029	16,722	1,823	4,884	n/a
14	Bhayangkara	76,826	11,015	2,143	4,519	n/a
15	Barito Putera	59,823	8,178	1,377	3,519	n/a
16	Mitra Kukar	59,231	12,371	1,036	3,484	n/a
17	Persiba	46,744	6,867	629	2,750	n/a
18	Perseru	35,000	8,407	0	2,059	n/a
	League total	2,334,733	50,177	0	7,630	n/a

Source: Torabika Soccer Championship
Notes:
There was no comparison as this competition was not counted as an official league season.

== See also ==
- 2016 Indonesia Soccer Championship B
- 2016 ISC Liga Nusantara
- 2016 Indonesia Soccer Championship U-21
- 2016 Soeratin Cup
