= Sutan Harhara =

Indonesian footballer (1952–2026)

Personal information
- Date of birth: 19 August 1952
- Place of birth: Jakarta, Indonesia
- Date of death: 11 April 2026 (aged 73)
- Place of death: South Tangerang, Indonesia
- Height: 1.74 m (5 ft 9 in)
- Position: Full-back

Youth career
- 1972–1973: Indonesia Muda Jakarta
- 1973–1980: Jayakarta

Senior career*
Years	Team	Apps	(Gls)
1972–1980	Persija Jakarta		

International career
1972–1980	Indonesia		

Managerial career
- 2003–2005: PSMS Medan
- 2016: Persela Lamongan
- * Club domestic league appearances and goals

Sutan Harhara (19 August 1952 – 11 April 2026) was an Indonesian footballer who played as a full-back for Persija Jakarta and the Indonesia national team in the 1970s, in the wing-back position.

== Club career ==
=== Persija Jakarta ===
Sutan began to play for Persija Jakarta in 1971 at age 19. In his first year for Persija, he aided the team in becoming champion of the 1971 Perserikatan. He also helped the team to a joint-championship with PSMS Medan in the 1975 Perserikatan after a 1–1 draw in the final game. Unfortunately, the final was abandoned in the 40th minute by the head referee due to unruly conduct from players.

Persija Jakarta was often overshadowed during this period by PSMS Medan, who were considered the best team in Indonesia after winning three straight perserikatan from 1966 to 1969. However, Persija still boasted many Timnas stars, including Anwar Udjang, Nobon Kayamudin, Risdianto, Iswadi Idris, Subodro, Andi Lala, Anjas Asmara and Andjiek Ali Nurdin.

Sutan also was noted for performances against a number of foreign clubs. During a 1974 visit of Ajax Amsterdam to Indonesia, Sutan successfully defended against Ajax star Gerth van Zanten. "Initially I was on the left. Because of the difficulty he had playing against me, he became frustrated and moved over to the right," stated Sutan. Sutan also featured in games against Manchester United, Rapid Vienna, and Rosario Central.

== International career ==
=== Debut against Uruguay (1974) ===
Sutan was called up in the Indonesia national team to face Uruguay on 19 April 1974 in a friendly match in Istora Senayan Stadium (now Istora Gelora Bung Karno), Jakarta. Uruguay was preparing for the 1974 FIFA World Cup, which began in June 1974. As the match was a friendly, Uruguay did not involve many core players, and as a result they were defeated 2–1. In order to avoid embarrassment, Uruguay requested a rematch, to take place two days later, on 21 April. This time, Uruguay emerged as the winner, with a score of 3–2. Sutan featured in both games. He was noted for his success in facing Fernando Morena and Juan Silva.

=== Indonesia vs Manchester United (1975) ===
As part of newly appointed Timnas coach Wiel Coerver's hope of qualifying for the 1978 FIFA World Cup, Indonesia arranged to play a friendly tournament against Ajax and Manchester United as a warm-up for the 1976 Olympics qualifying match against North Korea.

Manchester United only brought 14 people to Jakarta for the game, including 12 players, a coach and a manager. They also failed to bring many of their star players, in contradiction to what had been promised to the PSSI. Manchester United seemed not to be taking the game seriously, and manager Tommy Docherty even entered the match as a player in the 2nd half, receiving a yellow card within five minutes. The game, watched by 70,000 spectators, ended in a 0–0 draw, with Indonesian goalkeeper Ronny Pasla rarely threatened by the United attack. Sutan featured in the game.

Manchester United was defeated 3–2 by Ajax two days later. Ajax was then confirmed as champion of the tournament with a 4–1 victory against Indonesia.

=== SEA Games 1977 ===
For the first time, Indonesia participated in the 1977 edition of the Southeast Asian Games, held in Kuala Lumpur, Malaysia. Indonesia with Sutan was considered the favorite for the tournament. They were placed in Group A with Malaysia, the Philippines, and Brunei, winning the group with two victories and one draw.

The semifinal game against Thailand was abandoned in the 60th minute with the score at 1–1. The referee stopped the game due to unsportsmanlike behavior from Indonesia, awarding Thailand the win and thus a berth in the final.

Indonesia were supposed to face Burma in the third-place game. However, after the Indonesian team failed to appear at the required reporting time, the referee canceled the match and awarded Burma the third-place medal.

=== SEA Games 1979 ===
In Sutan's second Southeast Asian Games tournament appearance, he helped the team to the final after a 3–1 victory against Thailand on penalty kicks in the semifinal. In the final, Indonesia faced Malaysia. The final was a fierce affair. Finally, in the 21st minute, Malaysia broke through with a goal from Mokhtar Dahari. It was the only goal of the game, and Malaysia was crowned champion of the tournament.

Ever since this game, Malaysia has been considered Indonesia's sworn enemy in football. The two teams often meet in the AFF tournament.

== Managerial career ==
=== PSMS Medan ===
Sutan was head coach of PSMS Medan from 2003 to 2005. Sutan was noted for his success in coaching players who were then called up for the national team squad, such as Mahyadi Panggabean, Saktiawan Sinaga, Markus Horison and Legimin Rahardjo.

=== Persela Lamongan ===
Sutan became head coach of Indonesia Soccer Championship A club Persela Lamongan in 2016. He was replaced by Aji Santoso later that year.

== Death ==
Sutan died at South Tangerang, on 11 April 2026, at the age of 73.

== Honours ==
Persija Jakarta

- Soeratin Cup: 1972
- Perserikatan: 1973, 1975
