= Ángel Alfredo Vera =

Argentine footballer and coach

Personal information
- Full name: Ángel Alfredo Vera
- Date of birth: 18 August 1972 (age 54)
- Place of birth: Argentina
- Height: 1.80 m (5 ft 11 in)
- Position: Defender

Senior career*
Years	Team	Apps	(Gls)
1996–1997	Leandro N. Alem		
1997–1999	Minervén		
1999–2000	Olmedo		
2000–2001	Aucas		
2001	Liga de Quito		
2001–2002	Macará		
2002–2003	Delfin		
2005–2007	Persekabpas Pasuruan		
2007–2008	PSAP Sigli		
2008–2009	PSS Sleman		
2009–2010	PSDS Deli Serdang		

Managerial career
- 2013–2014: Persela Lamongan
- 2014: Gresik United
- 2016: Borneo U21
- 2016–2017: Persipura Jayapura
- 2017–2018: Persebaya Surabaya
- 2018: Sriwijaya
- 2019: Bhayangkara
- 2020–2021: Persiba Balikpapan
- 2021–2022: Persipura Jayapura
- 2022–2023: Persita Tangerang
- 2023: Kelantan
- 2024: RANS Nusantara
- 2025: Madura United
- 2026: PSIS Semarang (Technical Director)
- * Club domestic league appearances and goals

Ángel Alfredo Vera (born 18 August 1972) is an Argentinean professional football coach and former player.

== Playing career ==
As a player, he plied his trade as a defender in his homeland of Argentina, Venezuela, Ecuador, and most recently Indonesia.

== Managerial career ==
Alfredo holds an Argentine Football Association 'A' Level Coaching License. However, his license was questioned by the Football Association of Indonesia as rules prescribe that a coach of a highest-division club must have a license equal to an AFC 'A' License. In response, he exemplified that the Malaysian Football Association did not question fellow Argentinean Mario Gómez who was in charge of Johor Darul Ta'zim in 2016. In the end, he was dismissed from the five-time champions of the Indonesian top division due to this.

Afterwards, Alfredo was announced as the new head coach of Persebaya Surabaya in mid season (after Iwan Setiawan was fired) with the aim to get them promoted to the Liga 1 just like he did with Persipura Jayapura. His achievements with Persipura, and his mid-season appointment as coach of Persebaya made him be known as'a mid-season coaching specialist'.

Just in the 14th week of the 2016 Indonesia Soccer Championship A, Alfredo replaced Jafri Sastra as head coach of Persipura Jayapura he would be the one responsible of reviving the team following their run of results under Jafri Sastra. Initially, he was considered 'not worthy' of coaching such a team. His first fixture as manager for the club was an encounter versus Bhayangkara in which he took Persipura Jayapura to a 2–1 triumph. Following the win, he took them to two successive victories in a row facing Mitra Kukar and Persegres Gresik. By the end of the season, his team had suffered only two defeats in 21 outings compared to four losses in 14 games under Jafri Sastra. Also, he steered them to fifteen victories and four draws whereby they won the league. Because of this, his appointment was regarded as a success. His success is ascribable to his ability to communicate with players and his talent at seeing potential players; he used a 4-3-3 formation which relied on two young wingers, Osvaldo Haay and Ferinando Pahabol.

At the start of the 2017 season, the former defender decided not to buy a marquee player for Persipura Jayapura as he claimed they did not require one to boost the team's performance.

On 25 March 2024, Alfredo was appointed as RANS Nusantara new head coach.

== Managerial statistics ==
As of 10 November 2025

Managerial record by team and tenure
Team	Nat.	From	To	Record					Ref.
Team	Nat.	From	To	G	W	D	L	Win %	Ref.
Persela Lamongan	(Indonesia)	23 May 2013	30 September 2013	14	4	6	4	28.57	
Gresik United	(Indonesia)	22 April 2014	31 December 2014	14	3	6	5	21.43	
Persipura Jayapura	(Indonesia)	2 August 2016	17 April 2017	22	15	5	2	68.18	
Persebaya Surabaya	(Indonesia)	27 May 2017	2 August 2018	40	19	13	8	47.50	
Sriwijaya	(Indonesia)	21 October 2018	31 December 2018	8	3	0	5	37.50	
Bhayangkara	(Indonesia)	5 February 2019	14 August 2019	21	9	6	6	42.86	
Persiba Balikpapan	(Indonesia)	1 January 2020	31 October 2021	5	2	1	2	40.00	
Persipura Jayapura	(Indonesia)	21 November 2021	1 April 2022	22	9	7	6	40.91	
Persita Tangerang	(Indonesia)	19 April 2022	22 February 2023	28	11	5	12	39.29	
Kelantan	(Malaysia)	20 June 2023	31 December 2023	16	1	1	14	6.25	
RANS Nusantara	(Indonesia)	24 March 2024	30 June 2024	5	0	1	4	0.00	
Madura United	(Indonesia)	21 January 2025	10 November 2025	30	11	9	10	36.67	
Career Total				245	107	60	78	43.67	

== Honours ==
=== Player ===
C.D. Olmedo

- Serie A: 2000

LDU Quito

- Serie B: 2001

=== Manager ===
Persipura Jayapura

- Indonesia Soccer Championship A: 2016

Persebaya Surabaya

- Liga 2: 2017
