= Persija Jakarta =

Association football team in Indonesia

- Full name: Persatuan Sepakbola Indonesia Jakarta
- Nicknames: Macan Kemayoran (Kemayoran Tigers)
- Short name: PSJ
- Founded: 28 November 1928; 97 years ago, as Voetbalbond Boemipoetera (V.B.B.); 30 June 1929; 97 years ago, as Voetbal Indonesia Jacatra (V.I.J.); May 1942; 84 years ago, as Persidja
- Ground: Gelora Bung Karno Stadium; Jakarta International Stadium
- Capacity: 77,193; 82,000
- Owner: PT Persija Jaya Jakarta
- Director: Mohamad Prapanca
- Head coach: Shin Tae-yong
- League: BRI Super League
- 2025–26: Super League, 3rd of 18
- Website: persija.id
Home colours	Away colours	Third colours

Persatuan Sepakbola Indonesia Jakarta (lit. 'Indonesian Football Association of Jakarta'), abbreviated as Persija (Indonesian pronunciation: [pərsidʒa]), is an Indonesian professional football club based in the Indonesian capital city of Jakarta. The club currently competes in the Indonesia Super League, the top tier of Indonesian football.

Persija Jakarta is the most successful football clubs in Indonesia with 2 Indonesian League titles and 9 Perserikatan titles. It has never been relegated or played in the lower league division since a nationwide competition started in 1930. Persija is one of the founders of the Indonesian football association alongside with six other clubs.

Persija's rivalry with fellow PSSI founder Persib Bandung, referred to as the Indonesian El Clásico or Derbi Indonesia, has gone on for decades, occasionally marred by violence.

== History ==
=== Foundation and early years (1928–1937) ===
Persija traces its origins to Voetbalbond Indonesia Jacatra (VIJ), which was founded on 28 November 1928 as a football club for Indonesian residents of Jakarta during the period of Dutch colonial rule. The name Jacatra refers to a historical fort on the northern coast of present-day Jakarta. On 19 April 1930, VIJ joined six other Indonesian clubs in establishing the Football Association of Indonesia (PSSI). The club won the first PSSI-sanctioned competition in 1931. Although VIJ did not participate in the competition in 1937, it subsequently became a regular participant in the top division.

=== Post-independence (1950–1951) ===
VIJ changed its name to Persija Jakarta in 1950, five years after the Indonesian independence. In mid-1951, a club with ethnic Chinese, Dutch and Eurasian players merged with the rebranded outfit. As the Indonesia national football team in the 1950s heavily depended on Persija players, its line-ups at that time were filled by many ethnic Chinese, Dutch and Eurasian players from the Jakarta club.

=== Amateur years (1951–1994) ===
After the 1945 independence, national football competitions in Indonesia centred on region-based associations of amateur clubs that received funding from the state. These associations, including Persija, played against each other in an annual tournament known as Perserikatan, which literally means union. Almost all of these associations were seen as representatives of the main ethnic group in their respective regions, flaming primordial sentiments. Multicultural Persija was the exception. Persija won six national titles in the Perserikatan years. However, its fanbase was small and less passionate compared to ethnic-based supporter groups of Persib Bandung, Persebaya Surabaya, PSM Makassar or PSMS Medan. As the Perserikatan games became popular and televised from the 1980s, the other clubs proved to be more dominant with their stronger band of supporters.

=== Semi-professional years (1994–2008) ===
Following the merger of the amateur Perserikatan and semi-professional Galatama leagues by the Football Association of Indonesia (PSSI) in 1994, Persija Jakarta entered the inaugural 1994–95 Liga Indonesia Premier Division. The transition proved difficult for the capital city club, which lacked the modernized corporate structure and large, consolidated fan bases enjoyed by regional rivals like Persib Bandung or Persebaya Surabaya. Consequently, during the first three seasons of the unified league, Persija consistently finished in the mid-table of the West Division, failing to qualify for the championship knockout stages.

The club's trajectory shifted decisively in late 1997 following the appointment of Sutiyoso as the Governor of Jakarta, who took an active role as the club's chief patron. Seeking to revitalize football in the capital, Sutiyoso initiated a comprehensive administrative and visual overhaul. He changed the club's primary kit color from its historical red and white to orange to forge a distinct identity built around the team's Macan Kemayoran (Kemayoran Tigers) moniker. Administratively, the club received increased financial backing and appointed Diza Rasyid Ali as team manager to aggressively recruit elite Indonesian national team players, while simultaneously establishing the official supporter group, The Jakmania, on 19 December 1997 to organize the city's fragmented football fans.

These institutional reforms rapidly translated into competitive success on the pitch. Under the tactical guidance of head coach Sofyan Hadi, Persija emerged as the dominant team during the 2001 Liga Indonesia Premier Division. After topping the West Division in the regular season, the club advanced to the final at the Gelora Bung Karno Stadium on 7 October 2001. Playing before a capacity crowd of approximately 60,000 spectators, Persija secured its first national league title of the unified era by defeating defending champions PSM Makassar 3–2, driven by an early goal from Imran Nahumarury and a decisive brace from striker Bambang Pamungkas.

Following the 2001 championship, Persija remained a perennial title contender throughout the mid-2000s, heavily supported by municipal backing. The club consistently reached the late knockout rounds of the domestic league and finished as runners-up in both the 2005 Liga Indonesia Premier Division, where they fell to Persipura Jayapura, and the 2005 Copa Indonesia. This sustained period of semi-professional competitiveness concluded in 2008 when PSSI overhauled the national football pyramid to comply with Asian Football Confederation professional standards, officially transitioning the top flight into the fully professional Indonesia Super League.

=== Transition to professional football (2008–2017) ===
The restructuring of the national football pyramid by the PSSI in 2008 marked Persija Jakarta's transition into the fully professional era, beginning with the inaugural 2008–09 Indonesia Super League (ISL) season. The initial years of this professional transition were characterized by financial volatility and political decoupling, as the government banned the use of regional government budgets (APBD) to fund professional clubs. Persija struggled to maintain its elite status under these new financial restrictions, enduring a title drought for over a decade. The club experienced significant administrative upheaval, frequent coaching changes, and temporary relocations away from Jakarta due to stadium availability and security challenges, which hindered their consistency despite maintaining a strong, loyal fanbase through The Jakmania.

Persija gradually improved its league performances during the following seasons. In 2017, the club finished fourth in Liga 1, securing qualification for the following year's 2018 AFC Cup. The team also developed a stronger squad under Brazilian head coach Stefano Cugurra, laying the groundwork for a successful 2018 campaign. Support from The Jakmania remained a significant part of the club's identity, with Persija regularly attracting large crowds to its home matches

=== Domestic success and continental competition (2018) ===

2018 Liga 1 winning team

The club's fortunes shifted significantly following corporate stabilization in the late 2010s, culminating in a historic 2018 season under the tactical guidance of Brazilian head coach Stefano Cugurra. Persija achieved a historic domestic treble by winning the 2018 Indonesia President's Cup pre-season tournament, the Boost Sports Super Fix Cup in Malaysia, and ultimately the 2018 Liga 1 title. The league championship was secured on 9 December 2018 after a dramatic 2–1 victory over Mitra Kukar at the Gelora Bung Karno Stadium, ending a 17-year national league title drought. This successful campaign was spearheaded by prolific Croatian striker Marko Šimić, veteran midfielder Riko Simanjuntak, and long-serving club icons Ismed Sofyan and goalkeeper Andritany Ardhiyasa.

==== AFC Cup debut ====
Persija began its 2018 AFC Cup campaign in Group H alongside Malaysian club Johor Darul Ta'zim, Vietnamese club Sông Lam Nghệ An and Singaporean club Tampines Rovers. After losing 3–0 away to Johor Darul Ta'zim in their opening match, the club recovered with a 4–1 victory over Tampines Rovers, in which Croatian striker Marko Šimić scored a hat-trick. Persija continued with a goalless draw against Sông Lam Nghệ An before recording a 1–0 victory over the Vietnamese side and a 4–0 win against Johor Darul Ta'zim. The team secured first place in the group with a 4–2 away victory over Tampines Rovers on 24 April, finishing with 13 points from six matches and advancing to the ASEAN Zonal semi-finals. In the semi-finals, Persija faced Singaporean club Home United. The first leg, played at Jalan Besar Stadium on 8 May, ended in a 3–2 defeat despite two goals from Ramdani Lestaluhu. In the return leg at Gelora Bung Karno Stadium on 15 May, Persija took an early lead through a Marko Šimić penalty, but Home United scored three goals to win 3–1 and progress 6–3 on aggregate. The match attracted 62,198 spectators, setting a record for attendance at an AFC Cup match at the time. Persija's campaign therefore ended in the ASEAN Zonal semi-finals, despite topping their group and recording several convincing victories during the group stage

Persija Jakarta victory parade after winning the 2018 Liga 1 title.

=== Post-title period and domestic cup success (2019–2023) ===
Following their 2018 triumph, Persija consolidated its position as a modern, professionally run club. They achieved continental representation in the AFC Cup and won the 2021 Menpora Cup during the domestic restart following the COVID-19 pandemic suspensions. The club continued to invest in world-class infrastructure and top-tier technical staff, notably hiring former Borussia Dortmund manager Thomas Doll in 2022, which led to a runners-up finish in the 2022–23 Liga 1 season, conceding 27 goals over the campaign. However, Persija finished eighth in the following 2023–24 season, and Doll and the club mutually agreed to part ways before the 2024–25 campaign.

=== Recent seasons (2024–present) ===
In the 2024–25 season, Persija appointed Spanish head coach Carlos Peña on a one-year contract. However, after 30 league matches, the club and Peña agreed to end their partnership on 1 May 2025. Assistant arrangements were changed for the remainder of the season, with Ricky Nelson appointed caretaker head coach. Persija ultimately finished seventh in the league.

In the 2025–26 season, Persija competed under Brazilian head coach Maurício Souza and finished third in the league with 71 points from 22 wins, five draws and seven defeats. The team scored 65 goals and conceded 29, recording one of its strongest league campaigns in recent years, although it did not secure the championship. Following the end of the season, the club decided not to extend Souza's contract.

On 8 June 2026, Persija appointed former Indonesia national team coach Shin Tae-yong as head coach on a three-year contract for the 2026–27 season. The appointment marked the beginning of a new phase for the club as it sought to build on its recent league performances and challenge for further honours. Persija continues to play its home matches at venues including Jakarta International Stadium and Gelora Bung Karno Stadium, while The Jakmania remains central to its matchday support.

== Grounds ==
Persija Jakarta training ground

Persija has used several stadiums throughout its history, reflecting changes in Jakarta's football infrastructure and the availability of suitable venues. During its early years as Voetbalbond Indonesia Jacatra (VIJ), the club played at VIJ Stadium in Petojo, Gambir, which served as an important venue for football in the city. After the club was renamed Persija in 1950, it played its home matches at Menteng Stadium, also known as Stadion Persija. The ground became closely associated with the club's early domestic success, hosting matches during several of its Perserikatan championship-winning campaigns. However, the stadium was demolished in 2006 and the site was subsequently converted into a public park. Persija later used Lebak Bulus Stadium as another home venue. The stadium was eventually demolished to make way for infrastructure development associated with Jakarta's mass rapid transit system, forcing the club to rely more heavily on alternative grounds. Before settling at the Gelora Bung Karno Stadium, the club used smaller stadiums as their home ground, including Menteng Stadium and Lebak Bulus Stadium until 2007. When Gelora Bung Karno Stadium and Jakarta International Stadium have been unavailable due to reasons such as maintenance, renovation, other events, or security concerns, Persija has also had to relocate to other stadiums near Jakarta like Patriot Chandrabhaga Stadium in Bekasi. Furthermore, Persija occasionally had to play in stadiums far from Jakarta, such as Manahan Stadium in Surakarta or Kapten I Wayan Dipta Stadium in Gianyar.

=== Gelora Bung Karno Stadium ===
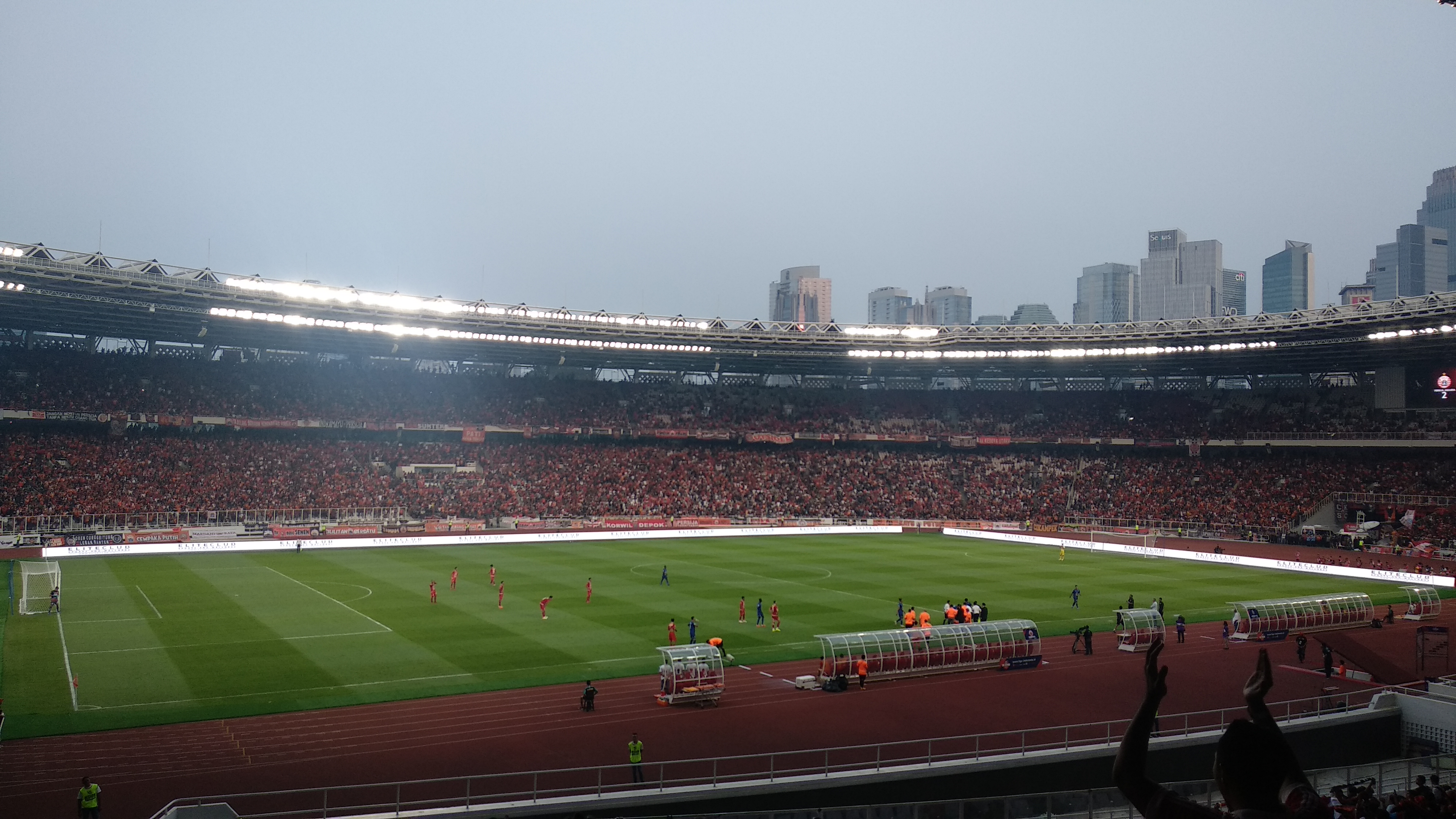
Gelora Bung Karno Stadium

Persija has frequently used Gelora Bung Karno Stadium, located in Central Jakarta, for major home fixtures. The stadium is also the principal venue for the Indonesia national football team which has a seating capacity of 77,193. Its large capacity allows Persija to accommodate substantial crowds, particularly for important league matches and fixtures involving major rivals. The club's use of the Gelora Bung Karno Stadium has nevertheless depended on the stadium's availability, as it also hosts international football matches, national events and other major occasions. When the ground has been unavailable because of events, maintenance or renovation.

=== Jakarta International Stadium ===
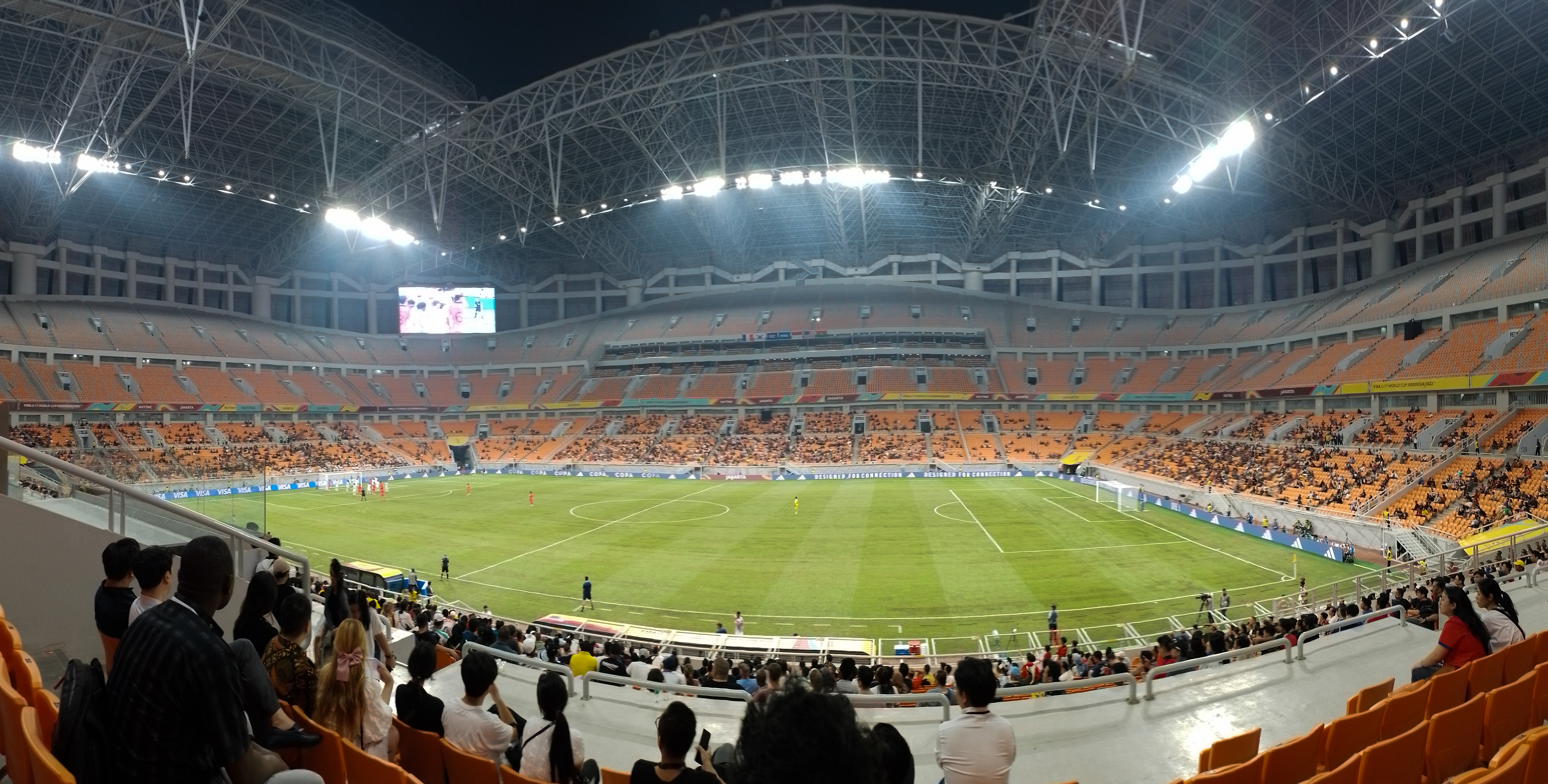
Jakarta International Stadium

In 2019, the Jakarta provincial government under governor Anies Baswedan advanced plans for a new stadium in North Jakarta, known as Jakarta International Stadium. Completed in 2022, the stadium which can accommodate up to 82,000 spectators and was designed as a modern, multipurpose venue with access to public transportation. Its development was significant for Persija, which had long relied on existing stadiums around Jakarta and neighbouring cities. The stadium was also associated with proposals to honour Mohammad Husni Thamrin, a Jakarta-born national figure who supported the development of Indonesian football and contributed funds towards the construction of VIJ's early football ground.

On 20 February 2025, Persija and the stadium's operator, PT Jakarta Propertindo (Jakpro), formally designated the stadium as the club's home through a memorandum of understanding. The agreement established a framework for using the stadium for Persija's home matches and developing its identity as a centre for the club and its supporters, The Jakmania. Although Persija continues to use Gelora Bung Karno Stadium for selected fixtures, JIS has become an important part of its home-ground arrangements. The two stadiums provide the club with alternative venues in Jakarta, allowing it to accommodate different scheduling requirements while maintaining a strong connection with its local supporters.

== Supports ==
Persija supporters celebrating club's 2018 Liga 1 league title victory.

=== Supporters ===
Persija's main supporter group is called the Jakmania or simply the Jak. Founded in 1997 by Gugun Gondrong and Ferry Indra Sjarif, the Jakmania is one of the biggest football fan groups in Indonesia and uses orange as their main colour.

The anthem of Persija, Persija Menyatukan Kita Semua, written by the Jakmania, is always sung after the match.

Persija is undeniably one of Indonesia's leading clubs with a fanbase that is now considered as the biggest in Asia, according to a December 2020 survey by the Asian Football Confederation. Before the COVID-19 pandemic, Persija games could easily gather more than 50,000 people inside the stadium with thousands watching on public screens in neighbourhoods across the sprawling capital. Persija holds the record for highest attendance in an AFC Cup match when it faced with Johor Darul Ta'zim in 2018.

=== Rivalries ===
Persija typically has rivalries with former Perserikatan teams such as PSM Makassar, Persebaya Surabaya and PSMS Medan due to long history of meetings. However, its top rival are Persib Bandung from the West Java city of Bandung, 180 km away. This derby is known as Duel Klasik or Laga Klasik. The rivalry between the two teams has become violent in the 2000s due to the growth of ultras on each side. Influenced by mass media and individuals who want the rivalry to be preserved, many hostile incidents involving the teams' supporter groups have occurred with seven deaths so far. Most notable was that of the Jakmania's Haringga Sirla, who was beaten to death by a group of Vikings, supporters of Persib, at Gelora Bandung Lautan Api Stadium in September 2018.

In 2014, a reconciliation was held by the West Java Police to avoid future clashes, resulting in restrictions against travelling supporters. However, fans continue to break the rule and end up in violent altercations.

Persija also has rivalries with other Jakarta-based football clubs, dubbed Derby Ibukota (the Capital Derby) or Jakarta Derby. However, unlike its rivalries with former Perserikatan teams, Persija's rivalries with other Jakarta-based clubs are low in intensity due to fewer matches held against them. The only rivalry worth mentioning between Persija and said clubs is with Persitara Jakarta Utara.

== Youth development ==
Persija Jakarta has several youth development programs managed by Persija Development, such as the Persija Elite Pro Academy, Persija Soccer School, and Persija Boarding School. The Elite Pro Academy is divided into the U-20, U-18, and U-16 teams, which compete in the EPA ONE. In the 2025–26 season, the Persija Jakarta U21 team won the tournament and became champions, while the Persija Jakarta U-18 team finished as runners-up. In that season, Persija Jakarta also honored as the Best Academy.

== Kit suppliers ==
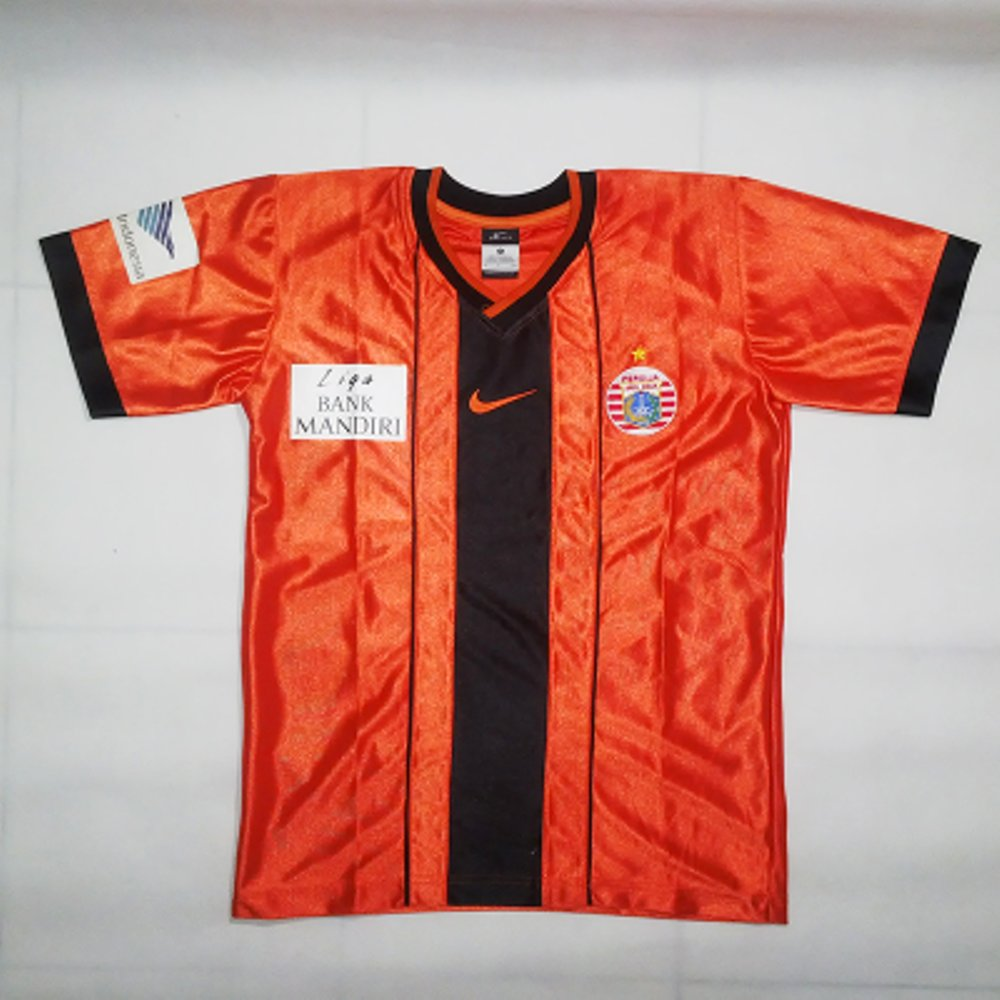
Orange Persija home jersey, used in the 2000 season

Persija Jakarta's traditional colour is red, which is used for their home kit. Jakarta Governor Sutiyoso in 1997 replaced it with orange to make it in line with the tiger symbol during the rebranding of the club. After 19 years, in 2016, Persija decided to return to red after a long national title drought. The experiment worked as Persija championed the top-tier league in 2018. Frequently, the colour of their away jersey is white. But sometimes, players wear black in their away matches. Orange has been kept as the color of their third jersey.

Period	Kit Manufacturer
1970s–1990s	(Germany) Adidas
1998–2000	(United States) Reebok
2000–2003	(England) Nike
2004–2007	(Indonesia) Specs
2007–2009	(Italy) Diadora
2009–2017	(Indonesia) League
2018–2019	(Indonesia) Specs
2020–2025	(Indonesia) Juaraga
2026–2031	(Germany) Adidas

== Affiliated clubs ==
In Indonesia’s football ecosystem, several teams are affiliated with Persija Jakarta.

=== Persija Muda ===
Persija Jakarta also has an affiliated club named Persija Muda, which is operated by Persija Foundation, an organization that manages Persija Jakarta’s internal clubs in modern times. During the Perserikatan era, every traditional clubs in Indonesia like Persija Jakarta, Persebaya Surabaya, and Persib Bandung were formed by several amateur clubs in their region. For example, Persija Jakarta had around 30 internal clubs from various areas in Jakarta, such as PS Menteng Yunior, PS Jayakarta, PS Mahasiswa, and Trisakti, which later united under the name of Persija Jakarta to represent the Jakarta region in national competitions. Today, Persija Muda plays in the fourth tier of the Indonesia football competition. Most players of Persija Muda come from Persija Jakarta’s internal clubs.

=== Persija Women ===
Persija Jakarta also has a women's team that competes in the Indonesia Women's League.

== Players ==
=== Current squad ===
As of 1 October 2026

Note: Flags indicate national team as defined under FIFA eligibility rules; some limited exceptions apply. Players may hold more than one non-FIFA nationality.

No.	Pos.	Nation	Player
1	GK	IDN	Aqil Savik
2	DF	IDN	Rio Fahmi
5	DF	IDN	Rizky Ridho (captain)
6	DF	SRB	Radovan Pankov (vice-captain)
7	MF	IDN	Victor Dethan
8	MF	IDN	Witan Sulaeman
9	FW	SWE	Alexander Jeremejeff
10	MF	IDN	Marselino Ferdinan
11	FW	IDN	Arlyansyah Abdulmanan
13	MF	KOR	Kwon Chang-hoon
17	FW	CRO	Ivan Mamut
18	DF	IDN	Pratama Arhan
19	FW	IDN	Agi Firmansyah
21	DF	IDN	Jordi Amat (3rd captain)
22	GK	IDN	Hafizh Rizkianur
23	GK	IDN	Nadeo Argawinata

No.	Pos.	Nation	Player
24	DF	IDN	Farhan Sopiulloh
25	DF	IDN	Shayne Pattynama
26	GK	IDN	Andritany Ardhiyasa
27	MF	IDN	Nathan Fariel
30	DF	CRO	Denis Kolinger
33	MF	BIH	Stjepan Lončar
44	MF	JPN	Kyohei Yoshino
47	MF	IDN	Figo Dennis
50	DF	BIH	Kerim Memija
56	DF	IDN	Fajar Fathur Rahman
58	MF	IDN	Rayhan Hannan
59	DF	IDN	Dia Syayid
77	DF	IDN	Dony Tri Pamungkas
97	MF	BRA	Fábio Calonego
98	FW	IDN	Eksel Runtukahu

=== Out on loan ===
The following is a list of players who remain part of Persija Jakarta first team in the 2026–2027 season, but currently on loan at other clubs.

Note: Flags indicate national team as defined under FIFA eligibility rules; some limited exceptions apply. Players may hold more than one non-FIFA nationality.

No.	Pos.	Nation	Player
—	GK	IDN	Cyrus Margono (at Java United)
—	FW	IDN	Mauro Zijlstra (at Arema)
15	MF	BRA	Van Basty Sousa (at Borneo Samarinda)
70	FW	BRA	Gustavo (at Java United)

=== Retired numbers ===
- 12 – The 12th man, reserved for club supporters The Jakmania.
- 14 – Ismed Sofyan
- 20 – Bambang Pamungkas

== Coaches and staffs ==
The following is a list of coaches and staffs of Persija Jakarta's first team for the 2026–27 season.

Position	Name
Head coach	(South Korea) Shin Tae-yong
Team manager	(Indonesia) Ardhi Tjahjoko
Head of scouting	(South Korea) Kim Dong-ki
Assistant coach	(South Korea) Cho Byung-kuk
Assistant coach	(South Korea) Choi In-chul
Assistant coach	(Indonesia) Maman Abdurahman
Assistant coach	(Indonesia) Taji Prashetio
Assistant coach	(Indonesia) Francis Wewengkang
Goalkeeping coach	(South Korea) Yoo Jae-hoon
Physical coach	(South Korea) Huh Ji-sub
Physical coach	(South Korea) Hwang Ji-hwan
Analyst	(South Korea) Kim Jong-jin
Analyst	(Indonesia) Muhammad Fayyadh
Interpreter	(South Korea) Jeong Seok-seo
Team secretary	(Indonesia) Regi Hariansyah
Team doctor	(Indonesia) Muhammad Adeansah
Team doctor	(Indonesia) Paruhum Rico Yohanes
Physiotherapist	(Indonesia) Jeremia Halomoan
Physiotherapist	(Indonesia) Gusdiartomo
Masseur	(Indonesia) Aditya Julistiawan
Kitman	(Indonesia) Candra Darmawan
Kitman	(Indonesia) Aries Tri Kurniawan
Media officer	(Indonesia) Kukuh Wahyudi
Photographer	(Indonesia) Khairul Imam
Videographer	(Indonesia) Faizal Maulana Akbar

== Management ==
The following is a list of individuals in the management of PT Persija Jaya Jakarta, the company that owns Persija Jakarta.

Position	Name
President commissioner	(Indonesia) Sharif Cicip Sutardjo
Commisioner	(Indonesia) Bambang Irawan Hendradi
Commisioner	(Indonesia) Budiman Dalimunte
Commisioner	(Indonesia) Ambono Januarianto
Director	(Indonesia) Mohamad Prapanca
Sports director	(Indonesia) Bambang Pamungkas
Finance director	(Indonesia) Kokoh Afiat
Marketing director	(Indonesia) Agus Julianto
Fans engagement manager	(Indonesia) Tauhid Ferry Indrasjarief
HR & GA manager	(Indonesia) Tazkia Edelia Sumedi
Accounting & reporting manager	(Indonesia) Rizki Putri Nurdiati
Media manager	(Indonesia) Yudhistira Achmad Nugroho
Head of LOC	(Indonesia) Albinus Laurent

== Club captains ==
The following is a list of Persija Jakarta captains in official competitions (documented records).

Years	Player	Nationality	Position	Ref
1970s	Iswadi Idris	(Indonesia)	MF	
1980s	Tonny Tanamal	(Indonesia)	DF	
1996–1998	Nur'alim	(Indonesia)	DF	
1999–2002	Budiman Yunus	(Indonesia)	DF	
2003–2005	Aris Indarto	(Indonesia)	DF	
2006–2013	Bambang Pamungkas	(Indonesia)	FW	
2014–2018	Ismed Sofyan	(Indonesia)	DF	
2019–2024	Andritany Ardhiyasa	(Indonesia)	GK	
2024–present	Rizky Ridho	(Indonesia)	DF	

== Honours ==
Persija Jakarta has won many titles, including International Tournaments, making the club as the most successful football club in Indonesia.

Type	Competition	Titles	Seasons
League	PSSI Inlandsche Stedenwedstrĳden	4	1931, 1933, 1934, 1938
League	Perserikatan	5	1953–54, 1962–64, 1971–73, 1973–75, 1978/79
League	Liga Indonesia Premier Division / Liga 1 / Super League*	2	2001, 2018
Cup	Piala Presiden*	1	2018
Cup	Menpora Cup	1	2021

*Competitions that are currently active.

=== Others ===
- South Vietnam Independence Cup
  - Winners: 1973
- Brunei Invitational Cup
  - Winners (2): 2000 & 2001
- Asian Club Championship
  - First round: 2001-02
- Boost Sportsfix Super Cup, Malaysia
  - Winners: 2018
- AFC Cup
  - ASEAN zone semi-finals: 2018
  - Group stage: 2019

== Award winners ==
=== Domestic ===
- Player of the Season
  - (Indonesia) Bambang Pamungkas (2001)
  - (Nepal) Rohit Chand (2018)
- League Golden Boot
  - (Indonesia) Bambang Pamungkas (1999–00)
  - (Croatia) Marko Šimić (2019)
- Young Player of the Season
  - (Indonesia) Rezaldi Hehanussa (2017)
  - (Indonesia) Rio Fahmi (2022–23)
- Coach of the Season
  - (Brazil) Stefano Cugurra (2018)
- Goal of the Season
  - (Indonesia) Rizky Ridho against Arema on 9 March 2025. (2024–25)
- Team of the Season
  - (Indonesia) Andritany Ardhiyasa (2017, 2018, 2022–23)
  - (Indonesia) Rezaldi Hehanussa (2017)
  - (Brazil) Willian Pacheco (2017)
  - (Indonesia) Riko Simanjuntak (2018)
  - (Nepal) Rohit Chand (2018)
  - (Croatia) Marko Šimić (2019)
  - (Indonesia) Rio Fahmi (2022–23)
  - (Czech Republic) Ondřej Kúdela (2022–23)
  - (Indonesia) Rizky Ridho (2024–25)
  - (Indonesia) Dony Tri Pamungkas (2025–26)

== Records and statistics ==
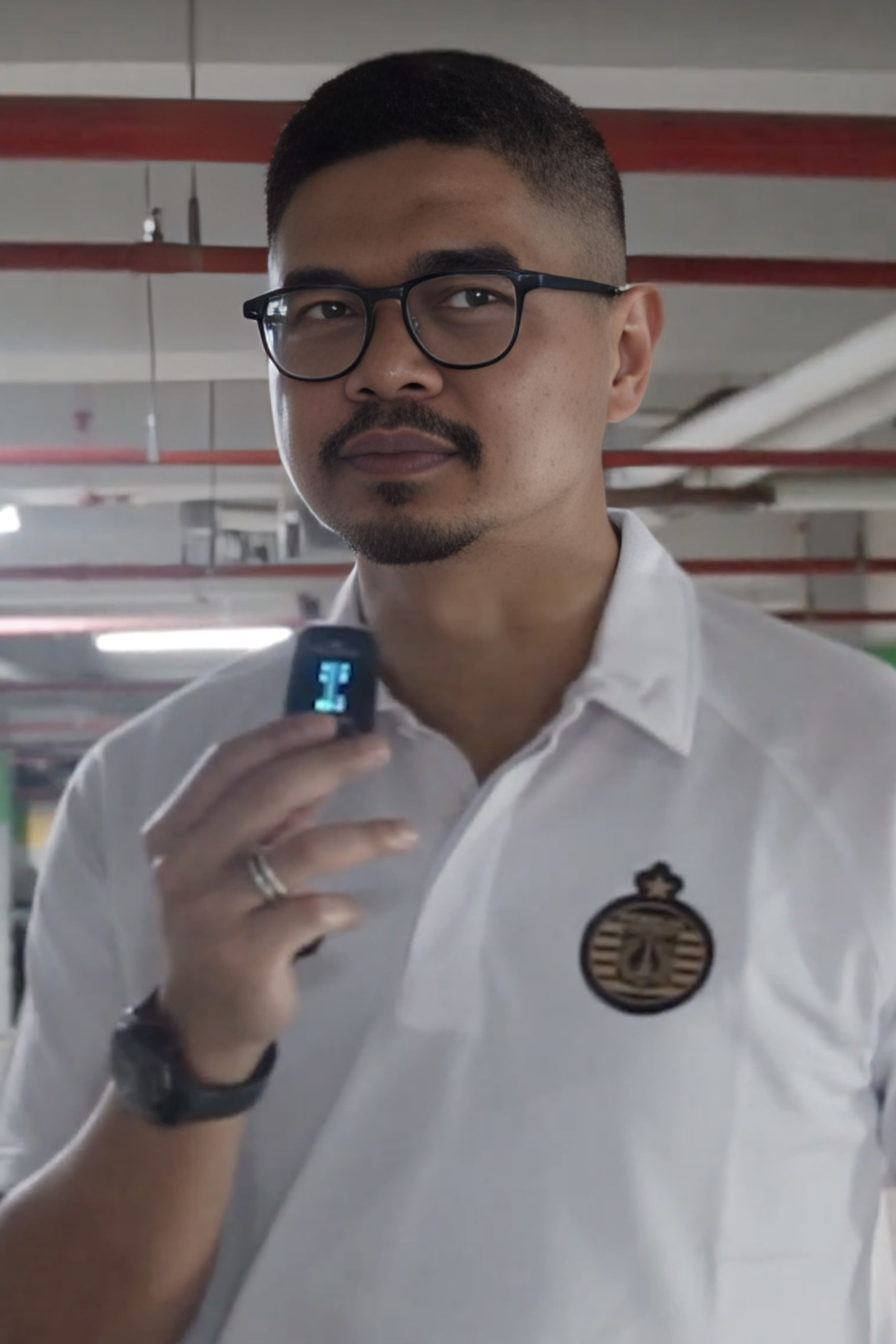
Bambang Pamungkas, Persija Jakarta all-time best player in the club history.

As of 9 October 2026.

Top 10 all-time appearances
Rank	Player	Years	Club appearances
1	(Indonesia) Bambang Pamungkas	1999–2005, 2007–2013, 2015–2019	436
2	(Indonesia) Ismed Sofyan	2002–2022	370
3	(Indonesia) Andritany Ardhiyasa	2010–present	292
4	(Indonesia) Riko Simanjuntak	2018−2026	207
5	(Indonesia) Ramdani Lestaluhu	2007–2012, 2014–2022	174
6	(Nepal) Rohit Chand	2017–2022	173
7	(Croatia) Marko Šimić	2018–2022, 2023–2025	165
8	(Indonesia) Maman Abdurahman	2016–2024	162
9	(Indonesia) Novri Setiawan	2015–2022	136
10	(Indonesia) Rio Fahmi	2021–present	130

Top 10 all-time scorers
Rank	Player	Club appearances	Total goals
1	(Indonesia) Bambang Pamungkas	436	256
2	(Croatia) Marko Šimić	165	89
3	(Brazil) Gustavo Almeida	165	33
4	(Indonesia) Ramdani Lestaluhu	174	29
5	(Paraguay) Pedro Velázquez	44	22
6	(Japan) Ryo Matsumura	72	17
7	(Brazil) Maxwell	31	16
8	(Cameroon) Emmanuel Kenmogne	17	14
8	(Brazil) Bruno Matos	23	14
10	(Nepal) Rohit Chand	173	13

- Biggest wins: 8–2 vs 757 Kepri Jaya (21 January 2019)
- Heaviest defeats: 5–1 vs RANS Nusantara (22 June 2022)
- Youngest ever debutant: Zahaby Gholy ~ 15 years 7 months 16 days old (On 21 July 2024 vs Madura United)
- Oldest ever player: Maman Abdurahman ~ 41 years 11 months 18 days old (On 30 April 2024 vs PSIS Semarang)
- Youngest goal scorers: Frengky Missa ~ 18 years 4 months 8 days old (On 28 June 2022 vs Madura United)
- Oldest goal scorers: Ismed Sofyan ~ 39 years 10 months 8 days old (On 6 July 2019 vs Borneo Samarinda)

== Notable players ==
As of 2026–27 season.

The following list is several former famous or legendary players of Persija Jakarta over the years.

Note: Not all famous players who have played for Persija Jakarta are included in this list. Only players who are strongly associated with Persija Jakarta presented here.

- (Indonesia) Soetjipto Soentoro
- (Indonesia) Tan Liong Houw
- (Indonesia) Sinyo Aliandoe
- (Indonesia) Oyong Liza
- (Indonesia) Patar Tambunan
- (Indonesia) Anjas Asmara
- (Indonesia) Iswadi Idris
- (Indonesia) Sofyan Hadi
- (Indonesia) Rahmad Darmawan
- (Indonesia) Rochy Putiray
- (Indonesia) Vennard Hutabarat
- (Cameroon) Mbeng Jean
- (Brazil) Luciano Leandro
- (Indonesia) Nuralim
- (Indonesia) Widodo C. Putro
- (Indonesia) Budiman Yunus
- (Indonesia) Gendut Doni
- (Indonesia) Budi Sudarsono
- (Indonesia) Bambang Pamungkas
- (Indonesia) Hendro Kartiko
- (Indonesia) Anang Ma'ruf
- (Indonesia) Imran Nahumarury
- (Bulgaria) Aleksandar Dimitrov
- (Indonesia) Ismed Sofyan
- (Indonesia) Elie Aiboy
- (Indonesia) Ortizan Solossa
- (Indonesia) Aris Indarto
- (Indonesia) Kurniawan Dwi Yulianto
- (Indonesia) Charis Yulianto
- (Cameroon) Roger Batoum
- (Argentina) Emanuel de Porras
- (Timor-Leste) João Bosco Cabral
- (Indonesia) Francis Wewengkang
- (Indonesia) Hamka Hamzah
- (Indonesia) Leonard Tupamahu
- (Cameroon) Herman Abanda
- (Indonesia) Aliyudin
- (Argentina) Robertino Pugliara
- (Indonesia) Greg Nwokolo
- (Indonesia) Ponaryo Astaman
- (Cameroon) Pierre Njanka
- (Indonesia) Andritany Ardhiyasa
- (Indonesia) Ramdani Lestaluhu
- (Singapore) Fahrudin Mustafić
- (Singapore) Baihakki Khaizan
- (Indonesia) Firman Utina
- (Brazil) Fabiano Beltrame
- (Croatia) Ivan Bosnjak
- (Nepal) Rohit Chand
- (Cameroon) Emmanuel Kenmogne
- (South Korea) Hong Soon-Hak
- (Indonesia) Maman Abdurrahman
- (Indonesia) Rezaldi Hehanussa
- (Indonesia) Riko Simanjuntak
- (Croatia) Marko Šimić
- (Italy) Marco Motta
- (Czech Republic) Ondřej Kúdela
- (Germany) Hanno Behrens
- (Bahrain) Abdulla Yusuf Helal
- (Czech Republic) Michael Krmenčík
- (Poland) Maciej Gajos
- (Japan) Ryo Matsumura
- (Brazil) Gustavo Almeida

=== International capped players ===
AFC/OFC.: (Bahrain) Abdulla Yusuf Helal; (Hong Kong) Lam Hok Hei; (Nepal) Rohit Chand; (Philippines) Oliver Bias; (Singapore) Agu Casmir; (Singapore) Baihakki Khaizan; (Singapore) Fahrudin Mustafić; (Singapore) Precious Emuejeraye; (South Korea) Hong Soon-hak; (South Korea) Kwon Chang-hoon; (Timor-Leste) João Bosco Cabral	CAF.: (Cameroon) Pierre Njanka; (Liberia) Boakay Foday; (Mali) Djibril Coulibaly	UEFA.: (Bosnia and Herzegovina) Kerim Memija; (Bosnia and Herzegovina) Stjepan Lončar; (Bosnia and Herzegovina) Želimir Terkeš; (Croatia) Denis Kolinger; (Croatia) Ivan Bošnjak; (Croatia) Marko Šimić; (Czech Republic) Michael Krmenčík; (Czech Republic) Ondřej Kúdela; (Italy) Marco Motta; (Serbia) Radovan Pankov; (Spain) Joan Tomàs; (Sweden) Alexander Jeremejeff	CONMEBOL/ CONCACAF.: (Brazil) Alan Cardoso; (Paraguay) Pedro Velázquez

== Managerial history ==
After becoming a professional club, Persija Jakarta has been trained by many foreign and local coaches. Sofyan Hadi was the first local head coach who won a professional national title for Persija Jakarta in 2001, when he was also played for the club in 1970s.

Brazilian defender Antônio Cláudio played for the club in the 2000s and returned as a fitness coach for the 2018–2019 season. Together with head coach Stefano Cugurra, they guided Persija to the 2018 league title. Nowadays, Maman Abdurahman who was a player of the 2018 champion squad, now serves as an assistant coach under head coach Shin Tae-yong.

Manager	Period	Achievements
(Bulgaria) Ivan Kolev	1999–2000	
(Indonesia) Sofyan Hadi	2001	2001 Liga Indonesia Premier Division
(Indonesia) Mundari Karya	2002	
(Bulgaria) Atanas Georgiev	2003	
(Argentina) Carlos García	2004	
(Moldova) Arcan Iurie	2005–2006	
(Indonesia) Rahmad Darmawan	2006–2007	
(Moldova) Sergei Dubrovin	2007–2008	
(Indonesia) Danurwindo	2008–2009	
(Indonesia) Benny Dollo (2)	2009–2010	
(Indonesia) Rahmad Darmawan (2)	2010–2011	
(Indonesia) Iwan Setiawan	2011–2012	
(Indonesia) Benny Dollo (3)	2013–2014	
(Indonesia) Rahmad Darmawan (3)	2014–2015	
(Indonesia) Bambang Nurdiansyah	2015–2016	
(Brazil) Paulo Camargo	1 March 2016–1 August 2016	
(Indonesia) Jan Saragih (caretaker)	1 August 2016–31 August 2016	
(Indonesia) Zein Al Hadad	31 August 2016–22 December 2016	
(Brazil) Stefano Cugurra	30 December 2016–4 January 2019	2018 Liga 1 2018 Indonesia President's Cup
(Bulgaria) Ivan Kolev (2)	15 January 2019–3 June 2019	
(Spain) Julio Bañuelos	8 June 2019–19 September 2019	
(Indonesia) Sudirman (caretaker)	20 September 2019–29 September 2019	
(Brazil) Edson Tavares	29 September 2019–31 December 2019	
(Brazil) Sérgio Farias	12 January 2020–10 September 2020	
(Indonesia) Sudirman (2)	10 September 2020–9 June 2021	2021 Menpora Cup
(Italy) Angelo Alessio	10 June 2021–19 Januar 2022	
(Indonesia) Sudirman (caretaker) (3)	19 January 2022–31 March 2022	
(Germany) Thomas Doll	29 April 2022–11 June 2024	
(Spain) Carlos Peña	29 June 2024–30 April 2025	
(Indonesia) Ricky Nelson (caretaker)	1 May 2025–24 May 2024	
(Brazil) Maurício Souza	27 May 2025–26 May 2026	
(South Korea) Shin Tae-yong	8 June 2026–present	

== Season by season record ==
Season	League/Division	Teams	Position	Piala Indonesia	I-League Cup	AFC competition(s)		ASEAN Club Championship
1994–95	Premier Division	34	13 in West Div.	–	–	–	–	–
1995–96	Premier Division	31	14 in West Div.	–	–	–	–	–
1996–97	Premier Division	33	10 in West Div.	–	–	–	–	–
1997–98	Premier Division	31	did not finish	–	–	–	–	–
1998–99	Premier Division	28	Semifinals	–	–	–	–	–
1999–2000	Premier Division	28	Semifinals	–	–	–	–	–
2001	Premier Division	28	1	–	–	–	–	–
2002	Premier Division	24	Second round	–	–	Asian Club Championship	First round	–
2003	Premier Division	20	7	–	–	–	–	–
2004	Premier Division	18	3	–	–	–	–	–
2005	Premier Division	28	2	Runner-up	–	–	–	–
2006	Premier Division	28	Second round	3rd place	–	–	–	–
2007–08	Premier Division	36	Semifinals	3rd place	–	–	–	–
2008–09	Indonesia Super League	18	7	Quarter-finals	–	–	–	–
2009–10	Indonesia Super League	18	5	Quarter-finals	–	–	–	–
2010–11	Indonesia Super League	15	3	–	–	–	–	–
2011–12	Indonesia Super League	18	5	Not Participated	–	–	–	–
2013	Indonesia Super League	18	11	–	–	–	–	–
2014	Indonesia Super League	22	5 in West Div.	–	–	–	–	–
2015	Indonesia Super League	18	did not finish	–	–	–	–	–
2016	Soccer Championship A	18	14	–	–	–	–	–
2017	Liga 1	18	4	–	–	–	–	–
2018	Liga 1	18	1	Runner-up	–	AFC Cup	Zonal Semi-finals	–
2019	Liga 1	18	10	Runner-up	–	AFC Champions League	Preliminary round 2	–
2019	Liga 1	18	10	Runner-up	–	AFC Cup	Group stage	–
2020	Liga 1	18	did not finish	–	–	–	–	–
2021–22	Liga 1	18	8	–	–	–	–	–
2022–23	Liga 1	18	2	–	–	–	–	–
2023–24	Liga 1	18	8	–	–	–	–	–
2024–25	Liga 1	18	7	–	–	–	–	–
2025–26	Super League	18	3	–	–	–	–	–
2026–27	Super League	18	TBD	–	TBD	–	–	–

== Continental record ==
Season	Competition	Round	Club	Home	Away	Aggregate
2001–02	Asian Club Championship	First round	(Japan) Kashima Antlers	1–4		
2018	AFC Cup	Group H	(Malaysia) Johor Darul Ta'zim	4–0	0–3	1st
2018	AFC Cup	Group H	(Singapore) Tampines Rovers	4–1	4–2	1st
2018	AFC Cup	Group H	(Vietnam) Sông Lam Nghệ An	1–0	0–0	1st
2018	AFC Cup	Zonal semi-finals	(Singapore) Home United	1–3	2–3	3–6
2019	AFC Champions League	Preliminary round 1	(Singapore) Home United	1–3		
2019	AFC Champions League	Preliminary round 2	(Australia) Newcastle Jets	3–1 (a.e.t.)		
2019	AFC Cup	Group G	(Vietnam) Becamex Bình Dương	0–0	1–3	3rd
2019	AFC Cup	Group G	(Myanmar) Shan United	6–1	3–1	3rd
2019	AFC Cup	Group G	(Philippines) Ceres Negros	2–3	0–1	3rd

== AFC ranking ==
As of 4 May 2025

Current Rank	Country	Team	Points
87	(Iran)	Aluminium Arak	1361
88	(China)	Tianjin Jinmen Tiger	1361
89	(Indonesia)	Persija Jakarta	1360
90	(Indonesia)	Bali United	1360
91	(Japan)	Hokkaido Consadole Sapporo	1358

== Sponsors & partners ==
The following is a list of sponsors and partners supporting Persija Jakarta for the 2026–27 season.

Category	Name
Sponsors	Macan Kemayoran
Sponsors	Bank Jakarta
Sponsors	PAM Jaya
Sponsors	Indomie
Sponsors	Bakrie Untuk Negeri
Sponsors	Se’Indonesia
Sponsors	Tapin Coal Mineral
Sponsors	LIMA by Anargya
Sponsors	Upbit
Sponsors	PS Store
Sponsors	Hongsam Ball
Sponsors	Le Minerale
Sponsors	Adidas
Partners	JakPro
Partners	Transjakarta
Partners	MRT Jakarta
Partners	Pocari Sweat
Partners	Sony
Partners	Elite Club
Partners	RS Premier Bintaro
