= 1974 Emperor's Cup final =

1974 Emperor's Cup Final
Yanmar Diesel	Eidai Industries
2	1
- Date: January 1, 1975
- Venue: National Stadium, Tokyo

1974 Emperor's Cup Final was the 54th final of the Emperor's Cup competition. The final was played at National Stadium in Tokyo on January 1, 1975. Yanmar Diesel won the championship.

== Overview ==
Yanmar Diesel won their 3rd title, by defeating Eidai Industries 2–1.

== Match details ==
January 1, 1975

Yanmar Diesel	2–1	Eidai Industries
? (?) ? (?)		? (?)

National Stadium

Yanmar Diesel
GK	1	(Japan) Shinjirō Nishikata
DF	2	(Japan) Shigeo Kitamura
DF	4	(Japan) Yushi Matsumura
DF	3	(Japan) Masahiro Hamatama
DF	17	(Japan) Toshiyuki Tagami
DF	5	(Japan) George Kobayashi
MF	8	(Japan) Daishiro Yoshimura
MF	10	(Japan) Hiroo Abe
MF	7	(Japan) Hiroji Imamura
MF	12	(Japan) Yoshiharu Horii
FW	9	(Japan) Kunishige Kamamoto
Substitutes:
GK	21	(Japan) Teruhisa Kakiuchi
FW	20	(Japan) Kazuo Kaminishi
DF	16	(Japan) Hiroshi Sakano
DF	17	(Japan) Shigeyuki Taguchi
DF	2	(Japan) Shigeru Kitamura
MF	14	(Japan) Mitsuo Abe
Manager:
(Japan) Kenji Onitake

Eidai Industries
GK	(Japan) Yoshiteru Shiroyama
DF	(Japan) Makoto Yamamoto
DF	(Japan) Shoji Inoue
DF	(Japan) Eiji Kiyota
DF	(Japan) Toshifumi Kajitani
MF	(Brazil) Jairo Matos
MF	(Brazil) Jair Novaes
MF	(Japan) Yoshiaki Matsubara
MF	(Japan) Tsutomu Nakayama
FW	(Japan) Michiaki Nakamura
FW	(Japan) Riki Suzuki
Substitutes:
FW	(Japan) Minoru Ozaki	Substituted on
DF	(Japan) Toshihiko Shiozawa
GK	(Japan) Kiyoshi Takada
Manager:
(Japan) Ken Okubo

== See also ==
- 1974 Emperor's Cup
