= PSMS Medan =

Indonesian football club

- Full name: Persatuan Sepakbola Medan dan Sekitarnya
- Nickname: Ayam Kinantan (The Gamecocks)
- Short name: MDN
- Founded: 21 April 1950; 76 years ago
- Ground: North Sumatra Stadium
- Capacity: 25,750
- Owner: PT Kinantan Medan Indonesia
- Head coach: Eko Purdjianto
- League: Championship
- 2025–26: 7th (1st Group)
- Website: www.psms.id
Home colours	Away colours

Persatuan Sepakbola Medan dan Sekitarnya, commonly known as PSMS, is an Indonesian professional football club based in Medan, North Sumatra. It is one of Indonesia's most successful clubs. They currently compete in the Championship, the second level in the Indonesian football pyramid.

== History ==
=== Early years (1907–1950) ===
PSMS history starts with DVB. Stakeholders in Medan began the first general meeting to form the union on 7 July 1907 (see De Sumatra post, 08–07–1907). Later, with the establishment of OSVB in 1915, DVB openly stated that it was willing to merge with OSVB. In accordance with the development of the situation and conditions, the OSVB coverage area was no longer effective. In September 1949, stakeholders in Medan formed VBMO. In order to adjust the VUVSI (NIVU succession) policy in 1948 to translate VUVSI as ISNIS, the VBMO was also translated as PSMS and then the Medan football union was called VBMO / PSMS.

In March 1950, the Dutch military left Medan. Football organizations of the State of East Sumatra during the Dutch population, Rumah Susun Football Club (RSFC) and Oost Sumatra Voettbal Bond (OSVB), which had been founded since the early 1930s and then in 1950 changed their name to the Persatuan Sepakbola Medan dan Sekitarnya or were shortened to PSMS. However, there is no clear evidence that MVC, DVB, OSVB, VBMO, RSFC and other football clubs that were founded during the Dutch colonial period were PSMS offshoots.

The representatives of the 6 amateur clubs in Medan in 1950 were responsible for the birth of PSMS. They were Adinegoro (Al Wathan), Madja Purba (Sahata), Sulaiman Siregar (PO Police), TM Harris (Medan Sport), Dr Pierngadi (Deli Matschapij) and Tedja Singh (India Football Team). They coordinated the 23 clubs in Medan at that time to establish PSMS Medan on 21 April 1950.

The city of Medan has long been known to the world because of its Deli tobacco plantations, thus the PSMS logo being leaves and deli tobacco flowers. Deli tobacco is also the symbol of PSMS Medan. 1950 marks the birth of PSMS on 21 April of that year. The green symbolises plantations, while white means holy, and sportive in a broader sense. Green is maintained as the main kit color for PSMS Medan. Green can also symbolise coolness, freshness and calm.

PSMS Medan is known for its typical type of rap-rap game, namely football which is hard, fast and insistent but still plays clean and upholds sportsmanship. This is what is often shown by the team nicknamed "The Killers" and is now nicknamed "Ayam Kinantan".

PSMS are a football club which originated in and remain based in Kebun Bunga Stadium Jl. Candi Borobudur No.2, Medan.

=== The Killers era (1954–1967) ===
PSMS glories eras occurred since 1954. At that time, PSMS were often invited by teams from overseas such as Grazer AK, Kowloon Motorbus (Hong Kong), Grasshopper, Star Soccerites (Singapore) and others. Thanks to the victories often tasted by PSMS against foreign teams, PSMS earned the nicknames the "Killers" or "Executioners" of the teams from abroad.

The existence of PSMS in the early days of their appearance were no doubt. PSMS often won against every domestic and foreign clubs matches. At that time PSMS was dubbed the nickname The Killer because they always beat his opponent on the field. At that time PSMS also consisted of the phenomenal players like Ramlan Yatim, Ramli Yatim, Buyung Bahrum, Kliwon, Cornelius Siahaan, Yusuf Siregar, M.Rasijd, Arnold Van Der Vin and others. Their dribble expertise made PSMS and North Sumatra often won several tournaments and sports leagues. In 1953 and 1957 PSMS players who defended the North Sumatra Team at the Pekan Olahraga Nasional presented the gold medal. In Perserikatan 1954 and 1957 PSMS won the Runner Up title.At the 1956 Olympics in Melbourne 3 PSMS Medan players, namely Ramlan Yatim, Ramli Yatim and M.Rasijd appeared to defend the National Football Team that appeared at the Olympics.

=== Perserikatan era (1967–1990) ===
Entering the 1960s, PSMS became a frightening specter for the clubs in Indonesia. In April 1967, the Suratin Cup Final took place at the Menteng Stadium, Jakarta. In this final round, PSMS Jr who was coached by PSMS Legend Ramli Yatim managed to show off as the main force of football at that time.

Ramli Yatim managed to polish the figures of Ronny Pasla, Sarman Panggabean, Wibisono, Tumsila, Nobon etc. as future stars of Medan and Indonesia. In the final which took place on 26 April 1967, PSMS faced the host who was also their mortal enemy, Persija. Ronny Pasla became the star in this duel with his brilliant action under the bar. Because it was getting dark and Menteng Stadium did not have proper lighting, it was finally decided that PSMS and Persija would become Joint Champions with the provision that the first 6 months of the trophy was brought to Medan and the next 6 months the trophy was brought to Jakarta.

The success of the PSMS Jr squad prompted PSMS coach Jusuf Siregar who was accompanied by Ramli Yatim to promote several PSMS Jr players to the PSMS Senior Team that competed in the 1967 PSSI National Championship, including Ronny Pasla, Tumsila, Sarman Panggabean and Wibisono. The combination of these young players with senior players including Yuswardi, Zulham Yahya, Sukiman, Ipong Silalahi, Muslim, A.Rahim, Syamsuddin, Sunarto, Aziz Siregar, Zulkarnaen Pasaribu etc. turned out to be a great success, making PSMS more solid and finally succeeded in becoming champions. West Region and qualified for the semifinals which took place in Jakarta accompanied by Persib. In the semifinals which took place at the Senayan Jakarta Main Stadium, PSMS faced Persebaya and Persib faced PSM. In this semi-final, the match took place twice, namely on 6 and 7 September 1967. In this first semi-final, PSMS lost 0–1 to Persebaya. In the duel that took place tonight PSMS did not have its star Zulham Yahya who was suspended due to a red card in the group stage and his position was occupied by young star Sarman Panggabean. While Persib won 1–0 over PSM. In the second match on 7 September 1967 PSMS beat Persebaya 3–1 and Persib drew 1–1 with PSM. Be Final brought together PSMS with Persib in the Final on 10 September 1967.

In this Final PSMS got a tough test because one of its players, Djamal was injured and finally the position was occupied by the player of PSMS, Sarman Panggabean. And Zulham Yahya can appear again. In addition to Sarman and Ronny Pasla in the Final, the young striker Tumsila also started as a starter. It turned out that in this Final PSMS managed to beat Persib 2–0 through goals scored by A.Rahim and Zulkarnaen Pasaribu against Persib's goal, which was escorted by Jus Etek. This is the first time PSMS Medan has won the National Championship/Main Division of the Perserikatan PSSI since its establishment in 1950 and was greeted with cheers from the supporters of PSMS Medan in Jakarta and in North Sumatra.

The success of PSMS made PSMS Medan represent Indonesia in the 1967 Aga Khan Gold Cup which took place in Bangladesh. And finally in this Tournament PSMS succeeded in becoming the Champion after in the Final defeated the home team Mohammaden 2–0 through 2 goals from Tumsila's heading. When returning to Medan, the group was greeted by Pangdam II/Bukit Barisan Maj. Gen. Sarwo Edhie Wibowo and this is where Sarwo Edhie gave the nickname "Golden Head" to Tumsila because of his capable ability to score goals with headers and since then the nickname "Golden Head" has stuck with Tumsila both in PSMS and the national team. That was the time when 1967 PSMS became the "King" of Indonesian Football

After the national team won the 1968 King's Cup, the national team players were contracted professionally by T.D Pardede at his club, Pardedetex. The contracted players include Soetjipto Soentoro, Sinyo Aliandoe, Iswadi Idris, Judo Hadianto, Muliyadi (Persija), M. Basri (PSM), Abdul Kadir, Jacob Sihasale (Persebaya), Anwar Udjang (Persika), Max Timisela (Persib), plus there are 3 stars of PSMS Medan, namely Sarman Panggabean, Sunarto and Aziz Siregar. Because at that time Pardedetex even though contracted players professionally but in the competition took shelter in the PSMS Main Class / Main Division so that automatically the Pardedetex squad strengthened PSMS in the 1969 PSSI National Championship/Main Division.This Pardedetex squad strengthens PSMS plus and is supported by Medan Football Player Non Pardedetex, among others, Ronny Pasla, Yuswardi, Tumsila, Zulham Yahya, Ipong Silalahi, Syamsuddin and in certain moments Sukiman and Nobon are added. This squad was trained by Ramli Yatim and E A Mangindaan.

It was this squad that brought PSMS Medan to the 1969 PSSI National Championship on 6 July 1969 with a terrible goal record in the Finals which was participated by 7 teams, which included 29 goals and only conceded 2 goals and was unbeaten. The 7 teams that competed in the final round of the PSSI National Championship were PSMS Medan, Persija Jakarta, Persebaya Surabaya, PSM Makassar, Persib Bandung, PSKB Binjai and Persipura Jayapura. This success made PSMS Medan for the second time win the PSSI National Championship after previously becoming the PSSI National Championship Champion in 1967.

In September 1969 the PSMS squad, which succeeded in becoming the PSSI National Championship Champion, defended the banner of North Sumatra (Sumut) in PON VII which took place in Surabaya. In this PON, the North Sumatran squad, which was managed by Ramli Yatim and EA Mangindaan, performed brilliantly and brought North Sumatra to win the Gold Medal after the final which was marked by scuffles between players, defeated DKI Jakarta 2–1 through goals scored by Iswadi Idris and Soetjipto Soentoro. This is the third gold medal for North Sumatra in the PON football branch after previously winning Gold in PON 1953 and 1957. At the 1969 PON, Soetjipto Soentoro became the top scorer with 16 goals and broke the record previously held by senior PSMS star and North Sumatran Yusuf Siregar in the 1953 PON with 15 goals. Tjipto's record itself still stands and has not been broken. Ramli Yatim also succeeded in becoming the first person to win the PON Gold Medal as a Player and Coach. As a player, Ramli Yatim won Gold in PON 1953 and 1957.

PSMS retained the title 1969–1971 season after beating Persebaya again in the final. And with Persija Jakarta, they became joint champions in the 1973–1975 season due to excessive protests to the referee in the 40th minute that caused the match had to be stopped.

PSMS are the Indonesian first club who have competed in the Asian Champion Club Tournament (now the AFC Champions League) in 1970. PSMS won fourth place in the semi-finals after defeated by Taj Club 2–0 and in the third place match was defeated by Homenetmen 1–0.

After 8 years without a title, finally PSMS ended their title drought in 1983 after in the final, they defeated Persib Bandung 3–2 in a penalty shootout (a.e.t. 0–0). They returned to defend the title in the 1985 season when they defeated Persib 2–1 in a penalty shootout (a.e.t. 2–2). The match was played at Gelora Bung Karno Stadium, and was witnessed by 150.000 spectators of 110.000 seating capacity, which made a highest attendance record in the history of Indonesian football. According to the Asian Football Confederation book that published in 1987, this match was the biggest match in the history of amateur football in the world.

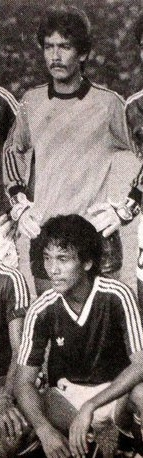
Ponirin Meka (goalkeeper) and Jaya Hartono, the important players of PSMS in 1980s

PSMS were strengthened by many players such as Yuswardi, Muslim, Sunarto, Sukiman, Ipong Silalahi, Wibisono, Tumsila, Sarman Panggabean, Suwarno, Tumpak Sihite, Nobon Kayamuddin, Zulkarnaen Pasaribu, Ismail Ruslan, Parlin Siagian, Sunardi B, Marzuki Nyakmad, Zulham Effendi Harahap, Sunardi A., Bambang Usmanto, Musimin, Sakum Nugroho M. Siddik, Ricky Yacobi, Abdul Kadir, Jacob Sihasale, Ronny Pasla, Yudo Hadianto, M.Basri, Taufik Lubis, Pariman, Iswadi Idris, Abdul Rahman Gurning, Anwar Ujang, Ponirin Meka, Jaya Hartono, Zulkarnaen Lubis, Sakum Nugroho, Soetjipto Soentoro and others.

=== The end of glories eras; Liga Indonesia era (1990–2001) ===
PSMS glories eras ended in the early 1990s. In the 1991–92 season, they became the runner-up when they lost to PSM Makassar 2–1 in the final. When the era of Perserikatan ended and turned into the Liga Indonesia, PSMS achievement was up and down. In the Liga Indonesia 1994-95 and 1995–96, they became the mid-table club. Even in the 1996–97 season, PSMS almost relegated to First Division. The situation improved when in 1997–98 season, they ranked 1st at the west division. But the competition was stopped due to the May 1998 riots which made the security condition in Indonesia was not conducive.

After the riots, Liga Indonesia was held again in the season 1998–99. In this season, PSMS managed to qualify for the semi-finals. In the semi-final, they lost against Persebaya 4–2 in a penalty shootout (a.e.t. 1–1). In that game, PSMS wore their away costume. In the next season, they qualified for the last 8 and ranked 4th in Group A along with PSM, Pupuk Kaltim, and Persijatim. In the season 2001, they qualified to the semi-finals and would play against PSM. They lost 3–2 in a penalty shootout (a.e.t. 2–2).

=== Relegation and promotion (2002–2003) ===
Although they became semi-finalist in the Liga Indonesia 2001, it did not guarantee the success of PSMS in the next season. After starting two games poorly, their poor form finally stopped when they played against Arema FC. They won 1–0, thanks to Suharyono goal in the 87th minute. After the game, poor form still haunted PSMS. Finally at the end of the season, they ranked 11th, which meant that they were relegated to First Division. This was the worst achievement in the history of the club.

PSMS rose above adversity. Playing in 2003 First Division, PSMS were in Group A along with Persiraja Banda Aceh, PSSB Bireun, Persikad Depok, PSBL Langsa, Perserang Serang, and PSBL Bandar Lampung. PSMS ranked 1st and made sure to qualify for the last eight. PSMS started the game in the last eight very well. Won 2–1 against Persela Lamongan in the first game, PSMS was losing 1–2 against Persiraja in the second game. The fierce competition ensued at the top of the league, and finally PSMS ranked 2nd and ensured their promotion to the Liga Indonesia along with Persebaya.

=== Ups and downs (2004–2008) ===
Upon returning to the Liga Indonesia 2004, PSMS performance was not very bad. They started the season poorly, PSMS finished the season by being in 7th position with 47 points, the result of 14 wins, 5 draws and 15 defeats.

Before entering the new season, they won the second edition of Bang Yos Gold Cup, a pre-season competition initiated by Sutiyoso, the governor of Jakarta at that time. In the final, they beat Geylang United 5–1 at Gelora Bung Karno Stadium. Entering the 2005 season, Liga Indonesia format changed from the format of one region into two regions (west and east). PSMS located in the western region along with their rivals, Persija and Persib. They started the season dramatically, by defeating PSPS Pekanbaru 3–2 in Teladan Stadium. Erratic performance made the competition with Persib to qualify for the round of eight. With the very fierce competition, PSMS finally qualified to the round of eight after being in 4th position, 4-point difference with Persib in 5th position. In the round of eight, PSMS were in Group B along with Persipura Jayapura, Persik Kediri, and Arema. In the first game, they played a goalless draw against Arema. Their hope to qualify for the finals came when they won 2–1 against Persik, but their hope vanished when they lost 1–0 to Persipura. They only qualified for the third place playoff against PSIS Semarang. In that game, they conceded first by Muhammad Ridwan goal in the 12th minute. Alcidio Fleitas equalized in the 21st minute. PSIS ensured their victory by Harri Salisburi goal in the 78th minute. PSIS won third place, while PSMS won fourth place.

Like the previous season, PSMS competed in the third edition of Bang Yos Gold Cup before entering the new season. They managed to retain the title they have won the previous edition, after their 2–1 win against Persik in the final. In 2006 season, their performance declined slightly than last season, because they were just in 5th position, 3-point difference with Persekabpas Pasuruan, which made them fail to qualify for the last 8. The competition of the fourth position in the western region between PSMS and Persekabpas was very dramatic. In the last game in the western region, PSMS lost against Persijap Jepara 0–1 at home, while Persekabpas won 3–2 against Sriwijaya FC. Persekabpas qualified for the last 8 as they were in 4th position in the western region.

PSMS tried to improve their performance in the 2007–08 season. With their successful to retain their title in the fourth edition of Bang Yos Gold Cup that made them the immortal owner of Bang Yos Gold Cup, they believed they could won their first title in Liga Indonesia since the era of Perserikatan ended. Their ambition was almost achieved after they were in 3rd position in the western region under Sriwijaya FC and Persija, who made them qualify for the last 8. In the last 8, they were in Group A along with Sriwijaya FC, Arema, and Persiwa Wamena. They managed to qualify for the semi-finals after they were in second place under Sriwijaya FC. They met Persipura in the semi-finals, and they qualified for the final as they won 4–5 in a penalty shootout (a.e.t. 0–0). This was the PSMS first final match in the era of Liga Indonesia. In the final, they had to admit defeat on Sriwijaya FC 3–1.

=== Super League era (2008–2009) ===
Because the Football Association of Indonesia wanted to introduce the professionalism of Indonesian football competition by making Indonesia Super League as the highest competition, PSMS had to relocate to Gelora Bung Karno Stadium as their home since Teladan Stadium did not fulfill the criteria of professionalism which were created by the League Board of Indonesia. By the start of the 2008–09 season, PSMS were still haunted by internal polemics between the management team with the manager who raised the PSMS resignation news of Indonesian Super League 2008–09. Finally on 10 July 2008, the League Board of Indonesia decided to continue to include PSMS Medan to Indonesia Super League.

Entering the first season of the Indonesia Super League, PSMS were hit a lot of problems. Starting from the massive exodus of star players who came out because of unresolved salary issues, then Teladan Stadium did not pass the stratification of Indonesia Super League which makes PSMS must move their home base, until the problem of disunity in the body of the club. PSMS started the league very badly. Under the coaching of Iwan Setiawan, PSMS were struggling in the relegation zone along the half of the first round. Looking at these achievements, Iwan Setiawan eventually sacked and replaced by New Zealander coach Eric Williams. Conditions were never changed. Eric Williams could not lift PSMS into a better position, so that he also sacked at the end of the first round and was replaced by Brazilian coach Luciano Leandro. He was only able to be in PSMS for less than three months before he was sacked on 5 February 2009 following the poor results of the last two games.

Entering the second round of the league, major improvements were done. Among these are made the assistant coach Liestiadi as head coach in place of Luciano Leandro, and to move their home base from Siliwangi Stadium to Gelora Sriwijaya Stadium. PSMS gradually climbed out of the relegation zone. Even in the AFC Cup 2009, PSMS made a record as the first Indonesian football club who reached the last 16 after being the runner-up of Group F under South China, although they were later defeated by Chonburi FC 4–0 in the last 16. But unfortunately at the end of the league, PSMS were in 15th position which forced PSMS to play the promotion/relegation play-off against the fourth place of 2008–09 Liga Indonesia Premier Division, Persebaya Surabaya.

PSMS were eventually relegated for the second time after 5–4 defeat in a penalty shootout (a.e.t. 1–1) at Siliwangi Stadium. For the second time, PSMS had to accept the reality of relegation after finishing the previous season as a runner-up of league.

=== Dualism Era (2009–2015) ===
In 2011, PSMS was divided into two teams, one team led by Idris SE played in the Indonesia Super League and the other led by Freddy Hutabarat in the Indonesian Premier League.

=== Current (2015–present) ===
In 2015, PSMS ended their dualism and started their campaign by winning Kemerdekaan Cup and also participated in the Indonesia Soccer Championship B. In 2017, PSMS placed 2nd in Liga 2 and got promoted to Liga 1 2018 season, but they were relegated again in just 1 season after finishing at the 18th place.

== Head coaches ==
Name	Years
(Brazil) Jairo Matos	1997
(Indonesia) Suimin Diharja	1998–2002
(Indonesia) Parlin Siagian	2002
(Indonesia) Abdul Rahman Gurning	2002–2003
(Indonesia) Nobon Kayamuddin	2003
(Indonesia) Sutan Harhara	2003–2005
(Indonesia) M. Khaidir	2005–2006
(Indonesia) Rudi Saari	2006
(Indonesia) Freddy Muli	2006–2008
(Indonesia) Iwan Setiawan	2008
(Australia) Eric Williams	2008
(Brazil) Luciano Leandro	2008–2009
(Indonesia) Liestiadi	2009
(Indonesia) Rudy Keltjes	2009–2010
(Indonesia) Zulkarnain Pasaribu	2010
(Indonesia) Rudy Keltjes	2010–2011
(Malaysia) Raja Isa (ISL)	2011–2012
(Indonesia) Edhie Putra Jie (IPL)	2011
(Italy) Fabio Lopez (IPL)	2011–2013
(Indonesia) A.D. Suharto (ISC B)	2015
(Indonesia) Abdul Rahman Gurning (ISC B)	2016
(Indonesia) Mahruzar Nasution	2017
(Indonesia) Djadjang Nurdjaman	2017–2018
(England) Peter Butler	2018
(Indonesia) Abdul Rahman Gurning	2019
(Indonesia) Jafri Sastra	2019
(Indonesia) Philip Hansen Maramis	2020
(Brazil) Gomes de Oliveira	2020
(Indonesia) Ansyari Lubis	2021–2022
(Indonesia) Putu Gede Suwi Santoso	2022–2023
(Indonesia) Ridwan Saragih	2023
(Indonesia) Miftahudin Mukson	2023–2024
(Indonesia) Nil Maizar	2024–2025
(Indonesia) Kas Hartadi	2025–2026
(Indonesia) Eko Purdjianto	2026–

== Club officials ==
Position	Name
Club President	(Indonesia) Fendi Jonathan
Team manager	(Indonesia) Riris Sufadli

=== Coaching staff ===
Position	Name
Head coach	(Indonesia) Eko Purdjianto
Assistant coaches	(Indonesia) Welliansyah
Assistant coaches	(Indonesia) Legimin Raharjo
Goalkeeper coach	(Indonesia) Hendro Kartiko
Fitness coach	(Indonesia) Ruly Hidayansyah
Video analyst	(Indonesia) Yayan Setiawan
Kitman	(Indonesia) Abraham

== Players ==
=== Current squad ===
As of September 2026

Note: Flags indicate national team as defined under FIFA eligibility rules; some limited exceptions apply. Players may hold more than one non-FIFA nationality.

No.	Pos.	Nation	Player
1	GK	IDN	Deden Natshir
2	DF	IDN	Rayhan Utina
3	DF	POR	Ângelo Meneses
4	DF	IDN	Haykal Alhafiz
5	DF	IDN	Bintang Arrahim
7	MF	IDN	Irfan Jauhari
8	MF	IDN	Adlin Cahya
9	FW	ESP	Javier Siverio
10	MF	BRA	Phillerson
12	DF	IDN	Samuel Simanjuntak
13	MF	IDN	Dani Saputra
14	FW	IDN	Raihan Utama
15	MF	IDN	Rangga Muslim
17	FW	IDN	Taufik Hidayat
19	MF	IDN	Pramoedya Putra
21	MF	IDN	Ikhsan Chan

No.	Pos.	Nation	Player
22	GK	IDN	Ahmad Gunandi
23	DF	IDN	Sulthan Zaky
24	MF	IDN	Akram Albar
26	DF	IDN	Rizdjar Nurviat
27	DF	IDN	Rizky Syahputra
28	MF	IDN	Abdul Zaki Alim
30	FW	IDN	Muhammad Ragil (on loan from Bhayangkara Presisi)
31	GK	IDN	Fakhrurrazi Quba
54	MF	IDN	Roken Tampubolon
55	DF	IDN	Asyraq Gufron
65	GK	IDN	Rudi Nurdin
68	MF	IDN	Muhammad Farhan
69	MF	IDN	Manahati Lestusen
96	DF	IDN	Azis Hutagalung
99	FW	IDN	Rachmad Hidayat

== Honours ==
National
Competition	Titles	Runners-up	Seasons won	Seasons runners-up
Perserikatan	5	4	1966–1967, 1969–1971, 1973–1975, 1983, 1985	1953–1954, 1955–1957, 1978–1979, 1991–1992
Liga Indonesia Premier Division	0	1		2007–2008
Liga Indonesia First Division / Liga 2	0	2		2003, 2017
International
Tournament	Titles	Runners-up	Seasons won	Seasons runners-up
Aga Khan Gold Cup	1	0	1967	
President's Cup/Korea Cup	0	1		1974

== Performance in AFC Asian club competitions ==
Season	Competition	Round		Club	Home	Away
1970	Asian Champion Club Tournament	Group stage	(India)	West Bengal	–	1–0
1970	Asian Champion Club Tournament	Group stage	(Thailand)	Royal Thai Police	–	4–0
1970	Asian Champion Club Tournament	Group stage	(Israel)	Hapoel Tel Aviv	–	1–3
1970	Asian Champion Club Tournament	Semi-finals	(Iran)	Taj Club	–	0–2
1970	Asian Champion Club Tournament	Third place match	(Lebanon)	Homenetmen	–	0–1
2009	AFC Champions League	Play-off round	(Singapore)	Singapore Armed Forces	–	1–2 (aet)
2009	AFC Cup	Group stage	(Hong Kong)	South China	2–2	0–3
2009	AFC Cup	Group stage	(Malaysia)	Johor FC	3–1	1–0
2009	AFC Cup	Group stage	(Maldives)	VB Sports Club	1–0	2–1
2009	AFC Cup	Round of 16	(Thailand)	Chonburi	–	0–4

== Season-by-season records ==
Season	Tier	League	League position	Piala Indonesia	I-League Cup	Asian competition(s)	
1994–95	1	Premier Division	9th (West Division)	–	–	–	–
1995–96	1	Premier Division	11th (West Division)	–	–	–	–
1996–97	1	Premier Division	10th (Central Division)	–	–	–	–
1997–98	1	Premier Division	Season abandoned	–	–	–	–
1998–99	1	Premier Division	Semifinal	–	–	–	–
1999–00	1	Premier Division	Second round	–	–	–	–
2001	1	Premier Division	Semifinal	–	–	–	–
2002	1	Premier Division	11th, (West Division)	–	–	–	–
2003	2	First Division	2nd	–	–	–	–
2004	1	Premier Division	7th	–	–	–	–
2005	1	Premier Division	4th	Semifinal	–	–	–
2006	1	Premier Division	5th (West Division)	4th	–	–	–
2007–08	1	Premier Division	2nd	Quarter-finals	–	–	–
2008–09	1	Indonesia Super League	15th	Quarter-finals	–	AFC Champions League	Play off round
2008–09	1	Indonesia Super League	15th	Quarter-finals	–	AFC Cup	Round of 16
2009–10	2	Premier Division	9th (West Division)	Did not participated	–	–	–
2010–11	2	Premier Division	Second round (big 8)	–	–	–	–
2011–12	1	Indonesia Super League	16th	Did not participated	–	–	–
2013	2	Premier Division	4th (Group 1)	–	–	–	–
2014	2	Premier Division	3rd (Group 1)	–	–	–	–
2015	2	Premier Division	Season not finished	–	–	–	–
2016	2	Indonesia Soccer Championship B	3rd (Group 1)	–	–	–	–
2017	2	Liga 2	2nd	–	–	–	–
2018	1	Liga 1	18th	Round of 64	–	–	–
2019	2	Liga 2	Second round (big 8)	–	–	–	–
2020	2	Liga 2	Season declared void	–	–	–	–
2021	2	Liga 2	Second round (big 8)	–	–	–	–
2022–23	2	Liga 2	Season declared void	–	–	–	–
2023–24	2	Liga 2	4th Championship round (Group X)	–	–	–	–
2024–25	2	Liga 2	1st Relegation round (Group H)	–	–	–	–
2025–26	2	Championship	7th, Group 1	–	–	–	–
2026–27	2	Championship	TBD	–	TBD	–	–

Key

- Tms. = Number of teams
- Pos. = Position in league
