= João Bosco Cabral =

East Timorese footballer

Personal information
- Full name: João Bosco Ribeiro Cabral
- Date of birth: 7 July 1975 (age 51)
- Place of birth: Portuguese Timor, (now East Timor)
- Position: Defender

Senior career*
Years	Team	Apps	(Gls)
2002–2002	Persikota Tangerang		
2003–2005	PSPS Pekanbaru		
2006–2008	Persija Jakarta		
2011–2012	Bali Devata F.C.		

International career
2005	East Timor		
- * Club domestic league appearances and goals

João Bosco Ribeiro Cabral (born 7 July 1975) is a Timorese retired professional footballer who previously line up for Bali Devata and the East Timor national football team.

== Career ==
=== Persija ===
Spending 2006 to 2008 with Persija Jakarta, Cabral was regarded as an important part of their defense.

=== Following retirement ===
Never vacillating between retirement and continuing his football career, the Timorese defender became a travel agent and tour guide in Bali since 2013, actively following the development of Indonesian football.

== Personal life ==
Cabral is a devout Christian.
