= Chris Yarangga =

Indonesian footballer

Personal information
- Full name: Chris Leo Yarangga
- Date of birth: 21 February 1973 (age 53)
- Place of birth: Jayapura, Indonesia
- Height: 1.84 m (6 ft 0 in)
- Position: Midfielder

Youth career
- 1986–1992: PPLP Papua

Senior career*
Years	Team	Apps	(Gls)
1993–2003	Persipura Jayapura		

International career
1996–1997	Indonesia	7	(0)

Managerial career
- 2012–: Nafri
- * Club domestic league appearances and goals

Chris Leo Yarangga (born 21 February 1973) is an Indonesian former footballer who plays as a midfielder. He became the coach of Nafri (previously named SSB Nafri), a football club he founded in 2012, as well as its chairman.
