= Jairo Matos =

Brazilian footballer (1947–2025)

Personal information
- Full name: Jairo Matos
- Date of birth: 19 November 1952 (age 73)
- Place of birth: Guanhães, Minas Gerais, Brazil
- Position: Midfielder

Senior career*
Years	Team	Apps	(Gls)
1974–1976	Eidai Industries		
1977–1981	Yomiuri		
1982–1984	Pardedetex		

Managerial career
- 1997: PSMS Medan
- * Club domestic league appearances and goals

Jairo Matos (born 19 November 1952) is a Brazilian retired footballer. He played as a midfielder for Eidai Industries and Yomiuri within the Japan Soccer League throughout the 1970s. He was also known as one of the first foreign players to play in Indonesia, playing for Pardedetex throughout the early 1980s.

== Club career ==
Following their debut at the 1973 Japan Soccer League, Eidai Industries manager Ken Okubo had sought out foreign talent for the club. Thus, Matos was chosen alongside Jair Novaes and Antonio Pelé. The following 1974 Japan Soccer League saw the club nearly relegated, barely winning out against Fujitsu. However, the 1974 Emperor's Cup was far more successful as the club reached the final, narrowly losing out to Yanmar Diesel. He remained with Eidai throughout the club's existence until their bankruptcy in March 1977. Thus, for the 1977 Japan Soccer League saw Matos and many other former Eidai players continue their careers with Yomiuri with Matos being a top scorer for the club throughout the late 1970s. His tenure with Yomiuri saw him help the club achieve promotion in 1978 as well as being part of the winning squad for the 1979 JSL Cup.

Meanwhile, Indonesian businessman Tumpal Doranius Pardede had wanted a foreign player to sign for his club Pardedetex. Seeing how Matos still struggled to get used to the climate of Japan, offered him a contract to play for the upcoming 1982–83 Galatama. After agreeing, Matos alongside many players for the Indonesia national football team and German footballer Ulrich Wilson were signed for the season that saw the club end in 3rd place. Throughout his short-lived career in Indonesia saw him become a fan-favorite for the club even during difficult financial times for the club. However, the Galatama later banned foreign players following the 1984 Galatama with this ban lasting an entire decade and prematurely ending Matos' career.

== Later life ==
In 1988, Matos returned to Indonesia with his wife and two children with his son Jaino Matos also becoming a footballer like his father. Jairo also opened a footballing academy throughout the 1990s, also briefly managing PSMS Medan in 1997.
