= Alex Dusay =

Indonesian footballer (born 1999)

Personal information
- Full name: Marthin Alessandro Dusay
- Date of birth: 16 February 1999 (age 27)
- Place of birth: Jayapura, Indonesia
- Height: 1.76 m (5 ft 9 in)
- Position: Centre-back

Team information
- Current team: Persipura Jayapura
- Number: 16

Youth career
- 2018–2019: Persipura Jayapura
- 2020–2021: PON Papua

Senior career*
Years	Team	Apps	(Gls)
2021	Persewar Waropen	5	(0)
2022	PSS Sleman	2	(0)
2022–2023	Persipura Jayapura	2	(0)
2023	Persewar Waropen	17	(0)
2024–	Persipura Jayapura	47	(0)
- * Club domestic league appearances and goals as of 2 October 2026

Marthin Alessandro Dusay (born 16 February 1999), commonly known as Alex Dusay, is an Indonesian professional footballer who plays as a centre-back for Liga 2 club Persipura Jayapura.

== Club career ==
=== Persewar Waropen ===
In 2021, Dusay signed a contract with Indonesian Liga 2 club Persewar Waropen. He made his league debut on 10 November 2021 in a match against Kalteng Putra at the Batakan Stadium, Balikpapan.

=== PSS Sleman ===
He was signed for PSS Sleman to play in Liga 1 in the 2021 season. Dusay made his league debut on 2 January 2022 in a match against Persik Kediri at the Kapten I Wayan Dipta Stadium, Gianyar.

== Career statistics ==
=== Club ===
As of 2 October 2026

Club	Season	League			Domestic Cup		Other		Total	
Club	Season	Division	Apps	Goals	Apps	Goals	Apps	Goals	Apps	Goals
Persewar Waropen	2021	Liga 2	5	0	0	0	0	0	5	0
PSS Sleman	2021	Liga 1	2	0	0	0	0	0	2	0
Persipura Jayapura	2022–23	Liga 2	2	0	0	0	0	0	2	0
Persewar Waropen	2023–24	Liga 2	17	0	0	0	0	0	17	0
Persipura Jayapura	2024–25	Liga 2	21	0	0	0	0	0	21	0
Persipura Jayapura	2025–26	Championship	22	0	0	0	0	0	22	0
Persipura Jayapura	2026–27	Championship	4	0	0	0	0	0	4	0
Career total			74	0	0	0	0	0	74	0
