= Maman Abdurahman =

Maman Abdurahman may refer to:

- Maman Abdurahman (footballer)
- Maman Abdurrahman (politician)
