= Jafri Sastra =

Indonesian association football manager

Personal information
- Full name: Jafri Sastra
- Date of birth: 23 May 1965 (age 61)
- Place of birth: Padang, Indonesia

Managerial career
- Years: Team
- 2012–2015: Semen Padang
- 2015–2016: Mitra Kukar
- 2016: Persipura Jayapura
- 2016–2017: Mitra Kukar
- 2017: Celebest
- 2018: PSPS Riau
- 2018: Persis Solo
- 2018–2019: PSIS Semarang
- 2019: PSMS Medan
- 2020–2021: Mitra Kukar
- 2021: Muba Babel United
- 2021: PSPS Riau
- 2021–2022: Persela Lamongan
- 2022–2023: Bekasi City
- 2023: Kalteng Putra
- 2023–2024: PSKC Cimahi
- 2024: Sriwijaya
- 2025–2026: PSIS Semarang

Jafri Sastra (born 23 May 1965) is an Indonesian football manager. Previously he had spells as manager of Semen Padang, Mitra Kukar, Persipura, Celebest, PSPS Riau, and Persis Solo.

== Honours ==
=== Manager ===
Semen Padang

- Indonesian Community Shield: 2013

Mitra Kukar

- General Sudirman Cup: 2015
