= Toshihiko Shiozawa =

Japanese football manager

Personal information
- Full name: Shiozawa Toshihiko (塩澤 敏彦)
- Date of birth: 8 March 1947 (age 79)
- Place of birth: Hiroshima, Japan

Youth career
- 1966–1969: Meiji University

Senior career*
Years	Team	Apps	(Gls)
1970-1971	Nagoya Bank		
1971-1975	Eidai SC		

Managerial career
- 1976: Eidai SC
- 1984–1985: Meiji University
- 1986–1991: ANA Yokohama
- 2005–2006: Nepal
- * Club domestic league appearances and goals

Toshihiko Shiozawa (Japanese: 塩澤 敏彦) is a Japanese football manager and former footballer.

== Career ==
=== Footballer ===
Shiozawa first played club football at Meiji University, before professionally debuting in the Japan Soccer League in 1970 for Nagoya Bank. Following the closure of the club at the end of the 1971 season, Shiozawa transferred to Eidai Sangyo where he played until 1975. During this time, he also acted as assistant coach to Ken Okubo.

=== Coach ===
Immediately after retiring from playing in 1975, Shiozawa replaced Okubo as head coach for Eidai SC. His tenure there did not last long, however, as after only one year, the club closed down. Shiozawa then took an eight-year hiatus from soccer, before returning to coach the football club at Meiji University. In 1986, he began coaching ANA Yokohama, which had just been promoted to the first division of the Japan Soccer League. Within three years, Shiozawa was able to lead the team to the top position of the league, getting a second and a third place in 1989 and 1990. respectively. In 1991 Shiozawa announced he would be retiring from soccer. He briefly returned in December 2005 and January 2006, as coach of the Nepal national football team.

== Honours ==
- Japan Soccer League Division 2: (1) - 1987-88

== Bibliography ==
- The Complete History of Japan Soccer League, 1965-1992 (日本 サッカー リーグ 全 史 1965-1992), 1993 CiNii entry
- 1989-1990 JSL Year Book, 1989 NAN'UN-DO Publishing
- Shu Kamo, 「モダン サッカー へ の 挑戦」 ISBN 978-4062635134
