= Luciano Leandro =

Brazilian football manager

Personal information
- Full name: Luciano Gomes Leandro
- Date of birth: 1 February 1966 (age 60)
- Place of birth: Brazil
- Position: Midfielder

Senior career*
Years	Team	Apps	(Gls)
- Goytacaz
- Macaé
- Valerio
–1995	Bangu		
1995–2000	PSM Makassar		
2001–2004	Persija Jakarta		

Managerial career
- 2007: Persma Manado
- 2008: Macaé
- 2008–2009: PSMS Medan
- 2010: Goytacaz
- 2013: Serra Macaense
- 2016: PSM Makassar
- 2017: Macaé
- 2019: Persipura Jayapura
- * Club domestic league appearances and goals

Luciano Gomes Leandro (born 1 February 1966 in Brazil) is a Brazilian professional football manager and former player.

== Career ==
Leandro started enjoying football after seeing his brother become a professional footballer.

Despite being told that he was signing for a Malaysian team, Leandro arrived in Indonesia in 1995, where he chose to play for PSM Makassar. One of the factors which caused him to stay in Indonesia were the beaches, which he enjoyed.

After retiring, he opened a hotel in Brazil named the Hotel Makassar, which serves Makassar specialties inside its restaurant.
