= Legimin Raharjo =

Indonesian footballer

Personal information
- Full name: Legimin Raharjo
- Date of birth: 10 May 1981 (age 45)
- Place of birth: Medan, Indonesia
- Height: 1.72 m (5 ft 8 in)
- Position: Midfielder

Youth career
- 1993: SSB Ceria
- 1995–1997: Medan Jaya Junior
- 1998–1999: PPLP Medan

Senior career*
Years	Team	Apps	(Gls)
2000–2001	PS Langkat	8	(0)
2001–2003	PS Batam	12	(1)
2003–2008	PSMS Medan	68	(9)
2008–2010	Persik Kediri	32	(4)
2011–2013	Arema Indonesia (IPL)	28	(3)
2013–2014	Gresik United	16	(0)
2014–2015	Pelita Bandung Raya	2	(0)
2015–2016	PSMS Medan	17	(3)
2016	PS TNI	28	(2)
2016–2020	PSMS Medan	76	(5)
Total		287	(27)

International career
2008	Indonesia	1	(0)

Managerial career
- 2013: Bintang Jaya Asahan
- 2021–: PSMS Medan (assistant)
- * Club domestic league appearances and goals

Legimin Raharjo (born 10 May 1981 in Medan, North Sumatra) is an Indonesian former professional footballer who played as a midfielder. People often called him by his nickname Gimin. He took part in the national team during the 2007 Asian Cup. His footballing influence is Paul Scholes and his favourite club is Manchester United.

== Honours ==
PSMS Medan

- Bang Yos Gold Cup: 2004, 2005, 2006
- Piala Kemerdekaan: 2015
- Liga Indonesia Premier Division runner up: 2007–08
- Liga 2 runner-up: 2017
