= Persipura Jayapura =

Association football team in Indonesia

- Full name: Persatuan Sepakbola Indonesia Jayapura
- Nickname: Mutiara Hitam (The Black Pearl)
- Short name: PSPR; PSP; JAY
- Founded: 25 May 1963; 63 years ago
- Ground: Mandala Stadium; Lukas Enembe Stadium
- Capacity: 30,000; 40,263
- Owner: PT Persipura Jayapura
- Chairman: Benhur Tomi Mano
- Coach: Regi Aditya
- League: Championship
- 2025–26: Promotion play-off loser
- Website: https://Persipura.id/
Home colours	Away colours

Persatuan Sepakbola Indonesia Jayapura, commonly known as Persipura, is an Indonesian professional football club based in Jayapura, Papua. The club was founded in 1963 and currently competes in the Championship.

One of the giants of modern football in Indonesia, Persipura has won numerous league and cup titles. The club is known for having a distinct playing style, which often showcases the individual abilities of players. Persipura is also known for producing great players from Papua such as Rully Nere, Jack Komboy, Eduard Ivakdalam, Boaz Solossa, Ian Louis Kabes, Imanuel Wanggai, and Titus Bonai.

== History ==
=== Foundation and early years (1963–1994) ===
Persipura's history is mysterious. The club's administrators cannot fully prove that the club was founded in 1963, since there is also evidence that suggests the club might have been founded in 1965, 1962, or even 1950. Other than that, the administrators also are not fully sure of Persipura's original name.

The early years were not filled with a lot of achievements. They only managed to win the Perserikatan First Division two times in 1979 and 1993. Other than that, they were runners-up in the 1980 Perserikatan season. In the final match of that season which took place on 31 August at Senayan Stadium, they lost to Persiraja Banda Aceh 3–1. The goalscorers were Leo Kapisa on 15th minute for Persipura, Rustam Syafari ('45), and Bustamam ('55, '81) for Persiraja.

=== Modern era and recent history (1994–present) ===
==== Liga Indonesia (1994–2007) ====
Their first achievement in the modern era was winning the 2005 Liga Indonesia Premier Division under coach Rahmad Darmawan. PT. Persipura Papua was established to fulfill the requirement to compete in the Indonesia Super League.

==== Indonesian Super League (2008–2015) ====
Persipura dominated Indonesian football under the control of Brazilian coach Jacksen F. Tiago by winning the Indonesia Super League (ISL, present: Liga 1) in 2009, 2011 and 2013. They also managed to finish as runners-up three times during ISL era. When PSSI was under FIFA sanctions, Indonesia Soccer Championship was held in 2016 which the team came out as champions.

==== Liga 1 (2017–2022) ====
Persipura endured difficult challenges in 2021–22 season which saw two senior figures Boaz Solossa and Tinus Pae were fired from the club due to disciplinary reasons, but the latter was signed back in mid-season. It also had its points deducted by 3 points after failing to appear in a match against Madura United F.C. on 21 February 2022. Eventually, after disappointing results all season, Persipura was relegated which ended its 29-year spell on the highest level of Indonesian football league. The team won its last match of the season against Persita Tangerang 3–0 on 31 March 2022, but it wasn't enough as PS Barito Putera, which had had 2 points advantage prior to the final matchday, drew 1–1 against Persib Bandung. Barito finished above Persipura although having the same points due to head-to-head rule.

=== Continental Competitions ===
On many occasions, Persipura played in AFC Cup and AFC Champions League, which began from 2010 AFC Champions League group stage. They drew against Jeonbuk Hyundai Motors, Changchun Yatai F.C. and Kashima Antlers, which saw them finished bottom of the group with only one win against Changchun Yatai. In the following year, Persipura debuted in AFC Cup and advanced to the quarterfinals where they were beaten by an Iraqi team Erbil SC. In 2012, Persipura failed to qualify for 2012 AFC Champions League group stage, lost to Adelaide United FC in play-off. In 2014, Persipura qualified again for AFC Cup, topped the group stage where they played against Churchill Brothers S.C., Home United, and New Radiant S.C. In Round of 16, they won against Yangon United F.C. 9-2 where Boakay Eddie Foday scored 5 goals. They also beat Kuwait SC in the quarter-final and advanced to the semifinals to play against Qadsia SC. However, Persipura was beaten by the Kuwaiti team 10–2 on aggregate. Persipura qualified for AFC Cup the third time in 2015 after finishing as runner-ups of 2014 Indonesia Super League. The group stage saw them finished first among Bengaluru FC, Maziya, and Warriors FC. In Round of 16, they were about to play against Pahang FA, but the Malaysian team could not attend the match due to visa reasons and the match was deemed a walkover. Eventually, Persipura's campaign ended when FIFA sanctioned PSSI which was intervened by Indonesian government, thus all football activities in Indonesia were suspended.

Persipura was scheduled to compete in 2021 AFC Cup, but the competition itself was cancelled due to COVID-19 pandemic.

==== Persipura Jayapura squad during their championship season ====
The usual starting line-up
2005 season	2008–09 season	2010–11 season	2013 season

=== Relegation ===
in the 2021–22 season, Persipura were relegated due to the many defeats they experienced at the start of the season. Persipura finally started to improve after sacking coach Jacksen F. Tiago and replacing him with his former Argentina coach Angel Alfredo Vera. But unfortunately it was too late, Persipura finally had to be relegated from Liga 1 after finishing dramatically in 16th position out of 18 clubs.

Previously, Persipura only competed in the Perserikatan Premier Division (Second Division), after being relegated in 1989. They only got promoted again in 1993 after winning the Perserikatan Premier Division and then had to be relegated back to Liga 2 (Second Division), after 28 years of competing and making great history in Indonesia's top football competition.

== Stadium ==
Mandala Stadium
Persipura uses Mandala Stadium, located on Dock V Jayapura facing Humboldt Bay, as their home ground.

Lukas Enembe Stadium
Persipura used to always use the Mandala Stadium as their home and To compete in Liga 2 for the 2022–2023 season, Persipura received permission from the Governor of Papua Province, Lukas Enembe to use the biggest stadium in Papua which is Lukas Enembe Stadium along with the training field next to the main stadium. And also the archery athlete's guesthouse beside the main stadium is used by Persipura players to live in while doing training camps by also getting Gym and other facilities as well.

== Supporters ==
Their supporters are called Persipura Mania. They also have hardline fans or ultras namely Ultras BCN1963, Black Danger Community, The Karakas, and The Comen's.

== Sponsorship ==
- Bank Papua
- PT. Freeport Indonesia

== Kit supplier ==
- Adidas (1995–1998)
- Reebok (1999–2000)
- Nike (2001)
- Umbro (2002–2004)
- Specs (2005–2006) (2010–2025)
- In-House (2007–2008)
- Multi Sport (2007–2008)
- Lotto (2009–2010)
- Cendrawasih Karsa (2025–present)

== Coaches ==
Year	Manager
2003	(Indonesia) Rudy William Keltjes
2004	(Indonesia) Suharno
2005	**(Indonesia) Rahmad Darmawan**
2006	(Brazil) Toni Netto
2006	(Indonesia) Mettu Duaramuri
2007	(Bulgaria) Ivan Kolev
2007	(Malaysia) Irfan Bakti Abu Salim
2007–08	(Malaysia) Raja Isa
2008–14	**(Brazil) Jacksen F. Tiago**
2015–16	(Brazil) Osvaldo Lessa
2016–17	**(Argentina) Alfredo Vera**
2017	(Indonesia) Liestiadi
2017	(Brazil) Wanderley da Silva
2018	(England) Peter Butler
2018	(Brazil) Amilton Silva
2018	(Brazil) Osvaldo Lessa
2019	(Brazil) Luciano Leandro
2019–21	(Brazil) Jacksen F. Tiago
2021–22	(Argentina) Alfredo Vera
2022–23	(Indonesia) Ricky Nelson
2023	(Indonesia) Tony Ho
2023–2025	(Indonesia) Ricardo Salampessy
2025–2026	(Indonesia) Rahmad Darmawan
2026	(Indonesia) Andri Ramawi Putra
2026–	(Indonesia) Regi Aditya

The coach whose name is in bold is the one who brings the champion.

== Personnel ==
As of 14 November 2026

=== Coaching staff ===
Position	Name
Head coach	(Indonesia) Regi Aditya
Assistant coaches	(Indonesia) Dadan Sukmana
Assistant coaches	(Indonesia) Izaac Wanggai
Goalkeeping coach	(Indonesia) Agung Prasetyo
Fitness coaches	(Indonesia) Achmad Sapei
Fitness coaches	(Indonesia) Elsa Pramudya
Analyst	(Indonesia) Ronald Innova
Team doctor	(Indonesia) Benny Suripatty
Masseur	(Indonesia) Kali Kalbar
Masseur	(Indonesia) Yulianto
Physiotherapist	(Indonesia) Dian Efrianto

=== Management ===
Position	Name
Chairman	(Indonesia) Benhur Tomi Mano
President director	(Indonesia) Owen Rahadiyan
Director of football	(Argentina) Ángel Alfredo Vera
Deputy director of football	(Argentina) Esteban Horacio Busto
Team manager	(Indonesia) Eveline Injaya
Assistant team manager	(Indonesia) Jack Komboy
Secretary	(Indonesia) Winston Injaya
Media officer	(Indonesia) Syaiful Paembonan

== Players ==
=== Current squad ===
As of August 2026

Note: Flags indicate national team as defined under FIFA eligibility rules; some limited exceptions apply. Players may hold more than one non-FIFA nationality.

No.	Pos.	Nation	Player
2	DF	IDN	Michael Kambu
3	DF	IDN	Tonci Ramandei
4	DF	BRA	Ricardo Lima
5	DF	IDN	Sukandar Kansai
6	FW	IDN	Yeter Amohoso
7	MF	IDN	Reno Salampessy
8	MF	JPN	Takuya Matsunaga
11	FW	IDN	Ricky Cawor
12	MF	IDN	Rafael Sunuk
13	MF	IDN	Ian Kabes (vice-captain)
14	DF	IDN	Ruben Sanadi
16	DF	IDN	Alex Dusay
17	FW	IDN	Feri Pahabol
18	MF	IDN	Beton Kogoya
20	MF	IDN	Elisa Basna
21	DF	IDN	Tinus Pae
23	FW	IDN	Ramai Rumakiek
24	DF	IDN	Febrianto Uopmabin

No.	Pos.	Nation	Player
26	DF	IDN	Agus Rumboirusi
27	GK	IDN	Rendy Oscario
28	DF	IDN	Israel Wamiau
33	MF	IDN	Gunansar Mandowen
35	GK	IDN	Andika Wisnu
36	GK	IDN	Adzib Al Hakim
43	DF	IDN	Febrianto Uopmabin
44	MF	IDN	Bima Ragil
46	MF	IDN	Todd Ferre
47	MF	IDN	Gelfias Waicang
74	DF	IDN	Alfrado Wayeni
78	MF	IDN	Pilipus Sibetai
79	FW	IDN	Lazarus Sinim
82	FW	IDN	Jeam Kelly Sroyer
86	FW	IDN	Boaz Solossa (captain)
97	FW	BRA	Alexsandro
99	GK	IDN	Yeremia Meraudje

== Season-by-season records ==
Season	Liga Indonesia									Piala Indonesia	AFC Cup	AFC Champions League	Top scorers	
Season	Division	P	W	D	L	GF	GA	Pts	Pos	Piala Indonesia	AFC Cup	AFC Champions League	Name	Goal
1994–95	Premier (East)	32	13	9	10	22	40	42	8th	—	—	—	—N/a	—N/a
1995–96	Premier (East)	30	14	7	9	47	32	48	5th	—	—	—	(Indonesia) Chris Yarangga	20
1995–96	(2S Group C)	3	2	0	1	6	2	6	2nd	—	—	—	(Indonesia) Chris Yarangga	20
1995–96	(KO)^{1}	1	0	0	1	3	4	0	3rd	—	—	—	(Indonesia) Chris Yarangga	20
1996–97	Premier (East)	20	11	2	7	31	22	35	4th	—	—	—	—N/a	—N/a
1996–97	(2S Group C)	3	0	0	3	3	6	0	4th	—	—	—	—N/a	—N/a
1997–98	Premier (East)	16	4	6	6	24	23	18	7th	—	—	—	—N/a	—N/a
1998–99	Premier (East)	10	3	3	4	15	16	12	5th	—	—	—		
1999–2000	Premier (East)	26	11	7	8	37	24	40	5th	—	—	—		
2001	Premier (East)	25	10	2	13	30	27	32	8th	—	—	—	(Indonesia) Chris Yarangga	9
2002	Premier (East)	22	10	4	8	43	25	34	3rd	—	—	—	(Indonesia) Eduard Ivakdalam	14
2002	(2S Group A)	3	1	0	2	3	2	3	3rd	—	—	—	(Indonesia) Eduard Ivakdalam	14
2003	Premier	38	17	7	14	66	51	58	5th	—	—	—	(Indonesia) Jimmy Suparno	14
2004	Premier	34	11	10	13	39	43	43	13th	—	—	—	(Brazil) David da Rocha	8
2005	Premier (East)	26	14	4	8	31	17	46	1st	Round of 16	—	—	(Indonesia) Eduard Ivakdalam	8
2005	(2S Group B)	3	3	0	0	3	0	9	1st	Round of 16	—	—	(Indonesia) Eduard Ivakdalam	8
2005	(KO)^{4}	1	1	0	0	3	2		1st	Round of 16	—	—	(Indonesia) Eduard Ivakdalam	8
2006	Premier (East)	26	9	8	9	27	23	35	8th	2nd	—	—	(Chile) Cristian Carrasco	12
2007–08	Premier (East)	34	19	7	8	54	24	64	1st	2nd	—	—	(Brazil) Alberto Gonçalves	20
2007–08	(2S Group B)	3	2	1	0	8	1	7	1st	2nd	—	—	(Brazil) Alberto Gonçalves	20
2007–08	(KO)^{4}	1	0	1	0	0	0		3rd	2nd	—	—	(Brazil) Alberto Gonçalves	20
2008–09	ISL	34	25	5	4	81	25	80	1st	2nd	—	—	(Indonesia) Boaz Solossa	28
2009–10	ISL	34	18	13	3	62	32	67	2nd	4th	—	Group Stage	(Brazil) Alberto Gonçalves	18
2010–11	ISL	28	17	9	2	63	23	60	1st	—	Quarter-final	—	(Indonesia) Boaz Solossa	22
2011–12	ISL	34	20	8	6	65	35	68	2nd	—	—	Qualifying Play-off	(Indonesia) (Brazil) Alberto Gonçalves	25
2013	ISL	34	25	7	2	82	18	82	1st	—	—	—	(Indonesia) Boaz Solossa	25
2014	ISL (East)	20	10	9	1	29	15	39	2nd	—	Semi-final	—	(Indonesia) Boaz Solossa	11
2014	(2S Group A)	6	4	0	2	9	6	12	1st	—	Semi-final	—	(Indonesia) Boaz Solossa	11
2014	(KO)^{4}	2	1	1	0	4	2		2nd	—	Semi-final	—	(Indonesia) Boaz Solossa	11
2015	ISL^{5}													
2016	ISC A^{6}	34	20	8	6	53	27	68	1st	—	—	—		
2017	Liga 1	34	17	9	8	64	37	60	5th	—	—	—	(Brazil) Addison Alves	15
2018	Liga 1	34	12	8	14	49	46	44	12th	—	—	—	(Indonesia) Boaz Solossa	11
2019	Liga 1	34	14	11	9	47	38	53	3rd	Round of 32	—	—	(Indonesia) Titus Bonai	11
2020	Liga 1													
2021–22	Liga 1	34	10	9	15	36	47	36	16th	—	—	—	(Indonesia) Feri Pahabol	9
2022–23	Liga 2													
2023–24	Liga 2 (Group 4 in regular round)	12	3	5	4	15	17	14	4th	—	—	—	(Indonesia) Ramai Rumakiek	10
2023–24	(Group D in Relegation round)	6	3	2	1	6	4	11	1st	—	—	—	(Indonesia) Ramai Rumakiek	10
2024–25	Liga 2 (Group 3 in regular round)	14	7	2	5	25	14	23	3rd	—	—	—	(Indonesia) Ramai Rumakiek	22
2024–25	(Group K in Relegation round)	8	4	2	2	18	4	14	3rd	—	—	—	(Indonesia) Ramai Rumakiek	22
2024–25	(Relegation playoff)	1	1	0	0	2	1	–	PO Winners	—	—	—	(Indonesia) Ramai Rumakiek	22
2025–26	Championship (Group 2 in regular round)	27	17	5	5	44	17	56	2nd	—	—	—	(Brazil) Matheus Silva	11
2025–26	(Promotion playoff)	1	0	0	1	0	1	–	PO Losers	—	—	—	(Brazil) Matheus Silva	11
2026–27	Championship (Group 2)	0		0	0	0	0	0	TBD	—	—	—	TBD	0

Champion Runners-up 3rd place Promoted Relegated

QR Qualification Round NP Not Participated

Note:
^13rd position with Pupuk Kaltim. Knockout rounds are only statistics, not counting points.
^2 PS Barito Putera did not take part in the league
^3 Knockout rounds are only statistics, not counting points.
^4 Knockout rounds are only statistics, not counting points.
^5 League was suspended.
^6 Indonesia Soccer Championship A is an unofficial competition replacing Indonesia Super League which was suspended.

== Player records ==
=== All time topscorer ===
As of 10 August 2020

Year	Player	Caps	Goals	Ratio
2005–2021	(Indonesia) **Boaz Solossa**	359	225	0.62
2005–**present**	(Indonesia) Ian Louis Kabes	335	44	0.13
2009–2010, 2011–2012	(Brazil) (Indonesia) Beto Goncalves	66	43	0.65
2010–2014	(Liberia) Zah Rahan Krangar	80	24	0.30
1994–2010	(Indonesia) Eduard Ivakdalam	218	21	0.9
2007–2009	(Nigeria) Ernest Jeremiah	32	20	0.62

== Asian clubs ranking ==
As of 30 November 2024.

Current Rank	Country	Team	Points
71	(South Korea)	Jeju United FC	1380
72	(Indonesia)	Borneo F.C. Samarinda	1379
73	(Indonesia)	**Persipura Jayapura**	1376
74	(Australia)	Sydney FC	1376
75	(India)	Salgaocar FC	1372

== Honours ==
Type	Format	Competition	Titles	Seasons
**Domestic**	**Liga Indonesia Premier Division/Indonesia Soccer Championship A/Super League**	**Top Tier Division**	**5**	2005, 2008–09, 2010–11, 2013, 2016
**Domestic**	**Piala Presiden Soeharto/Piala Keraton II/Inter Island Cup**	**Domestic Cup Competitions**	**3**	1976, 2009, 2011
**Domestic**	**Indonesian Community Shield**	**Community Shield**	1	2009

=== Other Achievements ===
Domestic Cup Competitions

- **Piala Indonesia**
  - Runners-up (3): 2006, 2007–08, 2008–09

Continental

- **AFC Champions League Elite**
  - Group stage (1): 2010
- **AFC Champions League Two**
  - Semi-finals (1): 2014

Friendly Tournament

- **South Vietnam Independence Cup**
  - Runners-up (1): 1974
- **SCTV Cup**
  - Winners (1): 2011

== Performances in AFC club competitions ==
Season	Competition	Round	Club	Home	Away
2010	AFC Champions League	Group stage	(South Korea) Jeonbuk Hyundai Motors	1–4	0–8
2010	AFC Champions League	Group stage	(China) Changchun Yatai	2–0	0–9
2010	AFC Champions League	Group stage	(Japan) Kashima Antlers	1–3	0–5
2011	AFC Cup	Group stage	(Hong Kong) South China	4–2	1–1
2011	AFC Cup	Group stage	(India) East Bengal	4–1	1–1
2011	AFC Cup	Group stage	(Thailand) Chonburi	3–0	1–4
2011	AFC Cup	Round of 16	(Vietnam) Song Lam Nghe An	–	3–1
2011	AFC Cup	Quarter-final	(Iraq) Erbil	1–2	0–1
2012	AFC Champions League	Play-off round	(Australia) Adelaide United	–	0–3
2014	AFC Cup	Group stage	(India) Churchill Brothers	2–0	0–0
2014	AFC Cup	Group stage	(Singapore) Home United	0–2	1–1
2014	AFC Cup	Group stage	(Maldives) New Radiant	3–0	2–0
2014	AFC Cup	Round of 16	(Myanmar) Yangon United	9–2	–
2014	AFC Cup	Quarter-final	Al-Kuwait	6–1	2–3
2014	AFC Cup	Semi-final	(Kuwait) Al-Qadsia	0–6	2–4
2015	AFC Cup	Group stage	(Maldives) Maziya	0–0	2–1
2015	AFC Cup	Group stage	(Singapore) Warriors	6–0	3–1
2015	AFC Cup	Group stage	(India) Bengaluru	3–1	3–1
2015	AFC Cup	Round of 16	(Malaysia) Pahang	0–3 W/O	–
2021	AFC Cup	Group stage	(Malaysia) Kedah	Cancelled	
2021	AFC Cup	Group stage	(Singapore) Lion City Sailors	Cancelled	
2021	AFC Cup	Group stage	(Vietnam) Saigon	Cancelled	

== See also ==
- List of football clubs in Indonesia
- Indonesian football league system
