= List of Indonesian football champions =

- Founded: 1930
- Country: Indonesia
- Confederation: AFC
- Number of clubs: 18
- Current champions: Persib Bandung (10th title) (2025–26)
- Most championships: Persija Jakarta (11 titles)
- Current: 2026–27 Super League

The Indonesian football champions are the winners of the highest league of Indonesian men's football, which since 2025–26 is the Super League.

Perserikatan, an amateur inter-cities competition, was first established under auspices of the Football Association of Indonesia (PSSI) in 1930. From Indonesia's independence in August 1945 until the establishment of the semi-professional Galatama, Perserikatan was the premier club football competition in the country. Perserikatan and Galatama ran in parallel until it was merged to form Liga Indonesia, the first professional football league in Indonesia, in 1994. The structure remained until the Indonesia Super League was established in 2008.

A PSSI internal dispute led into the creation of Indonesian Premier League in 2011, and it ran in parallel with the Super League for two seasons. The Super League became the top-flight league once again in 2013, but was prematurely ended in May 2015 following Indonesian government's ban on PSSI activities, which subsequently led to the suspension of PSSI from FIFA membership. The top-flight league changed to Liga 1 in 2017, but reverted to Super League in 2025.

This list includes but does not count the champion of Indonesia Soccer Championship A (ISC A), a football league that existed amid FIFA sanctions over PSSI between April and December 2016, and does not include the champion of Liga Primer Indonesia, a short-lived, not officially recognized independent football league that existed between September 2010 and April 2011, which was subsequently merged into the Premier League.

== List of champions ==
=== Amateur and semi-professional era (pre-1994) ===
==== Inlandsche Stedenwedstrĳden (1930–1943) ====
Season	Champions	Runners-up
1930 (Note: The 1930 season was an unofficial tournament.)	VIJ Jakarta	SIVB Surabaya
1931	VIJ Jakarta	PSIM Yogyakarta
1932	PSIM Yogyakarta	VIJ Jakarta
1932–33	VIJ Jakarta	PSIB Bandung
1933–34 (Note: The PSSI 50th anniversary book erroneously lists the venue of the tournament as Bandung and its runners-up as Persib.)	VIJ Jakarta	Persis Solo
1934–35	Persis Solo	PPVIM Meester Cornelis
1935–36	Persis Solo	Persib Bandung
1936–37	Persib Bandung	Persis Solo
1937–38	VIJ Jakarta	Persibaya Surabaya
1938–39	Persis Solo	PSIM Yogyakarta
1939–40	Persis Solo	PSIM Yogyakarta
1940–41	Persis Solo	Persibaya Surabaya
1941–43 (Note: Per Arsip Sepak Bola Indonesia. RSSSF claims this season was split into the 1941–42 and 1942–43 seasons when Persis was the champion on both while Persibaya was the runner-up in 1941–42 and PSIM in 1942–43.)	PSIM Yogyakarta	Persis Solo

==== Perserikatan (1950–1994) ====
Season	Champions	Runners-up	Top scorer (club, goals)	Winning manager
1950 (Note: The 1950 season was an unofficial tournament. RSSSF claims this season was the last in the Dutch East Indies era.)	Persib Bandung	Persibaya Surabaya		
1951	Persibaya Surabaya	PSM Makassar		
1952	Persibaya Surabaya	Persija Jakarta		
1953–54	Persija Jakarta	PSMS Medan		
1955–57	PSM Makassar	PSMS Medan	(Indonesia) Andi Ramang (PSM Makassar, 14)	
1957–59	PSM Makassar	Persib Bandung	(Indonesia) Suwardi Arland (PSM Makassar, 11)	
1959–61	Persib Bandung	PSM Makassar	(Indonesia) Wowo Sunaryo (Persib Bandung)	(Indonesia) Cornellis Tomasowa
1962–64	Persija Jakarta	PSM Makassar	(Indonesia) Soetjipto Soentoro (Persija Jakarta, 16)	(Indonesia) Endang Witarsa
1964–65	PSM Makassar	Persebaya Surabaya		(Indonesia) Suwardi Arland
1965–66	PSM Makassar	Persib Bandung		(Indonesia) Ernest Mangindaan
1966–67	PSMS Medan	Persib Bandung		(Indonesia) Jusuf Siregar
1967–69 (Note: Per some sources but it is not listed in the PSSI 50th anniversary book. RSSSF claims this season was not held.)	PSMS Medan	Persija Jakarta		
1969–71	PSMS Medan	Persebaya Surabaya	(Indonesia) Abdul Kadir (Persebaya Surabaya)	(Indonesia) Zulkarnaen Nasution
1971–73	Persija Jakarta	Persebaya Surabaya	(Indonesia) Iswadi Idris (Persija Jakarta)	(Indonesia) Sinyo Aliandoe
1973–75	Persija Jakarta and PSMS Medan		(Indonesia) Kainun Waskito (Persebaya Surabaya)	(Indonesia) Sinyo Aliandoe (Indonesia) Zulkarnaen Nasution
1975–78	Persebaya Surabaya	Persija Jakarta	(Indonesia) Anwar Ramang (PSM Makassar, 14)	(Indonesia) J.A. Hattu
1978–79	Persija Jakarta	PSMS Medan	(Indonesia) Suwarno (PSMS Medan, 7)	(Poland) Marek Janota
1980	Persiraja Banda Aceh	Persipura Jayapura	(Indonesia) Leo Kapisa (Persipura Jayapura)	(Singapore) Andrew Yap (Indonesia) Yusuf Ohorella
1983	PSMS Medan	Persib Bandung	(Indonesia) Bustaman Ibrahim (Persiraja Banda Aceh)	(Indonesia) Parlin Siagian
1985	PSMS Medan	Persib Bandung	(Indonesia) Ajat Sudrajat (Persib Bandung, 15)	(Indonesia) Parlin Siagian
1986	Persib Bandung	Perseman Manokwari	(Indonesia) Adityo Dharmadi (Persija Jakarta, 10)	(Indonesia) Nandar Iskandar
1986–87	PSIS Semarang	Persebaya Surabaya		(Indonesia) Sartono Anwar
1987–88	Persebaya Surabaya	Persija Jakarta	(Indonesia) Syamsul Arifin (Persebaya Surabaya, 18)	(Indonesia) Kusmanhadi (Indonesia) Misbach
1989–90	Persib Bandung	Persebaya Surabaya		(Indonesia) Ade Dana
1991–92	PSM Makassar	PSMS Medan	(Indonesia) Suharto (PSMS Medan)	(Indonesia) Syamsuddin Umar
1993–94	Persib Bandung	PSM Makassar	(Indonesia) Agus Winarno (Persebaya Surabaya)	(Indonesia) Indra Thohir

==== Galatama (1979–1994) ====
Season	Champions	Runners-up	Top scorer (club, goals)	Winning manager
1979–80	Warna Agung	Jayakarta	Hadi Ismanto (Indonesia Muda, 22)	(Indonesia) Endang Witarsa
1980–82	Niac Mitra	Jayakarta	(Indonesia) Syamsul Arifin (Niac Mitra, 30)	(Indonesia) Muhammad Basri
1982–83	Niac Mitra	UMS 80	Dede Sulaeman (Indonesia Muda, 17)	(Indonesia) Muhammad Basri
1983–84	Yanita Utama	Mercu Buana	(Indonesia) Bambang Nurdiansyah (Mercu Buana, 16)	
1984	Yanita Utama	UMS 80	(Indonesia) Bambang Nurdiansyah (Yanita Utama, 13)	(Indonesia) Abdul Kadir
1985	Krama Yudha Tiga Berlian	Arseto	(Indonesia) Bambang Nurdiansyah (Tiga Berlian, 9)	(Indonesia) Abdul Kadir
1986–87	Krama Yudha Tiga Berlian	Pelita Jaya	(Indonesia) Ricky Yacobi (Arseto, 9)	(Indonesia) Abdul Kadir
1987–88	Niac Mitra	Pelita Jaya	(Indonesia) Nasrul Koto (Arseto, 16)	(Indonesia) Suharno
1988–89	Pelita Jaya	Niac Mitra	(Indonesia) Mecky Tata (Arema, 18) (Indonesia) Dadang Kurnia (Bandung Raya, 18)	(Indonesia) Benny Dollo
1990	Pelita Jaya	Krama Yudha Tiga Berlian	(Indonesia) Bambang Nurdiansyah (Pelita Jaya, 15)	(Indonesia) Benny Dollo
1990–92	Arseto	Pupuk Kaltim	(Indonesia) Singgih Pitono (Arema, 21)	(Indonesia) Dananjaya
1992–93	Arema	Pupuk Kaltim	(Indonesia) Singgih Pitono (Arema, 16)	(Indonesia) Gusnul Yakin
1993–94	Pelita Jaya	Gelora Dewata	(Indonesia) Ansyari Lubis (Pelita Jaya, 19)	(Socialist Federal Republic of Yugoslavia) Selimir Milošević

=== Professional era (1994–present) ===
==== Premier Division (1994–2008) ====
Before 2008 the highest level of professional football competition in Indonesia was the Premier Division. It used the combination format of double round-robin first round and single-elimination second round.

Season	Champions	Runners-up	Top scorer (club, goals)	Winning manager
1994–95	Persib Bandung	Petrokimia Putra	(Indonesia) Peri Sandria (Bandung Raya, 34)	(Indonesia) Indra Thohir
1995–96	Mastrans Bandung Raya	PSM Makassar	(Serbia) Dejan Gluscevic (Bandung Raya, 30)	(Netherlands) Henk Wullems
1996–97	Persebaya Surabaya	Bandung Raya	(Brazil) Jacksen F. Tiago (Persebaya Surabaya, 26)	(Indonesia) Rusdy Bahalwan
1997–98	Competition abandoned due to political and economic turmoil in Indonesia			
1998–99	PSIS Semarang	Persebaya Surabaya	(Gabon) Alain Mabenda (PSDS Deli Serdang, 11)	(Indonesia) Edy Paryono
1999–2000	PSM Makassar	Pupuk Kaltim	(Indonesia) Bambang Pamungkas (Persija Jakarta, 24)	(Indonesia) Syamsuddin Umar
2001	Persija Jakarta	PSM Makassar	(Cameroon) Sadissou Bako (Barito Putera, 22)	(Indonesia) Sofyan Hadi
2002	Petrokimia Putra	Persita Tangerang	(Indonesia) Ilham Jaya Kesuma (Persita Tangerang, 26)	(Moldova) Serghei Dubrovin
2003	Persik Kediri	PSM Makassar	(Chile) Oscar Aravena (PSM Makassar, 31)	(Indonesia) Jaya Hartono
2004	Persebaya Surabaya	PSM Makassar	(Indonesia) Ilham Jaya Kesuma (Persita Tangerang, 22)	(Brazil) Jacksen F. Tiago
2005	Persipura Jayapura	Persija Jakarta	(Uruguay) Cristian Gonzáles (Persik Kediri, 25)	(Indonesia) Rahmad Darmawan
2006	Persik Kediri	PSIS Semarang	(Uruguay) Cristian Gonzáles (Persik Kediri, 29)	(Indonesia) Daniel Roekito
2007–08	Sriwijaya	PSMS Medan	(Uruguay) Cristian Gonzáles (Persik Kediri, 32)	(Indonesia) Rahmad Darmawan

==== Indonesia Super League (ISL) (2008–2015) ====
Season	Champions	Runners-up	Top scorer (club, goals)	Winning manager
2008–09	Persipura Jayapura	Persiwa Wamena	(Indonesia) Boaz Solossa (Persipura Jayapura, 28) (Uruguay) Cristian Gonzáles (Persik/Persib, 28)	(Brazil) Jacksen F. Tiago
2009–10	Arema Indonesia	Persipura Jayapura	(Paraguay) Aldo Barreto (Bontang FC, 19)	(Netherlands) Robert Alberts
2010–11	Persipura Jayapura	Arema Indonesia	(Indonesia) Boaz Solossa (Persipura Jayapura, 22)	(Brazil) Jacksen F. Tiago
2011–12	Sriwijaya	Persipura Jayapura	(Brazil) Alberto Gonçalves (Persipura Jayapura, 25)	(Indonesia) Kas Hartadi
2013	Persipura Jayapura	Arema Indonesia	(Indonesia) Boaz Solossa (Persipura Jayapura, 25)	(Brazil) Jacksen F. Tiago
2014	Persib Bandung	Persipura Jayapura	(Cameroon) Emmanuel Kenmogne (Bhayangkara, 25)	(Indonesia) Djadjang Nurdjaman
2015	Competition abandoned due to conflict between PSSI and the Ministry of Youth and Sports, leading to PSSI's suspension by FIFA			

==== Indonesian Premier League (IPL) (2011–2013) ====
Season	Champions	Runners-up	Top scorer (club, goals)	Winning manager
2011–12	Semen Padang	Persebaya 1927	(Indonesia) Ferdinand Sinaga (Semen Padang, 15)	(Indonesia) Suhatman Imam
2013	Competition abandoned and merged with the Super League			

==== Liga 1 (2017–2025) ====
Season	Champions	Runners-up	Top scorer (club, goals)	Winning manager
2017	Bhayangkara	Bali United	(Netherlands) Sylvano Comvalius (Bali United, 37)	(Scotland) Simon McMenemy
2018	Persija Jakarta	PSM Makassar	(Serbia) Aleksandar Rakić (PS TIRA, 21)	(Brazil) Stefano Cugurra
2019	Bali United	Persebaya Surabaya	(Croatia) Marko Šimić (Persija Jakarta, 28)	(Brazil) Stefano Cugurra
2020	Competition declared void due to the COVID-19 pandemic			
2021–22	Bali United	Persib Bandung	(Indonesia) Ilija Spasojević (Bali United, 23)	(Brazil) Stefano Cugurra
2022–23	PSM Makassar	Persija Jakarta	(Brazil) Matheus Pato (Borneo Samarinda, 25)	(Portugal) Bernardo Tavares
2023–24	Persib Bandung	Madura United	(Brazil) David da Silva (Persib Bandung, 30)	(Croatia) Bojan Hodak
2024–25	Persib Bandung	Dewa United	(Brazil) Alex Martins (Dewa United, 26)	(Croatia) Bojan Hodak

==== Super League (2025–present) ====
Season	Champions	Runners-up	Top scorer (club, goals)	Winning manager
2025–26	Persib Bandung	Borneo Samarinda	(Brazil) David da Silva (Malut United, 23)	(Croatia) Bojan Hodak

== Other tournaments ==
Several tournaments were organized in the place of a top-flight football league during Indonesia's suspension from FIFA between December 2015 and May 2016. The winners are not officially recognized as Indonesian champion.

Competition	Champions	Runners-up	Top scorer (club, goals)	Winning manager
ISC A 2016	Persipura Jayapura	Arema Cronus	(Brazil) Alberto Gonçalves (Sriwijaya, 25)	(Argentina) Angel Alfredo Vera

== Total titles won ==
=== Super League era ===
Bold indicates current participating clubs. Italic indicates defunct clubs.

Club	Champions	Runners-up	Winning seasons	Runner-up seasons
**Persib Bandung**	4	1	2014, 2023–24, 2024–25, 2025–26	2021–22
Persipura Jayapura	3	3	2008–09, 2010–11, 2013	2009–10, 2011–12, 2014
**Bali United**	2	1	2019, 2021–22	2017
**Arema**	1	2	2009–10	2010–11, 2013
**Persija Jakarta**	1	1	2018	2022–23
**PSM Makassar**	1	1	2022–23	2018
Sriwijaya	1	–	2011–12	–
**Bhayangkara Presisi**	1	–	2017	–
Persiwa Wamena	–	1	–	2008–09
**Persebaya Surabaya**	–	1	–	2019
**Madura United**	–	1	–	2023–24
**Dewa United**	–	1	–	2024–25
**Borneo Samarinda**	–	1	–	2025–26

=== All professional era ===
Bold indicates current participating clubs in the Super League. Italic indicates defunct clubs.

Club	Champions	Runners-up	Winning seasons	Runner-up seasons
**Persib Bandung**	5	1	1994–95, 2014, 2023–24, 2024–25, 2025–26	2021–22
Persipura Jayapura	4	3	2005, 2008–09, 2010–11, 2013	2009–10, 2011–12 (ISL), 2014
**PSM Makassar**	2	5	1999–2000, 2022–23	1995–96, 2001, 2003, 2004, 2018
**Persebaya Surabaya**	2	3	1996–97, 2004	1998–99, 2011–12 (IPL), 2019
**Persija Jakarta**	2	2	2001, 2018	2005, 2022–23
**Bali United**	2	1	2019, 2021–22	2017
**Persik Kediri**	2	–	2003, 2006	–
Sriwijaya	2	–	2007–08, 2011–12 (ISL)	–
**Arema**	1	2	2009–10	2010–11, 2013
Bandung Raya	1	1	1995–96	1996–97
PSIS Semarang	1	1	1998–99	2006
Petrokimia Putra	1	1	2002	1994–95
Semen Padang	1	–	2011–12 (IPL)	–
**Bhayangkara Presisi**	1	–	2017	–
Pupuk Kaltim	–	1	–	1999–2000
**Persita Tangerang**	–	1	–	2002
PSMS Medan	–	1	–	2007–08
Persiwa Wamena	–	1	–	2008–09
**Madura United**	–	1	–	2023–24
**Dewa United**	–	1	–	2024–25
**Borneo Samarinda**	–	1	–	2025–26

=== All-time ===
Clubs in bold are competing in the 2026–27 Super League.

Rank	Club	Winners	Winning seasons
1	**Persija Jakarta**	11	1931, 1933, 1934, 1938, 1953–54, 1962–64, 1971–73, 1973–75, 1978–79, 2001, 2018
2	**Persib Bandung**	10	1937, 1959–61, 1986, 1989–90, 1993–94 (Perserikatan), 1994–95, 2014, 2023–24, 2024–25, 2025–26
3	**PSM Makassar**	7	1955–57, 1957–59, 1964–65, 1965–66, 1991–92, 1999–2000, 2022–23
4	PSMS Medan	6 (Note: Per some sources for PSMS in the 1967–69 season but it is not listed in the PSSI 50th anniversary book.)	1966–67, 1967–69, 1969–71, 1973–75, 1983, 1985 (Perserikatan)
4	**Persebaya Surabaya**	6	1951, 1952, 1975–78, 1987–88 (Perserikatan), 1996–97, 2004
6	Persis Solo	5 (Note: Officially four titles because ISC A is not an official competition.)	1935, 1936, 1939, 1940, 1941
6	Persipura Jayapura	5	2005, 2008–09, 2010–2011, 2013, 2016 (ISC A)
8	Niac Mitra	3	1980–82, 1982–83, 1987–88 (Galatama)
8	Pelita Jaya	3	1988–89, 1990, 1993–94 (Galatama)
10	**PSIM Yogyakarta**	2 (Note: Per Arsip Sepak Bola Indonesia for PSIM in the 1941–43 season. Some sources claim Sriwijaya won the 2011–12 Indonesia Super League and it is recognized as an official title.)	1932, 1943
10	Yanita Utama	2	1983–84, 1984
10	Krama Yudha Tiga Berlian	2	1985 (Galatama), 1986–87 (Galatama)
10	PSIS Semarang	2	1986–87 (Perserikatan), 1998–99
10	**Persik Kediri**	2	2003, 2006
10	**Arema**	2	1992–93, 2009–10
10	Sriwijaya	2	2007–08, 2011–12 (ISL)
10	**Bali United**	2	2009, 2021–22
18	Warna Agung	1 (Note: No title for Semen Padang if the FIFA official website claims Sriwijaya was the official champion in the 2011–12 season.)	1979–80
18	Persiraja Banda Aceh	1	1980
18	Arseto	1	1990–92
18	Bandung Raya	1	1995–96
18	Petrokimia Putra	1	2002
18	Semen Padang	1	2011–12 (IPL)
18	**Bhayangkara**	1	2017

== See also ==
- List of football clubs in Indonesia by major honours won
- Indonesian football league system
- Super League
- List of winners of the Championship and predecessors
- List of winners of the Liga Nusantara and predecessors
- List of winners of the Liga 4 and predecessors
- List of winners of the Liga Indonesia Third Division as the fifth tier

== Notes ==
Content notes

1. The name for Persija Jakarta until 1942.
2. formerly named Vorstenlandsche Voetbal Bond (VVB).
3. Yanita Utama also collapsed in 1985. The club was continued by Krama Yudha Tiga Berlian Palembang which finally disbanded in 1991.
4. In 2002 Pupuk Kaltim changed its name to PKT Bontang, and then in 2009 to Bontang FC.
5. They were not naturalized as an Indonesian citizens at that time.

Explanatory notes
