= Indonesian El Clásico =

Indonesian football derby

- Other names: Indonesian El Clásico (International); Indonesian derby (official); Klasika Indonesia (domestic)
- Location: Indonesia
- Teams: Persib; Persija
- First meeting: 1930; Inlandsche Stedenwedstrĳden
- Latest meeting: 12 September 2026; Super League; Persija 2–1 Persib
- Next meeting: 24 April 2027; Super League; Persib v Persija
- Stadiums: Gelora Bandung Lautan Api Stadium (Persib); Jakarta International Stadium (Persija)

Statistics
- Total meetings: 183
- Most wins: Persib Bandung (65)
- Most player appearances: Ismed Sofyan (18)
- Top scorer: Bambang Pamungkas (9)
- Largest victory: Persib 7–0 Persija; 1976 Yusuf Cup (10 August 1976)

Indonesian El Clásico (Indonesian: Klasika Indonesia) also known as the Indonesian Derby (Derbi Indonesia), is the name given to matches between the two biggest and most popular Indonesian football clubs Persib Bandung and Persija Jakarta. This derby is considered one of the biggest in Asia.

Persib Bandung is a football club as a symbol of pride for the people of Bandung or West Java and Persija Jakarta is a football club from Jakarta as the capital city of Indonesia. Their matches are highly anticipated by other football fans in Indonesia and the club has fans all over the country.

== History ==
=== 1930–1949 ===
In 1930, the Football Association of Indonesia (PSSI) was formed and one of its founders was Persib Bandung and Persija Jakarta. This Indonesian football confederation formed a national amateur competition held in 1931 under the name Inlandsche Stedenwedstrĳden. In 1933 between Persib Bandung and Persija Jakarta they met in the final match and was won by Persija Jakarta as champion, Persib Bandung as runner-up. In 1934 the following year they met again in the final match, Persib Bandung lost again in the final match. But after that the achievements of both clubs declined, until the competition stopped between 1944 and 1949 due to World War II.

=== 1950–1994 ===
In 1951 after Indonesian independence on August 17, 1945, the national amateur football competition in Indonesia was held again under the name Kejurnas PSSI (PSSI National Championship) until 1979 and was renamed Divisi Utama PSSI (PSSI Premier Division) until 1994. During that period, the two clubs did not have much competition between Persib Bandung and Persija Jakarta. The match that can be called a rivalry in the competition occurred when Persib Bandung met PSMS Medan, this match can be called a classic match in Indonesia and reached its peak in the final match of the Divisi Utama PSSI in 1985, recorded in the Asian Football Confederation book as the most attended amateur match in the history of Asian football with the number of spectators reaching 150,000 people at the Gelora Bung Karno Stadium, most of them were Bobotoh (the name for Persib supporters)

=== 1994–present (Indonesian League) ===
In 1994, PSSI merged the Divisi Utama PSSI (amateur) and Galatama (semi-professional) competitions to form the Indonesian League (professional). This competition began in 1994 as the top division in the Indonesian professional football league system. In 1993–94 Persib Bandung won the last Divisi Utama PSSI competition and won the first Indonesian League in 1994–95, each final match was held at the Gelora Bung Karno Main Stadium, Jakarta. Persija Jakarta, which did not have support because Jakarta was an urban society, finally built a supporter group founded directly by the club manager at the end of 1997, they opened registration and now it has reached thousands. The club brought in several mainstay players from former Bandung Raya players and managed to become champions of the Indonesian League in 2001.

In the 2000s, hooliganism in Indonesian football began to develop and did not only happen to Persib Bandung and Persija Jakarta supporters, creating competition not only among supporters but between the two clubs in Indonesia. The match between the two brings considerable attention in the world of Indonesian football due to the competitive nature.

== Results ==
=== Official match results ===
Data Incomplete

==== Perserikatan era ====
Competition	Date	Game	Result	Venue	City
1931 Perserikatan	1931	BIVB – VIJ	1–3		Bandung
1931 Perserikatan	5 April 1931	VIJ – BIVB	1–1	Laan Trivelli Field	Batavia
1932-33 Perserikatan	4 November 1932	PSIB – VIJ	0–1	Karimata Field	Semarang
1932-33 Perserikatan	7 May 1933	VIJ – PSIB	0–0		Bandung
Exhibition game	10 September 1933	PSIB – VIJ	2–1	Tegallega Field	Bandung
1933-34 Perserikatan	3 December 1933	VIJ – PSIB	4–0	Laan Trivelli Field	Batavia
1934-35 Perserikatan	1935	Persib – VIJ	5–0		
1936-37 Perserikatan	4 October 1936	VIJ – Persib	2–1	BKVB Field	Batavia
Merapi Anniversary Tournament	8 August 1937	Persib – VIJ	2–0	Tegallega Field	Bandung
Exhibition game	10 September 1938	VIJ – Persib	0–0		Batavia
1937-38 Perserikatan	11 February 1938	Persib – VIJ	1–1	Tegallega Field	Bandung
1938-39 Perserikatan	10 September 1938	VIJ – Persib	0–0	VIJ Field	Batavia
	1949	Persib – Persija	2–1		
Exhibition game	9 June 1950	Persija – Persib	Unknown	BVC Field	Jakarta
1950 PSSI Congress Tournament	21 August 1950	Persib – Persija	4–1		
1950 Bandung Tournament	29 September 1950	Persib – Persija	2–0	UNI Field	Bandung
Solo Tournament	26 November 1950	Persija – Persib	0–0	Sriwedari Stadium	Surakarta
1951 Perserikatan	7 October 1951	Persija – Persib	7–2	Ikada Stadium	Central Jakarta
1951 Perserikatan	18 November 1951	Persib – Persija	3–1		Bandung
Exhibition game	14 September 1952	Persib – Persija	4–3	UNI Field	Bandung
Exhibition game	21 September 1952	Persija – Persib	3–1	Ikada Stadium	Central Jakarta
1952 Perserikatan	30 November 1952	Persija – Persib	2–1		Jakarta
1952 Perserikatan	29 December 1952	Persib – Persija	0–0		Surabaya
Muhammadiyah Tournament	11 January 1953	Persija – Persib	3–2	Ikada Stadium	Central Jakarta
Exhibition game	16 April 1954	Persib – Persija	Unknown	Sidolig Stadium	Bandung
PS Sunda Anniversary Tournament	26 June 1954	Persib – Persija	2–2	Sidolig Stadium	Bandung
1953–54 Perserikatan	30 October 1954	Persija – Persib	4–2		Sukabumi
1955 PSSI Congress Tournament	28 December 1955	Persib – Persija	2–1	Sidolig Stadium	Bandung
Bandung Anniversary Tournament	30 March 1956	Persib – Persija	3–1	Siliwangi Stadium	Bandung
1956 CPM Anniversary Tournament	24 June 1956	Persija – Persib	5–2		Jakarta
Heroes Day Tournament	11 November 1956	Persib – Persija	0–2	Siliwangi Stadium	Bandung
Exhibition game	13 January 1957	Persija – Persib	6–1	Ikada Stadium	Central Jakarta
Exhibition game	3 February 1957	Persib – Persija	4–1	Siliwangi Stadium	Bandung
Exhibition game	10 March 1957	Persija – Persib	7–1	Ikada Stadium	Central Jakarta
Persit Tournament	1 June 1957	Persib – Persija	2–1	Siliwangi Stadium	Bandung
1956–57 Perserikatan	21 July 1957	Persib – Persija	3–3	Siliwangi Stadium	Bandung
Exhibition game	8 September 1957	Persib – Persija	2–4	Siliwangi Stadium	Bandung
Persija Anniversary Tournament	December 1958	Persija – Persib	Unknown	Ikada Stadium	Central Jakarta
1957–59 Perserikatan	9 August 1959	Persija – Persib	1–3	Ikada Stadium	Central Jakarta
Exhibition game	25 February 1960	Persib – Persija	2–0		Bandung
PS Andalas Anniversary Tournament	3 April 1960	Persija – Persib	4–4	Ikada Stadium	Central Jakarta
1960 CPM Anniversary Tournament	20 June 1960	Persija – Persib	3–3	Ikada Stadium	Central Jakarta
Exhibition game	18 September 1960	Persib – Persija	4–1		Bandung
Jakarta Tournament	21 October 1960	Persija – Persib	3–4	Ikada Stadium	Central Jakarta
1959–61 Perserikatan	1 July 1961	Persib – Persija	3–1		Semarang
1961 PSSI Invitation	1961	Persib – Persija	2–0		
1962 PSSI Tournament	1962	Persib – Persija	Unknown	Andi Mattalatta Stadium	Makassar
1962 General Rehearsal Cup	1962	Persija – Persib	1–2	Gelora Bung Karno Stadium	Central Jakarta
1963 PSSI Congress Tournament	8 July 1963	Persib – Persija	6–0	Siliwangi Stadium	Bandung
1963 Persib Anniversary Cup	10 August 1963	Persib – Persija	2–3	Siliwangi Stadium	Bandung
1962–64 Perserikatan	6 August 1964	Persija – Persib	3–1		Jakarta
1964–65 Perserikatan		Persija – Persib	Unknown		
1964–65 Perserikatan	14 August 1965	Persija – Persib	1–2	Gelora Bung Karno Stadium	Central Jakarta
1965–66 Perserikatan		Persija – Persib	Unknown		
1966–67 Perserikatan		Persija – Persib	Unknown		
1969–71 Perserikatan	14 June 1969	Persija – Persib	1–1	Menteng Stadium	Central Jakarta
1970 Makassar Anniversary Cup	4 June 1970	Persib – Persija	Unknown	Andi Mattalatta Stadium	Makassar
1970 Bandung Tournament	25 August 1970	Persib – Persija	0–1	Siliwangi Stadium	Bandung
1969–71 Perserikatan	19 September 1971	Persija – Persib	3–0		
1972 Marah Halim Cup	8 April 1972	Persija – Persib	1–0	Teladan Stadium	Medan
1972 Bandung Tournament	8 December 1972	Persib – Persija	2–1	Siliwangi Stadium	Bandung
1973 Persib Anniversary Cup	29 March 1973	Persib – Persija	0–1	Siliwangi Stadium	Bandung
1973 Marah Halim Cup	20 April 1973	Persija – Persib	0–0	Teladan Stadium	Medan
1971–73 Perserikatan	27 November 1973	Persija – Persib	2–0	Gelora Bung Karno Stadium	Central Jakarta
1974 Yusuf Cup	20 July 1974	Persib – Persija	3–0	Andi Mattalatta Stadium	Makassar
Sangkuriang Tournament	30 August 1974	Persib – Persija	0–0	Sangkuriang Stadium	Cimahi
Lokakarya Tournament	23 March 1975	Persib – Persija	3–1		Bandung
1973–75 Perserikatan	6 July 1975	Persib – Persija	1–0	Sidolig Stadium	Bandung
Putra Panjalu Anniversary Cup	13 August 1975	Persib – Persija	0–1	Sidolig Stadium	Bandung
Bangka Tournament	10 April 1976	Persib – Persija	1–0		Bangka Regency
1976 Siliwangi Cup	25 May 1976	Persib – Persija	1–1	Siliwangi Stadium	Bandung
1976 Surya Cup	1 June 1976	Persija – Persib	1–1	Gelora 10 November Stadium	Surabaya
Exhibition game	25 July 1976	Persib – Persija	4–0	Bima Stadium	Cirebon
1976 Yusuf Cup	2 August 1976	Persib – Persija	0–0	Andi Mattalatta Stadium	Makassar
1976 Yusuf Cup	10 August 1976	Persib – Persija	2–0 (7–0) (awarded) (Note: Persib was awarded 7-0 in the 1976 Yusuf Cup final after Persija abandoned the match in protest of refereeing decisions.)	Andi Mattalatta Stadium	Makassar
Jakarta Tournament	12 December 1976	Persija – Persib	0–0	Gelora Bung Karno Stadium	Central Jakarta
1977 Pangdam Cup	8 May 1977	Persib – Persija	1–0	Siliwangi Stadium	Bandung
1977 Surya Cup	28 May 1977	Persija – Persib	1–0	Gelora 10 November Stadium	Surabaya
1977 Bang Ali Cup	17 June 1977	Persib – Persija	2–2	Gelora Bung Karno Stadium	Central Jakarta
Exhibition game	10 November 1977	Persib – Persija	0–0	Siliwangi Stadium	Bandung
1977 Yusuf Cup	30 November 1977	Persija – Persib	1–0	Andi Mattalatta Stadium	Makassar
1977–78 Perserikatan	24 January 1978	Persija – Persib	3–0	Gelora Bung Karno Stadium	Central Jakarta
1978 Persib Anniversary Cup	1 April 1978	Persib – Persija	0–0	Siliwangi Stadium	Bandung
1978 Surya Cup	21 May 1978	Persija – Persib	1–1	Gelora 10 November Stadium	Surabaya
1978 Surya Cup	30 May 1978	Persib – Persija	1–0	Gelora 10 November Stadium	Surabaya
1978 Siliwangi Cup	3 July 1978	Persib – Persija	1–2	Siliwangi Stadium	Bandung
1978 Tugu Muda Cup	26 July 1978	Persib – Persija	3–0	Diponegoro Stadium	Semarang
1978 Yusuf Cup	17 September 1978	Persija – Persib	0–0	Andi Mattalatta Stadium	Makassar
1978 Yusuf Cup	21 September 1978	Persib – Persija	1–0	Andi Mattalatta Stadium	Makassar
1978 Bogor Mayor Cup	1 October 1978	Persib – Persija	1–0	Pajajaran Stadium	Bogor
1979 Bandung Urang Cup	12 April 1979	Persib – Persija	4–0	Siliwangi Stadium	Bandung
1979 Bogor Mayor Cup	3 May 1979	Persija – Persib	1–0	Pajajaran Stadium	Bogor
1979 Yusuf Cup	14 September 1979	Persib – Persija	1–0	Andi Mattalatta Stadium	Makassar
1980 PSSI Anniversary Cup	17 April 1980	Persija – Persib	2–1	Gelora Bung Karno Main Stadium	Central Jakarta
KAA Tournament	5 May 1980	Persib – Persija	2–2	Siliwangi Stadium	Bandung
1980 Siliwangi Cup	12 May 1980	Persib – Persija	2–1	Siliwangi Stadium	Bandung
1980 Yusuf Cup	27 October 1980	Persib – Persija	1–0	Andi Mattalatta Stadium	Makassar
1982 Galunggung Cup	22 September 1982	Persija – Persib	0–2	Menteng Stadium	Central Jakarta
1983 Perserikatan	26 September 1983	Persib – Persija	0–0	Imam Bonjol Stadium	Padang
1983 Perserikatan	31 October 1983	Persija – Persib	0–0	Siliwangi Stadium	Bandung
1984 Persib Anniversary Cup	1 February 1984	Persib – Persija	3–1	Siliwangi Stadium	Bandung
1984 Padang Mayor Cup	February 1984	Persija – Persib	Unknown	Haji Agus Salim Stadium	Padang
1984 Yusuf Cup	4 May 1984	Persib – Persija	1–0	Andi Mattalatta Stadium	Makassar
1985 Perserikatan	16 January 1985	Persib – Persija	3–0	Lampineung Stadium	Banda Aceh
1985 Perserikatan	6 February 1985	Persija – Persib	0–4	Menteng Stadium	Central Jakarta
1986 Perserikatan	30 January 1986	Persija – Persib	2–2	Teladan Stadium	Medan
1986 Perserikatan	14 February 1986	Persib – Persija	0–0	Siliwangi Stadium	Bandung
1986 Perserikatan	27 February 1986	Persija – Persib	3–2	Gelora Bung Karno Stadium	Central Jakarta
Exhibition game	1986	Persib – Persija	Unknown		Bandung
Exhibition game	30 August 1986	Persija – Persib	5–0	Menteng Stadium	Central Jakarta
1986–87 Perserikatan	16 November 1986	Persib – Persija	0–1	Siliwangi Stadium	Bandung
1986–87 Perserikatan	21 December 1986	Persija – Persib	0–1	Menteng Stadium	Central Jakarta
1986–87 Perserikatan	5 March 1987	Persija – Persib	0–0	Gelora Bung Karno Stadium	Central Jakarta
1987–88 Perserikatan	15 November 1987	Persib – Persija	0–1		Bandung
1987-88 Perserikatan	31 January 1988	Persija – Persib	3–3	Menteng Stadium	Central Jakarta
1987–88 Perserikatan	19 March 1988	Persib – Persija	1–1	Gelora Bung Karno Stadium	Central Jakarta
Exhibition game	20 November 1988	Persib – Persija	Unknown	Siliwangi Stadium	Bandung
1988 Persija Cup	27 November 1988	Persija – Persib	1–1	Gelora Bung Karno Stadium	Central Jakarta
1989 Persib Anniversary Cup	4 March 1989	Persib – Persija	1–1	Siliwangi Stadium	Bandung
1989 Siliwangi Cup	18 June 1989	Persib – Persija	0–1	Siliwangi Stadium	Bandung
1989 Siliwangi Cup	29 June 1989	Persib – Persija	2–0	Siliwangi Stadium	Bandung
1989–90 Perserikatan	26 November 1989	Persib – Persija	0–0		Bandung
1989–90 Perserikatan	28 January 1990	Persija – Persib	2–2	Menteng Stadium	Central Jakarta
1990 Java Pos Cup	10 September 1990	Persija – Persib	0–2	Gelora 10 November Stadium	Surabaya
1990 Main Cup	19 November 1990	Persib – Persija	4–0	Siliwangi Stadium	Bandung
1991 Persija Cup	August 1991	Persija – Persib	0–2	Gelora Bung Karno Stadium	Central Jakarta
1991–92 Perserikatan	3 November 1991	Persija – Persib	0–0	Menteng Stadium	Central Jakarta
1991–92 Perserikatan	30 January 1992	Persib – Persija	3–1		Bandung
1993 Surya Cup	10 July 1993	Persija – Persib	2–0	Gelora 10 November Stadium	Surabaya
1993–94 Perserikatan	12 December 1993	Persib – Persija	3–0		Bandung
1993–94 Perserikatan	30 January 1994	Persija – Persib	2–2	Menteng Stadium	Central Jakarta
1993–94 Perserikatan	15 April 1994	Persija – Persib	1–1 (4–5) (PSO)	Gelora Bung Karno Stadium	Central Jakarta
1994 Siliwangi Cup	15 June 1994	Persib – Persija	2–2 (4–2) (PSO)	Siliwangi Stadium	Bandung

==== Liga Indonesia era ====
Competition	Date	Home team	Result	Away team	Venue	City
1994–95 Premier Division	16 April 1995	Persija	1–1	Persib	Menteng Stadium	Central Jakarta
1994–95 Premier Division	21 May 1995	Persib	2–1	Persija		
1995–96 Premier Division	7 July 1996	Persija	2–2	Persib	Menteng Stadium	Central Jakarta
1995–96 Premier Division	5 May 1996	Persib	1–0	Persija		
1998–99 Premier Division	29 November 1998	Persija	1–0	Persib	Lebak Bulus Stadium	South Jakarta
1998–99 Premier Division	14 February 1999	Persib	1–3	Persija	Siliwangi Stadium	Bandung
1999–2000 Premier Division	23 March 2000	Persib	2–3	Persija	Kostrad Field	Depok
1999–2000 Premier Division	6 April 2000	Persija	2–1	Persib	Lebak Bulus Stadium	South Jakarta
2001 Liga Indonesia Premier Division	11 February 2001	Persib	0–1	Persija	Siliwangi Stadium	Bandung
2001 Liga Indonesia Premier Division	24 June 2001	Persija	3–0	Persib	Lebak Bulus Stadium	South Jakarta
2002 Premier Division	3 March 2002	Persib	1–1	Persija	Siliwangi Stadium	Bandung
2002 Premier Division	9 May 2002	Persija	2–0	Persib	Lebak Bulus Stadium	South Jakarta
2003 Premier Division	16 February 2003	Persib	1–2	Persija	Siliwangi Stadium	Bandung
2003 Premier Division	26 June 2003	Persija	3–0	Persib	Lebak Bulus Stadium	South Jakarta
2004 Premier Division	12 May 2004	Persib	0–0	Persija	Siliwangi Stadium	Bandung
2004 Premier Division	29 September 2004	Persija	1–0	Persib	Lebak Bulus Stadium	South Jakarta
2005 Premier Division	22 May 2005	Persib	1–1	Persija	Siliwangi Stadium	Bandung
2005 Premier Division	4 September 2005	Persija	3–0 (w.o.) (Note: Persija was awarded 3–0 in their 2005 home match after Persib withdrew from the match due to crowd safety concerns.)	Persib	Lebak Bulus Stadium	South Jakarta
2006 Premier Division	26 February 2006	Persija	0–0	Persib	Lebak Bulus Stadium	South Jakarta
2006 Premier Division	20 May 2006	Persib	1–1	Persija	Siliwangi Stadium	Bandung
2007 Yusuf Cup	9 January 2007	Persija	0–0	Persib	Andi Mattalatta Stadium	Makassar
2007–08 Premier Division	24 April 2007	Persib	3–0	Persija	Siliwangi Stadium	Bandung
2007–08 Premier Division	16 August 2007	Persija	1–0	Persib	Lebak Bulus Stadium	South Jakarta
2008–09 Indonesia Super League	20 July 2008	Persib	2–3	Persija	Siliwangi Stadium	Bandung
2008–09 Indonesia Super League	10 June 2009	Persija	1–2	Persib	Gajayana Stadium	Malang
2009–10 Indonesia Super League	9 January 2010	Persib	0–0	Persija	Si Jalak Harupat Stadium	Soreang
2009–10 Indonesia Super League	25 March 2010	Persija	2–2	Persib	Gelora Bung Karno Stadium	Central Jakarta
2010–11 Indonesia Super League	30 October 2010	Persija	3–0	Persib	Gelora Bung Karno Stadium	Central Jakarta
2010–11 Indonesia Super League	18 March 2011	Persib	2–3	Persija	Si Jalak Harupat Stadium	Soreang
2011–12 Indonesia Super League	29 January 2012	Persib	1–0	Persija	Si Jalak Harupat Stadium	Soreang
2011–12 Indonesia Super League	27 May 2012	Persija	2–2	Persib	Gelora Bung Karno Stadium	Central Jakarta
2013 Indonesia Super League	3 March 2013	Persib	3–1	Persija	Si Jalak Harupat Stadium	Soreang
2013 Indonesia Super League	28 August 2013	Persija	1–1	Persib	Maguwoharjo Stadium	Sleman
2014 Indonesia Super League	8 May 2014	Persib	0–0	Persija	Si Jalak Harupat Stadium	Bandung
2014 Indonesia Super League	10 August 2014	Persija	0–0	Persib	Gelora Bung Karno Stadium	Central Jakarta
2016 Indonesia Soccer Championship A	16 July 2016	Persib	0–0	Persija	Gelora Bandung Lautan Api Stadium	Bandung
2016 Indonesia Soccer Championship A	5 November 2016	Persija	0–0	Persib	Manahan Stadium	Surakarta
2017 Liga 1	22 July 2017	Persib	1–1	Persija	Gelora Bandung Lautan Api Stadium	Bandung
2017 Liga 1	3 November 2017	Persija	1–0 (3–0) (awarded) (Note: Persija was awarded 3–0 in their 2017 home match (held in a neutral venue for security reasons) after Persib withdrew from the match with less than five minutes remaining on the clock; Persija had been leading 1–0 at the time of stoppage.)	Persib	Manahan Stadium	Surakarta
2018 Liga 1	30 June 2018	Persija	1–0	Persib	PTIK Stadium	South Jakarta
2018 Liga 1	23 September 2018	Persib	3–2	Persija	Gelora Bandung Lautan Api Stadium	Bandung
2019 Liga 1	10 July 2019	Persija	1–1	Persib	Gelora Bung Karno Stadium	Central Jakarta
2019 Liga 1	28 October 2019	Persib	2–0	Persija	Kapten I Wayan Dipta Stadium	Gianyar, Bali
2021 Menpora Cup	22 April 2021	Persija	2–0	Persib	Maguwoharjo Stadium	Sleman
2021 Menpora Cup	25 April 2021	Persib	1–2	Persija	Manahan Stadium	Surakarta
2021–22 Liga 1	20 November 2021	Persib	0–1	Persija	Manahan Stadium	Surakarta
2021–22 Liga 1	1 March 2022	Persija	0–2	Persib	Kapten I Wayan Dipta Stadium	Gianyar, Bali
2022–23 Liga 1	11 January 2023	Persib	1–0	Persija	Gelora Bandung Lautan Api Stadium	Bandung
2022–23 Liga 1	31 March 2023	Persija	2–0	Persib	Patriot Candrabhaga Stadium	Bekasi
2023–24 Liga 1	2 September 2023	Persija	1–1	Persib	Patriot Candrabhaga Stadium	Bekasi
2023–24 Liga 1	9 March 2024	Persib	2–1	Persija	Si Jalak Harupat Stadium	Soreang
2024–25 Liga 1	23 September 2024	Persib	2–0	Persija	Si Jalak Harupat Stadium	Soreang
2024–25 Liga 1	16 February 2025	Persija	2–2	Persib	Patriot Candrabhaga Stadium	Bekasi
2025–26 Super League	11 January 2026	Persib	1–0	Persija	Gelora Bandung Lautan Api Stadium	Bandung
2025–26 Super League	10 May 2026	Persija	1–2	Persib	Segiri Stadium	Samarinda
2026 Piala Presiden	4 August 2026	Persib	2–1	Persija	Kapten I Wayan Dipta Stadium	Gianyar
2026–27 Super League	12 September 2026	Persija	2–1	Persib	Gelora Bung Karno Stadium	Central Jakarta
2026–27 Super League	24 April 2027	Persib		Persija	Gelora Bandung Lautan Api Stadium	Bandung

=== Head-to-head results overall ===
As of 12 September 2026

Persija wins	52
Draws	54
Persib wins	65
Unknown	12
Persija goals	215
Persib goals	237
Total matches	183

== Records ==
=== Most appearances ===
- Players in **bold** are still active

Position	Player	Team	Caps
1	(Indonesia) Ismed Sofyan	Persija Jakarta	18
2	(Indonesia) Atep Rizal	Persija (1) Persib (15)	16
3	(Indonesia) Maman Abdurrahman	Persib (9) Persija (6)	15
4	(Indonesia) Hariono	Persib Bandung	14
5	(Indonesia) Bambang Pamungkas	Persija Jakarta	13
5	(Indonesia) Tony Sucipto	Persija (3) Persib (10)	13
7	(Cameroon) Abanda Herman	Persija (6) Persib (5)	11
7	(Indonesia) **Andritany Ardhiyasa**	Persija Jakarta	11
9	(Indonesia) **Riko Simanjuntak**	Persija Jakarta	10
10	(Indonesia) Amarzukih	Persija Jakarta	9
11	(Indonesia) Muhammad Ilham	Persija (6) Persib (2)	8

=== Top goalscorers ===
- Players in **bold** are still active

Position	Player	Team	Goals
1	(Indonesia) Bambang Pamungkas	Persija Jakarta	9
2	(Brazil) **David da Silva**	Persib Bandung	6
3	(Uruguay) (Indonesia) Cristian Gonzáles	Persib Bandung	3
3	(Cameroon) Abanda Herman	Persija (2) Persib (1)	3
3	(Netherlands) (Indonesia) Sergio van Dijk	Persib Bandung	3
3	(Croatia) **Marko Šimić**	Persija Jakarta	3
7	(Indonesia) Aliyudin	Persija Jakarta	2
7	(Indonesia) Ramdani Lestaluhu	Persija Jakarta	2
7	(Cameroon) Christian Bekamenga	Persib Bandung	2
7	(Brazil) Jaime Xavier	Persija Jakarta	2
7	(Indonesia) Adam Alis	Persib Bandung	2

=== Clean sheets ===
- Players in **bold** are still active

Players	Persija clean sheets	Persib clean sheets	Total
(Indonesia) **Andritany Ardhiyasa**	7	-	7
(Indonesia) I Made Wirawan	-	3	3
(Moldova) Evgeny Khmaruk	1	-	1
(Indonesia) Tema Mursadat	-	1	1
(Thailand) Sinthaweechai Hathairattanakool	-	1	1
(Indonesia) Muhammad Yasir	1	-	1
(Indonesia) Hendro Kartiko	1	-	1
(Indonesia) Yandri Pitoy	-	1	1
(Indonesia) Daryono	1	-	1
(Indonesia) Muhammad Natshir	-	1	1
(Philippines) Kevin Ray Mendoza	-	1	1

== Players and personnel in both teams ==
Note:

- Since Liga Indonesia era (1994–present)
- Players in **bold** are still active

=== Players who played for both clubs ===
==== Persib then Persija ====
Player	Persib	Persija
(Indonesia) **Aqil Savik**	2018–2022	2026–Present
(Indonesia) Yandi Sofyan	2015–2016	2025
(Mali) Makan Konaté	2014–2015	2021–2022
(Indonesia) Rachmad Hidayat	2016	2019
(Indonesia) Shahar Ginanjar	2013–2015	2018–2021
(Indonesia) Asri Akbar	2013	2018
(Indonesia) Maman Abdurrahman	2008–2013	2016–2024
(Mali) Djibril Coulibaly	2014	2016
(Indonesia) Salim Alaydrus	2006–2009	2009
(Indonesia) Erik Setiawan	2002, 2004–2008	2009–2010
(Indonesia) Harry Salisbury	2008–2009	2009–2010
(Brazil) Fábio Lopes	2008	2009
(Indonesia) Marwal Iskandar	2003	2006
(Indonesia) Andi Supendi	1999–2000, 2004	2003
(Indonesia) Khair Rifo	1997–1998	1999–2000

==== Persija then Persib ====
Player	Persija	Persib
(Indonesia) **Adam Alis**	2015	2024–present
(Indonesia) **Al Hamra Hehanussa**	2019–2022	2025–present
(Indonesia) Rezaldi Hehanussa	2016–2023	2023–2026
(Indonesia) Reky Rahayu	2015–2016	2022–2024
(Indonesia) / (Netherlands) **Marc Klok**	2020–2021	2021–present
(Indonesia) / (Brazil) Fabiano Beltrame	2011–2014	2019–2021
(Indonesia) / (Netherlands) Raphael Maitimo	2015	2017
(Argentina) Robertino Pugliara	2007–2009, 2011–2013	2016
(Indonesia) Firman Utina	2010	2013–2015
(Indonesia) Yandri Pitoy	2011	2011–2012
(Indonesia) Mohammad Nasuha	2010–2011	2011–2013
(Indonesia) Aliyudin	2007–2011	2011–2012
(Indonesia) Muhammad Ilham	2007–2011, 2013, 2015–2016	2011–2012
(Indonesia) Tony Sucipto	2010–2011, 2019–2024	2011–2018
(Cameroon) Abanda Herman	2006–2010	2011–2013
(Singapore) Baihakki Khaizan	2009–2010	2010
(Indonesia) Budi Sudarsono	2001–2002, 2003–2004	2009–2010
(Indonesia) Atep Rizal	2004–2008	2008–2018
(Paraguay) Lorenzo Cabanas	2005	2007–2009
(Indonesia) Sonny Kurniawan	2006–2007	2007–2008
(Cameroon) Ayock Berty	2004–2005	2006
(Indonesia) Charis Yulianto	2005–2006	2006–2007
(Indonesia) Gendut Doni	2002	2006
(Brazil) Antônio Cláudio	2001–2003	2005–2006
(Indonesia) Imran Nahumarury	2000–2003	2004
(Indonesia) Nur'alim	2001	2004
(Indonesia) Alexander Pulalo	2001–2003	2004
(Indonesia) Rachmat Afandi	2002, 2011–2014	2010–2011
(Indonesia) Suwandi H. Siswoyo	2000	2004
(Indonesia) Andrian Mardiansyah	1999–2001	2002
(Indonesia) Harry Saputra	1999–2000	2002
(Timor-Leste) / (Indonesia) Luís Simões	1995–1997	2001

=== Head coaches who coached for both clubs ===
Head coach	Persija	Persib
(Moldova) Arcan Iurie	2005-2006	2006-2008

== Trophies ==
Persib	Competition	Persija
Domestic (Note: Excluding pre-season tournaments)
10	League (Note: Including Indonesia Soccer Championship)	11
-	Piala Indonesia	-
-	Indonesian Community Shield	-
10	Aggregate	11
Asian and Worldwide
-	ASEAN Club Championship	-
-	AFC Cup/AFC Champions League Two	-
-	AFC Champions League Elite	-
-	FIFA Club World Cup	-
0	Aggregate	0
10	Total Aggregate	11

== Head-to-head ranking in Super League (2009–2026) ==
P.	09	10	11	12	13	14	17	18	19	22	23	24	25	26	27
1						1		1				1	1	1	
2										2	2				
3	3		3								3			3	
4		4			4		4	4							
5		5		5		5 (Note: in West Div.)									
6									6						
7	7		7										7		
8				8						8		8			
9															
10									10						
11					11										
12															
13							13								
14															
15															
16															
17															
18															
19															
20															
21															
22															

Key
Persib
Persija

- Total: Persib with 9 higher finishes, Persija with 5 higher finish.

== Supporters ==
Their supporters have never been officially met in one stadium (away fans are never allowed to attend) after the start of hostilities between supporters of Persija and Persib in the 2000s, to date. Many conflicts occur including the death of one of the supporters and clashes which resulted in injury.

=== Persib ===
Persib fans often refer to themselves as Bobotoh. This name comes from the Sundanese language and literally means "a group of people who provide support, spirit and encouragement to those on the pitch". The most famous group of Persib supporters is Viking Persib Club, the first supporter group in Indonesia.

=== Persija ===
Persija's supporters are called the Jakmania, founded in 1997 by Gugun Gondrong and Ferry Indra Sjarif. The Jakmania is one of the biggest football fan groups in Indonesia and use orange as their main colour, even though the club have since switched to red.

== Incident ==
Since 2000, they have only shared the same stand in 2009 and 2013. Their clashes often occur outside of matches, particularly in the border area. Following the events of 2013 and despite attempts to reconcile the two fanbases, a strict ban on sharing the same stand was imposed and security measures for players were tightened.

=== Malang ===
Gajayana Stadium, Malang. On June 10, 2009, Persija Jakarta failed to secure a public gathering permit from the Jakarta Metropolitan Police due to the proximity of the event to 2009 Presidential Election campaign activities. The organizing committee designated Gajayana Stadium in Malang as the emergency venue for the match. While the visiting team's supporters (Persib) were banned from traveling to the match—with tickets reserved exclusively for Persija fans, a group Persib supoorter led by Ayi Beutik defied the management's agreement, they traveled by train and managed to enter the south stand of Gajayana Stadium. Major clashes were averted thanks to the presence of Aremania (the local home supporters) and the police, who intervened to de-escalate the situation. Persib won the match 2–1 against Persija.

=== Sleman ===
On June 22, 2013, the match between Persija and Persib at Gelora Bung Karno Stadium was canceled after some Persija supporters threw Molotov cocktails and stones at the Persib team bus on its way to the stadium. The match was then rescheduled for August 27, 2013, at Maguwoharjo Stadium in Sleman. Persib supporters were not allowed to wear their attributes and gather in groups to attend, but they traveled to the stadium by bus. Persib supporters eventually entered the south stand where Persija supporters' banners were displayed, they took down Persija banners and damaged them, some Persib supporters provoked and approached Persija supporters in the east stand, clashes occurred until Persib supporters were forced to the west stand due to being outnumbered. Police secured the riot until the match was underway, the south stand was filled with home fans (PSS Sleman). After the match ended, Persib supporters left the stadium first, they were attacked from the top of the stands and when the bus was about to leave, a group of people attacked with stones until they finally managed to leave the stadium area. Persija supporters then exited the stadium, but they misdirected attacks on local supporters or local residents. Clashes broke out again, but police managed to control the riot. The match between Persib and Persija ended in a 1-1 draw.

== Deaths of fans ==
There were two incidents that were highlighted by the national media and became a concern in Indonesian football, even though fan deaths often occur outside matches.

=== Persib ===
The rivalry has led to the deaths of many fans of both sides. On 5 March 2012, when Persija were hosting Persib at Gelora Bung Karno Stadium, Rangga Cipta Nugraha (Persib fans) was killed with a chair by home fans after he celebrated a Persib goal. Rangga did not stop bleeding even when he was buried.

=== Persija ===
Another tragedy happened on September 23, 2018, when before a Liga 1 match between Persija and Persib began at the Gelora Bandung Lautan Api Stadium, Haringga Sirla, a Jakmania member, was killed by some Persib supporters. In response to the incident, the Football Association of Indonesia (PSSI) suspended Liga 1 for two weeks and forced Persib to pay a IDR 100 million (US$6,634) fine and play the remainder of their home matches of the 2018 season behind closed doors.

== Reconciliation ==
Until now, many parties want these two supporters to unite, but there are still many who provoke either from The Jakmania or Bobotoh, whether on social media or in real life. The dark past makes these two supporters difficult to unite, even to the point that there is a slogan, “Biarkan Permusuhan Ini Abadi”, which means, “Let This Enmity Be Eternal” from one of the main figure Bobotoh frontman.

Following the Kanjuruhan Stadium disaster, Persija and Persib supporters participated in prayer ceremonies in Jakarta and Bandung while proudly wearing the club's attribute. Several subgroups of both sides declared to reduce aggressive fanaticism and promote a safe atmosphere at that moment.

== See also ==
- Sports rivalry
- List of association football club rivalries in Indonesia
- Nationalism and sport
- Liga 1 (Indonesia)
- Super East Java derby
- Pasundan derby
- Football in Indonesia
