= VIJ =

VIJ may refer to:

- Virgin Gorda Airport, an airport on Virgin Gorda in the British Virgin Islands
- VIJ Stadium, Jakarta, Indonesia, or its home team, Dutch East Indies football club Voetbalbond Indonesische Jacatra

== See also ==
- Vij, an Indian surname
