= List of winners of the Liga Indonesia Third Division as the fifth tier =

Indonesian League (5th tier)

Liga Indonesia Third Division (2008–2013)
- Country
- Indonesia
- Founded
- 2008
- Number of teams
- Unlimited
- Current champions
- Perseba Bangkalan (2013)
- Most successful club
- 6 clubs (1 title each)

A national fifth-tier league of Indonesian football was initially established as the Liga Indonesia Third Division in 2008. Following the formation of the Indonesia Super League in 2008 as the new top-tier competition, the Liga Indonesia Third Division was relegated to the fifth tier. Due to conflicts between Badan Liga Sepakbola Amatir Indonesia (BLAI) and PT Liga Prima Indonesia Sportindo (LPIS), two separate Third Division competitions were held during the 2011–12 season—one under the Indonesia Super League (ISL) and the other under the Indonesian Premier League.

In 2014, the Liga Indonesia Third Division and Second Division were merged into a single tier known as Liga Nusantara. As a result, the fifth tier of Indonesian football ceased to exist, leaving Liga Nusantara as the new lowest national league competition.

== List of champions by season ==
| Season | Champions | Runners-up |
|---|---|---|
| 2008 | Persikotas Tasikmalaya | Persitema Temanggung |
| 2009–10 | Persewar Waropen | PS PPU |
| 2010–11 | MBU Sidoarjo | PS TGM Medan |
| 2011–12 (BLAI) | Jember United | PS Gianyar |
| 2011–12 (LPIS) | Persiga Trenggalek | PSAU North Aceh |
| 2013 | Perseba Bangkalan | Persintan Intan Jaya |

== See also ==
- Indonesian football league system
- List of Indonesian football champions
- List of winners of the Championship and predecessors
- List of winners of the Liga Nusantara and predecessors
- List of winners of the Liga 4 and predecessors
