= List of winners of the Championship and predecessors =

Championship (2nd tier)

Liga Indonesia First Division (1994–2007) Liga Indonesia Premier Division (2008–2015) Indonesia Soccer Championship B (2016) Liga 2 (2017–2025) Championship (2025–present)
- Country
- Indonesia
- Founded
- 1994
- Number of teams
- 20 (2025–26 season)
- Current champions
- Garudayaksa (2025–26)
- Most successful club
- Persebaya Surabaya (3 titles)

A national second-tier league of Indonesian football was initially established as the Liga Indonesia First Division in 1994. Following the formation of the Indonesia Super League in 2008 as the new top-tier competition, the Liga Indonesia Premier Division was relegated to the second tier. Due to conflicts between PT Liga Indonesia (LI) and PT Liga Prima Indonesia Sportindo (LPIS), two separate Premier Division competitions were held during the 2011–12 and 2013 seasons—one under the ISL and the other under the Indonesian Premier League. In January 2017, PSSI rebranded the Premier Division as Liga 2. In August 2025, PSSI rebranded again the Liga 2 as Championship and PT Liga Indonesia Baru (PT LIB) rebranded as I-League.

== List of champions by season ==
- Teams marked with an asterisk (*) were not promoted.

Season	Champions (number of titles)	Runners-up	Third place
Liga Indonesia First Division (1995–2007)
1994–95	Persikab Bandung (1)	Persma Manado	PSBL Bandar Lampung*
1995–96	PSP Padang (1)	Persedikab Kediri	PSBL Bandar Lampung
1996–97	Persikota Tangerang (1)	PSIM Yogyakarta	Persikabo Bogor
1997–98	competition not held		
1998–99	PSPS Pekanbaru (1)	Indocement Cirebon	Persijatim East Jakarta
1999–2000	Persita Tangerang (1)	PSS Sleman	Persikabo Bogor
2001	PSIS Semarang (1)	Persedikab Kediri	Persekaba Badung*
2002	Persik Kediri (1)	Perseden Denpasar	Persma Manado*
2003	Persebaya Surabaya (1)	PSMS Medan	Persela Lamongan
2004	Arema Malang (1)	PSDS Deli Serdang	Persibom Bolaang Mongondow
2005	PSIM Yogyakarta (1)	Persiwa Wamena	Persiter Ternate
2006	Persebaya Surabaya (2)	Persis Solo	—
2007	Persibo Bojonegoro (1)	Persikad Depok	—
Liga Indonesia Premier Division (2008–2015)
2008–09	Persisam Putra Samarinda (1)	Persema Malang	PSPS Pekanbaru
2009–10	Persibo Bojonegoro (2)	Deltras Sidoarjo	Semen Padang
2010–11	Persiba Bantul (1)	Persiraja Banda Aceh	Mitra Kukar
2011–12 (LI)	Barito Putera (1)	Persita Tangerang	Persepam Madura United
2011–12 (LPIS)	Persepar Palangka Raya (1)	Pro Duta	Perseman Manokwari
2013 (LI)	Persebaya DU (Bhayangkara) (1)	Perseru Serui	Persik Kediri
2013 (LPIS)	PSS Sleman* (1)	Lampung*	Persitara North Jakarta*
2014	Pusamania Borneo (1)	Persiwa Wamena	—
2015	season abandoned due to FIFA suspension of Indonesia		
Liga 2 (2017–2025)
2017	Persebaya Surabaya (3)	PSMS Medan	PSIS Semarang
2018	PSS Sleman (2)	Semen Padang	Kalteng Putra
2019	Persik Kediri (2)	Persita Tangerang	Persiraja Banda Aceh
2020	season abandoned due to COVID-19 pandemic in Indonesia		
2021	Persis Solo (1)	RANS Cilegon	Dewa United
2022–23	season abandoned after Kanjuruhan Stadium disaster		
2023–24	PSBS Biak (1)	Semen Padang	Malut United
2024–25	PSIM Yogyakarta (2)	Bhayangkara Presisi	Persijap Jepara
Championship (2025–present)
2025–26	Garudayaksa (1)	PSS Sleman	Adhyaksa Banten

== Other tournaments ==
Several tournaments were organized in the place of a second-tier league during Indonesia's suspension from FIFA between December 2015 and May 2016. The winners are not officially recognized as second-tier champion.

Season	Winners	Runners-up	Third place
2016 ISC B	PSCS Cilacap	PSS Sleman	Perssu Kaisar Madura

== Number of titles overall ==
Clubs in bold are competing in the 2026–27 Championship.

Rank	Club	Winners	Winning seasons
1	Persebaya Surabaya	3	2003, 2006, 2017
2	Persibo Bojonegoro	2	2007, 2009–10
2	PSS Sleman	2	2013 (LPIS), 2018
2	Persik Kediri	2	2002, 2019
2	PSIM Yogyakarta	2	2005, 2024–25
7	Arema Malang	1	2004
7	**Barito Putera**	1	2011–12 (LI)
7	Persebaya DU (Bhayangkara)	1	2013 (LI)
7	Garudayaksa	1	2025–26
7	Persepar Palangkaraya	1	2011–12 (LPIS)
7	Persiba Bantul	1	2010–11
7	Persikab Bandung	1	1994–95
7	Persikota Tangerang	1	1996–97
7	Persita Tangerang	1	1999–2000
7	**Persis Solo**	1	2021
7	Persisam Putra Samarinda	1	2008–09
7	**PSBS Biak**	1	2023–24
7	**PSIS Semarang**	1	2001
7	PSP Padang	1	1995–96
7	**PSPS Pekanbaru**	1	1998–99
7	Pusamania Borneo	1	2014
	PSCS Cilacap		2016 (ISC B)

Notes:

1. Not an official competition affiliated with PSSI, AFC & FIFA.

== See also ==
- Indonesian football league system
- List of Indonesian football champions
- List of winners of the Liga Nusantara and predecessors
- List of winners of the Liga 4 and predecessors
- List of winners of the Liga Indonesia Third Division as the fifth tier
