= Syamsuddin =

Syamsuddin is an Indonesian name. Notable people with the name include:

- Syamsuddin Mahmud (1935–2021), Indonesian politician
- Syamsuddin Umar (born 1955), Indonesian football manager
- Amir Syamsuddin (born 1941), Indonesian politician
- Azis Syamsuddin (born 1970), Indonesian politician
- Din Syamsuddin (born 1958), Indonesian politician
- Syaiful Syamsuddin (born 1993), Indonesian footballer
