= Pasundan derby =

Football rivalry in Indonesia

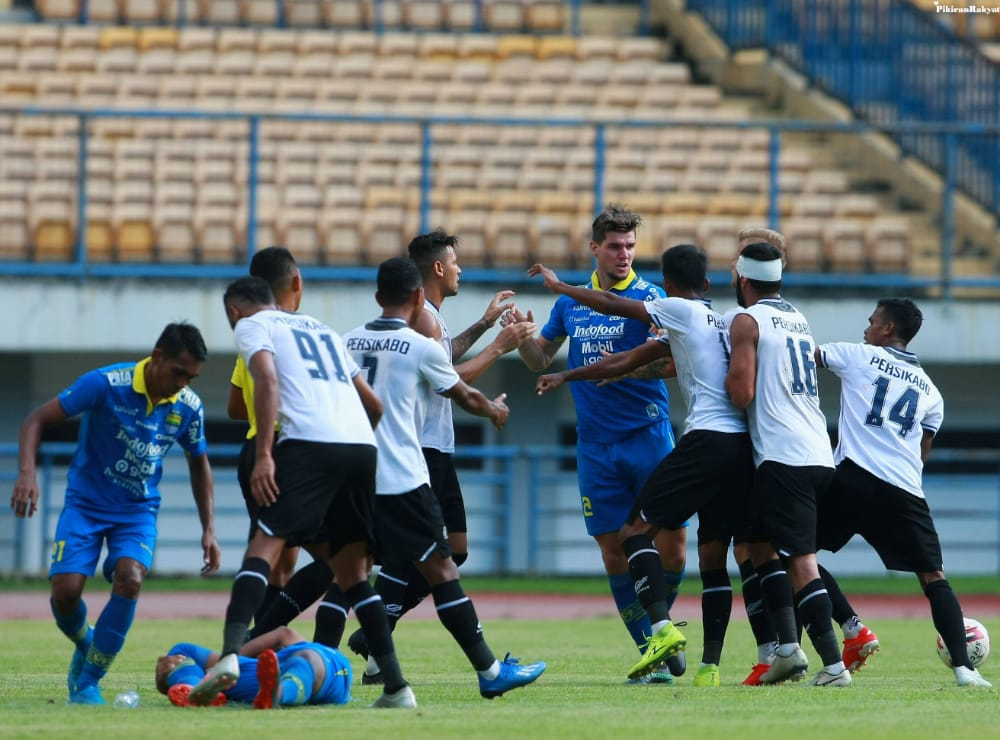
- Clashes between Persib (blue) and Persikabo 1973 (white) players in a friendly match at the Gelora Bandung Lautan Api Stadium in 2020.
- Native name: ᮓᮨᮁᮘᮤ ᮕᮞᮥᮔ᮪ᮓᮔ᮪
- Other names: West Java derby
- Sport: Football
- Location: West Java, Indonesia
- Teams: Persib Bandung; Persikabo 1973
- First meeting: 2 March 2019; 2019 President Cup; Persib Bandung 1–2 PS Tira Persikabo
- Latest meeting: 15 March 2024; 2023–24 Liga 1 Persikabo 1973 1–3 Persib Bandung
- Next meeting: TBA
- Broadcasters: Indosiar
- Stadiums: Gelora Bandung Lautan Api Stadium (Persib Bandung); Pakansari Stadium (Persikabo 1973)

Statistics
- Total meetings: 9
- Most wins: Persib Bandung
- Most player appearances: Achmad Jufriyanto (4)
- Top scorer: David da Silva (4)
- All-time record: Persib Bandung: 3 Draw: 4 Persikabo 1973: 2
- Largest victory: 15 April 2023; 2022–23 Liga 1 Persib Bandung 1–4 Persikabo 1973
- Largest goal scoring: 15 April 2023; 2022–23 Liga 1 Persib Bandung 1–4 Persikabo 1973 (5 goals)
- Longest unbeaten streak: 5 matches Persib Bandung (2019–2022)
- Location in West Java, Indonesia

Pasundan derby (Sundanese: ᮓᮨᮁᮘᮤ ᮕᮞᮥᮔ᮪ᮓᮔ᮪, romanized: Dérbi Pasundan) is an Indonesia football match between Persib Bandung against Persikabo 1973, the main club from West Java competing in Liga 1. The name "Derby Pasundan" is derived from the geographical region and historical cultural area within the province known as Pasundan.

This match was a rivalry for a long time and then met the highest division which started in the 2019 Liga 1 season. Part of the game is because the clubs has played in the top division.

== History ==
Historically, the two teams have rarely met in Indonesia's top-flight football competition due to the difference in their league tiers. Persib Bandung has been a traditional powerhouse since the Perserikatan era, whereas Persikabo Bogor has more frequently competed in lower divisions. (Note: During the Perserikatan era, Persikabo had not yet merged with PS Tira and was still named Persikabo Bogor.)

Then, only in the Liga Indonesia era which began in 2017, Persikabo Bogor merged with PS Tira in 2019 and formed a new name, PS Tira-Persikabo. In 2020, PS Tira-Persikabo again changed its name to Persikabo 1973.

In the first meeting between Persib and PS Tira-Persikabo in the group phase 2019 Indonesia President's Cup, Persib was defeated by PS Tira-Persikabo with a score of 1–2 at Si Jalak Harupat Stadium, Soreang. PS Tira-Persikabo's goal was scored by Osas Saha at minute 28 and 70 while Persib's goal scored by Kim Jeffrey Kurniawan at minute 48.

The latest match between the two was played in Fixture 29 of 2023–24 Liga 1. Persikabo lost 1—3 to Persib in Kapten I Wayan Dipta Stadium, Gianyar. As of present, it was expected to be the last match between the two teams in league competition as Persikabo 1973 had been relegated to Liga 2 by the end of the season.

== Results ==
Persib win Draw Persikabo win

Competition	Date	Home team	Result	Away team	Venue	Attendance	Ref.
2019 President's Cup	March 2, 2019	Persib	1–2	Persikabo (Note: While in the 2019 President's Cup it was still named PS Tira-Persikabo.)	Si Jalak Harupat Stadium, Soreang		Ref.
2019 Liga 1	June 18, 2019	Persib	1–1	Persikabo	Si Jalak Harupat Stadium, Soreang		Ref.
2019 Liga 1	September 14, 2019	Persikabo	1–1	Persib	Pakansari Stadium, Cibinong		Ref.
2021–22 Liga 1	September 27, 2021	Persib	0–0	Persikabo	Manahan Stadium, Surakarta	Without audience (Note: Due to the COVID-19 pandemic in Indonesia.)	Ref.
2021–22 Liga 1	January 29, 2022	Persikabo	0–1	Persib	Kapten I Wayan Dipta Stadium, Gianyar	Without audience	Ref.
2022–23 Liga 1	December 24, 2022	Persikabo	1–1	Persib	Manahan Stadium, Surakarta	Without audience (Note: Due to the bubble system due to the impact of Kanjuruhan Stadium disaster.)	Ref.
2022–23 Liga 1	April 15, 2023	Persib	1–4	Persikabo	Gelora Bandung Lautan Api Stadium, Bandung		Ref.
2023–24 Liga 1	September 16, 2023	Persib	2–0	Persikabo	Gelora Bandung Lautan Api Stadium, Bandung	7,976	Ref.
2023–24 Liga 1	March 15, 2024	Persikabo	1–3	Persib	Kapten I Wayan Dipta Stadium, Gianyar	Without audience (Note: The match committee does not carry out general ticket sales in any form.)	Ref.

== Statistics ==
As of 15 March 2024

Competition	Matches	Wins		Draws	Goals	
Competition	Matches	Persib	Persikabo	Draws	Persib	Persikabo
Liga 1	8	3	1	4	10	8
Indonesian Cup	0	0	0	0	0	0
President's Cup	1	0	1	0	1	2
Total matches	9	3	2	4	11	10

== Supporters ==
=== Persib ===
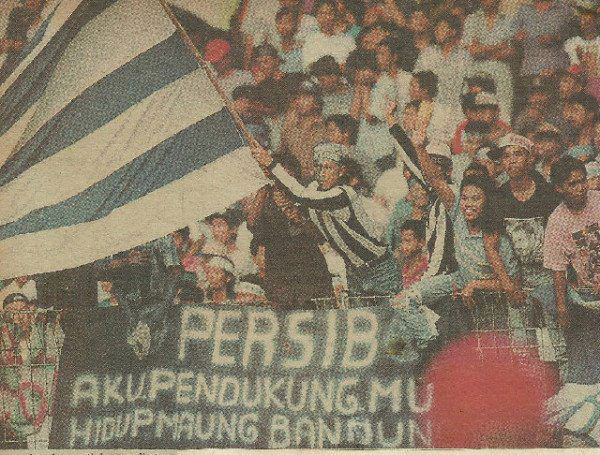
Bobotoh waves the blue and white flag at Gelora Bung Karno Stadium, Jakarta.

Persib has a fanatical supporter named Bobotoh. (Note: "Bobotoh" is a general nickname for Persib fans, both groups and individuals.) Bobotoh comes from Sundanese which means "supporter". Bobotoh has several sub-supporters, namely Flower City Casual (FCC), Viking Persib Club (VPC), La Curva Pasundan, Bomber and others.

Bobotoh spread evenly in almost all regions West Java even has quite a lot of members outside West Java. In fact, one of Bobotoh's sub-supporters, namely Viking Persib Club, is one of the groups of supporters with the most members in Indonesia.

Bobotoh is known to be quite loyal and militant in supporting Persib. In the final match Perserikatan between Persib and PSMS Medan at the Gelora Bung Karno Stadium it was even attended by 150,000 spectators, most of whom were Bobotoh.

=== Persikabo ===
Kabomania and Ultras Persikabo Curva Sud is the main supporter group among other small groups that support Persikabo. The distribution of Persikabo supporter groups is only spread in the areas of Bogor Regency, Bogor City, and partly Depok City. Persikabo's popularity is less popular in Indonesian football, is also one of the factors that some Bogor residents support the Persija Jakarta or Persib Bandung teams which are already well known in Indonesia. Moreover, the two headquarters of the two teams are close to Bogor.

Kabomania itself was founded in 2007 when Persikabo was still competing in the Liga Indonesia First Division. Kabomania is currently chaired by Heri Khaeruman who replaced the previous chairman, Muhammad Yusuf Kiat.

UPCS or the abbreviation of Ultras Persikabo Curva Sud are Persikabo supporters who are ultras culture, it is a culture that originates from Italy. UPCS itself occupies the south stand at Pakansari Stadium or Persikabo Stadium.

== Clashes ==
The feud between Persib and Persikabo supporters actually only occurred in the Liga 1 era and what occurred were usually small to medium scale clashes. Previously, supporters of the two teams had no history of clashes and even the relationship between the two could be said to be good.

=== 2019 Si Jalak Harupat ===
In the Persib match against Tira Persikabo in the continuation of 2019 Liga 1 at the Si Jalak Harupat Stadium, there was a clash between Bobotoh and Kabomania. As a result, hundreds of Kabomania were injured as a result of getting violent actions from Bobotoh elements when the game entered the last minute of the 2nd half.

The attack started with racist shouts from Bobotoh elements in the second west tribune. The majority of victims from Kabomania were dominated by women, many being hit and kicked.

=== 2019 Pakansari ===
Riots occurred again in 2019 Liga 1, Tira Persikabo's home match against Persib which took place at Pakansari Stadium, Cibinong, Bogor Regency, on 14 September 2019 was marked by riots between supporters inside and outside the stadium. This was actually the aftermath of the previous riots.

Before the match, Bobotoh appealed to fellow citizens West Java to support Persib, but this invitation was ignored by Kabomania, a Persikabo supporter. Mutual ridicule occurred until the throwing of stones and chairs occurred which spread to the vandalism of public facilities in Pakansari.

=== 2023 Gelora Bandung Lautan Api ===
In the last match of 2022–23 Liga 1 between Persib against Persikabo at Gelora Bandung Lautan Api Stadium, Persib as the host had to suffer a 1–4 defeat to Persikabo. In the first half Persib lost 0–1, then in the second half, Persib conceded three goals and Persib was only able to reply to one goal. This match was also a farewell moment for I Made Wirawan, the Persib goalkeeper.

When the match ended, Persib fans lit flare and smoke bomb. Initially, flares lit up the north stand. Then, in the other stands also lit up. The north stand of the stadium was filled with smoke. The referee then decided to stop the match.

Persib supporters Bobotoh also invaded the middle of the field. Several Bobotohs came down from the stands to head to the middle of the field. After the flares started to dim, a number of fans appeared to enter the field. They approached and surrounded a number of players. Until finally a number of supporters secured by stewards on the field.

== See also ==
- List of association football club rivalries in Indonesia
- Daan Mogot derby
- Old Indonesia derby
- Super East Java derby
