= List of winners of the Liga Nusantara and predecessors =

Liga Nusantara (3rd tier)

Liga Indonesia Second Division (1994–2007) Liga Indonesia First Division (2008–2014) Liga Nusantara (2015) ISC Liga Nusantara (2016) Liga 3 (2017–2024) Liga Nusantara (2024–present)
- Country
- Indonesia
- Founded
- 1994
- Number of teams
- 24 (2025–26 season)
- Current champions
- RANS Nusantara F.C. (2025–26 season)
- Most successful club
- Persik Kediri; Sumut United (2 titles each)

A national third-tier league of Indonesian football was initially established as the Liga Indonesia Second Division in 1994. Following the formation of the Indonesia Super League in 2008 as the new top-tier competition, the Liga Indonesia First Division was relegated to the third tier. Due to conflicts between Badan Liga Sepakbola Amatir Indonesia (BLAI) and PT Liga Prima Indonesia Sportindo (LPIS), two separate First Division competitions were held during the 2011–12 season—one under the Indonesia Super League (ISL) and the other under the Indonesian Premier League.

In January 2015, PSSI rebranded the First Division as Liga Nusantara after merging the Liga Indonesia First Division, Liga Indonesia Second Division, and Liga Indonesia Third Division into a single league. In January 2017, Liga Nusantara was rebranded as Liga 3. In 2024, the league reverted to its previous name, Liga Nusantara, and is now operated by I-League.

== List of champions by season ==
- Teams marked with an asterisk (*) were not promoted.

Season	Champions (number of titles)	Runners-up	Third place
Liga Indonesia Second Division (1994–2007)
1994–95	Persikabo Bogor	Persiter Ternate	PSPS Pekanbaru
1995–96	Persikota Tangerang	Persewangi Banyuwangi	Persipal Palu*
1996–97	Persipal Palu	Persmin Minahasa	Perserang Serang
1997–98	Competition not held		
1998–99	PS Palembang	PSBL Langsa	Persekaba Badung
1999–2000	Persik Kediri	Perseman Manokwari	
2001	Persela Lamongan	Persim Maros	
2002–03	Persid Jember	Persikad Depok	Persibo Bojonegoro
2003	Persekabpas Pasuruan	Persibom Bolaang Mongondow	PS Mitra Kukar
2004	Persibo Bojonegoro	Persipur Purwodadi	PS Mojokerto Putra
2005	Persiku Kudus	Perserang Serang	PSP Padang
2006	PSIR Rembang	Persipon Pontianak	Persepar Palangkaraya
2007	Persires Rengat	Persewangi Banyuwangi	PSBI Blitar
Liga Indonesia First Division (2008–2014)
2008	PS Mojokerto Putra	PPSM Sakti Magelang	Persidafon Dafonsoro
2009–10	Persekam Metro	Persemalra Southeast Maluku	PSCS Cilacap
2010	PSBS Biak	Persbul Buol	—
2011–12 (LPIS)	Persekap Pasuruan	Persap Purbalingga	—
2012 (BLAI)	Perseka Kaimana	PS Bangka	—
2013	PS Kwarta	Persinga Ngawi	—
2014	Cilegon United	Persibat Batang	—
Liga Nusantara (2015)
2015	Season abandoned due to FIFA suspension of Indonesia		
Liga 3 (2017–2024)
2017	Blitar United	Persik Kendal	Aceh United
2018	Persik Kediri (2)	PSCS Cilacap	—
2019	Persijap Jepara	PSKC Cimahi	—
2020	Cancelled due to COVID-19 pandemic in Indonesia		
2021–22	Karo United	Putra Delta Sidoarjo	—
2022–23	Season abandoned after Kanjuruhan Stadium disaster		
2023–24	Adhyaksa Farmel	Persibo Bojonegoro	—
Liga Nusantara (2024–present)
2024–25	Sumut United (2)	Tornado	Persiba Balikpapan
2025–26	RANS Nusantara	Dejan	PSGC Ciamis
2026-27			

== Other tournaments ==
Several tournaments were organized in the place of a third-tier league during Indonesia's suspension from FIFA between December 2015 and May 2016. The winners are not officially recognized as third-tier champion.

Season	Winners	Runners-up	Third place
2016 ISC Liga Nusantara	Perseden Denpasar	PSN Ngada	Blitar United

== Number of titles overall ==
Clubs in bold are competing in the 2026–27 Liga Nusantara.

Rank	Club	Winners	Winning seasons
1	Persik Kediri	2	1999–2000, 2018
1	Sumut United	2	2024–25, 2021–22
3	RANS Nusantara	1	2025–26
3	Adhyaksa Farmel	1	2023–24
3	Blitar United	1	2018
3	Cilegon United	1	2014
3	**Persekabpas Pasuruan**	1	2003
3	Persekam Metro	1	2009–10
3	Perseka Kaimana	1	2012 (BLAI)
3	Persekap Pasuruan	1	2011–12 (LPIS)
3	Persela Lamongan	1	2001
3	**Persibo Bojonegoro**	1	2004
3	Persid Jember	1	2002–03
3	Persijap Jepara	1	2019
3	Persiku Kudus	1	2005
3	Persikabo Bogor	1	1994–95
3	**Persikota Tangerang**	1	1995–96
3	Persipal Palu	1	1996–97
3	Persires Rengat	1	2007
3	PS Kwarta	1	2013
3	PS Mojokerto Putra	1	2008
3	PS Palembang	1	1998–99
3	PSBS Biak	1	2010
3	PSIR Rembang	1	2006
	**Perseden Denpasar**		2016

Notes:

1. Sumut United were known as Karo United in 2021–22 season.
2. Not an official competition affiliated with PSSI, AFC & FIFA.

== See also ==
- Indonesian football league system
- List of Indonesian football champions
- List of winners of the Championship and predecessors
- List of winners of the Liga 4 and predecessors
- List of winners of the Liga Indonesia Third Division as the fifth tier
