= Kridosono Stadium =

Football stadium in Yogyakarta, Indonesia

Coordinates: 7.7877°S 110.3743°E

- Stadion Kridosono
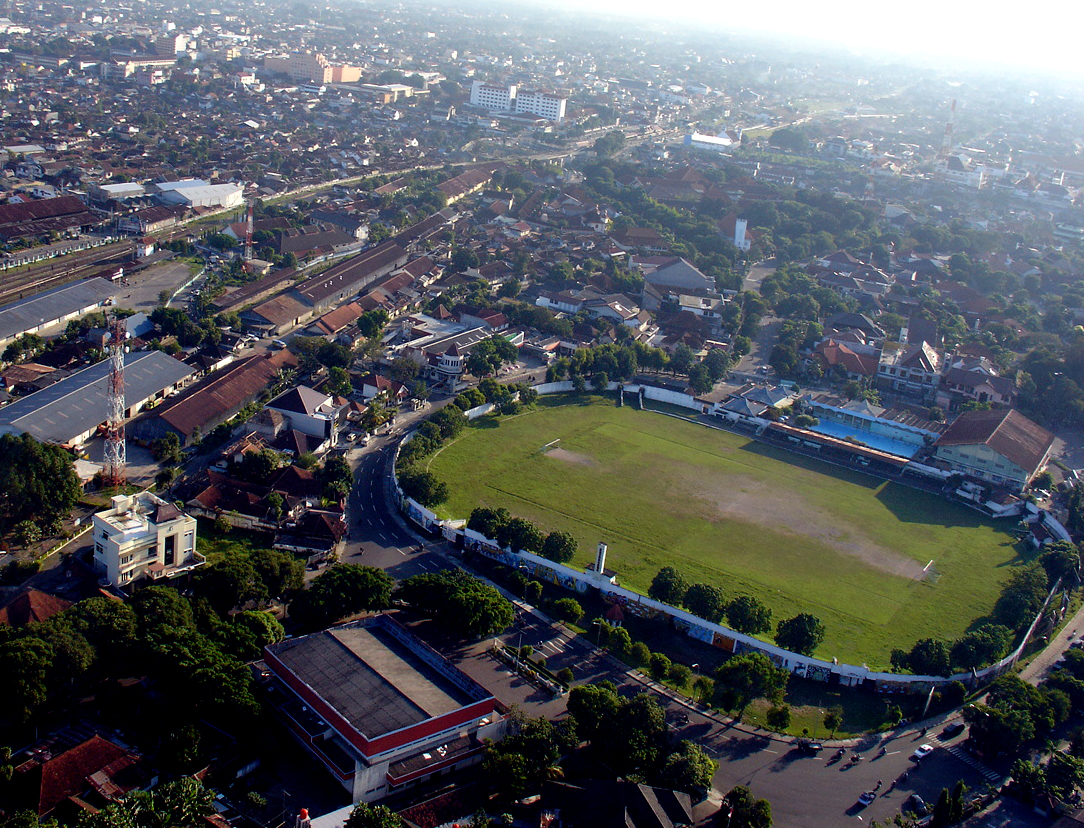
- Interactive map of Kridosono Stadium
- Address: Indonesia
- Location: Jalan Yos Sudarso, Kotabaru, Yogyakarta, Indonesia
- Owner: Yogyakarta Sultanate
- Operator: PT Anindya Mitra Internasional (PT AMI)

Construction
- Built: 1937–1938
- Opened: 27 January 1938
- Renovated: 21 July 1950

Tenant
- PSIM Yogyakarta (until 1984, occasionally thereafter)

Kridosono Stadium (Indonesian: Stadion Kridosono) is a multi-use stadium located in Yogyakarta, Indonesia. It is the oldest football stadium in the Special Region of Yogyakarta. It is used mostly for football matches and also for cultural and music events. It is bordered by three roads: Gondosuli Road to the east, Kenari Road to the south, and Andung Road to the west.

== History ==
The area where Kridosono Stadium stands had formerly been used as a sport hall in Kotabaru, an elite recreational residential area known in colonial times as Nieuwe Wijk. The stadium was built by the Voetbalbond Djokja en Omstreken (VBDO) with permissions granted by Hamengkubuwono VIII and the Yogyakarta Governor Johannes Bijleveld. Construction began in 1937 and was completed in January 1938 with funding of about 9,000 guilders from the Yogyakarta Sultanate. It was inaugurated on 27 January 1938 as Gouverneur Bijleveld-Stadion.

After Indonesia’s independence and following the National Revolution, the stadium was renamed Stadion Kridosono. The renaming was made official on 21 July 1950. The name "Kridosono" literally means wings in motion, symbolizing agility, strength, and spirit.

Kridosono served as the home ground of PSIM Yogyakarta during the Perserikatan era until the Mandala Krida Stadium was completed in 1984. Even after that, PSIM has used Kridosono from time to time.

Since the 1970s, the stadium has been used as a venue for concerts and cultural events. Notable performances include Dream Theater (2017) and Megadeth (2018). In 2024, it hosted the "CRSL Concert #5 The Euphoria" and was scheduled to host Jogjarockarta Festival.

In January 2025, GOR Kridosono (which includes Kridosono Stadium) was officially returned to the ownership of Yogyakarta Sultanate. As part of the transfer, there is a plan to convert the area into a green open space.
