= Savio Sheva =

Indonesian footballer

Personal information
- Full name: Domenico Savio Sheva Maresca Amavisca
- Date of birth: 23 April 2001 (age 25)
- Place of birth: Yogyakarta, Indonesia
- Height: 1.67 m (5 ft 6 in)
- Position: Midfielder

Team information
- Current team: PSIM Yogyakarta
- Number: 8

Youth career
- 2017–2020: PSS Sleman

Senior career*
| Years | Team | Apps | (Gls) |
| 2021– | PSIM Yogyakarta | 75 | (9) |
- * Club domestic league appearances and goals as of 5 September 2026

Domenico Savio Sheva Maresca Amavisca known as Savio Sheva (born 23 April 2001), is an Indonesian professional footballer who plays as a midfielder for Super League club PSIM Yogyakarta.

== Club career ==
Born 23 April 2001. Sheva started his career with the PSS Sleman youth team U-17 in the 2017-2018 Elite Pro Academy. After that Savio played for PSS U-18. He was successfully promoted to the PSS Sleman senior team on March 1, 2021. However, Sheva's time with PSS Sleman was short-lived. He decided to leave PSS Sleman and join PSIM Yogyakarta.

=== PSIM Yogyakarta ===
In 2021, Sheva signed a contract with PSIM Yogyakarta. Sheva made his professional debut with PSIM Yogyakarta in a 0–0 draw against Persis Solo on 12 October 2021, he admitted that he was happy to finally be able to make his professional debut with his hometown team. He finished his first season in the first team with 6 appearances.

On 23 September 2022, he scored his first goal for PSIM in the 86th minute of a 3–1 home win against Persekat Tegal. In his second season with PSIM, Sheva only went on to make 4 appearances and scoring one goal, because Liga 2 was suspended due to a tragedy.

The following year in June 2023, Sheva extended his contract with PSIM Yogyakarta for one season. On 6 November 2023, Sheva scored his first goal of the 2023–24 season for PSIM Yogyakarta in a match against Bekasi City, which ended in a 3–1 lose. On 18 December 2023, he was sent off with a red card in the 97rd minute against Persikab Bandung in a 1–1 draw. On 3 February 2024, Sheva returned to the game after being absent due to a red card suspension, he scored the winning goal in a 1–2 win over PSMS Medan. He finished the following season with only 7 appearances and scoring two goals.

The following year in June 2024, Sheva extended his contract again with PSIM Yogyakarta for one season. On 12 October 2024, Sheva scored his first league goal of the 2024–25 season in a 5–0 win against Persikas Subang. He continued his good form eighth days later with scored one goal in a 0–5 away win against Persiku Kudus. He played with the club all the way to the final of the competition, and managed to become a champion after beating Bhayangkara, while ensuring promotion to Super League next season.

== Honours ==
PSIM Yogyakarta

- Liga 2: 2024–25
