= Andi Irfan =

Indonesian footballer

Personal information
- Date of birth: 25 May 2001 (age 25)
- Place of birth: Polewali Mandar, Indonesia
- Height: 1.61 m (5 ft 3 in)
- Position: Winger

Team information
- Current team: PSIM Yogyakarta
- Number: 17

Youth career
- 2016–2017: Tiga Naga
- 2018: Bhayangkara

Senior career*
Years	Team	Apps	(Gls)
2019–2022	Tiga Naga	9	(0)
2022–2023	Karo United	2	(1)
2023–2024	RANS Nusantara	27	(1)
2024–2025	Madura United	27	(5)
2025–	PSIM Yogyakarta	14	(1)

International career^{‡}
2020	Indonesia U20	3	(0)
- * Club domestic league appearances and goals as of 10 May 2026 ‡ National team caps and goals as of 25 September 2020

Andi Irfan (born 25 May 2001) is an Indonesian professional footballer who plays as a winger for Super League club PSIM Yogyakarta.

== Club career ==
Irfan signed for RANS Nusantara in Liga 1 ahead of the 2023–24 season. He made his debut on 3 July against Persikabo 1973 at the Maguwoharjo Stadium.

On 28 June 2025, Irfan officially signed with Liga 1 club PSIM Yogyakarta.

== International career ==
In August 2020, Irfan was included on Indonesia national under-19 football team 30-man list for Training Center in Croatia. Irfan earned his first U-19 international cap on 5 September 2020 in 3–0 loss against Bulgaria.
