= 1930 Java Championship =

Perserikatan
- Season: 1930
- Champions: Voetbalbond Indies Jakarta (V.I.J.)
- Runner-up: Surabaja Indies Voetbalbond (S.I.V.B.)
- Third place: Bond Mataram; Solo Voetbalbond (S.V.B.)
- Matches played: 3
- Goals scored: 12 (4 per match)

The 1930 Perserikatan season (known as the Java Championship) was the inaugural season of the Indonesian Perserikatan football competition since its establishment in 1930.

It was contested by 4 teams as Bond Mataram, Solo Voetbalbond (S.V.B.), Surabaja Indies Voetbalbond (S.I.V.B.) and Voetbalbond Indies Jakarta (V.I.J.). V.I.J. won the championship.

== Semifinals ==
18 April 1930

Bond Mataram	1 – 1	S.I.V.B.
	Report

Surabaja Indies Voetbalbond (S.I.V.B.) on lots

19 April 1930

V.I.J.	3 – 1	S.V.B.
	Report

== Final ==
20 April 1930

V.I.J.	4 – 2	S.I.V.B.
	Report
