= Yuliana Tasno =

Indonesian association footballer

Personal information
- Full name: Yuliana Tasno
- Date of birth: 19 July 1984 (age 42)
- Place of birth: Indonesia

Yuliana Tasno (born 19 July 1984), also known as Liana Tasno, is the CEO of PSIM Yogyakarta since 2023. She is the first woman to lead this football club. Previously, she served as the Director of Business and had significant responsibility in maintaining the club’s financial stability. In addition, she focused on improving team performance and developing relationships with sponsors. Based in Jakarta, Liana regularly visits Yogyakarta to build strong connections with the PSIM staff and players.
