= 1987–88 PSSI Premier Division =

PSSI Premier Division
- Season: 1987–1988
- Dates: 1 November 1987 – 27 March 1988
- Champions: Persebaya Surabaya
- Top goalscorer: Syamsul Arifin (Persebaya Surabaya) 18 goals

The 1987–88 PSSI Premier Division was a national football tournament organized by PSSI from 1 November 1987 to 27 March 1988. The PSSI Premier Division was the highest tier of the Perserikatan competition.

== First round ==
=== West region ===
Pos	Team	Pld	W	D	L	GF	GA	GD	Pts	Qualification
1	Persija Jakarta	10	5	5	0	22	9	+13	15	Advanced to final round
2	Persib Bandung	10	6	1	3	23	12	+11	13	Advanced to final round
3	PSMS Medan	10	4	5	1	12	8	+4	13	Advanced to final round
4	PSDS Deli Serdang	10	3	3	4	8	13	−5	9	
5	PS Bengkulu	10	1	3	6	10	18	−8	5	
6	Persitara Jakarta Utara	10	1	3	6	8	23	−15	5	Relegated

=== East region ===
Pos	Team	Pld	W	D	L	GF	GA	GD	Pts	Qualification
1	Persebaya Surabaya	10	6	1	3	15	20	−5	13	Advanced to final round
2	Persipura Jayapura	8	3	3	2	21	8	+13	9	Advanced to final round
3	Persiba Balikpapan	8	3	3	2	10	7	+3	9	Advanced to final round
4	PSM Ujungpandang	10	5	0	5	9	13	−4	10	
5	PSIS Semarang	8	2	2	4	8	11	−3	6	
6	Perseman Manokwari	8	1	3	4	9	13	−4	5	Relegated

== Final round ==
Pos	Team	Pld	W	D	L	GF	GA	GD	Pts	Qualification
1	Persebaya Surabaya	5	3	2	0	10	5	+5	8	Advanced to Grand Final
2	Persija Jakarta	5	3	2	0	7	2	+5	8	Advanced to Grand Final
3	Persib Bandung	5	2	3	0	7	4	+3	7	
4	PSMS Medan	5	0	3	2	2	6	−4	3	
5	Persiba Balikpapan	5	0	2	3	3	7	−4	2	
6	Persipura Jayapura	5	0	2	3	6	11	−5	2	

15 Maret 1988

Persebaya Surabaya	2–0	PSMS Medan

Senayan Stadium, Jakarta
15 Maret 1988

Persija Jakarta	2–1	Persipura Jayapura

Senayan Stadium, Jakarta

16 Maret 1988

Persib Bandung	1–0	Persiba Balikpapan

Senayan Stadium, Jakarta

17 Maret 1988

Persija Jakarta	2–0	PSMS Medan

Senayan Stadium, Jakarta
17 Maret 1988

Persebaya Surabaya	4–2	Persipura Jayapura

Senayan Stadium, Jakarta

19 Maret 1988

Persebaya Surabaya	1–0	Persiba Balikpapan

Senayan Stadium, Jakarta
19 Maret 1988

Persib Bandung	1–1	Persija Jakarta

Senayan Stadium, Jakarta

20 Maret 1988

PSMS Medan	1–1	Persipura Jayapura

Senayan Stadium, Jakarta

21 Maret 1988

Persib Bandung	3–3	Persebaya Surabaya

Senayan Stadium, Jakarta
21 Maret 1988

Persija Jakarta	2–0	Persiba Balikpapan

Senayan Stadium, Jakarta

23 Maret 1988

Persib Bandung	0–0	PSMS Medan

Senayan Stadium, Jakarta
23 Maret 1988

Persiba Balikpapan	2–2	Persipura Jayapura

Senayan Stadium, Jakarta

24 Maret 1988

Persija Jakarta	0–0	Persebaya Surabaya

Senayan Stadium, Jakarta

25 Maret 1988

Persib Bandung	2–0	Persipura Jayapura

Senayan Stadium, Jakarta
25 Maret 1988

PSMS Medan	1–1	Persiba Balikpapan

Senayan Stadium, Jakarta

== Grand Final ==
27 March 1988

Persebaya Surabaya	3–2 (a.e.t.)	Persija Jakarta
Budi Johanis (pen.); Mustaqim; Yongky Kastanya		Tiastono Taufik (pen.); Kamaruddin Betay

Senayan Stadium, Jakarta
Attendance: 80,000
