= Jop van der Avert =

Dutch footballer (born 2000)

Personal information
- Date of birth: 11 May 2000 (age 26)
- Place of birth: Bergen op Zoom, Netherlands
- Height: 1.87 m (6 ft 2 in)
- Position: Centre-back

Team information
- Current team: PSIM Yogyakarta
- Number: 2

Youth career
- MOC '17
- –2011: RBC
- 2011–2020: NAC Breda

Senior career*
Years	Team	Apps	(Gls)
2020–2021	Willem II	3	(0)
2021–2025	Dordrecht	108	(3)
2025–2026	Chungbuk Cheongju	19	(0)
2026–	PSIM Yogyakarta	15	(0)
- * Club domestic league appearances and goals as of 5 September 2026

Jop van der Avert (born 11 May 2000) is a Dutch professional football player who plays as a centre-back for Super League club PSIM Yogyakarta.

== Career ==
=== Willem II ===
Born in Bergen op Zoom, North Brabant, Van der Avert began playing football at an early age for local club MOC '17, before being scouted by NAC Breda via the youth department of RBC Roosendaal. In 2020, he signed his first professional contract with Willem II. He made his debut for on 20 September 2020, in a 4–0 home win over Heracles Almelo in the Eredivisie. He came on for Jordens Peters in the 85th minute.

=== Dordrecht ===
On 26 July 2021, Van der Avert signed a two-year contract with Eerste Divisie club Dordrecht after a successful trial, in which he impressed in pre-season friendlies against ASWH and Almere City. He made his competitive debut on 20 August, replacing Seydine N'Diaye in the 63rd minute of a 2–2 home draw against Jong Utrecht.

Van der Avert quickly evolved into a starter for the team at centre-back. On 20 October 2023, he scored his first professional goal in a 4–0 league victory against Jong Ajax, heading in a Jari Schuurman corner-kick; his third assist of the game.

=== Chungbuk Cheongju ===
On 21 January 2025, Dordecht announced van der Avert's transfer to the South Korean club Chungbuk Cheongju.

== Career statistics ==
As of match played 23 December 2023

Appearances and goals by club, season and competition
Club	Season	League			KNVB Cup		Other		Total	
Club	Season	Division	Apps	Goals	Apps	Goals	Apps	Goals	Apps	Goals
Willem II	2020–21	Eredivisie	3	0	0	0	—		3	0
Dordrecht	2021–22	Eerste Divisie	21	0	1	0	—		22	0
Dordrecht	2022–23	Eerste Divisie	35	0	1	0	—		36	0
Dordrecht	2023–24	Eerste Divisie	19	1	2	0	—		21	1
Dordrecht	Total		75	1	4	0	—		79	1
Career total			78	1	4	0	0	0	82	1
