= 1932 Perserikatan =

Indonesian football league season

Perserikatan
- Season: 1932
- Dates: Early 1932 (District Round); 14–16 May 1932 (Final Round)
- Champions: PSIM Yogyakarta
- Runner-up: VIJ Jakarta
- Third place: PSM Madiun

The 1932 PSSI Perserikatan (also called the PSSI Stedenwedstrijden) was an Indonesian football competition organized by the Persatuan Sepakbola Seluruh Indonesia (PSSI). This competition was the second official tournament organized by PSSI following the establishment of the organization on 19 April 1930 in Yogyakarta. PSIM Yogyakarta emerged as the champion of this season's competition.

This second edition served as proof of PSSI's consistency in organizing official competitions following its inaugural tournament in 1931. Holding the final round in Batavia, the seat of the colonial government, held significant meaning as it demonstrated the growing presence of native pribumi football in the public sphere of the Dutch East Indies, while reinforcing PSSI's position as a national organization channeling the sporting aspirations of the Indonesian people in the pre-independence era.

== District Round (Districtswedstrijden) ==
=== West Java District ===
Matches in the West Java district round are not well documented. However, based on available information, VIJ Batavia qualified for the Final Round (Stedenwedstrijden).

=== Central Java District ===
Matches in the Central Java district round are not well documented. However, based on available information, PSIM Yogyakarta qualified for the Final Round (Stedenwedstrijden).

Known Match Results

PSIB Bandung	1–2	PSIM Yogyakarta
	Report

Referee: Widodo Sastrodiningrat

=== East Java District ===
Matches in the East Java district round are not well documented. However, based on available information, PSM Madiun qualified for the Final Round (Stedenwedstrijden).

== Final Round (Stedenwedstrijden) ==
The final round was held on 14–16 May 1932 at the Petojo Field, Laan Trivelli, Batavia.

=== Final Standings ===
Pos	Tim	Main	M	S	K	MG	KM	SG	Poin
1	PSIM Yogyakarta 🏆	2	2	0	0	3	2	+1	4
2	VIJ Jakarta	2	1	0	1	7	4	+3	2
3	PSM Madiun	2	0	0	2	2	7	-5	0

Sumber: Arsip Sepak Bola Indonesia

=== Match Result ===
14 May 1932

VIJ Jakarta	6–2	PSM Madiun
	Report

Laan Trivelli, Batavia
15 May 1932

PSIM Yogyakarta	1–0	PSM Madiun
	Report

Laan Trivelli, Batavia
16 May 1932

VIJ Jakarta	1–2	PSIM Yogyakarta
	Report

Laan Trivelli, Batavia
