= Ghulam Fatkur =

Indonesian association football player

Personal information
- Full name: Ghulam Fatkur Rahman
- Date of birth: 11 April 1999 (age 27)
- Place of birth: Malang, Indonesia
- Height: 1.67 m (5 ft 6 in)
- Position: Central midfielder

Team information
- Current team: PSIM Yogyakarta
- Number: 23

Youth career
- 2016: Tiga Naga
- 2017: PS TNI
- 2017: Bali United

Senior career*
| Years | Team | Apps | (Gls) |
| 2019–2021 | Tiga Naga | 11 | (2) |
| 2021–2022 | Sriwijaya | 3 | (0) |
| 2022– | PSIM Yogyakarta | 44 | (0) |
- * Club domestic league appearances and goals as of 22 May 2026

Ghulam Fatkur Rahman (born 11 April 1999), is an Indonesian professional footballer who plays as a central midfielder for Super League club PSIM Yogyakarta.

== Club career ==
=== PSIM Yogyakarta ===
Ahead of the start of League 2 in 2022, Ghulam Fatkur Rahman joined PSIM Yogyakarta, after previously performing brilliantly for Tiga Naga and Sriwijaya.

== Honours ==
PSIM Yogyakarta

- Liga 2: 2024–25
