= VIJ Stadium =

Sports venue in Jakarta, Indonesia

- Location in Jakarta
- Full name: Voetbalbond Indonesische Jacatra
- Location: Cideng, Gambir, Central Jakarta, Indonesia
- Coordinates: 6.1702417°S 106.8075408°E
- Owner: Jakarta Government
- Capacity: 500
- Surface: Grass

Tenant
- Persija Jakarta (1928–1950)

The VIJ Stadium was a sports venue in Jakarta, Indonesia. It was historically used by the Dutch East Indies football club (Dutch: Voetbalbond Indonesische Jacatra (VIJ)), which was founded in 1928. In 1950, the stadium's tenant club was renamed Persija Jakarta.

VIJ Stadium is part of the football club history of Jakarta, specifically Persija. Before Indonesian independence, the stadium was built to provide a venue for the indigenous youth football club, competing with the Netherlands-aligned club in Indonesia, NIVB. NIVB, or Nederlandsch Indie Voetbal Bond, formed in 1918, consisted of Dutch people and was reportedly anti-indigenous players.

Feeling discriminated against, several Indonesian youth established VIJ in 1928, headquartered in Petojo. As the club's headquarters was at VIJ, this field became known as VIJ Stadium.

The stadium was built with the support of then-Persija builder, M.H. Thamrin, at a cost of 2000 Gulden. It was intended to be fully used by an indigenous football association, becoming the first field used by a native football association in Jakarta, namely VIJ. MH Thamrin's support for VIJ demonstrated his affection for the indigenous people of his birthplace, Jakarta. VIJ symbolized the resistance of indigenous citizens against the colonial government, notably by not using the name of Batavia in its association name. At this stadium, VIJ claimed four championship titles in 1931, 1933, 1934, and 1938, and featured indigenous talents such as Roeljaman, Iskandar, A. Gani, Djaimin, Moestari, and Soetarno. The Petojo field, now named VIJ Field, remains a historical site amidst the city's density. While the trees or cinema buildings like Roxy that once accompanied the pitch are gone, houses in the surrounding rundown settlements now house the groundskeepers.

In 1950, VIJ was officially renamed Persija and moved its base to the Menteng field in Jakarta. VIJ Field continues to stand as a sports facility for the surrounding community. "Until 1980 this field was redeveloped into a stadium. Stake was handed over to the government of Jakarta," said Marlan, a field manager.

According to Marlan, VIJ Stadium is a broad field stadium with a length of 110 meters and width of 70 meters. The available facilities, in addition to the football field, include a locker room and seating with a spectators capacity of approximately 500 people. Uniquely, the south wall of the fence is directly adjacent to residential buildings.

VIJ Field remains in good condition. Although some grass on the pitch looks bare, there are enough support facilities. According to Marlan, during the era of the Dutch government, this field was just a grassy field which served as the base for Club VIJ. In 1980, the field underwent refurbishment and is now under the direct management responsibility of the government of Jakarta.
