= Andi Mattalatta Stadium =

Multi-purpose stadium in South Sulawesi, Indonesia

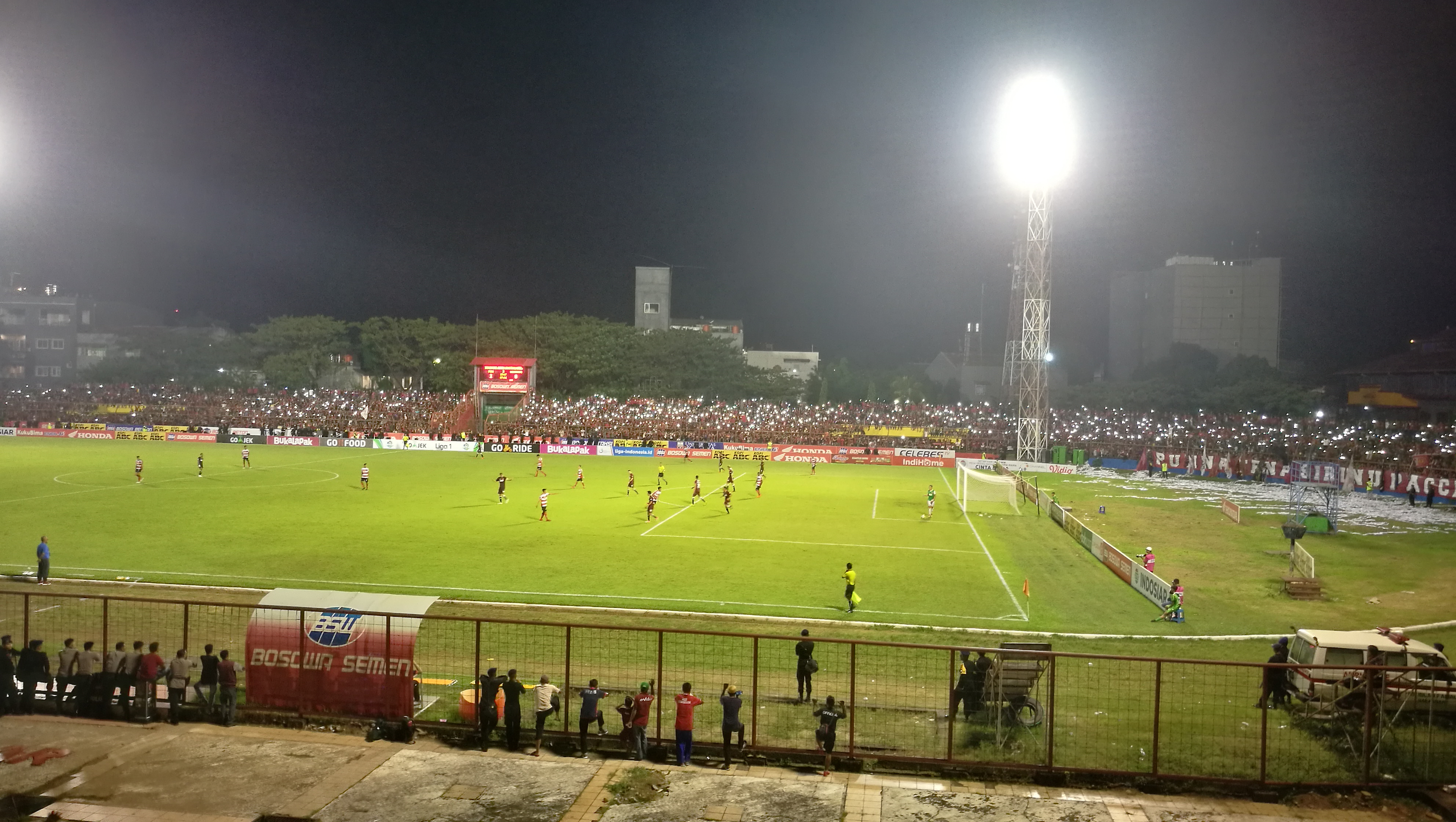
- PSM Makassar vs Madura United in Liga 1 2018

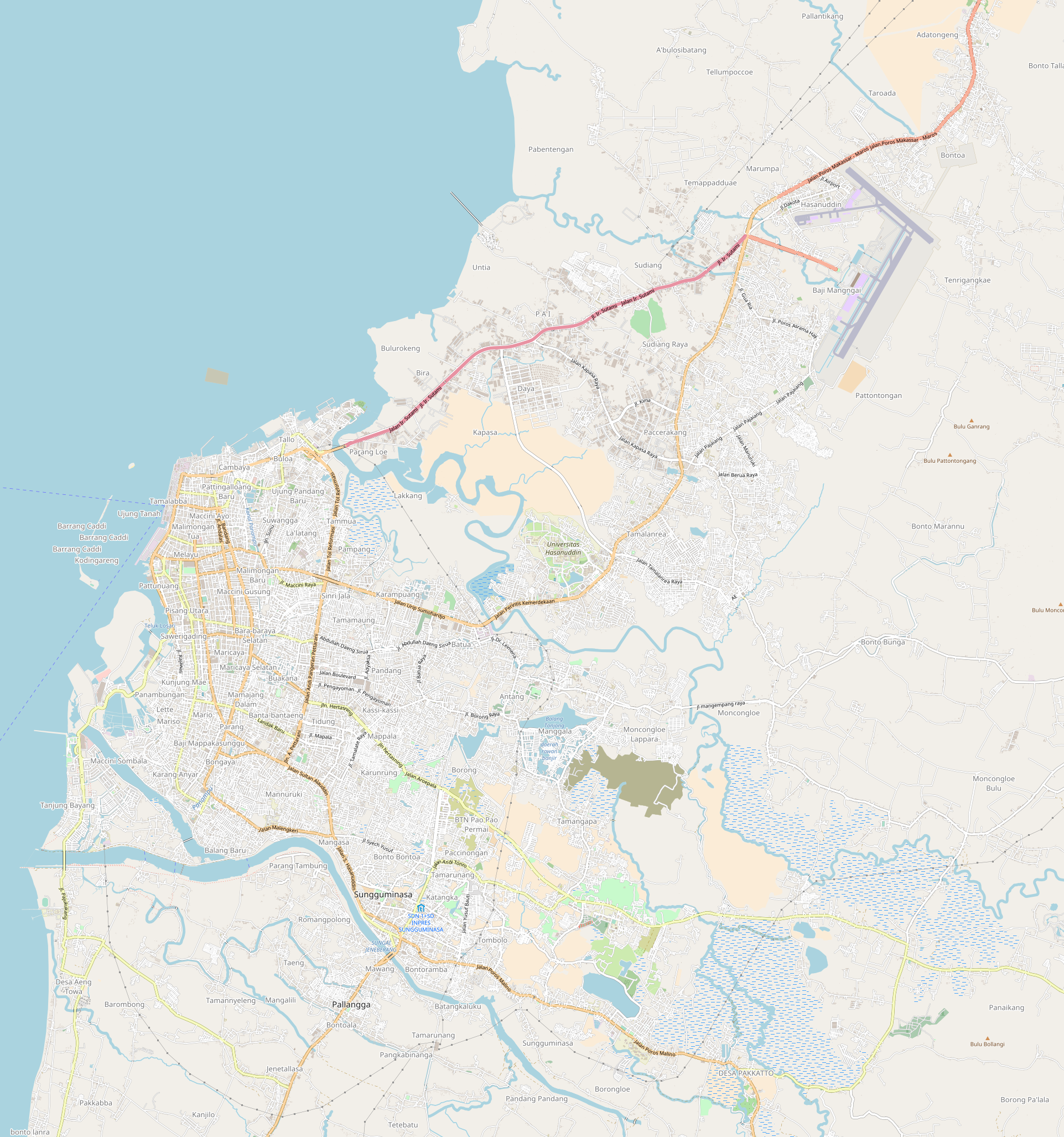
- Location in Makassar Location in Sulawesi Location in Indonesia
- Location: Makassar, South Sulawesi, Indonesia
- Coordinates: 5°09′30.4″S 119°24′55.7″E
- Owner: Government of Makassar City
- Operator: PT. PSM
- Capacity: 15,000

Construction
- Built: 1950
- Opened: 6 July 1957; 69 years ago
- Demolished: 2020

Tenant
- PSM Makassar

Andi Mattalatta Stadium was a multi-purpose stadium in Makassar, South Sulawesi, Indonesia. It was used mostly for football matches. The stadium held 15,000 people and was the home stadium of PSM Makassar. This stadium was the center of the 4th National Sports Week event in 1957. The stadium was inaugurated for use on July 6, 1957 or two months before the opening of the 4th National Sports Week event in 1957 which was held in Makassar.

Historically, this stadium was located on or very near to the Japanese POW camp during World War II.

On 21 October 2020, this stadium was demolished.
