= Dananjaya =

Dananjaya is a surname. Notable people with the surname include:

- Akila Dananjaya (born 1993), Sri Lankan cricketer
- Dulaj Dananjaya (born 1992), Sri Lankan cricketer
- Greshan Dananjaya, Sri Lankan field athlete
- Sagara Dananjaya (born 1981), Sri Lankan cricketer
