= 1931 Perserikatan =

Perserikatan
- Season: 1931
- Dates: April 1931 (District Round); 22–24 May 1931 (Final Round)
- Champions: VIJ Jakarta
- Runner-up: PSIM Yogyakarta
- Third place: VVB Solo

The 1931 PSSI Perserikatan (also called the PSSI Stedenwedstrijden) was an Indonesian football competition organized by the Persatuan Sepakbola Seluruh Indonesia (PSSI). This competition was the first official tournament organized by PSSI following the establishment of the organization on 19 April 1930 in Yogyakarta. VIJ Jakarta emerged as the winner of this season's competition. As PSSI's inaugural official tournament, the 1931 Perserikatan marked a key milestone in launching an independent inter-city competition for native Pribumi players. This initiative established a regular tournament tradition within PSSI that ultimately built the amateur Perserikatan framework—one of the foundational pillars that later merged with the semi-professional Galatama in the 1994–95 season to form the modern Indonesian football league system, Liga Indonesia.

== District Round (Districtswedstrijden) ==
=== District West Java ===
VIJ Jakarta	3	1
BIVB Bandung	1	1

VIJ Jakarta qualified for the Final Round (Stedenwedstrijden)

Match Result

BIVB Bandung	1–3	VIJ Jakarta
	Report

05 April 1931

VIJ Jakarta	1–1	BIVB Bandung
Idris (1-1)	Report	Saban (0-1)

Laan Trivelli, Batavia
Referee: Widodo Sastrodiningrat

=== District Middle Java ===
PPSM Magelang	1	1
PSIM Yogyakarta	1	7

PSIM Yogyakarta qualified for the Final Round (Stedenwedstrijden)

Match Result

PPSM Magelang	1–1	PSIM Yogyakarta
	Report

PSIM Yogyakarta	7–1	PPSM Magelang
	Report

=== District East Java ===
VVB Solo	2	1
SIVB Surabaya	1	0

VVB Solo qualified for the FInal Round (Stedenwedstrijden)

Match Result

VVB Solo	2–1	SIVB Surabaya
	Report

SIVB Surabaya	0–1	VVB Solo
	Report

== Final Round (Stedenwedstrijden) ==
The final round was held on 22–24 May 1931 at the South square of the Keraton Surakarta Hadiningrat, Surakarta.

=== Final Standings ===
Pos	Tim	Main	M	S	K	MG	KM	SG	Poin
1	VIJ Jakarta	2	2	0	0	8	2	+6	4
2	PSIM Yogyakarta	2	1	0	1	5	6	-1	2
3	VVB Solo	2	0	0	2	2	7	-5	0

Sumber: Arsip Sepak Bola Indonesia

==== Match Result ====
22 Mei 1931

VVB Solo	1–4	PSIM Yogyakarta
	Report

South Square of Keraton Surakarta Hadiningrat, Surakarta
Referee: Widodo Sastrodiningrat
23 Mei 1931

VIJ Jakarta	5–1	PSIM Yogyakarta
	Report

South Square of Keraton Surakarta Hadiningrat, Surakarta
Referee: Widodo Sastrodiningrat
24 Mei 1931

VVB Solo	1–3	VIJ Jakarta
? (1-3)	Report	Moetjitabah (0-1); Soemo (0-2), (0-3)

South Square of Keraton Surakarta Hadiningrat, Surakarta
Referee: Widodo Sastrodiningrat
