= Syamsuddin Umar =

Indonesian football manager (born 1955)

Personal information
- Date of birth: 10 November 1955 (age 70)
- Place of birth: Indonesia

Managerial career
- Years: Team
- PSM Makassar

Syamsuddin Umar (born 10 November 1955) is an Indonesian former football manager who last managed PSM Makassar.

== Career ==
Umar managed Indonesian side PSM Makassar, helping them win the league.
