= Badan Liga Sepakbola Amatir Indonesia =

- Founded: 2009
- Folded: 2014
- Country: Indonesia
- Confederation: AFC
- Divisions: First Division; Second Division; Third Division
- Number of clubs: >400
- Level on pyramid: 3–5
- Promotion to: Premier Division
- Most championships: First Division: Persebaya Surabaya (2 titles)
- Website: BLAI.co

The Badan Liga Sepakbola Amatir Indonesia (Indonesian for Amateur Football League Board of Indonesia), commonly known as BLAI, was the league organization that ran the three lowest football divisions in Indonesia, namely First Division, Second Division and Third Division, from 2009. BLAI also managed the youth competition of Indonesian football as Soeratin Cup for under-18 teams and Haornas Cup for under-15 team.

The BLAI was founded in 2009.

Promotion and relegation between the divisions were a central feature of the league: at the end of the season the top clubs of First Division switched with the bottom clubs of the Premier Division (or its predecessors), thus integrating the League into the Indonesian football league system.

== Competition ==
=== League ===
The member clubs of the BLAI were grouped into three divisions: the First Division, Second Division and Third Division. In any given season a club played each of the others in the same division once.

Clubs gained three points for a win (two before 1994) one for a draw, and none for a defeat. At the end of each season, the club who won the First/Second/Third Division final match was crowned champion. As for Second Division, at the lower end sixteen clubs were relegated to Third Division, with the top sixteen Third Division clubs taking their places. As for First Division, at the lower end twelve clubs were relegated to Second Division, with the top twelve Second Division clubs taking their places. At the top end, eight clubs won promotion to the Liga Indonesia Premier Division, while eight teams from the Premier Division joined the First Division in their place.

Promotion and relegation were determined by final league positions.

Youth teams of Liga Indonesia (Super League, Premier Division, First Division, Second Division and Third Division) clubs played in the Soeratin Cup for under-18 team and Haornas Cup for under-15 team.

== 2014 Split ==
On 25 January 2014, PSSI formally dissolved the Badan Liga Sepakbola Amatir Indonesia (BLAI) and the National Futsal Body (BFN) through the executive committee (Exco) meeting at Shangri-La Hotel, Surabaya. Amateur League Board functions will be taken over by the Special Department that manages amateur and youth competitions.

== See also ==
- Indonesian football league system
- Liga Indonesia First Division
- Liga Indonesia Second Division
- Liga Indonesia Third Division
- Soeratin Cup
