= 1934 Perserikatan =

Indonesian football league season

Perserikatan
- Season: 1933–1934
- Dates: 22–25 June (Final tournament)
- Champions: V.I.J.
- Runner-up: Persis Solo
- Third place: S.I.V.B.

The 1933–1934 Perserikatan season was the fifth season of the Indonesian Perserikatan football competition since its establishment in 1930. V.I.J. (Voetbalbond Indonesia Jacatra) is the defending champions won his third league title.

It was the third season competition was organised under the Persatuan Sepakbola Seluruh Indonesia (PSSI). V.I.J. won the championship.

== District tournament ==
The tournament was held at the district level to determine the district champion who would represent the district in the final tournament. Details regarding the tournament format, participants, and match results are very limited due to the scarcity of available sources. All members of PSSI participated in the district-level competition.

=== West Java ===
Participants of the West Java District Final:

- V.I.J.
- P.P.V.I.M.
- PSTS Tasikmalaya
- Persits Tegal
- PSIB Bandung

==== Known Results ====
3 March 1934

PSIB Bandung	D–D	Persits Tegal
	Report

Tegallega Sportpark, Bandung

V.I.J. qualified, P.P.V.I.M. went to the play-off.

=== Midden Java ===
V.V.B. qualified, PSIM Mataram went to the play-off.

=== Oost Java ===
==== Known Results ====
16 September 1933

PSM Madioen	6–1	Djombang
	Report

S.I.V.B. qualified, PSM Madioen went to the play-off.

== Playoff district tournament ==
Participants of the Playoff district tournament:

- P.P.V.I.M.
- PSIM Mataram
- PSM Madioen

PSM Madioen qualified

== Final tournament ==
=== Results ===
22 June 1934

V.V.B.	5–0	PSM Madioen
	Report

Soerakarta
23 June 1934

PSM Madioen	1–4	V.I.J.
	Report

Soerakarta
24 June 1934

V.I.J.	2–2	S.I.V.B.
	Report

Soerakarta
25 June 1934

V.V.B.	3–2	S.I.V.B.
	Report

Soerakarta

=== Final table ===
Pos	Team	Pld	W	D	L	GF	GA	GD	Pts
1	V.I.J. (C)	2	1	1	0	6	3	+3	3
2	V.V.B.	2	2	0	0	8	2	+6	4
3	S.I.V.B.	2	0	1	1	4	5	−1	1
4	PSM Madioen	2	0	0	2	1	9	−8	0

Source: RSSSF,Arsip Sepak Bola Indonesia
(C) Champions
