= 1932–33 Perserikatan =

Indonesian football league season

Perserikatan
- Season: 1932-1933
- Dates: Novemnber 1932 (District Round); 6 May–5 June 1933 (Final Round)
- Champions: VIJ Jakarta
- Runner-up: PSIB Bandung
- Third place: SIVB Surabaya

The 1932–33 PSSI Perserikatan (also called the PSSI Stedenwedstrijden) was an Indonesian football competition organized by the Persatuan Sepakbola Seluruh Indonesia (PSSI). This was the third official competition held by PSSI following the foundation of the organization on April 19, 1930, in Yogyakarta. VIJ Jakarta won the competition this season.

This third edition affirmed PSSI's position as an organization striving to manage national football independently, while reinforcing the role of sports as part of the awakening of national identity under the shadow of colonialism.

== District Round (Districtswedstrijden) ==
=== District West Java ===
Pos	Tim	M	M	S	K	SG	P
1	VIJ Jakarta	3	3	0	0	9-2	6
2	PSIB Bandung	3	2	0	1	4-3	4
3-4	PPSM Magelang	2	0	0	2	3-6	0
3-4	VIS Semarang	2	0	0	2	1-6	0

Source: Arsip Sepak Bola Indonesia

VIJ Jakarta and PSIB Bandung qualified for the Final Round (Stedenwedstrijden)

=== District East Java ===
Pos	Tim	M	M	S	K	SG	P
1-2	SIVB Surabaya	?	?	?	?	?	?
1-2	PSIM Yogyakarta	?	?	?	?	?	?
3-4	VVB Solo	?	?	?	?	?	?
3-4	PSM Madiun	?	?	?	?	?	?

Sorce: Arsip Sepak Bola Indonesia

SIVB Surabaya and PSIM Yogyakarta qualified for the Final Round (Stedenwedstrijden)

== Final Round (Stedenwedstrijden) ==
The final round was held on May 6–7, 1933, for the opening matches (voorwedstrijden) and on June 2–5, 1933, for the championship-deciding matches (kampioenswedstrijden) at the Pasar Turi Field in Surabaya.

=== Final Standings ===
Pos	Tim	Main	M	S	K	MG	KM	SG	Poin
1	VIJ Jakarta 🏆	3	2	1	0	5	2	+3	5
2	PSIB Bandung	3	1	2	0	3	2	+1	4
3	SIVB Surabaya	3	0	2	1	7	8	-1	2
4	PSIM Yogyakarta	3	0	1	2	5	8	-3	1

Source: Arsip Sepak Bola Indonesia

=== Match Result ===
Voorwedstrijden

6 May 1933

PSIM Yogyakarta	4–4	SIVB Surabaya
	Report

Sriwedari Stadium, Yogyakarta
7 May 1933

PSIB Bandung	0–0	VIJ Jakarta
	Report

Tegallega Sportpark, Bandung

Kampioenswedstrijden

2 June 1933

SIVB Surabaya	2–2	PSIB Bandung
	Report

Pasar Turi Field, Surabaya
3 June 1933

PSIM Yogyakarta	0–1	PSIB Bandung
	Report

Pasar Turi Field, Surabaya
4 June 1933

VIJ Jakarta	3–1	PSIM Yogyakarta
	Report

Pasar Turi Field, Surabaya
5 June 1933

SIVB Surabaya	1–2	VIJ Jakarta
	Report

Pasar Turi Field, Surabaya
