= Perserikatan =

Association football tournaments in Indonesia

Perserikatan was the national amateur football competitions in Indonesia held between 1931 and 1994 before the formation of Liga Indonesia, organized by the PSSI, the Indonesian football federation. The competition involved hundreds clubs in Indonesia and was divided into several levels.

In English, the term Perserikatan may literally translate to inter-association football championship as this competition involved all regional-level football associations in Indonesia.

Since 1979, in parallel, another national football league, Galatama (The Premier League), was established for semi professional football clubs. Therefore, before both Perserikatan and Galatama were merged into a new system called Liga Indonesia in 1994, both of these competitions existed in parallel.

== History ==
The competition traces its origins back to 19 April 1930. Some of Dutch East Indies prominent football club, like VIJ Jakarta, BIVB Bandung, IVBM Magelang, MVB Madiun, SIVB Surabaya and VVB Solo, met and discussed about the future championship on the Netherlands territory. They met at Societeit Hadiprojo, Yogyakarta.

After the meeting, it was agreed that these clubs would found Persatoean Sepak Raga Seloeroeh Indonesia, the parent organization for the teams.

Before Perserikatan was established, a nationwide football competition had already existed within the colonial football structure of the Dutch East Indies. The inter-city championship, which began in 1914 under the administration of the Nederlands Indische Voetbal Bond (NIVB), was initially dominated by European groups. However, by the late 1920s, the competition had become more open, with participating teams allowing players from various ethnic backgrounds including Chinese and pribumi to play together within the same team.

From 1951 to 1979, Perserikatan was officially named as the Kejurnas PSSI (PSSI National Championship). From 1980 to 1994, it was referred to as Divisi Utama PSSI (PSSI Premier Division). In 1994, after being held for approximately 60 seasons (with some breaks in between, such as during the Japanese occupation of the Dutch East Indies and Indonesian National Revolution periods), it was merged with Galatama to form new fully professional league, the Liga Indonesia.

== List of champions ==
| Season | Champions | Runners-up |
|---|---|---|
| 1930 (Note: The 1930 season was an unofficial tournament.) | VIJ Batavia | SIVB Surabaya |
| 1931 | VIJ Batavia | PSIM Yogyakarta |
| 1932 | PSIM Yogyakarta | VIJ Batavia |
| 1932–33 | VIJ Batavia | PSIB Bandung |
| 1933–34 (Note: The PSSI 50th anniversary book erroneously lists the venue of the tournament as Bandung and its runners-up as Persib (Bandoeng).) | VIJ Batavia | VVB Solo |
| 1934–35 | Persis Solo | PPVIM Meester Cornelis |
| 1935–36 | Persis Solo | Persib Bandung |
| 1936–37 | Persib Bandung | Persis Solo |
| 1937–38 | VIJ Batavia | Persibaya Surabaya |
| 1938–39 | Persis Solo | PSIM Yogyakarta |
| 1939–40 | Persis Solo | PSIM Yogyakarta |
| 1940–41 | Persis Solo | Persibaya Surabaya |
| 1941–43 (Note: Per Arsip Sepak Bola Indonesia. RSSSF claims this season was split into the 1941–42 and 1942–43 seasons when Persis was the champion on both while Persibaya was the runner-up in 1941–42 and PSIM in 1942–43.) | PSIM Yogyakarta | Persis Solo |
| 1944–49 | Not held | |
| 1949–50 (Note: The 1950 season was an unofficial tournament called Turnamen Kongres PSSI (PSSI Congress Tournament). RSSSF claims this season was the last in the Dutch East Indies era.) | Persib Bandung | Persibaya Surabaya |
| 1951 | Persibaya Surabaya | PSM Makassar |
| 1952 | Persibaya Surabaya | Persija Jakarta |
| 1953–54 | Persija Jakarta | PSMS Medan |
| 1955–57 | PSM Makassar | PSMS Medan |
| 1957–59 | PSM Makassar | Persib Bandung |
| 1959–61 | Persib Bandung | PSM Makassar |
| 1962–64 | Persija Jakarta | PSM Makassar |
| 1964–65 | PSM Makassar | Persebaya Surabaya |
| 1965–66 | PSM Makassar | Persib Bandung |
| 1966–67 | PSMS Medan | Persib Bandung |
| 1967–69 (Note: Per some sources but it is not listed in the PSSI 50th anniversary book. RSSSF claims this season was not held.) | PSMS Medan | Persija Jakarta |
| 1969–71 | PSMS Medan | Persebaya Surabaya |
| 1971–73 | Persija Jakarta | Persebaya Surabaya |
| 1973–75 | Persija Jakarta and PSMS Medan | |
| 1975–78 | Persebaya Surabaya | Persija Jakarta |
| 1978–79 | Persija Jakarta | PSMS Medan |
| 1980 | Persiraja Banda Aceh | Persipura Jayapura |
| 1981–82 | Not held | |
| 1983 | PSMS Medan | Persib Bandung |
| 1984 | Not held | |
| 1985 | PSMS Medan | Persib Bandung |
| 1986 | Persib Bandung | Perseman Manokwari |
| 1986–87 | PSIS Semarang | Persebaya Surabaya |
| 1987–88 | Persebaya Surabaya | Persija Jakarta |
| 1988–89 | Not held | |
| 1989–90 | Persib Bandung | Persebaya Surabaya |
| 1990–91 | Not held | |
| 1991–92 | PSM Ujungpandang | PSMS Medan |
| 1992–93 | Not held | |
| 1993–94 | Persib Bandung | PSM Ujungpandang |
