= PSIM Yogyakarta =

Indonesian football club

- Full name: Perserikatan Sepakbola Indonesia Mataram
- Nicknames: Laskar Mataram (Mataram Warriors); Parang Biru (Blue Parang)
- Short name: PSIM; JOG
- Founded: 5 September 1929; 97 years ago as Perserikatan Sepak Raga Mataram (PSM); 27 July 1930; 96 years ago as Perserikatan Sepakbola Indonesia Mataram (PSIM)
- Ground: Sultan Agung Stadium at Bantul
- Capacity: 30.000
- Owner: PT PSIM Jaya Yogyakarta
- President: Yuliana Tasno
- Head Coach: Risto Vidaković
- League: Super League
- 2025–26: Super League, 11th of 18
- Website: www.psimjogja.id
Home colours	Away colours

Perserikatan Sepakbola Indonesia Mataram (Hanacaraka: ꦥꦼꦂꦱꦠꦸꦮꦤ꧀ꦱꦼꦥꦏ꧀ꦧꦺꦴꦭꦆꦤ꧀ꦢꦺꦴꦤꦺꦱꦶꦪꦩꦠꦫꦩ꧀ꦔꦪꦺꦴꦒꦾꦏꦂꦠ, lit. 'Mataram Indonesian Football Association'), commonly known as PSIM Yogyakarta or simply PSIM, is an Indonesian professional football club based in Yogyakarta that competes in the Super League from 2025–26, the top tier of Indonesian football after promotion from Liga 2 in 2024–25. The club play their home match in Mandala Krida. Nicknamed Laskar Mataram, they were founded as Perserikatan Sepakraga Mataram in 1929, but changed their name to PSIM one year after. PSIM is also one of the founders of Indonesian football association PSSI, along with six other clubs.

== History ==
The history of PSIM began on 5 September 1929 with the birth of a football organization called the Perserikatan Sepak Raga Mataram (PSM). The name Mataram was used because Yogyakarta was the center of the Mataram Sultanate. On 27 July 1930 the name PSM was changed to Perserikatan Sepakbola Indonesia Mataram (PSIM), as a demand for the national movement to achieve Indonesian independence.

On 19 April 1930, PSIM together with VIJ Jakarta (now Persija Jakarta), BIVB Bandung (Persib Bandung), MIVB (PPSM Magelang), MVB (PSM Madiun), SIVB (Persebaya Surabaya), and VVB (Persis Solo), attended the establishment meeting of the PSSI held in Yogyakarta.

In the 1970s, PSIM could not do much at the main domestic competition, but they scored the only goal against a semi-professional club from Australia who was on a tour in Indonesia. PSIM participated in Diklat Salatiga and lost the match 1–5. Another achievement was when they defeated the Indonesia national team which was managed by Yanek Marota from Poland in a friendly match at the Kridosono Stadium. The final result was 1–0.

Since the Indonesian league started in 1994, PSIM's achievements have experienced ups and downs marked by the ups and downs. PSIM was relegated in the 1994–95 Liga Indonesia Premier Division and promoted two years later. After competing for three seasons in the premier division, PSIM again had to be relegated in the 1999–2000 Liga Indonesia Premier Division.

Three years later, in Division 1 Liga Indonesia 2003, PSIM began to rise again and had a target for promotion with a well-prepared team. In the preliminary round PSIM beat the favorite team Persebaya twice in away matches with a landslide score of 3–1 and 3–0, and won group C. However, PSIM failed to continue its dominance in the last 8 round. They had to settle for 4th place, and participated in the playoffs. Played in Solo, PSIM was unable to compete with Persela Lamongan.

in 2005, they qualified for the 2006 Liga Indonesia Premier Division after beating Persiwa Wamena at the Jalak Harupat Stadium with a score of 2–1.

Liana Tasno was appointed to succeed Bima Sinung as the club's director in August 2023. She was the first woman who took on this role.

On 17 February 2025, PSIM secured a promotion to Liga 1 for next season after defeating PSPS Pekanbaru 2-1 in final matchweek of Group X at Mandala Krida Stadium and ended 18 years stay in the second division. 9 days later on 26 February 2025, PSIM became the champions of Liga 2 after defeating Bhayangkara Presisi Indonesia 2-1 with two goals from Rafinha and Roken Tampubolon and secured their second title in second tier since 2005.

== Season-by-season records ==
Season	League	Tier	Pos	P	W	D	L	GF	GA	Pts	Piala Indonesia	I-League Cup
1994–95	Premier Division	1	17th East	32	2	12	18	14	48	18		
1996	First Division	2										
1997	First Division	2	2nd									
1997–98	Premier Division	1	abandoned									
1998–99	Premier Division	1	5th Group 3	10	2	2	6	7	11	8		
1999–2000	Premier Division	1	14th East	26	4	7	15	15	50	19		
2001	First Division	2	3rd Group Central I	8	2	2	4	8	10	8		
2002	First Division	2	5th Group 2	12	4	4	4	11	11	16		
2003	First Division	2	3rd Promosi play off	27	14	4	9	37	34	46		
2004	First Division	2	6th West	22	9	6	7	29	23	33		
2005	First Division	2	1st	19	13	4	2	36	18	43	R2	
2006	Premier Division	1	14th West	26	7	5	14	23	43	26	R1	
2007–08	Premier Division	1	15th East	34	8	8	18	30	45	32		
2008–09	Premier Division	2	12th Group 2	26	7	4	15	20	36	25	R1	
2009–10	Premier Division	2	7th Group 3	20	6	5	9	22	31	23	A	
2010–11	Premier Division	2	5th Group 2	24	12	3	9	26	22	39	NH	
2011–12	Premier Division (LI)	2	4th	26	12	6	8	32	27	42	A	
2013	Premier Division (LI)	2	4th Group 5	12	5	2	5	20	18	17	NH	
2014	Premier Division	2	4th Group 5	12	3	6	3	15	13	15	NH	
2015	Premier Division	2	abandoned								NH	
2016	Indonesia Soccer Championship B	2	3rd Second round (Group A)								NH	
2017	Liga 2	2	1st Relegation play-off	17	8	3	6	26	20	27	NH	
2018	Liga 2	2	6th East	22	12	4	6	31	29	31	R2	
2019	Liga 2	2	7th East	20	9	0	11	21	23	27	NH	
2020	Liga 2	2	abandoned								NH	
2021–22	Liga 2	2	4th	15	6	6	3	15	12	24	NH	
2022–23	Liga 2	2	abandoned								NH	
2023–24	Liga 2	2	3rd Championship Round (Group X)	18	8	6	4	20	18	30	NH	
2024–25	Liga 2	2	1st	23	14	5	4	40	12	47	NH	
2025–26	Super League	1	11th	34	11	12	11	43	44	45	NH	
2026–27	Super League	1		34							NH	

== Players ==
=== Current squad ===
As of August 2026

Note: Flags indicate national team as defined under FIFA eligibility rules; some limited exceptions apply. Players may hold more than one non-FIFA nationality.

No.	Pos.	Nation	Player
2	DF	NED	Jop van der Avert
3	DF	JPN	Yusaku Yamadera
5	DF	ARG	Franco Ramos (captain)
6	MF	IDN	Muhammad Iqbal
7	FW	CRC	Marvin Loría
8	MF	IDN	Savio Sheva
9	FW	PAR	Mauro Caballero
10	MF	POR	Zé Valente
11	MF	ARG	Ezequiel Vidal
13	MF	POL	Adrian Purzycki
14	DF	IDN	Rendra Teddy
15	DF	IDN	Raka Cahyana
17	MF	IDN	Andi Irfan

No.	Pos.	Nation	Player
19	GK	IDN	Cahya Supriadi
20	FW	ESP	Adrián Dalmau
21	MF	IDN	Diandra Diaz
23	MF	IDN	Ghulam Fatkur
24	DF	CZE	Ondřej Rudzan
25	DF	IDN	Alwi Fadilah
26	GK	IDN	Harlan Suardi
27	MF	IDN	Riyatno Abiyoso
29	DF	IDN	Rio Hardiawan
47	GK	IDN	Khairul Fikri
52	MF	IDN	Ahmad Agung
73	GK	IDN	Athaullah Daib
99	FW	SLO	Nermin Haljeta

=== Out on loan ===
Note: Flags indicate national team as defined under FIFA eligibility rules; some limited exceptions apply. Players may hold more than one non-FIFA nationality.

No.	Pos.	Nation	Player
35	DF	IDN	Reva Adi Utama (at Borneo Samarinda)

=== Retired numbers ===
- 1 – The 12th man, reserved for club supporters "Brajamusti"
- 12 – The 12th man, reserved for club supporters "The Maident"
- 91 – Rafinha

== Coaching staff ==
Position	Name
Head coach	(Serbia) Risto Vidaković
Assistant coaches	(Bosnia and Herzegovina) Edin Prljača
Assistant coaches	(Indonesia) Guntur Cahyo Utomo
Assistant coaches	(Indonesia) Ixsan Fajar Pranoto
Goalkeeping coach	(Italy) Mario Capece
Physical coach	(Spain) Jorge Gómez
Analyst	(Indonesia) Aprian Pamungkas

== Honours ==
- Liga Indonesia First Division/Liga 2
  - Winners (2): 2005, 2024–25
  - Runner-up (1): 1996-97
- Perserikatan
  - Winners (2): 1932, 1941-1943
  - Runner-up (3): 1931, 1938-39, 1939-40
