= Veneration of the dead =

Cultural or religious practice

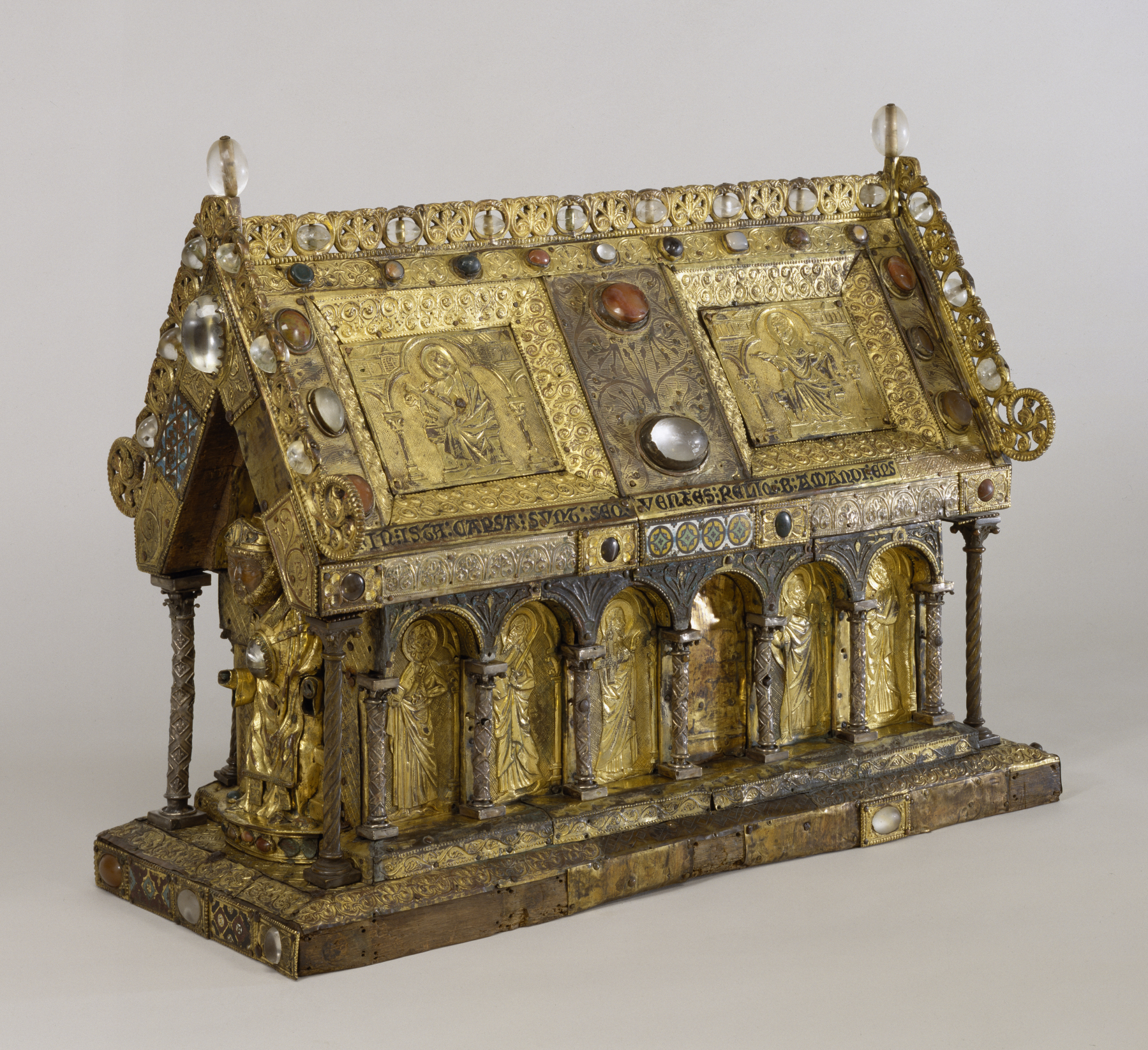
Shrine of Saint Amandus

The veneration of the dead, including one's ancestors, is based on love and respect for the deceased. In some cultures, it is related to beliefs that the dead have a continued existence, and may possess the ability to influence the fortune of the living. Some groups venerate their direct, familial ancestors. Certain religious groups, in particular the Eastern Orthodox Churches, Anglican Church, and Catholic Church venerate saints as intercessors with God; the latter also believes in prayer for departed souls in Purgatory. Other religious groups, consider veneration of the dead to be idolatry and a sin.

In European, Asian, Oceanian, African and Afro-diasporic cultures, the goal of ancestor veneration is to ensure the ancestors' continued well-being and positive disposition towards the living, and sometimes to ask for special favours or assistance. The social or non-religious function of ancestor veneration is to cultivate kinship values, such as filial piety, family loyalty, and continuity of the family lineage. Ancestor veneration occurs in societies with every degree of social, political, and technological complexity, and it remains an important component of various religious practices in modern times.

== Overview ==
Ancestor reverence is not the same as the worship of a deity or deities. In some Afro-diasporic cultures, ancestors are seen as being able to intercede on behalf of the living, often as messengers between humans and God. As spirits who were once human themselves, they are seen as being better able to understand human needs than would a divine being. In other cultures, such as those that have been greatly influenced by the teachings of Confucius, asking for favors is secondary to expressing filial piety. Some cultures believe that their ancestors actually need to be provided for by their descendants, and their practices include offerings of food and other provisions. Others do not believe that the ancestors are even aware of what their descendants do for them, but that the expression of filial piety is what is important.

Most cultures with these practices do not call them "ancestor worship" in the sense of the reverence, love, or devotion accorded a deity or God. The phrase ancestor veneration may convey a more accurate sense of how the Chinese, other Buddhist or Confucian-influenced societies, or other African or European cultures perceive these practices. These acts may not reflect a belief that the departed ancestors have become some kind of deity, but rather show filial piety, devotion, and respect. They may aim to look after ancestors in their afterlives or seek their guidance.

Although there is no generally accepted theory concerning the origins of ancestor veneration, this social phenomenon appears in some form in all human cultures documented so far. David-Barrett and Carney claim that ancestor veneration might have served a group coordination role during human evolution, and thus it was the mechanism that led to religious representation fostering group cohesion.

== West and Southeast African cultures ==
Ancestor veneration is prevalent throughout Africa, and serves as the basis of many religions. It is often augmented by a belief in a supreme being, but prayers and/or sacrifices are usually offered to the ancestors who may ascend to becoming a kind of minor deities themselves. Ancestor veneration remains among many Africans, sometimes practiced alongside the later adopted religions of Christianity (as in Nigeria among the Igbo people), and Islam (among the different Mandé peoples and the Bamum and the Bakossi people) in much of the continent. In orthodox Serer religion, the pangool is venerated by the Serer people.

=== Serer of Senegal and Gambia ===
The Seereer people of Senegal, The Gambia and Mauritania who adhere to the tenets of A ƭat Roog (Seereer religion) believe in the veneration of the pangool (ancient Seereer saints and/or ancestral spirits). There are various types of pangool (singular: fangol), each with its own means of veneration.

=== Madagascar ===
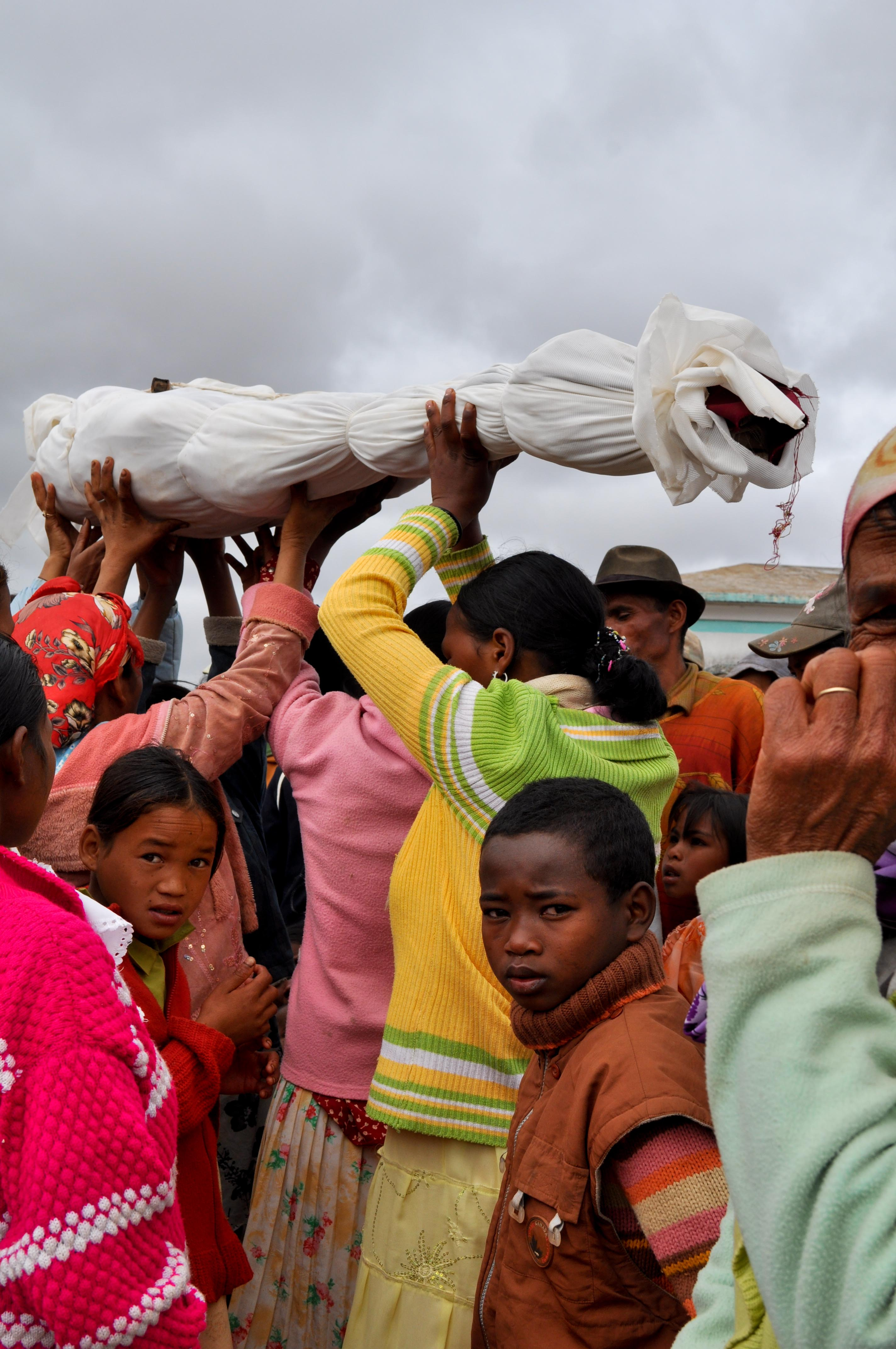
Famadihana reburial ceremony

Veneration of ancestors is prevalent throughout the island of Madagascar. Approximately half of the country's population of 20 million currently practice traditional religion, which tends to emphasize links between the living and the razana (ancestors). The veneration of ancestors has led to the widespread tradition of tomb building, as well as the highlands practice of the famadihana, whereby a deceased family member's remains may be exhumed to be periodically re-wrapped in fresh silk shrouds before being replaced in the tomb. The famadihana is an occasion to celebrate the beloved ancestor's memory, reunite with family and community, and enjoy a festive atmosphere. Residents of surrounding villages are often invited to attend the party, where food and rum are typically served and a hiragasy troupe or other musical entertainment is commonly present.

Veneration of ancestors is also demonstrated through adherence to fady, taboos that are respected during and after the lifetime of the person who establishes them. It is widely believed that by showing respect for ancestors in these ways, they may intervene on behalf of the living. Conversely, misfortunes are often attributed to ancestors whose memory or wishes have been neglected. The sacrifice of zebu is a traditional method used to appease or honor the ancestors. Small, everyday gestures of respect include throwing the first capful of a newly opened bottle of rum into the northeast corner of the room to give the ancestors their due share.

== North Africa ==
In Egypt, a form of adorcism entwined with veneration of the dead, which one academic referred to as "ghost riders". A ghost who came to possess a person would be honored with a dedicated grave monument or sanctuary, where locals would make offerings and swear oaths. Those who swore false oaths may be punished by the ghost in residence. This ghost was considered both powerful and something for others to fear. These ghosts are not necessarily saints (in fact, those who hold these beliefs believe very holy persons never possess others in this way, as they are always in the presence of God), but like saints, they function as intermediaries with God. In some cases these may be family shrines, which are not frequented by outsiders, but some (usually older shrines) are frequented by many. When asking for aid from one of these spirits, one may often pledge an animal sacrifice upon aid being rendered, which is also done with saints.

== Asian cultures ==
=== Cambodia ===
During Pchum Ben and the Cambodian New Year people make offerings to their ancestors. Pchum Ben is a time when many Cambodians pay their respects to deceased relatives of up to seven generations. Monks chant the suttas in Pali language overnight (continuously, without sleeping) in prelude to the gates of hell opening, an event that is presumed to occur once a year, and is linked to the cosmology of King Yama originating in the Pali Canon. During this period, the gates of hell are opened and ghosts of the dead (preta) are presumed to be especially active. In order to combat this, food-offerings are made to benefit them, some of these ghosts having the opportunity to end their period of purgation, whereas others are imagined to leave hell temporarily, to then return to endure more suffering; without much explanation, relatives who are not in hell (who are in heaven or otherwise reincarnated) are also generally imagined to benefit from the ceremonies.

=== China ===
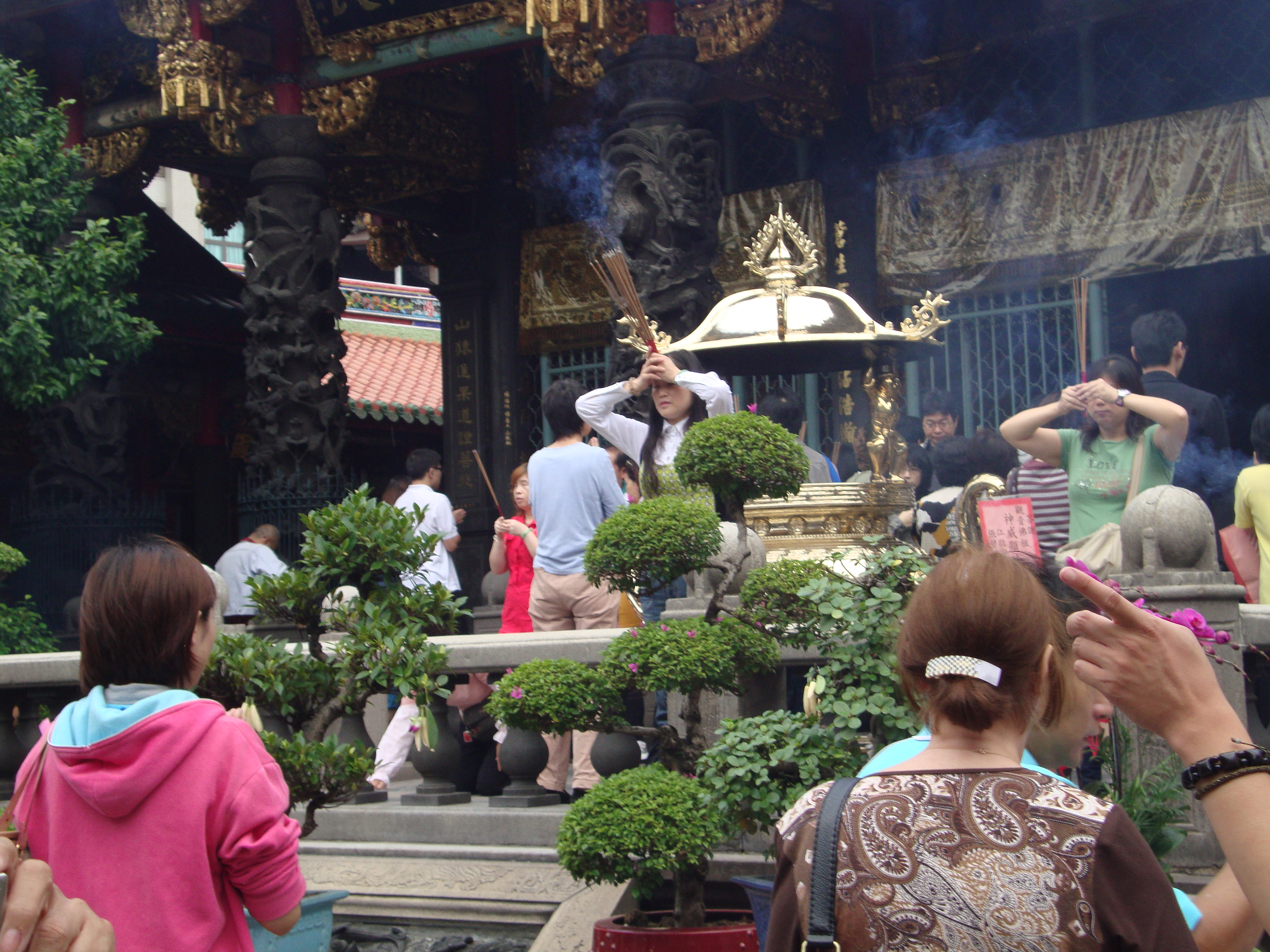
Burning of incense during a veneration at Mengjia Longshan Temple, which is dedicated to Guan Yu, Mazu, and others

In China, ancestor veneration (敬祖, pinyin: jìngzǔ) and ancestor worship (拜祖, pinyin: bàizǔ) seek to honour and recollect the actions of the deceased; they represent the ultimate homage to the dead. The importance of paying respect to parents (and elders) lies with the fact that all physical bodily aspects of one's being were created by one's parents, who continued to tend to one's well-being until one was on firm footing. The respect and homage to parents is to return this gracious deed to them in life and after. The shi (尸; "corpse, personator") was a Zhou dynasty (1045–256 BCE) sacrificial representative of a dead relative. During a shi ceremony, the ancestral spirit supposedly would enter the personator, who would eat and drink sacrificial offerings and convey spiritual messages. Spiritual messages usually were conveyed in the form of poe divination, or to confirm whether the ancestors consent on the messages requested by the divinator.

==== Offerings ====
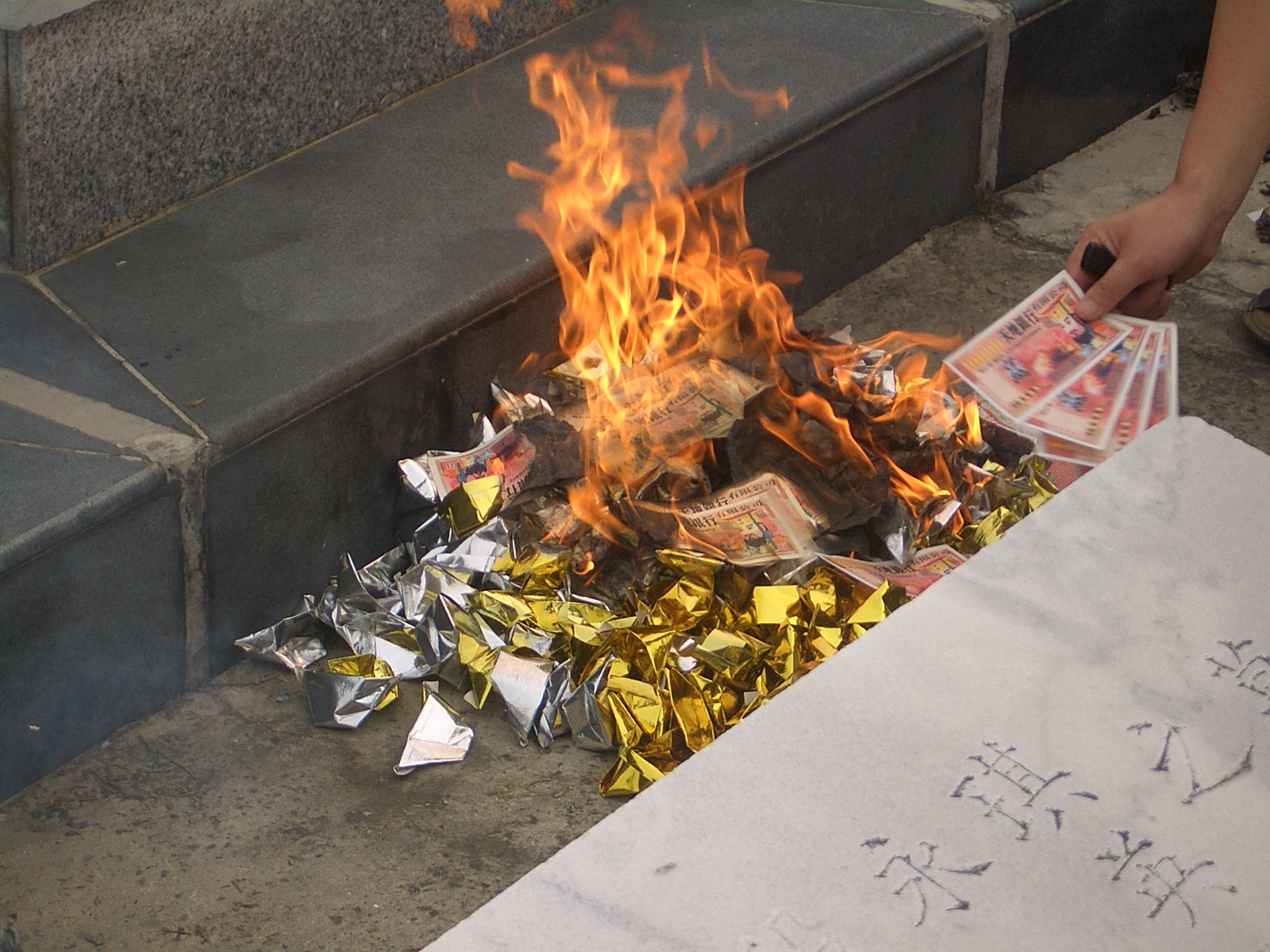
Burning offerings

In traditional Chinese culture, sacrifices are sometimes made to altars as food for the deceased. This falls under the modes of communication with the Chinese spiritual world concepts. Some of the veneration includes visiting the deceased at their graves, and making or buying offerings for the deceased in the Spring, Autumn, and Ghost Festivals. Due to the hardships of the late 19th- and 20th-century China, when meat and poultry were difficult to come by, sumptuous feasts are still offered in some Asian countries as a practice to the spirits or ancestors. However, in the orthodox Taoist and Buddhist rituals, only vegetarian food would suffice. For those with deceased in the afterlife or hell, elaborate or even creative offerings, such as servants, refrigerators, houses, car, paper money and shoes are provided so that the deceased will be able to have these items after they have died. Often, paper versions of these objects are burned for the same purpose. Originally, real-life objects were buried with the dead. In time these goods were replaced by full size clay models which in turn were replaced by scale models, and in time today's paper offerings (including paper servants).

=== India ===
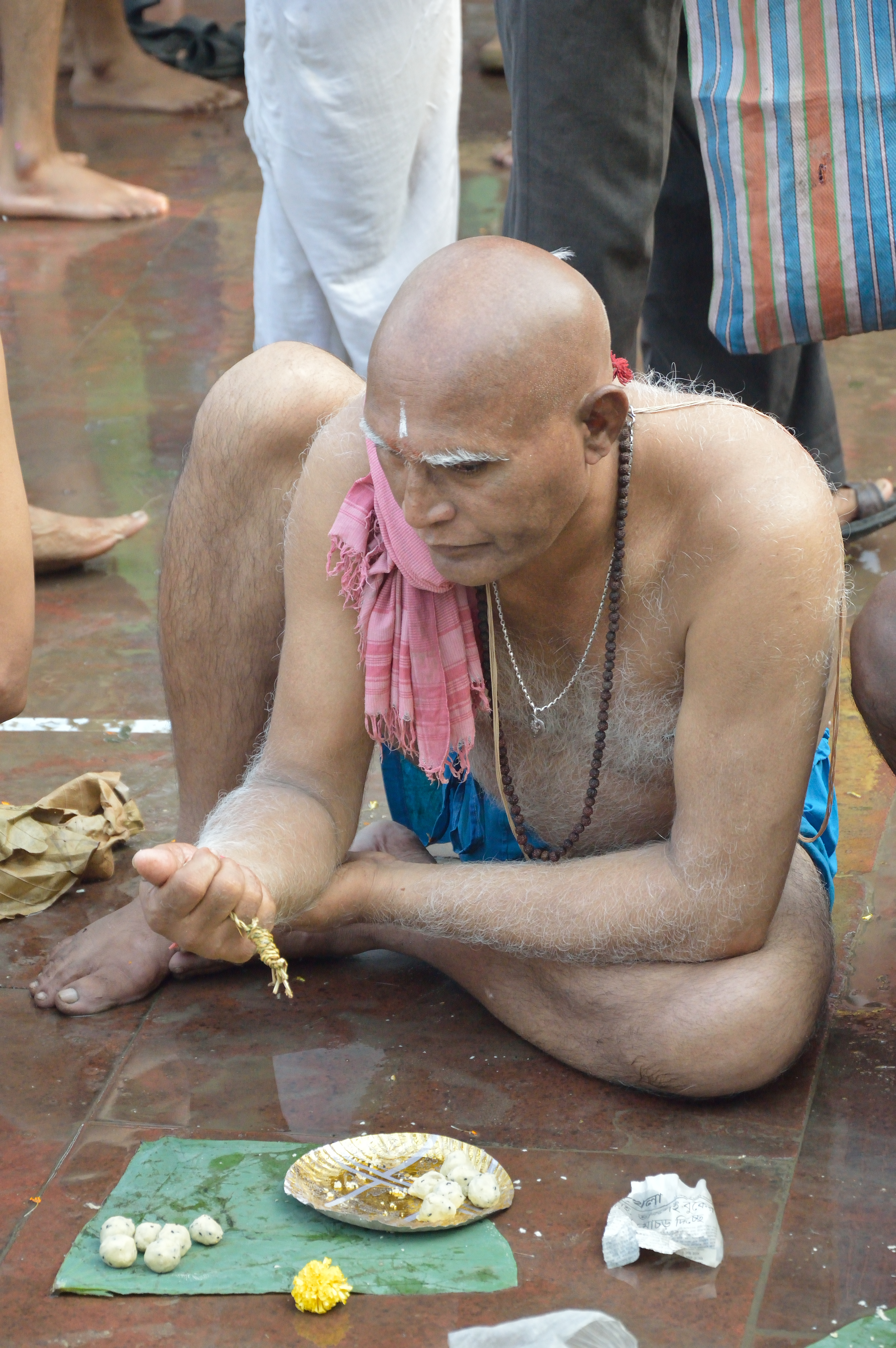
Śrāddha taking place at the Jagannath Ghat in Calcutta, at the end of Pitri Paksha

Ancestors are widely revered, honoured, and venerated in India. The spirit of a dead person is called a Pitri, which is venerated. When a person dies, the family observes a thirteen-day mourning period, generally called śrāddha. A year thence, they observe the ritual of tarpana, in which the family makes offerings to the deceased. During these rituals, the family prepares the food items that the deceased liked and offers food to the deceased. They offer this food to crows as well on certain days as it is believed that the soul comes in the form of a bird to taste it. They are also obliged to offer śrāddha, a small feast of specific preparations, to eligible Brahmins. Only after these rituals are the family members allowed to eat. It is believed that this reminds the ancestors's spirits that they are not forgotten and are loved, so it brings them peace. On śrāddha days, people pray that the souls of ancestors be appeased, forget any animosity and find peace. Each year, on the particular date (as per the Hindu calendar) when the person had died, the family members repeat this ritual. This period falls just before the Navaratri or Durga Puja falling in the month of Ashvin. Mahalaya marks the end of the fortnight-long tarpana to the ancestors.

Indian and Chinese practices of ancestor-worship are prevalent throughout Asia as a result of the large Indian and Chinese populations in countries such as Singapore, Malaysia, Indonesia, and elsewhere across the continent. Furthermore, the large Indian population in places such as Fiji and Guyana has resulted in these practices spreading beyond their Asian homeland.

==== Assam ====
The Ahom religion is based on ancestor-worship. The Ahoms believe that a person after his death remains as ‘Dam’ (ancestor) only for a few days and soon he becomes ‘Phi’ (God). They also believe that the soul of a person which is immortal unites with the supreme soul, possesses the qualities of a spiritual being and always blesses the family. So every Ahom family in order to worship the dead establish a pillar on the opposite side of the kitchen (Barghar) which is called ‘Damkhuta’ where they worship the dead with various offerings like homemade wine, mah-prasad, rice with various items of meat and fish. Me-Dam-Me-Phi, a ritual centred on commemorating the dead, is celebrated by the Ahom people on 31 January every year in memory of the departed. It is the manifestation of the concept of ancestor worship that the Ahoms share with other peoples originating from the Tai-Shan stock. It is a festival to show respect to the departed ancestors and remember their contribution to society. On the day of Me-Dam Me Phi worship is offered only to Chaufi and Dam Chaufi because they are regarded as gods of heaven.

==== Indus Valley civilization ====
At Rakhigarhi, an Indus Valley civilization (IVC) site in Haryana, skeletons of a man between 35-40 years of age and a woman in her early 20s were found, speculated to have been married and buried together. Their grave contained pots, which likely carried food and water as offerings to the dead.

==== Paliya in Gujarat ====
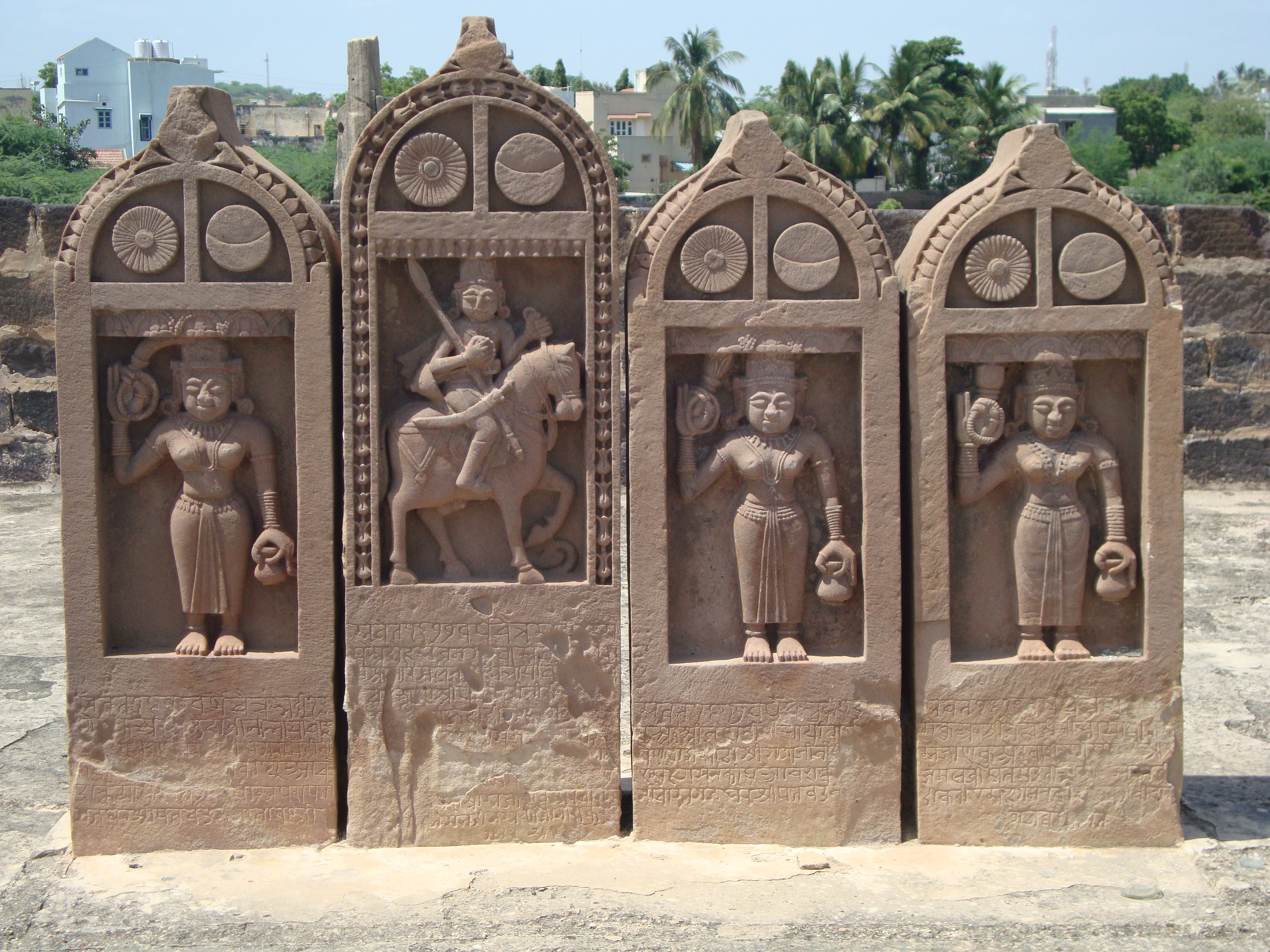
Four Paliyas, one dedicated to man and three to women at Chhatardi, Bhuj, Kutch, Gujarat, India

The Paliya memorial stones are associated with ancestral worship in western India. These memorials are worshipped by people of associated community or descendants of a person on special days such as death day of person, event anniversaries, festivals, auspicious days in Kartika, Shravana or Bhadrapada months of Hindu calendar. These memorials are washed with milk and water on these days. They are smeared with sindoor or kumkuma and flowers are scattered over it. The earthen lamp is lighted near it with sesame oil. Sometimes a flag is erected over it.

==== Tuluva culture in Tulu Nadu ====
Tuluvas practice a form of ancestor worship called kule aradhane.

=== Indonesia ===
In Indonesia, ancestor worship has been a tradition of some of the indigenous people. Podom of the Toba Batak, Waruga of the Minahasans and the coffins of the Karo people (Indonesia) are a few examples of the forms the veneration takes.

=== Japan ===
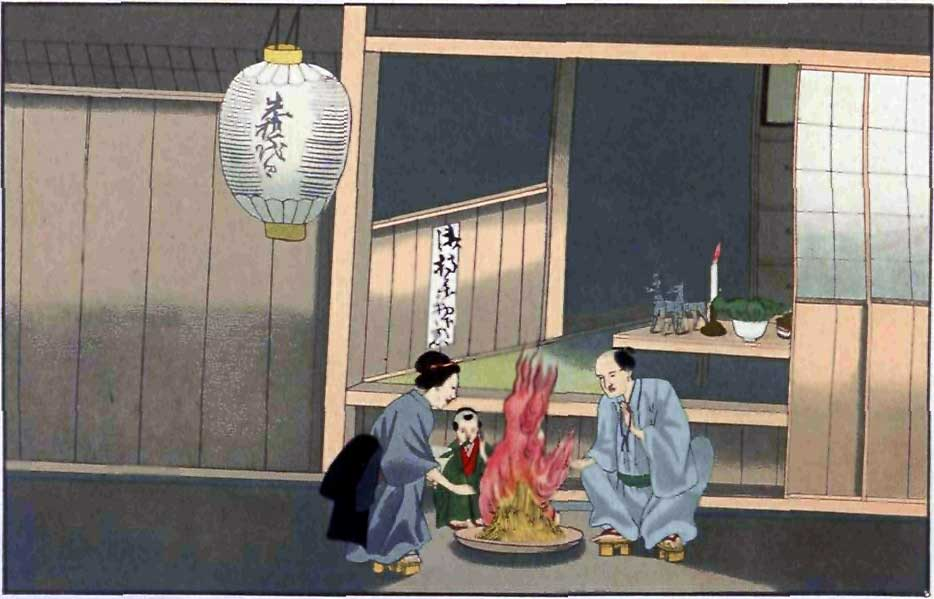
An Edo Period depiction of Obon

Before the introduction of Buddhism to Japan, ancestor worship and funerary rites were not common, especially for non-elites. In the Heian Period, abandonment was a common method of disposing of the dead. Following the advent of Buddhism, rituals began to be performed at the gravesite after burial or cremation, due to Confucian influence, and remain common to the current day.

Memorial services for the deceased by occur on the 7th and 49th days after death, the time it is said to take for the deceased to be reborn, as well as periodically afterwards, such as on the first and third anniversaries of the death. After the funeral, the family of the deceased receives an ihai (位牌) memorial tablet containing a posthumous name, which is then brought to the home butsudan so the deceased can be venerated. Based on the Buddhist sect of the family, ancestral veneration serves different functions, such as praying for the deceased to enter Amida's Pure Land or be guided by the Thirteen Buddhas through the deceased's journey through the afterlife.

The sole Japanese Buddhist sect that rejects prayer for the deceased is Jōdo Shinshū, which views petitionary memorial services as unnecessary, seeing memorial services as a time for the living to reflect on their lives rather than pray for the deceased. Several Japanese Buddhist festivals include strong elements of ancestral veneration, such as Obon (お盆) and Higan (彼岸). During these festivals, people return to their hometowns to honor their ancestors in accordance with Buddhist tradition.

=== Korea ===
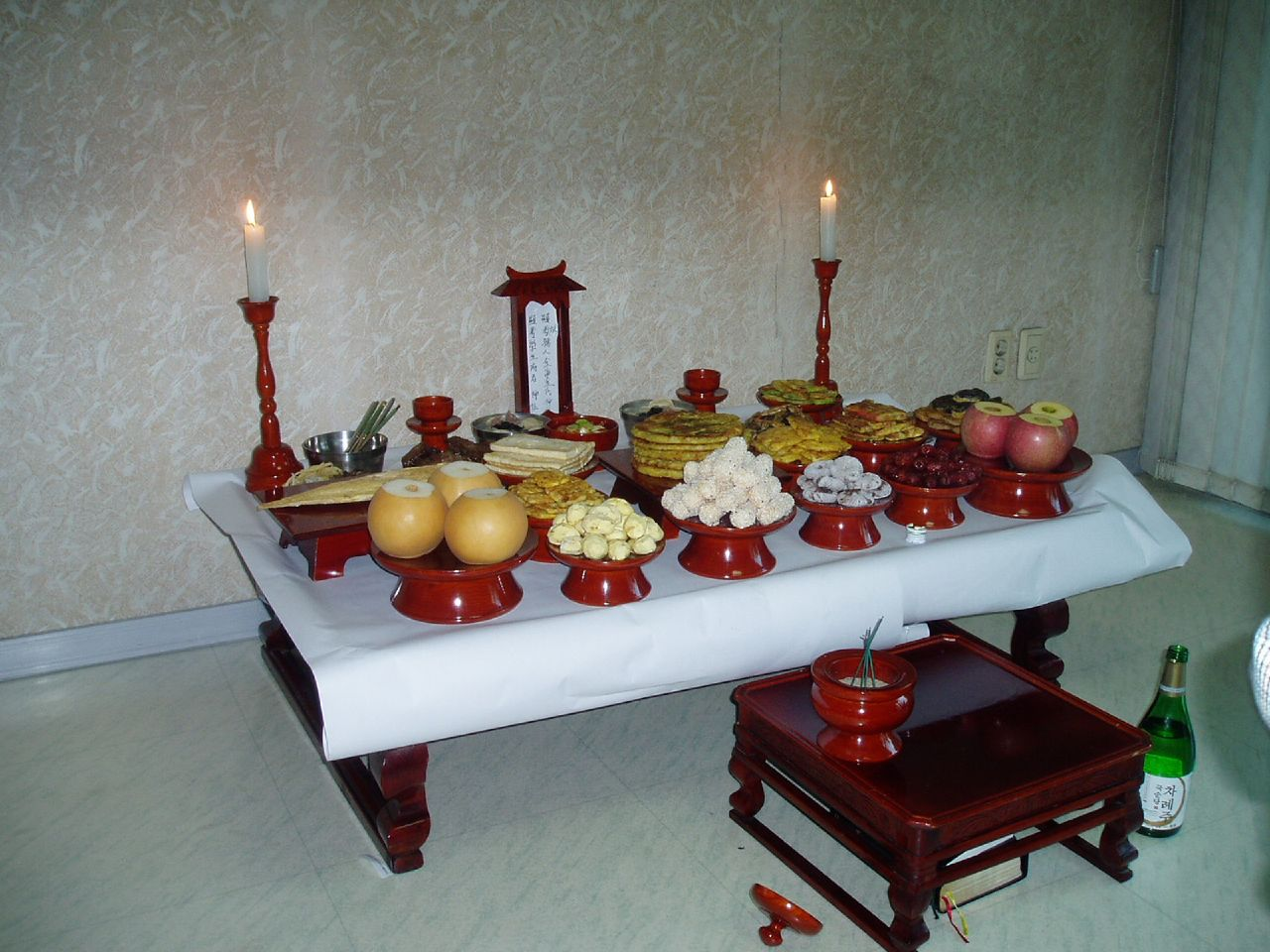
A Korean jesa altar for ancestors

In Korea, ancestor veneration is referred to by the generic term jerye (Korean: 제례; Hanja: 祭禮) or jesa (제사; 祭祀). Notable examples of jerye include Munmyo jerye and Jongmyo jerye, which are performed periodically each year for venerated Neo-Confucian scholars and kings of ancient times, respectively. The ceremony held on the anniversary of a family member's death is called charye (차례). It is still practised today.

The majority of Catholics, Buddhists and nonbelievers practise ancestral rites, although Protestants do not. The Catholic ban on ancestral rituals was lifted in 1939, when the Catholic Church formally recognised ancestral rites as a civil practice. Ancestral rites are typically divided into three categories:

1. Charye (차례, 茶禮) – tea rites held four times a year on major holidays (Korean New Year, Chuseok)
2. Kije (기제, 忌祭) – household rites held the night before an ancestor's death anniversary (기일, 忌日)
3. Sije (시제, 時祭; also called 사시제 or 四時祭) – seasonal rites held for ancestors who are five or more generations removed (typically performed annually on the tenth lunar month)

=== Myanmar ===
Ancestor worship in modern-day Myanmar is largely confined to some ethnic minority communities, but mainstream remnants of it still exist, such as worship of Bo Bo Gyi (literally "great grandfather"), as well as of other guardian spirits such as nats, all of which may be vestiges of historic ancestor worship. Ancestor worship was present in the royal court in pre-colonial Burma. During the Konbaung dynasty, solid gold images of deceased kings and their consorts were worshipped three times a year by the royal family, during the Burmese New Year (Thingyan), at the beginning and at the end of Vassa. The images were stored in the treasury and worshiped at the Zetawunzaung (ဇေတဝန်ဆောင်, "Hall of Ancestors"), along with a book of odes. Some scholars attribute the disappearance of ancestor worship to the influence of Buddhist doctrines of anicca and anatta, impermanence and rejection of a 'self'.

=== Philippines ===
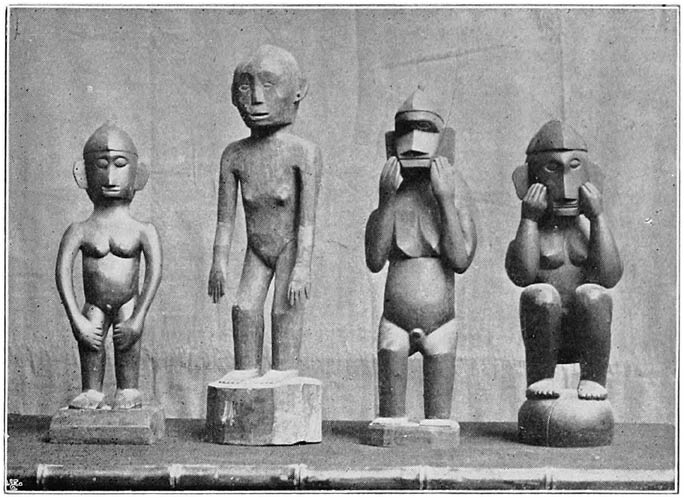
Various Igorot bulul depicting anito or ancestor spirits (c. 1900)

In these animistic indigenous religions of the precolonial Philippines, ancestor spirits were one of the two major types of spirits (anito) with whom shamans communicate. Ancestor spirits were known as umalagad (lit. 'guardian' or 'caretaker'). They can be the spirits of actual ancestors or generalized guardian spirits of a family. Ancient Filipinos believed that upon death, the soul of a person travels (usually by boat) to a spirit world. There can be multiple locations in the spirit world, varying in different ethnic groups. Which place souls end up in depends on how they died, the age at death, or conduct of the person when they were alive. Souls reunite with deceased relatives in the underworld and lead normal lives in the underworld as they did in the material world. In some cases, the souls of evil people undergo penance and cleansing before they are granted entrance into a particular spirit realm. Souls would eventually reincarnate after a period of time in the spirit world.

Souls in the spirit world still retain a degree of influence in the material world, and vice versa. Paganito rituals may be used to invoke good ancestor spirits for protection, intercession, or advice. Vengeful spirits of the dead can manifest as apparitions or ghosts (mantiw) and cause harm to living people. Paganito can be used to appease or banish them. Ancestor spirits also figured prominently during illness or death, as they were believed to be the ones who call the soul to the underworld, guide the soul (a psychopomp), or meet the soul upon arrival. Ancestor spirits are also known as kalading among the Cordillerans; tonong among the Maguindanao and Maranao; umboh among the Sama-Bajau; ninunò among Tagalogs; and nono among Bicolanos. Ancestor spirits are usually represented by carved figures called taotao. These were carved by the community upon a person's death. Every household had a taotao stored in a shelf in the corner of the house.

The predominantly Roman Catholic Filipino people still hold ancestors in particular esteem—though without the formality common to their neighbours—despite having been Christianised since coming into contact with Spanish missionaries in 1521. In the present day, ancestor veneration is expressed in having photographs of the dead by the home altar, a common fixture in many Filipino Christian homes. Candles are often kept burning before the photographs, which are sometimes decorated with garlands of fresh sampaguita, the national flower. Ancestors, particularly dead parents, are still regarded as psychopomps, as a dying person is said to be brought to the afterlife (Tagalog: sundô, "fetch") by the spirits of dead relatives. It is said that when the dying call out the names of deceased loved ones, they can see the spirits of those particular people waiting at the foot of the deathbed.

Filipino Catholic and Aglipayan veneration of the dead finds its greatest expression in the Philippines is the Hallowmas season between 31 October and 2 November, variously called Undás (based on the word for "[the] first", the Spanish andas or possibly honra), Todos los Santos (literally "All Saints"), and sometimes Áraw ng mga Patáy (lit. 'Day of the Dead'), which refers to the following solemnity of All Souls' Day. Filipinos traditionally observe this day by visiting the family dead, cleaning and repairing their tombs. Common offerings are prayers, flowers, candles, and even food, while many also spend the remainder of the day and ensuing night holding reunions at the graveyard, playing games and music or singing. Meanwhile, Chinese Filipinos have the most apparent and distinct customs related to ancestor veneration, carried over from traditional Chinese religion and most often melded with their current Catholic faith. Many still burn incense and kim at family tombs and before photos at home, while they incorporate Chinese practises into Masses held during the All Souls' Day period.

=== Sri Lanka ===
In Sri Lanka, making offerings to one's ancestors is conducted on the sixth day after death as a part of traditional Sri Lankan funeral rites.

=== Thailand ===
In rural northern Thailand, a religious ceremony honoring ancestral spirits known as Faun Phii (Thai: ฟ้อนผี, lit. "spirit dance" or "ghost dance") takes place. It includes offerings for ancestors with spirit mediums sword fighting, spirit-possessed dancing, and spirit mediums cock fighting in a spiritual cockfight.

=== Vietnam ===
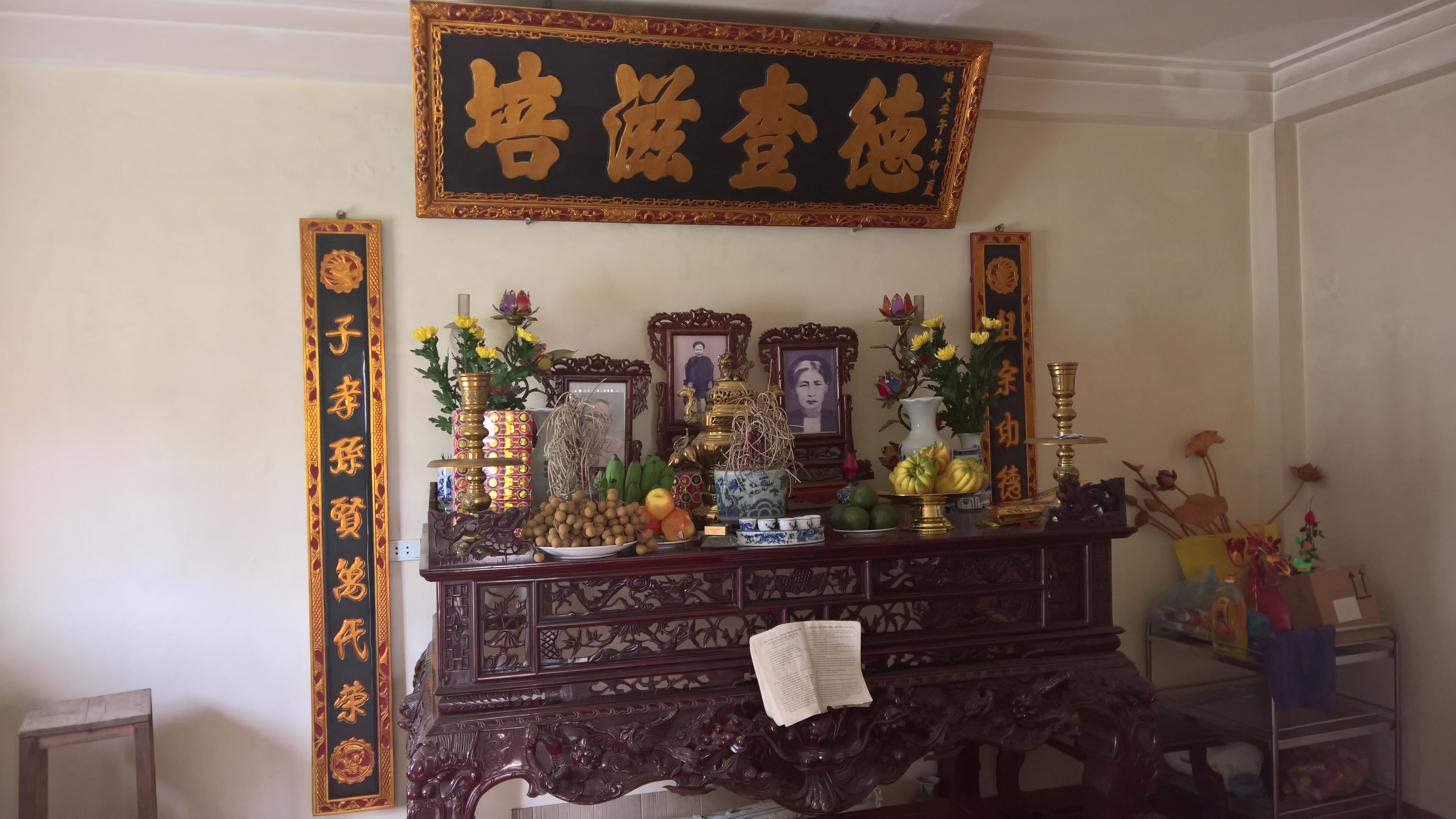
A Vietnamese altar for ancestors

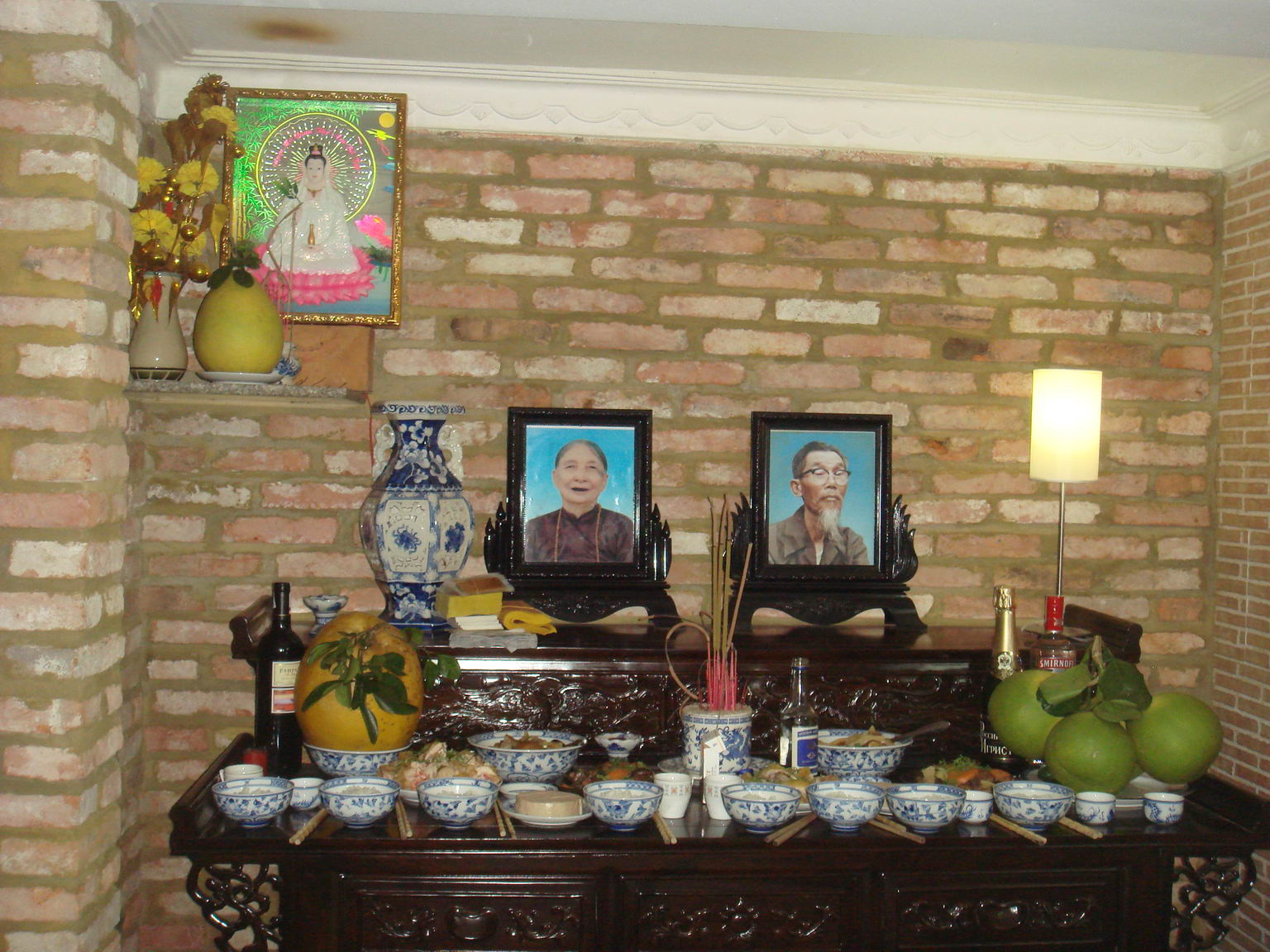
Ancestors altar of a Vietnamese Buddhist family

Ancestor veneration is one of the most unifying aspects of Vietnamese culture, as practically all Vietnamese have an ancestor altar in their home or business. In Vietnam, traditionally people did not celebrate birthdays (before Western influence), but the death anniversary of one's loved one was always an important occasion. Besides an essential gathering of family members for a banquet in memory of the deceased, incense sticks are burned along with hell notes, and great platters of food are made as offerings on the ancestor altar, which usually has pictures or plaques with the names of the deceased. In the case of missing persons, believed to be dead by their family, a Wind tomb is made. These offerings and practices are done frequently during important traditional or religious celebrations, the starting of a new business, or even when a family member needs guidance or counsel and is a hallmark of the emphasis Vietnamese culture places on filial duty. A significant distinguishing feature of Vietnamese ancestor veneration is that women have traditionally been allowed to participate and co-officiate ancestral rites, unlike in Chinese Confucian doctrine, which allows only male descendants to perform such rites.

== European cultures ==
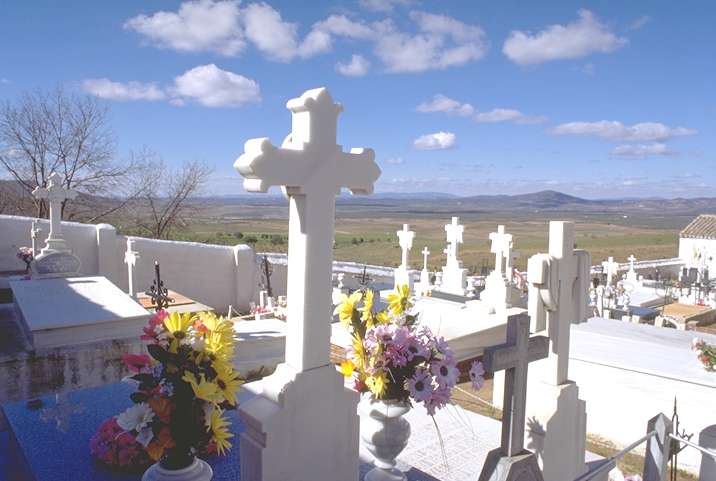
A scenic cemetery in rural Spain

Care of the dead and the loving duty toward one's ancestors (pietas) were fundamental aspects of ancient Roman culture. A clear manifestation of this is Roman Republican era portrait busts which may have originated in the practice of making death masks of ancestors which were displayed in the home and during funerary rites and on the anniversary of the ancestor's death.

In Catholic countries in Europe (continued later with the Anglican Church in England), November 1 (All Saints' Day) became known and is still known as the day to specifically venerate those who have died, and who have been deemed official saints by the Church. November 2 (All Souls Day), or "The Day of the Dead", is the day when all of the faithful dead are remembered. On that day, families go to cemeteries to light candles for their dead relatives, leave them flowers, and often to picnic. They also celebrate Suffrage Masses to shorten the time that souls need to leave Purgatory and the enter in Paradise.

The evening before All Saints'—"All Hallows Eve" or "Hallowe'en"—is unofficially the Catholic day to remember the realities of Hell, to mourn the souls lost to evil, and to remember ways to avoid Hell. It is commonly celebrated in the United States and parts of the United Kingdom in a spirit of light-hearted horror and fear, which is marked by the recounting of ghost stories, bonfires, wearing costumes, carving jack-o'-lanterns, and "trick-or-treating" (going door to door seeking candy).

=== Brythonic Celtic cultures ===
In Cornwall and Wales, the autumn ancestor festivals occur around November 1. In Cornwall the festival is known as Kalan Gwav, and in Wales as Calan Gaeaf. Modern-day Halloween is derived from these festivals.

=== Gaelic Celtic cultures ===
During Samhain, November 1 in Ireland and Scotland, the dead are thought to return to the world of the living, and offerings of food and light are left for them. On the festival day, ancient people would extinguish the hearth fires in their homes, participate in a community bonfire festival, and then carry a flame home from the communal fire and use it to light their home fires anew. This custom has continued to some extent into modern times, in both the Celtic nations and the diaspora. Lights in the window to guide the dead home are left burning all night. On the Isle of Man the festival is known as "old Sauin" or Hop-tu-Naa.

== North America ==
In the United States and Canada, flowers, wreaths, grave decorations and sometimes candles, food, small pebbles, or items the dead valued in life are put on graves year-round as a way to honor the dead. These traditions originate in the diverse cultural backgrounds of the current populations of both countries. In the United States, many people honor deceased loved ones who were in the military on Memorial Day. Days with religious and spiritual significance like Easter, Christmas, Candlemas, and All Souls' Day, Day of the Dead, or Samhain are also times when relatives and friends of the deceased may gather at the graves of their loved ones. In the Catholic Church, one's local parish church often offers prayers for the dead on their death anniversary or All Souls' Day.

In the United States, Memorial Day is a Federal holiday for remembering the deceased men and women who served in the nation's military, particularly those who died in war or during active service. In the 147 National Cemeteries, like Arlington and Gettysburg, it is common for volunteers to place small American flags at each grave. Memorial Day is traditionally observed on the last Monday in May, allotting for a 3-day weekend in which many memorial services and parades take place not only across the country, but in 26 American cemeteries on foreign soil (in France, Belgium, the United Kingdom, the Philippines, Panama, Italy, Luxembourg, Mexico, Netherlands, and Tunisia). It is also common practice among veterans to memorialize fallen service members on the dates of their death. This practice is also common in other countries when remembering Americans who died in battles to liberate their towns in the World Wars. One example of this is on 16 August (1944) Colonel Griffith, died of wounds from enemy action sustained in Lèves, the same day he is credited with saving Chartres Cathedral from destruction.

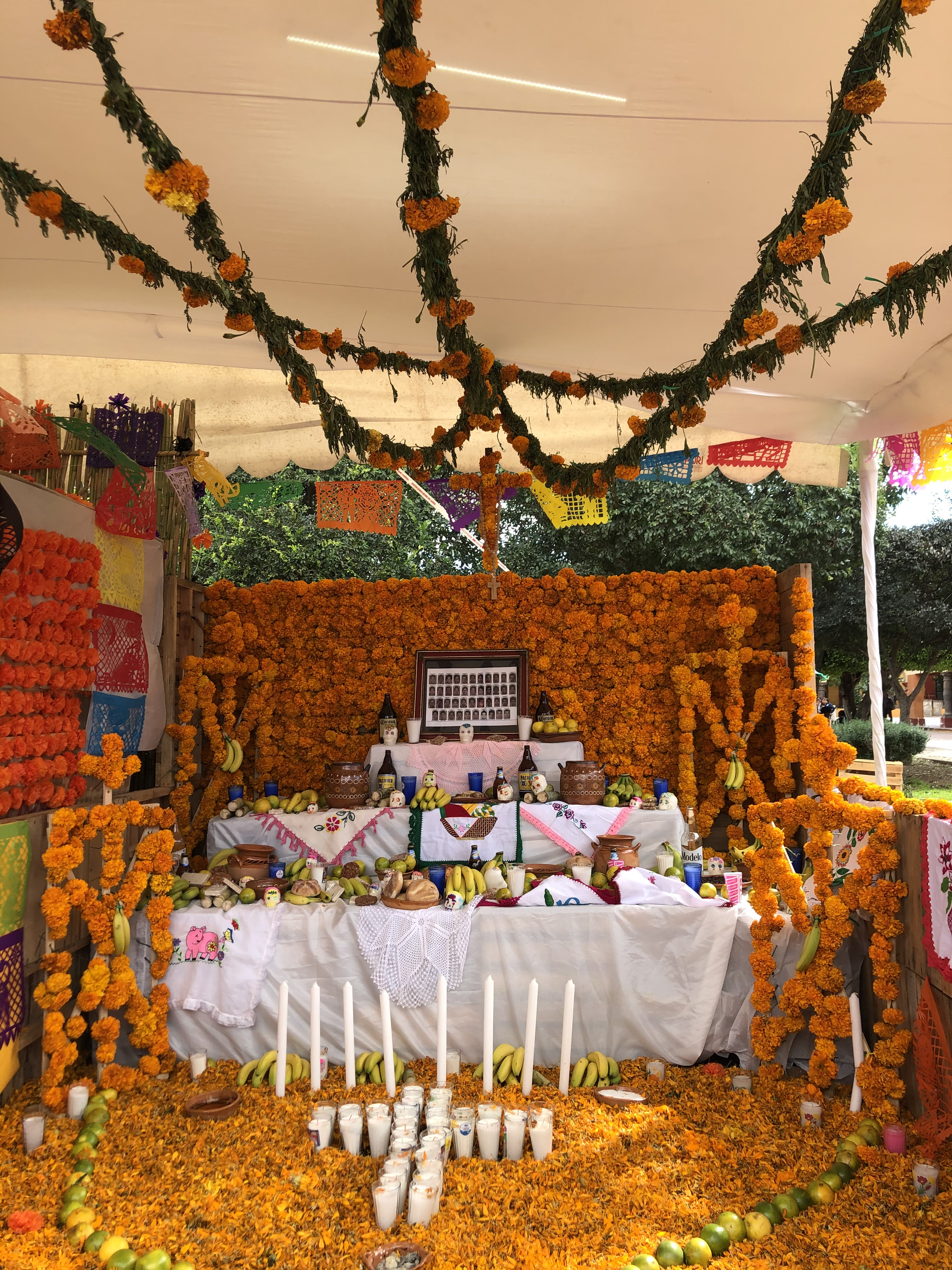
Ofrenda in Tequisquiapan, Mexico

In Judaism, when a grave site is visited, a small pebble is placed on the headstone. While there is no clear answer as to why, this custom of leaving pebbles may date back to biblical days when individuals were buried under piles of stones. Today, they are left as tokens that people have been there to visit and to remember. Americans of various religions and cultures may build a shrine in their home dedicated to loved ones who have died, with pictures of their ancestors, flowers and mementos. Increasingly, many roadside shrines may be seen for deceased relatives who died in car accidents or were killed on that spot, sometimes financed by the state or province as these markers serve as potent reminders to drive cautiously in hazardous areas. The Vietnam Veterans Memorial in Washington, D.C., is particularly known for the leaving of offerings to the deceased; items left are collected by the National Park Service and archived.

Members of the Church of Jesus Christ of Latter-day Saints perform posthumous baptisms and other rituals for their dead ancestors, along with those of other families. Native Americans were not heavily concerned with the veneration of the dead, though they were known to bury the dead with clothes and tools as well as occasionally leave food and drink at the gravesite; Pueblo Indians supported a cult of the dead which worshipped or petitioned the dead through ritualistic dances.

== Islam ==
Islam has a complex and mixed view on the idea of grave shrines and ancestor worship. The graves of many early Islamic figures are holy sites for Muslims, including Ali, and a cemetery with many companions and early caliphs. Many other mausoleums are major architectural, political, and cultural sites, including the National Mausoleum in Pakistan and the Taj Mahal in India. However, the religious movement of Wahhabism disputes the concept of saint veneration. Followers of this movement have destroyed many gravesite shrines, including in Saudi Arabia and in territory controlled by the Islamic State. The Salafis sometimes refer to Sufis as grave worshippers. It is often interchanged with an "innovator" or a practitioner of bidʻa.

Imam Ahmad, Al-Hakim, and others narrated about Marwan Ibn al-Hakam–Umayyad governor of Medina–that he once passed by the grave of the Islamic prophet Muhammad and saw a man with his cheek on the grave. Marwan Ibn al-Hakam asked: "Do you know what you are doing?" Nearing the grave, Marwan Ibn al-Hakam realized it was Abu Ayyub al-Ansariyy, one of the greatest companions of Muhammad. Abu Ayyub al-Ansariyy replied, "Yes, I know what I am doing. I came here for the Messenger of Allah—not for the stone." By this he meant he was seeking the blessings from the presence of Muhammad, not for the stone covering his grave. Abu Ayyub al-Ansariyy continued his response with what he heard Muhammad say: "Do not cry over the Religion of Islam if the rulers are ruling correctly. Rather, cry over this Religion if the rulers are ruling incorrectly." By his response, Abu Ayyub was telling Marwan Ibn al-Hakam: "You are not one of those rulers who are correctly ruling by the rules of Islam." Some followers of Islam are at odds with the concept of saint veneration, but this practice is retained in Turkey, particularly through Alevi Muslims.

== Judaism ==
Judaism, like Islam, has a complicated relationship to ancestor veneration/worship, grave shrines, and other related concepts, due to their modern perception as potential idolatrous or polytheistic. However, given the familial/tribal orientation of Judaism as a religion, it is worth noting that the first blessing of the Amidah (the prayer said 3 times a day by Rabbinic Jews) is dedicated to the God of Abraham, Isaac, and Jacob, the Patriarchs, and these days often including a list of matriarchs. A level of respect towards ancestors is central in Judaism.

It is thought ancient Israelite religion and Pre-Israelite Cannanites practiced a form of ancestor worship in which ancestors were raised to the status of gods, and some form of similar practice was likely seen as acceptable in Israelite religion until King Josiah's reign, and possibly even continuing afterwards. It is possible that ancestors were particularly venerated during the New Moon feasting of ancient times. In Biblical literature, and in contemporary prayer, the ancestors, particularly Abraham, Moses, Aaron, Jacob/Israel, or "the Patriarchs" and "the Matriarchs", are often referred to. Stress is placed on the identity of the Jewish people as being the "seed", "house", or "children" of these figures.

Two prayers—Kaddish and Yizkor—are recited on behalf of the dead by Rabbinic Jews, including on anniversaries of a death. For some, the performance of prayers, especially prayers in their first year after death from their children, are thought to positively impact God's judgement of them, as well as donations and other good works done in their name. This is similar to Japanese practices and other ancestral veneration practices overall. These good deeds done in the name of the dead are reciprocated by the dead's prayers to God for the living. There are taboos and injunctions the living must follow, particularly in regard to their direct ancestors: not to use the remains of coffin wood for other purposes, to bury the dead in a proper shroud, and not to eat or drink at the beginning and/or close of Shabbat, as that is when spirits of the dead are believed to eat, drink, and bathe. One who eats during this time has stolen from the spirits, and one who drinks at the beginning of Shabbat risks ingesting contaminated bathing water.

Ashkenazi Jews commonly name children after dead relatives, and are hoped to embody those dead's positive traits. Eastern European Jews specifically transform the concept of zechut avot—the merit of one's ancestors, used to explain both a belief that the dead pray on behalf of the deceased, and a prayer to God to remember the good deeds of one's ancestors and be merciful in judgement—into the related idea of yichus ovus, inherited ancestral status.

In contemporary Rabbinic Judaism, visiting the graves of tzaddikim (righteous figures akin to saints) has long remained popular, including the graves of ancestral figures like Abraham and Esther. These visits may also be accompanied by petitions of the dead, as their elevated status is thought to give them more direct access to God. Rabbinic Jews stress that they do not worship the dead, and only respect and honor them—a distinction made by other cultures, including Japanese and African cultures.

== See also ==
- Ancestral hall – Temples dedicated to deified ancestors in Chinese culture
- Ásatrú – Modern pagan religion
- Bon Festival – Japanese Buddhist custom
- Chinese ancestral worship – Traditional veneration of ancestors in Chinese culture
- Chinese folk religion
- Chinese Rites controversy – High Qing-era dispute among Catholic missionaries
- Death anniversary – Anniversary celebrated on the day on which an individual died
- Haus Tambaran
- Ifá – Yoruba divination practice
- Joss paper – Sheets of paper made into burnt offerings in Chinese culture
- Moleben – Religious service
- Qingming Festival – Chinese festival honouring ancestors
- Shamanism – Religious practice
- Spirit tablet – Ritual object in East Asian ancestor veneration
- Votive offering – Object placed or left somewhere for religious purposes
- Transfer of merit – Buddhist devotional practice
- Ullambana – Sutra in Mahāyāna Buddhism
- Votive Mass#Suffrage Mass – Mass offered for a special intention
- Zhong Yuan Festival – Traditional Buddhist and Taoist festival
