= Sawangan, Sulawesi =

Sawangan
- Village
- Location in Sulawesi and Indonesia Sawangan (Indonesia)
- Coordinates: 1°23′33″N 124°57′46″E
- Country: Indonesia
- Region: Sulawesi
- Province: North Sulawesi
- Regency: North Minahasa Regency
- District: Airmadidi
- Time zone: UTC+8 (ICST)
- Area code: (+62) 431

Sawangan in a village in North Minahasa Regency, North Sulawesi, Indonesia. It is known for the waruga archaeological park sarcophagi found in the area. Sawangan is located in Airmadidi, North Minahasa Regency province of North Sulawesi. There are also plantations and rice fields. It borders the villages of Airmadidi Down and Rap-Rap.
