= Wind tomb =

Tomb commemorating persons with missing bodies

A wind tomb (Hán-Nôm: 墓逾; or seance grave, wind grave; Vietnamese "Mộ gió") is an empty tomb that does not contain a person's corpse. As with wind graves, which are "tumuli" or rounded mounds of earth, wind tombs are typically made by families or loved ones to commemorate a person whose body cannot be found, such as those lost at sea or who have died in combat.

== See also ==
- Cenotaph
- Veneration of the dead in Vietnam
