= Waruga =

Sarcophagi in Indonesia

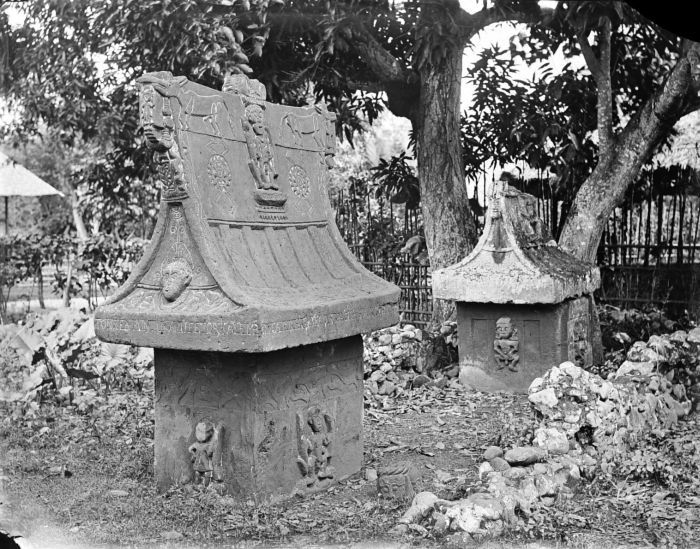
Waruga with carvings

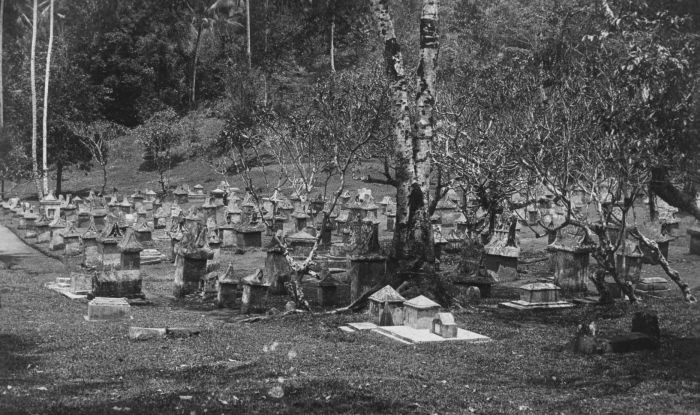
Sawangan waruga

Waruga (Tontemboan), warugha (Tondano), or baruga (Tonsea and Tombulu) are a type of sarcophagus or above ground tomb traditionally used by the Minahasans of North Sulawesi, Indonesia. They are made of stone and consist of a ridged upper part and a box-shaped lower section.

Dead Minahasans were originally wrapped in woka, a type of leaf. Woka is the leaf of the fan palm, Livistona. Then they were put in wooden coffins. In the 9th century the Minahasa started using waruga.

Bodies are put in a position facing north. They are seated with the heel and toe attached to the buttocks, and the head "kissing" the knees. The Minhasa believe their ancestors came from the north.

In 1828 the Dutch banned the use of waruga and the Minahasa started making coffins. Disease outbreak, including typhoid and cholera, was feared. This was also due to Christian practice being to bury the dead.

Waruga in Tonsea have carvings and reliefs showing how the bodies are stored in their respective waruga and illustrating livelihoods.

There are about 370 Warugas (waruga-waruga) in Rap-Rap (15), Airmadidi Bawah (211), and Sawangan (144). They are a tourist attraction and were listed in the UNESCO World Heritage Site Tentative List since 1995. However, it was pulled out from the list on 2015. At Taman Purbakala Waruga-Waruga, the sarcophagi have been collected from surrounding areas and at a nearby museum porcelain, armbands, axes and bone fragments are exhibited. Most of the waruga have been looted for valuable contents.

== See also ==
- Podom
- Veneration of the dead (ancestor worship)
