= Podom =

Sarcophagi in Sumatra

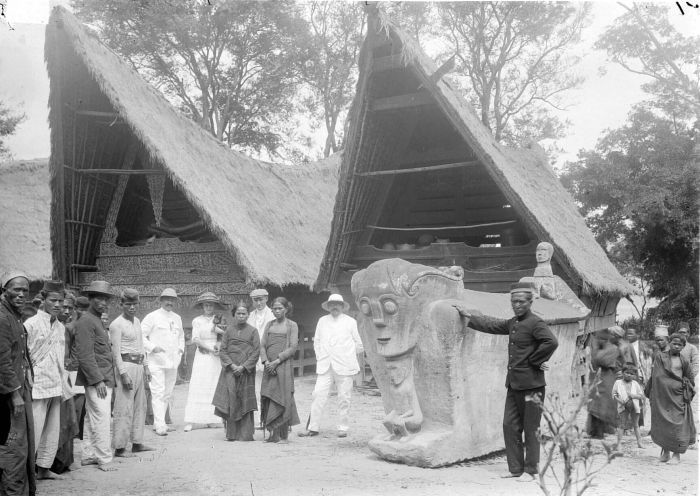
A podom in Lumban Suhi Suhi on Samosir (photo by Tassilo Adam, c. 1918)

Podom are sculpted sarcophagi traditional to the Toba Batak of Sumatra. They have the forms of longhouse roofs or boats. They are made of stone.

== See also ==
- Waruga, sarcophagi in northern Sumatra
