= Famadihana =

Funerary tradition of the Malagasy people in Madagascar

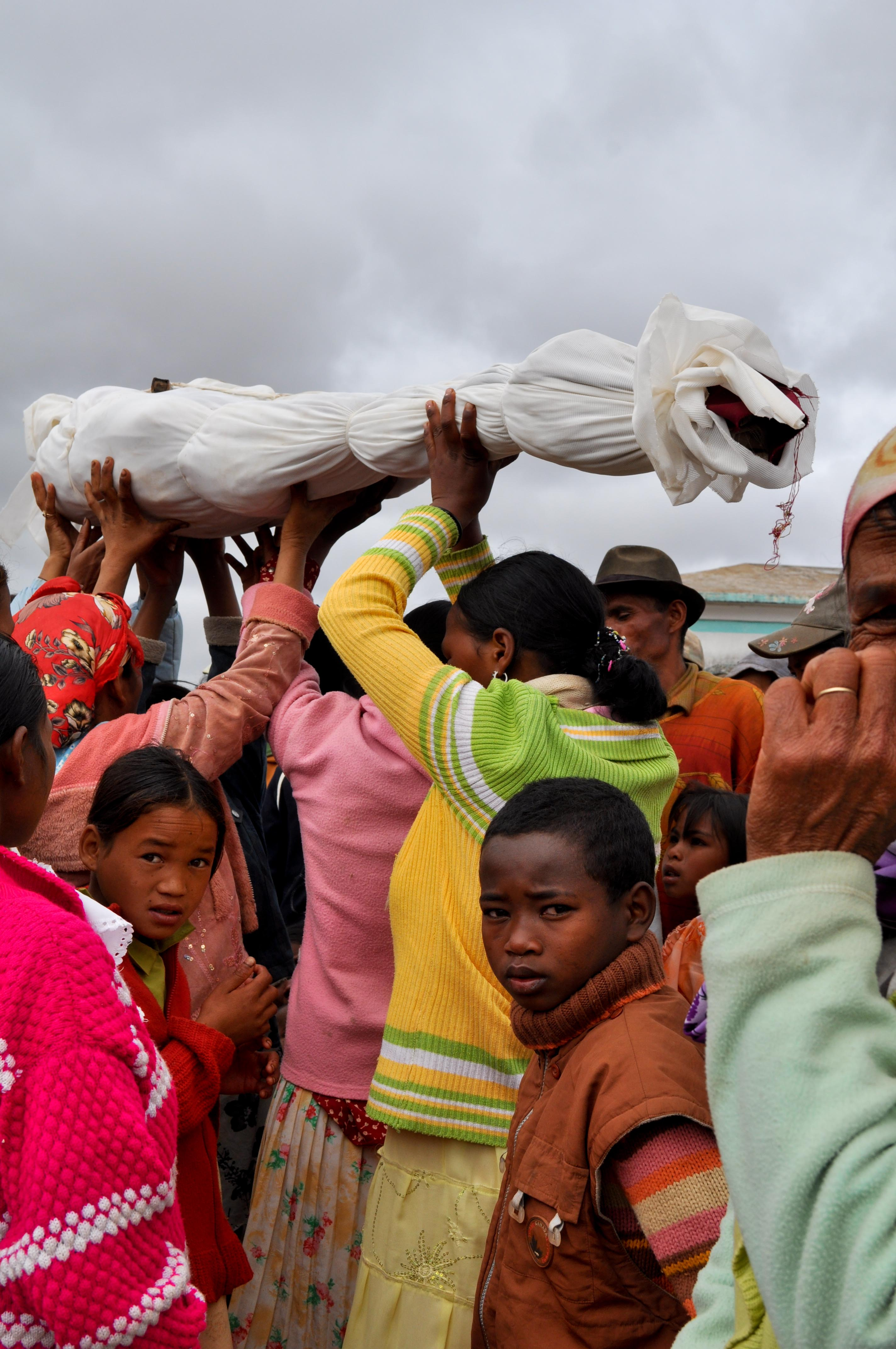
Famadihana in Madagascar

Famadihana is a funerary tradition of the Malagasy peoples of Madagascar. During this ceremony, known as the turning of the bones, people bring forth the bodies of their ancestors from the family crypts, rewrap the corpses in fresh cloth, and rewrite their names on the cloth so they will always be remembered. Then they dance to live music while carrying the corpses over their heads and go around the tomb before returning the corpses to the family tomb. They believe in celebrating the life lived by the dead person.

Famadihana appears to be a custom of somewhat recent origin, perhaps only since the 17th century in its present form, although it may be an adaptation of premodern double funeral customs from Southeast Asia and Oceania. The custom is based upon a belief that the spirits of the dead finally join the world of the ancestors after the body's complete decomposition and appropriate ceremonies, which may take many years. In Madagascar, this became a regular ritual usually once every five to seven years, and the custom brings together extended families in celebrations of kinship, sometimes even those with troubled relations.

The practice of Famadihana is on the decline due to the expense of silk shrouds and belief by some Malagasy that the practice is outdated. Early missionaries discouraged the practice, and Evangelical Christian Malagasy have abandoned the practice in increasing numbers. The Catholic Church, however, no longer objects to the practice, because it regards Famadihana as purely cultural rather than religious. As one Malagasy man explained to the BBC, "It's important because it's our way of respecting the dead. It is also a chance for the whole family, from across the country, to come together."

Additionally, the practice of Famadihana is thought to be connected to pneumonic plague transmission in the region. The Malagasy government has issued rulings forbidding the practice for individuals who died of plague, but there have been reports of people ignoring this decree.
