= 2025–26 Liga 4 North Sulawesi =

Liga 4 North Sulawesi
- Season: 2025–26
- Dates: 28 March – 19 April 2026
- Champions: Persma 1960
- Runner up: Bolsel
- National phase: Persma 1960; Bolsel
- Matches: 28
- Goals: 103 (3.68 per match)

The 2025–26 Liga 4 North Sulawesi will be the second season of Liga 4 North Sulawesi after the change in the structure of Indonesian football competition and serves as a qualifying round for the national phase of the 2025–26 Liga 4.

The competition is organised by the North Sulawesi Provincial PSSI Association.

== Teams ==
=== Teams changes ===
The following teams changed division after the 2024–25 season.

▼ Relegated from Liga Nusantara
- Sulut United

=== Participating teams ===
A total of 12 teams are competing in this season of the 2025–26 Liga 4 North Sulawesi Governor's Cup. The tournament is scheduled to kick off on 28 March 2026.

No	Team	Location	2024–25 season
1	Persibom	Bolaang Mongondow Regency	—
2	Bolsel	South Bolaang Mongondow Regency	—
3	Persminsel	South Minahasa Regency	—
4	PS Kuda Laut Belang	Southeast Minahasa Regency	—
5	Persmin	Minahasa Regency	—
6	Bhayangkara Kawanua	Manado City	—
7	Persma 1960	Manado City	—
8	PS Bank Sulut	Manado City	—
9	PS Klabat XIII Jaya Sakti	Manado City	champions
10	Sulut	Manado City	—
11	PSMU North Minahasa	North Minahasa Regency	—
12	Puma	Sangihe Islands Regency	—

== Venues ==
The 2025–26 Liga 4 North Sulawesi matches will be held at Klabat Stadium and Lantamal VIII Kairagi Field in Manado.

== First round ==
=== Group A ===
Pos	Team	Pld	W	D	L	GF	GA	GD	Pts	Qualification	MIN	PUM	BNK	SLT
1	Persmin	3	3	0	0	16	0	+16	9	Qualification to the second round		1–0	—	8–0
2	Puma	3	2	0	1	10	6	+4	6	Qualification to the second round	—		4–2	—
3	PS Bank Sulut	3	1	0	2	4	12	−8	3		0–7	—		—
4	Sulut	3	0	0	3	4	16	−12	0		—	3–6	1–2	

Source: Liga 4 North Sulawesi
Rules for classification: 1) Points; 2) Head-to-head points; 3) Head-to-head goal difference; 4) Head-to-head number of goals; 5) Goal difference; 6) Number of goals; 7) Fair-play points; 8) Draw.

=== Group B ===
Pos	Team	Pld	W	D	L	GF	GA	GD	Pts	Qualification	KLA	MSL	BOM	BHY
1	PS Klabat XIII Jaya Sakti	3	3	0	0	8	1	+7	9	Qualification to the second round		3–0	—	2–0
2	Persminsel	3	2	0	1	7	4	+3	6	Qualification to the second round	—		4–1	3–0
3	Persibom	3	1	0	2	6	10	−4	3		1–3	—		—
4	Bhayangkara Kawanua	3	0	0	3	3	9	−6	0		—	—	3–4	

Source: Liga 4 North Sulawesi
Rules for classification: 1) Points; 2) Head-to-head points; 3) Head-to-head goal difference; 4) Head-to-head number of goals; 5) Goal difference; 6) Number of goals; 7) Fair-play points; 8) Draw.

=== Grup C ===
Pos	Team	Pld	W	D	L	GF	GA	GD	Pts	Qualification	PMA	BSL	MUT	KDL
1	Persma 1960	3	3	0	0	10	0	+10	9	Qualification to the second round		2–0	—	6–0
2	Bolsel	3	1	1	1	6	2	+4	4	Qualification to the second round	—		0–0	—
3	PSMU	3	1	1	1	3	3	0	4		0–2	—		—
4	PS Kuda Laut Belang	3	0	0	3	1	15	−14	0		—	0–6	1–3	

Source: Liga 4 North Sulawesi
Rules for classification: 1) Points; 2) Head-to-head points; 3) Head-to-head goal difference; 4) Head-to-head number of goals; 5) Goal difference; 6) Number of goals; 7) Fair-play points; 8) Draw.

== Second round ==
The second round (round of 6) features the six teams that advanced from the first round. They were drawn into two groups of three teams. The winners and runners-up of each group advance to the semi-finals.

=== Group D ===
Pos	Team	Pld	W	D	L	GF	GA	GD	Pts	Qualification	PMA	MSL	MIN
1	Persma 1960	2	1	1	0	2	1	+1	4	Qualification to the knockout stage		—	1–0
2	Persminsel	2	0	2	0	3	3	0	2	Qualification to the knockout stage	1–1		—
3	Persmin	2	0	1	1	2	3	−1	1		—	2–2	

Source: Liga 4 North Sulawesi
Rules for classification: 1) Points; 2) Head-to-head points; 3) Head-to-head goal difference; 4) Head-to-head number of goals; 5) Goal difference; 6) Number of goals; 7) Fair-play points; 8) Draw.

=== Group E ===
Pos	Team	Pld	W	D	L	GF	GA	GD	Pts	Qualification	BSL	KLA	PUM
1	Bolsel	2	1	1	0	4	1	+3	4	Qualification to the knockout stage		—	3–0
2	PS Klabat XIII Jaya Sakti	2	1	1	0	2	1	+1	4	Qualification to the knockout stage	1–1		—
3	Puma	2	0	0	2	0	4	−4	0		—	0–1	

Source: Liga 4 North Sulawesi
Rules for classification: 1) Points; 2) Head-to-head points; 3) Head-to-head goal difference; 4) Head-to-head number of goals; 5) Goal difference; 6) Number of goals; 7) Fair-play points; 8) Draw.

== Knockout stage ==
The winners and runners-up from Groups D and E in the second round advanced to the knockout stage.

=== Bracket ===
Semi-finals
11 April 2026 – Klabat Stadium, Manado
D1	Bolsel	2
E2	Persminsel	1
12 April 2026 – Klabat Stadium, Manado
E1	Persma 1960	1
D2	PS Klabat XII Jaya Sakti	0

Final
19 April 2026 – Klabat Stadium, Manado
WSF1	Bolsel	0
WSF2	Persma 1960	2
Third-place play-off
18 April 2026 – Klabat Stadium, Manado
LSF1	Persminsel	3 (1)
LSF2	PS Klabat XII Jaya Sakti	3 (4)

=== Semi-finals ===
The semi-finals are scheduled for 11–12 April 2026.

11 April 2026
14:30 WITA

Bolsel	2–1	Persminsel
	Report

Klabat Stadium, Manado
12 April 2026
14:30 WITA

Persma 1960	1–0	PS Klabat XII Jaya Sakti
	Report

Klabat Stadium, Manado

=== Third-place play-off ===
18 April 2026
14:30 WITA

Persminsel	3–3	PS Klabat XII Jaya Sakti
	Report
Penalties
	1–4

Klabat Stadium, Manado

=== Final ===
The final match determines the champion of Liga 4 North Sulawesi and the representative for the national phase.

19 April 2026
14:00 WITA

Bolsel	0–2	Persma 1960
	Report

Klabat Stadium, Manado

== See also ==
- 2025–26 Liga 4
