= 2023–24 Liga 3 North Sulawesi =

Football tournament season in Indonesia

Tournament details
- Country: Indonesia
- Venue: 1
- Dates: 15 January – 4 March 2024
- Teams: 15

Final positions
- Champions: Persmin (3rd title)
- Runners-up: Persminsel
- Qualified for: 2023–24 Liga 3 National Phase

Tournament statistics
- Matches played: 39
- Goals scored: 147 (3.77 per match)
- All statistics correct as of 4 March 2024.

2023–24 Liga 3 North Sulawesi is the sixth edition of Liga 3 North Sulawesi organized by Asprov PSSI North Sulawesi.

Followed by 18 clubs. The winner of this competition will advance to the national phase representing North Sulawesi Province to advance to Liga 2.

Persmin is the defending champion after winning it in the season 2021.

== Teams ==
2023–24 Liga 3 North Sulawesi was attended by 15 teams.

No.	Team	Location
1	Bhayangkara Polda Sulut	Manado City
2	Bina Taruna	Manado City
3	Panzer Pegadaian	Manado City
4	PS Klabat XIII Jaya Sakti	Manado City
5	PS Mandiri	Manado City
6	Sulut	Manado City
7	Persbit	Bitung City
8	Bintang Muda Matali	Kotamobagu City
9	Rotasi Putra	Kotamobagu City
10	PSKT	Tomohon City
11	Persibolmut	North Bolaang Mongondow
12	Boltim	East Bolaang Mongondow Regency
13	Bolsel	South Bolaang Mongondow Regency
14	Persmin	Minahasa Regency
15	PSMU^{WD}	North Minahasa Regency
16	Persminsel	South Minahasa Regency

== Venues ==
- Maesa Tondano Stadium, Minahasa Regency
- Poyowa Besar II Field, Kotamobagu City
- Klabat Stadium, Manado City

== First round ==
A total of 18 teams will be drawn into 3 groups based on their geographical location. The 3 groups are as follows:

- Group 1 (Manado and Nusa Utara Islands Region)
- Group 2 (Greater Minahasa Region)
- Group 3 (Greater Bolaang Mongondow Region)

=== Group 1 ===
All matches will be held at Klabat Stadium, Manado City.

Pos	Team	Pld	W	D	L	GF	GA	GD	Pts	Qualification	KLA	PGD	SFC	BIN	MDR
1	PS Klabat XIII Jaya Sakti	4	3	1	0	15	2	+13	10	Qualified to Second round	—			4–1	3–0
2	Panzer Pegadaian	4	3	1	0	12	3	+9	10	Qualified to Second round	1–1	—	2–1		
3	Sulut	4	2	0	2	13	10	+3	6		0–7		—		9–1
4	Bina Taruna	4	1	0	3	5	11	−6	3			1–4	0–3	—	
5	PS Mandiri	4	0	0	4	1	20	−19	0			0–5		0–3	—

Source: Asprov PSSI North Sulawesi

=== Group 2 ===
All matches will be held at Maesa Tondano Stadium, Minahasa Regency.

Pos	Team	Pld	W	D	L	GF	GA	GD	Pts	Qualification	MIN	MSL	BIT	BHA	TOM
1	Persmin	4	3	1	0	8	1	+7	10	Qualified to Second round	—		0–0		3–1
2	Persminsel	4	2	1	1	6	3	+3	7	Qualified to Second round	0–2	—	3–1		
3	Persbit	4	1	2	1	6	5	+1	5				—	3–0	
4	Bhayangkara Polda Sulut	4	1	0	3	1	9	−8	3		0–3	0–3		—	
5	PSKT	4	0	2	2	3	6	−3	2			0–0	2–2	0–1	—

Source: Asprov PSSI North Sulawesi

=== Group 3 ===
All matches will be held at Poyowa Besar II Field, Kotamobagu City.

Pos	Team	Pld	W	D	L	GF	GA	GD	Pts	Qualification	BSL	BTM	ROT	BMM	MUT
1	Bolsel	4	3	1	0	12	1	+11	10	Qualified to Second round	—	0–0			7–0
2	Boltim	4	2	2	0	7	5	+2	8	Qualified to Second round		—	3–2	2–1	
3	Rotasi Putra	4	2	0	2	8	8	0	6		0–2		—	3–2	
4	Bintang Muda Matali	4	1	0	3	5	8	−3	3		1–3			—	1–0
5	Persibolmut	4	0	1	3	3	13	−10	1			2–2	1–3		—

Source: Asprov PSSI North Sulawesi

== Second round ==
=== Group D ===
Pos	Team	Pld	W	D	L	GF	GA	GD	Pts	Qualification	MSL	KLA	BSL
1	Persminsel	2	2	0	0	4	2	+2	6	Advance to Knockout round	—	2–1	
2	PS Klabat XIII Jaya Sakti	2	1	0	1	4	3	+1	3	Advance to Knockout round		—	3–1
3	Bolsel	2	0	0	2	2	5	−3	0		1–2		—

Source: Asprov PSSI North Sulawesi

=== Group E ===
Pos	Team	Pld	W	D	L	GF	GA	GD	Pts	Qualification	MIN	BTM	PGD
1	Persmin	2	2	0	0	17	0	+17	6	Advance to Knockout round	—		10–0
2	Boltim	2	1	0	1	3	9	−6	3	Advance to Knockout round	0–7	—	
3	Panzer Pegadaian	2	0	0	2	2	13	−11	0			2–3	—

Source: Asprov PSSI North Sulawesi

== Knockout round ==
=== Bracket ===
Semi-finals
2 March 2024 – Manado
D1	Persminsel	2
E2	Boltim	0
2 March 2024 – Minahasa
E1	Persmin	2 (4)
D2	PS Klabat XIII Jaya Sakti	2 (3)

Final
4 March 2024 – Manado
Persminsel	1
Persmin	3

=== Semi-finals ===
2 March 2024
14.30 WITA

Persminsel	2–0	Boltim
	Report

Klabat Stadium, Manado City

2 March 2024
14.30 WITA

Persmin	2–2 (a.e.t.)	PS Klabat XIII Jaya Sakti
	Report
Penalties
	4–3

Maesa Tondano Stadium, Minahasa Regency

=== Final ===
4 March 2024
14.00 WITA

Persminsel	1–3	Persmin
	Report

Klabat Stadium, Manado City

== Qualification to the national phase ==
Team	Method of qualification	Date of qualification	Qualified to
Persmin Minahasa	2023–24 Liga 3 North Sulawesi champions	4 March 2024	2023–24 Liga 3 National Phase

== See also ==
- 2023–24 Liga 3 National phase
