= Persmin Minahasa =

Indonesian football club

Persmin
- Full name: Perserikatan Sepakbola Minahasa
- Nickname: Manguni Makasiouw
- Founded: 1963; 63 years ago
- Ground: Maesa Stadium
- Capacity: 10,000
- Chairman: Renaldo Sengke
- Manager: Richo Roring
- Coach: Marthen Tao
- League: Liga 4
- 2025–26: 3rd in Group D (second round, North Sulawesi zone)
Home colours	Away colours

Perserikatan Sepakbola Minahasa, commonly known as Persmin Minahasa or simply known as Persmin, is an Indonesian football club based in Tondano, Minahasa Regency, North Sulawesi. The club was established in 1963 and plays its home matches at Maesa Stadium.

== History ==
Persmin was founded in 1963 in Tondano, Minahasa Regency. Over the decades, the club has competed in various tiers of Indonesian football league system, striving to make its mark on the national stage.

=== First Division (1998–2004) ===
During this period, First Division functioned as the second tier in the Indonesian football league system, equivalent to the current Championship (previously Liga 2). Persmin's early participation in national football began in the 1998–99 season in First Division. They reached the Top 8 after winning Group IV in the initial phase but secured only the fourth position in Group A of the Top 8. In the 1999–00 season, Persmin again failed to secure promotion to Premier Division after finishing third in the Eastern Group of First Division. The struggle continued in subsequent seasons with varying results until finally, in the 2004 season, Persmin earned promotion to Premier Division.

=== Premier Division (2005–2007) ===
At that time, Premier Division was the top tier in Indonesian football league system, equivalent to the current Super League (previously Liga 1). After their promotion in 2004, Persmin competed in Premier Division and displayed competitive performances. Their peak achievement occurred in the 2006 season when they reached the semifinals and secured third place. This accomplishment established Persmin as one of the "dark horse" teams in national football during that period.

=== Decline in performance and competition in Liga 3 ===
Following several seasons in Premier Division, Persmin experienced a decline in performance, leading to relegation to lower leagues. They then competed in Liga 3 (now called the Liga Nusantara), which is the third tier in the current league system. In 2024, Persmin clinched the Liga 3 North Sulawesi zone, title by defeating Persminsel South Minahasa with a score of 3–1 in the final held at Klabat Stadium, Manado.

=== Liga 4 era (2026–) ===
In 2026, Persmin played in the fourth (lowest) tier in the 2025–26 Liga 4 North Sulawesi. They only reached the second round after finishing in lowest position (3rd) in group D, after drawing 2–2 against Persminsel South Minahasa and lost in the latest match against Persma 1960 with a score of 0–1.

== Stadium ==
Persmin hosts its home matches at Maesa Stadium, located in Tondano. The stadium has a seating capacity of 15,000 and serves as a central hub for football activities in Minahasa.

== Players ==
=== Current squad ===
As of 30 March 2026

Note: Flags indicate national team as defined under FIFA eligibility rules; some limited exceptions apply. Players may hold more than one non-FIFA nationality.

No.	Pos.	Nation	Player
1	GK	IDN	Septi Karlos
2	DF	IDN	Reiner Adriano
4	DF	IDN	Rizal Bases
5	DF	IDN	Melky Idi
6	MF	IDN	Muhammad Reza
7	FW	IDN	Maichel Saureh
8	MF	IDN	Skyfel Mamahit
9	FW	IDN	Adrian Akhyadi
10	MF	IDN	Aliftha Rizky
11	FW	IDN	Bryan Salamuk
12	MF	IDN	Juan Valleron Fonataba
13	FW	IDN	Jhonn Victor Way
14	DF	IDN	Randika Fajar
15	DF	IDN	Brian Wanimbo
16	FW	IDN	Rafael Metusala
17	FW	IDN	Ajan Supu

No.	Pos.	Nation	Player
18	MF	IDN	Geovanni Sumala
19	DF	IDN	Nevil Saviola
20	GK	IDN	Nabil Busune
21	MF	IDN	Alpian Larenaung
22	MF	IDN	Melcior Majefat
23	DF	IDN	Ujang Saputra
24	DF	IDN	Fadel Suleman
25	DF	IDN	Deovano Rindegan
27	DF	IDN	Udin
28	MF	IDN	Krisjasen Parapak
29	DF	IDN	Zulkifli Husin
30	GK	IDN	Savio Josua
40	GK	IDN	Thierry Arjen
88	FW	IDN	Senior Mantow
99	FW	IDN	Junior Mantow

== Season-by-season records ==
Season(s)	League/Division	Tms.	Pos.	Piala Indonesia
1998–99	First Division	19	4th, Second round	–
1999–2000	First Division	24	3rd, East group	–
2001	First Division	23	4th, Second round	–
2002	First Division	27	3rd, Group 1	–
2003	First Division	26	5th, Group D	–
2004	First Division	24	5th, East division	–
2005	Premier Division	28	9th, East division	Round of 16
2006	Premier Division	28	Semi-final	Second round
2007–08	Premier Division	36	8th, East division	First round
2008–09				
2009–10
2010–11
2011–12
2013
2016	ISC Liga Nusantara	32	Eliminated in Provincial round	–
2017	Liga 3	32	Eliminated in Provincial round	–
2018	Liga 3	32	Eliminated in Regional round	–
2019	Liga 3	32	Eliminated in Regional round	–
2020	Liga 3	did not finish		–
2021–22	Liga 3	64	3rd, First round	–
2022–23	Liga 3	did not finish		–
2023–24	Liga 3	80	5th, First round	–

== Coaching staff ==
As of 3 September 2021

Position	Staff
Head coach	(Indonesia) Marthen Tao
Assistant coach	(Indonesia) Edwin Tampenawa
Assistant coach	(Indonesia) Edwin Umbas
Goalkeeper coach	(Indonesia) Jendri Pitoy

== Notable players ==
Several notable players have been associated with Persmin, including:

- (Brazil) (Indonesia) Fabiano Beltrame
- (Indonesia) (Timor-Leste) Miro Baldo Bento
- (Liberia) Eugene Gray
- (Indonesia) Djet Donald La'ala
- (Indonesia) Dirga Lasut
- (Indonesia) Michael Orah
- (Indonesia) Supriyono Salimin
- (Liberia) Sunday Seah
- (Indonesia) Siswanto
- (Indonesia) Zulkifli Syukur

== Honours ==
Liga Indonesia Premier Division

  - Semifinal: 2006
- Liga 3 North Sulawesi
  - Champions (3): 2018, 2021, 2023–24
  - Runners-up (1): 2019
