= 2000 Liga Indonesia Premier Division final =

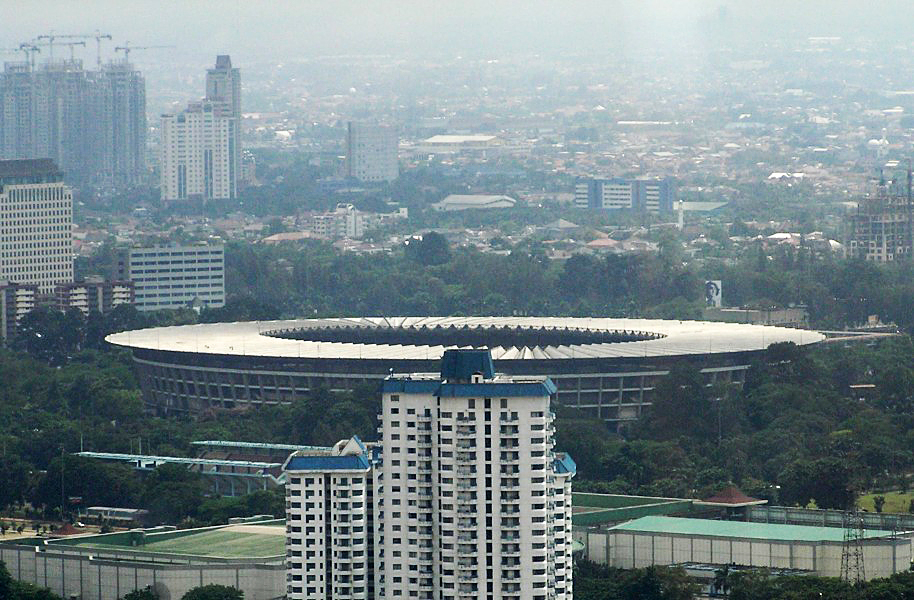
- The final was played at Gelora Senayan Main Stadium.
- Event: 1999–2000 Liga Indonesia Premier Division
PSM Makassar	Pupuk Kaltim
3	2
- Date: 23 July 2000
- Venue: Gelora Senayan Main Stadium, Jakarta
- Referee: Djadjat Sudradjat
- Attendance: 30,000
- Weather: Fine

The 2000 Liga Indonesia Premier Division final was a football match which was played on 23 July 2000 at Gelora Senayan Main Stadium in Jakarta. It was contested by PSM Makassar and Pupuk Kaltim to determine the winner of the 1999–2000 Liga Indonesia Premier Division. PSM Makassar won the match 3–2 to claim their first-ever professional title.

== Road to the final ==
PSM Makassar		Round	Pupuk Kaltim	
Main article: 1999–2000 Liga Indonesia Premier Division first stage: East Region: Pos / Team / Pld / W / D / L / GF / GA / GD / Pts; 1 / PSM Makassar / 26 / 16 / 8 / 2 / 41 / 13 / +28 / 56; 2 / Arema Malang / 26 / 14 / 5 / 7 / 31 / 18 / +13 / 47; 3 / Pupuk Kaltim / 26 / 15 / 3 / 8 / 45 / 25 / +20 / 48; 4 / Pelita Solo / 26 / 12 / 9 / 5 / 31 / 18 / +13 / 45; 5 / Persipura Jayapura / 26 / 11 / 7 / 8 / 37 / 24 / +13 / 40; 6 / Persebaya Surabaya / 26 / 9 / 8 / 9 / 31 / 25 / +6 / 35; 7 / Persma Manado / 26 / 10 / 5 / 11 / 34 / 29 / +5 / 35; 8 / Persema Malang / 26 / 8 / 10 / 8 / 27 / 26 / +1 / 34; 9 / Barito Putra / 26 / 9 / 5 / 12 / 22 / 35 / −13 / 32; 10 / Petrokimia Putra / 26 / 8 / 7 / 11 / 27 / 38 / −11 / 31; 11 / Putra Samarinda / 26 / 8 / 4 / 14 / 28 / 42 / −14 / 28; 12 / Gelora Dewata / 26 / 7 / 6 / 13 / 25 / 41 / −16 / 27; 13 / PSIS Semarang / 26 / 6 / 6 / 14 / 22 / 32 / −10 / 24; 14 / PSIM Yogyakarta / 26 / 4 / 7 / 15 / 15 / 50 / −35 / 19; Source: RSSSF		First stage	Main article: 1999–2000 Liga Indonesia Premier Division first stage: East Region: Pos / Team / Pld / W / D / L / GF / GA / GD / Pts; 1 / PSM Makassar / 26 / 16 / 8 / 2 / 41 / 13 / +28 / 56; 2 / Arema Malang / 26 / 14 / 5 / 7 / 31 / 18 / +13 / 47; 3 / Pupuk Kaltim / 26 / 15 / 3 / 8 / 45 / 25 / +20 / 48; 4 / Pelita Solo / 26 / 12 / 9 / 5 / 31 / 18 / +13 / 45; 5 / Persipura Jayapura / 26 / 11 / 7 / 8 / 37 / 24 / +13 / 40; 6 / Persebaya Surabaya / 26 / 9 / 8 / 9 / 31 / 25 / +6 / 35; 7 / Persma Manado / 26 / 10 / 5 / 11 / 34 / 29 / +5 / 35; 8 / Persema Malang / 26 / 8 / 10 / 8 / 27 / 26 / +1 / 34; 9 / Barito Putra / 26 / 9 / 5 / 12 / 22 / 35 / −13 / 32; 10 / Petrokimia Putra / 26 / 8 / 7 / 11 / 27 / 38 / −11 / 31; 11 / Putra Samarinda / 26 / 8 / 4 / 14 / 28 / 42 / −14 / 28; 12 / Gelora Dewata / 26 / 7 / 6 / 13 / 25 / 41 / −16 / 27; 13 / PSIS Semarang / 26 / 6 / 6 / 14 / 22 / 32 / −10 / 24; 14 / PSIM Yogyakarta / 26 / 4 / 7 / 15 / 15 / 50 / −35 / 19; Source: RSSSF	
Main article: 1999–2000 Liga Indonesia Premier Division second stage: Group A: Pos / Team / Pld / W / D / L / GF / GA / GD / Pts; 1 / PSM Makassar / 3 / 3 / 0 / 0 / 8 / 4 / +4 / 9; 2 / Pupuk Kaltim / 3 / 1 / 1 / 1 / 4 / 4 / 0 / 4; 3 / Persijatim / 3 / 0 / 2 / 1 / 3 / 5 / −2 / 2; 4 / PSMS Medan / 3 / 0 / 1 / 2 / 2 / 4 / −2 / 1; Source: RSSSF		Second stage	Main article: 1999–2000 Liga Indonesia Premier Division second stage: Group A: Pos / Team / Pld / W / D / L / GF / GA / GD / Pts; 1 / PSM Makassar / 3 / 3 / 0 / 0 / 8 / 4 / +4 / 9; 2 / Pupuk Kaltim / 3 / 1 / 1 / 1 / 4 / 4 / 0 / 4; 3 / Persijatim / 3 / 0 / 2 / 1 / 3 / 5 / −2 / 2; 4 / PSMS Medan / 3 / 0 / 1 / 2 / 2 / 4 / −2 / 1; Source: RSSSF	
Opponent	Result	Knockout stage	Opponent	Result
Persija Jakarta	1–0	Semifinals	Persikota Tangerang	0–0 (3–4 pen.)

== Match details ==
23 July 2000
17:30 WIB

PSM Makassar	3–2	Pupuk Kaltim
Kurniawan 39', 73'; Rachman 55'		Aris 75'; Fakhri 80' (pen.)

Gelora Senayan Main Stadium, Jakarta
Attendance: 30,000
Referee: Djadjat Sudradjat

PSM Makassar
Pupuk Kaltim

PSM Makassar:
GK	20	(Indonesia) Hendro Kartiko
CB	19	(Cameroon) Yoseph Lewono	(yellow card) 41'
CB	23	(Indonesia) Ronny Ririn
CB	14	(Indonesia) Syamsuddin Batolla
RM	12	(Indonesia) Yuniarto Budi
CM	22	(Brazil) Carlos de Mello
CM	11	(Indonesia) Bima Sakti (c)
CM	7	(Indonesia) Yusrifar Jafar		(substituted off) 68'
LM	26	(Indonesia) Ortizan Solossa
CF	9	(Indonesia) Miro Baldo Bento		(substituted off) 14'
CF	17	(Indonesia) Kurniawan Dwi Yulianto
Substitutes:
DF	3	(Indonesia) Aji Santoso		(substituted on) 68'
DF	3	(Indonesia) Ali Baba		(substituted on) 79'
CF	16	(Indonesia) Rachman Usman		(substituted on) 14'	(substituted off) 79'
Head Coach:
(Indonesia) Syamsuddin Umar

Pupuk Kaltim:
GK	1	(Indonesia) Sumardi
CB	14	(Indonesia) Djet Donald La'ala
CB	15	(Indonesia) Ridwansyah
CB	22	(Indonesia) Firdaus Nyong
RM	6	(Indonesia) Zulkifli		(substituted off) 46'
CM	18	(Indonesia) Aris Budi Prasetyo	(yellow card) 65'
CM	8	(Indonesia) Mansyur
CM	19	(Indonesia) Ardiansyah	(yellow card) 35'	(substituted off) 70'
CM	7	(Indonesia) Fakhri Husaini (c)
LM	5	(Indonesia) Ponaryo Astaman		(substituted off) 61'
CF	10	(Indonesia) Marthen Tao
Substitutes:
DF	4	(Indonesia) Pujo Semedi		(substituted on) 61'
MF	12	(Indonesia) Yudhi Kuncahyo		(substituted on) 70'
CF	11	(Indonesia) Joko Herianto		(substituted on) 46'
Head Coach:
(Indonesia) Soengkowo Soediharto
