= 1999 Liga Indonesia Premier Division final =

- Event: 1998–99 Liga Indonesia Premier Division
Persebaya Surabaya	PSIS Semarang
0	1
- Date: 9 April 1999
- Venue: Klabat Stadium, Manado
- Referee: Djadjat Sudradjat
- Attendance: 30,000
- Weather: Fine

The 1999 Liga Indonesia Premier Division final was a football match which was played on 9 April 1999 at Klabat Stadium in Manado. It was contested by Persebaya Surabaya and PSIS Semarang to determine the winner of the 1998–99 Liga Indonesia Premier Division. PSIS won the match 1–0 thanks to a late goal from Tugiyo. With the result, PSIS claim their first-ever professional title.

== Road to the final ==
Persebaya Surabaya		Round	Bandung Raya	
Main article: 1998–99 Liga Indonesia Premier Division first stage: Central Region Group D: Pos / Team / Pld / W / D / L / GF / GA / GD / Pts; 1 / Persebaya Surabaya / 8 / 5 / 2 / 1 / 13 / 5 / +8 / 17; 2 / PSIS Semarang / 8 / 3 / 2 / 3 / 10 / 7 / +3 / 11; 3 / Barito Putra / 8 / 3 / 1 / 4 / 8 / 10 / −2 / 10; 4 / Persema Malang / 8 / 2 / 3 / 3 / 10 / 13 / −3 / 9; 5 / Gelora Dewata / 8 / 2 / 2 / 4 / 7 / 13 / −6 / 8; Source: RSSSF		First stage	Main article: 1998–99 Liga Indonesia Premier Division first stage: Central Region Group D: Pos / Team / Pld / W / D / L / GF / GA / GD / Pts; 1 / Persebaya Surabaya / 8 / 5 / 2 / 1 / 13 / 5 / +8 / 17; 2 / PSIS Semarang / 8 / 3 / 2 / 3 / 10 / 7 / +3 / 11; 3 / Barito Putra / 8 / 3 / 1 / 4 / 8 / 10 / −2 / 10; 4 / Persema Malang / 8 / 2 / 3 / 3 / 10 / 13 / −3 / 9; 5 / Gelora Dewata / 8 / 2 / 2 / 4 / 7 / 13 / −6 / 8; Source: RSSSF	
Main article: 1998–99 Liga Indonesia Premier Division second stage: Group P: Pos / Team / Pld / W / D / L / GF / GA / GD / Pts; 1 / Persebaya Surabaya / 4 / 3 / 1 / 0 / 9 / 3 / +6 / 10; 2 / PSIS Semarang / 4 / 2 / 1 / 1 / 6 / 6 / 0 / 7; 3 / Semen Padang / 4 / 1 / 3 / 0 / 10 / 5 / +5 / 6; 4 / Persikota Tangerang / 4 / 0 / 2 / 2 / 3 / 5 / −2 / 2; 5 / Petrokimia Putra / 4 / 0 / 1 / 3 / 2 / 11 / −9 / 1; Source: RSSSF		Second stage	Main article: 1998–99 Liga Indonesia Premier Division second stage: Group P: Pos / Team / Pld / W / D / L / GF / GA / GD / Pts; 1 / Persebaya Surabaya / 4 / 3 / 1 / 0 / 9 / 3 / +6 / 10; 2 / PSIS Semarang / 4 / 2 / 1 / 1 / 6 / 6 / 0 / 7; 3 / Semen Padang / 4 / 1 / 3 / 0 / 10 / 5 / +5 / 6; 4 / Persikota Tangerang / 4 / 0 / 2 / 2 / 3 / 5 / −2 / 2; 5 / Petrokimia Putra / 4 / 0 / 1 / 3 / 2 / 11 / −9 / 1; Source: RSSSF	
Opponent	Result	Knockout stage	Opponent	Result
PSMS Medan	1–1 (4–2 pen.)	Semifinals	Persija Jakarta	1–0

== Match details ==
9 April 1999
16:30 WITA

Persebaya Surabaya	0–1	PSIS Semarang
		Tugiyo 89'

Klabat Stadium, Manado
Attendance: 30,000
Referee: Djadjat Sudradjat

Persebaya Surabaya
PSIS Semarang

Persebaya Surabaya:
GK	1	(Indonesia) Hendro Kartiko
CB	17	(Indonesia) Khairil Anwar
CB	5	(Indonesia) Sugiantoro
CB	27	(Cameroon) Yoseph Lewono
RM	2	(Indonesia) Anang Ma'ruf	(substituted off) 88'
CM	9	(Indonesia) Uston Nawawi
CM	19	(Indonesia) Eri Irianto
CM	12	(Indonesia) Yusuf Ekodono	(substituted off) 57'
LM	3	(Indonesia) Aji Santoso (c)
CF	7	(Indonesia) Reinald Pieters	(substituted off) 62'
CF	26	(Sierra Leone) Musa Kallon
Substitutes:
DF	8	(Indonesia) Hartono	(substituted on) 88'
MF	10	(Indonesia) Achmad Ariadi	(substituted on) 57'
FW	14	(Indonesia) Putut Wijanarko	(substituted on) 62'
Head Coach:
(Indonesia) Rusdy Bahalwan

PSIS Semarang:
GK	1	(Indonesia) I Komang Putra
CB	3	(Cameroon) Simon Atangana
CB	5	(Indonesia) Bonggo Pribadi
CB	15	(Indonesia) Wasis Purwoko
RM	16	(Indonesia) Agung Setyabudi
CM	8	(Indonesia) Ali Sunan (c)
CM	7	(Indonesia) Imran Amirullah	(substituted off) 73'
CM	13	(Cameroon) Ebanda Timothy
LM	14	(Indonesia) M. Soleh
CF	17	(Burkina Faso) Ali Shaha
CF	10	(Indonesia) Tugiyo
Substitutes:
MF	21	(Indonesia) Deftendi Yunianto	(substituted on) 73'
Head Coach:
(Indonesia) Edy Paryono
