= UNIMA (disambiguation) =

UNIMA is the Union Internationale de la Marionnette - International Puppetry Association.

Unima is a Madagascan company.

UNIMA may also refer to:

- University of Malawi, Malawi
- Manado State University, Indonesia
