= Kusno Danupoyo =

Indonesian nationalist and politician

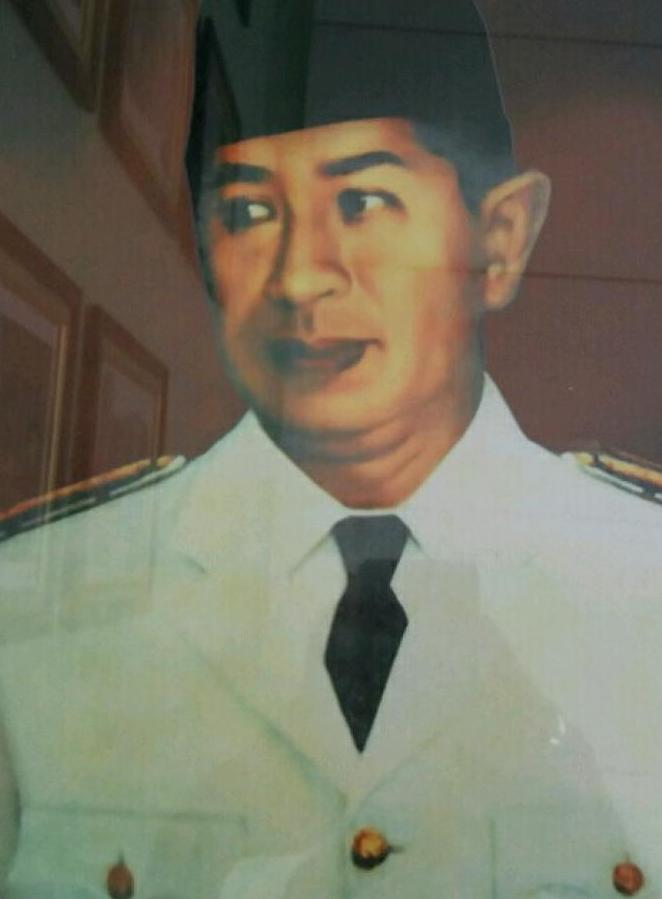

1st Governor of Lampung
- In office 1964–1967
- Preceded by: Position created
- Succeeded by: Zainal Abidin Pagaralam

Personal details
- Born: 12 August 1913 Surakarta, Dutch East Indies
- Died: 6 May 1967 (aged 53) Jakarta, Indonesia

Kusno Danupoyo (12 August 1913 – 6 May 1967) was an Indonesian nationalist and politician who was the first governor of Lampung, serving from 1964 to 1966. Prior to becoming governor, he had been active in Indonesian nationalist movements in the Gorontalo region during the Japanese occupation.

== Early life ==
Kusno Danupoyo was born on 12 August 1913 in Surakarta, today in Central Java. He is a descendant of a grandson of the Sunan of Surakarta Pakubuwono IV, who had been exiled to Tondano's Kampung Jawa before one of his children returned to Surakarta. Sometime during his childhood, Danupoyo's family moved to Gorontalo.

== Career ==
In 1942, while the Japanese invaded and seized the Dutch East Indies, Dutch authorities in Gorontalo opted to conduct a scorched earth policy. After the destruction of copra and oil warehouses on 16 January 1942, locals in Gorontalo held a meeting at Danupoyo's Gorontalo home. They decided to formed a committee to oppose the scorched earth actions, led by Nani Wartabone with Danupoyo as Wartabone's deputy. The group moved to capture Dutch officials in Gorontalo before they could destroy further infrastructure such as bridges and fuel stocks, and on 23 January 1942 proclaimed Indonesian independence, three and a half years before the 1945 proclamation by Sukarno and Hatta.

After seizing power, the committee formed a provisional government in Gorontalo where Danupoyo was head of civilian affairs. The provisional government maintained power until around June 1942, when Japanese forces arrived and took over government of the region. Leaders of the provisional government such as Wartabone were relegated to an advisory role. As the war turned against Japan, former local leaders were given increased role, and in early 1945 Danupoyo was appointed into a preparatory committee. Upon Japan's surrender, governance in Gorontalo was handed to the committee on 21 August 1945. During the ensuing Indonesian National Revolution, Danupoyo was arrested by the Dutch in 1949 when he was sent by Republican governor-in-exile of Sulawesi Sam Ratulangi in an attempt to establish contact between the Republican government in Java and nationalists in Sulawesi.

When the province of Lampung was split off from South Sumatra in 1964, Danupoyo was appointed as its first governor. He died in Jakarta on 6 May 1967 due to an illness, and was buried the following day at the Karet Bivak Cemetery. A street in Gorontalo City is named after him.
