= Djet Donald La'ala =

Indonesian footballer

Jet Donald La'ala
Personal information
- Date of birth: 13 December 1971 (age 54)
- Place of birth: Banggai, Indonesia
- Height: 1.75 m (5 ft 9 in)
- Position: Defender

Senior career*
Years	Team	Apps	(Gls)
1994–1997	Palu Putra	35	(2)
1997–2002	Pupuk Kaltim Bontang	78	(6)
2002–2003	PSM Makassar	24	(0)
2004–2005	Persija Jakarta	25	(1)
2005–2006	Persmin Minahasa	23	(0)
2006–2007	Persma Manado	18	(0)
Total		253	(9)

International career
2000–2004	Indonesia	17	(0)
- * Club domestic league appearances and goals

Jet Donald La'ala (born 13 December 1971) is an Indonesian former football defender. He played for Indonesia in the 2000 Asian Cup. He also played for Palu Putra, Pupuk Kaltim Bontang, PSM Makassar, Persija Jakarta, Persmin Minahasa, and Persma Manado.

== Honours ==
Pupuk Kaltim Bontang

- Liga Indonesia Premier Division runner up: 1999–2000

Indonesia

- AFF Championship runner-up: 2000
