= Kampung Jawa, Minahasa =

Village in North Sulawesi, Indonesia

Kampung Jawa
- Kelurahan
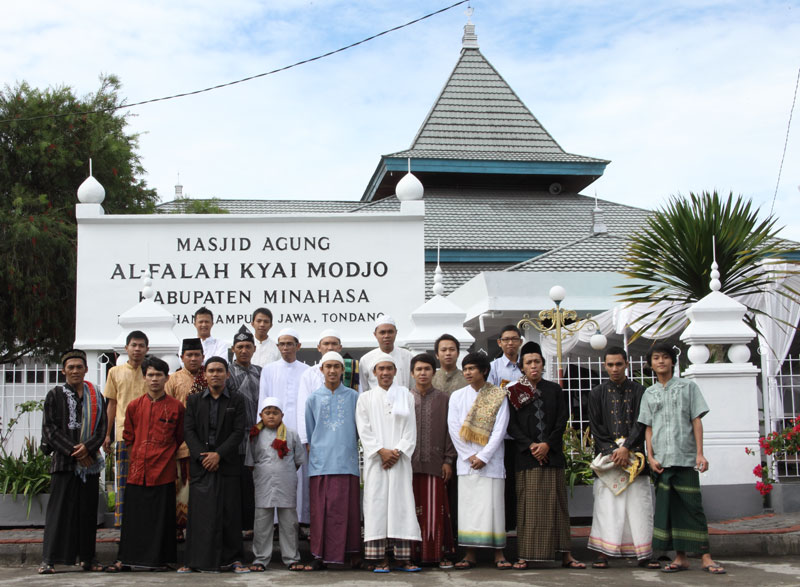
- Tondano Javanese inhabitants of Kampung Jawa.

- Location of Kampung Jawa in North Sulawesi
- Coordinates: 1°18′42″N 124°55′13″E
- Country: Indonesia
- Province: North Sulawesi
- Regency: Minahasa
- District: North Tondano
- Founded: 3 May 1830

Area
  - Total: 0.45 km^{2} (0.17 sq mi)

Population (2023)
  - Total: 2,692
  - Density: 6,000/km^{2} (15,000/sq mi)
- Time zone: UTC+8 (Central Indonesia Time)

Kampung Jawa is a kelurahan (urban village) of North Tondano district, Minahasa Regency, North Sulawesi, Indonesia. It was founded in the 19th century by Javanese exiles from the Java War, before growing in the subsequent decades through the influx of further exiles and migration of the local Minahasan population. It has since become a majority Muslim settlement within the mostly Christian region of Minahasa, retaining some Javanese identity as "Tondano Javanese" while being mostly Minahasan culturally. As of 2023, Kampung Jawa had a population of 2,692 people.

== History ==
The Minahasa inland region near Lake Tondano fell under Dutch control in 1809. In the aftermath of the Java War of 1825–1830, the Dutch exiled key Javanese rebel leader Kyai Maja to the region with 62 followers, expecting local Minahasans to keep the exiles in check. The Javanese were also expected to establish rice paddies in the region to increase the region's agricultural productivity. The group's arrival is celebrated as Kampung Jawa's founding date, on 3 May 1830.

The group saw other influxes of population from other exiles throughout the nineteenth century: first from the followers of Prince Diponegoro not allowed to accompany him to Makassar, then further exiles from Cirebon, Banten, Padang, and Banjarmasin. The new exiles and their descendants assimilated into the village's cultural identity.

By 1902, the village had a population of over 1,000, which included natural population growth and voluntary migration of local Minahasans and other groups to the village. The increased population led to external settlement, and by 1981 there were six other villages in Gorontalo, North Sulawesi, and Halmahera which had been founded by migrants from Kampung Jawa. Some of the migrants from Kampung Jawa moved to Java, with one descendant – Kusno Danupoyo – becoming governor of Lampung.

During the Permesta rebellion in the 1950s, the inhabitants of Kampung Jawa were seen by the Permesta rebel forces as Indonesian government loyalists, with several inhabitants missing after being taken away by the rebels.

== Culture ==
In contrast to the surrounding Minahasan people who are Christians, inhabitants of Kampung Jawa are mostly Muslim. The inhabitants speak Minahasan languages with several Javanese loanwords, although they retained the use of Javanese dress during cultural ceremonies. Ethnically, Kampung Jawa inhabitants broadly identify as Jawa Tondano (Tondano Javanese) or Jaton. The village was also known as a center for blacksmithing until sometime in the twentieth century.

== Demographics ==
Statistics Indonesia estimated the population of Kampung Jawa as 2,692 as of 2023, making it the most populous subdivision of the North Tondano district. The Tondano Javanese identity also covered the neighborhood of Tegalrejo, administratively within the neighboring village of Tonsea Lama.
