= North Tondano =

District of Indonesia

- District
- Location of North Tondano in North Sulawesi
- Coordinates: 1°19′13″N 124°55′19″E
- Country: Indonesia
- Province: North Sulawesi
- Regency: Minahasa Regency

Area
  - Total: 41.66 km^{2} (16.09 sq mi)

Population (2023)
  - Total: 13,122
  - Density: 315.0/km^{2} (815.8/sq mi)
- Time zone: UTC+8 (Central Indonesia Time)

North Tondano is a district (kecamatan) of Minahasa Regency, in the North Sulawesi province of Indonesia.

It is subdivided into three rural villages and five urban villages. Its most populous village is the urban village of Kampung Jawa. The administrative center is located at the urban village of Tonsea Lama.
