= 1998–99 Liga Indonesia Premier Division =

Football season in Indonesia

Liga Indonesia Premier Division
- Season: 1998–99
- Dates: 1 November 1998 – 9 April 1999
- Champions: PSIS; 1st Premier Division title 2nd Indonesian title
- Relegated: Persita; Persikabo; Persiba
- Asian Club Championship: PSIS
- Asian Cup Winners' Cup: Persebaya
- Matches: 153
- Goals: 364 (2.38 per match)
- Top goalscorer: Alain Mabenda (11 goals)
- Biggest home win: Persija 5–0 Petrokimia Putra (13 December 1998)
- Biggest away win: Medan Jaya 0–3 PSDS (15 November 1998); Persiraja 0–3 PSDS (14 February 1999)
- Highest scoring: Semen Padang 6–1 Petrokimia Putra (26 March 1999)

The 1998–99 Liga Indonesia Premier Division was the fifth season of the Liga Indonesia Premier Division, the top division of Indonesian football. The season began on 1 November 1998 and ended on 9 April 1999. The league was made up of 28 clubs. PSIS won the title after beating the defending champions, Persebaya 1–0 in the final.

== Teams ==
=== Team changes ===
The number of teams dropped from 31 to 28 this season.

==== Withdrew from Premier Division ====
- Mitra Surabaya
- PSB

==== Disbanded ====
- Arseto

=== Name changes ===
- Pelita Jakarta changed their name to Pelita Bakrie.

=== Stadiums and locations ===
Locations of the teams in the 1998–99 Liga Indonesia Premier Division.
Blue: West Region; Yellow: Central Region; Red: East Region

West Region
Team	Location	Stadium
Medan Jaya	Medan	Teladan
Persib	Bandung	Siliwangi
Persija	Jakarta (Central Jakarta)	Lebak Bulus
Persiraja	Banda Aceh	Haji Dimurthala
Persita	Tangerang	Benteng
Petrokimia Putra	Gresik	Petrokimia
PSBL	Bandar Lampung	Pahoman
PSDS	Deli Serdang	Baharuddin Siregar
PSMS	Medan	Teladan
PSP	Padang	Haji Agus Salim
Semen Padang	Padang	Haji Agus Salim

Central Region
Team	Location	Stadium
Arema	Malang	Gajayana
Barito Putera	Banjarmasin	May 17th
Gelora Dewata	Denpasar	Ngurah Rai
Pelita Bakrie	Jakarta (South Jakarta)	Lebak Bulus
Persebaya	Surabaya	Gelora 10 November
Persema	Malang	Gajayana
Persikab	Cimahi	Sangkuriang
Persikabo	Bogor	Pajajaran
Persikota	Tangerang	Benteng
PSIM	Mataram	Mandala Krida
PSIS	Semarang	Jatidiri

East Region
Team	Location	Stadium
Persiba	Balikpapan	Persiba
Persipura	Jayapura	Mandala
Persma	Manado	Klabat
PSM	Ujung Pandang	Andi Mattalata
Pupuk Kaltim	Bontang	Mulawarman
Putra Samarinda	Samarinda	Segiri Samarinda

== First stage ==
=== West Region ===
==== Group A ====
Pos	Team	Pld	W	D	L	GF	GA	GD	Pts	Qualification
1	PSMS	10	6	2	2	17	14	+3	20	Advance to second stage
2	Semen Padang	10	5	3	2	16	8	+8	18	Advance to second stage
3	PSDS	10	4	4	2	17	11	+6	16	
4	Medan Jaya	10	3	2	5	6	14	−8	11	
5	PSP	10	1	5	4	10	11	−1	8	
6	Persiraja (O)	10	1	4	5	8	16	−8	7	Qualification to relegation play-offs

Source: RSSSF
(O) Play-off winners

==== Group B ====
Pos	Team	Pld	W	D	L	GF	GA	GD	Pts	Qualification
1	Persija	8	4	3	1	13	4	+9	15	Advance to second stage
2	Petrokimia Putra	8	3	4	1	13	15	−2	13	Advance to second stage
3	Persib	8	3	1	4	9	10	−1	10	
4	PSBL	8	1	4	3	9	10	−1	7	
5	Persita (R)	8	1	4	3	9	14	−5	7	Qualification to relegation play-offs

Source: RSSSF
(R) Relegated

==== Relegation play-offs ====
14 March 1999

Persita	4–1	Persiraja

21 March 1999

Persiraja	3–0	Persita

Persiraja won 4–4 on aggregate on away goals and retained their spot in the Premier Division, Persita were relegated.

=== Central Region ===
==== Group C ====
Pos	Team	Pld	W	D	L	GF	GA	GD	Pts	Qualification
1	Persikota	10	6	2	2	14	7	+7	20	Advance to second stage
2	Pelita Bakrie	10	6	2	2	14	8	+6	20	Advance to second stage
3	Arema	10	4	3	3	10	6	+4	15	
4	Persikab	10	3	4	3	9	12	−3	13	
5	PSIM	10	2	2	6	7	11	−4	8	
6	Persikabo (R)	10	1	3	6	8	18	−10	6	Qualification to relegation play-offs

Source: RSSSF
(R) Relegated

==== Group D ====
Pos	Team	Pld	W	D	L	GF	GA	GD	Pts	Qualification
1	Persebaya	8	5	2	1	13	5	+8	17	Advance to second stage
2	PSIS (C)	8	3	2	3	10	7	+3	11	Advance to second stage
3	Barito Putera	8	3	1	4	8	10	−2	10	
4	Persema	8	2	3	3	10	13	−3	9	
5	Gelora Dewata (O)	8	2	2	4	7	13	−6	8	Qualification to relegation play-offs

Source: RSSSF
(O) Play-off winners

==== Relegation play-offs ====
14 March 1999

Gelora Dewata	5–1	Persikabo

21 March 1999

Persikabo	4–2	Gelora Dewata

Gelora Dewata won 7–5 on aggregate and retained their spot in the Premier Division, Persikabo were relegated.

=== East Region ===
==== Group E ====
Pos	Team	Pld	W	D	L	GF	GA	GD	Pts	Qualification or relegation
1	Pupuk Kaltim	10	5	2	3	11	9	+2	17	Advance to second stage
2	PSM	10	5	1	4	13	11	+2	16	Advance to second stage
3	Persma	10	5	1	4	13	12	+1	16	
4	Putra Samarinda	10	4	0	6	14	15	−1	12	
5	Persipura	10	3	3	4	15	16	−1	12	
6	Persiba (R)	10	3	3	4	10	13	−3	12	Relegation to First Division

Source: RSSSF
(R) Relegated

== Second stage ==
=== Group P ===
Pos	Team	Pld	W	D	L	GF	GA	GD	Pts	Qualification
1	Persebaya	4	3	1	0	9	3	+6	10	Advance to knockout stage
2	PSIS	4	2	1	1	6	6	0	7	Advance to knockout stage
3	Semen Padang	4	1	3	0	10	5	+5	6	
4	Persikota	4	0	2	2	3	5	−2	2	
5	Petrokimia Putra	4	0	1	3	2	11	−9	1	

Source: RSSSF

=== Group Q ===
Pos	Team	Pld	W	D	L	GF	GA	GD	Pts	Qualification
1	Persija	4	2	2	0	6	4	+2	8	Advance to knockout stage
2	PSMS	4	1	3	0	3	2	+1	6	Advance to knockout stage
3	Pelita Bakrie	4	1	2	1	4	2	+2	5	
4	Pupuk Kaltim	4	1	1	2	3	6	−3	4	
5	PSM	4	0	2	2	1	3	−2	2	

Source: RSSSF

== Knockout stage ==
Semifinals
1 April – Jakarta
Persebaya (pen.)	1 (4)
PSMS	1 (2)
1 April – Jakarta
Persija	0
PSIS	1

Final
9 April – Manado
Persebaya	0
PSIS	1

=== Semifinals ===
1 April 1999
15:30 WIB

Persebaya	1–1	PSMS
Yusuf 70'		Baboaken 83'
Penalties
	4–2

Gelora Senayan Main Stadium, Jakarta

1 April 1999
19:00 WIB

Persija	0–1	PSIS
		Timothy 83'

Gelora Senayan Main Stadium, Jakarta

=== Final ===
9 April 1999
16:30 WITA

Persebaya	0–1	PSIS
		Tugiyo 89'

Klabat Stadium, Manado
Attendance: 30,000
Referee: Djadjat Sudradjat

== Awards ==
=== Top scorer ===
The following is a list of the top scorers from the 1998-99 season.

Rank	Player	Club	Goals
1	(Gabon) Alain Mabenda	PSDS	11
2	(Sierra Leone) Musa Kallon	Persebaya	8
3	(Cameroon) Jean Michel Babouaken	PSMS	7
3	(Liberia) Stephen Weah	Persikota	7
3	(Indonesia) Tugiyo	PSIS	7

=== Best player ===
- (Indonesia) Ali Sunan (PSIS)

=== Fair play team ===
- Semen Padang
