= Manado State University =

Public university

- Universitas Negeri Manado
- Other name: UNIMA
- Type: State university
- Established: 22 September 1955; 71 years ago
- Rector: Prof. Dr. Deitje A. Katuuk, M.Pd
- Academic staff: 300+
- Students: 17,000+
- Location: Jl. Raya Tondano, Koya, South Tondano, Tondano, Minahasa Regency, North Sulawesi, 95618, Indonesia; 01°16′00″N 124°52′59″E
- Campus: Urban
- Language: Manado Malay, English
- Website: UNIMA.ac.id

Manado State University (Indonesian: Universitas Negeri Manado) (UNIMA) is a public university in Tondano, North Sulawesi (Sulawesi Utara), on a hill in Tonsaru Tataaran Tondano, Minahasa Regency, North Sulawesi, Indonesia. The university was established on 22 September 1955; 71 years ago. It is currently led by Prof. Dr. Deitje A. Katuuk, M.Pd.

== History ==
UNIMA derived from the Higher Education Teacher Education (abbreviated PTPG in Bahasa Indonesian); one of four PTPG first established in Indonesia: PTPG Batusangkar, PTPG Malang, Bandung PTPG, PTPG Tondano; based on the Decree of the Minister of Education and Culture.

PTPG Tondano underwent several changes: at first the Guidance and Counseling University of Hasanuddin Makassar, then turned into FKIP Unhas Tondano in Manado, FKIP Sulteng (Sulawesi Tengah), IKIP Branch Yogyakarta at Manado, and the latter being a stand-alone IKIP based PTIP Decree No. 38 dated 8 March 1965; 61 years ago.

On 13 September 2000, IKIP converted and upgraded to Manado State University, and was inaugurated by the Minister of National Education Republic of Indonesia Yahya Muhaimin on 14 October 2000.

== Faculty ==
The university has nine faculties:

Diploma and Undergraduate programmes

- Faculty of Engineering (FT)
- Faculty of Mathematics and Natural Sciences (FMIPA)
- Faculty of Social Sciences and Law (FIS)
- Faculty of Languages and Art (FBS)
- Faculty of Economics and Business (FE)
- Faculty of Education and Psychology (FIP)
- Faculty of Sport Science (FIK)

Graduate programme

- UNIMA Postgraduate

Professional programme

- Teacher Professional Education Programme

== Gallery ==
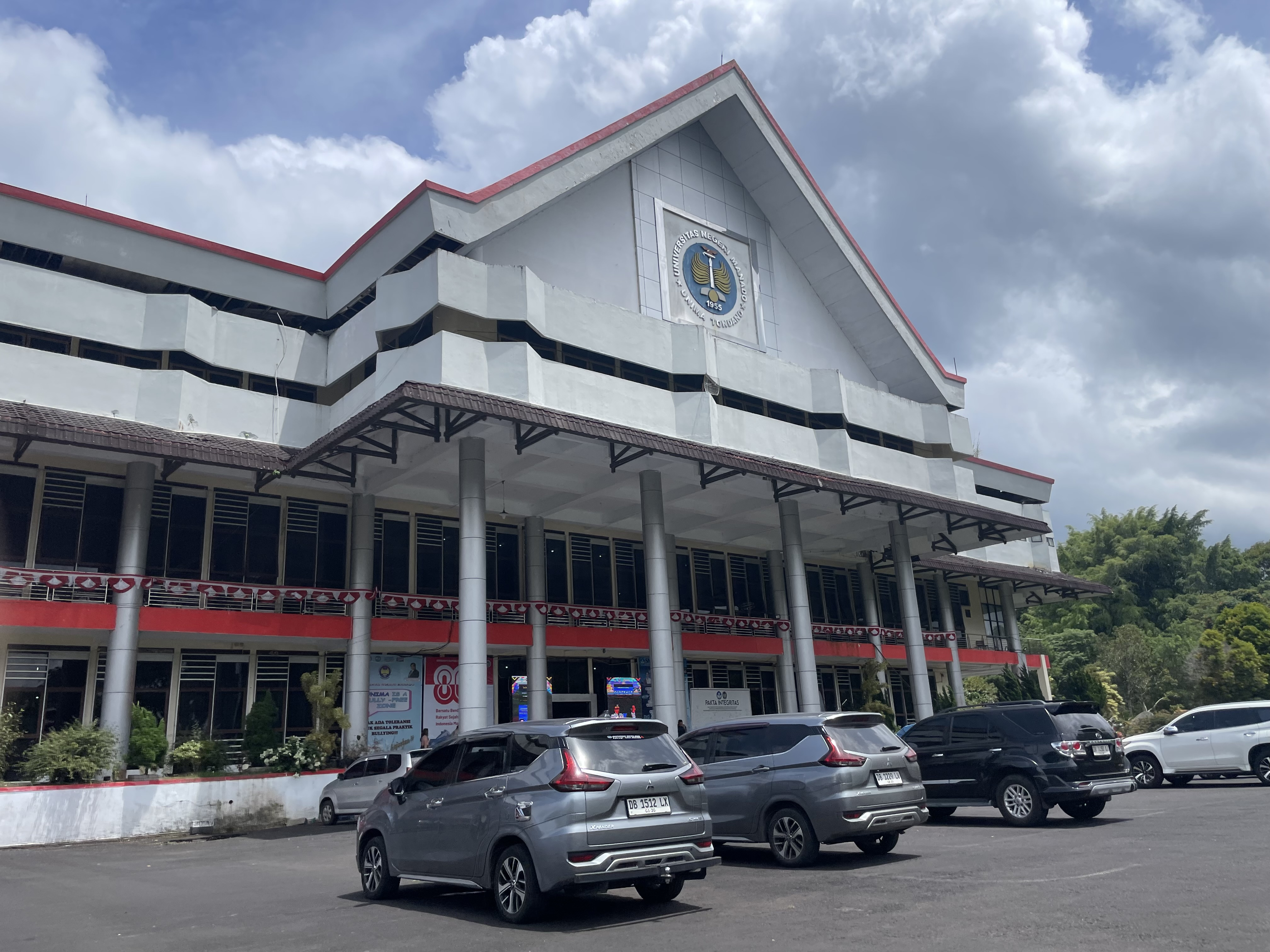
UNIMA Head Office building

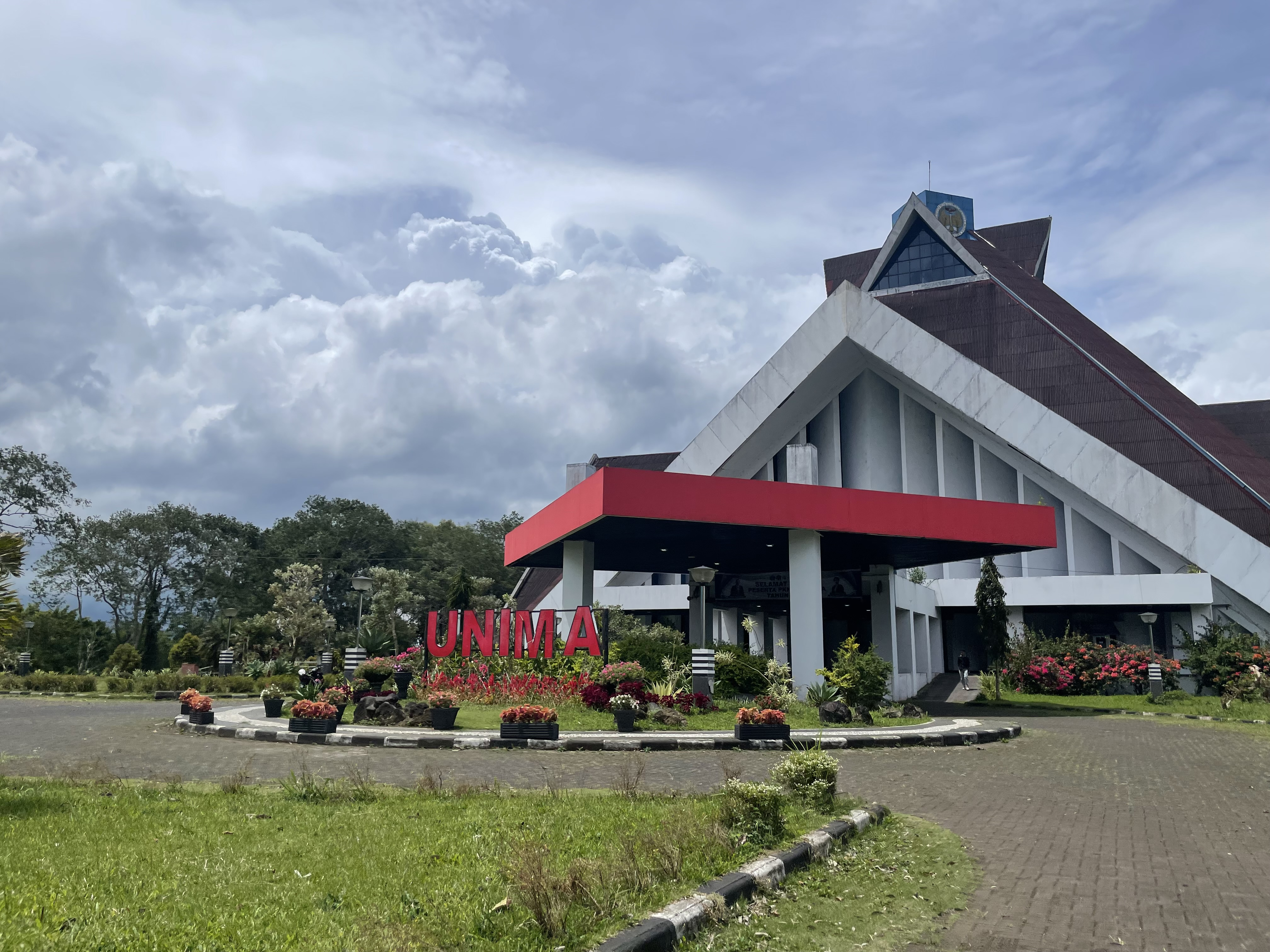
Auditorium building

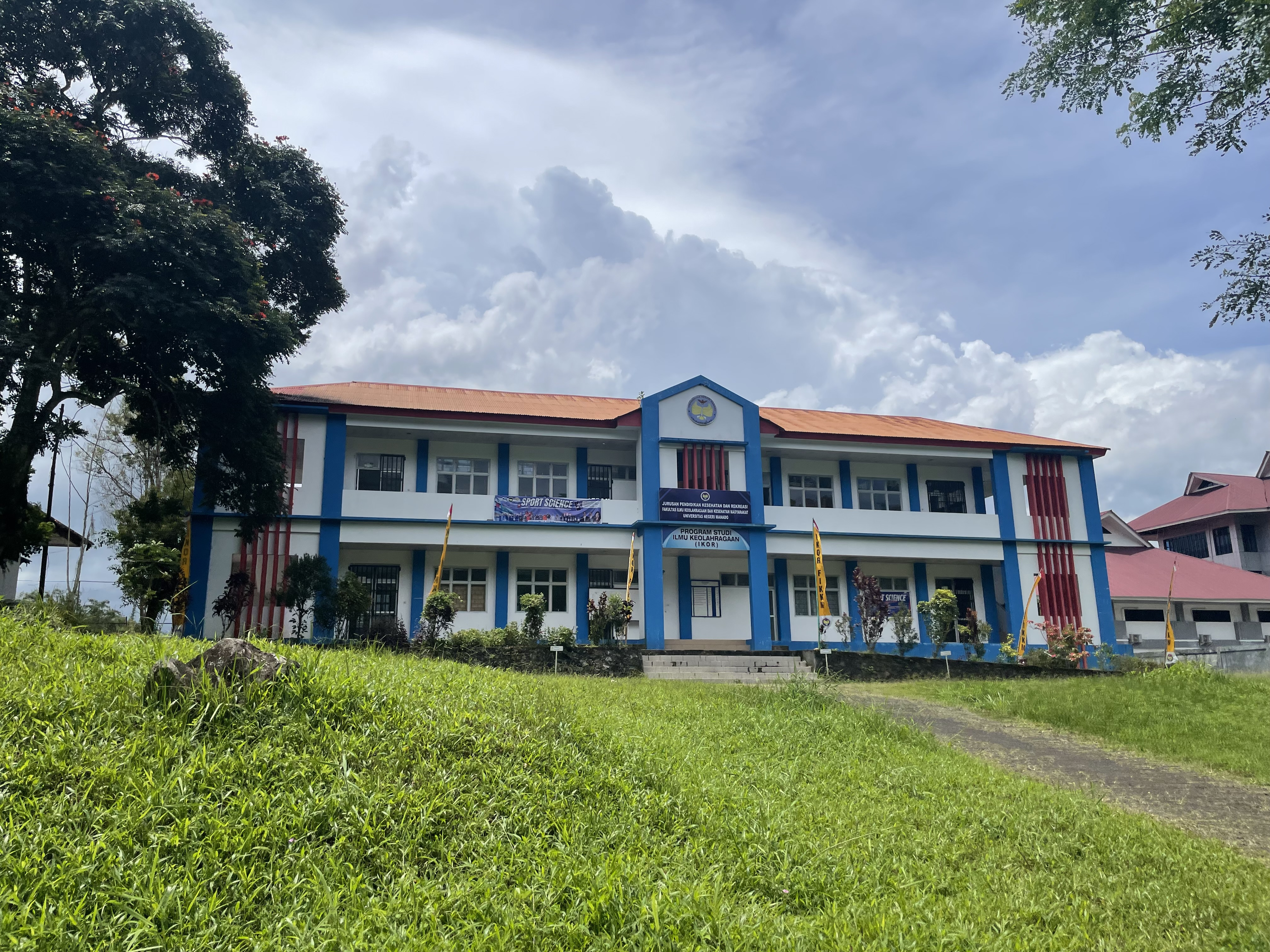
Faculty of Sports Science and Public Health building

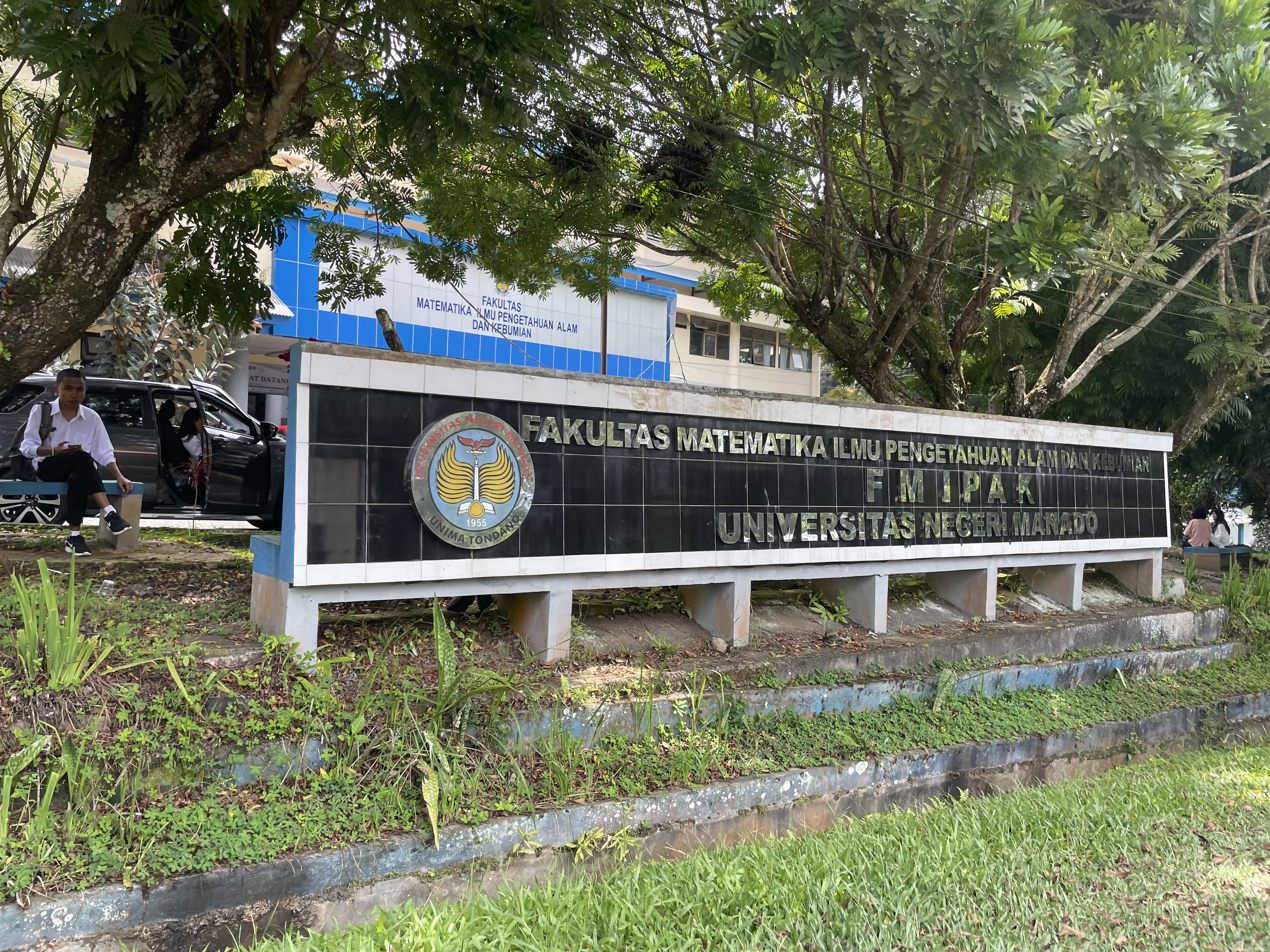
Faculty of Mathematics, Natural Sciences, and Earth Sciences building

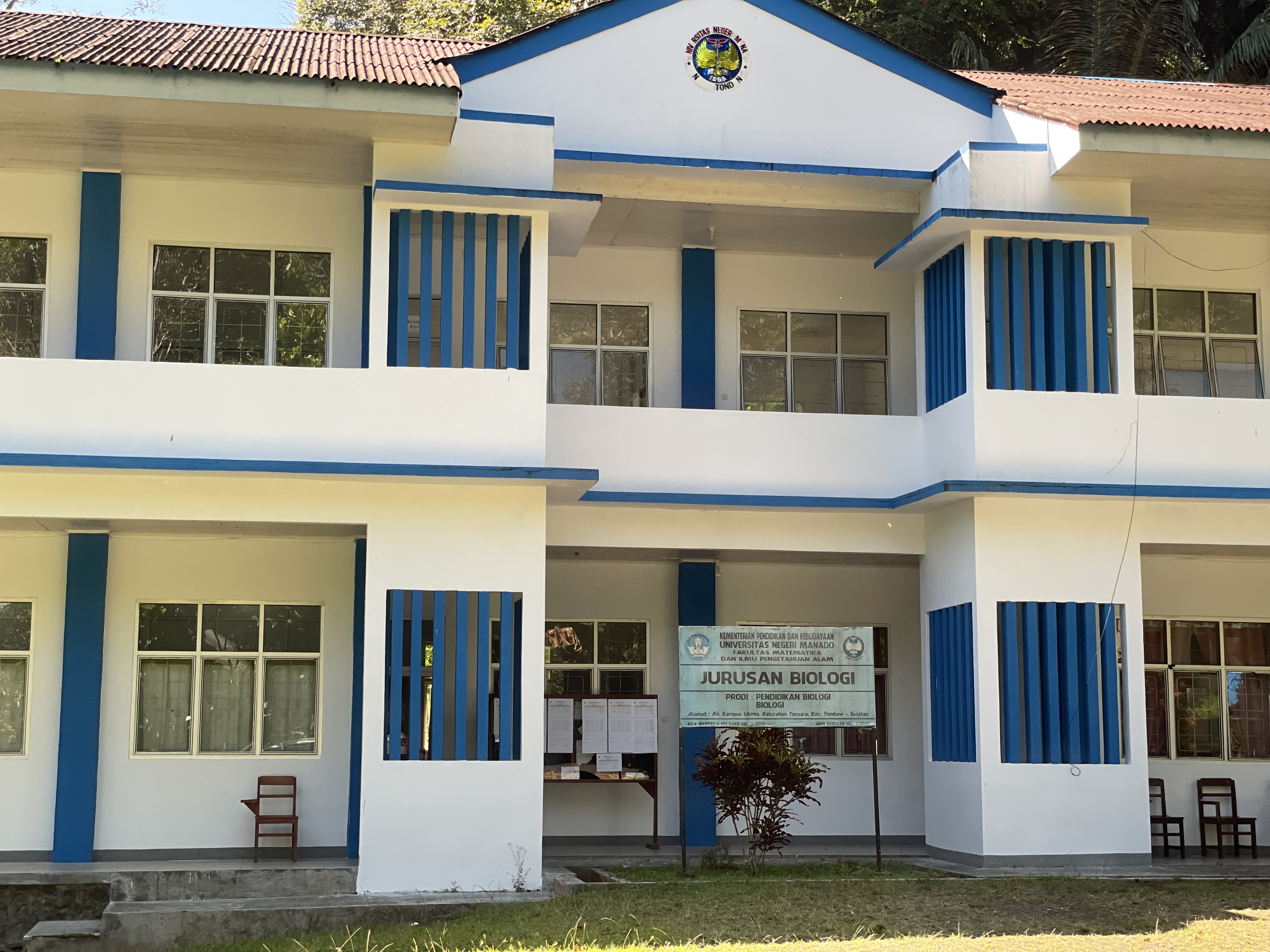
Faculty of Biology building

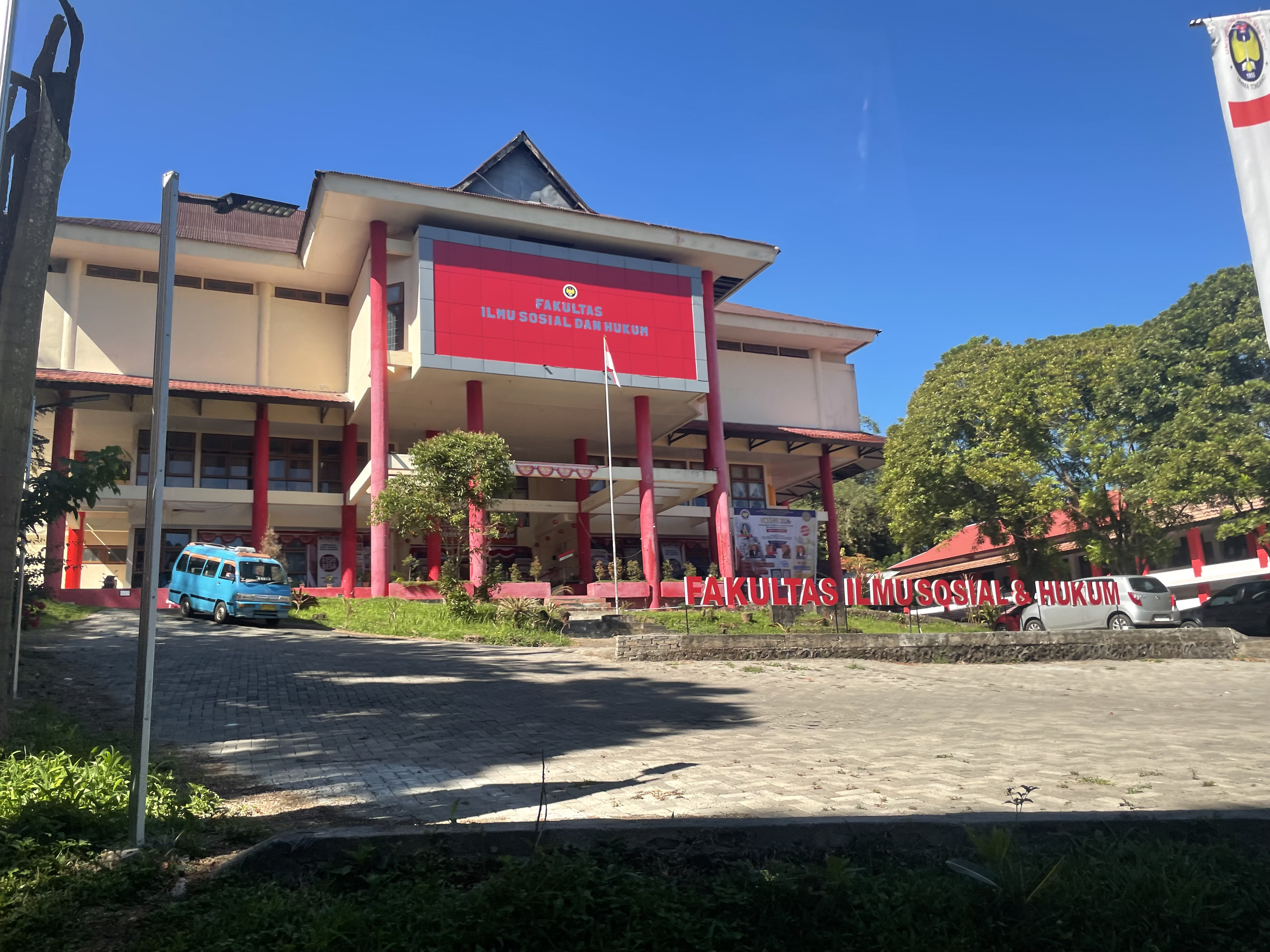
Faculty of Social and Law building
