= Tugiyo =

Indonesian footballer (born 1977)

Personal information
- Full name: Tugiyo
- Date of birth: 13 April 1977 (age 49)
- Place of birth: Purwodadi, Indonesia
- Height: 1.62 m (5 ft 4 in)
- Position: Forward

Youth career
- 1991–1992: Persipur Purwodadi
- 1992–1994: Diklat Salatiga
- 1994–1997: Diklat Ragunan

Senior career*
Years	Team	Apps	(Gls)
1997–1998	PSB Bogor		
1999–2003	PSIS Semarang		
2004	Persipur Purwodadi		
2005–2006	Persik Kendal		
2007	Persip Pekalongan		
2008	Pesik Kuningan		
- * Club domestic league appearances and goals

Tugiyo (born 13 April 1977) is a retired Indonesian football player. Tugiyo was born at Purwodadi, Central Java. Tugiyo was called "Maradona from Purwodadi" because he was a pacy striker and has sturdy, plump body like Diego Maradona.

== Honours ==
=== Club ===
PSIS Semarang

- Liga Indonesia Premier Division: 1998–99
- Liga Indonesia First Division: 2001

=== National ===
- Champions of Asian Students Cup with Indonesia U-16 National Team
