= PS Klabat Jaya Sakti =

PS Klabat XIII Jaya Sakti
- Full name: Persatuan Sepakbola Klabat XIII Jaya Sakti
- Nickname: Prajurit Lapangan Hijau
- Founded: 2017; 9 years ago
- Ground: Klabat Stadium; Manado, North Sulawesi
- Capacity: 15.000
- Owner: Kodam XIII/Merdeka
- Coach: Mohamad Feranudin
- League: Liga 4
- 2024–25: 1st of 5 (Champions); First round, 3rd in Group F (National phase)
Home colours	Away colours

Persatuan Sepakbola Klabat XIII Jaya Sakti, commonly known as PS Klabat Jaya Sakti, is the Indonesian football club based in Manado, North Sulawesi. They currently compete in the Liga 4 North Sulawesi zone.

== Honours ==
- Liga 4 North Sulawesi
  - Champions (1): 2024–25
