= Marthen Tao =

Indonesian footballer

Personal information
- Full name: Marthen Tao
- Date of birth: 4 March 1979 (age 47)
- Place of birth: Sorong, Indonesia
- Height: 1.70 m (5 ft 7 in)
- Position: Striker

Team information
- Current team: Persmin Minahasa (head coach)

Senior career*
| Years | Team | Apps | (Gls) |
| 1999−2003 | PKT Bontang | | (37) |
| 2004−2006 | Arema Malang | | (12) |
| 2007 | Persmin Minahasa | 6 | (0) |
| 2008 | PSIS Semarang | 13 | (1) |
| 2008−2012 | Persiram Raja Ampat | 53 | (12) |

Managerial career
- 2021–2022: Persikos Sorong
- 2023–2024: PS Kasuari
- 2026–: Persmin Minahasa
- * Club domestic league appearances and goals

Marthen Tao (born 4 March 1979) is an Indonesian football manager and former footballer who plays as a striker.

== Honours ==
PKT Bontang

- Liga Indonesia Premier Division runner up: 1999–2000

Arema Malang

- Liga Indonesia First Division: 2004
- Copa Indonesia: 2005, 2006
