= Tondano =

Capital of Minahasa Regency, Indonesia

Coordinates: 1°18′17″N 124°54′43″E

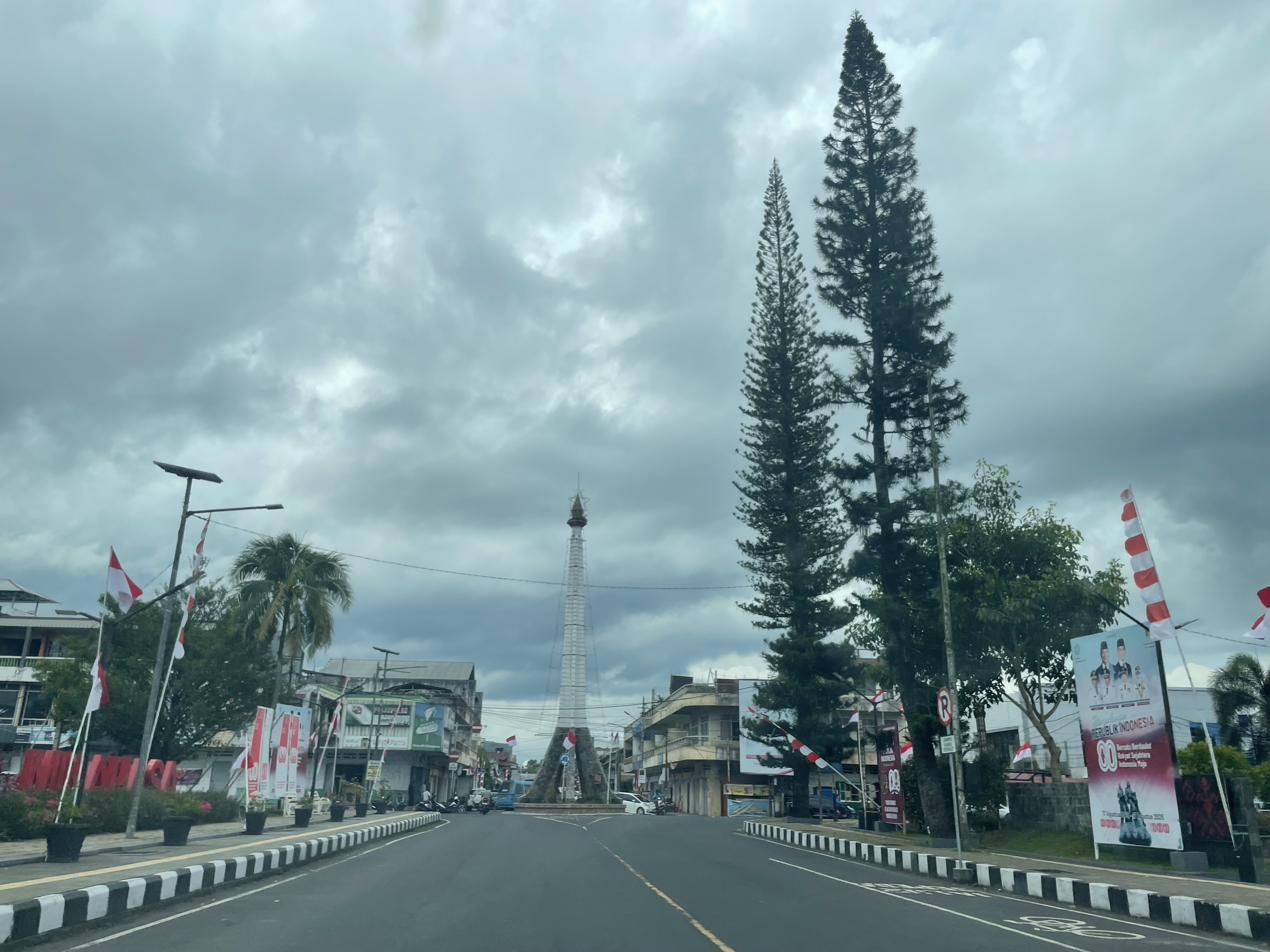
Center of the town of Tondano

Tondano is the capital of Minahasa Regency, mainly in the district of West Tondano (Kecamatan Tondano Barat), in the Indonesian province of North Sulawesi. The town is located in the highlands on the shores of Lake Tondano near Mount Tondano, and enjoys cool temperatures. The city can be reached from Manado around 35 km to the south via Tomohon, through an eastern route via Kecamatan Tombulu, or through north-east via Airmadidi (the capital of North Minahasa Regency).

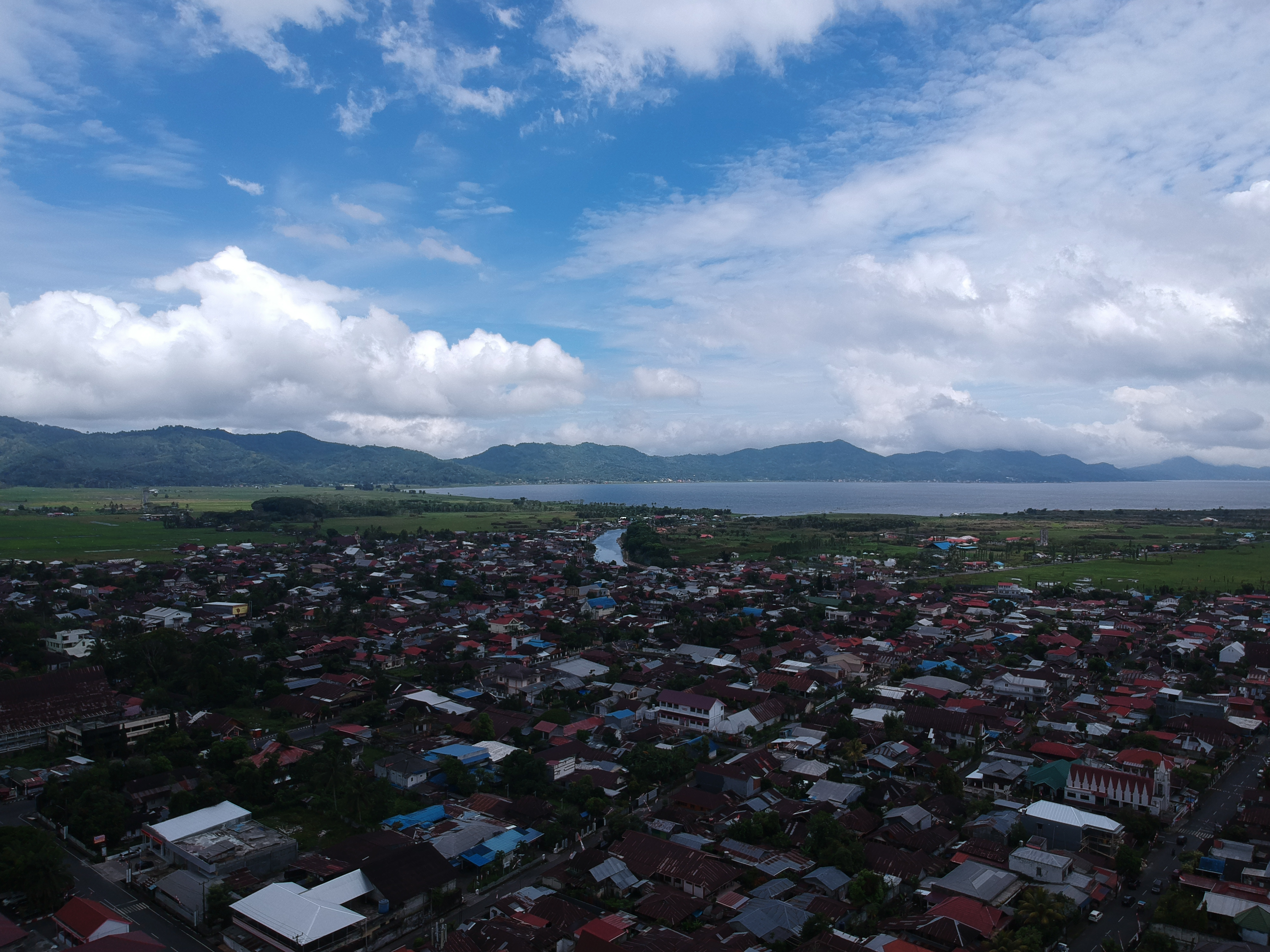
Town of Tondano

In Tondano there is a Manado State University (UNIMA) campus in Tonsaru area, South Tondano. Tondano was the birthplace of Indonesian national hero Doctor Sam Ratulangi, that also the first governor of Sulawesi.

Tha name "tondano" in the Minahasa language is called toulour, which means "water people" (tou means "people," lour means body of water).

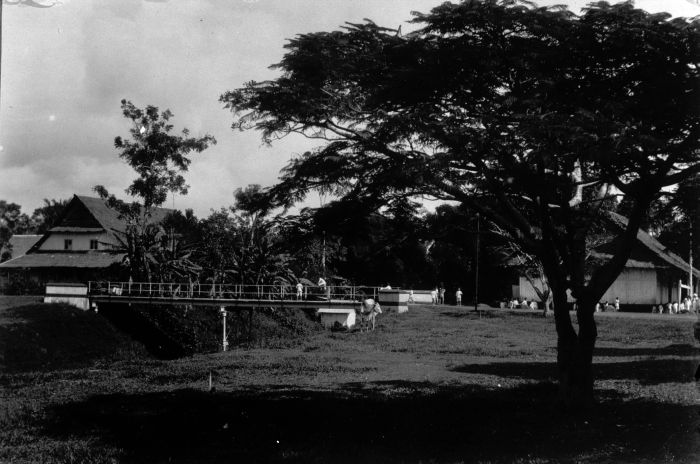
Tondano in 1900–1920

The largest lake in this province located here named after the town, Lake Tondano.

== Climate ==
Tondano has an elevation moderated tropical rainforest climate (Af) with moderate rainfall from July to September and heavy rainfall in the remaining months.

Climate data for Tondano
Month	Jan	Feb	Mar	Apr	May	Jun	Jul	Aug	Sep	Oct	Nov	Dec	Year
Mean daily maximum °C (°F)	26.1 (79.0)	26.2 (79.2)	26.4 (79.5)	27.0 (80.6)	27.0 (80.6)	26.9 (80.4)	26.8 (80.2)	27.2 (81.0)	27.6 (81.7)	27.9 (82.2)	27.4 (81.3)	26.4 (79.5)	26.9 (80.4)
Daily mean °C (°F)	22.2 (72.0)	22.3 (72.1)	22.5 (72.5)	22.7 (72.9)	23.0 (73.4)	22.9 (73.2)	22.7 (72.9)	22.8 (73.0)	22.8 (73.0)	23.0 (73.4)	23.0 (73.4)	22.4 (72.3)	22.7 (72.8)
Mean daily minimum °C (°F)	18.3 (64.9)	18.4 (65.1)	18.7 (65.7)	18.5 (65.3)	19.1 (66.4)	18.9 (66.0)	18.7 (65.7)	18.5 (65.3)	18.1 (64.6)	18.2 (64.8)	18.6 (65.5)	18.5 (65.3)	18.5 (65.4)
Average rainfall mm (inches)	231 (9.1)	184 (7.2)	189 (7.4)	225 (8.9)	235 (9.3)	175 (6.9)	115 (4.5)	85 (3.3)	109 (4.3)	161 (6.3)	230 (9.1)	222 (8.7)	2,161 (85)
Source: Climate-Data.org
