= Southeast Minahasa Regency =

Regency in North Sulawesi, Indonesia

Southeast Minahasa Regency Kabupaten Minahasa Tenggara
- Regency
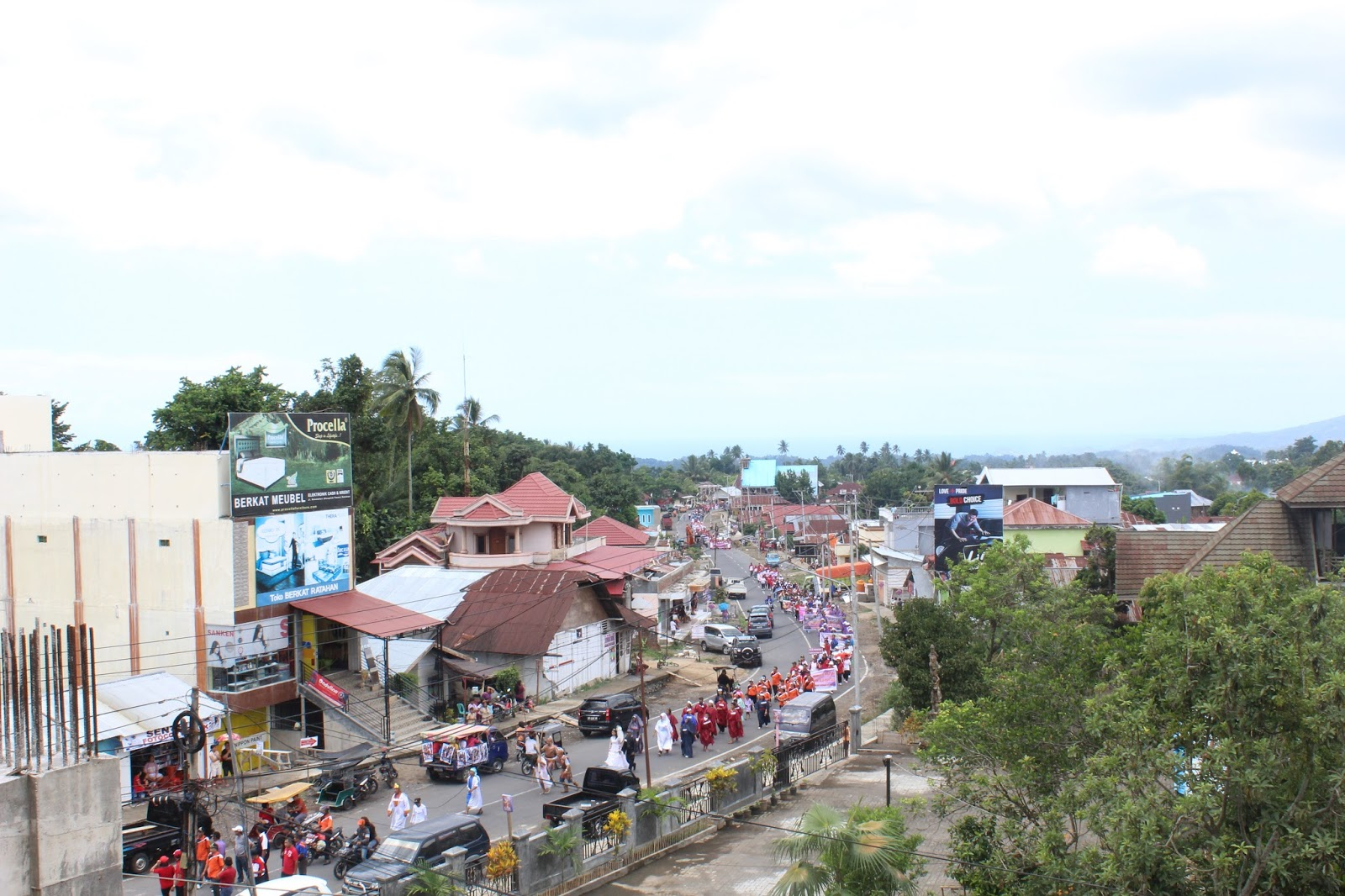
- Ratahan District in Southeast Minahasa Regency

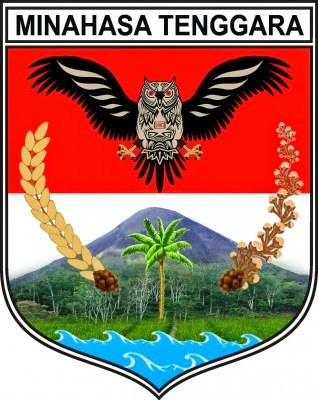
- Coat of arms

- Location in North Sulawesi

- Location in Indonesia
- Coordinates: 1°2′5″N 124°48′36″E
- Country: Indonesia
- Province: North Sulawesi
- Established: 2 January 2007; 19 years ago
- Inaugurated: 23 May 2007; 19 years ago
- Capital: Ratahan

Government
  - Regent: Ronald Kandoli
  - Vice Regent: Fredy Tuda

Area
  - Total: 730.63 km^{2} (282.10 sq mi)

Population (mid 2025 estimate)
  - Total: 122,954
  - Density: 168.28/km^{2} (435.86/sq mi)
- Time zone: UTC+8 (WITA)
- Website: mitrakab.go.id

Southeast Minahasa Regency is a regency in North Sulawesi, Indonesia. It covers a land area of 730.63 km^{2}, and had a population of 100,443 at the 2010 Census; this had risen to 116,323 at the 2020 Census, and the official estimate as at mid 2025 was 122,954 (comprising 63,648 males and 59,306 females). It was established as a separate regency from the south-eastern part of the South Minahasa Regency on 2 January 2007. Its administrative centre is at the town of Ratahan (Ratahan is also a language spoken in the Regency).

== Administrative districts ==
The regency is divided into twelve districts (kecamatan), tabulated below with their areas and their populations at the 2010 Census and the 2020 Census, together with the official estimates as at mid 2025. The table also includes the locations of the district administrative centres, the number of villages in each district (totaling 135 rural desa and 9 urban kelurahan - the latter all in Ratahan District), and its post codes.

| Kode Wilayah | Name of District (kecamatan) | Area in km^{2} | Pop'n Census 2010 | Pop'n Census 2020 | Pop'n Estimate mid 2025 | Admin centre | No. of villages | Post code |
|---|---|---|---|---|---|---|---|---|
| 71.07.04 | Ratatotok ^{(a)} | 104.18 | 12,117 | 14,227 | 15,381 | Ratatotok | 15 | 95999 |
| 71.07.02 | Pusomaen ^{(b)} | 53.63 | 8,219 | 9,583 | 10,138 | Tetengesan | 15 | 95997 |
| 71.07.03 | Belang ^{(c)} | 75.17 | 15,224 | 17,286 | 18,108 | Belang | 20 | 95992 |
| 71.07.01 | Ratahan | 61.63 | 12,164 | 13,721 | 14,121 | Tosuraya | 11 ^{(d)} | 95994 |
| 71.07.11 | Pasan | 49.79 | 6,594 | 7,570 | 7,874 | Liwutung | 11 | 95993 |
| 71.07.12 | Ratahan Timur (East Ratahan) | 63.99 | 5,548 | 6,174 | 6,225 | Wioy | 10 | 95995 |
| 71.07.05 | Tombatu | 67.95 | 9,008 | 10,151 | 10,649 | Betelen | 11 | 95996 |
| 71.07.09 | Tombatu Timur (East Tombatu) | 18.81 | 8,442 | 9,795 | 10,150 | Molompar Dua | 11 | 95990 |
| 71.07.10 | Tombatu Utara (North Tombatu) | 37.17 | 7,674 | 8,992 | 9,693 | Tombatu Dua | 10 | 95991 |
| 71.07.06 | Touluaan | 101.80 | 6,217 | 7,419 | 8,161 | Ranoketang Atas | 10 | 95981 |
| 71.07.07 | Touluaan Selatan (South Touluaan) | 52.76 | 4,079 | 4,878 | 5,262 | Kalait | 10 | 95982 |
| 71.07.08 | Silian Raya | 43.75 | 5,157 | 6,527 | 7,192 | Silian Dua | 10 | 95998 |
| | Totals | 730.63 | 100,443 | 116,323 | 122,954 | Ratahan | 144 | |

Notes: (a) including 10 offshore islands. (b) including 9 offshore islands. (c) including 5 offshore islands.
(d) comprises 9 kelurahan (Lowu Dua, Lowu Satu, Lowu Utara, Nataan, Tosuraya, Tosuraya Barat, Tosuraya Selatan, Wawali and Wawali Pasan) and 2 desa.

== Climate ==
Ratahan, the seat of the regency has a tropical rainforest climate (Af) moderate rainfall in August and September and heavy rainfall in the remaining months.

Climate data for Ratahan
| Month | Jan | Feb | Mar | Apr | May | Jun | Jul | Aug | Sep | Oct | Nov | Dec | Year |
|---|---|---|---|---|---|---|---|---|---|---|---|---|---|
| Mean daily maximum °C (°F) | 27.9 (82.2) | 28.0 (82.4) | 28.2 (82.8) | 29.0 (84.2) | 29.1 (84.4) | 29.0 (84.2) | 28.9 (84.0) | 29.4 (84.9) | 29.8 (85.6) | 29.9 (85.8) | 29.3 (84.7) | 28.4 (83.1) | 28.9 (84.0) |
| Daily mean °C (°F) | 24.2 (75.6) | 24.3 (75.7) | 24.5 (76.1) | 24.8 (76.6) | 25.1 (77.2) | 24.9 (76.8) | 24.8 (76.6) | 24.9 (76.8) | 25.0 (77.0) | 25.0 (77.0) | 25.0 (77.0) | 24.6 (76.3) | 24.8 (76.6) |
| Mean daily minimum °C (°F) | 20.5 (68.9) | 20.6 (69.1) | 20.8 (69.4) | 20.7 (69.3) | 21.1 (70.0) | 20.9 (69.6) | 20.7 (69.3) | 20.5 (68.9) | 20.2 (68.4) | 20.2 (68.4) | 20.7 (69.3) | 20.8 (69.4) | 20.6 (69.2) |
| Average rainfall mm (inches) | 275 (10.8) | 222 (8.7) | 215 (8.5) | 228 (9.0) | 222 (8.7) | 180 (7.1) | 134 (5.3) | 96 (3.8) | 105 (4.1) | 147 (5.8) | 227 (8.9) | 243 (9.6) | 2,294 (90.3) |
Source: Climate-Data.org
