= South Minahasa Regency =

Regency in North Sulawesi, Indonesia

South Minahasa Regency (Kabupaten Minahasa Selatan)
- Regency
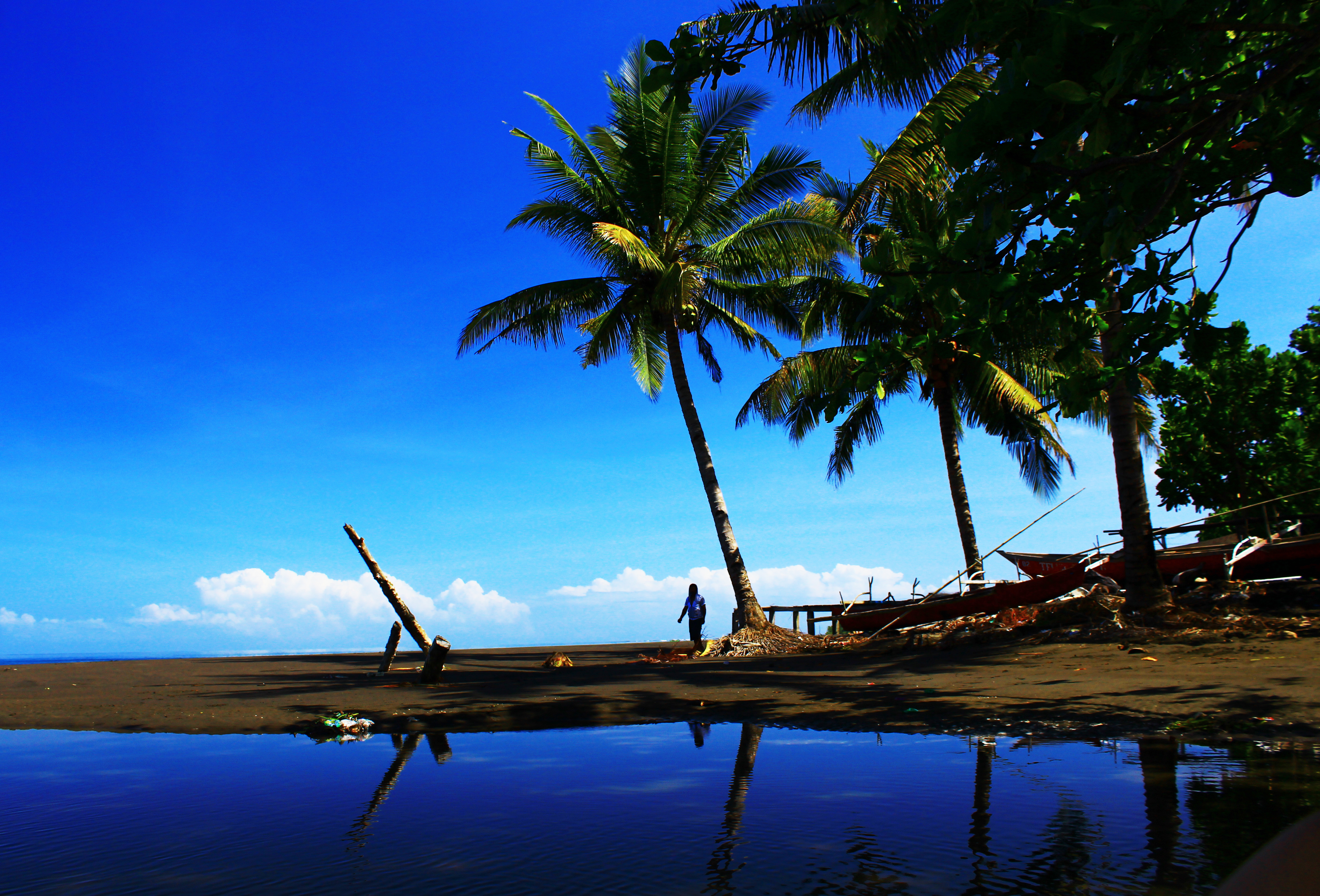
- Poigar Beach in Poigar Village, Sinonsayang District, South Minahasa Regency

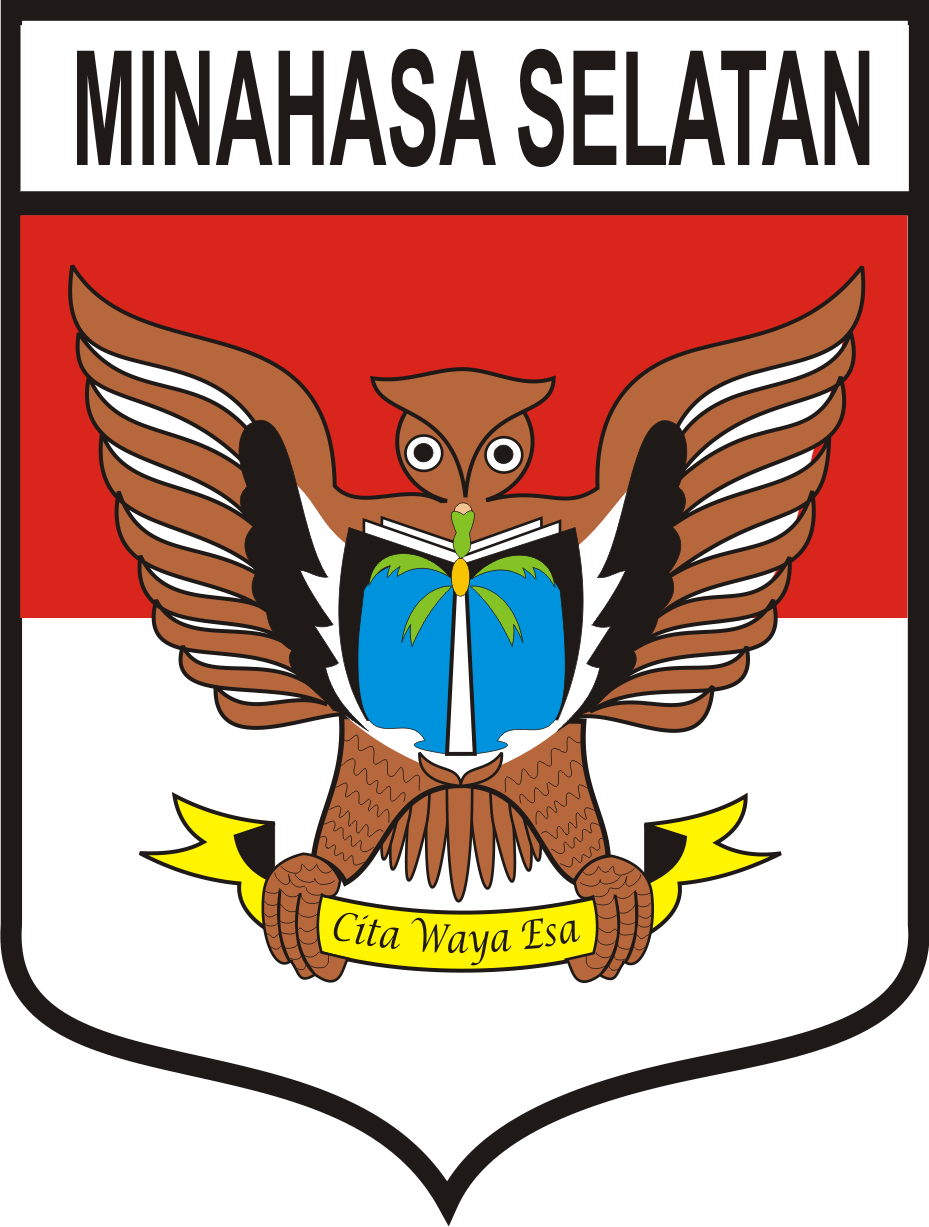
- Coat of arms
- Motto: Cita Waya Esa (We Are All One)
- Location in North Sulawesi

- Location in Indonesia
- Coordinates: 0°35′N 124°18′E
- Country: Indonesia
- Province: North Sulawesi
- Established: 25 February 2003; 23 years ago
- Capital: Amurang

Government
  - Regent: Franky Donny Wongkar
  - Vice Regent: Theodorus Kawatu

Area
  - Total: 1,456.74 km^{2} (562.45 sq mi)

Population (mid 2025 estimate)
  - Total: 243,519
  - Density: 167.167/km^{2} (432.961/sq mi)
- Time zone: UTC+8 (WITA)
- Website: minselkab.go.id

South Minahasa Regency is a regency in North Sulawesi, Indonesia. Its capital is the town of Amurang. It was originally part of the Minahasa Regency until it was established as a separate regency on 25 February 2003. In turn, nearly four years later, a new Southeast Minahasa Regency was established as a separate regency from part of the South Minahasa Regency on 2 January 2007. The residual Regency now covers an area of 1,456.74 km^{2}, and had a population of 195,553 at the 2010 Census; this had risen to 236,463 at the 2020 Census; the official estimate as at mid 2025 was 243,519.

== Administration ==
The regency is divided into seventeen districts (kecamatan), tabulated below with their areas and population totals from the 2010 Census and the 2020 Census, together with the official estimates as at mid 2025. The table also includes the locations of the administrative centres, the number of administrative villages in each district (totaling 163 rural desa and 14 urban kelurahan), and its postal codes.

Kode Wilayah	Name of District (kecamatan)	Area in km^{2}	Pop'n Census 2010	Pop'n Census 2020	Pop'n Estimate mid 2025	Admin centre	No. of villages	Post codes
71.05.01	Modoinding	53.37	11,324	13,748	14,413	Pinasungkulan	10	95958
71.05.02	Tompaso Baru	105.41	11,774	13,511	14,408	Tompaso Baru Dua	10	95358
71.05.16	Maesaan	140.03	9,717	12,020	12,196	Tumani Utara	12	95357
71.05.03	Ranoyapo	93.68	11,832	14,361	14,533	Pontak Satu	12	95944
21.05.07	Motoling	23.88	7,191	8,650	8,780	Motoling	7 ^{(a)}	95941
21.05.15	Kumelembuai	45.42	6,650	7,847	7,786	Kumelembuai Satu	8	95956
71.05.21	Motoling Barat (West Motoling)	110.90	7,661	9,655	10,088	Raanon Baru Dua	8	95942
71.05.22	Motoling Timur (East Motoling)	68.25	8,673	10,277	10,802	Wanga Amongena	8	95943
71.05.08	Sinonsayang	133.31	15,203	18,860	19,427	Ongkaw Dua	13	95959
71.05.09	Tenga	122.98	17,184	21,522	22,248	Pakuweru	18	95355
71.05.10	Amurang	66.37	16,260	18,182	18,379	Buyungon	8 ^{(b)}	95957
71.05.17	Amurang Barat (West Amurang)	87.63	14,898	17,307	18,227	Kapitu	10 ^{(c)}	95955
71.05.18	Amurang Timur (East Amurang)	113.36	13,390	16,455	16,737	Lopana	10 ^{(d)}	95954
71.05.13	Tareran	65.77	12,129	14,234	13,873	Rumoong Atas	13	95953
71.05.23	Suluun Tareran ("Sulta")	40.54	7,098	8,169	8,778	Suluun Empat	9	95952
71.05.12	Tumpaan	73.33	15,434	20,095	20,582	Tumpaan Satu	10	95352
71.05.19	Tatapaan ^{(e)}	111.52	8,965	11,570	12,262	Paslaten	11	95351
	Totals	1,456.74	195,553	236,463	243,519	Amurang	177	

Notes: (a) comprises 4 kelurahan (Motoling, Motoling Dua, Motoling Mawale and Motoling Satu) and 3 desa.
(b) comprises 6 kelurahan (Bitung, Buyungon, Lewet, Ranoyapo, Uwuran I and Uwuran II) and 2 desa.
(c) comprises 2 kelurahan (Kawangkoan Bawah and Rumoong Bawah) and 8 desa.
(d) comprises 2 kelurahan (Pondang and Ranomea) and 8 desa. (e) including 4 small offshore islands.

== Climate ==
Amurang, the seat of the regency has a tropical rainforest climate (Af) with moderate rainfall from July to September and heavy rainfall in the remaining months.

Climate data for Amurang
Month	Jan	Feb	Mar	Apr	May	Jun	Jul	Aug	Sep	Oct	Nov	Dec	Year
Mean daily maximum °C (°F)	29.6 (85.3)	29.6 (85.3)	29.9 (85.8)	30.9 (87.6)	31.0 (87.8)	30.9 (87.6)	30.9 (87.6)	31.5 (88.7)	31.7 (89.1)	31.8 (89.2)	30.9 (87.6)	30.2 (86.4)	30.7 (87.3)
Daily mean °C (°F)	26.0 (78.8)	26.0 (78.8)	26.2 (79.2)	26.7 (80.1)	26.9 (80.4)	26.8 (80.2)	26.7 (80.1)	26.9 (80.4)	26.8 (80.2)	27.0 (80.6)	26.7 (80.1)	26.4 (79.5)	26.6 (79.9)
Mean daily minimum °C (°F)	22.4 (72.3)	22.4 (72.3)	22.6 (72.7)	22.5 (72.5)	22.9 (73.2)	22.7 (72.9)	22.5 (72.5)	22.4 (72.3)	22.0 (71.6)	22.2 (72.0)	22.6 (72.7)	22.7 (72.9)	22.5 (72.5)
Average rainfall mm (inches)	331 (13.0)	263 (10.4)	243 (9.6)	205 (8.1)	187 (7.4)	170 (6.7)	124 (4.9)	97 (3.8)	99 (3.9)	138 (5.4)	224 (8.8)	280 (11.0)	2,361 (93)
Source: Climate-Data.org
