= Bolsel F.C. =

Association football team in Indonesia

Bolsel
- Full name: Bolaang Mongondow Selatan Football Club
- Nicknames: Laskar Maleo (Maleo Warriors)
- Short name: Bolsel
- Founded: 2007; 19 years ago
- Ground: Molibagu Field; South Bolaang Mongondow, North Sulawesi
- Capacity: 500
- Owner: Askab PSSI South Bolaang Mongondow
- Chairman: Zulkarnain Kamaru
- Manager: Wahyudin Kadullah
- Coach: Sumitro Paldiko
- League: Liga 4
- 2021: 4th, (North Sulawesi zone)
Home colours	Away colours

Bolaang Mongondow Selatan Football Club (simply known as Bolsel FC) is an Indonesian football club based in South Bolaang Mongondow, North Sulawesi. They currently compete in the Liga 4.
