= Minahasa Regency =

Regency in North Sulawesi, Indonesia

Minahasa Regency Kabupaten Minahasa
- Regency
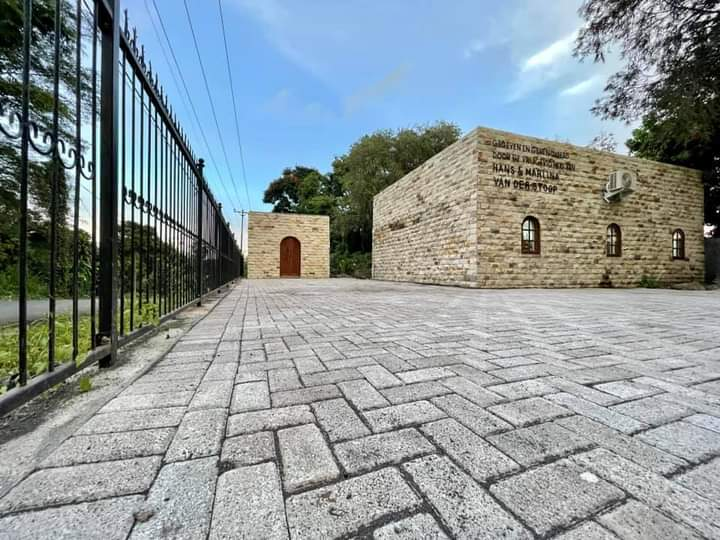
- Sha'ar Hashamayim Synagogue

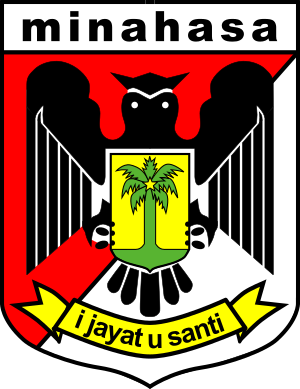
- Coat of arms
- Motto: I Jayat U Santi
- Location in North Sulawesi

- Location in Indonesia
- Coordinates: 1°1′N 124°34′E
- Country: Indonesia
- Province: North Sulawesi
- Established: 5 November 1428; 597 years ago
- Capital: Tondano

Government
  - Regent: Robby Dondokambey
  - Vice Regent: Vanda Sarundajang

Area
  - Total: 1,141.64 km^{2} (440.79 sq mi)

Population (mid 2025 estimate)
  - Total: 333,316
  - Density: 291.962/km^{2} (756.179/sq mi)
- Time zone: UTC+8 (WITA)
- Website: minahasa.go.id

Minahasa Regency is a regency in North Sulawesi, Indonesia. Its capital is Tondano. It covers an area of 1,141.64 km^{2} and had a population of 310,384 at the 2010 Census; this rose to 347,290 at the 2020 Census, and the official estimate as at mid 2025 was 333,316 (comprising 169,720 males and 163,596 females).

Several cities and regencies representing areas that were initially part of the Minahasa Regency have since been removed from this regency and established as the cities of Bitung (initially made an administrative city in 1975, and then raised to a fully independent city on 15 August 1990) and Tomohon (25 February 2003), and the regencies of South Minahasa (also on 25 February 2003), North Minahasa (on 18 December 2003), and Southeast Minahasa (on 2 January 2007, through the South Minahasa Regency).

== History ==
In 1983, Minahasa Regency government declared 5 November 1428 as the anniversary of the regency. This date is purely symbolic, because the day and month were taken from the day and month of Sam Ratulangi's birth date, Ratulangi being one of the most prominent historical figures from Minahasa. The year 1428 symbolizes the estimated year of the meeting of the Minahasan tribes who came together in their resistance to the neighboring Bolaang Mongondow Kingdom. Because it is only an approximation, the numbers of the year 1428 were taken from two important events, which are Peristiwa Merah Putih (or the Red and White Incident) that occurred in Manado on 14 February 1946, and the Second Youth Congress which produced the Youth Pledge that was held in 1928. The number 14 comes from the day the Red and White Incident occurred, while the number 28 is taken from the year when the Second Youth Congress was held.

The Minahasa region itself was designated as an administrative region as a kabupaten (or regency) in 1965 based on Indonesian Law No. 18/1965. In this law, the administrative regions of the Province of North Sulawesi that were formerly called Daerah Tingkat II (or Level II Region) were now called Kabupaten. Hence, Daerah Tingkat II Minahasa became Kabupaten Minahasa. The existence of the region that includes the current Minahasa Regency as an administrative region can be seen long before the issuance of the 1965 law and before the formation of the Republic of Indonesia.

=== Agreement with VOC ===
In addition to banding together to fight pressure from outside in the 15th century, the tribes in Minahasa also came together in the 17th century to do a similar thing. Several Minahasa tribes joined in a friendship agreement with the Vereenigde Oostindische Compagnie (VOC or the Dutch East Indies Company). The intention was the same, that is to combat attacks from the Bolaang area. This agreement became official on 10 January 1679 during the visit of Robertus Padtbrugge who was the VOC governor based in Maluku at that time. There are 23 chiefs of political and social communities called walak who participated in the agreement. The chiefs came from Aris, Bantik, Kakaskasen, Klabat, Klabat, Klabat Atas, Langowan, Pasan (who also represented Pinosokan and Ratahan), Remboken, Rumoong, Sarongsong, Tombariri, Tombasian, Tomohon, Tompaso, Tondano, Tonkimbut Atas, Tonkimbut, Tonkimbut Below, Tonsawang, and Tonsea.

=== Dutch occupation ===
The area encompassing the current Minahasa Regency has been designated as an official administrative region since the Dutch occupation after the VOC was dissolved when Indonesia was called the Dutch East Indies. At the time, the Residentie Manado (or Residency of Manado) covered all regencies and cities in entire region of Minahasa today, namely the regencies of Minahasa, North Minahasa, South Minahasa, Southeast Minahasa, and the cities of Bitung, Manado, and Tomohon. In 1856, the walak communities in Minahasa were organized into 26 districts. At the end of the 19th century, the number of districts fell to 18, namely Bantik, Kakaskasen, Kakas-Remboken, Kawangkoan, Langowan, Manado, Maumbi, Pasan Ratahan-Pinosakan, Rumoong, Sonder, Tombariri, Tombasian, Tomohon-Sarongsong, Tompaso, Tondano-Touliang, Tondano-Toulimambot, Tonsawang, and Tonsea. Then in 1908, the number dropped to 16, where the Kakaskasen District was abolished and the Rumoong and Tombasian districts were combined. The number of districts were cut down to seven in 1920 with the remaining districts being Amurang, Kawangkoan, Manado, Ratahan, Tomohon, Tonsea, and Toulour. In 1927, Manado and Tomohon were combined so that only six districts remained: Amurang, Kawangkoan, Manado, Ratahan, Tonsea, and Toulour. Arrangements of these districts lasted until the arrival and occupation of Japan. Under these six districts, an administrative region called the onderdistrict (or subdistrict) was designated. There were 16 subdistricts at that time named Airmadidi, Amurang, Eris, Kakas, Kauditan, Kawangkoan, Langowan, South Manado, North Manado, Ratahan, Tatelu, Tenga, Tombariri, Tombatu, Tomohon, Tompaso, Tondano, and Tumpaan.

For administrative region above the district level, the Minahasa region in the Manado Residency was part of the Manado Afdeeling, which was formed in 1911. This administrative region was further divided into three areas: Amurang, Manado, and Tondano. Before the formation of the Manado Afdeeling, there were five onderafdeeling covering the area of Minahasa, namely Amurang, Belang, Kema, Manado and Tondano. In 1926, these onderafdeeling were abolished.

=== Japanese occupation ===
During the years of the Japanese occupation, the organization of administrative regions did not change much. In 1942, the number of districts increased by one where the Toulour District was divided into the districts of Langowan and Tondano. In the same year, the Manado District was divided into the districts of Manado and Tomohon. In 1943, the separation of the city of Manado from the other areas of Minahasa can be seen happening for the first time where the Minahasa region sans Manado were united and given the name Minahasa-ken.

=== Republic of Indonesia ===
After Indonesian independence, the Minahasa region was included in the Province of Sulawesi and the residency based in Manado. Then for a short time, the region was included in the territory of the State of East Indonesia as one of its 13 administrative regions. In 1953, Manado was designated as a municipality with the status of second level region (or Daerah Tingkat II) with the province designated as the first level region. Manado again became separated from the other Minahasa areas. Due to this separation, the capital of the Minahasa region was later changed from Manado to Tondano in 1959.

In 1960, the Province of Sulawesi was divided into the provinces of North Sulawesi and South Sulawesi based on Indonesian Regulation No. 5/1960. The names of these two provinces were changed according to Indonesian Law No. 47/1960, where the Province of North Sulawesi became the Province of North-Central Sulawesi. The region of Minahasa as a second level region was included in this province. Then in 1964, the Province of North-Central Sulawesi was further divided into the provinces of North Sulawesi and Central Sulawesi based on Indonesian Law No. 13/1964. Minahasa as a second level region was included in the province of North Sulawesi. The use of the name of the kabupaten was given based on Indonesian Law No. 18/1965, in which the Daerah Tingkat II Minahasa became Kabupaten Minahasa. Subsequently, based on Indonesian Law No. 5/1974, the name was changed again to Daerah Tingkat II Kabupaten Minahasa. The list of districts under the regency at that time were Airmadidi, Belang, Bitung, Dimembe, Eris, Kakas, Kauditan, Kawangkoan, Kombi, Likupang, Modoinding, Motoling, Pineleng, Ratahan, Remboken, Sonder, Tareran, Tenga, Tombariri, Tombasian, Tombatu, Tomohon, Tompaso, Tompaso Baru, Tondano, Tumpaan, and Wori.

In the following years, the regency underwent several changes with the formation of new administrative regions from within the territory of the regency itself. Based on Indonesian Regulation No. 4/1975, the Bitung Administrative Municipality was inaugurated as an administrative city, and was finally separated on 15 August 1990 from the Minahasa Regency. On 25 February 2003, the Minahasa Regency was divided into three entities, a residual Minahasa Regency, the new South Minahasa Regency, and the new Municipality of Tomohon based on Indonesian Law No. 10/2003. Then on 18 December 2003, the residual Minahasa Regency was further divided into the remaining Minahasa Regency and a new North Minahasa Regency (at first including the area which in 2007 was split off again into a new Southeast Minahasa Regency), based on Indonesian Law No. 33/2005.

== Administrative districts ==
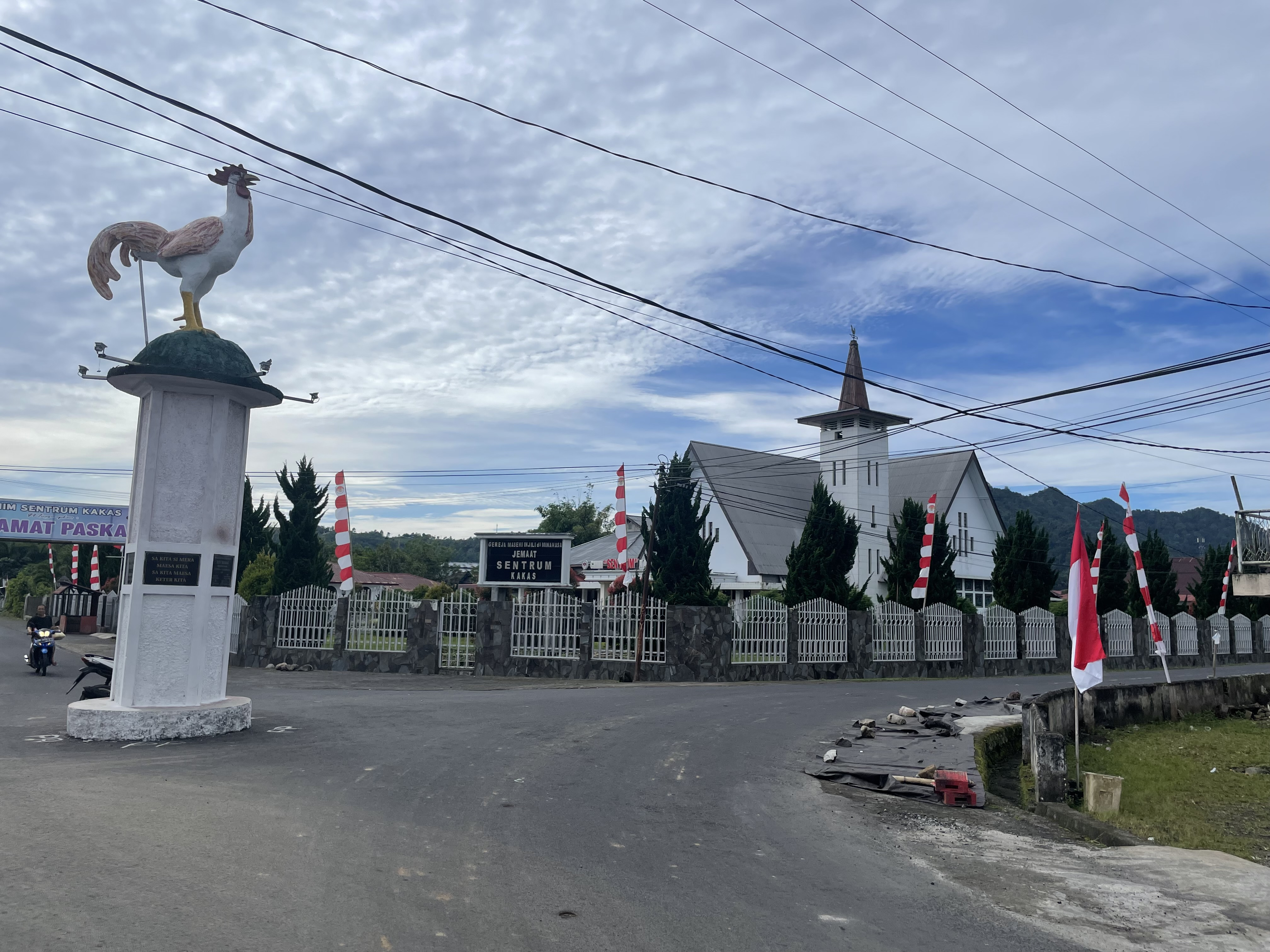
District of Kakas

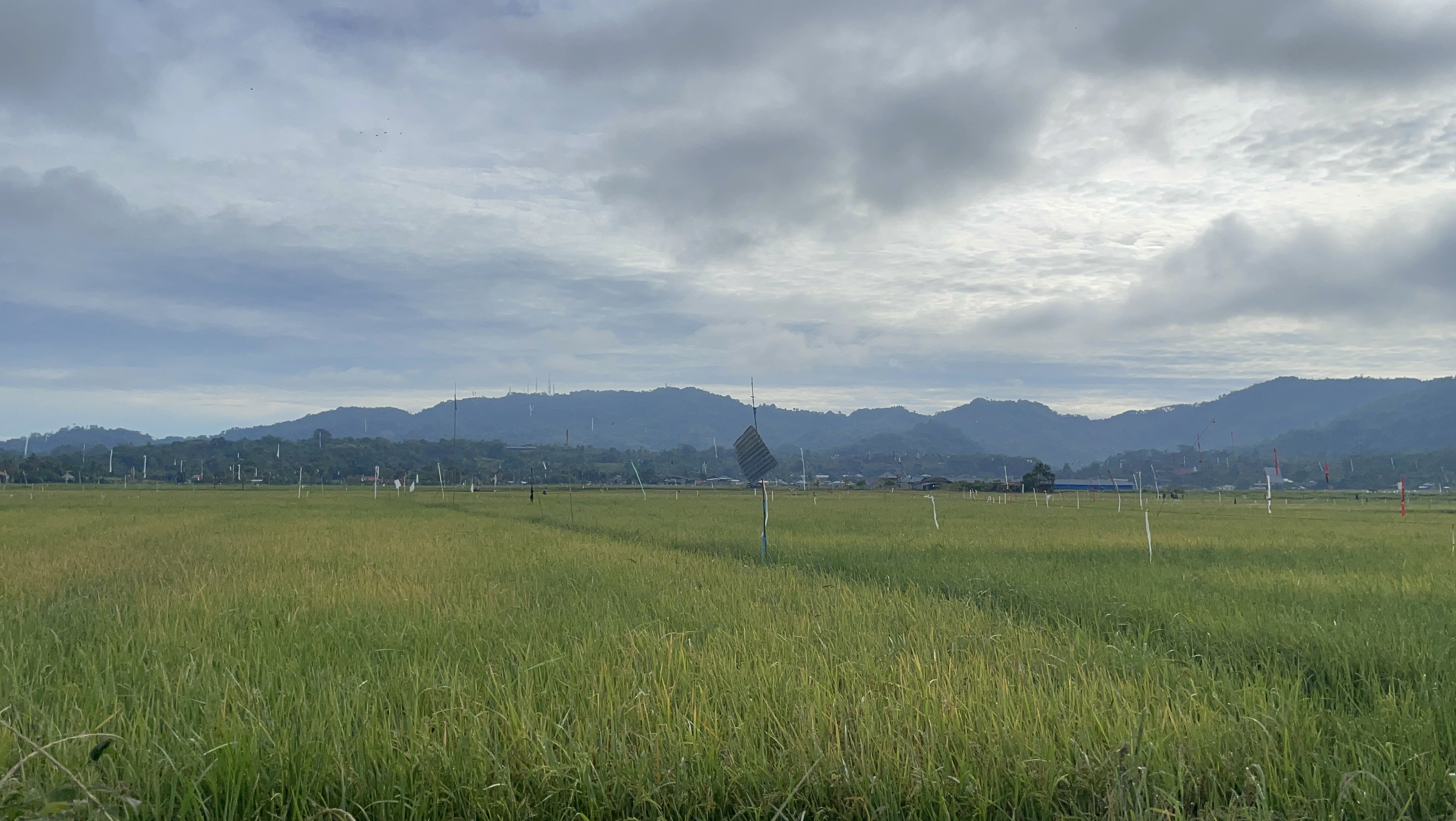
District of East Tondano

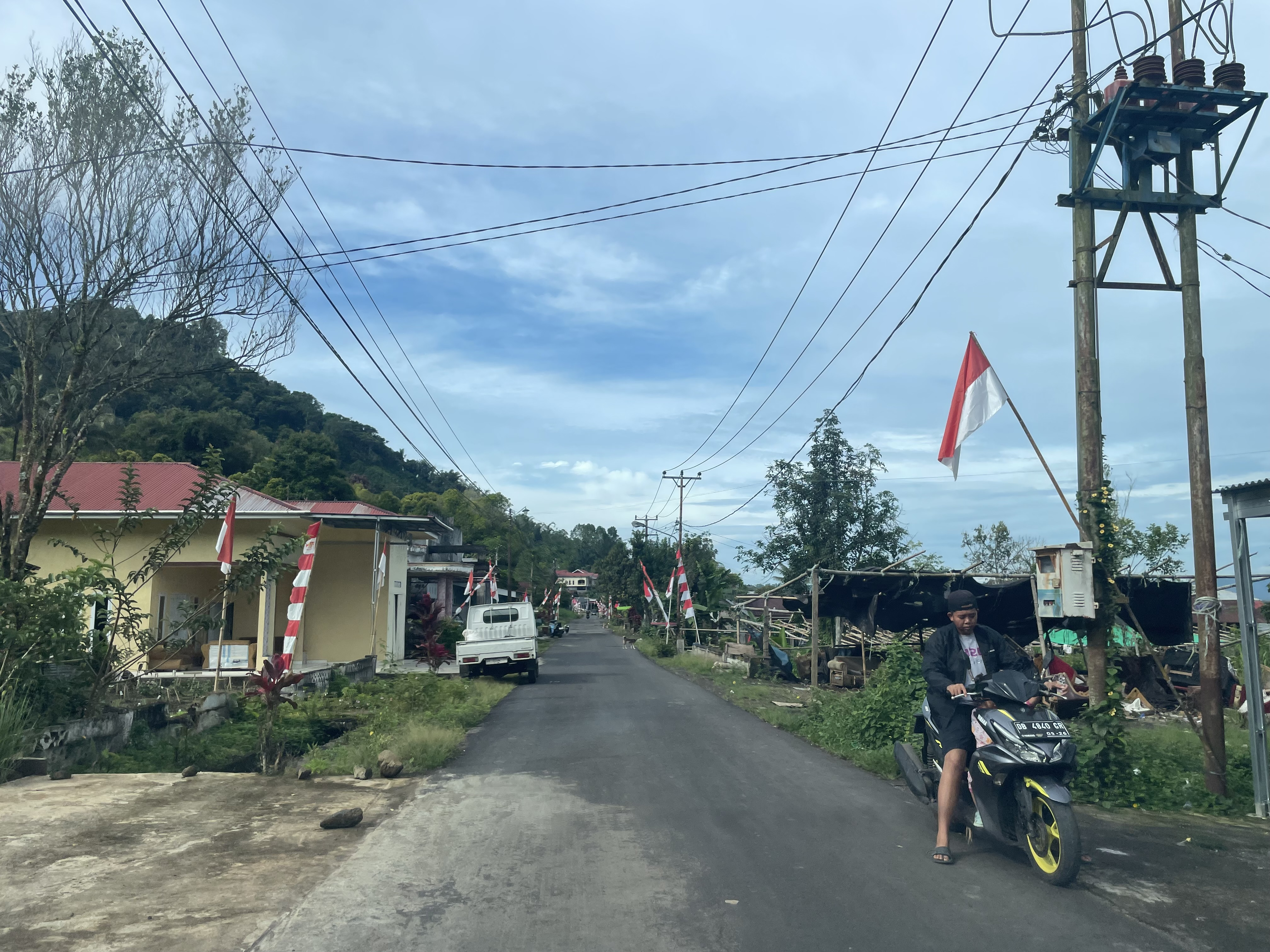
District of Eris

The regency is divided into twenty-five districts (kecamatan), tabulated below with their areas and population totals from the 2010 Census and the 2020 Census, together with the official estimates as at mid 2025. It includes the six new districts of Kakas Barat, Kawangkoan Barat, Kawangkoan Utara, Mandolang, Tombariri Timur, and Tompaso Barat, which were established after 2010. The table also includes the locations of the administrative centres, the number of administrative villages in each district (totaling 227 rural desa and 43 urban kelurahan - the latter including 33 in the 4 Tondano town districts), and its postal codes.

Area Code	Name of District (kecamatan)	English name	Area in km^{2}	Pop'n Census 2010	Pop'n Census 2020	Pop'n Estimate mid 2025	Admin centre	No. of villages	Post codes
71.02.09	Langowan Timur	(East Langowan)	7.24	12,220	13,571	12,882	Waleure	8	95696
71.02.10	Langowan Barat	(West Langowan)	42.69	15,143	16,613	17,017	Raranon	16	95694
71.02.17	Langowan Selatan	(South Langowan)	69.65	7,457	8,094	8,054	Winebetan	10	95695
71.02.19	Langowan Utara	(North Langowan)	8.27	7,990	8,754	8,557	Tempang Dua	8	95697
71.02.07	Tompaso		17.32	15,158	7,447	7,312	Liba	10	95693
71.02.25	Tompaso Barat	(West Tompaso)	14.61	^{(a)}	9,276	9,119	Pinaesaan	10	95698
71.02.12	Kawangkoan		35.99	25,904	10,500	10,171	Sendangan Tengah	10 ^{(b)}	95690
71.02.22	Kawangkoan Barat	(West Kawangkoan)	13.09	^{(c)}	8,721	8,758	Kayuuwi Satu	10	95692
71.02.21	Kawangkoan Utara	(North Kawangkoan)	19.27	^{(c)}	9,037	8,711	Kiawa Dua Timur	10 ^{(d)}	95699
71.02.11	Sonder		52.52	17,503	19,538	19,198	Talikuran	19	95691
71.02.15	Tombariri		56.43	25,651	18,200	17,817	Borgo	10	95651
71.02.24	Tombariri Timur	(East Tombariri)	101.57	^{(e)}	10,404	10,428	Lolah Tiga	10	95652
71.02.13	Pineleng		49.30	45,079	30,306	27,453	Pineleng Dua	14	95662
71.02.14	Tombulu		73.43	15,023	19,310	17,404	Kembes Satu	11	95663
71.02.23	Mandolang		47.05	^{(f)}	21,658	20,434	Tateli Tiga	12	95661
71.02.01	Tondano Barat	(West Tondano)	22.66	18,862	21,558	19,656	Rinegetan	9 ^{(g)}	95616 -95617
71.02.18	Tondano Selatan	(South Tondano)	25.34	19,716	17,906	16,641	Tataaran Patar	8 ^{(h)}	95618 -95619
71.02.02	Tondano Timur	(East Tondano)	33.71	13,772	15,092	15,137	Ranowangko	11 ^{(i)}	95611 -95615
71.02.16	Tondano Utara	(North Tondano)	63.49	11,211	13,030	12,862	Tonsea Lama	8 ^{(j)}	95614 -95615^{(k)}
71.02.08	Remboken		24.07	10,994	12,770	12,384	Talikuran	11	95681
71.02.06	Kakas		88.85	21,211	12,646	12,232	Pahaleten	13	95680
71.02.20	Kakas Barat	(West Kakas)	45.16	^{(l)}	10,974	10,987	Wasian	10	95682
71.02.05	Lembean Timur	(East Lembean)	76.94	7,523	8,459	8,196	Kapataran	11	95685
71.02.03	Eris		33.25	9,932	11,964	11,389	Eris	8	95683
71.02.04	Kombi		119.74	10,035	11,462	10,517	Kombi	13	95684
	Totals		1,141.64	310,384	347,290	333,316		270	

Notes: (a) the 2010 population of the new Tompaso Barat District is included in the 2010 figure for Tompaso District, from which it was split off in 2012.
(b) comprising 6 kelurahan (Kinali, Kinali Satu, Sendangan, Sendangan Selatan, Sendangan Utara and Uner Satu) and 4 desa.
(c) the 2010 populations of the new Kawangkoan Utara and Kawangkoan Barat Districts are included in the 2010 figure for Kawangkoan District, from which they were later split off.
(d) comprising 4 kelurahan (Talikuran, Talikuran Barat, Talikuran Utara and Uner) and 6 desa.
(e) the 2010 population of the new Tombariri Timur District is included in the 2010 figure for Tombariri District, from which it was split off in 2012.
(f) the 2010 population of the new Mandolang District is included in the 2010 figure for Pineleng District, from which it was split off in 2012.
(g) all 9 are kelurahan (Masarang, Rerewokan, Rinegetan, Roong, Tounkuramber, Tuutu, Watulambot, Wawalintouan and Wewelen).
(h) all 8 are kelurahan (Koya, Maesa Unima, Peleloan, Tataaran I, Tataaran II, Tataaran Patar, Tounsaru and Urongo).
(i) all 11 are kelurahan (Katinggolan, Kendis, Kiniar, Liningaan, Luaan, Makalonsouw, Papakelan, Ranowangko, Taler, Toulour and Wengkol).
(j) comprising 5 kelurahan (Kampung Jawa, Marawas, Sasaran, Sumalangka and Wulauan) and 3 desa.
(k) except the village of Tonsea Lama, which has a post code of 95610. (l) the 2010 population of the new Kakas Barat District is included in the 2010 figure for Kakas District, from which it was split off later in 2010.

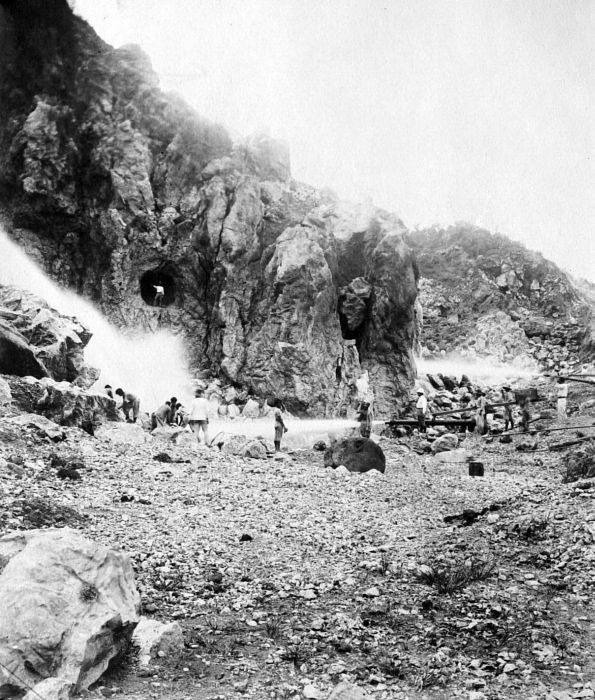
Gold mining in the Totok Minahasa Celebes gold mine

== See also ==
- Battle of Manado
