= Persma Manado =

Indonesian football club

Persma 1960
- Full name: Persatuan Sepakbola Manado 1960
- Nicknames: Badai Biru (The Blue Storm); Hiu Utara (The North Sharks)
- Founded: 1960; 66 years ago
- Ground: Klabat Stadium
- Capacity: 10,000
- Owner: Herry Gerens Pontoh
- Coach: Nelson Konore
- League: Liga 4
- 2019: Eliminated in Regional Round
Home colours	Away colours

Persatuan Sepakbola Manado 1960, commonly known as Persma 1960, Persma Manado, or simply Persma, is an Indonesian football club based in Manado, North Sulawesi. The club was founded in 1960 and currently competes in the Liga 4.

== Season-by-season records ==
Season(s)	League/Division	Tms.	Pos.	Piala Indonesia
1994–95	First Division	16	2nd	–
1995–96	Premier Division	31	11th, East division	–
1996–97	Premier Division	33	3rd, Second round	–
1997–98	Premier Division	31	did not finish	–
1998–99	Premier Division	28	3rd, Group E	–
1999–2000	Premier Division	28	7th, East division	–
2001	Premier Division	28	13th, East division	–
2002	First Division	27	3	–
2003	First Division	26	7th, Group D	–
2004	Second Division	41	3rd, Second round	–
2005	First Division	27	8th, Group 3	First round
2006	First Division	36	2nd, Second round	Quarter-final
2007–08	Premier Division	36	12th, East division	–
2008–09				
2009–10
2010–11
2011–12
2013
2014	Liga Nusantara		Eliminated in Regional round	–
2015	Liga Nusantara	season abandoned		–
2016	ISC Liga Nusantara	32	3rd, First round	–
2017	Liga 3	32	Eliminated in Provincial round	–
2018	Liga 3	32	Eliminated in Regional round	–
2019	Liga 3	32	Eliminated in Regional round	–
2025–26	Liga 4	64		–
