= Klabat Stadium =

Multi-use stadium in Indonesia

- Location in the city of Manado
- Location: Manado, North Sulawesi, Indonesia
- Coordinates: 1°27′31″N 124°50′09″E
- Owner: Pangau Family, Tontalete
- Operator: City government of Manado
- Capacity: 10,000
- Surface: Grass field

Tenants
- Persma Manado; Sulut United; Persipura Jayapura

Klabat Stadium is a multi-use stadium in Manado, North Sulawesi, Indonesia. It is currently used mostly for football matches and is used as the home venue for Persma Manado and Sulut United. It is also the former home venue for Persipura Jayapura. The stadium have a capacity of 10,000 people. The stadium is used for the friendly match between PSV Eindhoven and Persma Manado in the era of the 90s.
