= Manado =

Capital and largest city of North Sulawesi, Indonesia

Manado: Menado; Wenang
- City
- City of Manado; Kota Manado
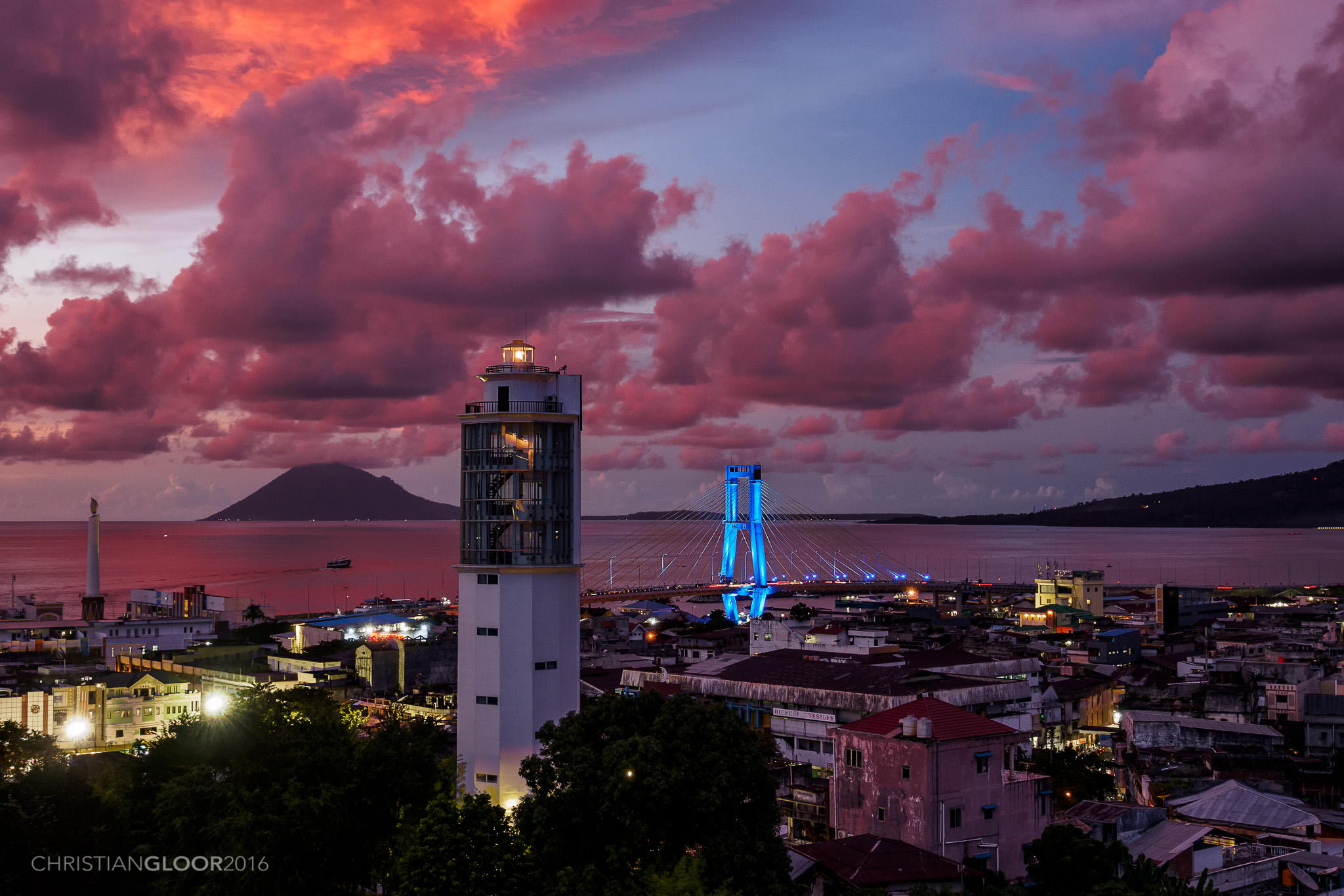
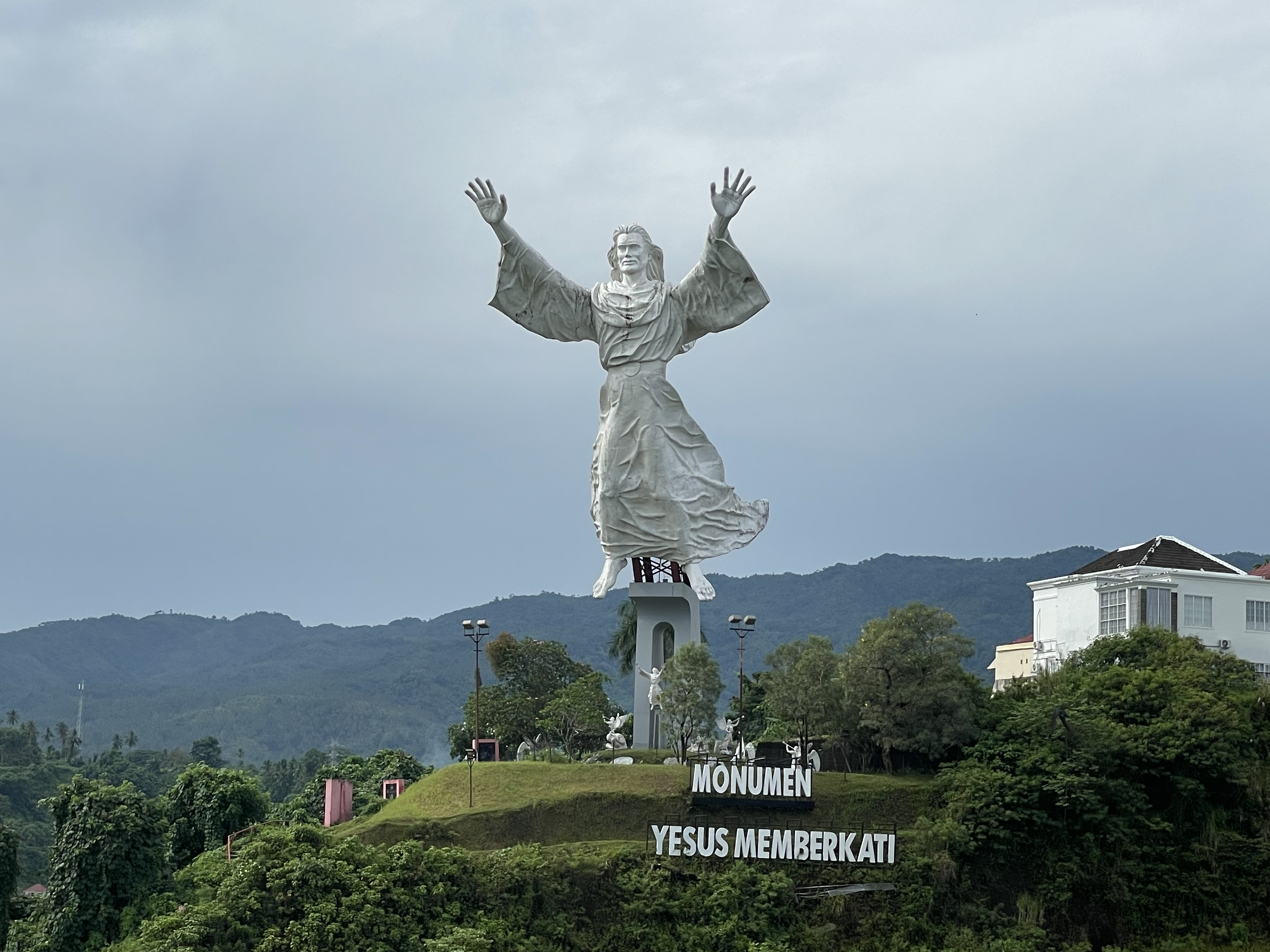
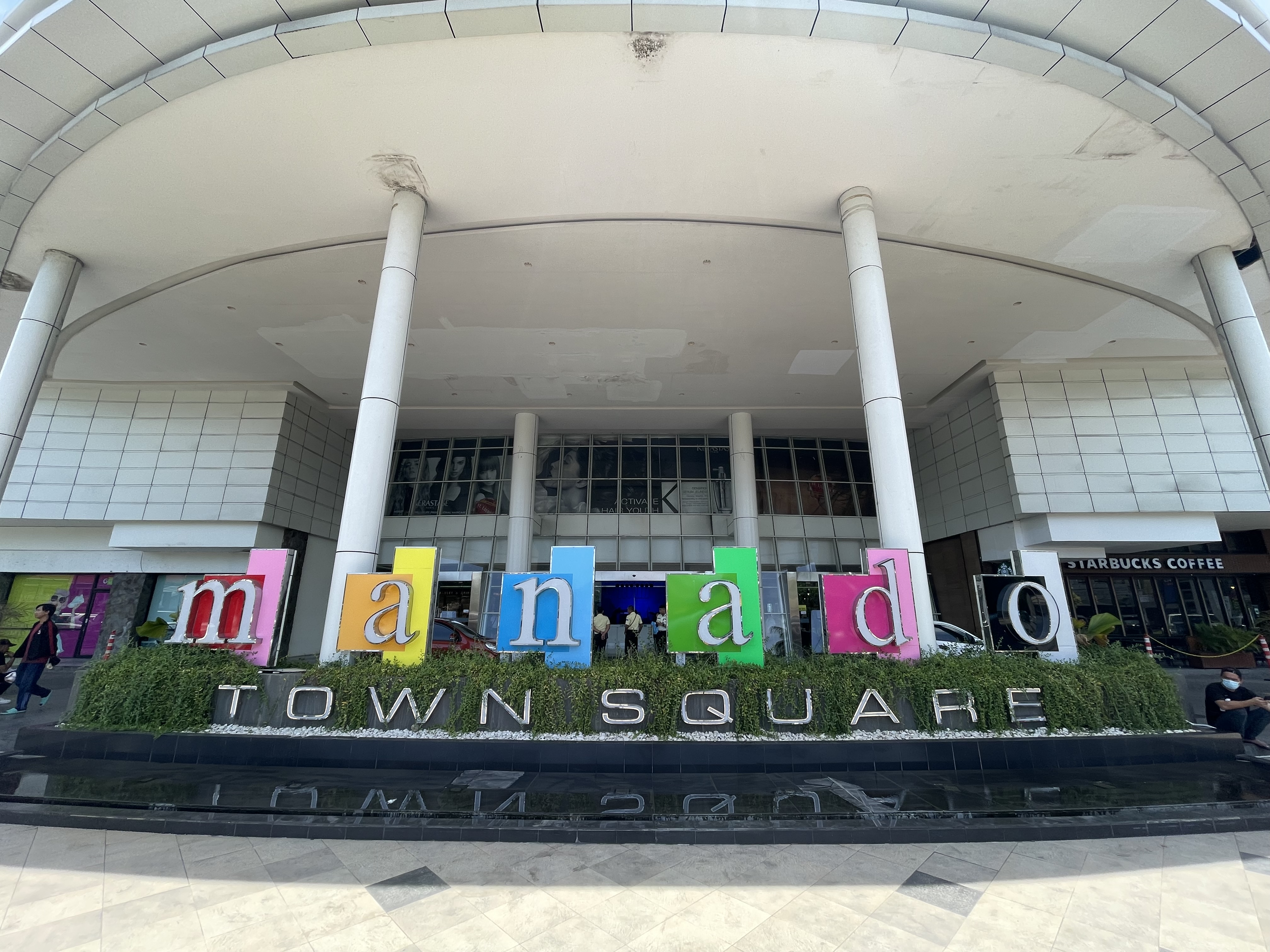
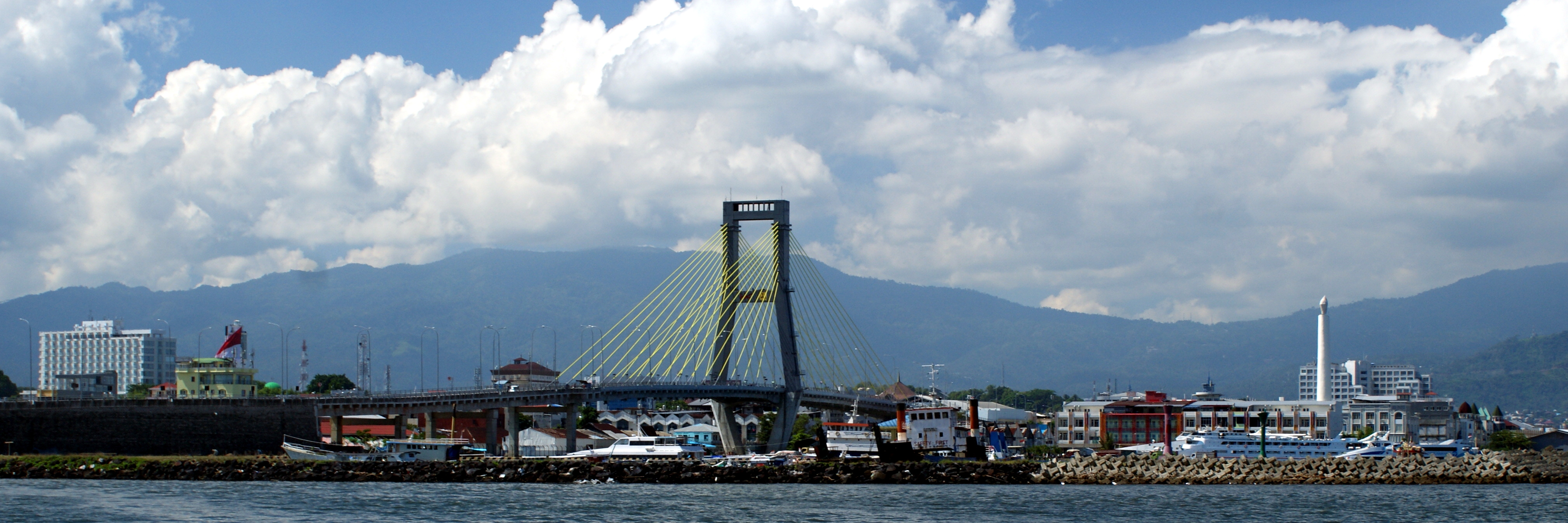
- Panoramic view of Manado during sunset Christ Blessing statue Manado Town Square Sukarno Bridge

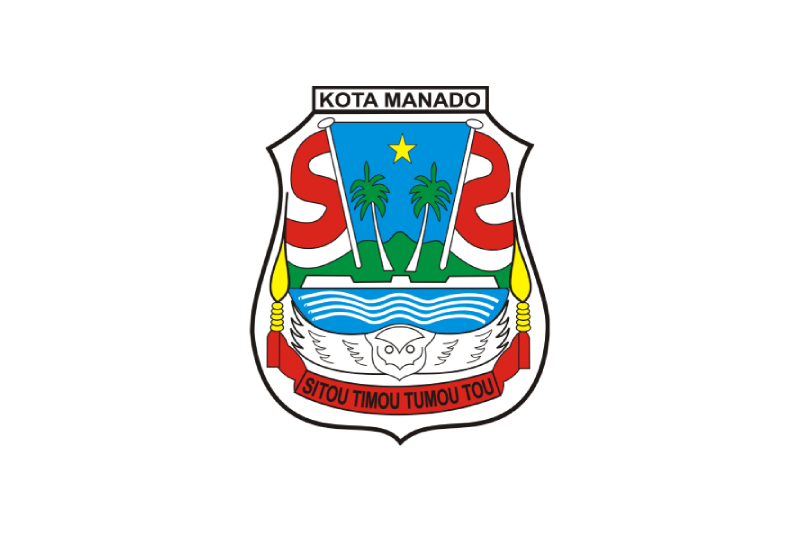
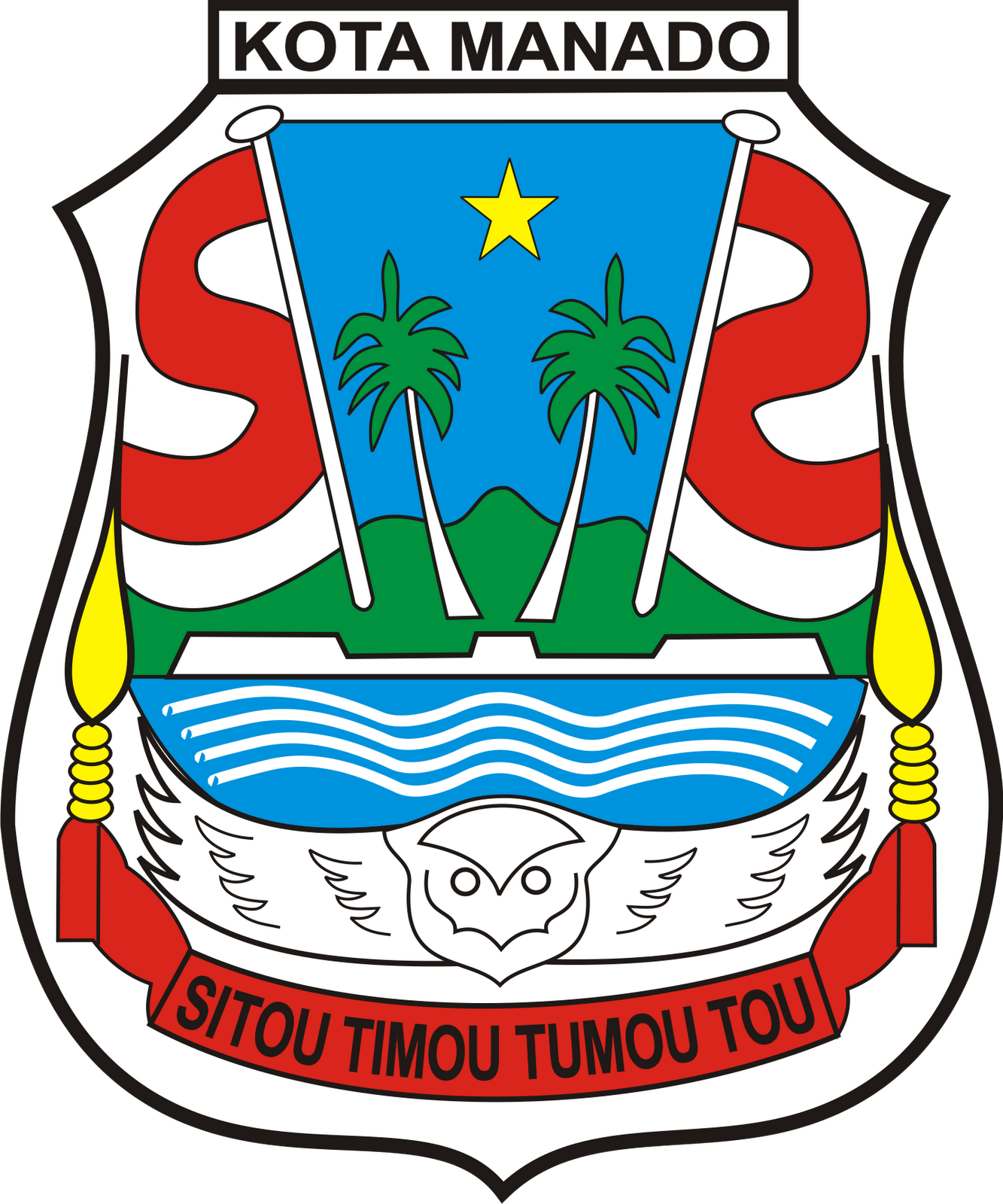
- Flag Coat of arms
- Nickname: Kota Seribu Gereja "City of a Thousand Churches"
- Motto(s): Torang Samua Basudara (Minahasan) "We are Brotherhood"
- Location within North Sulawesi
- Interactive map of Manado
- Location in Sulawesi, and Indonesia Manado (Indonesia)
- Coordinates: 1°29′35″N 124°50′28.54″E
- Country: Indonesia
- Province: North Sulawesi
- Metropolitan area: Bimindo
- Founded: 14 July 1623; 403 years ago

Government
  - Type: Mayor-council
  - Body: Manado City Government
  - Mayor: Andrei Angouw (PDI-P)
  - Vice Mayor: Richard Sualang
  - Legislature: Manado City Regional House of Representatives (DPRD)

Area
  - Total: 162.35 km^{2} (62.68 sq mi)
- Elevation: 5 m (16 ft)

Population (mid 2025 estimate)
  - Total: 462,658
  - Density: 2,849.8/km^{2} (7,380.8/sq mi)
- Demonym: Manadonese
- Time zone: UTC+8 (ICST)
- Area code: +62 431
- Vehicle registration: DB
- HDI (2023): ▲0.814 (38th) Very High
- Website: ManadoKota.go.id

Manado (Indonesian pronunciation: [maˈnado], Minahasan: Wenang) is the capital city of the Indonesian province of North Sulawesi. It is the second largest city in Sulawesi after Makassar, with the 2020 census giving a population of 451,916, and the official estimates for mid 2025 showing 462,658 inhabitants (232,553 males and 230,105 females), distributed over a land area of 162.35 km^{2}. The Manado metropolitan area had a population of 1,377,815 as of mid 2023. The city is situated on the Bay of Manado, and is surrounded by a mountainous area.

Manado is among Indonesia's top-five tourism priorities and Bunaken National Park is one of the city's most famous tourist attractions. Tunan Waterfall in Talawaan village and Mount Tumpa are some of the many attractions for visitors who like to take Manado city tour especially to natural places. The city is served by Sam Ratulangi International Airport, which connects Manado with various domestic destinations, as well as international destinations in East Asia and Southeast Asia. The city is also known for its Christian-majority population, and holds the country's biggest Christmas celebration annually. It is also recognised as one of the most tolerant and peaceful cities in Indonesia.

== Etymology ==
The name Manado is derived from the Sangir language word manaro, meaning 'on the far coast' or 'in the distance', and originally referred to the further of two islands which can be seen from the mainland. When the settlement on this island was relocated to the mainland, the name Manado was brought with it, after which the island itself became referred to as Manado Tua (Old Manado). The name for Manado in the Sangir language is Manaro, while in Gorontalo is Moladu.

== History ==
The first mention of Manado comes from a world map by French cartographer Nicolas Desliens, which shows the island of Manarow (today's Manado Tua). Before Europeans arrived in North Sulawesi, the area was under the rule of the Sultan of Ternate, who exacted tribute and introduced Islam to its inhabitants. The Portuguese made the Sultan their vassal, ruling over the Minahasa people, and establishing a factory in Wenang.

Meanwhile, the Spanish had already set themselves up in the Philippines and Minahasa was used to plant coffee because of its rich soil. Manado was further developed by Spain as a centre of commerce for the Chinese traders who traded the coffee in China. With the help of native allies, the Spanish took over the Portuguese fortress in Amurang in the 1550s, and Spanish settlers also established a fort at Manado, so that eventually, Spain controlled all of the Minahasa. It was in Manado where one of the first Indo-Eurasian (Mestizo) communities in the archipelago developed during the 16th century. The first King of Manado (1630) named Muntu Untu was in fact the son of a Spanish Mestizo.

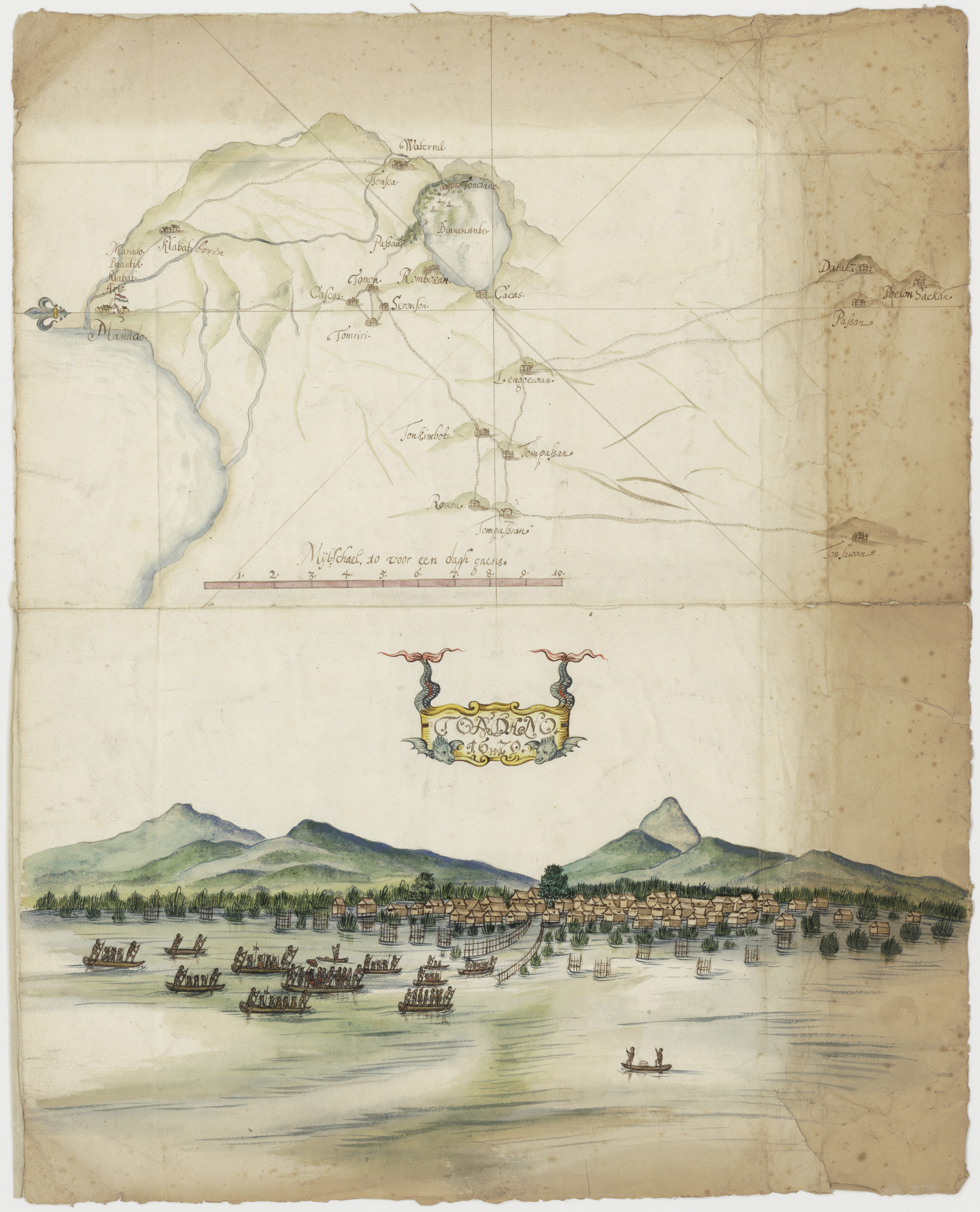
Map of Manado in 1679

Spain renounced its possessions in Minahasa by means of a treaty with the Portuguese in return for a payment of 350,000 ducats. Minahasan natives made an alliance treaty with the Dutch, and expelled the last of the Portuguese from Manado a few years later.

The Dutch East India Company built a fortress in Manado named Fort Amsterdam in 1658. As with regions in eastern Indonesia, Manado underwent Christianisation by missionaries such as Johann Friedrich Riedel and Johann Gottlieb Schwarz. The Dutch missionaries built the first Christian church in Manado called Oude Kerk (Old church), which still stands, and is now called Gereja Sentrum. HMS Dover captured Manado in June 1810. The Javanese prince Diponegoro was exiled to Manado by the Dutch government in 1830 for leading a war of rebellion against the Dutch. In 1859, the English biologist Alfred Wallace visited Manado and praised the town for its beauty.

Coat of Arms of Manado during Dutch colonial era, granted in 1931.

In 1919, the Apostolic Prefecture of Celebes was established in the city. In 1961, it was promoted to the Diocese of Manado.

The Japanese captured Manado in the Battle of Manado in January 1942. The city was heavily damaged by Allied bombing during World War II.

In 1958, the headquarters of the rebel movement Permesta was moved to Manado. When Permesta confronted the central government with demands for political, economic and regional reform, Jakarta responded by bombing the city in February 1958, and then invading in June 1958.

In 1962, the People's Representative Council declared Manado as the official capital city of North Sulawesi Province.

== Climate ==
Manado has a tropical rainforest climate (Af) according to the Köppen climate classification, as there is no real dry season. The wettest month is January, with an average rainfall of 465 millimetres (18.3 in), while the driest is September with an average rainfall of 121 millimetres (4.8 in). The abundance of rain seems to be influenced by the monsoon. As its location is near the equator, the temperature is essentially constant throughout the year. The hottest month is August with an average temperature of 26.6 °C (79.9 °F), while the coolest months are January and February with an average temperature of 25.4 °C (77.7 °F).

Climate data for Manado, North Sulawesi, Indonesia (1961–1990)
Month	Jan	Feb	Mar	Apr	May	Jun	Jul	Aug	Sep	Oct	Nov	Dec	Year
Mean daily maximum °C (°F)	29.4 (84.9)	29.5 (85.1)	30.0 (86.0)	31.4 (88.5)	31.4 (88.5)	31.2 (88.2)	31.3 (88.3)	32.0 (89.6)	32.3 (90.1)	31.7 (89.1)	30.9 (87.6)	30.1 (86.2)	30.9 (87.6)
Daily mean °C (°F)	25.4 (77.7)	25.4 (77.7)	25.7 (78.3)	26.4 (79.5)	26.4 (79.5)	26.2 (79.2)	26.1 (79.0)	26.6 (79.9)	26.4 (79.5)	26.3 (79.3)	26.3 (79.3)	25.8 (78.4)	26.1 (79.0)
Mean daily minimum °C (°F)	22.3 (72.1)	22.2 (72.0)	22.3 (72.1)	22.4 (72.3)	22.4 (72.3)	22.3 (72.1)	21.8 (71.2)	21.9 (71.4)	21.2 (70.2)	21.8 (71.2)	22.3 (72.1)	22.5 (72.5)	22.1 (71.8)
Average rainfall mm (inches)	427 (16.8)	361 (14.2)	338 (13.3)	266 (10.5)	268 (10.6)	277 (10.9)	170 (6.7)	121 (4.8)	149 (5.9)	256 (10.1)	290 (11.4)	365 (14.4)	3,288 (129.6)
Mean monthly sunshine hours	129	119	155	168	168	144	176	210	179	172	157	152	1,929
Source: Deutscher Wetterdienst

== Administrative districts ==
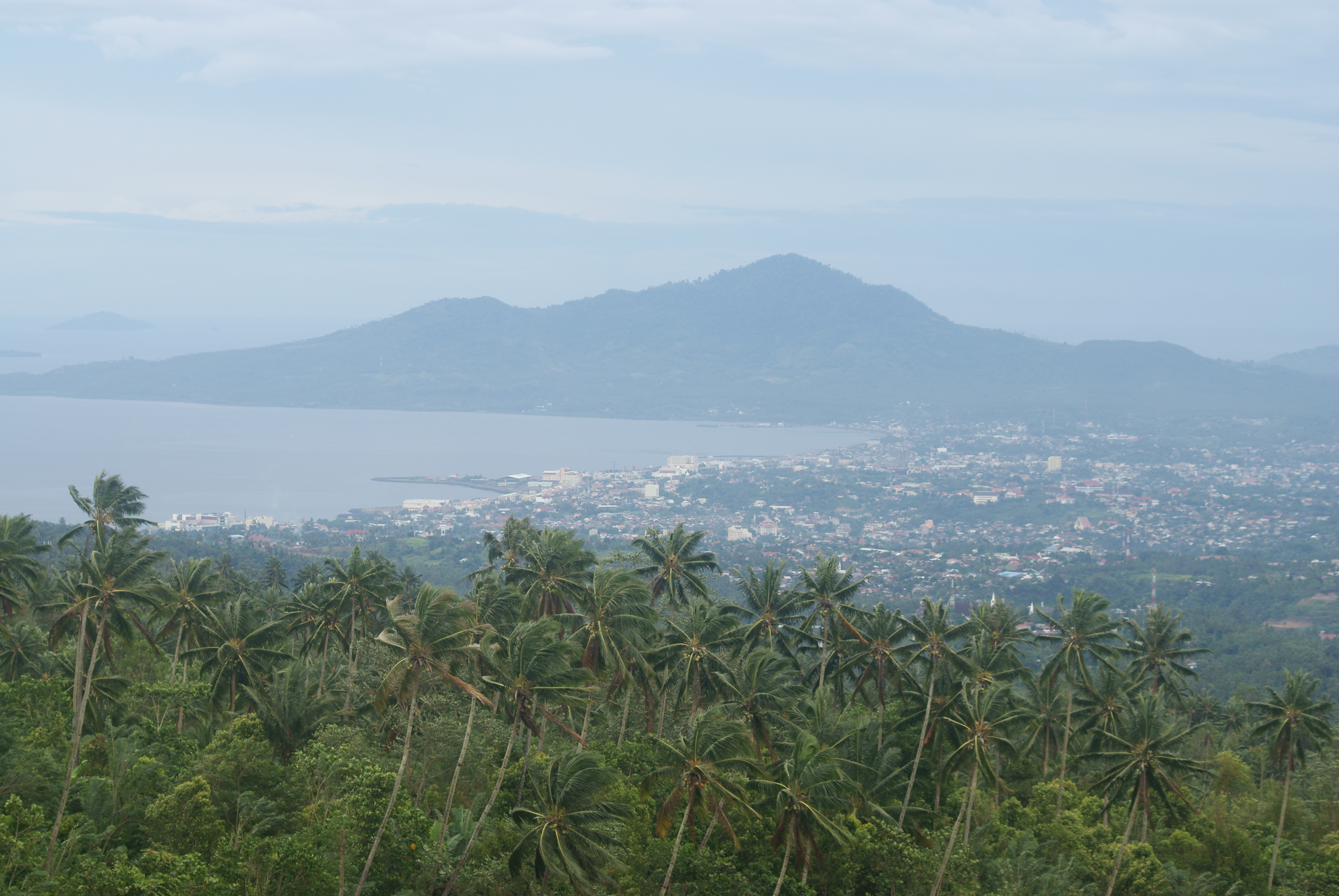
Manado and its bay taken from Tinoor village

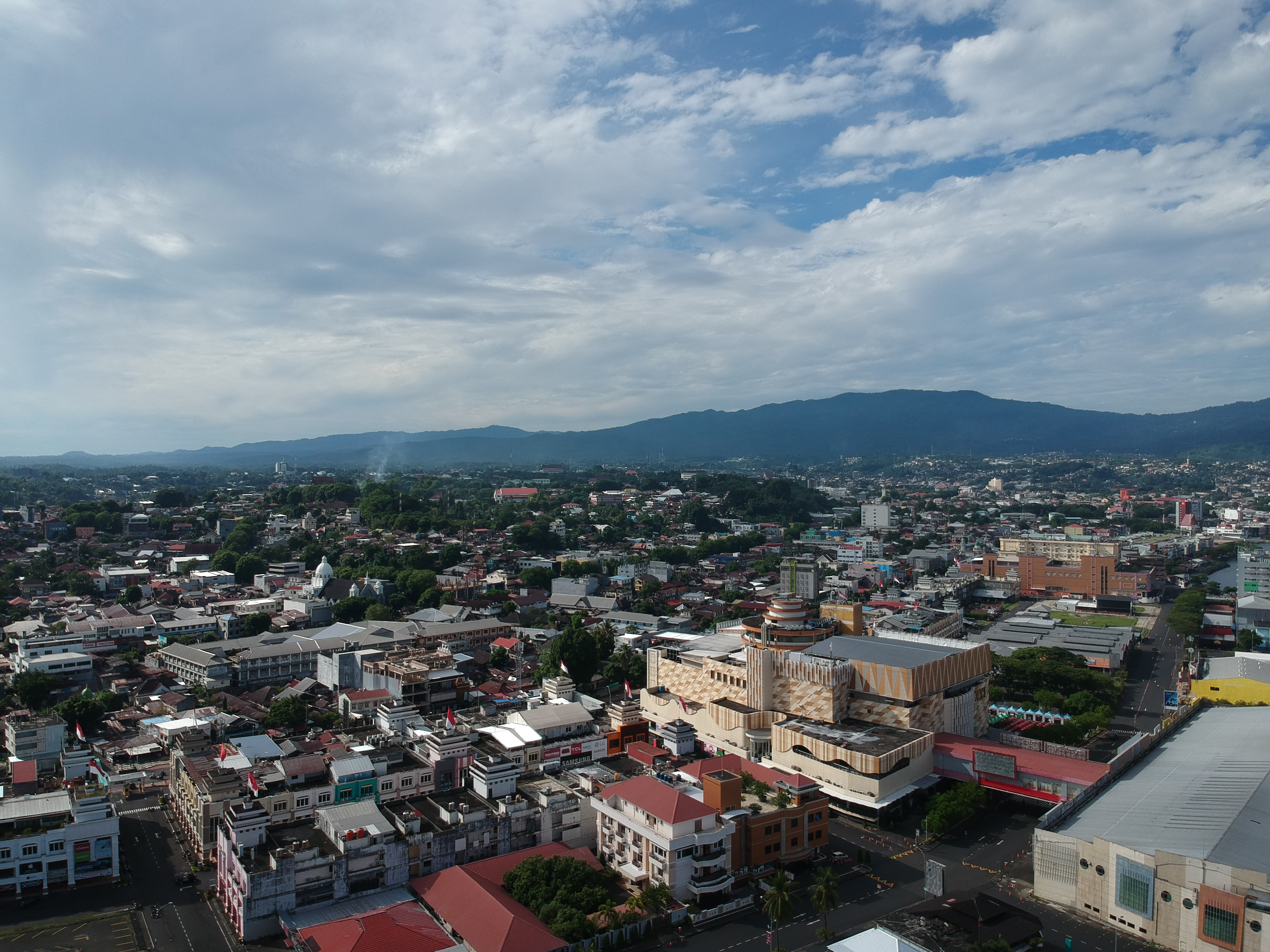
Manado drone view from Megamall complex

The city is divided into eleven districts (kecamatan), including the new districts of Bunaken Kepulauan (Bunaken Islands) and Paal Dua established in 2012. These are all tabulated below with their areas and populations at the 2010 census and 2020 census, together with the official estimates as of mid 2025. The table also includes the location of the district administrative centres, the number of urban villages (all rated as kelurahan) in each district, and its post codes.

Kode; Wilayah	Name of District (kecamatan)	Area in km^{2}	Pop'n census 2010	Pop'n census 2020	Pop'n estimate mid 2025	Admin centre	No. of villages	Post codes
71.71.09	Malalayang	17.68	54,959	61,891	63,076	Malalayang Satu	9	95115 - 95163
71.71.06	Sario	2.00	23,198	21,740	20,798	Sario	7	95113 - 95116
71.71.07	Wanea	8.70	56,962	59,757	59,347	Wanea	9	95117 - 95119
71.71.04	Wenang	3.38	32,796	32,601	32,190	Tikala Kumaraka	12	95111 - 95124
71.71.05	Tikala	6.68	69,734	30,174	31,214	Tikala Baru	5	95124 - 95129
71.71.11	Paal Dua	9.37	^{(a)}	44,015	43,679	Ranomuut	7	95127 - 95129
71.71.08	Mapanget	53.59	53,194	63,275	69,154	Paniki Bawah	10	95249 - 95259
71.71.03	Singkil	4.88	46,721	52,732	54,112	Singkil	9	95231 - 95234
71.71.02	Tuminting	5.26	52,089	53,759	54,548	Bitung Karang Ria	10	95238 - 95239
71.71.01	Bunaken	32.03	20,828	25,669	28,186	Molas	5	95231 - 95249
71.71.10	Bunaken Kepulauan ^{(b)}	18.78	^{(c)}	6,303	6,354	Bunaken	4	95231 - 95246
	Totals	162.35	410,481	451,916	462,658		87	

Notes:
(a) the 2010 population of Paal Dua District is included in the figure for Tikala District, from which it was cut out in 2013.
(b) including the small offshore islands of Pulau Bunaken, Pulau Siladen, and Pulau Manadotua. These islands form (with the larger Mantehage Island and Nain Island in North Minahasa Regency) the land components of the Bunaken National Park.
(c) the 2010 population of Bunaken Kepulauan District is included in the figure for Bunaken District, from which it was cut out in 2013.

The boundaries of Manado city are as follows:

- East = Minahasa Regency
- North = North Minahasa Regency
- South = Minahasa Regency
- West = Celebes Sea

== Demographics ==
=== Ethnicity and languages ===
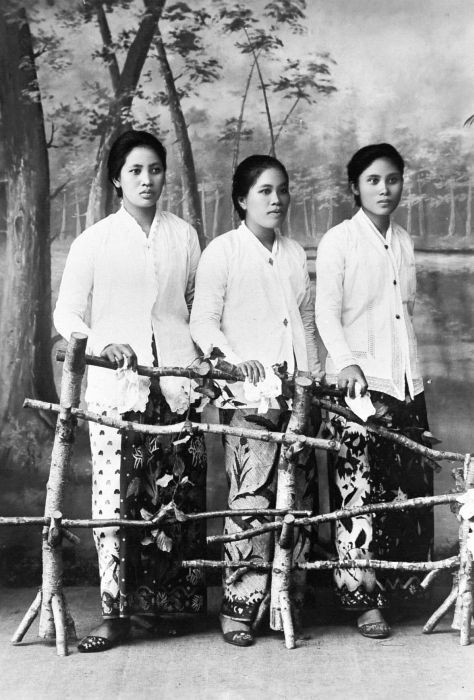
Minahasa women, circa 1940s

Currently, the majority of Manado city residents are from the Minahasa ethnic group. The indigenous people of Manado are from the Tombulu sub-tribe. The Tombulu language is considered one of the Minahasa languages and is spoken widely in several urban villages within Manado, for example: Wenang (Wenang / Mahawenang - kolintang), Tumumpa (down), Mahakeret (yelling), Tikala Ares (Walak Ares Tombulu, where the word 'ares' means punishable), Ranotana (ground water), Winangun (built), Wawonasa (wawoinasa - sharpened above), Pinaesaan (unity place), Pakowa (Tree of Treasure), Teling (fur / bamboo to make equipment), Titiwungen (excavated), Tuminting (from the word Ting-Ting: a bell, the inserted syllable -um- changing the noun to a verb, so Tuminting: ringing bell), Pondol (Edge), Wanea (from the word Wanua: meaning the country), etc. While the Malalayang area has residents mainly from the Bantik people, other indigenous groups in Manado today are from the Sangir, Gorontalo, Mongondow, Babontehu, Talaud, Tionudese, Siau, and Borgo peoples. There are also Arabian peranakan communities, mainly in the Kampung Arab area which is near Pasar '45 and has become a destination for religious tourism. Other ethnicities represented include Javanese, Chinese, Batak, Makassar, and Moluccans. A small Jewish community also exists.

Manado Malay is the main language spoken in Manado. It is a Malay-based creole. Some of the loan words in the Minahasan vernacular are derived from Dutch, Portuguese, and other foreign languages.

=== Religion ===
As of 2023, Christianity is the major religion in Manado, constituting around 68.21 percent of all residents, Islam comes second forming about 30.93 percent, and the rest follow Buddhism, Hinduism, and Confucianism, each coming in at less than 1 percent each, according to North Sulawesi regional office of Statistics Indonesia. In addition, about 20 Indonesian Jews live in Manado. The people of Manado identify as tolerant, harmonious, open and dynamic. Therefore, the city of Manado has a relatively conducive social environment, and is known as one of the safest cities in Indonesia. When Indonesia was vulnerable to political upheaval around 1999, and there were riots in other Indonesian cities, Manado was little affected. This is shown through the slogan of the people of Manado: Torang samua basudara, which means We are all family. And also through the words of Dr. Sam Ratulangi: "Sitou, Timou, Tumou, Tou", which roughly translates to 'Man lives to educate others'.

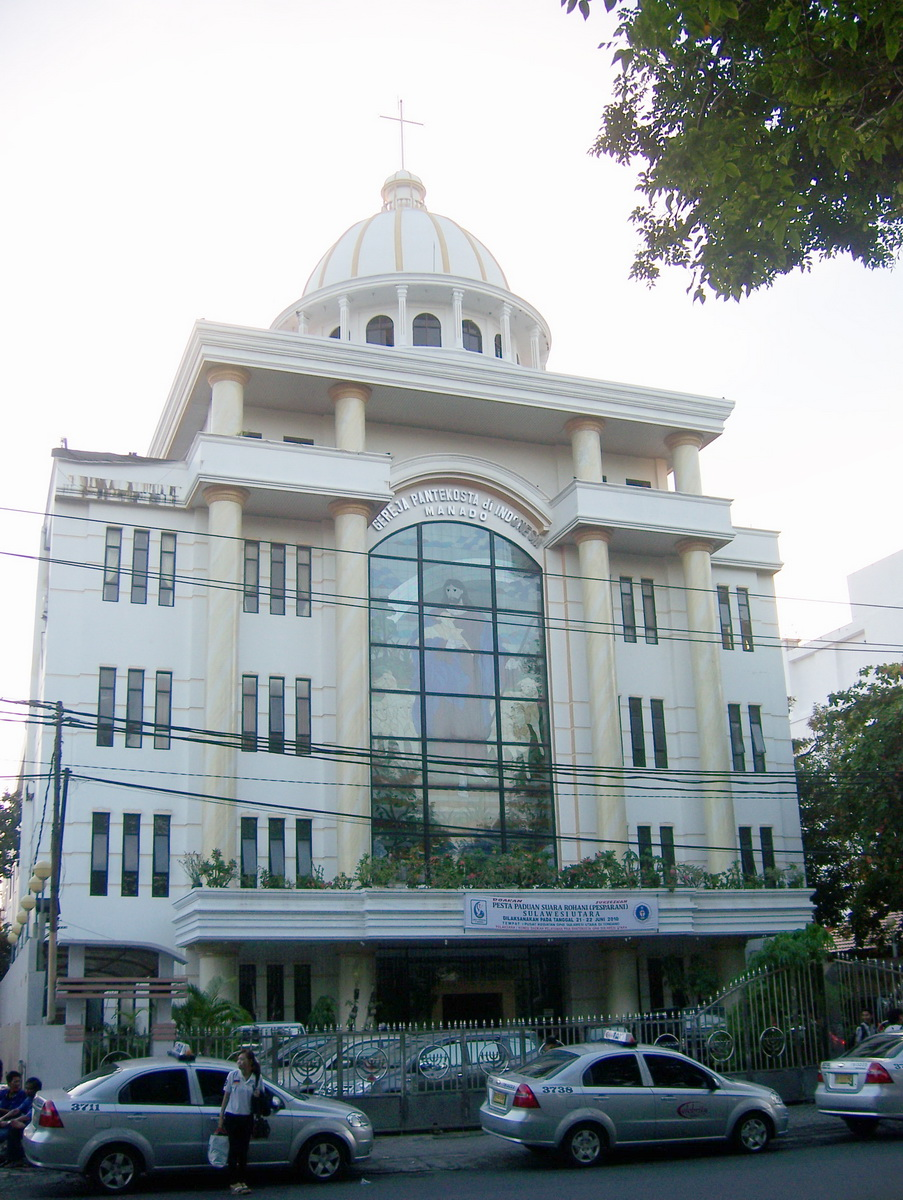
Indonesia Pentecostal Church in Manado

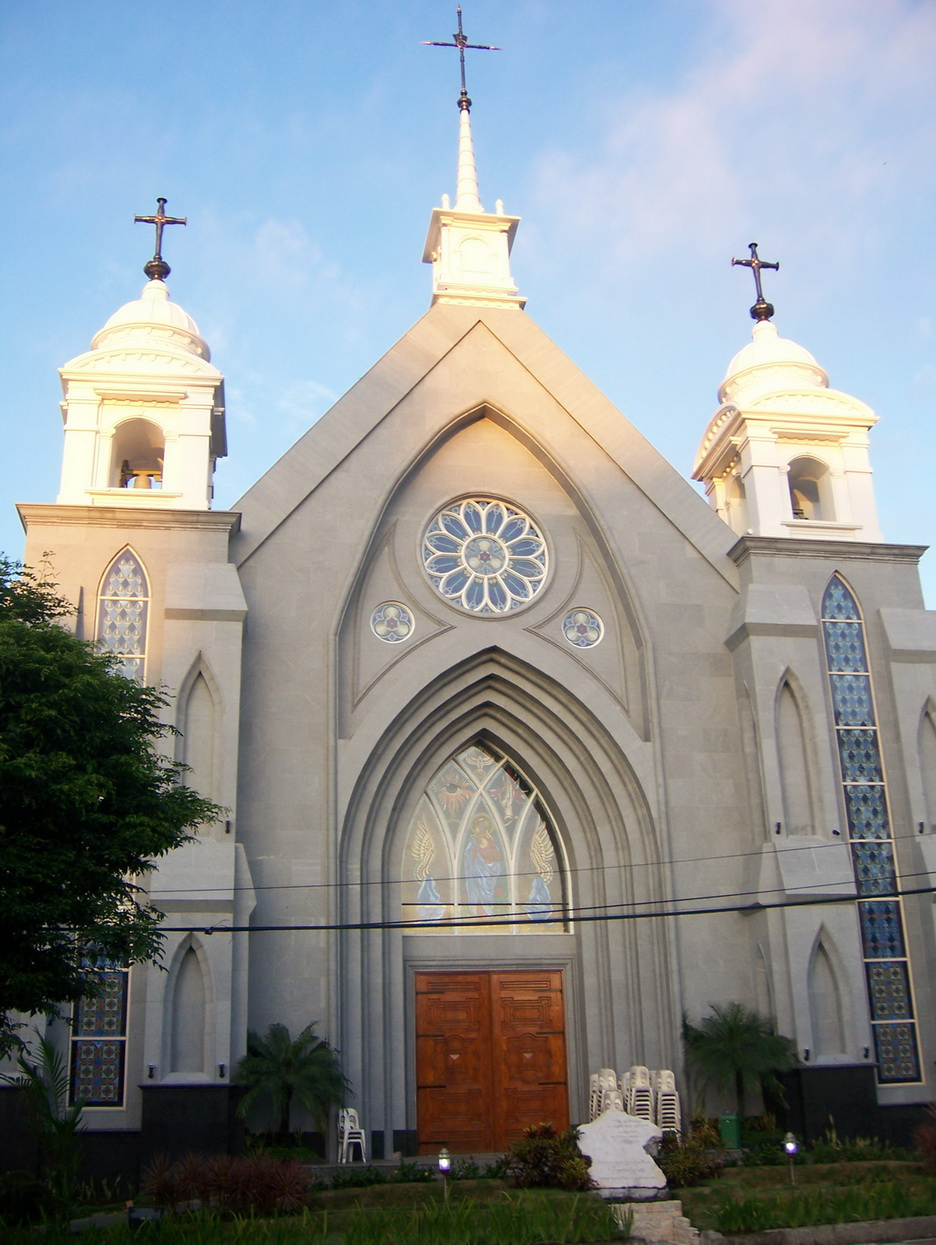
St. Mary of the Sacred Heart Parish Cathedral, Manado

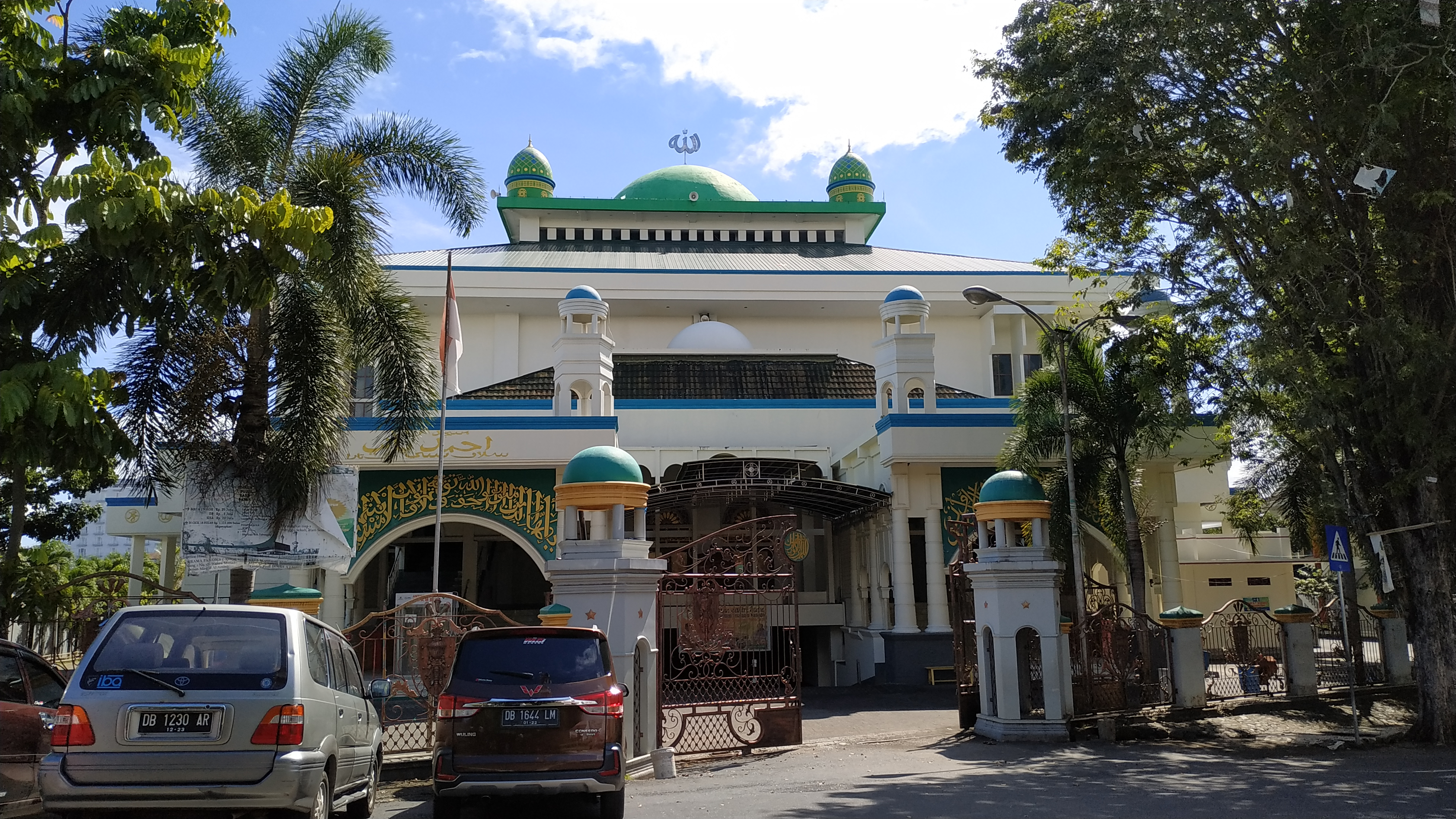
Manado Great Mosque

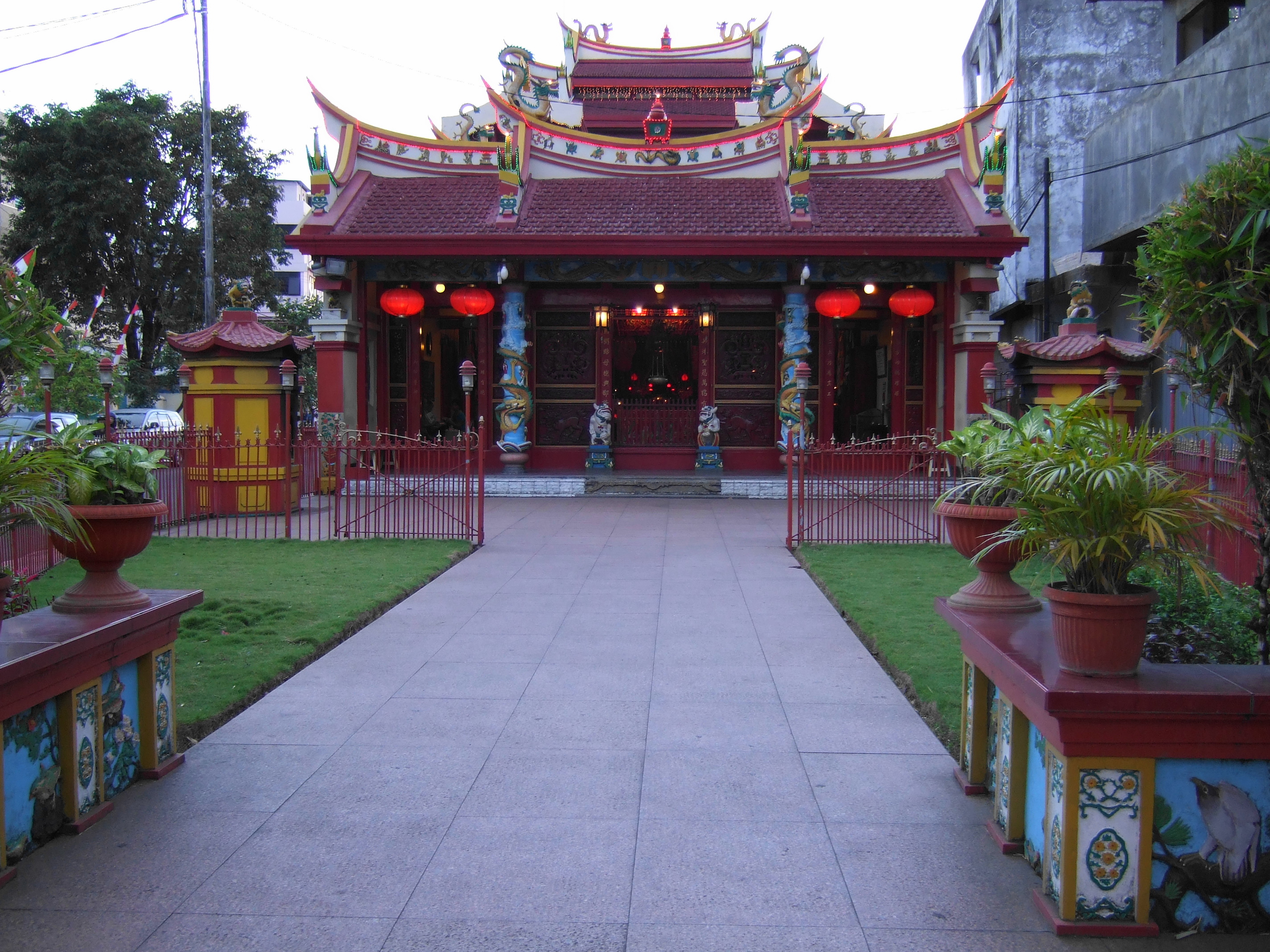
Ban Hin Kiong Temple

== Transportation ==
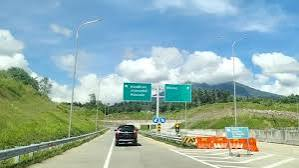
Manado–Bitung Toll Road

Sam Ratulangi International Airport of Manado is one of the main ports of entry to Indonesia. In 2005, more than 15,000 international passengers entered Indonesia via Manado airport, connected with other major cities like Jakarta, Surabaya and Makassar, etc. Manado is also connected with several major cities in Asia for international routes.

Other public transportation in Manado are:

1. Local share taxi services, known as mikrolets.
2. Perum DAMRI buses serving airport to Manado
3. Other buses serving Manado to other cities in North Sulawesi as well as other cities in the island of Sulawesi

Manado–Bitung Toll Road connects the city with Bitung. Terminal Malalayang, or Malalayang Bus Terminal serves as the main gateway for long-distance buses in Manado.

== Cityscape ==
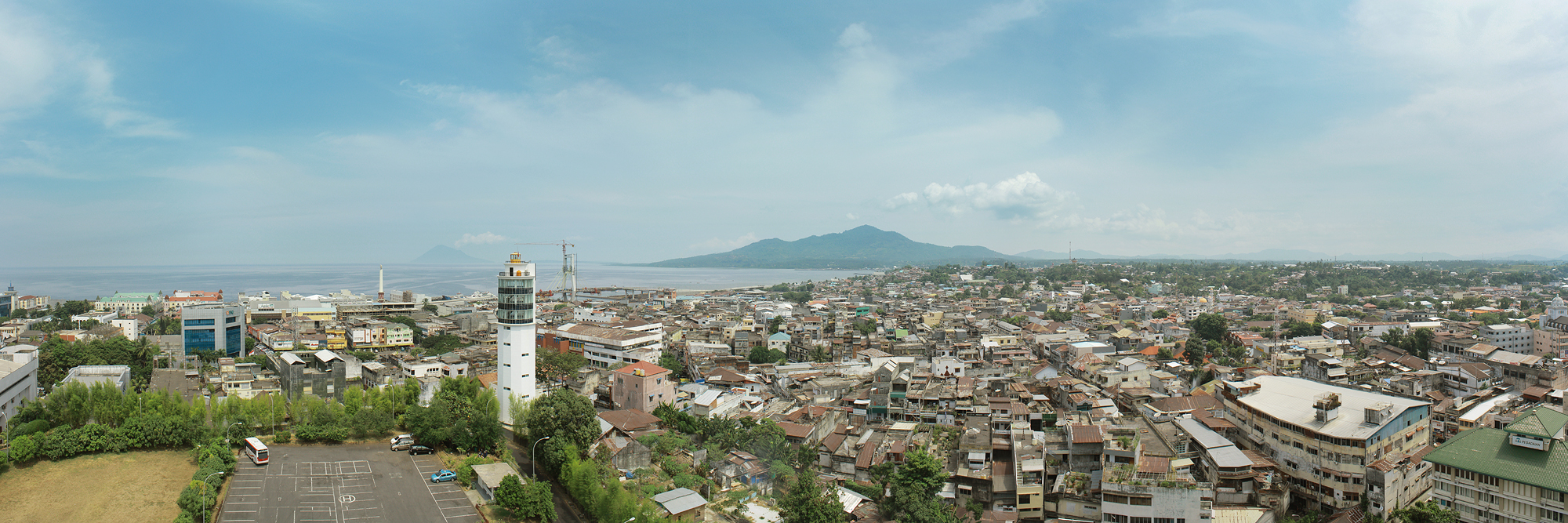
Panoramic view of Manado

Manado is home to some of the biggest and most influential churches in the province, with many of them located along the iconic Sam Ratulangi Street.

=== Tourism ===
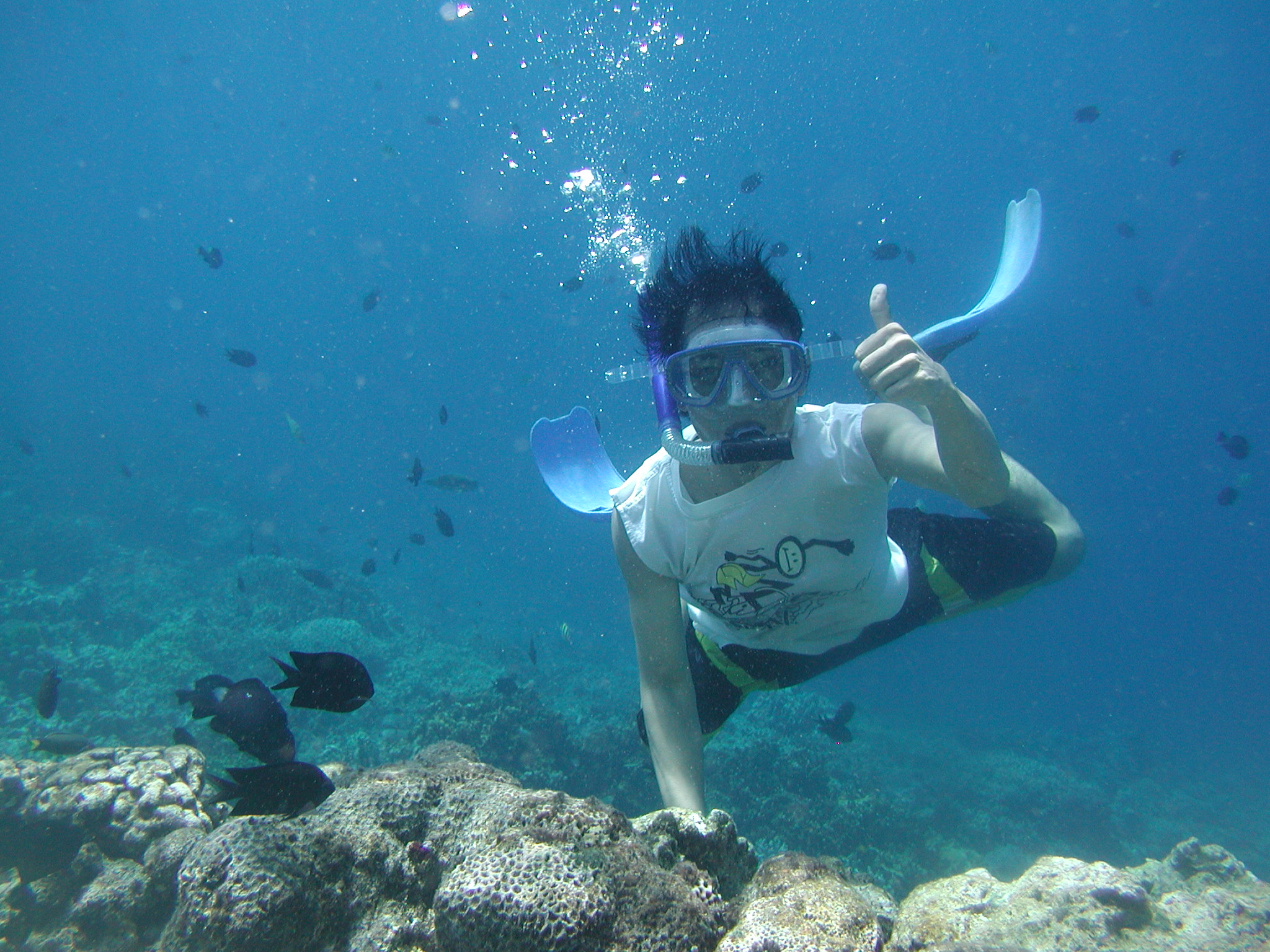
Snorkeling around Bunaken

- Ban Hin Kiong Temple is the oldest temple in the city of Manado, which was established in 1819. It is also a popular tourism spot in the city, especially during the Chinese New Year celebration.
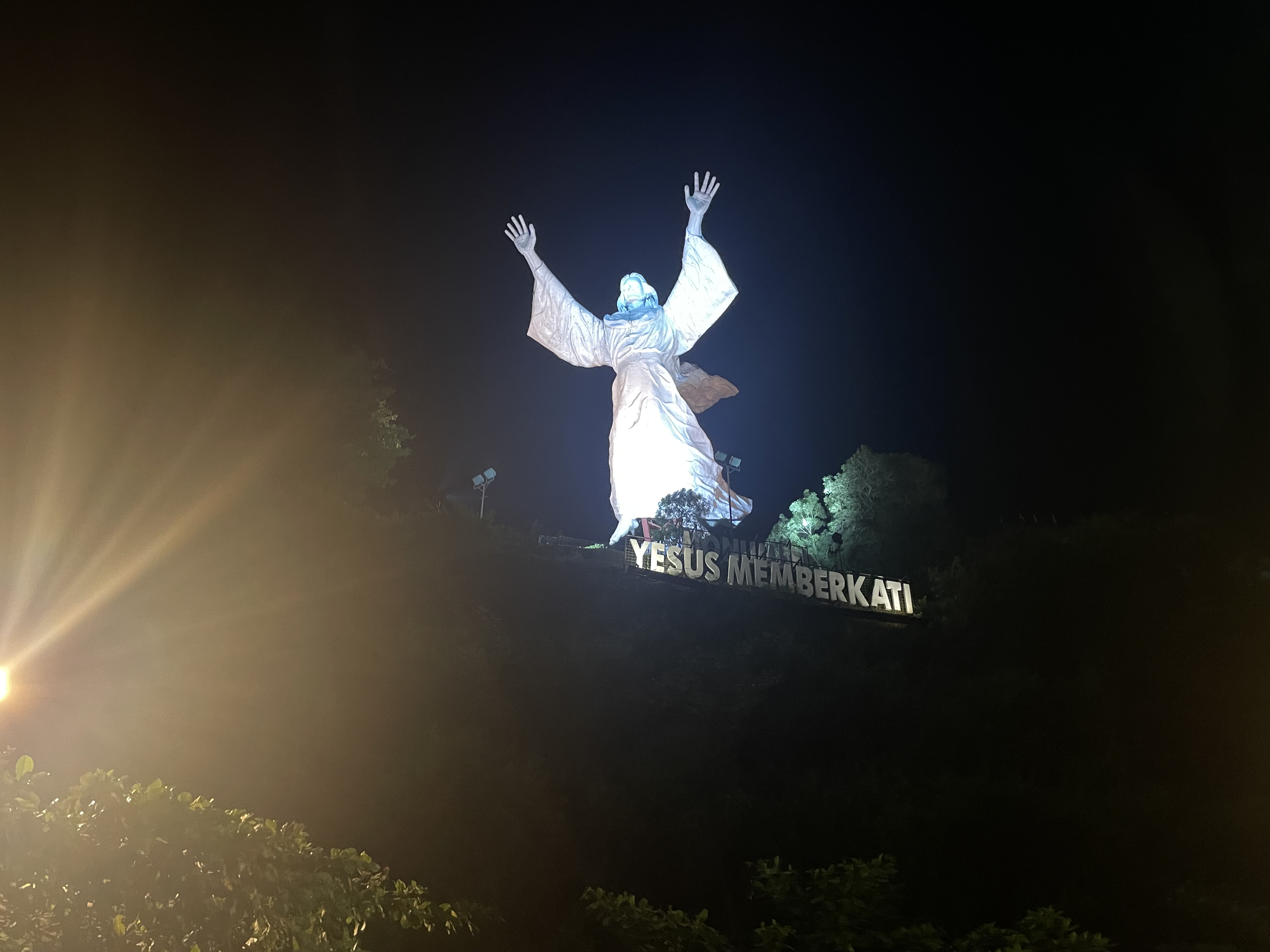
- Yesus Kase Berkat statue in Manado
  Citraland, a wealthy suburb of Manado, is home to Asia's second tallest and the world's fourth tallest statue of Christ (Christ Blessing Statue), and perhaps the world's first statue in the flying posture.
- Manado Boulevard Carnaval (MBC) is a fashion carnival annually every 16 July, aligned with Manado City Birthday.
- Other places of interest include nearby Lake Tondano, Lake Linow, Lokon Volcano, Klabat Volcano and Mahawu Volcano, Bukit Kasih (hill of love), and Watu Pinabetengan.
- Scuba diving and snorkelling are practised in the nearby Bunaken National Park, including the island of Bunaken.
- Several shopping malls in the city are: Manado Town Square, Star Square, and Grand Kawanua City

=== Cuisine ===
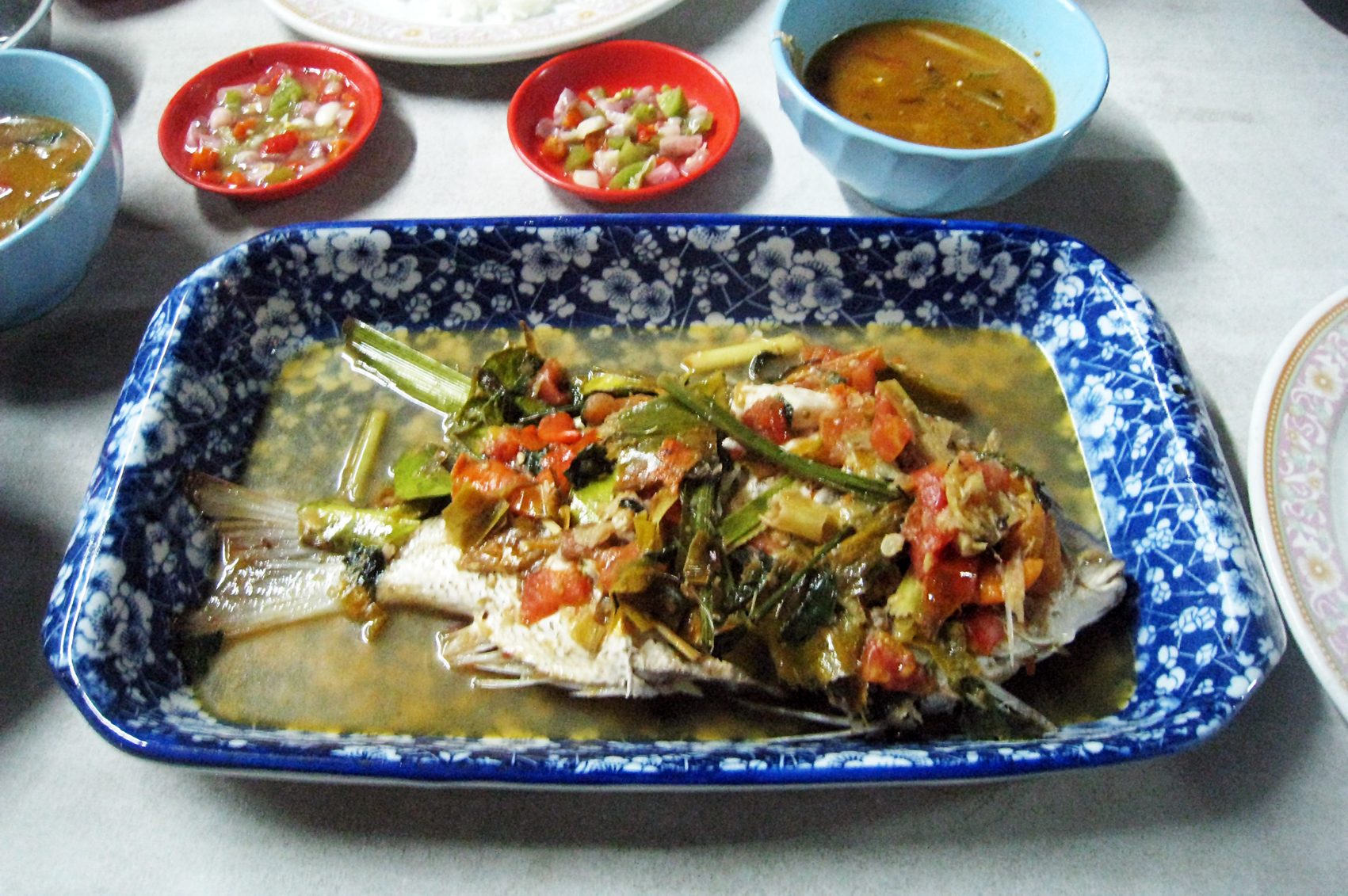
Fish Woku

Food typical of Manado include tinutuan, a porridge consisting of various kinds of vegetables. In addition to tinutuan, there is cakalang fufu, a smoked skipjack (Katsuwonus pelamis), roa fish (exocoetidae or torani) Parexocoetus brachypterus, kawok which is based on the meat of the forest rodent white rat Maxomys hellwandii; paniki, bat meat-based dishes; such as (Pteropus pumilus) and rinte wuuk (abbreviated to RW) which is a local name of dog meat, pork (a pig is cooked rotating over embers, usually served at parties), and babi putar (made from pork mixed with Manado spices, rolled and burned in bamboo).

There is also a typical drink from the area of Manado and its surroundings are saguer which is a kind of wine or palm wine derived from enau / aren tree (Arenga pinnata), which is then fermented. Saguer is a cap tikus (spirits with an average of 40% alcohol content). The exact amount of alcohol depends on the technique of distillation, which varies among different Minahasa villages).

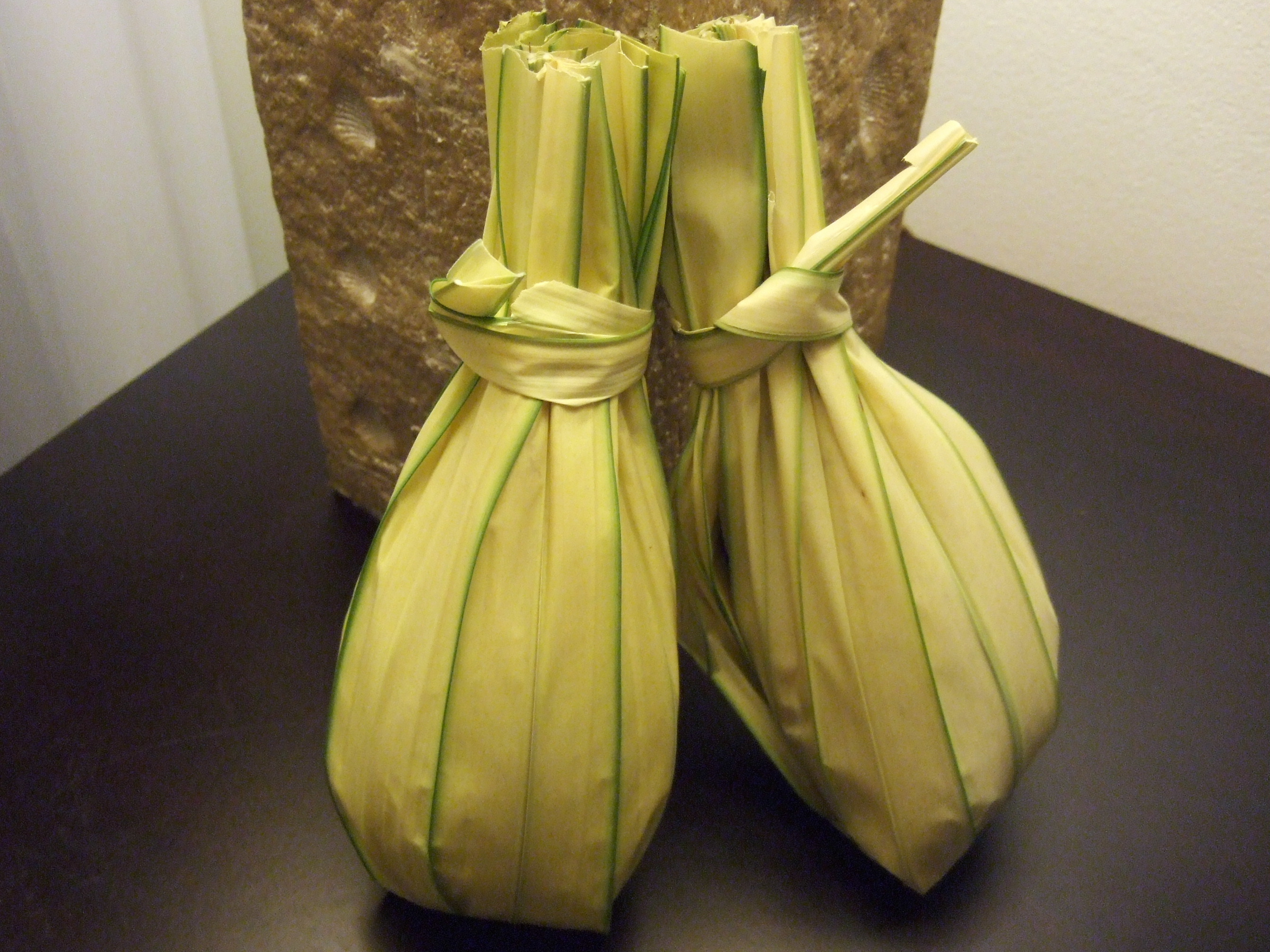
Manado styled Nasi Kuning

Woku is a type of bumbu (spice mixture) found in Manado cuisine of North Sulawesi, Indonesia. It has rich aroma and spicy taste. Woku consist of ground spices paste; red ginger, turmeric, candlenut, and red chili pepper, mixed with chopped shallot, scallion, tomato, lemon or citrus leaf, and turmeric leaf, lemon basil leaf, and bruised lemongrass. Rub main ingredients (chicken or fish) with salt and lime juices, and marinate for 30 minutes. All spices are cooked in coconut oil until the aroma came up and mixed together with the main ingredients, water, and a pinch of salt, well until all cooked well.

Other typical food of Manado city which is also quite famous is nasi kuning which taste and looks different from yellow rice in other area because it is spiked with abon of cakalang rica fish and presented in a parcel using sugar palm leaves. There is also grilled fish roasted head. Dabu-dabu is a very popular typical Manado sauce, made from a mixture of red chilies, cayenne pepper, sliced red onion, and freshly diced tomatoes, and finally given a mixture of soy sauce.

== Sister cities ==
- Davao City, Philippines
- Eindhoven, Netherlands
- Koror, Palau
- Qingdao, China
- San Sebastian, Spain
- Zamboanga City, Philippines

== Language ==
The local language spoken in Manado and the surrounding area is a creole of the Malay language called Manado Malay. It exhibits significant influence of Portuguese, Spanish and Dutch, for example:

- "But" in Indonesian is "tapi", in Manado it is called "mar" (maar- Dutch word for but).
- Chair in Indonesian is "kursi", in Minahasa it is called "kadera" (cadeira - Portuguese for chair).
- Horse in Indonesian is "kuda", a word of Sanskrit origin. In the town of Tomohon, a horse is called "kafalio" ("cavalo" - Portuguese, "caballo" - Spanish).

While there is not much known about the origin of ideogramatical Minahasa writing system, currently the orthography used for indigenous Minahasan languages closely matches that used for Indonesian.

== Notable people ==
- Adrianus Taroreh (1966–2013), boxer; competed in the men's lightweight event at the 1988 Summer Olympics
- Alexander Andries Maramis (1897–1977), politician; national hero of Indonesia
- Audrey Vanessa Susilo (born 1999), Miss Indonesia 2022 winner
- Bahar bin Smith (born 1985), Islamist scholar, sayyid and preacher (da'i)
- Benny Dollo (1950–2023), football coach; former head coach of Indonesia national football team
- Bonyx Saweho (born 1982), boxer; competed in the men's flyweight event at the 2004 Summer Olympics
- Daan Mogot (1928–1946), military officer; involved in the Indonesian National Revolution
- Firman Utina (born 1981), footballer; former captain of Indonesia national football team
- Michael Soeoth (born 2007), footballer
- Greysia Polii (born 1987), badminton player; gold medalist at the 2020 Summer Olympics
- Henk Ngantung (1927–1991), painter and politician; governor of Jakarta (1964–1965)
- Jeanne Mandagi (1937–2017), Police Brigadier General; first Indonesian woman to become a police general
- John Lie (1911–1988), navy officer; national hero of Indonesia
- Kezia Warouw (born 1991), Puteri Indonesia 2016 winner
- Kristania Virginia Besouw (born 1985), Miss Indonesia 2006 winner
- Liliyana Natsir (born 1985), badminton player; gold medalist at the 2016 Summer Olympics
- Monica Khonado (born 1996), Miss Earth Indonesia 2020 winner
- Robert Wolter Mongisidi (1925–1949), national hero of Indonesia; involved in the Indonesian National Revolution
- Rocky Gerung (born 1959), Indonesian philosopher and public intellectual
- Yaakov Baruch (born 1982), rabbi of Sha'ar Hashamayim Synagogue (Tondano)

== See also ==
- List of regencies and cities of Indonesia
