= History of the Jews in Indonesia =

Indonesian Jews Orang Yahudi di Indonesia יהודים אינדונזים
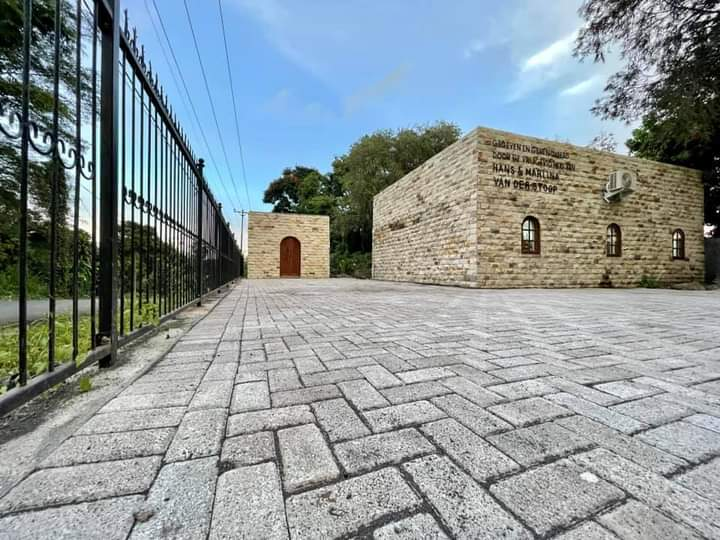
- Sha'ar Hashamayim Synagogue, the only active synagogue in Indonesia.

Total population
- 500–1,000; 3,000-4,000 (according to Yaakov Baruch)

Regions with significant populations
- North Sulawesi, Jakarta, Ambon, Jayapura

Languages
- Indonesian, Dutch, Ambonese Malay, Manado Malay, Minahasan, Portuguese, Spanish, Arabic, Hebrew

Religion
- Judaism

The history of the Jews in Indonesia began with the arrival of early European explorers and settlers, the first recorded Jews arrived in the 17th century. Most Indonesian Jews arrived from Southern Europe, the United Kingdom, the Netherlands, Belgium, Germany, France, the Middle East, North Africa, India, China, and Latin America. Jews in Indonesia presently form a very small Jewish community of about 500–1,000, from a nadir of about 20 in 1997. Judaism is not recognized as one of the country's six major religions, however its practices are allowed under Presidential Regulation No. 1 of 1965 and article 29 paragraph 2 of the Constitution of Indonesia. Therefore, members of the local Jewish community have to choose to register as "Belief in One Almighty God" (Indonesian: Kepercayaan Terhadap Tuhan Yang Maha Esa) or another recognized religions on their official identity cards.

Presently, most Indonesian Jews live in Manado on the island of Sulawesi.

== History ==
Through the writings of the traveler Abû Zayd Hasan al-Sîrafî about the Guangzhou Massacre in the An Shi Rebellion in the 7th century, it indicates that there was already a Jewish community in China, at least in Guangzhou, a port connecting China and India, trading ships for that port are thought to have passed through the islands of modern-day Indonesia. With the local climate of monsoon winds, ships had to anchor for months at various ports between the two locations, such as in the Malay Peninsula and the waters of Sumatra. A more definite picture comes from the Persian writer Buzurg ibn Shahriyar in his Aja'ib Al-Hind Barrihi wa Bahrihi wa Jaza'irihi ("Wonderful things about the land, seas, and islands of India") written in the 10th century. He wrote an Omanite Jew named Ish'âq bin al-Yahûdî who traveled to China and had stopped in Sarîra (Srivijaya). Other evidence can be seen based on the 13th Century notes of Avraham ben ha-Rambam, a Jewish leader from Cairo who issued a t’shuva for a wife who was in a position of bound, because her husband who was a trader from Aden to bilâd al-Hind (the Indies) left her and died on the way back. A thing to note is that he was a camphor trader from Fans'ûr, in Sumatra (now Barus). This indicates that there were Jews involved in trade within the Indonesian region in the past.

In the 1850s, Jewish traveler Jacob Saphir was the first to write about the Jewish community in the Dutch East Indies after visiting Batavia, Dutch East Indies. He had spoken with a local Jew who told him of about 20 Jewish families in the city and several more in Surabaya and Semarang. Most of the Jews living in the Dutch East Indies in the 19th century were Dutch Jews who worked as merchants or were affiliated with the colonial regime. Other members of the Jewish community were immigrants from Iraq or Aden which were mostly concentrated in Surabaya and Semarang.

According to the notes of Israel Cohen. Around 2,000 Jews resides in the colony prior to the second world war, several Jewish civil organizations were founded around this time, the most notable being Association for Jewish Interests in the Dutch East Indies. The World Zionist Organization also had several offices in the colony, such as in Batavia, Bandung, Malang, Medan, Padang, Semarang, dan Yogyakarta. Both organizations are known to raise funds for Zionist movements.

In 1930, a census by the colonial government recorded 1,095 Jews. By the late 1930s, the number had increased to 2,500 in Java, Sumatra, and other areas. But during the events of World War II, the number of Jews in the Dutch East Indies was estimated at 2,000. In general, Indonesian Jews (especially those of Dutch and European descent) suffered greatly under the Japanese Occupation of Indonesia, being exiled and forced to work in detention camps and having their properties confiscated by the Japanese forces.

During the Battle of Surabaya, Charles Mussry who was of Iraqi Jewish descent fought alongside the people's militias to defend Indonesia's sovereignty. After the war, the Jews who were released faced many problems and changes in the political situation in Indonesia. In the 1950s, the nationalization of several foreign companies by Sukarno, in addition to the foreign political situation such as the Israeli-Palestinian Conflict, caused a lot of Jewish emigration from Indonesia. Only a small number of these Jews returned to the Netherlands, with the majority of the Jews choosing to migrate to Australia and the United States or the newly founded Israel instead. The Jewish community in Israel who hails from the Dutch East Indies and Indonesia, founded several association organizations, the most notable being Tempo Dulu, founded by Shoshanna Lehrer.

Judaism was recognized as one of Indonesia's religion under the name Hebrani (lit. 'Hebrew'), during the Guided Demoracy period in Indonesia. Following Indonesia's transition into the New Order, this was discontinued, and Jews were categorized in the census with Christianity. Since the fall of the New Order and the beginning of the Reformation era, some Jewish descendants have begun to identify themselves and practice Judaism again, Most notably the Jewish community in North Sulawesi.

By the late 1960s, it was estimated that there were 20 Jews living in Jakarta, 25 in Surabaya and others living in Manado, East Nusa Tenggara, Maluku and Papua.

Since the 2023 Hamas-led attack on Israel, and Israel's military campaign in Gaza in the ongoing conflict, As in with most Muslim majority countries, Indonesia has seen a massive rise in antisemitism, which was already a significant problem for the majority-Muslim country. Mass protests, threats of violence and discrimination have pushed the already-marginalized and closeted Jewish population to take further steps to conceal their faith.

=== Israelitische Gemeente Soerabaia ===
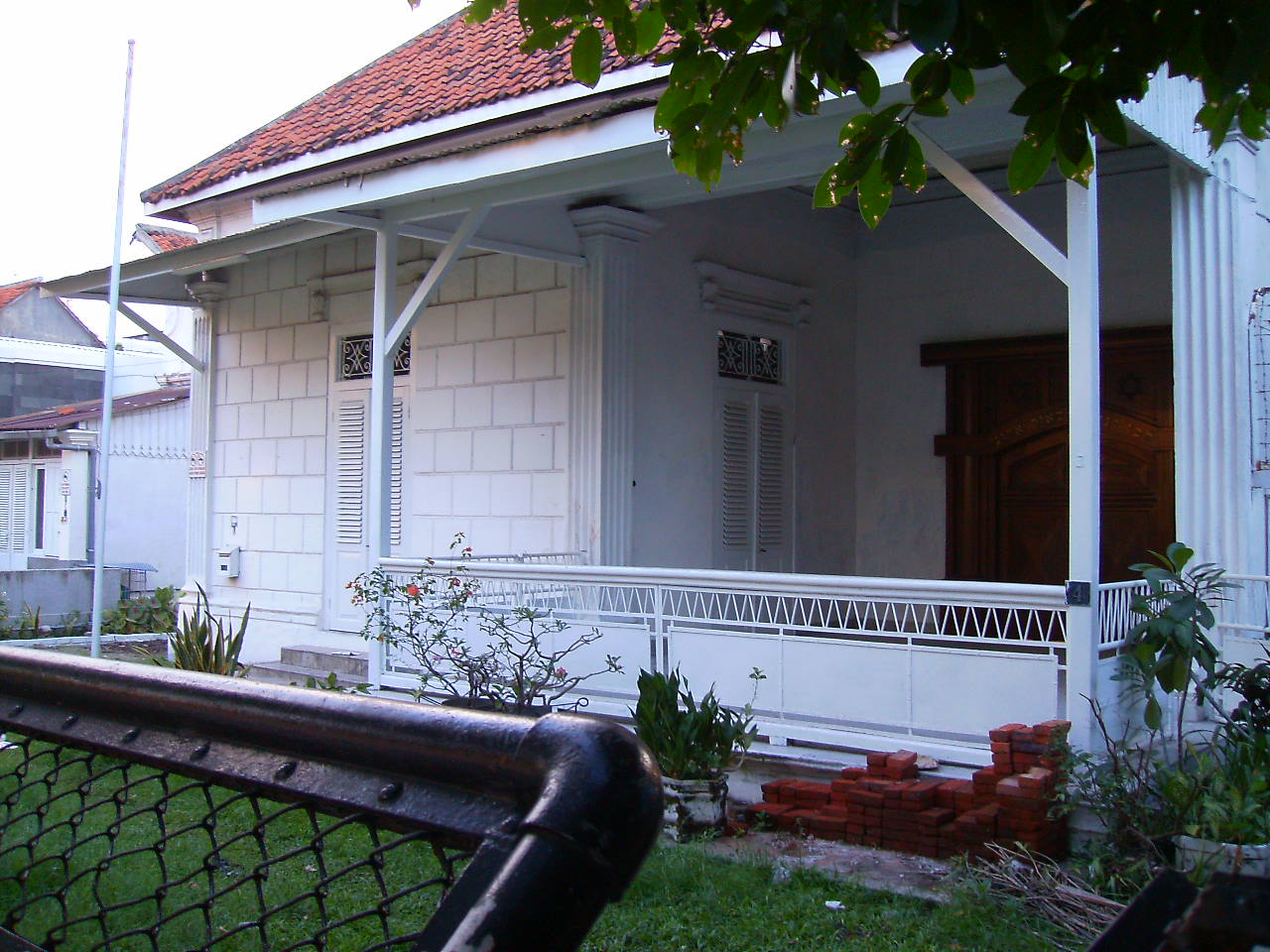
The Surabaya Synagogue in 2007

Israelitische Gemeente Soerabaia (English: Israelite Congregation in Surabaya) is a Jewish association in Surabaya which was founded in 1923. It was founded by Iraqi Jews, who have historically made up most of its membership. The congregation had what was for years the only synagogue in Indonesia. The congregation was at its largest in the 1930s, when it had around 1000 members; after most of them emigrated by 1960, it has been reduced to a tiny fraction of its former numbers.

During the Dutch colonial period, there were hundreds of Jewish immigrants living in Surabaya, most of whom worked as government employees, soldiers or merchants. Surabaya was an ideal place to live for immigrant Jews at that time because the Dutch colonial government protected and gave them civil rights without discrimination.

The Israelitische Gemeente Soerabaia was founded by Izak Ellias Binome Ehrenoreis Rechte Grunfeld and Emma Mizrahie on 31 July 1923, in Surabaya. One of the first thing it established was a Jewish cemetery in 1926, one of only a handful in the Indies. By the 1930s the congregation seems to have reached its largest extent with around 1000 members. However, during that time the congregation did not have an official synagogue space and weddings and bar mitzvahs would take place in private homes (especially that of Charles Mussry) or rented rooms in institutional buildings. The community was persecuted during the Japanese occupation of the Dutch East Indies.

After renting various rooms to use as a synagogue, the congregation bought Eigendom Verponding, an estate formerly owned by the Kruseman family in 1948 and established it as the new Surabaya Synagogue. The estate was owned by Joseph Ezra Izaak Nassiem and the operation of the synagogue was supported by the Sayers family.

Despite their purchase of a new synagogue, Jewish community in Surabaya never again reached their 1930s numbers and continued to decline in the 1950s. The congregation embraced Zionism and the newly independent state of Israel and flew Israeli flags at the opening of the building. At first there was not a local rabbi to take up a position in the synagogue; eventually Ezra Meir, a rabbi of Iraqi descent living in Singapore, was recruited to take up the role.

International and national events negatively affected the IGS and drove waves of emigration to Israel, the United States, Australia and the Netherlands throughout the 1950s. The Sinai War, Israel, the United Kingdom and France attacked Egypt to seize the Suez Canal, led to increased hostility against the Jewish community in Indonesia. However, the true end of a vibrant Jewish community in Indonesia and the steepest decline in IGS membership came about as a result of the Dutch-Indonesian dispute over Western New Guinea, which led to measures against "Dutch" people living in Indonesia and the nationalization of the property of many foreign nationals, including Dutch Jews. The membership of IGS dwindled to around 100–150 by 1959, and to only 10 or so by the twenty-first century. During that period of decline the IGS nonetheless remained the most viable Jewish congregation in the country; the Jakarta congregation essentially merged with it and the Surabaya synagogue remained the only one in operation.

Despite the emigration of many adherents, the IGS is still considered to exist among a small community of descendants of the original group in the twenty-first century. Despite the Buildings status as a "protected heritage building" The synagogue itself was sold and demolished in 2013, causing complaints from the remaining community members.

== Population ==
=== Assimilation and population changes ===
The social and cultural characteristics of Indonesia contributed to assimilation. Most Indonesian Jews changed their names to Indonesian names. Jews were obliged to change their names and beliefs. Later Chinese Indonesians were forced to change their names as well, but they were still allowed to practice Buddhism in Indonesia.

Religion in Indonesia is regulated by the government. Indonesian Jews face the challenge of declaring a religion on their government ID cards called KTP (Kartu Tanda Penduduk). Every citizen over the age of 17 must carry a KTP, which includes the holder's religion. Indonesia only recognizes six religions, none of which are Judaism. Reportedly, many Jews who have registered a religion have registered as Christians.

An estimated 20,000 descendants of Jews still live in Indonesia, though many are losing their historical identity. Since most Indonesian Jews are actually Jews from Southern Europe and the Middle East Area, the languages spoken by them include Indonesian, Malay, Arabic, Hebrew, Portuguese and Spanish.

== Synagogues ==
The Indonesian Jewish community is very tiny, with most members living in the capital of Jakarta and the rest in Surabaya. Many Jewish cemeteries still exist around the country such as in Kerkhof Cemetery in Aceh, Semarang and Surabaya in Java, in Pangkalpinang in Bangka Island, in Palembang in South Sumatra, and in North Sulawesi.

=== Torat Chaim, Jakarta ===
A small congregation led by Rabbi Tovia Singer, previously the only rabbi in present-day Indonesia. It operates in conjunction with the Eits Chaim Indonesia Foundation, the only Jewish organization in Indonesia to have official sanction, under the auspices of the Directorate General of Christian Community Guidance (Ditjen Bimas Kristen), from the Indonesian Ministry of Religious Affairs.

=== Surabaya synagogue ===
There was a synagogue in Surabaya, provincial capital of East Java in Indonesia. For many years it was the only synagogue in the country. The synagogue became inactive beginning in 2009 and had no Torah scrolls or rabbi. It was located in Jalan Kayun 6 on a 2.000 m^{2} lot near the Kali Mas river in a house built in 1939 during Dutch rule.

The home was bought by the local Jewish community from a Dutch doctor in 1948 and transformed into a synagogue. Only the mezuzah and 2 Stars of David in the entrance showed the presence of the synagogue. The community in Surabaya is no longer big enough to support a minyan, a gathering of ten men needed in order to conduct public worship. The synagogue was demolished, to its foundation, in 2013. and a hotel was built on its location.

=== Beit Torat Chaim Synagogue, Jayapura ===
A small congregation in Jayapura that built a synagogue in 2014 on a 120-meter plot of land owned by Rabbi Aharon Sharon Melamdim, the leader of the Jewish community in Jayapura. The Jews of Jayapura believed that they were the descendants of Latin American Jews who came to the Island a century prior to escape persecution and self-converted to Judaism.

=== Tondano synagogue ===
Since 2003, Shaar Hashamayim synagogue has been serving the local Jewish community of some 30-50 people in Tondano city, Minahasa Regency, North Sulawesi. Currently it is the only synagogue in Indonesia that provides services. A tiny local Jewish community remains in the area, composed mostly of those who rediscovered their ancestral roots and converted back to Judaism.

== See also ==
- List of Asian Jews
- Secular Jewish culture
- Jainism in Southeast Asia
- Hinduism in Southeast Asia
