= Surabaya Synagogue =

Former synagogue in Surabaya, Indonesia

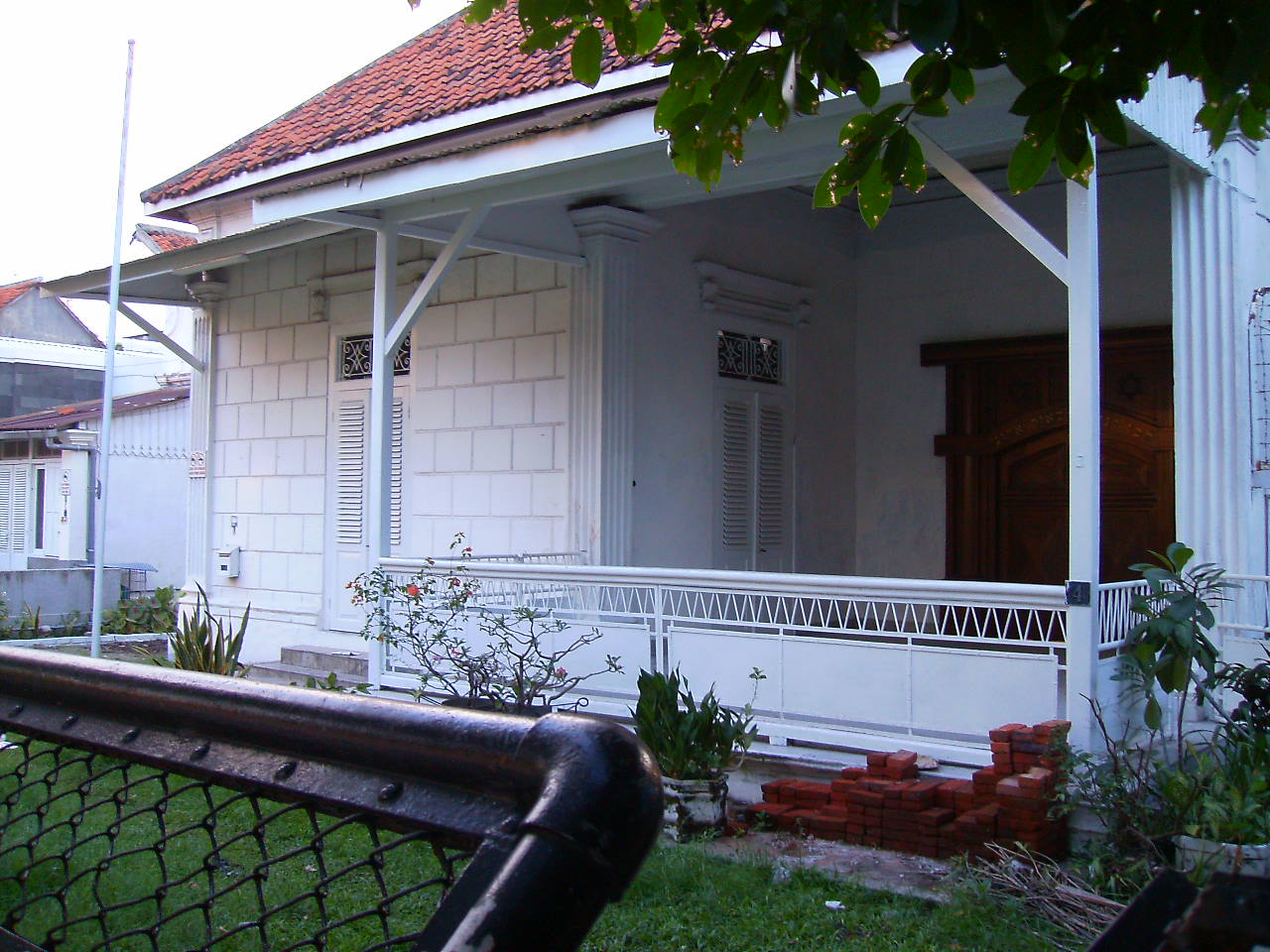
- The former house and synagogue in 2007, prior to its demolition

- Location of the demolished synagogue in Surabaya

Religion
- Affiliation: Judaism (former)
- Ecclesiastical or organisational status: Synagogue (1948–c. 2003)
- Status: Demolished

Location
- Location: 4–6 Kajoon Street, Surabaya, East Java
- Country: Indonesia
- Coordinates: 7°16′00″S 112°44′57″E

Architecture
- Type: Private residence
- Style: Old Indies Style
- Established: 1923 (as a congregation)
- Completed: 1939 (as a house); 1948 (as a synagogue)
- Demolished: 2013

The Surabaya Synagogue, officially the Beth Shalom Synagogue, was a former Jewish congregation and synagogue, located in Surabaya, East Java, Indonesia. It is generally said to have been the only synagogue in the country during the years it operated, although since then Sha'ar Hashamayim has opened in Sulawesi.

The Surabaya Synagogue building was a former private residence purchased by the Israelitische Gemeente Soerabaia congregation in 1948. Due to world events and Indonesian politics, most of the congregation emigrated in the decade after it opened. The building continued to be used by a tiny community and fell into disrepair by the late twentieth century; it was controversially demolished in 2013 despite receiving some recognition as a heritage building.

== History ==
=== Establishment ===
Although there had been a Jewish presence in Java and in Surabaya throughout the Dutch East Indies era, it was only in 1923 that a group of Iraqi Jews established the Israelitische Gemeente Soerabaia (Surabaya Israelite Congregation, Indonesian: Jemaat Israel di Surabaya), the first organized Jewish congregation in the city. The new congregation's synagogue in 1923 merely consisted of a rented room. Many of these Iraqi Jews had emigrated from the Netherlands or directly from Iraq to work in Surabaya as government officials, soldiers, or businesspeople. The congregation began to establish community institutions, and in 1926 established a Jewish cemetery which was one of only a handful in the Indies. Prior to the establishment of the IGS, Jewish Surabayans had a high level of intermarriage with little organized religious activity; the new organization soon incorporated both Sephardic and Ashkenazic Jews from a wide variety of backgrounds. During the 1930s a number of stateless Eastern European Jewish refugees also joined the congregation; it was during this period that the congregation reached its largest numbers, approximately 1,000 people.

The congregation continued to rent private rooms to use as the synagogue and weddings and bar mitzvahs would often take place in private homes (especially that of businessman Charles Mussry). World War II was very difficult on the Surabaya Jewish community as they were interned in concentration camps by the Japanese along with most other Europeans in the Indies. Dutch and Iraqi Jews were treated differently by the Japanese; the Dutch ones were immediately interned in 1942 along with almost all Europeans, whereas Iraqis were allowed to remain free until 1943 when a visiting German delegation insisted they be detained as well.

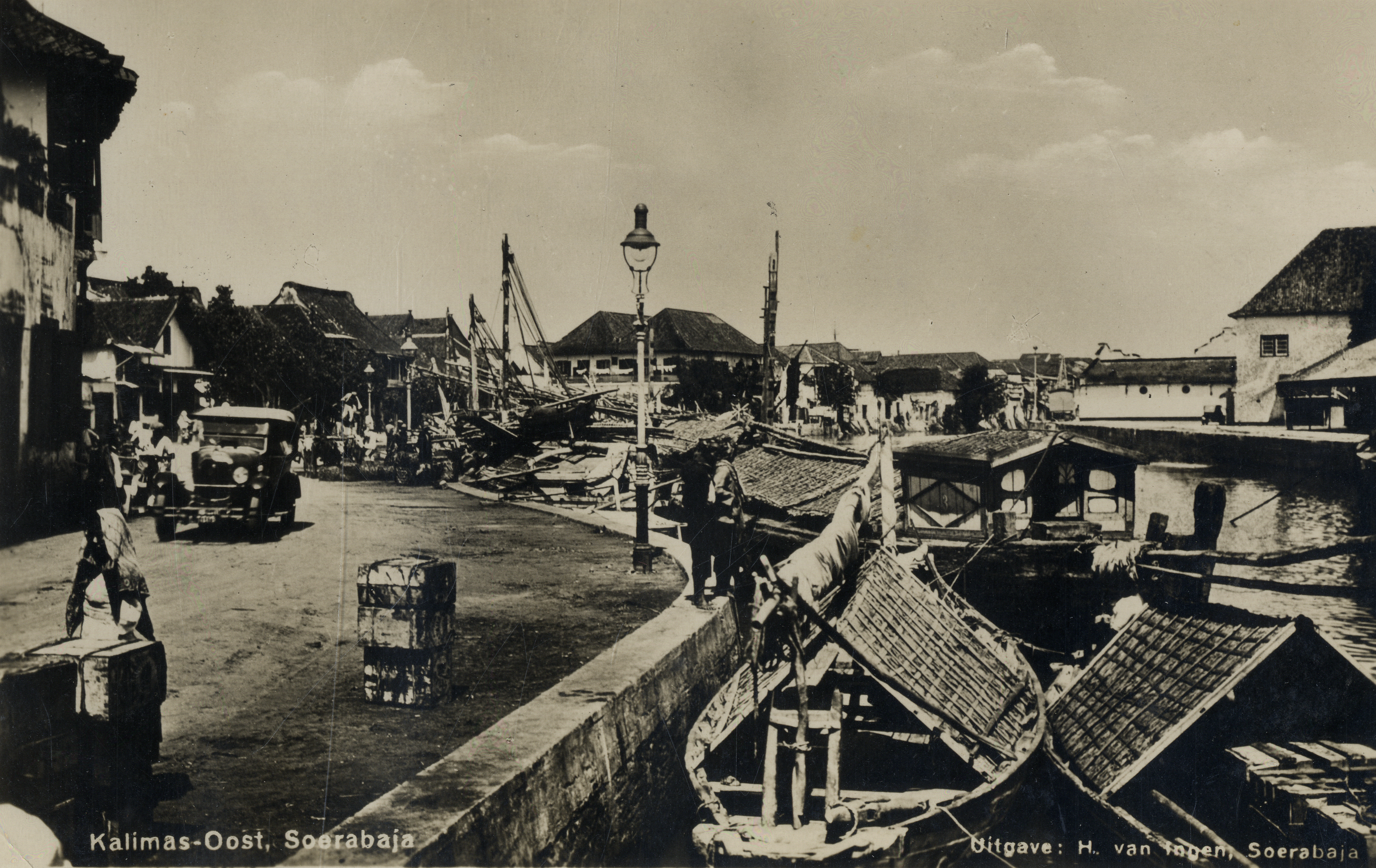
A street scene in Surabaya near the Mas river, 1930s

After the end of the war, the congregation reconstituted itself and in 1948 bought a private home belonging to the Kruseman family, located at 4–6 Kajoon Street by the Mas River, to act as a permanent home for the synagogue. The house was fairly new; it had only been built in 1939. According to descriptions it was a fairly humble site, sandwiched behind other buildings. The synagogue land was owned by Joseph Ezra Izaak Nassiem and the operation of the synagogue was supported by the Sayers family. The congregation embraced Zionism and the newly independent state of Israel and flew Israeli flags at the opening of the building; many of the Iraqi Jewish members, who could not return to Iraq and had no ties to Holland turned to Israel. At first there was not a local rabbi to take up a position in the synagogue; eventually Ezra Meir, a rabbi of Iraqi descent living in Singapore, was recruited to take up the role on a part time basis.

=== Demise ===
However, despite the opening of the new building, the Jewish community in Surabaya was already declining in numbers and this affected the use of the synagogue. In the decade after it opened, the majority of the Jewish community in Surabaya emigrated to Israel, Singapore, the Netherlands, Australia or the United States. A large group left for Israel during 1948–50, and after that there was a steady emigration for various reasons including hostilities against Jews as a result of the Suez Crisis, or the Indonesian claim over Western New Guinea, which led to measures against foreign nationals living in Indonesia. Other former community members converted to Islam and assumed Indonesian citizenship. The membership dwindled to around 100–150 by 1959, 60 people by 1965, and around eight families which continued to attend the synagogue by 1970. During that period of decline the Surabaya community remained the most viable one in the country; the Jakarta congregation essentially merged with it and the Surabaya synagogue remained the only one in operation. After 1991, a member of the Sayers family was appointed caretaker of the building. In the 1990s families from Jakarta still traveled to Surabaya to hold events, such as Bar Mitzvahs, at the synagogue. By 2003 there were only three local families (around 20 people) who still used it and held holiday events in the synagogue, although not weekly services. At that time a member of the Sayers family, Rivka, lived in the synagogue building.

=== Demolition ===
In its final years the synagogue building gained some official recognition but also became the target of political demonstrations against the state of Israel. During the Gaza War (2008–2009), there were demonstrations by Islamic groups in front of the building who forcibly closed it. For that, the Jewish community gained some support and attention from the Ministry of Religious Affairs as well as by local politicians and activists who insisted that the city should be religiously tolerant. Also in 2009, the synagogue building was considered by the Surabaya Department of City Culture and Tourism as a potential cultural landmark (Indonesian: Bangunan Cagar Budaya). However, despite appearing on that list identified by officials, it was not protected from eventual demolition. It continued to be the focus of anti-Israel demonstrations; in March 2010 a student group attempted to raise a Palestinian flag over the building, but were prevented from doing so by the police.

The ownership of the building became the subject of a police complaint in 2011; it was alleged that Sayers, the official caretaker, was living in Israel and planning to sell off the building despite not being the legal owner. In 2013, the building was again the focus of protests by Islamic groups over the Gaza-Israel conflict. That same year a real estate developer purchased and demolished the building. Members of the Jewish community in Surabaya, as well as heritage groups like Sjarikat Poesaka Soerabaia (Heritage Union Surabaya) reported the demolition to the city and police department, but did not get a clear response as to why it had been allowed to happen. An unsuccessful lawsuit was filed against the mayor and others over the sale and demolition in 2015–6, and the demolition and lack of respect for heritage buildings was publicly criticized by deputy Surabaya mayor Armuji in 2017. Nonetheless the new hotel was built and opened in 2018.

== Other Jewish congregations in Indonesia ==
In 2019, the Sha'ar Hashamayim Synagogue opened in Tondano, North Sulawesi. The Sephardic synagogue is the only active synagogue in Indonesia.

== See also ==
- History of the Jews in Indonesia
- Israelitische Gemeente Soerabaia
- List of synagogues in Indonesia
