= Manado City Regional House of Representatives =

Manado City Regional House of Representatives Dewan Perwakilan Rakyat Daerah Kota Manado
- 2024–2029 period

Type
- Type: Unicameral

History
- Founded: 1959
- New session started: 14 August 2024

Leadership
- Speaker: Dra. Aaltje Dondokambey, M.Kes, Apt., PDI-P since 12 September 2024
- Deputy Speaker: Mona Claudya Kloer, S.H., M.H., Gerindra since 12 September 2024
- Deputy Speaker: Meykel Damopolii, Golkar since 7 October 2024

Structure
- Seats: 40
- Political groups: Government (20) PDI-P (16) Perindo (2) PKS (2) Others (20) Gerindra (6) Golkar (5) Democratic (5) NasDem (2) PSI (1) PAN (1)
- Length of term: 5 years

Elections
- Voting system: Open list proportional representation
- Last election: 14 February 2024

Meeting place
- Manado City Regional House of Representatives Building; Balai Kota Street Number 1 Tikala Ares, Tikala, Manado; North Sulawesi, Indonesia

The Manado City Regional House of Representatives (Indonesian: Dewan Perwakilan Rakyat Daerah Kota Manado, DPRD Kota Manado) is the unicameral municipal legislature of Manado, North Sulawesi, Indonesia. It has 40 members, who are elected every five years, simultaneously with the national legislative election.

== Legal basis ==
The legislature for Manado was formed along with those of other cities in North Sulawesi under Law Number 29 of 1959, which organized city governments within the province.

== General election results ==
=== 2024 Indonesian legislative election ===
The official valid votes received by political parties contesting the 2024 Indonesian legislative election in each electoral district (constituency) for members of the Manado City Regional House of Representatives are as follows.

2024 Indonesian legislative election results

Electoral district	PKB	Gerindra	PDI-P	Golkar	NasDem	Labour	Gelora	PKS	PKN	Hanura	Garuda	PAN	PBB	Democratic	PSI	Perindo	PPP	Ummat	Valid votes
Manado City 1	152	6,128	19,437	6,094	2,072	105	92	2,055	10	2,564	64	535	48	5,414	4,906	3,558	84	13	53,331
Manado City 2	138	4,257	22,044	5,042	2,608	128	46	2,131	6	1,224	114	407	29	6,095	1,890	2,626	42	9	48,836
Manado City 3	331	9,367	15,520	2,863	5,627	208	85	5,020	4	385	16	4,619	946	2,209	485	1,341	556	22	49,604
Manado City 4	1,245	5,009	27,881	8,131	5,387	254	111	3,348	33	1,024	43	2,762	579	4,260	2,160	3,280	1,025	16	66,548
Manado City 5	421	4,804	11,023	8,570	2,027	135	61	2,092	7	257	17	1,721	2,087	6,641	1,750	1,399	117	10	43,139
Total	2,287	29,565	95,905	30,700	17,721	830	395	14,646	60	5,454	254	10,044	3,689	24,619	11,191	12,204	1,824	70	261,458
Source: General Elections Commission of Indonesia

== Composition ==
The following is the composition of members of the Manado City Regional House of Representatives in the last three periods.

Party	Term of period		
Party	2014–2019	2019–2024	2024–2029
Gerindra seats	5	▼4	▲6
PDI-P seats	6	▲10	▲16
Golkar seats	5	5	5
NasDem seats	3	▲5	▼2
PKS seats	2	2	2
Hanura seats	4	▼1	▼0
PAN seats	4	4	▼1
Democratic seats	9	▼6	▼5
PSI seats		1	1
Perindo seats		2	2
PPP seats	1	▼0	0
PKPI seats	1	▼0	
Total Seats	40	40	40
Total Party	10	10	▼9

== Electoral District ==
In the 2019 Legislative Election, the Manado City Regional House of Representatives election was divided into 5 electoral districts as follows:

Electoral District Name	Electoral District Area	Number of Seats
MANADO CITY 1	Paal Dua, Tikala	7
MANADO CITY 2	Wenang, Wanea	9
MANADO CITY 3	Malalayang, Sario	8
MANADO CITY 4	Bunaken, Bunaken Kepulauan, Tuminting	7
MANADO CITY 5	Mapanget, Singkil	9
TOTAL		40

In the 2024 Legislative Election, the Manado City Regional House of Representatives election was divided into 5 electoral districts as follows:

Electoral District Name	Electoral District Area	Number of Seats
MANADO CITY 1	Wenang, Wanea	8
MANADO CITY 2	Sario, Malalayang	7
MANADO CITY 3	Bunaken, Tuminting, Bunaken Kepulauan	8
MANADO CITY 4	Singkil, Mapanget	10
MANADO CITY 5	Tikala, Paal Dua	7
TOTAL		40

== See also ==
- Manado
- North Sulawesi
