= Christ Blessing =

Statue in Manado, Indonesia

- Yesus Memberkati
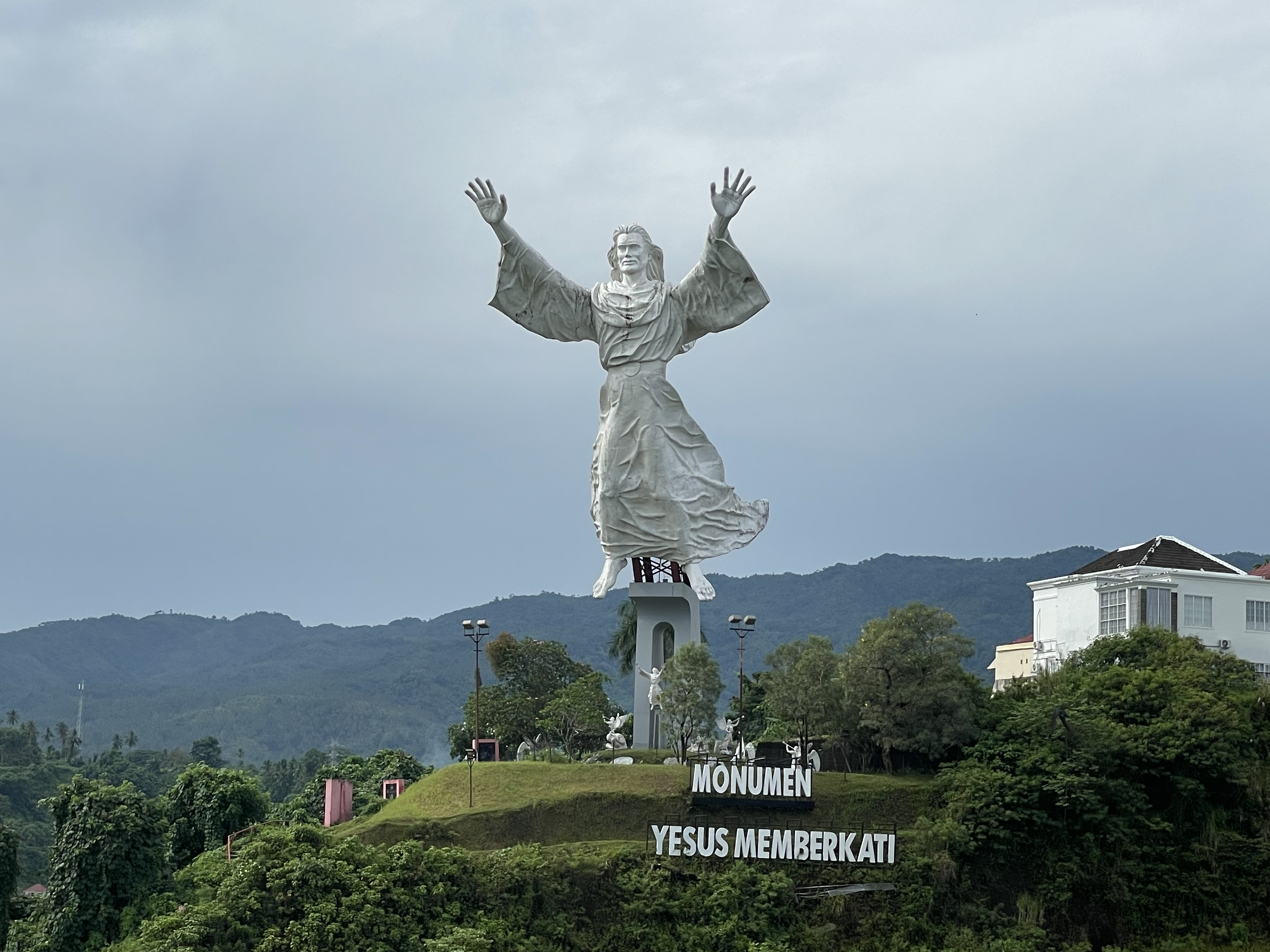
- Yesus Kase Berkat statue at Manado, North Sulawesi, Indonesia
- Interactive map of Christ Blessing
- Location: Manado, Indonesia
- Coordinates: 01°26′18″N 124°50′52″E
- Material: Soapstone
- Height: 30 metres (98 ft) (statue); 50 metres (160 ft) (with pedestal)
- Completion date: 2010

Jesus Blesses or Christ Blessing (in Manado language is Yesus Kase Berkat or Kristus Kase Berkat) is a statue of Jesus Christ in Manado, North Sulawesi, Indonesia. The structure stands 50 metres (158.3 feet) tall and consists of 20 metres of pedestal and 30 metres of statue. It is made of 25 tonnes of metal fibre and 35 tonnes of steel, and is located at the peak of the Citraland residential estate.

== History ==
The idea came from Ciputra, an Indonesian real estate developer, when he and his wife stood where the statue is now. The statue was built for Manado and North Sulawesi society and to worship God. The construction took nearly three years by the Yogyakarta Engineer. The monument cost was five billion rupiah (about 540,000 dollars). The statue is inaugurated in 2017 by Sinyo Harry Sarundajang, the governor of North Sulawesi. The statue is designed to face towards the office of the governor of the province.

This statue has a declivity 35 degree and is made from fiber and steel and became the "first tallest flying statue in the world."

Surrounding the statue, four statues are placed with each one having text describing the suffering of the people of Manado during World War II. The depiction of the suffering merchant matches the image of Ciputra's father, who was captured in 1944 in Bumbulan and taken to Manado. The statues are made from two solid blocks of stone from the Cilwung River in Bogor. The four statues were made by Bernard Los in Bogor for a planned monument to the people of Manado, but this was not realized due to political changes in 1949. The statues were neglected for 55 years before being bought by Ciputra and placed at the foot of Christ Blessing.

== See also ==
- List of statues of Jesus
- List of tallest statues
