= Sha'ar Hashamayim Synagogue (Tondano) =

Synagogue in North Sulawesi, Indonesia

Sha'ar Hashamayim Synagogue (Ohel Yaakov Synagogue)
- Hebrew: בית כנסת שער השמים
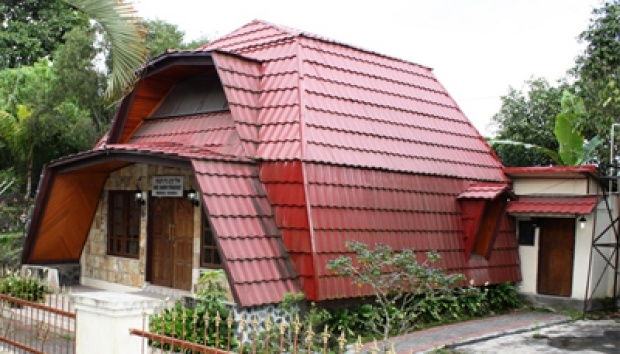
- The synagogue in 2011

- Location of the synagogue in Sulawesi

Religion
- Affiliation: Orthodox Judaism
- Rite: Nusach Sefard
- Ecclesiastical or organisational status: Synagogue
- Leadership: Rabbi Yaakov Baruch
- Year consecrated: 2019
- Status: Active

Location
- Location: Tondano, Minahasa Regency, North Sulawesi
- Country: Indonesia
- Administration: Dutch: Israelitische Gemeente Indonesie
- Coordinates: 1°18′29″N 124°54′27″E

Architecture
- Type: Private residence
- Established: 2003 (as a congregation)
- Completed: 1996 (as a house); 2004 (as a synagogue)

Specifications
- Interior area: 7 m × 15 m (23 ft × 49 ft)
- Site area: 400 m^{2} (4,300 sq ft)

The Sha'ar Hashayamim Synagogue (Hebrew: בית הכנסת שער השמים, romanized: Beit HaKnesset Sha'ar HaShayamim, lit. 'Gate of Heaven Synagogue') (Note: Also known as Hebrew: קהל קדוש שער השמים, romanized: Kahal Kadosh Sha'ar Hashamayim, lit. 'Gate of Heaven Congregation.') is an Orthodox Jewish congregation and synagogue, located in Tondano, North Sulawesi, Indonesia. The synagogue was previously known as the Ohel Yaakov Synagogue.

The Spanish and Portuguese Sephardic congregation was founded in 2003 by Rabbi Yaakov Baruch, who also leads the congregation. A house was converted into a synagogue in 2004 and the synagogue was consecrated in September 2019.

== History ==
Initially, Jews in Manado had to move around when they wanted to worship by renting a building in the city.

In 2003, the congregation acquired a two-story house that was built on the main street in 1996, by Leo Elias van Beugen. (Note: van Beugen was the uncle of Rabbi Yaakov Baruch.) The house was bought by J. P. van der Stoop and his family, from The Netherlands, and given to the Jewish community in Indonesia so that they would have a place to worship. The synagogue opened on September 17, 2004 and was initially called the Ohel Yaakov Synagogue (Hebrew: אוהל יעקב, lit. 'Jacob's Tent'; Indonesian: Sinagoge Ohel Yaakov).

Once established, the synagogue was busy with guests from outside the city and abroad. The synagogue was renovated in 2009, to coincide with the World Ocean Conference which was held in Manado. At the event, Jewish guests were directed to the synagogue in Tondano to worship. In 2009, the regional governments of North Sulawesi and Minahasa helped renovate the building and pave the road in front of the synagogue.

== Site features ==
The synagogue stands on 400 m^{2} (4,300 sq ft) of land and the building area is 7 m × 15 m (23 ft × 49 ft). The synagogue complex includes a mikveh, a guest room for visiting rabbis, and a Holocaust museum.

The Sha'ar Hashamayim Synagogue is the second synagogue in Indonesia after another synagogue in the city of Surabaya, which was built in 1939 by the Iraqi Jewish community, and demolished in 2013.

As of 2019, the Sha'ar Hashamayim Synagogue was the only active synagogue in Indonesia.

== Gallery ==
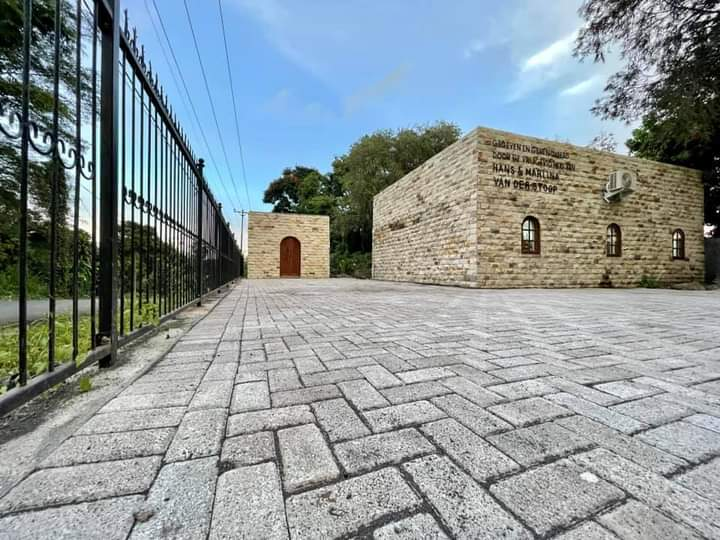
The mikveh (left), and the synagogue (right)

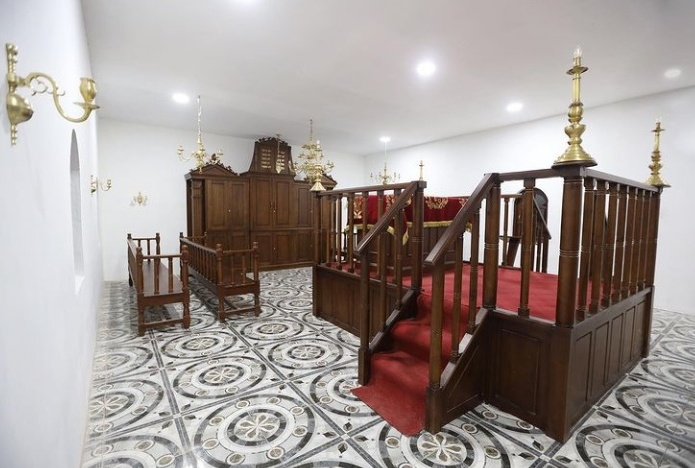
Synagogue interior

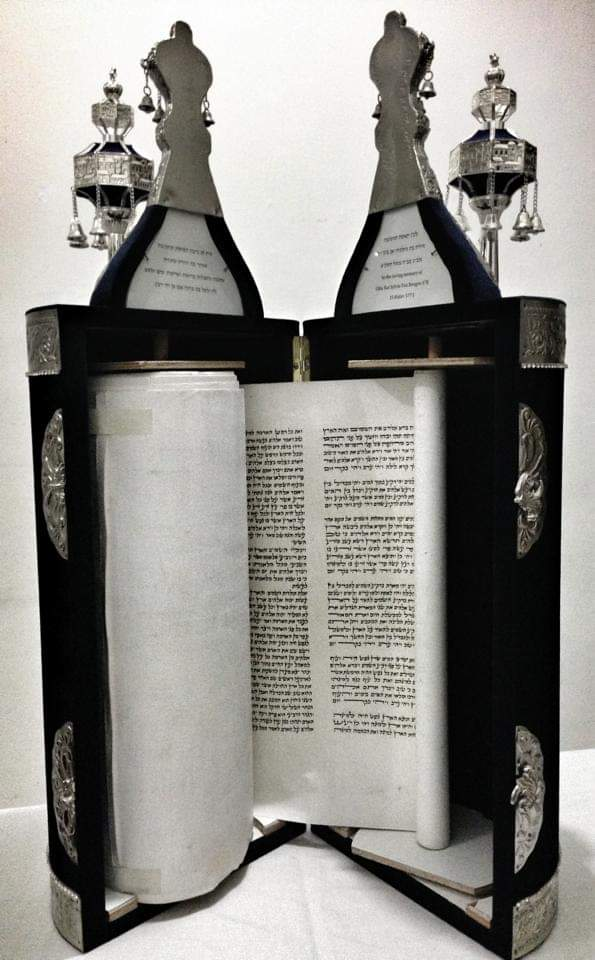
Torah scroll, gift from Ben Judah's Jewish family

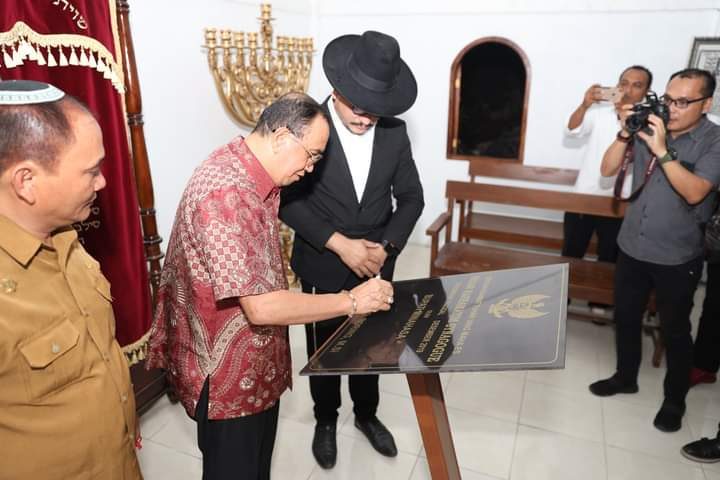
Synagogue inauguration by local government, 2019

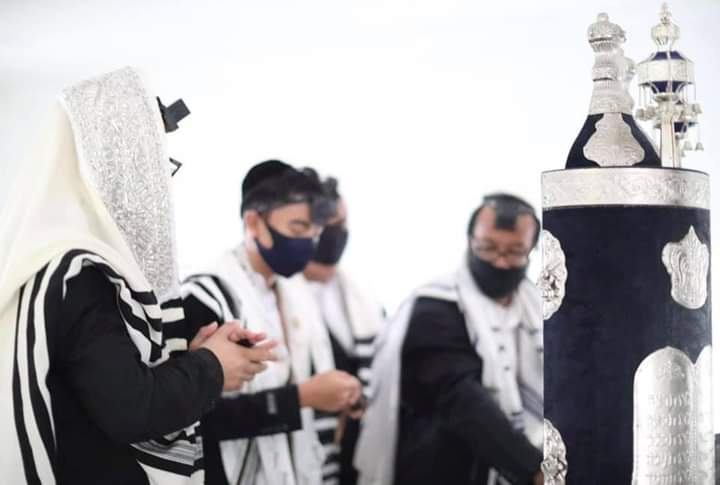
Recitation of Sefer Torah by Congregation of Sha'ar Hashamayim

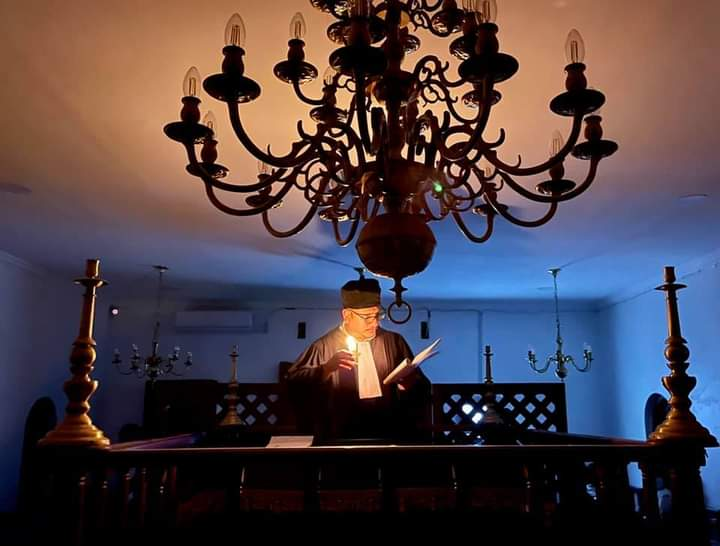
Recitation of Lamentations on the night of Tisha B'av

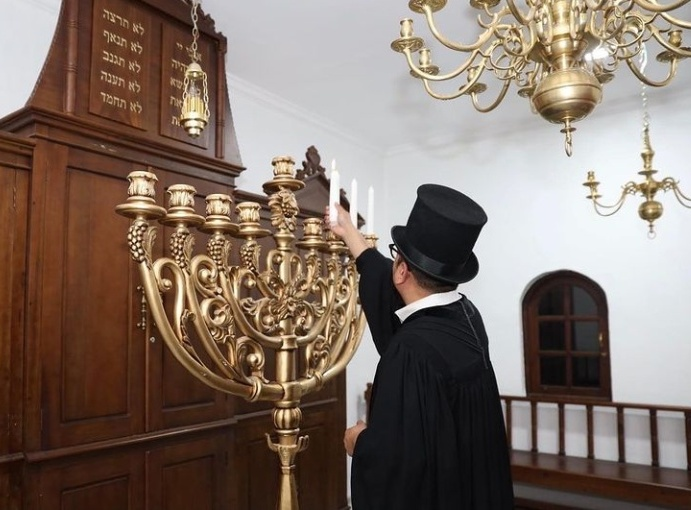
Hanukkah celebration

== See also ==
- History of the Jews in Indonesia
