= Yaakov Baruch =

Rabbi of the Sha'ar Hashamayim Synagogue

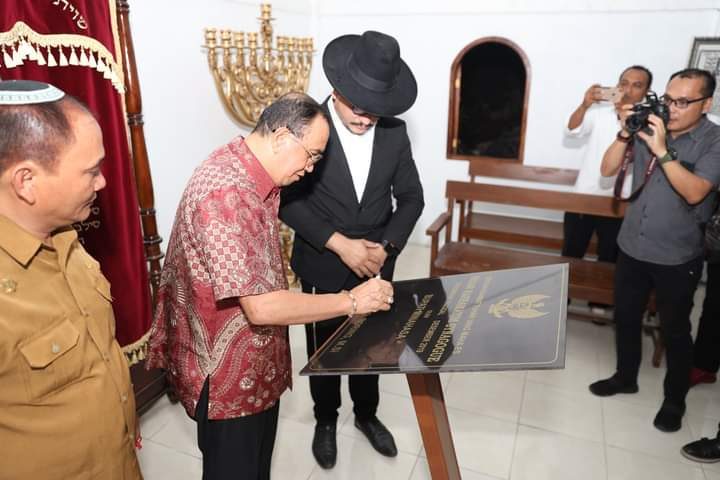
- Yaakov Baruch attends the inauguration of the Synagogue by the local government, 2019.

Personal life
- Born: Yaakov Baruch Palilingan; 14 November 1982 (age 43)
- Parent(s): Toar Palilingan (father); Cili Damapolii (mother)
- Occupation: Rabbi

Religious life
- Religion: Judaism
- Synagogue: Sha'ar Hashamayim Synagogue

Yaakov Baruch (born 14 November 1982) is a leading Rabbi of the Sha'ar Hashamayim Synagogue, located in Tondano, Minahasa Regency, North Sulawesi.

== Biography ==
Yaakov Baruch was born and raised in a different religious family. Since childhood, his parents have instilled religious values in him. His father was a Minahasan Protestant and his late mother was a Mongondow Muslim. Since childhood, he has been accustomed to living in a family of different faiths, upholding the values of tolerance.

Yaakov Baruch decided to convert to Judaism after his mother's next-door grandmother told him that he had Jewish ancestry. When Yaakov Baruch decided to embrace Judaism, the religion of his ancestors, there was no opposition at all from his parents. "There is no problem, we can accept each other," he told tribunmanado.co.id, in 2018.

At that time he was in junior high school. Yaakov Baruch then traced his family tree and found out that he had Jewish ancestry.

His great-grandfather from his mother's line was Elias van Beugen who was a Dutch Jewish immigrant.

Apart from being a rabbi, he is also a lecturer at Faculty of Law Sam Ratulangi University, majoring in international law and international humanitarian law.

Baruch's son, Levi Baruch, had his Bar Mitzvah in 2025 at Jerusalem.
