= South Likupang =

District in North Minahasa, North Sulawesi, Indonesia

South Likupang (Likupang Selatan) is a district in North Minahasa Regency, North Sulawesi Province, Indonesia with a population of 4,958.

The villages of Batu, Kaweruan, Kokoleh I, Kokoleh II, Paslaten, Wangurer and Werot fall within the district boundaries.

== See also ==
- West Likupang
- East Likupang
