= SIG (company) =

Indonesian state-owned cement company

PT Semen Indonesia (Persero) Tbk

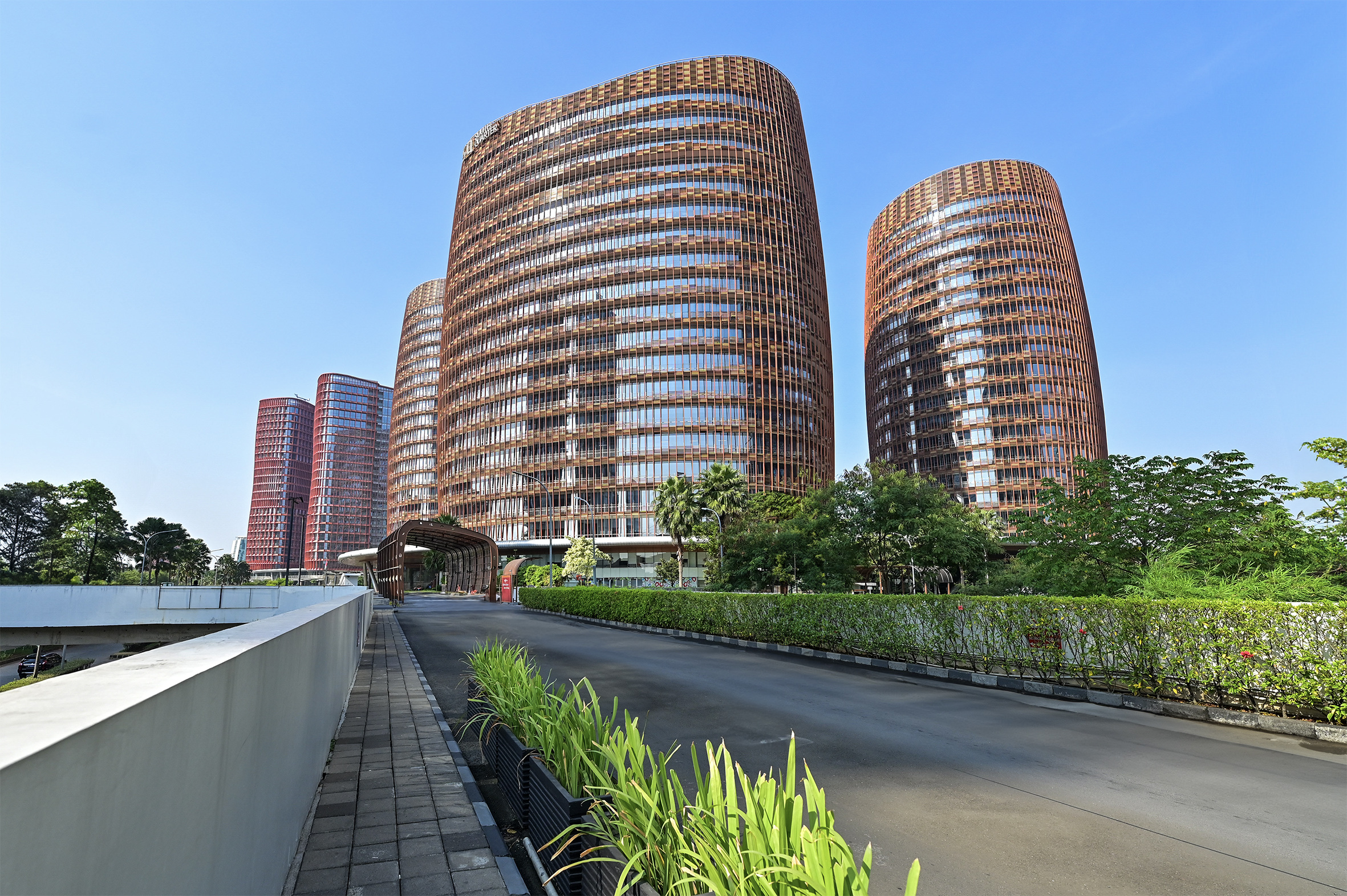
- South Quarter in Cilandak, South Jakarta, Jakarta; where SIG headquarter is located
- Trade name: SIG
- Type: Public
- Traded as: IDX: SMGR
- Industry: Building materials
- Founded: 7 of August 1957 (as PT Semen Gresik (Persero) Tbk); 7 of January 2013 (as PT Semen Indonesia (Persero) Tbk)
- Headquarters: Jakarta, Indonesia
- Key people: Donny Arsal (President Director); Budi Waseso (President Commissioner)
- Products: Cement; Concrete; Mortar; Concrete; Aggregate
- Services: Construction and Manufacturing; Logistics; Mining; Trading; Waste Processing; Property; Industrial Estates; Waste Management; Information Technology Service Management
- Owner: Government of Indonesia (51,20%); Public (48,80%)
- Subsidiaries: See subsidiaries
- Website: sig.id

PT Semen Indonesia (Persero) Tbk (SIG) is a state-owned holding company providing building material solutions. The company has 17 subsidiaries located in Indonesia and Vietnam. With a market reach to Asia, Australia and Oceania, the company's main business is in the cement sector and its derivative products such as concrete, mortar, precast, and aggregate.

In running its main business process, the company has supporting business lines such as construction and manufacturing services, land and sea transportation services, industrial packaging provider, mining services, international trade service, and building material solution applications. In addition, through several subsidiaries and business units, the company also does business in property, industrial estate management, industrial waste management, informatics solutions, and health services.

== History ==
The company began its history in 1953, when the Indonesian Government established the legal entity N.V. Pabrik Semen Gresik with an installed capacity of 250,000 tons of cement per year. In 1957, President Sukarno inaugurated the company's cement plant. In 1961, the government changed the company's legal entity into a state-owned company under the name PN Semen Gresik. In 1969, on various considerations, the company's legal entity status was changed to a limited liability company.

In 1991, the company was officially listed on the Jakarta Stock Exchange and Surabaya Stock Exchange. At that time, the installed capacity of the company had reached 1.8 million tons of cement per year. In 1995, the company acquired PT Semen Padang and PT Semen Tonasa, bringing its installed capacity to 8.5 million tons of cement per year. In 1998, CEMEX officially held 14% of the company's shares, which was increased to 25.5% a year later. In 2006, Blue Valley Holdings purchased 24.9% of the company's shares held by CEMEX, and sold them four years later.

In 2012, the company acquired Thang Long Cement Joint Stock Company in Vietnam, which had an installed capacity of 2.3 million tons of cement per year at the time. In 2013, the company transformed into a strategic holding company and changed its name to what it is today, and separated its cement production business to PT Semen Gresik.

In 2019, through Semen Indonesia Industri Bangunan, the company acquired 80.64% of PT Holcim Indonesia Tbk shares owned by Holderfin B.V. and then changed the name from PT Holcim Indonesia Tbk to PT Solusi Bangun Indonesia Tbk. Holcim's product brand was also changed to Dynamix. In 2020, the company changed its trade name and logo from Semen Indonesia to SIG, emphasizing the company's vision as a building material solutions provider. In 2021, SIG entered into a strategic partnership with Taiheiyo Cement Corporation which officially holds 15.04% shares of Solusi Bangun Indonesia. In 2022, as a part of SOE cement subcluster integration, the Government of Indonesia transferred the ownership of shares in PT Semen Baturaja Tbk to SIG, making it officially part of SIG.

== Products ==
=== Bagged Cement ===
A wide selection of bagged green cement brands supported by 385 distributors and more than 70,000 retail stores across Indonesia.

=== Portland Composite Cement (PCC) ===
Environmentally friendly multi purpose cement for general construction, housing, and concrete block wall panel applications.

The PCC products are offered by SIG under various brands, such as:

- Semen Gresik
- Semen Padang
- Semen Tonasa
- Dynamix
- Semen Andalas
- Semen Kujang
- Semen Baturaja
- Semen Merdeka
- Thang Long Cement (Vietnam)
- Special Application Cement
- Dynamix Extra Power: special cement for structural applications such as precast concrete, prestressed concrete, concrete roads, as well as residential or building structural works.
- Dynamix Masonry: special cement for non-structural applications such as brick and ceramic masonry, plastering, finishing, profiles and corners.

=== Bulk Cement ===
- EzPro: multifunctional cement
- PwrPro: extra strong cement
- MaxStrength: cement for mass casting and soil stabilization
- Dupro+ SBC: seawater resistant cement
- DuPro+ LH: acid and salt resistant cement
- DuPro+ HSR: cement for extreme environments
- Dupro+ MSR: cement for seaside construction
- UltraPro: cement with optimum strength
- SprintPro: cement with maximum strength
- SuperTermo: special cement for oil and gas drilling

=== Concrete ===
A wide selection of concrete products supported by batching plants spread across project sites in Indonesia[11].

- Ready Mix Concrete: ready-to-use normal concrete
- ThruCrete: high absorbency concrete as a solution for flooded roads
- DekoCrete: decorative concrete
- SpeedCrete: quick-drying concrete
- LocooCrete: concrete for general applications
- ComfilPlas: applied concrete with lightweight materials
- OptimaCrete: high strength concrete
- StilCrete: sulfate and chloride resistant concrete
- AeerCrete: concrete for underwater casting
- SupeCrete: quick-drying concrete with high early strength
- EzyfloCrete: self-compacting concrete
- ApexCrete: special application concrete for super flat floor
- MiniMix: mini truck for transporting ready mix concrete

=== Mortar ===
- D-1 Light Brick Adhesive
- D-2 Brick & Plaster Adhesive
- D-3 Plaster & Concrete Coating
- K-1 Ceramic Adhesive
- K-2 Granite Adhesive
- K-3 Ceramic on Ceramic Adhesive
- K-4 Submerged Area Ceramic Adhesive
- KN-1 Basic Ceramic Grout
- KN-2 Premium Ceramic Grout
- L-1 Floor Adhesive
- ADV-1 Concrete Surface Repair

=== Precast Concrete ===
Available in various variants that have met the standards of ASTM C 150-94, SNI 03-6468-2000, and PBI 1971 Ν.Ι.-2.

- Canal U
- Girder
- Square pile
- Spun pile
- Box culvert
- Sheet pile
- Slab
- Railway sleeper
- Other custom precast products

=== Non cement ===
- Paving Porous

An innovative solution for flooded areas by absorbing water into the layers below for reducing surface run-off.

- Precise Interlock Brick

An environmentally friendly housebuilding technology that is specially designed with a locking system to each other, to build building structures faster, more economically, precisely, and earthquake-resistant.

=== Other Materials ===
- Aggregate
- Ground Granulated Blast Furnace Slag (GGBFS)

== Services ==
=== Construction and Manufacturing Services ===
Complete solutions for construction business including technical and non-technical services, ranging from civil construction, fabrication, mechanical and electrical, as well as heavy construction equipment rental.

=== Land and Sea Transportation Services ===
Integrated transportation and logistics services by land and sea, serving the distribution of industrial products ranging from cement, gypsum, tras, coal, fabricated goods, hazardous waste, paper, iron, cement board, and others.

=== Industrial Packaging Provider ===
Provider of cement bags and other industrial packaging, especially those using kraft paper and PP Woven materials such as chemicals, animal feed, charcoal, food ingredients, and other packaging needs.

=== Mining Services ===
Having a mining services business in order to ensure the availability of mining raw material supplies to support productivity and smooth production processes. As well as serving heavy equipment rentals in various sectors such as road infrastructure, mining, and others.

=== International Trade Services ===
Provides building materials and other industrial products in regional and international markets that have reached export markets in Asia, Australia and Oceania.

=== Digital Solutions ===
- SobatBangun: an integrated online platform with various services for housebuilding or renovation, including design (architects), builders (contractors), construction and home furnishing, and financing options.
- AksesToko: an online platform to support the business growth of the company's distributors and retail stores.

=== Industrial Estate Management ===
Provides rental and sales services for industrial land, factory buildings, warehouse, and business and property centers, complete with supporting facilities and infrastructure.

=== Property Provider ===
Property and asset management solutions, through the development of landed house, apartments, integrated commercial areas, as well as the hospitality sector in the form of conference halls, meeting rooms, lodging, catering, and tourism.

=== Industrial Waste Management ===
Provides environmentally friendly and sustainable industrial waste management solutions with a range of services, from waste analysis, waste handling and transportation at customer's location, waste mapping and consultation, to waste preparation and disposal.

=== Informatics Solution Provider ===
Digital technology services to meet the needs of digital development and effectiveness of business process management.

== Subsidiaries ==
By the end of 2023, SIG has 17 subsidiaries, namely:

1. PT Semen Padang
2. PT Semen Gresik
3. PT Semen Tonasa
4. PT Semen Baturaja Tbk
5. PT Solusi Bangun Indonesia Tbk
6. Thang Long Cement JSC
7. PT Semen Indonesia Beton
8. PT Sinergi Mitra Investama
9. PT United Tractors Semen Gresik
10. PT Industri Kemasan Semen Gresik
11. PT Semen Kupang Indonesia
12. PT Semen Indonesia Industri Bangunan
13. PT Semen Indonesia Aceh
14. PT Sinergi Informatika Semen Indonesia
15. PT Semen Indonesia International
16. PT Semen Indonesia Logistik
17. PT Kawasan Industri Gresik

== Manufacturing and Distribution ==
SIG has many plants across strategic areas to support the production capacity and distribution of building material products efficiently.

=== Integrated cement plant ===
- Lhoknga, Aceh (capacity of 1.8 million TPY)
- Indarung, West Sumatra (capacity of 8.9 million TPY)
- Baturaja, South Sumatra (capacity of 3.85 million TPY)
- Narogong, West Java (capacity of 6 million TPY)
- Cilacap, Central Java (capacity of 3.4 million TPY)
- Rembang, Central Java (capacity of 4 million TPY)
- Tuban, East Java (capacity of 15 million TPY)
- Pangkep, South Sulawesi (capacity of 7.4 million TPY)
- Quang Ninh, Vietnam (capacity of 2.3 million TPY)

=== Grinding plant ===
- Dumai, Riau (capacity of 900,000 TPY)
- Palembang, South Sumatra (capacity of 350,400 TPY)
- Cigading, West Java (capacity of 1.5 million TPY)
- Gresik, East Java (capacity of 900,000 TPY)
- Bandar Lampung, Lampung (capacity of 350,400 TPY)
- Ho Chi Minh, Vietnam (capacity of 1.2 million TPY)

=== Packing plant ===
SIG has 32 packing plants spread across Sumatra, Java, Kalimantan, Sulawesi, Bali, Maluku, and Papua.

=== Port ===
- Belawan, North Sumatra (capacity of 10,000 DWT)
- Dumai, Riau (capacity of 30,000 DWT)
- Batam, Riau Islands (capacity of 10,000 DWT)
- Teluk Bayur, West Sumatra (capacity of 40,000 DWT)
- Bengkulu, Bengkulu (capacity of 7,500 DWT)
- Bandar Lampung, Lampung (capacity of 10,000 DWT + 10,000 DWT)
- Tuban, East Java (capacity of 60,000 DWT)
- Banyuwangi, East Java (capacity of 10,000 DWT)
- Celukan Bawang, Bali (capacity of 10,000 DWT)
- Pontianak, West Kalimantan (capacity of 5,000 DWT + 4,000 DWT)
- Balikpapan, East Kalimantan (capacity of 10,000 DWT)
- Samarinda, East Kalimantan (capacity of 8,000 DWT)
- Banjarmasin, South Kalimantan (capacity of 5,000 DWT)
- Bitung, North Sulawesi (capacity of 8,000 DWT)
- Mamuju, West Sulawesi (capacity of 7,000 DWT)
- Kendari, Southeast Sulawesi (capacity of 8,000 DWT)
- Biringkasi, South Sulawesi (capacity of 40,000 DWT)
- North Maluku (capacity of 6,000 DWT)
- Ambon, Maluku (capacity of 7,000 DWT)
- Sorong, Papua (capacity of 10,000 DWT)
- Quang Ninh, Vietnam (capacity of 20,000 DWT)
- Ho Chi Minh, Vietnam (capacity of 15,000 DWT)

=== Batching plant ===
SIG has a network of batching plants spread across project locations in Indonesia, namely North Sumatra, Jambi, South Sumatra, Banten, Jakarta, West Java, Central Java, Yogyakarta, East Java, East Kalimantan, North Sulawesi, South Sulawesi, and West Nusa Tenggara.

=== Distribution reach ===
Strategic location of plants in Sumatra, Java, Sulawesi and Vietnam enable SIG to supply the needs of building materials throughout the country with the support of more than 10,000 distributors, sub-distributors and retail stores. Along with domestic sales, SIG also exports to several countries in Asia, Australia, Oceania and Africa including: Singapore, Malaysia, Philippines, China, Bangladesh, Sri Lanka, Myanmar, Fiji, Hong Kong, Maldives, Taiwan, Chile, Peru, and Benin.

== Large-scale Projects ==
=== Roads and Toll Roads ===
- Sigli-Banda Aceh (Sibanceh) Toll Road, Aceh
- Pandaan-Malang Toll Road, East Java
- Bali Mandara Toll Road
- Salatiga Toll Road, Central Java
- Mandalika International Circuit, Central Lombok, West Nusa Tenggara
- Patung Pemuda Roundabout, Jakarta
- Palembang LRT, South Sumatra
- Balikpapan-Samarinda Toll Road
- Manado-Bitung Toll Road

=== Bridge ===
- Kelok Sembilan Bridge, Payakumbuh, West Sumatra.
- Suramadu Bridge (Surabaya-Madura), East Java.
- Red and White Bridge, Ambon, Maluku
- Balang Island Bridge, East Kalimantan
- Youtefa Bridge, Papua
- Purwosari Flyover, Surakarta, Central Java

=== Port ===
- Belawan Port, Medan, North Sumatra
- Bogowonto Flood Control, Central Java
- Patimban Port, Subang, West Java
- Kijing Port, Mempawah, West Kalimantan
- Makassar New Port, South Sulawesi
- Sanur Pier, Bali

=== Dam ===
- Sidan Dam, Bali
- Margatiga Dam, Lampung
- Jatigede Dam, Sumedang, West Java
- Tugu Dam, Trenggalek, East Java
- Sabo Dam Merapi, Central Java
- Temef Dam, East Nusa Tenggara

=== Airport ===
- Yogyakarta International Airport
- Syamsudin Noor Airport, South Kalimantan
- Juanda Airport Surabaya, Sidoarjo
- Kualanamu Airport, Medan, North Sumatra
- Sultan Hasanuddin Airport, Makassar, South Sulawesi
- Frans Kaisiepo Airport, Biak, Papua

=== Hydro Power Plant and Coal-fired Power Plant ===
- Peusangan Hydroelectric Power Plant, Aceh
- Bolaang Mongondow Steam Power Plant, North Sulawesi
- Gresik smelter, East Java
- Morowali smelter, Central Sulawesi
- RDMP Pertamina Balikpapan, East Kalimantan
- Asahan III Hydroelectric Power Plant, North Sumatra
- Jawa Coal-fired Power Plant Unit 9–10, Probolinggo, East Java.
- Batang Coal-fired Power Plant, Central Java
- Pacitan Coal-fired Power Plant, East Java
- Bontang Coal-fired Power Plant, East Kalimantan

=== Building and Industrial ===
- Thamrin Nine Tower, Jakarta
- Jakarta International Stadium, Jakarta
- Serasan Integrated Cross Border Post (PLBN), Natuna, Riau Islands
- Kendal Industrial Park, Central Java
- Batang Industrial Area, Central Java
- Aceh Tsunami Museum, Aceh

== Certifications ==
SIG continuously strives to fulfill various certifications to ensure good corporate governance practices. The certifications that the SIG has achieved include:

- ISO 9001:2015 Quality Management System
- ISO 14001:2015 Environmental Management System
- ISO 37001:2016 Anti-bribery Management System
- ISO 45001:2018 Occupational Health and Safety Management System
- ISO 50001:2018 Energy Management System
- ISO/IEC 17025:2017 General Requirements for Competence of Testing and Calibration Laboratories Occupational Safety and Health Management System (PP No. 50 Tahun 2012)
- International Code for the Security of Ships and Port Facilities (ISPS Code)
- Product Use of SNI Mark (SPPT-SNI) Certificate
- Approval Letter for the Use of the SNI Mark
- The Domestic Component Level (TKDN) Certificate
- Green Industry Certificate
- Self-declared Ecolabel Certificate
- Green Label Indonesia
- BNSP Professional Certification Institute
