= List of districts of North Sulawesi =

The province of North Sulawesi (Sulawesi Utara) in Indonesia is divided into eleven regencies (kabupaten) and four cities (kota), which together are subdivided in turn administratively into 171 districts (kecamatan).

The districts of North Sulawesi with the regency or city each falls into, are as follows:

- Manado (city)
1. Bunaken
2. Bunaken Kepulauan
3. Malalayang
4. Mapanget
5. Paal Dua
6. Sario
7. Singkil
8. Tikala
9. Tuminting
10. Wanea
11. Wenang
- Bitung (city)
1. Aertembaga
2. Girian
3. Lembeh Selatan
4. Lembeh Utara
5. Madidir
6. Maesa
7. Matuari
8. Ranowulu
- Tomohon (city)
1. Tomohon Barat
2. Tomohon Selatan
3. Tomohon Tengah
4. Tomohon Timur
5. Tomohon Utara
- Minahasa Regency
1. Eris
2. Kakas
3. Kakas Barat
4. Kawangkoan
5. Kawangkoan Barat
6. Kawangkoan Utara
7. Kombi
8. Langowan Barat
9. Langowan Selatan
10. Langowan Timur
11. Langowan Utara
12. Lembean Timur
13. Mandolang
14. Pineleng
15. Remboken
16. Sonder
17. Tombariri
18. Tombariri Timur
19. Tombulu
20. Tompaso
21. Tompaso Barat
22. Tondano Barat
23. Tondano Selatan
24. Tondano Timur
25. Tondano Utara
- South Minahasa Regency
1. Amurang
2. Amurang Barat
3. Amurang Timur
4. Kumelembuai
5. Maesaan
6. Modoinding
7. Motoling
8. Motoling Barat
9. Motoling Timur
10. Ranoyapo
11. Sinonsayang
12. Suluun Tareran
13. Tareran
14. Tatapaan
15. Tenga
16. Tompasobaru
17. Tumpaan
- North Minahasa Regency
1. Airmadidi
2. Dimembe
3. Kalawat
4. Kauditan
5. Kema
6. Likupang Barat
7. Likupang Selatan
8. Likupang Timur
9. Talawaan
10. Wori
- Southeast Minahasa Regency
1. Belang
2. Pasan
3. Pusomaen
4. Ratahan
5. Ratahan Timur
6. Ratatotok
7. Silian Raya
8. Tombatu
9. Tombatu Timur
10. Tombatu Utara
11. Touluaan
12. Touluaan Selatan
- Kotamobagu (city)
1. Kotamobagu Barat
2. Kotamobagu Selatan
3. Kotamobagu Timur
4. Kotamobagu Utara
- Bolaang Mongondow Regency
1. Bilalang
2. Bolaang
3. Bolaang Timur
4. Dumoga
5. Dumoga Barat
6. Dumoga Tengah
7. Dumoga Tenggara
8. Dumoga Timur
9. Dumoga Utara
10. Lolak
11. Lolayan
12. Passi Barat
13. Passi Timur
14. Poigar
15. Sangtombolang
- North Bolaang Mongondow Regency
1. Bintauna
2. Bolangitang Barat
3. Bolangitang Timur
4. Kaidipang
5. Pinogaluman
6. Sangkub
- South Bolaang Mongondow Regency
1. Bolaang Uki
2. Helumo
3. Pinolosian
4. Pinolosian Tengah
5. Pinolosian Timur
6. Posigadan
7. Tomini
8. Modisi
- East Bolaang Mongondow Regency
1. Kotabunan
2. Modayag
3. Modayag Barat
4. Mooat
5. Motongkad
6. Nuangan
7. Tutuyan
- Talaud Islands Regency
1. Beo
2. Beo Selatan
3. Beo Utara
4. Damau
5. Essang
6. Essang Selatan
7. Gemeh
8. Kabaruan
9. Kalongan
10. Lirung
11. Melonguane
12. Melonguane Timur
13. Miangas
14. Moronge
15. Nanusa
16. Pulutan
17. Rainis
18. Salibabu
19. Tampan’amma
- Sangihe Islands Regency
1. Kendahe
2. Kepulauan Marore
3. Manganitu
4. Manganitu Selatan
5. Nusa Tabukan
6. Tabukan Selatan
7. Tabukan Selatan Tengah
8. Tabukan Selatan Tenggara
9. Tabukan Tengah
10. Tabukan Utara
11. Tahuna
12. Tahuna Barat
13. Tahuna Timur
14. Tamako
15. Tatoareng
- Sitaro Islands Regency
1. Biaro
2. Siau Barat
3. Siau Barat Selatan
4. Siau Barat Utara
5. Siau Tengah
6. Siau Timur
7. Siau Timur Selatan
8. Tagulandang
9. Tagulandang Selatan
10. Tagulandang Utara
