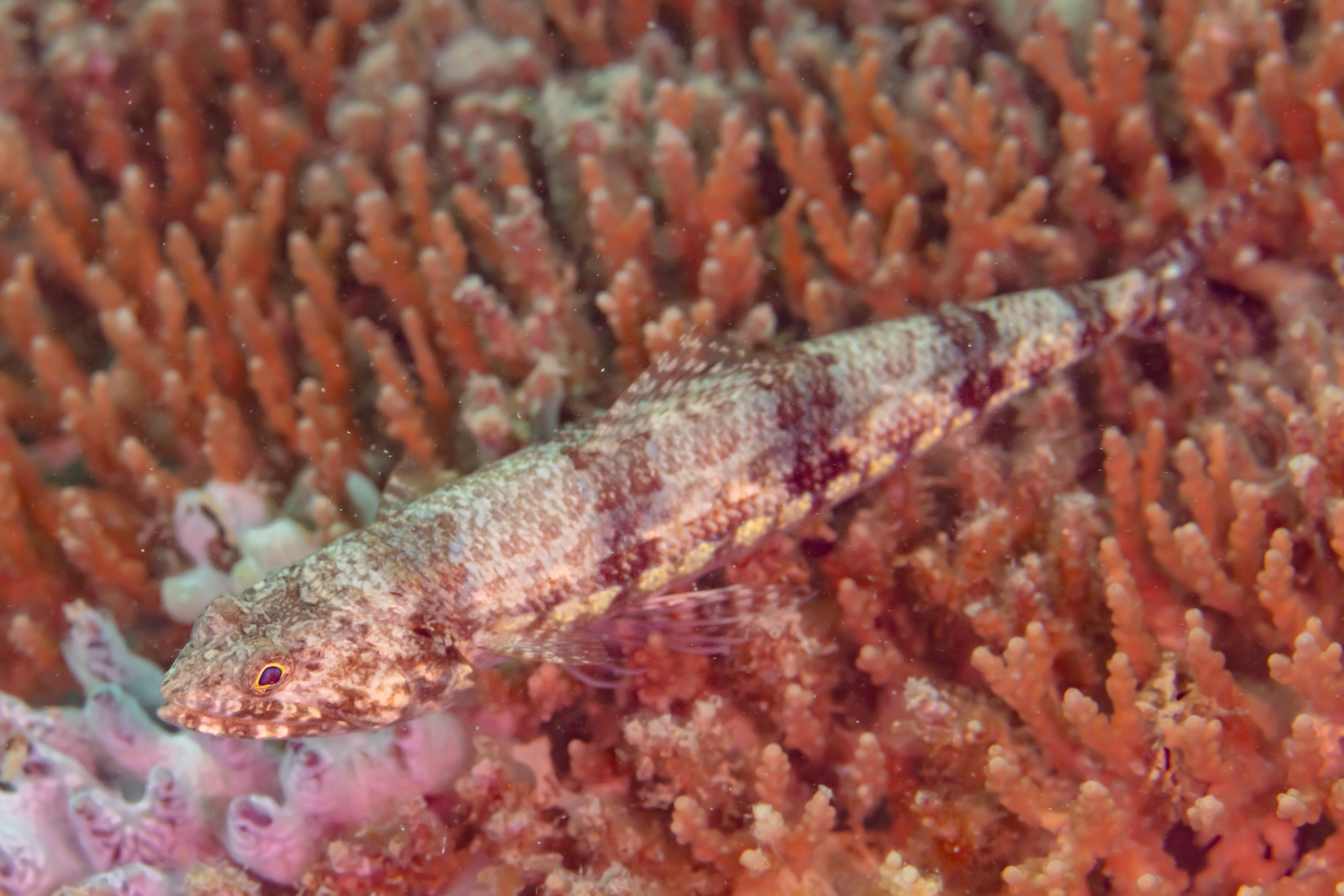

Conservation status
- Least Concern (IUCN 3.1)

Scientific classification
- Kingdom: Animalia
- Phylum: Chordata
- Class: Actinopterygii
- Division: Teleostei
- Order: Aulopiformes
- Family: Synodontidae
- Genus: Synodus
- Species: S. variegatus

Binomial name
- Synodus variegatus (Lacépède, 1803)

Synonyms
- Synodus englemani L. P. Schultz, 1953

= Variegated lizardfish =

Species of fish

The variegated lizardfish (Synodus variegatus) is a lizardfish of the family Synodontidae found in the western Pacific and Indian Oceans, at depths from 4 to 90 m. It can reach a maximum length of 40 cm.

== Description ==
The body of the variegated lizardfish is rounded in cross-section, with a broad, slightly flattened head and a large, wide mouth. The upper and lower jaws project equally, and both jaws, along with all mouth bones, are armed with conical, barbed teeth. Its strong, thick pelvic fins function as supports when the fish rests on the seabed while waiting to ambush prey.

The variegated lizardfish varies in color from grey to red, with hourglass-shaped markings.

== Taxonomy ==
The species Synodus dermatogenys was once misidentified as S. variegatus, while the true S. variegatus was referred to as S. englemani Schultz, 1953 by many authors, including Gosline & Brock (1960) and Cressey (1981). However, Waples and Randall (1989) showed that S. variegatus is a senior synonym of S. englemani, and that S. dermatogenys is the correct name for the lizardfish that Cressey (1981) identified as S. variegatus.

== Gallery ==
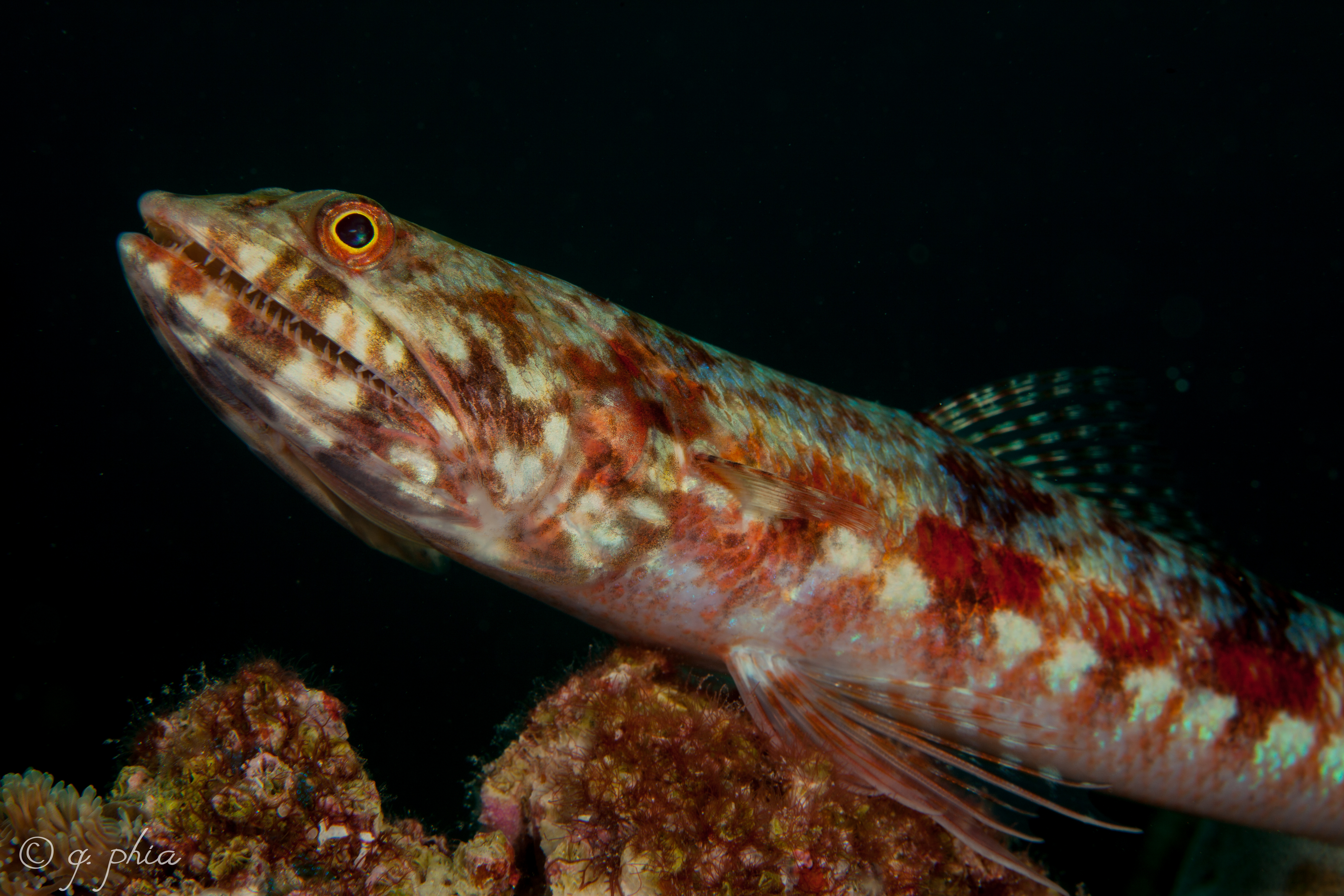
Variegated lizardfish at Wakatobi National Park Indonesia, 2018

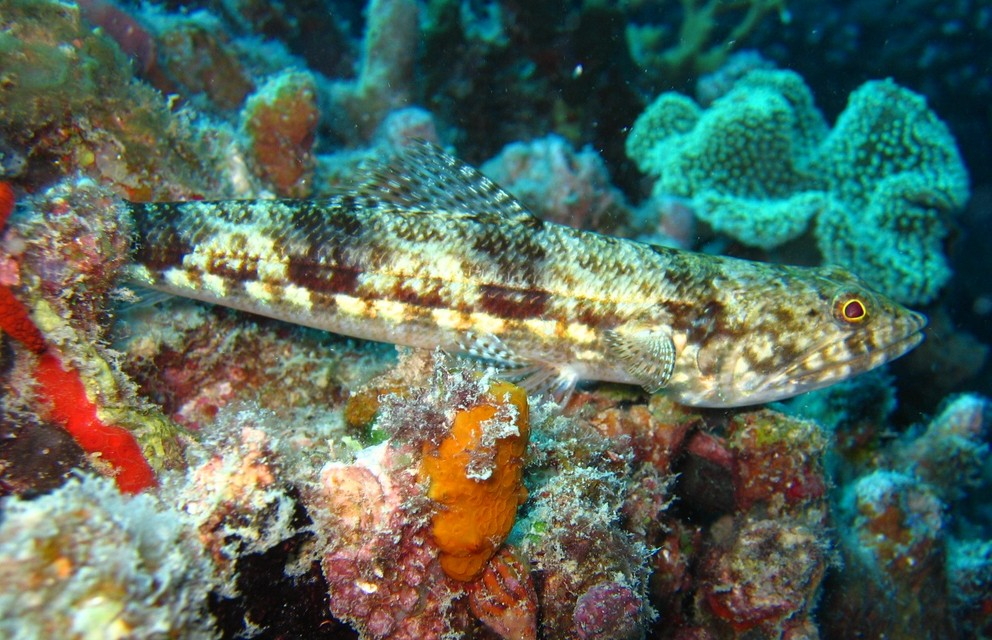
Variegated lizardfish at St. Crispin's Reef Australia, 2004

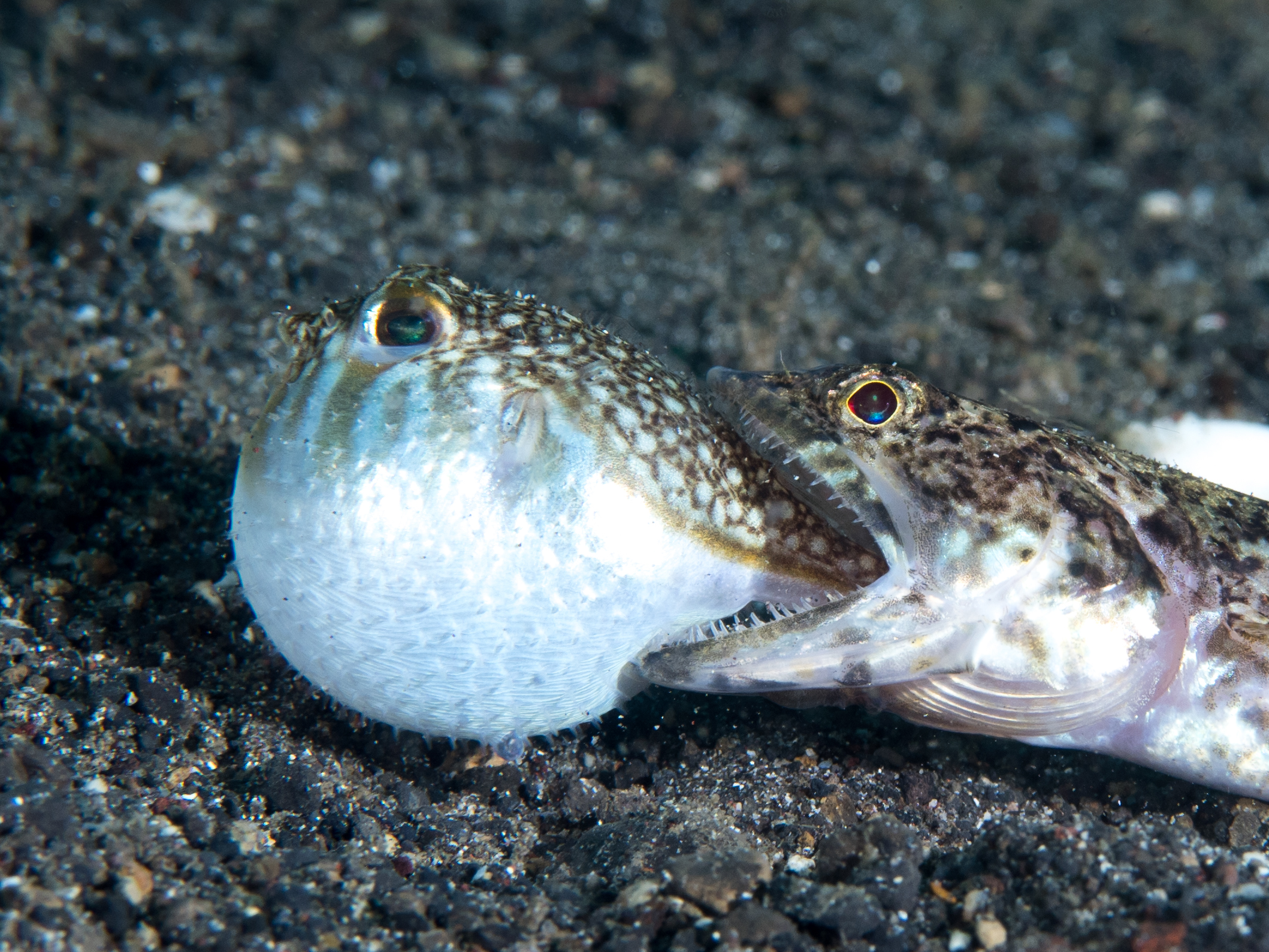
Variegated lizardfish eating Shortfin Puffer at Lembeh Indonesia, 2018

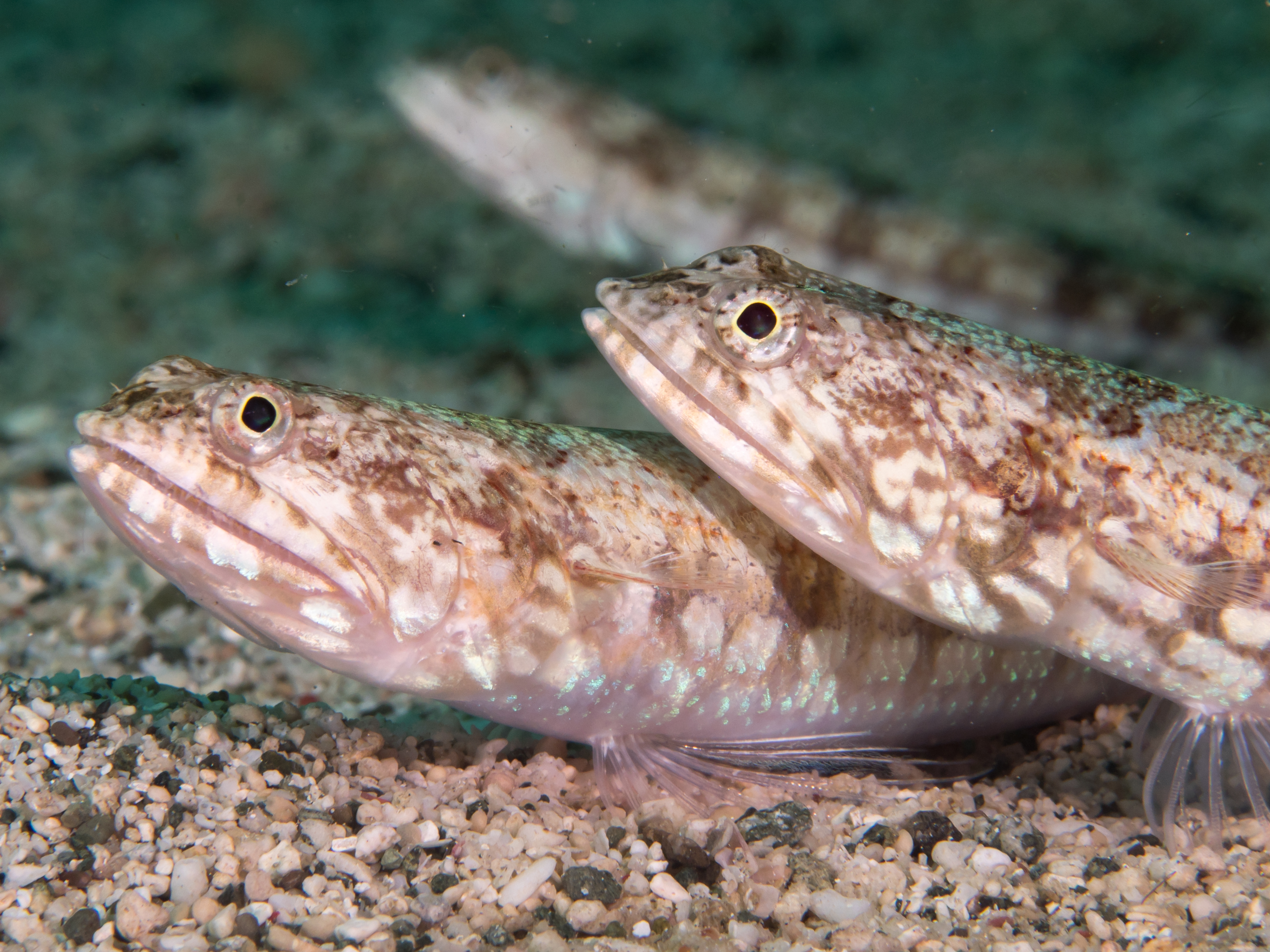
Variegated lizardfish at Raja Ampat Indonesia, 2020

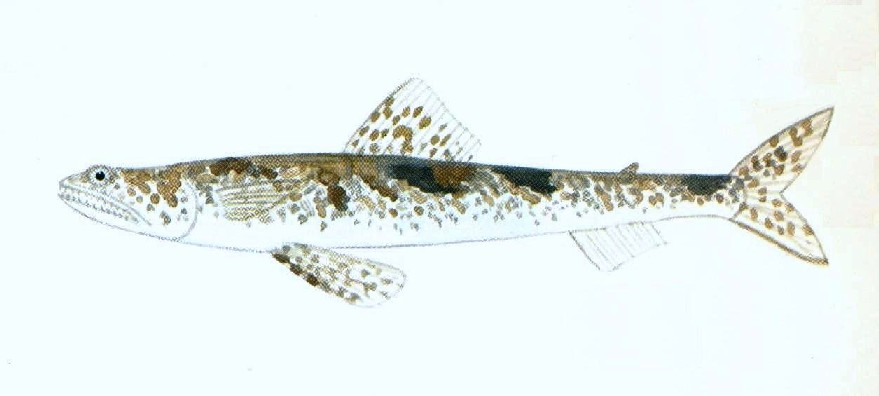
Drawing of Variegated lizardfish

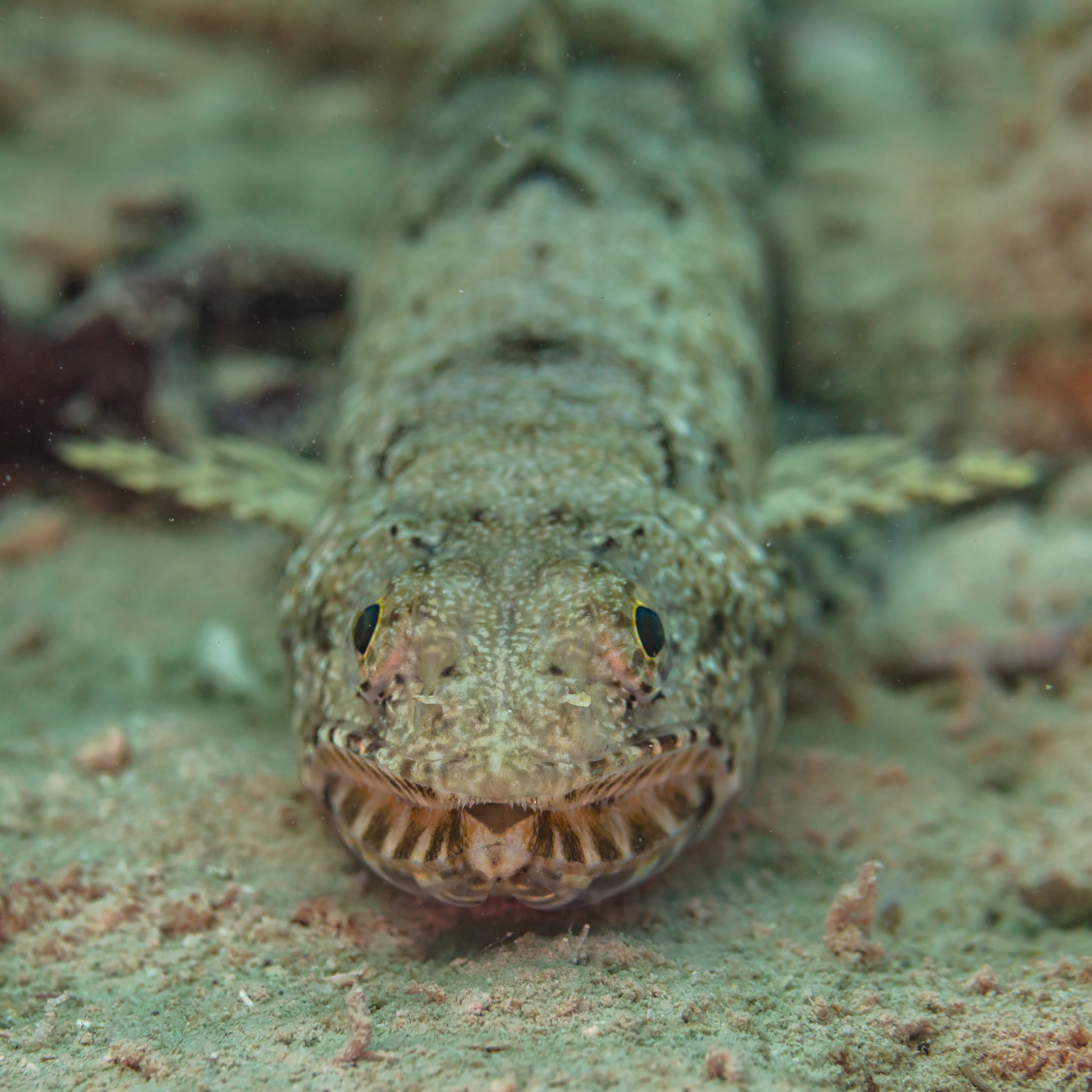
Close-up
