= Airmadidi =

- Town
- Location in Sulawesi and Indonesia Airmadidi (Indonesia)
- Coordinates: 1°26′N 124°59′E
- Country: Indonesia
- Region: Sulawesi
- Province: North Sulawesi
- Regency: North Minahasa Regency

Government
  - Camat: Vicky Dondokambey

Area
  - Total: 86.51 km^{2} (33.40 sq mi)

Population (mid 2022 estimate)
  - Total: 31,446
  - Density: 363.5/km^{2} (941.4/sq mi)
- Time zone: UTC+8 (ICST)
- Postcode: 95371
- Area code: (+62) 431
- Villages: 9

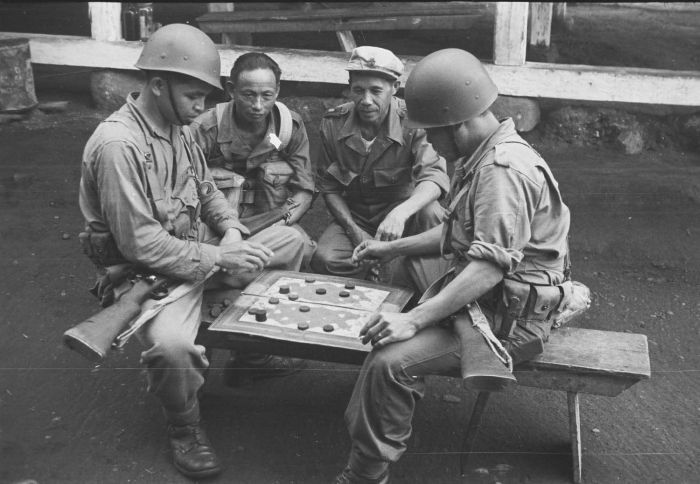
Reserves play a board game in Airmadidi (1949)

Airmadidi is the capital of the North Minahasa Regency, North Sulawesi, Indonesia. Airmadidi is home to Universitas Klabat (Klabat University). There is also a well-known Airmadidi market.

The word Airmadidi means boiling water and the area is home to mineral springs. There are also waruga sarcophagi in the area.

== Demographics ==
The Airmadidi subdistrict had an estimated population of 31,446 in mid-2022.

== People ==
The Minahasan politician Antoinette Waroh was born here in 1901.

== Administrative Division ==
This district is divided into 9 villages:

1. Airmadidi Atas
2. Airmadidi Bawah
3. Sarongsong I
4. Sarongsong II
5. Rap-rap
6. Sukur
7. Sawangan (Village)
8. Tanggari (Village)
9. Sampiri (Village)

== Mass media ==
KWAM-TV (LPPL North Minahasa Regency) closed on September 19, 2012 (This name is taken from the name of a television station in the United States) Operates as North Minahasa Regency Government on April 17, 2004. This television station was the first local public broadcasting institution in North Sulawesi from 2004 until it stopped operating in 2012. Abbreviated (Kawanua Waruga Air Madidi - Televisi). Pioneer this means that the of the first local public broadcasting institution in North Sulawesi names is taken from a television station in the United States but a television station in North Minahasa, North Sulawesi, Indonesia.

== Climate ==
Airmadidi has a tropical rainforest climate (Af) with heavy to very heavy rainfall year-round.

Climate data for Airmadidi
Month	Jan	Feb	Mar	Apr	May	Jun	Jul	Aug	Sep	Oct	Nov	Dec	Year
Mean daily maximum °C (°F)	28.2 (82.8)	28.2 (82.8)	28.4 (83.1)	29.4 (84.9)	29.5 (85.1)	29.5 (85.1)	29.5 (85.1)	30.1 (86.2)	30.4 (86.7)	30.4 (86.7)	29.5 (85.1)	28.8 (83.8)	29.3 (84.8)
Daily mean °C (°F)	24.5 (76.1)	24.5 (76.1)	24.7 (76.5)	25.2 (77.4)	25.4 (77.7)	25.3 (77.5)	25.2 (77.4)	25.5 (77.9)	25.5 (77.9)	25.6 (78.1)	25.2 (77.4)	25.0 (77.0)	25.1 (77.3)
Mean daily minimum °C (°F)	20.9 (69.6)	20.9 (69.6)	21.1 (70.0)	21.0 (69.8)	21.4 (70.5)	21.1 (70.0)	20.9 (69.6)	20.9 (69.6)	20.6 (69.1)	20.8 (69.4)	21.0 (69.8)	21.2 (70.2)	21.0 (69.8)
Average rainfall mm (inches)	350 (13.8)	295 (11.6)	255 (10.0)	250 (9.8)	241 (9.5)	201 (7.9)	148 (5.8)	119 (4.7)	139 (5.5)	168 (6.6)	263 (10.4)	307 (12.1)	2,736 (107.7)
Source: Climate-Data.org

== Transport ==
Airmadidi is connected to the nearby cities of Manado and Bitung through an exit at the Manado-Bitung Toll Road. It is also served by a number of angkot public transport routes.
