= Manado–Bitung Toll Road =

Toll road in North Sulawesi, Indonesia

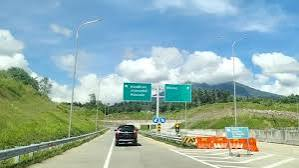
- Car heading to Manado Airmadidi Exit

Route information
- Maintained by PT Jasa Marga Manado Bitung (JMB)
- Length: 39 km (24 mi)
- Existed: 2018; 8 years ago–present

Major junctions
- West end: Manado
- East end: Bitung

Location
- Country: Indonesia
- Island: Sulawesi
- Provinces: North Sulawesi
- Major cities: Manado, North Minahasa Regency, Bitung

Highway system
- Transport in Indonesia

Manado-Bitung Toll Road is a controlled-access toll road that connects Manado and Bitung, the two largest cities of North Sulawesi province in the island of Sulawesi, Indonesia. This toll road serves as the main access road to Bitung Special Economic Zone (SEZ) and Bitung International Hub Port.

This toll road is expected to boost economic growth in Manado, North Minahasa, and Bitung. This toll road will also boost tourism as it will enable easy access to various tourist attractions in Sulawesi, including the Rumah Alam Manado Adventure Park, Kima Atas waterfall, Lembeh Mangrove forest, Tangkoko Batuangus Nature Reserve, Gunung Dua Saudara, and other beaches.

The toll road was inaugurated by President Joko Widodo on 25 February 2022, after the completion of all sections.

== Sections ==
This toll road is divided into four sections, namely

- Section 1A (Manado-Sukur ring road) is 7.9 kilometres (4.9 miles)
- Section 1B (Sukur-Air Madidi) is 7 kilometres (4.3 miles)
- Section 2A (Airmadidi-Danowudu) is 11.5 kilometres (7.1 miles)
- Section 2B (Danowudu-Bitung) is 13.5 kilometres (8.4 miles)

== Junction lists ==
The entire route is located in North Sulawesi.

Regency	Location	km	mi	Exit	Name	Destinations	Notes
Manado	Tikala	0.0	0.0	0	Manado terminus	Manado, Sam Ratulangi International Airport	Western terminus
Manado	Tikala	1.0	0.62	Manado toll gate			
North Minahasa	Airmadidi	11.0	6.8	11	Airmadidi toll gate	Airmadidi, Tondano	
North Minahasa	Kauditan	19.9	12.4	20	Kauditan toll gate	Kauditan	
Bitung	Ranowulu	25.6	15.9	25	Danowudu toll gate	Danowudu, Bitung, Bitung Special Economic Zone	
Bitung	Maesa	37.3	23.2	Bitung toll gate			
Bitung	Aertembaga	39.6	24.6	39	Bitung terminus	Bitung, Port of Bitung	Eastern terminus
1.000 mi = 1.609 km; 1.000 km = 0.621 mi: Electronic toll collection

== See also ==
- Transport in Indonesia
