= Hengky Honandar =

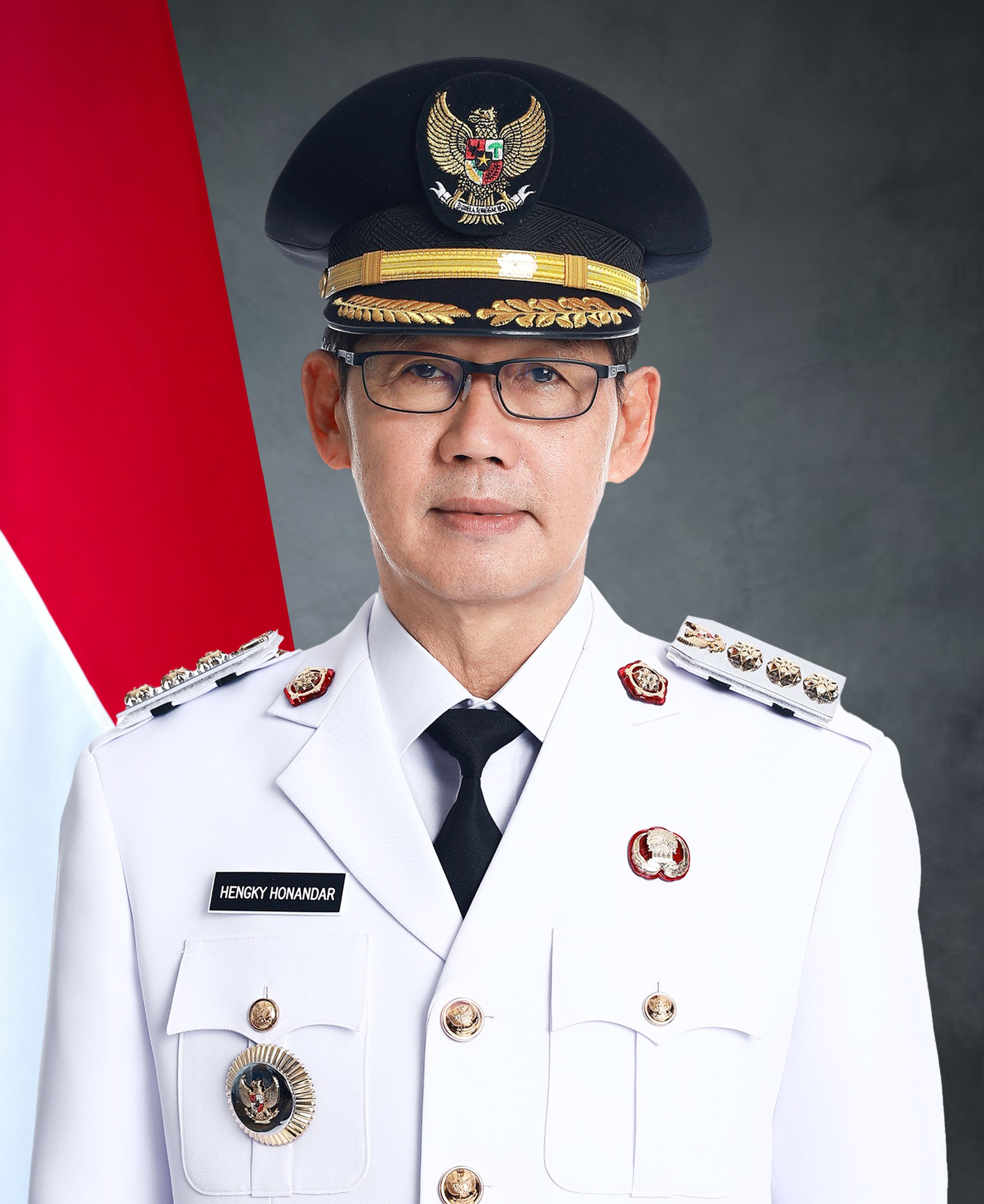
- Portrait as mayor, 2025

Mayor of Bitung
- Incumbent
- Assumed office 20 February 2025
- Preceded by: Maurits Mantiri

Vice Mayor of Bitung
- In office 31 March 2021 – 20 February 2025
- Preceded by: Maurits Mantiri
- Succeeded by: Randito Maringka

Personal details
- Born: 28 May 1964 (age 62) Ambon, Maluku, Indonesia
- Party: NasDem Party

Hengky Honandar (born 28 May 1964) is an Indonesian politician of the NasDem Party who is the mayor of Bitung, North Sulawesi, who has served in the position since February 2025. He had previously been the city's vice-mayor in 2021–2025, and had run unsuccessfully for mayor in 2015.

== Early life ==
Hengky Honandar was born in Ambon, Maluku on 28 May 1964. He studied there for some time, completing middle school from a Catholic school in 1980, before going to Manado for high school and graduating in 1984. Honandar then enrolled at an Economic Polytechnic in Manado, receiving his bachelor's in 1991.

== Career ==
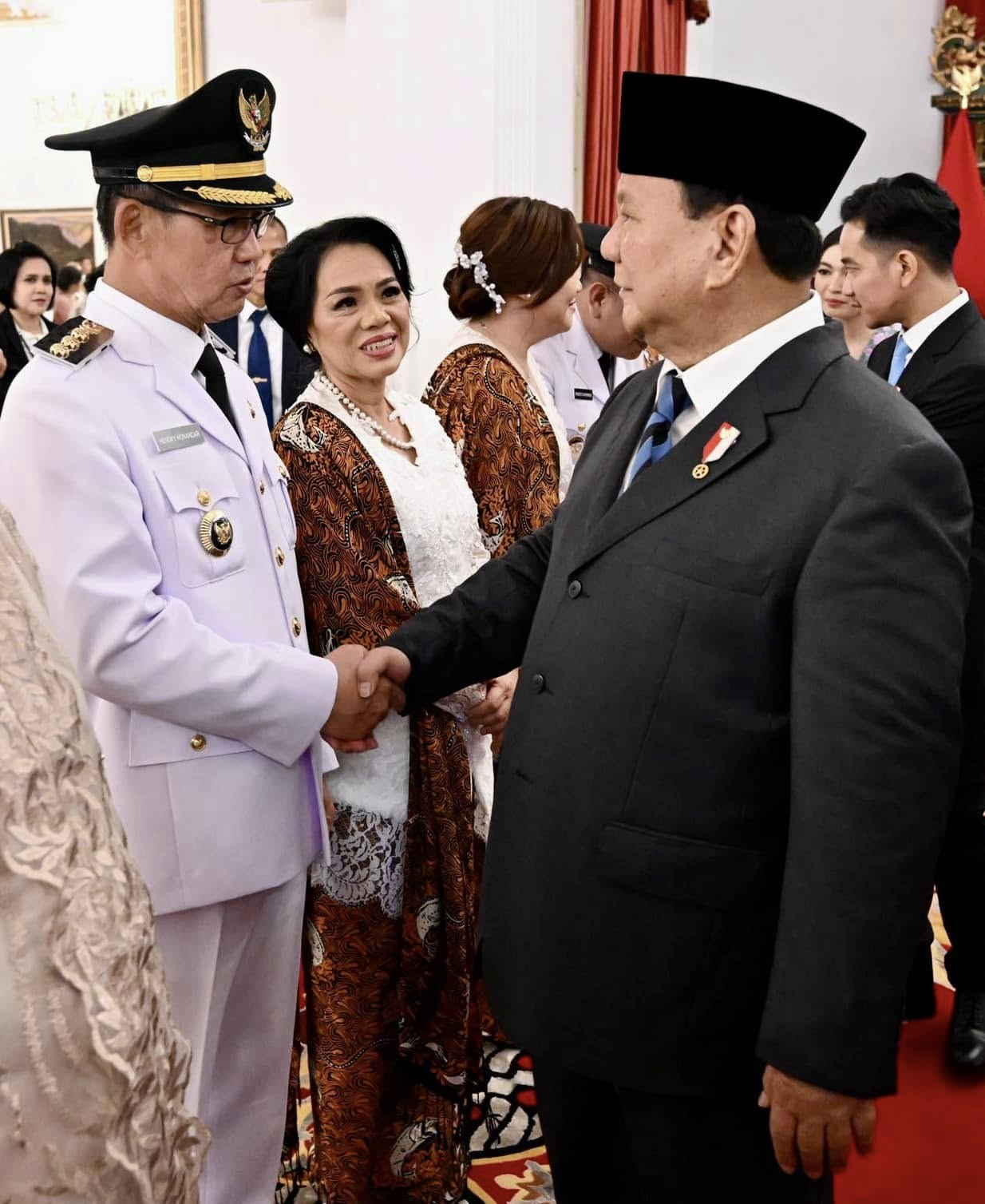
Honandar (left) in 2025 with president Prabowo Subianto.

His political career began in 2014, when he was elected into Bitung's Regional House of Representatives (DPRD), as a member of the Democratic Party, becoming the DPRD's deputy chairman. He resigned in 2015 to run in the city's mayoral election, but was defeated. In the following election in 2019, he was elected as a PDI-P member in North Sulawesi's provincial DPRD, and again resigned in 2020 to become running mate to mayoral candidate Maurits Mantiri. Mantiri and Honandar were elected. They were sworn in on 31 March 2021.

In the 2024 mayoral election, Mantiri opted to not run for a second term, while Honandar ran for mayor. To run for the election, Honandar moved to the NasDem Party. Honandar's candidacy was initially disputed due to several city officials being replaced prior to his registration, potentially violating electoral laws. However, he was confirmed as a candidate, with Randito Maringka as running mate.

Honandar and Maringka proceeded to win the mayoral election after receiving 73,388 votes (63.8%). They were sworn in on 20 February 2025, along with most other regional leaders elected in 2024.

== Personal life ==
Honandar is a Catholic. He is married to Ellen Sondakh, the younger sister of two-term (2006–2016) mayor of Bitung Hanny Sondakh. The couple had four children. Their eldest son, Briando Honandar, died from an accidental electrocution in 2024.
