= Antoinette Waroh =

Indonesian politician

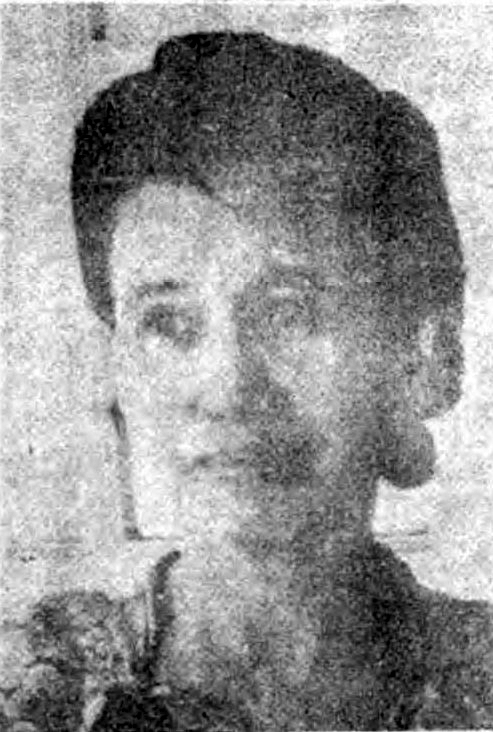

Member of the People's Representative Council
- In office 20 March 1950 – 26 March 1956
- Parliamentary group: East Indonesia (1950); Democratic Fraction (1950-1954); Independent (1954-1956)

Member of the Provisional Representative Body of East Indonesia
- In office 10 November 1947 – 20 March 1950
- Parliamentary group: National Fraction

Personal details
- Born: 25 November 1901 Airmadidi, Minahasa, Dutch East Indies
- Died: 9 March 1991 (aged 89) Airmadidi, Minahasa, Indonesia
- Party: National People's Party
- Spouse: Eldad Weënas (m. 1926; div. 1938)
- Children: Teddy Weënas
- Nickname(s): Oma Nette, Oma Parlemen

Antoinette Wailan Weënas (25 November 1901 – 9 March 1991), better known by her birth name Antoinette Wailan Waroh, was an Indonesian politician who became the only female parliament member in the Provisional Representative Body of East Indonesia.

== Early life ==
Waroh was born on 25 November 1901 in Airmendidih (old spelling) in Minahasa. She graduated from the school by the age of 16, and continued her studies at the Teacher's School in Ambon.

== Career ==
After she graduated from the school, she worked as a teacher in the Hollandsch-Inlandsche School in Airmendidih. She moved to Manado in 1921, and became a teacher in the Meisjes Normaalschool of Manado. In 1934, she was promoted and became the vice principal of the school, and in 1935, she was employed to the government at the Women Education Bureau in the Manado Residency.

She resigned as an employee in 1939, and moved to Makassar. She worked again as a teacher at the Meisjes Normaalschool in Blitar, Makassar. In 1942, she was promoted and became the headmaster of the school.

She moved again to Makassar and worked as a teacher in the General Elementary School and the Female Teacher's School. She only worked in there for several years, and in 1947 she began to work in the government of the newly formed State of East Indonesia. She became the school inspector and the inspector for female education of East Indonesia. A few months later, Waroh was promoted as the Head of the Education Bureau of East Indonesia.

== Parliamentary career ==
On 10 December 1947, Waroh was elected as a member of the Provisional Representative Body of East Indonesia from the National Fraction, making her the first and only female member of the representative body. Waroh was reported to have criticized the members of the parliament for failing to make a binding resolution regarding the dissolution of the cabinet of the State of East Indonesia.

After the formation of the People's Representative Council of the United States of Indonesia, Waroh became a member of the council on 20 March 1950, representing East Indonesia. After the council was dissolved, she retained this position, and became the member of the Provisional People's Representative Council from the Democratic fraction. She withdrew from the fraction on 1 May 1954, and since then, she has been independent.

During the 1955 Indonesian Constitutional Assembly election, Waroh was nominated as the member for the Constitutional Assembly for the West Java, West Kalimantan, and the Central and North Sulawesi constituency for the National People's Party. She did not win the election, and her party only obtained one seat in the Constitutional Assembly.

== Later life and death ==
After her term in the council ended, Waroh participated in women organizations, such as KOWANI (Indonesian Women's Congress) and PIKAT (Love of His Mother to Her Children) organization. In 1972, Waroh became the chairwoman of PIKAT.

By the people in her hometown, Waroh was nicknamed Oma Parlemen (Grandma Parliament).

Waroh died on 9 March 1991 in Airmadidi. She was buried in the Lower Airmadidi Public Cemetery on 11 March 1991.

== Personal life ==
Waroh was married to Eldad Weënas in 1926 and they were divorced in 1938. The marriage resulted in one child, named Teddy Weënas.

== Bibliography ==
- Government of Dutch East Indies (1935), Regeerings-Almanak voor Nederlandsch-Indie (in Dutch), vol. 2, Batavia: Landsdrukkerij
- Bastiaans, W. Ch. J. (1950), Personalia Van Staatkundige Eenheden (Regering en Volksvertegenwoordiging) in Indonesie (per 1 Sept. 1949) (PDF), Jakarta, archived from the original (PDF) on 23 October 2019
- Tim Penyusun Sejarah (1970), Seperempat Abad Dewan Perwakilan Rakyat Republik Indonesia [A Quarter Century of the People's Representative Council of the Republic of Indonesia] (PDF) (in Indonesian), Jakarta: Sekretariat DPR-GR, archived from the original (PDF) on 7 April 2023
- Ministry of Information (1956), Kumpulan Peraturan-Peraturan untuk Pemilihan Konstituante (in Indonesian), Jakarta: State Printing Company (Pertjetakan Negara)
- Dajoh, Marius Ramis (1954), Patriot Irian Damai (PDF) (in Indonesian), Jakarta: Penerbit Grafika
- Bureau of Cultural Affairs for Customs and Folklore Affairs (1960), Brosur Adat Istiadat dan Tjeritera Rakjat (in Indonesian), Jakarta: Ministry of Education
- Ministry of Information (1952), Kami Perkenalkan [We Introduce] (PDF) (in Indonesian), Jakarta: Archipel Printers & Editors
