= Dani Namangge =

Indonesian association footballer

Personal information
- Full name: Dani Marvelous Namangge
- Date of birth: 8 March 1989 (age 37)
- Place of birth: Bitung, Indonesia
- Height: 1.75 m (5 ft 9 in)
- Position: Forward

Youth career
- 1998: SSB Boca Junior Nabati
- 2004: Akademi PSG Girian

Senior career*
Years	Team	Apps	(Gls)
2005	Persmin Minahasa		
2005	Persidago Gorontalo		
2006–2008	Persibom Bolaang Mongondow	31	(0)
2009–2010	Persikab Bandung	17	(0)
2010–2011	Bontang	18	(1)
2011–2012	Gresik United	0	(0)
2013	Persik Kendal		
2014–2015	Persibat Batang	13	(0)
2016	Kalteng Putra	4	(0)
2016	Martapura	6	(1)
2017	Persibat Batang	4	(0)
2018	Persiba Balikpapan	6	(1)
2018–2019	PSPS Riau	13	(4)
2019	Persibat Batang	8	(3)
2020	Sulut United	1	(0)
- * Club domestic league appearances and goals

Dani Marvelous Namangge (born 8 March 1989) is an Indonesian former footballer played as a forward.

== Club career ==
=== Sulut United ===
He was signed for Sulut United to play in the Liga 2 in the 2020 season.

== Honours ==
=== Club ===
Persibat Batang

- Liga Indonesia First Division runner-up: 2014
