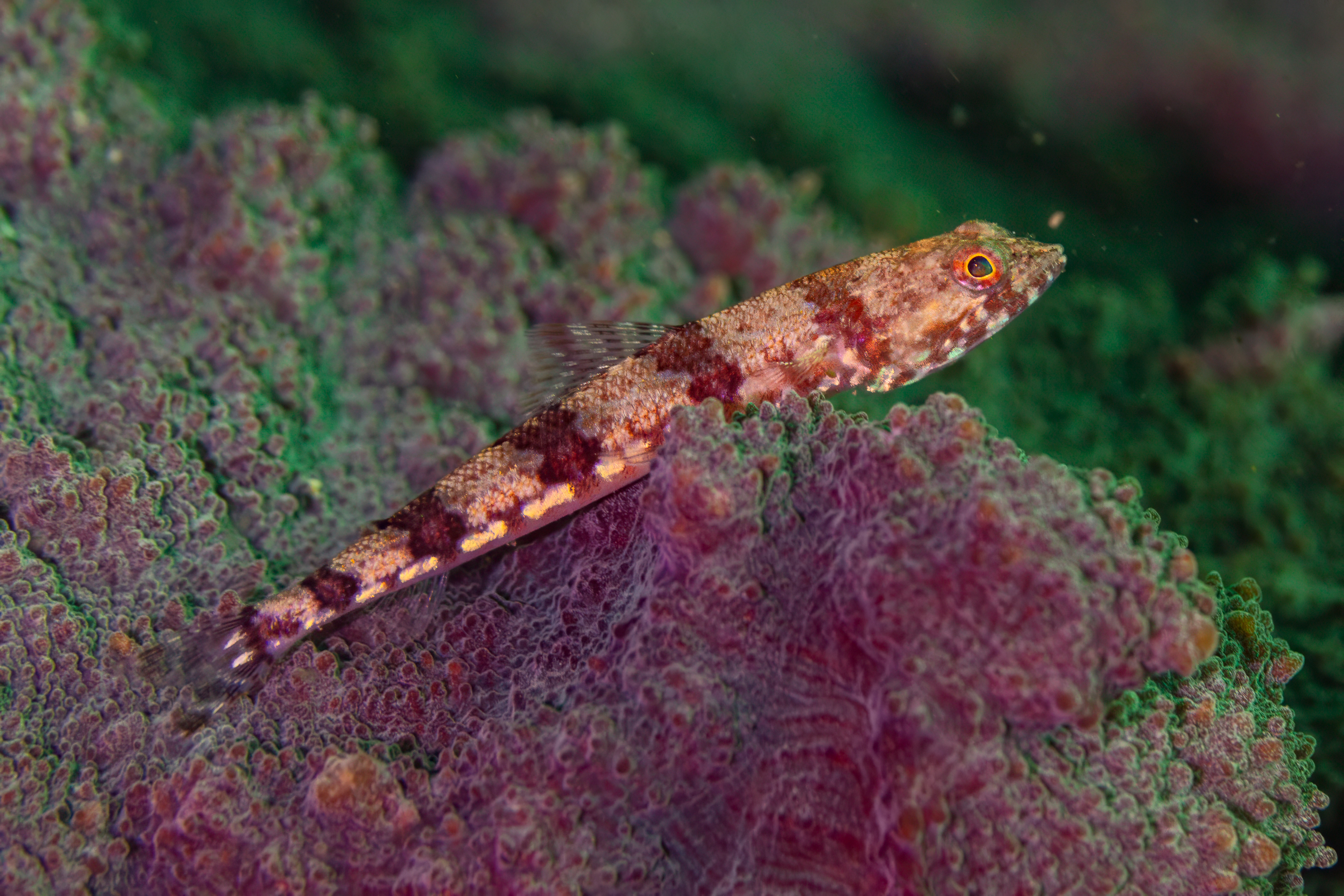
- Synodus dermatogenys off the coast of Oman
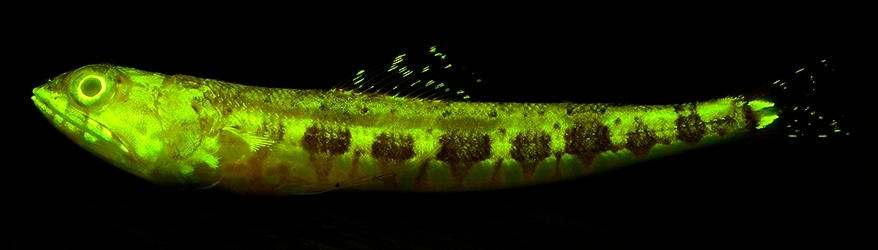
- Biofluorescence of Synodus dermatogenys

Scientific classification
- Kingdom: Animalia
- Phylum: Chordata
- Class: Actinopterygii
- Order: Aulopiformes
- Family: Synodontidae
- Genus: Synodus
- Species: S. dermatogenys

Binomial name
- Synodus dermatogenys Fowler, 1912

Synonyms
- Synodus amaranthus Waples & Randall, 1988

= Sand lizardfish =

Species of fish

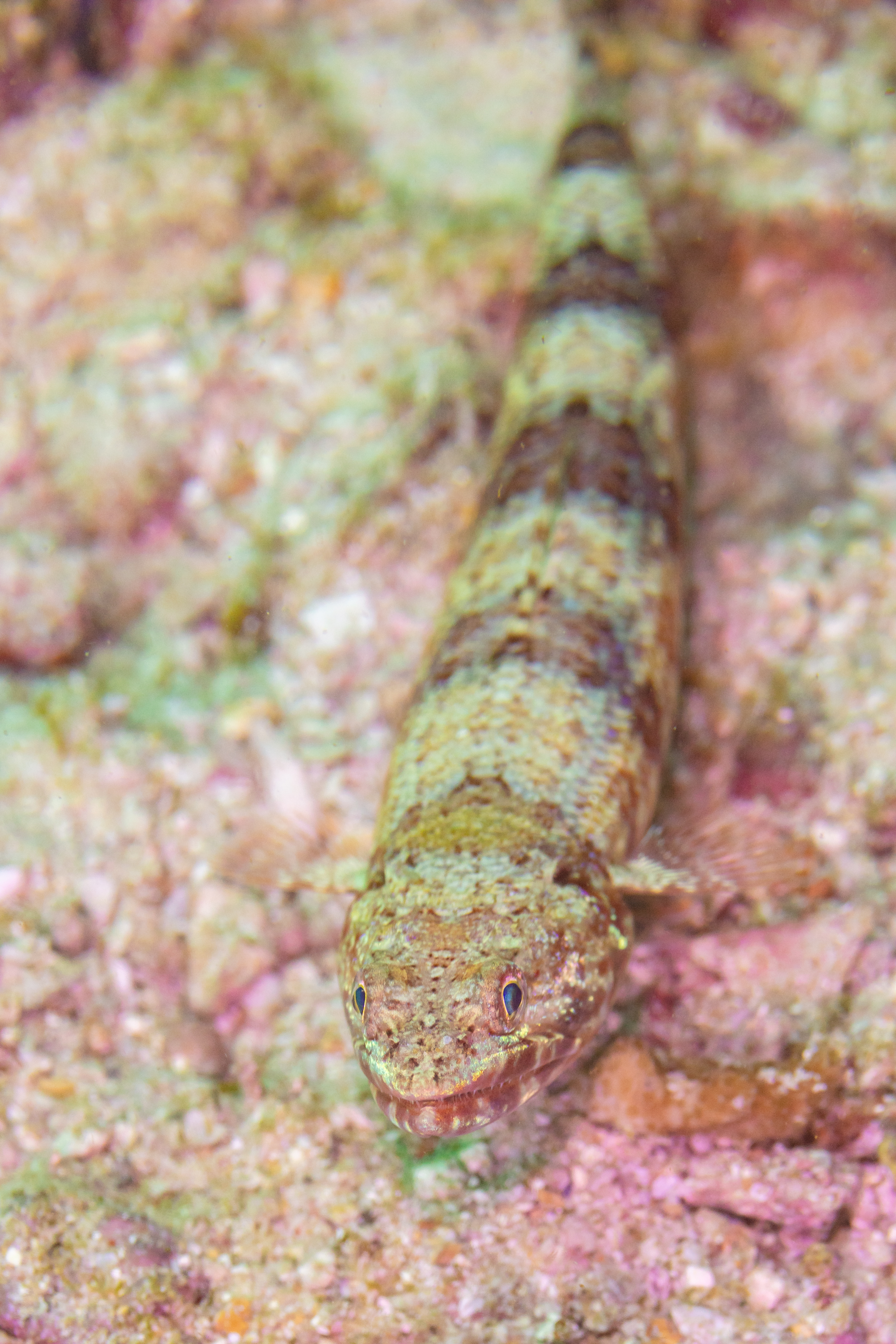
Front view

The sand lizardfish, clearfin lizardfish or variegated lizardfish (Synodus dermatogenys) is a species of lizardfish that lives mainly in the Indo-Pacific.

== Description ==
Synodus dermatogenys is found in a marine environment within a reef-associated depth range of about 1–70 meters. This species is native to a tropical climate. The maximum recorded length of the Synodus dermatogenys as an unsexed male is about 24 centimeters or about 9.44 inches. It can be identified by the five or six red-brown vertical bars that intersect a red horizontal broken band on the flank, immediately below this band is a line of whitish dots although the colours can vary depending on the surroundings. This species is native to the areas of Indo-Pacific, Red Sea, Hawaiian, Line, Marquesan, Tuamoto islands, north to Ryukyu Islands, south to Lord Howe, Micronesia, Southeast Atlantic, Algoa Bay, and South Africa. It is common to find this species in sand-rubble areas of lagoon and seaward reefs to over 20 meters of benthic depth. This species buries itself in the sand while exposing its eyes and nostrils. It is known to find this species solitary or in small groups. Sand lizardfish is a predator of small fish and crustaceans, its mouth is full of sharp needle-like teeth.

Sand lizardfish exhibits biofluorescence, that is, when illuminated by blue or ultraviolet light, it re-emits it as green, and appears differently than under white light illumination. Biofluorescence may assist in intraspecific communication and camouflage.

== Taxonomy ==
For several years, the name Synodus variegatus was misapplied to S. dermatogenys, while the true S. variegatus was referred to as S. englemani Schultz, 1953 by many authors, including Cressey (1981). However, Waples and Randall (1989) showed that S. variegatus is a senior synonym of S. englemani, and that S. dermatogenys is the correct name for the lizardfish that Cressey (1981) identified as S. variegatus.

== Notes ==
- Froese, Rainer; Pauly, Daniel (eds.). "Synodus dermatogenys". FishBase. April 2012 version.
