= Kema District =

Kema
- Kecamatan
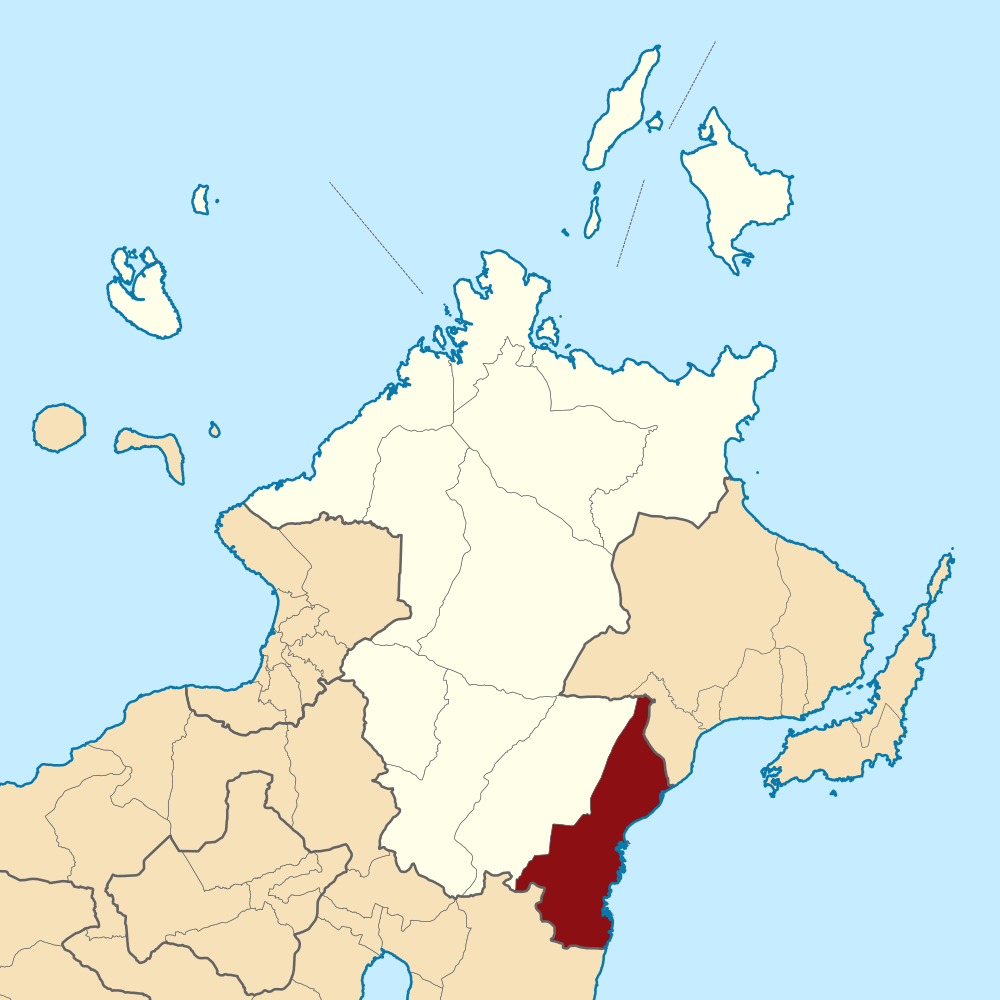
- Location of Kema within North Minahasa
- Interactive map of Kema
- Country: Indonesia
- Province: North Sulawesi
- Regency: North Minahasa
- Villages/Sub-districts: 10

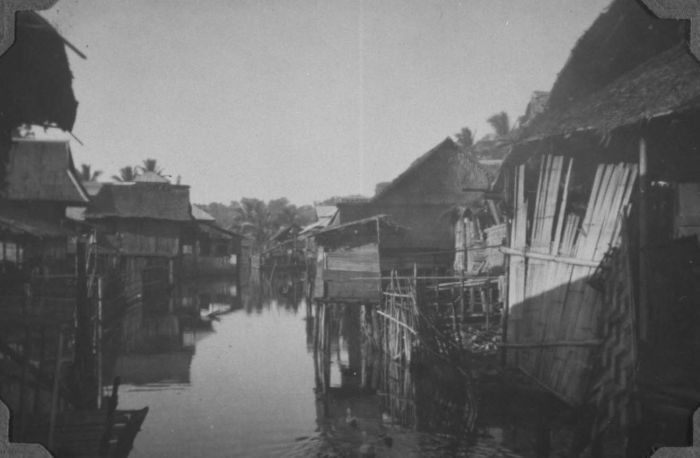
Dwellings in the water, Kema

Kema (Kecamatan Kema) is a district in North Minahasa Regency, North Sulawesi Province, Indonesia.
