= Lembeh Strait =

Strait in Indonesia

Coordinates: 1°26′59″N 125°13′18.5″E

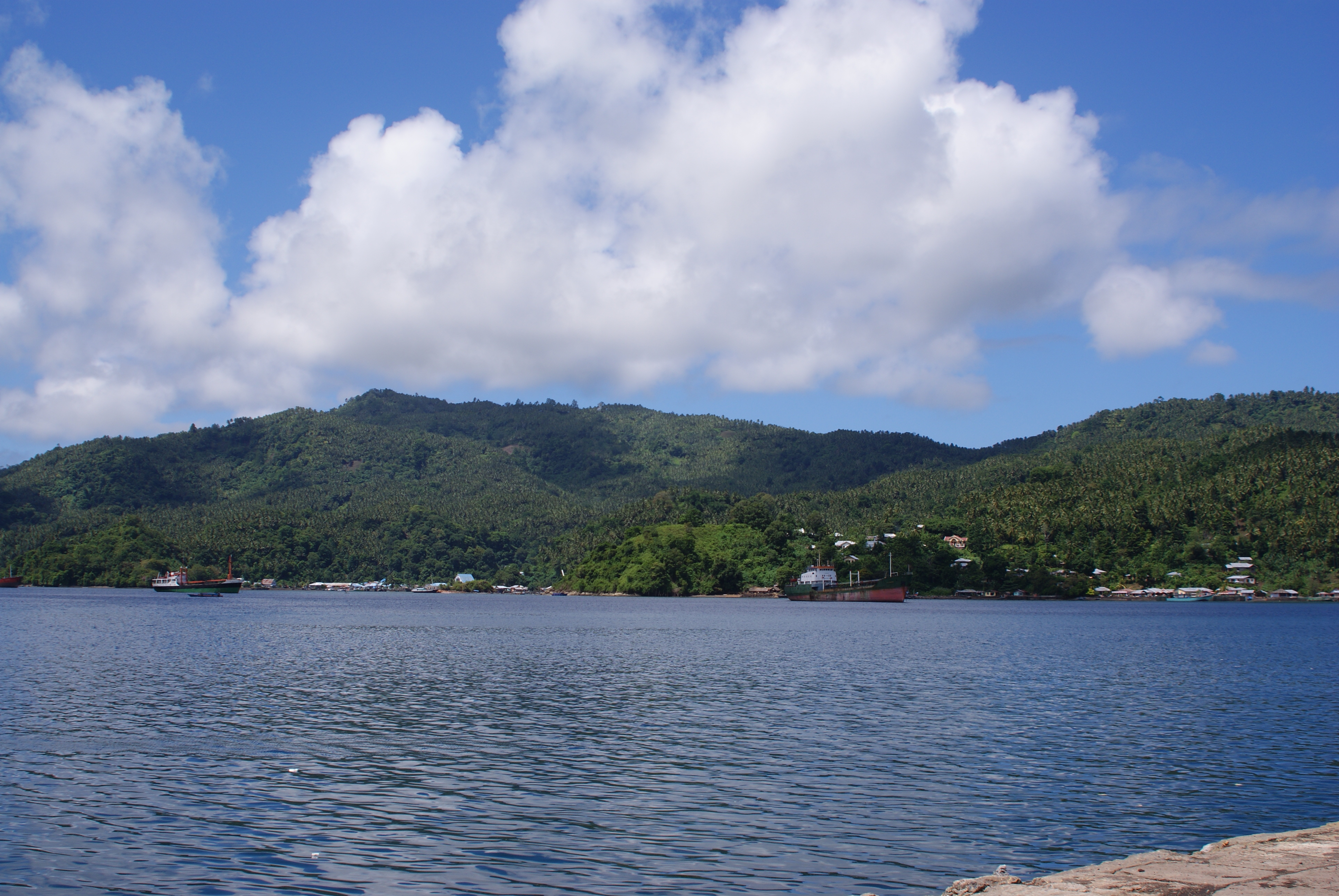
Lembeh Strait, the other side of land is Lembeh island

Lembeh Strait is a strait in Indonesia, separating the islands of Sulawesi and Lembeh. The town of Bitung and Tongkoko volcano are located on the western side of the strait.

The strait is known for its abundant and colorful marine life, in particular sea slugs, and is a popular diving spot.
