= Universitas Klabat =

Christian university in Indonesia

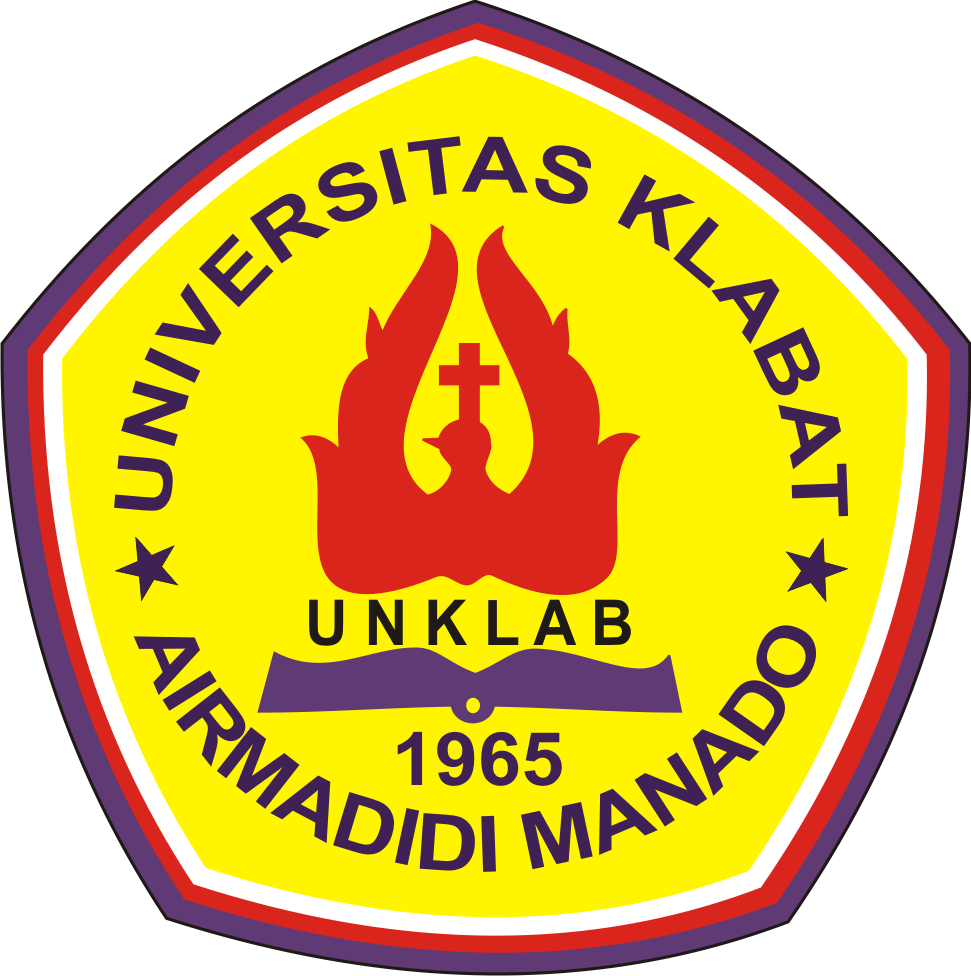
- Other name: Unklab formerly PTK
- Former names: Mount Klabat College, Perguruan Tinggi Klabat
- Motto: Pathway to Excellence
- Type: Private
- Established: 1965; 61 years ago
- Affiliations: Seventh-day Adventist Church
- Academic affiliations: Adventist Educations
- Chairman: Samuel Y Bindosano
- President: Danny Ivan Rantung
- Students: 3,000+
- Undergraduates: 7 faculties
- Postgraduates: 2 undergraduate studies
- Location: Manado, North Sulawesi, Indonesia
- Campus: Universitas Klabat
- Colours: Purple
- Website: www.unklab.ac.id

Universitas Klabat is a Christian institution of higher learning located in Manado, North Sulawesi, Indonesia. It was established on 7 October 1965 by Gereja Masehi Advent Hari Ketujuh (GMAHK). (GMAHK is the official name for the Seventh-day Adventist Church in Indonesia.) At present, the university is run by Yayasan Universitas Klabat under the care of Uni Konfrens Indonesia Kawasan Timur (UKIKT) or the East Indonesia Union Conference (EIUC) of the SDA.

It is a part of the Seventh-day Adventist education system, the world's second largest Christian school system.

== Location ==
Universitas Klabat is in the North Sulawesi province of Indonesia, in Airmadidi, a town near Manado, the capital of North Sulawesi province. The university can be reached by public vehicles and takes about 30 minutes from Manado and the airport. The distance between Sam Ratulangi International Airport and Universitas Klabat is approximately 25km.

== Faculties ==
Universitas Klabat consists of the following faculties:

- Faculty of Philosophy
- Faculty of Science, Education, and Teaching
- Faculty of Economics
- Faculty of Agriculture
- Faculty of Computer Science
- Faculty of Nursing
- Faculty of Architectural Engineering
- Management Postgraduate Studies
- Theology Postgraduate Studies

== Ethical code ==
The teaching-learning process in the college is conducted in a religious environment. Christian values are respected and implemented by the institution.

== Rector ==
Universitas Klabat has been led by several rectors since its establishment. The following is a list of Universitas Klabat rectors from the initial period to the present:

Rector of Universitas Klabat
Name	Period	Description
Edward W. Higgins	1965 - 1975	1st. President of Universitas Klabat
Robert A. Kalangi	1975 - 1979	2nd. President of Universitas Klabat
John C. Pesulima	1979 - 1986	3rd. President of Universitas Klabat
Boaz J. Dompas	1987 - 1996	4th. President of Universitas Klabat
Sinjo J. Laoh	1996 - 2005	5th. President of Universitas Klabat
Alfriets B. Sepang	2006 - 2009	6th. President of Universitas Klabat
Amelius T. Mambu	2010 - 2017	7th. President of Universitas Klabat
Marthen Sengkey	2018 - 2021	8th. President of Universitas Klabat
Danny I. Rantung	2021 - Present	9th. President of Universitas Klabat

== See also ==
- List of Seventh-day Adventist colleges and universities
