= West Likupang =

West Likupang (Likupang Barat) is a district in the North Minahasa Regency, North Sulawesi, Indonesia with a population of 16,404

Within its boundaries is the village of Sonsilo.
