= Lembeh =

Island in Indonesia

- Location within Indonesia

Geography
- Location: Indonesia
- Coordinates: 1°26′N 125°14′E
- Area: 50 km^{2} (19 sq mi)
- Highest elevation: 432 m (1417 ft)

Administration
- Indonesia

Lembeh is an island off the north east coast of Sulawesi near the city of Bitung.

Lembeh Island is 25 km long and 2 km wide. Lembeh Island is separated from the mainland of Sulawesi by a narrow stretch of water known as the Lembeh Strait.

The Lembeh Strait is world-known for its extremely high density of rare and unusual marine life, in particular frogfish, rare species of octopus, seahorses and nudibranchs.

Lembeh Strait is a destination favoured by experienced scuba divers and underwater photographers from all over the world.

Due to the protected geographical features of Lembeh Strait, diving is available throughout the year and would be rarely cancelled due to bad weather.

Several resorts are available on Lembeh Island for divers from all over the world.
