= Kauditan =

District in North Minahasa Regency, North Sulawesi, Indonesia

- City
- City of Kauditan; Kota Kauditan
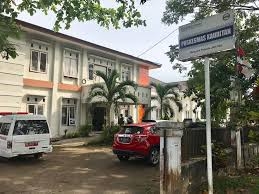
- Hospital in Kauditan
- Interactive map of Kauditan

Kauditan is a district in North Minahasa Regency, North Sulawesi Province, Indonesia. The list of villages in Kauditan district are:

- Kaasar
- Kaima
- Karegesan
- Kauditan Dua
- Kauditan Satu
- Kawiley
- Lembean
- Paslaten
- Treman
- Tumaluntung
- Watudambo
- Watudambo Dua
