= North Minahasa Regency =

Regency in North Sulawesi, Indonesia

North Minahasa Regency Kabupaten Minahasa Utara
- Regency
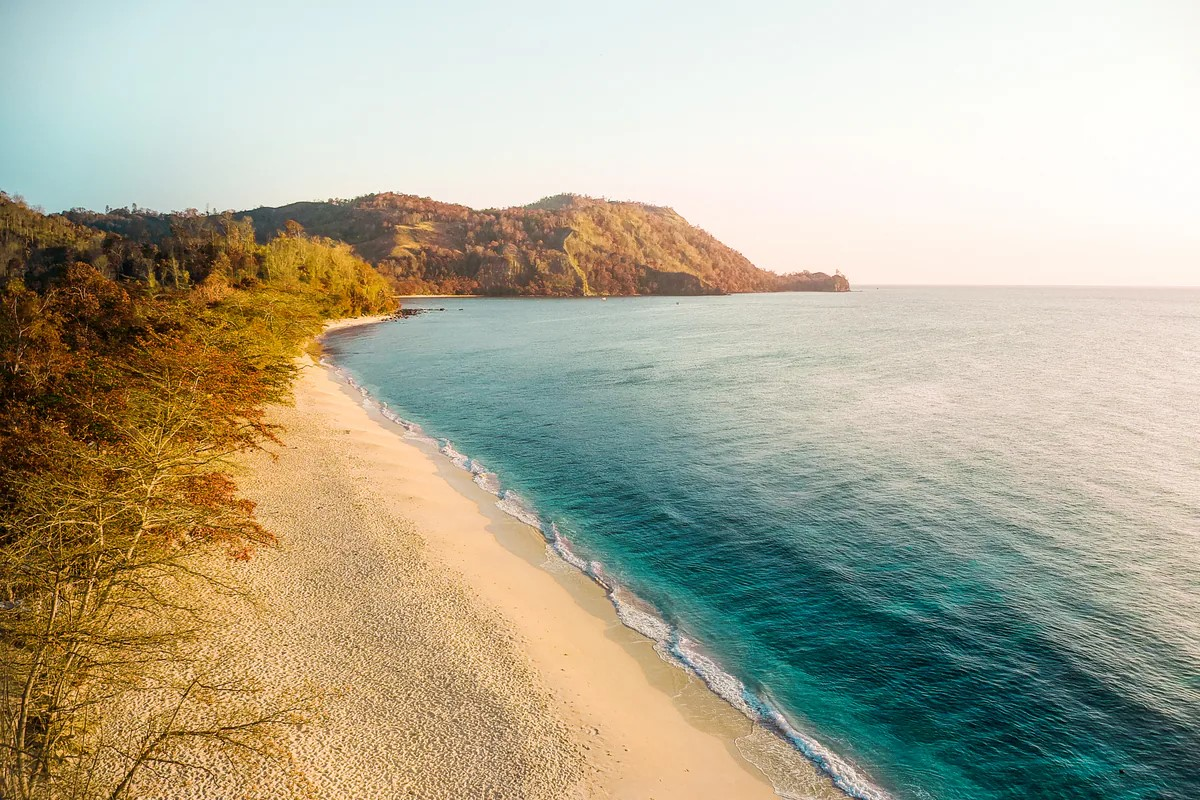
- Paal Beach in North Minahasa Regency

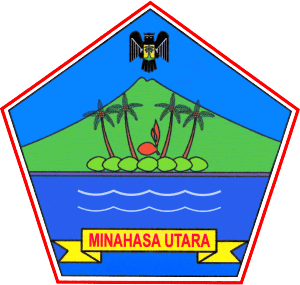
- Seal

- Location in North Sulawesi

- Location in Indonesia
- Coordinates: 1°24′9″N 124°57′36″E
- Country: Indonesia
- Province: North Sulawesi
- Established: 20 November 2003; 22 years ago
- Capital: Airmadidi

Government
  - Regent: Joune Ganda
  - Vice Regent: Kevin William Lotulung

Area
  - Total: 1,059.24 km^{2} (408.97 sq mi)

Population (mid 2025 estimate)
  - Total: 232,848
  - Density: 219.826/km^{2} (569.346/sq mi)
- Time zone: UTC+8 (WITA)
- Website: minutkab.go.id

North Minahasa Regency is a regency in North Sulawesi, Indonesia. Its capital is Airmadidi. It was originally part of the Minahasa Regency until it was split off and established as a separate regency on 20 November 2003. It covers an area of 1,059.24 km^{2}, and had a population of 188,904 at the 2010 Census; this had risen to 224,993 at the 2020 Census, and the official estimate as at mid 2025 was 232,848 (comprising 117,780 males and 115,068 females). The Regency includes the offshore islands of Bangka (Pulau Bangka) and Talisei (Pulau Talise) to the north of Sulawesi, and Mantenang (Pulau Mantehage) and Naeng Besar (Pulau Nain Besar) to the northwest.

== Administration ==
The regency is divided into ten districts (kecamatan), tabulated below with their areas and their populations from the 2010 Census and the 2020 Census, together with the official estimates as at mid 2025. The table also includes the locations of the administrative centres and the number of administrative villages in each district (totaling 125 rural desa and 6 urban kelurahan - the latter all in Airmadidi District), and its postal codes.

Kode Wilayah	Name of District (kecamatan)	Area in km^{2}	Pop'n Census 2010	Pop'n Census 2020	Pop'n Estimate mid 2025	Admin centre	No. of villages	Post codes
71.06.01	Kema ^{(a)}	78.76	15,009	17,774	17,932	Kema Satu	10	95379
71.06.02	Kauditan	108.20	23,620	28,643	29,508	Kauditan Satu	12	95372
71.06.03	Airmadidi	86.66	26,558	30,981	31,493	Airmadidi Atas	9 ^{(b)}	95371
71.06.08	Kalawat	39.03	26,675	32,784	32,882	Kolongan	12	95378
71.06.05	Dimembe	166.43	22,774	27,553	30,620	Dimembe	11	95373
71.06.09	Talawaan	82.51	17,678	22,360	21,793	Talawaan	12	95370
71.06.04	Wori ^{(c)}	90.70	17,980	20,749	21,523	Wori	20	95376
71.06.06	Likupang Barat ^{(d)} (West Likupang)	104.29	16,988	18,015	19,273	Serey	20	95377
71.06.07	Likupang Timur ^{(e)} (East Likupang)	290.84	16,519	20,340	21,688	Likupang Satu	18	95375
71.06.10	Likupang Selatan (South Likupang)	11.82	5,103	5,794	6,136	Kokoleh Satu	7	95374
	Totals	1,059.24	188,904	224,993	232,848	Airmadidi	131	

Notes: (a) including 10 small offshore islands. (b) comprises 6 kelurahan (Airmadidi Atas, Airmadidi Bawah, Rap-Rap, Sarongsong Dua, Sarongsong Satu and Sukur) and 3 desa.
(c) including offshore islands of Mantehage, Nain Besar, Nain Kecil, Bulu, Makelehi and Paniki to the west.
(d) including offshore islands of Talisei, Kelapa Dua and 10 smaller to the north. (e) including offshore islands of Bangka and 18 smaller to the north.
