= East Likupang =

East Likupang is a district in North Sulawesi, Indonesia, with a population of 15,905.
