= Bitung =

City in North Sulawesi, Indonesia

- City
- City of Bitung; Kota Bitung
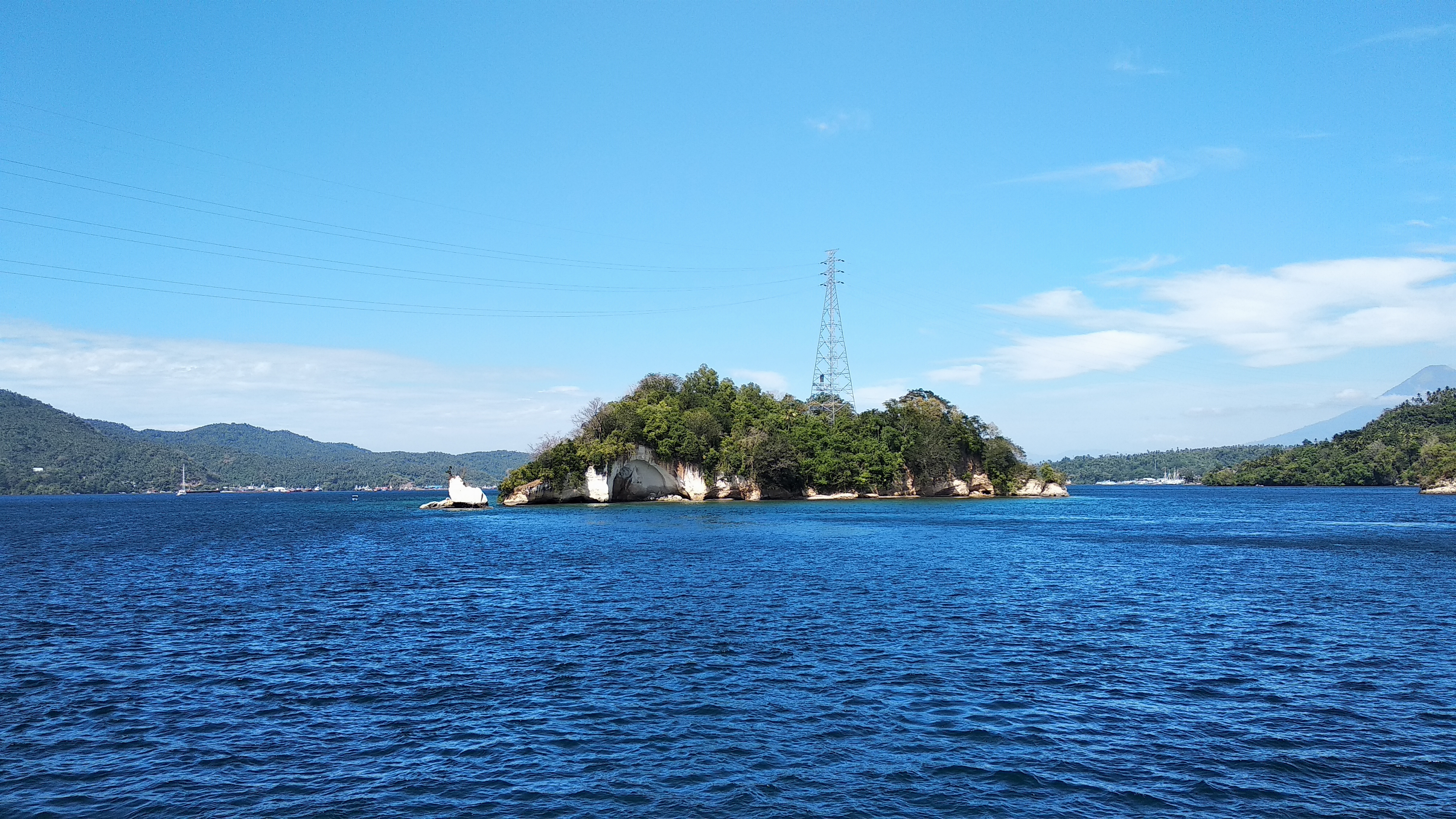
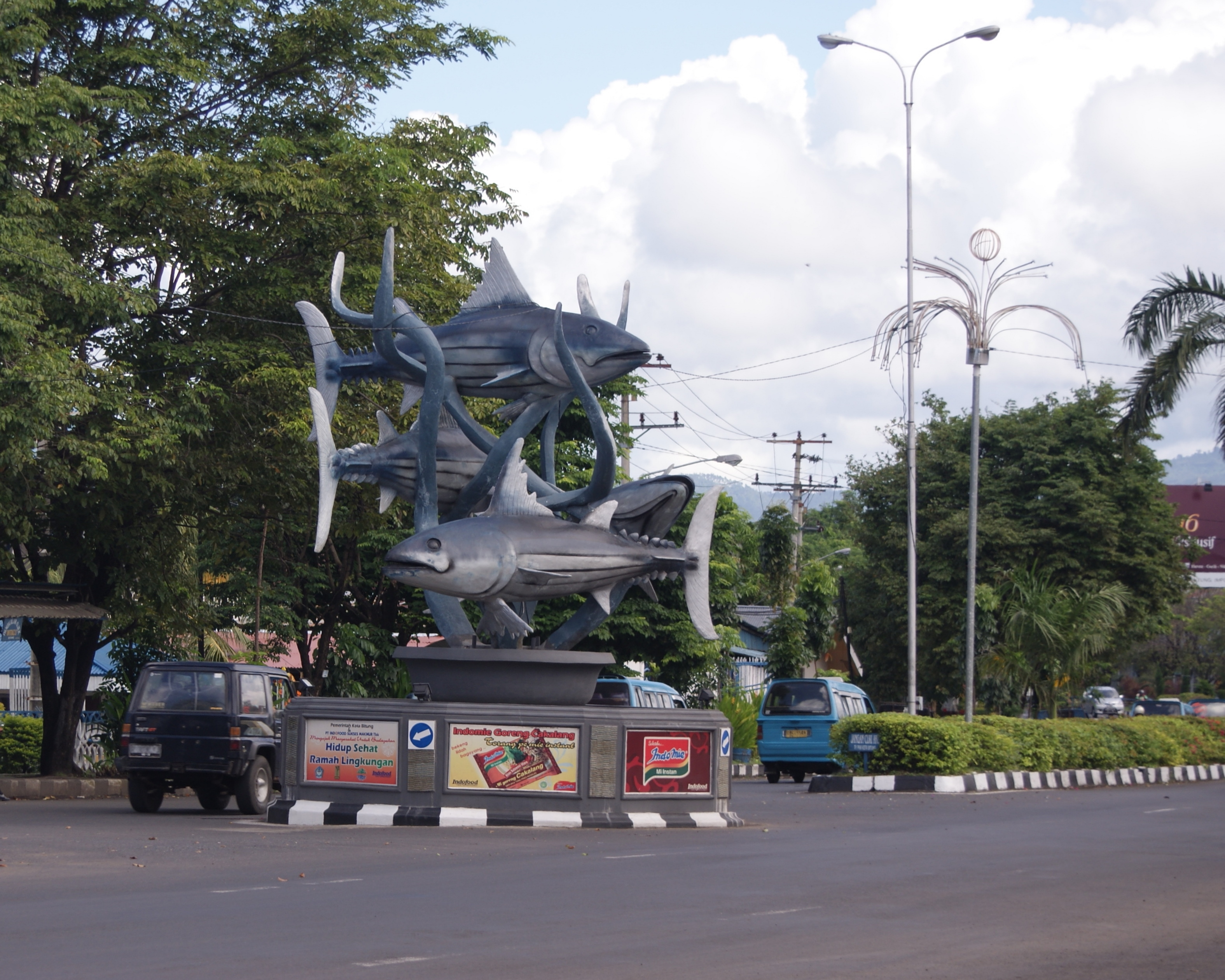
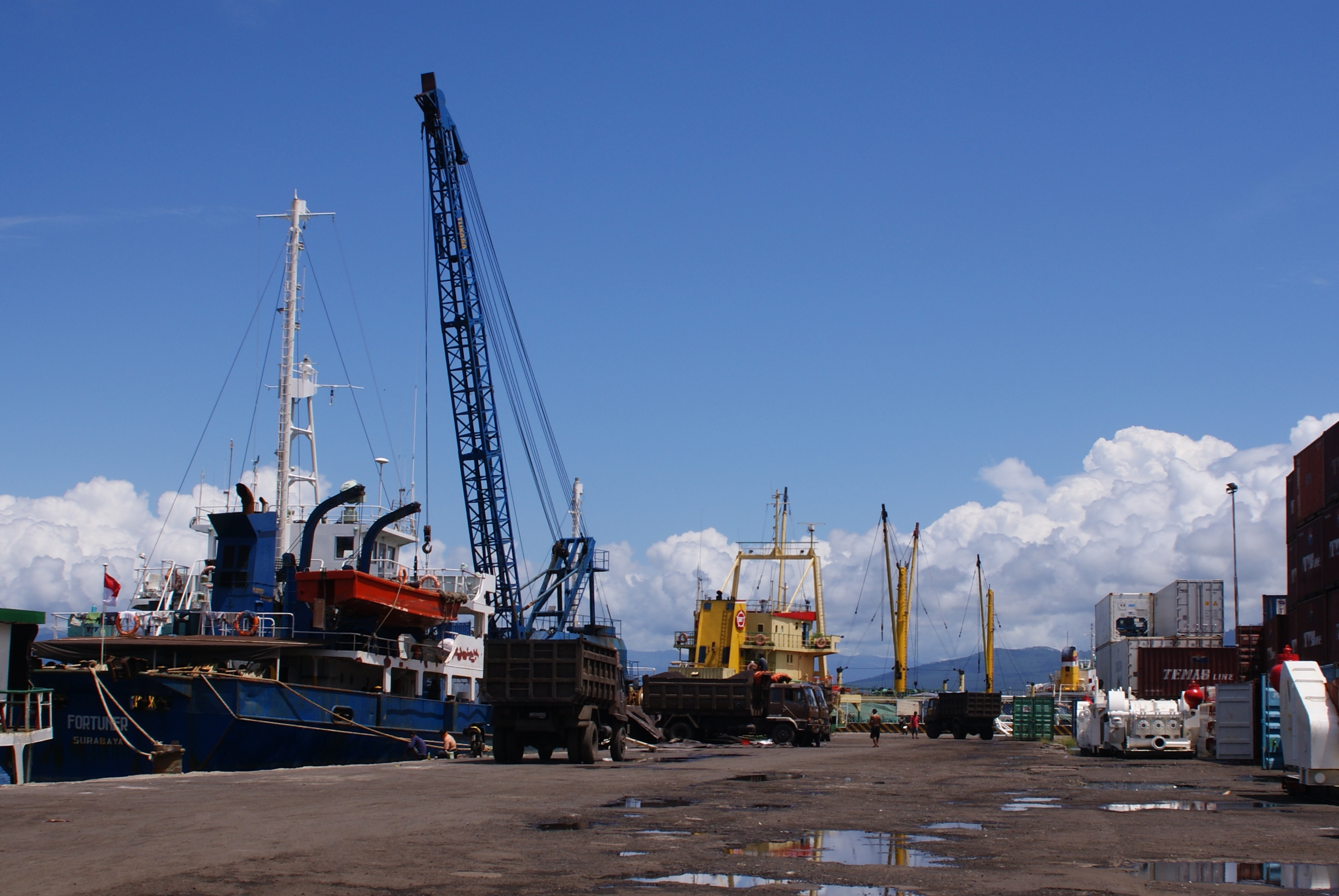
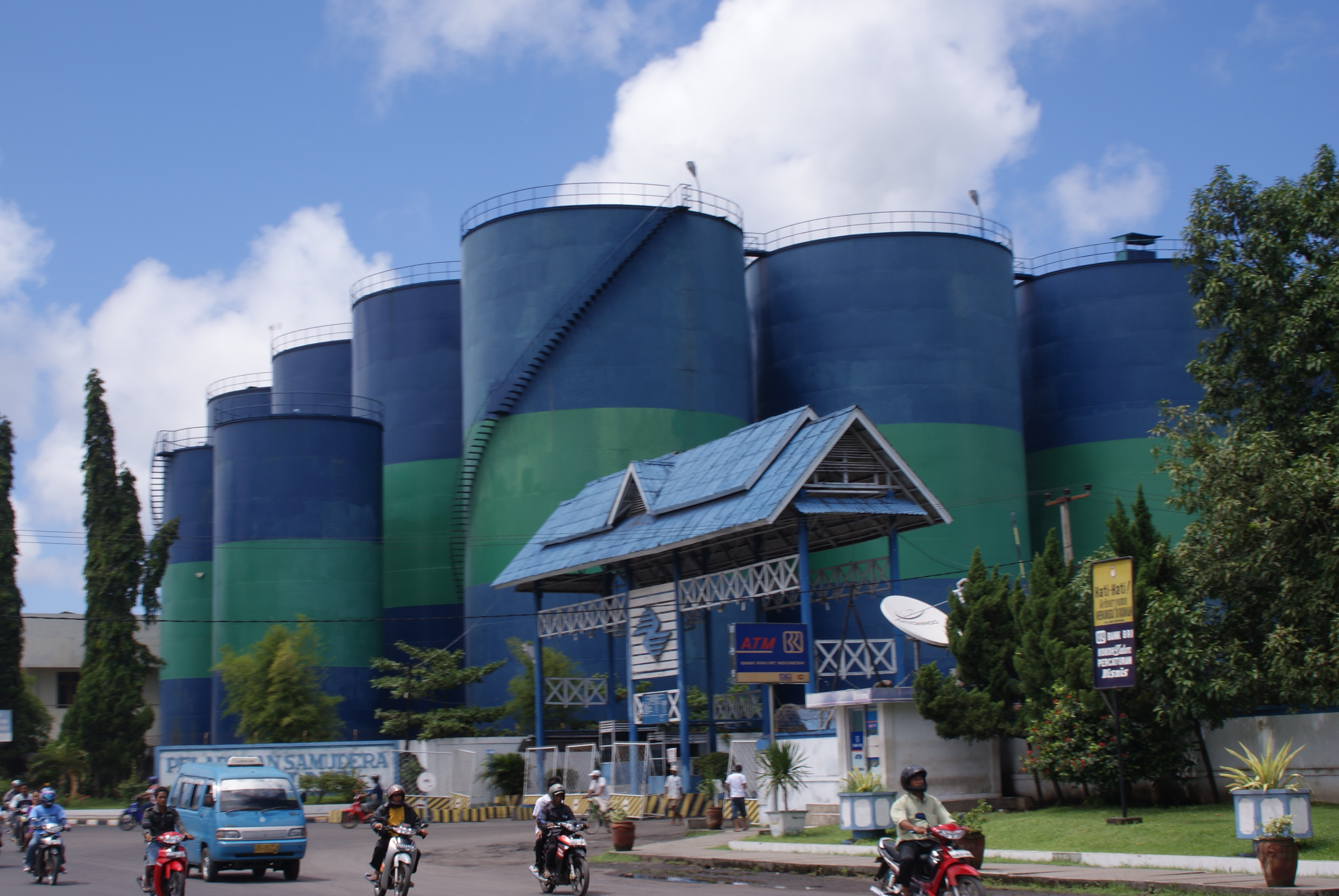
- Sarena Besar Island Cakalang Statue Port of Bitung Oil Refineries near the Port of Bitung

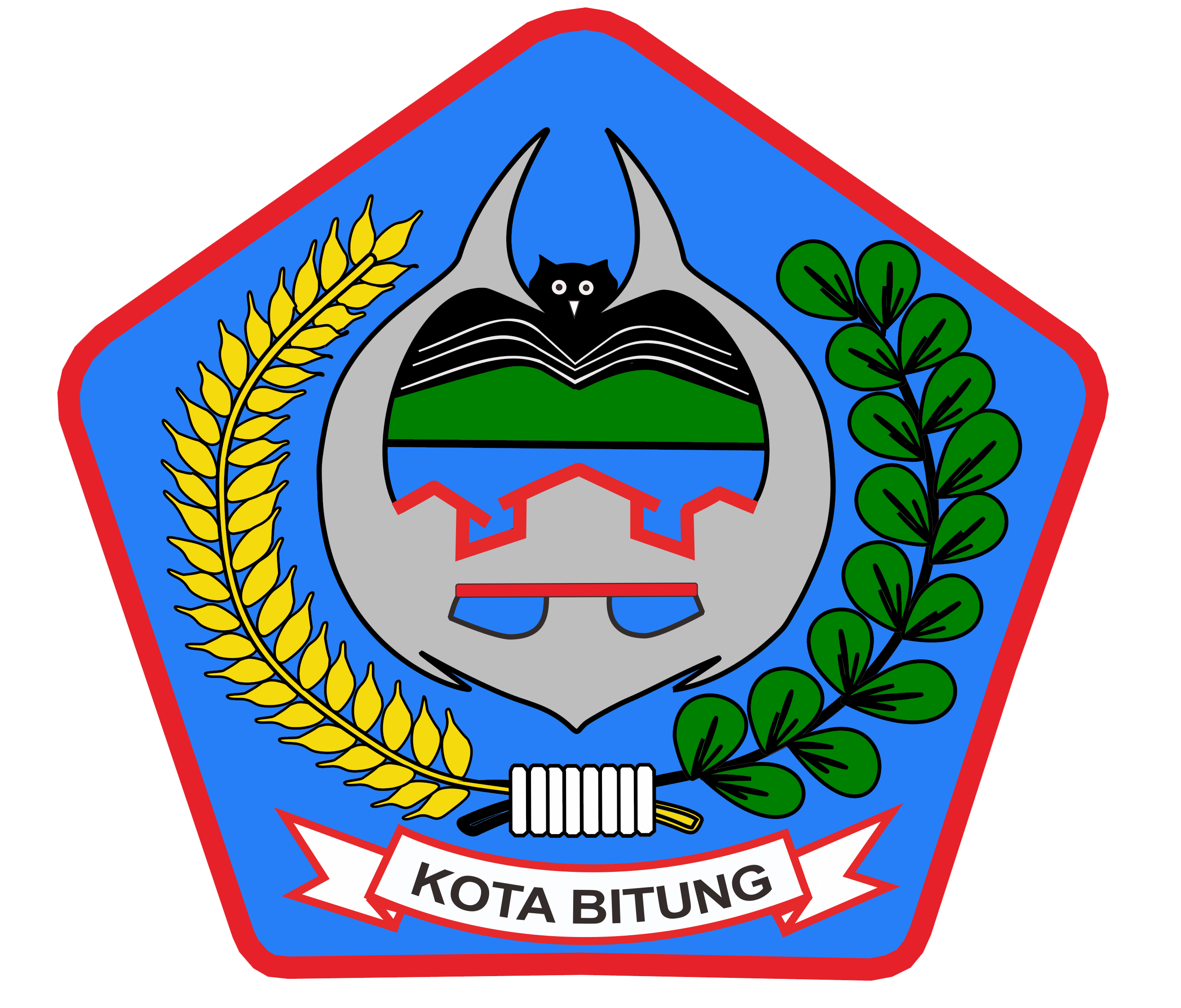
- Coat of arms

- Location within North Sulawesi
- Interactive map of Bitung
- Location in Sulawesi and Indonesia Bitung (Indonesia)
- Coordinates: 1°26′50″N 125°11′52″E
- Country: Indonesia
- Province: North Sulawesi
- Metropolitan area: Bimindo
- Established: 10 April 1975; 51 years ago as 'Administrative City of Bitung'; 15 August 1990; 36 years ago as 'Bitung City' (Kota Bitung)

Government
  - Mayor: Hengky Honandar
  - Vice Mayor: Randito Maringka

Area
  - Total: 329.72 km^{2} (127.31 sq mi)

Population (mid 2025 estimate)
  - Total: 217,504
  - Density: 659.66/km^{2} (1,708.5/sq mi)
- Time zone: UTC+8 (Indonesia Central Time)
  - Summer (DST): no DST
- Postcodes: 955xx
- Area code: (+62) 438
- Vehicle registration: DB
- Website: bitungkota.go.id

Bitung, officially the City of Bitung (Indonesian: Kota Bitung), is a coastal city at the north-eastern edge of the island of Sulawesi in Indonesia. Bitung is located in the province of North Sulawesi (Sulawesi Utara), and faces Lembeh Island (which forms two districts of the city), and the Lembeh Strait, which is known for its colourful marine life, in particular sea slugs. Bitung has a population of 187,932 at the 2010 Census, making it the second most populated city in the province after the capital Manado, rising to 225,134 at the 2020 Census; the official estimate as at mid 2025 was 217,504 (comprising 110,606 males and 106,898 females).

A number of development projects have been completed, or are currently undergoing centring around the city; these include the Bitung Special Economic Zone (SEZ), Manado–Bitung Toll Road, Bitung International Ocean Going Ship Port, and the Makassar-Bitung rail track; which will automatically make the city a gateway to the Pacific region.

== Administrative divisions ==
The city is divided into eight districts (kecamatan), tabulated below with their areas and their populations at the 2010 Census and the 2020 Census, together with the official estimates of population as at mid 2025. The table also includes the location of the district administrative centres, the number of administrative villages (urban kelurahan) in each district, and their post codes (kode pos).

Kode Wilayah	Name of District (kecamatan)	Area in km^{2}	Pop'n census 2010	Pop'n census 2020	Pop'n estimate mid 2025	Admin centre	No. of villages (kelurahan)	Post codes
71.72.02	Madidir ^{(a)}	20.83	33,482	36,323	35,057	Paceda	8	95513 - 95516, 95541
71.72.05	Matuari ^{(b)}	33.96	27,180	40,496	38,114	Manembo-nembo Tengah	8	95539, 95545: 95547
71.82.06	Girian	5.17	27,862	38,074	37,862	Girian Indah	7	95511, 95542 - 95544
71.72.01	Lembeh Selatan ^{(c)} (South Lembeh)	25.53	9,120	10,665	10,491	Papusungan	7	95551 - 95558
71.72.08	Lembeh Utara (North Lembeh)	27.66	8,509	9,525	9,376	Pintukota	10	95551 - 95559
71.72.04	Aertembaga ^{(d)}	33.09	28,262	29,994	29,391	Aertembaga Dua	10	95521 - 95529
71.72.07	Maesa	9.70	36,007	39,681	35,980	Bitung Barat Dua	8	95511 & 95512, 95521 - 95523
71.72.03	Ranowulu ^{(e)}	157.57	17,230	20,376	21,233	Danowudu	11	95531 - 95538
	Totals	329.72	187,932	225,134	217,504		69	—

Notes: (a) formerly Bitung Tengah (Central Bitung). (b) formerly Bitung Barat (West Bitung). (c) formerly Bitung Selatan (South Bitung); the district includes 15 offshore islands.
(d) formerly Bitung Timur (East Bitung). (e) formerly Bitung Utara (North Bitung); the district includes the offshore island of Pulau Powteng.

== Nature reserve ==
Tangkoko Batuangus Nature Reserve is two hours' drive away from Manado, and one hour from Bitung. Tarsius spectrum can be found easily in the nature reserve.

== Economy ==
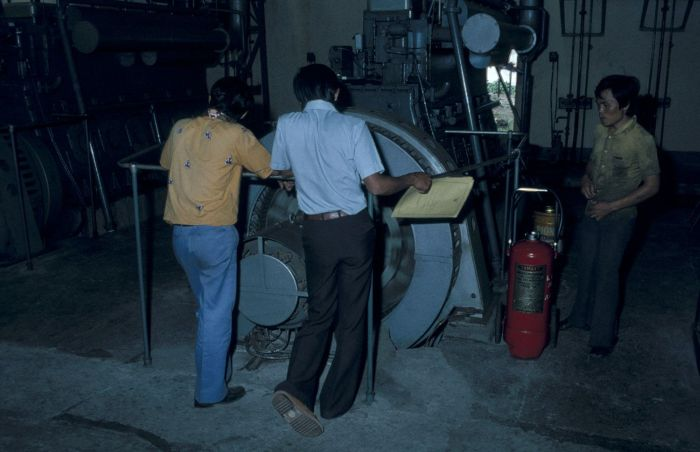
Coconut processing in Bitung

=== Bitung Special Economic Zone (SEZ) ===
Bitung was named as one of the country's Special Economic Zones in 2014. Priority sectors in the area are logistics, herbal pharmacy, fish processing and coconut processing. Based on Government Regulation No.32/2014 on Bitung SEZ, it will occupy an area of 534 hectares (1,320 acres). The SEZ is divided into three zones, namely industrial zone, logistics zone, and Export Processing Zone.

== Transport ==
=== Manado-Bitung Toll Road ===
On 16 January 2014, local authorities passed responsibility to acquire land for the Manado–Bitung Toll Road to the Public Works Ministry, although the initiation of works after the formality would take some time. The construction of the 39.9 kilometres (24.8 miles) toll road was expected to cost Rp 6.7 trillion (US$ 503 million). It was completed in early 2022, and formally opened on 25 February 2022.

=== Davao-Bitung Roll-On Roll-Off Ferry Service ===
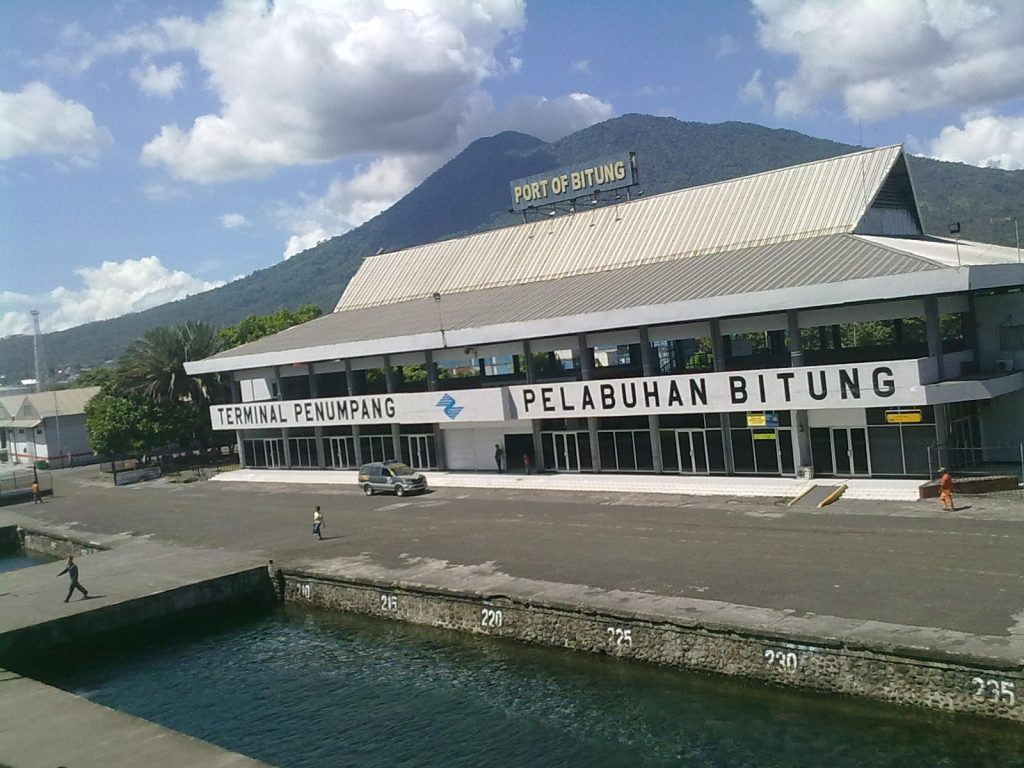
Port of Bitung

On 28 April 2017, Philippines President Rodrigo Duterte and Indonesia President Joko Widodo inaugurated the Davao-Bitung Roll-on Roll-Off Ferry Service that will allow journey time of just three days between two cities. The original shipping route from Davao City in Mindanao, Philippines, took up to five weeks, because ships first have to sail northwards to Manila, passing through South China Sea and Malaysia waters before it reaches various ports in Indonesia. Under the programme, there are 5 to 10 companies who will use the initial voyage of the Cebu-based Asia Marine Transport Corp.'s M/V Super Shuttle RORO 12 with a 500 TEU capacity. Among the goods to be traded include animal feeds, aqua products, charcoal, coffee beans, construction materials, copra, feed ingredients, fertilisers, food and beverages, fresh fruits, ice cream products, meats, peanuts, poultry (halal), soya, sugar, and synthetics. By 2019, however, the route had ceased operations due to a lack of demand caused by similarities in commodities produced by the two cities.

== Climate ==
Bitung has a tropical rainforest climate (Af) with heavy to very heavy rainfall year-round.

Climate data for Bitung
Month	Jan	Feb	Mar	Apr	May	Jun	Jul	Aug	Sep	Oct	Nov	Dec	Year
Mean daily maximum °C (°F)	29.4 (84.9)	29.5 (85.1)	29.7 (85.5)	30.7 (87.3)	30.8 (87.4)	30.9 (87.6)	30.9 (87.6)	31.5 (88.7)	31.6 (88.9)	31.6 (88.9)	30.8 (87.4)	29.9 (85.8)	30.6 (87.1)
Daily mean °C (°F)	25.8 (78.4)	25.9 (78.6)	26.1 (79.0)	26.5 (79.7)	26.7 (80.1)	26.7 (80.1)	26.6 (79.9)	26.8 (80.2)	26.7 (80.1)	26.8 (80.2)	26.6 (79.9)	26.2 (79.2)	26.5 (79.6)
Mean daily minimum °C (°F)	22.3 (72.1)	22.3 (72.1)	22.5 (72.5)	22.4 (72.3)	22.7 (72.9)	22.5 (72.5)	22.3 (72.1)	22.2 (72.0)	21.9 (71.4)	22.1 (71.8)	22.5 (72.5)	22.6 (72.7)	22.4 (72.2)
Average rainfall mm (inches)	387 (15.2)	319 (12.6)	277 (10.9)	249 (9.8)	233 (9.2)	203 (8.0)	155 (6.1)	124 (4.9)	137 (5.4)	165 (6.5)	263 (10.4)	331 (13.0)	2,843 (112)
Source: Climate-Data.org

== Notable people ==
- Dani Namangge, footballer

== See also ==
- 2023 Bitung clashes

== Media ==
- Media related to Bitung at Wikimedia Commons
- "Bitungtimes Indahnya Berbagi". Bitungtimes (in Indonesian). Archived from the original on 8 August 2013.
