= 2013 V.League 1 =

V.League 1
- Season: 2013
- Dates: 3 March – 31 August
- Champions: Hanoi T&T (2 titles)
- Champions League: Hanoi T&T
- AFC Cup: Vissai Ninh Binh
- Matches: 110
- Goals: 357 (3.25 per match)
- Top goalscorer: Gonzalo Damian Marronkle; Hoàng Vũ Samson (14 goals)
- Biggest home win: Sông Lam Nghệ An 8–0 Đồng Tâm Long An (30 June 2013)
- Biggest away win: Kienlongbank Kiên Giang 1–4 Sông Lam Nghệ An
- Highest scoring: Sông Lam Nghệ An 8–0 Đồng Tâm Long An (30 June 2013)
- Longest winning run: 4 matches Hoàng Anh Gia Lai (April 13 – June 26); Hà Nội T&T (May 12 – June 22)
- Longest unbeaten run: 10matches SHB Đà Nẵng (June 26 – August 3)
- Longest winless run: 7 matches Becamex Bình Dương (March 2 – May 5)
- Longest losing run: 5 matches Becamex Bình Dương (March 2 – April 20)
- Highest attendance: 30,000; Becamex Bình Dương 1–0 Sông Lam Nghệ An (4 August 2013)
- Lowest attendance: 1,000; Hanoi FC 4–1 Đồng Tâm Long An (27 May 2013)

The 2013 V.League 1 (known as the Eximbank V.League 1 for sponsorship reasons) season was the 30th season of Vietnam's national football league and the 13th as a professional league. The season began on 3 March 2013 and finished on 31 August 2013.

== Changes from last season ==
=== Team changes ===
The following teams have changed division since the 2012 season.

==== To V.League 1 ====
Promoted from V.League 2

- Đồng Nai
- Đồng Tâm Long An

==== From V.League 1 ====
Folded

- Hà Nội
- Khatoco Khánh Hòa F.C.
- Navibank Sài Gòn

Relegated

- TĐCS Đồng Tháp

=== Rule changes ===
After a 5-year absence, the AFC announced that the V.League 1 champions would be allowed to compete in the 2014 AFC Champions League playoff stage.

== Teams ==
Number of participating clubs in the 2013 campaign is 12.

Vicem Hải Phòng's relegation to the 2013 Vietnamese First Division season was confirmed on 29 July 2012. However, the club returned to the V.League for the 2013 season after purchasing Khatoco Khánh Hòa's slot, who later dissolved on 8 December 2012.

TĐCS Đồng Tháp were relegated after rivals Khatoco Khánh Hòa defeated Sông Lam Nghệ An 1–0 on 19 August 2012.

Đồng Tâm Long An (as Champions) and Hà Nội T&T B (as runners-up) secured direct promotion to the V.League from the 2012 Vietnamese First Division. Đồng Tâm Long An returned to the V.League after a one-season absence. However, Hà Nội T&T B remained in the second tier of Vietnamese football due to league rules about clubs with the same owners competing in the same division.

Hà Nội was dissolved on 27 November 2012 when club officials could not secure a new sponsor after the earlier arrest of Chairman Nguyễn Đức Kiên caused all sponsorship from his assets to be blocked. Navibank Sài Gòn was sold on 22 October 2012 after the title sponsor of the club announced a move away from sports, but the new owners announced on 5 December 2012 that the club would be dissolved before the start of the 2013 campaign., finally this club was dissolved.

On 8 December 2012, the VPF had stated that the Vietnam U-22 team would be added to the V.League to gain experience ahead of the 2013 SEA Games and to bring the participating number of clubs to 12. However, the Vietnam Football Federation announced on December 13, 2012 that 2012 Vietnamese First Division second runners-up Đồng Nai would be the twelfth club in the 2013 campaign.

=== Controversy ===
After Xuân Thành Sài Gòn was docked points for what the VFF deemed the club unsportsmanlike conduct when the club fielded a non-competitive squad for their Matchday 20 meeting with Sông Lam Nghệ An, club officials announced that the club would withdraw from the league. On 22 August 2013, the VFF approved Xuân Thành Sài Gòn's withdrawal request. Matches where the club was involved were vacated. As the result, no club among the remaining teams was relegated to the 2014 V.League 2.

=== Stadia and locations ===
Locations of the V-League 2013 teams

Club	Home stadium	Capacity
Becamex Bình Dương	Gò Đậu Stadium	18,250
SHB Đà Nẵng	Chi Lăng Stadium	28,000
Đồng Nai	Đồng Nai Stadium	25,000
Đồng Tâm Long An	Long An Stadium	19,975
Vicem Hải Phòng	Lạch Tray Stadium	28,000
Hà Nội T&T	Hàng Đẫy Stadium	22,000
Hoàng Anh Gia Lai	Pleiku Stadium	12,000
Kienlongbank Kiên Giang	Rạch Giá Stadium	10,000
Vissai Ninh Bình	Ninh Bình Stadium	22,000
Xuân Thành Sài Gòn	Thống Nhất Stadium	25,000
Sông Lam Nghệ An	Vinh Stadium	12,000
Thanh Hóa	Thanh Hóa Stadium	14,000

=== Personnel and kits ===
Note: Flags indicate national team as has been defined under FIFA eligibility rules. Players and Managers may hold more than one non-FIFA nationality.

Team	Manager	Captain	Kit manufacturer	Shirt sponsor
Becamex Bình Dương	(Vietnam) Lê Thụy Hải	(South Africa) Philani		Becamex IDC
SHB Đà Nẵng	(Vietnam) Lê Huỳnh Đức	(Vietnam) Nguyễn Minh Phương		Saigon-Hanoi Commercial Joint Stock Bank (SHB)
Đồng Nai	(Vietnam) Trần Bình Sự	(Vietnam) Phùng Quang Trung		
Đồng Tâm Long An	(Vietnam) Ngô Quang Sang (interim)	(Vietnam) Nguyễn Việt Thắng		Dongtam Group
Vicem Hải Phòng	(Vietnam) Hoàng Anh Tuấn	(Vietnam) Nguyễn Minh Châu	Adidas (fake)	Vietnam Cement Industry Corporation (Vicem)
Hà Nội T&T	(Vietnam) Phan Thanh Hùng	(Brazil) Cristiano Roland	Kappa	T&T Group
Hoàng Anh Gia Lai	(South Korea) Choi Yun-Kyum	(Vietnam) Phùng Văn Nhiên		HAGL Group
Kienlongbank Kiên Giang FC	(Vietnam) Lại Hồng Vân	(Vietnam) Phạm Đặng Duy An		Kienlongbank
The Vissai Ninh Bình	(Vietnam) Nguyễn Văn Sỹ	(Vietnam) Mai Tiến Thành		The Vissai Cement Group
Xuân Thành Sài Gòn FC	(Vietnam) Trần Tiến Đại	(Vietnam) Trương Đình Luật		Xuan Thanh Group
Sông Lam Nghệ An	(Vietnam) Nguyễn Hữu Thắng	(Vietnam) Nguyễn Trọng Hoàng		Bac A Bank
Thanh Hóa	(Vietnam) Mai Đức Chung	(Vietnam) Lê Bật Hiếu	Mitre	Viettel

=== Managerial changes ===
Team	Outgoing Head Coach	Date of vacancy	Manner of departure	Incoming Head Coach	Date of appointment
Vicem Hải Phòng	(Vietnam) Lê Thụy Hải	September 2012	Contract terminated	(Vietnam) Hoàng Anh Tuấn	10 January 2013
Thanh Hóa	(Vietnam) Triệu Quang Hà	2 February 2013	Contract terminated	(Vietnam) Mai Đức Chung	4 February 2013
Becamex Bình Dương	(South Korea) Cho Yoon-Hwan	15 April 2013	Sacked	(Vietnam) Lê Thụy Hải	16 April 2013
Đồng Tâm Long An	(Portugal) Francisco Vital	13 May 2013	Sacked	(Argentina) Marcelo Javier Zuleta	14 May 2013
Đồng Tâm Long An	(Argentina) Marcelo Javier Zuleta	9 July 2013	Sacked	(Vietnam) Ngô Quang Sang (interim)	9 July 2013

=== Foreign players ===
Club	Visa 1	Visa 2	Visa 3	Non-Visa Foreign
Becamex Bình Dương	(Togo) Vincent Bossou	(Nigeria) Sunday Emmanuel	(Nigeria) Aniekan Ekpe	(Brazil) Fabio dos Santos^{1,2} (Brazil) Kesley Alves^{1,2} (Brazil) Hélio^{1} (Brazil) Jeferson^{1}
SHB Đà Nẵng	(Romania) Sabin-Cosmin Goia	(Argentina) Gastón Merlo	(Tanzania) Danny Mrwanda	None
Đồng Nai	(Netherlands) Danny van Bakel	(Malawi) Victor Nyirenda	(Uganda) Henry Kisekka	(Cameroon) Thierry Bernard^{1} (Nigeria) Amaobi Uzowuru^{1}
Đồng Tâm Long An	(Nigeria) Anderson West	(Brazil) Gilson Campos	(Brazil) Ernesto Paulo	(Uganda) Isaac Mylyanga^{1}
Vicem Hải Phòng	(Brazil) Antonio Carlos	(Brazil) Giba	(Zimbabwe) Justice Majabvi	(Ghana) Issifu Ansah^{1} (Ghana) Jonathan Quartey^{3}
Hà Nội T&T	(Brazil) Cristiano Roland	(Argentina) Gonzalo Marronkle	(Nigeria) Samson Kayode	None
Hoàng Anh Gia Lai	(Nigeria) Ganiyu Oseni	(Brazil) Evaldo	(Nigeria) Bassey Akpan	(Thailand) Đoàn Văn Sakda^{3} (Brazil) Marcelo^{1}
Kienlongbank Kiên Giang	(Nigeria) Felix Ajala	(Nigeria) Hamed Adesope	(Brazil) Jackson	None
Vissai Ninh Bình	(Nigeria) Peter Omoduemuke	(Nigeria) Timothy Anjembe	(Ivory Coast) Moussa Sanogo	(Brazil) Rodrigo Mota^{1} (Nigeria) Dio Preye^{1}
Xuân Thành Sài Gòn	(Uganda) Moses Oloya	(Cameroon) Christian Amougou	(Nigeria) Emeka Oguwike	(Brazil) Rogerio^{1} (Nigeria) Maxwell Eyerakpo^{1}
Sông Lam Nghệ An	(Trinidad and Tobago) Hughton Hector	(Trinidad and Tobago) Willis Plaza	(Jamaica) Kavin Bryan	None
Thanh Hóa	(Senegal) Cheikh Dieng	(Slovenia) Nastja Čeh	(Democratic Republic of the Congo) Patiyo Tambwe	None

Note:
^{1}Those players who were born and started their professional career abroad but have since gained Vietnamese Residency;
^{2}Foreign residents who have chosen to represent Vietnam national team;
^{3}Vietnamese residents who have chosen to represent another national team

== League table ==
Pos	Team	Pld	W	D	L	GF	GA	GD	Pts	Qualification or relegation
1	Hà Nội T&T (C)	20	11	5	4	46	24	+22	38	2014 AFC Champions League Play-off stage
2	SHB Đà Nẵng	20	10	5	5	29	24	+5	35	
3	Hoàng Anh Gia Lai	20	10	5	5	24	16	+8	35	
4	Sông Lam Nghệ An	20	9	6	5	40	24	+16	33	
5	Thanh Hóa	20	9	6	5	40	33	+7	33	
6	Hải Phòng	20	7	5	8	39	28	+11	26	
7	Đồng Nai	20	6	7	7	27	36	−9	25	
8	Becamex Bình Dương	20	6	5	9	34	35	−1	23	
9	Đồng Tâm Long An	20	7	1	12	31	53	−22	22	
10	Vissai Ninh Bình	20	4	6	10	23	32	−9	18	2014 AFC Cup Group stage (Note: Vissai Ninh Binh champions Vietnamese Cup 2013)
11	Kienlongbank Kiên Giang	20	3	5	12	24	52	−28	14	
12	Xuân Thành Sài Gòn (R)	0	0	0	0	0	0	0	0 (Note: XM Xuân Thành Sài Gòn withdraw V League 2013 after round 20.)	Relegation to the 2014 Vietnam Third Division

Updated to match(es) played on 31 August 2013. Source:
Rules for classification: 1) points; 2) goal difference; 3) number of goals scored.
(C) Champions; (R) Relegated

== Results ==
=== Summary ===
Home \ Away	BBD	SDN	ĐN	ĐLA	VHP	T&T	HGL	KKG	VNB	SNA	THO
Becamex Bình Dương		0–2	1–1	1–2		3–1	0–0	6–0	0–0	2–1	3–4
SHB Đà Nẵng	1–1		0–0	2–0	1–0	1–0	1–1	2–0	2–0	3–2	2–1
Đồng Nai	1–2	4–1		3–1	2–2	0–4	2–2	1–2	1–0	2–1	2–1
Đồng Tâm Long An	2–5	3–2	1–3		1–0	1–2	1–0	3–2	2–1	1–3	1–1
Hải Phòng	1–2	1–0	4–0	3–4		2–3	0–1	3–0	4–0	1–1	1–1
Hà Nội T&T	4–1	1–2	6–1	4–1	3–3		2–0	5–0	1–0	2–2	3–2
Hoàng Anh Gia Lai	2–0	2–2	1–0	2–0	1–0	1–1		2–1	2–0	2–1	1–3
Kienlongbank Kiên Giang	4–2	0–1	1–1	3–2	1–5	1–1	0–3		2–2	1–4	2–2
Vissai Ninh Bình	2–2	4–1	1–1	3–4	3–2	2–0	0–1	1–0		1–1	3–3
Sông Lam Nghệ An	3–2	2–1	1–1	8–0	2–1	0–0	1–0	2–2	2–0		2–0
Thanh Hóa	2–1	2–2	4–1	3–1	2–2	1–3	1–0	4–2	1–0	2–1	

Updated to match(es) played on 31 August 2013. Source: Eximbank V-League
Legend: Blue = home team win; Yellow = draw; Red = away team win.

=== Details ===
==== Match-day 1 ====
2 March 2013
16:00

Hà Nội T&T	2–0	Hoàng Anh Gia Lai
Marronkle 29'; Kayode 80'; Sỹ Cường (red card) 90+4'	Report

Hàng Đẫy Stadium, Hà Nội
Attendance: 3,000
Referee: Nguyễn Văn Kiên

2 March 2013
16:30

Đồng Tâm Long An	1–1	Thanh Hóa
Campos 82' (pen.)	Report	Anh Tuấn 65'

Long An Stadium
Attendance: 8,000
Referee: Hoàng Phạm Công Khánh

2 March 2013
17:00

Xi Măng Xuân Thành Sài Gòn	1–0	Becamex Bình Dương
Abdullahi 28'; Ngọc Anh (yellow card) 76' (yellow-red card) 80'	Report

Thống Nhất Stadium, Hồ Chí Minh
Attendance: 6,000
Referee: Hoàng Anh Tuấn

3 March 2013
16:00

Đồng Nai	1–0	Vissai Ninh Bình
N'Gale 4'	Report

Đồng Nai Stadium, Biên Hòa
Attendance: 10,000
Referee: Nguyễn Trọng Thư

3 March 2013
16:30

SHB Đà Nẵng	2−0	Kienlongbank Kiên Giang
Quốc Anh 53'; Goia 55'	Report	Adesope (red card) 87'

Chi Lăng Stadium, Đà Nẵng
Attendance: 16,000
Referee: Trần Trung Hiếu

3 March 2013
17:00

Sông Lam Nghệ An	2–1	Vicem Hải Phòng
Công Vinh 25'; Plaza 53'; Trọng Hoàng (yellow card) 58' (yellow-red card) 63'	Report	Carlos 74' (pen.)

Vinh Stadium
Attendance: 15,000
Referee: Đinh Hải Dương

==== Match-day 2 ====
9 March 2013
16:00

Kienlongbank Kiên Giang	1–4	Sông Lam Nghệ An
Felix 12'	Report	Văn Hoàn 25'; Hector 33'; Plaza 56'; Công Vinh 85'

Rạch Giá Stadium
Attendance: 5,000
Referee: Hoàng Phạm Công Khánh

9 March 2013
17:00

Becamex Bình Dương	0–2	SHB Đà Nẵng
	Report	Merlo 40', 68'

Gò Đậu Stadium, Thủ Dầu Một
Attendance: 8,000
Referee: Nguyễn Đức Vũ

9 March 2013
17:00

Vissai Ninh Bình	2–0	Hà Nội T&T
Mạnh Dũng 19'; Tiến Thành 26'	Report

Ninh Bình Stadium
Attendance: 5,000
Referee: Võ Minh Trí

10 March 2013
16:00

Thanh Hóa	4–1	Đồng Nai
Tambwe 20'; Dieng 31', 61', 73'; Văn Thắng (yellow card) 35' (yellow-red card) 57'	Report	Henry 12' van Bakel (red card) 79'

Thanh Hóa Stadium
Attendance: 11,000
Referee: Ngô Quốc Hưng

10 March 2013
16:00

Hoàng Anh Gia Lai	2–0	Đồng Tâm Long An
Oseni 7'; Evaldo 73'	Report

Pleiku Stadium
Attendance: 10,000
Referee: Phùng Đình Dũng

14 March 2013
16:00

Vicem Hải Phòng	2–1	Xi Măng Xuân Thành Sài Gòn
Fortuno 63'; Hữu Phát 79'	Report	Geoffrey 32'

Lạch Tray Stadium, Hải Phòng
Attendance: 13,000
Referee: Nguyễn Đức Vũ

==== Match-day 3 ====
29 March 2013
16:00

SHB Đà Nẵng	0–0	Xi Măng Xuân Thành Sài Gòn
	Report	Việt Cường (yellow card) 45+2' (yellow-red card)

Chi Lăng Stadium, Đà Nẵng
Attendance: 15,000
Referee: Nguyễn Văn Kiên

30 March 2013
16:00

Thanh Hóa	1–0	Hoàng Anh Gia Lai
Tambwe 8'	Report

Thanh Hóa Stadium
Attendance: 10,000
Referee: Đinh Hải Dương

30 March 2013
16:00

Vicem Hải Phòng	3–0	Kienlongbank Kiên Giang
Antonio Carlos 60', 90+2'; Quang Hải 87'	Report

Lạch Tray Stadium, Hải Phòng
Attendance: 12,000
Referee: Nguyễn Đức Vũ

31 March 2013
16:00

Hà Nội T&T	6–1	Đồng Nai
Marronkle 16'; Thành Lương 20'; Kayode 33', 61'; Văn Quyết 66', 77'	Report	Đức Nhân 48'

Hàng Đẫy Stadium, Hà Nội
Attendance: 1,500
Referee: Ngô Quốc Hưng

31 March 2013
16:30

Đồng Tâm Long An	2–1	Vissai Ninh Bình
Gilson Campos 42'; Lê Isaac 87'	Report	Sanogo 71'

Long An Stadium, Tân An
Attendance: 6,000
Referee: Bùi Thành Thanh Nghĩa

31 March 2013
17:00

Sông Lam Nghệ An	3–2	Becamex Bình Dương
Công Vinh 3', 61'; Plaza 47'	Report	Anh Đức 15'; Kesley Alves 55'

Vinh Stadium
Attendance: 8,000
Referee: Nguyễn Trọng Thư

==== Match-day 4 ====
6 April 2013
17:00

Vissai Ninh Bình	3–3	Thanh Hóa
Sannogo 7'; Văn Ta 9', 90+5'; Quốc Phương (yellow card) 68' (yellow-red card)	Report	Dieng 28'; Văn Thắng 35'; Tambwe 83'

Ninh Bình Stadium
Attendance: 7,000
Referee: Hoàng Phạm Công Khánh

6 April 2013
17:00

Becamex Bình Dương	0–2	Vicem Hải Phòng
	Report	Carlos 71'; Fortuno 85'

Gò Đậu Stadium, Thủ Dầu Một
Attendance: 8,000
Referee: Võ Minh Trí

7 April 2013
16:00

Hà Nội T&T	2–2	Sông Lam Nghệ An
Gonzalo 67', 79'	Report	Trọng Hoàng 8'; Hector 87'

Hàng Đẫy Stadium, Hà Nội
Attendance: 20,000
Referee: Nguyễn Đức Vũ

7 April 2013
16:00

Đồng Nai	2–2	Hoàng Anh Gia Lai
Thierry 87', 90+2'	Report	Evaldo 21'; Oseni 47'; Thanh Vân (yellow card) 12' (yellow-red card)

Đồng Nai Stadium, Biên Hòa
Attendance: 10,000
Referee: Đinh Hải Dương

23 May 2013
16:30

SHB Đà Nẵng	2–0	Đồng Tâm Long An
Minh Phương 40'; Hùng Sơn 87'	Report

Chi Lăng Stadium, Đà Nẵng
Attendance: 10,000
Referee: Nguyễn Văn Kiên

26 June 2013
18:00

Xi Măng Xuân Thành Sài Gòn	4–2	Kienlongbank Kiên Giang
Oloya 35'; Ngọc Anh 44'; Max 50'; Amougou 90'	Report	Tuấn Hiệp 13'; Ajala 18'

Thống Nhất Stadium, Hồ Chí Minh City
Attendance: 3,000
Referee: Nguyễn Trọng Thư

==== Match-day 5 ====
13 April 2013
16:00

Kienlongbank Kiên Giang	2–2	Vissai Ninh Bình
Ajala 22', 63'	Report	Sanogo 15'; Tiến Thành 55'

Rạch Giá Stadium
Attendance: 5,000
Referee: Nguyễn Văn Kiên

13 April 2013
16:00

Hoàng Anh Gia Lai	2–0	Becamex Bình Dương
Evaldo 53'; Oseni 83'	Report

Pleiku Stadium
Attendance: 5,000
Referee: Phùng Đình Dũng

13 April 2013
17:00

Thanh Hóa	1–3	Hà Nội T&T
Čeh 21'	Report	Gonzalo 71'; Quốc Long 74'; Kayode 79'

Thanh Hóa Stadium
Attendance: 12,000
Referee: Bùi Thành Thanh Nghĩa

14 April 2013
16:00

Vicem Hải Phòng	1–0	SHB Đà Nẵng
Quang Hải 45'	Report

Lạch Tray Stadium, Hải Phòng
Attendance: 22,000
Referee: Nguyễn Quốc Hùng

14 April 2013
16:30

Đồng Tâm Long An	1–3	Đồng Nai
Gilson Campos 77'; Ebimo (yellow card) 42' (yellow-red card)	Report	Khánh Thành 24'; Ngọc Quốc 51'; Đình Hiệp 90+5'; Thanh Diệp (yellow card) 87' (yellow-red card)

Long An Stadium, Tân An
Attendance: 7,000
Referee: Nguyễn Trọng Thư

14 April 2013
18:00

Sông Lam Nghệ An	1–0	Xi Măng Xuân Thành Sài Gòn
Công Vinh 84'	Report

Vinh Stadium
Attendance: 23,000
Referee: Hoàng Anh Tuấn

==== Match-day 6 ====
19 April 2013
16:00

SHB Đà Nẵng	1–0	Hà Nội T&T
Merlo 57'	Report

Chi Lăng Stadium, Đà Nẵng
Attendance: 12,000
Referee: Đinh Văn Dũng

19 April 2013
18:00

Xi Măng Xuân Thành Sài Gòn	1–3	Đồng Nai
Oladoja 56'	Report	Henry 56', 63'; Victor 90+4'

Thống Nhất Stadium, Hồ Chí Minh
Attendance: 6,000
Referee: Võ Quang Vinh

20 April 2013
16:00

Hoàng Anh Gia Lai	2–1	Kienlongbank Kiên Giang
Oseni 18', 82'	Report	Kiên Trung 45+1'

Pleiku Stadium
Attendance: 5,000
Referee: Nguyễn Đức Vũ

20 April 2013
17:00

Vissai Ninh Bình	2–2	Becamex Bình Dương
Văn Ta 22'; Anjembe 41'	Report	Anh Đức 3'; Quang Vinh 90'

Ninh Bình Stadium
Attendance: 5,000
Referee: Phùng Đình Dũng

21 April 2013
16:30

Đồng Tâm Long An	1–3	Sông Lam Nghệ An
Việt Thắng 85'; Đình Vinh (yellow card) 76' (yellow-red card) 82'	Report	Hector 21'; Ngọc Hải 80'; Trọng Hoàng 90+1'

Long An Stadium, Tân An
Attendance: 10,000
Referee: Hoàng Phạm Công Khánh

21 April 2013
17:00

Thanh Hóa	2–2	Vicem Hải Phòng
Văn Thắng 35'; Dieng 45+1'	Report	Antonio Carlos 6', 73'; Thanh Tuấn (red card) 90+3'

Thanh Hóa Stadium
Attendance: 11,000
Referee: Trần Trung Hiếu

==== Match-day 7 ====
27 April 2013
16:00

Kienlongbank Kiên Giang	2–2	Thanh Hóa
Minh Trung 4'; Felix 34'	Report	Dieng 1'; Čeh 54'; Bật Hiếu (yellow card) 57' (yellow-red card) 90+3'

Rạch Giá Stadium
Attendance: 6,000
Referee: Võ Quang Vinh

27 April 2013
16:00

Vicem Hải Phòng	0–1	Hoàng Anh Gia Lai
	Report	Evaldo Goncalves 80'

Lạch Tray Stadium, Hải Phòng
Attendance: 18,000
Referee: Phùng Đình Dũng

28 April 2013
17:00

Becamex Bình Dương	1–2	Đồng Tâm Long An
Anh Đức 90+1'	Report	Tấn Tài 35'; Việt Thắng 84'

Gò Đậu Stadium, Thủ Dầu Một
Attendance: 5,000
Referee: Trần Trung Hiếu

28 April 2013
17:00

Sông Lam Nghệ An	2–0	Vissai Ninh Bình
Bryan 7', 76'	Report

Vinh Stadium
Attendance: 16,000
Referee: Nguyễn Văn Kiên

24 July 2013
16:00

Đồng Nai	4–1	SHB Đà Nẵng
Nyirenda 36'; Ngọc Quốc 59'; Đình Hiệp 76'; Hữu Thắng 87'	Report	Minh Phương 32'; Minh Phương (red card) 45+1'

Đồng Nai Stadium, Biên Hòa
Attendance: 12,000
Referee: Nguyễn Quốc Hùng

24 July 2013
18:00

Xi Măng Xuân Thành Sài Gòn	3–3	Hà Nội T&T
Tài Em 5'; Rogerio 12' (pen.), 42' (pen.)	Report	Văn Quyết 22'; Kayode 29'; Văn Hiếu 51'

Thống Nhất Stadium, Hồ Chí Minh
Attendance: 4,000
Referee: Ngô Quốc Hưng

==== Match-day 8 ====
4 May 2013
16:00

Kienlongbank Kiên Giang	3–2	Đồng Tâm Long An
Minh Trung 14'; Suleiman 30', 57'	Report	Gilson Campos 13'; Việt Thắng 26'

Rạch Giá Stadium
Attendance: 2,500
Referee: Bùi Thành Thanh Nghĩa

4 May 2013
16:00

Hoàng Anh Gia Lai	2–1	Sông Lam Nghệ An
Hoàng Thiên 77'; Hữu Long 90+3'	Report	Hector 33'

Pleiku Stadium
Attendance: 8,000
Referee: Ngô Quốc Hưng

4 May 2013
16:00

Đồng Nai	2–2	Vicem Hải Phòng
Nyirenda 27'; Kisekka 30'	Report	Văn Tân 5'; Hữu Phát 22'

Lạch Tray Stadium, Hải Phòng
Attendance: 10,000
Referee: Nguyễn Trọng Thư

5 May 2013
16:00

Vissai Ninh Bình	4–1	SHB Đà Nẵng
Sanogo 57', 63', 66', 80'; Ngọc Lung (yellow card) 29' (yellow-red card) 73'	Report	Minh Tuấn 37'

Ninh Bình Stadium
Attendance: 7,500
Referee: Hoàng Anh Tuấn

5 May 2013
17:00

Becamex Bình Duong	3–1	Hà Nội T&T
Philani 21'; Sunday 33', 46'	Report	Gonzalo 28'

Gò Đậu Stadium, Thủ Dầu Một
Attendance: 12,000
Referee: Hoàng Phạm Công Khánh

5 May 2013
18:00

Xi Măng Xuân Thành Sài Gòn	2–1	Thanh Hóa
Nsi 39', 54'	Report	Văn Robert 60'

Thống Nhất Stadium, Hồ Chí Minh
Attendance: 6,000
Referee: Võ Quang Vinh

==== Match-day 9 ====
10 May 2013
16:00

Vissai Ninh Bình	3–3	Xi Măng Xuân Thành Sài Gòn
Anjembe 30'; Tiến Thành 74'; Sanogo 90+3'	Report	Geoffrey 34'; Nsi 73', 81'

Ninh Bình Stadium
Attendance: 3,000
Referee: Phùng Đình Dũng

10 May 2013
16:30

Đồng Tâm Long An	1–2	Vicem Hải Phòng
Campos 31'	Report	Carlos 16', 62'

Long An Stadium, Tân An
Attendance: 4,000
Referee: Nguyễn Văn Kiên

11 May 2013
17:00

Thanh Hóa	2–1	Sông Lam Nghệ An
Dieng 54'; Xuân Tú 66'	Report	Bryan 60'

Thanh Hóa Stadium
Attendance: 12,000
Referee: Trần Trung Hiếu

12 May 2013
16:00

Hà Nội T&T	5–0	Kienlongbank Kiên Giang
Kayode 24', 65'; Marronkle 62', 90'; Ngọc Duy 73'	Report

Hàng Đẫy Stadium, Hà Nội
Attendance: 4,000
Referee: Nguyễn Trọng Thư

12 May 2013
16:00

Đồng Nai	1–2	Becamex Bình Dương
Kisekka 13'	Report	Vũ Phong 40'; Thành Trung 51'; Vũ Phong (yellow card) 65' (yellow-red card) 66'

Đồng Nai Stadium, Biên Hòa
Attendance: 19,000
Referee: Bùi Thành Thanh Nghĩa

26 June 2013
16:00

SHB Đà Nẵng	1–1	Hoàng Anh Gia Lai
Quốc Anh 52'	Report	Evaldo 90'

Chi Lăng Stadium, Đà Nẵng
Attendance: 15,000
Referee: Đinh Anh Dũng

==== Match-day 10 ====
18 May 2013
16:00

Kienlongbank Kiên Giang	4–2	Becamex Bình Dương
Minh Trung 26', 66' (pen.); Ajala 36'; Suleiman 88'	Report	Anh Đức 2'; Ekpe 45+3'

Rạch Giá Stadium
Attendance: 6,000
Referee: Võ Minh Trí

18 May 2013
17:00

Sông Lam Nghệ An	1–1	Đồng Nai
Công Vinh 15'	Report	Kisekka 84'

Vinh Stadium
Attendance: 11,000
Referee: Phùng Đình Dũng

18 May 2013
16:00

Hoàng Anh Gia Lai	2–0	Vissai Ninh Bình
Oseni 3', 39'; Oseni (yellow card) 10' (yellow-red card) 58'	Report

Pleiku Stadium
Attendance: 9,000
Referee: Võ Quang Vinh

19 May 2013
17:00

Vicem Hải Phòng	2–3	Hà Nội T&T
Minh Châu 43'; Gilberto 54'	Report	Kayode 60'; Ngọc Duy 66'; Marronkle 86'

Lạch Tray Stadium, Hải Phòng
Attendance: 16,000
Referee: Nguyễn Trọng Thư

19 May 2013
17:00

Thanh Hóa	2–2	SHB Đà Nẵng
Dieng 20'; Quốc Phương 89'	Report	Merlo 70', 79'

Thanh Hóa Stadium
Attendance: 10,000
Referee: Bùi Thành Thanh Nghĩa

19 May 2013
16:30

Đồng Tâm Long An	2–2	Xi Măng Xuân Thành Sài Gòn
Thanh Bình 73'; Tấn Tài 84'	Report	Amougou 38'; Đức Linh 42'

Long An Stadium, Tân An
Attendance: 6,000
Referee: Ngô Quốc Hưng

==== Match-day 11 ====
25 May 2013
16:00

Đồng Nai	1–2	Kienlongbank Kiên Giang
Văn Thành 30'	Report	Abdullahi 7', 59'

Đồng Nai Stadium, Biên Hòa
Attendance: 12,000
Referee: Hoàng Phạm Công Khánh

25 May 2013
17:00

Vissai Ninh Bình	3–2	Vicem Hải Phòng
Văn Ta 6'; Anjembe 79'; Tiến Thành 83'	Report	Carlos 25'; Gilberto 90+3'

Ninh Bình Stadium
Attendance: 8,000
Referee: Nguyễn Đức Vũ

26 May 2013
17:00

Becamex Bình Dương	3–4	Thanh Hóa
Anh Đức 11', 16', 68'	Report	Čeh 4', 45' (pen.); Quốc Phương 56'; Văn Thắng 85'; Xuân Thành (red card) 64'

Gò Đậu Stadium, Thủ Dầu Một
Attendance: 25,000
Referee: Trần Trung Hiếu

26 May 2013
18:00

Xi Măng Xuân Thành Sài Gòn	1–0	Hoàng Anh Gia Lai
Kizito 55'	Report

Thống Nhất Stadium, Hồ Chí Minh
Attendance: 8,000
Referee: Phùng Đình Dũng

27 May 2013
16:30

SHB Đà Nẵng	3–2	Sông Lam Nghệ An
Quốc Anh 36'; Đình Hoàng 45+2' (o.g.); Merlo 54'	Report	Công Vinh 16', 29'

Chi Lăng Stadium, Đà Nẵng
Attendance: 20,000
Referee: Võ Minh Trí

27 May 2013
17:00

Hà Nội T&T	4–1	Đồng Tâm Long An
Kayode 48'; Marronkle 59', 75'; Văn Quyết 87'	Report	Kanu 68'

Hàng Đẫy Stadium, Hà Nội
Attendance: 1,000
Referee: Võ Quang Vinh

==== Match-day 12 ====
15 June 2013
16:30

SHB Đà Nẵng	1–1	Becamex Bình Dương
Minh Tuấn 38'	Report	Tăng Tuấn 17'

Chi Lăng Stadium, Đà Nẵng
Attendance: 18,000
Referee: Trần Trung Hiếu

15 June 2013
18:00

Xi Măng Xuân Thành Sài Gòn	4–1	Vicem Hải Phòng
Amougou 40' (pen.), 90+3'; Max 67', 79'; Việt Cường (yellow card) 43' (yellow-red card) 72'	Report	Văn Tân 55'; Tiến Thành (yellow card) 39' (yellow-red card) 90+3'

Thống Nhất Stadium, Hồ Chí Minh
Attendance: 6,000
Referee: Đinh Văn Dũng

15 June 2013
18:00

Sông Lam Nghệ An	2–2	Kienlongbank Kiên Giang
Bryan 25', 72'	Report	Ajala 20'; Hendricks 90+3'; Kiên Trung (yellow card) 62' (yellow-red card) 76'

Vinh Stadium
Attendance: 9,000
Referee: Hoàng Phạm Công Khánh

16 June 2013
16:00

Đồng Nai	2–1	Thanh Hóa
Đình Hiệp 38'; Nyirenda 90' (pen.)	Report	Dieng 73'; Anh Tuấn (yellow card) 61' (yellow-red card) 89'

Đồng Nai Stadium, Biên Hòa
Attendance: 12,000
Referee: Hoàng Anh Tuấn

16 June 2013
17:00

Hà Nội T&T	1–0	Vissai Ninh Bình
Marronkle 67'; Hồng Tiến (yellow card) 53' (yellow-red card) 89'	Report

Hàng Đẫy Stadium, Hà Nội
Attendance: 5,000
Referee: Võ Minh Trí

16 June 2013
17:00

Đồng Tâm Long An	1–0	Hoàng Anh Gia Lai
Kanu 41'	Report	Minh Thiện (red card) 59'

Long An Stadium, Tân An
Attendance: 5,000
Referee: Nguyễn Trọng Thư

==== Match-day 13 ====
22 June 2013
16:00

Hoàng Anh Gia Lai	1–1	Hà Nội T&T
Evaldo 58'; Trần Vũ (red card) 90'	Report	Roland 50'

Pleiku Stadium
Attendance: 6,000
Referee: Bùi Thành Thanh Nghĩa

22 June 2013
16:00

Kienlongbank Kiên Giang	0–1	SHB Đà Nẵng
Ngọc Hùng (yellow card) 19' (yellow-red card) 26'	Report	Merlo 58'

Rạch Giá Stadium
Attendance: 4,000
Referee: Võ Minh Trí

22 June 2013
17:00

Becamex Bình Dương	3–0	Xi Măng Xuân Thành Sài Gòn
Anh Đức 14'; Philani 23'; Sunday 45'	Report	Đình Luật (yellow card) 70' (yellow-red card) 70'

Gò Đậu Stadium, Thủ Dầu Một
Attendance: 5,000
Referee: Ngô Quốc Hưng

23 June 2013
17:00

Thanh Hóa	3–1	Đồng Tâm Long An
Čeh 29'; Hoàng Dương 56'; Dieng 63'	Report	P. Tấn Tài 80'; H. Tấn Tài (yellow card) 61' (yellow-red card) 61'

Thanh Hóa Stadium
Attendance: 6,000
Referee: Phùng Đình Dũng

23 June 2013
17:00

Vicem Hải Phòng	1–1	Sông Lam Nghệ An
Justice 73'	Report	Bryan 6'

Lạch Tray Stadium, Hải Phòng
Attendance: 12,000
Referee: Hoàng Anh Tuấn

23 June 2013
17:00

Vissai Ninh Bình	1–1	Đồng Nai
Danh Ngọc 47'	Report	Đình Hiệp 17'

Ninh Bình Stadium
Attendance: 4,000
Referee: Nguyễn Văn Kiên

==== Match-day 14 ====
29 June 2013
17:00

Vicem Hải Phòng	1–1	Thanh Hóa
Văn Tân 90+5'	Report	Dieng 83'

Lạch Tray Stadium, Hải Phòng
Attendance: 15,000
Referee: Hoàng Phạm Công Khánh

30 June 2013
16:00

Đồng Nai	0–0	Xi Măng Xuân Thành Sài Gòn
	Report

Đồng Nai Stadium, Biên Hòa
Attendance: 10,000
Referee: Trần Trung Hiếu

30 June 2013
16:00

Kienlongbank Kiên Giang	0–3	Hoàng Anh Gia Lai
	Report	Oseni 15'; Hoàng Thiên 26'; Evaldo 28'

Rạch Giá Stadium
Attendance: 5,000
Referee: Bùi Thành Thanh Nghĩa

30 June 2013
17:00

Becamex Bình Dương	0–0	Vissai Ninh Bình
	Report	Ngọc Anh (yellow card) 54' (yellow-red card) 89'

Gò Đậu Stadium, Thủ Dầu Một
Attendance: 10,000
Referee: Nguyễn Văn Kiên

30 June 2013
17:00

Hà Nội T&T	1–2	SHB Đà Nẵng
Văn Quyết 90+1'	Report	Merlo 73'; Janjuš 88'

Hàng Đẫy Stadium, Hà Nội
Attendance: 5,000
Referee: Ngô Quốc Hưng

30 June 2013
18:00

Sông Lam Nghệ An	8–0	Đồng Tâm Long An
Quang Tình 17'; Công Vinh 25', 60', 77', 90'; Bryan 64'; Trọng Hoàng 68', 75'	Report

Vinh Stadium
Attendance: 8,000
Referee: Nguyễn Quốc Hùng

==== Match-day 15 ====
6 July 2013
16:00

Hoàng Anh Gia Lai	1–0	Vicem Hải Phòng
Hữu Long 54'	Report

Pleiku Stadium
Attendance: 9,000
Referee: Bùi Thành Thanh Nghĩa

6 July 2013
16:30

SHB Đà Nẵng	0–0	Đồng Nai
	Report

Chi Lăng Stadium, Đà Nẵng
Attendance: 15,000
Referee: Nguyễn Văn Kiên

6 July 2013
17:00

Thanh Hóa	4–2	Kienlongbank Kiên Giang
Đức Tuấn 29'; Hồng Quân 46'; Hoàng Dương 55'; Dieng 76'	Report	Hendricks 48'; Tuấn Hiệp 90+4'

Thanh Hóa Stadium
Attendance: 8,000
Referee: Đinh Văn Dũng

7 July 2013
17:00

Hà Nội T&T	2–0	Xi Măng Xuân Thành Sài Gòn
Kayode 41', 50'	Report

Hàng Đẫy Stadium, Hà Nội
Attendance: 5,000
Referee: Nguyễn Trọng Thư

7 July 2013
17:00

Vissai Ninh Bình	1–1	Sông Lam Nghệ An
Văn Ta 36' (pen.)	Report	Công Vinh 23'

Ninh Bình Stadium
Attendance: 7,000
Referee: Hoàng Anh Tuấn

7 July 2013
17:00

Đồng Tâm Long An	2–5	Becamex Bình Dương
Đình Hưng 70'; Kanu 81'	Report	Vũ Phong 29'; Quang Vinh 45'; Philani 63'; Ekpe 90+3', 90+6'

Long An Stadium, Tân An
Attendance: 5,000
Referee: Võ Minh Trí

==== Match-day 16 ====
20 July 2013
16:00

Kienlongbank Kiên Giang	1–1	Hà Nội T&T
Ajala 70'	Report	Văn Quyết 45'; Quốc Long (yellow card) 30' (yellow-red card) 51'

Rạch Giá Stadium
Attendance: 3,000
Referee: Bùi Thành Thanh Nghĩa

20 July 2013
16:00

Hoàng Anh Gia Lai	2–2	SHB Đà Nẵng
Oseni 15'; Evaldo 90+2'	Report	Minh Phương 72'; Merlo 80'

Pleiku Stadium
Attendance: 8,000
Referee: Phùng Đình Dũng

20 July 2013
17:00

Becamex Bình Dương	1–1	Đồng Nai
Philani 12'; Philani (red card) 52'	Report	Helio 90' (o.g.)

Gò Đậu Stadium, Thủ Dầu Một
Attendance: 12,000
Referee: Hoàng Phạm Công Khánh

20 July 2013
17:00

Xi Măng Xuân Thành Sài Gòn	2 – 3	Vissai Ninh Bình
Thanh Sang 47'; Tài Em 76'	Report	Anh Tuấn 26'; Anjembe 71', 85'

Ninh Bình Stadium
Attendance: 5,000
Referee: Đinh Văn Dũng

21 July 2013
17:00

Vicem Hải Phòng	3–4	Đồng Tâm Long An
Quang Hải 36', 70'; Văn Phong 73' (pen.)	Report	Gilson Campos 27' (pen.); Tấn Tài 45', 86'; Việt Thắng 78'

Lạch Tray Stadium, Hải Phòng
Attendance: 9,000
Referee: Hoàng Anh Tuấn

21 July 2013
18:00

Sông Lam Nghệ An	2–0	Thanh Hóa
Văn Hoàn 65'; Công Vinh 85'	Report

Vinh Stadium
Attendance: 17,000
Referee: Nguyễn Trọng Thư

==== Match-day 17 ====
27 July 2013
17:00

Đồng Tâm Long An	3–2	Kienlongbank Kiên Giang
Gilson Campos 4', 69' (pen.); Kanu 34'	Report	Ajala 56'; Suleiman 90+5'

Long An Stadium, Tân An
Attendance: 5,000
Referee: Hoàng Phạm Công Khánh

27 July 2013
18:00

Sông Lam Nghệ An	1–0	Hoàng Anh Gia Lai
Hector 32'	Report

Vinh Stadium
Attendance: 21,000
Referee: Hoàng Anh Tuấn

28 July 2013
16:30

SHB Đà Nẵng	2–0	Vissai Ninh Bình
Hoàng Quảng 55'; Merlo 85'	Report

Chi Lăng Stadium, Đà Nẵng
Attendance: 12,000
Referee: Trần Trung Hiếu

28 July 2013
17:00

Hà Nội T&T	4–1	Becamex Bình Dương
Văn Hiếu 2'; Kayode 24', 62'; Bảo Khánh 90+1'	Report	Tăng Tuấn 45'

Hàng Đẫy Stadium, Hà Nội
Attendance: 1,500
Referee: Võ Minh Trí

28 July 2013
17:00

Thanh Hóa	1–2	Xi Măng Xuân Thành Sài Gòn
Quốc Phương 90+6'	Report	Oloya 23'; Đức Linh 85'

Thanh Hóa Stadium, Thanh Hóa
Attendance: 7,000
Referee: Phùng Đình Dũng

28 July 2013
17:00

Vicem Hải Phòng	4–0	Đồng Nai
Quang Hải 17', 27'; Gilberto 34'; Tấn Tài 28'	Report

Lạch Tray Stadium, Hải Phòng
Attendance: 4,000
Referee: Nguyễn Văn Kiên

==== Match-day 18 ====
3 August 2013
16:00

Hoàng Anh Gia Lai	1–3	Thanh Hóa
Oseni 49'	Report	Hồng Quân 22'; Quốc Phương 73'; Thế Dương 90+4'

Pleiku Stadium
Attendance: 7,000
Referee: Nguyễn Trọng Thư

3 August 2013
16:00

Đồng Nai	0–4	Hà Nội T&T
	Report	Marronkle 31'; Văn Quyết 45+4'; Kayode 86'; Thành Lương 90+5'; Quốc Long (yellow card) 33' (yellow-red card) 57'

Biên Hòa Stadium
Attendance: 5,000
Referee: Phùng Quốc Quân

3 August 2013
17:00

Vissai Ninh Bình	3–4	Đồng Tâm Long An
Sanogo 29', 41'; Anjembe 30'	Report	Thanh Giang 18'; Issac 43'; Việt Thắng 62'; Gilson Campos 81'

Ninh Bình Stadium
Attendance: 5,000
Referee: Bùi Thành Thanh Nghĩa

3 August 2013
18:00

Xi Măng Xuân Thành Sài Gòn	3–3	SHB Đà Nẵng
Oloya 16'; Ngọc Anh 49', 84'	Report	Hùng Sơn 10'; Quốc Anh 31'; Minh Tâm 77'

Thống Nhất Stadium, Hồ Chí Minh City
Attendance: 5,000
Referee: Ngô Quốc Hưng

4 August 2013
16:00

Kienlongbank Kiên Giang	1–5	Vicem Hải Phòng
Minh Trung 41' (pen.)	Report	Văn Phong 9'; Văn Tân 14' (pen.); Quang Hải 43'; Tấn Tài 49'; Giba 86'

Rạch Giá Stadium
Attendance: 6,000
Referee: Trần Trung Hiếu

4 August 2013
17:00

Becamex Bình Dương	2–1	Sông Lam Nghệ An
Quang Vinh 45+2'; Alves 76'	Report	Bryan 41'

Gò Đậu Stadium, Thủ Dầu Một
Attendance: 30,000
Referee: Đinh Văn Dũng

==== Match-day 19 ====
10 August 2013
16:00

Kienlongbank Kiên Giang	3–1	Xi Măng Xuân Thành Sài Gòn
Công Thuận 43'; Suleiman 70', 80'	Report	Kizito 52'

Rạch Giá Stadium
Attendance: 5,000
Referee: Đinh Văn Dũng

10 August 2013
17:00

Vicem Hải Phòng	1–2	Becamex Bình Dương
Majabvi 58'	Report	Emmanuel 4'; Anh Đức 13'

Lạch Tray Stadium, Hải Phòng
Attendance: 9,000
Referee: Phùng Đình Dũng

11 August 2013
16:00

Hoàng Anh Gia Lai	1–0	Đồng Nai
Evaldo 84'	Report

Pleiku Stadium
Attendance: 9,000
Referee: Hoàng Anh Tuấn

11 August 2013
17:00

Đồng Tâm Long An	3–2	SHB Đà Nẵng
Việt Thắng 48', 76'; Gilson Campos 87'	Report	Quốc Anh 54'; Duy Lam 63'

Long An Stadium, Tân An
Attendance: 3,000
Referee: Hoàng Phạm Công Khánh

11 August 2013
17:00

Thanh Hóa	1–0	Vissai Ninh Bình
Hồng Quân 51'	Report

Thanh Hóa Stadium
Attendance: 12,000
Referee: Võ Minh Trí

11 August 2013
18:00

Sông Lam Nghệ An	0–0	Hà Nội T&T
	Report

Vinh Stadium
Attendance: 20,000
Referee: Ngô Quốc Hưng

==== Match-day 20 ====
18 August 2013
17:00

Vissai Ninh Bình	1–0	Kienlongbank Kiên Giang
Sanogo 40'	Report

Ninh Bình Stadium
Attendance: 5,000
Referee: Nguyễn Trọng Thư

18 August 2013
17:00

SHB Đà Nẵng	1–0	Vicem Hải Phòng
Janjuš 5'	Report

Chi Lăng Stadium, Đà Nẵng
Attendance: 12,000
Referee: Bùi Thành Thanh Nghĩa

18 August 2013
17:00

Becamex Bình Dương	0–0	Hoàng Anh Gia Lai
	Report

Gò Đậu Stadium, Thủ Dầu Một
Attendance: 12,000
Referee: Hoàng Anh Tuấn

18 August 2013
17:00

Hà Nội T&T	3–2	Thanh Hóa
Kayode 8' (pen.), 48'; Ngọc Duy 80' (pen.)	Report	Čeh 44' (pen.), 90+2' (pen.); Thế Dương (yellow card) 84' (yellow-red card) 86'

Hàng Đẫy Stadium, Hà Nội
Attendance: 12,000
Referee: Võ Minh Trí

18 August 2013
17:00

Đồng Nai	3–1	Đồng Tâm Long An
Đức Thắng 25', 74'; Kisekka 90+2'	Report	Gilson Campos 23'

Biên Hòa Stadium
Attendance: 10,000
Referee: Phùng Quốc Quân

18 August 2013
17:00

Xi Măng Xuân Thành Sài Gòn	1–3	Sông Lam Nghệ An
Max 76'	Report	Trọng Hoàng 8'; Quang Tình 23'; Hector 90'

Thống Nhất Stadium, Hồ Chí Minh City
Attendance: 15,000
Referee: Trần Trung Hiếu

==== Match-day 21 ====
25 August 2013
17:00

Kienlongbank Kiên Giang	1–1	Đồng Nai
Abdullahi 64'	Report	Ngọc Quốc 47'

Rạch Giá Stadium
Attendance: 4,000
Referee: Nguyễn Hiền Triết

25 August 2013
17:00

Sông Lam Nghệ An	2–1	SHB Đà Nẵng
Phước Vĩnh 26' (o.g.); Quang Tình 81'	Report	Minh Tuấn 35'; Cao Cường (yellow card) 42' (yellow-red card) 55'; Hải Lâm (yellow card) 57' (yellow-red card) 85'

Vinh Stadium
Attendance: 14,000
Referee: Võ Minh Trí

25 August 2013
17:00

Vicem Hải Phòng	4–0	Vissai Ninh Bình
Giba 12'; Thanh Tùng 32'; Quang Hải 40', 84'	Report

Lạch Tray Stadium, Hải Phòng
Attendance: 7,000
Referee: Hoàng Phạm Công Khánh

25 August 2013
17:00

Thanh Hóa	2–1	Becamex Bình Dương
Dieng 58'; Čeh 67'	Report	Vũ Phong 57'

Thanh Hóa Stadium
Attendance: 10,000
Referee: Bùi Thành Thanh Nghĩa

25 August 2013
17:00

Đồng Tâm Long An	1–2	Hà Nội T&T
Kanu 83'	Report	Ngọc Duy 5'; Kayode 42'

Long An Stadium
Attendance: 6,000
Referee: Nguyễn Văn Kiên

==== Match-day 22 ====
31 August 2013
16:00

Becamex Bình Dương	6–0	Kienlongbank Kiên Giang
Alves 38' (pen.), 55'; Anh Đức 50', 65', 67', 81' (pen.)	Report

Gò Đậu Stadium, Thủ Dầu Một
Attendance: 3,000
Referee: Đinh Văn Dũng

31 August 2013
16:00

SHB Đà Nẵng	2–1	Thanh Hóa
Merlo 5'; Janjuš 27'	Report	Čeh 41' (pen.)

Chi Lăng Stadium, Đà Nẵng
Attendance: 10,000
Referee: Ngô Quốc Hưng

31 August 2013
16:00

Hà Nội T&T	3–3	Vicem Hải Phòng
Marronkle 17', 73' (pen.); Ngọc Duy 21'	Report	Văn Tân 23'; Đình Tùng 53', 78'

Hàng Đẫy Stadium, Hà Nội
Attendance: 9,500
Referee: Trần Trung Hiếu

31 August 2013
16:00

Vissai Ninh Bình	0–1	Hoàng Anh Gia Lai
	Report	Evaldo 16'

Ninh Bình Stadium
Attendance: 1,500
Referee: Phùng Đình Dũng

31 August 2013
16:00

Đồng Nai	2–1	Sông Lam Nghệ An
Khánh Thành 6' van Bakel 90+4'	Report	Plaza 3'; Hoàng Thịnh (red card) 90+3'

Biên Hòa Stadium, Biên Hòa
Attendance: 15,000
Referee: Hoàng Phạm Công Khánh

== Season statistics ==
=== Top scorers ===
As of August 31, 2013.

Rank	Player	Club	Goals
1	(Argentina) Gonzalo Damian Marronkle	Hà Nội T&T	14
1	(Nigeria) Samson Kayode	Hà Nội T&T	14
3	(Senegal) Abass Cheikh Dieng	Thanh Hóa	13
3	(Vietnam) Lê Công Vinh	Sông Lam Nghệ An	13
5	(Argentina) Gastón Merlo	SHB Đà Nẵng	12
5	(Vietnam) Nguyễn Anh Đức	Becamex Bình Dương	12
7	(Nigeria) Ganiyu Oseni	Hoàng Anh Gia Lai	10
7	(Brazil) Evaldo Goncalves	Hoàng Anh Gia Lai	10
7	(Ivory Coast) Moussa Sanogo	XM Vissai Ninh Bình	10
7	(Brazil) Gilson Campos	Đồng Tâm Long An	10

=== Hat-tricks ===
Player	For	Against	Result	Date
(Senegal) Abass Cheikh Dieng	Thanh Hóa	Đồng Nai	4–1	10 March 2013
(Ivory Coast) Moussa Sanogo*	Vissai Ninh Bình	SHB Đà Nẵng	4–1	5 May 2013
(Vietnam) Nguyễn Anh Đức	Becamex Bình Dương	Thanh Hóa	3–4	26 May 2013
(Vietnam) Lê Công Vinh*	Sông Lam Nghệ An	Đồng Tâm Long An	8–0	30 June 2013

^{*}: Scored four goals

=== Scoring ===
- First goal of the season: Gonzalo for Hà Nội T&T against Hoàng Anh Gia Lai (2 March 2013)
- Fastest goal of the season: 1 minute, Abass Cheikh Dieng for Thanh Hóa against Kienlongbank Kiên Giang (27 April 2013)
- Largest winning margin: 8 goals
  - Sông Lam Nghệ An 8–0 Đồng Tâm Long An (30 June 2013)
- Highest scoring game: 8 goals
  - Sông Lam Nghệ An 8–0 Đồng Tâm Long An (30 June 2013)
- Most goals scored in a match by a single team: 8 goals
  - Sông Lam Nghệ An 8–0 Đồng Tâm Long An (30 June 2013)
- Most goals scored in a match by a losing team: 3 goals
  - Becamex Bình Dương 3–4 Thanh Hóa (26 May 2013)
  - Vicem Hải Phòng 3–4 Đồng Tâm Long An (21 July 2013)
  - Vissai Ninh Bình 3-4 Đồng Tâm Long An (3 August 2013)

=== Clean sheets ===
- Most clean sheets: 8
  - SHB Đà Nẵng
- Fewest clean sheets: 0
  - Kienlongbank Kiên Giang

=== Discipline ===
- Most yellow cards (club): 62
  - Sông Lam Nghệ An F.C.
- Most yellow cards (player): 10
  - Nguyễn Quốc Long (Hà Nội T&T)
- Most red cards (club): 6
  - Thanh Hóa F.C.
- Most red cards (player): 2
  - Cao Sỹ Cường (Hà Nội T&T)
  - Nguyễn Quốc Long (Hà Nội T&T)
  - Trần Thanh Tuấn (XM Vicem Hải Phòng)
  - Đoàn Việt Cường (XM Xuân Thành Sài Gòn)

== Attendance ==
Pos	Team	Total	High	Low	Average	Change
1	Sông Lam Nghệ An	162,000	23,000	8,000	14,727	n/a
2	SHB Đà Nẵng	155,000	20,000	10,000	14,091	n/a
3	Vicem Hải Phòng	137,000	22,000	4,000	12,454	n/a
4	Becamex Bình Dương	130,000	30,000	3,000	11,818	n/a
5	Đồng Nai	125,000	19,000	5,000	11,364	n/a
6	Thanh Hóa	109,000	12,000	6,000	9,909	n/a
7	Hoàng Anh Gia Lai	76,000	10,000	5,000	7,600	n/a
8	Xuân Thành Sài Gòn	64,000	15,000	3,000	6,400	n/a
9	Hà Nội T&T	67,500	20,000	1,000	6,136	n/a
10	Đồng Tâm Long An	65,000	10,000	3,000	5,909	n/a
11	Vissai Ninh Bình	58,000	8,000	1,500	5,273	n/a
12	Kienlongbank Kiên Giang	52,500	6,000	2,500	4,773	n/a
	League total	1,200,500	30,000	1,000	9,235	+22.6%

Updated to games played on 30 March 2013

== Awards ==
=== Annual awards ===
==== Top scorer ====
(Argentina) Gonzalo Damian Marronkle (Hà Nội T&T)
(Nigeria) Samson Kayode Olaleye (Hà Nội T&T)

==== Manager of the Season ====
(Vietnam) Phan Thanh Hùng (Hà Nội T&T)

==== Best player of the Season ====
(Argentina) Gonzalo Damian Marronkle (Hà Nội T&T)

==== Best Young player of the Season ====
(Vietnam) Trần Minh Vương (HAGL)

==== Best Referee ====
(Vietnam) Nguyễn Trọng Thư

=== Monthly awards ===
Month	Player of the Month	
Month	Player	Club
March	(Vietnam) Lê Công Vinh	Sông Lam Nghệ An
April	(Brazil) Antonio	Vicem Hải Phòng
May	(Argentina) Gonzalo Marronkle	Hà Nội T&T
June	(Vietnam) Lê Công Vinh	Sông Lam Nghệ An

==== Dream Team ====
Goalkeepers	Defenders	Midfielders	Forwards
(Nigeria) Bassey Akpan (Hoàng Anh Gia Lai)	(Vietnam) Trần Đình Hoàng (Sông Lam Nghệ An) (Vietnam) Quế Ngọc Hải (Sông Lam Nghệ An) (Vietnam) Nguyễn Văn Biển (Hà Nội T&T) (Vietnam) Lê Quang Hùng (Vissai Ninh Bình)	(Vietnam) Lê Công Vinh (Sông Lam Nghệ An) (Trinidad and Tobago) Hughtun Hector (Sông Lam Nghệ An) (Slovenia) Nastja Čeh (FLC Thanh Hóa) (Vietnam) Phan Tấn Tài (Long An F.C)	(Argentina) Gonzalo Damian Marronkle (Hà Nội T&T) (Nigeria) Samson Kayode Olaleye (Hà Nội T&T)
