= 2012 Vietnamese Cup =

Tournament details
- Country: Vietnam
- Dates: 18 December 2011 – 29 August 2012

Final positions
- Champions: Sài Gòn Xuân Thành
- Runners-up: Hà Nội T&T

The 2012 Vietnamese Cup was the 20th edition of the Vietnamese National Cup. It started on 18 December 2011 and finished on 29 August 2012.

The cup winner pre-qualified for the 2013 AFC Cup.

== First round ==
18 December 2011	Becamex Bình Dương	2–2 (3–5 p)	XSKT Lâm Đồng	Gò Đậu Stadium, Thủ Dầu Một
17:00	Vũ Phong 11'; Philani 77'	Report	Trọng Phú 14'; Soleiman 28'; Hồng Quân (yellow card) 10' (yellow-red card) 67'	Attendance: 1,000; Referee: Nguyễn Văn Đông
	Penalties
	TBD		TBD

18 December 2011	Hùng Vương An Giang	0–2	SQC Bình Định	Long Xuyên Stadium, Long Xuyên
17:00		Report	Đặng Amaobi 32', 41'	Attendance: 2,500; Referee: Võ Quang Vinh

18 December 2011	Đồng Nai	1–1 (2–4 p)	Khatoco Khánh Hòa	Biên Hòa Stadium, Biên Hòa
17:00	Nyirenda 57'	Report	Agostinho 10'	Attendance: 500; Referee: Nguyễn Đức Vũ
	Penalties
	TBD		TBD

18 December 2011	Kienlongbank Kiên Giang	4–0	BHTS Quảng Nam	Rạch Giá Stadium, Rạch Giá
17:00	Ngọc Linh 28'; Mišura 29'; Văn Cường 35'; Anh Thoại 76'	Report		Attendance: 4,000; Referee: Bùi Thành Thanh Nghĩa

18 December 2011	XM Fico Tây Ninh	0–0 (4–5 p)	XM The Vissai Ninh Bình	Tây Ninh Stadium, Tây Ninh
17:00		Report		Attendance: 4,000; Referee: Hoàng Phạm Công Khánh
	Penalties
	TBD		TBD

18 December 2011	XSKT Cần Thơ	1–1 (4–2 p)	Than Quảng Ninh	Cần Thơ Stadium, Cần Thơ
17:00	Hùng Vũ 77'	Report	Xuân Ngọc 72'; Xuân Quyền (red card) 38'	Attendance: 1,000; Referee: Nguyễn Trọng Thư
	Penalties
	TBD		TBD

18 December 2011	Thành phố Hồ Chí Minh	1–3	Vicem Hải Phòng	Thống Nhất Stadium, Hồ Chí Minh City
17:00	Kiên Trung 90+1'	Report	Minh Châu 63'; Santos 82'; Fagan 83'	Attendance: 2,000; Referee: Vũ Bảo Linh

18 December 2011	Đồng Tâm Long An	1–3	SHB Đà Nẵng	Long An Stadium, Tân An
17:00	Đức Quý 71'	Report	Prent 60'; Merlo 63', 84'

18 December 2011	Trẻ Hà Nội	0–3 w/o	TĐCS Đồng Tháp	Hàng Đẫy Stadium, Hà Nội
17:00		Report

== Second round ==
24 December 2011	Sài Gòn	3–2	Khatoco Khánh Hòa	Thống Nhất Stadium, Hồ Chí Minh City
16:10	Alves 7'; Rodrigues 82'; Ngọc Huy 90'	Report	Hữu Phát 4'; Ngọc Điểu 17'	Attendance: 5,000; Referee: Kiều Việt Hùng

25 December 2011	Sông Lam Nghệ An	2–1	TĐCS Đồng Tháp	Vinh Stadium, Vinh
17:00	Quang Tình 58'; Bryan 66'	Report	Ajala 75'	Attendance: 2,000; Referee: Võ Minh Trí

25 December 2011	XM The Vissai Ninh Bình	2–1	Hà Nội	Ninh Bình Stadium, Ninh Bình
16:00	Rodrigues 27'; Dourado 68'	Report	Anjembe 34'	Attendance: 5,000; Referee: Đào Văn Cường

25 December 2011	XSKT Cần Thơ	1–3	Thanh Hóa	Cần Thơ Stadium, Cần Thơ
16:30	Souleymame 10'; Phương Tâm (yellow card) 51' (yellow-red card) 69'	Report	Sunday 28' da Silva 90+3'	Attendance: 1,000; Referee: Bùi Thành Thanh Nghĩa

25 December 2011	Navibank Sài Gòn	3–4	SQC Bình Định	Thống Nhất Stadium, Hồ Chí Minh City
17:00	Bùi Hoàng Mỹ 10' (o.g.); Ekpe 12', 45'	Report	Chibambo 23', 25', 90+3'; Công Mạnh 55'	Attendance: 4,000; Referee: Đinh Văn Dũng

25 December 2011	Hà Nội T&T	2–0	Vicem Hải Phòng	Hàng Đẫy Stadium, Hà Nội
16:10	Văn Quyết 63'; Marronkle 80'	Report		Attendance: 2,000; Referee: Nguyễn Trọng Thư

25 December 2011	XSKT Lâm Đồng	1–1 (1–3 p)	SHB Đà Nẵng	Lâm Đồng Sports Centre, Đà Lạt
14:45	Suleiman 46'	Report	Merlo 44'	Attendance: 5,000; Referee: Vũ Bảo Linh
	Penalties
	TBD		TBD

25 December 2011	Kienlongbank Kiên Giang	2–1	Hoàng Anh Gia Lai	Rạch Giá Stadium, Rạch Giá
15:30	Hải Thịnh 7'; Hoài Nam 38'; Duy An (red card) 88'; Duy An (red card) 88'	Report	Anh Tuấn 32'; Marcelo (red card) 88'	Attendance: 5,000; Referee: Hoàng Phạm Công Khánh

== Quarter-finals ==
29 January 2012	Sông Lam Nghệ An	3–3 (5–4 p)	The Vissai Ninh Bình	Vinh Stadium, Vinh
16:00	Ngọc Anh 27'; Văn Hoàn 50', 81'; Hoàng Thịnh (red card) 30'	Report	Farias 10' (pen.), 56'; Văn Duyệt 28'; Sanogo (red card) 36'; Đức Huy (red card) 89'	Attendance: 2,000; Referee: Hoàng Anh Tuấn
	Penalties
	TBD		TBD

29 January 2012	Sài Gòn	3–1	Thanh Hóa	Thống Nhất Stadium, Hồ Chí Minh City
18:30	Rodrigues 55', 83'; Alves 89'	Report	Quang Trung 11'; Hora (red card) 85'; Emmanuel (red card) 90'	Attendance: 5,000; Referee: Võ Quang Vinh

29 January 2012	SQC Bình Định	1–3	Hà Nội T&T	Quy Nhơn Stadium, Quy Nhơn
16:10	Chibambo 89'	Report	Ngọc Duy 37', 45'; Marronkle 87'	Attendance: 1,500; Referee: Võ Minh Trí

29 January 2012	SHB Đà Nẵng	3–0	Kienlongbank Kiên Giang	Chi Lăng Stadium, Đà Nẵng
16:10	Quốc Anh 23'; Merlo 25', 90+1'	Report	Timár 82'	Attendance: 8,000; Referee: Nguyễn Văn Kiên

== Semi-finals ==
25 August 2012	Sông Lam Nghệ An	1–3	Sài Gòn Xuân Thành ^{1}	Vinh Stadium, Vinh
18:00	Dieng 80'	Report	Alves 48'; Carlos 65', 90+2'	Attendance: 2,000; Referee: Nguyễn Đức Vũ

25 August 2012	Hà Nội T&T	1–0	SHB Đà Nẵng	Hàng Đẫy Stadium, Hà Nội
17:00	Marronkle 35'	Report		Attendance: 6,000; Referee: Vũ Bảo Linh

^{1} In April, Sai gon were renamed Sài Gòn Xuân Thành

== Final ==
29 August 2012
17:00

Sài Gòn Xuân Thành	4–1	Hà Nội T&T
Alves 11'; Carlos 35'; Hải Anh 76'; Rogerio 90+1'	Report	Marronkle 52'

Thống Nhất Stadium, Hồ Chí Minh City
Attendance: 12,000
Referee: Võ Quang Vinh
