= List of football stadiums in Vietnam =

The following is a list of football stadiums in Vietnam, ordered by capacity. Currently football stadiums with a capacity of 10,000 or more are included.

== Current stadiums ==
#	Image	Stadium	Capacity	City/Province	Home team
1	My Dinh National Stadium	Mỹ Đình National Stadium	40,192	Hanoi	The Cong-Viettel, Vietnam national football team
2	Cần Thơ Stadium	Cần Thơ Stadium	30,000	Cần Thơ	
3	Lach Tray Stadium	Lạch Tray Stadium	30,000	Hải Phòng	Haiphong FC
4	Thien Truong Stadium	Thiên Trường Stadium	30,000	Ninh Binh	Thep Xanh Nam Dinh
5	Ninh Bình Stadium	Ninh Bình Stadium	25,000	Ninh Binh	Ninh Binh FC
6	7th Military Region Stadium	Quân khu 7 Stadium	25,000	Ho Chi Minh City	Gia Dinh
7		Cao Lãnh Stadium	23,000	Đồng Tháp	Dong Thap FC
8	Hanoi Stadium	Hàng Đẫy Stadium	22,500	Hanoi	Cong An Hanoi, Hanoi FC
9	Đồng Nai Stadium	Đồng Nai Stadium	22,000	Đồng Nai	
10		Thái Nguyên Stadium	22,000	Thái Nguyên	
11	Hòa Xuân Stadium	Chi Lăng Stadium	20,500	Đà Nẵng	SHB Da Nang
12	Buôn Ma Thuật Stadium	Buôn Ma Thuật Stadium	20,000	Đắk Lắk	Dak Lak FC
13	Cam Pha Stadium	Cẩm Phả Stadium	20,000	Quảng Ninh	Quang Ninh FC
14	Đà Lạt Stadium	Đà Lạt Stadium	20,000	Lâm Đồng	Lam Dong FC
15		Hà Nam Stadium	20,000	Ninh Bình	Phong Phu Ha Nam
16	Ha Tinh Stadium	Hà Tĩnh Stadium	20,000	Hà Tĩnh	Hong Linh Ha Tinh
17		Phan Thiết Stadium	20,000	Lâm Đồng	
18	Quy Nhơn Stadium	Quy Nhơn Stadium	20,000	Gia Lai	Quy Nhon United
19	Việt Trì Stadium	Việt Trì Stadium	20,000	Phú Thọ	Phu Tho FC
20	Long An Stadium	Long An Stadium	19,975	Tây Ninh	Long An FC
21	Nha Trang Stadium	Nha Trang Stadium	18,000	Khanh Hoa	Khatoco Khanh Hoa
22	Vinh Stadium	Vinh Stadium	18,000	Nghệ An	Song Lam Nghe An
23	Tự Do Stadium	Tự Do Stadium	16,000	Huế	Hue FC
24		Ninh Thuận Stadium	15,000	Khánh Hòa	
25	Tam Kỳ Stadium	Tam Kỳ Stadium	15,000	Đà Nẵng	
26	Thống Nhất Stadium	Thống Nhất Stadium	15,000	Ho Chi Minh City	Cong An Ho Chi Minh City, Ho Chi Minh City WFC, Ho Chi Minh City Youth, Van Hien University
27	Thanh Hóa Stadium	Thanh Hóa Stadium	14,000	Thanh Hóa	Dong A Thanh Hoa
28	Gò Đậu Stadium	Gò Đậu Stadium	13,035	Ho Chi Minh City	Becamex Ho Chi Minh City
29	Pleiku Stadium	Pleiku Stadium	12,000	Gia Lai	Hoang Anh Gia Lai
30	Tiền Giang Stadium	Tiền Giang Stadium	12,000	Tiền Giang	
31		Quân khu 5 Stadium	12,000	Đà Nẵng	SHB Da Nang B
32	Bình Phước Stadium	Bình Phước Stadium	11,000	Đồng Nai	Truong Tuoi Dong Nai
33		Kon Tum Stadium	11,000	Quảng Ngãi	Kon Tum FC
34	Bà Rịa Stadium	Bà Rịa Stadium	10,000	Ho Chi Minh City	Ho Chi Minh City FC
35		Rạch Giá Stadium	10,000	An Giang	
36		Vĩnh Long Stadium	10,000	Vĩnh Long	Vinh Long FC

== Planned stadiums ==
- Vinfast - Trống Đồng Stadium
- PVF Stadium

== Former ==
Stadium	Capacity	City	Home team	Opened	Demolished
Chi Lăng Stadium	30,000	Đà Nẵng	SHB Đà Nẵng	1954	2018

== See also ==
- Football in Vietnam
- Lists of stadiums
