= Hoàng Vũ Samson =

Nigerian footballer

Samson Olaleye Hoàng Vũ Samson
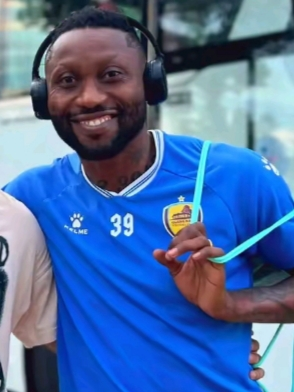
- Samson in 2025

Personal information
- Full name: Hoàng Vũ Olaleye Samson
- Birth name: Samson Kayode Olaleye
- Date of birth: 6 October 1988 (age 38)
- Place of birth: Kaduna, Nigeria
- Height: 1.82 m (6 ft 0 in)
- Position: Striker

Team information
- Current team: Becamex Hồ Chí Minh City
- Number: 39

Senior career*
Years	Team	Apps	(Gls)
2008	Than Quảng Ninh	22	(15)
2009–2011	Đồng Tháp	49	(43)
2011	Atlético Madrid B	0	(0)
2011	→ Braga (loan)	0	(0)
2011–2017	Hà Nội	128	(93)
2018	Buriram United	2	(0)
2018–2019	Hà Nội	25	(21)
2019	→ Quảng Nam (loan)	12	(7)
2020–2021	Đông Á Thanh Hóa	22	(9)
2022–2023	Hồ Chí Minh City	38	(14)
2023–2025	Quảng Nam	41	(17)
2025–2026	PVF-CAND	23	(4)
2026–	Becamex Hồ Chí Minh City	7	(2)
- * Club domestic league appearances and goals as of 21 November 2026

Samson Kayode Olaleye (born 6 October 1988), also known as Hoàng Vũ Samson, is a Nigerian professional footballer who plays as a striker for V.League 2 club Becamex Hồ Chí Minh City.

Widely regarded as one of the greatest players in V.League 1 history, he holds the V.League 1's record of being the all-time goal scorer with 202 goals becoming the first player to reach the 200 goals milestones.

== Club career ==
=== Than Quảng Ninh ===
Samson started his playing in Vietnam for Than Quảng Ninh. He scored 15 goals in his two years at the club.

=== Đồng Tháp ===
In 2009, Samson joined Đồng Tháp and later became one of the most popular foreign players in Vietnam. He scored 17 goals in 18 games in the 2011 season.

=== Atletico Madrid B ===
In August 2011, after being liquidated by Đồng Tháp ahead of time due to a hand injury, Kayode moved to Atlético Madrid B on a free transfer. He was then loaned to Braga because Atlético Madrid B had run out of quotas to sign non-EU players.

However, as soon as they learned that Atlético Madrid B signed a contract with Samson, the representative of Hà Nội had a file submitted to the VFF requesting not to issue an International Transfer Certificate (ITC) for the Nigerian striker because he had previously submitted a certificate to him. Then, Samson finally agreed to sign a memorandum of understanding to play for the capital team from the 2012 season with a part of the transfer money and a compensation clause in case of any violation.

=== Hà Nội ===
With Hà Nội, Samson was the V.League 1 top scorer in the 2013 and 2014 season. In October 2013, Samson was also naturalized to become a Vietnamese citizen, thus making him a domestic player in the league.

=== Buriram United ===
From the 2018 season, teams in the top two divisions of Thailand allow teams to register a foreign player of Southeast Asian (ASEAN) origin in the squad. Buriram United quickly reached an agreement with Hoàng Vũ Samson on 29 December 2017. However, he and his club ended their contract shortly after.

=== Return to Hà Nội ===
Returning to Hà Nội on 11 March 2018, Hoàng Vũ Samson is still trusted by coach Chu Đình Nghiêm. At this team, the 30-year-old has scored 21 goals in the 2018-19 season.

==== Quảng Nam (loan) ====
In 2019, Hoàng Vũ Samson was loaned out to Quảng Nam, scoring 7 goals in 12 matches.

=== Đông Á Thanh Hóa ===
From the 2020 season, the Nigerian-born player moved to Đông Á Thanh Hóa where he scored 9 goals in 22 matches.

=== Hồ Chí Minh City ===
On 19 October 2021, Samson joined his sixth Vietnamese club Hồ Chí Minh City.

=== Quảng Nam ===
On 27 September 2023, Samson joined Quảng Nam.

=== PVF-CAND ===
Following Quảng Nam's withdrawal from the 2025–26 V.League 1, Samson joined newly promoted V.League 1 side PVF-CAND.

=== Becamex Hồ Chí Minh City ===
In July 2026, Samson moved to V.League 2 club Becamex Hồ Chí Minh City.

== Career statistics ==
As of 21 November 2026

Appearances and goals by club, season and competition
Club	Season	League			National cup		Continental		Other		Total	
Club	Season	Division	Apps	Goals	Apps	Goals	Apps	Goals	Apps	Goals	Apps	Goals
Than Quang Ninh	2008	Vietnamese First Division	22	15	0	0	—		—		22	15
TĐCS Đồng Tháp	2009	V-League	16	13	1	0	—		—		17	13
TĐCS Đồng Tháp	2010	V-League	15	13	1	0	—		—		16	13
TĐCS Đồng Tháp	2011	V-League	18	17	1	0	—		—		19	17
TĐCS Đồng Tháp	Total		49	43	3	0	0	0	0	0	52	43
Hà Nội T&T	2012	Vietnamese Super League	24	14	4	0	—		—		28	14
Hà Nội T&T	2013	V.League 1	21	14	2	1	—		—		23	15
Hà Nội T&T	2014	V.League 1	19	24	1	0	9 (Note: Two appearances in AFC Champions League, Seven appearances and two goals in AFC Cup)	2	1 (Note: Appearances in Vietnamese Super Cup)	1	30	27
Hà Nội T&T	2015	V.League 1	19	15	4	4	2 (Note: Appearances in AFC Champions League)	2	—		25	21
Hà Nội T&T	2016	V.League 1	23	15	7	4	2	0	1	0	33	19
Hà Nội T&T	2017	V.League 1	22	11	1	1	2 (Note: Appearances in AFC Cup)	0	0	0	25	12
Hà Nội T&T	Total		128	93	19	10	15	4	2	1	166	108
Buriram United	2018	Thai League 1	2	0	—		—		1 (Note: Appearance in Thailand Champions Cup)	0	3	0
Hà Nội	2018	V.League 1	13	15	5	3	—		—		18	18
Hà Nội	2019	V.League 1	12	6	1	0	7	1	1	2	21	9
Hà Nội	Total		25	21	6	3	7	1	1	0	40	29
Quảng Nam (loan)	2019	V.League 1	12	7	2	0	—		—		14	7
Thanh Hóa	2020	V.League 1	17	6	2	1	—		—		19	7
Thanh Hóa	2021	V.League 1	5	3	0	0	—		—		10	6
Thanh Hóa	Total		22	9	2	1	0	0	0	0	24	10
Hồ Chí Minh City	2022	V.League 1	21	5	0	0	—		—		21	5
Hồ Chí Minh City	2023	V.League 1	17	9	1	0	—		—		18	9
Hồ Chí Minh City	Total		38	14	1	1	0	0	0	0	39	15
Quảng Nam	2023–24	V.League 1	26	13	2	0	—		—		28	13
Quảng Nam	2024–25	V.League 1	23	5	1	0	—		—		24	5
Quảng Nam	Total		49	18	3	0	0	0	0	0	52	21
PVF-CAND	2025–26	V.League 1	23	4	2	0	—		1 (Note: Appearance in V.League 1 promotion/relegation play-offs)	1	26	5
Becamex Hồ Chí Minh City	2026–27	V.League 2	7	2	0	0	—		—		7	2
Total			318	220	38	14	22	3	5	4	383	240

== Honours ==
Hà Nội

- V.League 1: 2013, 2016, 2018; Runner-up 2012, 2014, 2015
- Vietnamese National Cup: Runner-up 2012, 2015, 2016, 2019
- Vietnamese Super Cup: 2019; Runner-up 2014, 2016, 2017

=== Individuals ===
- V.League 1 top scorer: 2013, 2014
