= 2010 V-League =

V-League
- Season: 2010
- Dates: 30 January – 22 August
- Champions: Hà Nội T&T F.C.
- Runner up: Xi Măng Hải Phòng FC.
- Relegated: Megastar Nam Định
- Matches: 182
- Goals: 513 (2.82 per match)
- Average goals/game: 2,81
- Top goalscorer: (Argentina) Gastón Merlo (19 goals)
- Highest scoring: B.Bình Dương 6–2 LS.Thanh Hóa
- Longest winning run: T&T Hà Nội
- Longest losing run: Nam Định F.C.
- Highest attendance: 29,000; Xi Măng Hải Phòng FC v SHB Đà Nẵng F.C.
- Lowest attendance: 300; Navibank Sài Gòn F.C. v Khánh Hòa F.C.
- Average attendance: 8,297

The 2010 V-League season was the 27th season of Vietnam's national football league and the 10th as a professional league.

The league and cup winners would enter the 2011 AFC Cup.

The bottom side at the end of the season get relegated. The side that finishes 2ND from bottom enters an end of season play-off match against the 2nd Division's 2nd placed side.

== Teams ==
Ho Chi Minh City and Thanh Hóa were relegated to the 2010 Vietnam First Division after finishing the 2009 season in the bottom two places.

The two relegated teams were replaced by 2009 Vietnam First Division champions XM The Vissai Ninh Bình and runners-up Hòa Phát Hà Nội.

Nam Định defeated Thành phố Cần Thơ in the end of season promotion/relegation match to secure their place in the V. League.

Thể Công and Quân Khu 4 were renamed to Viettel F.C. and Navibank Sài Gòn at the end of the 2009 campaign. Viettel then sold their V. League slot to Thanh Hóa, to allow them to stay in the V. League after being relegated the previous season.

=== Stadia and locations ===
Locations of the V. League 2010 teams

Team	Location	Stadium	Capacity
Becamex Bình Dương	Thủ Dầu Một	Gò Đậu Stadium	18,250
Đồng Tâm Long An	Tân An, Long An	Long An Stadium	19,975
Đồng Tháp	Cao Lãnh	Cao Lãnh Stadium	23,000
Hòa Phát Hà Nội	Hanoi	Hàng Đẫy Stadium	22,500
Hoàng Anh Gia Lai	Pleiku	Pleiku Stadium	15,000
Khatoco Khánh Hòa	Nha Trang	Nha Trang Stadium	25,000
Lam Sơn Thanh Hóa	Thanh Hóa	Thanh Hóa Stadium	14,000
Megastar Nam Định	Nam Định	Thiên Trường Stadium	30,000
Navibank Sài Gòn	Ho Chi Minh City	Thống Nhất Stadium	25,000
SHB Đà Nẵng	Da Nang	Chi Lăng Stadium	30,000
Sông Lam Nghệ A	Vinh	Vinh Stadium	22,000
T&T Hà Nội	Hanoi	Hàng Đẫy Stadium	22,500
Xi Măng Hải Phòng	Hai Phong	Lạch Tray Stadium	28,000
XM The Vissai Ninh Bình	Ninh Bình	Ninh Bình Stadium	22,000

=== Managerial changes ===
Team	Outgoing manager	Manner of departure	Incoming manager
T&T Hà Nội	(Vietnam) Nguyễn Hữu Thắng	Contract expired	(Vietnam) Phan Thanh Hung
XM The Vissai Ninh Bình	(Singapore) Robert Lim	Bad results	(Vietnam) Lê Thụy Hải
Đồng Tâm Long An	(Portugal) Jose Luis	Health reasons	(Vietnam) Trần Công Minh
Đồng Tâm Long An	(Vietnam) Trần Công Minh	Temporary coach	(Portugal) Ricardo Formosinho
Bình Dương	(Vietnam) Mai Đức Chung	Bad results	(Vietnam) Đặng Trần Chỉnh
Navibank Sài Gòn	(Vietnam) Vũ Quang Bảo	Bad results	(Vietnam) Mai Đức Chung

== League table ==
Pos	Team	Pld	W	D	L	GF	GA	GD	Pts	Qualification or relegation
1	Hà Nội T&T (C)	26	14	4	8	35	25	+10	46	2011 AFC Cup group stage
2	Hải Phòng	26	14	3	9	41	34	+7	45	
3	TĐCS Đồng Tháp	26	13	5	8	43	34	+9	44	
4	Khatoco Khánh Hòa	26	13	4	9	42	42	0	43	
5	Đồng Tâm Long An	26	13	4	9	43	31	+12	43	
6	SHB Đà Nẵng	26	12	4	10	41	44	−3	40	
7	Hoàng Anh Gia Lai	26	11	6	9	34	27	+7	39	
8	Sông Lam Nghệ An	26	9	10	7	36	26	+10	37	2011 AFC Cup group stage (Note: Qualified by winning the 2010 Vietnamese Cup.)
9	Becamex Bình Dương	26	11	4	11	48	40	+8	37	
10	Hòa Phát Hà Nội	26	10	6	10	41	44	−3	36	
11	Vissai Ninh Bình	26	8	10	8	33	34	−1	34	
12	Thanh Hóa	26	8	7	11	36	46	−10	31	
13	Navibank Sài Gòn	26	4	8	14	21	39	−18	20	Promotion/relegation playoffs
14	Nam Định	26	3	3	20	19	47	−28	12	Relegation to Vietnamese First Division

Updated to match(es) played on 22 August 2010. Source: Soccerway
Rules for classification: 1) points; 2) goal difference; 3) number of goals scored.
(C) Champions
Notes:

V-League
2010 winners

1st title

== Top scorers ==
Rank	Scorer	Club	Goals
1	(Argentina) Gastón Merlo	SHB Đà Nẵng	19
2	(Brazil) Evaldo Goncalves	Hoàng Anh Gia Lai	16
3	(Vietnam) Huỳnh Kesley Alves	Bình Dương	14
3	(Nigeria) Timothy Anjembe	Hòa Phát Hà Nội	14
5	(Nigeria) Samson Kayode	Đồng Tháp F.C.	13
5	(Vietnam) Nguyễn Quang Hải	Khánh Hòa	13
7	(Brazil) Leandro	Xi Măng Hải Phòng FC	12
7	(Tanzania) Danny Mrwanda	Đồng Tâm Long An F.C.	12
7	(Democratic Republic of the Congo) Tshamala Kabanga	Đồng Tâm Long An F.C.	12
10	(Brazil) Gustavo Dourado	XM The Vissai Ninh Bình	11
10	(Serbia) Rajko Vidovic	Sông Lam Nghệ An	11

== Awards ==
=== Monthly awards ===
Month	Club of the Month	Coach of the Month		Player of the Month		Best goal(s) of the Month	
Month	Club of the Month	Coach	Club	Player	Club	Player	Club
January; February	SHB Đà Nẵng	(Vietnam) Lê Huỳnh Đức	SHB Đà Nẵng	(Argentina) Gastón Merlo	SHB Đà Nẵng	(Brazil) Cauê Benicio	Hà Nội T&T
March	TĐCS Đồng Tháp	(Vietnam) Lê Huỳnh Đức	SHB Đà Nẵng	(Nigeria) Samson Kayode	TĐCS Đồng Tháp	(Vietnam) Cao Sỹ Cường	Hà Nội T&T
April	Hà Nội T&T	(Vietnam) Phan Thanh Hùng	Hà Nội T&T	(Brazil) Evaldo Goncalves	Hoàng Anh Gia Lai	(Cameroon) Gaspard Yelleduor	Nam Định
May	Becamex Bình Dương	(Vietnam) Phạm Công Lộc	TĐCS Đồng Tháp	(Nigeria) Samson Kayode	TĐCS Đồng Tháp	(Vietnam) Hà Minh Tuấn	SHB Đà Nẵng
June	TĐCS Đồng Tháp	(Vietnam) Phạm Công Lộc	TĐCS Đồng Tháp	(Argentina) Gonzalo Marronkle	Hà Nội T&T	(Ghana) Dzigba B. Mawusi	Hoàng Anh Gia Lai
July	Hà Nội T&T	(Vietnam) Phan Thanh Hùng	Hà Nội T&T	(Nigeria) Timothy Anjembe	Hòa Phát Hà Nội	(Brazil) Tiago de Paula	Hoàng Anh Gia Lai
August	Xi măng Hải Phòng	(Vietnam) Phan Thanh Hùng	Hà Nội T&T	(Argentina) Gonzalo Marronkle	Hà Nội T&T	(Tanzania) Danny Mrwanda	Đồng Tâm Long An

== Relegation play-off ==
5 September 2010
15:30

Than Quảng Ninh	0–2	Navibank Sài Gòn
	VFF Report (in Vietnamese)	Nguyễn Văn Khải 61'; Leandro 66'

Chi Lăng Stadium
Attendance: 7,000
Referee: Hoàng Anh Tuấn
