= Philani =

South African soccer player

Personal information
- Full name: Philani Bhekizizwe Lancelot Kubheka
- Date of birth: 18 May 1979 (age 47)
- Place of birth: Bergville,KwaZulu-Natal, South Africa
- Height: 1.85 m (6 ft 1 in)
- Position: Striker

Youth career
- Orlando Pirates

Senior career*
Years	Team	Apps	(Gls)
2003–2004	Orlando Pirates		
2006–2013	Becamex Bình Dương	114	(34)
2014–2015	Negeri Sembilan FA	1	(0)

International career
- South Africa U-20

Managerial career
- 2018–: Orlando Pirates (youth coach)
- * Club domestic league appearances and goals

Philani Bhekizizwe Lancelot Kubheka (born 18 May 1979), known as just Philani, is a South African soccer coach and former player who played as a striker. He is renowned for his trickery and explosive pace.

Upon returning from Asia, Kubheka was appointed Orlando Pirates youth team coach where his team played in the SAFA Regional League.

== Club statistics ==
As of 27 November 2013

Club performance			League		Cup		League Cup		Continental		Total	
Season	Club	League	Apps	Goals	Apps	Goals	Apps	Goals	Apps	Goals	Apps	Goals
Vietnam			League		Vietnamese Cup		Super Cup		Asia		Total	
2009	Becamex Binh Duong F.C.	V-League	26	10	0	0	0	0	0	0	26	10
2010	Becamex Binh Duong F.C.	V-League	27	8	0	0	0	0	-		27	8
2011	Becamex Binh Duong F.C.	V-League	23	9	0	0	0	0	-		23	9
2012	Becamex Binh Duong F.C.	V-League	21	3	0	0	-		0	0	21	3
2013	Becamex Binh Duong F.C.	V-League	17	4	0	0	-		-		17	4
Career total	Becamex Binh Duong F.C.	V-League	114	34	0	0	0	0	0	0	114	34
