= Phan Duy Lam =

Vietnamese footballer

Personal information
- Full name: Phan Duy Lam
- Date of birth: 26 December 1988 (age 37)
- Place of birth: Cẩm Lệ, Đà Nẵng, Vietnam
- Height: 1.70 m (5 ft 7 in)
- Position: Defender

Youth career
- 2002–2009: SHB Đà Nẵng

Senior career*
Years	Team	Apps	(Gls)
2010–2019	SHB Đà Nẵng	160	(1)
2020–2021	Phố Hiến	32	(0)
2022–2023	Khánh Hòa	5	(0)
- * Club domestic league appearances and goals as of 2 October 2018

Phan Duy Lam (born 26 November 1988) is a Vietnamese footballer who plays as a defender for V.League 2 club Khánh Hòa.
