= Nguyễn Đình Hiệp =

Vietnamese footballer

Personal information
- Full name: Nguyễn Đình Hiệp
- Date of birth: 20 May 1990 (age 36)
- Place of birth: Nghi Lộc, Nghệ An, Vietnam
- Height: 1.73 m (5 ft 8 in)
- Position: Forward

Youth career
- 2002–2007: Sông Lam Nghệ An

Senior career*
| Years | Team | Apps | (Gls) |
| 2008–2009 | Sông Lam Nghệ An | 16 | (5) |
| 2009–2011 | Khatoco Khánh Hòa | 38 | (12) |
| 2012–2013 | Fico Tây Ninh | 4 | (0) |
| 2013–2014 | Đồng Nai | 17 | (3) |
| 2014 | Becamex Bình Dương | 1 | (0) |
| 2014–2015 | Long An | 6 | (1) |
| 2015–2016 | Hải Phòng | 20 | (1) |
| 2017–2021 | Long An | 87 | (14) |
- * Club domestic league appearances and goals

Nguyễn Đình Hiệp (born 20 May 1990) is a Vietnamese footballer who plays as a forward for Long An.
