= Robert Đặng Văn =

Slovak footballer

Robert Đặng Văn Việt
Personal information
- Full name: Robert Đặng Văn Việt
- Date of birth: 27 August 1984 (age 42)
- Place of birth: Prievidza, Czechoslovakia
- Height: 1.80 m (5 ft 11 in)
- Position: Center back

Senior career*
Years	Team	Apps	(Gls)
2009–2010	Hải Phòng	15	(0)
2011	Xuân Thành Sài Gòn	18	(1)
2012	FLC Thanh Hóa	8	(1)
2013–2017	Becamex Bình Dương	80	(0)
2017–2018	Hồ Chí Minh City	35	(4)
- * Club domestic league appearances and goals as of 14 July 2018

Robert Đặng Văn (Vietnamese name: Đặng Văn Việt; born 27 August 1984) is a retired Slovak footballer who played as a center back.

== Biography ==
Robert was born to Vietnamese father and Slovak mother. After the divorce of his parents, he moved to Vietnam with his father. After moving, Robert had to learn the Vietnamese language as he was not proficient in it. He is one of the most successful Overseas Vietnamese players in V.League 1 history, having won several titles in his career.

== International career ==
On 30 September 2015, Robert was called up for the first time to the Vietnam national football team for two 2018 FIFA World Cup qualifying matches against Iraq and Thailand. He was called up due to Nguyễn Văn Biển withdrew with an injury, but Robert did not feature in either match.

== Honours ==
Becamex Bình Dương

- V.League 1: 2014, 2015
- Vietnamese National Cup: 2015
- Vietnamese Super Cup: 2014, 2015
- Mekong Club Championship: 2014

== See also ==
- List of Vietnam footballers born outside Vietnam
