= Nguyễn Ngọc Duy =

Vietnamese footballer

- 2019

Personal information
- Full name: Nguyễn Ngọc Duy
- Date of birth: July 4, 1986 (age 40)
- Place of birth: Hanoi, Vietnam
- Height: 1.70 m (5 ft 7 in)
- Position: Midfielder

Youth career
- 1999–2007: Thể Công

Senior career*
| Years | Team | Apps | (Gls) |
| 2007–2009 | Thể Công | 55 | (5) |
| 2009–2015 | Hà Nội | 117 | (18) |
| 2016–2020 | Sài Gòn | 93 | (11) |
| Total | | 263 | (34) |

International career^{‡}
| 2009–2013 | Vietnam | 12 | (0) |
- * Club domestic league appearances and goals as of 4 November 2020 ‡ National team caps and goals as of 19 November 2013

Nguyễn Ngọc Duy (born 4 July 1986) is a Vietnamese retired professional footballer who played as a midfielder.

== Career ==
He started training when he was 13 years old. Duy is one of two most players (with Trịnh Quang Vinh) in training with U-19 The Cong at Bulgaria (2006). He has been known since 2008 V-League, he was a component of Thể Công when his team had the flourish time on that season, topped the league table but they was touched in eighth-placed. He is said to "not have high fitness" but "has a good speed with ingenious left foot so he's very dangerous when playing at left-back".

On December 30, 2008, Ngoc Duy was called to Vietnam by coach Henrique Calisto to prepare for the matches in 2011 AFC Asian Cup qualification against Lebanon and China.

== Honours ==
Hà Nội

- V.League 1: 2010, 2013
