= Christian Nsi Amougou =

Cameroonian footballer

Nsi Amougou
Personal information
- Full name: Christian Jose Nsi Amougou
- Date of birth: 8 June 1989 (age 37)
- Place of birth: Douala, Cameroon
- Height: 1.90 m (6 ft 3 in)
- Position: Forward

Senior career*
Years	Team	Apps	(Gls)
2008–2009	Đồng Tháp	10	(1)
2010	Than Quảng Ninh	13	(3)
2011–2013	Xuân Thành Sài Gòn	39	(19)
2014	Becamex Bình Dương	7	(0)
2015	Đồng Nai	26	(14)
2016	Becamex Bình Dương	22	(5)
2017–2018	XSKT Cần Thơ	24	(16)
- * Club domestic league appearances and goals as of 6 March 2019

Christian Jose Nsi Amougou (born 8 June 1989) is a Cameroonian former professional footballer.

== Career ==
=== Dong Nai ===
As persistent injury problems compelled to miss the whole 2014 V.League 1, he was sold from Binh Duong to Dong Nai F.C.

=== Binh Duong ===
Signing a one-year contract with Becamex Binh Duong in 2016, he was known for distinctive goal celebration imitating a cameraman's antics.

== Personal life ==
Living in Vietnam for over six years, he could be granted citizenship but chose not to.
