= Cleiton Kanu =

Brazilian footballer (born 1985)

Personal information
- Full name: Cleiton Januário Franco
- Date of birth: 17 May 1985 (age 41)
- Place of birth: São Paulo, Brazil
- Height: 1.94 m (6 ft 4 1/2 in)
- Position: Forward

Team information
- Current team: MAS Fez

Senior career*
Years	Team	Apps	(Gls)
- Engenheiro Beltrão
- Real Brasil
2008	Foz do Iguaçu		
2010	Volyn Lutsk	6	(1)
2011	Londrina		
2011–2012	Volta Redonda		
2012	Grêmio Maringá		
2013	Đồng Tâm Long An	12	(6)
2013	7 de Setembro		
2014	MAS Fez		
- * Club domestic league appearances and goals

Cleiton Januário Franco or simply Cleiton Kanu (born 17 May 1985) is a Brazilian forward. He currently is free agent.

== Career ==
Cleiton made his professional debut for Engenheiro Beltrão in the Campeonato Paranaense. After, he played for Real Brasil C.F. from Curitiba.

On 12 January 2010 Kanu transferred to Volyn Lutsk.

== Honours ==
- Volyn Lutsk
  - 2 place in the Ukrainian First League: 2010
