= 2009 V-League =

V-League
- Season: 2009
- Dates: 7 February – 23 August
- Champions: Da Nang
- Runner up: Bình Dương
- Relegated: Thanh Hóa; Ho Chi Minh City
- 2010 AFC Champions League: Da Nang
- 2010 AFC Cup: Bình Dương

The 2009 V-League was the 26th season of Vietnam's national football league and the 9th as a professional league.. The league was held from February 7, 2009 to August 23, 2009.

The league winners qualify for the AFC Champions League qualifying round in 2010. The cup winners enter the AFC Cup.

The bottom two sides at the end of the season get relegated. The side that finishes 3rd from bottom enters an end of season play-off match against the 2nd Division's 3rd placed side.

== Managerial changes ==
Team	Outgoing manager	Manner of departure	Replaced by	Date of appointment	Position in table
Bình Dương F.C.	(Portugal) Francisco Vital	Bad start to domestic campaign	(Vietnam) Nguyen Minh Dung	April 2009	13th
Bình Dương F.C.	(Vietnam) Nguyên Minh Dung	Temporary Coach	(Vietnam) Mai Duc Chung	May 2009	8th

== Final league table ==
Pos	Team	Pld	W	D	L	GF	GA	GD	Pts	Qualification or relegation
1	SHB Đà Nẵng (C)	26	15	5	6	48	29	+19	50	Qualification for 2010 AFC Champions League qualifying play-off
2	Becamex Bình Dương	26	12	7	7	49	35	+14	43	Qualification for AFC Cup 2010 Group stage (Note: Since the Vietnamese Cup 2009 winner SHB Đà Nẵng F.C. has already qualified to AFC Champions League, the place in the AFC Cup qualification goes to the V-League runners-up.)
3	Sông Lam Nghệ An	26	11	10	5	39	28	+11	43	
4	Hà Nội T&T	26	11	6	9	44	35	+9	39	
5	TĐCS Đồng Tháp	26	10	8	8	43	31	+12	38	
6	Hoàng Anh Gia Lai	26	11	4	11	44	45	−1	37	
7	Xi Măng Hải Phòng	26	11	3	12	29	35	−6	36	
8	Khatoco Khánh Hòa	26	9	8	9	36	35	+1	35	
9	Thể Công	26	10	5	11	40	46	−6	35	
10	Đồng Tâm Long An	26	7	13	6	43	37	+6	34	
11	Quân Khu 4	26	10	3	13	35	44	−9	33	
12	GM Mikado Nam Định	26	8	7	11	31	36	−5	31	Promotion/relegation playoffs
13	Thành phố Hồ Chí Minh (R)	26	8	5	13	34	44	−10	29	Relegation to Vietnam First Division
14	Thanh Hóa (R)	26	5	4	17	32	69	−37	19	Relegation to Vietnam First Division

Updated to match(es) played on August 23, 2009. Source:
Rules for classification: 1) points; 2) goal difference; 3) number of goals scored.
(C) Champions; (R) Relegated
Notes:

V-League
2009 winners

1st title

== Dream Team ==
Goalkeepers	Defenders	Midfielders	Forwards
(Vietnam) Bùi Tấn Trường (Cao su Đồng Tháp)	(Vietnam) Nguyễn Minh Đức (Xi Măng Hải Phòng) (Vietnam) Trần Hải Lâm (SHB Đà Nẵng) (Vietnam) Huỳnh Quang Thanh (Becamex Bình Dương)	(Vietnam) Lê Công Vinh (T&T Hà Nội) (Brazil) Leandro (Xi Măng Hải Phòng) (Thailand) Datsakorn Thonglao (Hoàng Anh Gia Lai) (United States) Lee Nguyễn (Hoàng Anh Gia Lai) (Vietnam) Nguyễn Vũ Phong (Becamex Bình Dương)	(Argentina) Gastón Merlo (SHB Đà Nẵng) (Brazil) Lazaro (Quân khu 4)

== Play-off ==
30 August 2009
15:30

Thành phố Cần Thơ	0–1	Nam Định
	Report	Philip Okoro 69'

Chi Lăng Stadium
Attendance: 6000
Referee: Dương Văn Hiền
