= Jonathan Quartey (footballer, born 1984) =

Ghanaian football player

Personal information
- Full name: Jonathan Quartey / Lê Văn Tân
- Date of birth: 30 July 1984 (age 42)
- Place of birth: Accra, Ghana
- Height: 1.80 m (5 ft 11 in)
- Position: Striker

Youth career
- –2001: Liberty Professionals

Senior career*
Years	Team	Apps	(Gls)
2001–2004	Liberty Professionals		
2007–2010	Khánh Hòa		
2011	Hà Nội ACB	24	(4)
2012	Khánh Hòa	25	(5)
2013	Hải Phòng	22	(4)
2014–2015	FLC Thanh Hóa	46	(13)
2015–2017	Long An	11	(3)
2018	Gokulam Kerala	2	(0)
2018	Sài Gòn	3	(0)
2018–2019	Tây Ninh	1	(1)
2019	Air Force United	11	(0)

International career^{‡}
2003	Ghana	1	(0)
- * Club domestic league appearances and goals as of 10 October 2019 ‡ National team caps and goals as of 21 July 2018

Jonathan Quartey (born 30 July 1984), also known as Lê Văn Tân, is a Ghanaian former footballer who played as a striker.

He was granted Vietnamese citizenship in 2011, under the name Lê Văn Tân.

In February 2018, he moved to India and signed with Gokulam Kerala.
