= Gastón Merlo =

Argentine footballer

Sebastián Gastón Merlo Đỗ Merlo
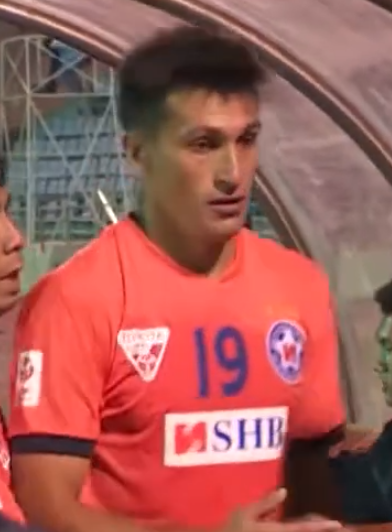
- Gastón Merlo in 2016

Personal information
- Full name: Sebastián Gastón Merlo
- Date of birth: 26 January 1985 (age 41)
- Place of birth: Jovita, Córdoba, Argentina
- Height: 1.92 m (6 ft 4 in)
- Position: Striker

Youth career
- Moto Kart Jovita

Senior career*
Years	Team	Apps	(Gls)
2000–2005	Moto Kart Jovita	50	(45)
2005–2009	Ferro Carril Oeste	60	(36)
2009–2014	SHB Đà Nẵng	105	(85)
2015	Ferro Carril Oeste	18	(10)
2016–2019	SHB Đà Nẵng	70	(48)
2020	Nam Định	23	(12)
2021–2023	Sài Gòn	25	(10)
2023	Costa Brava	?	(?)
2024	LPBank Ho Chi Minh City	?	(?)
- * Club domestic league appearances and goals

Sebastián Gastón Merlo (born 26 January 1985), also referred to as Đỗ Merlo, is an Argentine professional footballer who played as a striker.

== Career ==
Merlo was one of the best goalscorers in the V.League 1, the top tier of Vietnamese football. During his first passage with SHB Đà Nẵng, he won the league's top scorer award three times in a row from 2009 to 2011. He also won the league's best foreign player award in 2009 and 2011.

After taking a year to recover from a leg injury in his native Argentina, Merlo rejoined SHB Đà Nẵng in February 2016 and won the V.League 1 top scorer award for the fourth time in his career. In June 2017, he was granted Vietnamese citizenship and got a new name, Đỗ Merlo.

In 2023, Merlo returned to his birth country and signed for CA Costa Brava and later announced his retirement. However, in May 2024, he resumed his playing career, signing for LPBank Ho Chi Minh City in the Vietnamese Second Division.

== Career statistics ==
As of 14 September 2019

Appearances and goals by club, season and competition
Club	Season	League			Cup		International		Other		Total	
Club	Season	Division	Apps	Goals	Apps	Goals	Apps	Goals	Apps	Goals	Apps	Goals
Ferro Carril Oeste	2005–06	Primera B Nacional	4	0	–		–		–		4	0
Ferro Carril Oeste	2006–07	Primera B Nacional	6	4	–		–		–		6	4
Ferro Carril Oeste	2007–08	Primera B Nacional	17	10	–		–		–		17	10
Ferro Carril Oeste	2008–09	Primera B Nacional	33	22	–		–		–		33	22
Ferro Carril Oeste	Total		60	36	–		–		–		60	36
SHB Đà Nẵng	2009	V.League 1	18	15	–		–		–		18	15
SHB Đà Nẵng	2010	V.League 1	21	19	–		7	9	–		28	28
SHB Đà Nẵng	2011	V.League 1	24	22	–		–		–		24	22
SHB Đà Nẵng	2012	V.League 1	17	16	–		–		–		17	16
SHB Đà Nẵng	2013	V.League 1	21	11	–		6	6	–		27	17
SHB Đà Nẵng	2014	V.League 1	4	2	–		–		–		4	2
SHB Đà Nẵng	Total		105	85	–		13	15	–		118	100
Ferro Carril Oeste	2015	Torneo Federal A	18	10	–		–		–		18	10
SHB Đà Nẵng	2016	V.League 1	24	24	–		–		–		24	24
SHB Đà Nẵng	2017	V.League 1	11	6	–		–		–		11	6
SHB Đà Nẵng	2018	V.League 1	14	5	–		–		–		14	5
SHB Đà Nẵng	2019	V.League 1	22	11	–		–		–		22	11
SHB Đà Nẵng	Total		69	48	–		–		–		69	48
Career total			263	179	–		13	5	–		247	194

== Honours ==
SHB Đà Nẵng

- V.League 1: 2009, 2012; runner-up: 2013
- Vietnamese Super Cup: 2013
- Vietnamese National Cup: 2009

Individual

- V.League 1 Top scorer: 2009, 2010, 2011, 2016
