= Nguyễn Ngọc Anh (footballer) =

Vietnamese footballer

Personal information
- Full name: Nguyễn Ngọc Anh
- Date of birth: 10 August 1988 (age 38)
- Place of birth: Kỳ Sơn, Nghệ An, Vietnam
- Height: 1.78 m (5 ft 10 in)
- Position: Forward

Team information
- Current team: Đồng Nai
- Number: 10

Youth career
- 2008–2011: Sông Lam Nghệ An

Senior career*
Years	Team	Apps	(Gls)
2011–2012	Sông Lam Nghệ An	5	(0)
2013	Xuân Thành Sài Gòn	13	(0)
2014–2016	Đồng Nai	28	(6)
2017–2018	Cần Thơ	3	(0)
2018–2019	Hồ Chí Minh City	2	(0)
2019–	Đồng Nai	33	(12)

International career
2009–2011	Vietnam U23	6	(0)
- * Club domestic league appearances and goals

Nguyễn Ngọc Anh (born 10 August 1988) is a Vietnamese footballer who plays as a forward for V.League 3 club Đồng Nai
