= Khuất Hữu Long =

Vietnamese footballer (born 1987)

Personal information
- Full name: Khuất Hữu Long
- Date of birth: February 19, 1987 (age 39)
- Place of birth: Mang Yang, Gia Lai, Vietnam
- Height: 1.78 m (5 ft 10 in)
- Position: Defender

Senior career*
Years	Team	Apps	(Gls)
2012–2017	Hoàng Anh Gia Lai	125	(4)
- * Club domestic league appearances and goals as of 20 September 2015

Khuất Hữu Long (born 19 February 1987) is a Vietnamese retired footballer who plays as a defender. He was called up once for the Vietnam national football team but did not play.
