= Joseph Hendricks (footballer) =

Ghanaian footballer

Joe Hendricks
Personal information
- Full name: Joseph Hendricks
- Date of birth: February 5, 1975 (age 51)
- Place of birth: Kumasi, Ghana
- Height: 1.86 m (6 ft 1 in)
- Position: Defender

Team information
- Current team: Kessben F.C.
- Number: 4

Youth career
- 1997: Sekondi Wise Fighters
- 1998–1999: Asante Kotoko

Senior career*
Years	Team	Apps	(Gls)
1999–2005	Asante Kotoko	75	(7)
2006–2007	Ashanti Gold SC	17	(3)
2007–2009	Hapoel Ironi Rishon LeZion F.C.	27	(50)
2009	All Blacks FC	20	(0)
2010–2012	Kessben F.C.		
2012–	KiênlongBank Kiên Giang		

International career
2002–2003	Ghana	5	(0)
- * Club domestic league appearances and goals

Joe Hendricks (born June 19, 1979) is a Ghanaian football player who, currently plays for Kessben F.C.

== Career ==
Hendricks began his career with Sekondi Wise Fighters before transferring to Asante Kotoko where he was named the captain after a few seasons. and joined after seven years in Kumasi to Ashanti Gold SC. After one year in Obuasi signed with Hapoel Ironi Rishon LeZion F.C. and turned on 10 April 2009 back to sign with Ghana Premier League club All Blacks FC.
