= Gonzalo Marronkle =

Argentine footballer (born 1984)

Personal information
- Full name: Gonzalo Damian Marronkle
- Date of birth: 14 November 1984 (age 41)
- Place of birth: Córdoba, Argentina
- Height: 1.92 m (6 ft 4 in)
- Position: Forward

Youth career
- 1997–2002: Lanús

Senior career*
Years	Team	Apps	(Gls)
2002–2003	Lanús	4	(0)
2003–2004	Los Andes	0	(0)
2004–2004	Defensa	5	(0)
2004–2005	FC Porto B	15	(8)
2005–2006	Marco	12	(0)
2006–2007	Chaves	26	(0)
2007–2009	Portimonense	51	(9)
2010–2017	Hanoi FC	138	(81)
2018	Ho Chi Minh City	5	(0)
2019–2020	Gimnasia y Esgrima	9	(1)
- * Club domestic league appearances and goals

Gonzalo Damian Marronkle (born 14 November 1984) is an Argentine former professional footballer who played as a forward.

Born in Córdoba, Argentina, Marronkle started his career with Lanús before to moving on to other clubs such as Los Andes and Defensa. In 2004, he moved to Portugal to FC Porto but did not make an impact and played for lower Portuguese clubs like Marco and Chaves before moving to Portimonense where he was the main striker and goal threat.

== Honours ==
Hanoi FC

- V.League 1: 2010, 2013, 2016
- Vietnamese Super Cup: 2010

Individuals

- V.League 1 top goalscorer: 2013
