= Vũ Anh Tuấn =

Vietnamese footballer

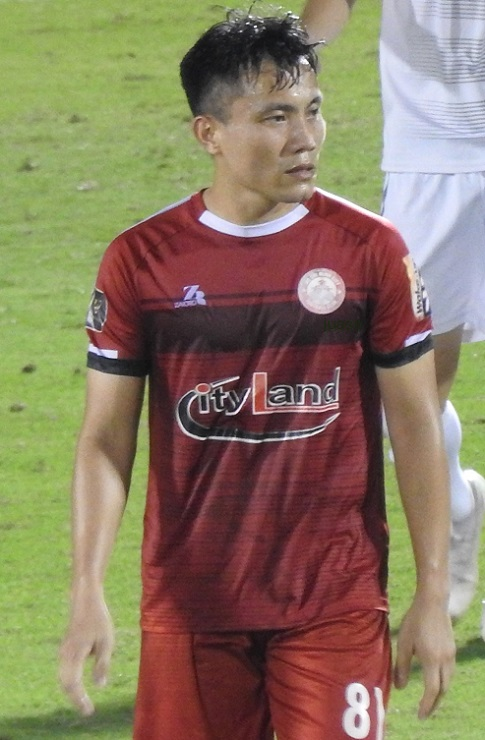

Personal information
- Full name: Vũ Anh Tuấn
- Date of birth: September 15, 1987 (age 39)
- Place of birth: Pleiku, Gia Lai, Vietnam
- Height: 1.70 m (5 ft 7 in)
- Position: Midfielder

Youth career
- 2000–2008: Đồng Tháp

Senior career*
Years	Team	Apps	(Gls)
2009–2011	Đồng Tháp	27	(1)
2011–2015	Hoàng Anh Gia Lai	31	(3)
2015	Quảng Nam	22	(1)
2016–2017	XSKT Cần Thơ	45	(1)
2018–2020	Hồ Chí Minh City	30	(1)

International career
2009–2017	Vietnam	1	(0)
- * Club domestic league appearances and goals as of 23 June 2018

Vũ Anh Tuấn (born September 15, 1987) is a Vietnamese footballer who is a midfielder.
