= Trần Đình Hoàng =

Vietnamese footballer

Personal information
- Full name: Trần Đình Hoàng
- Date of birth: December 8, 1991 (age 34)
- Place of birth: Vinh, Nghệ An, Vietnam
- Height: 1.76 m (5 ft 9 in)
- Position: Right-back

Youth career
- 2003–2012: Sông Lam Nghệ An

Senior career*
Years	Team	Apps	(Gls)
2013–2019	Sông Lam Nghệ An	130	(0)
2020–2021	SHB Đà Nẵng	25	(0)
2022–2025	Sông Lam Nghệ An	68	(1)
Total		223	(1)

International career^{‡}
2013–2014	Vietnam U23	2	(0)
2014–2016	Vietnam	7	(0)
- * Club domestic league appearances and goals as of 26 May 2025 ‡ National team caps and goals as of 29 March 2016

Trần Đình Hoàng (born 8 December 1991) is a former Vietnamese footballer who last played as a right-back for Sông Lam Nghệ An. Between 2014 and 2016, he appeared 7 times for the Vietnam national football team.

== Honours ==
Sông Lam Nghệ An

- Vietnamese National Cup: 2017
