= Nguyễn Vũ Hoàng Dương =

Vietnamese footballer

Personal information
- Full name: Nguyễn Vũ Hoàng Dương
- Date of birth: August 20, 1992 (age 34)
- Place of birth: Vĩnh Lộc, Thanh Hóa, Vietnam
- Height: 1.75 m (5 ft 9 in)
- Position: Midfielder

Team information
- Current team: Trường Tươi Đồng Nai
- Number: 36

Youth career
- 2004–2012: FLC Thanh Hóa

Senior career*
Years	Team	Apps	(Gls)
2013–2017	FLC Thanh Hóa	23	(3)
2017–2019	Hải Phòng	40	(2)
2020–2021	Thanh Hóa	11	(1)
2022–2024	Quảng Nam	46	(5)
2024–	Trường Tươi Đồng Nai	34	(0)
- * Club domestic league appearances and goals as of 30 May 2026

Nguyễn Vũ Hoàng Dương (born 20 August 1992) is a Vietnamese professional footballer who plays as a midfielder for V.League 2 club Trường Tươi Đồng Nai .

== Honours ==
Quảng Nam

- V.League 2: 2023

Trường Tươi Đồng Nai

- V.League 2: 2025–26
