= Nguyễn Quốc Long =

Vietnamese footballer

- 2019

Personal information
- Full name: Nguyễn Quốc Long
- Date of birth: 19 February 1988 (age 38)
- Place of birth: Hải Dương, Vietnam
- Height: 1.70 m (5 ft 7 in)
- Position: Right back

Senior career*
Years	Team	Apps	(Gls)
2008–2009	Thể Công	14	(0)
2010–2016	Hà Nội	103	(1)
2016–2020	Sài Gòn	100	(2)
2021	Hà Nội	3	(0)
2022	Sài Gòn	3	(0)
Total		223	(3)

International career
2011–2012	Vietnam U23	3	(0)
- * Club domestic league appearances and goals as of 1 April 2018

Nguyễn Quốc Long (born 19 February 1988) is a Vietnamese retired professional footballer who played as a right back.

Nguyễn Quốc Long began his career at Thể Công. He then spent most of his career with mixed successes at Hanoi FC and Saigon FC.
