= Moussa Sanogo =

Ivorian footballer

Personal information
- Full name: Moussa Sanogo
- Date of birth: 16 July 1983 (age 43)
- Place of birth: Abidjan, Ivory Coast
- Height: 1.80 m (5 ft 11 in)
- Positions: Attacking midfielder; striker

Youth career
- ASEC Abidjan

Senior career*
| Years | Team | Apps | (Gls) |
| 2002–2005 | KSK Beveren | 67 | (27) |
| 2005–2007 | FC Brussels | 30 | (13) |
| 2007 | Maccabi Netanya | 12 | (1) |
| 2008–2009 | FC Brussels | 27 | (13) |
| 2009–2011 | RAEC Mons | 48 | (16) |
| 2012–2013 | XM The Vissai Ninh Bình | 45 | (23) |
| 2015 | Hoàng Anh Gia Lai | 10 | (4) |
| 2017–2018 | K.V. Woluwe-Zaventem | | |
- * Club domestic league appearances and goals as of 9 August 2015

Moussa Sanogo (born 16 July 1983) is an Ivorian former professional footballer who played as an attacking midfielder or striker.

== Career ==
Like so many players of Ivorian origin, Sanogo began his career after coming through the famed youth academy at homeland club ASEC Abidjan, before moving to Belgian league club KSK Beveren. From here, he impressed enough to earn a transfer to rival Belgian club Brussels in 2005.

In January 2007, Sanogo moved to Maccabi Netanya in Israel, but was released after half a season.

In July 2008, after a year of not being active, Sanogo signed with FC Brussels for the second time in his career.

Sanogo joined Leeds United on trial, he was due to play in the friendly against Grimsby Town but did not receive international clearance.

In August 2009, he signed with RAEC Mons.

In December 2011, he moved to play for Vissai Ninh Bình in the V.League. In his first season with the club, he was Ninh Bình top scorer with 12 goals in 24 league games. The following season, he won the Vietnamese National Cup with Ninh Bình and again was the top scorer for the club with 10 goals in the league and 1 goal in the cup.

== Honours ==
KSK Beveren

- Belgian Cup runner-up: 2003–04

XM The Vissai Ninh Bình

- Vietnamese National Cup: 2013
