= Victor Nyirenda =

Malawian footballer

Personal information
- Full name: Victor Nyirenda
- Date of birth: 23 August 1988 (age 38)
- Place of birth: Blantyre, Malawi
- Height: 1.62 m (5 ft 4 in)
- Position: Striker

Youth career
- 2002–2004: ESCOM United

Senior career*
Years	Team	Apps	(Gls)
2005	ESCOM United	29	(13)
2006–2009	MTL Wanderers	46	(10)
2010–2013	APR FC	9	(2)
2013	Đồng Nai	17	(4)
2014	Đồng Tháp		(1)

International career
2008–2010	Malawi	17	(4)
- * Club domestic league appearances and goals

Victor Nyirenda (born 23 August 1988 in Blantyre) is a Malawian footballer.

== Career ==
Nyirenda began his career for ESCOM United and joined 2006 to League rival MTL Wanderers. After four years with MTL Wanderers signed in January 2010 for Rwandan club APR Kigali.

== International career ==
He played for the Malawi national football team at 2010 African Cup of Nations.
