= Xuan Thanh Saigon Cement FC =

Vietnamese football club

Xuân Thành Sài Gòn Cement
- Full name: Xuân Thành Sài Gòn Cement Football Club
- Founded: 2010
- Dissolved: 2013
- Ground: Thong Nhat Stadium, Ho Chi Minh City, Vietnam
- Capacity: 20,000
Home colours

Xuan Thanh Saigon Cement (Vietnamese: Câu lạc bộ bóng đá Xi măng Xuân Thành Sài Gòn) was a Vietnamese professional football club based in Ho Chi Minh City, active from 2010 to 2013.

Their home stadium was Thong Nhat Stadium.

== Honours ==
=== Domestic ===
League

- V.League 1
  - Third place: 2012
- V.League 2
  - Winners: 2011

Cup

- Vietnamese National Cup
  - Winners: 2012

== Season-by-season record ==
Season	Pld	Won	Draw	Lost	GF	GA	GD	PTS	Final position	Notes
2011 First Division	26	15	9	2	65	35	+30	54	1st	Promotion to 2012 V-League
2012 V-League	26	12	10	4	43	23	+20	46	3rd	Qualified for 2013 AFC Cup
2013 V.League 1	0	0	0	0	0	0	0	0	12th	Withdrew

== Performance in AFC competitions ==
- AFC Cup: 1 appearance

2013: Group stage

Season	Competition	Round	Club	Home	Away
2013	AFC Cup	Group stage	(Singapore) Tampines Rovers FC	2–2	3–2
2013	AFC Cup	Group stage	(India) East Bengal F.C.	0–0	1–4
2013	AFC Cup	Group stage	(Malaysia) Selangor FA	2–1	1–3
