= Đồng Nai Stadium =

Vietnamese football stadium

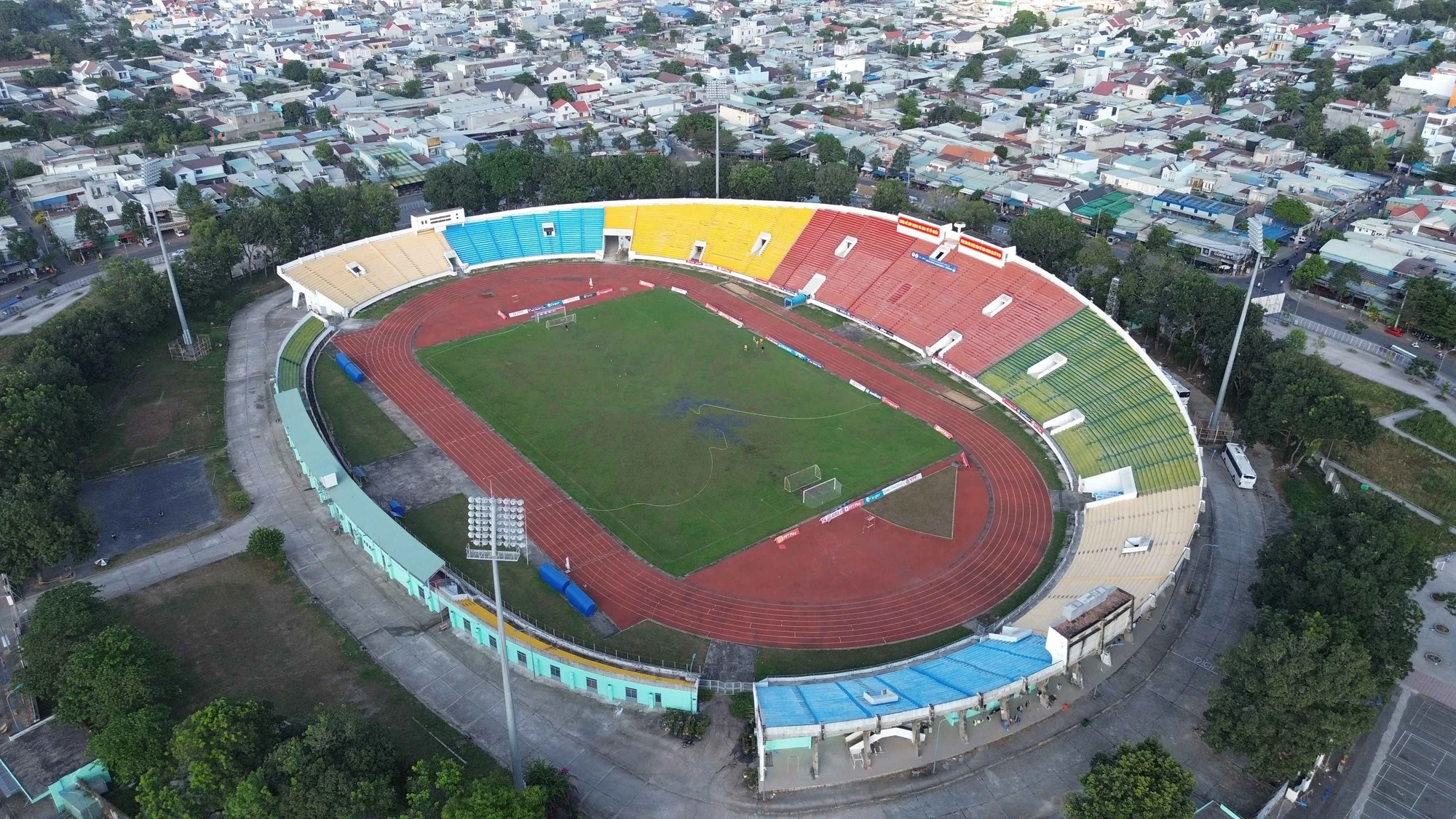
- Dong Nai Stadium seen from above
- Interactive map of Đồng Nai Stadium
- Location: Phạm Văn Khoai Street, Tân Hiệp, Biên Hòa, Đồng Nai Province
- Coordinates: 10°57′42.9″N 106°51′46.1″E
- Owner: Đồng Nai Province
- Capacity: 30,000
- Surface: Grass

Tenant
- Đồng Nai F.C.

Đồng Nai Stadium (Vietnamese: Sân vận động Đồng Nai) is a multi-use stadium located in Biên Hòa City, Đồng Nai Province, Vietnam. The stadium holds 30,000 people and mostly used for football matches. It is the home stadium of Đồng Nai F.C.

== History ==
In 2013, the stadium was fitted with a lighting system which cost over 20 billion Vietnamese đồng (around US$940,000). The whole lighting system was imported from the United States; it is one of the best quality lighting systems for stadia in Vietnam.

In 2014, the stadium had an outdoor track installed which enables it to hold athletics events at national and international level; it cost over 20 billion Vietnamese đồng.
