= Long An Stadium =

Sports venue in Tân An, Vietnam

Coordinates: 10°32′10″N 106°24′30″E

Long An Stadium Stadium
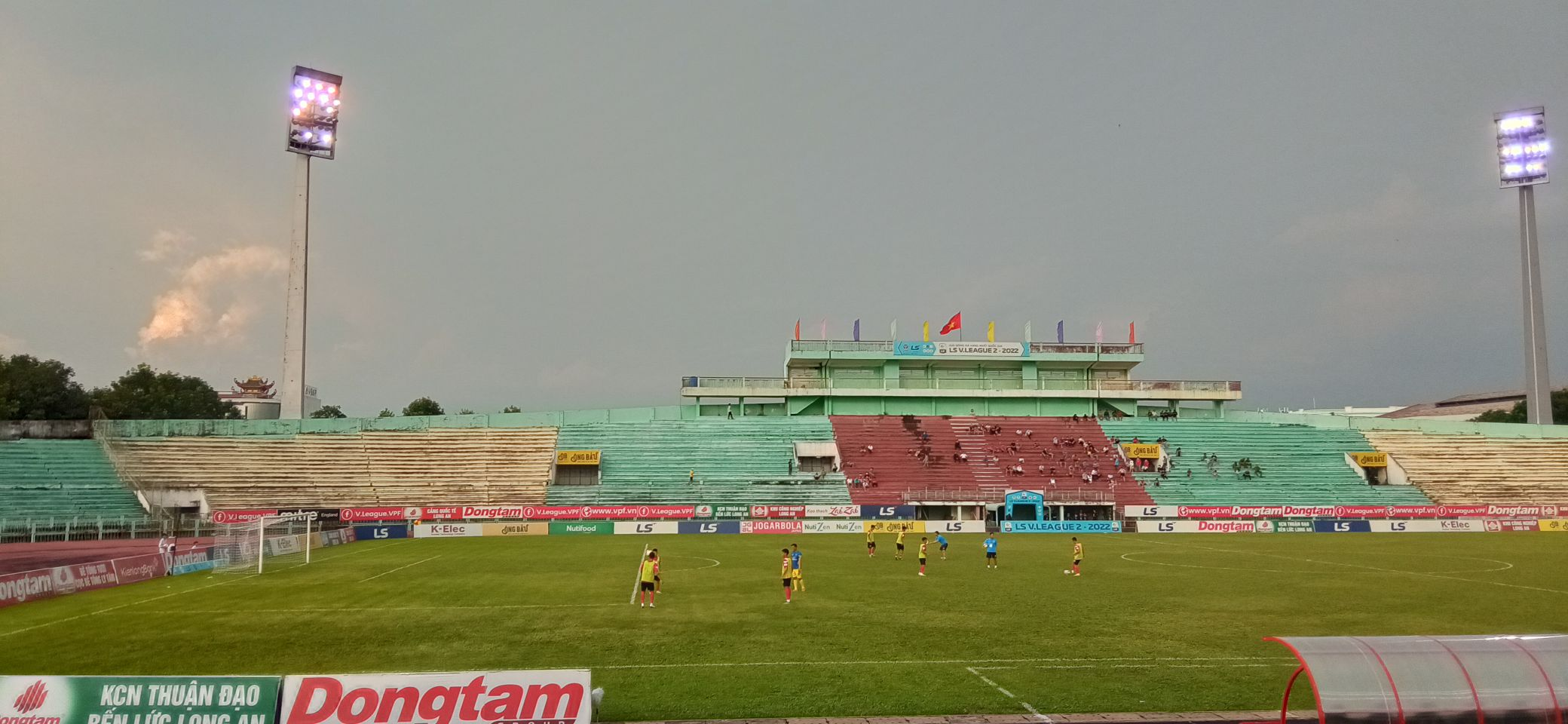
- Interactive map of Long An Stadium Stadium
- Location: Tân An, Vietnam
- Capacity: 19,975

Tenant
- Long An F.C.

Long An Stadium, officially Sân vận động Long An, is a multi-purpose stadium in Tân An, Vietnam. It is currently used mostly for football matches and is the home stadium of Dong Tam, also known as ÐTLA. The stadium holds 19,975 people.
