= Khanh Hoa FC (1976) =

Vietnamese football club

Khatoco Khánh Hoà
- Full name: Khatoco Khánh Hoà Football Club
- Founded: 1976; 50 years ago as Phú Khánh
- Dissolved: 2012; 14 years ago
- Ground: Nha Trang Stadium; Nha Trang, Khanh Hoa, Vietnam
- Capacity: 25,000
- Final season 2012: V.League, 10th
Home colours	Away colours	Third colours

Khatoco Khánh Hoà was a Vietnamese football club based in Nha Trang, Khánh Hòa. They played in the top division in Vietnamese football, V.League 1, before being rebranded as Khanh Hoa FC in 2012. Their home stadium is Nha Trang Stadium.

== History ==
=== Beginnings ===
The predecessor of the team was Phu Khanh football team, established in 1976. Is an amateur football team representing the Phu Khanh province. Team started participating in Vietnam Football Championship since 1980 and achieved good results for many consecutive seasons. In 1987 National Football Championship, the team reached the semi-finals and placed 4th.

At the end of Class Division 1989, the team was placed in the A1 League. In the same year, the province Phu Khanh split into two provinces Phu Yen and Khanh Hoa, the team was transferred to Khanh Hoa province to manage under the name. Khanh Hoa football team. In the 1991 season, the team competed successfully and won promotion. However, the team could not maintain its form in the fifth season Vietnam National Football Championship 1992, and had to accept to play again in the A1 League. The team returned to play in Vietnam National Football Championship 1995 and maintained its position in the following seasons.

At 2000-2001 V-League, the team had the worst performance in the tournament with only 7 points after 18 matches (1 win, 4 matches). draws and 13 losses), scored 15 goals and conceded 36 goals. But in those 15 goals, Dang Dao, the team's main striker, held up to 11 goals that the team scored. This poor result also affected the First Division in the 2001–2002 season. Due to a player crisis, the team had a bad performance and had to be relegated to the Second Division next year.

In 2004 season, under the sponsorship of Khanh Viet Corporation of the manager Nguyen Xuan Hoang, the team played quite successfully and won the championship Second Division, won a place to compete in First Division.

On 1 November 2004, the team officially switched to a professional football club model when the Provincial People's Committee Khanh Hoa officially handed over the team to Khanh Viet Corporation under the name of new is Khatoco Khanh Hoa Football Club.

At First Division 2005, the team successfully competed with 41 points, including 12 wins, 5 draws and 5 losses, gaining the right to compete at V.League. Despite winning the First Division championship, the team's number of wins was even less than Tien Giang.

In the professional tournament, right in the first season Khatoco Khanh Hoa attended, The team ranked 6th and won the style award. In the following seasons, the team often dived in the middle of the rankings, sometimes even ranked 11th. The club's best performance in this period was 4th place in 2010.

=== Model Transformation and Dissolution ===
During 7 years of playing with a semi-professional model, in early December 2011, the project to establish Khanh Hoa Football Joint Stock Company was approved by the People's Committee of Khanh Hoa province, completely transforming the club. Khanh Hoa football from a semi-professional model to a professional model. However, after the end of the 2012 season, due to financial difficulties, the club's leadership decided to sell the 2013 V.League ticket to Vicem Haiphong, along with many players of the first team, only a few pillars and the coaching staff were retained to supplement the reserves squad. The team also decided to withdraw from the 2013 V.League 2.

== Notable players ==
- (Vietnam) Lê Tấn Tài
- (Vietnam) Đặng Đạo
- (Vietnam) Võ Văn Hạnh
- (Vietnam) Đào Văn Phong
- (Vietnam) Hoàng Anh Tuấn
- (Ghana) Felix Aboagye
- (Ghana) Lê Văn Tân

== Achievements ==
=== National competitions ===
League

- V.League 2:
  - (gold) Winners: 2005
- Second League:
  - (gold) Winners: 2004

=== Other competitions ===
- KTV Cup:
  - (gold) Winners: 2005

== Managers ==
- (Austria) Alfred Riedl
- (Vietnam) Nguyen Ngoc Hao (2006)
- (Vietnam) Le Huu Tuong (Nov 2006 – Feb 2007)
- (Vietnam) Hoàng Anh Tuấn (Jan 2007–2012)
