= Vinh Stadium =

Multi-use stadium in Vinh, Vietnam

Coordinates: 18°40′08″N 105°40′10″E

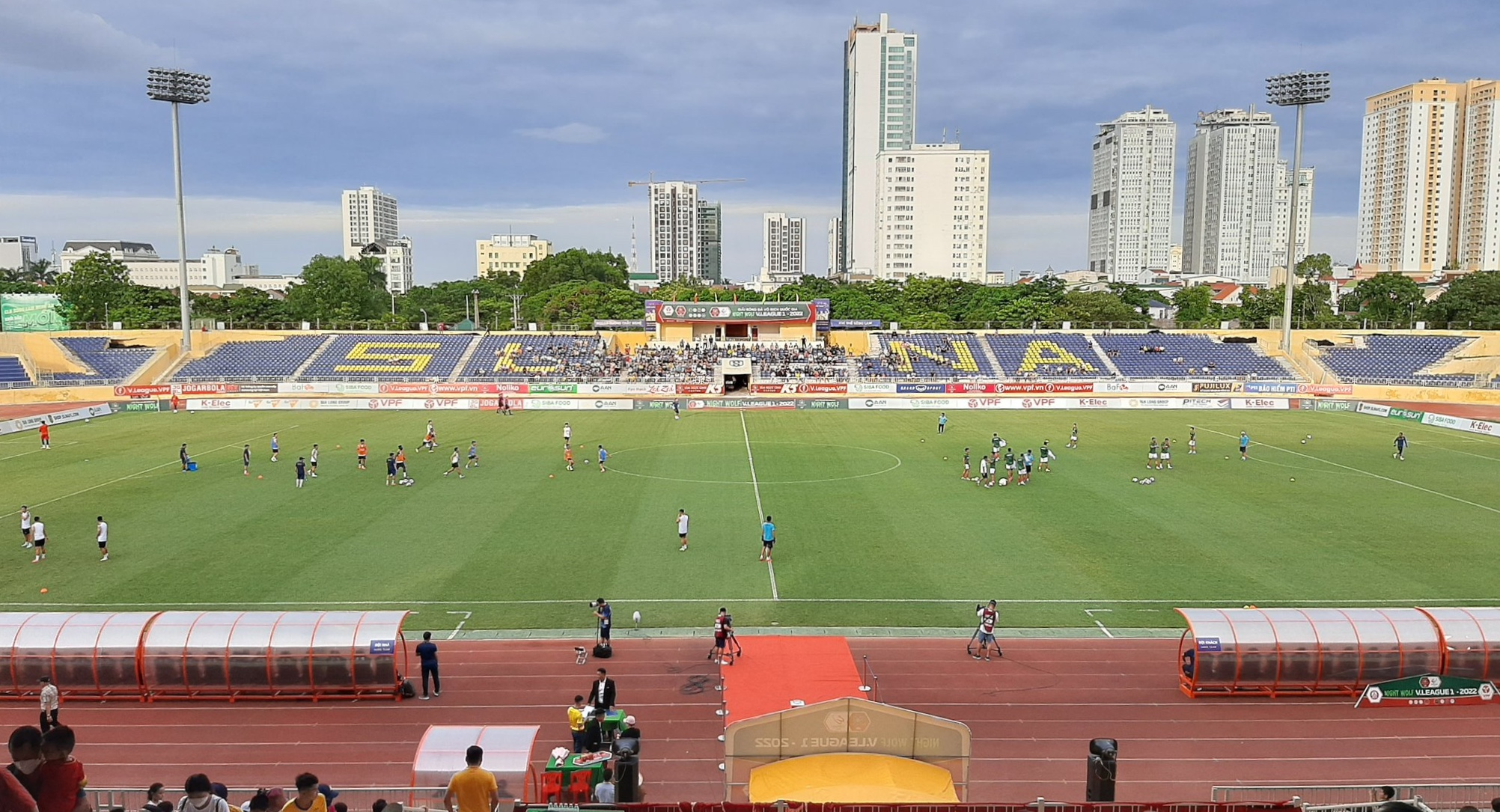
- Vinh Stadium in a match of the 2022 V.League 1
- Interactive map of Vinh Stadium
- Location: Vinh, Nghệ An, Vietnam
- Capacity: 18,000

Construction
- Opened: 2003

Tenant
- Sông Lam Nghệ An F.C.

Vinh Stadium, Sân vận động Vinh in Vietnamese, is a multi-use stadium in Vinh, Vietnam. It is currently used mostly for football matches and is the home stadium of Sông Lam Nghệ An F.C., the stadium also shared to Hồng Lĩnh Hà Tĩnh FC in 2025. The stadium has a capacity of 12,000.

== History ==
Vinh Stadium was built in 1973 with the support of the Federal Republic of Germany. When the first 2001-02 V.League season started, Vinh Stadium was rebuilt. In 2016, about 6,000 seats were added to Vinh Stadium's B stand to serve the 2016 Phu Dong Sports Festival.
