= Chi Lăng Stadium (1954) =

Sports venue in Vietnam

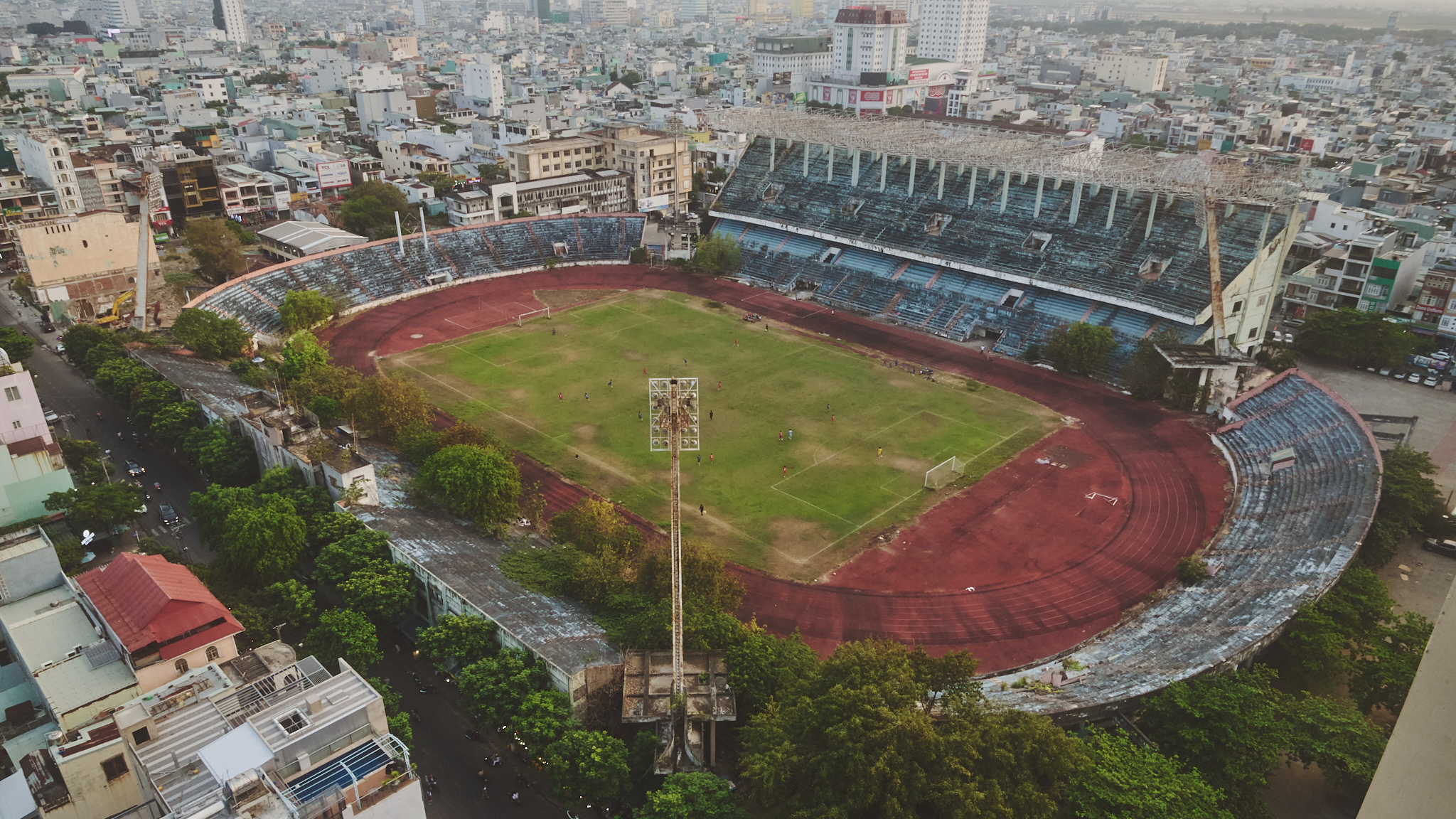
- Chi Lang Stadium in 2024
- Interactive map of Chi Lăng Stadium
- Location: Đà Nẵng, Vietnam
- Coordinates: 16°04′11″N 108°12′59″E
- Capacity: 30,000

Construction
- Opened: 1954
- Closed: 2026

Tenant
- SHB Đà Nẵng (1976–2016)

Chi Lăng Stadium (Vietnamese: Sân vận động Chi Lăng) was a multi-purpose stadium in Đà Nẵng, Vietnam.

Built on the banks of the Hàn River in 1954, the stadium played host to a number of memorable games, most notably Vietnam's 3–2 win over China at the 2000 AFC U-17 Championship, featuring goals from future star Phạm Văn Quyến.

The stadium was also used for the opening and closing ceremonies of the 2016 Asian Beach Games.

The stadium was the home stadium of SHB Đà Nẵng of the V.League 1 until 2016, when the club moved to the Hòa Xuân Stadium. The stadium was due to be demolished in early 2018 to make way for two 33-storey blocks of flats, but that effectively was delayed and the stadium lies in an abandoned state, with trees growing in the stands.

In 2025, the stadium hosted a few home games matches of SHB Đà Nẵng's reserves team in the 2025 Vietnamese Second Division.

In September 2026, the stadium's demolition was completed to facilitate site clearance and the auctioning of land assets.

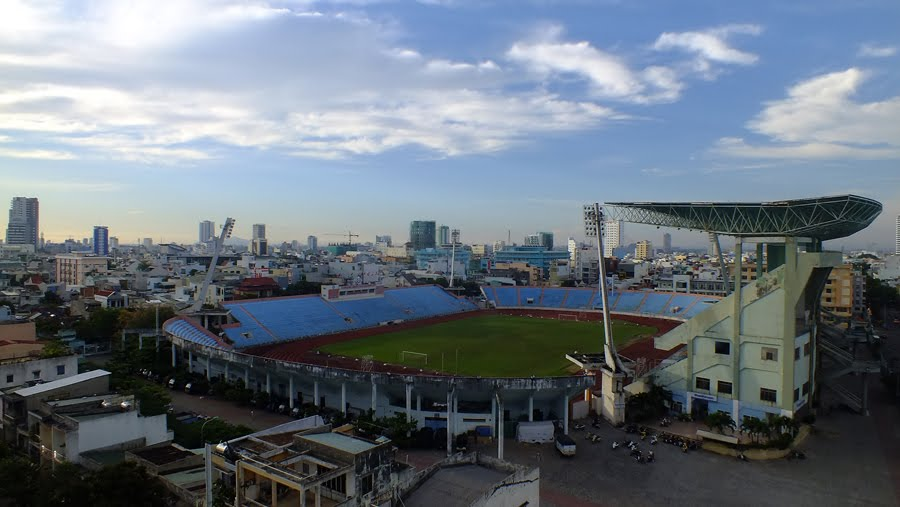
Overall

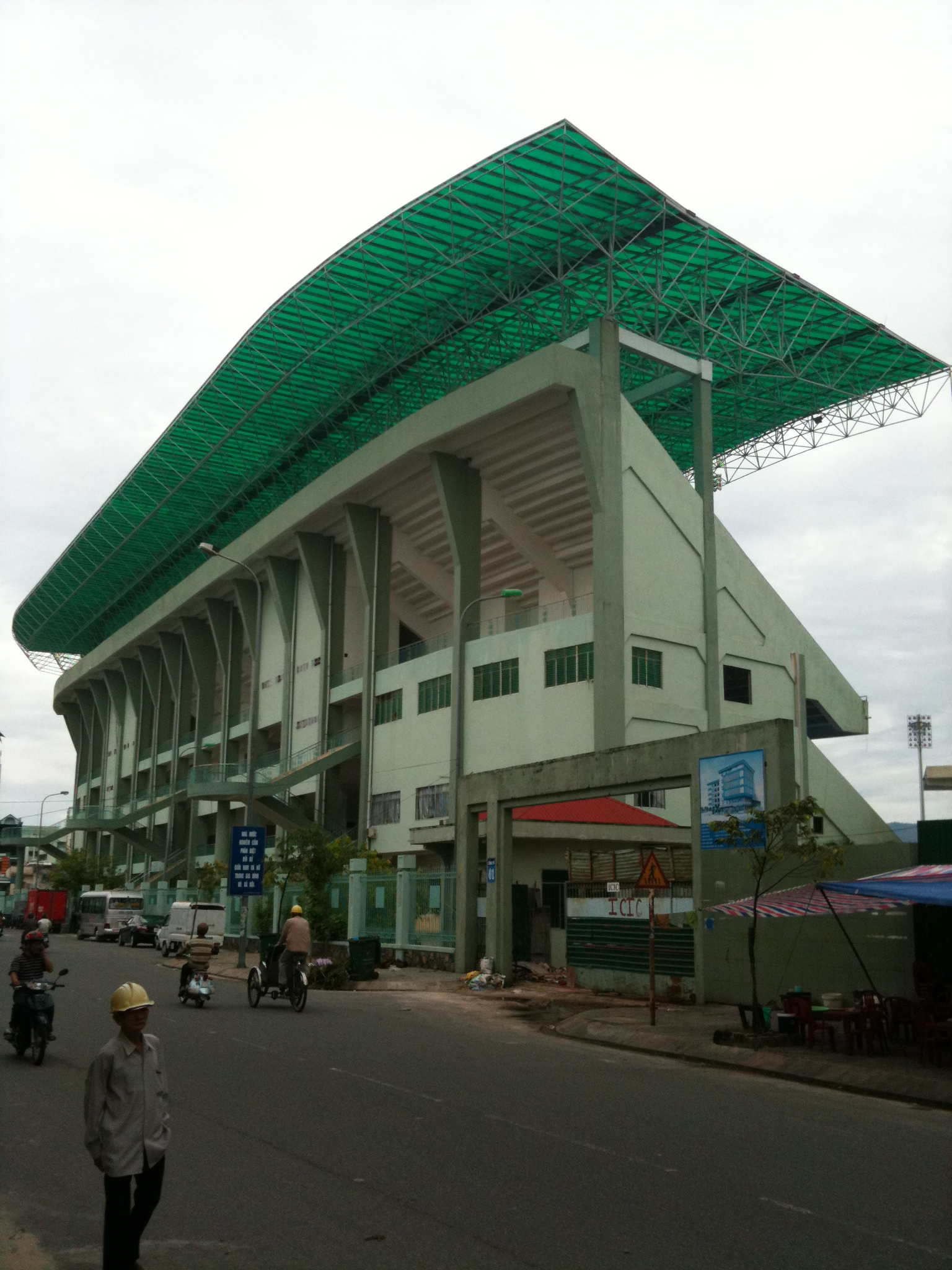
Outside the stadium

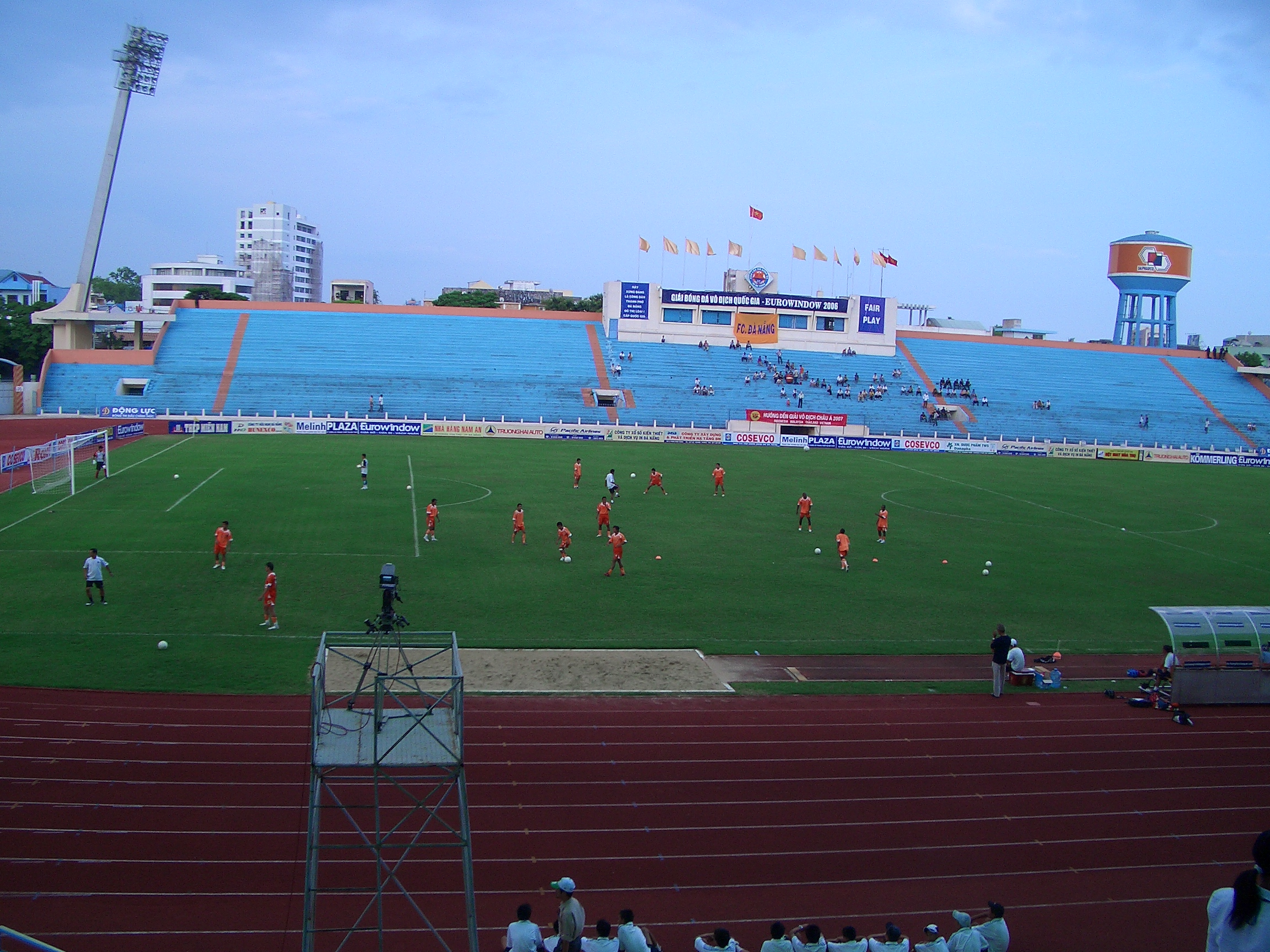
In a match
