= 2012 V-League =

V-League
- Season: 2012
- Dates: 31 December 2011 – 19 August 2012
- Champions: SHB Đà Nẵng; 3rd title
- Runner up: Hà Nội T&T
- Relegated: TĐCS Đồng Tháp
- AFC Cup: SHB Đà Nẵng; Sài Gòn Xuân Thành
- Matches: 182
- Goals: 516 (2.84 per match)
- Top goalscorer: (Nigeria) Timothy Anjembe (17 goals)

The 2012 V-League season was the 29th season of Vietnam's national football league and the 12th as a professional league. The season started on 31 December 2011 and finished on 19 August 2012. On 15 December it was announced that the league would change name and would simply be known as the Premier League. Then, it was changed name to Super League.

== Teams ==
Đồng Tâm Long An were relegated to the 2012 Vietnamese First Division after finishing the 2011 season in the bottom two after a season of upheaval and numerous coaches hired and fired. It was a far fall from grace for the two-time champions.

Hà Nội ACB were also relegated after finishing bottom, but later merged with Hòa Phát Hà Nội to retain their place in the top flight. They were also renamed to Hà Nội.

They were replaced by Vietnamese First Division champions Sài Gòn Xuân Thành who were renamed to Sàigòn for the start of the campaign and then renamed back during mid season. and runners up Kienlongbank Kiên Giang. Kiên Giang are based in the southern city of Rạch Giá.

=== Stadia and locations ===
Locations of the V. League 2012 teams

| Club | Based | Home stadium | Capacity | First season in Super League | Manager |
|---|---|---|---|---|---|
| Becamex Bình Dương | Thủ Dầu Một | Gò Đậu Stadium | 18,250 | 2004 | (South Korea) Cho Yoon-Hwan |
| TĐCS Đồng Tháp | Cao Lãnh | Cao Lãnh Stadium | 23,000 | 2000 | (Vietnam) Trần Công Minh |
| Hà Nội | Hà Nội | Hàng Đẫy Stadium | 22,500 | 2003 | |
| Hoàng Anh Gia Lai | Pleiku | Pleiku Stadium | 12,000 | 2003 | (South Korea) Choi Yun-Kyum |
| Khatoco Khánh Hòa | Nha Trang | August 19th Stadium | 15,000 | 2000 | (Vietnam) Hoàng Anh Tuấn |
| Kienlongbank Kiên Giang | Rạch Giá | Rạch Giá Stadium | 10,000 | 2012 | (Vietnam) Lại Hồng Vân |
| Thanh Hóa | Thanh Hóa | Thanh Hóa Stadium | 14,000 | 2010 | (Vietnam) Triệu Quang Hà |
| Navibank Sài Gòn | Hồ Chí Minh City | Thống Nhất Stadium | 25,000 | 2010 | (Vietnam) Mai Đức Chung |
| SHB Đà Nẵng | Đà Nẵng | Chi Lăng Stadium | 30,000 | 2001 | (Vietnam) Lê Huỳnh Đức |
| Sài Gòn Xuân Thành | Hồ Chí Minh City | Thống Nhất Stadium | 25,000 | 2012 | (Vietnam) Trần Tiến Đại (interim) |
| Sông Lam Nghệ An | Vinh | Vinh Stadium | 20,000 | 2000 | (Vietnam) Nguyễn Hữu Thắng |
| Hà Nội T&T | Hà Nội | Hàng Đẫy Stadium | 22,500 | 2008 | (Vietnam) Phan Thanh Hùng |
| Vicem Hải Phòng | Hải Phòng | Lạch Tray Stadium | 28,000 | 2000 | (Vietnam) Lê Thụy Hải |
| The Vissai Ninh Bình | Ninh Bình | Ninh Bình Stadium | 22,050 | 2010 | (Vietnam) Nguyễn Văn Sỹ |

=== Ownership changes ===
| Club | New owner | Previous owner | Date |
|---|---|---|---|
| Sài Gòn | Vietnam Football Media JS Company (VFM) | | 1 December 2011 |

=== Managerial changes ===
| Team | Outgoing manager | Manner of departure | Incoming manager |
|---|---|---|---|
| Hoàng Anh Gia Lai | (Vietnam) Huỳnh Văn Ảnh | Contract terminated | (South Korea) Choi Yun-Kyum |
| Vicem Hải Phòng | (Vietnam) Nguyễn Đình Hưng | | (Vietnam) Lê Thụy Hải |
| Sài Gòn Xuân Thành | (Vietnam) Lư Đình Tuấn | Sacked | (Vietnam) Trần Tiến Đại (interim) |
| TĐCS Đồng Tháp | (Vietnam) Trang Văn Thành | Sacked | (Vietnam) Trần Công Minh |
| Becamex Bình Dương | (Vietnam) Đặng Trần Chỉnh | Sacked | (South Korea) Cho Yoon-Hwan |
| Hà Nội | (Vietnam) Nguyễn Thành Vinh | Resigned | (Vietnam) Hoa Mạnh Hưng (interim) |

=== Foreign players ===
| Club | Visa 1 | Visa 2 | Visa 3 | Visa 4 | Non-Visa Foreign | Former Player(s) |
|---|---|---|---|---|---|---|
| Becamex Bình Dương | (South Africa) Philani | (Nigeria) Kpenosen Samson | (Netherlands) Danny van Bakel | (Uganda) Brian Umony | (Brazil) Hélio Mykola Lytovka (Nigeria) Theophilus Esele | (Uganda) Brian Umony |
| TĐCS Đồng Tháp | (Nigeria) Hammed Adesope | (Nigeria) Felix Gbenga Ajala | (Nigeria) Sunday Chibuike Ibeji | (Jamaica) Hodges Devon Derron | (Nigeria) Maxwell Eyerakpo | Sydney Plaatjies |
| Navibank Sài Gòn | (Togo) Vincent Bossou | (Colombia) Edison Fonseca | (Nigeria) Aniekan Okon | (Trinidad and Tobago) Willis Plaza | (Brazil) Fabio dos Santos (Thailand) Nirut Surasiang | (Brazil) Ricardinho |
| SHB Đà Nẵng | (Argentina) Gaston Merlo | (Argentina) Nicolás Hernández | Klečkarovski Nikolče | (Hungary) Krisztián Timár | | (Netherlands) Alexander Prent |
| Hà Nội | (Nigeria) Timothy Anjembe | (Sierra Leone) Aluspah Brewah | (Cameroon) Yves Simplice Mboussi | (Nigeria) Odinaka Ezeocha | (France) Johnny Nguyen | (Sierra Leone) Hassan Koeman Sesay |
| Vicem Hải Phòng | (Brazil) Thiago | (Jamaica) Fagan Andre Diego | (Jamaica) Kavin Bryan | (Ghana) Edmund O. Ansah | | |
| Kienlongbank Kiên Giang | (Nigeria) Ganiyu Bolaji Oseni | (Ghana) Joseph Hendricks | (Italy) Speranza Giovanni | (Netherlands) Daal Dyron Rudolph | (Cameroon) Tcheuko Elmakoua Benoit | (Nigeria) Akindele Abraham (Nigeria) Friday Ibeji |
| Hoàng Anh Gia Lai | (Brazil) Evaldo | (Nigeria) Bassey Akpan | (Brazil) Paulo Ernesto Perreira | (Nigeria) Olushola Olumuyiwa Aganun | (Thailand) Sakda Joemdee (Brazil) Marcelo Barbieri | (Uganda) Kasule Owen |
| Khatoco Khánh Hòa | (Ghana) Issfu Anssah | (Brazil) Agostinho | (Zimbabwe) Justice Majabvi | (Angola) José Pereira | (Ghana) Jonathan Quartey | |
| Sài Gòn Xuân Thành | (Cameroon) Christian Nsi Amougou | (Uganda) Moses Oloya | (Uganda) Geoffrey Kizito | (Brazil) Antonio Carlos | (Brazil) Huỳnh Kesley Alves (Zimbabwe) Tostao Kwashi (Brazil) Rogerio M. Pereira | |
| Hà Nội T&T | (Argentina) Gonzalo Marronkle | (Brazil) Cristiano Roland | (Ghana) Attram Kwame | (Nigeria) Samson Kayode | | (Ghana) Attram Kwame |
| Sông Lam Nghệ An | (Senegal) Abass Cheikh Dieng | (Trinidad and Tobago) Hughton Hector | (Cameroon) Bebbe Gustave Anicet | (Nigeria) Dickson Nwakaeme | (Cameroon) Thierry N'Gale Jiemon | (Trinidad and Tobago) Shahdon Winchester |
| Thanh Hóa | (Ghana) Micheal Andrew | (Nigeria) Sunday Emmanuel | (Brazil) Gilson C. Da Silva | (Ethiopia) Fikru Teferra | (Uganda) Wandwasi Rodgers | |
| The Vissai Ninh Bình | (Brazil) Gustavo | (Brazil) Rodrigo Mota | (Ivory Coast) Moussa Sanogo | (Ghana) Ibrahim Abdul Razak | (Nigeria) Dio Preye | (Brazil) Rodrigo Mota |

== League table ==
| Pos | Team | Pld | W | D | L | GF | GA | GD | Pts | Qualification or relegation |
|---|---|---|---|---|---|---|---|---|---|---|
| 1 | SHB Đà Nẵng (C) | 26 | 14 | 6 | 6 | 47 | 31 | +16 | 48 | 2013 AFC Cup Group stage |
| 2 | Hà Nội T&T | 26 | 13 | 8 | 5 | 43 | 35 | +8 | 47 | |
| 3 | Xuân Thành Sài Gòn | 26 | 12 | 10 | 4 | 43 | 23 | +20 | 46 | 2013 AFC Cup Group stage (Note: Qualified by winning the 2012 Vietnamese Cup.) |
| 4 | Sông Lam Nghệ An | 26 | 9 | 14 | 3 | 44 | 30 | +14 | 41 | |
| 5 | Hoàng Anh Gia Lai | 26 | 11 | 6 | 9 | 33 | 33 | 0 | 39 | |
| 6 | Becamex Bình Dương | 26 | 10 | 6 | 10 | 32 | 31 | +1 | 36 | |
| 7 | Navibank Sài Gòn | 26 | 8 | 11 | 7 | 32 | 30 | +2 | 35 | |
| 8 | Vissai Ninh Bình | 26 | 10 | 3 | 13 | 40 | 49 | −9 | 33 | |
| 9 | Hà Nội | 26 | 9 | 5 | 12 | 46 | 47 | −1 | 32 | |
| 10 | Khatoco Khánh Hòa | 26 | 9 | 5 | 12 | 33 | 34 | −1 | 32 | |
| 11 | Thanh Hóa | 26 | 9 | 5 | 12 | 32 | 36 | −4 | 32 | |
| 12 | Kienlongbank Kiên Giang | 26 | 9 | 5 | 12 | 30 | 39 | −9 | 32 | |
| 13 | TĐCS Đồng Tháp (R) | 26 | 7 | 9 | 10 | 32 | 38 | −6 | 30 | Relegation to Vietnamese First Division |
| 14 | Hải Phòng | 26 | 3 | 5 | 18 | 27 | 59 | −32 | 14 | |

Updated to match(es) played on 19 August 2012. Source: Soccerway
Rules for classification: 1) points; 2) goal difference; 3) number of goals scored.
(C) Champions; (R) Relegated

=== Positions by round ===
| Team ╲ Round | 1 | 2 | 3 | 4 | 5 | 6 | 7 | 8 | 9 | 10 | 11 | 12 | 13 | 14 | 15 | 16 | 17 | 18 | 19 | 20 | 21 | 22 | 23 | 24 | 25 | 26 |
|---|---|---|---|---|---|---|---|---|---|---|---|---|---|---|---|---|---|---|---|---|---|---|---|---|---|---|
| SHB Đà Nẵng | 3 | 3 | 1 | 3 | 4 | 3 | 3 | 3 | 3 | 4 | 5 | 2 | 1 | 2 | 2 | 2 | 3 | 2 | 2 | 2 | 1 | 1 | 2 | 2 | 3 | 1 |
| Hà Nội T&T | 4 | 1 | 2 | 1 | 1 | 1 | 1 | 1 | 2 | 2 | 1 | 1 | 2 | 1 | 1 | 1 | 1 | 1 | 1 | 1 | 2 | 2 | 1 | 1 | 1 | 2 |
| Xuân Thành Sài Gòn | 5 | 9 | 3 | 2 | 2 | 2 | 2 | 2 | 1 | 1 | 3 | 5 | 6 | 3 | 3 | 3 | 2 | 3 | 3 | 3 | 3 | 3 | 3 | 3 | 2 | 3 |
| Sông Lam Nghệ An | 9 | 4 | 4 | 6 | 7 | 6 | 5 | 5 | 6 | 7 | 4 | 3 | 4 | 5 | 6 | 5 | 5 | 4 | 4 | 4 | 4 | 4 | 4 | 4 | 4 | 4 |
| Hoàng Anh Gia Lai | 1 | 2 | 6 | 10 | 8 | 8 | 7 | 4 | 5 | 5 | 6 | 6 | 3 | 4 | 4 | 4 | 4 | 5 | 6 | 7 | 5 | 7 | 8 | 6 | 6 | 5 |
| Becamex Bình Dương | 2 | 5 | 10 | 5 | 6 | 5 | 6 | 7 | 4 | 3 | 2 | 4 | 5 | 6 | 7 | 8 | 6 | 8 | 8 | 8 | 8 | 8 | 6 | 5 | 5 | 6 |
| Navibank Sài Gòn | 5 | 8 | 12 | 8 | 11 | 12 | 9 | 11 | 11 | 9 | 8 | 7 | 8 | 10 | 10 | 10 | 8 | 6 | 5 | 5 | 9 | 6 | 7 | 8 | 7 | 7 |
| Vissai Ninh Bình | 5 | 12 | 7 | 4 | 3 | 4 | 4 | 6 | 7 | 6 | 7 | 9 | 11 | 11 | 13 | 12 | 13 | 11 | 10 | 6 | 6 | 5 | 5 | 7 | 8 | 8 |
| Hà Nội | 12 | 14 | 8 | 12 | 12 | 9 | 10 | 8 | 9 | 10 | 11 | 10 | 9 | 7 | 8 | 9 | 7 | 10 | 7 | 10 | 10 | 9 | 9 | 10 | 11 | 9 |
| Khatoco Khánh Hòa | 11 | 6 | 9 | 12 | 9 | 11 | 11 | 9 | 8 | 8 | 12 | 11 | 10 | 9 | 9 | 11 | 12 | 13 | 13 | 13 | 13 | 13 | 12 | 11 | 10 | 10 |
| Thanh Hóa | 9 | 10 | 5 | 9 | 10 | 10 | 12 | 12 | 12 | 12 | 9 | 8 | 7 | 8 | 5 | 6 | 9 | 7 | 9 | 9 | 7 | 10 | 10 | 9 | 9 | 11 |
| Kienlongbank Kiên Giang | 14 | 7 | 11 | 13 | 13 | 14 | 14 | 14 | 13 | 13 | 13 | 13 | 12 | 12 | 11 | 7 | 10 | 12 | 12 | 12 | 12 | 12 | 11 | 12 | 12 | 12 |
| TĐCS Đồng Tháp | 5 | 11 | 13 | 7 | 5 | 7 | 8 | 10 | 10 | 11 | 10 | 12 | 13 | 13 | 12 | 13 | 11 | 9 | 11 | 11 | 11 | 11 | 13 | 13 | 13 | 13 |
| Hải Phòng | 13 | 13 | 14 | 14 | 14 | 13 | 13 | 13 | 14 | 14 | 14 | 14 | 14 | 14 | 14 | 14 | 14 | 14 | 14 | 14 | 14 | 14 | 14 | 14 | 14 | 14 |

Source: Eximbank Super League

== Results ==
=== Summary ===
| Home \ Away | BBD | SDN | TDT | VHP | HAN | HGL | KKH | KKG | NVB | XTS | SNA | T&T | THO | VNB |
|---|---|---|---|---|---|---|---|---|---|---|---|---|---|---|
| Becamex Bình Dương | | 1–2 | 1–0 | 5–3 | 3–1 | 1–2 | 0–2 | 2–0 | 1–1 | 1–1 | 0–0 | 1–3 | 4–1 | 3–1 |
| SHB Đà Nẵng | 1–0 | | 0–1 | 2–1 | 2–0 | 4–1 | 3–2 | 2–2 | 0–0 | 2–1 | 1–1 | 2–0 | 1–0 | 3–0 |
| TĐCS Đồng Tháp | 0–0 | 3–3 | | 3–0 | 2–2 | 0–0 | 3–1 | 1–3 | 3–1 | 0–4 | 0–1 | 1–3 | 3–2 | 4–1 |
| Hải Phòng | 0–1 | 2–3 | 1–1 | | 1–1 | 2–0 | 3–1 | 1–3 | 1–1 | 2–3 | 2–2 | 0–2 | 2–0 | 0–3 |
| Hà Nội | 4–1 | 3–3 | 2–1 | 5–0 | | 3–2 | 4–1 | 1–3 | 1–1 | 0–1 | 0–0 | 0–1 | 3–1 | 1–2 |
| Hoàng Anh Gia Lai | 2–0 | 2–0 | 1–0 | 3–1 | 2–1 | | 0–0 | 3–0 | 0–2 | 0–3 | 2–2 | 0–0 | 2–0 | 2–1 |
| Khatoco Khánh Hòa | 1–1 | 1–2 | 1–0 | 1–0 | 1–2 | 3–0 | | 1–0 | 3–0 | 2–2 | 1–0 | 1–1 | 0–1 | 4–0 |
| Kienlongbank Kiên Giang | 1–0 | 2–1 | 0–2 | 1–0 | 2–1 | 2–3 | 1–0 | | 2–0 | 0–2 | 0–3 | 1–1 | 0–0 | 0–0 |
| Navibank Sài Gòn | 0–1 | 3–1 | 0–0 | 2–2 | 4–1 | 0–0 | 1–0 | 3–1 | | 2–2 | 1–1 | 2–0 | 2–0 | 1–2 |
| Xuân Thành Sài Gòn | 0–1 | 2–1 | 3–1 | 4–0 | 2–0 | 1–1 | 2–1 | 1–0 | 1–1 | | 2–2 | 0–0 | 0–0 | 4–1 |
| Sông Lam Nghệ An | 1–1 | 0–4 | 0–0 | 5–2 | 2–0 | 2–0 | 3–1 | 2–2 | 1–1 | 1–1 | | 2–2 | 0–0 | 5–3 |
| Hà Nội T&T | 1–0 | 2–1 | 1–1 | 2–1 | 3–1 | 1–3 | 1–1 | 2–1 | 3–1 | 1–0 | 2–6 | | 3–2 | 2–3 |
| Thanh Hóa | 2–1 | 0–0 | 4–0 | 3–0 | 3–5 | 2–1 | 1–2 | 2–1 | 2–0 | 1–1 | 2–0 | 2–4 | | 1–0 |
| Vissai Ninh Bình | 1–2 | 1–3 | 2–2 | 2–0 | 2–3 | 2–1 | 3–1 | 4–1 | 1–2 | 2–0 | 0–2 | 2–2 | 1–0 | |

Updated to match(es) played on 19 August 2012. Source: Eximbank V-League
Legend: Blue = home team win; Yellow = draw; Red = away team win.

=== Matches ===
==== Match-day 1 ====
31 December 2011
16:10

| Hoàng Anh Gia Lai | 3–1 | Vicem Hải Phòng |
|---|---|---|
| Evaldo 41', 68'; Kasule 70' | Report | dos Santos 77' |

Pleiku Stadium
Attendance: 3,000
Referee: Hoàng Anh Tuấn

31 December 2011
18:50

| Becamex Bình Dương | 2–0 | Kienlongbank Kiên Giang |
|---|---|---|
| Fortune 27'; Tăng Tuấn 89' | Report |

Gò Đậu Stadium, Thủ Dầu Một
Attendance: 5,000
Referee: Võ Minh Trí

1 January 2012
16:20

| Sông Lam Nghệ An | 0–0 | Thanh Hóa |
|---|---|---|
| | Report |

Vinh Stadium
Attendance: 8,000
Referee: Phùng Đình Dũng

1 January 2012
16:10

| Navibank Sài Gòn | 2–2 | Sài Gòn |
|---|---|---|
| Tài Em 31'; Khánh Lâm 64' | Report | Oloya 12'; Nsi 44' |

Thống Nhất Stadium, Hồ Chí Minh City
Attendance: 10,000
Referee: Nguyễn Trọng Thư

1 January 2012
16:10

| Hà Nội | 0–1 | Hà Nội T&T |
|---|---|---|
| | Report | Roland 53' |

Hàng Đẫy Stadium, Hà Nội
Attendance: 3,000
Referee: Vũ Bảo Linh

1 January 2012
16:10

| The Vissai Ninh Bình | 2–2 | TĐCS Đồng Tháp |
|---|---|---|
| Farias 14' (pen.); Dourado 24' | Report | Ajala 27'; Chibuike 45+1' |

Ninh Bình Stadium
Attendance: 5,000
Referee: Đào Văn Cường

1 January 2012
16:20

| SHB Đà Nẵng | 3–2 | Khatoco Khánh Hòa |
|---|---|---|
| Minh Phương 19'; Hùng Sơn 36'; Merlo 66' | Report | Tấn Tài 33'; Văn Tân 78' |

Chi Lăng Stadium, Đà Nẵng
Attendance: 8,000
Referee: Bùi Thành Thanh Nghĩa

==== Match-day 2 ====
7 January 2012
16:10

| Vicem Hải Phòng | 1–1 | Navibank Sài Gòn |
|---|---|---|
| Rodrigo 90+2' | Report | Quang Hải 38' |

Lạch Tray Stadium, Hải Phòng
Attendance: 18,000
Referee: Võ Quang Vinh

7 January 2012
16:10

| TĐCS Đồng Tháp | 0–1 | Sông Lam Nghệ An |
|---|---|---|
| | Report | Dieng 20' |

Cao Lãnh Stadium
Attendance: 7,000
Referee: Hoàng Phạm Công Khánh

7 January 2012
16:30

| Kienlongbank Kiên Giang | 3–2 | Hà Nội |
|---|---|---|
| Oseni 45+1'; Tuluwase 72', 85' | Report | Brewah 37'; Anjembe 90+2' |

Rạch Giá Stadium
Attendance: 6,000
Referee: Bùi Quang Thông

7 January 2012
18:30

| Sài Gòn | 1–1 | Hoàng Anh Gia Lai |
|---|---|---|
| Alves 90+4' | Report | Đức Dương 36' |

Thống Nhất Stadium, Hồ Chí Minh City
Attendance: 10,000
Referee: Đinh Văn Dũng

8 January 2012
16:00

| Hà Nội T&T | 1–0 | Becamex Bình Dương |
|---|---|---|
| Văn Quyết 24' | Report |

Hàng Đẫy Stadium, Hà Nội
Attendance: 4,000
Referee: Nguyễn Phi Long

8 January 2012
16:10

| Thanh Hóa | 0–0 | SHB Đà Nẵng |
|---|---|---|
| | Report |

Thanh Hóa Stadium
Attendance: 8,000
Referee: Phùng Đình Dũng

8 January 2012
17:00

| Khatoco Khánh Hòa | 4–0 | The Vissai Ninh Bình |
|---|---|---|
| Văn Tân 4'; Hữu Phát 38'; Tấn Tài 66'; Majabvi 75' | Report |

Nha Trang Stadium
Attendance: 6,000
Referee: Ngô Quốc Hưng

==== Match-day 3 ====
14 January 2012
16:10

| Thanh Hóa | 2–1 | Becamex Bình Dương |
|---|---|---|
| Andrew 49' (pen.), 62' | Report | Umony 31' |

Thanh Hóa Stadium
Attendance: 6,000
Referee: Nguyễn Trọng Thư

14 January 2012
16:30

| Kienlongbank Kiên Giang | 0–2 | Sài Gòn |
|---|---|---|
| | Report | Alves 70', 90+5' |

Rạch Giá Stadium
Attendance: 6,000
Referee: Võ Quang Vinh

14 January 2012
16:10

| Hà Nội | 4–1 | Khatoco Khánh Hòa |
|---|---|---|
| Anjembe 41' (pen.), 80' (pen.); Thanh Trung 45', 82' | Report | Oliveira 62'; Văn Học (red card) 79' |

Hàng Đẫy Stadium, Hà Nội
Attendance: 1,000
Referee: Bùi Quang Thông

14 January 2012
16:00

| SHB Đà Nẵng | 4–1 | Hoàng Anh Gia Lai |
|---|---|---|
| Hùng Sơn 42'; Ngọc Thanh 45+1'; Merlo 54'; Prent 72' | Report | Đức Dương 59' |

Chi Lăng Stadium, Đà Nẵng
Attendance: 5,000
Referee: Hoàng Phạm Công Khánh

15 January 2012
16:10

| Vicem Hải Phòng | 1–1 | TĐCS Đồng Tháp |
|---|---|---|
| Bryan 86' | Report | Ajala 43' |

Lạch Tray Stadium, Hải Phòng
Attendance: 9,000
Referee: Trần Trung Hiếu

15 January 2012
16:10

| Sông Lam Nghệ An | 2–2 | Hà Nội T&T |
|---|---|---|
| Hector 24'; Bebbe 90+1' | Report | Duy Nam (yellow card) 15' (yellow-red card) 81'; Kayode 35'; Văn Quyết 90+3' |

Vinh Stadium
Attendance: 9,000
Referee: Vũ Bảo Linh

15 January 2012
18:30

| Navibank Sài Gòn | 1–2 | The Vissai Ninh Bình |
|---|---|---|
| Pereira 84' | Report | Sanogo 59', 88' |

Thống Nhất Stadium, Hồ Chí Minh City
Attendance: 6,000
Referee: Ngô Quốc Hưng

==== Match-day 4 ====
4 February 2012
16:10

| Hoàng Anh Gia Lai | 0–2 | Navibank Sài Gòn |
|---|---|---|
| | Report | Fonseca 50'; Pereira 61' |

Pleiku Stadium
Attendance: 7,000
Referee: Nguyễn Đức Vũ

4 February 2012
16:00

| The Vissai Ninh Bình | 1–0 | Thanh Hóa |
|---|---|---|
| Dourado 38' | Report |

Ninh Bình Stadium
Attendance: 5,000
Referee: Võ Quang Vinh

4 February 2012
18:30

| Sài Gòn | 4–0 | Vicem Hải Phòng |
|---|---|---|
| Nsi 43', 77'; Rodrigues 85', 89' | Report | Trọng Nghĩa (yellow card) 35' (yellow-red card) 36' |

Thống Nhất Stadium, Hồ Chí Minh City
Attendance: 8,000
Referee: Phùng Đình Dũng

5 February 2012
16:10

| TĐCS Đồng Tháp | 3–1 | Khatoco Khánh Hòa |
|---|---|---|
| Thanh Hiền 36'; Ajala 54' (pen.), 86' | Report | Filho 90' |

Cao Lãnh Stadium
Attendance: 5.000
Referee: Hoàng Anh Tuấn

5 February 2012
16:10

| Hà Nội T&T | 2–1 | Kienlongbank Kiên Giang |
|---|---|---|
| Văn Quyết 58', 90+3' | Report | Duy An 89' |

Hàng Đẫy Stadium, Hà Nội
Attendance: 5,000
Referee: Nguyễn Trọng Thư

5 February 2012
16:00

| Becamex Bình Dương | 3–1 | Hà Nội |
|---|---|---|
| Fortune 14'; Tăng Tuấn 21', 69' | Report | Anjembe 8' |

Gò Đậu Stadium, Thủ Dầu Một
Attendance: 8,000
Referee: Võ Minh Trí

5 February 2012
16:00

| SHB Đà Nẵng | 1–1 | Sông Lam Nghệ An |
|---|---|---|
| Merlo 88' | Report | Hector 55' |

Chi Lăng Stadium, Đà Nẵng
Attendance: 15,000
Referee: Ngô Quốc Hưng

==== Match-day 5 ====
11 February 2012
16:10

| Hoàng Anh Gia Lai | 2–1 | Hà Nội |
|---|---|---|
| Cardosc 40'; Filho 65' | Report | Anjembe 13' |

Pleiku Stadium
Attendance: 7,000
Referee: Phùng Quốc Quân

11 February 2012
16:10

| Hà Nội T&T | 3–2 | Thanh Hóa |
|---|---|---|
| Marronkle 23'; Ngọc Duy 40' (pen.), 55' | Report | Emmanuel 29'; Mensah 90+4' (pen.) |

Hàng Đẫy Stadium, Hà Nội
Attendance: 4,000
Referee: Đào Văn Cường

11 February 2012
16:10

| The Vissai Ninh Bình | 2–0 | Vicem Hải Phòng |
|---|---|---|
| Tiến Thành 56'; Dourado 75' | Report |

Ninh Bình Stadium
Attendance: 5,000
Referee: Hoàng Phạm Công Khánh

11 February 2012
18:30

| Becamex Bình Dương | 0–0 | Sông Lam Nghệ An |
|---|---|---|
| | Report |

Gò Đậu Stadium, Thủ Dầu Một
Attendance: 19,500
Referee: Nguyễn Đức Vũ

12 February 2012
16:00

| TĐCS Đồng Tháp | 3–1 | Navibank Sài Gòn |
|---|---|---|
| Ajala 26', 68'; Derron 31' | Report | Quang Hướng 90+3' |

Cao Lãnh Stadium
Attendance: 10,000
Referee: Trần Trung Hiếu

12 February 2012
16:10

| Khatoco Khánh Hòa | 1–0 | Kienlongbank Kiên Giang |
|---|---|---|
| Majabvi 74' | Report |

Nha Trang Stadium
Attendance: 12,000
Referee: Nguyễn Văn Kiên

12 February 2012
18:30

| Sài Gòn | 2–1 | SHB Đà Nẵng |
|---|---|---|
| Alves 33'; Rodrigues 44' | Report | Klechkaroski 60' |

Thống Nhất Stadium, Hồ Chí Minh City
Attendance: 9,000
Referee: Đinh Văn Dũng

==== Match-day 6 ====
18 February 2012
16:00

| Sông Lam Nghệ An | 2–0 | Hoàng Anh Gia Lai |
|---|---|---|
| Hector 2'; Trọng Hoàng 90+1' (pen.) | Report |

Vinh Stadium
Attendance: 6,000
Referee: Võ Quang Vinh

18 February 2012
16:10

| Thanh Hóa | 1–1 | Sài Gòn |
|---|---|---|
| Quốc Phương 59' | Report | Amougou 49' |

Thanh Hóa Stadium
Attendance: 6,000
Referee: Phùng Đình Dũng

18 February 2012
18:30

| Navibank Sài Gòn | 0–1 | Becamex Bình Dương |
|---|---|---|
| | Report | Umony 6' |

Thống Nhất Stadium, Hồ Chí Minh City
Attendance: 5,000
Referee: Vũ Bảo Linh

19 February 2012
16:10

| Vicem Hải Phòng | 3–1 | Khatoco Khánh Hòa |
|---|---|---|
| Đức Thắng 25'; Fagan 42', 82' | Report | Văn Tân 60'; Văn Phong (yellow card) 11' (yellow-red card) 33'; Filho (red card) 36' |

Lạch Tray Stadium, Hải Phòng
Attendance: 13,000
Referee: Hoàng Anh Tuấn

19 February 2012
16:10

| Kienlongbank Kiên Giang | 0–0 | The Vissai Ninh Bình |
|---|---|---|
| | Report |

Rạch Giá Stadium
Attendance: 5,000
Referee: Võ Minh Trí

19 February 2012
16:00

| Hà Nội | 2–1 | TĐCS Đồng Tháp |
|---|---|---|
| Công Vinh 62'; Anjembe 70' | Report | Ajala 25' |

Hàng Đẫy Stadium, Hà Nội
Attendance: 3,000
Referee: Nguyễn Văn Đông

19 February 2012
16:10

| SHB Đà Nẵng | 2–0 | Hà Nội T&T |
|---|---|---|
| Klechkaroski 58'; Merlo 76' | Report |

Chi Lăng Stadium, Đà Nẵng
Attendance: 12,000
Referee: Bùi Thành Thanh Nghĩa

==== Match-day 7 ====
25 February 2012
16:00

| Vicem Hải Phòng | 2–2 | Sông Lam Nghệ An |
|---|---|---|
| Fagan 46'; Đình Tùng 83' | Report | Bebbe 19'; Hồng Việt 74' |

Lạch Tray Stadium, Hải Phòng
Attendance: 18,000
Referee: Vũ Bảo Linh

25 February 2012
16:30

| Kienlongbank Kiên Giang | 2–3 | Hoàng Anh Gia Lai |
|---|---|---|
| Oseni 20', 79' | Report | Filho 46'; Văn Trương 70'; Cardosc 77' |

Rạch Giá Stadium
Attendance: 6,000
Referee: Nguyễn Phi Long

25 February 2012
17:00

| Khatoco Khánh Hòa | 2–2 | Sài Gòn |
|---|---|---|
| Andrade 31', 59' | Report | Nsi 5'; Alves 72' |

Nha Trang Stadium
Attendance: 12,000
Referee: Nguyễn Trung Kiên

25 February 2012
18:30

| Navibank Sài Gòn | 2–0 | Thanh Hóa |
|---|---|---|
| Được Em 57'; Quang Hải 72' | Report | Bật Hiếu (red card) 10' |

Thống Nhất Stadium, Hồ Chí Minh City
Attendance: 5,000
Referee: Nguyễn Trọng Thư

26 February 2012
16:10

| The Vissai Ninh Bình | 2–2 | Hà Nội T&T |
|---|---|---|
| Farias 49' (pen.), 52'; Razak (yellow card) 67' (yellow-red card) 77' | Report | Kayode 6'; Marronkle 90'; Văn Lâm (yellow card) 48' (yellow-red card) 90' |

Ninh Bình Stadium
Attendance: 3,500
Referee: Nguyễn Văn Đông

26 February 2012
16:10

| Hà Nội | 3–3 | SHB Đà Nẵng |
|---|---|---|
| Công Vinh 25'; Anjembe 27'; Thành Lương 76' | Report | Quốc Anh 19'; Merlo 32', 37'; Duy Lam (yellow card) 26' (yellow-red card) 58' |

Hàng Đẫy Stadium, Hà Nội
Attendance: 5,000
Referee: Ngô Quốc Hưng

26 February 2012
16:10

| TĐCS Đồng Tháp | 0–0 | Becamex Bình Dương |
|---|---|---|
| | Report |

Cao Lãnh Stadium
Attendance: 9,000
Referee: Nguyễn Đức Vũ

==== Match-day 8 ====
2 March 2012
17:00

| Sông Lam Nghệ An | 2–2 | Kienlongbank Kiên Giang |
|---|---|---|
| Dieng 56', 88' | Report | Minh Trung 2'; Oseni 86' |

Vinh Stadium
Attendance: 8,000
Referee: Đào Văn Cường

2 March 2012
16:10

| Khatoco Khánh Hòa | 3–0 | Navibank Sài Gòn |
|---|---|---|
| Thanh Tuấn 35'; Hữu Chương 43'; Majabvi 54' | Report |

Nha Trang Stadium
Attendance: 5,000
Referee: Đinh Hải Dương

3 March 2012
16:00

| Thanh Hóa | 3–5 | Hà Nội |
|---|---|---|
| Emmanuel 37'; Hora 45'; Mensah 77' | Report | Công Vinh 13', 90+4'; Ezeocha 58'; Anjembe 66'; Thanh Vân 82' |

Thanh Hóa Stadium
Attendance: 9,000
Referee: Vũ Bảo Linh

3 March 2012
18:30

| Becamex Bình Dương | 1–2 | SHB Đà Nẵng |
|---|---|---|
| Philani 53' | Report | Quốc Anh 70'; Merlo 77' |

Gò Đậu Stadium, Thủ Dầu Một
Attendance: 18,000
Referee: Bùi Thành Thanh Nghĩa

4 March 2012
16:00

| Hoàng Anh Gia Lai | 2–1 | The Vissai Ninh Bình |
|---|---|---|
| Đức Dương 22'; Cardosc 75' | Report | Sanogo 11' |

Pleiku Stadium
Attendance: 9,000
Referee: Hoàng Phạm Công Khánh

4 March 2012
16:10

| Hà Nội T&T | 2–1 | Vicem Hải Phòng |
|---|---|---|
| Kayode 18'; Văn Quyết 52' | Report | Đình Tùng 88' |

Hàng Đẫy Stadium, Hà Nội
Attendance: 7,000
Referee: Đinh Văn Dũng

4 March 2012
18:30

| Sài Gòn | 3–1 | TĐCS Đồng Tháp |
|---|---|---|
| Alves 9', 19'; Carlos 74' | Report | Văn Mộc 35' |

Thống Nhất Stadium, Hồ Chí Minh City
Attendance: 10,000
Referee: Phùng Quốc Quân

==== Match-day 9 ====
10 March 2012
16:10

| Hoàng Anh Gia Lai | 0–0 | Khatoco Khánh Hòa |
|---|---|---|
| | Report | Hữu Phát (yellow card) 57' (yellow-red card) 66' |

Pleiku Stadium
Attendance: 9,000
Referee: Nguyễn Phi Long

10 March 2012
16:00

| SHB Đà Nẵng | 2–2 | Kienlongbank Kiên Giang |
|---|---|---|
| Quốc Anh 16'; Thanh Hưng 72' | Report | Oseni 14', 90+5'; Quang Huy (yellow card) 72' (yellow-red card) 78' |

Chi Lăng Stadium, Đà Nẵng
Attendance: 10,000
Referee: Hoàng Anh Tuấn

10 March 2012
16:10

| Hà Nội T&T | 1–1 | TĐCS Đồng Tháp |
|---|---|---|
| Kayode 51' | Report | Minh Lợi 82' |

Hàng Đẫy Stadium, Hà Nội
Attendance: 3,000
Referee: Nguyễn Đức Vũ

10 March 2012
18:30

| Sài Gòn | 2–0 | Hà Nội |
|---|---|---|
| Carlos 11'; Alves 33' (pen.) | Report |

Thống Nhất Stadium, Hồ Chí Minh City
Attendance: 12,000
Referee: Nguyễn Văn Kiên

11 March 2012
16:00

| Thanh Hóa | 3–0 | Vicem Hải Phòng |
|---|---|---|
| Quốc Phương 45'; Gilmar 66'; Mensah 90+2' | Report |

Thanh Hóa Stadium
Attendance: 9,000
Referee: Võ Minh Trí

11 March 2012
17:00

| Sông Lam Nghệ An | 1–1 | Navibank Sài Gòn |
|---|---|---|
| Hector 3'; Sơn Hà (red card) 90+2' | Report | Văn Nghĩa 62' |

Vinh Stadium
Attendance: 10,000
Referee: Trần Trung Hiếu

11 March 2012
17:00

| Becamex Bình Dương | 3–1 | The Vissai Ninh Bình |
|---|---|---|
| Tăng Tuấn 31'; Anh Đức 49', 50' | Report | Sanogo 9' |

Gò Đậu Stadium, Thủ Dầu Một
Attendance: 9,000
Referee: Phùng Đình Dũng

==== Match-day 10 ====
16 March 2012
16:10

| Hà Nội | 0–0 | Sông Lam Nghệ An |
|---|---|---|
| | Report |

Hàng Đẫy Stadium, Hà Nội
Attendance: 6,000
Referee: Võ Quang Vinh

16 March 2012
18:30

| Navibank Sài Gòn | 3–1 | SHB Đà Nẵng |
|---|---|---|
| Khánh Lâm 14'; Fonseca 40'; Duy Khánh 82' | Report |

Thống Nhất Stadium, Hồ Chí Minh City
Attendance: 5,000
Referee: Đào Văn Cường

17 March 2012
16:10

| Vicem Hải Phòng | 0–1 | Becamex Bình Dương |
|---|---|---|
| | Report | Anh Đức 6' |

Lạch Tray Stadium, Hải Phòng
Attendance: 11,000
Referee: Phùng Đình Dũng

17 March 2012
16:00

| Kienlongbank Kiên Giang | 0–0 | Thanh Hóa |
|---|---|---|
| Oseni (red card) 90+4' | Report |

Rạch Giá Stadium
Attendance: 6,000
Referee: Hoàng Phạm Công Khánh

17 March 2012
18:30

| Khatoco Khánh Hòa | 1–1 | Hà Nội T&T |
|---|---|---|
| Filho 38' | Report | Marronkle 70' |

Nha Trang Stadium
Attendance: 9,000
Referee: Bùi Thành Thanh Nghĩa

18 March 2012
16:00

| The Vissai Ninh Bình | 2–0 | Sài Gòn |
|---|---|---|
| Văn Thành 57'; Tiến Thành 81'; Danh Ngọc (yellow card) 78' (yellow-red card) 87' | Report | Đình Luật (yellow card) 29' (yellow-red card) 75' |

Ninh Bình Stadium
Attendance: 7,000
Referee: Ngô Quốc Hưng

18 March 2012
16:10

| TĐCS Đồng Tháp | 0–0 | Hoàng Anh Gia Lai |
|---|---|---|
| | Report |

Cao Lãnh Stadium
Attendance: 10,000
Referee: Nguyễn Văn Kiên

==== Match-day 11 ====
24 March 2012
16:00

| Hoàng Anh Gia Lai | 0–0 | Hà Nội T&T |
|---|---|---|
| | Report | Quốc Long (red card) 77' |

Pleiku Stadium
Attendance: 7,500
Referee: Ngô Quốc Hưng

24 March 2012
16:10

| Kienlongbank Kiên Giang | 1–0 | Vicem Hải Phòng |
|---|---|---|
| Hoài Nam 70'; Hoài Nam (yellow card) 71' (yellow-red card) 90+2' | Report |

Rạch Giá Stadium
Attendance: 6,000
Referee: Vũ Bảo Linh

24 March 2012
18:30

| Khatoco Khánh Hòa | 0–1 | Thanh Hóa |
|---|---|---|
| | Report | Văn Thắng 50' |

Nha Trang Stadium
Attendance: 10,000
Referee: Nguyễn Văn Đông

25 March 2012
16:00

| TĐCS Đồng Tháp | 3–3 | SHB Đà Nẵng |
|---|---|---|
| Hải Anh 33'; Ajala 57' (pen.), 59' | Report | Merlo 44', 78'; Klechkaroski 87'; Quốc Anh (red card) 14' |

Cao Lãnh Stadium
Attendance: 6,000
Referee: Hoàng Phạm Công Khánh

25 March 2012
18:30

| Sài Gòn | 0–1 | Becamex Bình Dương |
|---|---|---|
| | Report | Tăng Tuấn 8' |

Thống Nhất Stadium, Hồ Chí Minh City
Attendance: 10,000
Referee: Trần Trung Hiếu

26 March 2012
16:10

| Hà Nội | 1–1 | Navibank Sài Gòn |
|---|---|---|
| Ezeocha 84' | Report | Quang Hướng 60' |

Hàng Đẫy Stadium, Hà Nội
Attendance: 2,500
Referee: Võ Quang Vinh

26 March 2012
16:10

| The Vissai Ninh Bình | 0–2 | Sông Lam Nghệ An |
|---|---|---|
| | Report | Bebbe 9'; Hector 55' |

Ninh Bình Stadium
Attendance: 5,000
Referee: Phùng Đình Dũng

==== Match-day 12 ====
30 March 2012
17:00

| Sông Lam Nghệ An | 3–1 | Khatoco Khánh Hòa |
|---|---|---|
| Dieng 21' (pen.); Trọng Hoàng 47', 75'; Văn Bình (red card) 84' | Report | Ngọc Điểu 58' |

Vinh Stadium
Attendance: 9,000
Referee: Nguyễn Văn Kiên

30 March 2012
18:30

| Navibank Sài Gòn | 3–1 | Kienlongbank Kiên Giang |
|---|---|---|
| Fonseca 55'; Quang Hải 85'; Tài Em 90' | Report | Abraham 30' |

Thống Nhất Stadium, Hồ Chí Minh City
Attendance: 3,500
Referee: Đào Văn Cường

31 March 2012
16:10

| Vicem Hải Phòng | 1–1 | Hà Nội |
|---|---|---|
| Đình Tùng 54' | Report | Xuân Phú 14' (o.g.) |

Lạch Tray Stadium, Hải Phòng
Attendance: 12,000
Referee: Bùi Thành Thanh Nghĩa

31 March 2012
16:00

| SHB Đà Nẵng | 3–0 | The Vissai Ninh Bình |
|---|---|---|
| Merlo 34', 90'; Nguyên Sa 79' | Report |

Chi Lăng Stadium, Đà Nẵng
Attendance: 12,000
Referee: Đinh Văn Dũng

1 April 2012
16:10

| Thanh Hóa | 4–0 | TĐCS Đồng Tháp |
|---|---|---|
| Lemessa 10'; Quốc Phương 60'; Việt Thắng 62'; Văn Thắng 67' | Report |

Thanh Hóa Stadium
Attendance: 10,000
Referee: Võ Quang Vinh

1 April 2012
16:00

| Hà Nội T&T | 1–0 | Sài Gòn |
|---|---|---|
| Văn Quyết 5' | Report |

Hàng Đẫy Stadium, Hà Nội
Attendance: 6,000
Referee: Nguyễn Trọng Thư

1 April 2012
17:00

| Becamex Bình Dương | 1–2 | Hoàng Anh Gia Lai |
|---|---|---|
| Helio 35' (pen.) | Report | Filho 12'; Aganun 45+3' |

Gò Đậu Stadium, Thủ Dầu Một
Attendance: 2,000
Referee: Nguyễn Quốc Hùng

==== Match-day 13 ====
7 April 2012
16:00

| Hoàng Anh Gia Lai | 2–0 | Thanh Hóa |
|---|---|---|
| Thanh Tấn 4'; Văn Long 61' | Report |

Pleiku Stadium
Attendance: 8,000
Referee: Vũ Bảo Linh

7 April 2012
16:10

| TĐCS Đồng Tháp | 1–3 | Kienlongbank Kiên Giang |
|---|---|---|
| Hải Anh 57'; Bửu Ngọc (red card) 86' | Report | Viết Đàn 20'; Hoài Nam 23'; Oseni 90+6' |

Cao Lãnh Stadium
Attendance: 6,000
Referee: Trần Trung Hiếu

8 April 2012
16:00

| The Vissai Ninh Bình | 2–3 | Hà Nội |
|---|---|---|
| Sanogo 13', 16' | Report | Thành Lương 74'; Mboussi 80'; Công Vinh 90' |

Ninh Bình Stadium
Attendance: 5,000
Referee: Võ Quang Vinh

8 April 2012
16:10

| SHB Đà Nẵng | 2–1 | Vicem Hải Phòng |
|---|---|---|
| Merlo 11'; Thanh Hưng 42' (pen.) | Report | Kavin 8' |

Chi Lăng Stadium, Đà Nẵng
Attendance: 15,000
Referee: Phùng Đình Dũng

8 April 2012
17:00

| Becamex Bình Dương | 0–2 | Khatoco Khánh Hòa |
|---|---|---|
| | Report | Ngọc Điểu 16'; Adejala 90+4' |

Gò Đậu Stadium, Thủ Dầu Một
Attendance: 9,000
Referee: Nguyễn Văn Đông

19 April 2012
16:10

| Hà Nội T&T | 3–1 | Navibank Sài Gòn |
|---|---|---|
| Kayode 56', 80'; Marronkle 73' | Report | Fonseca 29' |

Hàng Đẫy Stadium, Hà Nội
Attendance: 1,500
Referee: Đào Văn Cường

19 April 2012
17:00

| Sài Gòn | 2–2 | Sông Lam Nghệ An |
|---|---|---|
| Trọng Phú 31'; Đặng Văn Robert 36' | Report | Bebbe 15'; Dickson 90+3' |

Thống Nhất Stadium, Hồ Chí Minh City
Attendance: 15,000
Referee: Phùng Đình Dũng

==== Match-day 14 ====
14 April 2012
16:10

| Kienlongbank Kiên Giang | 1–1 | Hà Nội T&T |
|---|---|---|
| Duy An 37' | Report | Marronkle 15' |

Rạch Giá Stadium
Attendance: 6,000
Referee: Võ Quang Vinh

14 April 2012
17:00

| Navibank Sài Gòn | 0–0 | Hoàng Anh Gia Lai |
|---|---|---|
| | Report |

Thống Nhất Stadium, Hồ Chí Minh City
Attendance: 4,000
Referee: Nguyễn Trọng Thư

14 April 2012
18:30

| Hà Nội | 4–1 | Becamex Bình Dương |
|---|---|---|
| Danny val Bakel 41' (o.g.); Anjembe 54', 90+2'; Công Vinh 88' | Report | Chí Công 57' |

Hàng Đẫy Stadium, Hà Nội
Attendance: 4,000
Referee: Nguyễn Văn Kiên

15 April 2012
16:00

| Thanh Hóa | 1–0 | The Vissai Ninh Bình |
|---|---|---|
| Sunday 55' | Report | Moussa Sanogo (yellow card) 28' (yellow-red card) 45' |

Thanh Hóa Stadium
Attendance: 11,000
Referee: Kiều Việt Hùng

15 April 2012
16:10

| Khatoco Khánh Hòa | 1–0 | TĐCS Đồng Tháp |
|---|---|---|
| Agostinho Petronil 82' (pen.) | Report |

Nha Trang Stadium
Attendance: 6,000
Referee: Nguyễn Đức Vũ

15 April 2012
17:00

| Vicem Hải Phòng | 2–3 | Sài Gòn |
|---|---|---|
| Edmund 7'; Fagan 57' | Report | Alves 26', 87'; Oloya 38' |

Lạch Tray Stadium, Hải Phòng
Attendance: 11,000
Referee: Vũ Bảo Linh

9 July 2012
18:30

| Sông Lam Nghệ An | 0–4 | SHB Đà Nẵng |
|---|---|---|
| | Report | Quốc Anh 10'; Hernández 31', 45'; Timár 59' |

Vinh Stadium
Attendance: 11,000
Referee: Bùi Thành Thanh Nghĩa

==== Match-day 15 ====
28 April 2012
16:10

| Khatoco Khánh Hòa | 1–2 | SHB Đà Nẵng |
|---|---|---|
| Văn Hạnh (red card) 81'; Adejala 90+5' | Report | Merlo 53'; Timár (yellow card) 57' (yellow-red card) 61'; Minh Phương 87' (pen.) |

Nha Trang Stadium
Attendance: 6,000
Referee: Phùng Đình Dũng

28 April 2012
16:10

| Hà Nội T&T | 3–1 | Hà Nội |
|---|---|---|
| Kayode 45+1'; Văn Quyết 62'; Marronkle 69' | Report | Công Vinh 11' |

Hàng Đẫy Stadium, Hà Nội
Attendance: 6,500
Referee: Võ Quang Vinh

29 April 2012
16:00

| TĐCS Đồng Tháp | 4–1 | The Vissai Ninh Bình |
|---|---|---|
| Felix 16', 48', 86'; Hoàng Max 46' | Report | Danh Ngọc 56' |

Cao Lãnh Stadium
Attendance: 14,000
Referee: Võ Minh Trí

29 April 2012
16:10

| Kienlongbank Kiên Giang | 1–0 | Becamex Bình Dương |
|---|---|---|
| Oseni 85' | Report |

Rạch Giá Stadium
Attendance: 6,000
Referee: Nguyễn Trọng Thư

29 April 2012
17:00

| Vicem Hải Phòng | 2–0 | Hoàng Anh Gia Lai |
|---|---|---|
| Thanh Phúc 3'; Đình Tùng 90+3' | Report |

Lạch Tray Stadium, Hải Phòng
Attendance: 8,000
Referee: Hoàng Anh Tuấn

30 April 2012
17:00

| Thanh Hóa | 2–0 | Sông Lam Nghệ An |
|---|---|---|
| Việt Thắng 16'; Bật Hiếu 39' | Report |

Thanh Hóa Stadium
Attendance: 13,000
Referee: Đào Văn Cường

30 April 2012
19:00

| Sài Gòn Xuân Thành | 1–1 | Navibank Sài Gòn |
|---|---|---|
| Minh Chuyên 54' | Report | Ekpe 72' |

Thống Nhất Stadium, Hồ Chí Minh City
Attendance: 6,000
Referee: Nguyễn Đức Vũ

==== Match-day 16 ====
4 May 2012
17:00

| Navibank Sài Gòn | 2–2 | Vicem Hải Phòng |
|---|---|---|
| Plaza 36', 40' | Report | Fagan 26', 47' |

Thống Nhất Stadium, Hồ Chí Minh City
Attendance: 3,000
Referee: Võ Quang Vinh

4 May 2012
17:00

| Sông Lam Nghệ An | 0–0 | TĐCS Đồng Tháp |
|---|---|---|
| | Report |

Vinh Stadium
Attendance: 5,000
Referee: Nguyễn Văn Đông

5 May 2012
16:00

| Hà Nội | 1–3 | Kienlongbank Kiên Giang |
|---|---|---|
| Anjembe 90+3' (pen.) | Report | Viết Đàn 47'; Minh Trung 75', 88' |

Hàng Đẫy Stadium, Hà Nội
Attendance: 3,000
Referee: Trần Trung Hiếu

5 May 2012
17:00

| The Vissai Ninh Bình | 3–1 | Khatoco Khánh Hòa |
|---|---|---|
| Danh Ngọc 50', 53'; Dourado 57' | Report | Adejala Adewale 78' |

Ninh Bình Stadium
Attendance: 3,000
Referee: Nguyễn Văn Kiên

5 May 2012
17:00

| Becamex Bình Dương | 1–3 | Hà Nội T&T |
|---|---|---|
| Hữu Thắng 23' | Report | Roland 47'; Sỹ Cường 53'; Văn Quyết 61' |

Gò Đậu Stadium, Thủ Dầu Một
Attendance: 10,000
Referee: Ngô Quốc Hưng

6 May 2012
16:00

| Hoàng Anh Gia Lai | 0–3 | Sài Gòn Xuân Thành |
|---|---|---|
| | Report | Nsi 21'; Alves 82'; Rogerio 88' |

Pleiku Stadium
Attendance: 8,000
Referee: Kiều Việt Hùng

6 May 2012
17:00

| SHB Đà Nẵng | 1–0 | Thanh Hóa |
|---|---|---|
| Thanh Hưng 90+4' | Report |

Chi Lăng Stadium, Đà Nẵng
Attendance: 10,000
Referee: Vũ Bảo Linh

==== Match-day 17 ====
12 May 2012
16:00

| Hoàng Anh Gia Lai | 2–0 | SHB Đà Nẵng |
|---|---|---|
| Evaldo 33', 84' | Report |

Pleiku Stadium
Attendance: 7,000
Referee: Đinh Hải Dương

12 May 2012
16:10

| Khatoco Khánh Hòa | 1–2 | Hà Nội |
|---|---|---|
| Adejala Adewale 64' | Report | Ezeocha 70'; Đình Hưng 73' |

Nha Trang Stadium
Attendance: 4,000
Referee: Đinh Văn Dũng

12 May 2012
17:00

| Becamex Bình Dương | 4–1 | Thanh Hóa |
|---|---|---|
| Tăng Tuấn 21'; Kpennosen 42', 72'; Philani 46' | Report | Văn Thắng 24' |

Gò Đậu Stadium, Thủ Dầu Một
Attendance: 15,000
Referee: Bùi Thành Thanh Nghĩa

13 May 2012
16:00

| TĐCS Đồng Tháp | 3–0 | Vicem Hải Phòng |
|---|---|---|
| Hoàng Max 22'; Hải Anh 45'; Felix 77' (pen.) | Report | Tiến Thành (red card) 74'; Ngọc Tân (red card) 75' |

Cao Lãnh Stadium
Attendance: 15,000
Referee: Võ Minh Trí

13 May 2012
18:30

| Sài Gòn Xuân Thành | 1–0 | Kienlongbank Kiên Giang |
|---|---|---|
| Nsi 66' | Report |

Thống Nhất Stadium, Hồ Chí Minh City
Attendance: 4,000
Referee: Hoàng Anh Tuấn

14 May 2012
17:00

| Hà Nội T&T | 2–6 | Sông Lam Nghệ An |
|---|---|---|
| Marronkle 18'; Kayode 29'; Sỹ Cường (yellow card) 44' (yellow-red card) 68' | Report | Trọng Hoàng 5' (pen.), 73'; Abass 11', 70'; Hồng Việt 49'; Dickson 84' |

Hàng Đẫy Stadium, Hà Nội
Attendance: 8,000
Referee: Nguyễn Đức Vũ

14 May 2012
17:00

| The Vissai Ninh Bình | 1–2 | Navibank Sài Gòn |
|---|---|---|
| Hoàng Vissai 82' | Report | Aniekan 29'; Được Em 62' |

Ninh Bình Stadium
Attendance: 4,000
Referee: Nguyễn Trọng Thư

==== Match-day 18 ====
19 May 2012
16:00

| Navibank Sài Gòn | 2–0 | Hà Nội T&T |
|---|---|---|
| Được Em 15'; Ekpe 30' | Report |

Thống Nhất Stadium, Hồ Chí Minh City
Attendance: 6,000
Referee: Võ Quang Vinh

19 May 2012
16:10

| Khatoco Khánh Hòa | 1–1 | Becamex Bình Dương |
|---|---|---|
| Ngọc Điểu 81' | Report | Kpennosen 60' |

Nha Trang Stadium
Attendance: 4,000
Referee: Ngô Quốc Hưng

19 May 2012
17:00

| Sông Lam Nghệ An | 1–1 | Sài Gòn Xuân Thành |
|---|---|---|
| Dieng 15' | Report | Amougou 34' |

Vinh Stadium
Attendance: 10,000
Referee: Trần Trung Hiếu

20 May 2012
16:00

| Hà Nội | 1–2 | The Vissai Ninh Bình |
|---|---|---|
| Anjembe 25' | Report | Sanogo 11'; Mạnh Dũng 55' |

Hàng Đẫy Stadium, Hà Nội
Attendance: 4,000
Referee: Nguyễn Phi Long

20 May 2012
16:10

| Kienlongbank Kiên Giang | 0–2 | TĐCS Đồng Tháp |
|---|---|---|
| | Report | Minh Lợi 50'; Hải Anh 70' |

Rạch Giá Stadium
Attendance: 6,000
Referee: Hoàng Anh Tuấn

20 May 2012
17:00

| Thanh Hóa | 2–1 | Hoàng Anh Gia Lai |
|---|---|---|
| Quốc Phương 32'; Sunday 69' | Report | Hữu Long 87' |

Thanh Hóa Stadium
Attendance: 11,000
Referee: Hoàng Phạm Công Khánh

20 May 2012
17:00

| Vicem Hải Phòng | 2–3 | SHB Đà Nẵng |
|---|---|---|
| Ansah 32'; Đức Thắng 64' | Report | Merlo 29', 53', 72' |

Lạch Tray Stadium, Hải Phòng
Attendance: 10,000
Referee: Vũ Bảo Linh

==== Match-day 19 ====
26 May 2012
16:00

| Thanh Hóa | 2–4 | Hà Nội T&T |
|---|---|---|
| Emmanuel 10'; Quốc Phương 58' (pen.); Lemessa (red card) 45+2' | Report | Kayode 18', 85'; Ngọc Duy 30' (pen.); Bảo Khánh 60'; Roland (yellow card) 45+2' (yellow-red card) 90+3' |

Thanh Hóa Stadium
Attendance: 6,000
Referee: Đinh Văn Dũng

26 May 2012
16:10

| Vicem Hải Phòng | 0–3 | The Vissai Ninh Bình |
|---|---|---|
| Văn Ngân (yellow card) 58' (yellow-red card) 90' | Report | Tiến Thành 36'; Sanogo 49', 89' |

Lạch Tray Stadium, Hải Phòng
Attendance: 6,000
Referee: Bùi Thành Thanh Nghĩa

27 May 2012
16:00

| Hà Nội | 3–2 | Hoàng Anh Gia Lai |
|---|---|---|
| Công Vinh 8'; Đình Hưng 76'; Anjembe 90+5' (pen.) | Report | Aganun 22'; Hữu Long 40+2' |

Hàng Đẫy Stadium, Hà Nội
Attendance: 4,000
Referee: Nguyễn Văn Kiên

27 May 2012
16:10

| Kienlongbank Kiên Giang | 1–0 | Khatoco Khánh Hòa |
|---|---|---|
| Văn Cường 82' | Report | Thanh Tuấn (yellow card) 12' (yellow-red card) 90' |

Rạch Giá Stadium
Attendance: 5,000
Referee: Nguyễn Văn Đông

27 May 2012
17:00

| SHB Đà Nẵng | 2–1 | Sài Gòn Xuân Thành |
|---|---|---|
| Timár 17'; Klechkaroski 90+1' | Report | Alves 34' (pen.) |

Chi Lăng Stadium, Đà Nẵng
Attendance: 20,000
Referee: Đào Văn Cường

27 May 2012
17:00

| Navibank Sài Gòn | 0–0 | TĐCS Đồng Tháp |
|---|---|---|
| Ekpe (red card) 86' | Report |

Thống Nhất Stadium, Hồ Chí Minh City
Attendance: 5,000
Referee: Võ Quang Vinh

27 May 2012
18:30

| Sông Lam Nghệ An | 1–1 | Becamex Bình Dương |
|---|---|---|
| Trọng Hoàng 74' | Report | van Bakel 23'; Huỳnh Phú (yellow card) 8' (yellow-red card) 14' |

Vinh Stadium
Attendance: 7,000
Referee: Nguyễn Trọng Thư

==== Match-day 20 ====
2 June 2012
16:00

| Khatoco Khánh Hòa | 1–0 | Vicem Hải Phòng |
|---|---|---|
| Filho 82' | Report |

Nha Trang Stadium
Attendance: 5,000
Referee: Nguyễn Đức Vũ

2 June 2012
17:00

| Hà Nội T&T | 2–1 | SHB Đà Nẵng |
|---|---|---|
| Văn Quyết 64'; Kayode 90+3' | Report | Thanh Hưng 90+4' (pen.) |

Hàng Đẫy Stadium, Hà Nội
Attendance: 6,000
Referee: Vũ Bảo Linh

3 June 2012
16:00

| The Vissai Ninh Bình | 4–1 | Kienlongbank Kiên Giang |
|---|---|---|
| John 13'; Danh Ngọc 30'; Vissai 60'; Tiến Thành 90' | Report | Hendricks 56' |

Cao Lãnh Stadium
Attendance: 5,000
Referee: Võ Quang Vinh

3 June 2012
16:10

| TĐCS Đồng Tháp | 2–2 | Hà Nội |
|---|---|---|
| Hải Anh 51', 70' | Report | Sỹ Mạnh 69'; Ezeocha 90+2' |

Ninh Bình Stadium
Attendance: 20,000
Referee: Trần Trung Hiếu

3 June 2012
16:10

| Hoàng Anh Gia Lai | 2–2 | Sông Lam Nghệ An |
|---|---|---|
| Aganun 75'; Marcelo 90+2' | Report | Nwakaeme 46', 67'; Sơn Hà (yellow card) 64' (yellow-red card) 90+4' |

Pleiku Stadium
Attendance: 10,000
Referee: Hoàng Phạm Công Khánh

3 June 2012
17:00

| Becamex Bình Dương | 1–1 | Navibank Sài Gòn |
|---|---|---|
| Tăng Tuấn 46' | Report | Quang Hải 4' (pen.) |

Gò Đậu Stadium, Thủ Dầu Một
Attendance: 15,000
Referee: Đinh Hải Dương

3 June 2012
18:30

| Sài Gòn Xuân Thành | 0–0 | Thanh Hóa |
|---|---|---|
| | Report |

Thống Nhất Stadium, Hồ Chí Minh City
Attendance: 8,000
Referee: Phùng Đình Dũng

==== Match-day 21 ====
14 July 2012
17:00

| Sài Gòn Xuân Thành | 2–1 | Khatoco Khánh Hòa |
|---|---|---|
| Oloya 18'; Amougou 26' | Report | Andrade 44'; Filho (yellow card) 22' (yellow-red card) 49' |

Thống Nhất Stadium, Hồ Chí Minh City
Attendance: 5,000
Referee: Phùng Đình Dũng

14 July 2012
17:00

| SHB Đà Nẵng | 2–0 | Hà Nội |
|---|---|---|
| Hernández 37'; Quốc Anh 40' | Report |

Chi Lăng Stadium, Đà Nẵng
Attendance: 15,000
Referee: Đào Văn Cường

14 July 2012
16:00

| Hà Nội T&T | 2–3 | The Vissai Ninh Bình |
|---|---|---|
| Kayode 76'; Văn Quyết 80' | Report | Gustavo 13', 48'; Sanogo 81'; Tiến Thành (yellow card) 45' (yellow-red card) 61' |

Hàng Đẫy Stadium, Hà Nội
Attendance: 1,000
Referee: Võ Minh Trí

15 July 2012
16:10

| Hoàng Anh Gia Lai | 3–0 | Kienlongbank Kiên Giang |
|---|---|---|
| Aganun 64'; Hoàng Thiên 73'; Cardosc 88' | Report |

Pleiku Stadium
Attendance: 7,000
Referee: Võ Quang Vinh

15 July 2012
16:00

| Sông Lam Nghệ An | 5–2 | Vicem Hải Phòng |
|---|---|---|
| Trọng Hoàng 17'; Hector 25', 78'; Bebbe 58'; Dieng 71' | Report | Đình Tùng 74'; Văn Tuyến 86' |

Vinh Stadium
Attendance: 2,500
Referee: Nguyễn Trọng Thư

15 July 2012
17:00

| Thanh Hóa | 2–0 | Navibank Sài Gòn |
|---|---|---|
| Quốc Phương 56'; Văn Thắng 74'; Đức Tuấn (red card) 66' | Report |

Thanh Hóa Stadium
Attendance: 7,000
Referee: Trần Trung Hiếu

15 July 2012
17:00

| Becamex Bình Dương | 1–0 | TĐCS Đồng Tháp |
|---|---|---|
| Chí Công 49' | Report |

Gò Đậu Stadium, Thủ Dầu Một
Attendance: 14,000
Referee: Vũ Bảo Linh

==== Match-day 22 ====
21 July 2012
16:00

| TĐCS Đồng Tháp | 0–4 | Sài Gòn Xuân Thành |
|---|---|---|
| | Report | Alves 7', 85'; Amougou 21', 82' |

Cao Lãnh Stadium
Attendance: 13,000
Referee: Nguyễn Đức Vũ

21 July 2012
17:00

| The Vissai Ninh Bình | 2–1 | Hoàng Anh Gia Lai |
|---|---|---|
| Văn Duyệt 3'; Dourado 78' | Report | Xuân Hiếu 70' |

Ninh Bình Stadium
Attendance: 6,000
Referee: Ngô Quốc Hưng

21 July 2012
16:00

| Vicem Hải Phòng | 0–2 | Hà Nội T&T |
|---|---|---|
| | Report | Kayode 51'; Marronkle 90' |

Lạch Tray Stadium, Hải Phòng
Attendance: 2,000
Referee: Bùi Thành Thanh Nghĩa

22 July 2012
16:10

| Kienlongbank Kiên Giang | 0–3 | Sông Lam Nghệ An |
|---|---|---|
| | Report | Hoàng Thịnh 7'; Văn Bình 27'; Nwakaeme 89' |

Rạch Giá Stadium
Attendance: 5,000
Referee: Phùng Đình Dũng

22 July 2012
16:00

| Navibank Sài Gòn | 1–0 | Khatoco Khánh Hòa |
|---|---|---|
| Tài Em 83' | Report |

Thống Nhất Stadium, Hồ Chí Minh City
Attendance: 3,000
Referee: Nguyễn Văn Kiên

22 July 2012
17:00

| Hà Nội | 3–1 | Thanh Hóa |
|---|---|---|
| Anjembe 36', 59'; Công Vinh 90+1' | Report | Hora 11' |

Hàng Đẫy Stadium, Hà Nội
Attendance: 5,000
Referee: Phùng Đình Dũng

22 July 2012
17:00

| SHB Đà Nẵng | 1–0 | Becamex Bình Dương |
|---|---|---|
| Hernández 86' | Report |

Chi Lăng Stadium, Đà Nẵng
Attendance: 16,000
Referee: Vũ Bảo Linh

==== Match-day 23 ====
28 July 2012
16:10

| Khatoco Khánh Hòa | 3–0 | Hoàng Anh Gia Lai |
|---|---|---|
| Tấn Tài 55'; Ngọc Tùng 75'; Văn Tân 76' | Report |

Nha Trang Stadium
Attendance: 3,000
Referee: Võ Minh Trí

28 July 2012
16:00

| Vicem Hải Phòng | 2–0 | Thanh Hóa |
|---|---|---|
| Ansah 2' (pen.); Bryan 57' | Report |

Lạch Tray Stadium, Hải Phòng
Attendance: 4,000
Referee: Hoàng Anh Tuấn

28 July 2012
18:30

| Navibank Sài Gòn | 1–1 | Sông Lam Nghệ An |
|---|---|---|
| Tài Em 42' | Report | Trọng Hoàng 8' |

Thống Nhất Stadium, Hồ Chí Minh City
Attendance: 7,000
Referee: Nguyễn Đức Vũ

29 July 2012
16:10

| Kienlongbank Kiên Giang | 2–1 | SHB Đà Nẵng |
|---|---|---|
| Oseni 13'; Rudolph 22' | Report | Nguyên Sa 67' |

Rạch Giá Stadium
Attendance: 5,000
Referee: Trần Trung Hiếu

29 July 2012
16:10

| TĐCS Đồng Tháp | 1–3 | Hà Nội T&T |
|---|---|---|
| Hodges 57' | Report | Văn Quyết 22'; Văn Biển 62'; Kayode 90+3' |

Cao Lãnh Stadium
Attendance: 17,000
Referee: Vũ Bảo Linh

29 July 2012
16:00

| The Vissai Ninh Bình | 1–2 | Becamex Bình Dương |
|---|---|---|
| Sanogo 5' | Report | Chí Công 45+2'; Philani 66' |

Ninh Bình Stadium
Attendance: 3,000
Referee: Võ Quang Vinh

29 July 2012
18:30

| Hà Nội | 0–1 | Sài Gòn Xuân Thành |
|---|---|---|
| | Report | Amougou 45+2' |

Hàng Đẫy Stadium, Hà Nội
Attendance: 2,000
Referee: Nguyễn Văn Kiên

==== Match-day 24 ====
4 August 2012
16:00

| Hoàng Anh Gia Lai | 1–0 | TĐCS Đồng Tháp |
|---|---|---|
| Thanh Hiền 53' (o.g.) | Report |

Pleiku Stadium
Attendance: 1,000
Referee: Bùi Thành Thanh Nghĩa

4 August 2012
18:00

| Thanh Hóa | 2–1 | Kienlongbank Kiên Giang |
|---|---|---|
| Lemessa 79'; Thế Dương 84' | Report | Rudolph 19' |

Thanh Hóa Stadium
Attendance: 6,000
Referee: Võ Minh Trí

4 August 2012
17:00

| Becamex Bình Dương | 5–3 | Vicem Hải Phòng |
|---|---|---|
| Vũ Phong 15', 28', 40', 69'; Samson 50' | Report | Ansah 12' (pen.); Bryan 45', 52' |

Gò Đậu Stadium, Thủ Dầu Một
Attendance: 7,000
Referee: Phùng Đình Dũng

5 August 2012
17:00

| SHB Đà Nẵng | 0–0 | Navibank Sài Gòn |
|---|---|---|
| | Report |

Chi Lăng Stadium, Đà Nẵng
Attendance: 15,000
Referee: Ngô Quốc Hưng

5 August 2012
16:00

| Sài Gòn Xuân Thành | 4–1 | The Vissai Ninh Bình |
|---|---|---|
| Amougou 60', 89'; Rodrigues 63', 78' | Report | Danh Ngọc 77' |

Thống Nhất Stadium, Hồ Chí Minh City
Attendance: 3,500
Referee: Nguyễn Đức Vũ

5 August 2012
17:00

| Sông Lam Nghệ An | 2–0 | Hà Nội |
|---|---|---|
| Nwakaeme 81', 83' | Report |

Vinh Stadium
Attendance: 2,000
Referee: Nguyễn Trọng Thư

5 August 2012
18:00

| Hà Nội T&T | 1–1 | Khatoco Khánh Hòa |
|---|---|---|
| Marronkle 5' | Report | Andrade 42' |

Hàng Đẫy Stadium, Hà Nội
Attendance: 7,000
Referee: Trần Trung Hiếu

==== Match-day 25 ====
12 August 2012
16:10

| Sông Lam Nghệ An | 5–3 | The Vissai Ninh Bình |
|---|---|---|
| Nwakaeme 45+1', 70', 85'; Dieng 77'; Hồng Việt 90+1'; Hồng Việt (yellow card) 74' (yellow-red card) 90' | Report | Danh Ngọc 18'; Gustavo 54'; John 83'; Gustavo (red card) 69' |

Vinh Stadium
Attendance: 5,000
Referee: Phùng Đình Dũng

12 August 2012
16:10

| Navibank Sài Gòn | 4–1 | Hà Nội |
|---|---|---|
| Tài Em 12'; Plaza 38', 90+1' (pen.); Ekpe 90+4' | Report | Công Vinh 88' |

Thống Nhất Stadium, Hồ Chí Minh City
Attendance: 5,000
Referee: Ngô Quốc Hưng

12 August 2012
16:10

| Vicem Hải Phòng | 1–3 | Kienlongbank Kiên Giang |
|---|---|---|
| Fagan 59' | Report | Giovanni 7'; Viết Đàn 80'; Oseni 89' |

Lạch Tray Stadium, Hải Phòng
Attendance: 1,000
Referee: Nguyễn Trọng Thư

12 August 2012
16:10

| SHB Đà Nẵng | 0–1 | TĐCS Đồng Tháp |
|---|---|---|
| | Report | Hải Anh 5' |

Chi Lăng Stadium, Đà Nẵng
Attendance: 18,000
Referee: Nguyễn Văn Kiên

12 August 2012
16:10

| Thanh Hóa | 1–2 | Khatoco Khánh Hòa |
|---|---|---|
| Ngọc Hùng 27' | Report | Lemessa 37'; Tấn Tài 58' |

Thanh Hóa Stadium
Attendance: 5,000
Referee: Võ Minh Trí

12 August 2012
16:10

| Hà Nội T&T | 1–3 | Hoàng Anh Gia Lai |
|---|---|---|
| Văn Quyết 90+1' | Report | Evaldo 30'; Aganun 65', 90+4' |

Hàng Đẫy Stadium, Hà Nội
Attendance: 5,000
Referee: Võ Quang Vinh

12 August 2012
16:10

| Becamex Bình Dương | 1–1 | Sài Gòn Xuân Thành |
|---|---|---|
| Tăng Tuấn 31' | Report | Carlos 48' |

Gò Đậu Stadium, Thủ Dầu Một
Attendance: 14,000
Referee: Nguyễn Đức Vũ

==== Match-day 26 ====
19 August 2012
16:10

| Hoàng Anh Gia Lai | 2–0 | Becamex Bình Dương |
|---|---|---|
| Aganun 65'; Evaldo 79' | Report | Chí Công (red card) 67' |

Pleiku Stadium
Attendance: 6,000
Referee: Đinh Hải Dương

19 August 2012
16:10

| TĐCS Đồng Tháp | 3–2 | Thanh Hóa |
|---|---|---|
| Ajala 60' (pen.); Xuân Anh 63' (o.g.); Ngọc Hùng 64' | Report | Emmanuel 32' (pen.), 51'; Anh Tuấn (yellow card) 9' (yellow-red card) 58'; Mensah (yellow card) 53' (yellow-red card) 70' |

Cao Lãnh Stadium
Attendance: 14,000
Referee: Võ Minh Trí

19 August 2012
16:10

| The Vissai Ninh Bình | 1–3 | SHB Đà Nẵng |
|---|---|---|
| Sanogo 87' | Report | Hoàng Quảng 26'; Quốc Anh 52', 60' |

Ninh Bình Stadium
Attendance: 5,000
Referee: Vũ Bảo Linh

19 August 2012
16:10

| Khatoco Khánh Hòa | 2–1 | Sông Lam Nghệ An |
|---|---|---|
| Văn Hoàn 47' (o.g.); Văn Tân 69' | Report | Dieng 59' |

Nha Trang Stadium
Attendance: 11,000
Referee: Hoàng Phạm Công Khánh

19 August 2012
16:10

| Kienlongbank Kiên Giang | 2–0 | Navibank Sài Gòn |
|---|---|---|
| Rudolph 61'; Oseni 70' | Report |

Rạch Giá Stadium
Attendance: 9,000
Referee: Nguyễn Trọng Thư

19 August 2012
16:10

| Hà Nội | 5–0 | Vicem Hải Phòng |
|---|---|---|
| Anjembe 20', 83'; Văn Vinh 36'; Công Vinh 66'; Thành Lương 90+1' | Report |

Hàng Đẫy Stadium, Hà Nội
Attendance: 7,000
Referee: Bùi Thành Thanh Nghĩa

19 August 2012
16:10

| Sài Gòn Xuân Thành | 0–0 | Hà Nội T&T |
|---|---|---|
| | Report | Văn Quyết (yellow card) 16' (yellow-red card) 89' |

Thống Nhất Stadium, Hồ Chí Minh City
Attendance: 25,000
Referee: Nguyễn Văn Kiên

== Top goalscorers ==
The Top Scorers as of 20 August 2012:

| Rank | Name | Team | Goals |
|---|---|---|---|
| 1 | (Nigeria) Timothy Anjembe | Hà Nội | 17 |
| 2 | (Argentina) Gastón Merlo | SHB Đà Nẵng | 16 |
| 3 | (Nigeria) Samson Kayode | Hà Nội T&T | 14 |
| 3 | (Cameroon) Christian Nsi Amougou | Sài Gòn Xuân Thành | 14 |
| 3 | (Brazil) Huỳnh Kesley Alves | Sài Gòn Xuân Thành | 14 |
| 3 | (Nigeria) Felix Gbenga Ajala | TĐCS Đồng Tháp | 14 |
| 7 | (Vietnam) Nguyễn Văn Quyết | Hà Nội T&T | 12 |
| 7 | (Ivory Coast) Moussa Sanogo | The Vissai Ninh Bình | 12 |
| 9 | (Vietnam) Lê Công Vinh | Hà Nội | 11 |
| 9 | (Brazil) Evaldo | Hoàng Anh Gia Lai | 11 |
| 9 | (Nigeria) Ganiyu Bolaji Oseni | Kienlongbank Kiên Giang | 11 |

== Awards ==
=== Monthly awards ===
| Month | Club of the Month | Coach of the Month | | Player of the Month | | Best goal(s) of the Month | |
| Month | Club of the Month | Coach | Club | Player | Club | Player | Club |
|---|---|---|---|---|---|---|---|
| January | Hà Nội T&T | (Vietnam) Lê Huỳnh Đức | SHB Đà Nẵng | (Vietnam) Nguyễn Văn Quyết | Hà Nội T&T | (Vietnam) Nguyễn Quang Hải | Navibank Sài Gòn |
| February | Xuân Thành Sài Gòn | (Vietnam) Lư Đình Tuấn | Xuân Thành Sài Gòn | (Nigeria) Timothy Anjembe | Hà Nội | (Vietnam) Phạm Đăng Duy An | Kiên Long Bank Kiên Giang |
| March | Becamex Bình Dương | (Vietnam) Đặng Trần Chỉnh | Becamex Bình Dương | (Netherlands) Alexander Prent | SHB Đà Nẵng | (Netherlands) Alexander Prent | SHB Đà Nẵng |
| April | Hà Nội T&T | (Vietnam) Phan Thanh Hùng | Hà Nội T&T | (Argentina) Gastón Merlo | SHB Đà Nẵng | (Vietnam) Lê Quốc Phương | FLC Thanh Hóa |
| May | TĐCS Đồng Tháp | (Vietnam) Trần Công Minh | TĐCS Đồng Tháp | (Argentina) Gastón Merlo | SHB Đà Nẵng | (Nigeria) Ezeocha O. Ambrose | Hà Nội |
| July | Xuân Thành Sài Gòn | (Vietnam) Nguyễn Văn Sỹ | Vissai Ninh Bình | (Argentina) Nicolás Hernández | SHB Đà Nẵng | (Vietnam) Bùi Xuân Hiếu | Hoàng Anh Gia Lai |
| August | Xuân Thành Sài Gòn | (Vietnam) Hoàng Anh Tuấn | Khatoco Khánh Hòa | (Nigeria) Timothy Anjembe | Hà Nội | (Vietnam) Nguyễn Vũ Phong | Becamex Bình Dương |

=== Annual awards ===
==== Manager of the Season ====
(Vietnam) Lê Huỳnh Đức (SHB Đà Nẵng)

==== Best player of the Season ====
(Netherlands) Alexander Prent (SHB Đà Nẵng)

==== Best Referee ====
(Vietnam) Võ Quang Vinh
