= 2011 Vietnamese Super Cup =

- Event: Vietnamese Super Cup
Sông Lam Nghệ An	Navibank Sài Gòn
1	1
- Sông Lam Nghệ An won 3–1 on penalties.
- Date: 17 December 2011
- Venue: Vinh Stadium, Vinh, Nghệ An
- Man of the Match: Vincent Bossou (Navibank Saigon)
- Referee: Hoàng Anh Tuấn
- Attendance: 12,000

The 2011 PV Gas Vietnamese Super Cup Final was the 13th edition of the Vietnamese Super Cup. It featured the winners of the 2011 V-League, Sông Lam Nghệ An, and the winners of the 2011 Vietnamese Cup, Navibank Sài Gòn. This edition was sponsored by Petrovietnam Gas (PV Gas) and was known as 2011 PV Gas Vietnamese Super Cup.

Sông Lam Nghệ An featured in 3rd Super Cup and Navibank Sài Gòn played in the fixture for the first time.

The game finished goalless after 90 minutes, and Sông Lam Nghệ An won 3–1 on penalties for their fourth Super Cup victory.

== Match details ==
December 17, 2011
16:15 UTC+7

Sông Lam Nghệ An	1–1	Navibank Sài Gòn
Nguyễn Hồng Việt 53'	Report	Lương Văn Được Em 63'
Penalties
Nguyễn Quang Tình (penalty scored); Gustave Bebbe (penalty missed); Âu Văn Hoàn (penalty scored); Nguyễn Trọng Hoàng (penalty scored)	3–1	(penalty scored) Aniekan Okon Ekpe; (penalty missed) Lương Văn Được Em; (penalty missed) Đoàn Việt Cường; (penalty missed) Lê Quang Long

Vinh Stadium, Vinh, Nghệ An
Attendance: 12,000
Referee: Hoàng Anh Tuấn

GK	1	(Vietnam) Nguyễn Viết Nam
DF	2	(Vietnam) Âu Văn Hoàn	(yellow card) 26'
DF	3	(Vietnam) Nguyễn Huy Hoàng	(yellow card) 38'
DF	24	(Vietnam) Quế Ngọc Mạnh
DF	12	(Vietnam) Lê Hoàng Phát Thierry
MF	7	(Trinidad and Tobago) Hughton Hector
MF	9	(Vietnam) Nguyễn Trọng Hoàng (c)
MF	22	(Vietnam) Hoàng Văn Bình		(substituted off) 75'
FW	11	(Vietnam) Nguyễn Ngọc Anh	(yellow card) 39'	(substituted off) 44'
FW	99	(Cameroon) Gustave Bebbe
FW	23	(Senegal) Abass Cheikh Dieng
Substitutes:
MF	17	(Vietnam) Nguyễn Quang Tình		(substituted in) 75'
MF	21	(Vietnam) Nguyễn Hồng Việt	(yellow card) 52'	(substituted in) 44'
Manager:
(Vietnam) Nguyễn Hữu Thắng

GK	39	(Vietnam) Nguyễn Thế Anh (c)
DF	14	(Vietnam) Nguyễn Anh Tuấn		(substituted off) 59'
DF	15	(Vietnam) Lê Quang Long
DF	16	(Togo) Vincent Bossou	(yellow card) 90+2'
DF	24	(Vietnam) Huỳnh Đức Nghĩa
MF	9	(Vietnam) Đặng Khánh Lâm	(yellow card) 16'
MF	10	(Vietnam) Phan Văn Tài Em
MF	11	(Vietnam) Đoàn Việt Cường
MF	17	(Vietnam) Lương Văn Được Em
MF	20	(Nigeria) Aniekan Ekpe
FW	18	(Vietnam) Nguyễn Văn Nghĩa
Substitutes:
DF	4	(Vietnam) Đoàn Văn Nirut		(substituted in) 59'
Manager:
(Vietnam) Phạm Công Lộc

Man of the Match:
Vincent Bossou (Navibank Sài Gòn)

Assistant referees:
Nguyễn Ngọc Hà
Phạm Mạnh Long
Fourth official:
Ngô Quốc Hưng

Match rules

- 90 minutes (two halves of 45 minutes each).
- Penalty shoot-out if scores still level.
- Seven named substitutes.
- Maximum of three substitutions.

Vietnamese Super Cup
2011 Winners
Sông Lam Nghệ An
Fourth title

== See also ==
- 2011 V-League
- 2011 Vietnamese Cup
