= Phan Thanh Hung =

Phan Thanh Hung may refer to:

- Phan Thanh Hùng (1960–2026), Vietnamese footballer and manager
- Phan Thanh Hưng (born 1987), Vietnamese footballer
