= Đoàn Hùng Sơn =

Vietnamese footballer (born 1986)

Personal information
- Full name: Đoàn Hùng Sơn
- Date of birth: November 30, 1986 (age 39)
- Place of birth: Mù Cang Chải, Yên Bái, Vietnam
- Height: 1.63 m (5 ft 4 in)
- Position: Midfielder

Youth career
- 2007–2011: SHB Đà Nẵng

Senior career*
Years	Team	Apps	(Gls)
2011–2015	SHB Đà Nẵng	72	(5)
2016–2017	Quảng Nam	20	(0)
- * Club domestic league appearances and goals

Đoàn Hùng Sơn (born 30 November 1986) is a Vietnamese footballer who plays as a midfielder for V-League (Vietnam) club SHB Đà Nẵng F.C.

== Honours ==
=== Club ===
SHB Đà Nẵng

- V.League 1: 2009, 2012; runners-up: 2013
- Vietnamese Super Cup: 2012; runners-up: 2009
- Vietnamese Cup: 2009; runners-up: 2013

Quảng Nam

- V.League 1: 2017
