= Đinh Văn Ta =

Brazilian footballer (born 1982)

Personal information
- Full name: Rodrigo Mota Farias
- Date of birth: 6 October 1982 (age 44)
- Place of birth: Brazil
- Position: Midfielder

Senior career*
Years	Team	Apps	(Gls)
2007	Centro Limoeirense de Futebol		
2008	Navibank Sài Gòn FC		
2009–2014	Vissai Ninh Bình FC	58	(12)
2014	Dong A Thanh Hoa	7	(1)
2016	SHB Da Nang	3	(0)
- * Club domestic league appearances and goals

Rodrigo Mota Farias (born 6 October 1982), who also uses the Vietnamese name Đinh Văn Ta, is a Brazilian former footballer who played as a left-footed midfielder. He played for Vietnamese side Vissai Ninh Bình FC, where he was regarded as one of the club's most important players.

He was born and raised in Brazil, where he met his wife. He is a naturalized Vietnamese citizen.
