= Huỳnh Quốc Anh =

Vietnamese footballer (born 1985)

Personal information
- Full name: Huỳnh Quốc Anh
- Date of birth: 10 May 1985 (age 41)
- Place of birth: Bắc Trà My, Quảng Nam, Vietnam
- Height: 1.72 m (5 ft 8 in)
- Position: Left winger

Team information
- Current team: SHB Đà Nẵng B (head coach)

Youth career
- 1998–2004: SHB Đà Nẵng

Senior career*
| Years | Team | Apps | (Gls) |
| 2005–2016 | SHB Đà Nẵng | 260 | (32) |

International career
| 2005–2008 | Vietnam U23 | 24 | (7) |
| 2006–2014 | Vietnam | 16 | (3) |

Managerial career
- 2025: Trường Tươi Binh Phước
- 2026–: SHB Đà Nẵng B
- * Club domestic league appearances and goals

Huỳnh Quốc Anh (born 10 May 1985) is a Vietnamese football manager and former footballer. He is currently the head coach of SHB Đà Nẵng B.

Quốc Anh played as a left winger and spend his entire career playing for SHB Đà Nẵng. He also played for the Vietnam national team. Banned from playing for 3 years between 2005 and 2008 after a match-fixing scandal, Quốc Anh managed to win the Vietnamese Golden Ball in 2012 after leading SHB Đà Nẵng to win the 2012 V-League.

== International career ==
=== International goals ===
Scores and results list Vietnam's goal tally first.

| No | Date | Venue | Opponent | Score | Result | Competition |
|---|---|---|---|---|---|---|
| 1. | 26 October 2012 | Thống Nhất Stadium, Ho Chi Minh City, Vietnam | Laos | 4–0 | 4–0 | Friendly |
| 2. | 6 February 2013 | Mỹ Đình National Stadium, Hanoi, Vietnam | United Arab Emirates | 1–1 | 1–2 | 2015 AFC Asian Cup qualification |
| 3. | 5 March 2014 | Mỹ Đình National Stadium, Hanoi, Vietnam | Hong Kong | 1–0 | 3–1 | 2015 AFC Asian Cup qualification |
