= Đinh Văn Dũng =

Vietnamese football referee (born 1983)

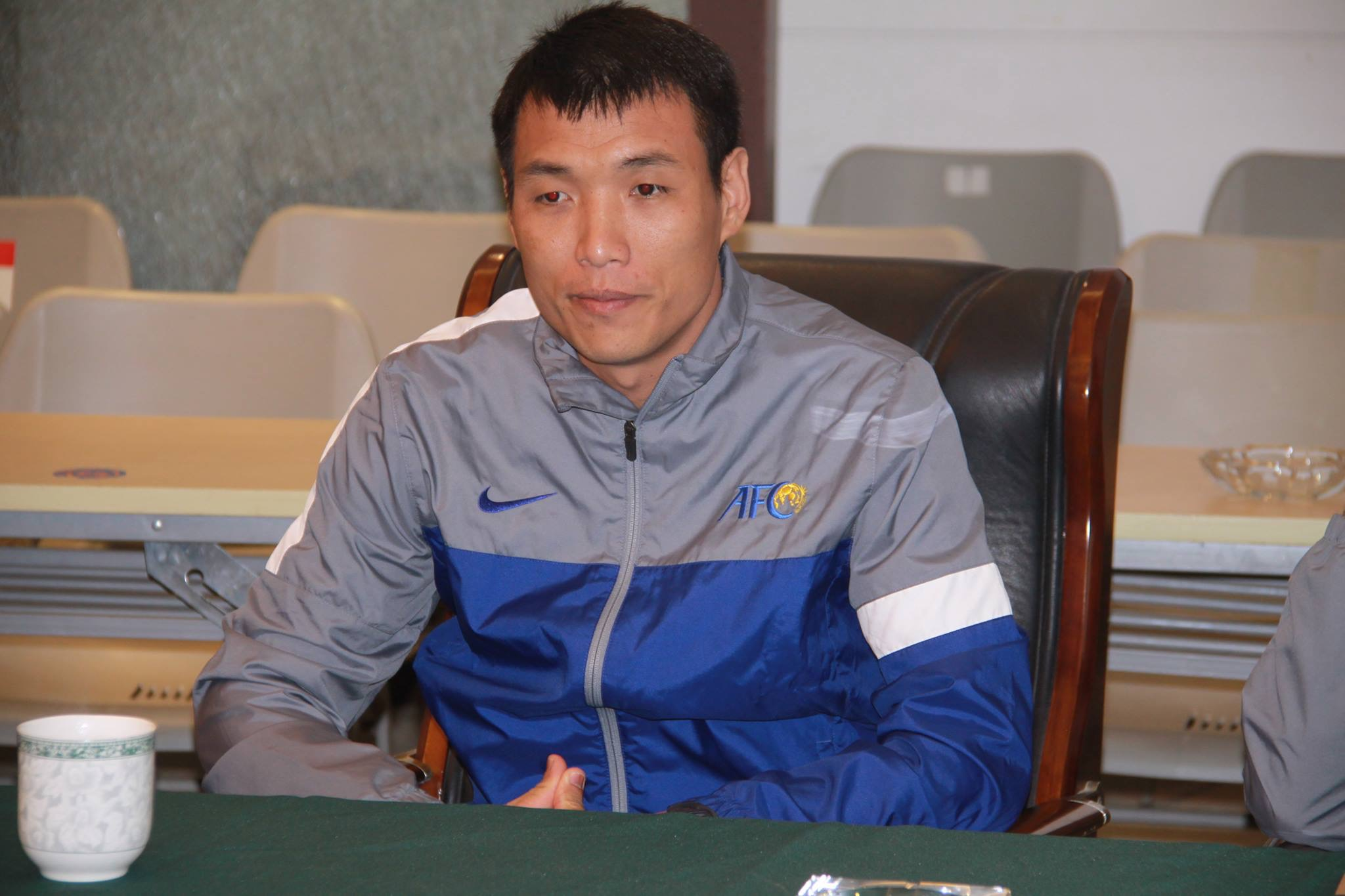
- Đinh Văn Dũng in 2014
- Born: 21 October 1983 (age 43); Giao Thủy district, Nam Định, Vietnam

Domestic
| Years | League | Role |
| 2010–2012 | V.League 2 | Referee |
| 2012–2016 | V.League | Referee |

International
| Years | League | Role |
| 2013–2016 | FIFA | Referee |
| –2016 | AFC | |

Đinh Văn Dũng (born 21 October 1983) is a retired Vietnamese football referee who officiated in V.League 1 and V.League 2. He also made his appearance in the East Asian Games, AFC Cup, AFC Champion League, and World Cup qualification.

== Career ==
Dũng was born on 21 October 1983, he lived in Nam Định before moving to Đồng Nai.

In 2006, Dũng attended Refereeing Class in Hue and began officiating in national U11, U13, U15, and U17 tournaments.

In 2008, Dũng was sent by the Vietnam Football Federation to Malaysia to attend the Project Future Referee Training Course organized by the AFC. In 2010, after graduating, Dũng became a referee for V.League 2. In 2011, the AFC also sent him to train in England Premier League for one week, but he didn't attend due to family problem.

In 2012, Văn Dũng was promoted to officiate the 2012 V-League. In the next year, he became a FIFA referee after being nominated by the VFF.

Before the start of the 2017 V.League 1, Văn Dũng decided to retire after being demoted to work in the First Division.
