= Nguyễn Văn Vinh =

Vietnamese footballer (born 1984)

Personal information
- Full name: Nguyễn Văn Vinh
- Date of birth: 15 December 1984 (age 41)
- Place of birth: Hưng Nguyên, Nghệ An, Vietnam
- Height: 1.68 m (5 ft 6 in)
- Position: Midfielder

Senior career*
| Years | Team | Apps | (Gls) |
| 2002–2007 | Sông Lam Nghệ An | 102 | (23) |
| 2010–2011 | Hòa Phát Hà Nội | 7 | (0) |
| 2012 | Hà Nội | 15 | (1) |
| 2013–2014 | QNK Quảng Nam | 19 | (0) |
| 2015–2017 | Sông Lam Nghệ An | 44 | (3) |

International career
| 2000–2001 | Vietnam U17 | 1 | (0) |
Medal record
Sông Lam Nghệ An
| Winner | Vietnamese Cup | 2017 |
- * Club domestic league appearances and goals as of 11:08, 18 July 2018 (UTC)

Nguyễn Văn Vinh (born 15 December 1984) is a Vietnamese footballer who plays as a midfielder.

== Club career ==
Nguyễn played for Sông Lam Nghệ An between 2002 and 2007, having already represented Vietnam at the 2000 AFC U-17 Championship. He returned to SLNA in 2015, and began studying for his coaching qualifications.

== Career statistics ==
=== Club ===
As of 18 July 2018.

| Club | Season | League | | | Cup | | Continental | | Other | | Total | |
| Club | Season | Division | Apps | Goals | Apps | Goals | Apps | Goals | Apps | Goals | Apps | Goals |
|---|---|---|---|---|---|---|---|---|---|---|---|---|
| Hòa Phát Hà Nội | 2011 | V-League | 7 | 0 | 0 | 0 | – | | 0 | 0 | 7 | 0 |
| Hà Nội | 2012 | V-League | 15 | 1 | 0 | 0 | – | | 0 | 0 | 15 | 1 |
| QNK Quảng Nam | 2014 | V.League 1 | 19 | 0 | 0 | 0 | – | | 0 | 0 | 19 | 0 |
| Sông Lam Nghệ An | 2015 | V.League 1 | 8 | 0 | 0 | 0 | – | | 0 | 0 | 8 | 0 |
| Sông Lam Nghệ An | 2016 | V.League 1 | 15 | 2 | 0 | 0 | – | | 0 | 0 | 15 | 2 |
| Sông Lam Nghệ An | 2017 | V.League 1 | 21 | 1 | 0 | 0 | – | | 0 | 0 | 21 | 1 |
| Sông Lam Nghệ An | Total | | 44 | 3 | 0 | 0 | 0 | | 0 | 0 | 44 | 3 |
| Career total | | | 85 | 4 | 0 | 0 | 0 | | 0 | 0 | 85 | 4 |
