= Phạm Nguyên Sa =

Vietnamese footballer

Personal information
- Full name: Phạm Nguyên Sa
- Date of birth: January 17, 1989 (age 37)
- Place of birth: Đà Nẵng, Vietnam
- Height: 1.72 m (5 ft 8 in)
- Position: Defensive midfielder

Team information
- Current team: SHB Đà Nẵng
- Number: 43

Youth career
- 2001–2008: SHB Đà Nẵng

Senior career*
Years	Team	Apps	(Gls)
2009–2016	SHB Đà Nẵng	102	(4)
2017–2021	Than Quảng Ninh	78	(5)
2022–	SHB Đà Nẵng	13	(2)

International career^{‡}
2012–2013	Vietnam	7	(0)
- * Club domestic league appearances and goals as of 14 March 2021 ‡ National team caps and goals as of 6 February 2013

Phạm Nguyên Sa (born 17 January 1989) is a Vietnamese professional footballer who plays as a defensive midfielder for V.League 1 club SHB Đà Nẵng.

Nguyên Sa was born in Da Nang and started his career at SHB Da Nang. He then signed for Than Quang Ninh in October 2016. He made his international debut in 2012 and represented his country at 2012 AFF Championship.

== Club career ==
=== Than Quang Ninh ===
Following the 2016 season, Nguyên Sa was released by SHB Da Nang. He signed a 3-year deal with Than Quảng Ninh prior to the start of the 2017 season. He made his debut on 26 February 2017, playing the full 90 minutes as Than Quang Ninh beat Saigon 3–0 at Cẩm Phả Stadium.

== Honours ==
=== Clubs ===
SHB Da Nang

- V.League 1: 2012
- Vietnamese Cup runner-up: 2013

Than Quang Ninh

- Vietnamese Super Cup: 2016
