= Ricardinho (footballer, born 1988) =

Brazilian footballer

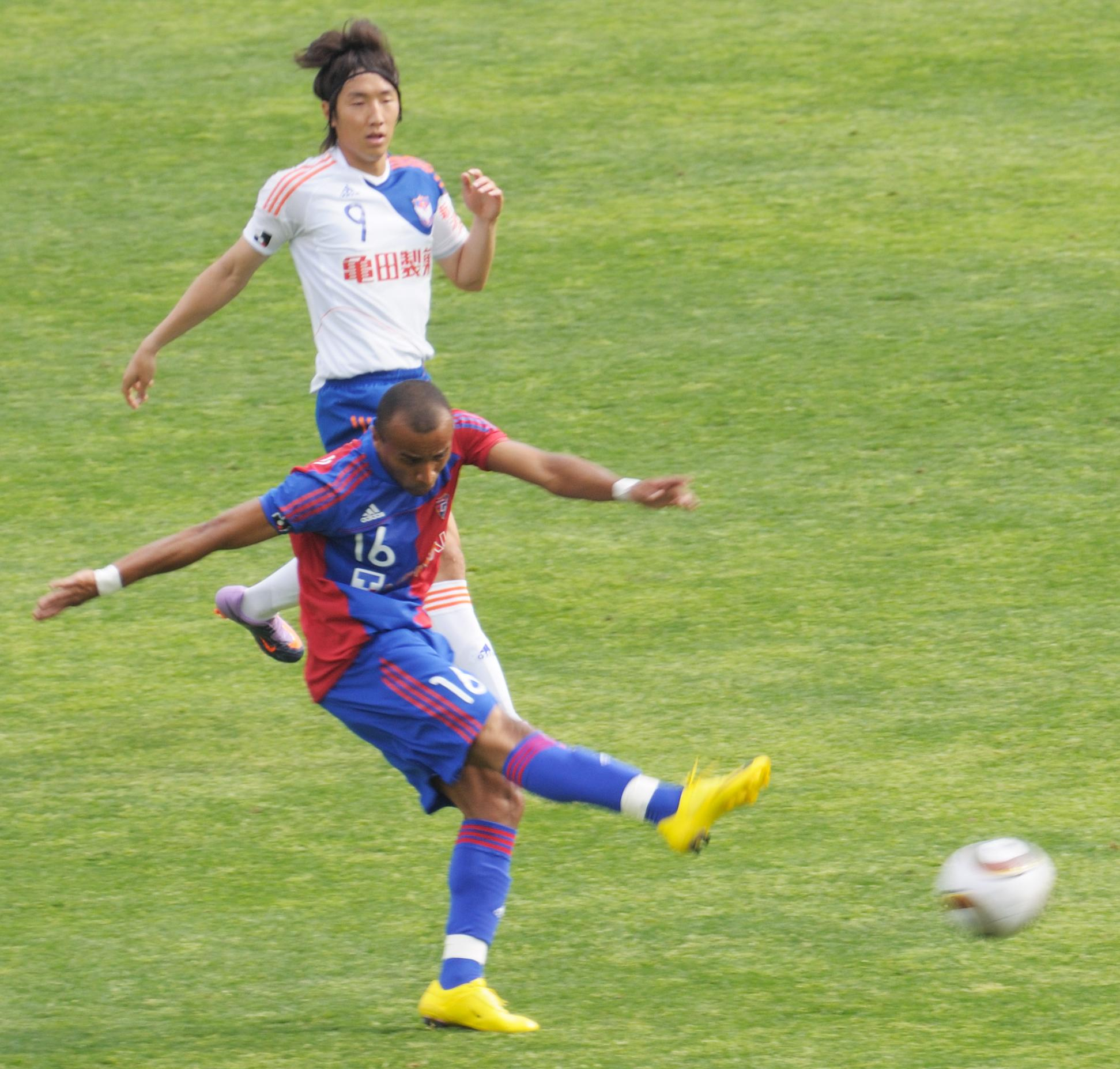
- Ricardinho taking a shot

Personal information
- Full name: Ricardo Alves Pereira
- Date of birth: August 8, 1988 (age 38)
- Place of birth: Sinop, Brazil
- Height: 1.78 m (5 ft 10 in)
- Position: Striker

Youth career
- 2001–2003: PSTC-PR

Senior career*
Years	Team	Apps	(Gls)
2005–2013	Atlético Paranaense	35	(3)
2007–2008	→ FC Dallas (loan)	15	(0)
2009	→ ABC (loan)	20	(4)
2010	→ FC Tokyo (loan)	29	(1)
2011	→ Ponte Preta (loan)	45	(3)
2013	→ Figueirense (loan)	34	(5)
2014	América Mineiro	25	(1)
2015	Daejeon Citizen	7	(0)
2015	CRB	11	(0)
2016	Linense	11	(1)
2016–2017	Lobos BUAP	19	(2)
2017	Londrina	3	(1)
2018	Uberlândia	8	(0)
2019	Taubaté	11	(1)
2019–2021	Ben Guerdane	11	(3)
2020	→ Al-Ansar (loan)		
2021	Concórdia	2	(0)
- * Club domestic league appearances and goals

Ricardo Alves Pereira (born August 8, 1988, in Sinop, Mato Grosso), or simply Ricardinho, is a Brazilian footballer.

== Club career ==
He made his professional debut with Clube Atlético Paranaense in a 4–2 home victory against São Paulo on August 20, 2005, in the Campeonato Brasileiro. On 24 July 2007 FC Dallas announced that Ricardinho has signed for them on loan on 5 June 2007. He made his debut for Dallas against Mexican Primera División side UANL Tigres on 7 July.

== International career ==
Ricardinho has played for Brazil at Under 16, Under 17, Under 18 and Under 20 level.

== Contract ==
- Atlético-PR 1 June 2007 to 31 May 2012

== Career statistics ==
As of match played on 11 April 2021

Appearances and goals by club, season and competition
Club	Season	League			State League		Cup		League Cup		Continental		Other		Total	
Club	Season	Division	Apps	Goals	Apps	Goals	Apps	Goals	Apps	Goals	Apps	Goals	Apps	Goals	Apps	Goals
Atlético Paranaense	2005	Série A	3	0	—		—		—		—		—		3	0
Atlético Paranaense	2007	Série A	0	0	—		3	0	—		—		—		3	0
Atlético Paranaense	2012	Série B	14	0	15	3	3	0	—		—		—		32	3
Atlético Paranaense	2013	Série A	—		3	0	—		—		—		—		3	0
Atlético Paranaense	Total		17	0	18	3	6	0	—		—		—		41	3
FC Dallas (loan)	2007	MLS	8	0	—		0	0	—		—		0	0	8	0
FC Dallas (loan)	2008	MLS	7	0	—		0	0	—		—		3	0	10	0
FC Dallas (loan)	Total		15	0	—		0	0	—		—		3	0	18	0
ABC (loan)	2009	Série B	20	4	—		1	0	—		—		—		21	4
FC Tokyo (loan)	2010	J.League Division 1	29	1	—		5	0	5	1	—		—		39	2
Ponte Preta (loan)	2011	Série B	35	3	10	0	—		—		—		—		45	3
Figueirense (loan)	2013	Série B	24	3	10	2	5	1	—		—		—		39	6
América Mineiro	2014	Série B	18	1	7	0	2	0	—		—		—		27	1
Daejeon Citizen	2015	K League Classic	7	0	—		1	0	—		—		—		8	0
CRB	2015	Série B	11	0	—		—		—		—		—		11	0
Linense	2016	Campeonato Paulista	—		11	1	1	0	—		—		—		12	1
Lobos BUAP	2016–17	Ascenso MX	19	2	—		2	0	—		—		—		21	2
Londrina	2017	Série B	3	1	—		—		—		—		—		3	1
Uberlândia	2018	Campeonato Mineiro	—		8	0	1	1	—		—		—		9	1
Taubaté	2019	Campeonato Paulista Série A2	—		11	1	—		—		—		—		11	1
Ben Guerdane	2019–20	Tunisian Ligue Professionnelle 1	11	3	—		0	0	—		2	2	—		13	5
Al-Ansar (loan)	2019–20	Saudi First Division			—				—		—		—			
Concórdia	2021	Campeonato Catarinense	—		2	0	—		—		—		—		2	0
Career total			209	18	77	7	24	2	5	1	2	2	3	0	320	30
