= Trần Đức Dương =

Vietnamese footballer

Personal information
- Full name: Trần Đức Dương
- Date of birth: May 2, 1983 (age 43)
- Place of birth: Nghĩa Hưng, Nam Định, Vietnam
- Height: 1.72 m (5 ft 8 in)
- Position: Midfielder

Youth career
- 1994–2001: Nam Định

Senior career*
Years	Team	Apps	(Gls)
2002–2011	Nam Định	107	(7)
2011–2012	Vicem Hải Phòng	25	(3)
2012–2014	Hoàng Anh Gia Lai	14	(3)
2014–2016	Hải Phòng	23	(2)

International career
2007–2008	Vietnam	8	(1)
- * Club domestic league appearances and goals

Trần Đức Dương (born May 2, 1983 in Vietnam) is a Vietnamese footballer who is a midfielder for Hải Phòng.

Dương was known for his role in Nam Định FC.
