= Lê Quốc Phương =

Vietnamese footballer (born 1991)

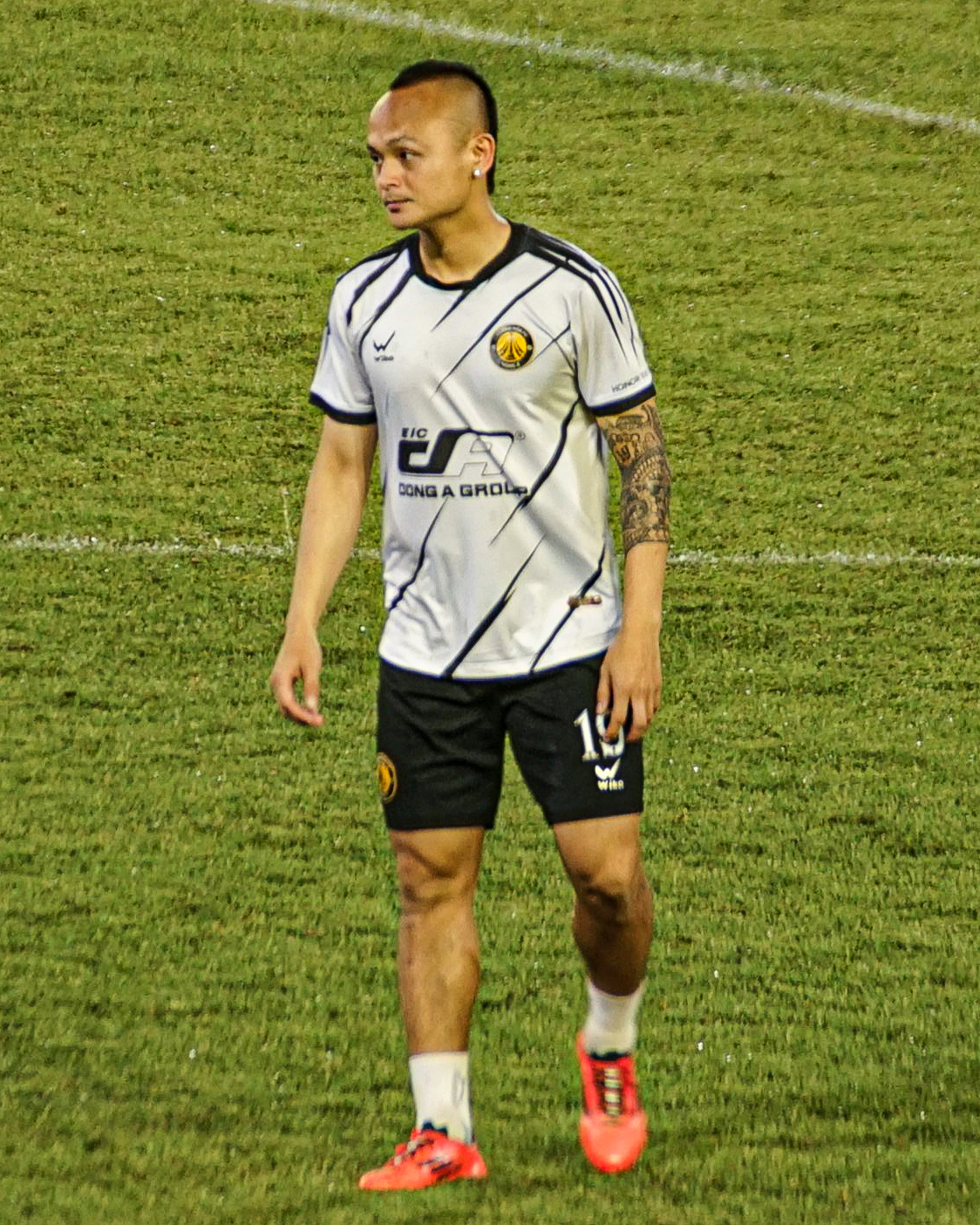
- Lê Quốc Phương in 2026

Personal information
- Full name: Lê Quốc Phương
- Date of birth: May 19, 1991 (age 35)
- Place of birth: Hoằng Hóa, Thanh Hóa, Vietnam
- Height: 1.65 m (5 ft 5 in)
- Position: Winger

Youth career
- 2004–2011: Thanh Hóa

Senior career*
Years	Team	Apps	(Gls)
2011–2018	FLC Thanh Hóa	136	(25)
2018–2020	Sài Gòn	47	(13)
2021–2026	Đông Á Thanh Hóa	66	(3)
Total		249	(41)

International career
2009–2011	Vietnam U19	5	(2)
2011–2014	Vietnam U22	4	(1)
- * Club domestic league appearances and goals as of 26 September 2025

Lê Quốc Phương (born 19 May 1991) is a former Vietnamese professional footballer who last played for V.League 1 club Đông Á Thanh Hóa.

At the end of the 2025–26 season, Quốc Phương announced his retirement.

== International career ==
=== International goals ===
==== Under-19 ====
#	Date	Venue	Opponent	Score	Result	Competition
1.	4 October 2010	Zibo Sports Center Stadium, Zibo	Jordan	1-1	2-1	2010 AFC U-19 Championship

==== Under-22 ====
#	Date	Venue	Opponent	Score	Result	Competition
1.	28 June 2012	Yangon, Thuwunna Stadium	Philippines	6-0	9-0	2013 AFC U-22 Championship qualification
2.	28 June 2012	Yangon, Thuwunna Stadium	Philippines	9-0	9-0	2013 AFC U-22 Championship qualification

== Honours ==
Đông Á Thanh Hóa

- Vietnamese National Cup: 2023, 2023–24
- Vietnamese Super Cup: 2023
