= Cao Sỹ Cường =

Vietnamese footballer (born 1984)

Personal information
- Full name: Cao Sỹ Cường
- Date of birth: February 19, 1984 (age 42)
- Place of birth: Thọ Xuân, Thanh Hóa, Vietnam
- Height: 1.68 m (5 ft 6 in)
- Position: Midfielder

Youth career
- 2000–2002: Đường sắt Việt Nam
- 2002–2003: Hàng Không Việt Nam
- 2003–2004: Hà Nội ACB

Senior career*
Years	Team	Apps	(Gls)
2004–2007	Hà Nội ACB	15	(0)
2007–2009	Hòa Phát Hà Nội	28	(8)
2009–2014	Hà Nội T&T	45	(2)
2014–2016	Thanh Hóa	23	(1)

International career
2003–2005	Vietnam U23	2	(0)
2004–2013	Vietnam	19	(0)
- * Club domestic league appearances and goals

Cao Sỹ Cường (born 19 February 1984) is a retired Vietnamese footballer who played as a midfielder for V-League club Thanh Hóa and the Vietnamese internationals.
