= Rạch Giá Stadium =

- Interactive map of Rạch Giá Stadium
- Location: Rạch Giá, Vietnam
- Coordinates: 9.9633°N 105.1180°E
- Capacity: 10,000

Tenant
- Kiên Giang F.C.

Rạch Giá Stadium is a multi-use stadium in Rạch Giá, Kiên Giang, Vietnam. It is currently used mostly for football matches and is the home stadium of Kiên Giang F.C. The stadium holds 10,000 people.
