= Timothy Anjembe =

Nigerian footballer

Personal information
- Full name: Timothy Anjembe
- Date of birth: 20 September 1987 (age 39)
- Place of birth: Gboko, Benue State, Nigeria
- Height: 1.78 m (5 ft 10 in)
- Position: Forward

Youth career
- BCC Lions

Senior career*
Years	Team	Apps	(Gls)
2005	Zamfara United		
2005	Lobi Stars	?	(12)
2006–2008	Enyimba		
2009	Vissai Ninh Bình	0	(0)
2009	→ Đồng Tháp (loan)	23	(11)
2010–2011	Hòa Phát Hà Nội	18	(16)
2011–2012	Hà Nội ACB	20	(17)
2013–2014	Vissai Ninh Bình	20	(6)
2014–2015	Hoàng Anh Gia Lai	20	(18)
2015–2016	FLC Thanh Hóa	2	(0)
- * Club domestic league appearances and goals

Timothy Anjembe (born 20 September 1987 in Gboko) is a retired Nigerian footballer who played as a striker.

== Career ==
In 2005, Timothy signed for Lobi Stars, where he became top scorer of the Nigerian Premier League, the top tier of Nigeria, at the age of 18 and was considered one of the hottest prospects in the league. A year later, he joined Enyimba and played at the CAF Champions League.

Timothy then went to Vietnam to join Vissai Ninh Bình in 2009. He was loaned out to Đồng Tháp and scored a hat-trick in his debut against Hoàng Anh Gia Lai. At the end of the season, he was nominated as one of the best foreigners in the league. In 2010, Timothy joined Hòa Phát Hà Nội.

== Individual ==
- Best Goalscorer Nigerian Premier League: 2005
- Best Goalscorer V-League: 2012
