= Trần Chí Công =

Vietnamese footballer

Personal information
- Full name: Trần Chí Công
- Date of birth: 25 April 1983 (age 43)
- Place of birth: Bình Thủy, Cần Thơ, Vietnam
- Height: 1.82 m (6 ft 0 in)
- Position: Defender

Youth career
- 2000–2002: Cần Thơ

Senior career*
Years	Team	Apps	(Gls)
2003–2008	Cần Thơ	42	(5)
2009–2014	Becamex Bình Dương	51	(13)
2014–2016	Đồng Tâm Long An	60	(9)
2016–2017	XSKT Cần Thơ	23	(1)

International career
2008–2013	Vietnam	7	(0)
- * Club domestic league appearances and goals as of 18 February 2017

Trần Chí Công is a Vietnamese football defender who plays for Vietnamese V-League club Bình Dương F.C. Tran Chi Cong was once called up to Vietnam national football team in 2008.
