= Olumuyiwa Aganun =

Nigerian footballer (born 1984)

Personal information
- Full name: Olushola Olumuyiwa Aganun
- Date of birth: 4 May 1984 (age 42)
- Place of birth: Lagos, Nigeria
- Height: 1.82 m (6 ft 0 in)
- Position: Striker

Youth career
- –2000: Global Stars
- 2000–2001: Reggiana

Senior career*
Years	Team	Apps	(Gls)
2003–2004	Msida Saint-Joseph	37	(13)
2007–2009	Wacker Innsbruck	97	(17)
2009	SC-ESV Parndorf	16	(5)
2009	Msida Saint-Joseph	4	(1)
2009–2011	Dong Thap	5	(2)
2011	Hòa Phát Hà Nội	20	(4)
2012	Hoang Anh Gia Lai	15	(7)
2016–2017	SC Neusiedl/Zaya	25	(7)
2022–2024	Sans Papiers-Die Bunten	14	(5)
Total		233	(61)
- * Club domestic league appearances and goals

Olushola Olumuyiwa Aganun{(born 4 May 1984) is a Nigerian former professional footballer who played as a forward.

== Career ==
In 2001, Aganun was scouted to Reggiana together with Obafemi and Oladipupo Martins. However, unlike the Martins brothers Aganun returned to Nigeria. He later moved to Malta and Msida Saint-Joseph, then Austria and Wacker Innsbruck. He joined SC-ESV Parndorf in 2009. He played a trial game with Darlington in August 2009 against Bradford Park Avenue. In September 2009 he returned to Malta where he signed again for Msida Saint-Joseph. In 2011, he plays for Hòa Phát Hà Nội of the V.League 1.

In April 2012 he played for Hoang Anh Gia Lai of the V.League 1.

In 2016, he returned to lower tier football in Austria, joining SC Neusiedl/Zaya. Ahead of the 2022–23 season, Aganun played for seventh tier 1. Klasse club Sans Papiers-Die Bunten from Vienna.
