= Mai Tiến Thành =

Vietnamese footballer

Personal information
- Full name: Mai Tiến Thành
- Date of birth: 16 March 1986 (age 40)
- Place of birth: Ngọc Lặc, Thanh Hóa, Vietnam
- Height: 1.72 m (5 ft 8 in)
- Position: Winger

Youth career
- 1997–2002: Thanh Hóa

Senior career*
Years	Team	Apps	(Gls)
2003–2008	Thanh Hóa	1	(0)
2009–2013	XM The Vissai Ninh Bình	57	(9)
2013	Thanh Hóa	10	(0)
2014–2015	Becamex Bình Dương	38	(3)
2015–2018	FLC Thanh Hóa	54	(2)

International career^{‡}
2006–2009	Vietnam U23	6	(5)
2006–2015	Vietnam	13	(1)
- * Club domestic league appearances and goals as of 26 May 2018 ‡ National team caps and goals as of 03:38, 14 December 2015 (UTC)

Mai Tiến Thành (born 16 March 1986) is a former Vietnamese footballer who played as a winger, currently the assistant coach of PVF-CAND.

== Club career ==
In 2002, Thành was chosen to train with Leeds United for 2 months.

=== Thanh Hóa ===
Thành signed a 2-year deal with Thanh Hóa in December 2015.

== International career ==
Appearances and goals by national team and year
National team	Year	Apps	Goals
Vietnam	2006	1	0
Vietnam	2007	4	1
Vietnam	2010	1	0
Vietnam	2012	1	0
Vietnam	2013	3	0
Vietnam	2015	3	0
Total		13	1

Scores and results list Vietnam's goal tally first, score column indicates score after each Thành goal.

List of international goals scored by Mai Tiến Thành
No.	Date	Venue	Cap	Opponent	Score	Result	Competition
1	30 June 2007	Mỹ Đình National Stadium, Hanoi, Vietnam	3	Bahrain	3–1	5–3	Friendly
