= Michael Mensah =

Ghanaian footballer

Personal information
- Date of birth: 5 July 1981 (age 45)
- Place of birth: Ghana
- Height: 1.87 m (6 ft 2 in)
- Position: Forward

Senior career*
Years	Team	Apps	(Gls)
2002	Rakuunat		
2003	FC Kuusankoski		
2003	FC Jokerit	13	(0)
2004–2005	Rakuunat		
2006–2008	Trelleborgs FF	68	(18)
2009	Syrianska FC	13	(9)
2011–2012	Thanh Hóa F.C.	23	(5)
- * Club domestic league appearances and goals

Michael Mensah (born 5 July 1981) is a Ghanaian former professional footballer who played as a forward.

== Career ==
Having played for Rakuunat in Finland, Mensah joined Swedish side Trelleborgs FF in 2006. In January 2009, after three years at Trelleborgs FF, he moved to Syrianska FC.

In December 2011, he joined Thanh Hóa F.C. in Vietnamese Super League under the name Andrew.
