= Đặng Khánh Lâm =

Vietnamese footballer (born 1984)

Personal information
- Full name: Đặng Khánh Lâm
- Date of birth: January 23, 1984 (age 42)
- Place of birth: Hải Dương, Vietnam
- Height: 1.75 m (5 ft 9 in)
- Position: Midfielder

Youth career
- 1996–2004: Vicem Hải Phòng

Senior career*
Years	Team	Apps	(Gls)
2005	QK3	9	(0)
2006–2009	Thể Công	42	(8)
2010	FLC Thanh Hóa	3	(0)
2011–2012	Navibank Sài Gòn	28	(3)
2012	Xuân Thành Sài Gòn	1	(0)
2013–2014	FLC Thanh Hóa	16	(0)
2015–2017	Hải Phòng	56	(2)

International career^{‡}
2015–2016	Vietnam	2	(0)
- * Club domestic league appearances and goals as of 30 September 2017 ‡ National team caps and goals as of 24 May 2015

Đặng Khánh Lâm (born 23 January 1984) is a Vietnamese footballer who plays as a midfielder for V-League club Hải Phòng F.C. and the Vietnam national football team.
