= Lại Hồng Vân =

Vietnamese footballer (born 1959)

Personal information
- Place of birth: Vietnam
- Positions: Midfielder; defender

Senior career*
Years	Team	Apps	(Gls)
1983–1996	Dong Thap FC		
- * Club domestic league appearances and goals

Lại Hồng Vân (born 1959) is a Vietnamese football manager.

== Early life ==
He grew up in Minh Hải province, Vietnam.

== Career ==
He played for Vietnamese side Dong Thap FC, helping the club win the league.

== Style of play ==
He operated as a midfielder and defender.

== Personal life ==
He has been married and has two daughters.
