= Lê Xuân Anh =

Vietnamese footballer (born 1991)

Personal information
- Full name: Lê Xuân Anh
- Date of birth: July 26, 1991 (age 35)
- Place of birth: Hậu Lộc, Thanh Hóa, Vietnam
- Height: 1.83 m (6 ft 0 in)
- Position: Defender

Youth career
- 2004–2010: FLC Thanh Hóa

Senior career*
Years	Team	Apps	(Gls)
2011–2014	FLC Thanh Hóa	23	(0)
2014	→ XSKT Cần Thơ (loan)	6	(0)
2015–2018	Hải Phòng	38	(0)
2019–2021	Thanh Hóa	9	(0)
- * Club domestic league appearances and goals as of 22 January 2017

Lê Xuân Anh (born 26 July 1991) is a Vietnamese footballer who plays as a defender for V-League (Vietnam) club Thanh Hóa.
