= Nguyễn Tăng Tuấn =

Vietnamese footballer

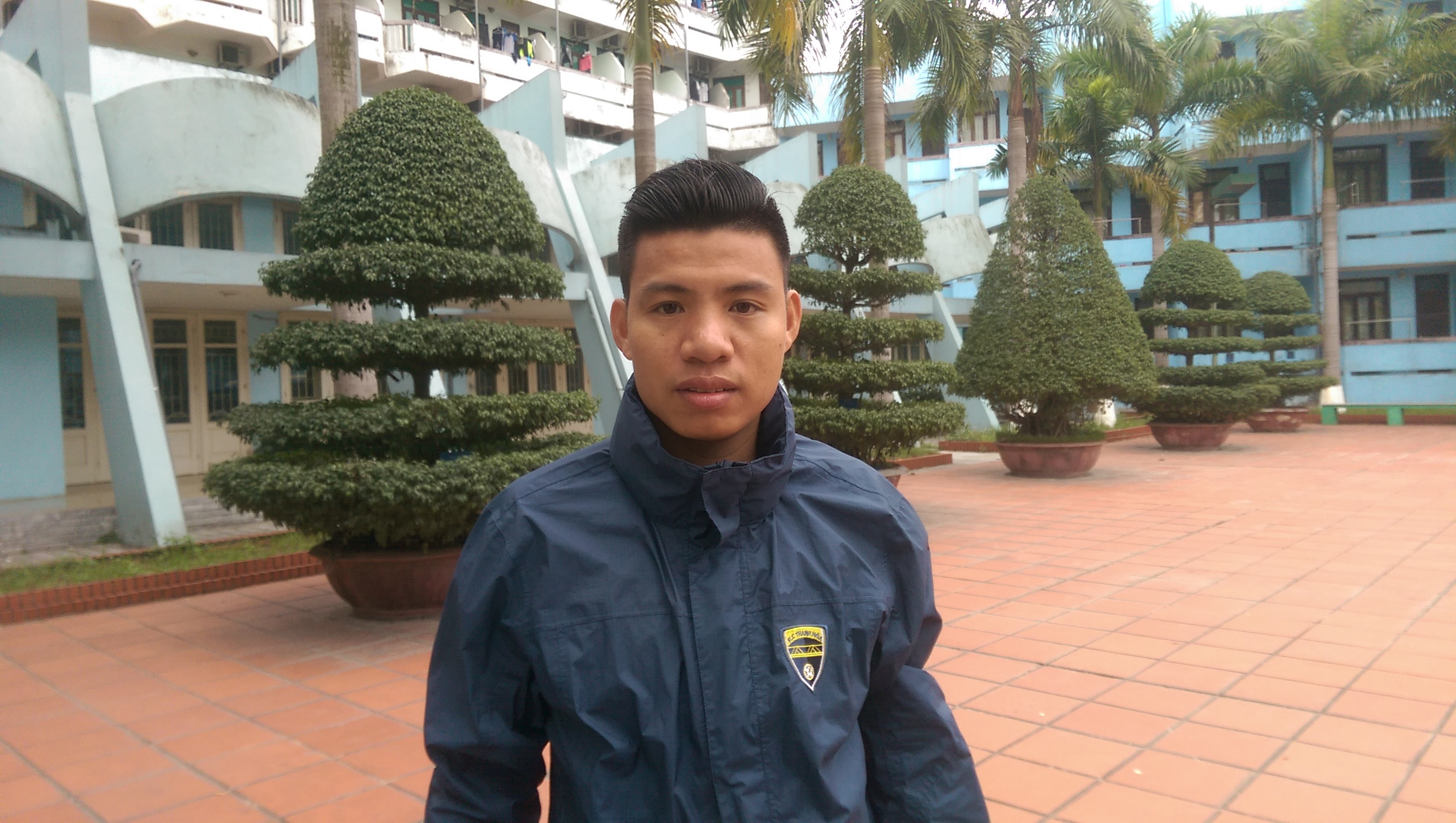

Personal information
- Full name: Nguyễn Tăng Tuấn
- Date of birth: June 28, 1986 (age 40)
- Place of birth: Triệu Sơn, Thanh Hóa, Vietnam
- Height: 1.73 m (5 ft 8 in)
- Position: Forward

Youth career
- 1999–2003: Thanh Hóa (1962)
- 2003–2007: HAGL – Arsenal JMG Academy

Senior career*
Years	Team	Apps	(Gls)
2007–2011	Hoàng Anh Gia Lai	64	(23)
2012–2016	Becamex Bình Dương	88	(22)
2016–2018	FLC Thanh Hóa	11	(0)
2018–2020	XSKT Cần Thơ	17	(1)
- * Club domestic league appearances and goals as of 14 July 2018

Nguyễn Tăng Tuấn (born 28 June 1986) is a Vietnamese footballer who plays as a forward for XSKT Cần Thơ.
