= Trương Huỳnh Phú =

Vietnamese footballer

Personal information
- Full name: Trương Huỳnh Phú
- Date of birth: 25 August 1988 (age 38)
- Place of birth: Sơn Tây, Quảng Ngãi, Vietnam
- Height: 1.75 m (5 ft 9 in)
- Position: Defender

Youth career
- 2003–2012: Đồng Tâm Long An

Senior career*
Years	Team	Apps	(Gls)
2011	Đồng Tâm Long An	17	(0)
2012–2014	Becamex Bình Dương	32	(0)
2015	Đồng Nai	9	(0)
2016–2019	Becamex Bình Dương	32	(0)
2019–2021	Bình Phước	15	(0)

International career
2011–2013	Vietnam U23	3	(0)
- * Club domestic league appearances and goals as of 22 June 2018

Trương Huỳnh Phú (born 25 August 1988) is a Vietnamese footballer who plays as a defender for V.League 2 club Bình Phước.

== Club career ==
=== Return to Becamex Binh Duong ===
Huỳnh Phú signed a 2-year deal with his former club Becamex Binh Duong in November 2015.
