= Sunday Chibuike =

Nigerian footballer

Personal information
- Full name: Sunday Chibuike Ibeji
- Date of birth: 2 July 1982 (age 44)
- Place of birth: Kafanchan, Nigeria
- Height: 1.73 m (5 ft 8 in)
- Position: Midfielder

Senior career*
| Years | Team | Apps | (Gls) |
| 1999–2000 | Lobi Stars | | |
| 2000–2003 | Al Ahly | | |
| 2003–2004 | VCU Rams | | |
| 2004–2005 | NK Ljubljana | 15 | (3) |
| 2005–2006 | NK Celje | 36 | (3) |
| 2007 | NK Domžale | 10 | (1) |
| 2007–2009 | FC Koper | 32 | (4) |
| 2009 | → Bela Krajina (loan) | 5 | (0) |
| 2010–2013 | Đồng Tháp | | |

International career^{‡}
| 2000 | Nigeria | 1 | (0) |
- * Club domestic league appearances and goals as of 31 January 2013 ‡ National team caps and goals as of 28 April 2011

Sunday Chibuike Ikeji (born 2 July 1982) is a former Nigerian footballer who played as a midfielder.

== Career ==
He began his career at Lobi Stars F.C., before moving to Al Ahly in 2000 and became famous for scoring a goal against Real Madrid on 4 August 2001. In January 2004, he signed a contract for NK Ljubljana in Slovenia. He played in Ljubljana for 1 year and then signed for NK MIK CM Celje in 2005, in which he has scored one goal in 12 games. He left Celje in 2006 and joined another Slovenian club, NK Domžale, making 10 appearances and scored 1 goal. He moved to FC Koper in July 2007. He played 30 games and scored 4 goals and was loaned out from his team in January 2009 to NK Bela Krajina Črnomelj. After returning to FC Koper in January 2010, he was sold to Đồng Tháp F.C. in the V-League.

== National team ==
Sunday played one match for the Nigerian national team in 2000.
