= Lương Văn Được Em =

Vietnamese footballer (born 1985)

Personal information
- Full name: Lương Văn Được Em
- Date of birth: September 14, 1985 (age 41)
- Place of birth: Hồng Ngự, Đồng Tháp, Vietnam
- Height: 1.80 m (5 ft 11 in)
- Position: Midfielder

Youth career
- 2001–2004: Đồng Tháp

Senior career*
Years	Team	Apps	(Gls)
2005	Fico Tây Ninh	14	(2)
2006–2010	TĐCS Đồng Tháp	173	(27)
2011–2012	Navibank Sài Gòn	19	(1)
2013–2020	Đồng Tháp	137	(29)

International career
2007–2010	Vietnam	4	(0)
- * Club domestic league appearances and goals

Lương Văn Được Em (born 1985 in Hồng Ngự District, Đồng Tháp Province) is a Vietnamese footballer who plays for the Đồng Tháp. He was called to Vietnam national football team
