= Justice Majabvi =

Zimbabwean footballer (born 1984)

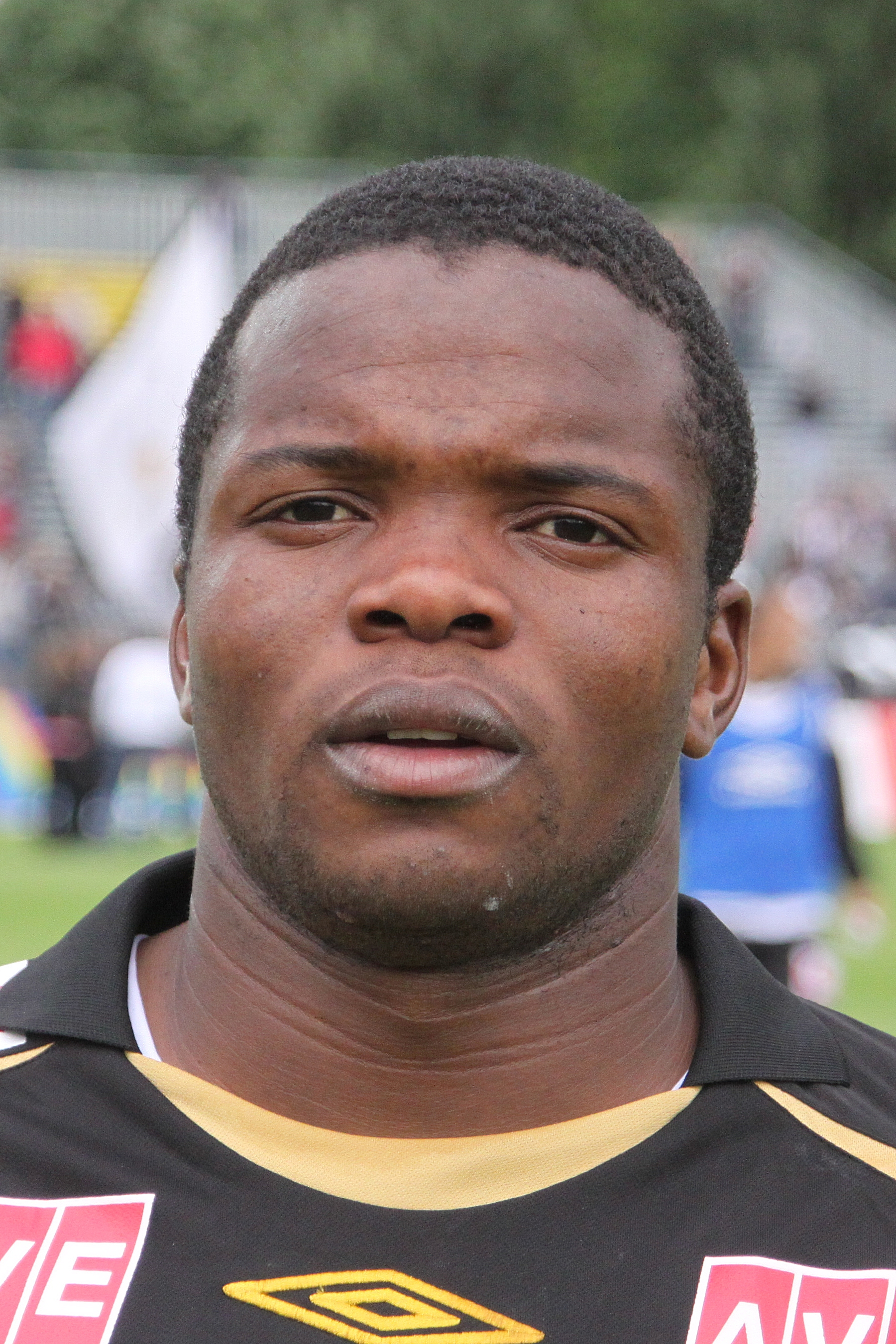

Personal information
- Full name: Justice Majabvi
- Date of birth: 26 March 1984 (age 42)
- Place of birth: Harare, Zimbabwe
- Position: Midfielder

Team information
- Current team: Tanzania Simba Sport Club
- Number: 28

Senior career*
Years	Team	Apps	(Gls)
2002–2005	Lancashire Steel F.C.	98	(11)
2006–2008	Dynamos F.C.	84	(14)
2009–2011	LASK Linz	76	(1)
2011–2012	Khatoco Khánh Hoà	28	(3)
2012–2015	Vicem Hai Phong F.C.	90	(5)
2015–2017	Simba Sports Club	30	(1)

International career^{‡}
2004–2011	Zimbabwe	27	(1)
- * Club domestic league appearances and goals as of 5 January 2018 ‡ National team caps and goals as of 20 June 2017

Justice Majabvi (born 26 March 1984) is a former Zimbabwean football player, who finished his career in 2018 with the Tanzanian Team of Simba SC. Now he works as an agent for the German-based agency WSM Marketing & Management.

The midfielder is also a member of the Zimbabwe national football team and a former Dynamos FC great.

== Club/International career ==
Majabvii earned his first cap for Zimbabwe during a Friendly match against Zambia on 15 July 2004. Also played in the African Champions league in 2008 up to the semi-finals with Dynamos f.c. Made 14 appearances in the African Champions League and 1 goal against Swaziland team in Harare. Majabvi signed for Dynamos FC in 2006 season from Lancashire Steel FC for 3 years. 2007 as Dynamos FC captain, he won the League Championship, CBZ Cup and Nestlé Cup. He was the first captain to win the League Championship since 1997. Three time Zimbabwe Soccer Star of the Year 2nd runner-up (2005 at Lancashire Steel, 2007 at Dynamos FC and 2008 at Dynamos FC. 2008–2009 season Majabvi joined Lask Linz FC of Austria in the Austrian Bundesliga Tipp3 on a three-year contract. Majabvi has played all the games for khatoco khan hoa in the just ended 2011–2012 season. He was outstanding throughout the season. A couple of goals, three goals in 26 league games and no goals in 2 national cup games, nine assists at hand. Majabvi has never missed any competitive match for Khatoco Khan Hoa FC. After he finished his career as a professional football player he joined the German-based players' agency WSM Marketing & Management and works as their agent in Zimbabwe and several countries in Africa.
