= Cao Lãnh Stadium =

Vietnamese football stadium

Coordinates: 10°27′53″N 105°38′33″E

- Interactive map of Cao Lãnh Stadium
- Location: Cao Lãnh, Vietnam
- Owner: Đồng Tháp F.C.
- Capacity: 23.000

The Cao Lãnh Stadium or officially Sân vận động Cao Lãnh is a multi-use stadium in Cao Lãnh, Vietnam. It is currently used mostly for football matches and is the home stadium of Đồng Tháp F.C. of the V-League. The stadium holds 23,000 spectators.
