= Đinh Hoàng La =

Vietnamese footballer

Mykola Lytovka Đinh Hoàng La
Personal information
- Full name: Mykola Oleksandrovych Lytvoka
- Date of birth: 28 October 1979 (age 47)
- Place of birth: Kyiv, Ukrainian SSR, Soviet Union
- Height: 1.93 m (6 ft 4 in)
- Position: Goalkeeper

Senior career*
Years	Team	Apps	(Gls)
1997	FC Avers Bakhmach	1	(0)
1998–2000	FC CSKA Kyiv	0	(0)
1998–2000	→ FC CSKA-2 Kyiv	3	(0)
2000–2001	FC Nyva Vinnytsia	0	(0)
2000	→ FC Podillya Khmelnytskyi (loan)	1	(0)
2001	→ FC Nistru Otaci (loan)	1	(0)
2002	→ Avanhard Rovenky (loan)	13	(0)
2002	→ FC Elektrometalurh-NZF Nikopol (loan)	15	(0)
2003–2004	SC Olkom Melitopol	15	(0)
2005	FC Knyazha Shchaslyve	2	(0)
2005	Hồ Chí Minh City	3	(0)
2005–2008	Thanh Hóa	32	(0)
2009–2011	Vissai Ninh Bình	26	(0)
2012–2013	Becamex Bình Dương	15	(0)

International career
2009	Vietnam	1	(0)
- * Club domestic league appearances and goals

Đinh Hoàng La (née Mykola Oleksandrovych Lytvoka; Russian: Николай Литовка; born 28 October 1979) is a retired footballer. Born in Ukraine, he represented the Vietnam national team.
