= Kiên Giang FC =

Vietnamese football club

- Full name: Câu lạc bộ bóng đá Kiên Giang
- Founded: 1998; 28 years ago
- Ground: Rạch Giá Stadium
- Capacity: 10,000
- Chairman: Nguyễn Anh Tuấn
- Manager: Đào Văn Phong
- League: Unsure
Home colours	Away colours

Kiên Giang Football Club (Vietnamese: Câu lạc bộ bóng đá Kiên Giang) is a Vietnamese football club, based in Rạch Giá, Kiên Giang Province. The club plays its home games at Rạch Giá Stadium.

== History ==
Kienlongbank Kiên Giang were runners-up to Sài Gòn Xuân Thành in the 2011 Vietnamese First Division and are promoted to the Super League for the 2012 season.

In 2013, Kiên Giang withdrew from professional football due to lack of funds, so the team was dissolved.

In the 2017 season, Kiên Giang re-established and returned to the Vietnamese football system, participate in the 2017 National Third League, but the team did not succeed with a losing record. In 2018, Kiên Giang football did not participate in the 3rd division, so it was disbanded again.

In the 2022 season, a new club named Dugong Kiên Giang Club was established by current chairman Nguyen Anh Tuan to attend the 2022 National Third Division. The team consists of young players led by coach Đào Văn Phong, a former player of the Vietnamese national team . On October 31, 2022, Dugong Kiên Giang defeated Kon Tum Football club with a score of 1–0 in the final round of the National Third Division, which promoted them to the 2023 Vietnamese Football League second division, the third tier of professional football in Vietnam.

== Stadium ==
Kiên Giang's home is Rạch Giá Stadium. The stadium has a capacity of 10.000 people.

== Players ==
As of 23 May 2023

Note: Flags indicate national team as defined under FIFA eligibility rules; some limited exceptions apply. Players may hold more than one non-FIFA nationality.

No.	Pos.	Nation	Player
1	GK	VIE	Nguyễn Văn Bá
6	MF	VIE	Nguyễn Minh Chứa
8	MF	VIE	Phan Thanh Nhựt
9	FW	VIE	Cầm Bá Thành
10	MF	VIE	Huỳnh Kim Hùng
11	MF	VIE	Trần Quốc Thiện
13	MF	VIE	Huỳnh Minh Nhật
14	MF	VIE	Hà Minh Đức
15	DF	VIE	Bùi Hoàng Mỹ
16	MF	VIE	Nguyễn Thế Hùng
17	MF	VIE	Nguyễn Văn Dũng

No.	Pos.	Nation	Player
18	MF	VIE	Nguyễn Ngọc Giang
20	MF	VIE	Đặng Như Tứ
25	GK	VIE	Lê Anh Tuấn
70	FW	VIE	Bùi Thế Phong
78	DF	VIE	Phan Bá Hoàng
22	FW	VIE	Lê Văn Cường
23	DF	VIE	Nguyễn Đức Tùng
2	DF	VIE	Trần Minh Phát
19	MF	VIE	Nguyễn Đình Đức
68	FW	VIE	Đỗ Văn Chí
21	MF	VIE	Nguyễn Thành Đạt

== Achievements ==
League

V.League 2:

(silver) Runners-up : 2011

Second League:

(gold) Winners : 2010

Second League:

Winners: 2022
