= Hoàng Danh Ngọc =

Vietnamese footballer (born 1990)

Personal information
- Full name: Hoàng Danh Ngọc
- Date of birth: April 3, 1990 (age 36)
- Place of birth: Thái Thụy, Thái Bình, Vietnam
- Height: 1.65 m (5 ft 5 in)
- Position: Left winger

Youth career
- 2001–2006: Nam Định

Senior career*
Years	Team	Apps	(Gls)
2007–2010	Nam Định	7	(0)
2012–2014	Vissai Ninh Bình	41	(8)
2015–2016	Than Quảng Ninh	18	(3)
2017–2021	Long An	67	(9)

International career
2011–2014	Vietnam U23	3	(0)
- * Club domestic league appearances and goals as of 19 March 2017

Hoàng Danh Ngọc (born 3 April 1990) is a former Vietnamese professional footballer who plays as a left winger. He is the twin brother of Hoàng Nhật Nam.
