= Edmund Owusu-Ansah =

Ghanaian retired footballer (born 1983)

Personal information
- Full name: Edmund Owusu-Ansah
- Date of birth: 2 April 1983 (age 43)
- Place of birth: Kumasi, Ghana
- Height: 1.78 m (5 ft 10 in)
- Position: Midfielder

Youth career
- Feyenoord Rotterdam

Senior career*
Years	Team	Apps	(Gls)
2003–2007	Asante Kotoko	123	(24)
2007–2010	Heart of Lions	65	(28)
2010–2011	Sông Lam Nghệ An	33	(4)
2011–2012	Hải Phòng F.C.	25	(4)
2013–2014	Heart of Lions	26	(6)

International career
1999–2001	Ghana U-20		
2003–2005	Ghana U-23	14	(8)
2007–	Ghana	2	(0)
- * Club domestic league appearances and goals

Edmund Owusu-Ansah (born 2 April 1983 in Kumasi, Ghana) is a Ghanaian retired footballer who plays as a midfielder and former Ghana national football team

== Career ==
Edmund Owusu-Ansah is a Ghanaian-born football player. He is a midfielder who has often been touted as the "midfield general" for his command in midfield. He has the ability to control and influence the game, exert energy in supporting offensive and defensive plays. Edmund Owusu-Ansah began his professional career with Feyenoord, and later joined Asante Kotoko. After four years in the Ghana Premier League for the Porcupine Warriors joined in summer 2007 to League rival Heart of Lions. He joined the V-League side Sông Lam Nghệ An in 2010 and helped them win the league title that year. Vicem Hải Phòng purchased him from Sông Lam Nghệ An in 2011 for the 2011/12 season. He returned to his native country Ghana and re-signed with his former team Heart of Lions in 2013.

Before joining Kumasi Asante Kotoko, Edmund played for the Feyenoord Rotterdam youth team, Holland. Since turning professional he has trained with Dynamo Kiev (Ukraine), Udinese (Italy), Krylia Sovetov (Russia) and FC Lyn Oslo (Norway).

Edmund signed with Arizona United SC for the 2015 season.

== International career ==
Edmund begun his international career through the Ghana Black Satellites (National under 20 team), and carried on through to the Black Meteors (National under 23 team).

He was a member of the Ghana national football team who earned his first cap in 2007. He captained the national team to play a friendly against Argentina in 2009 under their then coach Diego Maradona. He also led the local select side of the Ghana national team at the CHAN tournament in 2009, where Ghana lost in the finals to DR Congo.

In November 2013, coach Maxwell Konadu, invited him to be a part of the Ghana squad for the 2013 WAFU Nations Cup.[2] He helped the team to a first-place finish after Ghana beat Senegal by three goals to one.
