= Gustave Bebbe =

Cameroonian professional footballer

Personal information
- Full name: Gustave Anicet Bebbe Mbangue
- Date of birth: 22 June 1982 (age 44)
- Place of birth: Yaoundé, Cameroon
- Height: 1.75 m (5 ft 9 in)
- Positions: Winger; forward

Team information
- Current team: Gebzespor

Senior career*
Years	Team	Apps	(Gls)
2004–2005	Cotonsport Garoua	20	(2)
2005–2006	Konyaspor	28	(8)
2006–2008	Ankaragücü	66	(25)
2008–2009	İstanbul BB	19	(6)
2009–2010	Ankaragücü	4	(0)
2010	Diyarbakırspor	15	(3)
2010–2011	Kasımpaşa	5	(0)
2011–2012	Sông Lam Nghệ An	26	(5)
2015–2016	Mudanyaspor		
2016–2017	Ergene Velimeşe		
2017	Serik Belediyespor		
2018–	Gebzespor		

International career
2008	Cameroon U23		
2008	Cameroon	3	(1)
- * Club domestic league appearances and goals as of

Gustave Anicet Bebbe Mbangue (born 22 June 1982) is a Cameroonian professional footballer who plays for Turkish club Gebzespor. He is a winger, but also plays at forward.

== Club career ==
Bebbe was born in Yaoundé, Cameroon.

In November 2011, Bebbe signed to play with reigning Vietnamese champions Sông Lam Nghệ An of the V-League.

== International career ==
Bebbe also has Turkish citizenship under the name M. Alper Aydın, however, he lost his eligibility to play for Turkey when he was capped for Cameroon in June 2008.
