= Phan Thanh Hưng =

Vietnamese footballer

Personal information
- Full name: Phan Thanh Hưng
- Date of birth: January 14, 1987 (age 39)
- Place of birth: Sơn Trà, Đà Nẵng, Vietnam
- Height: 1.73 m (5 ft 8 in)
- Position: Central midfielder

Youth career
- 1999–2006: SHB Đà Nẵng

Senior career*
Years	Team	Apps	(Gls)
2007–2014	SHB Đà Nẵng	60	(14)
2014–2020	Quảng Nam	136	(18)
2020–2021	Cần Thơ	7	(0)

International career
2009–2012	Vietnam U23	21	(0)
2009–2015	Vietnam	9	(1)
- * Club domestic league appearances and goals as of 2 April 2017

Phan Thanh Hưng (born 14 January 1987) is a Vietnamese footballer who plays as a central midfielder for V.League 2 club Cần Thơ and the Vietnam national football team.

== International goals ==
#	Date	Venue	Opponent	Score	Result	Competition
1.	September 11, 2012	Shah Alam, Shah Alam Stadium	Malaysia	1–0	2–0	Friendly

== Achievements ==
=== Club ===
Quảng Nam

- V.League 1: 2017
