= Nguyễn Hồng Việt =

Vietnamese footballer (born 1989)

Personal information
- Full name: Nguyễn Hồng Việt
- Date of birth: June 30, 1989 (age 37)
- Place of birth: Quế Phong, Nghệ An, Vietnam
- Height: 1.77 m (5 ft 10 in)
- Position: Midfielder

Youth career
- 2000–2007: Sông Lam Nghệ An

Senior career*
Years	Team	Apps	(Gls)
2008–2014	Sông Lam Nghệ An	180	(11)
2015	Đồng Nai	14	(2)
2016–2017	Hải Phòng	7	(0)
2017–2018	Hồ Chí Minh City	7	(0)
2019–2021	An Giang	23	(0)

International career
2007–2009	Vietnam U20	1	(0)
- * Club domestic league appearances and goals

Nguyễn Hồng Việt (born 30 June 1989) is a Vietnamese former footballer who played as a midfielder.

== Career ==
Nguyễn most notably represented Sông Lam Nghệ An during his active football career, and he was part of the team winning the V-League in 2011.

== Honours ==
Sông Lam Nghệ An

- V-League: 2011
