= Navibank Sài Gòn FC =

Vietnamese football club

Navibank Sài Gòn
- Full name: Navibank Sài Gòn Football Club
- Founded: 1998 as Quân Khu 4
- Dissolved: 2012
- Ground: Thống Nhất Stadium, Ho Chi Minh City, Vietnam
- Capacity: 20000
Home colours	Away colours

Navibank Sài Gòn Football Club (Vietnamese: Câu lạc bộ bóng đá Navibank Sài Gòn), formerly known as Quân Khu 4, was a Vietnamese professional football club based in Ho Chi Minh City, active from 1998 to 5 December 2012.

Their home stadium was Thống Nhất Stadium.

== Honours ==
=== National competitions ===
League

- V.League 2:

(gold) Winners (1): 2008 (as Quân khu 4)
Cup

- Vietnamese National Cup:

(gold) Winners (1): 2011

== Season-by-season domestic record ==
Season	Pld	Won	Draw	Lost	GF	GA	GD	PTS	Final position	Notes
V-League 2010	26	4	8	14	21	39	−18	20	13th	
V-League 2011	26	9	7	10	36	37	−1	34	8th	Qualified for 2012 AFC Cup
V-League 2012	26	8	11	7	32	30	+2	35	7th	

== Performance in AFC competitions ==
- AFC Cup: 1 appearance

2012: Group stage

Season	Competition	Round	Club	Home	Away
2012	AFC Cup	Group stage	(Malaysia) Kelantan	1–2	0–0
2012	AFC Cup	Group stage	(Indonesia) Arema	3–1	2–6
2012	AFC Cup	Group stage	(Myanmar) Ayeyawady United	4–1	0–2
