= List of V.League 1 champions =

Champion of V.League 1
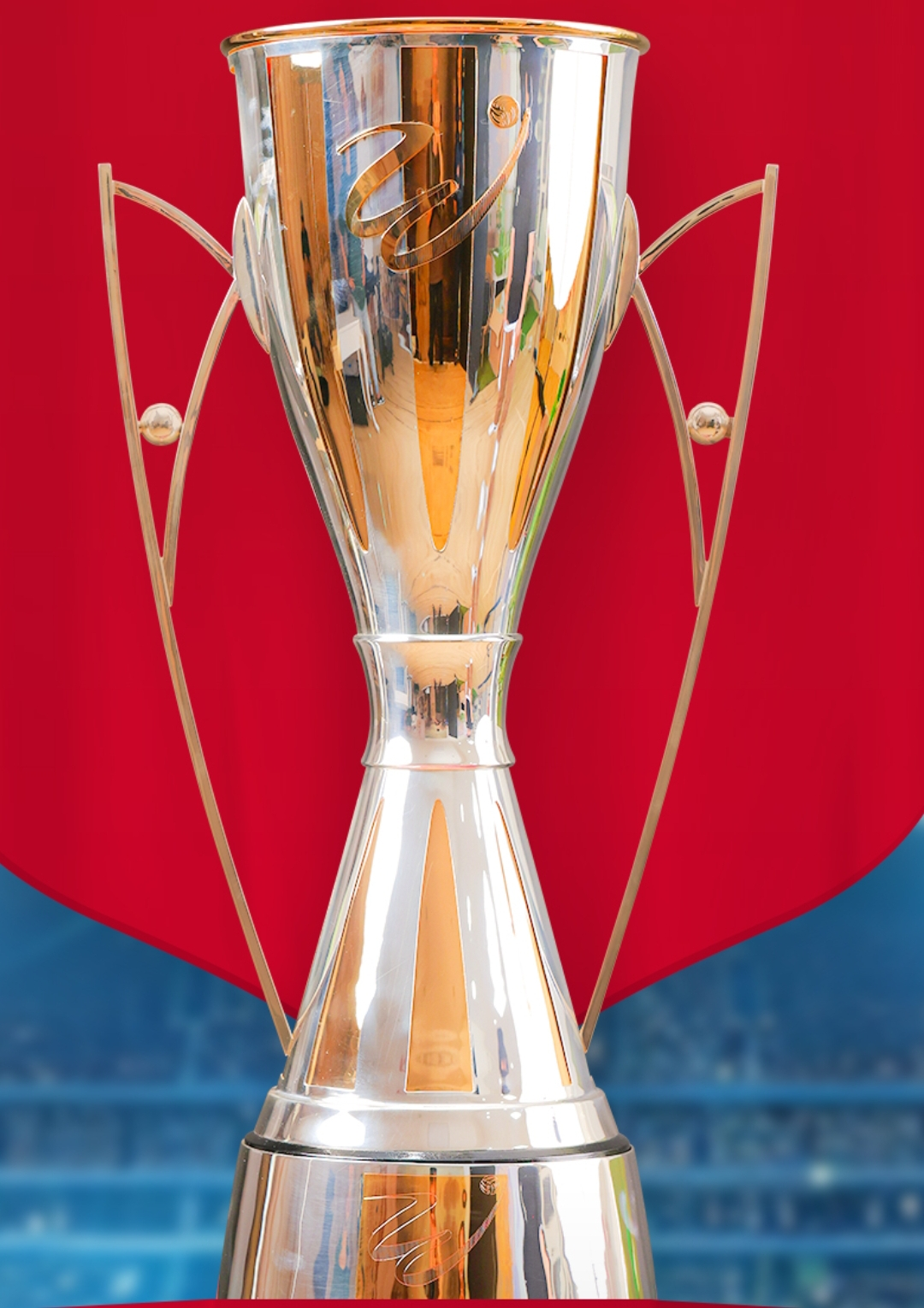
- Winner trophy from 2024
- Sport: Soccer
- League: V.League 1
- Awarded for: Team with the best record at the end of the season

Current holder
- Cong An Hanoi FC at May 17, 2026
- Season: 2025–26
- Match played: 26
- Record: 20–4–2
- Goals for: 58
- Goals against: 22
- Head coach: Alexandré Pölking

Due to the longevity of the V.League 1, the league has seen many teams win the championship, since the inaugural season in 1980. Previously, Vietnamese soccer had a long history dating back to 1896, when this sport was first introduced to Saigon by the French people, and then gradually spread to the Tonkin and Annam. After 1954, due to the division of the country, Vietnamese soccer was split into two regions with two independent soccer systems. The North Vietnam began organizing its first championship in 1955, called the Hòa Bình League, which was renamed the National Class A League a year later. Meanwhile, the South Vietnam is also known to have had its own domestic league, with matches starting in 1950. After the country was reunified in 1975, domestic championships were divided into three regions and took place from 1976 to 1979, including the Hồng Hà League in the North, the Trường Sơn League in the Central and the Cửu Long League in the South. Based on this, the General Department of Sports decided to organize a nationwide league, starting in 1980 with the name National A1 League; this is considered a milestone marking the birth of the current V.League 1, with the first champion of the league was the Tong Cuc Duong Sat FC, who finished the season undefeated.

After a period of preparation, in 1989, the VFF was established as the governing body for domestic activities, including national-level soccer leagues. However, in 2011, following conflicts between some clubs and the VFF, the Vietnam Professional Soccer JSC (VPF) was created, replacing the VFF's role in organizing and managing national professional soccer leagues.

== List of champions by season ==
=== Format ===
- From the 1980 to 1995 seasons, teams were divided into groups based on geographical region. Within each group, teams played a double round-robin format. The top teams from each group advanced to the championship round, while the bottom teams played in a relegation round to determine which team would be relegated.
- In the 1996 season, teams played a double round-robin, with the bottom two teams facing relegation. Subsequently, the top six teams were split into two groups to play another double round-robin, with the top two teams from each group advancing to compete for the championship.
- From the 1997 to 2019 seasons (excluding the 1999 tournament), teams played a double round-robin format. This format was reinstated for the 2022 season.
- In the 2020 season, after an initial single round-robin stage, the top eight teams played a single round-robin to determine the champion, while the remaining six teams played a single round-robin to decide the relegation spot. This format was used again in the 2023 season, the final season to be held within a single calendar year.
- The 2021 season (which was cancelled due to the COVID-19 pandemic) featured a format similar to 2020, but with a different group split (six teams competing for the championship and eight teams fighting to avoid relegation).
- Starting from the 2023–24 season, teams play a double round-robin format spanning from the second half of one year to the first half of the following year.

=== National A1 Championship (1980–1989) ===
Superscripts in brackets (such as ^{(2)}) indicate a repeat win.

Season	Champion	Runner-up	Third place
National A1 League
1980	Tổng Cục Đường Sắt	Công An Hà Nội	Hải Quan
1981–82	Quân Đội ^{(1)}	Quân Khu Thủ Đô	Công An Hà Nội
1982–83	Quân Đội ^{(2)}	Hải Quan	Cảng Hải Phòng
1984	Công An Hà Nội	Quân Đội	Sở Công Nghiệp TP.HCM
1985	Công Nghiệp Hà Nam Ninh	Sở Công Nghiệp TP.HCM	Quân Đội
1986	Cảng Sài Gòn	Quân Đội	Hải Quan
1987	Quân Đội ^{(3)}	Quảng Nam-Đà Nẵng	An Giang
1989	Đồng Tháp	Quân Đội	Công An Hà Nội

=== National Elite League (1990–1996) ===
Season	Champion	Goals	Runner-up	Goals
1990	Quân Đội	4	Quảng Nam–Đà Nẵng	0
1991	Hải Quan^{PSO}	2	Quảng Nam–Đà Nẵng	2
1992	Quảng Nam–Đà Nẵng	2	Công An Hải Phòng	0
1993–94	Cảng Sài Gòn	2	Công An TP.HCM	0
1995	Công An TP.HCM	3	Hue FC	1
1996	Đồng Tháp FC	3	Công An TP.HCM	1

^{PSO}Winning after penalty shoot-out

=== National First Division (1997–2000) ===
Season	Teams	Winner	Record							Points	Coach
Season	Teams	Winner	Pld	W	D	L	GF	GA	GD	Points	Coach
1997	12	Cảng Sài Gòn	22	12	4	6	22	15	+7	40	N/A
1998	14	Quân Đội	26	13	8	5	40	20	+20	47	(Vietnam) Vương Tiến Dũng
1999–2000	13 (Note: Vĩnh Long was expelled from the league after the team's players and staffs assaulted the referee during Matchday 14. As the result, all Vĩnh Long's previous results were annulled.)	Song Lam Nghe An FC	24	11	10	3	35	20	+15	43	(Vietnam) Nguyễn Thành Vinh

=== V.League 1 (2000–) ===
Ed.	Season	Teams	Winner	Record							Points	Coach
Ed.	Season	Teams	Winner	Pld	W	D	L	GF	GA	GD	Points	Coach
1	2000–01	10	Song Lam Nghe An FC	18	11	3	4	30	15	+15	36	(Vietnam) Nguyễn Thành Vinh
2	2001–02	10	Saigon Port FC	18	9	5	4	20	16	+4	32	(Vietnam) Phạm Huỳnh Tam Lang
3	2003	12	Hoang Anh Gia Lai FC	22	12	7	3	41	26	+15	43	(Thailand) Arjhan Srong-ngamsub
4	2004	12	Hoang Anh Gia Lai FC (2)	22	14	4	4	40	15	+25	46	(Thailand) Arjhan Srong-ngamsub
5	2005	12	Long An FC	22	12	6	4	43	25	+18	42	(Vietnam) Huỳnh Ngọc San
6	2006	13 (Note: Initially, the season had 14 teams, but Ngan Hang Dong A FC was not allowed to participate due to a referee bribery scandal in the 2005 First Division, the season in which the team successfully achieved promotion by finishing third overall.)	Long An FC (2)	24	12	4	8	38	32	+6	40	(Vietnam) Huỳnh Ngọc San
7	2007	14	Becamex Binh Duong FC	26	16	7	3	42	22	+20	55	(Vietnam) Lê Thụy Hải
8	2008	14	Becamex Binh Duong FC (2)	26	14	5	7	32	18	+14	47	(Vietnam) Lê Thụy Hải
9	2009	14	SHB Da Nang	26	15	5	6	48	30	+18	50	(Vietnam) Lê Huỳnh Đức
10	2010	14	Hanoi T&T	26	14	4	8	35	25	+10	46	(Vietnam) Phan Thanh Hùng
11	2011	14	Song Lam Nghe An FC (2)	26	15	4	7	48	29	+19	49	(Vietnam) Nguyễn Hữu Thắng
12	2012	14	SHB Da Nang (2)	26	14	6	6	47	31	+16	48	(Vietnam) Lê Huỳnh Đức
13	2013	11 (Note: Xuan Thanh Saigon Cement FC withdraw 2013 V.League 1 after round 20.)	Hanoi T&T (2)	20	11	5	4	46	24	+22	38	(Vietnam) Phan Thanh Hùng
14	2014	12 (Note: Initially, the season had 13 teams, but on April 13, 2014, Vissai Ninh Bình FC sent a letter to the Vietnam Football Federation (VFF) and the Vietnam Professional Football Joint Stock Company (VPF) to announce their withdrawal from domestic competitions, but only continued to participate in the AFC Cup, due to 13 players being found to be involved in match-fixing in an AFC Cup match. The team had played 8 matches and was ranked third in the standings at that time. After withdrawing from the tournament, all of the team's results were annulled, leaving only 12 teams at the end of the season.)	Becamex Binh Duong FC (3)	22	15	4	3	53	23	+30	49	(Vietnam) Nguyễn Thanh Sơn (Note: From the round 5 of the season)
15	2015	14	Becamex Binh Duong FC (4)	26	16	4	6	57	33	+24	52	(Vietnam) Nguyễn Thanh Sơn
16	2016	14	Hanoi T&T (3)	26	16	2	8	45	28	+17	50 (Note: Hanoi T&T and Haiphong FC are tied on points. Head-to-head results: Hanoi T&T 2–1 Haiphong FC, Haiphong FC 2–1 Hanoi T&T; Hanoi T&T ranked higher due to goal difference.)	(Vietnam) Chu Đình Nghiêm
17	2017	14	Quang Nam FC	26	13	9	4	46	32	+14	48 (Note: Quang Nam FC and FLC Thanh Hoa are tied on points. Head-to-head results: Quang Nam FC 1–1 FLC Thanh Hoa, FLC Thanh Hoa 2–3 Quang Nam FC.)	(Vietnam) Hoàng Văn Phúc
18	2018	14	Hanoi FC (4) (Note: Won the fourth title with the new name Hanoi FC)	26	20	4	2	72	30	+42	64	(Vietnam) Chu Đình Nghiêm
19	2019	14	Hanoi FC (5)	26	15	8	3	60	30	+30	53	(Vietnam) Chu Đình Nghiêm
20	2020	14	Viettel FC	20 (Note: The 2020 season was postponed several times due to the COVID-19 pandemic. After the situation stabilized, the league resumed with a new competition format adopted on May 16, 2020.)	12	5	3	29	16	+13	41	(Vietnam) Trương Việt Hoàng
21	2021	14	Competition abandoned due to COVID-19 pandemic									
22	2022	13	Hanoi FC (6)	24	15	6	3	17	21	+26	51	(South Korea) Chun Jae-ho (Note: Acting as interim manager after Park Choong-kyun resigned.)
23	2023	14	Cong An Hanoi FC (2)	20 (Note: The 2023 season was not played in a double round-robin format to facilitate the change in the match schedule.)	11	5	4	39	21	+18	38 (Note: Hanoi Police FC and Hanoi FC are tied on points. Hanoi Police FC ranked higher due to goal difference.)	(Vietnam) Trần Tiến Đại (Note: Acting as interim manager after Paulo Foiani fired.)
24	2023–24	14	Thep Xanh Nam Dinh F.C. (2) (Note: First title in 1985 A1 National Football Championship with the name Ha Nam Ninh F.C.)	26	16	5	5	60	38	+22	53	(Vietnam) Vũ Hồng Việt
25	2024–25	14	Thep Xanh Nam Dinh F.C. (2)	26	17	6	3	51	18	+33	57	(Vietnam) Vũ Hồng Việt
26	2025–26	14	Cong An Hanoi FC (3)	26	20	4	2	58	22	+36	64	(Germany) (Brazil) Alexandré Pölking
27	2026–27	To be determined										

== Statistics by number of titles ==
=== Titles by club ===
Club	Winners	Runners-up	Winning seasons
Hà Nội	6	7	2010, 2013, 2016, 2018, 2019, 2022
Thể Công-Viettel	6	4	1981–82, 1982–83, 1987, 1990, 1998, 2020
Becamex Bình Dương	4	2	2007, 2008, 2014, 2015
Hồ Chí Minh City	4	1	1986, 1993–94, 1997, 2001–02
SHB Đà Nẵng	3	4	1992, 2009, 2012
Song Lam Nghe An FC	3	3	1999–2000, 2000–01, 2011
Nam Định	3	2	1985, 2023–24, 2024–25
Công An Hà Nội	3	1	1984, 2023, 2025–26
Long An	2	3	2005, 2006
Hoàng Anh Gia Lai	2	2	2003, 2004
Đồng Tháp	2	0	1989, 1996
Công An Thành phố Hồ Chí Minh	1	4	1995
Hải Quan	1	2	1991
Tổng cục Đường sắt	1	0	1980
Quảng Nam	1	0	2017
