= 2014 V.League 1 =

V.League 1
- Season: 2014
- Dates: 11 January – 10 August
- Champions: Becamex Bình Dương
- Runner up: Hà Nội T&T
- Relegated: Hùng Vương An Giang
- Champions League: Becamex Bình Dương
- AFC Cup: Hà Nội T&T
- Matches: 112
- Goals: 391 (3.49 per match)
- Top goalscorer: Hoàng Vũ Samson (23 goals)
- Biggest home win: Đồng Nai 8–0 Thanh Hóa (12 April, 2014)
- Biggest away win: Đồng Tâm Long An 1–6 Hà Nội T&T (28 March, 2014)
- Highest scoring: Hà Nội T&T 6–4 Than Quảng Ninh (22 June, 2014)
- Longest winning run: Becamex Bình Dương (8 matches)
- Longest unbeaten run: Becamex Bình Dương (11 matches)
- Longest winless run: Hùng Vương An Giang (11 matches)
- Longest losing run: Hùng Vương An Giang (9 matches)
- All statistics correct as of 13 August 2014.

The 2014 V.League 1 (known as the Eximbank V.League 1 for sponsorship reasons) season was the 31st season of the V.League 1, the highest division of Vietnamese football and the 14th as a professional league. The season began on 11 January 2014 and finished on 10 August 2014.

On August, Becamex Bình Dương clinched their third league title after a 1–1 draw against SHB Đà Nẵng.

== Changes from last season ==
=== Team changes ===
The following teams have changed division since the 2013 season.

==== To V.League 1 ====
Promoted from V.League 2

- Hùng Vương An Giang
- QNK Quảng Nam
- Than Quảng Ninh

==== From V.League 1 ====
Folded

- Kienlongbank Kiên Giang

Relegated

- Xuân Thành Sài Gòn

=== Rule Changes ===
The Vietnam Football Federation passed a resolution on December 5 that stated only one club was to face relegation to the 2015 V.League 2 at the end of the 2014 campaign. Two clubs from the 2014 V.League 2 will be promoted to the 2015 V.League 1 campaign.

== Teams ==
Of the 13 participating teams, ten remain following the 2013 V.League 1. They are joined by three teams promoted from the 2013 V.League 2. Kienlongbank Kiên Giang withdrew from the 2014 campaign, citing financial issues.

Locations of Clubs for the 2014 V-League season

=== Match-fixing scandal ===
Ninh Bình wrote to the Vietnam Football Federation (VFF) and to the Vietnam Professional Football Joint Stock Company to be allowed to stop their participation in the league and also the AFC Cup due to 13 players being involved in match fixing. They had played 8 league matches and were third from bottom at the time. Following their withdrawal from the league, all their results were declared null and void.

=== Rule Changes ===
Due to the match fixing scandal and withdrawal of Ninh Bình, it was decided that the bottom-placed team at the end of the season will take part in a play-off match against the third-placed team in the First Division for the right to play in the V-League next season.

=== Stadium and locations ===
Club	Based	Home stadium	Capacity	First season in V.League	Manager
Becamex Bình Dương	Thủ Dầu Một	Gò Đậu Stadium	18,250	2004	(Vietnam) Lê Thụy Hải
Đồng Nai	Biên Hòa	Đồng Nai Stadium	25,000	2013	(Vietnam) Trần Bình Sự
Đồng Tâm Long An	Tân An	Long An Stadium	19,975	2003	(Vietnam) Ngô Quang Sang
Hà Nội T&T	Hà Nội	Hàng Đẫy Stadium	22,000	2008	(Vietnam) Phan Thanh Hùng
Hải Phòng	Hải Phòng	Lạch Tray Stadium	28,000	2000	(England) Dylan Kerr
Hoàng Anh Gia Lai	Pleiku	Pleiku Stadium	12,000	2003	(South Korea) Choi Yun-Kyum
Hùng Vương An Giang	Long Xuyên	An Giang Stadium	15,200	2014	(Vietnam) Nhan Thiện Nhân
QNK Quảng Nam	Tam Kỳ	Tam Kỳ Stadium	15,624	2014	(Vietnam) Vũ Quang Bảo
SHB Đà Nẵng	Đà Nẵng	Chi Lăng Stadium	28,000	2001	(Vietnam) Lê Huỳnh Đức
Sông Lam Nghệ An	Vinh	Vinh Stadium	12,000	2000	(Vietnam) Nguyễn Hữu Thắng
Than Quảng Ninh	Cẩm Phả	Cẩm Phả Stadium	15,000	2014	(Vietnam) Đinh Cao Nghĩa
Thanh Hóa	Thanh Hóa	Thanh Hóa Stadium	14,000	2010	(Vietnam) Hoàng Thanh Tùng (interim)
XM The Vissai Ninh Bình	Ninh Bình	Ninh Bình Stadium	22,000	2010	(Vietnam) Nguyễn Văn Sỹ

=== Sponsors of football teams ===
Team	Kits	Sponsors
Becamex Binh Duong		Becamex IDC
Dong Nai		
Dong Tam Long An		Dong Tam Group
Hanoi T&T	Kappa	BSH; Otran
Haiphong		Vicem
Hoang Anh Gia Lai		
Hung Vuong An Giang		Hung Vuong An Giang
QNK Quang Nam	Kappa (fake)	Collagea
SHB Da Nang		SHB
Song Lam Nghe An	Kappa	Bac A Bank
Than Quang Ninh		Vinacomin
Thanh Hoa		Viettel
XM The Vissai Ninh Binh		Vissai

=== Managerial changes ===
Team	Outgoing Head Coach	Manner of departure	Incoming Head Coach
Hải Phòng	(Vietnam) Hoàng Anh Tuấn	Contract terminated	(England) Dylan Kerr
Becamex Bình Dương	(Vietnam) Nguyễn Minh Dũng	Sacked	(Vietnam) Lê Thụy Hải
Thanh Hóa	(Vietnam) Mai Đức Chung	Resigned	(Vietnam) Hoàng Thanh Tùng (interim)

=== Foreign players ===
Club	Visa 1	Visa 2	Visa 3	Non-Visa Foreign
Becamex Bình Dương	(Uganda) Moses Oloya	(Senegal) Abass Cheikh Dieng	(Nigeria) Abdullahi Suleiman	(Brazil) Marcelo Barbieri^{1} (Brazil) Kesley Alves^{1} (Nigeria) Theophilus Esele^{1} (Slovakia) Robert^{1}
Đồng Nai	(Brazil) Thiago Aquino	(Brazil) Luiz Henrique	(Spain) Candelario Gomez	(Kenya) Rodgers Nandwa^{1}
Đồng Tâm Long An	(Nigeria) Ganiyu Oseni	(Montenegro) Zdravko Dragićević	(South Korea) Shim Un-seob	none
Hà Nội T&T	(Argentina) Gonzalo Marronkle	(Trinidad and Tobago) Hughtun Hector	(Trinidad and Tobago) Daneil Cyrus	(Nigeria) Samson Kayode^{1}
Hải Phòng	(Zimbabwe) Justice Majabvi	(Jamaica) Andre Fagan	(Brazil) Lucas Gaúcho	(Ghana) Issifu Ansah^{1}
Hoàng Anh Gia Lai	(Nigeria) Bassey Akpan	(Nigeria) Felix Ogbuke	(Nigeria) Timothy Anjembe	(Brazil) Hélio da Silva^{1} (Thailand) Đoàn Văn Sakda^{2}
Hùng Vương An Giang	(Togo) Vincent Bossou	(Democratic Republic of the Congo) Patiyo Tambwe	(Nigeria) Felix Ajala	(Nigeria) Maxwell Eyerakpo^{1} (Brazil) Fábio dos Santos^{1}
QNK Quảng Nam	(Uganda) Henry Kisekka	(Brazil) Almeida	(Brazil) Junior Rodrigues De Azevedo	(Brazil) Marcos Jeferson^{1}
SHB Đà Nẵng	(Croatia) Adrian Valentić	(Brazil) Jhonatan Bernardo	(Serbia) Bojan Mamić	none
Sông Lam Nghệ An	(Cameroon) Paul Emile Biyaga	(Brazil) Moreira	(Romania) Petrișor Voinea	none
Than Quảng Ninh	(Nigeria) Peter Omoduemuke	(Nigeria) Uche Iheruome	(Nigeria) Sunday Emmanuel	none
Thanh Hóa	(Netherlands) Danny van Bakel	(Slovenia) Nastja Čeh	(Serbia) Slobodan Dinčić	(Brazil) Rogerio Machado^{1} (Ghana) Jonathan Quartey^{2} (Brazil) Rodrigo Mota^{1} (Nigeria) Dio Preye^{1} (Nigeria) Amaobi Uzowuru
XM The Vissai Ninh Bình				

Note:
^{1}Those players who were born and started their professional career abroad but have since gained Vietnamese Residency;
^{2}Vietnamese residents who have chosen to represent another national team

== League table ==
Pos	Team	Pld	W	D	L	GF	GA	GD	Pts	Qualification or relegation
1	Becamex Bình Dương	22	15	4	3	53	23	+30	49	Qualification for the Mekong Club Championship & AFC Champions League Group stage
2	Hà Nội T&T	22	14	5	3	66	39	+27	47	Qualification for the AFC Championship League qualifying play-off
3	Thanh Hóa	22	12	4	6	32	49	−17	40	
4	SHB Đà Nẵng	22	11	6	5	43	33	+10	39	
5	Sông Lam Nghệ An	22	10	6	6	38	26	+12	36	
6	Than Quảng Ninh	22	9	2	11	42	44	−2	29	
7	Đồng Nai	22	7	4	11	39	40	−1	25	
8	QNK Quảng Nam	22	7	4	11	34	52	−18	25	
9	Hoàng Anh Gia Lai	22	5	8	9	41	48	−7	23	
10	Hải Phòng	22	5	6	11	16	27	−11	21	
11	Đồng Tâm Long An	22	5	6	11	29	45	−16	21	
12	Hùng Vương An Giang (R)	22	3	3	16	22	44	−22	12	V.League 1 play-offs
13	XM The Vissai Ninh Bình	0	0	0	0	0	0	0	0	Withdrew

Updated to match(es) played on 16 August 2014. Source: Vietnam Professional Football
Rules for classification: 1) points; 2) goal difference; 3) number of goals scored.
(R) Relegated

== Results ==
=== Summary ===
Home \ Away	BBD	ĐNA	ĐTLA	HNT	HAI	HAGL	HAG	QNK	SDN	SLNA	TQN	THO	VNB
Becamex Bình Dương		4–1	3–1	2–0	2–0	4–1	3–0	5–2	1–1	2–1	0–0	2–0	
Đồng Nai	3–3		0–1	2–3	0–1	3–2	0–1	5–1	2–1	1–3	1–3	8–0	
Đồng Tâm Long An	1–3	1–1		1–6	2–2	2–2	3–1	0–2	2–4	1–2	2–1	2–0	
Hà Nội T&T	4–2	2–0	3–3		5–2	3–1	4–1	2–2	2–0	2–2	6–4	5–2	
Hải Phòng	0–2	1–2	1–1	2–3		1–1	2–0	0–2	2–1	2–5	2–1	0–0	
Hoàng Anh Gia Lai	1–1	2–4	1–2	1–4	2–1		2–0	3–5	4–5	3–1	3–2	1–1	
Hùng Vương An Giang	1–4	0–0	2–0	3–4	1–1	3–3		5–3	1–2	1–2	1–2	1–2	
QNK Quảng Nam	1–3	1–0	1–0	3–3	1–1	2–1	1–0		0–3	0–3	6–3	2–3	
SHB Đà Nẵng	1–3	2–2	3–1	2–1	2–1	1–1	2–0	0–0		2–1	2–2	4–2	
Sông Lam Nghệ An	0–2	0–1	2–2	1–1	3–1	0–0	1–0	6–1	1–1		2–1	1–2	
Than Quảng Ninh	2–1	5–3	3–0	1–2	0–3		2–0	2–0	3–4	0–1		1–0	
Thanh Hóa	2–1	3–0	2–1	3–1	1–0	2–2	1–0	2–0	1–0	0–0	3–2		
XM The Vissai Ninh Bình													

Updated to match(es) played on 10 August 2014. Source: Vietnam Professional Football
Legend: Blue = home team win; Yellow = draw; Red = away team win.

=== V.League 1 play-off ===
16 August 2014
16:00 UTC+7

Hùng Vương An Giang	0–3	XSKT Cần Thơ
	Report	Hải Dương 22'; Diabate 57'; Belibi 65'

Gò Đậu Stadium, Thủ Dầu Một
Attendance: 6,000
Referee: Chaiya Mahapab (Thailand)

== Season statistics ==
=== Top scorers ===
As of 10 August 2014

Rank	Player	Club	Goals
1	(Vietnam) Hoàng Vũ Samson	Hà Nội T&T	23
2	(Nigeria) Timothy Anjembe	Hoàng Anh Gia Lai	18
3	(Senegal) Abass Cheikh Dieng	Becamex Bình Dương	16
4	(Argentina) Gonzalo	Hà Nội T&T	13
4	(Nigeria) Uche Iheruome	Than Quảng Ninh	13
6	(Vietnam) Nguyễn Hải Anh	Đồng Nai	12
6	(Vietnam) Đinh Thanh Trung	QNK Quảng Nam	12
8	(Vietnam) Nguyễn Văn Quyết	Hà Nội T&T	11
9	(Vietnam) Lê Công Vinh	Sông Lam Nghệ An	9
10	(Vietnam) Nguyễn Anh Đức	Becamex Bình Dương	8

=== Hat-tricks ===
Player	For	Against	Result	Date
(Nigeria) Timothy Anjembe	Hoàng Anh Gia Lai	Sông Lam Nghệ An	3–1	9 February 2014
(Vietnam) Hoàng Vũ Samson	Hà Nội T&T	Đồng Tâm Long An	1–6	28 March 2014
(Brazil) Luiz Henrique	Đồng Nai	Thanh Hóa	8–0	12 April 2014
(Vietnam) Hoàng Vũ Samson	Hà Nội T&T	Hùng Vương An Giang	3–4	14 April 2014
(Nigeria) Timothy Anjembe	Hoàng Anh Gia Lai	Than Quảng Ninh	3–2	3 May 2014
(Vietnam) Nguyễn Văn Quyết	Hà Nội T&T	Đồng Nai	2–3	11 June 2014
(Vietnam) Hoàng Vũ Samson	Hà Nội T&T	Hoàng Anh Gia Lai	3–1	27 July 2014

^{*}: Scored four goals

== Awards ==
=== Annual awards ===
Award	Winner	Club
Manager of the Season	(Vietnam) Nguyễn Thanh Sơn	Becamex Bình Dương
Player of the Season	(Vietnam) Nguyễn Anh Đức	Becamex Bình Dương
Young Player of the Year	(Vietnam) Trần Minh Vương	Hoàng Anh Gia Lai
Best Referee	(Vietnam) Nguyễn Trọng Thư	
Best assistant referee	(Vietnam) Phạm Mạnh Long	

Team of the Year
Goalkeeper	(Vietnam) Nguyễn Quốc Thiện Esele (Becamex Bình Dương)			
Defence	(Vietnam) Nguyễn Văn Việt (Than Quảng Ninh)	(Netherlands) Danny van Bakel (FLC Thanh Hóa)	(Vietnam) Nguyễn Huy Cường (Than Quảng Ninh)	(Vietnam) Âu Văn Hoàn (Becamex Bình Dương)
Midfield	(Vietnam) Nguyễn Anh Đức (Becamex Bình Dương)	(Vietnam) Nguyễn Trọng Hoàng (Becamex Bình Dương)	(Vietnam) Hoàng Minh Tâm (SHB Đà Nẵng)	(Vietnam) Nguyễn Văn Quyết (Hà Nội T&T)
Attack	(Senegal) Abass Cheikh Dieng (Becamex Bình Dương)		(Vietnam) Hoàng Vũ Samson (Hà Nội T&T)	

==== Team ====
Award	Recipient	Notes
Best Organizer	Becamex Bình Dương	
Best Young Training	Sông Lam Nghệ An	
Best Fan Club	Than Quảng Ninh	
Best Field	Becamex Bình Dương	
