= V.League 1 =

Association football league in Vietnam

- Organising body: Vietnam Professional Football
- Founded: 1980; 46 years ago
- First season: 1980
- Country: Vietnam
- Confederation: AFC
- Number of clubs: 14
- Level on pyramid: 1
- Relegation to: V.League 2
- Domestic cup(s): Vietnamese Cup; Vietnamese Super Cup
- International cup(s): AFC Champions League Two; ASEAN Club Championship
- Current champions: Công an Hà Nội (3rd title) (2025–26)
- Most championships: Hanoi; Thể Công–Viettel (6 titles)
- Most appearances: Lê Tấn Tài (434)
- Top scorer: Hoàng Vũ Samson (209)
- Broadcasters: FPT Play; TV360 (all matches); VTV (VTV6, VTV7); HTV (HTV Thể Thao)(selected matches)
- Website: vpf.vn
- Current: 2026–27 V.League 1

V.League 1 (Vietnamese pronunciation: [vi:˧ li:k˧], Vietnamese: Giải bóng đá Vô địch Quốc gia, lit. 'National Football Championship') is the top professional football league in Vietnam, commercially organized by the Vietnam Professional Football JSC (VPF). It is contested by 14 clubs who play each other on a home and away basis. The team finishing at the top at the end of the season is crowned the champion and enters the AFC Champions League Two.

The league was founded in 1980 as the National A1 League, with Tổng cục Đường sắt being the first winner. The league turned professional in the 2000–01 season, which allowed clubs to hire foreign players. From 2012, the organising power was transferred from the Vietnam Football Federation (VFF) to Vietnam Professional Football JSC (VPF) as a joint venture between VFF and participating clubs.

Thể Công-Viettel and Hanoi have won the title 6 times each, the most among V-League clubs. The current champion is Cong An Hanoi, which won the 2025–26 edition.

== History ==
=== Pre-unification to 1976 and pre-V-League to 1979 ===
The North Vietnam Football Championship was formed in 1955. From the beginning, this League (AKA the Northern league) was split into Division A and Division B. The South Vietnam Football Championship was formed in 1950. Since then, league football has been played North and South during war time. Thể Công was the most successful team in the North by winning 9 national titles, while Tổng Tham Mưu dominated the South Vietnam league with 11 titles.

After Vietnam's reunification in 1975, an unified Vietnamese football league was yet to be held due to logistics problems. As the result, three separate regional leagues were created, with the northern league named Hồng Hà League, the central named as Trường Sơn League and the southern named as Cửu Long League.

=== Foundation and early days ===
The V.League 1, as it is known today, began in 1980 when the first National A1 League was launched. Seventeen clubs participated in the competition (originally 18, but Thể Công withdrawn due to internal reasons) which was split into three groups and conducted more like a cup competition, with the winner from each group qualifying for the Championship Stage. Công An Hà Nội, Tổng Cục Đường Sắt and Hải Quan were the three teams to qualify, with Tổng Cục Đường Sắt ultimately taking the title. That format, reduced to two groups, continued until 1995 when the league reverted to a more traditional league format.

In 1990, the league was renamed to the National Elite Football Championship, before being referred as the National First Division in 1997.

=== Turning professional ===
League football in Vietnam turned professional in the 2000–2001 season, which saw the league change its name to its current moniker, V-League. In that inaugural V-League season, only ten clubs participated, with tighter restrictions meaning fewer teams. Over the next decade, the league grew from 10 teams to the current fourteen, with the team that finishes on top of the table qualifying for the AFC Champions League Group Stage. Clubs were allowed to hire foreign players from this season on.

=== VPF establishment ===
Following a season marred by accusations of refereeing corruption and a cover-up by the V.League governing body Vietnam Football Federation (VFF), six clubs (Dong Tam Long An, Hoang Anh Gia Lai, Hanoi ACB, Vissai Ninh Binh, Khatoco Khanh Hoa and Lam Son Thanh Hoa) threatened to leave the league and form an entirely new league for the 2012 season. The most outspoken club in the move was Hanoi ACB, who had been relegated from the V.League, with its chairman Nguyễn Đức Kiên announcing that ACB would spearhead the move. Due to the controversy, EximBank expressed its intention to drop its title sponsorship of the league. League officials scrambled to resolve the issues, going so far as to hire foreign referees for the 2012 season. After a meeting on 29 September, representatives of the VFF, the 14 V.League 1 teams, and 14 V.League 2 teams announced the formation of a new corporation, the VPF, Vietnam Professional Football Joint Stock Company to manage the V-League. The VFF would hold a 36% stake in the new corporation, and the rest would be held by clubs.

From the 2012 season, the organising power was transferred from the VFF to the VPF (Vietnamese Professional Football), and the "V-League" was renamed the "Super League". This name change was short-lived, reverting to "V.League 1" later in the season. The First Division was also renamed the "V.League 2". At the same time, many clubs found themselves with financial problems and sponsor issues, and many withdrew, merged, bought another club, or failed to meet league requirements. As a result, the number of clubs in each league changed dramatically.

=== Season change ===
From 2023, the V.League 1's schedule was restructured. The 2023 V.League 1 season was the last season to be played from spring to autumn format. The 2023–24 V.League 1 season ran from autumn 2023 to near summer 2024, in line with most domestic leagues in the world.

== Competition format ==
- The V.League 1 season starts in August/September and ends in June next year (previously started from February/March to September). In each season, each club plays each of the other clubs twice, once at home and another away, for a total of 26 games.
- Teams are ranked by total points, head-to-head, goal difference and goals scored (depending on the regulations).
- Winner qualifies for AFC Champions League Two group stage.
- For 2010 season, two bottom teams are relegated to the Vietnam First Division while third lowest placed team goes to play-off with the third highest placed team from the First Division.
- Starting in the 2013 season, the number of clubs participating in the V.League 1 would be decreased from fourteen to twelve after three clubs failed to register. Also in the same season, the bottom team will be relegated to the First Division while the top three teams from the First Division will be promoted into the V-League 1.
- Starting in the 2015 season, the league is competed by 14 teams.

== International competitions ==
=== Qualification for Asian competitions ===
==== Qualification criteria for 2027–28 ====
The V.League 1 winner qualify automatically for the subsequent season's AFC Champions League Two group stage and runner-ups qualify for the AFC Champions League Two qualifying play-offs.

As of 17 May 2026, the coefficients for are as follows:

Ranking		Member association (L: League, C: Cup)	Club points								Total	2027–28 Competition Slot Allocation (direct+indirect)			
Region	2025–26	Member association (L: League, C: Cup)	2017 (×0.3)	2018 (×0.4)	2019 (×0.5)	2021 (×0.6)	2022 (×0.7)	2023–24 (×0.8)	2024–25 (×0.9)	2025–26 (×1.0)	Total	ACLE	ACL2	ACGL	Total
East Region
E6	11	Malaysia (L, C)	4.395	3.633	4.450	4.000	9.677	6.213	15.511	12.083	45.184	1+0	1+0	0	2
E7	14	Singapore (L, C)	5.138	5.617	4.133	0.000	3.253	3.640	14.833	14.500	38.894	0+1	1+0	0	2
E8	15	Vietnam (L, C)	2.800	3.267	10.752	6.000	5.300	5.400	11.333	8.667	38.020	0	1+1	0	2
E9	19	Cambodia (L, C)	1.683	2.250	1.000	0.000	2.070	5.620	11.000	10.100	27.850	0	1+1	0	2
E10	20	Indonesia (L, C)	0.000	4.100	5.045	0.000	3.960	3.560	7.204	11.033	27.299	0	1+1	0	2

==== Performance in Asian competitions ====
Currently, Vietnam is standing 14th in the AFC clubs ranking.

Since reunified Vietnam returned to Asian club football in 1992, 16 clubs has been made it to the AFC Champions League Elite, with 7 clubs failed to qualify to the group/league stage and only 9 made it. 17 clubs also made it to the AFC Champions League Two (formerly AFC Cup) and 6 clubs also made it to the Asian Cup Winners' Cup, with 3 clubs getting the semi-finals as their best result.

In results, Vietnamese teams had reached the semi-finals of the AFC Champions League Two (formerly AFC Cup) on two occasions, in 2009 AFC Cup by Bình Dương and ten years later in 2019 by Hà Nội. Quảng Nam-Đà Nẵng reached the semi-finals of the defuncted Asian Cup Winners' Cup in 1993..

=== Qualification for Southeast Asian competitions ===
==== Qualification criteria for 2027–28 ====
The V.League 1 winner and Vietnamese Cup winners qualify automatically for the subsequent season's ASEAN Club Championship group stage.

As of 18 November 2026, the allocation are as follows:

Member association	Group stage	Play-off
Vietnam (L, C)	2	—

==== Performance in ASEAN competitions ====
As of 2024–25 ASEAN Club Championship, Cong An Hanoi advanced and became the first Vietnamese team on the ASEAN Club Championship finals, but lost to Thai club Buriram United by penalties, finishing runners-up as best result. Becamex Bình Dương became the first Vietnamese team to win a Southeast Asian club competition.

== Prize money ==
Here are the prize money as of 2025–26 V.League 1:

Position	Prize (VND)
Champion	5,000,000,000
Runner-up	3,000,000,000
Third-place	1,500,000,000

== Sponsorship ==
Since the 2000–2001 season, the V.League 1 has been branded with a principal sponsor's name and logo. The following companies have acted as principal sponsors:

Period	Sponsor	Brand
1980–1989	No sponsor	National A1 League
1990–1996	No sponsor	National Elite League
1997–2000	No sponsor	National First Division
2000–2002	Strata	Strata V-League
2003	PepsiCo	Sting V-League
2004	Kinh Do	Kinh Do V-League
2005	Tan Hiep Phat	Number 1 V-League
2006	Eurowindow	Eurowindow V-League
2007–2010	Petrovietnam	Petrovietnam Gas V-League
2011–2014	Eximbank	Eximbank V.League 1 (Note: In response to recent allegations of corruption in the Vietnam Football Federation, Eximbank were reportedly "considering canceling their sponsorship" of the V-League, effective the 2012 season. "6 clubs want to leave V-League, set up own league". tuoitrenews.vn. Archived from the original on 8 December 2011.)
2015–2017	Toyota	Toyota V.League 1
2018	NutiFood	NutiCafe V.League 1
2019	Masan Group	Wake-up 247 V.League 1
2020–2021	LS Group	LS V.League 1
2022–2024	Ngọc Linh Ginseng	Night Wolf V.League 1
2024–	LPBank	LPBank V.League 1

== Controversies ==
=== 2013 controversy ===
After Xuan Thanh Saigon Cement was docked points for what the VFF deemed the club's unsportsmanlike conduct in fielding a non-competitive squad for their Matchday 20 meeting with Song Lam Nghe An, club officials announced that the club would withdraw from the league. On 22 August 2013, the VFF approved Xuân Thành Sài Gòn's withdrawal request. Matches involving the club were vacated. The VFF is still debating if the last place club will still be relegated to V.League 2, though the league charter states that the club in 12th place would be the only club relegated in the 2013 campaign.

Relegation was cancelled for the 2013 campaign after Xuan Thanh Saigon Cement withdrew from the V.League 1 before the conclusion of the season. QNK Quang Nam, Than Quang Ninh and Hung Vuong An Giang, as winners, first runners-up and second runners-up respectively, were promoted from the 2013 V.League 2 season. Kienlongbank Kien Giang failed to apply for the 2014 campaign and subsequently folded during the offseason.

=== 2014 match-fixing scandal ===
Vissai Ninh Binh wrote to the Vietnam Football Federation (VFF) and to the Vietnam Professional Football Joint Stock Company to be allowed to stop their participation in the league and also the AFC Cup due to 13 players being involved in match fixing. They had played eight league matches and were third from bottom at the time. Following their withdrawal from the league, all their results were declared null and void.

Due to the match fixing scandal and withdrawal of Vissai Ninh Binh, it was decided that the bottom-placed team at the end of the season will take part in a play-off match against the third-placed team in the First Division for the right to play in the V-League next season.

=== One owner, many teams ===
On July 5, 2019, Đoàn Nguyên Đức, chairman of Hoang Anh Gia Lai, commented on the situation of one owner owning multiple teams in the V.League. Bầu Đức's statement was reminiscent of Đỗ Quang Hiển - who was then the owner and special sponsor of 7 clubs in the V.League 1 and V.League 2. Previously, in 2018, Đoàn Nguyên Đức also said that the situation of one owner owning multiple teams would reduce the motivation to invest in Vietnamese football. Public opinion believes that in the 10 years from 2009 to 2019, only two consecutive championships in 2018 and 2019 were Hanoi FC clearly demonstrating their strength, thanks to a national team squad that sometimes reached 10 people; the remaining championships all had the "fingerprints" of the point-scoring relationships between Hanoi - Da Nang - Quang Nam - Saigon - Quang Ninh - Hong Linh Ha Tinh (which are the clubs of Bầu Hiển). The 2022 season also met with controversy due to public opinion that the championship of Hanoi was won partly due to referee decisions in favor of the purple team. In addition, Bầu Hiển caused controversy when personally went down to encourage and give money to his own teams in matches between each other. In 2012, after Xuan Thanh Saigon Cement failed to win the championship when they were held to a draw by Hanoi T&T in the final round, allowing SHB Da Nang to win, owner Nguyễn Đức Thụy announced that he would quit football because of too much injustice and oppression; in the 2013 season, he officially disbanded the team. FLC Group chairman Trịnh Văn Quyết, after withdrawing sponsorship from Thanh Hoa in 2018, also hinted that "you can't win when you only have one team".

The situation of one owner managing or owning multiple teams has become a problem that causes many fans to worry, especially about the transparency and fairness when these teams compete in the same league.

=== Match-fixing ===
In recent years, the phenomenon of "asking for points and giving points" and "accumulating points" to win or stay in the league had occurred. The formula of "3 away – 3 return" has become popular for teams in an alliance to maximize points for each other. Many matches have taken place with abnormal manifestations that have caused anger for fans because of the spirit of competition that is considered to be weak, not giving their all. The tournament organizer has also repeatedly issued sanctions, such as subtracting points from football teams in matches that are not active, but the situation of "giving points" still continues.

The People's Police newspaper noted that the problem of match-fixing is also related to the issue of "one owner, multiple teams". In 2017, the public raised many doubts when Hanoi, who were full of hope to win the championship, unexpectedly drew 4-4 with Than Quang Ninh in a match that the capital team had led by 2 goals. It is worth noting that this score was just enough for Quang Nam to win the championship for the first time. Statistics from the 2019 season show that Ho Chi Minh City only won 23% of points from SHB Da Nang, Saigon, Quang Nam and Quang Ninh, while Hanoi received 13 out of 15 maximum points before these teams. In the 2017 season, FLC Thanh Hóa lost 22 points to the "brotherhood" group while Quang Nam lost 9 points.

To monitor and control suspicious matches, VPF has previously partnered with Sportradar, a football betting control company, and then Genius Sports (headquartered in Singapore and with a global network) since the 2019 season. In a statement in the 2022 season, VPF had to ask the teams to play their best, not to give points to each other.

=== Refereeing ===
The refereeing issue has been going on in the tournament for many years and has caused a lot of resentment in the public. Many controversial decisions, even mistakes by referees, have eroded the trust of clubs and fans in the organizers, and the image of the tournament has also been affected. In a statement in the 2023 season, Vũ Tiến Thành, the coach of Ho Chi Minh City F.C., said that there is a group of referees who are manipulated, and some referees are making the image of the refereeing force worse. Thành also questioned the referee's ideology when working.

The referee assignment for the tournament has also been questioned. This has led to the disappointment of fans when some referees who do not meet the standards are often assigned to important matches. Some people even question whether the referees are "not biased then weak in terms of expertise" when there have been too many mistakes occurring continuously. One of the temporary solutions proposed to address this situation is to hire foreign referees to officiate some of the tournament matches.

Due to the continuous occurrence of refereeing errors, which have affected the results of matches, the need to equip VAR for V.League has become increasingly urgent to improve the quality of the tournament. From the end of 2022, VPF has begun to carry out the necessary procedures to soon implement VAR in V.League. VPF expects VAR to begin to be deployed on a trial basis from the second phase of the 2023 season, before being applied officially from the 2023-2024 season.

=== Conflict of interest related to sponsors ===
The V.League regulations typically stipulate that clubs are not allowed to exploit sponsorships since the date the league regulations are issued or when notified by the organizer. However, if the team already has a main sponsor that operates in the same industry as the league's main sponsor, their rights are still protected. The cases of Hoang Anh Gia Lai (HAGL) in 2018 with VPMilk and in 2022 with Red Bull are typical examples of this exception.

However, ahead of the 2023 season, when VPF announced to HAGL that the team's new sponsor (Carabao Corporation) was in conflict of interest with the league's main sponsor and requested the team not to use the images of the new sponsor within the scope of the tournament, controversy ensued. VPF's regulations were met with fierce backlash from fans who were accused of making it difficult for clubs, hindering the development of Vietnamese football. HAGL also said that VPF's decision was "completely unreasonable and did not create conditions for the club to develop", and threatened to withdraw from V.League if VPF did not allow them to advertise for the new sponsor.

=== Television rights ===
Television rights have been one of the most pressing issues in the top-tier club competition in Vietnam for many years. The first time V.League "sold" television rights was in the 2005 season. However, the value of the contract signed between VFF and the television stations at that time was not really significant. In order for a match to be broadcast live, VFF and the clubs had to pay a fee and even cover the cost of accommodation, travel, and allowances for the television station.

At the end of 2010, the V.League broadcasting rights were sold by VFF to An Vien Television (AVG) for 20 years, with a price of VND 6 billion for the first year and then a 10% annual increase. However, after the establishment of VPF, this company took back the V.League broadcasting rights contract from AVG and committed to exploiting at least VND 50 billion per year from the broadcasting rights. However, the deal fell through at the last minute after bầu Kiên was arrested.

In October 2022, VPF reached a television rights agreement with FPT Telecom for 5 seasons, from the 2023 season to the 2026–27 season. The agreement ensures that each year, FPT Telecom will pay 2.5 million USD for one season, 20 times higher than the previous contract, and on average, each club will receive several billion dong in television rights in one season.

== Teams ==
=== 2026–27 season ===
Locations of the 2026–27 V.League 1 teams

Fourteen clubs compete in V.League 1, with two coming from the V.League 2's previous season:

2026–27 club	Ward/Commune	Province/ Municipality	Stadium	Capacity	2025–26 position	V.League titles	Top division titles	Last title
Bac Ninh	Việt Yên	Bac Ninh	Việt Yên Stadium	18,000	2nd (VL2)	0	0	–
Cong An Hanoi^{a} ^{b}	Ô Chợ Dừa	Hanoi	Hàng Đẫy Stadium	25,000	1st	2	3	2025-26
Cong An Ho Chi Minh City^{a} ^{b}	Diên Hồng	Ho Chi Minh City	Thống Nhất Stadium	25,000	5th	1	4	2001–02
Dong A Thanh Hoa ^{b}	Hạc Thành	Thanh Hoa	Thanh Hóa Stadium	14,000	11th	0	0	–
Haiphong^{b}	Gia Viên	Hai Phong	Lạch Tray Stadium	32,000	7th	0	0	–
Hanoi^{b}	Ô Chợ Dừa	Hanoi	Hàng Đẫy Stadium	25,000	4th	6	6	2022
Hong Linh Ha Tinh^{b}	Thành Sen	Ha Tinh	Hà Tĩnh Stadium	22,000	8th	0	0	–
Ninh Binh	Hoa Lư	Ninh Binh	Ninh Bình Stadium	25,000	3rd	0	0	–
SHB Da Nang	Hòa Xuân	Da Nang	Chi Lăng Stadium	20,500	12th	1	3	2012
Song Lam Nghe An^{b}	Thành Vinh	Nghe An	Vinh Stadium	18,000	9th	2	2	2011
Truong Tuoi Dong Nai	Bình Phước	Dong Nai	Bình Phước Stadium	6,000	1st (VL2)	0	0	–
Thep Xanh Nam Đinh ^{b}	Nam Định	Ninh Binh	Thiên Trường Stadium	30,000	6th	2	3	2024–25
The Cong-Viettel	Từ Liêm	Hanoi	Mỹ Đình National Stadium	40,200	2nd	1	6	2020

^{a} Founding member of the V.League 1
^{b} Never been relegated from the V.League 1

=== Former clubs ===
Club	Location	Current league		
Becamex Ho Chi Minh	Location	Current league	Ho Chi Minh City	V.League 2
PVF-CAND	Hung Yen	V.League 2		
Tien Giang	Tien Giang	Defunct		
Hue	Hue	Second Division		
Hòa Phát Hà Nội	Hanoi	Defunct		
Navibank Sài Gòn	Ho Chi Minh City	Defunct		
Xuan Thanh Saigon	Ho Chi Minh City	Defunct		
Kiên Giang	Kien Giang	Defunct		
Vissai Ninh Bình	Ninh Binh	Defunct		
An Giang	An Giang	Third Division		
Dong Nai	Dong Nai	Defunct		
Dong Thap	Dong Thap	V.League 2		
Long An	Long An	V.League 2		
Can Tho	Can Tho	Defunct		
Than Quang Ninh	Quang Ninh	Defunct		
Saigon FC	Ho Chi Minh City	Defunct		
Khatoco Khanh Hoa	Khanh Hoa	V.League 2		
Quang Nam	Quang Nam	Defunct		
Quy Nhon United	Quy Nhon	V.League 2		

== Players ==
=== Rules on foreign players ===
The V.League policy on foreign players has changed multiple times since its inception.

From 2000–01 season to 2001–02 season: 5 foreign players and only 3 can be on the field at a time.

From 2003 season to 2004 season: 4 foreign players and only 3 can be on the field at a time.

From 2005 season to 2010 season: 5 foreign players and only 3 can be on the field at a time.

From 2011 season to 2012 season: 4 foreign players and only 3 can be on the field at a time.

From 2013 season to 2014 season: 3 foreign players. All 3 players can be on the field.

From 2015 season to 2018 season, the number of foreign players allowed for clubs was reduced to two players plus one naturalised player.

From 2019 season to 2023–24 season, the rules on foreign players changed again. The number of foreign players allowed for clubs are three players and one naturalised player.

In 2024–25 season, the rules on foreign players has been changed to allow two naturalised players.

From 2025–26 season, the rules on foreign players now allow 4 foreign players. Teams participate in any intercontentinal or sub-contentinal competition now allowed additional 3 players.

=== Top scorers by season ===
Season	Name	Club	Goals
1980	(Vietnam) Lê Văn Đặng	Công an Hà Nội	10
1981–82	(Vietnam) Võ Thành Sơn	Sở Công Nghiệp	15
1982–83	(Vietnam) Nguyễn Cao Cường	Thể Công	22
1984	(Vietnam) Nguyễn Văn Dũng	Nam Định	15
1985	(Vietnam) Nguyễn Văn Dũng	Nam Định	15
1986	(Vietnam) Nguyễn Văn Dũng (Vietnam) Nguyễn Minh Huy	Nam Định; Hải Quan	12
1987	(Vietnam) Lưu Tấn Liêm	Hải Quan	15
1989	(Vietnam) Hà Vương Ngầu Nại	Cảng Sài Gòn	10
1990	(Vietnam) Nguyễn Hồng Sơn	Thể Công	10
1991	(Vietnam) Hà Vương Ngầu Nại	Cảng Sài Gòn	10
1992	(Vietnam) Trần Minh Toàn	Quảng Nam-Đà Nẵng	6
1993–94	(Vietnam) Nguyễn Công Long (Vietnam) Bùi Sỹ Thành	Bình Định; Long An	12
1995	(Vietnam) Trần Minh Chiến	Công an Thành phố Hồ Chí Minh	14
1996	(Vietnam) Lê Huỳnh Đức	Công an Thành phố Hồ Chí Minh	25
1997	(Vietnam) Lê Huỳnh Đức	Công an Thành phố Hồ Chí Minh	16
1998	(Vietnam) Nguyễn Văn Dũng	Nam Định	17
1999; Unofficial	(Vietnam) Vũ Minh Hiếu	Công an Hà Nội	8
1999–2000	(Vietnam) Văn Sỹ Thủy	Sông Lam Nghệ An	14
2000–01	(Vietnam) Đặng Đạo	Khánh Hòa	11
2001–02	(Vietnam) Hồ Văn Lợi	Cảng Sài Gòn	9
2003	(Nigeria) Emeka Achilefu	Nam Định	11
2004	(Nigeria) Amaobi Uzowuru	Nam Định	15
2005	(Brazil) Kesley Alves	Becamex Bình Dương	21
2006	(Brazil) Elenildo de Jesus	Thép Miền Nam Cảng Sài Gòn	18
2007	(Brazil) José Almeida	SHB Đà Nẵng	16
2008	(Brazil) José Almeida	SHB Đà Nẵng	23
2009	(Argentina) Gastón Merlo (Brazil) Lázaro	SHB Đà Nẵng; Quân khu 4	15
2010	(Argentina) Gastón Merlo	SHB Đà Nẵng	19
2011	(Argentina) Gastón Merlo	SHB Đà Nẵng	22
2012	(Nigeria) Timothy Anjembe	Hà Nội ACB	17
2013	(Argentina) Gonzalo Marronkle (Nigeria) Samson Olaleye (Note: Player got naturalized to become a Vietnamese citizen in October 2013, changing his name from Samson Olaleye to Hoàng Vũ Samson)	Hà Nội T&T	14
2014	(Nigeria) Samson Olaleye	Hà Nội T&T	23
2015	(Democratic Republic of the Congo) Patiyo Tambwe	QNK Quảng Nam	18
2016	(Argentina) Gastón Merlo	SHB Đà Nẵng	24
2017	(Vietnam) Nguyễn Anh Đức	Becamex Bình Dương	17
2018	(Nigeria) Oseni Ganiyu	Hà Nội	17
2019	(Senegal) Pape Omar Faye (Brazil) Bruno Cantanhede	Hà Nội; Viettel	15
2020	(Jamaica) Rimario Gordon (Brazil) Pedro Paulo	Hà Nội; Sài Gòn	12
2022	(Jamaica) Rimario Gordon	Hải Phòng	17
2023	(Brazil) Rafaelson	Topenland Bình Định	16
2023–24	(Brazil) Rafaelson	Thép Xanh Nam Định	31
2024–25	(Brazil) Lucão do Break (Brazil) Alan Grafite	Hải Phòng; Công An Hà Nội	14
2025–26	(Brazil) Alan Grafite	Công An Hà Nội	16

== Awards ==
The V.League Awards is an award given annually by the Vietnam Professional Football Jointstock Company for the best players, head coaches, and referees of the league. Since 2012, the awards are given in a ceremony at the end of the league season.

== Statistics ==
=== List of champions ===
The following is a historical list of champions and runners-up of the V.League 1 by season. Superscripts in brackets (such as ^{(2)}) indicate a repeat win.

Season	Champion	Runner-up	Third place
National A1 League
1980	Tổng Cục Đường Sắt	Công An Hà Nội	Hải Quan
1981–82	Quân Đội ^{(1)}	Quân Khu Thủ Đô	Công An Hà Nội
1982–83	Quân Đội ^{(2)}	Hải Quan	Cảng Hải Phòng
1984	Công An Hà Nội	Quân Đội	Sở Công Nghiệp TP.HCM
1985	Công Nghiệp Hà Nam Ninh	Sở Công Nghiệp TP.HCM	Quân Đội
1986	Cảng Sài Gòn	Quân Đội	Hải Quan
1987	Quân Đội ^{(3)}	Quảng Nam-Đà Nẵng	An Giang
1989	Đồng Tháp	Quân Đội	Công An Hà Nội
National Elite League
1990	Quân Đội ^{(4)}	Quảng Nam-Đà Nẵng	An Giang
1991	Hải Quan	Quảng Nam-Đà Nẵng	Cảng Sài Gòn & Công An Hải Phòng
1992	Quảng Nam-Đà Nẵng	Công An Hải Phòng	Quân Đội & Sông Lam Nghê Tĩnh
1993–94	Cảng Sài Gòn ^{(2)}	Công An TP.HCM	Long An & Quân Đội
1995	Công An TP.HCM	Thừa Thiên Huế	Cảng Sài Gòn
1996	Đồng Tháp ^{(2)}	Công An TP.HCM	Sông Lam Nghệ An
National First Division
1997	Cảng Sài Gòn ^{(3)}	Sông Lam Nghệ An	Lâm Đồng
1998	Thể Công ^{(5)}	Sông Lam Nghệ An	Công An TP.HCM
1999–2000	Sông Lam Nghệ An	Công An TP.HCM	Công An Hà Nội
V-League
2000–01	Sông Lam Nghệ An ^{(2)}	Nam Định	Thể Công
2001–02	Cảng Sài Gòn ^{(4)}	Công An TP.HCM	Sông Lam Nghệ An
2003	Hoàng Anh Gia Lai	Gạch Đồng Tâm Long An	Nam Định
2004	Hoàng Anh Gia Lai ^{(2)}	Sông Đà Nam Định	Gạch Đồng Tâm Long An
2005	Gạch Đồng Tâm Long An	SHB Đà Nẵng	Bình Dương
2006	Gạch Đồng Tâm Long An ^{(2)}	Bình Dương	Bình Định
2007	Bình Dương	Đồng Tâm Long An	Hoàng Anh Gia Lai
2008	Becamex Bình Dương ^{(2)}	Đồng Tâm Long An	Xi Măng Hải Phòng
2009	SHB Đà Nẵng ^{(2)}	Becamex Bình Dương	Sông Lam Nghệ An
2010	Hà Nội T&T	Vicem Hải Phòng	TĐCS Đồng Tháp
2011	Sông Lam Nghệ An ^{(3)}	Hà Nội T&T	SHB Đà Nẵng
Super League
2012	SHB Đà Nẵng ^{(3)}	Hà Nội T&T	Sài Gòn Xuân Thành
V.League 1
2013	Hà Nội T&T ^{(2)}	Hoàng Anh Gia Lai	SHB Đà Nẵng
2014	Becamex Bình Dương ^{(3)}	Hà Nội T&T	FLC Thanh Hóa
2015	Becamex Bình Dương ^{(4)}	Hà Nội T&T	FLC Thanh Hóa
2016	Hà Nội T&T ^{(3)}	Hải Phòng	SHB Đà Nẵng
2017	Quảng Nam	FLC Thanh Hóa	Hà Nội
2018	Hà Nội ^{(4)}	Thanh Hóa	Sanna Khánh Hòa BVN
2019	Hà Nội ^{(5)}	TP.Hồ Chí Minh	Than Quảng Ninh
2020	Viettel ^{(6)}	Hà Nội	Sài Gòn
2021	Competition abandoned due to COVID-19 pandemic		
2022	Hà Nội ^{(6)}	Hải Phòng	Topenland Bình Định
2023	Công An Hà Nội ^{(2)}	Hà Nội	Viettel
2023–24	Thép Xanh Nam Định ^{(2)}	MerryLand Quy Nhơn Bình Định	Hà Nội
2024–25	Thép Xanh Nam Định ^{(3)}	Hà Nội	Công An Hà Nội
2025–26	Công An Hà Nội ^{(3)}	Thể Công–Viettel	Ninh Bình

=== Titles by club ===
Club	Winners	Runners-up	Winning seasons
Hà Nội	6	7	2010, 2013, 2016, 2018, 2019, 2022
Thể Công-Viettel	6	4	1981–82, 1982–83, 1987, 1990, 1998, 2020
Becamex Bình Dương	4	2	2007, 2008, 2014, 2015
Hồ Chí Minh City	4	1	1986, 1993–94, 1997, 2001–02
SHB Đà Nẵng	3	4	1992, 2009, 2012
Sông Lam Nghệ An	3	3	1999–2000, 2000–01, 2011
Nam Định	3	2	1985, 2023–24, 2024–25
Công An Hà Nội	3	1	1984, 2023, 2025–26
Long An	2	3	2005, 2006
Hoàng Anh Gia Lai	2	2	2003, 2004
Đồng Tháp	2	0	1989, 1996
Công An Thành phố Hồ Chí Minh	1	4	1995
Hải Quan	1	2	1991
Tổng cục Đường sắt	1	0	1980
Quảng Nam	1	0	2017

=== Seasons ===
The rankings of the V.League 1 teams in the 1980-1996 seasons are not official, because those seasons have not been organized in a round-robin format but are divided into several stages. In these seasons, the ranking of each team is arranged as follows:
1. Any team that enters the next stage is ranked above the teams that only stopped at the previous stage.
2. In the same period of any season, the rankings of the teams are arranged according to the rules and regulations of that season.

From the 1997 season, the rankings of the teams are official.

As there is no record of the group stage results for the 1990 and 1992 seasons, the rankings of some of the teams in these two seasons are uncertain.

Position
Champion
Runner-up
Third place
Exceptional clubs
The team drops out or is eliminated
The team buys and sells relegation spots
Relegation
Relegated by two levels

Season	80	81/2	82/3	84	85	86	87/88	89	90	91	92	93/4	95	96	97	98	99/0	00/1	01/2	03	04	05	06	07	08	09	10	11	12	13	14	15	16	17	18	19	20	21	22	23	23/24	24/25	25/26
Team	17	17	17	18	18	20	27	32	18	19	18	16	14	12	12	14	14	10	10	12	12	12	13	14	14	14	14	14	14	12	13	14	14	14	14	14	14	14	13	14	14	14	14
Viettel		1	1	2	3	2	1	2	1	9	3	3	9	10	4	1	10	3	7	6	11				8	9										6	1		4	3	5	4	
Hà Nội																										4	1	2	2	1	2	2	1	3	1	1	2		1	2	3	2	
Bình Dương												12	11			13					6	3	2	1	1	2	8	6	6	8	1	1	10	11	7	4	6		7	12	8	7	
Ho Chi Minh City FC	6	13	4	11	5	1	6	6	5-8	4	9-14	1	3	8	1	5	4	4	1	11		8	10	8	5	13								12	12	2	5		9	13	4	10	
Đà Nẵng				13	15	8	2	18	2	2	1	7	14				11		6	10	9	2	7	5	4	1	6	3	1	2	4	9	3	9	9	10	9		10	14		13	
Sông Lam Nghệ An						17	21	17	15-17	15	4	10	8	3	2	2	1	1	2	5	4	5	5	7	9	3	9	1	4	4	5	7	9	8	4	7	10		5	9	12	12	
Hoàng Anh Gia Lai																				1	1	4	4	3	7	6	7	9	5	3	9	13	12	10	10	8	7		6	10	11	9	
Thep Xanh Nam Định			13	5	1	5	17									10	6	2	5	3	2	6	9	4	11	12	14								13	11	13		12	5	1	1	
Hải Phòng						15	11	13	9-14	3	2	13			8	8	8	6	10		10	7	12		3	7	2	12	14	6	10	6	2	7	6	12	12		2	6	7	6	
Dong A Thanh Hóa																								9	10	14	12	7	11	5	3	3	6	2	2	13	11		8	4	9	8	
Quy Nhơn Bình Định	10	14	9	9	11	13	9	15	9-14	10	9-14	5	13			14			4	4	7	10	3	6	12														3	7	2	14	
Than Quảng Ninh		5	11	14	13	7	16	22		18																					6	4	4	4	5	3	4						
Sài Gòn																																	7	5	8	5	3		13				
Hà Tĩnh																																					8		11	8			
Quảng Nam																															8	8	5	1	11	9	14				10	11	
Khánh Hòa	14	12	12	16	14	12	4	21			15-18		5	5	9	9	9	10					6	10	6	8	4	11	12			5	8	6	3	14			11		14		
Cần Thơ														11																		11	11	13	14								
Long An							26	5	5-8	16	9-14	4	12			12	12			2	3	1	1	2	2	10	5	13		9	11	10	13	14									
An Giang	15		15	17			3	8	3	5	9-14	9	4	6	11																12												
Huế													2	12			7	8	9					13																			
Đồng Tháp	16							1	5-8	13	5	8	6	1	7	7	5	9		7	8	12		14		5	3	5	13			12	14										
Đồng Nai								19																						7	7	14											
Tiền Giang	17						18	14	15-17	8	8	14											13																				
Lâm Đồng					9	10	5	16	9-14	14	9-14	11	7	4	3	6	13																										
Vĩnh Long															12		14																										
Vissai Ninh Bình						6	12	20		6	6	2	1	2	5	3	2	5	3	9	12						11	4	8	10	13												
Ninh Bình																																											
Kiên Giang																													10	11													
Sài Gòn Xuân Thành																													3	12													
Navibank Sài Gòn																										11	13	8	7														
Hà Nội ACB	1	10	5	4	18		22	11	5-8	12	9-14	15								12	5	11	8	11	13			14	9														
Hòa Phát Hà Nội																						9	11	12	14		10	10															
Cong An Hanoi	2	3	14	1	4	14	10	3	9-14	11	15-18			9	10	4	3	7	8	8																				1	6	3	
Hải Quan	3	8	2	10	6	3	8	10	4	1	7	6	10	7	6	11																											
Công an Thanh Hóa						18	23	9	9-14	17		16																															
Dệt Nam Định				18			14	7	18		15-18																																
Quân khu 5											15-18																																
Điện Hải Phòng							24	4	9-14	7																																	
Thanh niên Hà Nội										19																																	
CN Xây dựng Hà Nội		15	6	8	17		13	12	15-17																																		
Công an Hà Bắc								23																																			
Cảng Hải Phòng	9	11	3	7	7	11	20	24																																			
Quân khu 3	4	6	16	12	8	20	25	25																																			
CA Quảng Nam Đà Nẵng							19	26																																			
Quân khu Thủ đô	7	2	10	15	10	16	15	27																																			
Quân khu 7								28																																			
Gò Dầu								29																																			
Hải Hưng								30																																			
Vĩnh Phú								31																																			
Sở Công nghiệp TPHCM	8	4	7	3	2	4	7	32																																			
Phòng không Không quân	5	7	8	6	12	9	27																																				
Công nghiệp Thực phẩm	11	16			16	19																																					
Tây Ninh	13	9	17																																								
CN Xây Dựng Hải Phòng	12	17																																									

Key
Currently in the V.League 1
Currently in the V.League 2
Currently in the Second Division
Dissolved

== All-time table ==
Figures as of 1 August 2025, primary source: http://www.rsssf.com/tablesv/vietchamp.html

This is the following is a V.League 1 table of statistics of seasons, number of matches and results of each team in all 38 national championship football seasons.

Match figures and match results excluding the 2021 season have not been completed and the seasons are not recorded, namely the 1990 and 1992 group stages; second round of the 1995 season; two games in the group stage of the 1996 season.

The total number of matches recorded is 5236 of which there are 3,824 wins and losses and 1412 draws. The total number of goals is 13783, the average number of goals in a match is: 2.63.

=== Detailed results ===
Key

Currently in the V.League 1
Founding members currently in the V.League 1
Founding members of the V.League 1

Rank	Club	Years	Seasons	Matches played	Win	Draw	Lost	Goals For	Goals Against	Points
1	Sông Lam Nghệ An	Sông Lam Nghệ Tĩnh (1986–1991) Sông Lam Nghệ An (1992–2003) Pjico Sông Lam Nghệ An (2004–2006) Tài chính Dầu khí Sông Lam Nghệ An (2007–2008) Sông Lam Nghệ An (2009–2022)	37	725	286	216	223	995	829	1074
2	Đà Nẵng	Quảng Nam-Đà Nẵng (1984–1995) Đà Nẵng (1999/00, 2001/02-2007) SHB Đà Nẵng (2008–2022)	33	628	248	172	208	882	775	916
3	Cong An Ho Chi Minh City	Cảng Sài Gòn (1980–2003) Thép Miền Nam Cảng Sài Gòn (2005–2008) Ho Chi Minh City (2009, 2017–2022) Cong An Ho Chi Minh City (2025–)	32	600	231	155	196	803	723	848
4	Hải Phòng	Công an Hải Phòng (1986-1993/94, 1997-2001/02) Thép Việt-Úc Hải Phòng (2004) Mitsustar Hải Phòng (2005) Mitsustar Haier Hải Phòng (2006) Xi măng Hải Phòng (2008–2010) Vicem Hải Phòng (2011–2012) Xi măng Vicem Hải Phòng (2013) Hải Phòng (2014–2022)	31	609	219	152	238	772	814	809
5	Viettel	CLB Quân đội (1981/82-1998) Thể Công (1999/00-2004) Thể Công-Viettel (2008 ^{vòng 1–19}) Thể Công (2008 ^{vòng 20–26} −2009) Viettel (2019–2022)	27	485	222	123	140	640	507	787
6	Khánh Hòa	Phú Khánh (1980–1989) Khánh Hòa (1992, 1995-2000/01) Khatoco Khánh Hòa (2006–2012) Sanna Khánh Hòa BVN (2015–2019)	28	572	203	147	222	679	739	756
7	Ho Chi Minh City	Sông Bé (1993/94-1995) Bình Dương (1998, 2004–2006) Becamex Binh Duong|Becamex Bình Dương (2007–2025) Becamex Ho Chi Minh City	23	503	198	142	163	752	645	736
8	Hà Nội	T&T Hà Nội (2009) Hà Nội T&T (2009-2016) Hanoi FC (2017–2021)	16	362	207	87	68	686	398	708
9	Hoàng Anh Gia Lai	Hoàng Anh Gia Lai (2003–)	22	504	190	125	189	741	728	695
10	Nam Định	Công nghiệp Hà Nam Ninh (1982/83-1987) Nam Định (1998–2003;2018;2021-2022) Sông Đà Nam Định (2004–2005) Gạch men Mikado Nam Định (2006;2009) Đạm Phú Mỹ Nam Định (2007–2008) Megastar Nam Định (2010) Dược Nam Hà Nam Định (2019-2020) Thép Xanh Nam Định (2023–)	23	472	167	120	185	551	611	621
11	Long An	Long An (1987–1995, 1998-1999/00) Gạch Đồng Tâm Long An (2003–2006) Đồng Tâm Long An (2007–2011, 2013–2015) Long An (2016–2017)	23	456	158	113	185	647	711	587
12	Đồng Tháp	Đồng Tháp (1980, 1989-2000/01, 2003) Delta Đồng Tháp (2004–2005) Đồng Tháp (2007) Tập đoàn Cao su Đồng Tháp (2009–2012) Đồng Tháp (2015–2016)	22	423	136	114	173	495	588	522
13	Vissai Ninh Bình	Công an TP. Hồ Chí Minh (1986–1989, 1991-2001/02 ^{vòng 1–11}) Ngân hàng Đông Á (2001/02 ^{vòng 12–18} -2003) Ngân hàng Đông Á Thép Pomina (2004) Xi măng The Vissai Ninh Bình (2010–2014)	21	364	140	89	135	523	480	509
14	Thanh Hóa	Halida Thanh Hóa (2007–2008 ^{vòng 1–13}) Xi măng Công Thanh-Thanh Hóa (2008 ^{vòng 14–26} – 2009 ^{vòng 1–17}) Thanh Hóa (2009 ^{vòng 18–26}) Lam Sơn Thanh Hóa (2010) Thanh Hóa (2011–2015 ^{vòng 1–12}) FLC Thanh Hóa (2015 ^{vòng 13–26} – 2018) Thanh Hóa (2019–2020) Đông Á Thanh Hóa (2021)	16	366	138	100	128	527	560	514
15	Công An Hà Nội	Công an Hà Nội (1980–1992, 1996-2001/02) Hàng không Việt Nam (2003)	19	310	124	95	91	405	333	467
16	Bình Định	Công nhân Nghĩa Bình (1980–1989) Bình Định (1990–1995, 1998, 2001/02-2004) Hoa Lâm Bình Định (2005) Pisico Bình Định (2006–2007) Boss Bình Định (2008) Topenland Bình Định (2021) Quy Nhơn Bình Định (2023)	25	333	104	93	136	354	443	405
17	Than Quảng Ninh	Than Quảng Ninh (1981/82-1989) Công nhân Quảng Ninh (1991) Than Quảng Ninh (2014–2021)	17	281	108	80	93	389	346	404
18	Hải Quan	Hải Quan (1980–1998)	16	241	108	57	76	335	267	381
19	Hà Nội ACB	Tổng cục Đường sắt (1980–1985, 1987–1989) Đường sắt Việt Nam (1990-1993/94) LG ACB (2003) LG Hà Nội ACB (2004–2006 ^{vòng 1–13}) Hà Nội ACB (2006 ^{vòng 14–24}-2008, 2011) CLB Bóng đá Hà Nội (2012)	19	323	94	89	140	376	467	371
20	Lâm Đồng	Lâm Đồng (1985-1999/00)	13	192	72	40	80	234	261	256
21	Quảng Nam	QNK Quảng Nam (2014–2016) Quảng Nam (2017–2020)	7	170	60	54	56	282	283	234
22	An Giang	An Giang (1980, 1982/83-1984, 1987–1997) Hùng Vương An Giang (2014)	13	176	65	38	73	210	239	233
23	Sở Công nghiệp TP. Hồ Chí Minh	Sở Công nghiệp Thành phố Hồ Chí Minh (1980–1989)	8	130	53	39	38	176	168	198
24	Sài Gòn	CLB Hà Nội (2016 ^{vòng 1–5}) CLB Sài Gòn (2016 ^{vòng 6–26} – 2021)	6	124	48	36	40	179	162	180
25	Hòa Phát Hà Nội	Hòa Phát Hà Nội (2005–2008, 2010–2011)	6	150	41	42	67	185	239	165
26	Cảng Hải Phòng	Cảng Hải Phòng (1980–1989)	8	115	34	44	37	122	123	146
27	Huế	Thừa Thiên-Huế (1995–1996, 1999/00-2001/02) Huda Huế (2007)	6	121	34	30	57	121	166	132
28	Quân khu Thủ đô	Quân khu Thủ đô (1980–1989)	8	105	30	37	38	109	120	127
29	Navibank Sài Gòn	Quân khu 4 (2009) Navibank Sài Gòn (2010–2012)	4	104	31	29	44	125	151	122
30	Quân khu 3	Quân khu 3 (1980–1989)	8	110	28	37	45	101	129	121
31	Cần Thơ	Cần Thơ (1996) Xổ số Kiến thiết Cần Thơ (2015–2018)	5	126	27	39	60	146	208	120
32	Phòng không Không quân	Phòng không Không quân (1980–1987)	7	104	29	33	42	110	152	120
33	Công nhân Xây dựng Hà Nội	Công nhân Xây dựng Hà Nội (1981/82-1985, 1987–1990)	7	96	28	33	35	93	108	117
34	Đồng Nai	Đồng Nai (1989, 2013–2015)	4	83	23	19	41	117	143	88
35	Tiền Giang	Tiền Giang (1980, 1987-1993/94) Thép Pomina Tiền Giang (2006)	8	88	19	24	45	76	125	81
36	Điện Hải Phòng	Điện Hải Phòng (1987–1991)	4	47	14	18	15	36	41	60
37	Dệt Nam Định	Dệt Nam Định (1984, 1987–1990, 1992)	5	43	15	13	15	50	55	58
38	Công nghiệp Thực phẩm	Công nghiệp Thực phẩm (1980); Lương thực Thực phẩm (1981/82); Công nghiệp Thực phẩm (1985–1986)	4	53	12	18	23	62	74	54
39	Công an Thanh Hóa	Công an Thanh Hóa (1986–1991, 1993/94)	6	63	13	13	37	58	104	52
40	Kiên Giang	Kienlongbank Kiên Giang (2012–2013)	2	46	12	10	24	54	91	46
41	Sài Gòn Xuân Thành	CLB Bóng đá Sài Gòn (2012 ^{vòng 1–17}) Sài Gòn Xuân Thành (2012 ^{vòng 18–26}) Xi măng Xuân Thành Sài Gòn (2013)	2	26	12	10	4	43	23	46
42	Tây Ninh	Tây Ninh (1980-1982/83)	3	43	8	12	23	41	71	36
43	Công an Quảng Nam-Đà Nẵng	Công an Quảng Nam-Đà Nẵng (1987–1989)	2	26	6	12	8	25	30	30
44	Công nhân Xây dựng Hải Phòng	Công nhân Xây dựng Hải Phòng (1980-1981/82)	2	22	6	6	10	13	22	24
45	Vĩnh Long	Vĩnh Long (1997, 1999/00)	2	22	3	12	7	18	26	21
46	Hà Tĩnh	Hồng Lĩnh Hà Tĩnh (2020–2021)	2	20	4	8	8	19	24	20
47	Công an Hà Bắc	Công an Hà Bắc (1989)	1	10	3	3	4	11	11	12
48	Quân khu 7	Quân khu 7 (1989)	1	10	2	3	5	10	14	9
49	Gò Dầu	Gò Dầu (1989)	1	10	2	1	7	5	15	7
50	Thanh niên Hà Nội	Thanh niên Hà Nội (1991)	1	10	1	2	7	5	14	5
51	Hải Hưng	Hải Hưng (1989)	1	10	0	3	7	1	20	3
52	Vĩnh Phú	Công nghiệp Việt Trì Vĩnh Phú (1989)	1	10	0	2	8	7	24	2
53	Quân khu 5	Quân khu 5 (1992)	1	0	0	0	0	0	0	0
54	Ninh Bình	N/A	0	0	0	0	0	0	0	0

=== Top-performing clubs ===
No. of championships	Clubs
6	**The Cong-Viettel**, **Hanoi**
4	**Becamex Ho Chi Minh City**, **Cong An Ho Chi Minh City**
3	**SHB Da Nang**, **Sông Lam Nghệ An**, **Thep Xanh Nam Dinh**
2	**Hoàng Anh Gia Lai**, Long An, Đồng Tháp, **Công an Hà Nội**
1	Hải Quan, Tổng cục Đường sắt, Cong An Ho Chi Minh City (1978), **Quảng Nam**

Boldface indicates clubs playing in 2025–26 season

=== All-time appearances ===
Top ten players with most appearances
Player		Period	Club(s)	Games
1	(Vietnam) Lê Tấn Tài	2003–2022	Sanna Khánh Hòa BVN 217, Hải Phòng 11, Becamex Bình Dương 155, Hồng Lĩnh Hà Tĩnh 6, Hà Nội 16, Khánh Hoà 19	434
2	(Vietnam) Nguyễn Thế Anh	1965–1984	Thể Công 412	412
3	(Vietnam) Nguyễn Hồng Sơn	1988–2005	Thể Công 401	430
4	(Vietnam) Đặng Phương Nam	1992–2007	Thể Công 388	388
5	(Vietnam) Phan Văn Tài Em	2002–2011	Long An 305, Navibank Sài Gòn 44, Xuân Thành Sài Gòn 27	376
6	(Vietnam) Nguyễn Anh Đức	2006–2022	Đông Á Bank 9, Becamex Bình Dương 355, Hoàng Anh Gia Lai 3, Long An 5	367
7	(Vietnam) Nguyễn Cao Cường	1973–1990	Thể Công 332	332
8	(Vietnam) Phạm Thành Lương	2005–2023	Hà Nội ACB 144, Hà Nội 186	330
–	(Vietnam) **Nguyễn Văn Quyết**	2011–present	Hà Nội 330	330
9	(Vietnam) Dương Hồng Sơn	1998–2015	Sông Lam Nghệ An 206, Hà Nội 95	301
11	(Vietnam) Nguyễn Minh Phương	1998–2015	Cảng Sài Gòn 95, Long An 171, SHB Đà Nẵng 38,	294
–	(Vietnam) Nguyễn Minh Châu	2003–2017	Hải Phòng 294	294

Boldface indicates a player still active in the V.League 1.

=== All-time top scorers ===
Player		Period	Clubs (mostly known as)	Goals
1	(Nigeria) Samson Olaleye	2009–2026	Đồng Tháp, Hà Nội, Quảng Nam, Thanh Hóa, Hồ Chí Minh City, PVF-CAND	209
2	(Argentina) Gastón Merlo	2009–2023	SHB Đà Nẵng, Nam Định, Sài Gòn	157
3	(Vietnam) Nguyễn Văn Dũng	1983–1999	Nam Định, Sông Lam Nghệ An, Thanh Hóa	130
4	(Vietnam) Nguyễn Anh Đức	2006–2022	Đông Á Bank, Becamex Bình Dương, Hoàng Anh Gia Lai, Long An	127
5	(Vietnam) Nguyễn Cao Cường	1973–1990	Thể Công	127
6	(Vietnam) **Nguyễn Văn Quyết**	2011–present	Hà Nội	125
7	(Vietnam) Lê Công Vinh	2004–2016	Sông Lam Nghệ An, Hà Nội T&T, Hà Nội ACB, Becamex Bình Dương	116
8	(Vietnam) Huỳnh Kesley Alves	2003–2019	Becamex Bình Dương, Hoàng Anh Gia Lai, Sài Gòn Xuân Thành, Sanna Khánh Hòa BVN, Hồ Chí Minh City	113
9	(Brazil) Antônio Carlos	2003–2015	Long An	94
10	(Argentina) Gonzalo Marronkle	2009–2017	Hà Nội	81

Boldface indicates a player still active in the V.League 1.

== See also ==
- Vietnam Football Federation
- Football in Vietnam
- North Vietnam Football Championship and South Vietnam Football Championship – Before 1980
- List of football clubs in Vietnam
- List of top-division football clubs in AFC countries
- List of association football competitions
