= 1997 V-League =

Vietnamese National First Division
- Season: 1997
- Dates: 9 March – 16 November
- Champions: Cảng Sài Gòn (3rd title)
- Relegated: An Giang; Vĩnh Long
- Asian Club Championship: Cảng Sài Gòn
- Asian Cup Winners' Cup: Hải Quan
- Matches: 132
- Goals: 314 (2.38 per match)
- Top goalscorer: Lê Huỳnh Đức (16 goals)

The 1997 Vietnamese National First Division was the 15th season of the National Football Championship in Vietnam, played from 9 March until 16 November 1997.

Starting from this season, the league name was changed from National Elite Football Championship to National First Division.

== Standings ==
Pos	Team	Pld	W	D	L	GF	GA	GD	Pts	Qualification or relegation
1	Cảng Sài Gòn (C)	22	12	4	6	22	15	+7	40	Qualification for Asian Club Championship
2	Sông Lam Nghệ An	22	11	3	8	28	17	+11	36	
3	Lâm Đồng	22	11	2	9	26	25	+1	35	
4	Thể Công	22	8	8	6	28	21	+7	32	
5	Công An TP.HCM	22	8	7	7	36	31	+5	31	
6	Hải Quan	22	9	4	9	24	21	+3	31	Qualification for Asian Cup Winners' Cup
7	Đồng Tháp	22	8	6	8	19	21	−2	30	
8	Công An Hải Phòng	22	9	2	11	38	38	0	29	
9	Khánh Hòa	22	8	4	10	20	23	−3	28	
10	Công An Hà Nội	22	8	4	10	32	38	−6	28	
11	An Giang	22	7	4	11	25	40	−15	25	Relegation to Second Division
12	Vĩnh Long	22	3	12	7	18	26	−8	21	Relegation to Second Division

Source: VFF
(C) Champions

Vietnam National Elite Football Championship
Champions

3rd title
