= Peter Omoduemuke =

Nigerian footballer

Personal information
- Full name: Peter Oghenebrorhien Omoduemuke
- Date of birth: 9 June 1984 (age 42)
- Place of birth: Ughelli, Nigeria
- Height: 1.80 m (5 ft 11 in)
- Position: Midfielder

Senior career*
Years	Team	Apps	(Gls)
2001–2002	Livorno	0	(0)
2001	→ Alessandria (loan)	0	(0)
2003	Massese	8	(1)
2003–2004	Vigevano	30	(3)
2005–2006	Partizan	0	(0)
2005	→ Teleoptik (loan)		
2006	→ Obilić (loan)	9	(0)
2007	Politehnica Timișoara	10	(0)
2008	Ceahlăul Piatra Neamț	12	(0)
2009–2010	Minerul Lupeni	5	(3)
2013	Ninh Bình	21	(0)
2014	Than Quảng Ninh	22	(3)
2015	Đồng Nai	11	(1)
2017–2018	Churchill Brothers	7	(1)
- * Club domestic league appearances and goals as of 8 March 2019

Peter Oghenebrorhien Omoduemuke (born 9 June 1984) is a Nigerian professional footballer who plays as a midfielder.

== Career ==
As a teenager, Omoduemuke moved to Italy and signed with Livorno. He subsequently joined Alessandria in 2001, before returning to Livorno in 2002. Afterwards, Omoduemuke also played for Massese, as well as Vigevano. He later moved to Serbia and Montenegro and joined Partizan, but was immediately loaned to affiliate side Teleoptik. In September 2005, Omoduemuke broke Vladimir Vukajlović's leg with a tackle during a training session. He was then sent on loan to top-flight club Obilić in early 2006.

In late 2006, Omoduemuke moved to Romania for a trial at Politehnica Timișoara. He later signed with the club, helping the side reach the 2007 Cupa României Final. Over the next few years, Omoduemuke also played for Ceahlăul Piatra Neamț and Minerul Lupeni.

Between 2013 and 2015, Omoduemuke played for Vietnamese clubs Ninh Bình, Than Quảng Ninh, and Đồng Nai. In 2017, he joined Indian I-League club Churchill Brothers.

== Honours ==
Politehnica Timișoara

- Cupa României: Runner-up 2006–07

Ninh Bình

- Vietnamese Cup: 2013
