= 1982–83 V-League =

Vietnam National A1 League
- Season: 1982–1983
- Dates: 19 December 1982 – 1 May 1983
- Champions: Quân Đội (2nd title)
- Relegated: Tây Ninh
- Matches: 155
- Goals: 335 (2.16 per match)
- Top goalscorer: Nguyễn Cao Cường (22 goals)

The 1982–83 Vietnam National A1 League was the 3rd season of the National Football Championship in Vietnam, played from December 1982 until May 1982.

17 teams took part in the competition that was played in three stages; a Group stage featuring 2 groups of 9 and 8 teams of which the top four qualified for stage two. The group winners of stage 2 would meet in the final.

The bottom two placed teams from the first stage would meet in an end of season relegation match.

== First stage ==
=== Group A ===
Pos	Team	Pld	W	D	L	GF	GA	GD	Pts	Qualification
1	Tổng Cục Đường Sắt	14	4	8	2	13	9	+4	16	Qualify for 2nd stage
2	CNXD Hà Nội	14	5	6	3	13	10	+3	16	Qualify for 2nd stage
3	Cảng Hải Phòng	14	6	4	4	15	14	+1	16	Qualify for 2nd stage
4	Phòng Không	14	4	7	3	16	14	+2	15	Qualify for 2nd stage
5	Quân Khu Thủ Đô	14	4	6	4	11	12	−1	14	
6	Công Nghiệp Hà Nam Ninh	14	3	6	5	12	13	−1	12	
7	Công An Hà Nội	14	2	8	4	13	16	−3	12	
8	Quân Khu 3	14	2	7	5	8	13	−5	11	Relegation Playoff

Source: VFF

=== Group B ===
Pos	Team	Pld	W	D	L	GF	GA	GD	Pts	Qualification
1	Quân Đội	16	12	2	2	32	13	+19	26	Qualify for 2nd stage
2	Hải Quan	16	7	7	2	27	17	+10	21	Qualify for 2nd stage
3	Cảng Sài Gòn	16	6	8	2	20	12	+8	20	Qualify for 2nd stage
4	Sở Công Nghiệp TP.HCM	16	6	8	2	21	14	+7	20	Qualify for 2nd stage
5	Công Nhân Nghĩa Bình	16	6	4	6	13	15	−2	16	
6	Than Quảng Ninh	16	4	5	7	13	16	−3	13	
7	Phú Khánh	16	4	5	7	15	20	−5	13	
8	An Giang	16	3	4	9	9	19	−10	10	
9	Tây Ninh	16	2	1	13	14	38	−24	5	Relegation Playoff

Source: VFF

== Second stage ==
=== Group A ===
Pos	Team	Pld	W	D	L	GF	GA	GD	Pts	Qualification
1	Hải Quan	6	3	2	1	14	7	+7	8	Qualify for final
2	Cảng Hải Phòng	6	2	2	2	7	5	+2	6	
3	Tổng Cục Đường Sắt	6	2	2	2	8	7	+1	6	
4	Sở Công Nghiệp TP.HCM	6	1	2	3	10	20	−10	4	

Source: VFF

=== Group B ===
Pos	Team	Pld	W	D	L	GF	GA	GD	Pts	Qualification
1	Quân Đội	6	4	1	1	15	7	+8	9	Qualify for final
2	Cảng Sài Gòn	6	4	1	1	11	5	+6	9	
3	CNXD Hà Nội	6	1	2	3	7	12	−5	4	
4	Phòng Không	6	1	0	5	9	18	−9	2	

Source: VFF

== Relegation playoff ==
Quân Khu 3	3–0	Tây Ninh

== Third place match ==
1 May 1983

Cảng Hải Phòng	2–1	Cảng Sài Gòn
Lê Quang Ninh 8', 48'		Hòa 45'

Thống Nhất Stadium, Ho Chi Minh City

== Final ==
1 May 1983

Quân Đội	2–1	Hải Quan

Hàng Đẫy Stadium, Hanoi

Vietnam National A1 League
champions

2nd title
