= 1986 V-League =

V-League
- Season: 1986
- Dates: 30 March – 8 June
- Champions: Cảng Sài Gòn (1st title)
- Matches: 129
- Goals: 309 (2.4 per match)
- Top goalscorer: Nguyễn Văn Dũng; Nguyễn Minh Huy (12 goals each)

The 1986 Vietnam National A1 League was the 6th season of the National Football Championship in Vietnam, played from 30 March until 8 June 1986.

== First phase ==
20 participants divided over 3 groups playing double round robin. The top 2 teams of each group advance to second phase. No teams would relegate this season.

Similar to some Soviet Top League seasons, a draw limit was used. In this case, from the 4th draw on points would not be counted.

=== Group A ===
Pos	Team	Pld	W	D	L	GF	GA	GD	Pts	Qualification
1	Công Nghiệp Hà Nam Ninh	12	5	4	3	21	14	+7	13	Qualify for Second stage
2	Công Nghiệp TP.HCM	12	5	5	2	13	11	+2	13	Qualify for Second stage
3	Phòng Không	12	4	6	2	15	10	+5	11	
4	Lâm Đồng	12	4	3	5	8	13	−5	11	
5	Cảng Hải Phòng	12	3	6	3	11	8	+3	9	
6	Phú Khánh	12	3	5	4	9	11	−2	9	
7	Công An Thanh Hóa	12	2	3	7	8	18	−10	7	

Source: VFF

=== Group B ===
Pos	Team	Pld	W	D	L	GF	GA	GD	Pts	Qualification
1	Hải Quan	12	7	4	1	14	4	+10	17	Qualify for Second stage
2	Quân Đội	12	7	4	1	12	6	+6	17	Qualify for Second stage
3	Than Quảng Ninh	12	5	3	4	15	13	+2	13	
4	Công Nhân Nghĩa Bình	12	3	3	6	11	13	−2	9	
5	Công An Hải Phòng	12	3	3	6	5	9	−4	9	
6	Quân Khu Thủ Đô	12	2	7	3	13	15	−2	7	
7	Công Nghiệp Thực Phẩm	12	1	4	7	5	15	−10	5	

Source: VFF

=== Group C ===
Pos	Team	Pld	W	D	L	GF	GA	GD	Pts	Qualification
1	Cảng Sài Gòn	10	5	3	2	18	9	+9	13	Qualify for Second stage
2	Công An TP.HCM	10	5	4	1	18	11	+7	13	Qualify for Second stage
3	Quảng Nam-Đà Nẵng	10	4	5	1	11	5	+6	11	
4	Công An Hà Nội	10	3	4	3	13	16	−3	9	
5	Sông Lam Nghệ Tĩnh	10	2	3	5	9	17	−8	7	
6	Quân Khu 3	10	0	3	7	11	22	−11	3	

Source: VFF

== Second phase ==
In the second phase, the six qualified teams would play a one-leg round-robin. Matches that ended with a draw after 90 minutes would decide the winner team in the penalty-shootouts.

Pos	Team	Pld	W	L	GF	GA	GD	Pts	Qualification
1	Cảng Sài Gòn	5	5	0	11	3	+8	10	Champions
2	Quân Đội	5	4	1	7	4	+3	9	
3	Hải Quan	5	3	2	13	10	+3	8	
4	Công Nghiệp TP.HCM	5	1	4	8	12	−4	6	
5	Công Nghiệp Hà Nam Ninh	5	1	4	8	13	−5	6	
6	Công An TP.HCM	5	1	4	6	11	−5	6	

Source: VFF

Vietnam National A1 League
champions

1st title
