= 1984 V-League =

Vietnam National A1 League
- Season: 1984
- Dates: 19 February – 1 May
- Champions: Công An Hà Nội (1st title)
- Relegated: An Giang; Dệt Nam Định
- Matches: 127
- Goals: 341 (2.69 per match)
- Top goalscorer: Nguyễn Văn Dũng (15 goals)

The 1984 Vietnam National A1 League was the 4th season of the National Football Championship in Vietnam, played from February 1984 until May 1984.

18 teams took part in the competition that was played in four stages; a First Stage featuring 3 groups of 6 teams of which the top four entered the second stage and the bottom clubs entered a relegation stage.

From stage two, the top two teams from two groups of 6 would enter the semi-final stage with the respective winners entering the final to determine the champions.

== First stage ==
- Top four advance to the second stage.
- Bottom placed teams in each group go into relegation playoff.

=== Group A ===
Pos	Team	Pld	W	D	L	GF	GA	GD	Pts	Qualification
1	Quân Khu 3	10	5	4	1	10	5	+5	14	Qualify for 2nd stage
2	Công An Hà Nội	10	3	5	2	12	11	+1	11	Qualify for 2nd stage
3	Cảng Hải Phòng	10	4	3	3	10	9	+1	11	Qualify for 2nd stage
4	Cảng Sài Gòn	10	4	2	4	19	16	+3	10	Qualify for 2nd stage
5	Quảng Nam-Đà Nẵng	10	2	6	2	6	7	−1	10	
6	Dệt Nam Định	10	1	2	7	6	15	−9	4	Relegation Playoff

Source: VFF

=== Group B ===
Pos	Team	Pld	W	D	L	GF	GA	GD	Pts	Qualification
1	Quân Đội	10	3	5	2	16	11	+5	11	Qualify for 2nd stage
2	Công Nghiệp Xây Dựng	10	2	7	1	14	13	+1	11	Qualify for 2nd stage
3	Sở Công Nghiệp TP.HCM	10	3	5	2	12	11	+1	11	Qualify for 2nd stage
4	Công Nhân Nghĩa Bình	10	3	4	3	11	13	−2	10	Qualify for 2nd stage
5	Than Quảng Ninh	10	2	5	3	11	11	0	9	
6	An Giang	10	3	2	5	12	17	−5	8	Relegation Playoff

Source: VFF

=== Group C ===
Pos	Team	Pld	W	D	L	GF	GA	GD	Pts	Qualification
1	Hải Quan	10	6	2	2	20	10	+10	14	Qualify for 2nd stage
2	Công Nghiệp Hà Nam Ninh	10	4	3	3	15	15	0	11	Qualify for 2nd stage
3	Tổng Cục Đường Sắt	10	3	4	3	18	15	+3	10	Qualify for 2nd stage
4	Phòng Không	10	3	4	3	13	15	−2	10	Qualify for 2nd stage
5	Quân Khu Thủ Đô	10	3	2	5	11	15	−4	8	
6	Phú Khánh	10	2	3	5	10	17	−7	7	Relegation Playoff

Source: VFF

== Second stage ==
- Top two advance to the semi-finals.

=== Group A ===
Pos	Team	Pld	W	D	L	GF	GA	GD	Pts	Qualification
1	Tổng Cục Đường Sắt	5	4	0	1	10	6	+4	8	Qualify for semi-finals
2	Sở Công Nghiệp TP.HCM	5	4	0	1	9	5	+4	8	Qualify for semi-finals
3	Công Nghiệp Hà Nam Ninh	5	4	0	1	12	11	+1	8	
4	Công Nghiệp Xây Dựng	5	2	0	3	6	8	−2	4	
5	Cảng Sài Gòn	5	1	0	4	10	9	+1	2	
6	Quân Khu 3	5	0	0	5	3	11	−8	0	

Source: VFF

=== Group B ===
Pos	Team	Pld	W	D	L	GF	GA	GD	Pts	Qualification
1	Quân Đội	5	4	0	1	13	5	+8	8	Qualify for semi-finals
2	Công An Hà Nội	5	4	0	1	9	4	+5	8	Qualify for semi-finals
3	Phòng Không	5	3	0	2	5	8	−3	6	
4	Cảng Hải Phong	5	2	0	3	4	5	−1	4	
5	Hải Quan	5	1	0	4	6	6	0	2	
6	Công Nhân Nghĩa Bình	5	1	0	4	5	14	−9	2	

Source: VFF

== Semi-finals ==
Công An Hà Nội	1–0	Tổng Cục Đường Sắt

Quân Đội	3–2	Sở Công Nghiệp TP.HCM

== Third place match ==
30 April 1984

Sở Công Nghiệp TP.HCM	4–1	Tổng Cục Đường Sắt
Phan Trung Việt 4'; Nguyễn Trọng Giáp 76', 89'; Nguyễn Trung Hải 83'	Report	Lê Khánh Hùng 51'

Thống Nhất Stadium, Ho Chi Minh City
Attendance: 25,000
Referee: Nguyễn Văn Mùi

== Final ==
1 May 1984

Quân Đội	1–2	Công An Hà Nội
	Report	Nguyễn Văn Nhã (?)

Hàng Đẫy Stadium, Hanoi
Attendance: 25,000

== Relegation playoff ==
Pos	Team	Pld	W	D	L	GF	GA	GD	Pts	Relegation
1	Phú Khánh	2	2	0	0	2	1	+1	4	
2	An Giang	2	1	0	1	4	2	+2	2	Relegated
3	Dệt Nam Định	2	0	0	2	3	6	−3	0	Relegated

Vietnam National A1 League
champions

1st title
