= 1991 V-League =

V-League
- Season: 1991
- Dates: 7 April – 9 June
- Champions: Hải Quan (1st title)
- Relegated: Công An Thanh Hóa; Công Nhân Quảng Ninh; Thanh Niên Hà Nội
- Asian Club Championship: Hải Quan
- Asian Cup Winners' Cup: Quảng Nam-Đà Nẵng
- Matches: 116
- Goals: 240 (2.07 per match)
- Top goalscorer: Hà Vương Ngầu Nại (10 goals)

The 1991 Vietnam National Elite Football Championship was the 10th season of the National Football Championship in Vietnam, played from 7 April until 9 June 1991..

== First phase ==
19 participants divided into 3 groups playing double round robin; 8 clubs qualified for quarterfinals, while 6 clubs entered relegation playoffs, 3 clubs going down.

== Second phase ==
=== Quarter-finals ===
Tiền Giang	0–2	Quảng Nam-Đà Nẵng

Quảng Nam-Đà Nẵng	4–0	Tiền Giang

Quảng Nam-Đà Nẵng won 6–0 on aggregate.

Điện Hải Phòng	0–1	Công An Hải Phòng

Công An Hải Phòng	2–1	Điện Hải Phòng

Công An Hải Phòng won 3–1 on aggregate.

Hải Quan	1–2	An Giang

An Giang	0–2	Hải Quan

Hải Quan won 3–2 on aggregate.

Công An TP.HCM	1–3	Cảng Sài Gòn

Cảng Sài Gòn	0–0	Công An TP.HCM

Cảng Sài Gòn won 3–1 on aggregate.

=== Semi-finals ===
4 June 1991

Công An Hải Phòng	2–2	Hải Quan
Penalties
	8–9

5 June 1991

Quảng Nam-Đà Nẵng	2–1	Cảng Sài Gòn

=== Final ===
9 June 1991

Hải Quan	2–2 (a.e.t.)	Quảng Nam-Đà Nẵng
Nguyễn Trung Hải 47'; Đinh Thanh Hải 115'	Report	Phan Công Thìn 11', 102'
Penalties
Nguyễn Minh Hùng (penalty scored); Phùng Thanh Lâm (penalty scored); Trần Minh Trí (penalty missed); Trần Văn Tiến (penalty missed); Nguyễn Phi Hùng (penalty scored)	3–2	Lê Văn Sinh (penalty missed); Bùi Thông Tân (penalty scored); Phạm Phú Anh (penalty scored); Trần Minh Toàn (penalty missed); Hoàng Kim Tuấn (penalty missed)

Thống Nhất Stadium, Ho Chi Minh City
Attendance: 25,000

Vietnam National Elite Football Championship
Champions

1st title
