= Nguyễn Huy Cường =

Vietnamese footballer

Personal information
- Full name: Nguyễn Huy Cường
- Date of birth: November 8, 1986 (age 39)
- Place of birth: Móng Cái, Quảng Ninh, Vietnam
- Height: 1.80 m (5 ft 11 in)
- Position: Centre-back

Youth career
- 2005–2008: Than Quảng Ninh

Senior career*
Years	Team	Apps	(Gls)
2009–2011	Than Quảng Ninh	32	(0)
2012–2013	Thanh Hóa	28	(0)
2014–2018	Than Quảng Ninh	62	(0)

International career
2014–2016	Vietnam	5	(1)
- * Club domestic league appearances and goals as of 26 June 2018

Nguyễn Huy Cường (born 8 November 1986) is former Vietnamese footballer who previously played as a centre-back for V-League club Than Quảng Ninh and the Vietnam national football team.
