= Amaobi Uzowuru =

Nigerian footballer

Amaobi
Personal information
- Full name: Amaobi Honest Uzowuru
- Date of birth: 19 September 1981 (age 45)
- Place of birth: Warri, Delta State, Nigeria
- Position: Striker

Senior career*
Years	Team	Apps	(Gls)
-1998	River Lane		
1998-1999	Nigerdock		
1999-2000	Stationery Stores		
2000-2001	Kwara Stars		
2001-2002	NITEL		
2002	Moroka Swallows		
2002-2003	Spartak FC		
2003-2004	Sông Đà Nam Định		
2004-2005	Rio Ave		
2005	SHB Đà Nẵng		(10)
2006-2007	Becamex Bình Dương		(18)
2008	SHB Đà Nẵng		(1)
2008	Vissai Ninh Bình		
2009	Nam Định		
2010	Hùng Vương An Giang		
2011	Bình Định		
2014	Thanh Hóa	7	(2)
- * Club domestic league appearances and goals

Amaobi Honest Uzowuru (born 19 September 1981), also known as Đặng Amaobi or simply known as Amaobi, is a Nigerian former footballer.

He became a naturalized Vietnamese citizen in 2011.
