= 2003 V-League =

V-League
- Season: 2003
- Dates: 19 January – 22 June
- Champions: Hoàng Anh Gia Lai (1st title)
- Relegated: Cảng Sài Gòn; LG-ACB
- AFC Champions League: Hoàng Anh Gia Lai; Bình Định
- ASEAN Club Championship: Hoàng Anh Gia Lai
- Matches: 132
- Goals: 323 (2.45 per match)
- Top goalscorer: Emeka Achilefu (14 goals)

The 2003 V-League, referred as the 2003 PepsiCo V-League for sponsorship reasons, was the 20th season of the V-League, the highest division of Vietnamese football and the 3rd season as professional league. The season began on 19 January and concluded on 22 June 2003.

Hoàng Anh Gia Lai won their first title in this season.

== League table ==
Pos	Team	Pld	W	D	L	GF	GA	GD	Pts	Qualification or relegation
1	Hoàng Anh Gia Lai (C)	22	12	7	3	41	26	+15	43	Qualification to AFC Champions League & ASEAN Club Championship
2	Gạch Đồng Tâm Long An	22	11	7	4	34	17	+17	40	
3	Nam Định	22	10	6	6	22	19	+3	36	
4	Bình Định (Note: Bình Định qualified to 2004 AFC Champions League by winning the 2003 Vietnamese Cup.)	22	10	5	7	27	21	+6	35	Qualification to AFC Champions League
5	Sông Lam Nghệ An	22	9	5	8	25	16	+9	32	
6	Thể Công	22	9	5	8	28	27	+1	32	
7	Đồng Tháp	22	8	6	8	28	28	0	30	
8	Hàng Không Việt Nam	22	8	5	9	23	25	−2	29	
9	Đông Á Bank	22	7	7	8	22	24	−2	28	
10	Đà Nẵng	22	8	3	11	24	29	−5	27	
11	Cảng Sài Gòn (R)	22	4	7	11	26	41	−15	19	Relegation to First Division
12	LG-ACB (R)	22	2	5	15	22	49	−27	11	Relegation to First Division

Rules for classification: 1) Points; 2) Head-to-head points; 3) Head-to-head goal difference; 4) Head-to-head goals scored; 5) Goal difference; 6) Goals scored; 7) Disciplinary points (1 point for each yellow card, 3 points for each red card)
(C) Champions; (R) Relegated
