= Lê Văn Đặng =

Vietnamese footballer

Lê Văn Đặng (1947 – 16 January 2022) was a Vietnamese former footballer.

== Early life ==
He started playing football at the age of ten.

== Career ==
He was the top scorer of the 1980 V-League with ten goals.

== Style of play ==
He is right-footed.

== Personal life ==
He has been nicknamed "Đặng cóc".
