= 1998 V-League =

Vietnamese National First Division'
- Season: 1998
- Dates: 1 March – 14 June
- Champions: Quân Đội (5th title)
- Relegated: Bình Định; Bình Dương; Hải Quan
- Asian Club Championship: Quân Đội
- Asian Cup Winners' Cup: Công An TP.HCM
- Matches: 180
- Goals: 458 (2.54 per match)
- Top goalscorer: Nguyễn Văn Dũng (17 goals)

The 1998 Vietnamese National First Division was the 16th season of the National Football Championship in Vietnam, played from 1 March until 14 June 1998.

== Standings ==
Pos	Team	Pld	W	D	L	GF	GA	GD	Pts	Qualification or relegation
1	Quân Đội (C)	26	13	8	5	40	20	+20	47	Qualification to Asian Club Championship & Dunhill Cup
2	Sông Lam Nghệ An	26	13	5	8	46	34	+12	44 (Note: Head-to-head points: Sông Lam Nghệ An: 4, Công An TP.HCM: 1.)	Qualification to Dunhill Cup
3	Công An TP.HCM	26	12	8	6	41	30	+11	44	Qualification to Asian Cup Winners' Cup & Dunhill Cup
4	Công an Hà Nội (Note: Công An Hà Nội's result against Công An Hải Phòng in Matchday 15 (0–1 loss) was cancelled and the team was deducted 3 points.)	25	13	6	6	34	24	+10	42	Qualification to Dunhill Cup
5	Cảng Sài Gòn	26	10	8	8	45	34	+11	38 (Note: Head-to-head points: Cảng Sài Gòn 4, Lâm Đồng: 1.)	Qualification to Dunhill Cup
6	Lâm Đồng	26	11	5	10	35	40	−5	38	Qualification to Dunhill Cup
7	Đồng Tháp	26	8	12	6	35	36	−1	36	Qualification to Dunhill Cup
8	Nam Định (Note: Nam Định's result against Bình Dương in Matchday 13 (0–0 draw) was cancelled.)	25	10	4	11	33	30	+3	34	Qualification to Dunhill Cup
9	Khánh Hòa (Note: Khánh Hòa's result against Bình Dương in Matchday 17 (4–4 draw) was cancelled.)	25	8	8	9	27	30	−3	32	
10	Công An Hải Phòng (Note: Công An Hải Phòng's result against Công An Hà Nội in Matchday 15 (1–0 win) was cancelled.)	25	7	9	9	30	30	0	30	
11	Hải Quan (R)	26	6	12	8	21	26	−5	30	Qualification to relegation play offs.
12	Long An (O)	26	5	12	9	20	29	−9	27	Qualification to relegation play offs.
13	Bình Dương (Note: Bình Dương's results against Nam Định in Matchday 13 (0–0 draw) and against Khánh Hòa in Matchday 17 (4–4 draw) were cancelled, and the team was deducted 2 points.) (R)	24	6	8	10	23	36	−13	24	Relegation to Second Division
14	Bình Định (R)	26	3	3	20	19	50	−31	12	Relegation to Second Division

Source: VFF
Rules for classification: 1) Points; 2) Head-to-head points; 3) Goal difference; 4) Number of goals scored; 5) Number of away goals scored; 6) Draw of lots.
(C) Champions; (O) Play-off winners; (R) Relegated

== Relegation play-offs ==
6 December 1998

Hải Quan	2–2	Thừa Thiên Huế
Anh Trung	Report	o.g.' Trần Quang Phú

Thống Nhất Stadium, Ho Chi Minh City
13 December 1998
15:00

Thừa Thiên Huế	0–0	Hải Quan
	Report

Tự Do Stadium, Thừa Thiên Huế

2–2 on aggregate; Thừa Thiên Huế won on away goals and promote to the National First Division.

6 December 1998

Kiên Giang	0–2	Long An

Rạch Giá Stadium, Kiên Giang
13 December 1998

Long An	3–0	Kiên Giang

Long An Stadium, Long An

Long won 5–0 on aggregate and remain in the National First Division.
