= 1992 V-League =

Vietnamese football league season

V-League
- Season: 1992
- Dates: 29 March – 14 May
- Champions: Quảng Nam-Đà Nẵng (1st title)
- Relegated: Công An Hà Nội; Dệt Nam Định; Khánh Hòa; Quân Khu 5
- Asian Club Championship: Quảng Nam-Đà Nẵng
- Asian Cup Winners' Cup: Cảng Sài Gòn
- Top goalscorer: Trần Minh Toàn (6 goals)

The 1992 Vietnam National Elite Football Championship was the 11th season of the National Football Championship in Vietnam, played from 29 March until 14 May 1992.

== First phase ==
18 participants divided into 2 groups playing single round robin; top-4 of both passed onto the second stage.

== Second phase ==
8 participants playing double round robin; top-4 moved onto the semifinals.

=== Semi-finals ===
Công An Hải Phòng	2–1	Quân Đội

Quảng Nam-Đà Nẵng	2–1	Sông Lam Nghệ Tĩnh

=== Final ===
14 May 1992

Công An Hải Phòng	0–2	Quảng Nam-Đà Nẵng
	Report	Nguyễn Hữu Cầu 43'; Bùi Nam 72'

Chi Lăng Stadium, Quảng Nam-Đà Nẵng

Vietnam National Elite Football Championship
Champions

1st title
