= 1990 V-League =

V-League
- Season: 1990
- Dates: 1 March – 20 May
- Champions: Quân Đội (4th title)
- Matches: 93
- Goals: 165 (1.77 per match)
- Top goalscorer: Nguyễn Hồng Sơn (10 goals)

The 1990 Vietnam National Elite Football Championship was the 9th season of the National Football Championship in Vietnam, played from 1 March until 20 May 1990.

This was the first season of the league under the name National Elite Football Championship, after the "split division" year in the previous season to reduce the number of participating teams to improve the league's quality. 18 teams qualified for the league through the results from the previous season.

== First phase ==
- Saigon Port
- Hanoi Police
- Nam Dinh Textile
- Angiang
- Tiengiang
- Haiphong Police
- Dongthap
- Longan
- Thanhhoa Police
- HCM City Customs
- Vietnamese Railway
- Constructional Workers
- Army Club (The Cong)
- Haiphong Electricity
- Nghiabinh Workers
- Lamdong
- Quangnam-Danang
- Lam River-Nghetinh

Teams were divided into 3 groups playing double round robin; no points for more than 3 draws; bottom clubs of each group relegated: top-2 of each and two best 3rd placed clubs to second phase.

== Second phase ==
Played in 2 groups of 4, single round robin; top-2 of each to semifinals.

== Final round ==
=== Semi-finals ===
5 May 1990

Quân Đội	4–0	An Giang
Penalties
	4–3

Cột Cờ Stadium, Hanoi

6 May 1990

Hải Quan	Cancelled	Quảng Nam-Đà Nẵng

Chi Lăng Stadium, Đà Nẵng

The match was initially reported due to an issue during the game. A replay was proposed by the league's organisers but was refused by Hải Quan. As the result, Quảng Nam-Đà Nẵng advanced to the final.

=== Third place match ===
Following Hải Quan's withdrawal in the semi-finals, An Giang was automatically awarded the third place.

=== Final ===
20 May 1990

Quân Đội	4–0	Quảng Nam-Đà Nẵng

Vinh Stadium, Nghệ Tĩnh
Referee: Đỗ Đình Hùng

Vietnam National Elite Football Championship
champions

4th title
