= Nguyễn Thế Anh (footballer, born 1949) =

Vietnamese footballer

Personal information
- Full name: Nguyễn Thế Anh
- Date of birth: 22 July 1949 (age 77)
- Place of birth: Hanoi, French Indochina
- Height: 1.65 m (5 ft 5 in)
- Position: Forward

Youth career
- 1964–1965: Thanh Niên Hà Nội

Senior career*
Years	Team	Apps	(Gls)
1965–1984	Thể Công	412	(68)
Total		412	(69)

International career
1970	North Vietnam	1	(1)
- * Club domestic league appearances and goals

Nguyễn Thế Anh (born 22 July 1949, in Hanoi, French Indochina), also referred to as Ba Đẻn is a retired Vietnamese footballer. He was a part of Thể Công and North Vietnam national football team as an attacker. Đẻn is considered as one of the best football player in Vietnam football’s history and famous with the number 11 on his shirt, and had 1 international match with Cuba.

== Personal life ==
Nguyen The Anh is the third child of the former famous football player in northern Vietnam, Nguyen Van Thin (nicknamed Thin A, once a player of the Noi Chau team, recruited Tonkin and Hanoi Police and Vietnam Democratic Republic recruiting, he has three brothers (Nguyễn Cao Cường, Cao Vinh and Cao Hien) are famous players in Vietnam, in which Nguyễn Cao Cường is one of the greatest Vietnamese football players in history.

== Career ==
Initially he practiced and competed for Hanoi Youth Team in the years 1964–1965. When participating in the selection of The Public Football team, although impressed by his soccer skills, he was eliminated because he was small and had a bow, and he joined The Body only after being ex-player Ngo. Xuan Quynh (Political politician) guarantees.

From November 1967 to 1968, he and 25 other young players of The Public (including Nguyen Trong Giap, Phan Van My, Vu Manh Hai, Nguyen Duy Phu, Nguyen Van Nhat, Vuong Tien Dung, Hoang Gia, Vu Dinh Boi, Bui Xuan Theu, Nguyen Viet Cau, Bui Ngoc Chi, Tran Quoc Nghi, Le Quang Minh, Tran Ngoc Hung, Nguyen Duc Minh ...) went to the People's Democratic Republic of Korea to practice.

In 1970, he played his first official match for The Cong when playing friendly against the Cuba national team. After that, he took on the national team playing against Cuba. However, this is also the only time he has won the national team shirt throughout his career because after the match against Cuba, the Vietnamese national team was no longer concentrated until he hung his shoes.

He retired from the field in 1984. He then became a football coach of the Military Sports Center. In 1998, he worked as an assistant to Mr. Vuong Tien Dung and won the Vietnamese championship and Vietnam Super Cup. In 2005, he was the coach of the Head of the U-18 Team to attend the U.18 national football tournament.
