= 1981–82 V-League =

Vietnam National A1 League
- Season: 1981–1982
- Dates: 8 March 1981 – 4 April 1982
- Champions: Quân Đội (1st title)
- Relegated: Lương Thực-Thực Phâm; CNXD Hải Phòng
- Matches: 143
- Goals: 338 (2.36 per match)
- Top goalscorer: Võ Thành Sơn (15 goals)

The 1981–82 Vietnam National A1 League was the 2nd season of the National Football Championship in Vietnam, played from March 1981 until April 1982.

17 clubs participated in this edition, including top 14 teams of the previous season, 2 newly-promoted teams and Quân Đội returned after the absence in 1980 due to internal reasons.

17 teams took part in the competition that was played in two stages; a Group Stage featuring 2 groups of 9 and 8 teams and a Championship stage featuring the top three from each group. Two teams would be relegated, one from each group.

== Group stage ==
- Top three advanced to the Championship stage.
- Bottom placed teams in each group automatically relegated

=== Group A ===
Pos	Team	Pld	W	D	L	GF	GA	GD	Pts	Qualification or relegation
1	Than Quảng Ninh	16	6	9	1	32	19	+13	21	Qualify for Championship stage
2	Công An Hà Nội	16	5	9	2	18	15	+3	19	Qualify for Championship stage
3	Quân Khu Thủ Đô	16	5	8	3	19	15	+4	18	Qualify for Championship stage
4	Phòng Không	16	6	4	6	19	20	−1	16	
5	Hải Quan	16	4	7	5	15	15	0	15	
6	Tây Ninh	16	4	7	5	20	21	−1	15	
7	Cảng Hải Phòng	16	2	10	4	18	20	−2	14	
8	Phú Khánh	16	5	4	7	14	25	−11	14	
9	Lương Thực-Thực Phẩm	16	3	6	7	16	21	−5	12	Relegated

Source: VFF

=== Group B ===
Pos	Team	Pld	W	D	L	GF	GA	GD	Pts	Qualification or relegation
1	Quân Đội	14	10	2	2	25	11	+14	22	Qualify for Championship stage
2	Sở Công Nghiệp TP.HCM	14	6	4	4	23	18	+5	16	Qualify for Championship stage
3	Quân Khu 3	14	6	4	4	17	13	+4	16	Qualify for Championship stage
4	Tổng Cục Đường Sắt	14	4	6	4	18	16	+2	14	
5	Cảng Sài Gòn	14	4	5	5	12	14	−2	13	
6	Công Nhân Nghĩa Bình	14	3	5	6	17	24	−7	11	
7	CNXD Hà Nội	14	2	6	6	11	18	−7	10	
8	CNXD Hải Phòng	14	3	4	7	8	17	−9	10	Relegated

Source: VFF

== Championship stage ==
Pos	Team	Pld	W	D	L	GF	GA	GD	Pts	Qualification
1	Quân Đội	5	4	0	1	8	4	+4	8	Champions
2	Quân Khu Thủ Đô	5	3	1	1	7	5	+2	7	
3	Công An Hà Nội	5	2	2	1	5	4	+1	6	
4	Sở Công Nghiệp TP.HCM	5	2	1	2	8	8	0	5	
5	Than Quảng Ninh	5	1	0	4	4	6	−2	2	
6	Quân Khu 3	5	0	2	3	5	10	−5	2	

Source: VFF

Vietnam National A1 League
champions

1st title
