= Nguyễn Cao Cường =

Vietnamese footballer

Personal information
- Full name: Nguyễn Cao Cường
- Date of birth: 27 October 1954 (age 72)
- Place of birth: Hanoi, North Vietnam
- Height: 1.72 m (5 ft 8 in)
- Position: Second striker

Youth career
- 1970–1973: Thể Công

Senior career*
| Years | Team | Apps | (Gls) |
| 1973–1990 | Thể Công | 332 | (127) |
| Total | | 332 | (127) |

International career
| 1982–1985 | Vietnam | 5 | (8) |
- * Club domestic league appearances and goals

Nguyễn Cao Cường (born 1954) is the retired Vietnamese footballer who played from 1970 to 1990 as a second striker for Thể Công and Vietnam. He is widely acknowledged to have been one of the Vietnamese greatest-ever footballer in all-times. He once won the Vietnam Football Championship four times, once won the title of Top-scores breaking the 1982-1983 season with 22 goals and twice was voted the typical Vietnamese athlete in 1981 and 1983.

== Career ==
In 1970, he joined the Fitness Football team when he was 16 years old, playing in the youth team. Three years later, due to his outstanding performance in the youth team, he was specially added to the 1st Public Team, selected to compete for the Public Sports team in China, the German Democratic Republic, Hungary. In 1982, he was selected for the Vietnam Youth team to play in the Soviet Union and Hungary.

From 1986 to 1989, he had just participated in a competition and attended a university in the field of coaching football coach, and was awarded the title of sports grandmaster. In 1990, he officially became the Coach of the Young Football Teams of the Military Sports Center.

In 1994, Labor Newspaper awarded him the title of Vietnam's Best Player of the Period 1975-1995.

In 2002, he was a coach of the U15 Football team and won a silver medal in Vietnam U15 football championship. In 2004 he was appointed Deputy Director of the Physical Fitness Football Club with the rank of Colonel.

In 2006, he replaced his former teammate, Nguyen Manh Cuong, to become the head coach of Can Cong, leading the team to participate in the First Division.

In 2009, he retired after the Public Sports team was dissolved and the players were transferred to Thanh Hoa. He later became director of sports strategy development of Hanoi F.C.

== Personal life ==
He was born on October 27, 1954, in Hanoi. His father was Mr. Nguyen Van Thin, nicknamed Thin A, a famous former player in North Vietnam, used to be a player of the Noi Chau team, recruited Bac Ky and CAHN and recruited the Democratic Republic of Vietnam. . His brother is Nguyen The Anh (Ba Đẻn), Thể Công teammate and his children are Cao Vinh and Cao Hien (recruiting VNS captain is also famous players in Vietnam.

== Honours ==
- Sports Grandmaster
- Vietnamese Champions (3): 1974, 1975, 1976.
- V.League 1 in 1982, 1983, 1987.
- 3 times the top of 10 typical Vietnamese athletes (organized by Vietnam Sports Newspaper in 1981, 1982, 1984).
- The best Vietnamese footballer in 20 years of reunification (1975-1995) by Labor newspaper.
