= Emeka Achilefu =

Nigerian footballer

Personal information
- Full name: Chukwuemeka Achilefu
- Date of birth: 1974 (age 51–52)
- Place of birth: Nigeria
- Height: 1.81 m (5 ft 11 in)
- Position: Striker

Senior career*
Years	Team	Apps	(Gls)
2002–2003	Nam Định		(22)
2004	Hà Nội ACB		(11)
2005	Đà Nẵng		(7)
- * Club domestic league appearances and goals

Chukwuemeka Achilefu (born c. 1974) is a Nigerian former footballer who is last known to have played as a striker for SHB Đà Nẵng.

== Career ==
Before playing in Vietnam, Achilefu played in several South Asian countries. After that, he played in Vietnam, where he became regarded as a famous foreign player during his five seasons in the country.
