= Than Quang Ninh FC =

Vietnamese football club

- Full name: Than Quang Ninh Football Club
- Nickname: Đội bóng Đất Mỏ (The team of Miner's Land)
- Short name: TQN, Than QN, QN
- Founded: 24 April 1956; 70 years ago
- Dissolved: 25 August 2021; 5 years ago
- Ground: Cẩm Phả Stadium
- Capacity: 20,000

Than Quang Ninh Football Club (Vietnamese: Câu lạc bộ Bóng đá Than Quảng Ninh), simply known as Quang Ninh or TQN, was a professional football club, based in Cẩm Phả, Quảng Ninh Province, Vietnam.

They last played in the V.League 1 in 2021 and were sponsored by Vinacomin. They were omitted from V-League competitions for 2022, after loss of their main sponsor and other financial difficulties.

== History ==
On 24 April 1956, the Party Committee of Hồng Quảng gathered a number of young men who knew how to play football to form the Công Nhân Hồng Quảng football team. The team won the 1962 North Vietnam Class A League.

In 1964, after Hồng Quảng and Hải Ninh merged into Quảng Ninh, the team was then renamed to Than Quảng Ninh. The team finish runners-up in the 1970 North Vietnam Class A League, and after the countries reunification the team finish fourth in the 1984 National Championship.

In 1990, the team was renamed to Công Nhân Quảng Ninh, having promoted with national strong teams. After the end of the second national football tournament of strong teams in 1991, Công Nhân Quảng Ninh and Hanoi Youth teams and Công An Thanh Hóa were relegated. As the result, Công Nhân Quâng Ninh's football team was dissolved. In 1994, the team was re-established with the new name Công Nhân Hạ Long.

In 1996, Vietnamese football organized a classification tournament, the team with the new name "Quang Ninh Workers' Club" won the right to compete in the 1997 National Second Division (equivalent to the first division in the period from 2000–01 season onwards).

From the 1997 to 1999 season, the team competed in the National Second Division, after the 1999-2000 new classification season of Vietnamese football, the team won the right to play in the First Division. At the end of the 2000–01 National First Division, the team ranked last and was relegated to the Second Division. After the 2001–02 Second Division, Quảng Ninh continued to be relegated to the Third Division.

In the two seasons of 2003 and 2004, Than Quang Ninh played in the National Third Division and was only promoted to the National Second Division in 2005. In the following season, the team finished runners-up and promoted to the First Division in 2007. From then until the end of the 2013 football season, Than Quang Ninh played in the First Division (renamed to V.League 2 in 2013).

The team started competing in the V.League 1 from the 2014 season after finishing runners-up in the 2013 V.League 2. In 2016, the team won the 2016 Vietnamese Cup after defeating Hà Nội T&T in the final. In the same year, the team went on to win their first Vietnamese Super Cup, after winning again against Hà Nội (former name Hà Nội T&T) in the penalty-shootouts.

In 2017, Than Quảng Ninh competed in their first continental competition, the 2017 AFC Cup, but was eliminated from the group stage. In the 2019 season, Than Quảng Ninh finish third place in the V.League 1, gaining their second continental qualification to the 2020 AFC Cup. They played three matches in the competition's group stage before it was cancelled due to Covid-19.

On 25 August 2021, due to financial difficulties, Than Quảng Ninh officially ceased operations and terminated the contract of all players and staffs. The club's president Phạm Thanh Hùng admitted that the club owed the players more than 70 billion VND but was unable to pay. The team's officials then wrote a request for help to the authorities of Quảng Ninh province but received no response.

In 2022, the club was officially banned by FIFA, the AFC and VFF from participating in any professional football leagues.

== Final squad ==
As of November 2021

Note: Flags indicate national team as defined under FIFA eligibility rules; some limited exceptions apply. Players may hold more than one non-FIFA nationality.

No.	Pos.	Nation	Player

== Kit suppliers and shirt sponsors ==
Period	Kit manufacturer	Shirt sponsor
2016-2021	Joma	Asanzo Vinacomin

== Honours ==
=== National competitions ===
League

- V.League 2:

(silver) Runners-up : 2010, 2013

- Second Division:

(silver) Runners-up : 2006

- North Vietnam Football Championship:

(gold) Winners : 1962
(silver) Runners-up : 1970
Cup

- Vietnamese Cup:

(gold) Winners : 2016

- Vietnamese Super Cup:

(gold) Winners : 2016

== Continental record ==
Season	Competition	Round	Club	Home	Away	Aggregate
2017	AFC Cup	Group H	(Singapore) Home United	4–5	2–3	2nd
2017	AFC Cup	Group H	(Myanmar) Yadanarbon	1–1	3–0	2nd
2020	AFC Cup	Group G	(Indonesia) Bali United	Cancelled	1–4	2nd
2020	AFC Cup	Group G	(Philippines) Ceres–Negros	Cancelled	2–2	2nd
2020	AFC Cup	Group G	(Cambodia) Svay Rieng	Cancelled	4–1	2nd

== Season-by-season record ==
Season	Pld	Won	Draw	Lost	GF	GA	GD	PTS	Final position	Notes
1981–82 V-League	21	7	9	5	36	25	+11	23	5th	
1982–83 V-League	16	4	5	7	13	16	−3	13		
1984 V-League	10	2	5	3	11	11	+0	9		
1985 V-League	10	2	3	5	9	13	−4	7		
1986 V-League	12	5	3	4	15	13	+2	13		
1987–88 V-League	16	4	8	4	10	10	+0	12		
1991 V-League	10	2	5	3	8	10	−2	7		
2001 V. League 2	22	2	8	12	11	45	−34	14	12th	Relegation to 2002 V. League 3
2002 V. League 3	14	3	4	7	16	27	−11	13	8th	Relegation
2006 V. League 3								16	2nd	Promoted to 2007 V. League 2
2007 V. League 2	8	10	8	26	28	−2	34	9th		
2008 V. League 2	26	10	6	10	34	32	+2	36	7th	
2009 V. League 2	24	7	9	8	33	30	+3	30	7th	
2010 V. League 2	24	12	7	5	38	27	+11	43	2nd	Relegation play-off
2011 V. League 2	26	11	9	6	45	37	+8	42	4th	
2012 V.League 2	26	10	9	7	37	28	+9	39	4th	
2013 V.League 2	14	7	4	3	21	17	+4	25	2nd	Promoted to 2014 V.League 1
2014 V.League 1	22	9	2	11	43	44	−1	29	6th	
2015 V.League 1	26	13	3	10	39	31	+8	42	4th	
2016 V.League 1	26	13	5	8	39	31	+8	44	4th	Qualified for 2017 AFC Cup Group stage
2017 V.League 1	26	12	7	7	42	34	+8	43	4th	
2018 V.League 1	26	9	8	9	40	39	+1	35	5th	
2019 V.League 1	26	10	9	7	41	33	+8	39	3rd	Qualified for 2020 AFC Cup Group stage
