= Lê Huỳnh Đức =

Vietnamese footballer and manager

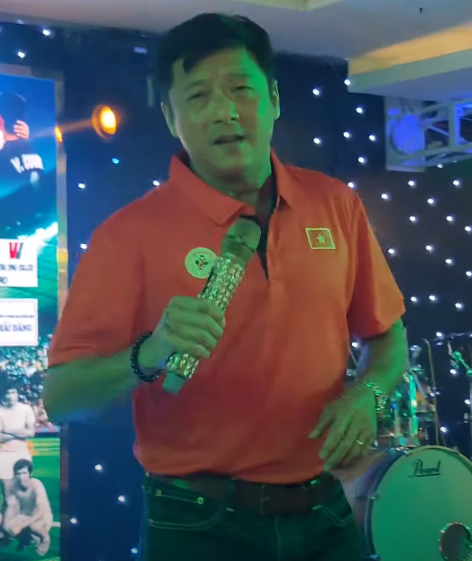
- Lê Huỳnh Đức in 2019

Personal information
- Date of birth: 20 April 1972 (age 54)
- Place of birth: Saigon, South Vietnam
- Height: 1.78 m (5 ft 10 in)
- Position: Striker

Team information
- Current team: Công An Hồ Chí Minh City (manager)

Senior career*
Years	Team	Apps	(Gls)
1995–2000	Công An Hồ Chí Minh City	86	(60)
2001	Chongqing Lifan	4	(1)
2002–2003	Đông Á Bank	10	(4)
2004–2007	SHB Đà Nẵng	26	(15)
Total		126	(79)

International career
1993–2004	Vietnam	67	(27)

Managerial career
- 2008–2017: SHB Đà Nẵng
- 2019–2021: SHB Đà Nẵng
- 2023–2024: Becamex Bình Dương
- 2025–2026: Công An Hồ Chí Minh City
- * Club domestic league appearances and goals

Lê Huỳnh Đức (born 20 April 1972) is a Vietnamese football manager and former player who is currently the head coach of V.League 1 club Công An Hồ Chí Minh City. Huỳnh Đức is a former member of the Vietnam national football team, with whom he earned 60 caps (a national record), as well as being its top scorer. He became the first Vietnamese footballer to be signed to a club outside of Vietnam when he signed on for a year's stint with Chongqing Lifan. In 2009, he became both the youngest coach to win the V-League's "Best Coach of the Month" award, and the first coach to win the award in three consecutive months. His coaching style is best known for its toughness and discipline, which is credited with helping SHB Đà Nẵng emerge as champions in the 2009 V-League season.

== Career ==
=== Player ===
Lê Huỳnh Đức began his career as a professional football player in 1991, playing with the 7th Military Region's football club in Ho Chi Minh City. The following year he moved to the Ho Chi Minh City Police, where he had his most productive stint, staying with the club until 2000. He also began playing with Vietnam's national football team during this time, joining in 1995 and playing through until 2000, returning in 2002 and 2004. He earned a record 60 caps with the national team, as well as being its top scorer. In 2001, he made Vietnamese football history by becoming the first Vietnamese footballer signed to play abroad when he joined Chongqing Lifan, a Chinese Super League club. He returned to Vietnam the following year, signing on with Ngan Hang Dong A for a two-year stay. In 2004, he made his final move to SHB Da Nang, where he stayed until his promotion to manager in 2008.

=== Coach/Manager ===
Lê Huỳnh Đức began coaching during his time with East Asian Bank football club, where he also worked as assistant manager. He continued in this role with SHB Da Nang until his promotion to Manager in 2008. The next year, he was nominated as assistant manager of Vietnam's national football team by Manager Calisto. Huỳnh Đức once again made history when he was named the V-League's Best Coach of the Month in March 2009, becoming the youngest coach to win the award. He received the same award in April and May of the same year, becoming the first coach ever to win the award for three consecutive months. His coaching is credited with helping SHB Da Nang emerge as champions in the 2009 V-League and at the Vietnamese Cup in the same year.

== International goals ==
=== Vietnam ===
No	Date	Venue	Opponent	Score	Result	Competition
1.	4 January 1995	Ho Chi Minh City, Vietnam	Estonia	1–0	1–0	1995 Independence Cup
2.	14 December 1995	Chiang Mai, Thailand	Myanmar	1–0	2–1	1995 Southeast Asian Games
3.	4 August 1996	Ho Chi Minh City, Vietnam	Chinese Taipei	1–0	4–1	1996 AFC Asian Cup qualification
4.	4 August 1996	Ho Chi Minh City, Vietnam	Chinese Taipei	2–1	4–1	1996 AFC Asian Cup qualification
5.	4 August 1996	Ho Chi Minh City, Vietnam	Chinese Taipei	3–1	4–1	1996 AFC Asian Cup qualification
6.	5 August 1996	Ho Chi Minh City, Vietnam	Guam	8–0	9–0	1996 AFC Asian Cup qualification
7.	2 September 1996	Jurong Stadium, Jurong, Singapore	Cambodia	2–0	3–1	1996 AFF Championship
8.	5 September 1996	Jurong Stadium, Jurong, Singapore	Laos	1–1	1–1	1996 AFF Championship
9.	7 September 1996	Jurong Stadium, Jurong, Singapore	Myanmar	2–0	4–1	1996 AFF Championship
10.	25 May 1997	Thong Nhat Stadium, Ho Chi Minh City, Vietnam	China	1–2	1–3	1998 FIFA World Cup qualification
11.	14 October 1997	Jakarta, Indonesia	Philippines	2–0	3–0	1997 Southeast Asian Games
12.	26 August 1998	Hanoi, Vietnam	Laos	3–1	4–1	1998 AFF Championship
13.	26 August 1998	Hanoi, Vietnam	Laos	4–1	4–1	1998 AFF Championship
14.	30 July 1999	Berakas Sports Complex, Bandar Seri Begawan, Brunei	Laos	1–0	9–0	1999 Southeast Asian Games
15.	30 July 1999	Berakas Sports Complex, Bandar Seri Begawan, Brunei	Laos	2–0	9–0	1999 Southeast Asian Games
16.	30 July 1999	Berakas Sports Complex, Bandar Seri Begawan, Brunei	Laos	3–0	9–0	1999 Southeast Asian Games
17.	30 July 1999	Berakas Sports Complex, Bandar Seri Begawan, Brunei	Laos	4–0	9–0	1999 Southeast Asian Games
18.	7 November 2000	Tinsulanon Stadium, Songkhla, Thailand	Cambodia	1–0	6–0	2000 AFF Championship
19.	7 November 2000	Tinsulanon Stadium, Songkhla, Thailand	Cambodia	5–0	6–0	2000 AFF Championship
20.	11 November 2000	Tinsulanon Stadium, Songkhla, Thailand	Singapore	1–0	1–0	2000 AFF Championship
21.	1December 2002	Colombo, Sri Lanka	Sri Lanka	1–2	2–2	Friendly
22.	15 December 2002	Gelora Bung Karno Stadium, Jakarta, Indonesia	Cambodia	5–2	9–2	2002 AFF Championship
23.	15 December 2002	Gelora Bung Karno Stadium, Jakarta, Indonesia	Cambodia	7–2	9–2	2002 AFF Championship
24.	19 December 2002	Gelora Bung Karno Stadium, Jakarta, Indonesia	Philippines	2–0	4–1	2002 AFF Championship
25.	19 December 2002	Gelora Bung Karno Stadium, Jakarta, Indonesia	Philippines	4–1	4–1	2002 AFF Championship
26.	21 December 2002	Gelora Bung Karno Stadium, Jakarta, Indonesia	Indonesia	2–1	2–2	2002 AFF Championship
27.	23 December 2002	Lebak Bulus Stadium, Jakarta, Indonesia	Myanmar	4–1	4–2	2002 AFF Championship

== Honours ==
=== Player ===
==== Ho Chi Minh City Police ====
- V.League 1

(gold) Winners : 1995

- Vietnamese National Football Cup

(gold) Winners : 1998

=== Manager ===
==== SHB Da Nang ====
- V.League 1

(gold) Winners : 2009, 2012

- Vietnamese Super Cup

(gold) Winners : 2009, 2012

- Vietnamese National Cup

(gold) Winners : 2009

- BTV Cup

(gold) Winners : 2008

=== Personal honours ===
- Top goalscorer V.League 1: 1996, 1998
- The only player to participate in 3 SEA Games football competition in a row (1995, 1997, 1999).
- The only player to participate in 5 Tiger Cups (1996, 1998, 2000, 2002, 2004).
- Vietnamese Golden Ball : 1995, 1997, 2002
- Vietnamese Silver Ball : 1998, 1999, 2000
- Tiger Cup all-time topscorer with 14 goals
- Asean Football Championship 3rd place overall top goalscorer
- Manager of month in V-League 2009
- Manager of Month in January and February in V-League 2010
