= Võ Thành Sơn =

Vietnamese footballer

Võ Thành Sơn (born 20 April 1948) is a Vietnamese former footballer who played as a striker.

== Career ==
Sơn played for the South Vietnam national football team and was regarded as one of the best Vietnamese strikers during the 1970s.
