= Vissai Ninh Bình FC =

Vietnamese football club

Vissai Ninh Bình
- Full name: The Vissai Cement Ninh Bình Football Club
- Founded: 1978 as Hồ Chí Minh City Police FC; 2002 as Đông Á Bank; 2005 as Đồng Tâm Long An Paint; 2007 as VinaKansai Cement Ninh Bình
- Dissolved: 2014
- Ground: Ninh Bình Stadium
- Capacity: 22,000

The Vissai Cement Ninh Bình Football Club (Vietnamese: Câu lạc bộ bóng đá Xi măng The Vissai Ninh Bình), simply known as Vissai Ninh Bình or Vissai-NB, was a professional association football club based in Ninh Bình, Vietnam. The club played in the V.League 1 from 2010 to 2014, when they withdrew due to consequences of a match-fixing scandal in the 2014 AFC Cup.

The team played at Ninh Bình Stadium.

== History ==
=== Ho Chi Minh City Police ===
Vissai-NB's roots can be traced to Ho Chi Minh City Police F.C. (HCMCP, Vietnamese: Công an Thành phố Hồ Chí Minh), owned by the Ho Chi Minh City police department. They won the V.League in 1995 while finishing as runners-up in the 1993–94, 1996, 1999–2000 and 2001–02 seasons. In 1998, the club played a nationally televised friendly match against the semi-professional San Francisco Bay Seals, winning 3–1. The match marked the first time an American soccer team had played in post-war Vietnam. HCMCP's most well-known player is Lê Huỳnh Đức, an important member of the first "golden generation" of the Vietnamese national team and is also considered one of the greatest Vietnamese footballers of all time.

=== Vissai Ninh Bình ===
In 2007, after undergoing two renamings and a move to Long An, the club was bought by Hoàng Mạnh Trường's VinaKansai cement company and moved to Ninh Bình, where they won the First Division in 2009. In preparation for the following season, their first in the top flight, Vissai-NB acquired many well-known players, including internationals such as Lê Phước Tứ, Vũ Như Thành and Phạm Văn Quyến. A domestic double followed three years later in the form of the National Cup and Super Cup, qualifying them for the AFC Cup.

==== Match-fixing scandal ====
During the 2014 season, Hoàng Mạnh Trường requested the Vietnam Football Federation (VFF) and Vietnam Professional Football (VPF) to withdraw Vissai-NB from the league due to 13 of their players' indictment for allegedly fixing a match against Malaysian side Kelantan F.C. in the 2014 AFC Cup, including captain Lê Văn Duyệt as well as internationals Nguyễn Gia Từ, Chu Ngọc Anh and Lê Văn Thắng, who was later cleared of any involvement. The club had played eight league matches and were third from bottom at the time. Following the withdrawal, all of the club's results in the league were declared null and void. However, they continued to play in the AFC Cup until their eventual elimination by Hong Kong's Kitchee SC in the quarter-finals.

== Honours ==
=== Domestic ===
League

- V.League 1
  - Winners: 1995
  - (silver) Runners-up: 1993–94, 1996, 1999–2000, 2001–02
- V.League 2 (First Division)
  - (gold) Winners: 2009

Cup

- Vietnamese National Cup
  - (gold) Winners: 1998, 2001, 2013
  - (silver) Runners-up: 2000
- Vietnamese Super Cup
  - (gold) Winners: 2013
  - (silver) Runners-up: 1999, 2001

== Performance in AFC competitions ==
Season	Competition	Round		Club	Home	Away
2014	AFC Cup	Group stage	(Hong Kong)	South China	1–1	3–1
2014	AFC Cup	Group stage	(Myanmar)	Yangon United	3–2	4–1
2014	AFC Cup	Group stage	(Malaysia)	Kelantan	4–0	3–2
2014	AFC Cup	Round of 16	(India)	Churchill Brothers	4–2	
2014	AFC Cup	Quarter-finals	(Hong Kong)	Kitchee	2–4	1–0

== Record as V.League member ==
Season	Pld	Won	Draw	Lost	GF	GA	GD	PTS	Final position	Notes
2014 V.League 1	0	0	0	0	0	0	0	0	13th	Withdrew
2013 V.League 1	20	4	6	10	23	32	−9	18	10th	Qualified for 2014 AFC Cup
2012 V-League	26	10	3	13	40	49	−9	33	8th	
2011 V-League	26	11	6	9	37	35	+2	39	4th	
2010 V-League	26	8	10	8	33	34	−1	34	11th	
