= Nguyễn Văn Dũng (footballer, born 1963) =

Vietnamese footballer

Personal information
- Full name: Nguyễn Văn Dũng
- Date of birth: 23 November 1963 (age 62)
- Place of birth: Mỹ Lộc, Nam Định, North Vietnam
- Height: 1.70 m (5 ft 7 in)
- Position: Striker

Youth career
- 1976–1982: Nam Định

Senior career*
Years	Team	Apps	(Gls)
1983–1991	Nam Định	68	(62)
1991–1992	Sông Lam Nghệ Tĩnh	18	(6)
1992–1996	Thanh Hóa	77	(28)
1996–1999	Nam Định	42	(34)
Total		205	(130)

International career
1991–1998	Vietnam	6	(3)

Managerial career
- 2019–2020: Nam Định
- 2023: Đồng Nai
- * Club domestic league appearances and goals

Nguyễn Văn Dũng (born 1963) is a retired football player of Nam Định and the Vietnam national football team. He also served as the head coach of Nam Định in 2019. When he was still playing, he often played as striker. He was a member of the Vietnamese team at a number of tournaments such as SEA Games 16 (1991) and Tiger Cup 1998.

== Biography ==
=== At the club ===
Nguyễn Văn Dũng has worn the Hà Nam Ninh Industry since the beginning of his football career. Success came, but the rambling outside of life followed him into the pitch. Reacting to the referee in 1990 caused both he (the captain) and Nam Dinh Textile to be banned for 1 year. At that time, Nam Định Textile players chased and beat referee Nguyễn Thu in the second leg against Sông Lam Nghệ Tĩnh (28-3) and the whole team was disciplined and banned from playing for 1 year. In 1991, Nguyễn Văn Dũng suddenly joined the Song Lam Nghe Tinh team of coach Nguyễn Thành Vinh and wore the captain's armband, becoming the "elder" of the group Nguyễn Hữu Thắng and Văn Sỹ Hùng. But also stayed for 1 season, Nguyen Van Dung continued to join the Thanh Hoa Police to play 4 seasons, before officially returning to Nam Dinh. He is the domestic player to win the title of V-League top scorer (4 times).

=== International career ===
Nguyễn Văn Dũng was first called up to the team in 1991 to participate in the 16 SEA Games (1991) he scored all three wins for the team (2 goals against the Philippines and 1 goal against Malaysia). However, at subsequent international tournaments, he was not called up to the national team.

Later, thanks to his excellent performance at the 1998 national football championship and winning the title of Top Scorer at the age of 35, Nguyễn Văn Dũng was suddenly called back by Mr. Riedl to the team to attend the 1998 Tiger Cup and won the medal. silver chapter. He is the oldest Vietnamese national player at this tournament. However, this was an unsuccessful tournament for him personally. Nguyễn Văn Dũng had to sit on the bench in most matches but was started in the starting line-up of the Vietnamese team in the final against Singapore because striker Văn Sỹ Hùng was red carded in the semi-final match. previous end. But Nguyễn Văn Dũng did not show much in the match where Vietnam finished 0–1.
