= Cong An Ho Chi Minh City FC (1979) =

Vietnamese football club

Công an Thành Phố Hồ Chí Minh
- Full name: Hồ Chí Minh City Police Football Club
- Founded: 1979
- Dissolved: 2002 (become Dong A Bank)
- Ground: Thống Nhất Stadium, Hồ Chí Minh City, Vietnam
- Capacity: 25,000

Cong An Ho Chi Minh City FC (Vietnamese: Công An Thành Phố Hồ Chí Minh), also known Ho Chi Minh City Police, was a Vietnamese football club based in Ho Chi Minh City. They were champions in the 1995 season of the V-League, Vietnam's top-level association football league. They placed as runners-up in the 1993–94, 1996, 1999–2000, and 2001–02 seasons. Star striker Lê Huỳnh Đức, who later went on to lead Đà Nẵng F.C. to win the 2009 V-League championship as manager, played for the club from 1992 through 2000. In 1998, the team played a nationally televised friendly match against the semi-professional San Francisco Bay Seals, winning 3–1. The match marked the first time an American professional soccer team had played in post-war Vietnam. In 2025, Ho Chi Minh City Police FC was re-established from the transfer of Ho Chi Minh City FC.

== Continental record ==
All results list Cong An Ho Chi Minh City's goal tally first.

Season	Competition	Round	Club	Home	Away	Aggregate
1996–97	Asian Club Championship	First round	(Malaysia) Johor	0–1	1–1	1–2
1999-2000	Asian Cup Winners' Cup	First round	(Maldives) New Radiant	1–0	3–1	4–1
1999-2000	Asian Cup Winners' Cup	Second round	(Hong Kong) South China	1–1	0–3	1–4
2001-02	Asian Cup Winners' Cup	Second round	(China) Chongqing Lifan	0–1	1–8	1–9

=== Performance in AFC competitions ===
- Asian Club Championship: 1 appearance
  1996–97: First round
- Asian Cup Winners' Cup: 2 appearances
  1999–2000: Second round
  2001-02: Second round

== Honours ==
=== National competitions ===
League

- V.League 1
  - Champions (1): 1995
  - Runners-up (4): 1993–94, 1996, 1999–2000, 2001–02

Cup

- Vietnamese Cup
  - Winners (2): 1998, 2001
  - Runners-up (1): 2000
- Vietnamese Super Cup
  - Runners-up (2): 1999, 2001
- Dunhill Cup
  - Winners (1): 1997
