= An Giang FC =

Vietnamese football club

An Giang
- Full name: An Giang Football Club
- Nicknames: Đội bóng miền Tây (Western football team)
- Founded: 1976; 50 years ago
- Ground: An Giang Stadium, Long Xuyên City, An Giang, Vietnam
- Capacity: 15,200
- League: Vietnamese Third Division
- 2025: Vietnamese Third Division, 4th of 7 (Group C)
- Website: an-giang-fc.com
Home colours	Away colours

An Giang Football Club (Vietnamese: Câu lạc bô Bóng đá An Giang), simply known as An Giang F.C. and previously known as Hung Vuong An Giang, is a professional football club, based in An Giang Province, Vietnam.

The team was established in 1976 at the city of Long Xuyen in the An Giang province. The team has been a established side since the 1980 and has achieved 3rd place finished in the 1987 V-League and 1990 V-League respectively. The team also participate in the 1995-96 Asian Cup Winners Cup (now known as AFC Champions League), marking their continental competition debut.

== Honours ==
=== National competitions ===
League

- V.League 1:

(bronze) Third place : 1987, 1990

- V.League 2:

(bronze) Third place : 2007, 2013

== Current squad ==
Updated 4 January 2022

Note: Flags indicate national team as defined under FIFA eligibility rules; some limited exceptions apply. Players may hold more than one non-FIFA nationality.

No.	Pos.	Nation	Player
1	GK	VIE	Nguyễn Mạnh Cường
4	DF	VIE	Võ Nguyễn Phương Duy
5	DF	VIE	Nguyễn Phan Thế Lam
6	MF	VIE	Võ Hoàng Uy
8	MF	VIE	Võ Đình Lâm
9	FW	VIE	Phạm Ngô Tấn Tài
10	FW	VIE	Hà Kiên Cường
11	MF	VIE	Nguyễn Văn Văn
12	MF	VIE	Lê Tuấn Anh
14	MF	VIE	Nguyễn Ngọc Sơn
16	FW	VIE	Nguyễn Văn Vinh
17	MF	VIE	Mai Lê Trung Kiên
19	MF	VIE	Trương Văn Dư

No.	Pos.	Nation	Player
20	MF	VIE	Võ Văn Công
21	DF	VIE	Võ Văn Huy
22	DF	VIE	Nguyễn Cao Vỹ
23	MF	VIE	Radostin Nguyen
26	DF	VIE	Nguyễn Văn Trọng
27	DF	VIE	Nguyễn Trí Tân
28	MF	VIE	Tống Văn Hợp
29	DF	VIE	Ngô Kim Long
30	GK	VIE	Phạm Hoàng Đang
31	GK	VIE	Đoàn Thanh Nhã
34	MF	VIE	Lê Hữu Phước
47	FW	VIE	Nguyễn Kim Nhật
66	DF	VIE	Nguyễn Hoàng Duy
77	DF	VIE	Âu Dương Quân

== Kit suppliers and shirt sponsors ==
Period	Kit manufacturer	Shirt sponsor
2020–present	Egan	

== Performance in AFC competitions ==
- Asian Cup Winners' Cup: 1 appearance

1995–96: First Round

Season	Competition	Round		Club	Home	Away
1995–96	Asian Cup Winners' Cup	First round	(Malaysia)	Sabah FA	1–0	0–3
