= 1989 V-League =

Vietnam National A1 League
- Season: 1989
- Dates: 5 March – 28 May
- Champions: Đồng Tháp (1st title)
- Relegated: CN Việt Trì Vĩnh Phú; GTVT Hải Hưng; Sở Công Nghiệp TP.HCM
- Matches: 210
- Goals: 460 (2.19 per match)
- Top goalscorer: Hà Vương Ngầu Nại (16 goals)

The 1989 Vietnam National A1 League was the 8th season of the National Football Championship in Vietnam, played from 5 March until 28 May 1989.

This season marked a record number of participating teams with 32 teams. This was also the last season of the National A1 League as the highest level football league in Vietnam. The 1989 season would select 18 teams with the highest level to form a new division, the National Elite Football Championship from the 1990 season.. The other 11 teams would continue to compete in the National A1 League and the bottom 3 teams would be relegated to the A2 League. Therefore, this season is also called "split division".

== First phase ==
32 teams are divided over three groups playing a single round robin. The top 7 teams of each group advance to the second phase, and the bottom team of each group would relegate to the 1990 National A2 League. From this season, the draw limit system was removed.

=== Group A ===
Pos	Team	Pld	W	D	L	GF	GA	GD	Pts	Qualification
1	Hải Quan	10	4	5	1	11	6	+5	13	Qualify for Second phase
2	Điện Hải Phòng	10	4	5	1	8	5	+3	13	Qualify for Second phase
3	An Giang	10	3	6	1	14	10	+4	12	Qualify for Second phase
4	Tiền Giang	10	4	4	2	10	8	+2	12	Qualify for Second phase
5	Công An Hà Nội	10	3	5	2	13	7	+6	11	Qualify for Second phase
6	Phú Khánh	10	3	5	2	13	9	+4	11	Qualify for Second phase
7	Tổng Cục Đường Sắt	10	3	5	2	12	9	+3	11	Qualify for Second phase
8	Quân Khu 3	10	2	6	2	7	6	+1	10	
9	Công An Quảng Nam-Đà Nẵng	10	2	5	3	7	7	0	9	
10	Gò Dầu	10	2	1	7	6	15	−9	5	
11	GTVT Hải Hưng	10	0	3	7	1	20	−19	3	Relegation the National A2 League

Source: VFF

=== Group B ===
Pos	Team	Pld	W	D	L	GF	GA	GD	Pts	Qualification
1	Quảng Nam-Đà Nẵng	9	3	6	0	12	7	+5	12	Qualify for Second phase
2	Sông Lam Nghệ Tĩnh	9	4	3	2	15	12	+3	11	Qualify for Second phase
3	Long An	9	4	3	2	12	11	+1	11	Qualify for Second phase
4	Công Nhân Nghĩa Bình	9	3	4	2	8	5	+3	10	Qualify for Second phase
5	Than Quảng Ninh	9	3	4	2	7	6	+1	10	Qualify for Second phase
6	Công An Hải Phòng	9	3	3	3	12	9	+3	9	Qualify for Second phase
7	Công An TP.HCM	9	3	3	3	10	7	+3	9	Qualify for Second phase
8	Đồng Tháp	9	3	3	3	11	9	+2	9	
9	Quân Khu Thủ Đô	9	2	3	4	6	9	−3	7	
10	Sở Công Nghiệp TP.HCM	9	0	2	7	2	20	−18	2	Relegation the National A2 League

Source: VFF

=== Group C ===
Pos	Team	Pld	W	D	L	GF	GA	GD	Pts	Qualification
1	Cảng Sài Gòn	10	6	4	0	20	7	+13	16	Qualify for Second phase
2	Dệt Nam Định	10	5	3	2	15	12	+3	13	Qualify for Second phase
3	CNXD Hà Nội	10	5	3	2	11	12	−1	13	Qualify for Second phase
4	Quân Đội	10	4	4	2	7	3	+4	12	Qualify for Second phase
5	Lâm Đồng	10	3	5	2	13	10	+3	11	Qualify for Second phase
6	Đồng Nai	10	4	2	4	12	8	+4	10	Qualify for Second phase
7	Công An Thanh Hóa	10	4	2	4	12	13	−1	10	Qualify for Second phase
8	Cảng Hải Phòng	10	3	3	4	10	14	−4	9	
9	Công An Hà Bắc	10	2	3	5	11	11	0	7	
10	Quân Khu 7	10	2	3	5	10	14	−4	7	
11	CN Việt Trì Vĩnh Phú	10	0	2	8	7	24	−17	2	Relegation the National A2 League

Source: VFF

== Second phase ==
24 teams are divided over three groups. The three group winners and the best group runners-up advance to the final round. The bottom team of each group would remain at the 1990 National A1 League, while the remaining teams would qualify for the 1990 All-Vietnam National League.

Matches that ended in draw after 90 minutes would move to the penalty shoot-outs, with the winning team receiving 2 points, while the losing team gets 1 point.

Sông Lam Nghệ Tĩnh withdrew before the Second phase to compete in an international tournament in Laos, and was replaced by Đồng Tháp in Group 2. While Quảng Nam-Đà Nẵng declared forfeit after one matchday after the team went through a road accident.

=== Group 1 ===
Pos	Team	Pld	W	PKW	PKL	L	GF	GA	GD	Pts	Qualification
1	Công An Hà Nội	6	5	0	1	0	7	3	+4	16	Qualify for Final round & Promotion to the National Elite Football Championship
2	Long An	6	1	2	3	0	7	7	0	10	Promotion to the National Elite Football Championship
3	Công An Thanh Hóa	6	2	1	1	2	8	8	0	9	Promotion to the National Elite Football Championship
4	Hải Quan	6	2	1	1	2	7	7	0	9	Promotion to the National Elite Football Championship
5	Tổng Cục Đường Sắt	6	2	1	1	2	6	6	0	9	Promotion to the National Elite Football Championship
6	CNXD Hà Nội	6	1	2	0	3	10	10	0	7	Promotion to the National Elite Football Championship
7	Công An TP.HCM	6	0	1	1	4	7	11	−4	3	

Source: VFF

=== Group 2 ===
Pos	Team	Pld	W	PKW	PKL	L	GF	GA	GD	Pts	Qualification
1	Đồng Tháp (Q)	5	2	2	0	1	6	3	+3	10	Qualify for Final round & Promotion to the National Elite Football Championship
2	Dệt Nam Định	5	2	2	0	1	7	5	+2	10	Promotion to the National Elite Football Championship
3	An Giang	5	1	2	1	1	9	8	+1	8	Promotion to the National Elite Football Championship
4	Tiền Giang	5	1	0	4	0	5	7	−2	7	Promotion to the National Elite Football Championship
5	Công An Hải Phòng	5	0	2	2	1	7	8	−1	6	Promotion to the National Elite Football Championship
6	Đồng Nai (R)	5	0	1	2	2	4	7	−3	4	

Source: VFF
(Q) Qualified to the phase indicated; (R) Relegated

=== Group 3 ===
Pos	Team	Pld	W	PKW	PKL	L	GF	GA	GD	Pts	Qualification
1	Quân Đội	5	3	2	0	0	8	2	+6	13	Qualify for Final round & Promotion to the National Elite Football Championship
2	Điện Hải Phòng	5	2	2	1	0	9	6	+3	11	Qualify for Final round & Promotion to the National Elite Football Championship
3	Cảng Sài Gòn	5	2	1	2	0	9	5	+4	10	Promotion to the National Elite Football Championship
4	Công Nhân Nghĩa Bình	5	1	1	1	2	9	13	−4	6	Promotion to the National Elite Football Championship
5	Lâm Đồng	5	0	0	3	2	3	8	−5	3	Promotion to the National Elite Football Championship
6	Phú Khánh	5	0	1	0	4	3	7	−4	2	
7	Quảng Nam-Đà Nẵng	0	0	0	0	0	0	0	0	0	Withdrew

Source: VFF

== Final round ==
=== Semi-finals ===
Công An Hà Nội	0–1	Quân Đội

Đồng Tháp	0–0	Điện Hải Phòng
Penalties
	4–3

=== Third place match ===
Công An Hà Nội	2–1	Điện Hải Phòng

=== Final ===
28 May 1989

Quân Đội	0–1	Đồng Tháp
		Phạm Anh Tuấn 68'

Hàng Đẫy Stadium, Hanoi
Referee: Đỗ Đình Hùng

Vietnam National A1 League
champions

1st title
