= 2008 V-League =

V-League
- Season: 2008
- Dates: 6 January – 24 August
- Champions: Bình Dương F.C.
- Runner up: Đồng Tâm Long An F.C.
- Relegated: Hòa Phát; Hà Nội ACB; Boss Bình Định F.C.
- 2009 AFC Champions League: Bình Dương F.C.
- Top goalscorer: Almeida (Da Nang F.C.)

The 2008 V-League was the 25th season of Vietnam's national football league and the 8th as a professional league. The league was held from January 6, 2008 to August 24, 2008. Petro Vietnam was the league sponsor for the second season (Since 2007).

Bình Dương F.C. won their second titles in this season.

== League table ==
Pos	Team	Pld	W	D	L	GF	GA	GD	Pts	Qualification or relegation
1	Becamex Bình Dương (C)	26	14	5	7	31	18	+13	47	Qualification for 2009 AFC Champions League qualifying play-off
2	Đồng Tâm Long An	26	13	6	7	51	36	+15	45	
3	Xi Măng Hải Phòng	26	12	8	6	46	25	+21	44	
4	SHB Đà Nẵng	26	12	6	8	43	33	+10	42	
5	Cảng Sài Gòn	26	11	6	9	34	34	0	39	
6	Khatoco Khánh Hòa	26	10	9	7	34	29	+5	39	
7	Hoàng Anh Gia Lai	26	11	6	9	35	33	+2	39	
8	Thể Công	26	10	8	8	28	28	0	38	
9	Sông Lam Nghệ An	26	10	7	9	45	35	+10	36 (Note: Sông Lam Nghệ An were deducted 1 point due to the chaos in Vinh Stadium at matchday 18 vs Hải Phòng.)	
10	Thanh Hóa	26	8	9	9	35	32	+3	33	
11	Đạm Phú Mỹ Nam Định	26	9	4	13	24	32	−8	31	
12	Bình Định (R)	26	6	10	10	31	48	−17	28	Promotion/relegation playoffs
13	Hà Nội ACB (R)	26	4	7	15	26	48	−22	19	Qualification for AFC Cup 2009 Group stage (Note: As the Vietnamese Cup 2008 winner)
14	Hòa Phát Hà Nội (R)	26	2	9	15	26	48	−22	15	Relegation to Vietnam First Division

Updated to match(es) played on August 24, 2008. Source:
Rules for classification: 1) points; 2) goal difference; 3) number of goals scored.
(C) Champions; (R) Relegated

== Top scorer ==
Pos.	Player	Club	Goals
1	(Brazil) Almeida	Đà Nẵng F.C.	23
2	(Brazil) Antonio Carlos	Đồng Tâm Long An F.C.	21
3	(Brazil) Flemingdo De Jesus	Xi Măng Hải Phòng FC	17
4	(Brazil) Jesuel M. Trindade	Thép Miền Nam - Cảng Sài Gòn	16
5	(Vietnam) Nguyễn Ngọc Thanh	Xi Măng Hải Phòng FC	12
5	(Vietnam) Tran Duc Duong	Nam Định F.C.	12

== Awards ==
=== Monthly awards ===
Month	Club of the Month	Coach of the Month		Player of the Month	
Month	Club of the Month	Coach	Club	Player	Club
January	Xi Măng Hải Phòng	(Vietnam) Vương Tiến Dũng	Xi Măng Hải Phòng	(Vietnam) Nguyễn Ngọc Thanh	Xi Măng Hải Phòng
February	TCDK Sông Lam Nghệ An	(Vietnam) Nguyễn Văn Thịnh	TCDK Sông Lam Nghệ An	(Brazil) Jesuel M. Trindade	Cảng Sài Gòn
March	TCDK Sông Lam Nghệ An	(Vietnam) Nguyễn Văn Thịnh	TCDK Sông Lam Nghệ An	(Brazil) Almeida	SHB Đà Nẵng
April	Becamex Bình Dương	(Vietnam) Lê Thụy Hải	Becamex Bình Dương	(Brazil) Jesuel M. Trindade	Cảng Sài Gòn
May	Đồng Tâm Long An	(Hungary) Gyorrgy Galhidi	Thể Công	(Brazil) Gustavo D. Dourado	Đồng Tâm Long An
July	SHB Đà Nẵng	(Vietnam) Lê Huỳnh Đức	SHB Đà Nẵng	(Brazil) Almeida	SHB Đà Nẵng
August	Becamex Bình Dương	(Vietnam) Lê Thụy Hải	Becamex Bình Dương	(Brazil) Elelnildo De Jesus	Xi Măng Hải Phòng

=== Dream Team ===
- Manager (Vietnam) Vương Tiến Dũng (Xi Măng Hải Phòng)

Goalkeepers	Defenders	Midfielders	Forwards
(Czech Republic) Sihavy Michal (Thể Công)	(Vietnam) Đào Văn Phong (Khatoco Khánh Hòa) (Vietnam) Vũ Như Thành (Becamex Bình Dương) (Brazil) Luiz Fabiano (Xi Măng Hải Phòng) (Vietnam) Huỳnh Quang Thanh (Becamex Bình Dương)	(Vietnam) Phạm Thành Lương (Hà Nội ACB) (Brazil) Leandro (Xi Măng Hải Phòng) (Brazil) Rafael Marquez (Thể Công) (Vietnam) Phan Thanh Phúc (SHB Đà Nẵng)	(Brazil) Antonio Carlos (Đồng Tâm Long An) (Brazil) Almeida (SHB Đà Nẵng)

== Play-off ==
28 August 2008
15:30

Đồng Tháp F.C.	1–0	Boss Bình Định F.C.
Quý Sửu 63'	Report

Thống Nhất Stadium
Attendance: 5000
Referee: Dương Văn Hiền
