= Jose Almeida (footballer) =

Brazilian footballer (born 1979)

José Almeida
Personal information
- Full name: José Emídio de Almeida
- Date of birth: 18 November 1979 (age 46)
- Place of birth: Curitiba, Brazil
- Height: 1.88 m (6 ft 2 in)
- Position: Striker

Senior career*
Years	Team	Apps	(Gls)
2000–2002	Canto do Rio		
2000	→ Racing Ferrol (loan)		
2002	Sao Cristóvão		
2002	Bragantino		
2003	Sao Cristóvão		
2003–2004	Serra Macaense		
2004	Ansar		
2004–2005	Entrerriense		
2005	Ceres FC		
2005	Teresópolis		
2006–2009	SHB Đà Nẵng	62	(58)
2011–2013	Navibank Sài Gòn	19	(8)
2014–2016	Quảng Nam	37	(8)
- * Club domestic league appearances and goals

José Emídio de Almeida (born 18 November 1979) is a former Brazilian professional footballer who played primarily as a forward, best known for his prolific career in the Vietnamese V.League 1 during the late 2000s. Standing at 1.88 meters tall and weighing 85 kg, Almeida was famous for his exceptional heading ability, which powered many of his goals through crosses and set pieces.

Almeida's journey to prominence began after early stints in Brazil, a training period at Spanish Segunda División club Racing Ferrol, and a brief spell with Lebanese side Al Ansar FC. He arrived in Vietnam in late 2005 for a trial at SHB Đà Nẵng (then Da Nang FC), where he initially faced rejection from coach Lê Thụy Hải but was signed in 2006 as an injury replacement. Over four seasons with the club (2006–2009), he scored 14 goals in his debut year to help finish seventh, claimed the top scorer title in 2007 with 16 goals (mostly headers), and set a then-record 23 goals in 2008 while earning Best Foreign Player honors both years.In 2009, despite a mid-season injury, he contributed to SHB Đà Nẵng's V.League championship alongside striker Gastón Merlo.

Later in his career, Almeida played for Navibank Sài Gòn in 2011 and had a short stint with Quảng Nam FC in 2014, amassing a total of 68 goals in the V.League. Injuries and age eventually curtailed his form, leading to retirement, but his double top-scorer achievement and role in ending SHB Đà Nẵng's trophy drought cemented his legacy as one of the league's most impactful foreign imports.

== Biography ==
=== Early life ===
José Emídio de Jesus de Almeida was born on 18 November 1979, in Rio de Janeiro, Brazil, though some sources list his birthplace as Curitiba. Details on his family background and education remain limited in available records. As of 2007, he had a wife and a three-year-old daughter.

=== Physical attributes and playing position ===
José Almeida possessed a large physical presence on the football pitch, standing at 1.88 m (6 ft 2 in) tall and weighing 85 kg during his career. (Note: Some earlier reports list 1.92 m and 74 kg.)

His primary position was as a forward, where he excelled in aerial duels and heading, often scoring a significant portion of his goals through powerful headers— approximately seven out of every ten in his debut V.League phase— leveraging his height to dominate in the opposition's penalty area. This physical prowess made him a classic target man, focusing on poaching opportunities from crosses and long balls rather than intricate footwork, as his ball control with his feet was noted to be somewhat limited. Throughout his career, Almeida rarely ventured out of the box to support build-up play, instead adopting a tactical role centered on goal-scoring efficiency by remaining positioned to capitalize on service from teammates.

== Club career ==
=== Career in Brazil ===
José Emidio de Almeida, commonly known as José Almeida, was born on 18 November 1979 in Rio de Janeiro, Brazil, where he developed his early football skills in the competitive local environment. His documented professional career in Brazil began in 2000 with Canto do Rio, a club from Rio de Janeiro state competing in regional leagues.

In 2002, Almeida played for Sao Cristóvão, another Rio-based team, and briefly joined Bragantino in São Paulo during the same year, showcasing his versatility across state competitions. He returned to São Cristóvão in 2003 before moving to Serra Macaense, where he remained until 2004, followed by a stint with Entrerriense later that year. By 2005, he featured for Ceres FC and Teresópolis, both regional outfits in Rio de Janeiro, navigating the challenges of lower-division football that often limited exposure and stability for emerging talents.

These experiences in Brazil's state leagues provided Almeida with foundational match practice as a centre-forward but offered few opportunities for national prominence, contributing to his decision to pursue international prospects. Comprehensive statistics from this era are limited, underscoring the incomplete records typical for players in Brazil's non-elite divisions prior to his relocation abroad in 2005.

=== Arrival and tenure in Vietnam ===
José Almeida arrived in Vietnam in 2006, signing with SHB Đà Nẵng to play as a foreign striker in the V.League 1. His recruitment exemplified the V.League's strategy of importing international talent, particularly from South America, to raise the technical quality and competitiveness of Vietnamese club football during the mid-2000s.

Almeida rapidly established himself as a pivotal figure in the league, forming a dynamic attacking partnership with Argentine forward Gastón Merlo under coach Lê Huỳnh Đức. Over his initial four seasons with SHB Đà Nẵng (2006–2009), he scored 58 goals in 62 matches, earning recognition as the league's best foreign player in 2007 and 2008. His prolific scoring and consistent performances highlighted his successful integration into the V.League 1's physical and tactical demands, contributing significantly to SHB Đà Nẵng's title challenges.

A serious knee injury sustained in 2009 forced Almeida out of action, leading to his absence for the entire 2010 V.League season and marking a significant gap in his career. He staged a comeback in 2011 with Navibank Sài Gòn, where he continued as a reliable goal threat until 2013, before another brief hiatus preceded his final stint with Quảng Nam from 2014 to 2016.

==== SHB Đà Nẵng ====
Jose Almeida joined SHB Đà Nẵng in 2006, marking the beginning of his most prolific period in Vietnamese football as a key striker for the club. Over his four-year tenure from 2006 to 2009, he made 62 appearances and scored 58 goals in the V.League 1, establishing himself as one of the league's most dangerous forwards. His arrival bolstered the team's attacking options, contributing significantly to their rise as a competitive force in domestic competitions.

In his debut season of 2006, Almeida quickly adapted to the V.League, netting 14 goals and helping SHB Đà Nẵng secure a mid-table finish while showcasing his finishing ability. The following year, 2007, saw him claim the top scorer title with 16 goals, a feat that highlighted his consistency and importance to the team's offensive strategy. His partnership with other foreign players enhanced SHB Đà Nẵng's goal output, laying the groundwork for future successes. By 2008, Almeida peaked with an exceptional campaign, scoring 23 goals to win the Golden Boot award and earning recognition as one of the league's best players that season.

Almeida's contributions extended into 2009, where, despite dealing with an injury that limited his participation early in the season, he played a role in SHB Đà Nẵng's triumphant double winning both the V.League 1 title and the Vietnamese National Cup. The club's V.League victory qualified them for the 2010 AFC Champions League, underscoring the impact of Almeida's goal scoring prowess during his time there. His tenure ended after the 2009 season, as he departed the club amid recovery from injury, paving the way for a brief hiatus before rejoining the V.League with another team.

==== Navibank Sài Gòn ====
Almeida joined Navibank Sài Gòn in 2011 following his departure from SHB Đà Nẵng, transitioning to a club seeking to bolster its attacking options in the V.League 1. As an experienced striker in his early 30s, Almeida provided tactical depth and leadership to a mid-table side, though his role was affected by the physical demands of the league and his advancing age.

In the 2011 season, Navibank Sài Gòn finished 8th in the V.League 1 with 34 points from 26 matches (9 wins, 7 draws, 10 losses), scoring 37 goals while conceding an equal number. Almeida contributed 6 goals during this campaign, helping the team maintain a competitive edge in the midfield standings despite defensive vulnerabilities.

The following year, 2012, saw the club secure 7th place with 35 points (8 wins, 11 draws, 7 losses), netting 32 goals in 26 games; Almeida's output diminished amid ongoing challenges, reflecting a shift from his prolific earlier years.

By 2013, Almeida's stint coincided with significant off-field turmoil for Navibank Sài Gòn, which competed as XM Xuân Thành Sài Gòn before being excluded from the league after 20 matches due to financial and administrative issues, with all results annulled. Injuries and declining form further limited his impact as an aging forward, marking a transitional phase in his career with reduced scoring contributions compared to his dominant spell at SHB Đà Nẵng.

==== Quảng Nam ====
Almeida joined QNK Quảng Nam in April 2014 following a three-week trial period, where he impressed head coach Vũ Quang Bảo despite concerns over his physical condition at age 35. Signed as a replacement for the injured foreign striker David, Almeida brought valuable experience from his previous stints in the V.League 1, including two Golden Boot wins with SHB Đà Nẵng in 2007 and 2008. The club hoped his proven goal scoring ability would bolster their attack in their debut season in the top flight after promotion from V.League 2 the previous year.

Almeida's tenure with Quảng Nam spanned 2014 to 2016, during which he provided scoring support and leadership to a developing squad, helping the team establish stability in V.League 1, finishing 8th in both 2014 and 2015, and improving to 5th place in 2016—a strong showing for a relatively new entrant. As a veteran forward, Almeida's aerial prowess and positioning, though diminished by recurring injuries and age, offered tactical insight to younger players, aiding the club's growth amid the competitive demands of the league.

This period marked the winding down of Almeida's professional career, as injuries that had plagued him since 2009 limited his explosiveness, shifting his role toward mentorship and team equilibrium rather than prolific scoring. He retired following the 2016 season, concluding a notable chapter in Vietnamese football with Quảng Nam FC as his final club.

== Achievements ==
=== Individual ===
- V-League Best foreign player: 2007, 2008.
- V-League Top scorer: 2007, 2008
