= 2015 Vietnamese National Football Third League =

Vietnamese National Football Third League
- Season: 2015
- Promoted: Hà Nội T&T B Viettel B An Giang; PVF
- Relegated: None
- Matches played: 24
- Goals scored: 52 (2.17 per match)

The 2015 Vietnamese National Football Third League was the 11th season of the Vietnamese National Football Third League. The season began on 17 November 2015 and finished on 10 December 2015.

== Rule ==
In this season, there were 10 teams divided in two groups in qualifying stage according to geographic region. Two best teams in each group qualified to final stage. In final stage, 4 teams played three matches:

- Match 1: Group A winner vs Group B runner-up
- Match 2: Group B winner vs Group A runner-up
- Match 3: Match 1 loser vs Match 2 loser

The winners of three matches promoted to 2016 Vietnamese National Football Second League. But in season 2016, Trẻ Đồng Nai withdrew, so the loser of match 3 also promoted.

== Team changes ==
The following teams have changed division since the 2014 season.

=== To Vietnamese Third League ===
Relegated from Vietnamese Second League

- none

=== From Vietnamese Third League ===
Promoted to Vietnamese Second League

- Mancons Sài Gòn
- Bình Định

== Qualifying stage ==
=== Group A ===
All matches played in Hà Nam Stadium, Hà Nam.

Pos	Team	Pld	W	D	L	GF	GA	GD	Pts	Qualification or relegation
1	Viettel B (C, O, P)	5	3	2	0	9	1	+8	11	Advance to final
2	Hà Nội T&T B (C, O, P)	5	3	1	1	9	6	+3	10	Advance to final
3	Xi măng Vissai Ninh Bình	5	2	2	1	7	3	+4	8	
4	Công An Nhân Dân B	5	1	3	1	4	6	−2	6	
5	Phù Đổng FC	5	1	2	2	2	4	−2	5	
6	Nam Định B	5	0	0	5	3	11	−8	0	

Source: VFF
(C) Champions; (O) Play-off winners; (P) Promoted

=== Group B ===
All matches played in Thành Long Stadium, Ho Chi Minh City.

Pos	Team	Pld	W	D	L	GF	GA	GD	Pts	Qualification or relegation
1	PVF (H, P)	3	3	0	0	11	0	+11	9	Advance to final
2	An Giang (O, P)	3	2	0	1	4	4	0	6	Advance to final
3	Cần Thơ B	3	1	0	2	1	3	−2	3	
4	Trẻ Thành Phố Hồ Chí Minh	3	0	0	3	2	11	−9	0	

Source: VFF
(H) Hosts; (O) Play-off winners; (P) Promoted

== Final round ==
=== Match 1 ===
8 December 2015
15:30

Viettel B	1–0	An Giang
Bùi Quý Trường 17'	Report

Tự Do Stadium, Huế
Attendance: 300
Referee: Mai Xuân Hùng

=== Match 2 ===
8 December 2015
18:00

PVF	0–0	Hà Nội T&T B
	Report
Penalties
	5–6

Tự Do Stadium, Huế
Referee: Lê Lưu Quang

=== Match 3 ===
10 December 2015
15:30

An Giang	1–1	PVF
Nguyễn Văn Trọng 41'	Report	Trương Văn Thái Quý 61'
Penalties
	4–2

Tự Do Stadium, Huế
Attendance: 200
Referee: Nguyễn Đình Hồng Quân
