= Đặng Trần Chỉnh =

Vietnamese footballer (born 1963)

Personal information
- Date of birth: 14 March 1963 (age 63)
- Place of birth: Nha Trang, South Vietnam
- Position: Striker

Senior career*
Years	Team	Apps	(Gls)
1984–1995	Saigon Port		

International career
- Vietnam

Managerial career
- 2003-2007: Saigon Port FC
- 2008: TDC Binh Duong (Technical director)
- 2009: Saigon Port FC
- 2009-2010: TDC Binh Duong (Technical director)
- 2010-2012: Becamex Binh Duong
- 2013: TDC Binh Duong
- 2015-2022: Becamex Binh Duong (Technical director)
- * Club domestic league appearances and goals

Đặng Trần Chỉnh (born 14 March 1963) is a Vietnamese football manager and former footballer. He spent his career playing for Saigon Port Football Club.

He was a CEO for Becamex Binh Duong in 2023.

== Early life ==
Chỉnh was born in 1963 in Nha Trang, South Vietnam. On 20 March 1974, when receiving news that the North Vietnam army had entered Da Nang, his family was evacuate to Saigon.

== Club career ==
In 1984, after making his debut for Saigon Port FC, Chỉnh scored a goal in a win against Nghia Binh Workers FC on Thống Nhất Stadium. After that success year, he won the 1984 V.League top goalscorer with 9 goals in 7 matches. From 1984-1993, he had several injuries and only comeback after called up by coach Phạm Huỳnh Tam Lang in 1993-94 V.League, then retired after the championship end.

== International career ==
He played for the Vietnam national football team.

== Managerial career ==
In 2003, he was appointed as a manager for Saigon Port to replace Pham Huynh Tam Lang after the club was relegated. With only one year, he led the team to won the V.League 2 and get promoted back to V.League 1. In 2008, he came to Binh Duong Youth Team and was then appointed as technical director for TDC Bình Dương. At the end of 2009, he returned to Saigon Port and led the team for a short time before the team dissolved. In the same year, he signed for both Binh Duong FC and TDC Binh Duong, before retired in 2022.

== See also ==
- List of one-club men in association football
