= 1993–94 V-League =

Vietnam National Elite Football Championship
- Season: 1993–1994
- Dates: 5 December 1993 – 19 May 1994
- Champions: Cảng Sài Gòn (2nd title)
- Relegated: Công An Hải Phòng; Công An Thanh Hóa; Đường Sắt VN; Tiền Giang
- Asian Club Championship: Cảng Sài Gòn
- Asian Cup Winners' Cup: An Giang
- Matches: 71
- Goals: 157 (2.21 per match)
- Top goalscorer: Bùi Sỹ Thành; Nguyễn Công Long (12 goals each)

The 1993–94 Vietnam National Elite Football Championship was the 12th season of the National Football Championship in Vietnam, played from 5 December 1993 until 19 May 1994.

== First phase ==
16 participants divided into 2 groups playing single round robin; top-4 of both moved onto the second stage.

=== Group A ===
- An Giang
- Hai Quan (Q)
- Dong Thap (Q)
- Long An (Q)
- CLB Quan Doi (Q)
- CA Hai Phong
- CA Thanh Hoa

=== Group B ===
- Cang Saigon (Q)
- CA TP.HCM (Q)
- Quang Nam-Danang (Q)
- Song Lam Nghe An
- Binh Dinh (Q)
- Song Be
- Tien Giang
- Duong Sat VN

== Second phase ==
8 participants divided into 2 groups playing single round robin; no draws; top-2 of both went to the semifinals.

=== Group 1 ===
- Long An (Q)
- CLB Quan Doi (Q)
- Binh Dinh
- Quang Nam-Danang

=== Group 2 ===
- Cang Saigon (Q)
- CA Tp.HCM (Q)
- Hai Quan
- Dong Thap

== Final round ==
=== Semi-finals ===
14 May 1994

| Long An | 1–3 | Công An TP.HCM |

15 May 1994

| Cảng Sài Gòn | 1–0 | Quân Đội |

=== Final ===
19 May 1994

| Cảng Sài Gòn | 2–0 | Công An TP.HCM |
|---|---|---|
| Nguyễn Văn Hòa 39'; Võ Hoàng Bửu 89' | Report |

Thống Nhất Stadium, Ho Chi Minh City
Attendance: 23,000

Vietnam National Elite Football Championship
Champions

2nd title
