= 2016 Vietnamese National Football Third League =

Vietnamese National Football Third League
- Season: 2016
- Champions: Phù Đổng FC
- Promoted: Phù Đổng FC; Kon Tum
- Relegated: None
- Matches played: 6
- Goals scored: 14 (2.33 per match)

The 2016 Vietnamese National Football Third League was the 12th season of the Vietnamese National Football Third League. The season began on 12 November 2016 and finished on 18 November 2016.

== Rule ==
In this season, there are 4 teams competing for 2 promotion slot to Second League. The teams play each other once in a centralised venue.

== Team changes ==
The following teams have changed division since the 2015 season.

=== To Vietnamese Third League ===
Relegated from Vietnamese Second League

- Kon Tum

=== From Vietnamese Third League ===
Promoted to Vietnamese Second League

- Hà Nội T&T B
- Viettel B
- An Giang
- PVF

== League table ==
All matches played in Hà Nội.

Pos	Team	Pld	W	D	L	GF	GA	GD	Pts	Qualification or relegation
1	Phù Đổng FC (H, P, C)	3	2	1	0	6	1	+5	7	Promotion to Second League
2	Kon Tum (P)	3	2	1	0	5	1	+4	7	Promotion to Second League
3	Nam Định B	3	1	0	2	2	6	−4	3	
4	Hà Nội T&T C	3	0	0	3	1	6	−5	0	

Source: VFF
(C) Champions; (H) Hosts; (P) Promoted

== Matches ==
=== Matchday 1 ===
12 November 2016
14:00

Nam Định B	1–3	Kon Tum
Nguyễn Hoàng Long 67'	Report	Lương Ân Tới 69'; Mai Đức Rim 75'; Nguyễn Văn Trang 87'

VFF Stadium
Referee: Hà Văn Thức

12 November 2016
16:00

Phù Đổng FC	3–1	Hà Nội T&T C
Nguyễn Công Mạnh 24'; Ngô Văn Tùng 37'; Hoàng Tuấn Anh 61'	Report	Nguyễn Văn Ngọc 55'

VFF Stadium

=== Matchday 2 ===
15 November 2016
14:00

Kon Tum	2–0	Hà Nội T&T C
Nguyễn Văn Sang 19'; Nguyễn Văn Đô 86'	Report

VFF Stadium
Referee: Ngô Đắc Tiến

15 November 2016
16:00

Nam Định B	0–3	Phù Đổng FC
	Report	Hoàng Tuấn Anh 36'; Ngô Văn Tùng 50', 53'

VFF Stadium

=== Matchday 3 ===
18 November 2016
14:00

Hà Nội T&T C	0–1	Nam Định B
	Report	Ngô Kim Long 60'

VFF Stadium
Referee: Vũ Phúc Hoan

18 November 2016
16:00

Phù Đổng FC	0–0	Kon Tum
	Report

VFF Stadium
Referee: Hà Văn Thức

== See also ==
- 2016 V.League 1
- 2016 V.League 2
- 2016 Vietnamese National Football Second League
