= Lê Mạnh Dũng =

Vietnamese footballer (born 1994)

Personal information
- Full name: Lê Mạnh Dũng
- Date of birth: 10 February 1994 (age 32)
- Place of birth: Nghệ An, Vietnam
- Height: 1.72 m (5 ft 8 in)
- Position: Midfielder

Team information
- Current team: Hải Phòng
- Number: 19

Youth career
- –2015: Sông Lam Nghệ An

Senior career*
Years	Team	Apps	(Gls)
2015–2019	Sông Lam Nghệ An	12	(0)
2015	→ Công An Nhân Dân (loan)		
2017	→ Hồ Chí Minh City (loan)	10	(0)
2019	→ Hải Phòng (loan)	10	(0)
2019–2020	Hồng Lĩnh Hà Tĩnh	8	(0)
2021–	Hải Phòng	110	(1)
- * Club domestic league appearances and goals as of 7 June 2026

Lê Mạnh Dũng (born 10 February 1994) is a Vietnamese professional footballer who plays as a midfielder for V.League 1 club Hải Phòng.

== Career ==
Born in Nghệ An, Mạnh Dũng was a youth product of the local Sông Lam Nghệ An youth academy. He was promoted to the first team in 2015, but was loaned to Công An Nhân Dân to gain more playing experience.

In October 2019, Mạnh Dũng was transferred to Sông Lam Nghệ An's rival Hồng Lĩnh Hà Tĩnh, signing a three-year contract. Due to constant injuries, he was released by the team after one season.

Mạnh Dũng then moved to Hải Phòng, where he previously played on loan in 2019. With Hải Phòng, he became an important starter and helped the club finish as runners up in the 2022 season. His contract with the club was extended in November 2022, and then again in July 2025.
