= Nguyễn Mạnh Dũng =

Vietnamese footballer

Personal information
- Full name: Nguyễn Mạnh Dũng
- Date of birth: 17 April 1981 (age 45)
- Place of birth: Kiến An, Haiphong, Vietnam
- Height: 1.83 m (6 ft 0 in)
- Position: Goalkeeper

Youth career
- 1994–1999: Hải Phòng

Senior career*
Years	Team	Apps	(Gls)
2000–2003	Hải Phòng	34	(0)
2004	Thể Công	14	(0)
2005–2008	Hòa Phát Hà Nội	21	(0)
2008–2009	Thể Công	18	(0)
2009–2011	Thanh Hóa	27	(0)
2011–2014	The Vissai Ninh Bình	47	(0)

International career
2003–2008	Vietnam	7	(0)
- * Club domestic league appearances and goals

Nguyễn Mạnh Dũng (born 29 April 1981) is a Vietnamese footballer who played as a goalkeeper. for The Vissai Ninh Bình and a member of Vietnam national football team since 2011 to 2014.
