= Vũ Văn Tư =

Vietnamese footballer (b. 1938, d. 2015)

Personal information
- Date of birth: 1938
- Place of birth: Haiphong, French Indochina
- Date of death: 10 December 2015 (aged 76–77)
- Place of death: Danang, Vietnam

Senior career*
Years	Team	Apps	(Gls)
1955–1965	Công An Hải Phòng		

Managerial career
- 1984–1987: Kon Tum-Gia Lai
- 1987–1992: Quảng Nam-Đà Nẵng
- 1991: Vietnam
- 1998: Sông Bé
- * Club domestic league appearances and goals

Vũ Văn Tư (1938 – 10 December 2015) was a Vietnamese football manager and former footballer.

== Career ==
Vũ spent his entire playing career with Công An Hải Phòng.

In 1991, he managed the Vietnam national football team to prepare for the 1991 SEA Games before resigning right before the tournament started.
