= Đặng Văn Thành =

Vietnamese footballer (born 1984)

Personal information
- Full name: Đặng Văn Thành
- Date of birth: 30 September 1984 (age 42)
- Place of birth: An Dương, Hải Phòng, Vietnam
- Height: 1.76 m (5 ft 9 in)
- Position: Forward

Team information
- Current team: Hải Phòng (head coach)

Youth career
- 1996–2002: Vicem Hải Phòng

Senior career*
| Years | Team | Apps | (Gls) |
| 2003–2010 | Vicem Hải Phòng | 65 | (8) |
| 2011–2012 | Vissai Ninh Bình | 43 | (6) |
| 2013–2014 | Đồng Nai | 22 | (2) |
| 2014–2015 | Becamex Bình Dương | 9 | (2) |

International career
| 2004–2007 | Vietnam | 7 | (2) |

Managerial career
- 2026–: Hải Phòng
- * Club domestic league appearances and goals

Đặng Văn Thành (born 30 September 1984) is a Vietnamese football manager and former footballer who plays as a forward who is currently the head coach of V.League 1 club Hải Phòng. He was a member of the Vietnam national football team from 2004 to 2007.
