= 2016 Vietnamese National Football Second League =

Vietnamese National Football Second League
- Season: 2016
- Champions: PVF
- Promoted: PVF
- Relegated: Vĩnh Long
- Matches played: 85
- Goals scored: 209 (2.46 per match)

The 2016 Vietnamese National Football Second League was the 18th season of the Vietnamese National Football Second League. The season began on 12 April 2016 and finished on 22 July 2016.

== Rule changes ==
In this season, 7 teams each group will play home & away. At the end of the qualifying round, the worst team in both two groups will be relegated to 2017 Vietnamese National Football Third League. And the top team of each group will be qualified to final round. In final round, the winner will be promoted to 2017 V.League 2.

== Team changes ==
The following teams have changed division since the 2015 season.

=== To Vietnamese Second League ===
Promoted from Vietnamese Third League

- Hà Nội T&T B
- Viettel B
- An Giang
- PVF (replace Trẻ Đồng Nai)

Relegated from V.League 2

- Công An Nhân Dân

=== From Vietnamese Second League ===
Relegated to Vietnamese Third League

- Kon Tum

Promoted to V.League 2

- Viettel
- Fico Tây Ninh
- Cà Mau

Team location in Vietnam map

== Qualifying round ==
=== Group A ===
Pos	Team	Pld	W	D	L	GF	GA	GD	Pts	Qualification or relegation
1	Bình Định	12	8	3	1	23	9	+14	27	Advance to final
2	Công An Nhân Dân	12	5	4	3	19	17	+2	19	
3	Hà Nội T&T B	12	4	5	3	15	14	+1	17	
4	Sanatech Khánh Hòa	12	4	2	6	14	17	−3	14	
5	Bình Thuận	12	2	6	4	8	11	−3	12	
6	Viettel B	12	3	3	6	13	21	−8	12	
7	Lâm Đồng	12	2	5	5	16	19	−3	11	

Source: VFF

=== Group B ===
Pos	Team	Pld	W	D	L	GF	GA	GD	Pts	Qualification or relegation
1	PVF (C, O, P)	12	7	3	2	17	8	+9	24	Advance to final
2	An Giang	12	6	4	2	11	6	+5	22	
3	Mancons Sài Gòn	12	4	4	4	18	16	+2	16	
4	Long An B	12	3	5	4	15	14	+1	14	
5	Tiền Giang	12	3	5	4	9	13	−4	14	
6	Bến Tre	12	4	2	6	14	18	−4	14	
7	Vĩnh Long (R)	12	3	1	8	17	26	−9	10	Relegated to 2017 Vietnamese Third League

Source: VFF
(C) Champions; (O) Play-off winners; (P) Promoted; (R) Relegated

== Final round ==
22 July 2016
16:00

Bình Định	0–0	PVF
	Report
Penalties
	4–5

Quảng Nam Stadium, Tam Kỳ
Attendance: 250
Referee: Nguyễn Văn Chôm

PVF promoted to 2017 V.League 2.

== See also ==
- 2016 V.League 1
- 2016 V.League 2
- 2016 Vietnamese National Football Third League
