= Nguyễn Văn Minh (footballer) =

Vietnamese footballer

Personal information
- Full name: Nguyễn Văn Minh
- Date of birth: 8 February 1999 (age 27)
- Place of birth: Hanoi, Vietnam
- Height: 1.66 m (5 ft 5 in)
- Positions: Wing-back; winger

Team information
- Current team: Hải Phòng
- Number: 29

Youth career
- 2012–2017: Hà Nội

Senior career*
Years	Team	Apps	(Gls)
2018–2022	Hà Nội	3	(0)
2018–2020	→ Hồng Lĩnh Hà Tĩnh (loan)	23	(3)
2022–	Hải Phòng	49	(3)

International career^{‡}
2019–2020	Vietnam U23	3	(0)
- * Club domestic league appearances and goals as of 7 June 2026 ‡ National team caps and goals as of 26 March 2022

Nguyễn Văn Minh (born 8 February 1999) is a Vietnamese professional footballer who plays as a winger for Hải Phòng in V.League 1.

== Honours ==
Hà Nội

- Vietnamese Super Cup: 2021
