= Lê Thụy Hải =

Vietnamese footballer and manager (1946–2021)

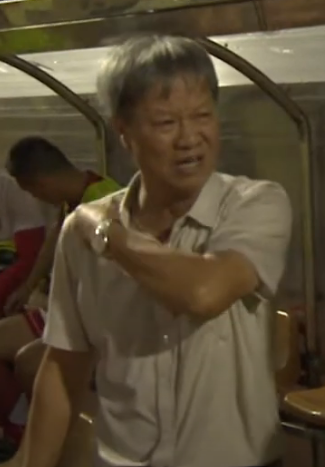
- Lê Thụy Hải in 2015

Personal information
- Full name: Lê Thụy Hải
- Date of birth: 1 January 1946
- Place of birth: Hà Đông, Hà Tây, Vietnam
- Date of death: 7 May 2021 (aged 75)
- Place of death: Hanoi, Vietnam
- Position: Midfielder

Senior career*
Years	Team	Apps	(Gls)
1965–1980	Tổng Cục Đường Sắt		

International career
- Vietnam

Managerial career
- 1995: Tổng Cục Đường Sắt (assistant)
- 1996: Quảng Ngãi
- 1997–1998: Bình Dương
- 1998: Hùng Vương An Giang
- 1999–2000: Than Cửa Ông
- 2000: Bình Dương
- 2001–2003: Thanh Hóa
- 2004: LG Hà Nội ACB
- 2005: SHB Đà Nẵng
- 2006–2008: Becamex Bình Dương
- 2009: Thể Công
- 2010: Vissai Ninh Bình
- 2010–2011: Thanh Hóa
- 2011: Becamex Bình Dương
- 2012: Hải Phòng
- 2013–2015: Becamex Bình Dương (technical director)
- 2016: FLC Thanh Hóa (technical director)
- * Club domestic league appearances and goals

Lê Thụy Hải (1 January 1946 – 7 May 2021) was a Vietnamese football player and manager.

== Playing career ==
Lê Thụy Hải played for Tổng Cục Đường Sắt between 1965 and 1980, and also played for the Vietnam national team.

== Coaching career ==
After retiring as a player in 1980, Lê Thụy Hải began his coaching career in 1995 with Tổng Cục Đường Sắt as an assistant coach. He later managed Binh Duong, leading them to 3 national championships. He also managed clubs including Da Nang, Thanh Hóa, Thể Công, Ninh Bình and Haiphong.

== Later life and death ==
He died on 7 May 2021, aged 76, due to pancreatic cancer.

== Honours ==
=== As player ===
Tổng Cục Đường Sắt

- Vietnam National A1 League: 1980

=== As manager ===
Thanh Hóa

- Vietnamese Second Division: 2001

Becamex Bình Dương

- V.League 1: 2007, 2008
- Vietnamese Super Cup: 2007, 2008

=== As technical director ===
Becamex Bình Dương

- V.League 1: 2014
- Vietnamese Cup: 2015
- Vietnamese Super Cup: 2014, 2015
- Mekong Club Championship: 2014
