= Phùng Thanh Phương =

Vietnamese footballer

Personal information
- Date of birth: 30 March 1978 (age 48)
- Place of birth: Ho Chi Minh City, Vietnam
- Height: 1.61 m (5 ft 3 in)
- Position: Winger

Senior career*
Years	Team	Apps	(Gls)
1997–2004	Công An Hồ Chí Minh City		

International career
1998	Vietnam		

Managerial career
- 2010: Navibank Sài Gòn (assistant)
- 2013: Vietnam U23 (assistant)
- 2014–2019: Hồ Chí Minh City (assistant)
- 2020: Sài Gòn (assistant)
- 2021–2022: Sài Gòn
- 2023–2025: Hồ Chí Minh City
- 2025–: Công An Hồ Chí Minh City (assistant)
- 2026–: Công An Hồ Chí Minh City (caretaker)
- * Club domestic league appearances and goals

Phùng Thanh Phương (born 30 March 1978) is a Vietnamese football former footballer who mainly played as a right winger. He is currently the manager of V.League 1 club Công An Hồ Chí Minh City.

He was part of the Vietnam national team squad that finished runners-up in the 1998 AFF Championship.

== Career ==
Born in Ho Chi Minh City, he was a youth product of Hồ Chí Minh City Police FC. He was promoted to the senior team in 1997, winning the Vietnamese Cup in 1998 and 2001. He was forced to retire from playing professional football in 2004 because he was unable to recover from a serious knee injury.

== Personal life ==
After his retirement, he attended Ho Chi Minh City University of Sport and later became the manager of Ho Chi Minh City FC and Sài Gòn.

== Honours ==
=== As player ===
Công An Hồ Chí Minh City (1979)

- Vietnamese National Cup: 1998, 2001; runners-up: 2000
- Vietnamese Super Cup runners-up: 1999, 2001

Vietnam

- AFF Championship runners-up: 1998

=== As manager ===
Công An Hồ Chí Minh City

- Vietnamese National Cup: 2025–26
