= Tien Giang FC =

Tiền Giang
- Full name: Tiền Giang Football Club
- Short name: Tiền Giang
- Founded: 1976
- Ground: Tiền Giang Stadium
- Capacity: 12,000
- Owner(s): Tiền Giang Department of Culture, Sports and Tourism
- Manager: (Vietnam) Hà Vương Ngầu Nại
- League: Currently not participating in any league
- 2024: Second Division, 5th Group B

Tien Giang Football Club (Vietnamese: Câu lạc bộ bóng đá Tiền Giang) is a Vietnamese football club based in Mỹ Tho, Tiền Giang Province. The club withdrew from the 2025 Vietnamese Second Division before the season began.

== History ==
Founded in 1976 as Tiền Giang Football Team (Đội bóng đá Tiền Giang), managed by the Tiền Giang Department of Physical Education and Sports (later renamed the Department of Culture, Sports and Tourism), the team participated in the Cửu Long football tournament for teams in the Mekong Delta region, such as Đồng Tháp, An Giang, etc. From then until the first national championship in 1980, Tiền Giang was always considered one of the representative teams with a football tradition in the region, being one of the first teams to participate in the Vietnamese National Football Championship from the first year and also the origin of many Vietnamese national players.

However, in their very first tournament in 1980, the team tasted their first bitter fruit, becoming the first team to be relegated from the country's top league. It wasn't until the 1987 season that the team returned to the top league. In the following years, the team mainly competed in the First Division and also achieved promotion a few times. In the 2005 season, with sponsorship from Konica Minolta, the team finished as runners-up and earned the right to compete in the 2006 V-League. The team also changed its name to Tiền Giang Football Club (Câu lạc bộ bóng đá Tiền Giang).

Despite having a force of talented young players, many of whom were the core of national youth teams, the team still had inconsistent and unstable match performances, lacking a long-term investment strategy. Despite officially transitioning to a semi-professional model from the 2006 season, with sponsorship from Pomina Steel Company, the team performed poorly and was relegated back to the First Division. In the following years, the team was often involved in scandals such as internal conflicts, match-fixing scandals, and frequent manager changes. Sponsors came and went, none staying for more than a season. At the end of the 2010 season, the team performed poorly and was relegated to the Second Division. Following this result, on January 27, 2011, the People's Committee of Tiền Giang province issued Decision No. 313/QD-UBND on the dissolution of Tiền Giang Football Club,. A new semi-professional team was established, formed from the core of the U21 team and 4 remaining players from the First Division team, reverting to the name Đội bóng đá Tiền Giang (Tiền Giang Football Team), competing in the National Second Division using the slot of the former Tiền Giang Football Club. Since then, Tiền Giang football has experienced many ups and downs, disappearing from the map of top-tier Vietnamese football and always "lying low" in the National Second Division, an amateur football league directly operated and managed by the Vietnam Football Federation (VFF).

According to the leadership of Tiền Giang province, the goal was to bring the team up to the National First Division by 2018,. At the same time, efforts were made to rebuild the identity of the Đội bóng đá Tiền Giang to meet the trust and expectations of the fans. However, closing the 2017 National Second Division season, Tiền Giang failed to gain promotion to the 2018 National First Division as expected, as the team was eliminated in the qualifying round, not reaching the final round, finishing 6th out of 8 teams in Group B.

In mid-2017, the People's Committee of Tiền Giang province had a policy to develop the province's sports movement by requesting the Department of Culture, Sports and Tourism to create a project for the province's sports development (later, the Department of Culture, Sports and Tourism sought opinions and was approved by the People's Committee to change it to a Football Development Plan for the province). After a period of building and gathering opinions on the draft, in early 2018, the Department of Culture, Sports and Tourism of Tiền Giang province issued the Tiền Giang Football Development Plan to 2020, with a vision to 2025. Accordingly, Tiền Giang football would be developed in a comprehensive and sustainable direction; focusing on developing grassroots football; improving the performance of the football team, gradually professionalizing football, and developing Tiền Giang football into one of the strong football centers in the Mekong Delta region. However, for some subjective and objective reasons, this plan was not approved by the Tiền Giang Provincial People's Committee.

On February 24, 2018, the Department of Culture, Sports and Tourism of Tiền Giang province and the Tiền Giang Businessmen Club in Ho Chi Minh City (TGB) signed a memorandum of understanding to support Tiền Giang Football in management, operation of a professional football club, and operating the team and club more scientifically and effectively. At the same time, the Tiền Giang Businessmen Club in Ho Chi Minh City (TGB) would mobilize units inside and outside TGB to support Tiền Giang Football with practical cooperation, promotion, and sponsorship under the motto of mutual benefit. TGB would also coordinate and support events to build and develop the image of Tiền Giang Football. However, for various objective and subjective reasons, this plan was not implemented.

Entering the 2018 National Second Division season, with the encouragement of provincial leaders and the support of TGB and some benefactors, the Tiền Giang Football Team set a goal of promotion to the National First Division (V.League 2) in this very season,. To prepare for the promotion goal, the team mainly used its own trained young players who had competed in the U19, U21, and National Second Division seasons before and invited some prominent former players from the Thép Pomina Tiền Giang U21 generation that won the 10th Thanh Niên Newspaper U21 Tournament in 2006 in Da Nang, such as Trần Quốc Anh, Huỳnh Phúc Hiệp... In addition, a few out-of-province players from academies like HAGL, Viettel, Bình Thuận... were added. Despite thorough and steady preparation with a long-term strategy, the team still played erratically, not true to form, with some players showing signs of lacking motivation, and even some former players causing conflicts with the team leadership... This caused the team's results to decline, dropping points in some home matches and in matches against weaker opponents. To stabilize the team's situation, in the middle of the second leg, the team leadership decided to terminate contracts and release all players who were undermining the team. After that, although the results improved, the team still did not have enough points to earn a spot in the promotion finals, finishing 3rd in Group B with 13 points, far behind the 2nd-placed team in the group, An Giang, by 09 points. Thus, the Tiền Giang Football Team had a disappointing season despite the high hopes of the local fans, who came to the stadium to cheer enthusiastically in large numbers.

In the 2019 - 2024 seasons, due to difficulties with personnel: most players were young, promoted from the U18, U19 lines, and borrowed from other domestic teams with weak skills and little match experience; a few experienced players were injured; and there were no sponsors... so the team leadership only set the goal of competing for the sake of gaining experience for future seasons.

At the end of the 2024 Second Division season, the team finished 5th in Group B. However, in March 2025, due to difficulties, the team sent an official letter to the VFF asking to withdraw from the 2025 Vietnamese Second Division.

== Stadium ==
Tiền Giang Stadium, located at 1A Phan Lương Trực Street, Ward 6, Mỹ Tho City, is the home ground of the Đội bóng đá Tiền Giang and is managed by the Tiền Giang Department of Culture, Sports and Tourism. The stadium meets national standards, featuring an athletics track, an electronic scoreboard, and a lighting system.

The stadium has a capacity of about 12,000 spectators, with 2 stands: A (West) and B (East), neither of which has seats installed. In 2008, the stadium was upgraded with a lighting system and an electronic scoreboard (total investment of 14.6 billion VND), along with the running track and the interior of Stand A.

The scoreboard installed is a TRANS-LUX SC-8120-2 model (size 6.35 m x 2.35 m). The lighting system was inaugurated on August 28, 2009, consisting of 4 light masts 38 m high, each holding 30 lamps (total 120 Metal Halide 2,000 W lamps), ensuring an average illuminance of 1,200 Lux. The system has 4 lighting modes (from 300 Lux to 1,200 Lux) to serve training, competition, and live broadcasting, using a separate 400 kVA transformer station.

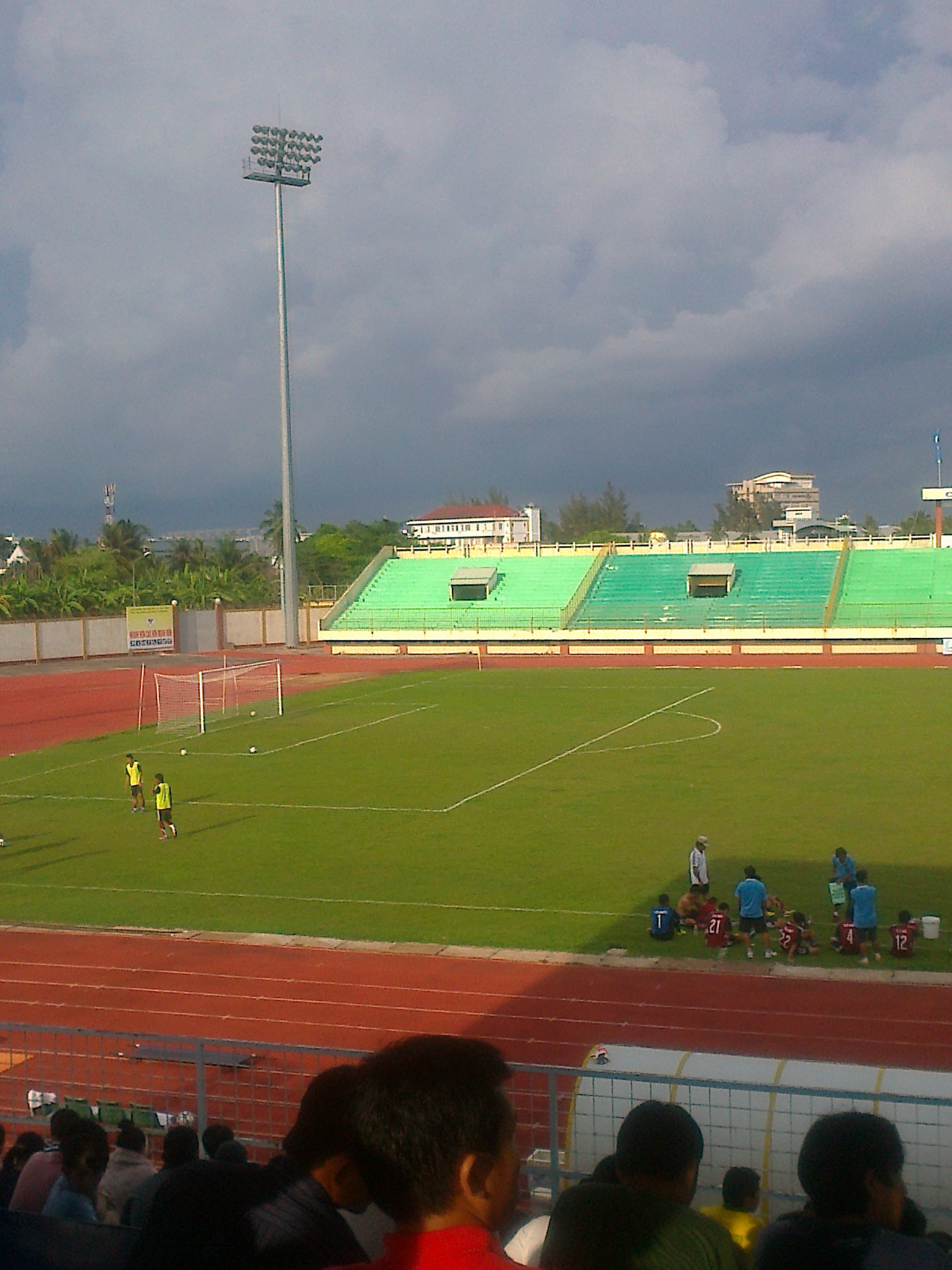

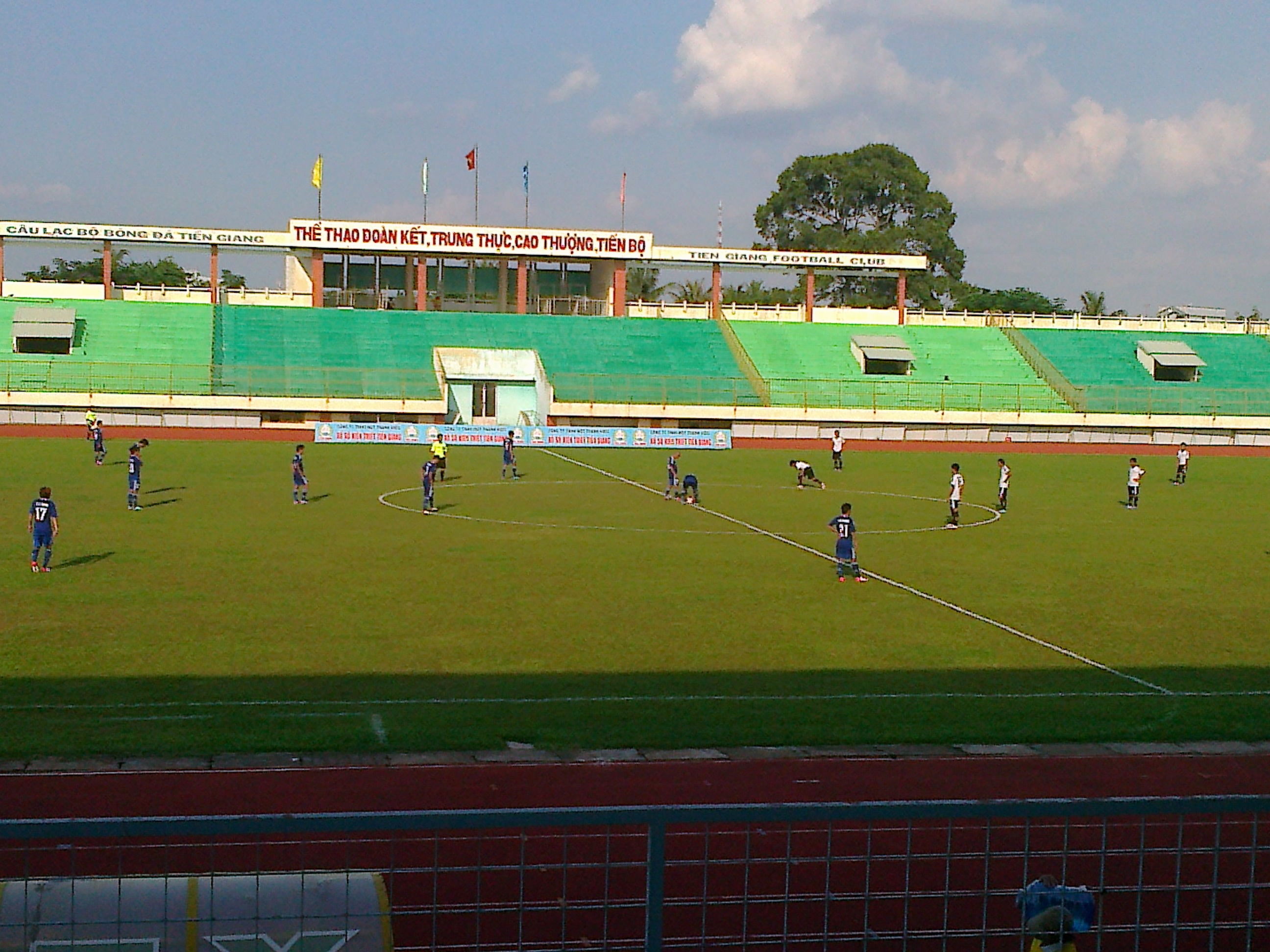

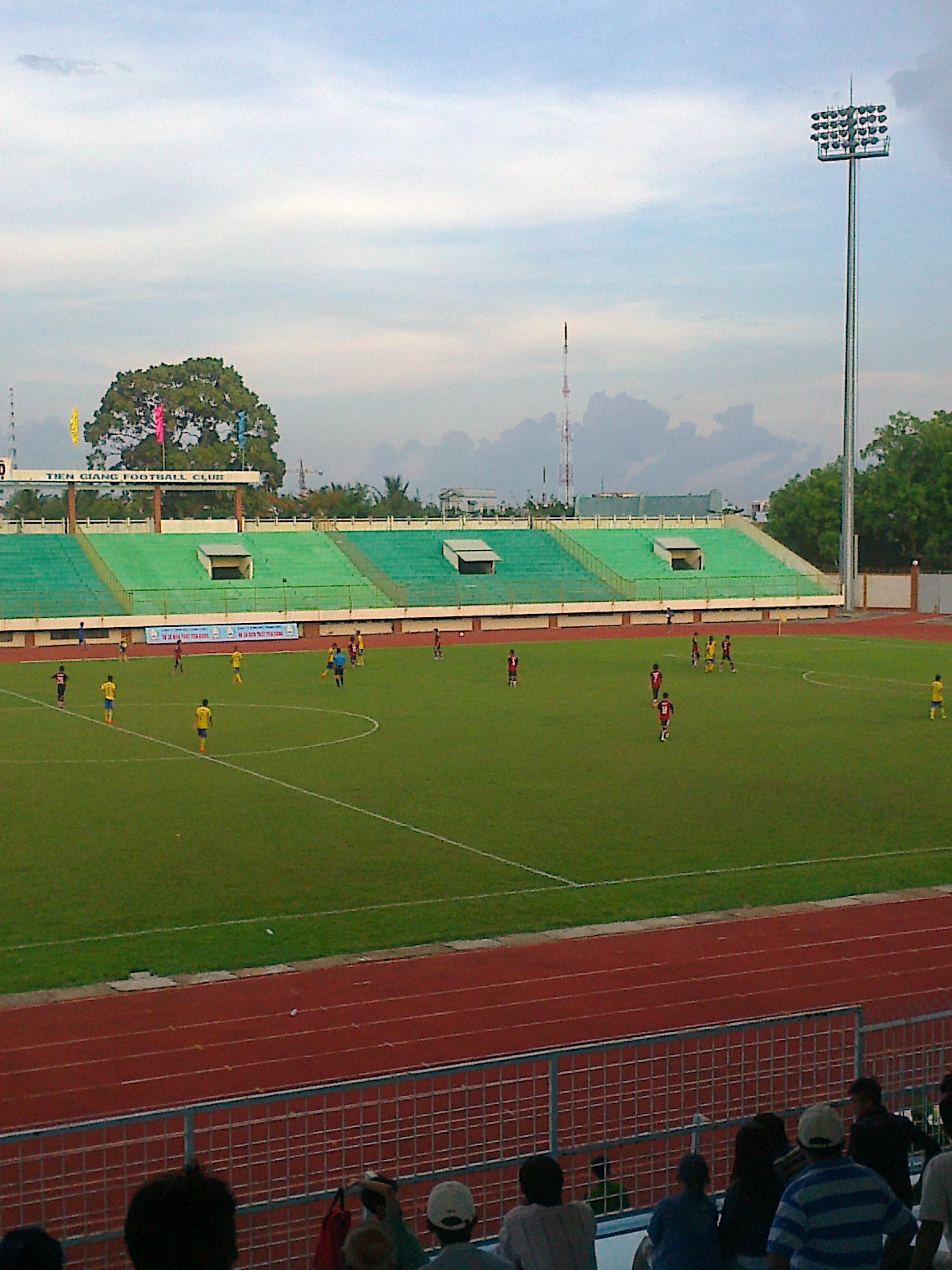

== Club names ==
- Tiền Giang Football Team: 1976 - 2005
- Thép Pomina Tiền Giang Football Club: 2006
- Giày Thành Công Tiền Giang Football Club: 2007
- SHS Tiền Giang Football Club: 2008
- Tôn Phước Khanh Tiền Giang Football Club: 2009
- Hải Nhân Tiền Giang Football Club: 2010
- Tiền Giang Football Club: 2011 - 2024

== Current squad ==
As of April 2019

Note: Flags indicate national team as defined under FIFA eligibility rules; some limited exceptions apply. Players may hold more than one non-FIFA nationality.

No.	Pos.	Nation	Player
1	GK	VIE	Lê Minh Chiến
2	DF	VIE	Đinh Tuấn Tài
4	MF	VIE	Huỳnh Trần Minh Tâm
5	DF	VIE	Nguyễn Đức Thuần
6	MF	VIE	Phạm Công Kha
7	MF	VIE	Dương Hoàng Bảo
8	MF	VIE	Nguyễn Bảo Anh
9	FW	VIE	Hồ Nhật Trường
10	FW	VIE	Nguyễn Phúc Lễ
11	FW	VIE	Huỳnh Thanh Khiêm
12	DF	VIE	Lê Tuấn Phúc
14	DF	VIE	Huỳnh Bửu Khanh
15	MF	VIE	Nguyễn Kim Hòa
16	FW	VIE	Huỳnh Phúc Hiệp

No.	Pos.	Nation	Player
17	DF	VIE	Vũ Văn Quyết
18	MF	VIE	Nguyễn Hoàng Trung Nguyên
19	FW	VIE	Dương Minh Thắng
20	MF	VIE	Nguyễn Nhĩ Khang
22	MF	VIE	Huỳnh Hoàng Vũ
23	MF	VIE	Võ Khánh Hòa
24	GK	VIE	Lê Đoàn Phát Tài
25	GK	VIE	Phạm Tấn Quyền
26	MF	VIE	Lê Ngọc Hoàng Ân
62	MF	VIE	Vũ Quang Độ
79	MF	VIE	Nguyễn Vũ Hồng Thương
97	MF	VIE	Nguyễn Sĩ Chiến
98	MF	VIE	Phạm Đình Hân

=== Notable players ===
Player who won the Best Young Player award while playing for Tiền Giang:

- (Vietnam) Nguyễn Thành Long Giang - 2006
- (Vietnam) Nguyễn Thành Long Giang - 2007

== Coaching staff ==
Position	Name
Manager	(Vietnam) Hà Vương Ngầu Nại
Assistant Manager	(Vietnam)
Assistant Manager	(Vietnam)

== Managerial history ==
Name	Period
(Vietnam) Vũ Trường Giang	2005–2006
(Vietnam) Nguyễn Kim Hằng	2006–2007
(Vietnam) Đỗ Văn Minh	2007–2009
(Vietnam) Nguyễn Văn Thịnh	2010
(Vietnam) Đỗ Văn Minh	2010
(Vietnam) Phạm Văn Rạng	2010
(Vietnam) Nguyễn Kim Hằng	2011
(Vietnam) Đỗ Văn Minh	2012–2013
(Vietnam) Phạm Văn Rạng	2013–2023
(Thailand) Issawa Singthong	2023
(Vietnam) Hà Vương Ngầu Nại	2024

== Domestic records ==
Season	League	Position	Result	Note
1980	National A1 Championship I	6th Group A	Relegated to A2	National A1 Championship was the 1st tier. National A2 Championship was the 2nd tier
1981 - 1982	National A2 Championship	-	Stayed	
1982 - 1983	National A2 Championship	-	Stayed	
1984	National A2 Championship	-	Stayed	
1985	National A2 Championship	-	Stayed	
1986	National A2 Championship	-	Promoted to A1	
1987	National A1 Championship VII	5th Group 2	Stayed	
1988	National A1 Championship not held	-	-	
1989	National A1 Championship VIII	Top 18 recognized as "top team"	Stayed	
1990	National Top Teams Championship I	6th Group C	Stayed	In 1990, VFF established the National Top Teams Championship (1st tier). A1 (2nd tier), A2 (3rd tier)
1991	National Top Teams Championship II	Reached quarter-finals	Stayed	
1992	National Top Teams Championship III	Reached quarter-finals	Stayed	
1993 - 1994	National Top Teams Championship IV	-	Relegated to A1	
1995 - 1996	National A1 Championship	-	Stayed	
1996 - 1997	National A1 Championship	-	Stayed	
1997 - 1998	National Second Division 1997-1998	-	Stayed	In 1997, VFF established the National First Division (1st tier). Second Division (2nd tier) replaced A1, Third Division (3rd tier) replaced A2
1998 - 1999	National Second Division 1998-1999	-	Stayed	
1999 - 2000	National Second Division 1999-2000	-	Stayed	
2000 - 2001	2000–01 Vietnamese First Division	6th	Stayed	In 2000, VFF established the professional V-League (1st tier). First Division (2nd tier), Second Division (3rd tier), Third Division (4th tier)
2001 - 2002	2001–02 Vietnamese First Division	5th	Stayed	
2003	2003 Vietnamese First Division	5th	Stayed	
2004	2004 Vietnamese First Division	7th	Stayed	
2005	2005 Vietnamese First Division	Runner-up	Promoted to V-League	
2006	V-League 2006	13th	Relegated to First Division	First Division is the 2nd tier of Vietnamese football
2007	2007 Vietnamese First Division	8th	Stayed	
2008	2008 Vietnamese First Division	9th	Stayed	
2009	2009 Vietnamese First Division	10th	Stayed	
2010	2010 Vietnamese First Division	13th	Relegated to Second Division	Second Division is the 3rd tier of Vietnamese football
2011	2011 Vietnamese Second Division	4th Group C	Stayed	End of 2011, Vietnam Professional Football (VPF) was established to organize professional leagues
2012	2012 Vietnamese Second Division	3rd Group C	Stayed	
2013	2013 Vietnamese Second Division	6th Group C	Stayed	Starting from 2013, the National Championship is V.League 1, First Division is V.League 2
2014	2014 Vietnamese Second Division	1st Group D	Stayed	Reached promotion finals but lost play-off match
2015	2015 Vietnamese Second Division	4th Group B	Stayed	
2016	2016 Vietnamese Second Division	5th Group B	Stayed	
2017	2017 Vietnamese Second Division	6th Group B	Stayed	
2018	2018 Vietnamese Second Division	3rd Group B	Stayed	
2019	2019 Vietnamese Second Division	4th Group B	Stayed	
2020	2020 Vietnamese Second Division	7th Group B	Stayed	
2021	2021 Vietnamese Second Division	League cancelled due to COVID-19	Position reserved	
2022	2022 Vietnamese Second Division	5th Group B	Stayed	
2023	2023 Vietnamese Second Division	5th Group B	Stayed	
2024	2024 Vietnamese Second Division	5th Group B	Stayed	
2025	2025 Vietnamese Second Division	-	Withdrew	Withdrew before the season

== Honours ==
- V.League 1:
- V.League 2:
  - Runners-up (1): 2005
- Vietnamese Cup:
- Vietnamese Super Cup:
- Vietnamese U21 National Championship:
  - Winners (1): 2006
- Tiền Giang Television Cup (THTG Cup):
  - Winners (2): 2012, 2014
