= Nguyễn Đình Hưng =

Vietnamese footballer (born 1971)

Personal information
- Date of birth: 1971 (age 54–55)
- Place of birth: Vietnam

Senior career*
Years	Team	Apps	(Gls)
1993–2000	Khatoco Khánh Hòa FC		
- * Club domestic league appearances and goals

Nguyễn Đình Hưng (born 1971) is a Vietnamese former football manager and player.

== Early life ==
He is a native of Nha Trang, Vietnam.

== Career ==
He managed Vietnamese side Haiphong FC.

== Personal life ==
He obtained an AFC B Coaching License.
