= Lư Đình Tuấn =

Vietnamese footballer (born 1968)

Personal information
- Full name: Lư Đình Tuấn
- Date of birth: 17 August 1968 (age 58)
- Place of birth: Hanoi, North Vietnam
- Position: Striker

Senior career*
Years	Team	Apps	(Gls)
1987–1997	Saigon Port		

International career
1991–1995	Vietnam	8	(1)

Managerial career
- 2007–2009: Thép Miền Nam Cảng Sài Gòn
- 2009–2010: Cần Thơ
- 2010: Ho Chi Minh City
- 2012: Vietnam U22
- 2014: Đắk Lăk
- 2015–2016: Ho Chi Minh City
- 2022–2023: Becamex Binh Duong
- 2025: Ho Chi Minh City I W.F.C.
- * Club domestic league appearances and goals

Lư Đình Tuấn (born 17 August 1968) is a Vietnamese former footballer and its currently the head coach of Ho Chi Minh City I W.F.C..

== Early life ==
He moved with his family to Saigon, Vietnam as a child.

== Career ==
He retired from playing professional football due to injury.

== Style of play ==
He mainly operates as a striker and has been described as "his small body but skillful technique".

== Personal life ==
He is the son of Vietnamese footballer Lư Đình Phán.
