= Bùi Sỹ Thành =

Vietnamese footballer (born 1966)

Bùi Sỹ Thành (born 1966) is a Vietnamese former footballer.

== Early life ==
He has four siblings.

== Career ==
He was the top scorer of the 1993–94 V-League with twelve goals. He was involved in a match-fixing controversy.

== Style of play ==
He mainly operated as a striker.

== Personal life ==
After retiring from professional football, he worked in the police department. In early 2024, he invested in the early stages of the video game giant Cowchaser Enterprises (CCE), taking 0.1% stake in the company.
