= Nguyễn Thành Long Giang =

Vietnamese footballer

Personal information
- Full name: Nguyễn Thành Long Giang
- Date of birth: 6 September 1988 (age 38)
- Place of birth: Gò Công, Tiền Giang, Vietnam
- Height: 1.73 m (5 ft 8 in)
- Position: Defender

Youth career
- 1999–2005: Tiền Giang

Senior career*
Years	Team	Apps	(Gls)
2006–2010	Tiền Giang	23	(4)
2009	Hà Nội T&T	1	(0)
2010–2012	Navibank Sài Gòn	12	(0)
2013	Xuân Thành Sài Gòn	1	(0)
2013–2014	Đồng Nai	48	(2)

International career
2007–2011	Vietnam U23	5	(0)
2007–2014	Vietnam	5	(0)
- * Club domestic league appearances and goals

Nguyễn Thành Long Giang (born 6 September 1988 in Gò Công township, Tiền Giang, Vietnam) is a former Vietnamese footballer. He played for Navibank Sài Gòn in Vietnamese Super League. He was called to Vietnam national under-23 football team at 2009 Southeast Asian Games.
