= Nam Dae-sik =

South Korean footballer

Personal information
- Date of birth: 15 October 1948
- Place of birth: South Korea
- Date of death: 20 March 2018 (aged 69)
- Place of death: South Korea

Managerial career
- Years: Team
- 1987–1996: Korea University
- 1990: South Korea U-20
- 2001: Jeonbuk
- 2003–2004: Bình Dương

Nam Dae-sik (Korean: 남대식; 15 October 1948 - 20 March 2018) was a South Korean football manager and footballer.

== Early life ==
Nam was born in 1948 in South Korea. He attended Dongbuk High School in South Korea.

== Career ==
In 1987, Nam was appointed manager of South Korean side Korea University. In 1990, he was appointed manager of the South Korea national under-20 football team. In 2001, he was appointed manager of South Korean side Jeonbuk. In 2003, he was appointed manager of Vietnamese side Bình Dương.

== Personal life ==
Nam was married. He had three daughters and a son.
