= Nguyễn Văn Thịnh =

Vietnamese football manager

Nguyễn Văn Thịnh is a Vietnamese former football manager.

== Early life ==
He played for Vietnamese side SLNA, helping the club achieve promotion.

== Career ==
He managed the Vietnam national under-20 football team.

== Personal life ==
He has been nicknamed "Thịnh đen".
