= Becamex Ho Chi Minh City FC =

Vietnamese football club

Becamex Ho Chi Minh City
- Full name: Becamex Ho Chi Minh City Football Club
- Nickname: Cơn lốc miền Đông. (The Eastern Whirlwind)
- Short name: Becamex HCMC
- Founded: 1976; 50 years ago as Sông Bé
- Ground: Gò Đậu Stadium
- Capacity: 18,250
- Owner: Becamex IDC
- Chairman: Hồ Hồng Thạch
- Head coach: Gerard Albadalejo
- League: V.League 2
- 2025–26: V.League 1, 14th of 14 (relegated)
- Website: www.becamexbinhduongfc.com
Home colours	Away colours	Third colours

Becamex Ho Chi Minh City Football Club (Vietnamese: Câu lạc bộ bóng đá Becamex Thành phố Hồ Chí Minh), simply known as Becamex HCMC, and formerly known as Sông Bé and Becamex Bình Dương, is a professional football club based in Thủ Dầu Một ward, Ho Chi Minh City. It currently plays in Vietnam's second division, the V.League 2. Their home ground is Gò Đậu Stadium.

== History ==
=== 1976–1996 ===
In 1976, the club was established as Sông Bé Football Club, named after the Bé River, a well-known river in Bình Dương Province. The first club's head coach was Đỗ Thới Vinh. In 1978, two Sông Bé teams competed in the National Division A, with Sông Bé II winning the regional championship. Afterward, the two sides were merged into one club under head coach Nguyễn Kim Phụng.

In 1994, Sông Bé won its first ever national title, the Vietnamese National Cup. One year later, however, they were relegated from the Vietnamese National First Division (the highest competition in Vietnam at that time) as punishment by the VFF after Sông Bé and 3 other clubs refused to play the relegation play-off matches. In 1996, Sông Bé and Cao Su Binh Long merged into one club which achieved promotion to the top competition that same year.

=== 1997–2001 ===
In January 1997, the club was renamed Bình Dương after Sông Bé Province was divided into two parts, Bình Dương and Bình Phước. In 1998, Bình Dương was relegated from the First Division and suffered for some years from a lack of development.

=== 2002–present ===
In 2002, Bình Duong Football Joint-stock Company was founded when Bình Dương was taken over by Bình Dương Television Broadcaster (BTV) and Becamex IDC, the strongest multi-industry economy corporation in Bình Dương. The financial backing from Becamex IDC was a huge boost for the club.

In 2003, Becamex Bình Duong officially promoted to V-League after a convincing victory at the National First Division. With the emergence of talented young players, Becamex Binh Duong quickly became a new force in V-League. In 2007, Becamex Binh Duong officially won the V.League championship.

On the afternoon of 17 August 2008, Vietnamese football pitches were once again bustling with matches in round 25 of 2008 season. Becamex Binh Duong successfully defended their championship title one round early after winning 4–0 against Boss Binh Dinh. With 3 consecutive victories at the end of the season to finish as V-League 2009 runners-up, Becamex Binh Duong was voted the Best Team of the Month in August by sports reporters nationwide with 42 points. Becamex Binh Duong continued to win the V.League championship in 2014 and 2015.

On 14 July 2025, Becamex Binh Duong changed their name to Becamex Ho Chi Minh City.

Becamex Ho Chi Minh City secure relegation to V.League 2 from next season after twenty two season at top tier due to worst performance in 2025–26.

== Logo ==
2016–2019

2021–2025

== Stadium ==
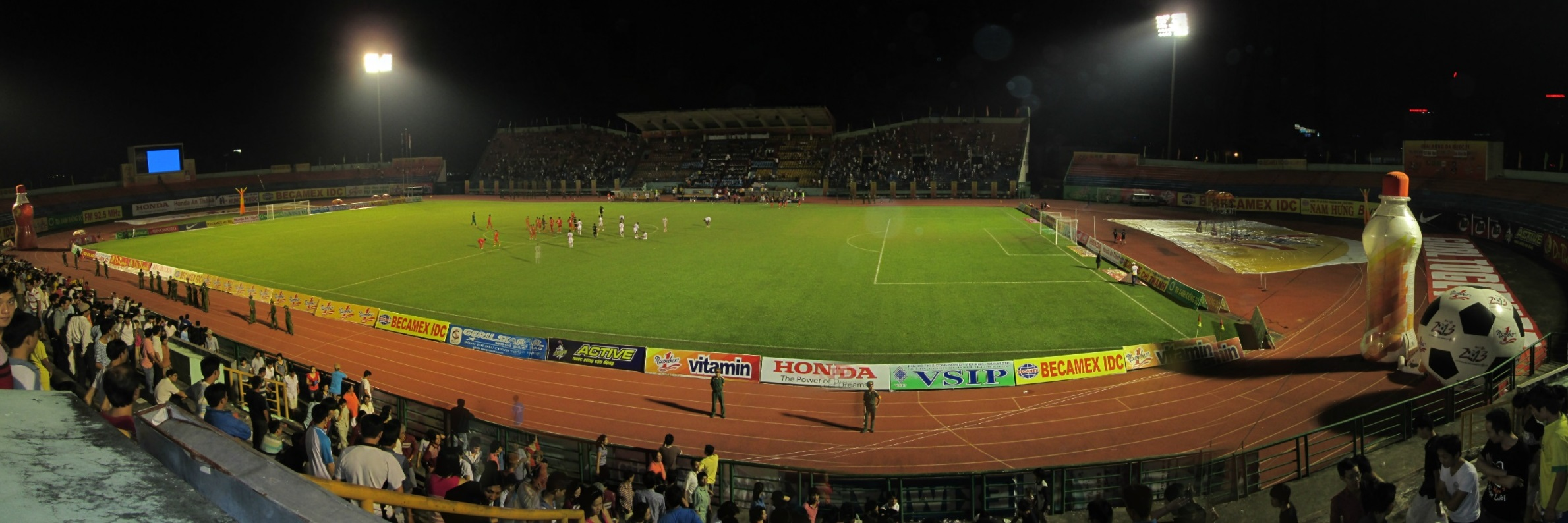
Panorama of Gò Đậu Stadium in 2013.

Gò Đậu Stadium is a multi-use stadium in Thủ Dầu Một. It is currently used primarily for football matches and is the home stadium of Becamex Bình Dương. The stadium holds 18,250 people.

== Kit manufacturers and shirt sponsors ==
Period	Kit manufacturer	Shirt sponsors
2015–2019	(Italy) Kappa	(Vietnam) Becamex
2019–present	(Vietnam) Kamito	(Vietnam) Becamex

== Current squad ==
As of 21 August 2026

Note: Flags indicate national team as defined under FIFA eligibility rules; some limited exceptions apply. Players may hold more than one non-FIFA nationality.

No.	Pos.	Nation	Player
2	DF	VIE	Ngô Tùng Quốc (captain)
5	DF	VIE	Nguyễn Văn Hạnh
6	MF	VIE	Nguyễn Thanh Khôi
7	FW	VIE	Nguyễn Trần Việt Cường
8	MF	VIE	Phan Thanh Hậu
9	FW	VIE	Hà Đức Chinh
10	MF	VIE	Võ Hoàng Minh Khoa
11	FW	VIE	Bùi Vĩ Hào
12	MF	VIE	Trần Hoàng Hưng
16	MF	VIE	Nguyễn Thành Nhân
17	FW	VIE	Bùi Văn Bình
18	MF	VIE	Đặng Anh Tuấn
19	DF	VIE	Adriano Schmidt (on loan from Công An HCMC)
20	MF	VIE	Nguyễn Trọng Hùng

No.	Pos.	Nation	Player
21	DF	VIE	Trần Đình Khương
23	MF	VIE	Cao Văn Triền
25	GK	VIE	Trần Minh Toàn
27	MF	VIE	Nguyễn Khắc Vũ
28	DF	VIE	Nguyễn Hùng Thiện Đức
33	DF	VIE	Nguyễn Thành Kiên
34	DF	VIE	Trần Như Tân
37	MF	VIE	Trần Văn Công
38	FW	VIE	Nguyễn Trọng Sơn
39	FW	NGR	Samson Olaleye
46	GK	VIE	Phan Minh Thành
48	GK	VIE	Nguyễn Hữu Lợi
89	MF	VIE	Châu Ngọc Quang
99	FW	BRA	Daniel dos Anjos

=== Other players under contract ===
Note: Flags indicate national team as defined under FIFA eligibility rules; some limited exceptions apply. Players may hold more than one non-FIFA nationality.

No.	Pos.	Nation	Player
3	DF	VIE	Trần Hoàng Bảo
23	MF	VIE	Hà Trung Hậu
35	DF	VIE	Nguyễn Ngọc Chiến
79	FW	VIE	Nguyễn Như Ý

=== Out on loan ===
Note: Flags indicate national team as defined under FIFA eligibility rules; some limited exceptions apply. Players may hold more than one non-FIFA nationality.

No.	Pos.	Nation	Player

== Coaching staff ==
Position	Name
Head coach	(Spain) Gerard Albadalejo
Assistant coach	(Vietnam) Huỳnh Kesley Alves (Vietnam) Nguyễn Tăng Tuấn
Goalkeeper coach	(Spain) Fran Mateu
Fitness coach	(Andorra) Christopher Hernández
Doctor	(Vietnam) Đặng Hiếu Hảo (Vietnam) Lê Anh Nhật
Logistics officer	(Vietnam) Nguyễn Ngọc An (Vietnam) Nguyễn Đắc Phương
Interpreter	(Vietnam) Hoàng Nhật Hoàng
Team manager	(Vietnam) Hồ Hồng Thạch

== Managers by years ==
Name	Nat	Period	Achievements
Đỗ Thới Vinh	(Vietnam)	1976–1978	
Nguyễn Kim Phụng	(Vietnam)	1978–1997	
Vũ Văn Tư	(Vietnam)	1998	
Trần Bình Sự	(Vietnam)	2002–2003	
Nam Dae-sik	(South Korea)	2003–2004	
Mai Ngọc Khoa	(Vietnam)	2004	
Vương Tiến Dũng	(Vietnam)	2004–2005	
Đoàn Minh Xương	(Vietnam)	2005–2006	
Lê Thụy Hải	(Vietnam)	2006–2008	2007 V-League; 2007 Vietnamese Super Cup; 2008 V-League; 2008 Vietnamese Super Cup
Francisco Vital	(Portugal)	2008–2009	
Mai Đức Chung	(Vietnam)	2009–2010	
Đặng Trần Chỉnh (interim)	(Vietnam)	2010	
Dương Ngọc Hùng	(Vietnam)	2010	
Luis Rodrigues	(Portugal)	2010	
Dương Ngọc Hùng	(Vietnam)	2010	
Ricardo Formosinho	(Portugal)	2011	
Đặng Trần Chỉnh (interim)	(Vietnam)	2011	
Lê Thụy Hải	(Vietnam)	2011	
Đặng Trần Chỉnh (interim)	(Vietnam)	2011–2012	
Cho Yoon-hwan	(South Korea)	2012–2013	
Lê Thụy Hải	(Vietnam)	2013	
Nguyễn Minh Dũng	(Vietnam)	2013–2014	
Nguyễn Thanh Sơn	(Vietnam)	2014–2016	2014 V.League 1; 2014 Vietnamese Super Cup; 2014 Mekong Club Championship; 2015 V.League 1; 2015 Vietnamese Cup; 2015 Vietnamese Super Cup
Trần Bình Sự	(Vietnam)	2016–2018	
Trần Minh Chiến	(Vietnam)	2018–2019	2018 Vietnamese Cup
Nguyễn Thanh Sơn	(Vietnam)	2019	
Carlos Carvalho de Oliveira	(Brazil)	2019	
Nguyễn Thanh Sơn	(Vietnam)	2020	
Phan Thanh Hùng	(Vietnam)	2020–2021	
Nguyễn Thanh Sơn (interim)	(Vietnam)	2021	
Đặng Trần Chỉnh	(Vietnam)	2021–2022	
Lư Đình Tuấn	(Vietnam)	2022–2023	
Nguyễn Quốc Tuấn (interim)	(Vietnam)	2023	
Lê Huỳnh Đức	(Vietnam)	2023–2024	
Nguyễn Đức Cảnh (interim)	(Vietnam)	2024	
Hoàng Anh Tuấn	(Vietnam)	2024	
Nguyễn Công Mạnh	(Vietnam)	2024–2025	
Nguyễn Anh Đức	(Vietnam)	2025	
Đặng Trần Chỉnh (interim)	(Vietnam)	2025–2026	
Nobuhiro Ueno	(Japan)	2026	
Hứa Hiền Vinh	(Vietnam)	2026	
Gerard Albadalejo	(Spain)	2026–	

== Continental and regional record ==
=== Continental ===
All results (home and away) list Becamex's goal tally first.

Season	Competition	Round	Club	Home	Away	Aggregate
2008	AFC Champions League	Group E	(China) Changchun Yatai	0–5	1–2	4th out of 4
2008	AFC Champions League	Group E	(South Korea) Pohang Steelers	1–4	0–0	4th out of 4
2008	AFC Champions League	Group E	(Australia) Adelaide United	1–2	1–4	4th out of 4
2009	AFC Cup	Group H	(Singapore) Home United	2–0	1–2	1st out of 4
2009	AFC Cup	Group H	(Maldives) Club Valencia	3–0	5–0	1st out of 4
2009	AFC Cup	Group H	(Thailand) PEA	1–1	3–1	1st out of 4
2009	AFC Cup	Round of 16	(Malaysia) Kedah	8–2		
2009	AFC Cup	Quarter-finals	(Thailand) Chonburi	2–0	2–2	4–2
2009	AFC Cup	Semi-finals	(Syria) Al-Karamah	2–1	0–3	2–4
2010	AFC Cup	Group F	(Malaysia) Selangor	4–0	0–0	2nd out of 4
2010	AFC Cup	Group F	(Maldives) Victory Sports Club	3–0	5–0	2nd out of 4
2010	AFC Cup	Group F	(Indonesia) Sriwijaya	2–1	0–1	2nd out of 4
2010	AFC Cup	Round of 16	(Vietnam) SHB Đà Nẵng	3–4 (a.e.t.)		
2015	AFC Champions League	Group E	(China) Shandong Luneng	2–3	1–3	4th out of 4
2015	AFC Champions League	Group E	(South Korea) Jeonbuk Hyundai Motors	1–1	0–3	4th out of 4
2015	AFC Champions League	Group E	(Japan) Kashiwa Reysol	1–0	1–5	4th out of 4
2016	AFC Champions League	Group E	(China) Jiangsu Suning	1–1	0–3	4th out of 4
2016	AFC Champions League	Group E	(Japan) FC Tokyo	1–2	1–3	4th out of 4
2016	AFC Champions League	Group E	(South Korea) Jeonbuk Hyundai Motors	3–2	0–2	4th out of 4
2019	AFC Cup	Group G	(Indonesia) Persija Jakarta	3–1	0–0	2nd out of 4
2019	AFC Cup	Group G	(Philippines) Ceres–Negros	1–3	1–0	2nd out of 4
2019	AFC Cup	Group G	(Myanmar) Shan United	6–0	2–1	2nd out of 4
2019	AFC Cup	Zonal semi-finals	(Indonesia) PSM Makassar	1–0	1–2	2–2 (a)
2019	AFC Cup	Zonal finals	(Vietnam) Hà Nội	0–1	0–1	0–2

=== Regional ===
Season	Competition	Round	Club	Home	Away	Aggregate
2014	Mekong Club Championship	Semi-finals	(Cambodia) Phnom Penh Crown	5–2		
2014	Mekong Club Championship	Final	(Myanmar) Ayeyawady United	4–1		
2015	Mekong Club Championship	Semi-finals	(Cambodia) Boeung Ket Angkor	2–3		

== Season-by-season records ==
Season	Pld	Won	Draw	Lost	GF	GA	GD	PTS	Final position	Notes
1995 V-League	12	4	0	8	11	15	−4	8	6th	Relegated
1998 V-League	26	6	8	10	23	26	−3	24	13th	Relegated
2001 V-League 2	22	5	8	9	27	33	−6	23	10th	
2002 V-League 2	22	7	5	10	22	37	−15	26	9th	
2003 V-League 2	22	16	2	4	56	18	+38	50	2nd	Promoted to 2004 V-League
2004 V-League	22	7	7	8	24	24	0	28	6th	
2005 V-League	22	11	5	6	40	32	+8	38	3rd	
2006 V-League	24	11	6	7	33	25	+8	39	2nd	
2007 V-League	26	16	7	3	42	22	+20	55	Champions	Qualified for 2008 AFC Champions League
2008 V-League	26	14	5	7	32	18	+14	47	Champions	Qualified for 2009 AFC Cup
2009 V-League	26	12	7	7	49	35	+14	43	2nd	Qualified for 2010 AFC Cup
2010 V-League	26	11	4	11	48	40	+8	37	8th	
2011 V-League	26	9	9	8	40	42	−2	36	6th	
2012 V-League	26	10	6	10	32	31	+1	36	6th	
2013 V.League 1	20	6	5	9	34	35	−1	23	8th	
2014 V.League 1	22	15	4	3	53	23	+30	49	Champions	Qualified for 2015 AFC Champions League; Qualified for 2014 Mekong Club Championship
2015 V.League 1	26	16	4	6	57	33	+24	52	Champions	Qualified for 2016 AFC Champions League; Qualified for 2015 Mekong Club Championship
2016 V.League 1	26	9	7	10	39	37	+2	34	10th	
2017 V.League 1	26	6	12	8	34	30	+4	30	11th	
2018 V.League 1	26	7	12	7	39	36	+3	33	7th	Qualified for 2019 AFC Cup (national cup winners)
2019 V.League 1	26	10	6	10	32	32	0	36	4th	
2020 V.League 1	20	7	7	6	25	21	+4	28	6th	
2021 V.League 1	12	5	2	5	14	17	–3	17	6th	League was cancelled due to COVID-19
2022 V.League 1	24	7	7	10	32	41	-9	28	7th	
2023 V.League 1	18	2	9	7	19	23	-4	15	12th	
2023–24 V.League 1	26	10	5	11	33	34	-1	35	8th	
2024–25 V.League 1	26	9	5	12	31	40	-9	32	7th	
2025–26 V.League 1	26	6	6	14	31	43	-12	24	14th	Relegated to V.League 2
2026–27 V.League 2	26									

== Honours ==
=== Continental competitions ===
- AFC Cup

(bronze) Third place (1): 2009

=== Regional competitions ===
- Mekong Club Championship

(gold) Winners (1): 2014

=== National competitions ===
==== League ====
- V.League 1

(gold) Winners (4): 2007, 2008, 2014, 2015
(silver) Runners-up (2): 2006, 2009

- V.League 2

(silver) Runners-up (1): 2003

==== Cup ====
- Vietnamese National Cup

(gold) Winners (3): 1994, 2015, 2018
(silver) Runners-up (3): 2008, 2014, 2017
(bronze) Third place (1): 2024–25

- Vietnamese Super Cup

(gold) Winners (4): 2007, 2008, 2014, 2015
(silver) Runners-up (1): 2018

=== Other competitions ===
- BTV Cup

(gold) Winners (8): 2002, 2003, 2005, 2012, 2013, 2017, 2019, 2021
(silver) Runners-up (3): 2006, 2008, 2011
