= 2010 Vietnamese National Football First League =

V.League 2
- Season: 2010
- Dates: 29 January – 21 August
- Champions: Thanh Hóa

The Vietnamese National Football First League (V.League 2) is the second highest league in Vietnamese football after the V.League 1 with 14 teams competing in it.

Previous winners

Season	Champions	Runner-up	Third place
2009	XM Vissai The Ninh Bình	Hòa Phát Hà Nội	Thành phố Cần Thơ

Viettel F.C. sold their V. League slot to Thanh Hóa, to allow them to stay in the V. League after being relegated the previous season. Thanh Hóa therefore withdrew from the First Division, enforcing the league to have 13 entrants this campaign

Pos	Team	Pld	W	D	L	GF	GA	GD	Pts	Promotion or relegation
1	Thanh Hóa	0	0	0	0	0	0	0	0	Promotion
2	Ho Chi Minh City	0	0	0	0	0	0	0	0	Promotion
3	Thành phố Cần Thơ	0	0	0	0	0	0	0	0	
4	Boss Bình Định F.C.	0	0	0	0	0	0	0	0	
5	Huế F.C.	0	0	0	0	0	0	0	0	
6	Tây Ninh	0	0	0	0	0	0	0	0	
7	Quảng Ninh Hạ Long	0	0	0	0	0	0	0	0	
8	Hà Nội ACB	0	0	0	0	0	0	0	0	
9	Đồng Nai Biên Hòa	0	0	0	0	0	0	0	0	
10	Tiền Giang Mỹ Tho	0	0	0	0	0	0	0	0	
11	An Giang Long Xuyên	0	0	0	0	0	0	0	0	
12	Quảng Nam FC	0	0	0	0	0	0	0	0	
13	N/A	0	0	0	0	0	0	0	0	Relegation
14	N/A	0	0	0	0	0	0	0	0	Relegation

== See also ==
- Football in Vietnam
