= Vương Tiến Dũng =

Vietnamese footballer and coach

Personal information
- Full name: Vương Tiến Dũng
- Date of birth: 8 June 1949 (age 77)
- Place of birth: Nong Khai, Thailand
- Height: 1.75 m (5 ft 9 in)
- Position: Defender

Youth career
- 1960–1964: Thể Công

Senior career*
Years	Team	Apps	(Gls)
1965–1978	Thể Công	166	(8)

International career
?	North Vietnam	?	(?)

Managerial career
- 1998–2001: Thể Công
- 2001–2001: Cần Thơ
- 2002–2003: Vietnam Airlines
- 2003–2004: Thanh Hóa
- 2004–2005: Bình Dương
- 2005–2007: Hòa Phát Hà Nội
- 2007–2008: Hải Phòng Cement
- 2008–2009: Thể Công
- 2009–2011: Vicem Hải Phòng
- 2013–2014: Cần Thơ
- * Club domestic league appearances and goals

Vương Tiến Dũng (born 1949) is a Vietnamese former footballer and manager. After retiring from his playing career, during which he played for Thể Công (also known as the Army club) and the North Vietnamese national side, Vương turned to coaching and coached a number of Vietnamese football clubs.

== Playing career ==
Born in Thailand to parents from Bắc Giang, Vương Tiến Dũng returned to Vietnam at the age of 10. He joined Công football club in May 1965, and two years later traveled to North Korea for nearly a year of training. After returning to Vietnam in May 1968, he was selected for the North Vietnamese national squad. Vương retired from professional playing in 1978.

== Coaching career ==
After ending his playing career, Vương spent the years from 1978 to 1983 studying at the University of Military Sport in the Soviet Union. Upon his return to Vietnam, he pursued a career training young players, and in 1998 he took up the job of coaching his old team, Công. With Công, he won the Vietnamese league championship in 1998, and in early 1999 they went on to win the Super Cup after defeating the Vietnam Police football club in Hồ Chí Minh City. That same year, he took the team to the Vietnamese Under-21 championship. But he left shortly afterward, after an apparent fall out with the military.

After leaving Công, Vương went on to manage a number of clubs in the top two tiers of Vietnamese league football. In 2001, he was managing Cần Thơ, but the next year he moved back closer to his family home to manage the Vietnam Airlines football club in Hanoi (which had been formed from the former Hanoi Police football club, after the aviation corporation became independent). After his spell at Vietnam Airlines, in 2003 he signed a coaching contract with Thanh Hóa F.C.

In July 2004, Vương moved on to coach Bình Dương football club. During his first championship in charge, he took the team to the top spot, but by the end of the season Bình Dương had dropped back to the bronze medal position. The team's biggest defeat, losing 5–0 to Đà Nẵng at the Chi Lăng stadium, led to Vương's resignation after only a year with the club.

Just a month later, Vuong signed a contract with Hòa Phát Hà Nội, although many other teams were keen to attract him. At the end of the 2006 season, Hòa Phát Hà Nội were in 11th place out of 14, but were surprise winners of the Vietnam Football Cup. After this achievement, Vuong was elected the Vietnam newspapers' Football Coach of the Year for 2006. However, a disappointing 2007 season saw the team only manage to finish in 12th place out of 14, and they were eliminated in the quarter finals of the cup. This led to Vuong's resignation.

Two months later, Vuong accepted an invitation to move to Hai Phong Cement football club, where he led the team to third place in the 2008 championship. Although that was the club's best finish for many years, Vuong's contract was not extended, and the club brought in Austrian manager Alfred Riedl as coach the following year.

After a short spell back at his original club, Cong, Vuong resumed the coaching position at Hai Phong Cement football club in September 2008.

== Coaching achievements ==
- 1998: Vietnam League Championship, winner (Cong FC)
- 1999: Vietnam Super Cup, winner (Cong FC)
- 2005: Vietnam League Championship, third place (Bình Dương FC)
- 2006: Vietnam Football Cup, winner (Hòa Phát Hà Nội FC)
- 2006: Vietnamese newspapers' Football Coach of the Year, 2006
- 2008: Vietnam League Championship, third place (Hai Phong Cement FC)
