= 2007 V-League =

V-League
- Season: 2007
- Dates: 3 March – 23 September
- Champions: Bình Dương F.C.
- Runner up: Đồng Tâm Long An F.C.
- Relegated: Đồng Tháp F.C. Huda Huế
- 2008 AFC Champions League: Bình Dương F.C.
- Top goalscorer: Almeida (Da Nang F.C.)

The 2007 V-League was the 24th season of Vietnam's national football league and the 7th as a professional league.. Petro Vietnam was the league's sponsor for the first time, replacing Eurowindow.

Bình Dương F.C. won their first title in this season, beating out two-time champions Đồng Tâm Long An F.C.

== League table ==
Pos	Team	Pld	W	D	L	GF	GA	GD	Pts	Qualification or relegation
1	Becamex Bình Dương (C)	26	16	7	3	42	22	+20	55	Qualification for 2008 AFC Champions League Group stage
2	Đồng Tâm Long An	26	12	8	6	46	31	+15	44	
3	Hoàng Anh Gia Lai	26	12	5	9	40	33	+7	41	
4	Đạm Phú Mỹ Nam Định	26	10	8	8	35	31	+4	38	Qualification for 2008 AFC Champions League Group stage (Note: As the Vietnamese Cup 2007 winner)
5	SHB Đà Nẵng	26	9	10	7	33	28	+5	37	
6	Pisico Bình Định	26	10	6	10	34	36	−2	36	
7	Sông Lam Nghệ An	26	8	11	7	38	35	+3	35	
8	Cảng Sài Gòn	26	8	10	8	41	40	+1	34	
9	Khatoco Khánh Hòa	26	10	4	12	30	31	−1	34	
10	Thanh Hóa	26	8	10	8	27	30	−3	34	
11	Hà Nội ACB	26	8	7	11	30	36	−6	31	
12	Hòa Phát Hà Nội	26	7	9	10	31	41	−10	30	Promotion/relegation playoffs
13	TĐCS Đồng Tháp (R)	26	3	11	12	21	35	−14	20	Relegation to Vietnam First Division
14	Huda Huế (R)	26	4	8	14	25	44	−19	20	Relegation to Vietnam First Division

Updated to match(es) played on September 23, 2007. Source:
Rules for classification: 1) points; 2) goal difference; 3) number of goals scored.
(C) Champions; (R) Relegated

== Play-off ==
28 September 2007
15:30

Hòa Phát Hà Nội	2–1	An Giang
Williams 20', 87'		Alphonse 30' (o.g.)

Chi Lăng Stadium
Referee: Đặng Thanh Hạ
