= Phạm Huỳnh Tam Lang =

Vietnamese footballer and coach

Personal information
- Date of birth: 14 February 1942
- Place of birth: Gò Công, Cochinchina, French Indochina
- Date of death: 2 June 2014 (aged 72)
- Place of death: Ho Chi Minh City, Vietnam
- Position: Midfielder

Youth career
- 1953–1956: Ngôi Sao Chợ Lớn

Senior career*
Years	Team	Apps	(Gls)
1957–1960	Ngôi Sao Chợ Lớn		
1961	Việt Nam Thương Tín		
1962–1975	Cảnh Sát Quốc Gia		
1975–1977	Cảng Sài Gòn		

International career
1960–1975	South Vietnam		

Managerial career
- 1982–2003: Cảng Sài Gòn
- * Club domestic league appearances and goals

Phạm Huỳnh Tam Lang (14 February 1942 – 2 June 2014) was a Vietnamese football player and coach.

== Career ==
In 1966, Tam Lang captained the South Vietnam national team and won the 1966 Merdeka Cup. In the following year, he was part of the South Vietnam squad that participate in the 1967 SEAP Games, in which the team finish as runners-up. At the same year, he and Đỗ Thới Vinh were invited to the "Asian All Star" team. At club level, Tam Lang used to play for famous clubs such as AJS (which became Cảnh Sát Quốc Gia in the 1970s), and later for Cảng Sài Gòn after Vietnam's reunification.

In 1977, Tam Lang retired from his playing career and decided to pursuit a coaching career. In 1981, he was sent to Ho Chi Minh City by the Ho Chi Minh City Gymnastics Department to take an international training course in the Democratic Republic of Germany. At the end of the course, Phạm Huỳnh Tam Lang received a diploma in football coaching. In 1983, as a coach, Phạm Huỳnh Tam Lang signed for Cảng Sài Gòn, he spent much of his career at the team and won the most important trophies in his team's history. He contributed to the team's four championships in the seasons 1986, 1993-1994, 1997, 2001-2002 and two national cup championships 1992 and 2000, along with dozens of local championships in the south of Vietnam. He has also been invited by many foreign coaches to be the assistant coach of the Vietnam national football team.

In 2003, after the relegation of Cảng Sài Gòn, Tam Lang officially retired from his coaching career, ending 28 years career in the team. He created an important historical period of this team.

Tam Lang has been awarded a medal by the Asian Football Confederation for his dedication to Vietnam's and the region's football activities for 50 years. In 2013, he was awarded "Fair Play Honour" by the Ho Chi Minh City Law Journal. He was widely popular and supported by a lifetime of football and brought many noble qualities on the field.

He died of a stroke at Chợ Rẫy Hospital in Ho Chi Minh City on 2 June 2014.
