= 2015 Vietnamese National Football Second League =

Vietnamese Second Division
- Season: 2015
- Promoted: Viettel; XM Fico Tây Ninh; Cà Mau
- Relegated: Kon Tum

The 2015 Vietnamese National Football Second League was the 17th season of the Vietnamese National Football Second League.

== Team changes ==
The following teams have changed division since the 2014 season.

=== To Vietnamese Second League ===
Promoted from Vietnamese Third Division

- Mancons Sài Gòn
- Bình Định

Relegated from V.League 2

- XM Fico Tây Ninh

=== From Vietnamese Second League ===
Relegated to Vietnamese Third Division

- none

Promoted to V.League 2

- Nam Định
- Phú Yên
- Bình Phước
- Công An Nhân Dân

== League stage ==
=== Group A ===
Pos	Team	Pld	W	D	L	GF	GA	GD	Pts	Qualification or relegation
1	Viettel	12	6	5	1	16	3	+13	23	Advance to final stage
2	Bình Định	12	6	4	2	14	8	+6	22	Advance to final stage
3	Lâm Đồng	12	5	3	4	18	13	+5	18	
4	Bình Thuận	12	3	5	4	9	9	0	14	
5	Trẻ Đồng Nai	12	3	4	5	12	18	−6	13	
6	Sanatech Khánh Hòa	12	3	4	5	12	18	−6	13	
7	Kon Tum	12	1	5	6	9	21	−12	8	Relegation to 2016 Vietnamese Third Division

Source: VFF

=== Group B ===
Pos	Team	Pld	W	D	L	GF	GA	GD	Pts	Qualification or relegation
1	XM Fico Tây Ninh	12	6	5	1	21	9	+12	23	Advance to final stage
2	Cà Mau	12	6	3	3	18	15	+3	21	Advance to final stage
3	Mancons Sài Gòn	12	5	4	3	15	11	+4	19	
4	Tiền Giang	12	3	6	3	14	11	+3	15	
5	Vĩnh Long	12	3	4	5	11	15	−4	13	
6	Bến Tre	12	3	3	6	11	18	−7	12	
7	Long An	12	2	3	7	9	20	−11	9	

Source: VFF

== Final stage ==
=== Semi-finals ===
1 July 2015
16:00

Viettel	3-0	Cà Mau
Trương Văn Thiếc 24'; Dương Văn Hào 47'; Trần Hoài Sơn 72'	Report

Nha Trang Stadium
Attendance: 500
Referee: Lê Bá Hoài
1 July 2015
18:30

XM FICO Tây Ninh	2-0	Bình Định
Lâm Hải Đăng 29'; Trần Văn Hén 57'	Report

Nha Trang Stadium
Attendance: 600
Referee: Nguyễn Đình Tiến Dũng

=== Play-off ===
3 July 2015
16:00

Cà Mau	1-1	Bình Định
Nguyễn Thanh Lợi 80'	Report	Nguyễn Văn Ton 73'
Penalties
	4-2

Nha Trang Stadium
Attendance: 500
Referee: Nguyễn Đình Thái
