= Hà Vương Ngầu Nại =

Vietnamese football manager and former footballer

Personal information
- Full name: Hà Vương Ngầu Nại
- Date of birth: 26 November 1964 (age 61)
- Place of birth: Saigon, South Vietnam
- Height: 1.70 m (5 ft 7 in)
- Positions: Midfielder; striker

Youth career
- 1977–1982: Cảng Sài Gòn

Senior career*
Years	Team	Apps	(Gls)
1983–1995	Cảng Sài Gòn	271	(74)

International career
1991–1993	Vietnam	13	(1)

Managerial career
- 2007–2008: Quảng Ngãi
- 2010–2018: PVF
- * Club domestic league appearances and goals

Hà Vương Ngầu Nại (born 26 November 1964) is a Vietnamese football manager and former footballer who last managed PVF.

== Career ==
Hà spent his entire playing career with Cảng Sài Gòn, where he was regarded as one of their most important players for years, and played for the Vietnam national football team and worked as manager after retiring from professional football.
