= Haiphong FC =

Association football club in Vietnam

Hải Phòng
- Full name: Hải Phòng Football Club
- Nicknames: Hoa Phượng Đỏ. (The Flamboyant); Thuỷ triều đỏ. (The Red Tide); Đội bóng đất Cảng. (The Portland)
- Short name: HPFC
- Founded: 1952; 74 years ago as Voi Vàng Đất Cảng; 1957; 69 years ago as Công An Hải Phòng
- Ground: Lach Tray Stadium
- Capacity: 30,000
- Owner: Haiphong Football JSC
- Chairman: Văn Trần Hoàn
- Head coach: Đặng Văn Thành
- League: V.League 1
- 2025–26: V.League 1, 7th of 14
- Website: fc-haiphong.com
Home colours	Away colours	Third colours

Hải Phòng Football Club (Vietnamese: Câu lạc bộ Bóng đá Hải Phòng), is a Vietnamese professional football club based in Haiphong. Hải Phòng is one of the most successful football teams in Vietnam with 6 major titles, including three North Vietnam national titles, two Vietnamese National Cup and one Vietnamese Super Cup titles. They are currently playing in V.League 1 and their home ground is Lạch Tray Stadium.

The club is considered to have originated from its predecessor Công An Hải Phòng. It is the only team in the city of Haiphong that survived after government subsidies were removed.

== History ==
In 1906, football was brought to North Vietnam by the French during the colonization. Hai Phong at that time was one of the first localities to have football clubs, including Olympique Haiphong, Arrow (La Flèche)., High School (Radium), Youth of Tonkin (La Jeunesse Tonkinoise) and The Sea Golden Elephant (Voi Vàng Đất Cảng).

It was reported that in 1909 two teams Haiphong included Le Duong Dap Cau (Legion Dap Cau) and Olympique Haiphong faced each other. In the first leg, Olympique Haiphong won 2-1 but the second match lost 1–8. In the 1930s, Haiphong football was known for the Nguyen Lan and Nguyen Thong duo, whose brought much success to the city's team. However, after the Vietnamese August Revolution of 1945, all precedent Haiphong teams were disbanded.

In 1952, Voi Vàng Đất Cảng Football Club was established. After Haiphong's liberation from France in 1955, the club name was changed to Hải Phòng. Two years later, in 1957, the team changed their name again to Công An Hải Phòng, being under the management of the Haiphong Municipal Police. Before the Vietnamese reunification in 1975, Haiphong played in the North Vietnam A1 League and managed to win the league 3 times. After the reunification, they were a regular member of the Vietnamese top flight but failed to win a national league title. In 1995, the club won their first Vietnamese National Cup title.

After the 2001–02 season, when the team promoted to the Vietnamese First Division, the team's model was no longer suitable for the new professional football system that was newly formed in Vietnam, Hai Phong Municipal Police had decided to transfer the team to the Sports Department of Haiphong city. In the early years under the new management, the team's name has changed over the seasons due to sponsorship reasons, a result of frequent swifts in the team's main sponsor. This model was not a success as the team was financially unstable and consistently got relegated from the top tier after their promotions.

On 16 October 2007, the Sports Department of Haiphong transferred the team's ownership to the Haiphong Cement company, renaming the club Hải Phòng Cement. Under the new owner, the club had a larger budget and became a more competitive side in the Vietnamese top flight as they finished in the third place. In the following season, the team gained wide attention after successfully in sign Brazilian World Cup 2002 winning member Denílson to compete for the title. In the 2011 V-League season, Haiphong Cement was renamed Vicem Hải Phòng following the club's sponsorship deal with the Vietnam Cement Industry Corporation.

At the end of the 2012 V-League season, the team finished at the bottom of the table, suffering a relegation to the 2013 V.League 2. However, the team purchased Khatoco Khanh Hoa's spot in the top division as the latter disbanded due to financial difficulties, thus maintain the top flight in the 2013 season.

In 2014, the team's owner Vicem company transferred the club to the Haiphong People's Committee, changing the team name to the current Hải Phòng Football Club. Despite the lack of financial strength as the previous seasons, the team won the 2014 Vietnamese Cup, their second title since 1975 despite poor results in the league.

In the 2016 season, Haiphong led the league for most of the season but couldn't maintain their good form at the end of the season and lost their title race to rival Hanoi T&T, with both having the same number of points and Haiphong only lost on goal differences.

In 2022, Haiphong once again finished as league runner-up, gaining them a qualification to the 2023–24 AFC Champions League preliminary round. There where they defeated Hong Kong Rangers 4–1 in the preliminary round before but lost to Korean club Incheon United 1–3 in the play-off round. This defeat however transferred them to the 2023–24 AFC Cup, marking their first participation in a main phase of a continental competition.

== Name ==
- Voi Vòng Đất Cảng (1952–1955)
- Hải Phòng (1955–1957)
- Công An Hải Phòng (1957–2002)
- Thép Việt-Úc Hải Phòng (2002–2004)
- Mitsustar Hải Phòng (2005)
- Mitsustar Haier Hải Phòng (2006)
- Vạn Hoa Hải Phòng (2007)
- Xi Măng Hải Phòng (2008–2010)
- Vicem Hải Phòng (2011–2012)
- Xi Măng Vicem Hải Phòng (2013)
- Hải Phòng (2014–present)

== Stadium ==
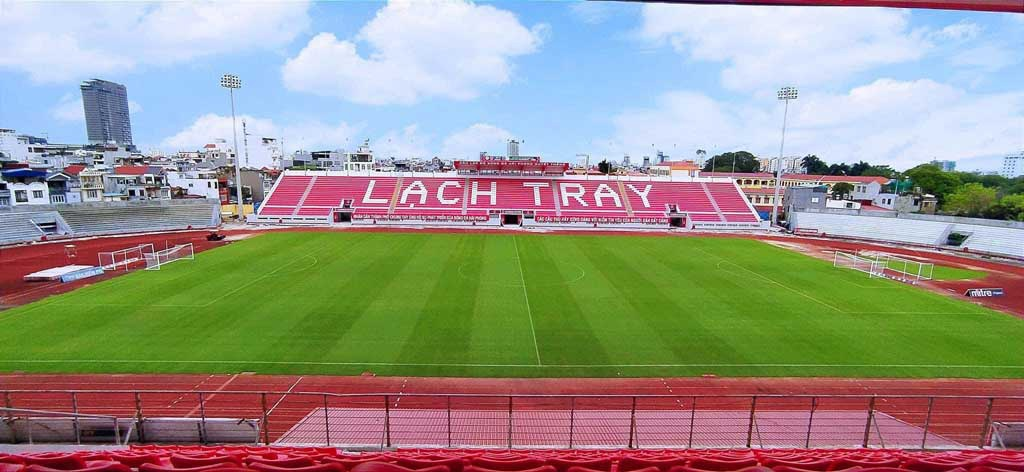
View of the Lạch Tray Stadium

The Lạch Tray Stadium is a multi-use stadium in Haiphong, Vietnam. The stadium holds approximately 30,000 spectators. The stadium was built in 1957 from a horse farm (a yard belong to the Lạch Tray Horse Club). A year later, on 1 January 1958, the first international football match took place at Lạch Tray Stadium, between the Hải Phòng city XI and a Chinese team.

== Kit manufacturers and shirt sponsors ==
Period	Kit manufacturer	Shirt sponsor	Shirt sponsor 2
1998	(Thailand) Grand Sport	Rennie	none
2000–2001	(Germany) Adidas	Highlands Coffee (V-League) Pepsi (National Cup) Tiger Beer	Samsung SyncMaster
2001–2002	(Germany) Adidas	Strata (V-League) Samsung (National Cup) Tiger Beer	Samsung SyncMaster
2003	(Thailand) Grand Sport	Thép Việt - Úc	none
2004	none	Vinausteel-HP	none
2005	none	Mitsustar	none
2006	none	Mitsustar	Haier
2007	none	Vạn Hoa	none
2008–2015	none	Vicem	none
2016–2017	(England) Mitre	none	none
2018	(England) Mitre	Asanzo	none
2019	(Japan) Jogarbola	none	none
2020	(Japan) Jogarbola	VTC3	none
2021–2024	(Japan) Jogarbola	none	none
2024–present	(Italy) Kappa	Mansion Sports	LPBank

Home kits
2012	2013(1)	2013(2)	2016–2018	2022

Away kits
2012	2013	2016–2018	2022

Third kits
2013	2016–2018	2022

== Current squad ==
As of 3 September 2026

Note: Flags indicate national team as defined under FIFA eligibility rules; some limited exceptions apply. Players may hold more than one non-FIFA nationality.

No.	Pos.	Nation	Player
2	DF	VIE	Hứa Quốc Thắng
5	DF	VIE	Đặng Tuấn Phong (on loan from Thể Công-Viettel)
7	MF	VIE	Hoàng Trọng Duy Khang (on loan from PVF)
9	FW	SRB	Milan Makarić
10	MF	CAN	Camilo Vasconcelos
11	MF	VIE	Hồ Minh Dĩ
14	MF	VIE	Nguyễn Anh Tuấn
15	MF	VIE	Nguyễn Ngọc Tú (on loan from Thể Công-Viettel)
17	MF	VIE	Nguyễn Thái Học
19	MF	VIE	Lê Mạnh Dũng
20	GK	VIE	Trần Đình Minh Hoàng
21	MF	VIE	Trần Gia Hưng (on loan from PVF)
27	MF	VIE	Hoàng Văn Tuyến
28	DF	VIE	Huỳnh Tuấn Vũ (on loan from Hoàng Anh Gia Lai)

No.	Pos.	Nation	Player
30	GK	VIE	Nguyễn Văn Toản
31	DF	VIE	Nguyễn Hữu Thái Bảo (on loan from Thể Công-Viettel)
32	GK	VIE	Phạm Thành Long
35	DF	VIE	Vũ Quốc Anh (on loan from Thể Công-Viettel)
36	MF	VIE	Nguyễn Công Phương (on loan from Thể Công-Viettel)
39	DF	VIE	Nguyễn Vũ Tín
45	MF	VIE	Nguyễn Thành Đồng
68	DF	VIE	Nguyễn Văn Minh
77	MF	VIE	Nguyễn Hữu Sơn
91	FW	VIE	Nguyễn Văn Anh
95	FW	CMR	Joel Tagueu
97	MF	GEQ	Esteban Obiang
98	MF	VIE	Hoàng Thế Tài
99	MF	UGA	Joseph Mpande

=== Other players under contract ===
Note: Flags indicate national team as defined under FIFA eligibility rules; some limited exceptions apply. Players may hold more than one non-FIFA nationality.

No.	Pos.	Nation	Player
18	MF	VIE	Vũ Hoàng Thảo
25	MF	HAI	Bicou Bissainthe

== Club officials ==
Position	Name
Head coach	(Vietnam) Đặng Văn Thành
Assistant coach	(Vietnam) Ngô Anh Tuấn (Vietnam) Nguyễn Mạnh Dũng
Goalkeeper coach	(Vietnam) Bùi Vinh Quang
Doctor	(Vietnam) Phan Thanh Hải (Vietnam) Vũ Hồng Quang
Physiotherapist	(Vietnam) Đoàn Kim Đại
Interpreter	(Vietnam) Nguyễn Hoàng Lê

== Continental record ==
Season	Competition	Round	Club	Home	Away	Aggregate
1996–97	Asian Cup Winners' Cup	First round	(Macau) Lam Pak	(w/o)^{1}		
1996–97	Asian Cup Winners' Cup	Second round	(Japan) Nagoya Grampus	1–1	0–3	1–4
2023–24	AFC Champions League	Preliminary stage	(Hong Kong) HK Rangers	4–1 (a.e.t.)		
2023–24	AFC Champions League	Play-off stage	(South Korea) Incheon United	1–3 (a.e.t.)		
2023–24	AFC Cup	Group stage	(Indonesia) PSM Makassar	3–0	1–1	2nd
2023–24	AFC Cup	Group stage	(Singapore) Hougang United	4–0	1–2	2nd
2023–24	AFC Cup	Group stage	(Malaysia) Sabah	3–2	1–4	2nd

^{1} Lam Pak withdrew before 1st leg

== Performance in AFC competitions ==
- AFC Champions League: 1 appearance

2023–24: Play-off round

- AFC Cup: 1 appearance

2023–24: Group stage

- Asian Cup Winners' Cup: 1 appearance

1996–97: Second round

== Record in the V.League 1 ==
Season	Pld	Won	Draw	Lost	GF	GA	GD	PTS	Final position	Notes
2000–01 V-League	18	8	1	9	28	30	−2	25	6th	
2001–02 V-League	18	5	4	9	19	26	−7	19	12th	
2008 V-League	26	12	8	6	46	25	+21	44	3rd	
2009 V-League	26	11	3	12	29	35	−6	36	7th	
2010 V-League	26	14	3	9	41	34	+7	45	2nd	
2011 V-League	26	7	9	10	28	40	−12	30	12th	
2012 V-League	26	3	5	18	27	59	−32	14	14th	Initially relegated to 2013 V.League 2 but maintained after purchasing Khanh Hoa's spot
2013 V.League 1	20	7	5	8	39	28	+11	26	6th	
2014 V.League 1	22	5	6	11	16	27	−11	21	10th	
2015 V.League 1	26	11	8	7	31	28	+3	41	6th	
2016 V.League 1	26	15	5	6	47	32	+15	50	2nd	
2017 V.League 1	26	11	5	10	35	33	+2	38	7th	
2018 V.League 1	26	9	7	10	26	26	0	34	6th	
2019 V.League 1	26	8	6	12	33	44	−11	30	12th	
2020 V.League 1	18	5	4	9	15	25	−10	19	12th	
2021 V.League 1	12	4	2	6	7	15	−8	14	12th	Season was cancelled due to COVID-19
2022 V.League 1	24	14	6	4	39	26	+13	48	2nd	Qualified for the 2023–24 AFC Champions League preliminary round
2023 V.League 1	20	6	8	6	20	23	−3	26	6th	
2023–24 V.League 1	26	9	8	9	42	39	+3	35	7th	
2024–25 V.League 1	26	9	8	9	29	27	+2	35	6th	

== Head coaching history ==
- 1952–1968: (Vietnam) Nguyễn Lan
- 1968–1974: (Vietnam) Nguyễn Trọng Lộ
- 1974–1992: --unknown--
- 1992–1998: (Vietnam) Trần Bình Sự
- 1998–2001: (Vietnam) Mai Trần Hải
- 2001–2004: (Vietnam) Trần Văn Phúc
- 2005: (Brazil) Luis Alberto
- 2006: (Germany) Laszlo Kleber
- 2007: (Brazil) Luis Alberto
- 2007–2008: (Vietnam) Vương Tiến Dũng
- 2008–2009: (Austria) Alfred Riedl
- 2009: (Vietnam) Đinh Thế Nam
- 2009–2011: (Vietnam) Vương Tiến Dũng
- 2011–2012: (Vietnam) Nguyễn Đình Hưng
- 2012: (Vietnam) Lê Thụy Hải
- 2013–2014: (Vietnam) Hoàng Anh Tuấn
- 2014: (Malta) Dylan Kerr
- 2014–2019: (Vietnam) Trương Việt Hoàng
- 2019–2022: (Vietnam) Phạm Anh Tuấn
- 2022–2026: (Vietnam) Chu Đình Nghiêm
- 2026–present: (Vietnam) Đặng Văn Thành

== Honours ==
=== National competitions ===
League

- V.League 1/A1 National League
  - Runners-up: 1992, 2010, 2016, 2022
- V.League 2
  - Winners (2): 1995, 2003
  - Runners-up: 2007

Cup

- Vietnamese National Cup
  - Winners (2): 1995, 2014
  - Runners-up: 2005
- Vietnamese Super Cup
  - Winners (1): 2005
  - Runners-up: 2014, 2022

=== Other competitions ===
- North Vietnam A1 League
  - Winners (3): 1961, 1963, 1968
  - Runners-up: 1955, 1967, 1974
- Festival Sport Vietnam
  - Winners (3): 1985, 1990, 1995
- Hoa Lư Cup
  - Winners: 2022
