= Cong An Ho Chi Minh City FC =

Vietnamese association football club

Công An Hồ Chí Minh City Công an Thành phố Hồ Chí Minh
- Full name: Công An Hồ Chí Minh City Football Club; Câu lạc bộ bóng đá Công an Thành phố Hồ Chí Minh
- Nickname: Chiến hạm đỏ (The Red Battleship)
- Short name: CAHCM; CAHCMC; CATPHCM
- Founded: 1958; 68 years ago, as Saigon Harbour; 11 January 1975; 51 years ago, as Saigon Port; 22 January 2009; 17 years ago, as Hồ Chí Minh City
- Ground: Thống Nhất Stadium
- Capacity: 14,400
- Owner: Ho Chi Minh City Public Security Departement
- Chairman: Lương Đức Minh
- Head coach: Arthur Diles
- League: V.League 1
- 2025–26: V.League 1, 5th of 14
- Website: www.cahcmfc.vn
Home colours	Away colours	Third colours

Cong An Ho Chi Minh City Football Club (Vietnamese: Câu lạc bộ bóng đá Công an Thành phố Hồ Chí Minh), also known as Ho Chi Minh City Police, is a professional football club based in Ho Chi Minh City, Vietnam. The club is currently competing in the V.League 1, the highest level of Vietnamese football, since the 2017 season.

The club was known as Thương Cảng Sài Gòn (Saigon Harbour) before 1975, then Cảng Sài Gòn (Saigon Port) between 1975 and 2009, and Hồ Chí Minh City between 2009 and 2025. The club's home ground is the Thống Nhất Stadium.

The club also has won 4 V.League 1 titles, 2 V.League 2 titles, 3 Vietnamese Cup and 3 Vietnamese Super Cup in their history.

== History ==
=== As Saigon Port (1958–2008) ===
On 1 November 1975, the Saigon Port Workers Football Club was officially established, inherited many players and staffs from the previous Saigon Harbour Football Club that competed in the South Vietnam Football Championship. The team quickly became well known in Southern Vietnam, together with Hải Quan - their local rivals.

In 1980, Saigon Port was one of 10 clubs based in Southern Vietnam to participate in the 1980 Vietnamese National A1 League - the first football championship in Vietnam. In 1983, former defender Phạm Huỳnh Tam Lang returned from Germany and was appointed as a head coach for the club. In 1984, CSG began to focus on recruiting young players from their youth academy, including Đặng Trần Chỉnh, Hà Vương Ngầu Nại, Nguyễn Hoàng Châu, Phạm Văn Tám, this squad was later regarded as the club's "Golden Generation". Among them, midfielder Hà Vương Ngầu Nại received recognition by becoming the top scorer of the 1989 V-League, scoring a total of 10 goals. However, until the end of 1990, the team had not won any more titles besides the 1986 V-League.

From 1990 to 2001, many players of the team were called up to the Vietnam national team, including Nguyễn Hồng Phẩm, Hà Vương Ngầu Nại, Lư Đình Tuấn, Hồ Văn Lợi, Huỳnh Hồng Sơn. In 2001, under the new name Saigon Port Football Club, they won another league title in the 2001–02 season. However, they were relegated to the First Division the following season, returning to the V-League again in 2005.

=== As Hồ Chí Minh City (2009–2025) ===
The Saigon Port Corporation's officials claimed at the end of 2008 that they no longer had money to support the club. At that time, they only had one primary sponsor, the Vietnam Steel Company. The club's leadership decided to alter the name in order to operate on a professional model. Hồ Chí Minh City Football Club was adopted with the permission of the club's management unit, the Hồ Chí Minh City Football Company Ltd, and the Hồ Chí Minh City Football Federation, with a 15 billion Vietnam Dong investment.

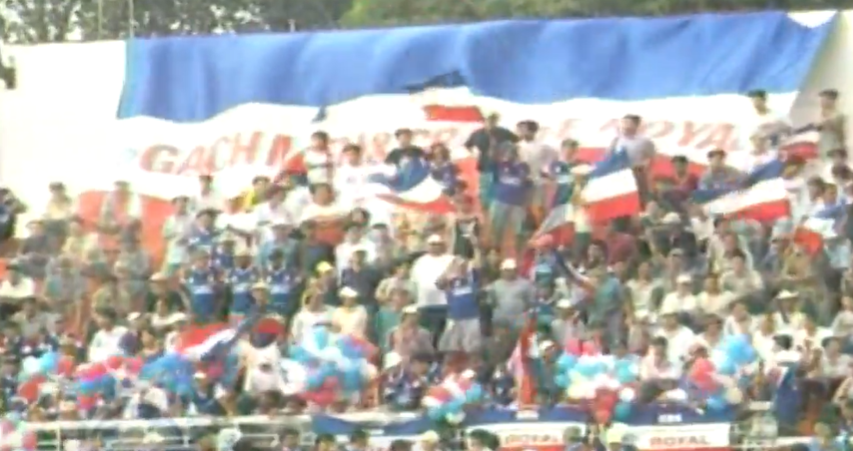
Saigon Port fans on Thống Nhất Stadium

Because of their devotion to the heritage connected with the name Saigon Port, the club's supporters have expressed disappointment and resistance. The club officially changed its name to Hồ Chí Minh City Football Club on 22 January 2009, with the Vietnam Steel Corporation serving as the primary sponsor.

The whole fans association executive committee resigned, and the Saigon Port Football Supporters Association dissolved. They were relegated to the Vietnamese Football League Second Division after finishing 13th place in the 2009 season. In 2012, the club finished last in the Vietnamese First League. After only one season at the second league, Ho Chi Minh returned to the V.League 2 in 2015. With the ambition to return to top fight, Ho Chi Minh City received big investments and successfully gained a promotion to the V.League 1 after winning the 2016 V.League 2.

The club's reputation among supporters progressively improved, Ho Chi Minh City Football Club Fans Association was formed. The squad finished 12th in the league standings in 2017. In the 2019 season, Jung Hae-seong was named as Hồ Chí Minh City's new coach. He was the VIetnam national team's assistant coach. Under his management, Hồ Chí Minh City was in the title race, being the league's top 2 throughout the season. The club finished first after the first part of the season, but Hà Nội won the title. The team also qualified to the 2020 AFC Champions League preliminary round.

In the following season, Hồ Chí Minh City had spent 20 billion ₫ on the transfer market, signing several reputated players, such as Nguyễn Công Phượng and Võ Huy Toàn, as well as Costa Rican forwards Ariel Rodríguez and José Guillermo Ortiz. The club began the season with a defeat against Hà Nội in the Vietnamese Super Cup, followed by the defeat in the AFC Champions League preliminary round which resulted in their entry to the 2020 AFC Cup group stage. There, the team topped their group with two wins and one defeat, before the competition was cancelled due to the COVID-19 pandemic. in the 2020 V.League 1, the club's form was inconsistent and the foreign players performed poorly. The club finished 5th in the league.

Before the start of the 2021 season, the club's management made several changes to the personnel. Alexandré Pölking, the former coach of Bangkok United, was appointed as the new coach with a 1-year contract. In December 2020, Ho Chi Minh City announced the signing of Vietnamese-American midfielder Lee Nguyen, who played for USA national team. However, the team performed poorly due to players' difficulties to adapt to the coach's tactics. They eventually finished at 11th place when the season was cancelled after the 14th matchday, due to the impact of pandemic in Vietnam.

=== As Công An Hồ Chí Minh City (2025–present) ===
On 14 July 2025, the club was officially changed their name to Công An Hồ Chí Minh City, following the ownership transfer to the Công An Hồ Chí Minh City Public Security Department. This marked the return of the name Công An Hồ Chí Minh City in Vietnamese football since 2002, when the 1979 established team had dissolved. In the first season after the name change, they finished sixth in the V.League 1, and won the 2025–26 Vietnamese Cup after a 2–1 win over Ninh Bình in the cup final. This was their first national cup title in 26 years.

== Team image ==
=== Name history ===
Saigon Harbour (1958–1975)
Saigon Port (1975–2009)	Cong An Ho Chi Minh City (1979–2002)
Hồ Chí Minh City (2009–2025)
Công An Hồ Chí Minh City (2025–present)

== Kit manufacturers and shirt sponsors ==
Period	Kit manufacturer	Shirt sponsor
2017–2018	(Japan) Mizuno	Cityland
2019	(South Korea) Zaicro	Cityland
2020	(Italy) Kappa	Cityland
2021–2023	(Spain) Kelme	Cityland; Bamboo Airways Viva Land; SCB; Phú Mỹ Hưng; Murata
2023–present	(Japan) Jogarbola	Mansion Sports; Phu Hung Life Insurance; Phu Hung Securities; Công An TP. Hồ Chí Minh; Sacombank

== Affiliated clubs ==
- (Singapore) Geylang International (2019–present)
- (Brazil) Grêmio (2025–present)

== Players ==
As of 11 September 2026

Note: Flags indicate national team as defined under FIFA eligibility rules; some limited exceptions apply. Players may hold more than one non-FIFA nationality.

No.	Pos.	Nation	Player
2	DF	BEL	Lenn-Minh Tran
3	DF	VIE	Lê Khả Đức
4	DF	NED	Dirk Abels
5	DF	VIE	Đinh Quang Kiệt
6	MF	VIE	Đặng Văn Trâm
7	FW	VIE	Olaha Mạnh Đức
8	MF	COL	Juanjo Narváez
9	FW	AUS	Jason Cummings
10	MF	ANG	Aldaír Ferreira
11	MF	VIE	Nguyễn Phi Hoàng
12	MF	BRA	Léo Gomes
13	DF	VIE	Khổng Minh Gia Bảo
16	DF	VIE	Nguyễn Hoàng Minh Nhật
17	DF	VIE	Võ Minh Trọng

No.	Pos.	Nation	Player
19	MF	VIE	Nguyễn Thái Quốc Cường
20	FW	VIE	Phan Văn Đức
21	MF	VIE	Đào Quốc Gia
22	FW	VIE	Nguyễn Tiến Linh (captain)
26	MF	VIE	Ngô Đăng Khoa
27	DF	VIE	Nguyễn Nhật Minh
28	DF	VIE	Trần Hoàng Phúc
32	GK	VIE	Phan Văn Biểu
33	FW	VIE	Williams Minh Hoàng
34	DF	VIE	Lê Quang Hùng
39	MF	VIE	Nguyễn Đức Phú
56	GK	VIE	Hoa Xuân Tín
58	MF	FRA	Arthur Yamga
89	GK	VIE	Lê Giang Patrik

=== Out on loan ===
Note: Flags indicate national team as defined under FIFA eligibility rules; some limited exceptions apply. Players may hold more than one non-FIFA nationality.

No.	Pos.	Nation	Player
2	DF	VIE	Adriano Schmidt (on loan to Becamex HCMC until 1 July 2027)
77	MF	VIE	Phan Nhật Thanh Long (on loan to Hoàng Anh Gia Lai until 1 July 2027)

== Management and staff ==
As of 26 September 2026

Position	Name
Head coach	(Australia) Arthur Diles
Assistant coach	(Australia) Peter Kofinas (Vietnam) Hoàng Hùng (Vietnam) Phùng Thanh Phương
Goalkeeper coach	(Vietnam) Châu Trí Cường
Fitness coach	(Australia) Dean Filopoulos
Technical analyst	(Vietnam) Doãn Nhật Tiến (Vietnam) Ngô Xuân Nghĩa
Doctor	(Vietnam) An Văn Pháp (Vietnam) Đặng Hiếu Hảo
Physiotherapist	(Brazil) Luiz Felipe Santos
Interpreter	(Vietnam) Nguyễn Hưng Phát
Kit manager	(Vietnam) Huỳnh Tấn Trí Thông

== Managerial history ==
As of 1 September 2026

Name	Period	Achivements
(Vietnam) Nguyễn Thành Sự	1975−1983	1977 Cửu Long League; 1978 Cửu Long League; 1979 Cửu Long League
(Vietnam) Phạm Huỳnh Tam Lang	1983−2003	1986 V-League; 1992 Vietnamese Cup; 1993–94 V-League; 1997 V-League; 1999–2000 Vietnamese Cup; 2001–02 V-League
(Vietnam) Đặng Trần Chỉnh	2003−2007	2004 Vietnamese First Division
(Vietnam) Võ Hoàng Bửu	2007	
(Vietnam) Lư Đình Tuấn	2007−2009	
(Vietnam) Đặng Trần Chỉnh	2009	
(Vietnam) Võ Hoàng Bửu	2009−2010	
(Vietnam) Nguyễn Phúc Nguyên Chương	2010	
(Vietnam) Lư Đình Tuấn	2010	
(Croatia) Vjeran Simunić	2010−2011	
(Vietnam) Huỳnh Hồng Sơn	2011	
(Serbia) Srdjan Zivojnov	2011−2012	
(Vietnam) Đoàn Minh Xương	2013	
(South Africa) Sudesh Singh	2013−2014	
(Vietnam) Phùng Thanh Phương	2014−2015	
(Vietnam) Lư Đình Tuấn	2015−2017	2016 V.League 2
(France) Alain Fiard	2017	
(Vietnam) Lư Đình Tuấn (caretaker)	2017−2018	
(Japan) Toshiya Miura	2018	
(South Korea) Jung Hae-seong	2018−2020	
(Vietnam) Nguyễn Hữu Thắng (caretaker)	2020	
(South Korea) Jung Hae-seong	2020	
(Brazil) Alexandré Pölking	2020−2021	
(Vietnam) Trần Minh Chiến	2021−2022	
(Vietnam) Nguyễn Hữu Thắng (caretaker)	2022	
(Vietnam) Vũ Tiến Thành	2022−2023	
(Vietnam) Phùng Thanh Phương	2023−2025	
(Vietnam) Lê Huỳnh Đức	2025−2026	
(Vietnam) Phùng Thanh Phương	2026	2025–26 Vietnamese Cup
(Australia) Arthur Diles	2026−present	

== Honours ==
=== National competitions ===
League

- V.League 1:
  - Champions (4): 1986, 1993–94, 1997, 2001–02
  - Runners-up (1): 2019
- V.League 2:
  - Champions (2): 2004, 2016
- South Vietnam Football Championship:
  - Champions (3): 1977, 1978, 1979

Cup

- Vietnamese Cup:
  - Champions (3): 1992, 1999–2000, 2025–26
  - Runners-up (4): 1994, 1996, 1997
- Vietnamese Super Cup:
  - Runners-up (4): 2000, 2002, 2019, 2026

=== Other competitions ===
- BTV Cup:
  - Champions (1): 2000
  - Runners-up (1): 2001

== Award winners ==
=== Domestic ===
- Player of the Season
  - (Brazil) Elenildo de Jesus (2006)
- League Golden Boot
  - (Vietnam) Hà Vương Ngầu Nại (1989, 1991) (V.League 1)
  - (Vietnam) Hồ Văn Lợi (2001–02) (V.League 1)
  - (Brazil) Elenildo de Jesus (2006) (V.League 1)
  - (Vietnam) Nguyễn Tuấn Anh (2016) (V.League 2)
- Manager of the Season
  - (South Korea) Jung Hae-seong (2019)

== Season by season record ==
Season	Pld	Won	Draw	Lost	GF	GA	GD	PTS	Final position	Notes
2000–01 V-League	18	7	6	5	29	21	+8	27	4th	
2001–02 V-League	18	9	5	4	20	16	+4	32	Champions	Qualified for the 2002–03 AFC Champions League qualification Round 3
2003 V-League	22	4	7	11	26	41	−15	19	11th	Relegated to Vietnamese First League
2004 Vietnamese First League	22	15	5	2	51	18	+33	50	Champions	Promoted to V-League
2005 V-League	22	6	9	7	25	29	−4	27	8th	
2006 V-League	24	7	8	9	35	38	−3	29	10th	
2007 V-League	26	8	10	8	41	40	+1	34	8th	
2008 V-League	26	11	6	9	34	34	0	39	5th	
2009 V-League	26	8	5	13	34	44	−10	29	13th	Relegated to Vietnamese First League
2010 Vietnamese First League	24	7	6	11	28	42	−14	27	10th	
2011 Vietnamese First League	26	6	10	10	29	36	−7	28	11th	
2012 Vietnamese First League	26	5	8	13	36	54	−18	23	14th	Relegated to Vietnamese Second League
2013 Vietnamese Second League	10	5	1	4	13	10	+3	16	2nd (Group C)	Promoted through play-offs
2014 V.League 2	14	3	4	7	11	19	−8	13	7th	
2015 V.League 2	14	7	3	4	19	13	+6	24	3rd	
2016 V.League 2	18	12	3	3	38	15	+23	39	Champions	Promoted to V.League 1
2017 V.League 1	26	6	7	13	29	46	−17	25	12th	
2018 V.League 1	26	7	6	13	36	44	−8	27	12th	
2019 V.League 1	26	14	6	6	41	29	+12	48	2nd	Qualified for the 2020 AFC Champions League qualifying play-offs (Note: As Hanoi FC failed to obtain an AFC license, Ho Chi Minh City FC qualified for the 2020 AFC Champions League qualifying play-offs.)
2020 V.League 1	20	8	4	8	29	25	+4	28	5th	
2021 V.League 1	12	4	2	6	14	17	–3	14	11th	League was cancelled due to COVID-19
2022 V.League 1	24	6	7	11	23	34	-11	25	9th	
2023 V.League 1	18	4	3	11	21	32	-8	15	13th	
2023–24 V.League 1	26	11	7	8	30	26	+4	40	4th	
2024–25 V.League 1	26	6	10	10	19	36	−17	28	10th	

== Performance in AFC competition ==
All results list Ho Chi Minh City's goal tally first.

=== Continental ===
Season	Competition	Round	Club	Home	Away	Aggregate
1993–94	Asian Cup Winner' Cup	First round	(Malaysia) Sarawak FA	w/o (Note: Sarawak FA withdrew.)		
1993–94	Asian Cup Winner' Cup	Second round	(Indonesia) Semen Padang	0–1	1–1	1–2
1995–96	Asian Club Championship	First round	(Malaysia) Pahang FA	w/o (Note: Cảng Sài Gòn withdrew.)		
1998–99	Asian Club Championship	First round	(South Korea) Pohang Steelers	0–2	0–4	0–6
2000–01	Asian Cup Winners' Cup	First round	Singapore Armed Forces	0–0	2–0	2–0
2000–01	Asian Cup Winners' Cup	Second round	(Japan) Shimizu S-Pulse	0–2	0–4	0–6
2002–03	AFC Champions League	Qualification	(India) Churchill Brothers	0–2	1–0	1–2
2020	AFC Champions League	Preliminary round 2	(Thailand) Buriram United	1–2		
2020	AFC Cup	Group F	(Myanmar) Yangon United	Cancelled	2–2	
2020	AFC Cup	Group F	(Singapore) Hougang United	Cancelled	3–2	
2020	AFC Cup	Group F	(Laos) Lao Toyota	Cancelled	2–0	

=== Regional ===
Season	Competition	Round	Club	Home	Away	Aggregate
2026–27	ASEAN Club Championship	Group A	(Thailand) Ratchaburi	—N/a	1–1	
2026–27	ASEAN Club Championship	Group A	(Thailand) Buriram United	1–0	—N/a	
2026–27	ASEAN Club Championship	Group A	(Singapore) BG Tampines Rovers	—N/a		
2026–27	ASEAN Club Championship	Group A	(Malaysia) Kuching City		—N/a	
2026–27	ASEAN Club Championship	Group A	(Indonesia) Borneo		—N/a	
2026–27	ASEAN Club Championship	Group A	(Philippines) Manila Digger	—N/a		

== Performance in AFC competitions ==
- AFC Champions League: 2 appearances
  2002–03: Qualification round 3
  2020: Preliminary round 2
- AFC Cup: 1 appearance
  2020: Group stage
