= Thanh Hóa FC (1962) =

- Full name: Thanh Hóa Football Club
- Nickname: Thanh
- Founded: 1962
- Dissolved: 2010
- Ground: Thanh Hóa Stadium
- Capacity: 14.100
- Chairman: Phạm Văn Khánh
- Manager: Đàm Hải
- League: V-League
- 2009: 14th
Home colours	Away colours

Thanh Hóa Football Club (Thanh Hóa FC) was a Vietnamese football/soccer team based in the province of Thanh Hóa, Vietnam.

== History ==
The club was established in 1962 as "Thanh Hóa Mechanical Club". In 1965, it merged with Thanh Hóa Police Football Club to form Thanh Hóa Football Club. Thanh Hóa FC developed players and competed against elite police teams from the Socialist Bloc.

In 2000 the team was relegated to the lowest tier of the Vietnamese football league system. The People's Committee of Thanh Hóa Province subsequently re-established the team as the Thanh Hóa football team. After May 2005, it was renamed Halida Thanh Hóa. For the second phase of the 2008 V-League season, the team was transferred to a corporation and renamed.

The team dissolved in 2010 and merged into Lam Sơn Thanh Hóa F.C., which continued to compete in the V-League.

== League history ==
- From 1962 to 1980: The team usually played in the resolution, explaining the movement of Ministry of Public Security of Vietnam.
- From 1980 to 1985: The club played in the A2 Championshipat in Vietnam. The A2 Grade Championship in 1985 promoted the team to the A1 level.
- In 1986: The team played in the A1 championship in Vietnam. In step 1, the team was competitive in table A. 2 games were won, 7 lost, and 3 drawn. The effect-goal defeat was 8–18, gaining seven points, and ranking 7/7 on Table A.
- In 1987: The club continued to play at the A1 level. Period 1, competition on table B. The club won 4 games, lost 7, and 5 were drawn. The effect-goal defeats were 19–25, reaching 12 points. Ranked No. 6/9 Table B.
- In 1988: No tournaments were organized for this season.
- In 1989: A period of play in table C. The club won 4 games, lost 4, and 4 were drawn. The signal-loss goal is 12–13, ranked 7 / 11, reached the second stage competition. Phase 2 in Group 1 competition. Results: in March, losing 3 and rank 3 / 7.
- In 1990: rated 5 / 6 Group A, not a series of stages through
- In 1991: competed in Group C Stage 1, achievement: won 1, drawn 2, lost 7, effect-goal defeat was 5–14, rated 6 / 6.
- 1992: A1 relegation.
- From 1993 to 1994 season, reached a point all season. A2 relegation.
- From 1995 to 2000, competed in the A2. U19 championship in 1997 Vietnam.
- Class of 2000 by the Vietnam Football Federation, the Thanh Hóa Youth Championship tournament in 3 (the lowest system rating is four). In 2000, Thanh Hóa Youth Group A and took most rank 2.
- In 2001, champion 2 and gained a promotion.
- In 2002, ranked 5/12 in the division in Vietnam.
- In 2003, ranked 3/12 first-class championship in Vietnam.
- In 2004, competed in Vietnam with a first-class achievement: won 6, drawn 8, lost 8, at 26 points, ranking 6 / 12.

Lost 9, effect-goal defeat was 19–18, reaching 21 points, ranking 7/12.

- In 2005, the club competed in the Championship tournament in Vietnam, winning 7 games, losing 9, drawn 6, at 21 points, ranking 7/12.
- In 2006, the club played in the Championship class in Vietnam. Result: won 12, drawn 12, lost 2, signal-loss goal is 43–19, ranked 2/14. Professional gain promotion.
- In 2007, the club competed in the national championship V-League. Results: Phase 1 formula ranked No. 2. Full finished the season ranked 9/14, won 8 games, drawn 10 matches, losing eight games. Scored 34 points to reach 27 goals, conceding 30 goals (including three goals by the organizers were lost in treatment for 6), fined 46 yellow cards, two red cards.
- In 2008, the club competed in V-League 2008. Out of 26 games, they won 8 games, lost 9 games, and tied 9 matches. A total of 25 goals were scored, conceding 32 goals. A total of 32 points yielded a final ranking of 10/14.
- In 2009, the club competed in V-League 2009. Their final ranking was 14/14, setting them to play in the V-League 2 the following year.

== Crest ==
Old club crest

== Coaches ==
Coaches	Nationality	Calendar year
Lê Thụy Hải	Vietnam	2001–2003
Vương Tiến Dũng	Vietnam	2003–2004
Trần Văn Phúc	Vietnam	2005–2008
Nguyễn Văn Tiến	Vietnam	2009–31 May 2009
Triệu Quang Hà	Vietnam	31 May 2009–June 2009
Nguyễn Văn Tiến	Vietnam	June 2009–2010
Đàm Hải	Vietnam	2009–January 2010
