= Thailand national football team results (2000–2009) =

This article lists the results for the Thailand national football team between 2000 and 2009.

- Only record the results that affect the FIFA/Coca-Cola World Ranking. See FIFA 'A' matches criteria.

Win Draw Loss

== 2000 ==
20 Feb 2000 King's Cup 2000	Thailand	0–0	Finland	Bangkok, Thailand
17:00 UTC+7				Stadium: Rajamangala Stadium

23 Feb 2000 King's Cup 2000	Thailand	0–7	Brazil	Bangkok, Thailand
17:00 UTC+7		Report	Rivaldo 25', 40'; Ronaldinho 44'; Émerson 49', 85'; Roque Júnior 73'; Jardel 80'	Stadium: Rajamangala Stadium; Attendance: 50,000

25 Feb 2000 King's Cup 2000	Thailand	2–1	Estonia	Bangkok, Thailand
17:00 UTC+7	Pipat 22', 34'		Reim 65' (pen.)	Stadium: Rajamangala Stadium

27 Feb 2000 King's Cup 2000	Thailand	5–1	Finland	Bangkok, Thailand
17:00 UTC+7	Anurak 22', 44', 81'; Pipat 25'; Thanunchai 56'		Kallio 73'	Stadium: Rajamangala Stadium; Attendance: 15,000

25 Mar 2000 Asian Cup 2000 Q	North Korea	0–0	Thailand	Kuala Lumpur, Malaysia
18:45 UTC+8				Stadium: Shah Alam Stadium; Attendance: 15,150; Referee: Yam-Ming Chan (Hong Kong)

27 Mar 2000 Asian Cup 2000 Q	Chinese Taipei	0–2	Thailand	Kuala Lumpur, Malaysia
18:45 UTC+8			Piturat 74'; Cheng Yung-Jen 81' (o.g.)	Stadium: Shah Alam Stadium

29 Mar 2000 Asian Cup 2000 Q	Malaysia	3–2	Thailand	Kuala Lumpur, Malaysia
20:45 UTC+8	Suparman 14'; Derus 21' (pen.); Jusoh 48'		Fuangprakob 55'; Surasiang 90'	Stadium: Shah Alam Stadium

4 Apr 2000 Asian Cup 2000 Q	Thailand	5–3	North Korea	Bangkok, Thailand
18:30 UTC+7	Damrong-Ontrakul 34'; Surasiang 35'; Piturat 73'; Noosarung 86'; Thonkanya 88'		Ju Song-Il 28'; Kim Ho-Gun 53'; Ko Jong-Nam 60'; Ri Man-Chol	Stadium: Suphachalasai Stadium

6 Apr 2000 Asian Cup 2000 Q	Thailand	1–0	Chinese Taipei	Bangkok, Thailand
18:30 UTC+7	Damrong-Ontrakul 43'			Stadium: Suphachalasai Stadium

8 Apr 2000 Asian Cup 2000 Q	Thailand	3–2	Malaysia	Bangkok, Thailand
18:30 UTC+7	Noosarung 14'; Baribarn 24' (pen.), 67'		Suparman 35'; Yusoff 60'	Stadium: Suphachalasai Stadium

18 May 2000 Friendly	Thailand	2–0	Uzbekistan	Bangkok, Thailand
	Therdsak Chaiman 28', 74'	Report		Stadium: Thephasadin Stadium

10 Jun 2000 Friendly	Thailand	2–3	Qatar	Bangkok, Thailand
	Sutee Suksomkit 52'; Worrawoot Srimaka 90'		Ahmed Khalid Salih 5'; Ali Adel Jadoua 25'; Aziz Hassan Bujaloof 58'	Stadium: Suphachalasai Stadium; Attendance: 9,000

1 Sep 2000 Four Nations Cup	China	3–1	Thailand	Shanghai, China
	Su Maozhen 10'; Qi Hong 35'; Lihui Song 87'		Therdsak Chaiman 90'	Stadium: Shanghai Stadium; Attendance: 36,257

3 Sep 2000 Four Nations Cup	Thailand	4–2	Uzbekistan	Shanghai, China
	Dusit Chalemsan 9'; Sutee Suksomkit 18'; Sakesan Pituratana 25'; Therdsak Chaiman 30'	Report	Jafar Irismetov 40'; Umid Isoqov 45'	Stadium: Shanghai Stadium; Attendance: 40,000

30 Sep 2000 Friendly	Kuwait	3–2	Thailand	Kuwait City, Kuwait
	Bashar Abdullah 51'; Jasem Al-Huwaidi 57', 90+1'		Sutee Suksomkit 55'; Niweat Siriwong 88'

6 Oct 2000 Friendly	Qatar	1–1	Thailand	Doha, Qatar
	Dahi Al Naemi		Therdsak Chaiman

12 Oct 2000 Asian Cup 2000	Thailand	0–2	Iraq	Sidon, Lebanon
15:00 UTC+2		Report	Chathir 27'; Mahmoud 60'	Stadium: Saida Municipal Stadium; Attendance: 2,500; Referee: Toru Kamikawa (Japan)

15 Oct 2000 Asian Cup 2000	Thailand	1–1	Iran	Beirut, Lebanon
17:00 UTC+2	Pituratana 12'	Report	Daei 73'	Stadium: Sports City Stadium; Attendance: 10,000; Referee: Saad Kamil Al-Fadhli (Kuwait)

19 Oct 2000 Asian Cup 2000	Lebanon	1–1	Thailand	Sidon, Lebanon
19:00 UTC+2	Fernandes 83'	Report	Pituratana 58'	Stadium: Saida Municipal Stadium; Attendance: 8,582; Referee: Lu Jun (China)

6 Nov 2000 Tiger Cup 2000	Thailand	3–1	Myanmar	Chiang Mai, Thailand
19:00 UTC+7	Kiatisuk Senamuang 4'; Sakesan Pituratana 47'; Surachai Jaturapattarapong 74'	Report	Aung Kyaw Tun 62'	Stadium: 700th Anniversary Stadium; Referee: S. Kumbalingam Kennedy (Singapore)

10 Nov 2000 Tiger Cup 2000	Thailand	4–1	Indonesia	Chiang Mai, Thailand
19:00 UTC+7	Worrawoot Srimaka 25', 49'; Kiatisuk Senamuang 52'; Dusit Chalermsan 79'	Report	Gendut Doni Christiawan 57'	Stadium: 700th Anniversary Stadium; Referee: Mohd Nazri Abdullah (Malaysia)

12 Nov 2000 Tiger Cup 2000	Thailand	2–0	Philippines	Chiang Mai, Thailand
19:00 UTC+7	Kiatisuk Senamuang 4'; Anurak Srikerd 14'	Report		Stadium: 700th Anniversary Stadium; Referee: Nguyen Van Mui (Vietnam)

16 Nov 2000 Tiger Cup 2000	Thailand	2–0	Malaysia	Bangkok, Thailand
19:00 UTC+7	Kiatisuk Senamuang 30'; Tawan Sripan 35'	Report		Stadium: Rajamangala Stadium; Referee: U Tun Hla Aung (Myanmar)

18 Nov 2000 Tiger Cup 2000	Thailand	4–1	Indonesia	Bangkok, Thailand
19:00 UTC+7	Worrawoot Srimaka 14', 18', 32'; Tanongsak Prajakkata 65'	Report	Uston Nawawi 20'	Stadium: Rajamangala Stadium; Attendance: 30,000; Referee: Mohd Nazri Abdullah (Malaysia)

== 2001 ==
23 Jan 2001 Friendly	Thailand	5–4	Kuwait	Bangkok, Thailand
19:00 UTC+7	Kiatisuk Senamuang 55', 70', 83' (pen.); Worrawoot Srimaka 65'; Thanunchai Baribarn 75'	Report	Meshari Ben Hajee 44'; Jamal Abdulrahman 54'; Jasem Al-Huwaidi 59'; Bashar Abdullah 61'	Stadium: Supachalasai Stadium; Attendance: 2,000; Referee: Panya Hanlumyuang (Thailand)

27 Jan 2001 Mikasa Challenge 2001	Singapore	1–1 (5–3 p)	Thailand	Kallang, Singapore
20:30 UTC+8	Zulkarnaen Zainal 90' (pen.)	Report	Sutee Suksomkit 71'	Stadium: National Stadium; Attendance: 35,000; Referee: Halim Abdul Hamid (Malaysia)
	Penalties
	Hafizat Jauharmi (penalty scored); Zulkarnaen Zainal (penalty scored); Hasrin Jailani (penalty scored); Fadzuhasny Juraimi (penalty scored); Rafi Ali (penalty scored)		(penalty scored) Choketawee Promrut; (penalty scored) Surachai Jaturapattarapong; (penalty missed) Thanunchai Baribarn; (penalty scored) Pipat Thonkanya

30 Jan 2001 Friendly	Thailand	3–1	Kyrgyzstan	Bangkok, Thailand
19:00 UTC+7	Seksan Piturat 47'; Thanunchai Baribarn 58'; Therdsak Chaiman 62' (pen.)	Report	Igor Kudrenko 80'	Stadium: Supachalasai Stadium; Attendance: 2,000; Referee: Somsak Semsayan (Thailand)

10 Feb 2001 King's Cup 2001	Thailand	1–4	Sweden	Bangkok, Thailand
19:00 UTC+7	Tawan Sripan 50'	Report	Stefan Selaković 25'; Anders Svensson 39'; Fredrik Berglund 72'; Martin Åslund 90'	Stadium: Supachalasai Stadium; Attendance: 20,000

12 Feb 2001 King's Cup 2001	Thailand	1–3	Qatar	Bangkok, Thailand
16:00 UTC+7	Tawan Sripan 84'	Report	Mubarak Mustafa 54'; Waleed Hamzah 66', 73'	Stadium: Supachalasai Stadium; Attendance: 15,000

14 Feb 2001 King's Cup 2001	Thailand	1–5	China	Bangkok, Thailand
16:00 UTC+7	Tawan Sripan 68'	Report	Zhang Yuning 15', 23', 60'; Su Maozhen 31'; Li Tie 90'	Stadium: Supachalasai Stadium; Attendance: 15,000

17 Feb 2001 King's Cup 2001	Thailand	2–0	Qatar	Bangkok, Thailand
16:00 UTC+7	Kiatisuk Senamuang 17', 55'	Report		Stadium: Supachalasai Stadium; Attendance: 20,000; Referee: Ahmad Kalidy Binsupan (Malaysia)

13 May 2001 World Cup 2002 Q	Sri Lanka	2–4	Thailand	Beirut, Lebanon
15:30 UTC+03	Raheem 20', 50'	Report	Senamuang 46', 51'; Chaiman 53'; Damrong-Ongtrakul 84'	Stadium: Beirut Municipal Stadium; Attendance: 1,000; Referee: Gong Jianping (CHN)

15 May 2001 World Cup 2002 Q	Pakistan	0–3	Thailand	Beirut, Lebanon
18:00 UTC+03		Report	Piturat 35', 52'; Chaiman 86'	Stadium: Beirut Municipal Stadium; Attendance: 1,000; Referee: Sabah Kasim (IRQ)

18 May 2001 World Cup 2002 Q	Lebanon	1–2	Thailand	Beirut, Lebanon
18:00 UTC+03	Roda Antar 9'	Report	Piturat 15'; Senamuang 27'	Stadium: Beirut Municipal Stadium; Attendance: 15,000; Referee: Kim Young-Joo (KOR)

26 May 2001 World Cup 2002 Q	Thailand	3–0	Sri Lanka	Bangkok, Thailand
18:30 UTC+07	Pituratana 37'; Senamuang 50', 60'	Report		Stadium: Supachalasai Stadium; Attendance: 10,000; Referee: Zhang Jianjun (CHN)

28 May 2001 World Cup 2002 Q	Thailand	6–0	Pakistan	Bangkok, Thailand
18:30 UTC+07	Senamuang 10', 51', 55', 74'; Siriwong 78'; Jirasirichote 83'	Report		Stadium: Supachalasai Stadium; Attendance: 10,000; Referee: Fareed Al-Marzouqi (UAE)

30 May 2001 World Cup 2002 Q	Thailand	2–2	Lebanon	Bangkok, Thailand
18:30 UTC+07	Pituratana 73'; Sripan 77'	Report	Ghazarian 35'; Hojeij 87'	Stadium: Supachalasai Stadium; Attendance: 30,000; Referee: Toru Kamikawa (JPN)

13 Aug 2001 Friendly	Singapore	0–5	Thailand	Kallang, Singapore
18:00 UTC+08		Report	Kiatisuk Senamuang 25', 70'; Seksan Piturat 43', 75'; Sutee Suksomkit 90'	Stadium: National Stadium; Attendance: 7,500; Referee: Kennedy Kumbalingham (Singapore)

17 Aug 2001 World Cup 2002 Q	Iraq	4–0	Thailand	Baghdad, Iraq
20:00 UTC+04	Mohammed 23', 76'; Emad Mohammed 70'; Hussein 86'	Report		Stadium: Al-Shaab Stadium; Attendance: 20,000; Referee: Masayoshi Okada (JPN)

1 Sep 2001 World Cup 2002 Q	Thailand	0–0	Iran	Bangkok, Thailand
18:30 UTC+07		Report		Stadium: Rajamangala Stadium; Attendance: 30,000; Referee: Ali Bujsaim (UAE)

6 Sep 2001 World Cup 2002 Q	Bahrain	1–1	Thailand	Manama, Bahrain
18:30 UTC+03	Al-Dossari 16'	Report	Senamuang 64'	Stadium: Bahrain National Stadium; Attendance: 35,000; Referee: Kim Tae-Young (KOR)

15 Sep 2001 World Cup 2002 Q	Thailand	1–3	Saudi Arabia	Bangkok, Thailand
18:30 UTC+07	Pituratana 28'	Report	Al-Jaber 47'; Bin Shehan 63'; Al-Dosari 70'	Stadium: Rajamangala Stadium; Attendance: 18,000; Referee: Naotsugu Fuse (JPN)

22 Sep 2001 World Cup 2002 Q	Thailand	1–1	Iraq	Bangkok, Thailand
18:30 UTC+07	Suksomkit 38'	Report	Emad Mohammed 63'	Stadium: Rajamangala Stadium; Attendance: 17,000; Referee: Sun Baojie (China)

29 Sep 2001 Friendly	Thailand	2–0	Oman	Bangkok, Thailand
	Worrawoot Srimaka 28', 46'	Report		Stadium: Thai Army Sports Stadium

5 Oct 2001 World Cup 2002 Q	Iran	1–0	Thailand	Tehran, Iran
16:00 UTC+04:30	Nikbakht 32'	Report		Stadium: Azadi Stadium; Attendance: 75,000; Referee: Taj Addin Fares (SYR)

16 Oct 2001 World Cup 2002 Q	Thailand	1–1	Bahrain	Bangkok, Thailand
15:30 UTC+07	Srimaka 21'	Report	Ali 90+3'	Stadium: Rajamangala Stadium; Attendance: 20,000; Referee: Halim Abdul Hamid (MAS)

21 Oct 2001 World Cup 2002 Q	Saudi Arabia	4–1	Thailand	Riyadh, Saudi Arabia
20:30 UTC+03	Shehan 40'; Jumaan 50'; Al-Jaber 66' (pen.); Al-Harbi 73'	Report	Piturat 58'	Stadium: Prince Faisal bin Fahd Stadium; Attendance: 20,000; Referee: Brian Hall (USA)

== 2002 ==
10 Feb 2002 King's Cup 2002	Thailand	4–0	Singapore	Bangkok, Thailand
16:00 UTC+7	Anurak Srikerd 19'; Seksan Piturat 75'; Pitipong Kuldilok 76'; Kwanchai Fuangprakob 90'	Report		Stadium: Supachalasai Stadium; Attendance: 25,000; Referee: Halim Abdul Hamid (Malaysia)

12 Feb 2002 King's Cup 2002	Thailand	1–0	Qatar	Bangkok, Thailand
20:00 UTC+7	Pitipong 19'	Report		Stadium: Supachalasai Stadium; Attendance: 15,000

14 Feb 2002 King's Cup 2002	Thailand	0–1	North Korea	Bangkok, Thailand
20:00 UTC+7		Report	Lee Oun Choy 60'	Stadium: Supachalasai Stadium

16 Feb 2002 King's Cup 2002	Thailand	0–0 (3–4 p)	North Korea	Bangkok, Thailand
20:00 UTC+7		Report		Stadium: Supachalasai Stadium; Attendance: 20,000
	Penalties
	Myong Song-chol (penalty scored); Kim Yong-jun (penalty scored); Ri Kwang-chon (penalty scored); Ri Man-chol (penalty missed); So Mon-chol (penalty scored)		(penalty scored) Sakda Joemdee; (penalty scored) Anurak Srikerd; (penalty scored) Therdsak Chaiman; (penalty missed) Surachai Jirasirichote; (penalty missed) Jakkapan Panpee

11 May 2002 Friendly	China	3–1	Thailand	Kunming, China
	Su Maozhen 78', 81', 88'		Manit Noywech 63'	Stadium: Kunming Tuodong Sports Center; Attendance: 6,000; Referee: Halim Abdul Hamid (Malaysia)

8 Dec 2002 Friendly	Thailand	2–1	Vietnam	Bangkok, Thailand
	Therdsak Chaiman 24', 56'	Report	Huỳnh Hồng Sơn 13'	Stadium: Supachalasai Stadium

18 Dec 2002 Tiger Cup 2002	Thailand	5–1	Laos	Kallang, Singapore
17:35 UTC+8	Worrawoot 1', 24'; Kiatisuk 8', 83', 90'	Report	Phaphouvanin 66'	Stadium: National Stadium; Attendance: 7,000; Referee: Vijay Rahman (Singapore)

20 Dec 2002 Tiger Cup 2002	Malaysia	3–1	Thailand	Kallang, Singapore
17:35 UTC+8	Rizal 45'; Hazman 66'; Indra 86'	Report	Therdsak 23'	Stadium: National Stadium; Attendance: 7,000; Referee: Luong The Tai (Vietnam)

22 Dec 2002 Tiger Cup 2002	Singapore	1–1	Thailand	Kallang, Singapore
19:35 UTC+8	Noor Ali 44'	Report	Woorawoot 15'	Stadium: National Stadium; Attendance: 20,000; Referee: Jerry Andres (Philippines)

27 Dec 2002 Tiger Cup 2002	Vietnam	0–4	Thailand	Jakarta, Indonesia
16:05 UTC+7			Woorawoot 24'; Narongchai 42'; Manit 75'; Sakda 90'	Stadium: Gelora Bung Karno Stadium; Referee: Santhan Nagalingham (Singapore)

29 Dec 2002 Tiger Cup 2002	Indonesia	2–2 (2–4 p)	Thailand	Jakarta, Indonesia
19:00 UTC+7	Yaris 46'; Gendut 79'		Chukiat 26'; Therdsak 38'	Stadium: Gelora Bung Karno Stadium; Attendance: 100,000; Referee: Subkhiddin Mohd Salleh (Malaysia)
	Penalties
	Bambang (penalty scored); Sugiantoro (penalty missed); Sandy (penalty missed); Imran (penalty scored)		(penalty missed) Kiatisuk; (penalty scored) Sakda; (penalty scored) Therdsak; (penalty scored) Manit; (penalty scored) Dusit

== 2003 ==
16 Feb 2003 King's Cup 2003	Thailand	2–2	North Korea	Bangkok, Thailand
16:30 UTC+7	Sarayuth 27'; Datsakorn 55'		Kim Yong-jun 54'; Kim Myong-won 87'	Stadium: Supachalasai Stadium

18 Feb 2003 King's Cup 2003	Thailand	1–1	Qatar	Bangkok, Thailand
16:30 UTC+7	Therdsak 55' (pen.)		Mohammed Salem Al-Enazi 86'	Stadium: Supachalasai Stadium; Referee: Lee Gi-Young (South Korea)

20 Feb 2003 King's Cup 2003	Thailand	1–4	Sweden	Bangkok, Thailand
17:30 UTC+7	Narongchai Vachiraban 80'		Thanongsak 47' (o.g.); Elmander 63'; Fernerud 66'; Majstorovic 69'	Stadium: Supachalasai Stadium

22 Feb 2003 King's Cup 2003	Thailand	3–1	Qatar	Bangkok, Thailand
15:30 UTC+7	Manit 24', 33'; Pichitphong 76'		Sayed Bechir 57'	Stadium: Supachalasai Stadium

16 Oct 2003 Friendly	Thailand	2–0	India	Bangkok, Thailand
	Peeratat Phoruendee 64'; Sarayuth Chaikamdee 78'			Stadium: Thai-Japanese Stadium

6 Nov 2003 Asian Cup 2004 Q	Tajikistan	1–0	Thailand	Tashkent, Uzbekistan
17:00 UTC+5	Fuzailov 79'			Stadium: Pakhtakor Stadium

8 Nov 2003 Asian Cup 2004 Q	Uzbekistan	3–0	Thailand	Tashkent, Uzbekistan
18:00 UTC+5	Maxim Shatskikh 23'; Vladimir Shishelov 27', 70'			Stadium: Pakhtakor Stadium; Referee: Moghaddam Rahimi (Iran)

10 Nov 2003 Asian Cup 2004 Q	Hong Kong	2–1	Thailand	Tashkent, Uzbekistan
17:00 UTC+5	Cheung Sai Ho 28'; Wong Chun Yue 69'		Datsakorn Thonglao 64'	Stadium: Pakhtakor Stadium

17 Nov 2003 Asian Cup 2004 Q	Thailand	4–0	Hong Kong	Bangkok, Thailand
17:30 UTC+7	Manit Noywech 24'; Datsakorn Thonglao 35'; Sarayoot Chaikamdee 79', 88' (pen.)			Stadium: Rajamangala Stadium

19 Nov 2003 Asian Cup 2004 Q	Thailand	1–0	Tajikistan	Bangkok, Thailand
17:30 UTC+7	Chaiman 83'			Stadium: Rajamangala Stadium

21 Nov 2003 Asian Cup 2004 Q	Thailand	4–1	Uzbekistan	Bangkok, Thailand
17:30 UTC+7	Manit Noywech 38'; Nirut Surasiang 56'; Piyawat Thongman 78'; Sarayoot Chaikamdee 81'	Report	Leonid Koshelev 88'	Stadium: Rajamangala Stadium; Attendance: 25,000

== 2004 ==
18 Feb 2004 World Cup 2006 Q	United Arab Emirates	1–0	Thailand	Al Ain, United Arab Emirates
19:15 UTC+4	Mohamed Rashid 22'	Report		Stadium: Sheikh Khalifa International Stadium; Attendance: 4,000; Referee: Sun Baojie (China PR)

31 Mar 2004 World Cup 2006 Q	Yemen	0–3	Thailand	Sana'a, Yemen
16:00 UTC+3		Report	Sarayoot Chaikamdee 69'; Nirut Surasiang 71'; Kiatisuk Senamuang 88'	Stadium: Althawra Sports City Stadium; Attendance: 25,000; Referee: Mohammad Mansour (Lebanon)

9 Jun 2004 World Cup 2006 Q	Thailand	1–4	North Korea	Bangkok, Thailand
19:00 UTC+7	Kiatisuk Senamuang 51'	Report	Kim Yong-su 42', 71'; Sin Yong-Nam 52'; Hong Yong-Jo 67'	Stadium: Rajamangala Stadium; Attendance: 30,000; Referee: Vladislav Tseytlin (Uzbekistan)

5 Jul 2004 Friendly	Thailand	0–2	Bahrain	Bangkok, Thailand
17:45 UTC+7			A'ala Hubail 53'; Husain Ali 75'	Stadium: Supachalasai Stadium

8 Jul 2004 Friendly	Thailand	0–0	Jordan	Bangkok, Thailand
				Stadium: Supachalasai Stadium

10 Jul 2004 Friendly	Thailand	3–2	Trinidad and Tobago	Bangkok, Thailand
	Narongchai Vachiraban 47'; Sutee Suksomkit 53'; Pichitphong Choeichiu 87'		Tony Rougier 17'; Gary Glasgow 30'	Stadium: Supachalasai Stadium; Attendance: 3,000

20 Jul 2004 Asian Cup 2004	Iran	3–0	Thailand	Chongqing, China
20:30 UTC+8	Enayati 71'; Nekounam 80'; Daei 86' (pen.)	Report		Stadium: Chongqing Olympic Sports Center; Attendance: 37,000; Referee: Mohammad Kousa (Syria)

24 Jul 2004 Asian Cup 2004	Thailand	1–4	Japan	Chongqing, China
20:30 UTC+8	Suksomkit 12'	Report	Nakamura 21'; Nakazawa 57', 87'; Fukunishi 68'	Stadium: Chongqing Olympic Sports Center; Attendance: 45,000; Referee: Fareed Al-Marzouqi (UAE)

28 Jul 2004 Asian Cup 2004	Oman	2–0	Thailand	Chengdu, China
18:15 UTC+8	Viwatchaichok 15' (o.g.); Al-Hosni 49'	Report		Stadium: Sichuan Longquanyi Stadium; Attendance: 13,000; Referee: Lu Jun (China)

19 Aug 2004 Friendly	Thailand	1–2	Malaysia	Bangkok, Thailand
	Therdsak 90'	Report	Liew 9'; Saravanan 58'	Stadium: Supachalasai Stadium

8 Sep 2004 World Cup 2006 Q	North Korea	4–1	Thailand	Pyongyang, North Korea
16:00 UTC+9	Ahn Young-Hak 49', 73'; Hong Yong-Jo 55'; Ri Hyok-chol 60'	Report	Suksomkit 72'	Stadium: Yanggakdo Stadium; Attendance: 20,000; Referee: Masoud Moradi (Iran)

8 Oct 2004 Friendly	Thailand	2–3	Jordan	Pathum Thani, Thailand
	Narasak Saisang 24'; Therdsak Chaiman 55'	Report	Abdel-Hadi Al-Maharmeh 28', 42'; Mustafa Shehdeh 61'	Stadium: Thammasat Stadium

13 Oct 2004 World Cup 2006 Q	Thailand	3–0	United Arab Emirates	Bangkok, Thailand
19:00 UTC+7	Jakapong 10'; Nanok 30'; Chaiman 67'	Report		Stadium: Rajamangala Stadium; Attendance: 15,000; Referee: Yuichi Nishimura (Japan)

17 Nov 2004 World Cup 2006 Q	Thailand	1–1	Yemen	Bangkok, Thailand
19:00 UTC+7	Siriwong 95'	Report	Al-Shehri 69'	Stadium: Rajamangala Stadium; Attendance: 15,000; Referee: Purushothaman Baskar (India)

30 Nov 2004 King's Cup 2004	Thailand	0–0 (4–3 p)	Estonia	Bangkok, Thailand
19:00 UTC+7				Stadium: Supachalasai Stadium

1 Dec 2004 King's Cup 2004	Thailand	1–1 (4–5 p)	Slovakia	Bangkok, Thailand
19:00 UTC+7	Sakda 13' (pen.)		Ďurica 67' (pen.)	Stadium: Supachalasai Stadium

10 Dec 2004 Tiger Cup 2004	Thailand	1–1	Myanmar	Kuala Lumpur, Malaysia
18:00 UTC+8	Therdsak Chaiman 14'	Report	Zaw Linn Tun 89'	Stadium: Bukit Jalil National Stadium; Referee: Masoud Moradi (Iran)

12 Dec 2004 Tiger Cup 2004	Timor-Leste	0–8	Thailand	Kuala Lumpur, Malaysia
18:00 UTC+8		Report	Banluesak Yodyingyong 17'; Suriya Domtaisong 41'; Weerayut Jitkuntod 53'; Therdsak Chaiman 59'; Sarayoot Chaikamdee 63', 65', 67'; Yuttajak Kornjan 84'	Stadium: Bukit Jalil National Stadium; Referee: Vo Minh Tri (Vietnam)

14 Dec 2004 Tiger Cup 2004	Malaysia	2–1	Thailand	Kuala Lumpur, Malaysia
18:00 UTC+8	Muhamad Khalid Jamlus 63', 65'	Report	Sarayoot Chaikamdee 45'	Stadium: Bukit Jalil National Stadium; Attendance: 10,000; Referee: Masoud Moradi (Iran)

16 Dec 2004 Tiger Cup 2004	Thailand	3–1	Philippines	Kuala Lumpur, Malaysia
18:00 UTC+8	Ittipol Poolsap 42'; Sarif Sainui 56'; Suriya Domtaisong 89'	Report	Emelio Caligdong 27'	Stadium: KLFA Stadium; Attendance: 300; Referee: Subash Anthony Lazar (Singapore)

21 Dec 2004 Friendly	Thailand	1–5	Germany	Bangkok, Thailand
19:00 UTC+7	Chaikamdee 57'	Report	Kurányi 34', 38'; Podolski 73', 89'; Asamoah 84'	Stadium: Rajamangala Stadium; Attendance: 15,000; Referee: Shamsul Maidin (Singapore)

== 2005 ==
24 Dec 2005 King's Cup 2005	Thailand	1–1	Latvia	Phang Nga, Thailand
16:00 UTC+7	Teeratep Winothai 56'		Genādijs Soloņicins 19'	Stadium: Phang Nga Province Stadium

26 Dec 2005 King's Cup 2005	Thailand	1–0	Oman	Phuket, Thailand
18:15 UTC+7	Ekaphan Inthasen 2'			Stadium: Surakul Stadium

28 Dec 2005 King's Cup 2005	Thailand	0–2	North Korea	Phuket, Thailand
18:15 UTC+7		Report	Kim Chol-ho 7'; Hong Yong-jo 11'	Stadium: Surakul Stadium

== 2006 ==
1 Feb 2006 Friendly	Thailand	0–0	Jordan	Ayutthaya, Thailand
		Report		Stadium: Ayutthaya Stadium

16 Feb 2006 Friendly	Thailand	4–3	Iraq	Ayutthaya, Thailand
	Prat Samakrat 2'; Ali Hussein Rehema 10' (o.g.); Nirut Kamsawad 12'; Apichet Puttan 57'	Report (Iraq); Report (Thai)	Emad Mohammed 8', 43', 89'	Stadium: Ayutthaya Stadium; Attendance: 25,000; Referee: Anucha Waiyabot (Thailand)

26 Mar 2006 Friendly	Thailand	5–0	Philippines	Chonburi, Thailand
	Jakkrit Bunkham 13'; Teeratep Winothai 19', 44'; Kittisak Jaihan 58'; Phaisan Pona 90'	Report		Stadium: Chon Buri Municipality Stadium

10 Aug 2006 Friendly	China	4–0	Thailand	Qinhuangdao, China
	Li Jinyu 4'; Wang Dong 62'; Du Zhenyu 74'; Xu Liang 77'	Report		Stadium: Qinhuangdao Olympic Sports Center Stadium

24 Dec 2006 King's Cup 2006	Thailand	2–1	Vietnam	Bangkok, Thailand
18:30 UTC+7	Sarayuth Chaikamdee 36'; Datsakorn Thonglao 61'		Phan Thanh Binh 35'	Stadium: Suphachalasai Stadium

26 Dec 2006 King's Cup 2006	Thailand	2–0	Singapore	Bangkok, Thailand
19:00 UTC+7	Kiatisuk Senamuang 58', 63'			Stadium: Suphachalasai Stadium

28 Dec 2006 King's Cup 2006	Thailand	2–2	Kazakhstan	Bangkok, Thailand
19:00 UTC+7	Suchao Nuchnum 41'; Pipat Thonkanya 58'		Rodionov 66'; Ashirbekov 70'	Stadium: Suphachalasai Stadium

30 Dec 2006 King's Cup 2006	Thailand	3–1	Vietnam	Bangkok, Thailand
18:30 UTC+7	Sutee Suksomkit 38'; Pipat Thonkanya 41'; Suchao Nuchnum 58'		Phan Thanh Binh 68'	Stadium: Suphachalasai Stadium

== 2007 ==
12 Jan 2007 AFF Cup 2007	Thailand	1–1	Myanmar	Bangkok, Thailand
19:00 UTC+7	Suchao Nutnum 90+4'	Report	Si Thu Win 25'	Stadium: Suphachalasai Stadium; Attendance: 15,000; Referee: Hajime Matsuo (Japan)

14 Jan 2007 AFF Cup 2007	Thailand	4–0	Philippines	Bangkok, Thailand
19:00 UTC+7	Sarayoot Chaikamdee 15', 28'; Pipat Thonkanya 21'; Natthaphong Samana 84'	Report		Stadium: Suphachalasai Stadium; Attendance: 30,000; Referee: Hajime Matsuo (Japan)

16 Jan 2007 AFF Cup 2007	Thailand	1–0	Malaysia	Bangkok, Thailand
19:00 UTC+7	Sarayoot Chaikamdee 48'	Report		Stadium: Suphachalasai Stadium; Attendance: 25,000; Referee: Hajime Matsuo (Japan)

24 Jan 2007 AFF Cup 2007	Vietnam	0–2	Thailand	Hanoi, Vietnam
19:00 UTC+7		Report	Datsakorn Thonglao 28'; Pipat Thonkanya 81'	Stadium: Mỹ Đình National Stadium; Attendance: 40,000; Referee: Jimmy Napitupulu (Indonesia)

28 Jan 2007 AFF Cup 2007	Thailand	0–0	Vietnam	Bangkok, Thailand
19:00 UTC+7		Report		Stadium: Suphachalasai Stadium; Attendance: 35,000; Referee: Suresh Srinivasan (India)

31 Jan 2007 AFF Cup 2007	Singapore	2–1	Thailand	Kallang, Singapore
20:00 UTC+8	Noh Alam Shah 17'; Mustafic Fahrudin 83' (pen.)	Report	Pipat Thonkanya 50'	Stadium: National Stadium; Attendance: 55,000; Referee: C. Ravichandran (Malaysia)

4 Feb 2007 AFF Cup 2007	Thailand	1–1	Singapore	Bangkok, Thailand
19:00 UTC+7	Pipat Thonkanya 37'	Report	Khairul Amri 81'	Stadium: Suphachalasai Stadium; Attendance: 40,000; Referee: Jimmy Napitupulu (Indonesia)

16 May 2007 Friendly	Thailand	1–0	China	Bangkok, Thailand
19:00 UTC+7	Pipat Thonkanya 40'			Stadium: Rajamangala Stadium

6 Jun 2007 Friendly	Thailand	1–3	Netherlands	Bangkok, Thailand
19:00 UTC+7	Tawan Sripan 65'		Rafael van der Vaart 3'; John Heitinga 42'; Jan Vennegoor of Hesselink 55'	Stadium: Rajamangala Stadium

2 Jul 2007 Friendly	Thailand	2–0	Qatar	Bangkok, Thailand
19:00 UTC+7	Tawan Sripan 8'; Sutee Suksomkit 69' (pen.)			Stadium: Rajamangala Stadium

7 Jul 2007 Asian Cup 2007	Thailand	1–1	Iraq	Bangkok, Thailand
19:30 UTC+7	Sutee Suksomkit 6' (pen.)	Report	Younis Mahmoud 32'	Stadium: Rajamangala Stadium; Attendance: 30,000; Referee: Kwon Jong-Chul (South Korea)

12 Jul 2007 Asian Cup 2007	Thailand	2–0	Oman	Bangkok, Thailand
17:20 UTC+7	Pipat Thonkanya 70', 78'	Report		Stadium: Rajamangala Stadium; Attendance: 19,000; Referee: Lee Gi-Young (South Korea)

16 Jul 2007 Asian Cup 2007	Thailand	0–4	Australia	Bangkok, Thailand
19:35 UTC+7		Report	Michael Beauchamp 21'; Mark Viduka 80', 83'; Harry Kewell 90'	Stadium: Rajamangala Stadium; Attendance: 46,000; Referee: Kwon Jong-Chul (South Korea)

3 Oct 2007 Friendly	Thailand	1–1	United Arab Emirates	Bangkok, Thailand
19:00 UTC+7	Pipat Thonkanya 73'		Nawaf Mubarak 88'	Stadium: Suphachalasai Stadium; Referee: Chawalit Sanawai (Thailand)

8 Oct 2007 World Cup 2010 Q	Thailand	6–1	Macau	Bangkok, Thailand
19:00 UTC+7	Sarayoot Chaikamdee 12', 49'; Teerasil Dangda 21'; Teeratep Winothai 55' (pen.); Patiparn Phetphun 82'; Datsakorn Thonglao 90+1'	Report	Kin Seng Chan 23'	Stadium: Suphachalasai Stadium; Attendance: 11,254; Referee: Kadyrbek Chynybekov (Kyrgyzstan)

15 Oct 2007 World Cup 2010 Q	Macau	1–7	Thailand	Taipa, Macau
20:00 UTC+8	Kin Seng Chan 90+2'	Report	Teerasil Dangda 22'; Suree Sukha 39'; Nirut Surasiang 43'; Datsakorn Thonglao 48'; Sarayoot Chaikamdee 53', 57', 86'	Stadium: Sports Field and Pavilion at MUST; Attendance: 500; Referee: Abdulrahman Racho (Syria)

9 Nov 2007 World Cup 2010 Q	Yemen	1–1	Thailand	Sana'a, Yemen
16:15 UTC+3	Ali Al-Nono 43'	Report	Sarayuth Chaikamdee 35'	Stadium: Ali Mohsen Al-Muraisi Stadium; Referee: Khalil Al Ghamdi (Saudi Arabia)

18 Nov 2007 World Cup 2010 Q	Thailand	1–0	Yemen	Bangkok, Thailand
17:00 UTC+7	Sarayuth Chaikamdee 16'	Report		Stadium: Suphachalasai Stadium; Attendance: 29,000; Referee: Kazuhiko Matsumura (Japan)

22 Dec 2007 King's Cup 2007	Thailand	3–2	Uzbekistan	Bangkok, Thailand
17:00 UTC+7	Sarayoot Chaikamdee 9' (pen.), 40'; Nataporn Phanrit 90'	Report	Farhod Tadjiyev 44', 60'	Stadium: Rajamangala Stadium; Attendance: 3,000

26 Dec 2007 King's Cup 2007	Thailand	1–0	North Korea	Bangkok, Thailand
18:45 UTC+7	Phetphun 54'			Stadium: Rajamangala Stadium

== 2008 ==
6 Feb 2008 World Cup 2010 Q	Japan	4–1	Thailand	Saitama, Japan
19:20 UTC+9	Yasuhito Endō 21'; Yoshito Ōkubo 54'; Yuji Nakazawa 66'; Seiichiro Maki 90+1'	Report	Teeratep Winothai 22'	Stadium: Saitama Stadium; Referee: Khalil Al Ghamdi (Saudi Arabia)

15 Mar 2008 Friendly	China	3–3	Thailand	Kunming, China
	Qu Bo 34'; Han Peng 67'; Zhu Ting 90'		Teeratep Winothai 49', 63'; Tana Chanabut 81'	Stadium: Kunming Tuodong Sports Center

26 Mar 2008 World Cup 2010 Q	Thailand	0–1	Oman	Bangkok, Thailand
18:30 UTC+7		Report	Sulaiman 1'	Stadium: Rajamangala National Stadium; Attendance: 40,000; Referee: Mohsen Torky (Iran)

20 May 2008 Friendly	Thailand	7–0	Nepal	Bangkok, Thailand
	Teerasil Dangda 46', 67'; Suchao Nutnum 51'; Ronnachai Rangsiyo 58'; Teeratep Winothai 69', 87' (pen.); Sarayoot Chaikamdee 79'			Stadium: Rajamangala National Stadium

25 May 2008 Friendly	Thailand	2–1	Iraq	Bangkok, Thailand
16:50 UTC+7	Teeratep Winothai 51'; Teerasil Dangda 59'		Nashat Akram 88'	Stadium: Rajamangala National Stadium

2 Jun 2008 World Cup 2010 Q	Thailand	2–3	Bahrain	Bangkok, Thailand
18:30 UTC+7	Sarayoot Chaikamdee 25'; Teeratep Winothai 45'	Report	Salman Isa 22'; Ismaeel Abdullatif 34'; Sayed Mohamed Adnan 57'	Stadium: Rajamangala National Stadium; Attendance: 15,000; Referee: Sun Baojie (China PR)

7 Jun 2008 World Cup 2010 Q	Bahrain	1–1	Thailand	Riffa, Bahrain
19:30 UTC+3	Salman Ghuloom 67'	Report	Datsakorn Thonglao 65'	Stadium: Bahrain National Stadium; Attendance: 21,000; Referee: Muhsen Basma (Syria)

14 Jun 2008 World Cup 2010 Q	Thailand	0–3	Japan	Bangkok, Thailand
17:30 UTC+7		Report	Tulio 23'; Nakazawa 39'; K. Nakamura 89'	Stadium: Rajamangala National Stadium; Attendance: 25,000; Referee: Ali Hamad Al-Badwawi (UAE)

22 Jun 2008 World Cup 2010 Q	Oman	2–1	Thailand	Muscat, Oman
18:00 UTC+4	Amad Al Hosni 58', 85'	Report	Totchtawan Sripan 3' (pen.)	Stadium: Royal Oman Police Stadium; Attendance: 3,000; Referee: Salem Mujghef (Jordan)

28 Oct 2008 T&T Cup 2008	Thailand	1–0	North Korea	Hanoi, Vietnam
	Patiparn Phetphun 90+3'			Stadium: Mỹ Đình National Stadium

8 Nov 2008 Friendly	Saudi Arabia	1–0	Thailand	Riyadh, Saudi Arabia
	Naif Hazazi 64'			Stadium: King Fahd International Stadium

16 Nov 2008 T&T Cup 2008	Vietnam	2–2	Thailand	Hanoi, Vietnam
	Nguyễn Việt Thắng 52'; Nguyễn Minh Phương 88'	Report	Nattaporn Phanrit 32'; Teerasil Dangda 82'	Stadium: Mỹ Đình National Stadium

6 Dec 2008 AFF Cup 2008	Thailand	2–0	Vietnam	Phuket, Thailand
19:30 UTC+7	Sutee Suksomkit 34'; Suchao Nutnum 45+4'			Stadium: Surakul Stadium; Attendance: 20,000; Referee: Malik Abdul Bashir (Singapore)

8 Dec 2008 AFF Cup 2008	Thailand	6–0	Laos	Phuket, Thailand
19:30 UTC+7	Ronnachai Rangsiyo 19'; Patiparn Phetphun 30'; Arthit Sunthornpit 40', 52'; Anon Sangsanoi 79', 89'			Stadium: Surakul Stadium; Attendance: 15,000; Referee: Mohamed Hadimin (Brunei)

10 Dec 2008 AFF Cup 2008	Thailand	3–0	Malaysia	Phuket, Thailand
17:00 UTC+7	Sutee Suksomkit 23'; Teerasil Dangda 46', 76'			Stadium: Surakul Stadium; Attendance: 15,000; Referee: Malik Abdul Bashir (Singapore)

16 Dec 2008 AFF Cup 2008	Indonesia	0–1	Thailand	Jakarta, Indonesia
19:00 UTC+7		Report	Teerasil Dangda 6'	Stadium: Gelora Bung Karno Stadium; Attendance: 70,000; Referee: Võ Minh Trí (Vietnam)

20 Dec 2008 AFF Cup 2008	Thailand	2–1	Indonesia	Bangkok, Thailand
19:00 UTC+7	Teeratep Winothai 73'; Ronnachai Rangsiyo 89'	Report	Nova Arianto 9'	Stadium: Rajamangala National Stadium; Attendance: 40,000; Referee: Mohamed Hadimin (Brunei)

24 Dec 2008 AFF Cup 2008	Thailand	1–2	Vietnam	Bangkok, Thailand
19:00 UTC+7	Ronnachai Rangsiyo 75'	Report	Nguyễn Vũ Phong 40'; Lê Công Vinh 42'	Stadium: Rajamangala National Stadium; Attendance: 50,000; Referee: Ramachandran Krishnan (Malaysia)

28 Dec 2008 AFF Cup 2008	Vietnam	1–1	Thailand	Hanoi, Vietnam
19:00 UTC+7	Lê Công Vinh 90+4'	Report	Teerasil Dangda 21'	Stadium: Mỹ Đình National Stadium; Attendance: 40,000; Referee: Malik Abdul Bashir (Singapore)

== 2009 ==
14 Jan 2009 Asian Cup 2011 Q	Jordan	0–0	Thailand	Amman, Jordan
17:00 UTC+2		Report		Stadium: Amman International Stadium; Attendance: 5,000; Referee: Abdul-Rahman Rashu (Syria)

21 Jan 2009 King's Cup 2009	Thailand	2–1	Lebanon	Phuket, Thailand
17:00 UTC+7	Teerasil Dangda 11'; Suchao Nutnum 22'	Report	Mahmoud El Ali 51'	Stadium: Surakul Stadium; Attendance: 15,000; Referee: Prayoon Veerapool (Thailand)

28 Jan 2009 Asian Cup 2011 Q	Thailand	0–0	Iran	Bangkok, Thailand
18:30 UTC+7		Report		Stadium: Rajamangala Stadium; Attendance: 10,000; Referee: Valentin Kovalenko (Uzbekistan)

5 Feb 2009 Friendly	Saudi Arabia	2–1	Thailand	Sendai, Japan
	Ryan Belal 62'; Sultan Al-Nemri 65'		Teerasil Dangda 89'

28 Mar 2009 Friendly	Thailand	3–1	New Zealand	Bangkok, Thailand
18:30 UTC+7	Teerasil Dangda 15', 71'; Tawan Sripan 21'		Kris Bright 13'	Stadium: Supachalasai Stadium

8 Nov 2009 Friendly	Thailand	1–1	Syria	Nonthaburi, Thailand
17:00 UTC+7	Teeratep Winothai 60'		Raja Rafe 35' (pen.)	Stadium: Thunderdome Stadium

14 Nov 2009 Asian Cup 2011 Q	Singapore	1–3	Thailand	Kallang, Singapore
19:30 UTC+8	Mustafic Fahrudin 84' (pen.)	Report	Sutee Suksomkit 12' (pen.), 81'; Therdsak Chaiman 75'	Stadium: National Stadium; Attendance: 22,183; Referee: Hiroyoshi Takayama (Japan)

18 Nov 2009 Asian Cup 2011 Q	Thailand	0–1	Singapore	Bangkok, Thailand
19:00 UTC+7		Report	Đurić 38'	Stadium: Rajamangala Stadium; Attendance: 30,000; Referee: Abdullah Balideh (Qatar)

== Head-to-head records ==
Thailand national football team head-to-head records (2000–2009)
Opponent	Pld	W	D	L	GF	GA	GD	Pts	Confederation
Australia	1	0	0	1	0	4	–4	0	AFC
Bahrain	4	0	3	1	4	5	–1	3	AFC
Brazil	1	0	0	1	0	7	–7	0	CONMEBOL
China	4	1	1	2	5	10	–5	4	AFC
Chinese Taipei	2	2	0	0	3	0	+3	6	AFC
Estonia	2	1	1	0	2	1	+1	4	UEFA
Finland	2	1	1	0	5	1	+4	4	UEFA
Germany	1	0	0	1	1	5	–4	0	UEFA
Hong Kong	2	1	0	1	5	2	+3	3	AFC
India	1	1	0	0	2	0	+2	3	AFC
Indonesia	4	3	1	0	11	4	+7	10	AFC
Iran	4	0	3	1	1	4	–3	3	AFC
Iraq	4	1	2	1	5	7	–2	5	AFC
Japan	3	0	0	3	2	11	–9	0	AFC
Jordan	4	0	2	2	2	4	–2	2	AFC
Kazakhstan	1	0	1	0	2	2	0	1	UEFA
Kuwait	2	1	0	1	7	7	0	3	AFC
Kyrgyzstan	1	1	0	0	3	1	+2	3	AFC
Laos	2	2	0	0	11	1	+10	6	AFC
Latvia	1	0	1	0	1	1	0	1	UEFA
Lebanon	3	2	1	0	5	3	+2	7	AFC
Macau	2	2	0	0	13	2	+11	6	AFC
Malaysia	6	4	0	2	13	9	+4	12	AFC
Myanmar	3	1	2	0	5	3	+2	5	AFC
Nepal	1	1	0	0	7	0	+7	3	AFC
Netherlands	1	0	0	1	1	3	–2	0	UEFA
New Zealand	1	1	0	0	3	1	+2	3	OFC
North Korea	6	3	2	1	9	7	+2	11	AFC
Oman	4	2	0	2	4	5	–1	6	AFC
Pakistan	2	2	0	0	9	0	+9	6	AFC
Philippines	4	4	0	0	14	1	+13	12	AFC
Qatar	6	3	2	1	11	8	+3	11	AFC
Saudi Arabia	3	0	0	3	2	8	–6	0	AFC
Singapore	6	3	2	1	11	5	+6	11	AFC
Slovakia	1	0	1	0	1	1	0	1	UEFA
Sri Lanka	2	2	0	0	7	2	+5	6	AFC
Sweden	2	0	0	2	2	8	–6	0	UEFA
Syria	2	0	2	0	2	2	0	2	AFC
Tajikistan	2	1	0	1	1	1	0	3	AFC
Timor-Leste	1	1	0	0	8	0	+8	3	AFC
Trinidad and Tobago	1	1	0	0	3	2	+1	3	CONCACAF
United Arab Emirates	3	1	1	1	4	2	+2	4	AFC
Uzbekistan	4	3	0	1	9	6	+3	9	AFC
Vietnam	7	5	1	1	15	5	+10	16	AFC
Yemen	3	2	1	0	5	1	+4	7	AFC
Total	96	49	26	21	207	122	+85	173	
