= 2000 AFC Asian Cup qualification =

Tournament details
- Dates: 3 August 1999 – 11 April 2000
- Teams: 42 (from 1 confederation)

Tournament statistics
- Top scorer: (Kuwait) Bashar Abdullah (15 goals)

Qualification for 2000 AFC Asian Cup took place between 3 August 1999 and 11 April 2000. In total, 42 teams competed for 10 places at the finals. Lebanon and Saudi Arabia qualified automatically as holders and hosts respectively.

Three teams which had not competed in the AFC Asian Cup – Bhutan, Mongolia and Palestine – made their debuts in the qualifying stages.

During the competition, the record for the largest margin of victory in an international match was broken twice. China defeated Guam 19–0 on 20 January 2000 before Kuwait defeated Bhutan 20–0 on 14 February 2000.

After 360 goals were scored across 84 matches, China, Indonesia, Iran, Iraq, Japan, Kuwait, Qatar, South Korea, Thailand and Uzbekistan qualified for the 2000 AFC Asian Cup.

== Background ==
The inaugural AFC Asian Cup was held in Hong Kong in 1956. Saudi Arabia were the defending champions after defeating hosts the United Arab Emirates 4–2 on penalties in the final of the previous edition in 1996. Iran and Saudi Arabia were jointly the most successful teams in the history of the competition, having each won the title three times previously.

Iran and South Korea had qualified for the finals a record eight times. Iran had qualified for each of the last eight tournaments consecutively. China and the United Arab Emirates had the next longest ongoing consecutive qualification streaks at six and five, respectively.

Bhutan, Mongolia and Palestine entered the qualification stages for the AFC Asian Cup for the first time.

== Format ==
In total, 42 teams were included in the qualification draw. They were drawn into 10 round robin groups – one of three teams, six of four teams and three of five teams. Groups one, three, four, five, six, nine and 10 were played as single round robin tournamnts with all matches played in a single host city. Groups two and eight were played as double round robin tournaments with matches split evenly between two host cities. Group seven was also played as a double round robin tournament but matches were played on a home-and-away basis. The winner of each of the 10 groups would qualify for the 2000 AFC Asian Cup.

== Group 1 ==
Matches were played at the Central in Dushanbe, Tajikistan. Iraq qualified for the 2000 AFC Asian Cup.

=== Table ===
Pos	Team	Pld	W	D	L	GF	GA	GD	Pts	Qualification
1	Iraq	3	3	0	0	9	2	+7	9	Qualification for the 2000 AFC Asian Cup
2	Tajikistan	3	2	0	1	6	5	+1	6	
3	Oman	3	1	0	2	4	4	0	3	
4	Kyrgyzstan	3	0	0	3	3	11	−8	0	

=== Matches ===
3 August 1999

Oman	3–0	Kyrgyzstan
Al-Wahaibi 7'; Al-Habsi 39', 90'

Central Stadium, Dushanbe
Attendance: 5,000
Referee: Saeed Abdullah Ibrahim (United Arab Emirates)
3 August 1999

Tajikistan	1–2	Iraq
Muminov 32' (pen.)		Hamad 28' (pen.); Jafar 90'

Central Stadium, Dushanbe

5 August 1999

Kyrgyzstan	2–3	Tajikistan
Zhumagulov 45'; Berdaly 75'		Muminov 6', 11' (pen.); Nazarov 57'

Central Stadium, Dushanbe
Attendance: 6,000
Referee: Saeed Abdullah Ibrahim (United Arab Emirates)
5 August 1999

Iraq	2–0	Oman
Farhan 55', 70'

Central Stadium, Dushanbe

7 August 1999

Tajikistan	2–1	Oman
Knyazev 21'; Kulbayev 29'		Al-Balushi 43'

Central Stadium, Dushanbe
7 August 1999

Iraq	5–1	Kyrgyzstan
Farhan 54'; Fawzi 60'; Hamad 62'; Obeid 67', 80'		Zakirov 51'

Central Stadium, Dushanbe
Attendance: 5,000
Referee: Fereydoun Esfahanian (Iran)

== Group 2 ==
Matches were played at the Al-Hamadaniah Stadium in Aleppo, Syria and the Azadi Stadium in Tehran, Iran. Iran qualified for the 2000 AFC Asian Cup.

=== Table ===
Pos	Team	Pld	W	D	L	GF	GA	GD	Pts	Qualification
1	Iran	6	4	1	1	16	2	+14	13	Qualification for the 2000 AFC Asian Cup
2	Syria	6	4	1	1	11	3	+8	13	
3	Bahrain	6	3	0	3	6	6	0	9	
4	Maldives	6	0	0	6	2	24	−22	0	

=== Matches ===
31 March 2000

Maldives	0–8	Iran
		Hasheminasab 2'; Dinmohammadi 9'; Mahdavikia 14'; Estili 19'; Daei 20', 27', 30'; Mousavi 50'

Al-Hamadaniah Stadium, Aleppo
31 March 2000

Syria	1–0	Bahrain
Taleb 64'

Al-Hamadaniah Stadium, Aleppo

2 April 2000

Bahrain	4–1	Maldives
Sahinni 2', 43'; Jaffer 55', 59'		Izema Katu Mohamed 83'

Al-Hamadaniah Stadium, Aleppo
2 April 2000

Syria	0–1	Iran
		Daei 55'

Al-Hamadaniah Stadium, Aleppo

4 April 2000

Bahrain	1–0	Iran
Mohammad Salman 17'

Al-Hamadaniah Stadium, Aleppo
4 April 2000

Syria	6–0	Maldives
Abaza 10'; Azzam 12'; Srour 30'; Al-Basha 50'; Hamami 70'; A. John 92' (o.g.)

Al-Hamadaniah Stadium, Aleppo

7 April 2000

Maldives	1–2	Syria
Latheef 90'		Al Zaher 10'; Kordieh 33'

Azadi Stadium, Tehran
7 April 2000

Iran	3–0	Bahrain
Fekri 57'; Karimi 72'; Daei 82'

Azadi Stadium, Tehran

9 April 2000

Maldives	0–1	Bahrain
		Wahab 47'

Azadi Stadium, Tehran
9 April 2000

Iran	1–1	Syria
Hasheminasab 40'		Al Sayed 15'

Azadi Stadium, Tehran

11 April 2000

Bahrain	0–1	Syria
		Haj Moustafa 24'

Azadi Stadium, Tehran
11 April 2000

Iran	3–0	Maldives
Abolghasempour 3'; Estili 32'; Daei 63' (pen.)

Azadi Stadium, Tehran

== Group 3 ==
Matches were played at the Tahnoun bin Mohammed Stadium in Al Ain, United Arab Emirates. Uzbekistan qualified for the 2000 AFC Asian Cup.

=== Table ===
Pos	Team	Pld	W	D	L	GF	GA	GD	Pts	Qualification
1	Uzbekistan	4	4	0	0	16	2	+14	12	Qualification for the 2000 AFC Asian Cup
2	United Arab Emirates	4	3	0	1	12	2	+10	9	
3	India	4	1	1	2	8	9	−1	4	
4	Bangladesh	4	1	1	2	5	12	−7	4	
5	Sri Lanka	4	0	0	4	2	18	−16	0	

=== Matches ===
21 November 1999

Bangladesh	0–6	Uzbekistan
		Kasymov 1'; Pirmatov 2'; Davletov 3'; Statskikh 30', 45+3'; Marifaliev 89'

Tahnoun bin Mohammed Stadium, Al Ain
Attendance: 15,000
Referee: Rashid Al-Hamdan (Saudi Arabia)
21 November 1999

United Arab Emirates	3–1	India
Al Kass 60', 85'; Jumaa 90' (pen.)		Vijayan 21'

Tahnoun bin Mohammed Stadium, Al Ain

23 November 1999

Sri Lanka	0–6	Uzbekistan
		Irismetov 3', 21'; Davletov 28'; Shirshov 29', 55'; Bazarov 71'

Tahnoun bin Mohammed Stadium, Al Ain
Referee: Selearajan Subraman (Malaysia)
23 November 1999

United Arab Emirates	3–0	Bangladesh
Abdulrahim Jumaa 4'; Mattar 17'; Khalil 21'

Tahnoun bin Mohammed Stadium, Al Ain

25 November 1999

Sri Lanka	1–3	Bangladesh
Amanulla 34'		Dawn 37'; Munna 61' (pen.); Faysal 64'

Tahnoun bin Mohammed Stadium, Al Ain
25 November 1999

India	2–3	Uzbekistan
Ancheri 18'; Vijayan 55'		Rakhmanqulov 17'; Fyodorov 77'; Shirshov 86'

Tahnoun bin Mohammed Stadium, Al Ain

27 November 1999

Sri Lanka	1–3	India
Perera 76'		Mondal 24'; R. Singh 40'; Pasha 65'

Tahnoun bin Mohammed Stadium, Al Ain
27 November 1999

United Arab Emirates	0–1	Uzbekistan
		Shatskikh 71'

Tahnoun bin Mohammed Stadium, Al Ain
Attendance: 23,000
Referee: Selearajan Subramaniam (Malaysia)

29 November 1999

India	2–2	Bangladesh
Vijayan 25'; Dias 50'		Alfaz 19', 49'

Tahnoun bin Mohammed Stadium, Al Ain
29 November 1999

United Arab Emirates	6–0	Sri Lanka
Khalil 28'; Al-Hammadi 39'; Al-Boloushi 45', 77'; Ali 63'; Omer 81'

Tahnoun bin Mohammed Stadium, Al Ain

== Group 4 ==
Matches were played at the Jassim bin Hamad Stadium in Al Rayyan and the Grand Hamad Stadium in Doha, Qatar. Qatar qualified for the 2000 AFC Asian Cup.

=== Table ===
Pos	Team	Pld	W	D	L	GF	GA	GD	Pts	Qualification
1	Qatar	4	3	1	0	11	3	+8	10	Qualification for the 2000 AFC Asian Cup
2	Kazakhstan	4	3	0	1	8	3	+5	9	
3	Jordan	4	2	1	1	12	4	+8	7	
4	Palestine	4	1	0	3	3	8	−5	3	
5	Pakistan	4	0	0	4	0	16	−16	0	

=== Matches ===
31 March 2000

Qatar	1–0	Palestine
Mustafa 16'

Jassim bin Hamad Stadium, Al Rayyan
31 March 2000

Jordan	0–1	Kazakhstan
		Avdeyev 10'

Grand Hamad Stadium, Doha

2 April 2000

Palestine	2–0	Pakistan
El-Manasri 1'; Al-Jaish 62'

Jassim bin Hamad Stadium, Al Rayyan
Attendance: 6,000
2 April 2000

Qatar	3–1	Kazakhstan
Nazmi 36'; Mustafa 39'; Al Enazi 73'		Avdeyev 82'

Jassim bin Hamad Stadium, Al Rayyan
Referee: Amin Samareh Moradi (Iran)

4 April 2000

Palestine	1–5	Jordan
Fahad 49'		Abu Zema 6', 22'; Abdullah 35'; Al-Khatib 37', 47'

Jassim bin Hamad Stadium, Al Rayyan
Attendance: 11,000
4 April 2000

Qatar	5–0	Pakistan
Nazmi 25' (pen.), 85' (pen.); Al Kuwari 51', 73'; Hassan 68'

Jassim bin Hamad Stadium, Al Rayyan

6 April 2000

Kazakhstan	2–0	Palestine
Kadyrkulov 38'; Litvinenko 90'

Jassim bin Hamad Stadium, Al Rayyan
Attendance: 2,500
Referee: Amin Samareh Moradi (Iran)
6 April 2000

Pakistan	0–5	Jordan
		Al-Sheikh 6'; Abu Raba 11'; Ghanem Hamarsheh 13', 34'; Al-Khatib 80'

Jassim bin Hamad Stadium, Al Rayyan

8 April 2000

Pakistan	0–4	Kazakhstan
		Zubarev 21', 43'; Kucheryavykh 60'; Klishin 72'

Jassim bin Hamad Stadium, Al Rayyan
8 April 2000

Qatar	2–2	Jordan
Al Kuwari 66'; Al Enazi 67'		Abu Zema 25'; Abdullah 45'

Jassim bin Hamad Stadium, Al Rayyan

== Group 5 ==
Matches were played at the Mohammed Al-Hamad Stadium in Hawally, Kuwait. Kuwait broke the record for the largest margin of victory in an international football match after their 20–0 win against Bhutan. Kuwait qualified for the 2000 AFC Asian Cup.

=== Table ===
Pos	Team	Pld	W	D	L	GF	GA	GD	Pts	Qualification
1	Kuwait	4	4	0	0	33	1	+32	12	Qualification for the 2000 AFC Asian Cup
2	Turkmenistan	4	3	0	1	15	6	+9	9	
3	Yemen	4	2	0	2	14	5	+9	6	
4	Nepal	4	1	0	3	3	13	−10	3	
5	Bhutan	4	0	0	4	2	42	−40	0	

=== Matches ===
10 February 2000

Kuwait	6–1	Turkmenistan
Haji 4'; Abdullah 16', 27'; Al-Houwaidi 17', 37'; Al-Khodari 90'		Agabaýew 89'

Mohammed Al-Hamad Stadium, Hawally
10 February 2000

Nepal	0–3	Yemen
		Tahous 27'; Al-Nono 32'; Al-Salimi 59' (pen.)

Mohammed Al-Hamad Stadium, Hawally

12 February 2000

Yemen	0–1	Turkmenistan
		Bayramov 79'

Mohammed Al-Hamad Stadium, Hawally
12 February 2000

Bhutan	0–3	Nepal
		Thapa 21'; Joshi 29'; Rayamajhi 60'

Mohammed Al-Hamad Stadium, Hawally

14 February 2000

Kuwait	20–0	Bhutan
Al-Houwaidi 4', 6' (pen.), 10', 52' (pen.), 60'; Abdullah 20', 24', 38', 45' (pen.), 47', 50', 59', 89'; Al-Mutairi 21', 51', 63'; Bakhit 31'; Al-Shammari 21'; Sakeen 65'; Jassem 77' (pen.)

Mohammed Al-Hamad Stadium, Hawally
14 February 2000

Turkmenistan	5–0	Nepal
Kulyýew 35'; Bayramov 39'; Muhadow 48', 61'; Agabaýew 89'

Mohammed Al-Hamad Stadium, Hawally

16 February 2000

Kuwait	2–0	Yemen
Mubarak 33'; Awad 51' (o.g.)

Mohammed Al-Hamad Stadium, Hawally
16 February 2000

Bhutan	0–8	Turkmenistan
		Bayramov 21', 31', 81'; Agabaýew 12', 25'; Aleksandr Ignatow 48'; Goçgulyýew 66'; Kulyýew 85'

Mohammed Al-Hamad Stadium, Hawally

18 February 2000

Yemen	11–2	Bhutan
Briek 4'; Al-Salimi 18', 55'; Al-Nono 15', 56', 87'; Tahous 24', 81'; Al-Ghurbani 25', 26'; Al-Kahta 82'		Ogissen 42'; Won Dei 45'

Mohammed Al-Hamad Stadium, Hawally
18 February 2000

Kuwait	5–0	Nepal
Abdullah 9', 24', 45', 66', 90' (pen.)

Mohammed Al-Hamad Stadium, Hawally

== Group 6 ==
Matches were played at the Dongdaemun Stadium in Seoul, South Korea. South Korea qualified for the 2000 AFC Asian Cup.

=== Table ===
Pos	Team	Pld	W	D	L	GF	GA	GD	Pts	Qualification
1	South Korea	3	3	0	0	19	0	+19	9	Qualification for the 2000 AFC Asian Cup
2	Myanmar	3	2	0	1	6	4	+2	6	
3	Laos	3	1	0	2	2	14	−12	3	
4	Mongolia	3	0	0	3	1	10	−9	0	

=== Matches ===
5 April 2000

Myanmar	2–0	Mongolia
Soe Myat Min 74'; Myo Hlaing Win 86'

Dongdaemun Stadium, Seoul
5 April 2000

South Korea	9–0	Laos
Sim Jae-won 32'; Kim Eun-jung 45', 67', 71'; Lee Chun-soo 50'; Seol Ki-hyeon 58', 77', 86'; Ahn Hyo-yeon 75'

Dongdaemun Stadium, Seoul
Attendance: 16,500
Referee: Hisaharu Kitamura (Japan)

7 April 2000

Myanmar	4–0	Laos
Myo Hlaing Win 32', 62'; Aung Kyaw Moe 43'; Than Toe Aung 51'

Dongdaemun Stadium, Seoul
7 April 2000

South Korea	6–0	Mongolia
Ahn Hyo-yeon 21', 24'; Choi Tae-uk 37' (pen.), 89'; Choi Chul-woo 46'; Lee Chun-soo 71'

Dongdaemun Stadium, Seoul
Attendance: 2,150
Referee: Sung Ho Liu (Chinese Taipei)

9 April 2000

Laos	2–1	Mongolia
Khenkitisack 26'; Homsombath 80'		Buman-Uchral 63'

Dongdaemun Stadium, Seoul
9 April 2000

South Korea	4–0	Myanmar
Seol Ki-hyeon 61', 67'; Ahn Hyo-yeon 78', 89'

Dongdaemun Stadium, Seoul
Attendance: 15,600
Referee: Hisaharu Kitamura (Japan)

== Group 7 ==
Matches were played on a home-and-away basis. Indonesia qualified for the 2000 AFC Asian Cup.

=== Table ===
Pos	Team	Pld	W	D	L	GF	GA	GD	Pts	Qualification
1	Indonesia	4	3	1	0	18	5	+13	10	Qualification for the 2000 AFC Asian Cup
2	Hong Kong	4	2	1	1	7	5	+2	7	
3	Cambodia	4	0	0	4	4	19	−15	0	

=== Matches ===
18 October 1999

Hong Kong	4–1	Cambodia
Chen Sin Syu-Chung 34', 52'; Lee Kin Wo 54'; Wong Chi Kyung 83'		Sochetra 40'

Mongkok Stadium, Hong Kong
Attendance: 5,461

24 October 1999

Hong Kong	1–1	Indonesia
Au Wai Lun 62'		Putiray 88'

Mongkok Stadium, Hong Kong

30 October 1999

Cambodia	1–5	Indonesia
Arunreath 72'		Prasetyo 14'; Pamungkas 28'; Putiray 39', 46'; Sunan 47'

Olympic Stadium, Phnom Penh

7 November 1999

Cambodia	0–1	Hong Kong
		Lai Kai Cheuk 58'

Olympic Stadium, Phnom Penh

14 November 1999

Indonesia	3–1	Hong Kong
Ma'ruf 9'; Putiray 48'; Pamungkas 72'		Au Wai Lun 62'

Senayan Stadium, Jakarta

20 November 1999

Indonesia	9–2	Cambodia
Putiray 2', 38', 90'; Purjianto 15'; Nahumarury 33'; Nawawi 40'; Pamungkas 53', 70'; Putro 85'		Sochetra 13', 58'

Senayan Stadium, Jakarta

== Group 8 ==
Matches were played at the Shah Alam Stadium in Shah Alam, Malaysia and the Suphachalasai Stadium in Bangkok, Thailand. Indonesia qualified for the 2000 AFC Asian Cup.

=== Table ===
Pos	Team	Pld	W	D	L	GF	GA	GD	Pts	Qualification
1	Thailand	6	4	1	1	13	8	+5	13	Qualification for the 2000 AFC Asian Cup
2	North Korea	6	3	2	1	11	7	+4	11	
3	Malaysia	6	2	1	3	12	13	−1	7	
4	Chinese Taipei	6	1	0	5	3	11	−8	3	

=== Matches ===
25 March 2000
18:45

North Korea	0–0	Thailand

Shah Alam Stadium, Shah Alam
Attendance: 15,150
Referee: Yam-Ming Chan (Hong Kong)
25 March 2000
20:45

Malaysia	3–0	Chinese Taipei
Derus 34'; Suparman 82', 86'

Shah Alam Stadium, Shah Alam

27 March 2000
18:45

Chinese Taipei	0–2	Thailand
		Piturat 74'; Cheng Yung-Jen 81' (o.g.)

Shah Alam Stadium, Shah Alam
27 March 2000
20:45

Malaysia	1–1	North Korea
Yusoff 58'		Ko Jong-Nam 6'

Shah Alam Stadium, Shah Alam
Attendance: 18,000
Referee: Naotsugu Fuse (Japan)

29 March 2000
18:45

Chinese Taipei	0–2	North Korea
		Ryang Gyu-Sa 12', 21'

Shah Alam Stadium, Shah Alam
Attendance: 4,000
Referee: Jerry Andre (Philippines)
29 March 2000
20:45

Malaysia	3–2	Thailand
Suparman 14'; Derus 21' (pen.); Jusoh 48'		Fuangprakob 55'; Surasiang 90'

Shah Alam Stadium, Shah Alam

4 April 2000

Chinese Taipei	3–2	Malaysia
R.C 14'; Ming Tuan 29', 34'		Derus 21', 90+13'

Suphachalasai Stadium, Bangkok
4 April 2000
18:30

Thailand	5–3	North Korea
Damrong-Ontrakul 34'; Surasiang 35'; Piturat 73'; Noosarung 86'; Thonkanya 88'		Ju Song-Il 28'; Kim Ho-Gun 53'; Ko Jong-Nam 60'

Suphachalasai Stadium, Bangkok

6 April 2000
16:30

North Korea	4–1	Malaysia
Ri Kyong-Min 16'; Ryang Gyu-Sa 49'; Ri Hyok-Choi 73', 84'		Ooi Hoe Guan 26'

Suphachalasai Stadium, Bangkok
Attendance: 20,000
6 April 2000

Thailand	1–0	Chinese Taipei
Damrong-Ontrakul 43'

Suphachalasai Stadium, Bangkok

9 April 2000
16:30

North Korea	1–0	Chinese Taipei
Ri Hyok-Choi 53'

Suphachalasai Stadium, Bangkok
Attendance: 45,000
9 April 2000

Thailand	3–2	Malaysia
Noosarung 14'; Baribarn 24' (pen.), 67'		Suparman 35'; Yusoff 60'

Suphachalasai Stadium, Bangkok

== Group 9 ==
Matches were played at the Thống Nhất Stadium in Ho Chi Minh City, Vietnam. China broke the record for the largest margin of victory in an international football match after their 19–0 win against Guam. This was beaten by Kuwait a few weeks later. China qualified for the 2000 AFC Asian Cup.

=== Table ===
Pos	Team	Pld	W	D	L	GF	GA	GD	Pts	Qualification
1	China	3	3	0	0	29	0	+29	9	Qualification for the 2000 AFC Asian Cup
2	Vietnam	3	2	0	1	14	2	+12	6	
3	Philippines	3	1	0	2	2	11	−9	3	
4	Guam	3	0	0	3	0	32	−32	0	

=== Matches ===
23 January 2000

Vietnam	11–0	Guam
Phạm Như Thuần 1'; Vũ Công Tuyền 2', 12', 13', 19', 90+3'; Văn Sỹ Hùng 39', 81'; Võ Minh Hiếu 45'; Đặng Phương Nam 59'; Ngô Quang Trường 75'

Thống Nhất Stadium, Ho Chi Minh City
23 January 2000

China	8–0	Philippines
Su Maozhen 3', 12', 19', 35', 45'; Hao Haidong 26'; Yao Xia 41'; Li Tie 80'

Thống Nhất Stadium, Ho Chi Minh City
Referee: Duraman Zulkifle (Brunei)

26 January 2000

China	19–0	Guam
Hao Haidong 2', 56', 58', 63'; Ma Mingyu 12'; Su Maozhen 20', 40', 80'; Li Weifeng 23'; Yao Xia 38', 55'; Qu Shengqing 55', 61', 73', 83', 87'; Li Tie 75'; Shen Si 84'; Qi Hong 85'

Thống Nhất Stadium, Ho Chi Minh City
Referee: U Tun Tun (Myanmar)
26 January 2000

Vietnam	3–0	Philippines
Vũ Công Tuyền 21'; Ngô Quang Trường 72', 88'

Thống Nhất Stadium, Ho Chi Minh City

29 January 2000

Guam	0–2	Philippines
		N. Fegidero 63'; T. Fegidero 86'

Thống Nhất Stadium, Ho Chi Minh City
29 January 2000

Vietnam	0–2	China
		Su Maozhen 27'; Zhang Enhua 89'

Thống Nhất Stadium, Ho Chi Minh City
Attendance: 16,000

== Group 10 ==
Matches were played at the Centro Desportivo Olímpico - Estádio in Macau. Japan qualified for the 2000 AFC Asian Cup.

=== Table ===
Pos	Team	Pld	W	D	L	GF	GA	GD	Pts	Qualification
1	Japan	3	3	0	0	15	0	+15	9	Qualification for the 2000 AFC Asian Cup
2	Singapore	3	2	0	1	2	3	−1	6	
3	Macau	3	1	0	2	1	4	−3	3	
4	Brunei	3	0	0	3	0	11	−11	0	

=== Matches ===
13 February 2000

Macau	1–0	Brunei
Fi Fai 77'

Centro Desportivo Olímpico - Estádio, Macau
13 February 2000

Singapore	0–3	Japan
		Nakazawa 13', 90'; Nakayama 42' (pen.)

Centro Desportivo Olímpico - Estádio, Macau
Attendance: 1,000
Referee: Kim Hoe Sung (South Korea)

16 February 2000

Macau	0–1	Singapore
		Zulkarnaen 12' (pen.)

Centro Desportivo Olímpico - Estádio, Macau
16 February 2000

Japan	9–0	Brunei
Nakayama 1', 2', 4'; Kazu 36'; Nakamura 45'; Hirano 66'; Takahara 75', 88'; Sawanobori 85'

Centro Desportivo Olímpico - Estádio, Macau

20 February 2000

Macau	0–3	Japan
		Nakayama 35', 65'; Takahara 57'

Centro Desportivo Olímpico - Estádio, Macau
20 February 2000

Singapore	1–0	Brunei
Mohd Ali 88'

Centro Desportivo Olímpico - Estádio, Macau

== Qualified teams ==
Country	Qualified as	Date qualification was secured	Previous appearances in tournament
Lebanon	Hosts	20 December 1996	0 (Debut)
Saudi Arabia	1996 AFC Asian Cup winners	21 December 1996	4 (1984, 1988, 1992, 1996)
Iraq	Qualifying round Group 1 winners	7 August 1999	3 (1972, 1976, 1996)
Indonesia	Qualifying round Group 7 winners	20 November 1999	1 (1996)
Uzbekistan	Qualifying round Group 3 winners	26 November 1999	1 (1996)
China	Qualifying round Group 9 winners	29 January 2000	6 (1976, 1980, 1984, 1988, 1992, 1996)
Kuwait	Qualifying round Group 5 winners	18 February 2000	6 (1972, 1976, 1980, 1984, 1988, 1996)
Japan	Qualifying round Group 10 winners	20 February 2000	3 (1988, 1992, 1996)
Qatar	Qualifying round Group 4 winners	8 April 2000	4 (1980, 1984, 1988, 1992)
South Korea	Qualifying round Group 6 winners	9 April 2000	8 (1956, 1960, 1964, 1972, 1980, 1984, 1988, 1996)
Thailand	Qualifying round Group 8 winners	9 April 2000	3 (1972, 1992, 1996)
Iran	Qualifying round Group 2 winners	11 April 2000	8 (1968, 1972, 1976, 1980, 1984, 1988, 1992, 1996)
