= 2006 King's Cup =

Tournament details
- Host country: Thailand
- Dates: 24–30 December
- Teams: 4 (from 2 confederations)
- Venue(s): 1 (in 1 host city)

Final positions
- Champions: Thailand (12th title)
- Runners-up: Vietnam
- Third place: Kazakhstan
- Fourth place: Singapore

Tournament statistics
- Matches played: 7
- Goals scored: 21 (3 per match)
- Top scorer(s): (Vietnam) Phan Thanh Binh (3 goals)

The 2006 King's Cup finals were held from 24 to 30 December 2006 at the Suphachalasai Stadium in Bangkok, Thailand. The King's Cup (คิงส์คัพ) is an annual football tournament; the first tournament was played in 1968.

Hosts Thailand won the tournament beating Vietnam 3–1 in the final. Kazakhstan and Singapore were the other teams to play in this tournament.

== Venue ==
Bangkok
Suphachalasai Stadium
Capacity: 19,793
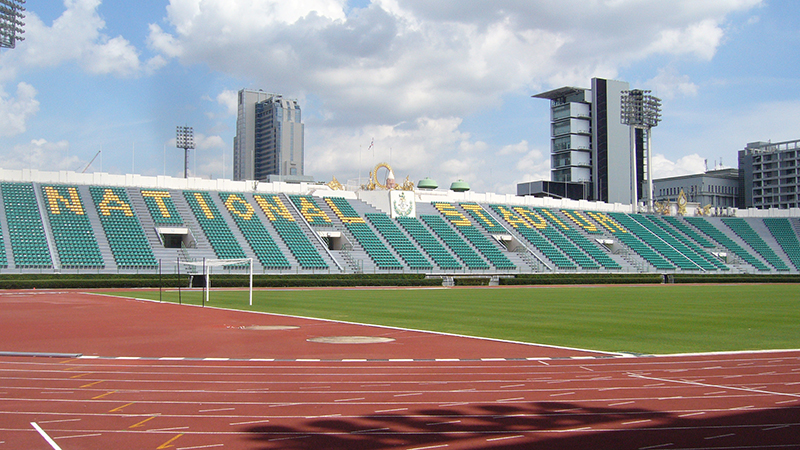

== Matches ==
=== Round robin tournament ===
Team	Pld	W	D	L	GF	GA	GD	Pts
Thailand	3	2	1	0	6	3	+3	7
Vietnam	3	2	0	1	6	5	+1	6
Kazakhstan	3	0	2	1	3	4	−1	2
Singapore	3	0	1	2	2	5	−3	1

Source: RSSSF
24 December 2006
17:00 UTC+7

Kazakhstan	0–0	Singapore

Suphachalasai Stadium, Bangkok

24 December 2006
19:15 UTC+7

Thailand	2–1	Vietnam
Chaikamdee 36'; Thonglao 61'		Phan Thanh Binh 35'

Suphachalasai Stadium, Bangkok

26 December 2006
16:30 UTC+7

Vietnam	2–1	Kazakhstan
Le Hong Minh 21'; Le Cong Vinh 90'		Finonchenko 57'

Suphachalasai Stadium, Bangkok

26 December 2006
18:45 UTC+7

Thailand	2–0	Singapore
Senamuang 58', 63'

Suphachalasai Stadium, Bangkok

28 December 2006
16:30 UTC+7

Singapore	2–3	Vietnam
Bennett 14'; Fazrul 62'		Phan Thanh Binh 7'; Le Tan Tai 53'; Le Cong Vinh 82'

Suphachalasai Stadium, Bangkok

28 December 2006
18:45 UTC+7

Thailand	2–2	Kazakhstan
Nuchnum 41'; Thonkanya 58'		Rodionov 66'; Ashirbekov 77'

Suphachalasai Stadium, Bangkok

=== Final ===
30 December 2006
18:00 UTC+7

Thailand	3–1	Vietnam
Suksomkit 38'; Thonkanya 41'; Nuchnum 58'		Phan Thanh Binh 68'

Suphachalasai Stadium, Bangkok

== Winner ==
2006 King's Cup champion

Thailand
12th title

== Scorers ==
3 goals:

- (Vietnam) Phan Thanh Binh

2 goals:

- (Thailand) Kiatisuk Senamuang
- (Thailand) Pipat Thonkanya
- (Thailand) Suchao Nuchnum
- (Vietnam) Le Cong Vinh

1 goal:

- (Kazakhstan) Murat Suyumagambetov
- (Kazakhstan) Denis Rodionov
- (Kazakhstan) Kairat Ashirbekov
- (Singapore) Daniel Bennett
- (Singapore) Fazrul Nawaz
- (Thailand) Sarayuth Chaikamdee
- (Thailand) Datsakorn Thonglao
- (Thailand) Sutee Suksomkit
- (Vietnam) Le Hong Minh
- (Vietnam) Le Tan Tai
