= 2000 King's Cup =

Tournament details
- Host country: Thailand
- Dates: 20–27 February
- Teams: 4 (from 1 confederation)
- Venue: 1 (in 1 host city)

Final positions
- Champions: Thailand (11th title)
- Runners-up: Finland
- Third place: Brazil
- Fourth place: Estonia

Tournament statistics
- Matches played: 8
- Goals scored: 26 (3.25 per match)

The 31st King's Cup finals were held from 20 to 27 February 2000 at the Rajamangala Stadium in Bangkok, Thailand. The King's Cup (คิงส์คัพ) is an annual football tournament; the first tournament was played in 1968.

Hosts Thailand won the tournament beating Finland 5–1 in the final. The surprising match results are due to Brazil actually having two teams in the tournament; U-17 team (called U-20 in Brazilian records) that played against Finland and Estonia, while the A-team faced Thailand.

== Venue ==
Bangkok
Rajamangala Stadium
Capacity: 49,772
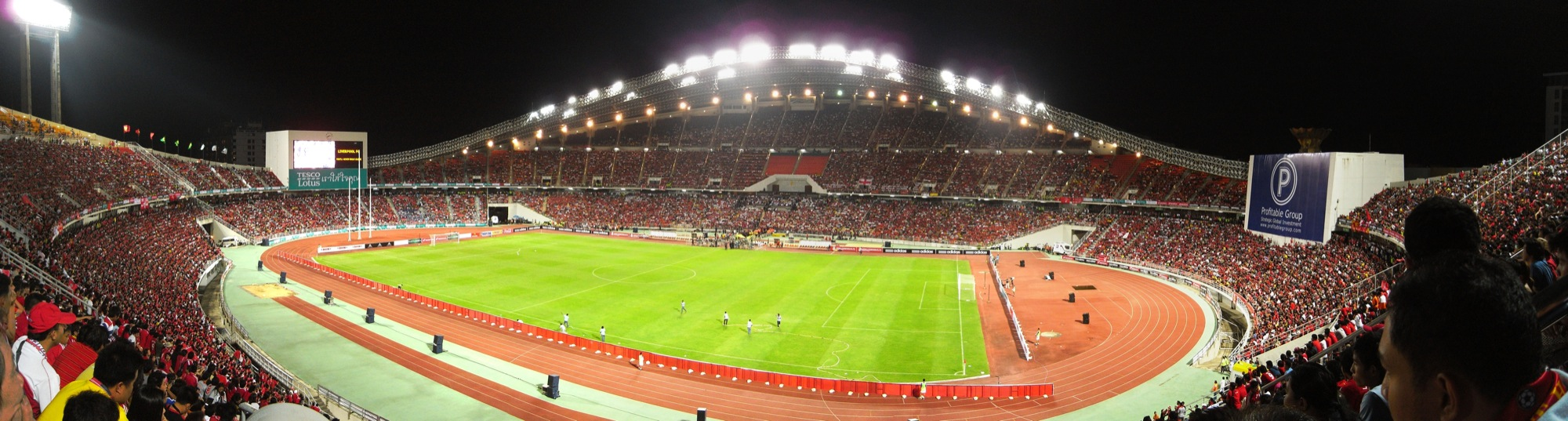

== Tournament ==
Team	Pld	W	D	L	GF	GA	GD	Pts
Finland	3	2	1	0	7	2	+5	7
Thailand	3	1	1	1	2	8	−6	4
Brazil	3	1	0	2	7	4	+3	3
Estonia	3	1	0	2	4	6	−2	3

Source: RSSSF

=== Matches ===
20 February 2000
19:10 (UTC+07:00)

Thailand	0–0	Finland

Rajamangala Stadium, Bangkok
20 February 2000
19:10 (UTC+07:00)

Estonia	1–0	Brazil

Rajamangala Stadium, Bangkok

23 February 2000
19:10 (UTC+07:00)

Thailand	0–7	Brazil
		Rivaldo 25', 40'; Ronaldinho 44'; Émerson 49', 85'; Roque Júnior 73'; Jardel 80'

Rajamangala Stadium, Bangkok

23 February 2000
21:15 (UTC+07:00)

Finland	4–2	Estonia
Kottila 12', 56'; Tuomela 14'; Kuqi 60'		Zelinski 71' (pen.); Oper 84'

Rajamangala Stadium, Bangkok

25 February 2000
19:10 (UTC+07:00)

Thailand	2–1	Estonia
Pipat 22', 34'		Reim 65' (pen.)

Rajamangala Stadium, Bangkok

25 February 2000
21:15 (UTC+07:00)

Finland	3–0	Brazil

Rajamangala Stadium, Bangkok

=== Place Match ===
27 February 2000

Brazil	1–0	Estonia
Matheus Vivian 36'

Rajamangala Stadium, Bangkok

=== Final ===
27 February 2000

Thailand	5–1	Finland
Anurak 22', 44', 81'; Pipat 25'; Thanunchai 56'		Kallio 73'

Rajamangala Stadium, Bangkok
Attendance: 15,000

== Winner ==
2000 King's Cup champion

Thailand
11th title
