= Nguyễn Văn Biển =

Vietnamese footballer

Personal information
- Full name: Nguyễn Văn Biển
- Date of birth: April 27, 1985 (age 41)
- Place of birth: Nam Trực, Nam Định, Vietnam
- Height: 1.73 m (5 ft 8 in)
- Positions: Centre-back; right-back

Youth career
- 1998–2004: Nam Định

Senior career*
Years	Team	Apps	(Gls)
2005–2011	Nam Định	64	(0)
2011–2017	Hà Nội	108	(1)

International career^{‡}
2007–2008	Vietnam U23	12	(1)
2006–2015	Vietnam	27	(2)
- * Club domestic league appearances and goals ‡ National team caps and goals as of 3 March 2019

Nguyễn Văn Biển (born 27 April 1985 in Nam Định) is a retired Vietnamese footballer who played as a centre back or right back for V.League club Hà Nội F.C. and the Vietnamese national team.

== International career ==
=== International goals ===
#	Date	Venue	Opponent	Score	Result	Competition
1.	17 January 2007	Kallang, Singapore	Laos	4–0	9–0	2007 AFF Championship
2.	17 January 2007	Kallang, Singapore	Laos	9–0	9–0	2007 AFF Championship

== Honours ==
=== Club ===
Hà Nội F.C.

- V.League 1: 2013, 2016; runners-up: 2011, 2012, 2014, 2015; third place: 2017
- Vietnamese Super Cup runners-up: 2013, 2015, 2016
- Vietnamese National Cup runners-up: 2012, 2015, 2016
- AFC Cup quarter-finals: 2014
