= Nizaruddin Yusof =

Malaysian footballer

Personal information
- Full name: Mohd Nizaruddin Yusof
- Date of birth: 10 November 1979 (age 47)
- Place of birth: Sentul, Kuala Lumpur, Malaysia
- Height: 1.75 m (5 ft 9 in)
- Position: Striker

Youth career
- 1997–1998: Kuala Lumpur

Senior career*
Years	Team	Apps	(Gls)
1999–2000	Kuala Lumpur		(8)
2000–2003	Selangor		(9)
2004	MPPJ		(4)
2005	Public Bank		(5)
2005–2006	Negeri Sembilan		(0)
2006–2007	UPB-MyTeam		(3)
2007–2008	Perlis		(9)
2008	→PDRM (Loan)		(1)
2009	Perlis		(18)
2010	KL PLUS		(3)
2011	Felda United	22	(3)
2012	PKNS		(2)
2013	ATM		(0)
2014	MOF		
2015	Penjara		

International career^{‡}
1999–2008	Malaysia	51	(10)
Medal record
Malaysia under-23
Sea Games
Silver medal – second place	Sea Games 2001	Football
- * Club domestic league appearances and goals as of 15 August 2014 ‡ National team caps and goals as of 15 August 2014

Mohd Nizaruddin Yusof (born 10 November 1979) is a former Malaysian footballer who operates as a striker. He last played for Penjara FC in the Malaysia FAM League. He played for Malaysian national team and also has played for the Malaysia Under-23 in 2001 Southeast Asian Games.He is well known for his finishing ability.

He became an instant hit with the local fans (Selangor and MPPJ) and also the envy of other clubs in the M-League. In November 2007, he signed for Perlis. He did not play when Perlis won the Malaysia Charity Shield. He moved to PDRM in 2008 on a season long deal. After his contract with PDRM ended, he returned to Perlis in 2009. With Perlis, he won the 2009 Malaysia Super League Golden Boot award scoring 18 goals and becoming runners up with the team at the end of the 2009 season.

After a year with Perlis, Nizaruddin also played with KL PLUS and Felda United before joining PKNS in April 2012, on a free transfer. In April 2013, Nizaruddin joined ATM.

Nizaruddin started representing Malaysia during 1999 Dubai Tour, 2000 Merdeka Tournament and 2000 AFF Championship under Abdul Rahman Ibrahim. Since then he was selected to be part of the Malaysia squad, making him one of the more experienced players on the Malaysian national team. Although he did not produce many goals with the national team, he was adept at producing assists for his teammates to score.

He also a sports commentator for Malaysia television Astro Arena.

== International goals ==
#	Date	Venue	Opponent	Score	Result	Competition
1.	28 December 1999	Dubai, UAE	Singapore	1–0	Won	Friendly
2.	7 February 2000	Singapore	Singapore	3–1	Lost	Friendly
3.	15 February 2000	Kuala Lumpur, Malaysia	Maldives	2–0	Won	Friendly
4.	27 March 2000	Shah Alam, Malaysia	North Korea	1–1	Draw	2000 AFC Asian Cup qualification
5.	8 April 2000	Bangkok, Thailand	Thailand	3–2	Lost	2000 AFC Asian Cup qualification
6.	6 August 2000	Shah Alam, Malaysia	Myanmar	6–0	Won	Friendly
7.	6 August 2000	Shah Alam, Malaysia	Myanmar	6–0	Won	Friendly
8.	18 December 2002	Singapore, Singapore	Singapore	0–4	Won	2002 Tiger Cup
9.	12 January 2007	Bangkok, Thailand	Philippines	4–0	Won	2007 AFF Championship
10.	20 October 2008	Kuala Lumpur, Malaysia	Afghanistan	6–0	Won	2008 Pestabola Merdeka

== Honours ==
Kuala Lumpur

- President Cup: 1998
- Malaysia FA Cup: 1999
- Malaysia Charity Shield: 2000

Selangor

- Malaysia FA Cup: 2001
- Malaysia Cup: 2002
- Malaysia Charity Shield: 2002

MPPJ

- Malaysia Premier League: 2004
- Malaysia Charity Shield: 2004

Negeri Sembilan

- Malaysia Super League: 2005–06

Perlis

- Malaysia Super League: 2009 runner up

Malaysia U-23

- SEA Games: (silver) Silver 2001

Malaysia

- AFF Championship: 2000 third place
- Pestabola Merdeka: 2008 runner up

=== Individual ===
- Malaysia Super League Golden Boot: 2009 (18 goals)
