= Yanal Abaza =

Syrian footballer (born 1976)

Yanal Abaza ينال أباظة
Personal information
- Full name: Yanal Abaza
- Date of birth: 1 May 1976 (age 50)
- Place of birth: Al-Quneitra, Syria
- Position: Defender

Youth career
- –: Al-Wahda

Senior career*
| Years | Team | Apps | (Gls) |
| 1999–2000 | Al-Wahda | – | (–) |
| 2000–2002 | Al-Wahdat | – | (–) |
| 2002–2005 | Al-Wahda | – | (–) |
| 2007–2008 | Al-Nidhal | – | (–) |
| 2008–2010 | Al-Wahda | – | (–) |

International career
| 2000–2002 | Syria | 12 | (0) |
- * Club domestic league appearances and goals

Yanal Abaza (Arabic: ينال أباظة) (born 1 May 1976) is a retired Syrian footballer who played as a defender.

He represented the Syria national team between 2000 and 2002, earning 12 caps. He made four appearances in the 2002 West Asian Championship that was hosted in Syria. As well as having three separate spells with Syrian Premier League club Al-Wahda, Abaza played in the Jordan League for Al-Wahdat and the Syrian First Division for Al-Nidhal. Yanal is an ethnic Circassian. He retired in August 2010.
