= Sarayuth Chaikamdee =

Thai footballer

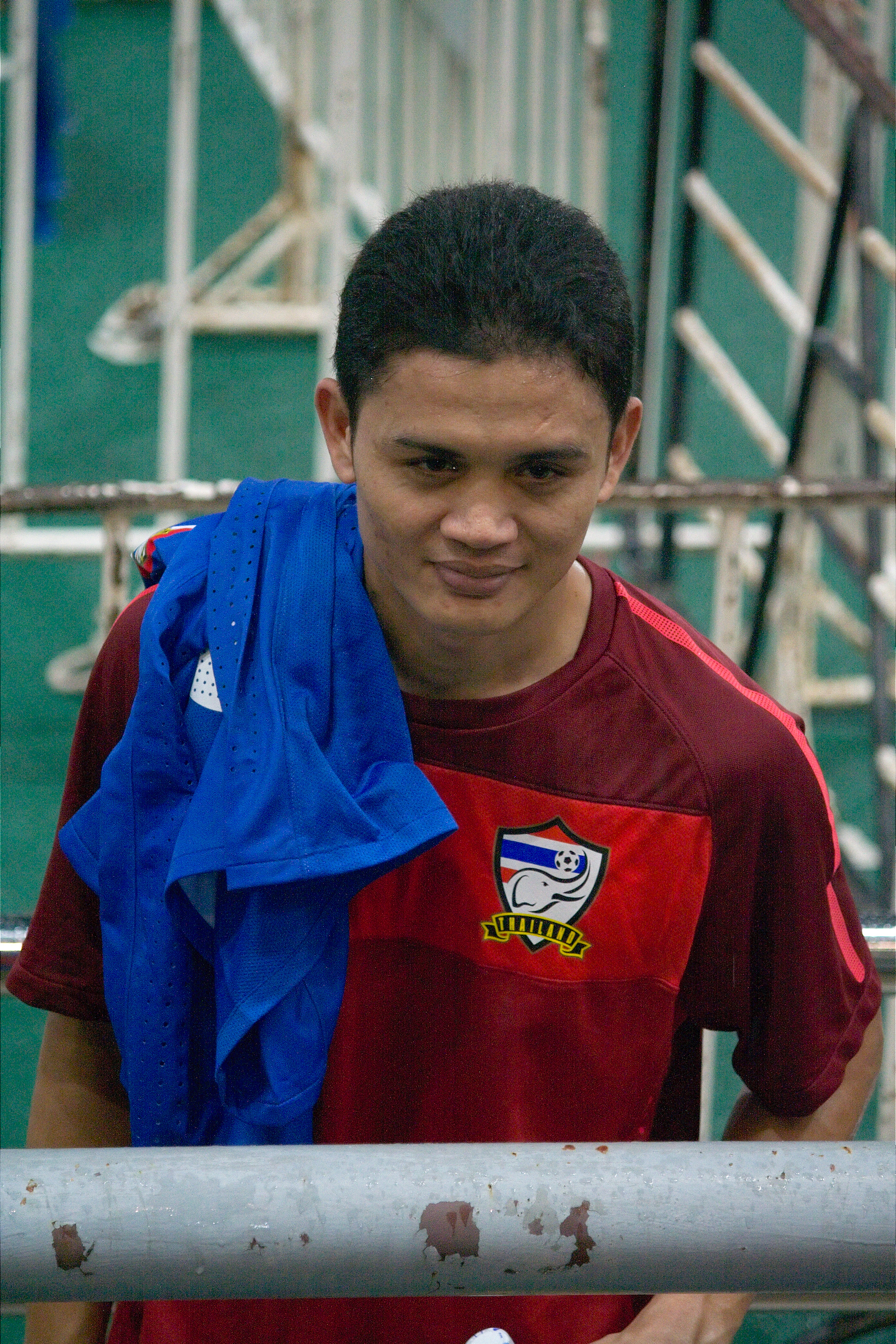
- Chaikamdee with Thailand in September 2011

Personal information
- Full name: Sarayuth Chaikamdee
- Date of birth: 24 September 1981 (age 45)
- Place of birth: Khon Kaen, Thailand
- Height: 1.74 m (5 ft 8 1/2 in)
- Position: Striker

Youth career
- 1993–1995: Nonsaard Witayakan School
- 1996–1998: Phon Technical College
- 1999–2000: Royal Thai Airforce

Senior career*
Years	Team	Apps	(Gls)
2001–2004	Thai Port	66	(47)
2005–2006	Pisico Bình Định	29	(20)
2007	Thai Port	20	(11)
2008–2009	Osotspa Saraburi	47	(21)
2010	Thai Port	26	(13)
2011	Bangkok Glass	24	(15)
2012	Army United	12	(2)
2012	Bangkok	16	(3)
2013	BEC Tero Sasana	1	(0)
2013	→ Samutsongkhram (loan)	5	(0)
2014	Sisaket	32	(9)
2015–2016	Air Force Central	14	(3)
2016	Khon Kaen United	19	(5)
2017	Chainat Hornbill	6	(0)
Total		317	(149)

International career
2003	Thailand U23	5	(9)
2003–2011	Thailand	49	(31)

Managerial career
- 2018–2019: Khon Kaen United
- 2020: Bankhai United
- 2020: Sisaket
- 2022: Samut Sakhon City
- 2023: Samut Sakhon City
- * Club domestic league appearances and goals

Sarayuth Chaikamdee (Thai: ศรายุทธ ชัยคำดี; born 24 September 1981), simply known as Joe (Thai: โจ้), is a Thai retired professional footballer. He is a striker and is known in Thailand as "Joe five yards (Thai: โจ้ 5 หลา)" because he mainly score goals within the 5 yards box.

== Club career ==
He was voted the 2010 Thai League Cup player of the tournament despite missing out on the final due to suspension. His side, Thai Port defeated Buriram PEA 2–1 in the final.

== International career ==
He scored the winning goal for Thailand, to send them through to the 3rd round of the Asian Qualifying zone, in their victory of Yemen (2–1 aggregate) for the World Cup Qualifying in South Africa 2010.

== International matches ==
Thailand national football team
Year	Apps	Goals
2003	8	5
2004	14	7
2005	0	0
2006	4	1
2007	12	12
2008	5	2
2009	0	0
2010	5	4
2011	1	0
Total	49	31

== International goals ==
#	Date	Venue	Opponent	Score	Result	Competition
1.	16 February 2003	Bangkok, Thailand	North Korea	2–2	Draw	2003 King's Cup
2.	16 October 2003	Bangkok, Thailand	India	2–0	Won	Friendly
3.	17 November 2003	Bangkok, Thailand	Hong Kong	4–0	Won	2004 AFC Asian Cup qualifier
4.	17 November 2003	Bangkok, Thailand	Hong Kong	4–0	Won	2004 AFC Asian Cup qualifier
5.	21 November 2003	Bangkok, Thailand	Uzbekistan	4–1	Won	2004 AFC Asian Cup qualifier
6.	31 March 2004	Sanaa, Yemen	Yemen	3–0	Won	2004 FIFA World Cup qualifier
7.	12 December 2004	Kuala Lumpur, Malaysia	Timor-Leste	8–0	Won	2004 Tiger Cup
8.	12 December 2004	Kuala Lumpur, Malaysia	Timor-Leste	8–0	Won	2004 Tiger Cup
9.	12 December 2004	Kuala Lumpur, Malaysia	Timor-Leste	8–0	Won	2004 Tiger Cup
10.	14 December 2004	Kuala Lumpur, Malaysia	Malaysia	1–2	Lost	2004 Tiger Cup
11.	16 December 2004	Kuala Lumpur, Malaysia	Philippines	3–1	Won	2004 Tiger Cup
12.	21 December 2004	Bangkok, Thailand	Germany	1–5	Lost	Friendly
13.	24 December 2006	Bangkok, Thailand	Vietnam	2–1	Won	2006 King's Cup
14.	14 January 2007	Bangkok, Thailand	Philippines	4–0	Won	2007 ASEAN Football Championship
15.	14 January 2007	Bangkok, Thailand	Philippines	4–0	Won	2007 ASEAN Football Championship
16.	16 January 2007	Bangkok, Thailand	Malaysia	1–0	Won	2007 Asean Football Championship
17.	8 October 2007	Bangkok, Thailand	Macau	6–1	Won	2010 FIFA World Cup qualifier
18.	8 October 2007	Bangkok, Thailand	Macau	6–1	Won	2010 FIFA World Cup qualifier
19.	15 October 2007	Taipa, Macau	Macau	7–1	Won	2010 FIFA World Cup qualifier
20.	15 October 2007	Taipa, Macau	Macau	7–1	Won	2010 FIFA World Cup qualifier
21.	15 October 2007	Taipa, Macau	Macau	7–1	Won	2010 FIFA World Cup qualifier
22.	9 November 2007	Sanaa, Yemen	Yemen	1–1	Draw	2010 FIFA World Cup qualifier
23.	18 November 2007	Bangkok, Thailand	Yemen	1–0	Won	2010 FIFA World Cup qualifier
24.	22 December 2007	Bangkok, Thailand	Uzbekistan	3–2	Won	2007 King's Cup
25.	22 December 2007	Bangkok, Thailand	Uzbekistan	3–2	Won	2007 King's Cup
26.	20 May 2008	Bangkok, Thailand	Nepal	7–0	Won	Friendly
27.	2 June 2008	Bangkok, Thailand	Bahrain	2–3	Lost	2010 FIFA World Cup qualifier
28.	11 August 2010	Nonthaburi, Thailand	Singapore	1–0	Win	Friendly
29.	4 September 2010	Nonthaburi, Thailand	India	1–0	Win	Friendly
30.	1 December 2010	Jakarta, Indonesia	Laos	2–2	Draw	2010 AFF Suzuki Cup
31.	1 December 2010	Jakarta, Indonesia	Laos	2–2	Draw	2010 AFF Suzuki Cup
Correct as of 6 March 2012.

== Honours ==
=== Club ===
Thai Port

- Thai League Cup (1): 2010

=== International ===
Thailand

- King's Cup (2): 2006, 2007

Thailand U-23

- Sea Games Gold Medal (1); 2003

=== Individual ===
- Thai Premier League Top Scorer (2): 2002-2003, 2004–05
- Thai Premier League Player of the Month (1): June 2010
