= 2007 AFF Championship =

ASEAN Football Championship 2006
2006 Kejohanan Bola Sepak ASEAN 2006 東盟足球錦標賽 2006 ஏசியான் கால்ப கோப்பை 2006 อาเซียนฟุตบอลแชมเปียนชิพ

Tournament details
- Host country: Singapore; Thailand (for group stage)
- Dates: 12 January – 4 February 2007
- Teams: 8
- Venues: 4 (in 3 host cities)

Final positions
- Champions: Singapore (3rd title)
- Runners-up: Thailand

Tournament statistics
- Matches played: 18
- Goals scored: 50 (2.78 per match)
- Top scorer(s): (Singapore) Noh Alam Shah (10 goals)
- Best player: (Singapore) Noh Alam Shah

The 2006 AFF Championship (officially designated as the ASEAN Football Championship 2007) was the 6th edition of the AFF Championship, the football championship of Southeast Asia. The group stage was co-hosted by Singapore and Thailand from 12 to 17 January. Knockout stage with two-leg Home-and-away format was hosted from 23 January to 4 February 2007.

It was renamed from the Tiger Cup, due to the cup's main sponsor, Tiger Beer, not continuing their title sponsorship. This was the last event held at Singapore's National Stadium before its redevelopment.

Singapore set an AFF Cup record of a 15-match unbeaten run under coach Radojko Avramović, stretching back to the 2004 AFF Championship, and 17-match unbeaten run since the 4–0 defeat at home to neighbours Malaysia in the same competition on 18 December 2002.

== Hosts ==
Group stage was co-hosted Thailand and Singapore from 12 to 17 January 2007. The two hosts are the only two teams that have won the championship since its inception in 1996. Both nations with Malaysia and Vietnam were qualified from group stage and would host the knockout stage with Home-and-away format from 23 to 28 January 2007.

== Qualification ==
The qualifying round for the lower ranked teams in Southeast Asia was held in Bacolod, Philippines from 12 to 20 November 2006. It was played in a single round-robin format with the top two teams advancing to the finals. This was the first time since 1998 where a qualification tournament was held.

Six teams as qualified directly to the finals.

- Indonesia
- Malaysia
- Myanmar
- Singapore
- Thailand
- Vietnam

Two teams qualified via the qualification tournament.

- Laos (Qualification winners)
- Philippines (Qualification runner-up)

=== Qualified teams ===
The following eight teams qualified for the tournament.

Country	Previous best performance
Thailand	Winners (1996, 2000, 2002)
Singapore	Winners (1998, 2004)
Indonesia	Runners-up (2000, 2002, 2004)
Malaysia	Runners-up (1996)
Myanmar	Fourth-place (2004)
Vietnam	Runners-up (1998)
Laos	Group stage (1996, 1998, 2000, 2002, 2004)
Philippines	Group stage (1996, 1998, 2000, 2002, 2004)

== Venues ==
(Thailand) Bangkok		(Vietnam) Hanoi
Supachalasai Stadium	Thai Army Sports Stadium	Mỹ Đình National Stadium
Capacity: 40,000	Capacity: 20,000	Capacity: 40,192
Singapore		(Malaysia) Shah Alam
National Stadium	Jalan Besar Stadium	Shah Alam Stadium
Capacity: 55,000	Capacity: 6,000	Capacity: 80,372

== Group stage ==
Key to colours in group tables
Top two placed teams advanced to the semi-finals

=== Group A ===
- All matches were played in Thailand.
- Times listed are UTC+7

Team	Pld	W	D	L	GF	GA	GD	Pts
Thailand (H)	3	2	1	0	6	1	+5	7
Malaysia	3	1	1	1	4	1	+3	4
Myanmar	3	0	3	0	1	1	0	3
Philippines	3	0	1	2	0	8	−8	1

12 January 2007
16:30

Malaysia	4–0	Philippines
Hairuddin 9', 80'; Nizaruddin 16'; Del Rosario 69' (o.g.)	Report

Suphachalasai Stadium, Bangkok
Attendance: 5,000
Referee: Abbas Daud (Singapore)
12 January 2007
19:00

Thailand	1–1	Myanmar
Suchao 90+4'	Report	Si Thu Win 25'

Suphachalasai Stadium, Bangkok
Attendance: 15,000
Referee: Hajime Matsuo (Japan)

14 January 2007
16:30

Malaysia	0–0	Myanmar
	Report

Suphachalasai Stadium, Bangkok
Attendance: 28,000
Referee: Võ Minh Trí (Vietnam)
14 January 2007
19:00

Thailand	4–0	Philippines
Sarayuth 15', 28'; Pipat 21'; Natthapong 84'	Report

Suphachalasai Stadium, Bangkok
Attendance: 30,000

16 January 2007
19:00

Myanmar	0–0	Philippines
	Report

Thai Army Sports Stadium, Bangkok
Attendance: 500
Referee: Abbas Daud (Singapore)
16 January 2007
19:00

Thailand	1–0	Malaysia
Sarayuth 48'	Report

Suphachalasai Stadium, Bangkok
Attendance: 25,000
Referee: Hajime Matsuo (Japan)

=== Group B ===
- All matches were played in Singapore.
- Times listed are UTC+8

Team	Pld	W	D	L	GF	GA	GD	Pts
Singapore (H)	3	1	2	0	13	2	+11	5
Vietnam	3	1	2	0	10	1	+9	5
Indonesia	3	1	2	0	6	4	+2	5
Laos	3	0	0	3	1	23	-22	0

13 January 2007
17:30

Indonesia	3–1	Laos
Atep 51', 75'; Saktiawan 67'	Report	Sounthalay 13'

National Stadium, Kallang
13 January 2007
20:00

Singapore	0–0	Vietnam
	Report

National Stadium, Kallang
Attendance: 20,000
Referee: Chanwalit Sananwai (Thailand)

15 January 2007
17:30

Indonesia	1–1	Vietnam
Saktiawan 90'	Report	Supardi 35' (o.g.)

National Stadium, Kallang
Attendance: 4,500
Referee: Mohamed Shahbuddin (Brunei)
15 January 2007
20:00

Singapore	11–0	Laos
Ridhuan 10'; Alam Shah 11', 24', 61', 72', 76', 88', 90+2'; Shahril 47'; Khairul 71'; Dickson 78'	Report

National Stadium, Kallang
Attendance: 5,224
Referee: U Hla Tint (Myanmar)

17 January 2007
20:00

Vietnam	9–0	Laos
Lê Công Vinh 1', 28', 58'; Phan Thanh Bình 29', 73' (pen.), 81', 84'; Nguyễn Văn Biển 45', 90'	Report

Jalan Besar Stadium, Jalan Besar
Attendance: 1,005
17 January 2007
20:00

Singapore	2–2	Indonesia
Alam Shah 10' (pen.); Sahdan 52'	Report	Ilham 27'; Zaenal 56'

National Stadium, Kallang
Attendance: 13,819
Referee: Chanwalit Sananwai (Thailand)

== Knockout stage ==
Note: Although the knockout stage was two-legged, the away goals rule was not applied. If the total aggregate score of both teams after both matches remained the same, extra time would have been played, followed by a penalty shoot-out if necessary.

=== Bracket ===
Semi-finals
A1	Thailand	2	0	2
B2	Vietnam	0	0	0
B1	Singapore (a.e.t.)	1	1	2 (5)
A2	Malaysia	1	1	2 (4)

Final
A1	Thailand	1	1	2
B2	Singapore	2	1	3

=== Semi-finals ===
First legs

23 January 2007
20:00 UTC+8

Malaysia	1–1	Singapore
Hardi 57'	Report	Alam Shah 73'

Shah Alam Stadium, Shah Alam
Attendance: 40,000
Referee: Wan Daxue (China PR)
24 January 2007
19:00 UTC+7

Vietnam	0–2	Thailand
	Report	Datsakorn 28'; Pipat 81'

Mỹ Đình National Stadium, Hanoi
Attendance: 40,000
Referee: Jimmy Napitupulu (Indonesia)

Second legs

27 January 2007
20:00 UTC+8

Singapore	1–1 (a.e.t.)	Malaysia
Ridhuan 74'	Report	Eddy 57'
Penalties
Sahdan (penalty scored); Alam Shah (penalty scored); Mustafić (penalty scored); Fazrul (penalty scored); Shi J.Y. (penalty scored)	5–4	(penalty scored) Hardi; (penalty scored) Rezal; (penalty scored) Samransak; (penalty scored) Thirumurgan; (penalty missed) Khyril

National Stadium, Kallang
Attendance: 55,000
Referee: Cheung Yim Yau (Hong Kong)

2–2 on aggregate. Singapore won 5–4 on penalties.

28 January 2007
19:00 UTC+7

Thailand	0–0	Vietnam
	Report

Suphachalasai Stadium, Bangkok
Attendance: 35,000
Referee: Suresh Srinivasan (India)

Thailand won 2–0 on aggregate.

=== Final ===
After a group stage with two pools of four, the two host nations met in a two-match final. In the first leg of the final, a controversial penalty was awarded to Singapore at the 83rd minute of the match, and the Thailand team walked off the pitch as a protest to the referee's decision. The Thailand team returned to the pitch at the 98th minute, and Singapore later won 2-1.

In the second leg of the final, Singapore had a goal controversially chalked off for being offside, but finally drew 1-1 to fellow Thailand, with Khairul Amri scoring the decisive goal in the closing stages of the match, giving Singapore their 2nd title in succession, winning with an aggregate score of 3-2 and successfully defending the title. While Thailand can point to the controversial penalty for their defeat in the first leg, they failed to defeat Singapore in the second leg in Bangkok. It could have been worse for Thailand had the match officials seen Thai midfielder Datsakorn Thonglao headbutt Singapore's Khairul Amri to vent his anger after the equaliser.

First leg

31 January 2007
20:00 UTC+8

Singapore	2–1	Thailand
Alam Shah 17'; Mustafić 83' (pen.)	Report	Pipat 50'

National Stadium, Kallang
Attendance: 55,000
Referee: C. Ravichandran (Malaysia)

Second leg

4 February 2007
19:00 UTC+7

Thailand	1–1	Singapore
Pipat 37'	Report	Khairul 81'

Suphachalasai Stadium, Bangkok
Attendance: 40,000
Referee: Jimmy Napitupulu (Indonesia)

Singapore won 3–2 on aggregate.

== Awards ==
2007 AFF Championship

Singapore
Third title

Most Valuable Player	Golden Boot
(Singapore) Noh Alam Shah	(Singapore) Noh Alam Shah

== Goalscorers ==
10 goals

- (Singapore) Noh Alam Shah

4 goals

- (Thailand) Pipat Thonkanya
- (Vietnam) Phan Thanh Bình

3 goals

- (Thailand) Sarayoot Chaikamdee
- (Vietnam) Lê Công Vinh

2 goals

- (Indonesia) Atep Rizal
- (Indonesia) Saktiawan Sinaga
- (Malaysia) Hairuddin Omar
- (Singapore) Khairul Amri
- (Singapore) Muhammad Ridhuan
- (Vietnam) Nguyễn Văn Biển

1 goal

- (Indonesia) Ilham Jaya Kesuma
- (Indonesia) Zaenal Arief
- (Laos) Sounthalay Saysongkham
- (Malaysia) Mohammad Hardi Jaafar
- (Malaysia) Eddy Helmi Abdul Manan
- (Malaysia) Mohd Nizaruddin Yusof
- (Myanmar) Si Thu Win
- (Singapore) Sharil Ishak
- (Singapore) Itimi Dickson
- (Singapore) Indra Sahdan Daud
- (Singapore) Fahrudin Mustafić

Own goal

- (Indonesia) Supardi Nasir (playing against Vietnam)
- (Philippines) Anton del Rosario (playing against Malaysia)

== Team statistics ==
This table shows all team performance.

Pos	Team	Pld	W	D	L	GF	GA	GD
Final
1	Singapore	7	2	5	0	18	6	+12
2	Thailand	7	3	3	1	10	4	+6
Semi-finals
3	Vietnam	5	1	3	1	10	3	+7
4	Malaysia	5	1	3	1	6	3	+3
Eliminated in the group stage
5	Indonesia	3	1	2	0	6	4	+2
6	Myanmar	3	0	3	0	1	1	0
7	Philippines	3	0	1	2	0	8	–8
8	Laos	3	0	0	3	1	23	–22
