= Sutee Suksomkit =

Thai footballer

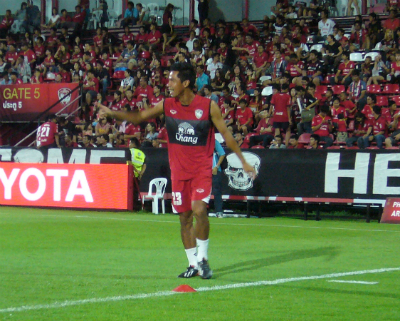

Personal information
- Full name: Sutee Suksomkit
- Date of birth: 5 June 1978 (age 48)
- Place of birth: Trat, Thailand
- Height: 1.70 m (5 ft 7 in)
- Position: Forward

Youth career
- 1994–1996: Bangkok Christian College

Senior career*
Years	Team	Apps	(Gls)
1996–2001	Thai Farmers Bank	78	(39)
2001–2002	Tanjong Pagar	56	(48)
2003–2006	Home United	96	(16)
2007–2009	Tampines Rovers	110	(30)
2009	→ Melbourne Victory (loan)	9	(0)
2010–2012	Bangkok Glass	27	(4)
2012–2014	Suphanburi	23	(4)
2015	TTM Customs	8	(1)
2015	Krabi	2	(0)
Total		409	(124)

International career
1995	Thailand U16	18	(16)
1996–1997	Thailand U17	14	(7)
2000–2012	Thailand	70	(17)

Managerial career
- 2016: Bangkok
- 2017: Lampang
- 2023: Bankhai United
- * Club domestic league appearances and goals

Sutee Suksomkit (Thai: สุธี สุขสมกิจ, born 5 June 1978) is a Thai professional football manager and former player.

He is known for his skillful style of play, Sutee, nicknamed "Bird". He spent 8 years between 2001 and 2009 playing abroad for several clubs in Singapore and Australia. He also played for Thailand at international level from 2000 to 2012, earning 70 caps.

== Club career ==
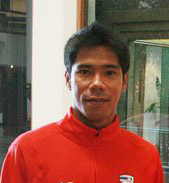
Sutee with national team in 2009

Sutee spent his youth career during 1995–1996 with an Asian powerhouse, Thai Farmers Bank. The club was recently emerged champions of AFC Champions League (Asian Club Championship) twice consecutively between 1993 and 1995. The young striker made his first senior appearance with the club in 1996 and continued playing for the club totally 5 years until 2001.

The pacey forward scored 39 goals from 78 appearances for Thai Farmers Bank.

In 2001, the promising forward joined a Singapore S-League club, Tanjong Pagar. He later adapted to play in various attacking positions including left winger, second striker and attacking midfielder. Sutee spent 2 seasons with the Singaporean side before moving to another S-League club, Home United, in 2003.

Sutee scored 30 goals from 56 appearances for Tanjong Pagar.

In 2004, a K-League side Busan I'Park expressed their interest in signing Sutee but eventually stepped off. However, regardless of his missing opportunity to join the Korean side, he was given an opportunity to take on a trial with an English Premier League club, Everton, as a part of a sponsorship deal between the Merseyside club and a Thai beer maker, Chang. The English club did not sign him afterward.

Between 2004 and 2005, an English Premier League club, Chelsea, had expressed their interest in signing the Thai forward. Chelsea eventually captured Sutee on a loan deal and sent him out to Brentford. However, Chelsea failed to apply a work permit for Sutee, caused him to return to Singapore.

With Home United, the Thai attacker did not score as many as he previously did with his former clubs, as he was placed in either wider position or drop deeper position in many occasions. However, he remained a crucial part of the team and spent fully 3 seasons with the club until 2006, made 96 appearances with 16 goals.

The versatile attacker was on the move again in early 2007, he joined Singaporean Tampines Rovers. Sutee made personal highest appearance with the Rovers, 110 appearances from 3 seasons between 2007 and 2009 and scored 30 goals.

On 25 September 2009 the 31 years old forward agreed a 3-month loan deal with A-League champions Melbourne Victory which concluded at the end of his contract with Tempines Rovers. Sutee made 9 appearances with the A-League champions.

On 28 December 2009, after 8 years of spending his career abroad, Sutee joined a Thai Premier League club, Bangkok Glass. Following the expiration of his contract in Bangkok, Suksomkit sign with Suphanburi and then TTM Customs and Krabi. After he joined Krabi F.C. and played for a while, he decided to retired from professional footballer after the end of the season in 2015.

== Honours ==
=== International ===
Thailand

- ASEAN Football Championship

(gold) Winners : 2000, 2002
(silver) Runner-up : 2007, 2008

Thailand U23

- Asian Games

Quarterfinals : 2006

Thailand U17

- AFC U-17 Championship

(silver) Runner-up : 1996

=== Club ===
Thai Farmers Bank F.C.

- Kor Royal Cup Winner (1) : 2000

Home United

- S.League Champions (1) : 2003
- Singapore Cup Winner (2) : 2003 2005

Bangkok Glass

- Singapore Cup Winner (1) : 2010

== International career ==
In the 2004 AFC Asian Cup, Sutee scored a goal against Japan, which was the only goal Thailand scored in the entire tournament.

In the 2007 AFC Asian Cup, he scored for Thailand in the opening match against Iraq from the penalty spot.

=== International goals ===
Goal	Date	Venue	Opponent	Score	Result	Competition
1	10 June 2000	Bangkok, Thailand	Qatar	2-3	Lost	Friendly
2	3 September 2000	Beijing, China	Uzbekistan	4-2	Won	Friendly Tournament
3	30 September 2000	Kuwait City, Kuwait	Kuwait	2-3	Lost	Friendly
4	27 January 2001	Singapore	Singapore	5-4 (pens)	Lost	Friendly
5	13 August 2001	Singapore	Singapore	5-0	Won	Friendly
6	22 September 2001	Bangkok, Thailand	Iraq	1-1	Draw	2002 FIFA World Cup qualification
7	10 July 2004	Bangkok, Thailand	Trinidad and Tobago	3-2	Won	Friendly
8	24 July 2004	Chongqing, China	Japan	1-4	Lost	Asian Cup 2004
9	8 September 2004	Pyongyang, North Korea	North Korea	1-4	Lost	2006 FIFA World Cup qualification
10	30 December 2006	Bangkok, Thailand	Vietnam	3-1	Won	King's Cup 2006
11	2 July 2007	Bangkok, Thailand	Qatar	2-0	Won	Friendly
12	7 July 2007	Bangkok, Thailand	Iraq	1-1	Draw	Asian Cup 2007
13	6 December 2008	Phuket, Thailand	Vietnam	2-0	Won	2008 AFF Suzuki Cup
14	10 December 2008	Phuket, Thailand	Malaysia	3-0	Won	2008 AFF Suzuki Cup
—	23 January 2009	Phuket, Thailand	Denmark	2-2	Draw	2009 King's Cup
—	23 January 2009	Phuket, Thailand	Denmark	2-2	Draw	2009 King's Cup
15	14 November 2009	Singapore	Singapore	3-1	Won	2011 AFC Asian Cup qualification
16	14 November 2009	Singapore	Singapore	3-1	Won	2011 AFC Asian Cup qualification
17	17 January 2010	Nakhon Ratchasima, Thailand	Singapore	1-0	Won	2010 King's Cup

- 2 goals against Denmark in 2009 King's Cup. Non official FIFA match
