= Nirut Surasiang =

Thai-Vietnamese footballer

Personal information
- Full name: Nirut Surasiang
- Date of birth: 20 February 1979 (age 47)
- Place of birth: Ratchaburi, Thailand
- Height: 1.78 m (5 ft 10 in)
- Positions: Defender; midfielder

Senior career*
Years	Team	Apps	(Gls)
1999–2003	BEC Tero Sasana	46	(10)
2004–2008	Bình Định	131	(22)
2009–2010	Hoàng Anh Gia Lai	29	(1)
2011–2012	Navibank Sài Gòn	21	(0)
2012	Bangkok Glass	12	(0)
2013	Suphanburi	4	(0)
2014–2015	Army United	0	(0)
Total		231	(33)

International career^{‡}
2000–2009	Thailand	62	(5)

Managerial career
- 2014–2016: Army United (assistant)
- 2017–2018: Khon Kaen (assistant)
- 2022: Kanchanaburi City
- 2023–2024: Thailand U23 (assistant)
- 2024: Lopburi City
Medal record
Thailand under-23
Sea Games
Gold medal – first place	Sea Games 2001	Football
- * Club domestic league appearances and goals as of 18 January 2015 ‡ National team caps and goals as of 18 November 2009

Nirut Surasiang (Thai: นิรุจน์ สุระเสียง, born February 20, 1979), simply known as Tum (Thai: ตั้ม), is a Thai football coach and former player.

He was Vietnamese granted Vietnamese citizenship in 2009, under the name Đoàn Văn Nirut.

== International goals ==
#	Date	Venue	Opponent	Score	Result	Competition
1.	April 4, 2000	Bangkok, Thailand	North Korea	2–1	5–3	2000 AFC Asian Cup qualification
2.	November 21, 2003	Bangkok, Thailand	Uzbekistan	2–0	4–1	2004 Asian Cup Qualification
3.	March 31, 2004	Sana'a, Yemen	Yemen	2–0	3–0	2006 FIFA World Cup qualification
4.	October 15, 2007	Estádio Campo Desportivo, Macau, Macau	Macau	3–0	7–1	2010 FIFA World Cup Qualification

== Honours ==
=== Club ===
BEC Tero Sasana

- Thai Premier League Champions (2) : 2000, 2001-02
- Kor Royal Cup Winners (1) : 2001

Binh Dinh

- Vietnamese Cup Winners (1) : 2004

Navibank Saigon

- Vietnamese Cup Winners (1) : 2011
