= Chukiat Noosarung =

Thai footballer (born 1971)

Personal information
- Full name: Chukiat Noosarung
- Date of birth: 25 June 1971 (age 55)
- Place of birth: Chaiyaphum, Thailand
- Height: 1.75 m (5 ft 9 in)
- Positions: Defender; defensive midfielder

Team information
- Current team: Chaiyaphum United (head coach)

Senior career*
Years	Team	Apps	(Gls)
1992–2001	Rajpracha	190	(9)
2002–2004	Hoang Anh Gia Lai	41	(2)
2005–2007	Cha Choeng Sao	46	(5)
2009	Chaiyaphum United	7	(0)
Total		284	(16)

International career
1995–2003	Thailand	84	(4)

Managerial career
- 2009–: Chaiyaphum United
Medal record
Thailand national football team
Sea Games
Gold medal – first place	Sea Games 1999	Football
- * Club domestic league appearances and goals

Chukiat Noosarung (Thai ชูเกียรติ หนูสลุง) is a Thai former football player. He is a defender who scored 4 goals for the Thailand national team, and played in several FIFA World Cup qualifying matches. In present, he is currently player-manager of Chaiyaphum United in the Thai Second Division of the football league.

== International goals ==
#	Date	Venue	Opponent	Score	Result	Competition
1.	December 12, 1995	Chiang Mai, Thailand	Cambodia	9-0	Won	1995 Southeast Asian Games
2.	April 4, 2000	Bangkok, Thailand	North Korea	5-3	Won	2000 Asian Cup Qualification
3.	April 8, 2000	Bangkok, Thailand	Malaysia	3-2	Won	2000 Asian Cup Qualification
4.	December 29, 2002	Singapore	Indonesia	4-2 (pens)	Won	2002 Tiger Cup
