= Seksan Piturat =

Thai footballer

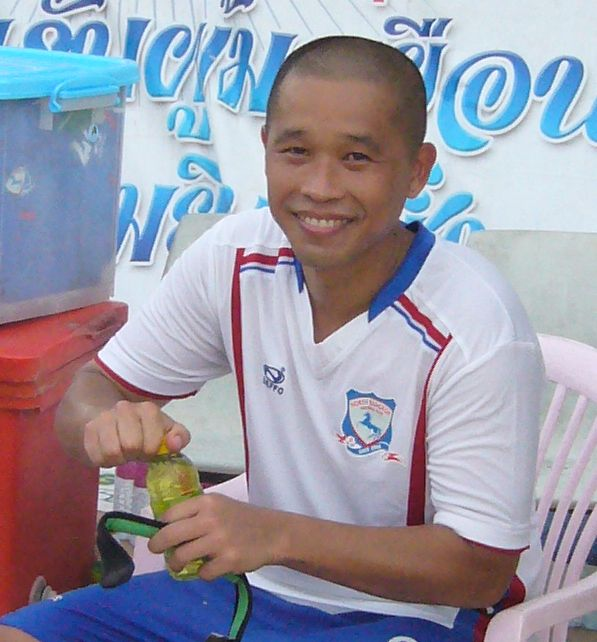

Personal information
- Full name: Seksan Piturat
- Date of birth: 2 January 1976 (age 50)
- Place of birth: Mae Hong Son, Thailand
- Height: 1.75 m (5 ft 9 in)
- Position: Striker

Senior career*
Years	Team	Apps	(Gls)
1996–2003	Sinthana	131	(77)
2003–2004	BEC Tero Sasana	18	(4)
2005	PEA	10	(3)
2006–2007	TOT	22	(9)
2007–2008	Raj-Vithi	31	(9)
2008	Royal Thai Police	19	(7)
2010–2012	North Bangkok College	8	(2)
Total		239	(111)

International career
1999–2003	Thailand	47	(19)
Medal record
Thailand national football team
Sea Games
Gold medal – first place	Sea Games 1999	Football
- * Club domestic league appearances and goals

Seksan Piturat (also written Sakesan Pituratana) (Thai: เศกสรรค์ ปิตุรัตน์) or the nickname "James" is a Thai former football player, who has been described as the "Ronaldo" of Thai football. He played as a striker for Thailand national team in various tournaments such as World Cup 2002 (Qualifying), Asian Cup 2000 and scored 19 goals for the national team. He previously played in the Thailand Division 1 League with Royal Thai Police FC.

== International goals ==
#	Date	Venue	Opponent	Score	Result	Competition
1.	30 July 1999	Bandar Seri Begawan, Brunei	Philippines	9–0	Won	1999 South East Asian Games
2.	1 August 1999	Bandar Seri Begawan, Brunei	Laos	4–1	Won	1999 South East Asian Games
3.	8 August 1999	Bandar Seri Begawan, Brunei	Myanmar	7–0	Won	1999 South East Asian Games
4.	27 March 2000	Kuala Lumpur, Malaysia	Taiwan	2–0	Won	Asian Cup Qualification 2000
5.	4 April 2000	Bangkok, Thailand	North Korea	5–3	Won	Asian Cup Qualification 2000
6.	3 September 2000	Shanghai, China	Uzbekistan	4–2	Won	2000 Four Nations Tournament
7.	15 October 2000	Beirut, Lebanon	Iran	1–1	Drew	2000 Asian Cup
8.	18 December 2000	Beirut, Lebanon	Lebanon	1–1	Drew	2000 Asian Cup
9.	6 November 2000	Chiang Mai, Thailand	Myanmar	3–1	Won	2000 Tiger Cup
10.	30 January 2001	Bangkok, Thailand	Kyrgyzstan	3–1	Won	Friendly
11.	15 May 2001	Beirut, Lebanon	Pakistan	3–0	Won	2002 FIFA World Cup Qualification
12.	15 May 2001	Beirut, Lebanon	Pakistan	3–0	Won	2002 FIFA World Cup Qualification
13.	17 May 2001	Beirut, Lebanon	Lebanon	2–1	Won	2002 FIFA World Cup Qualification
14.	26 May 2001	Bangkok, Thailand	Sri Lanka	3–0	Won	2002 FIFA World Cup Qualification
15.	30 May 2001	Bangkok, Thailand	Lebanon	2–2	Drew	2002 FIFA World Cup Qualification
16.	13 August 2001	Singapore	Singapore	5–0	Won	Friendly
17.	13 August 2001	Singapore	Singapore	5–0	Won	Friendly
18.	15 September 2001	Bangkok, Thailand	Saudi Arabia	1–3	Lost	2002 FIFA World Cup Qualification
19.	21 October 2001	Riyadh, Saudi Arabia	Saudi Arabia	1–4	Lost	2002 FIFA World Cup Qualification
