= Kwanchai Fuangprakob =

Thai footballer (born 1978)

Personal information
- Full name: Kwanchai Fuangprakob
- Date of birth: 28 May 1978 (age 48)
- Place of birth: Sa Kaeo, Prachinburi, Thailand (now in Sa Kaeo Province)
- Height: 1.69 m (5 ft 6 1/2 in)
- Position: Striker

Senior career*
Years	Team	Apps	(Gls)
1996–2001	Rajnavy Rayong	62	(44)
2002–2003	BEC Tero Sasana	45	(18)
2004	Bangkok University	27	(11)
2005–2010	TTM Samut Sakhon	72	(36)
2011	Chanthaburi	21	(5)
2012–2013	Sa Kaeo	10	(2)

International career^{‡}
1999–2007	Thailand	11	(2)
- * Club domestic league appearances and goals as of 07:00, 17 September 2017 (UTC) ‡ National team caps and goals as of 07:00, 17 September 2017 (UTC)

Kwanchai Fuangprakob (born May 28, 1978, Thai: ขวัญชัย เฟื่องประกอบ) or the nickname "Dum" is a Thai former footballer and Thailand national team in 1999-2007. He primary plays as a striker and scored 2 goals for the national team and the nickname which is Romario of Thailand happened.

== Honours ==
- 2005 Thailand Premier League Winner with Thailand Tobacco Monopoly

== International goals ==
#	Date	Venue	Opponent	Score	Result	Competition
1.	March 29, 2000	Kuala Lumpur, Malaysia	Malaysia	2-3	Lost	2000 Asian Cup Qualification
2.	February 10, 2002	Bangkok, Thailand	Singapore	4-0	Won	King's Cup 2002
