= Pipat Thonkanya =

Thai footballer

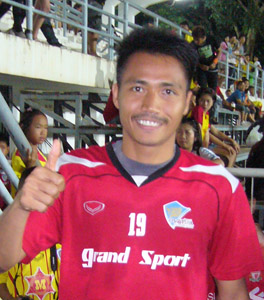

Personal information
- Full name: Pipat Thonkanya
- Birth name: Anon Thonkanya
- Date of birth: 4 January 1979 (age 47)
- Place of birth: Udon Thani, Thailand
- Height: 1.73 m (5 ft 8 in)
- Position: Forward

Youth career
- 1995–1997: Udon Pittayanukoon School

Senior career*
Years	Team	Apps	(Gls)
1998–2001	Rajpracha	57	(28)
2002–2004	Bình Định	26	(12)
2005–2006	Đồng Tháp	17	(8)
2006–2007	BEC Tero Sasana	22	(7)
2007–2008	PEA	28	(9)
2008–2009	Thai Port	29	(10)
2009–2010	Persisam Putra	30	(10)
2010–2011	Buriram PEA	4	(1)
2011–2012	Osotspa Saraburi	28	(12)
2012	Suphanburi	30	(15)
2013–2014	PTT Rayong	17	(9)
2014	→ Chiangmai (loan)	15	(5)
2015	Phuket	17	(5)
2016	Udon Thani	11	(3)
2017	Amnat United	9	(0)
2020–2021	Pattaya Discovery United	10	(1)
Total		350	(135)

International career
2000–2011	Thailand	30	(13)

Managerial career
- 2019–2021: Pattaya Discovery United (player-manager)
- * Club domestic league appearances and goals

Pipat Thonkanya (Thai: พิพัฒน์ ต้นกันยา; RTGS: Phiphat Tonkanya) born 4 January 1979 as Anon Thonkanya, is a Thai former football player. He was a forward.

In 2003, Pipat also had spells at AFC Champions League 2003 runners up BEC Tero Sasana and a spell in Vietnam with Bình Định and Đồng Tháp. He was also instrumental in PEA FC winning the 2008 Thai Premier League. In 2009, he played for Persisam Samarinda in the Indonesian Super League. At the half way stage in the 2009 Thai Premier League season, he was joint second in the top goalscorers list with 7 goals.

He scored 14 goals for the national team, including 2 goals in the 2007 Asian Cup, and was recently recalled to the national team, thanks to his good performances for Thai Port.

== International career ==
Pipat was a member of the victorious T&T Cup 2008 winning squad. He scored two goals in the 2007 Asian Cup for the national team in a successful campaign where they were eliminated only on goal difference from a tough group containing Australia and eventual winners Iraq. Thonkanya's goals came in the form of a brace against Oman in a 2–0 win (scoring in the 70th and 78th minutes).

== International goals ==
#	Date	Venue	Opponent	Score	Result	Competition
1.	25 February 2000	Bangkok, Thailand	Estonia	2–1	Won	King's Cup 2000
2.	25 February 2000	Bangkok, Thailand	Estonia	2–1	Won	King's Cup 2000
3.	27 February 2000	Bangkok, Thailand	Finland	5–1	Won	King's Cup 2000
4.	4 April 2000	Bangkok, Thailand	North Korea	5–3	Won	2000 AFC Asian Cup qualification
5.	28 December 2006	Bangkok, Thailand	Kazakhstan	2–2	Draw	King's Cup 2006
6.	30 December 2006	Bangkok, Thailand	Vietnam	3–1	Won	King's Cup 2006
7.	14 January 2007	Bangkok, Thailand	Philippines	4–0	Won	2007 ASEAN Football Championship
8.	24 January 2007	Hanoi, Vietnam	Vietnam	2–0	Won	2007 ASEAN Football Championship
9.	31 January 2007	Singapore	Singapore	1–2	Lost	2007 ASEAN Football Championship
10.	4 February 2007	Bangkok, Thailand	Singapore	1–1	Draw	2007 ASEAN Football Championship
11.	16 June 2007	Bangkok, Thailand	China	1–0	Won	Friendly
12.	12 July 2007	Bangkok, Thailand	Oman	2–0	Won	Asian Cup 2007
13.	12 July 2007	Bangkok, Thailand	Oman	2–0	Won	Asian Cup 2007

== Honours ==
International

- 2000 Tiger Cup with Winners
- T&T Cup: 2008

Clubs

- Thailand Premier League 2008
