= Thanunchai Baribarn =

Thai footballer (born 1972)

Personal information
- Full name: Thanunchai Baribarn
- Date of birth: 3 October 1972 (age 54)
- Place of birth: Sisaket, Thailand
- Height: 1.75 m (5 ft 9 in)
- Positions: Midfielder; defender

Senior career*
Years	Team	Apps	(Gls)
1999–2003	Sinthana	59	(7)
2003–2005	PEA		
2006–2008	TOT		
Total		59	(7)

International career
1999–2002	Thailand	37	(6)
Medal record
Thailand national football team
Sea Games
Gold medal – first place	Sea Games 1999	Football
- * Club domestic league appearances and goals

Thanunchai Baribarn (Thai: ธนัญชัย บริบาล, born 3 October 1972) is a Thai retired professional footballer who played as a midfielder for the Thailand national team from 1999 to 2002, in various tournaments such as the 1999 Southeast Asian Games, the 2000 King's Cup and the Asian Cup in 2000 and 2002. He scored 6 goals for the national team.

== International goals ==
#	Date	Venue	Opponent	Score	Result	Competition
1.	8 August 1999	Bandar Seri Begawan, Brunei	Myanmar	7–0	Won	1999 Southeast Asian Games
2.	27 February 2000	Bangkok, Thailand	Finland	5–1	Won	King's Cup 2000
3.	8 April 2000	Bangkok, Thailand	Malaysia	3–2	Won	2000 Asian Cup Qualification
4.	8 April 2000	Bangkok, Thailand	Malaysia	3–2	Won	2000 Asian Cup Qualification
5.	23 January 2001	Bangkok, Thailand	Kuwait	5–4	Won	Friendly
6.	30 January 2001	Bangkok, Thailand	Kyrgyzstan	3–1	Won	Friendly

== Honours ==
=== International ===
Thailand

- Sea Games
  - Gold Medal (1) : 1999
