= Suphachalasai Stadium =

Stadium in Bangkok, Thailand

Coordinates: 13°44′44″N 100°31′32″E

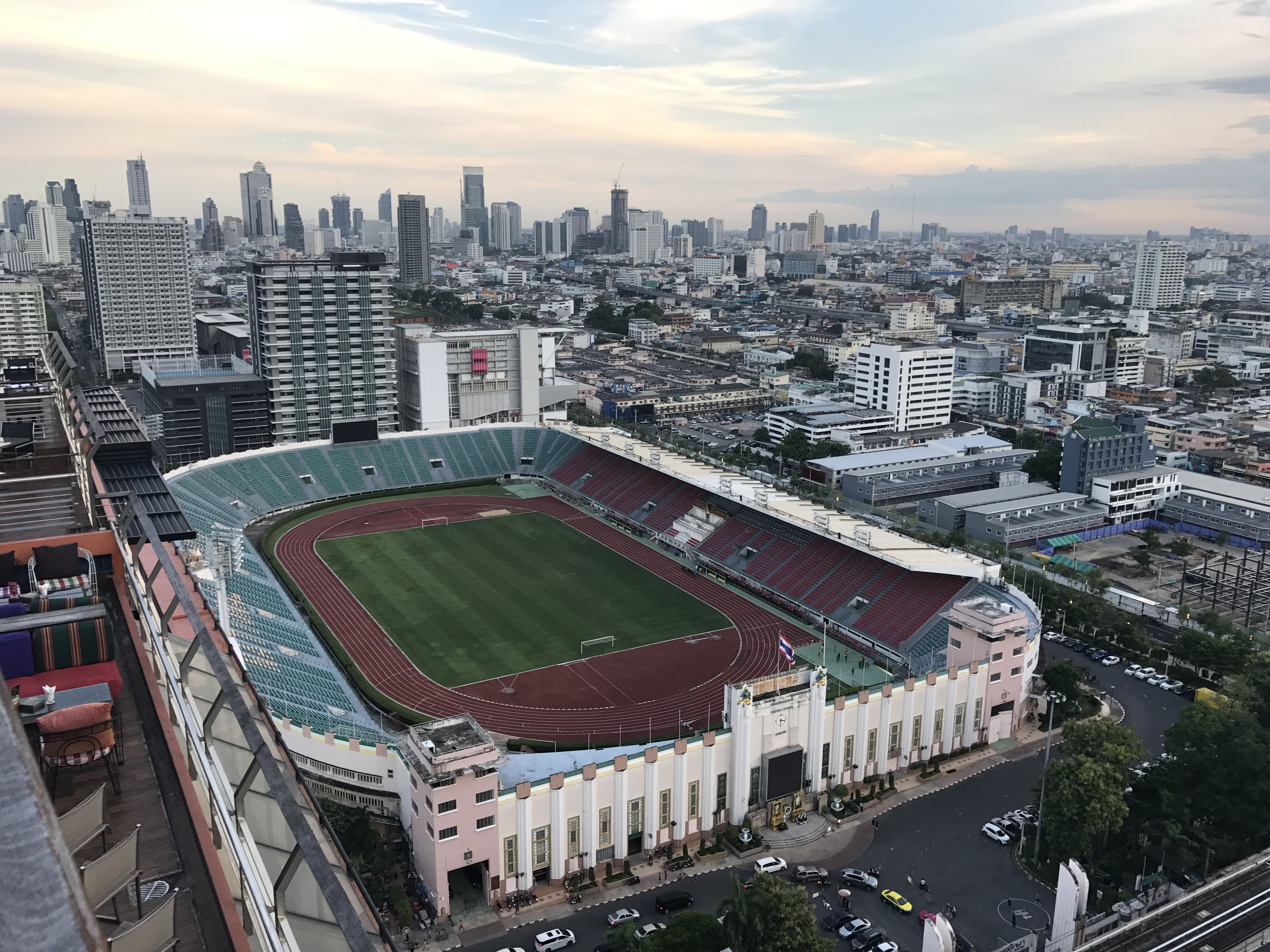
- Interactive map of Suphachalasai Stadium
- Location: Wang Mai, Pathum Wan, Bangkok, Thailand
- Owner: Chulalongkorn University
- Operator: Department of Physical Education
- Capacity: 19,793 / 35,000 (concerts)
- Surface: Grass
- Public transit: BTS National Stadium

Construction
- Built: 1937
- Opened: 1938
- Expanded: 1941
- Architect: Department of Physical Education

Tenant
- Thailand national football team (1948–1998)

The Suphachalasai Stadium (Thai: สนามศุภชลาศัย) is a sports stadium in Bangkok, Thailand, part of the National Stadium complex.

== History ==
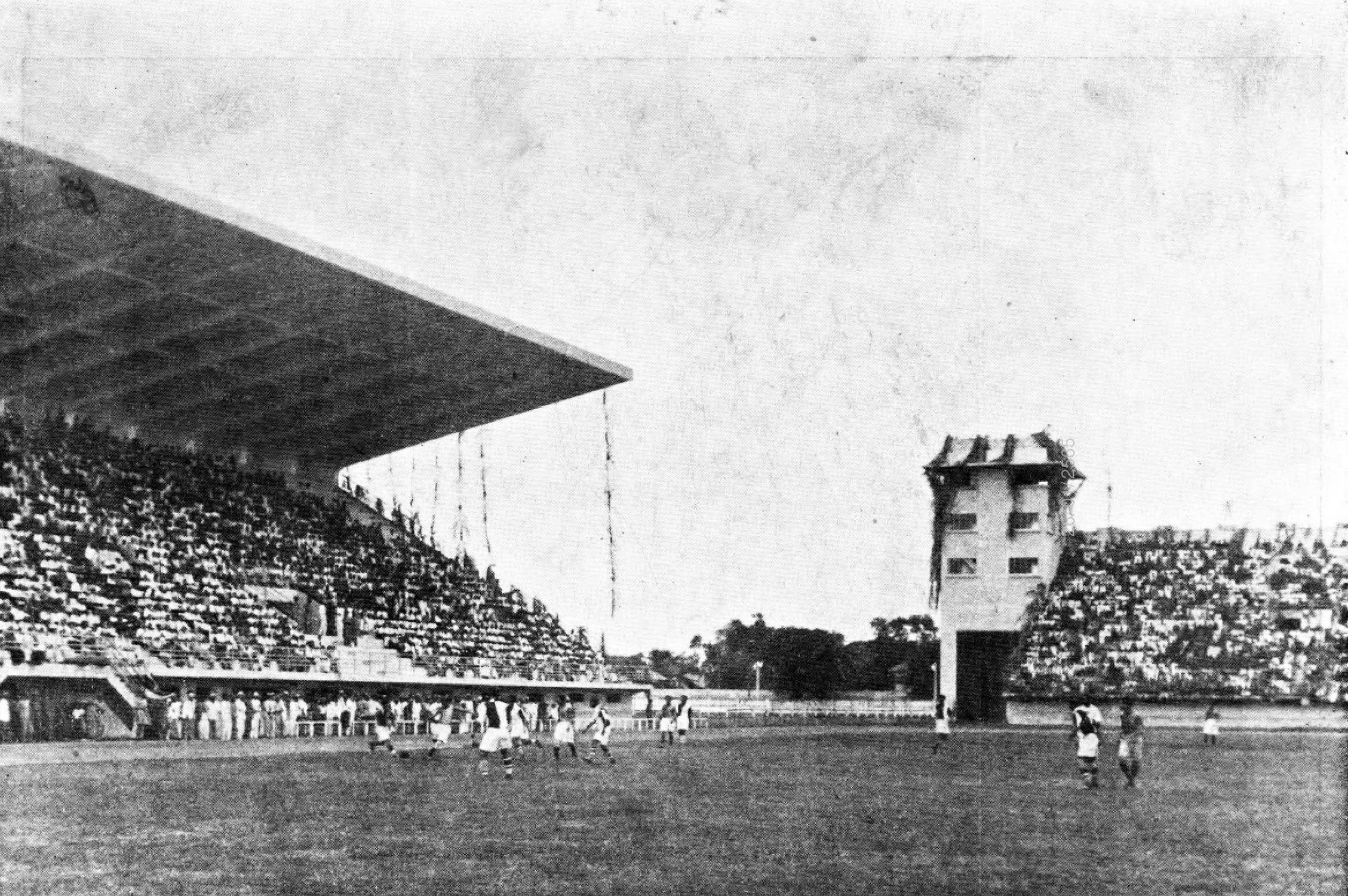
Suphachalasai Stadium in 1943

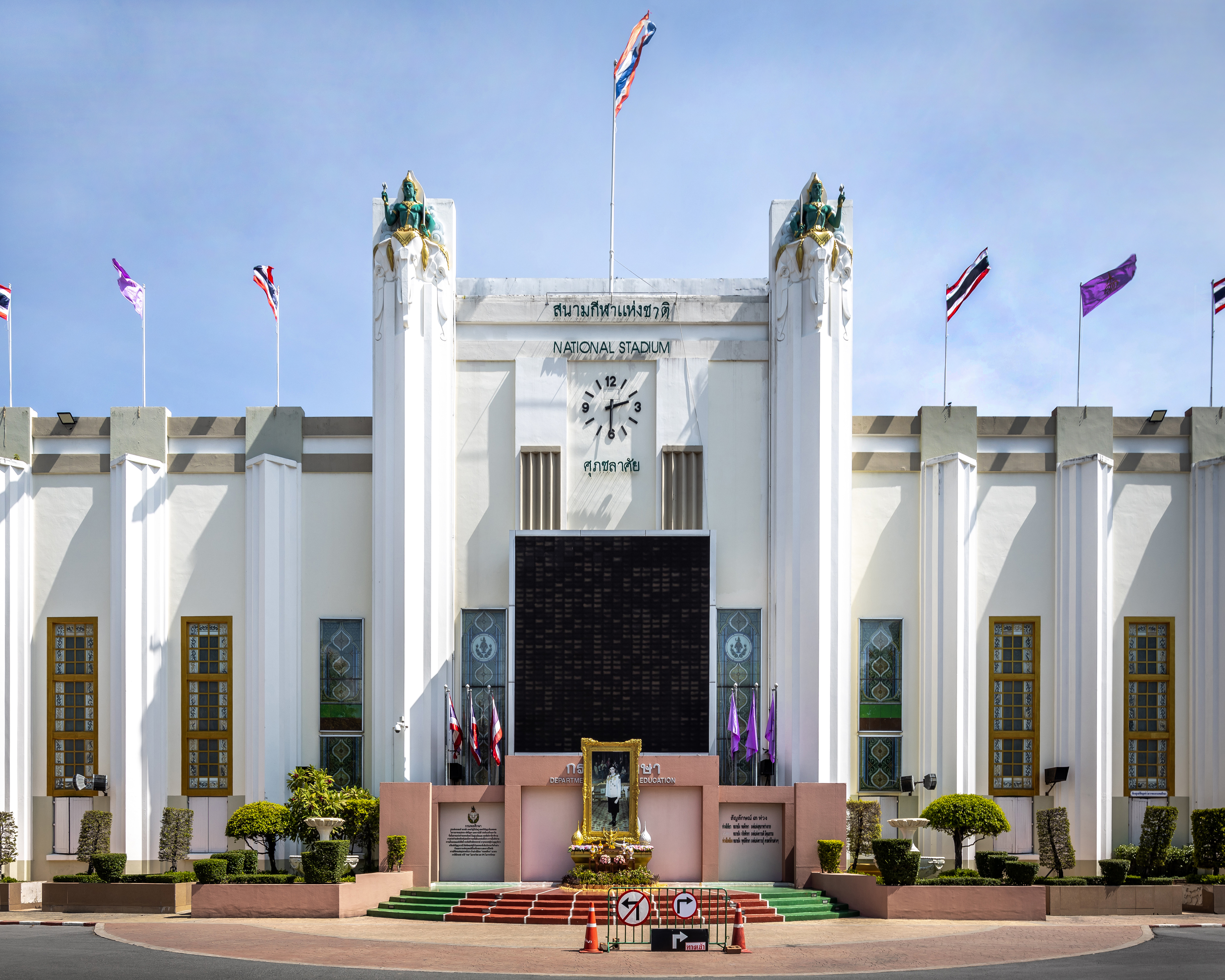
Suphachalasai Stadium's main entry, designed by Sarot Sukkhayang in the Art Deco style

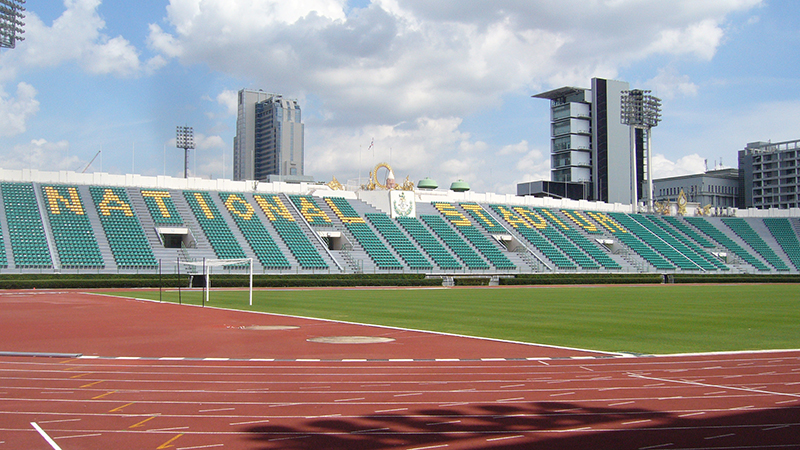
Suphachalasai Stadium in 2015

The stadium construction started in 1937 in the original area of Thai Windsor Palace that demolished in 1935. The Department of Physical Education entered into a 29-year lease agreement with Chulalongkorn University. First use of the stadium happened when King Ananda Mahidol presided over in the opening ceremony of 1938 men's athletics competition, which changed the venue from Sanam Luang.

The stadium is named after Luang Suphachalasai (Bung Suphachalasai), considered the Father of Thai Sport and the first Director-General of Thai Department of Physical Education.

It is used mostly for staging football matches. It served as the main stadium for the 1966, 1970, and 1978 Asian Games. It was also used for the 2007 AFC Asian Cup, but only for one game (Oman v Iraq in Group A). The stadium is easy for spectators to get to as it is served by the BTS Skytrain which stops at the adjacent 'National Stadium BTS station'.

The stadium is a single tier construction which is uncovered on three sides. A plain but effective roof covers the main-stand side. Although there is a running track, the tribunes are immediately adjacent to it so spectators are not as far from the action as they are at the newer Rajamangala Stadium. Spectator comfort was increased in 2007 with the addition of red bench seats to the previously bare concrete steps on the three open sides.

Thai league clubs often play at the Suphachalasai in Asian competitions as their own stadiums do not meet Asian Football Confederation criteria. However, it is now rarely used by the national team who usually play at the Rajamangala National Stadium. Other stadiums in Bangkok include the Thai Army Sports Stadium, the Thai-Japanese Stadium and Chulalongkorn University Stadium.

== Events ==
List entertainment event in Suphachalasai Stadium
Date	Artist	Event	Attendance	Revenue	Ref
August 24 and 27, 1993	Michael Jackson	Dangerous World Tour	80,000 / 80,000	—	
January 7 and 8, 2023	Blackpink	Born Pink World Tour	66,211 / 66,211	$12,393,129	
December 14, 2024	Stray Kids	Dominate World Tour	20,600 / 20,600	$3,019,991	
March 7 and 8, 2026	Three Man Down	Three Man Down Live At Suphachalasai	50,000 / 50,000		
March 14 and 15, 2026	Seventeen	New_ World Tour	—	—	
May 16, 2026	Treasure	Pulse On Tour	—	—	
