= 2002 AFF Championship squads =

Association football competition squads

Below are the squads for the 2002 AFF Championship, co-hosted by Indonesia and Singapore, which took place between 15 and 29 December 2002. The players' listed age is their age on the tournament's opening day (15 December 2002).

== Group A ==
=== Vietnam ===
Head coach: (Portugal) Henrique Calisto

No.	Pos.	Player	Date of birth (age)	Caps	Club
1	GK	Võ Văn Hạnh	10 April 1974 (aged 28)		(Vietnam) Sông Lam Nghệ An
3	DF	Nguyễn Huy Hoàng	4 January 1981 (aged 21)		(Vietnam) Sông Lam Nghệ An
4	DF	Phạm Như Thuần	22 October 1975 (aged 27)		(Vietnam) Thể Công
5	DF	Phạm Hùng Dũng	28 September 1978 (aged 24)		(Vietnam) SHB Đà Nẵng
6	DF	Nguyễn Đức Thắng	28 May 1976 (aged 26)		(Vietnam) Thể Công
8	MF	Nguyễn Văn Sỹ	21 November 1971 (aged 31)		(Vietnam) Nam Định
9	FW	Huỳnh Hồng Sơn	27 April 1969 (aged 33)		(Vietnam) Cảng Sài Gòn
10	FW	Lê Huỳnh Đức (c)	20 April 1972 (aged 30)		(China) Chongqing Dangdai Lifan
12	MF	Nguyễn Minh Phương	5 July 1980 (aged 22)		(Vietnam) Cảng Sài Gòn
14	MF	Triệu Quang Hà	9 March 1975 (aged 27)		(Vietnam) Thể Công
15	DF	Nguyễn Quốc Trung	10 April 1979 (aged 23)		(Vietnam) Thể Công
16	GK	Trần Minh Quang	19 April 1973 (aged 29)		(Vietnam) Bình Định
17	FW	Ngô Quang Trường	21 January 1972 (aged 30)		(Vietnam) Sông Lam Nghệ An
18	DF	Lương Trung Tuấn	20 July 1977 (aged 25)		(Vietnam) Cảng Sài Gòn
19	DF	Phạm Minh Đức	5 May 1976 (aged 26)		(Vietnam) Hàng Không
20	FW	Đặng Phương Nam	15 December 1976 (aged 26)		(Vietnam) Thể Công
21	MF	Trần Trường Giang	1 November 1976 (aged 26)		(Vietnam) Tiền Giang
22	MF	Phan Văn Tài Em	23 April 1982 (aged 20)		(Vietnam) Đồng Tâm Long An
23	FW	Phạm Văn Quyến	29 April 1984 (aged 18)		(Vietnam) Sông Lam Nghệ An
26	MF	Trịnh Xuân Thành	23 January 1976 (aged 26)		(Vietnam) Thể Công

=== Indonesia ===
Head coach: (Bulgaria) Ivan Venkov Kolev

No.	Pos.	Player	Date of birth (age)	Caps	Club
1	GK	Hendro Kartiko	24 April 1973 (aged 29)	27	(Indonesia) PSPS Pekanbaru
2	DF	Agung Setyabudi (c)	2 November 1972 (aged 30)	33	(Indonesia) Persebaya Surabaya
3	DF	Isnan Ali	15 September 1979 (aged 23)	3	(Indonesia) Persikota Tangerang
4	DF	Aples Tecuari	21 April 1973 (aged 29)	33	(Indonesia) Pelita Jaya
5	DF	Bejo Sugiantoro	2 April 1977 (aged 25)	34	(Indonesia) Persebaya Surabaya
6	DF	Firmansyah	7 April 1980 (aged 22)	0	(Indonesia) Persikota Tangerang
7	FW	Jaenal Ichwan	1 May 1977 (aged 25)	1	(Indonesia) Petrokimia Putra
8	MF	Elie Aiboy	20 April 1979 (aged 23)	2	(Indonesia) Semen Padang
10	FW	Zaenal Arif	3 January 1981 (aged 21)	1	(Indonesia) Persita Tangerang
11	DF	Supriyono Salimin	10 August 1981 (aged 21)	1	(Indonesia) PSMS Medan
12	GK	Jendri Pitoy	15 January 1981 (aged 21)	0	(Indonesia) Persikota Tangerang
13	FW	Budi Sudarsono	19 September 1979 (aged 23)	3	(Indonesia) Persija Jakarta
14	MF	I Putu Gede	1 December 1973 (aged 29)	8	(Indonesia) Deltras Sidoarjo
15	MF	Yaris Riyadi	21 January 1973 (aged 29)	8	(Indonesia) Persib Bandung
16	MF	Imran Nahumarury	12 November 1978 (aged 24)	13	(Indonesia) Persija Jakarta
17	DF	Harry Saputra	12 June 1981 (aged 21)	1	(Indonesia) Persikota Tangerang
18	MF	Amir Yusuf Pohan	14 September 1971 (aged 31)	1	(Indonesia) Barito Putera
19	DF	Nur'alim	27 December 1973 (aged 28)	39	(Indonesia) Persija Jakarta
20	FW	Bambang Pamungkas	10 June 1980 (aged 22)	17	(Indonesia) Persija Jakarta
22	FW	Gendut Doni Christiawan	7 December 1978 (aged 24)	11	(Indonesia) Persija Jakarta

=== Myanmar ===
Head coach: (England) David Booth

No.	Pos.	Player	Date of birth (age)	Caps	Club
	GK	Aung Aung Oo	8 June 1982 (aged 20)		(Myanmar) Finance and Revenue
	GK	Hein Zayer Kyaw	29 July 1985 (aged 17)		(Myanmar) Finance and Revenue
	DF	Min Min Aung	8 January 1977 (aged 25)		(Myanmar) Finance and Revenue
	DF	Zaw Lynn Tun	20 October 1982 (aged 20)		(Myanmar) Ministry of Commerce FC
	DF	Min Thu	2 June 1979 (aged 23)		(Myanmar) Ministry of Commerce FC
	DF	Zaw Lynn Tun II	23 July 1983 (aged 19)		(Myanmar)
	DF	Khin Maung Tun	19 August 1985 (aged 17)		(Myanmar) Finance and Revenue
	DF	Soe Lin Tun	27 November 1985 (aged 17)		(Myanmar) Finance and Revenue
	DF	Aye Min Tun	2 December 1982 (aged 20)		(Myanmar) Ministry of Energy FC
	DF	Htay Aung	15 August 1985 (aged 17)		(Myanmar) Ministry of Defense FC
	MF	Zaw Zaw	13 October 1986 (aged 16)		(Myanmar) Yangon City Development Committee
	MF	Soe Myat Min	19 May 1982 (aged 20)		(Myanmar) Finance and Revenue
	MF	Aung Kyaw Moe	2 July 1982 (aged 20)		(Myanmar) Finance and Revenue
	MF	Lwin Oo	8 March 1983 (aged 19)		(Myanmar) Finance and Revenue
	MF	Tint Naing Tun Thein	22 May 1983 (aged 19)		(Myanmar) Yangon City Development Committee
	MF	San Maung	12 January 1980 (aged 22)		(Myanmar) Ministry of Defense FC
	FW	Zaw Htike	28 July 1983 (aged 19)		(Myanmar) Finance and Revenue
	FW	Kyaw Soe Oo	2 November 1976 (aged 26)		(Myanmar) Ministry of Construction FC
	FW	Kyaw Thu Ya	10 December 1984 (aged 18)		(Myanmar) Finance and Revenue
	FW	Yan Paing	27 November 1983 (aged 19)		(Myanmar) Finance and Revenue

=== Cambodia ===
Head coach: (Germany) Joachim Fickert

No.	Pos.	Player	Date of birth (age)	Caps	Club
1	GK	Ouk Mic	15 September 1983 (aged 19)		(Cambodia)
2	DF	Chek Sokhom	12 August 1982 (aged 20)		(Cambodia)
3	DF	Chea Sameth	11 April 1972 (aged 30)		(Cambodia)
4	DF	Soeur Chanveasna	10 November 1978 (aged 24)		(Cambodia)
5	DF	Peas Sothy	15 December 1979 (aged 23)		(Cambodia)
6	MF	Samel Nasa	25 April 1984 (aged 18)		(Cambodia)
7	MF	Kao Nisai	15 April 1980 (aged 22)		(Cambodia)
8	MF	Ieng Saknida	17 March 1980 (aged 22)		(Cambodia)
9	FW	Hok Sochetra	27 July 1974 (aged 28)		(Cambodia) Smart United
10	MF	Chan Rithy	11 November 1983 (aged 19)		(Cambodia)
11	MF	Meas Channa	20 July 1983 (aged 19)		(Cambodia)
12	MF	Ung Kanyanith	12 December 1982 (aged 20)		(Cambodia) Smart United
13	GK	Oum Chandara	8 June 1983 (aged 19)		(Cambodia)
14	DF	Kim Chanburith	13 March 1979 (aged 23)		(Cambodia) Nagacorp
15	DF	Mam Visan			(Cambodia)
16	FW	Hok Sotitia	27 July 1984 (aged 18)		(Cambodia) Smart United
17	FW	Hok Sochivorn	23 September 1983 (aged 19)		(Cambodia)
18	GK	Thai Sineth	10 January 1984 (aged 18)		(Cambodia)
19	DF	Sun Sampratna	13 July 1982 (aged 20)		(Cambodia) Smart United
20	MF	Tes Sophat	28 November 1982 (aged 20)		(Cambodia)

=== Philippines ===
Head coach: (Japan) Sugao Kambe

No.	Pos.	Player	Date of birth (age)	Caps	Club
	GK	Edmundo Mercado	7 June 1974 (aged 28)		(Philippines) Philippine Air Force
	GK	Alvin Montañez	10 December 1983 (aged 19)		(Philippines)
	DF	Ziggy Tonog	16 July 1976 (aged 26)		(Philippines) Philippine Air Force
	DF	Mark Villon	6 July 1983 (aged 19)		(Philippines) San Beda College
	DF	Wilson de la Cruz	8 May 1979 (aged 23)		(Philippines) Philippine Army
	DF	Neil Calinawagan	4 November 1982 (aged 20)		(Philippines) West Negros College
	DF	Billy Estrella	17 February 1973 (aged 29)		(Philippines) Philippine Army
	DF	Solomon Licuanan	9 May 1981 (aged 21)		(Philippines) University of Mindanao
	DF	Leo Jaena	30 October 1974 (aged 28)		(Philippines)
	MF	Roel Gener	27 June 1974 (aged 28)		(Philippines)
	MF	Jeffrey Liman	19 May 1984 (aged 18)		(Philippines)
	MF	Alvin Ocampo	5 August 1977 (aged 25)		(Philippines) Kaya
	MF	Marjo Allado	15 February 1978 (aged 24)		(Philippines) Sunday FC
	MF	Dan Padernal	17 May 1981 (aged 21)		(Philippines)
	MF	Ali Go	21 September 1976 (aged 26)		(Philippines)
	MF	Richard Cañedo	26 May 1980 (aged 22)		(Philippines)
	FW	Freddy Gonzalez	1 October 1978 (aged 24)		(Philippines) Kaya
	FW	Ian Araneta	2 March 1982 (aged 20)		Unattached
	FW	Jimmy Doña	10 May 1978 (aged 24)		(Philippines)
	FW	Joshua Fegidero	8 April 1981 (aged 21)		(Philippines)

== Group B ==
=== Malaysia ===
Head coach: (England) Allan Harris

No.	Pos.	Player	Date of birth (age)	Caps	Club
1	GK	Azmin Azram Abdul Aziz	1 April 1976 (aged 26)		(Malaysia) Selangor
3	DF	Norhafiz Zamani Misbah	15 July 1981 (aged 21)		(Malaysia) Negeri Sembilan
5	DF	Victor Andrag	29 March 1976 (aged 26)		(Malaysia) Kedah
6	MF	Chan Wing Hoong	29 April 1977 (aged 25)		(Malaysia) Perak
8	DF	Mohd Nizam Jamil	15 April 1980 (aged 22)		(Malaysia) Selangor
10	FW	Hairuddin Omar	29 September 1979 (aged 23)		(Malaysia) Terengganu
11	DF	Irwan Fadzli Idrus	2 June 1981 (aged 21)		(Malaysia) Kedah
12	DF	Kaironnisam Sahabudin Hussain	10 May 1979 (aged 23)		(Malaysia) Perlis
14	FW	Akmal Rizal Ahmad Rakhli	12 December 1981 (aged 21)		(Malaysia) Kedah
15	FW	Zainizam Marjan	11 May 1980 (aged 22)		(Malaysia) Sabah
16	MF	Tengku Hazman Raja Hassan (c)	6 March 1977 (aged 25)		(Malaysia) Selangor
17	MF	Muhammad Juzaili Samion	18 May 1981 (aged 21)		(Malaysia) Pahang
18	DF	Rosdi Talib	11 January 1976 (aged 26)		(Malaysia) Terengganu
19	MF	Mohd Fadzli Saari	1 January 1983 (aged 19)		(Malaysia) Pahang
20	FW	Mohd Nizaruddin Yusof	10 November 1979 (aged 23)		(Malaysia) Selangor
22	GK	Mohd Syamsuri Mustafa	6 February 1981 (aged 21)		(Malaysia) Terengganu
24	MF	K. Nanthakumar	13 October 1977 (aged 25)		(Malaysia) Perak

=== Thailand ===
Head coach: (England) Peter Withe

No.	Pos.	Player	Date of birth (age)	Caps	Club
1	GK	Kittisak Rawangpa	3 January 1975 (aged 27)		(Thailand) Sinthana
2	DF	Tanongsak Prajakkata	29 June 1976 (aged 26)		(Thailand) BEC Tero Sasana
3	DF	Peeratat Phoruendee	15 March 1979 (aged 23)		(Thailand) BEC Tero Sasana
4	DF	Vittaya Nabthong	25 April 1970 (aged 32)		(Thailand) BEC Tero Sasana
6	MF	Narongchai Vachiraban	16 February 1981 (aged 21)		(Thailand) Bangkok Christian College
7	DF	Chukiat Noosarung	25 June 1971 (aged 31)		(Vietnam) Hoàng Anh Gia Lai
8	MF	Therdsak Chaiman	29 September 1973 (aged 29)		(Thailand) BEC Tero Sasana
9	FW	Manit Noywech	5 March 1980 (aged 22)		(Thailand) Suphanburi
10	MF	Sakda Joemdee	7 April 1982 (aged 20)		(Thailand) Osotsapa
12	MF	Surachai Jaturapattarapong	20 November 1969 (aged 33)		(Singapore) Gombak United
13	FW	Kiatisuk Senamuang (c)	11 August 1973 (aged 29)		(Vietnam) Hoàng Anh Gia Lai
14	FW	Worrawoot Srimaka	8 December 1971 (aged 31)		(Thailand) BEC Tero Sasana
15	DF	Paitoon Tiepma	13 September 1981 (aged 21)		(Thailand) Osotsapa
16	MF	Issawa Singthong	7 October 1980 (aged 22)		(Thailand) Royal Thai Air Force
17	DF	Dusit Chalermsan	22 April 1970 (aged 32)		(Thailand) BEC Tero Sasana
21	DF	Jetsada Jitsawad	5 August 1980 (aged 22)		Thailand Tobacco Monopoly
22	GK	Pansa Meesatham	26 August 1974 (aged 28)		(Thailand) BEC Tero Sasana
23	FW	Sutee Suksomkit	5 June 1978 (aged 24)		(Singapore) Tanjong Pagar
24	MF	Tananchai Boriban	3 October 1972 (aged 30)		(Thailand) Sinthana
25	DF	Satid Mukkratok	7 January 1984 (aged 18)		(Thailand) BEC Tero Sasana

=== Singapore ===
Head coach: (Denmark) Jan Poulsen

No.	Pos.	Player	Date of birth (age)	Caps	Club
	GK	Shahril Jantan	20 April 1980 (aged 22)		Singapore Armed Forces
	GK	Adi Saleh	3 August 1976 (aged 26)		(Singapore) Home United
	DF	Razif Mahamud	11 October 1978 (aged 24)		Singapore Armed Forces
	DF	Aide Iskandar	28 May 1975 (aged 27)		(Singapore) Home United
	DF	Shunmugham Subramani	5 August 1972 (aged 30)		(Singapore) Home United
	DF	Arumugham Siva Kumar	4 September 1971 (aged 31)		(Singapore) Woodlands Wellington
	DF	Noh Rahman	2 August 1980 (aged 22)		Singapore Armed Forces
	DF	Daniel Bennett	7 January 1978 (aged 24)		(Wales) Wrexham
	DF	Nazri Nasir	17 January 1971 (aged 31)		(Singapore) Tampines Rovers
	DF	Rudy Khairon Daiman	4 July 1973 (aged 29)		(Singapore) Tanjong Pagar United
	MF	Zulkarnaen Zainal	1 October 1973 (aged 29)		(Singapore) Woodlands Wellington
	MF	Rafi Ali	11 December 1972 (aged 30)		(Singapore) Jurong
	MF	Goh Tat Chuan	6 February 1974 (aged 28)		(Singapore) Woodlands Wellington
	MF	Ahmad Latiff Khamaruddin	29 May 1979 (aged 23)		Singapore Armed Forces
	MF	Mohd Noor Ali	16 May 1975 (aged 27)		(Singapore) Geylang United
	MF	Azhar Baksin	26 November 1976 (aged 26)		(Singapore) Geylang United
	MF	Fadzuhasny Juraimi	3 September 1979 (aged 23)		(Singapore) Tanjong Pagar United
	FW	Egmar Goncalves	15 August 1970 (aged 32)		(Singapore) Home United
	FW	Noh Alam Shah	3 September 1980 (aged 22)		(Singapore) Sembawang Rangers
	FW	Indra Sahdan Daud	5 March 1979 (aged 23)		(Singapore) Home United

=== Laos ===
Head coach: Soutsakhone Oudomphet

No.	Pos.	Player	Date of birth (age)	Caps	Club
	GK	Siththalay Kanyavong	9 November 1984 (aged 18)		(Laos)
	GK	Vanhnasith Thilavongsa	21 May 1983 (aged 19)		(Laos)
	DF	Anan Thepsouvanh	21 October 1981 (aged 21)		(Laos)
	DF	Anousone Khothsombuth	24 March 1984 (aged 18)		(Laos)
	DF	Bounthavy Khampouvanh	5 October 1981 (aged 21)		(Laos)
	DF	Chalana Luang-Amath	10 May 1972 (aged 30)		(Laos) MCTPC FC
	DF	Sengphet Thongphachan	9 July 1987 (aged 15)		(Laos)
	DF	Souksavanh Phengsengsay	5 November 1985 (aged 17)		(Laos) National Public Security FC
	DF	Valasine Dalaphone	8 August 1984 (aged 18)		(Laos)
	DF	Vieng Aloune Bounthaiyavong	5 August 1979 (aged 23)		(Laos)
	DF	Vilayphone Xayavong	4 September 1973 (aged 29)		(Laos)
	MF	Chanthy Souksombuth	11 November 1984 (aged 18)		(Laos)
	MF	Nithsavong Khounphachan	13 October 1982 (aged 20)		(Laos)
	MF	Phayvanh Lounglath	8 March 1983 (aged 19)		(Laos)
	MF	Santiphap Phokasomboun			(Laos)
	MF	Souksakhone Vongsamany	3 February 1986 (aged 16)		(Laos)
	FW	Kholadeth Phonepachan	20 October 1980 (aged 22)		(Laos)
	FW	Phouvong Silyvong			(Laos)
	FW	Soubinh Keophet	20 January 1981 (aged 21)		(Laos)
	FW	Visay Phaphouvanin	12 June 1985 (aged 17)		(Thailand) Udon Thani
