= South Korea v Vietnam (2004 AFC Asian Cup qualification) =

South Korea vs Vietnam (2003)
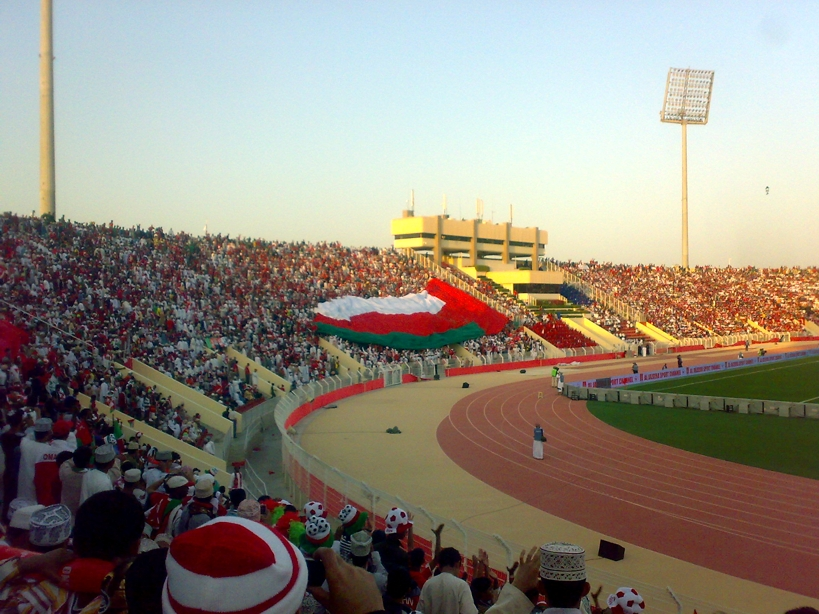
- Sultan Qaboos Sports Complex in Oman, where the match was held. (Photo taken in 2009)
- Event: 2004 AFC Asian Cup qualification
South Korea	Vietnam
(South Korea)	(Vietnam)
0	1
- Date: 19 October 2003; 22 years ago
- Venue: Sultan Qaboos Sports Complex, Muscat, Oman
- Referee: Panya Hanlumyaung (Thailand)
- Attendance: 25.000

On October 19, 2003, a match between the South Korea and Vietnam took place as part of the Group E return leg for the 2004 AFC Asian Cup qualifiers at the Sultan Qaboos Sports Complex in Muscat, Oman. Heading into the match, South Korea was highly favored, holding the prestige of a team that had recently finished fourth at the 2002 FIFA World Cup. In contrast, Vietnam utilized their U-23 squad as the core of the team to prepare for the upcoming Southeast Asian Games on home soil. However, Vietnam pulled off a massive upset by defeating South Korea 1–0, with the solitary goal scored by Pham Van Quyen.

Although Vietnam failed to qualify for the 2004 AFC Asian Cup by the end of the qualifying round, this victory sent shockwaves through public opinion at the time due to the vast difference in status between the two teams. To this day, it also remains the first and only time the Vietnamese national team has ever defeated South Korea at the senior international level.

== Pre-match ==
=== Ranking situation ===
Group E standings (after match 3)
Pos	Team	Pld	W	D	L	GF	GA	GD	Pts
1	South Korea	3	3	0	0	22	0	+22	9
2	Oman	3	2	0	1	13	1	+12	6
3	Vietnam	3	1	0	2	5	11	−6	3
4	Nepal	3	0	0	3	0	28	−28	0

Updated to match(es) played on 29 September 2003. Source:

In 2004, the AFC Asian Cup expanded its format to 16 participating teams for the first time. As a result, the qualifying round was designed to select the top two teams from each of the seven groups to join the defending champions, Japan, and the host nation, China, in the final tournament. The qualifying draw placed Vietnam and South Korea in Group E, alongside two other national teams: Oman and Nepal.

South Korea entered the Asian qualifiers as the fourth-place finishers of the 2002 FIFA World Cup, which they had co-hosted with Japan. In their history of Asian Cup appearances up to 2003, South Korea had twice claimed the top prize in the first two editions held in 1956 and 1960, and had finished as runners-up three times in 1972, 1980, and 1988. They also had two third-place finishes, once in 1964 and most recently in the 2000 edition. In the 2004 Asian Cup qualifiers, after the conclusion of the first leg, South Korea led Group E with a perfect record of three wins. At the 2004 qualification, South Korea ended the first leg in Incheon with 22 goals and 3 wons, including their biggest won of 16–0 in their history with Nepal.

On the other hand, Vietnam since reintegrating into the international tournament, they began participating in the Asian Cup qualifiers starting with the 1996 tournament but had never once reached the finals. According to assistant coach Nguyen Thanh Vinh, the Vietnamese sports sector had advocated for using the U-23 team to compete in the Asian Cup qualifiers to sharpen the squad in preparation for the 2003 SEA Games, which were to be held at home later that year. Following the first leg, Vietnam had secured one victory and suffered two losses, temporarily placing them third in Group E.

From 1991 until this match, Vietnam and South Korea had faced each other three times, all of which ended in victories for South Korea. In the 1996 qualifiers, South Korea defeated Vietnam 4–0 at Thống Nhất Stadium in Ho Chi Minh City, followed by another convincing 5–0 win during the 1998 Asian Games in Nakhon Sawan. In the first leg of the 2004 Asian Cup qualifiers held in Munhak Stadium in Incheon, South Korea—their most recent encounter prior to this game—the South Korean team had also secured a 5–0 victory.

== Match ==
The Vietnamese team, built around its U-23 core, fielded its strongest lineup—with the exception of Nguyen Minh Phuong, who was out due to a suspension—while the South Korean squad featured six players who had participated in the 2002 FIFA World Cup. Vietnam played a 4–4–2 formation, opting for a deep defensive strategy with a high density of players in their own half. From the opening whistle, South Korea dominated the match, employing a high-pressing style across the entire pitch. Capitalizing on their physical advantage, South Korea launched numerous attacks toward the Vietnamese goal but failed to convert, while Vietnamese goalkeeper Nguyen The Anh also delivered a stellar performance. Vietnam managed a few dangerous counter-attacks, including a situation where Phan Thanh Binh had a clear shot from 8 meters out, but his effort missed the target.

In the 73rd minute, South Korea orchestrated an attack from the right wing, but the ball was headed out of the penalty area by a Vietnamese defender. Immediately following this was a counter-attack by Vietnam: Le Quoc Vuong pushed the ball to Nguyen Tuan Phong on the right wing, who then sent the ball into the space between the goalkeeper and three high-pressing South Korean defenders. Pham Van Quyen sprinted forward, controlled the ball, and chipped it over goalkeeper Lee Woon-jae to open the scoring for Vietnam. According to Tuan Phong, South Korea hit the post and crossbar three or four times and registered ten shots before Van Quyen broke the deadlock. The 1–0 scoreline held until the final whistle, securing the victory for the Southeast Asian representatives.

=== Details ===
19 October 2003
20:15 UTC+4

South Korea	0–1	Vietnam
		Phạm Văn Quyến 74'

Sultan Qaboos Sports Complex, Muscat, Oman
Attendance: 25.000
Referee: Panya Hanlumyaung (Thailand)

South Korea	Vietnam

GK	1	Lee Woon-jae
DF	3	Hyun Young-min
DF	7	Kim Tae-young (c)
DF	15	Cho Sung-hwan
MF	5	Kim Nam-il
MF	2	Park Jin-sub	(substituted off) 46'
MF	12	Kim Jung-kyum
MF	14	Kim Jung-woo	(substituted off) 81'
FW	18	Cho Jae-jin	(substituted off) 53'
FW	19	Chung Kyung-ho
FW	22	Woo Sung-yong
Substitutions:
MF	13	Lee Eul-yong	(substituted on) 81'
FW	9	Kim Do-hoon	(substituted on) 53'
FW	11	Kim Dae-eui	(substituted on) 46'
Managers:
(Portugal) Humberto Coelho

GK	1	Nguyễn Thế Anh	(yellow card) 40'
DF	15	Phạm Hải Nam
DF	21	Vũ Như Thành (c)
DF	3	Nguyễn Huy Hoàng
DF	2	Lê Văn Trương
MF	6	Nguyễn Tuấn Phong		(substituted off) 74'
MF	14	Nguyễn Hữu Thắng	(yellow card) 50'
MF	20	Lê Quốc Vượng
MF	22	Phan Văn Tài Em		(substituted off) 86'
FW	10	Phạm Văn Quyến	(yellow card) 81'	(substituted off) 88'
FW	18	Phan Thanh Bình
Substitutions:
MF	5	Đặng Thanh Phương		(substituted on) 74'
MF	13	Cao Sỹ Cường		(substituted on) 86'
FW	19	Hoàng Phúc Lâm		(substituted on) 88'
Managers:
(Austria) Alfred Riedl

== Post-match ==
After match 4, the rankings of the teams in group E are as follows:

Group E standings (after match 4)
Pos	Team	Pld	W	D	L	GF	GA	GD	Pts
1	South Korea	4	3	0	1	22	1	+21	9
2	Oman	4	3	0	1	19	1	+18	9
3	Vietnam	4	2	0	2	6	11	−5	6
4	Nepal (E)	4	0	0	4	0	34	−34	0

Updated to match(es) played on 19 October 2003. Source:
(E) Eliminated

Match at the same time

--:-- UTC+4	Nepal	0–6	Oman	Muscat, Oman
			Fawzi Bashir 18', 62', 82'; Yousuf Shaaban 20'; Ahmed Hadid 44'; Hashim Saleh 78'

In the newspaper Tuổi Trẻ, Vietnam's head coach Alfred Riedl praised his players for "playing with a very good spirit" and a resilient style, while also emphasizing that the team "had been lucky" to secure the win. The match's sole goalscorer, Phạm Văn Quyến, described his goal against South Korea as "one of the most beautiful memories of my playing career." According to journalist Trương Anh Ngọc, he spoke with a South Korean assistant coach who appeared dismissive of Vietnam and had asserted that they would win by 4 or 5 goals. An official from the Korea Football Association (KFA) stated that the defeat reflected "complacency, or perhaps the coaching staff underestimated the Vietnamese team," and was "a disappointment to the people as well as to us."

The Yonhap news agency reported that "South Korea's status as the strongest team in Asia is wavering," describing the defeat as a "humiliation." Meanwhile, AFP journalists remarked that following the loss to Vietnam, South Korea "is still considered a top Asian team, but perhaps that will not last much longer." In Vietnam, the match continues to be revisited by domestic media using phrases like "the great victory" or an "Asian earthquake."

Despite the win, Vietnam failed to qualify for the 2004 AFC Asian Cup, finishing third in Group E with 9 points from 3 wins. South Korea finished second with 12 points and advanced to the finals alongside group leaders Oman (15 points). The Vietnam U-23 players later competed in the 22nd SEA Games on home soil but only secured a silver medal after losing to Thailand in extra time in the final. For his performances in 2003, goalscorer Văn Quyến was awarded the Vietnamese Golden Ball. After reaching the Asian Cup, the South Korean team was eliminated in the quarter-finals by Iran in Jinan, China.

The 2003 victory remains the only win for the Vietnam against the South Korea in seven encounters. A year after this match, Vietnam lost both legs to South Korea at Daejeon and Ho Chi Minh City in the 2006 World Cup qualifiers, and in their most recent meeting—a friendly at Suwon in 2023—South Korea defeated Vietnam 6–0. At the youth level, in 2026, Vietnam U-23 defeated South Korea U-23 on penalties after a draw over 120 minutes in the third-place match of the 2026 AFC U-23 Asian Cup in Jeddah; this marked the first victory for Vietnam over South Korea in 35 years.

== Similar cases ==
- China PR 1–2 Hong Kong (1985), the match cost China a place in the 1986 FIFA World Cup, and also sparked a riot at the match venue that forced police to intervene to restore order.
- Japan 2–2 Iraq (1993), although the two teams tied, the situation in their groups resulted in both teams failing to qualify for the 1994 FIFA World Cup, and also allowed Japan's arch-rivals, South Korea, to qualify. This match is also known by Japanese public opinion as the Agony in Doha (Japanese:ドーハの悲劇).
- Vietnam 2–0 United Arab Emirates (2007 AFC Asian Cup), this match shocked all of Asia at that time, because Vietnam was rated lower than its opponent, in addition, the 2007 AFC Asian Cup was the first tournament that Vietnam participated in as a unified country.
- Vietnam 3–1 China PR (2022 FIFA World Cup qualification).
- Malaysia 0–3 Saudi Arabia (2018 FIFA World Cup qualification).

== See also ==
- 2004 AFC Asian Cup qualification
