= North Bar (disambiguation) =

North Bar may refer to:

- North Bar, a bar situated in Leeds, England
- Beverley North Bar, a gate in the historic town walls of Beverley, East Riding of Yorkshire, England
- North Bar (club), football club in the Philippines for which Ali Go played
