= 2004 AFC Asian Cup qualification =

Tournament details
- Dates: 16 March 2003 – 3 December 2003
- Teams: 43 (from 1 confederation)

Tournament statistics
- Top scorer(s): (Iraq) Younis Mahmoud (South Korea) Kim Do-hoon (Saudi Arabia) Yusri Al Bashah (7 goals each)

The qualification process for the 2004 AFC Asian Cup football competition began in March 2003. Out of the 45 AFC members, only Cambodia and the Philippines failed to enter for the tournament. Both China, the hosts and Japan, the reigning champions automatically qualified for the finals. The lowest ranked 20 teams were placed in 6 preliminary qualifying groups of 3 and one group of 2, with the group winners joining the remaining 21 teams in 7 groups of 4. The top two of each of these groups qualified for the finals in China.

== First round ==
=== Group A ===
Pos	Team	Pld	W	D	L	GF	GA	GD	Pts	
1	Myanmar	2	2	0	0	7	0	+7	6	Qualifying round
2	Maldives (H)	2	0	1	1	1	3	−2	1	
3	Brunei	2	0	1	1	1	6	−5	1	

(H) Hosts
21 March 2003

Brunei	1–1	Maldives
Fadlin 59'		Ali Umar 42'

National Football Stadium, Malé

23 March 2003

Myanmar	5–0	Brunei
Win Htike 10'; Aung Kyaw Moe 14'; Yan Paing 45', 66'; Lwin Oo 75'

25 March 2003

Maldives	0–2	Myanmar
		Win Htike 52'; Zaw Zaw 65'

=== Group B ===
Team	Pld	W	D	L	GF	GA	GD	Pts
Sri Lanka	2	2	0	0	5	3	+2	6
Chinese Taipei	2	1	0	1	4	2	+2	3
Timor-Leste	2	0	0	2	2	6	−4	0

All matches played in Colombo, Sri Lanka

21 March 2003

Timor-Leste	2–3	Sri Lanka
Mohammad Hamza 3' (o.g.); F.J.G.R.M Cabral 81'		Kasun Jayasuriya 36'; Channa 44', 89'

23 March 2003

Chinese Taipei	3–0	Timor-Leste
H.C. Ming 7' 9'; C.J. Ming 33'

25 March 2003

Sri Lanka	2–1	Chinese Taipei
S.R. Kumara 13'; Channa 78'		Yen C.W. 47'

=== Group C ===
Team	Pld	W	D	L	GF	GA	GD	Pts
Nepal	2	1	0	1	4	2	+2	3
Kyrgyzstan	2	1	0	1	3	2	+1	3
Afghanistan	2	1	0	1	2	5	−3	3

All matches played in Kathmandu, Nepal

16 March 2003

Kyrgyzstan	1–2	Afghanistan
Zhumagulov 63'		Tahir Shah 25'; Farid Azami 76'

Dasarath Rangasala Stadium, Kathmandu, Nepal
Attendance: 1,000
Referee: Jehangir Khan (Pakistan)

18 March 2003

Afghanistan	0–4	Nepal
		Nirajan Rayamajhi 35'; Hari Khadka 39', 87'; Dipak Lama 90'

Dasarath Rangasala Stadium, Kathmandu, Nepal

20 March 2003

Nepal	0–2	Kyrgyzstan
		Pryanishnikov 27', 45'

Dasarath Rangasala Stadium, Kathmandu, Nepal
Attendance: 5,000
Referee: Rizwan Ul Haq (India)

=== Group D ===
Team	Pld	W	D	L	GF	GA	GD	Pts
Hong Kong	2	1	1	0	7	3	+4	4
Laos	2	1	0	1	3	6	−3	3
Bangladesh	2	0	1	1	3	4	−1	1

All matches played in Hong Kong

25 March 2003

Laos	1–5	Hong Kong
Visay Phaphouvanin 66'		Chan Chi Hong 17', 35'; Kwok Yue Hung 47'; Au Wai Lun 59' (pen.), 82'

27 March 2003

Bangladesh	1–2	Laos
Farhad 90+1'		Kholadeth Ponephachan 30'; Visay Phaphouvanin 37'

30 March 2003

Hong Kong	2–2	Bangladesh
Au Wai Lun 44' (pen.); Szeto Man Chun 45'		Firoj Mahmud Titu 66'; Mohammed Monwar Hossain 77'

=== Group E ===
Team	Pld	W	D	L	GF	GA	GD	Pts
Singapore	2	2	0	0	5	0	+5	6
Pakistan	2	1	0	1	3	3	0	3
Macau	2	0	0	2	0	5	−5	0

All matches played in Singapore

21 March 2003

Macau	0–3	Pakistan
		Qadeer Ahmed 27', 65'; Sarfraz Rasool 51'

23 March 2003

Singapore	2–0	Macau
Azhar Baksin 23'; Indra Sahdan Daud 58'

25 March 2003

Pakistan	0–3	Singapore
		Indra Sahdan Daud 8', 35'; Mohd Noh Alam Shah 66'

=== Group F ===
Team	Pld	W	D	L	GF	GA	GD	Pts
Bhutan	2	1	1	0	6	0	+6	4
Mongolia	2	1	1	0	5	0	+5	4
Guam	2	0	0	2	0	11	−11	0

All matches played in Thimphu, Bhutan

23 April 2003

Guam	0–6	Bhutan
		Wangay Dorji 32', 35'; Dinesh Chhetri 59'; Passang Tshering 76' (pen.); Pema Chopel 88'; Yeshey Nedup 89'

25 April 2003

Mongolia	5–0	Guam
Ganbat Bat-Yalalt 20'; Ganbaataryn Tögsbayar 26', 56', 90'; Donorovyn Lümbengarav 61'

27 April 2003

Bhutan	0–0	Mongolia

=== Group G ===
Team	Pld	W	D	L	GF	GA	GD	Pts
North Korea	2	1	1	0	3	1	+2	4
India	2	0	1	1	1	3	−2	1

24 March 2003

North Korea	2–0	India
Choe So-hyok 44', 70'

Pyongyang, North Korea

30 March 2003

India	1–1	North Korea
I.M. Vijayan 29'		Choe Hyun-yu 85'

Margao, India

== Second round ==
=== Group A ===
Team	Pld	W	D	L	GF	GA	GD	Pts
Uzbekistan	6	4	1	1	13	6	+7	13
Thailand	6	3	0	3	10	7	+3	9
Tajikistan	6	2	2	2	3	5	−2	8
Hong Kong	6	1	1	4	3	11	−8	4

Played in Tashkent, Uzbekistan.

6 November 2003

Tajikistan	1–0	Thailand
Fuzailov 79'

6 November 2003
18:00

Uzbekistan	4–1	Hong Kong
Akopyants 1'; Shishelov 17', 67'; Soliev 28'		Law Chun Bong 45'

Pakhtakor Stadium, Tashkent, Uzbekistan
Referee: Suresh Srinivasan (India)

8 November 2003

Hong Kong	0–0	Tajikistan

8 November 2003
18:00

Thailand	0–3	Uzbekistan
		Shatskikh 23'; Shishelov 27', 70'

Pakhtakor Stadium, Tashkent, Uzbekistan
Referee: Moghaddam Rahimi (Iran)

10 November 2003

Hong Kong	2–1	Thailand
Cheung Sai Ho 28'; Wong Chun Yue 69'		Datsakorn Thonglao 64'

10 November 2003
18:00

Uzbekistan	0–0	Tajikistan

Pakhtakor Stadium, Tashkent, Uzbekistan
Attendance: 16,000
Referee: Salah Amim Mohammed (UAE)

Played in Bangkok, Thailand.

17 November 2003

Thailand	4–0	Hong Kong
Noywech 24'; Thonglao 35'; Chaikamdee 79', 88' (pen.)

17 November 2003
20:00

Uzbekistan	4–1	Tajikistan
Shishelov 8', 36'; Kapadze 50'; Koshelev 61'		Burkhanov 65'

Rajamangala Stadium, Bangkok, Thailand

19 November 2003

Tajikistan	0–1	Thailand
		Chaiman 83'

19 November 2003
20:00

Hong Kong	0–1	Uzbekistan
		Shirshov 32'

Rajamangala Stadium, Bangkok, Thailand

21 November 2003

Hong Kong	0–1	Tajikistan
		Muhidinov 68'

21 November 2003
17:00

Thailand	4–1	Uzbekistan
Noywech 38'; Surasiang 56'; Thongman 78'; Chaikamdee 81'		Koshelev 88'

Rajamangala Stadium, Bangkok, Thailand
Attendance: 25,000

=== Group B ===
Team	Pld	W	D	L	GF	GA	GD	Pts
Kuwait	6	5	1	0	17	5	+12	16
Qatar	6	3	2	1	10	6	+4	11
Singapore	6	1	1	4	3	11	−8	4
Palestine	6	0	2	4	3	11	−8	2

NB: All Palestine's home matches played away.

4 September 2003

Singapore	1–3	Kuwait
Goncalves 50'		Neda 10'; Al-Mutawa 67', 90'

National Stadium, Singapore
Attendance: 10,500

14 September 2003

Kuwait	2–1	Qatar
Abdullah 56'; Wabran 85'		Al-Ghanem 27'

Mohammed al-Hamad Stadium, Hawalli, Kuwait
Attendance: 20,000

20 September 2003

Qatar	2–2	Kuwait
Bechir 21', 82'		Redha 26'; Al Ateeqi 71'

Doha, Qatar

24 September 2003

Palestine	1–1	Qatar
Mansour 90'		Abdullah 47'

Doha, Qatar

27 September 2003

Kuwait	4–0	Singapore
Abdullah 25', 78'; Al-Mutawa 47'; Abdulreda 53'

27 September 2003

Qatar	2–1	Palestine
Mohyeddin 68'; Hamzah 90'		Abdala 77'

Doha, Qatar

5 October 2003

Kuwait	2–1	Palestine
Wabran 25'; Al-Mutawa 59'		Amer 72'

Mohammed Al-Hamad Stadium, Hawalli, Kuwait
Referee: Abdullah Al-Harasi (Oman)

8 October 2003

Palestine	0–4	Kuwait
		Abdullah 36', 57' (pen.); Al-Mutawa 42', 46'

Mohammed Al-Hamad Stadium, Hawalli, Kuwait
Referee: Muslim Al-Boloushi (UAE)

19 October 2003

Singapore	2–0	Palestine
Juraimi 18'; Alam Shah 88'

Jalan Besar Stadium, Singapore
Attendance: 2,787
Referee: Sarkar Subrata (India)

22 October 2003

Palestine	0–0	Singapore

Jalan Besar Stadium, Singapore
Attendance: 3,076
Referee: Anura de Silva (Sri Lanka)

19 November 2003

Qatar	2–0	Singapore
Bechir 10'; Mustafa 28'

Doha, Qatar

29 November 2003

Singapore	0–2	Qatar
		Koni 42'; Bechir 55'

=== Group C ===
Team	Pld	W	D	L	GF	GA	GD	Pts
Saudi Arabia	6	6	0	0	31	1	+30	18
Indonesia	6	3	1	2	9	13	−4	10
Yemen	6	2	1	3	15	15	0	7
Bhutan	6	0	0	6	0	26	−26	0

Played in Jeddah, Saudi Arabia.

6 October 2003

Saudi Arabia	7–0	Yemen
Yusri Al Bashah 16', 18', 24', 35'; Mohammed Noor 65'; Mohammad Al-Shalhoub 73' (pen.); Talal Al-Meshal 80'	Report

Prince Abdullah Al Faisal Stadium, Jeddah
Referee: Basel Al-Hajjar (Syria)
6 October 2003

Indonesia	2–0	Bhutan
Kurniawan Dwi Yulianto 4'; Zaenal Arif 14'

Prince Abdullah Al Faisal Stadium, Jeddah

8 October 2003

Yemen	0–3	Indonesia
		Uston Nawawi 51', 89'; Zaenal Arif 70'

Prince Abdullah Al Faisal Stadium, Jeddah
8 October 2003

Saudi Arabia	6–0	Bhutan
Yusri Al Bashah 43'; Abdullah Jumaa 49', 67'; Yasser Al-Qahtani 70'; Abdulaziz Al-Janoubi 73'; Said Wadaani 90'	Report

Prince Abdullah Al Faisal Stadium, Jeddah

10 October 2003

Saudi Arabia	5–0	Indonesia
Talal Al-Meshal 38', 55', 56'; Yusri Al Bashah 47', 49'	Report

Prince Abdullah Al Faisal Stadium, Jeddah
Referee: Mohamad Mansour (Lebanon)
10 October 2003

Bhutan	0–8	Yemen
		Yasir Bashi 20', 25', 82'; Fikri Al-Habibshi 35'; Saled Al-Shiri 59'; Adel Al-Salemi 67', 88'; Nashwan Aziz 74'

Prince Abdullah Al Faisal Stadium, Jeddah

13 October 2003

Yemen	1–3	Saudi Arabia
Yasir Bashi 12'	Report	Hamad Al-Montashari 18'; Abdullah Al-Waked 20'; Mohammad Al-Shalhoub 82' (pen.)

Prince Abdullah Al Faisal Stadium, Jeddah
Referee: Mohamad Mansour (Lebanon)
13 October 2003

Bhutan	0–2	Indonesia
		Eduard Ivakdalam 19'; Zaenal Arif 33'

Prince Abdullah Al Faisal Stadium, Jeddah

15 October 2003

Indonesia	2–2	Yemen
Eduard Ivakdalam 12' (pen.), 38'		Adel Al-Salimi 1' (pen.); Ali Al-Amki 56'

Prince Abdullah Al Faisal Stadium, Jeddah
15 October 2003

Bhutan	0–4	Saudi Arabia
	Report	Abdullah Jumaa 3', 24', 80'; Bandar Temim 44' (pen.)

Prince Abdullah Al Faisal Stadium, Jeddah
Referee: Jaafaar Mahdi Al-Khabbaz (Bahrain)

17 October 2003

Indonesia	0–6	Saudi Arabia
	Report	Talal Al-Meshal 21', 86'; Mohammad Al-Shalhoub 45'; Mohammed Noor 58'; Ahmed Al-Dosary 87'; Abdulaziz Al-Janoubi 89'

Prince Abdullah Al Faisal Stadium, Jeddah
Referee: Nail Lutfullin (Uzbekistan)
17 October 2003

Yemen	4–0	Bhutan
Nashwan Al-Jajjam 3', 20'; Ali Al-Amki 33'; Adel Al-Salimi 81'

Prince Abdullah Al Faisal Stadium, Jeddah

=== Group D ===
Team	Pld	W	D	L	GF	GA	GD	Pts
Iran	6	5	0	1	16	5	+11	15
Jordan	6	5	0	1	13	6	+7	15
Lebanon	6	1	1	4	2	8	−6	4
North Korea	6	0	1	5	2	14	−12	1

4 September 2003

North Korea	0–1	Lebanon
		Buddy Farah 56'

Pyongyang, North Korea
Attendance: 95,000

5 September 2003

Iran	4–1	Jordan
Ali Daei 45', 90'; Nekounam 75'; Mobali 80'		Mo'ayyad Salim 2'

Azadi Stadium, Tehran, Iran

26 September 2003

Jordan	3–2	Iran
Mo'ayyad Salim 41'; Shelbaieh 45'; Al-Shaqran 81'		Golmohammadi 6'; Majidi 59'

Al Hussain Stadium, Amman, Jordan

17 October 2003

Jordan	1–0	Lebanon
Hatem Aqel 8' (pen.)

Amman, Jordan

27 October 2003
15:00

North Korea	1–3	Iran
Myong Song-Chol 61'		Karimi 47', 79'; Navidkia 87'

Kim Il-Sung Stadium, Pyongyang, North Korea
Attendance: 30,000
Referee: Qassim Shaaban (Kuwait)

3 November 2003^{1}

Lebanon	1–1	North Korea
Khaled Hamieh 59'		Kim Yong-chol 62'

Beirut, Lebanon

12 November 2003

Lebanon	0–2	Jordan
		Hassouneh Al-Sheikh 37'; Al-Shaqran 65'

Beirut, Lebanon

12 November 2003
17:30

Iran	Abandoned 3–0 (Awarded)^{2}	North Korea
Daei 52' (pen.)

Azadi Stadium, Tehran, Iran
Attendance: 40,000
Referee: Khader Haj Khader (Syria)

18 November 2003

Jordan	3–0	North Korea
Shelbaieh 7'; Al-Shboul 89'; Anas Al-Zboun 90'

Amman, Jordan

19 November 2003

Lebanon	0–3	Iran
		Ali Daei 38' (pen.); Golmohammadi 61'; Nikbakht 80'

Sports City Stadium, Beirut, Lebanon

28 November 2003

Iran	1–0	Lebanon
Ali Daei 27'

Azadi Stadium, Tehran, Iran

28 November 2003

North Korea	Canceled 0–3 (Awarded)^{3}	Jordan

Pyongyang, North Korea

^{1} The match was originally scheduled to be held on September 27, 2003, but was postponed to the following week as the North Korean team failed to arrive in Lebanon due to a traffic accident in Pyongyang.

^{2} The match was abandoned in the 60th minute with Iran leading 1-0 after North Korea walked off when Iranian fans threw firecrackers on the pitch and refused to continue. The match was awarded 3–0 to Iran, but Iran were also ordered to play their next home match in an official AFC or FIFA competition behind closed doors.

^{3} The match was not played as North Korean immigration officials did not issue the Jordanian team visas, meaning they were refused entry into the country. The match was awarded 3–0 to Jordan, while North Korea were banned from AFC competitions for a year and from qualifying for the 2007 Asian Cup.

=== Group E ===
Team	Pld	W	D	L	GF	GA	GD	Pts
Oman	6	5	0	1	24	2	+22	15
South Korea	6	4	0	2	30	4	+26	12
Vietnam	6	3	0	3	8	13	−5	9
Nepal	6	0	0	6	0	43	−43	0

Played in Incheon and Daegu, Korea Republic.

25 September 2003

Nepal	0–7	Oman
		Fawzi Bashir 2', 25'; Ahmed Hadid 4', 12'; Hassan Mudhafar 6'; Badar Al-Maimani 51'; Hani Al-Dhabit 59'

Munhak Stadium, Incheon, South Korea

25 September 2003

Vietnam	0–5	South Korea
		Lee Ki-hyung 35'; Cho Jae-jin 49'; Kim Do-hoon 68'; Kim Dae-eui 72'; Woo Sung-yong 86'

Munhak Stadium, Incheon, South Korea
Attendance: 14,327
Referee: Subash Anthony Lazar (Singapore)

27 September 2003

Vietnam	5–0	Nepal
Pham Van Quyen 14', 23', 36'; Nguyen Tuan Phong 22'; Phan Thanh Binh 90'

World Cup Stadium, Daegu, South Korea

27 September 2003

South Korea	1–0	Oman
Choi Sung-kuk 46'

Munhak Stadium, Incheon, Korea Republic
Attendance: 18,750
Referee: Masayoshi Okada (Japan)

29 September 2003

Oman	6–0	Vietnam
Bashir 15', 43'; Al-Dhabit 16', 27'; Al-Mukhaini 20'; Al-Hinai 87'

World Cup Stadium, Daegu, South Korea

29 September 2003

South Korea	16–0	Nepal
Kim Dae-eui 18', 37'; Woo Sung-yong 21', 46', 48'; Park Jin-sub 22', 28', 64', 67', 89'; Lee Eul-yong 54'; Lee Kwan-woo 57'; Kim Do-hoon 75', 84', 86'; Chung Kyung-ho 80'

Munhak Stadium, Incheon, Korea Republic
Attendance: 6,521
Referee: Masayoshi Okada (Japan)

Played in Muscat, Oman.

19 October 2003

Nepal	0–6	Oman
		Fawzi Bashir 18', 62', 82'; Yousuf Shaaban 20'; Ahmed Hadid 44'; Hashim Saleh 78'

19 October 2003

South Korea	0–1	Vietnam
		Pham Van Quyen 74'

Sultan Qaboos Sports Complex, Muscat, Oman
Attendance: 25,000
Referee: Panya Hanlumyaung (Thailand)

21 October 2003

Vietnam	2–0	Nepal
Nguyen Minh Phuong 49'; Phan Thanh Binh 50'

21 October 2003

Oman	3–1	South Korea
Hani Al-Dhabit 60'; Hashim Saleh 64'; Fawzi Bashir 88'		Chung Kyung-ho 49'; Woo Sung-yong (red card) 91'

Sultan Qaboos Sports Complex, Muscat, Oman
Attendance: 22,000

24 October 2003

South Korea	7–0	Nepal
Cho Jae-jin 1'; Lee Ki-hyung 5', 51'; Kim Do-hoon 15' (pen.), 31', 33'; Chung Kyung-ho 51'

Royal Oman Police Stadium, Muscat, Oman
Attendance: 100

24 October 2003

Oman	2–0	Vietnam
Al-Dhabit 47'; Ahmed Hadid 68'

=== Group F ===
Team	Pld	W	D	L	GF	GA	GD	Pts
Iraq	6	4	1	1	16	4	+12	13
Bahrain	6	4	1	1	14	9	+5	13
Malaysia	6	1	2	3	9	12	−3	5
Myanmar	6	1	0	5	4	18	−14	3

Played in Kuala Lumpur, Malaysia.

8 October 2003

Iraq	5–1	Bahrain
Mahmoud 5', 48', 69', 83'; Swadi 25'		Saleh Farhan 71'

Bukit Jalil Stadium, Kuala Lumpur
Attendance: 350
Referee: Kazuhiko Matsumura (Japan)

8 October 2003

Malaysia	4–0	Myanmar
Tengku Hazman 34', 80'; Gilbert Cassidy 67'; Tun Lin Soe 86' (o.g.)

Bukit Jalil Stadium, Kuala Lumpur
Attendance: 5,500
Referee: Yang Ziqiang (China)

10 October 2003

Myanmar	1–3	Bahrain
Soe Myat Min 77'		Talal Yousef 14'; A'ala Hubail 49'; Hussain Ali Ahmed 76'

Bukit Jalil Stadium, Kuala Lumpur
Attendance: 800
Referee: Santhan Nagalingam (Singapore)

10 October 2003

Malaysia	0–0	Iraq

Bukit Jalil Stadium, Kuala Lumpur
Attendance: 8,500
Referee: Khantama Adunyachart (Thailand)

12 October 2003

Iraq	3–0	Myanmar
Obeid 39'; Mnajed 50'; Mohammed 86'

Bukit Jalil Stadium, Kuala Lumpur
Attendance: 500
Referee: Yang Ziqiang (China)

12 October 2003

Malaysia	2–2	Bahrain
Shukor Adan 80'; Norhafiz Zamani Misbah 90'		Sayed Mahmood Jalal 6'; Mohammed Husain Bahzad 45'

Bukit Jalil Stadium, Kuala Lumpur
Attendance: 8,000
Referee: Kazuhiko Matsumura (Japan)

Played in Manama, Bahrain.

20 October 2003

Iraq	5–1	Malaysia
Hashim 20'; Mahmoud 36', 45', 63'; Fawzi 70'		Hairuddin Omar 53'

Bahrain National Stadium, Manama
Attendance: 500
Referee: Mohammed Omar Al-Saeedi (UAE)

20 October 2003

Bahrain	4–0	Myanmar
Abdulla Al Marzooqi 22'; Hussain Ali Ahmed 27'; Sayed Mahmood Jalal 45'; Saleh Farhan 45+2' (pen.)

Bahrain National Stadium, Manama
Attendance: 8,000
Referee: Abdullah Al-Harrasi (Oman)

22 October 2003

Myanmar	1–3	Iraq
Zaw Zaw 45'		Hassan 38'; Rahim 66'; Swadi 89' (pen.)

Bahrain National Stadium, Manama
Attendance: 300
Referee: Farajollah Yasrebi (Iran)

22 October 2003

Bahrain	3–1	Malaysia
Hussain Ali Ahmed 30', 45'; Talal Yousef 43' (pen.)		Indra Putra Mahayuddin 37'

Bahrain National Stadium, Manama
Attendance: 9,000
Referee: Talat Najm (Lebanon)

24 October 2003

Myanmar	2–1	Malaysia
Soe Myat Min 25'; Fadzli Saari 43' (o.g.)		Hairuddin Omar 86'

Bahrain National Stadium, Manama
Attendance: 1,000
Referee: Abdullah Al-Harrasi (Oman)

24 October 2003

Bahrain	1–0	Iraq
A'ala Hubail 12'

Bahrain National Stadium, Manama
Attendance: 17,000
Referee: Mohammed Omar Al-Saaedi (UAE)

=== Group G ===
Team	Pld	W	D	L	GF	GA	GD	Pts
Turkmenistan	6	4	2	0	10	2	+8	14
United Arab Emirates	6	4	1	1	13	5	+8	13
Syria	6	2	1	3	16	10	+6	7
Sri Lanka	6	0	0	6	1	23	−22	0

NB: All of Sri Lanka's home matches were played away.

15 October 2003

Syria	5–0	Sri Lanka
Iyad Mando 34', 82'; Maher Al-Sayed 54', 84'; Firas Al-Khatib 73'

Damascus, Syria

18 October 2003

Sri Lanka	0–8	Syria
		Firas Al-Khatib 40', 49', 55'; Maher Al-Sayed 45', 65'; Iyad Mando 60'; Nabil Al Shahmeh 80', 83'

Damascus, Syria

19 October 2003

Turkmenistan	1–0	United Arab Emirates
Vladimir Bayramov 43'

Ashgabat, Turkmenistan

30 October 2003

United Arab Emirates	1–1	Turkmenistan
Ismail Matar 58'		Nazar Bayramov 41'

Sharjah, United Arab Emirates

7 November 2003

Syria	1–3	United Arab Emirates
Firas Al-Khatib 50'		Rami Yaslam 74'; Mohammed Srour 80'; Abdulrahim Jumaa 89'

Damascus, Syria

9 November 2003

Turkmenistan	1–0	Sri Lanka
Agabayew 9'

Balkanabat, Turkmenistan

12 November 2003

Sri Lanka	0–3	Turkmenistan

Ashgabat, Turkmenistan

14 November 2003

United Arab Emirates	3–1	Syria
Rami Yaslam 45'; Mohammad Omar 63'; Sultan Rashed 78'		Raja Rafe 36'

Sharjah, United Arab Emirates

18 November 2003

United Arab Emirates	3–1	Sri Lanka
Mohammad Omar 11' (pen.); Subait Khater 40'; Ismail Matar 61'		Channa 31'

Dubai, United Arab Emirates

22 November 2003

Sri Lanka	0–3	United Arab Emirates
		Abdulrahim Jumaa 45+2', 79'; Mohammad Omar 87'

Dubai, United Arab Emirates

28 November 2003

Syria	1–1	Turkmenistan
Anas Sari 10'		Urazow 16'

Aleppo, Syria

3 December 2003

Turkmenistan	3–0^{1}	Syria

Ashgabat, Turkmenistan

^{1} Syria failed to show up for the match. The match was awarded 3–0 to Turkmenistan.

== Qualified teams ==
Country	Qualified as	Date qualification was secured	Previous appearances in tournament^{1, 2}
China	Hosts	28 October 2000	7 (1976, 1980, 1984, 1988, 1992, 1996, 2000)
Japan	2000 AFC Asian Cup winners	26 October 2000	4 (1988, **1992**, 1996, **2000**)
Kuwait	Qualifying round Group B winners	5 October 2003	7 (1972, 1976, **1980**, 1984, 1988, 1996, 2000)
Saudi Arabia	Qualifying round Group C winners	15 October 2003	5 (**1984**, **1988**, 1992, **1996**, 2000)
Indonesia	Qualifying round Group C runners-up	15 October 2003	2 (1996, 2000)
Oman	Qualifying round Group E winners	21 October 2003	0 (Debut)
Iraq	Qualifying round Group F winners	22 October 2003	4 (1972, 1976, 1996, 2000)
Bahrain	Qualifying round Group F runners-up	22 October 2003	1 (1988)
South Korea	Qualifying round Group E runners-up	24 October 2003	9 (**1956**, **1960**, 1964, 1972, 1980, 1984, 1988, 1996, 2000)
Jordan	Qualifying round Group D runners-up	18 November 2003	0 (Debut)
United Arab Emirates	Qualifying round Group G runners-up	18 November 2003	5 (1980, 1984, 1988, 1992, 1996)
Uzbekistan	Qualifying round Group A winners	19 November 2003	2 (1996, 2000)
Qatar	Qualifying round Group B runners-up	19 November 2003	5 (1980, 1984, 1988, 1992, 2000)
Iran	Qualifying round Group D winners	19 November 2003	9 (**1968**, **1972**, **1976**, 1980, 1984, 1988, 1992, 1996, 2000)
Thailand	Qualifying round Group A runners-up	21 November 2003	4 (1972, 1992, 1996, 2000)
Turkmenistan	Qualifying round Group G winners	28 November 2003	0 (Debut)

Notes:

^{1} Bold indicates champion for that year
^{2} Italic indicates host
