= 2002 AFF Championship =

Kejuaraan Sepak Bola ASEAN 2002 2002 東盟足球錦標賽 2002 ஏசியான் கால்ப கோப்பை Kejohanan Bola Sepak ASEAN 2002

Tournament details
- Host countries: Indonesia (group stage and knockout stage); Singapore (for group stage)
- Dates: 15–29 December
- Teams: 9
- Venues: 4 (in 3 host cities)

Final positions
- Champions: Thailand (3rd title)
- Runners-up: Indonesia
- Third place: Vietnam
- Fourth place: Malaysia

Tournament statistics
- Matches played: 20
- Goals scored: 92 (4.6 per match)
- Top scorer(s): (Indonesia) Bambang Pamungkas (8 goals)
- Best player: (Thailand) Therdsak Chaiman

The 2002 AFF Championship, officially known as the 2002 Tiger Cup, was co-hosted by Indonesia and Singapore from 15 to 29 December 2002 and participated by all national teams of the member associations of the ASEAN Football Federation entered except for Brunei. The championship started off with group matches, where the top two teams from each group advanced to the semi-finals and the final.

In the final match between Thailand and Indonesia, Thailand took a 2–0 lead against hosts Indonesia by the end of the first half. However, the Indonesians battled back to level the score and force the game into a penalty shootout, which was won 4–2 by the Thais.

== Venues ==
(Indonesia) Jakarta		Singapore	
Gelora Bung Karno Stadium	Lebak Bulus Stadium	National Stadium	Bishan Stadium
Capacity: 110,000	Capacity: 12,500	Capacity: 55,000	Capacity: 3,500
2002 AFF Championship is located in Southeast Asia

== Group stage ==
=== Group A ===
- Times are Western Indonesian Time / (Indonesian: Waktu Indonesia Barat)(WIB) – UTC+7
- All matches played in Jakarta, Indonesia

Team	Pld	W	D	L	GF	GA	GD	Pts
Vietnam	4	3	1	0	19	7	+12	10
Indonesia (H)	4	2	2	0	19	5	+14	8
Myanmar	4	2	1	1	13	5	+8	7
Cambodia	4	1	0	3	5	18	−13	3
Philippines	4	0	0	4	3	24	−21	0

15 December 2002
17:05

Indonesia	0–0	Myanmar

Gelora Bung Karno Stadium, Jakarta
Attendance: 40,000
Referee: Abdulhameed Ibrahim (Bahrain)

15 December 2002
19:35

Vietnam	9–2	Cambodia
Huỳnh Hồng Sơn 11'; Trần Trường Giang 16', 40'; Nguyễn Quốc Trung 24'; Lê Huỳnh Đức 63', 80'; Nguyễn Minh Phương 75'; Trịnh Xuân Thành 88'; Phạm Văn Quyến 90'		Sochetra 30'; Kanyanith 58'

Gelora Bung Karno Stadium, Jakarta
Referee: Santhan Nagalingham (Singapore)

17 December 2002
16:05

Philippines	1–6	Myanmar
Gonzalez 81'		A. K. Moe 18', 52'; Zaw Htaik 35'; S. L. Tun 45'; Zaw Zaw 56'; T. N. Tun Thein 63'

Gelora Bung Karno Stadium, Jakarta
Referee: Subkhiddin Mohd Salleh (Malaysia)

17 December 2002
18:35

Cambodia	2–4	Indonesia
Sochetra 15', 45'		Zaenal 35'; Bambang 58', 79', 80'

Gelora Bung Karno Stadium, Jakarta
Attendance: 20,000
Referee: Khanthachai Virat (Thailand)

19 December 2002
16:05

Myanmar	5–0	Cambodia
Zaw Zaw 47'; Lwin Oo 57', 77'; Zaw Htaik 69'; T. N. Tun Thein 83'

Gelora Bung Karno Stadium, Jakarta
Referee: Abdulhameed Ibrahim (Bahrain)

19 December 2002
18:35

Vietnam	4–1	Philippines
Huỳnh Hồng Sơn 60', 72'; Lê Huỳnh Đức 68' (pen.), 79'		Cañedo 71'

Gelora Bung Karno Stadium, Jakarta
Referee: Santhan Nagalingham (Singapore)

21 December 2002
16:05

Cambodia	1–0	Philippines
Kanyanith 90'

Gelora Bung Karno Stadium, Jakarta
Referee: Jimmy Napitupulu (Indonesia)

21 December 2002
18:35

Indonesia	2–2	Vietnam
Budi 12'; Zaenal 83'		Phan Văn Tài Em 53'; Lê Huỳnh Đức 59'

Gelora Bung Karno Stadium, Jakarta
Attendance: 30,000
Referee: Subkhiddin Mohd Salleh (Malaysia)

23 December 2002
18:35

Myanmar	2–4	Vietnam
Lwin Oo 30'; Htay Aung 80'		Trịnh Xuân Thành 38'; Đặng Phương Nam 48', 66'; Lê Huỳnh Đức 72' (pen.)

Lebak Bulus Stadium, Jakarta
Referee: Santhan Nagalingham (Singapore)

23 December 2002
18:35

Philippines	1–13	Indonesia
Go 78'		Bambang 1', 29', 35', 82'; Zaenal 6', 38', 41', 57'; Budi 16'; Sugiantoro 55', 75'; Imran 81'; Licuanan 88' (o.g.)

Gelora Bung Karno Stadium, Jakarta
Attendance: 50,340
Referee: Khanthachai Virat (Thailand)

==== Group B ====
- Times are Singapore Standard Time (SST) – UTC+8
- All matches played in Singapore

Team	Pld	W	D	L	GF	GA	GD	Pts
Malaysia	3	2	1	0	8	2	+6	7
Thailand	3	1	1	1	7	5	+2	4
Singapore (H)	3	1	1	1	3	6	−3	4
Laos	3	0	1	2	3	8	−5	1

18 December 2002
17:35

Thailand	5–1	Laos
Worrawoot 1', 24'; Kiatisuk 8', 83', 90'		Phaphouvanin 66'

National Stadium, Kallang
Referee: Vijay Rahman (Singapore)

18 December 2002
20:05

Singapore	0–4	Malaysia
		Rizal 30'; Indra 49', 65'; Nizaruddin 69'

National Stadium, Kallang
Attendance: 45,000
Referee: Lee Young-chun (Korea Republic)

20 December 2002
17:35

Malaysia	3–1	Thailand
Rizal 45'; Hazman 66'; Indra 86'		Therdsak 23'

National Stadium, Kallang
Referee: Luong The Tai (Vietnam)

20 December 2002
20:05

Singapore	2–1	Laos
Alam Shah 6'; Noor Ali 52'		Phaphouvanin 19'

National Stadium, Kallang
Referee: Midi Nitrorejo Setiyono (Indonesia)

22 December 2002
19:35

Malaysia	1–1	Laos
Nizam 27' (pen.)		Phaphouvanin 29'

Bishan Stadium, Bishan
Referee: Lee Young-chun (Korea Republic)

22 December 2002
19:35

Singapore	1–1	Thailand
Noor Ali 44'		Woorawoot 15'

National Stadium, Kallang
Attendance: 20,000
Referee: Jerry Andres (Philippines)

== Knockout stage ==
- Times are Western Indonesian Time (WIT) – UTC+7
- All matches played in Jakarta, Indonesia

=== Bracket ===
Semi-finals
27 December
Vietnam	0
Thailand	4
27 December
Malaysia	0
Indonesia	1

Final
29 December
Thailand (p)	2 (4)
Indonesia	2 (2)
Third place
29 December
Vietnam	2
Malaysia	1

=== Semi-finals ===
27 December 2002
16:00

Vietnam	0–4	Thailand
		Woorawoot 24'; Narongchai 42'; Manit 75'; Sakda 90'

Gelora Bung Karno Stadium, Jakarta
Referee: Santhan Nagalingham (Singapore)

27 December 2002
19:00

Malaysia	0–1	Indonesia
		Bambang 75'

Gelora Bung Karno Stadium, Jakarta
Attendance: 50,000
Referee: Abdulhameed Ibrahim (Bahrain)

=== Third place play-off ===
29 December 2002
16:00

Vietnam	2–1	Malaysia
Trần Trường Giang 45'; Nguyễn Minh Phương 59'		Indra 55'

Gelora Bung Karno Stadium, Jakarta
Referee: Setiyono Midi (Indonesia)

=== Final ===
29 December 2002
19:00

Thailand	2–2 (a.e.t.)	Indonesia
Chukiat 26'; Therdsak 38'	Report	Yaris 46'; Gendut 79'
Penalties
Kiatisuk (penalty missed); Sakda (penalty scored); Therdsak (penalty scored); Manit (penalty scored); Dusit (penalty scored)	4–2	(penalty scored) Bambang; (penalty missed) Sugiantoro; (penalty missed) Firmansyah; (penalty scored) Imran

Gelora Bung Karno Stadium, Jakarta
Attendance: 100,000
Referee: Subkhiddin Mohd Salleh (Malaysia)

== Awards ==
2002 AFF Championship

Thailand
Third title

Most Valuable Player	Golden Boot
(Thailand) Therdsak Chaiman	(Indonesia) Bambang Pamungkas

== Goalscorers ==
8 goals

- (Indonesia) Bambang Pamungkas

6 goals

- (Indonesia) Zaenal Arif
- (Vietnam) Lê Huỳnh Đức

4 goals

- (Malaysia) Indra Putra Mahayuddin
- (Thailand) Worrawoot Srimaka

3 goals

- (Cambodia) Hok Sochetra
- (Laos) Visay Phaphouvanin
- (Myanmar) Lwin Oo
- (Thailand) Kiatisuk Senamuang
- (Vietnam) Huỳnh Hồng Sơn
- (Vietnam) Trần Trường Giang

2 goals

- (Cambodia) Ung Kanyanith
- (Indonesia) Budi Sudarsono
- (Indonesia) Sugiantoro
- (Malaysia) Akmal Rizal Ahmad Rakhli
- (Myanmar) Aung Kyaw Moe
- (Myanmar) Zaw Zaw
- (Myanmar) Zaw Htaik
- (Myanmar) Tint Naing Tun Thein
- (Singapore) Mohd Noor Ali
- (Thailand) Therdsak Chaiman
- (Vietnam) Nguyễn Minh Phương
- (Vietnam) Trịnh Xuân Thành
- (Vietnam) Đặng Phương Nam

1 goal

- (Indonesia) Gendut Doni Christiawan
- (Indonesia) Yaris Riyadi
- (Indonesia) Imran Nahumarury
- (Malaysia) Mohd Nizaruddin Yusof
- (Malaysia) Mohd Nizam Jamil
- (Malaysia) Tengku Hazman Raja Hassan
- (Myanmar) Htay Aung
- (Myanmar) Soe Lin Tun
- (Philippines) Richard Cañedo
- (Philippines) Ali Go
- (Philippines) Alfredo Razon Gonzalez
- (Singapore) Noh Alam Shah
- (Thailand) Chukiat Noosarung

1goal

- (Thailand) Narongchai Vachiraban
- (Thailand) Manit Noywech
- (Thailand) Sakda Joemdee
- (Vietnam) Nguyễn Quốc Trung
- (Vietnam) Phạm Văn Quyến
- (Vietnam) Phan Văn Tài Em

1 own goal

- (Philippines) Solomon Licuanan (against Indonesia)

== Team statistics ==
This table will show the ranking of teams throughout the tournament.

Pos	Team	Pld	W	D	L	GF	GA	GD
Finals
1	Thailand	5	2	2	1	13	7	+6
2	Indonesia	6	3	3	0	22	7	+15
Semifinals
3	Vietnam	6	4	1	1	21	12	+9
4	Malaysia	5	2	1	2	9	5	+4
Eliminated in the group stage
5	Myanmar	4	2	1	1	13	5	+8
6	Singapore	3	1	1	1	3	6	−3
7	Cambodia	4	1	0	3	5	18	−13
8	Laos	3	0	1	2	3	8	−8
9	Philippines	4	0	0	4	3	24	−21
