= Vietnam v China PR (2022 FIFA World Cup qualification) =

Football match taking place in Vietnam in February 2022

Hanoi massacre (河内惨案)
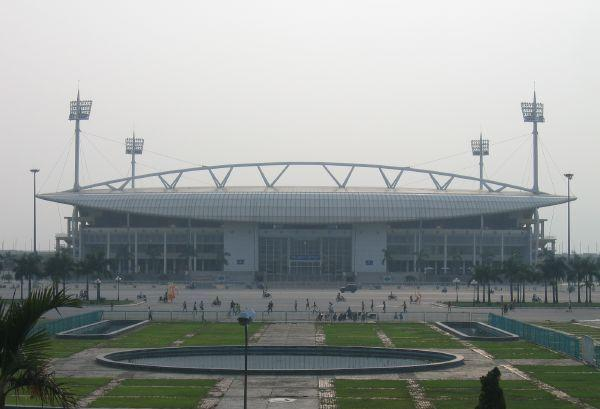
- The match was played at Mỹ Đình National Stadium, Hanoi, Vietnam
- Event: 2022 FIFA World Cup qualification – AFC third round Match 8
Vietnam	China PR
(Vietnam)	(China)
3	1
- Date: February 1, 2022; 4 years ago
- Venue: Mỹ Đình National Stadium, Hanoi
- Referee: Nawaf Shukralla (Bahrain)
- Attendance: 6,099
- Weather: Colder night 13 °C (55 °F); 77% humidity

On February 1, 2022, Vietnam men's national team played against the China PR in the eighth match of the 2022 FIFA World Cup qualification – AFC third round at the Mỹ Đình National Stadium, Hanoi, Vietnam. In this match, Vietnam surprisingly won 3–1 right on their home field to make China no longer have a chance to qualify for the 2022 FIFA World Cup, with goals from Hồ Tấn Tài in the 9th minute, Nguyễn Tiến Linh in the 16th minute and Phan Văn Đức in the 76th minute. The result of the match then caused huge shock and anger from Chinese football fans, leading to this match being dubbed Hanoi massacre (Chinese: 河内惨案) by the Chinese newspaper. And was later regarded as "The most humiliating defeat in Chinese football history".

In contrast to the anger of Chinese fans, the Vietnamese side was delighted with the result of this match, as it not only ended a losing streak against their opponents since their first meeting in 1997, (Note: Before that, China had six matches against the North Vietnam team with the results of 5 wins and 1 draw, but these matches were not counted in the overall achievements of both teams because the North Vietnam team was not a member of any international football federation or association; on the contrary, the South Vietnam team had full membership status of both FIFA and AFC, and the unified Vietnam team after 1975 had all statistics inherited by FIFA from the South Vietnam team, not the North team.) but also helped Vietnam become the first national football team in Southeast Asia to win a match in the third qualifying round of the World Cup. As the match also took place on the occasion of the traditional Lunar New Year of both countries, this victory became even more meaningful and brought great joy to the Vietnamese people on New Year's Day. This is the only time Vietnam has won against China so far.

== Background ==
The third round of the qualification for 2022 FIFA World Cup in Asia was played from September 2, 2021 to March 29, 2022. The twelve teams that advanced from the second round (the seven group winners excluding Qatar and the five best group runners-up) were divided into two groups of six teams to play home-and-away round-robin matches. The top two teams of each group qualified for the 2022 FIFA World Cup, and the two third-placed teams advanced to the fourth round (consisted of a single-match playoff). The first leg match between Vietnam and China took place on October 28, 2021 at the Shajah Stadium in the UAE. (Note: The match took place at a neutral venue due to the COVID-19 outbreak in China.) At the time of this match, the qualifying round had gone through 7 rounds.

This match will be the eighth time the two teams have faced each other, since their first meeting in 1997. In all previous encounters, China has always had the absolute advantage in terms of head-to-head record, winning all seven matches. At the same time, the match will take place on the first day of the Lunar New Year – an occasion of special significance in Vietnamese culture and one of the most important holidays in the cultures of both countries.

== Teams ==
=== Vietnam ===
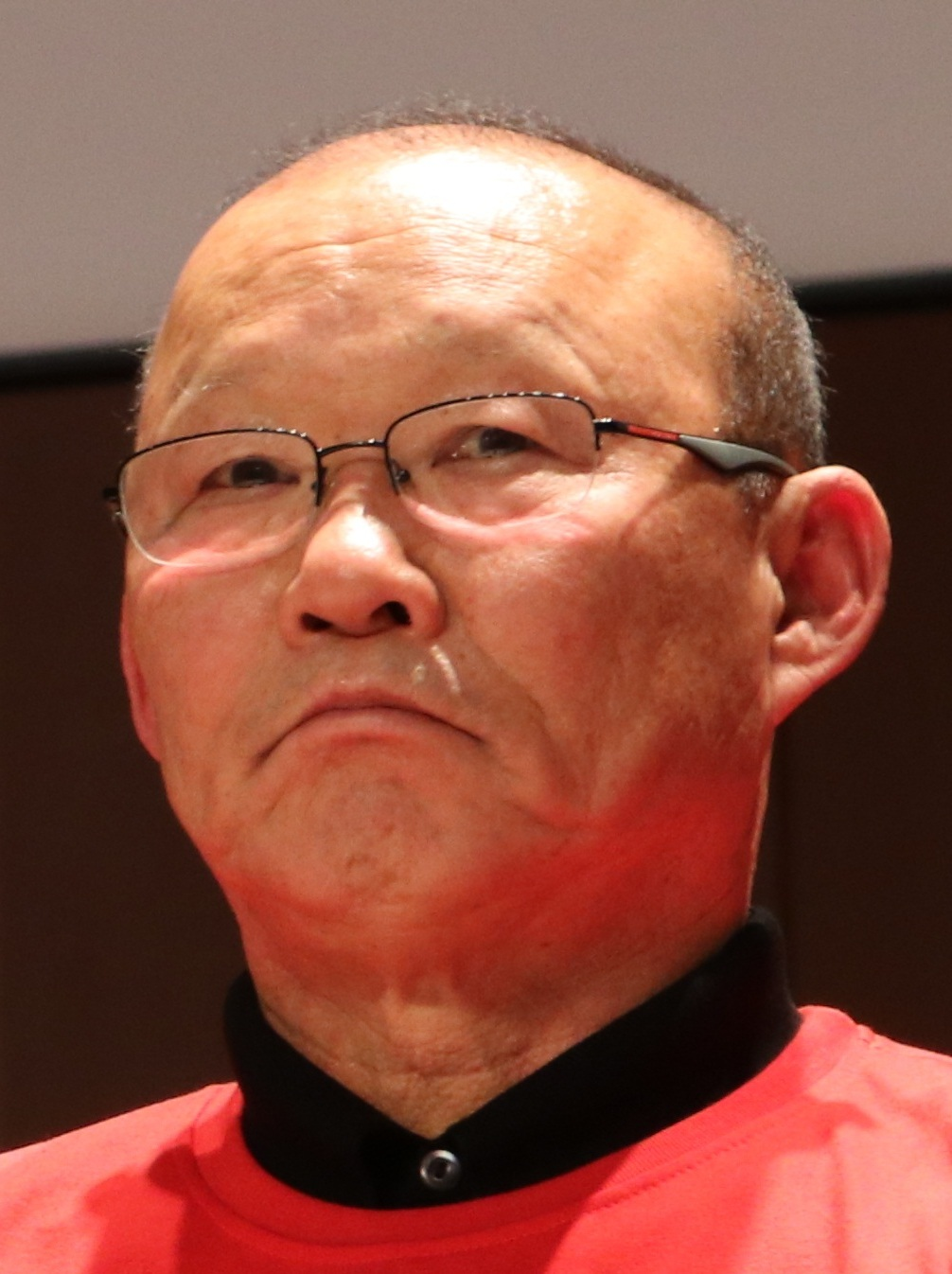
Park Hang-seo, who led Vietnam to the third round of the qualifiers.

Vietnam performed impressively in the second qualifying round when they were in Group G with the United Arab Emirates, Thailand, Malaysia and Indonesia. Under the guidance of coach Park Hang-seo, the team won 17 points after 8 matches, ranked second in the group and was one of the five best second-placed teams, thereby winning the right to enter the third qualifying round. This is considered a historic milestone for Vietnamese football, when for the first time the national team advanced to the final qualifying round of the Asian region. However, when entering the third qualifying round, the Vietnamese team had to face the top opponents in the continent. The team was in Group B, along with Japan, Saudi Arabia, Australia, Oman and China. After the first seven matches before the match against China, the Vietnamese team lost all, did not gain any points, scored 4 goals and conceded 16 goals. Although they left some marks such as the resilient away match against Japan (lost 0–1) or caused difficulties for Saudi Arabia at Mỹ Đình Stadium, the team still failed to show effectiveness in defense and taking advantage of opportunities. Despite this, coach Park Hang-seo and his players remained determined to fight for pride and points in the remaining fixtures, especially against regional rivals like China.

In terms of personnel, the Vietnamese team entered the match against China with many difficulties related to the COVID-19 epidemic. Some key players could not participate in the first training sessions due to illness or injury treatment. However, as the match day approached, the team's personnel were basically stable. The match also witnessed the return of fans to Mỹ Đình Stadium after a long period without spectators due to the impact of the pandemic. In addition, public pressure on the team and coaching staff also increased after a series of unsatisfactory results, in the context of increasing expectations from fans after success in regional and continental tournaments in the 2018–2021 period.

=== China ===
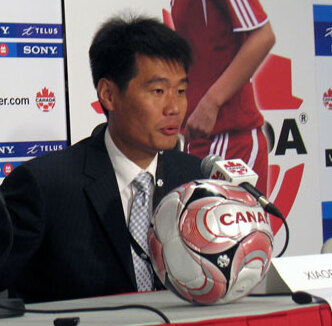
Li Xiaopeng, China's new manager following Li Tie's resignation.

China entered the third qualifying round as the second-placed team in Group A of the second qualifying round, behind Syria. Under the guidance of coach Li Tie in the early stages of the qualifiers, China were expected to compete for a place in the 2022 World Cup, especially after naturalizing a number of players with Brazilian and European roots such as Elkeson, Alan Carvalho, and Tyias Browning. However, after the first 6 matches in the third qualifying round, the Chinese team only won 5 points, with 1 win (against Vietnam), 2 draws and 4 losses. The performance did not meet expectations, forcing coach Li Tie to resign in early December 2021. Coach Li Xiaopeng was immediately appointed as a replacement in the context that the team needed to refresh its approach and regain the trust of fans. Before the match, the Chinese team was ranked 5th in Group B, 5 points ahead of Vietnam. In addition, the Chinese team also faced many difficulties in preparation, including not being able to play at home due to strict COVID-19 control measures in the country. Instead, they had to play at a neutral venue in the West Asia region throughout the qualifying stage, and the match was the first time the team had to travel to Southeast Asia since the beginning of the qualifying round.

In the context of increasing pressure from domestic public opinion due to the unsatisfactory performance in the third qualifying round, the Chinese team is expected to enter the match with great determination to win completely, thereby boosting the team's spirit and somewhat allaying the wave of criticism from fans, especially when the confrontation with Vietnam takes place right on the occasion of the traditional New Year - a time with many sacred meanings and often associated with the hope of a favorable start to the new year according to Chinese cultural traditions.

=== Head-to-head records ===
Matches between Vietnam and China (before January 2022)
May 25, 1997
1998 FIFA World Cup qualification (AFC first round)

Vietnam	1–3	China
Le Huynh Duc 38'	Report	Li Bing 23'; Fan Zhiyi 32'; Hao Haidong 44'

Thong Nhat Stadium, Ho Chi Minh City
Attendance: 23,000
Referee: Russamee Jindamai (Thailand)
June 22, 1997
1998 FIFA World Cup qualification (AFC first round)

China	4–0	Vietnam
Fan Zhiyi 7'; Hao Haidong 45'; Ma Mingyu 65'; Su Maozhen 70'	Report

Workers Stadium, Beijing
Attendance: 15,000
Referee: Jang Sok Jin (North Korea)
29 January 2000
2000 AFC Asian Cup qualification

Vietnam	0–2	China
		Su Maozhen 27'; Zhang Enhua 89'

Thống Nhất Stadium, Ho Chi Minh City
Attendance: 16,000
January 21, 2009
19:35 UTC+8
2011 AFC Asian Cup qualification

China	6–1	Vietnam
Gao Lin 2', 20', 84'; Du Wei 27'; Jiang Ning 37'; Hao Junmin 47'	Report	Nguyễn Vũ Phong 11'

Yellow Dragon Sports Center, Hangzhou
Attendance: 15,300
Referee: Kim Dong-Jin (Korea Republic)
January 17, 2010
19:00 UTC+7
2011 AFC Asian Cup qualification

Vietnam	1–2	China
Lê Công Vinh 76' (pen.)	Report	Yang Xu 35'; Zhang Linpeng 43'

Mỹ Đình National Stadium, Hanoi
Attendance: 3,000
Referee: Abdul Malik Abdul Bashir (Singapore)
June 8, 2012
Friendly match

China	3–0	Vietnam
Gao Lin 10', 64'; Feng Renliang 34'	Report

Wuhan Sports Center, Wuhan
Attendance: 30,000
Referee: Ko Hyung-Jin (South Korea)
October 8, 2021
2022 WCQ 3rd round

China	3–2	Vietnam
Zhang Yuning 53'; Wu Lei 75', 90+5'	Report (FIFA); Report (AFC)	Hồ Tấn Tài 80'; Nguyễn Tiến Linh 90'

Sharjah Stadium, Sharjah
Referee: Mohammed Abdulla Hassan Mohamed (United Arab Emirates)

Compared to China, Vietnam has shown to be completely inferior in terms of direct confrontation achievements with this opponent in the past. This is even more understandable when the rankings on the FIFA rankings between the two teams at the time of this match were quite different, in which, China ranked 76th, while Vietnam ranked 102nd. In addition, China had once qualified for the FIFA World Cup in 2002—the only time in the country's history. However, they exited the tournament in the group stage without scoring a goal and conceding nine in three matches.

Head-to-head history and statistics show that Vietnam has never won a match against a neighboring team. As of early February 2022, Vietnam had never beaten China in any official match or friendly encounter. The two teams first met in 1997 during the qualifiers for the 1998 FIFA World Cup. That match, held at Thống Nhất Stadium in Ho Chi Minh City, ended in a 3–1 victory for China. Since then, they had faced each other six more times in various competitions, and China had won every one of those matches. Vietnam’s heaviest defeat to China came in the 2011 AFC Asian Cup qualification, a 1–6 loss on Chinese soil. Most recently, on October 7, 2021, the teams met in the first-leg encounter of the third-round qualifiers, played at Sharjah Stadium in the UAE, which served as China's home ground due to pandemic regulations. Despite falling two goals behind, Vietnam fought back valiantly to equalize at 2–2 in the 90th minute but a stoppage-time goal secured a 3–2 win for China, extending their perfect record against Vietnam.

== Pre-match ==
Before the eighth matchday, the situation in Group B showed a clear divergence in points between the top and bottom teams. Both China and Vietnam were in the group with little chance of advancing, and were closely matched at the bottom of the standings. Specifically, after the first seven matches, China had one win, two draws, and four losses, accumulating a total of 5 points with a goal difference of −6, placing them 5th in the standings. Vietnam was ranked just below them at the bottom. The Southeast Asian representative had suffered a streak of seven consecutive losses since the beginning of the qualifying round, failing to earn any points, scoring only 4 goals but conceding 20, resulting in a very poor goal difference of −12. The gap between the two teams before the eighth matchday was 5 points.

Group B standings (after match 7)
Pos	Team	Pld	W	D	L	GF	GA	GD	Pts	Qualification
1	Saudi Arabia	7	6	1	0	10	3	+7	19	2022 FIFA World Cup
2	Japan	7	5	0	2	7	3	+4	15	2022 FIFA World Cup
3	Australia	7	4	2	1	13	4	+9	14	Fourth round
4	Oman	7	2	1	4	6	8	−2	7	
5	China (X)	7	1	2	4	7	13	−6	5	
6	Vietnam (E)	7	0	0	7	4	16	−12	0	

Updated to match(es) played on January 27, 2022. Source: FIFA
(E) Eliminated; (X) Failed to qualify directly; still able to advance to round 4

== Match ==
=== Summary ===
External videos
- Match highlights on the AFC Asian Cup's official YouTube channel

China kicked off the match at 19:00 local time (12:00 UTC) in front of a crowd of 6,099. Right from the first minutes, both teams entered the match with high determination, in which the Vietnamese team quickly demonstrated an active and effective playing style. In the 9th minute, defender Hồ Tấn Tài opened the scoring for the home team with an accurate header, after a pass from the right wing by captain Đỗ Hùng Dũng. This early goal created great momentum for the Vietnamese team to continue to maintain their attacking style. By the 16th minute, the score was raised to 2–0 when Hùng Dũng coordinated well with Nguyễn Tiến Linh, helping this striker finish close to the goal to double the gap. After conceding two goals in less than 20 minutes, China were forced to push forward in search of an equalizer. However, they struggled to break down the home team’s well-organised defence. China’s only notable chance of the first half came when Dai Wai Tsun free kick went over the crossbar in the closing minutes.

China try to put pressure on Vietnam's field in the second half. Zhang Yuning take the shot into the opponent's net in 49th minute, but the goal was not recognized because the referee determined it was offside. Although controlling the ball slightly at some points, the away team still did not create many truly dangerous situations. Meanwhile, the Vietnamese team maintained a disciplined playing style and took advantage of opportunities effectively. In the 76th minute, substitute Phan Văn Đức scored the third goal for the home team with a decisive long-range shot from outside the penalty area, raising the score to 3–0. It was not until the last minute of stoppage time that China was able to score a goal to reduce the score thanks to Xu Xin. However, this goal was only an honorary goal and could not change the outcome of the match.

=== Box score ===
1 February 2022
19:00 UTC+7

Vietnam	3–1	China
Hồ Tấn Tài 9'; Nguyễn Tiến Linh 16'; Phan Văn Đức 76'	(Note: "Vietnam vs China PR | Group B | FIFA World Cup Qualifier". FIFA. Archieved April 2, 2022. Retrieved July 19, 2026.; "Group B: Vietnam cruise past China PR for first win". AFC. February 1, 2022. Retrieved July 20, 2026.)	Xu Xin 90+7'

Mỹ Đình National Stadium, Hanoi
Attendance: 6,099
Referee: Nawaf Shukralla (Bahrain)

Vietnam	China PR

GK	23	Trần Nguyên Mạnh		(substituted off) 86'
LWB	7	Nguyễn Phong Hồng Duy		(substituted off) 86'
CB	21	Trần Đình Trọng		(substituted off) 46'
CB	16	Nguyễn Thành Chung
CB	4	Bùi Tiến Dũng
RWB	13	Hồ Tấn Tài	(yellow card) 45+2'
CM	8	Đỗ Hùng Dũng (c)
CM	14	Nguyễn Hoàng Đức
CM	19	Nguyễn Quang Hải
CF	11	Phạm Tuấn Hải		(substituted off) 90+1'
CF	22	Nguyễn Tiến Linh		(substituted off) 70'
Substitutions:
DF	12	Bùi Hoàng Việt Anh		(substituted on) 46'
FW	20	Phan Văn Đức		(substituted on) 70'
DF	17	Vũ Văn Thanh		(substituted on) 86'
GK	1	Bùi Tấn Trường		(substituted on) 86'
FW	10	Nguyễn Công Phượng		(substituted on) 90+1'
Manager:
(South Korea) Park Hang-seo

GK	1	Yan Junling
RB	5	Zhang Linpeng
CB	20	Zhu Chenjie
CB	6	Jiang Guangtai
LB	4	Wang Shenchao
CM	15	Wu Xi (c)	(yellow card) 5'
CM	13	Xu Xin	(yellow card) 43'
AM	21	Dai Weijun		(substituted off) 67'
RW	7	Wu Lei		(substituted off) 67'
CF	11	A Lan		(substituted off) 46'
LW	18	Luo Guofu	(yellow card) 36'	(substituted off) 46'
Substitutions:
FW	14	Wei Shihao		(substituted on) 46'
FW	9	Zhang Yuning		(substituted on) 46'
FW	17	Liu Binbin		(substituted on) 67'
DF	22	Yu Dabao		(substituted on) 67'
Manager:
Li Xiaopeng

Assistant referee:
Mohamed Salman (Bahrain)
Abdulla Saleh (Bahrain)
Fourth official:
Yahya Almulla (United Arab Emirates)
Video assistant referee:
Mohamad Amirul (Malaysia)
Muhammad Taqi (Singapore)

Match rules

- 90 minutes
- Maximum of twelve named substitutes
- Maximum of five substitutions

Team stats
Statistics	Vietnam	China PR
Goals	3	1
Shots	6	11
Shots on target	4	5
Ball possession	42%	58%
Corners	2	3
Fouls	15	14
Offsides	1	3
Cautions	1	3
Ejections	0	0

Scoring summary
Team	No.	Scorer	Minute	Score
VIE	13	Hồ Tấn Tài	9	1–0 VIE
VIE	22	Nguyễn Tiến Linh	16	2–0 VIE
VIE	20	Phan Văn Đức	76	3–0 VIE
CHN	13	Xu Xin	90+7	3–1 VIE

Misconducts: 4 cautions
Team	Player (type)	Minute
CHN	Wu Xi (Caution)	5
CHN	Luo Guofu (Caution)	36
CHN	Xu Xin (Caution)	43
VIE	Hồ Tấn Tài (Caution)	45+2

== Post-match ==
After match 8, the rankings of the teams in group B are as follows:

Pos	Team	Pld	W	D	L	GF	GA	GD	Pts	Qualification
1	Saudi Arabia (X)	8	6	1	1	10	5	+5	19	2022 FIFA World Cup
2	Japan (X)	8	6	0	2	9	3	+6	18	2022 FIFA World Cup
3	Australia (X)	8	4	3	1	15	6	+9	15	Fourth round
4	Oman (E)	8	2	2	4	8	10	−2	8	
5	China (E)	8	1	2	5	8	16	−8	5	
6	Vietnam (E)	8	1	0	7	7	17	−10	3	

Updated to match(es) played on February 1, 2022. Source: FIFA
(E) Eliminated; (X) Still able to advance to round 4

Match at the same time

19:14 UTC+9	Japan	2–0	Saudi Arabia	Saitama, Japan
	Takumi Minamino 32'; Junya Itō 50'	Report (FIFA); Report (AFC)		Referee: Ko Hyung-jin (South Korea)

20:00 UTC+4	Oman	2–2	Australia	Muscat, Oman
	Abdullah Fawaz 54', 89' (pen.)	Report (FIFA); Report (AFC)	Jamie Maclaren 15' (pen.); Aaron Mooy 79'	Referee: Mohammed Abdulla Hassan Mohamed (United Arab Emirates)

With a 3–1 result for Vietnam, Vietnam had their first win in the third qualifying round of a World Cup, and caused China to be eliminated early, despite the fact that they only had 2 matches left. In the match played at the same time between Oman and Australia, the two teams draw 2–2, but this result also caused Oman to be eliminated, because the gap between Oman and the top teams could not be closed in the remaining matches.

== Influence on public opinion ==
=== Vietnam ===
“Today, the whole team played very well. It would have been better if we had won 3–0, but 3–1 is fine. Many thanks to coach Park Hang-seo and the players. The team has brought a football feast to the Vietnamese people on the first day of the Lunar New Year. This is a precious gift for the fans, for the Vietnamese people on Tet holiday. Once again, I thank the coaching staff, the staff, the team, especially the players. Everyone has shown a resilient fighting spirit, fighting with all their might for the country in today's match. Thank you and happy new year."

— Prime Minister Phạm Minh Chính shared with the team after the match ended.

After the match ended, Vietnamese public opinion was happy because their team was finally able to win a match in the third qualifying round of the World Cup, and it was the first win against a neighboring opponent like China. The victory had a special meaning as it took place on the first day of the Lunar New Year, a time considered sacred in both Vietnamese and Chinese culture. News of the team's victory was quickly reported by Vietnamese state media on all of the country's mass media. The coincidence in timing made the reaction from the Vietnamese public even more enthusiastic. Many fans expressed their joy on social media platforms, considering this result a spiritual gift, or a “lucky money” from the team to the people of the whole country during the traditional New Year.

At the same time, the Vietnamese team received many compliments and positive reviews from domestic fans, and was also praised by senior leaders of the State and the sports industry. Among them, Prime Minister Phạm Minh Chính sent his congratulations to the entire team for their brave fighting spirit and meaningful victory on the occasion of the Lunar New Year, President of the Vietnam Football Federation Trần Quốc Tuấn also expressed his pride in the efforts and progress of the team through each match. In particular, Vietnam President at that time, Nguyễn Xuân Phúc acknowledged this victory as a meaningful New Year gift for the people of the whole country, while emphasizing the importance of developing football as part of the strategy to enhance the position of Vietnamese sports in the international competitions.

The match was also historic for Southeast Asian football, marking the first victory for a team from the region in the final qualifying round of the World Cup. Previously, the Thailand team had participated in this stage twice in 2002 and 2018 but failed to win either. Therefore, the result of the Vietnamese team is considered a new milestone for regional football. Although there is no chance of advancing, the victory over China has helped the Vietnamese team improve their fighting spirit after a series of unsuccessful matches, especially after the failure at the 2020 AFF Championship. In addition, this result also contributed to a period considered to be a bright spot for Vietnamese football in the first half of 2022. At the same time, the Vietnamese women's team won the right to participate in the Women's World Cup for the first time, the U-23 team won the AFF U-23 Championship for the first time in history, and both the men's and women's football teams win gold medals at the 2021 Southeast Asian Games (taking place in 2022) held on home soil.

Vietnam ended their qualifying campaign with a 1–1 draw against Japan, becoming the highest-scoring Southeast Asian team in the final qualifying round to that point, before this record was surpassed by Indonesia in the 2026 World Cup qualifiers two years later.

=== China ===
“I am disappointed with this result. I want to apologize to the fans. We made mistakes right at the beginning of the match, this is a very difficult result to accept. The Vietnamese team has improved very quickly through 7 matches in the 3rd qualifying round of the World Cup. Meanwhile, my players were too tense, leading to two early goals in the first half, losing control of the game and losing. After the break, I made some personnel adjustments. But many players had not played for a long time so they could not keep up with the pace of the match. Anyway, I am still satisfied with what they showed."

— Coach Li Xiaopeng shared in the press conference after the match.

The result of the match shocked the Chinese media, and made the country's football fans unable to hide their disappointment, as they had never lost to a team rated lower than them on the occasion of the New Year. This loss marked the first time in history that the Chinese national team had lost to Vietnam at the national team level. The Chinese media called it a "Tragedy in Hanoi" (Chinese: "河內慘案"), and at the same time made many public criticisms aimed at the head coach at that time, Li Xiaopeng, as well as the entire coaching staff and players.

The defeat not only eliminated China from the race for a ticket to the 2022 World Cup, but also sparked controversy among the public when it recalled the statement of former national team player Fan Zhiyi in 2013, after a 1–5 defeat to Thailand in a friendly match. At that time, this former player had warned that “There will come a day when China will lose to Vietnam”. This comment was repeated by the media and fans as evidence of the long-term decline of Chinese football in recent years. In addition, it also sparked a strong wave of indignation on Chinese social media platforms. Many fans said that the defeat to Vietnam was a clear demonstration of the problems within the national team, even calling it a “full exposure of the state of Chinese football”. Some fans called for the current president of the Chinese Football Association (CFA) to resign to save the country’s reputation, while others blamed the General Administration of Sport of China, even proposing to disband the national team for a comprehensive reform.

For Chinese public opinion, this defeat has dealt a heavy blow to the country's football. This is not only a bad result in terms of sports, but it also reflects the decline in the team's performance and form in recent years. This failure even opened the door to a crisis period for Chinese football in 2022, during which time many clubs in the Chinese Super League had to disband due to lack of funds, many players had to leave the league to seek opportunities at a new team, along with the performance of the teams in this league in continental tournaments seriously declining. More notably, at the end of 2022, coach Li Tie was arrested on corruption charges, and was sentenced to 20 years in prison by the court for bribery. This incident marked the decline of Chinese football in all aspects, from performance to the ethics of individuals in the sports industry. These effects continued until 2025, when China's national teams suffered consecutive defeats in continental tournaments, culminating in a 0–1 loss to Indonesia, despite the fact that the opponent had upgraded their squad with a series of naturalized players from Europe, but the way the Chinese team lost in Indonesia still left countless sighs. Also in 2025, the country's professional football clubs also had disappointing results when both representatives in the AFC Champions League could not continue, and Shandong Taishan even gave up halfway.

More than a year after the match ended, many Chinese football fans recalled the match as an "unwashable stain" in the history of Chinese football, especially after coach Aleksandar Janković was appointed as the head coach of the Chinese national team in February 2023, and some players involved in the match were also implicated in match-fixing suspicions, although no official information has been released. In 2024, a scene in episode 9 of the Chinese TV series Men in Love recreated the scene of the characters watching the match, in which the actors expressed anger and disappointment while watching the match, even left halfway when the home team conceded the third goal. These all show that the negative effects of the match still have a great influence on Chinese public opinion for a long time after the match ended.

== Similar cases ==
- China PR 1–2 Hong Kong (1985), the match cost China a place in the 1986 FIFA World Cup, and also sparked a riot at the match venue that forced police to intervene to restore order.
- Japan 2–2 Iraq (1993), although the two teams tied, the situation in their groups resulted in both teams failing to qualify for the 1994 FIFA World Cup, and also allowed Japan's arch-rivals, South Korea, to qualify. This match is also known by Japanese public opinion as the Agony in Doha (Japanese:ドーハの悲劇).
- South Korea 0–1 Vietnam (2003), South Korea at that time was the team that won the fourth place in the 2002 FIFA World Cup, but this match shocked the whole of Asia, and even led to the resignation of the head coach of South Korea at that time, Humberto Coelho. This match is also associated with the name of Phạm Văn Quyến, because this player scored the only goal that helped Vietnam win that match.
- Vietnam 2–0 United Arab Emirates (2007 AFC Asian Cup), this match shocked all of Asia at that time, because Vietnam was rated lower than its opponent, in addition, the 2007 AFC Asian Cup was the first tournament that Vietnam participated in as a unified country.
- Malaysia 0–3 Saudi Arabia (2018 FIFA World Cup qualification).

== See also ==
- 2022 FIFA World Cup qualification – AFC third round
