= Therdsak Chaiman =

Thai footballer

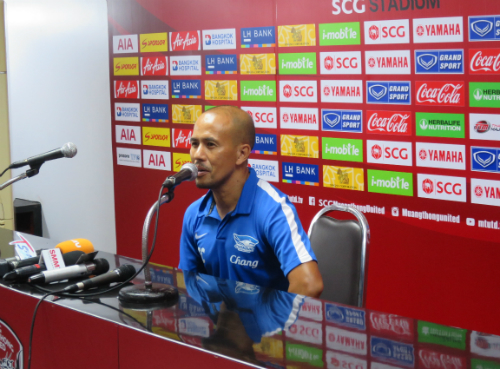
- Chaiman as manager of Chonburi in 2016

Personal information
- Full name: Therdsak Chaiman
- Date of birth: 29 September 1973 (age 53)
- Place of birth: Suphan Buri, Thailand
- Height: 1.64 m (5 ft 4 1/2 in)
- Position: Attacking midfielder

Team information
- Current team: Chonburi (Head Coach)

Youth career
- 1989–1991: Rajadamnern Commercial College
- 1992–1993: Stock Exchange of Thailand

Senior career*
| Years | Team | Apps | (Gls) |
| 1994–1998 | Royal Thai Navy | 97 | (33) |
| 1998–1999 | Osotspa | 34 | (12) |
| 2000–2003 | BEC Tero Sasana | 65 | (17) |
| 2002 | → SAFFC (loan) | 33 | (27) |
| 2004 | Dong A Bank | 28 | (8) |
| 2005–2009 | SAFFC | 112 | (47) |
| 2010–2017 | Chonburi | 108 | (40) |
| Total | | 477 | (184) |

International career
| 1994–2010 | Thailand | 75 | (22) |
| 1999–2005 | Thailand (futsal) | 48 | (62) |

Managerial career
- 2015: Chonburi (assistant)
- 2016–2017: Chonburi
- 2018: Chonburi (assistant)
- 2019: Phuket City
- 2020: Port (assistant)
- 2020: Uthai Thani
- 2021–2022: Uthai Thani
- 2022–2023: Pattaya Dolphins United
- 2023: Rayong
- 2023–2026: Nagaworld (technical director)
- 2026–: Chonburi
Medal record
Thailand
AFF Championship
| Winner | 2000 | Team |
| Winner | 2002 | Team |
- * Club domestic league appearances and goals

Therdsak Chaiman (Thai: เทิดศักดิ์ ใจมั่น; born 29 September 1973) is a Thai football manager and former attacking midfielder. Regarded as one of Southeast Asia's greatest-ever footballers, he is affectionately known among Thai fans as Uncle Therd (Thai: น้าเทิด). Therdsak is currently the head coach of Thai League 1 club Chonburi.

== Club career ==
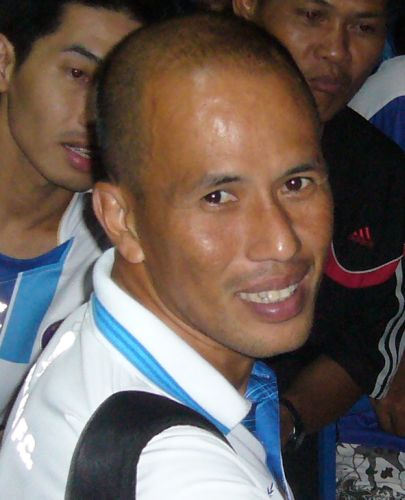
Therdsak with Chonburi in 2010

In 2002, he was loaned out to SAFFC in 2002 and proceeded to win the S.League player of the year. In 2003, Therdsak led BEC Tero Sasana to the final of the AFC Champions League against Al Ain FC in 2003. He scored against Taejon Citizen and Shanghai Shenhua in the process and was named the 2003 AFC Champions League most valuable player. In 2004, Therdsak secured a move to Vietnam's East Asia Bank but did not settle well due to a stomach muscle injury which kept him out for seven months. He promptly rejoined his former club SAFFC in 2005 despite interest from Home United Football Club. Despite his diminutive frame, Therdsak has proved to be more than capable to play with the bigwigs of international football, and at his peak, impressing many with his surging runs, vision and shot technique not often seen among footballers of his region.

Therdsak officially announced his retirement from professional football on 19 November 2017 after end of Thai League 1 season 2017 with quit of the manager job at Chonburi.

== Managerial career ==
On 21 December 2015, Chonburi appointed Therdsak as head coach, replacing Jadet Meelarp. He made the official managerial debut on 2 February 2016 in an AFC Champions League qualification match against Yangon United, where Chonburi won 3–2 at home after extra time. They then lost 0–9 to FC Tokyo from Japan and failed to reach the AFC Champions League's final stages.

== International career ==
Therdsak served Thailand in international football from 1994 to 2010, winning two AFF Championships and playing at three AFC Asian Cups, the last of which Thailand co-hosted in 2007. He also played for the Thailand national futsal team.

== International goals ==
| # | Date | Venue | Opponent | Score | Result | Competition |
|---|---|---|---|---|---|---|
| 1. | August 31, 1998 | Ho Chi Minh City, Vietnam | Indonesia | 3–2 | Won | 1998 Tiger Cup |
| 2. | June 18, 2000 | Bangkok, Thailand | Uzbekistan | 2–0 | Won | Friendly |
| 3. | June 18, 2000 | Bangkok, Thailand | Uzbekistan | 2–0 | Won | Friendly |
| 4. | September 1, 2000 | Shanghai, China | China | 1–3 | Lost | 2000 Four Nations Tournament |
| 5. | September 3, 2000 | Shanghai, China | Uzbekistan | 4–2 | Won | 2000 Four Nations Tournament |
| 6. | October 6, 2000 | Doha, Qatar | Qatar | 1–1 | Draw | Friendly |
| 7. | January 30, 2001 | Bangkok, Thailand | Kyrgyzstan | 3–1 | Won | Friendly |
| 8. | June 13, 2001 | Beirut, Lebanon | Sri Lanka | 4–2 | Won | 2002 FIFA World Cup qualification |
| 9. | June 15, 2001 | Beirut, Lebanon | Pakistan | 3–0 | Won | 2002 FIFA World Cup qualification |
| 10. | December 8, 2002 | Bangkok, Thailand | Vietnam | 2–1 | Won | Friendly |
| 11. | December 8, 2002 | Bangkok, Thailand | Vietnam | 2–1 | Won | Friendly |
| 12. | December 20, 2002 | Singapore | Malaysia | 1–3 | Lost | 2002 Tiger Cup |
| 13. | December 29, 2002 | Jakarta, Indonesia | Indonesia | 4–2 (pens) | Won | 2002 Tiger Cup |
| 14. | February 18, 2003 | Bangkok, Thailand | Qatar | 1–1 | Draw | 2003 King's Cup |
| 15. | November 19, 2003 | Bangkok, Thailand | Tajikistan | 1–0 | Won | 2004 Asian Cup Qualification |
| 16. | August 19, 2004 | Bangkok, Thailand | Malaysia | 1–2 | Lost | Friendly |
| 17. | October 8, 2004 | Bangkok, Thailand | Jordan | 2–3 | Lost | Friendly |
| 18. | October 13, 2004 | Bangkok, Thailand | United Arab Emirates | 3–0 | Won | 2006 FIFA World Cup qualification |
| 19. | December 10, 2004 | Kuala Lumpur, Malaysia | Myanmar | 1–1 | Draw | 2004 Tiger Cup |
| 20. | December 12, 2004 | Kuala Lumpur, Malaysia | Timor-Leste | 8–0 | Won | 2004 Tiger Cup |
| 21. | November 14, 2009 | Singapore | Singapore | 3–1 | Won | 2011 AFC Asian Cup qualification |
| 22. | January 20, 2010 | Nakhon Ratchasima, Thailand | Poland | 1–3 | Lost | 2010 King's Cup |

== Managerial statistics ==
As of match played 23 December 2023

Managerial record by team and tenure
| Team | From | To | Record | | | | |
| Team | From | To | P | W | D | L | Win % |
|---|---|---|---|---|---|---|---|
| Chonburi | 1 January 2016 | 19 November 2017 | 69 | 30 | 18 | 21 | 43.5 |
| Phuket City | 1 January 2019 | 30 November 2019 | 29 | 11 | 7 | 11 | 37.9 |
| Uthai Thani | 28 September 2020 | 21 December 2020 | 10 | 2 | 3 | 5 | 20.0 |
| Uthai Thani | 21 April 2021 | 31 May 2022 | 14 | 10 | 1 | 3 | 71.4 |
| Pattaya United | 8 August 2022 | 31 May 2023 | 30 | 20 | 3 | 7 | 66.7 |
| Rayong | 5 July 2023 | 25 December 2023 | 21 | 10 | 9 | 2 | 47.6 |
| Total | | | 173 | 83 | 41 | 49 | 48.0 |

== Honours ==
=== As player ===
BEC Tero Sasana

- Thai Premier League (2): 2000, 2001-02
- Thai FA Cup (1): 2000
- Kor Royal Cup (1): 2001

Singapore Armed Forces

- S.League (5): 2002, 2006, 2007, 2008, 2009
- Singapore Cup (2): 2007, 2008

Chonburi

- Thai FA Cup (1): 2010
- Kor Royal Cup (2): 2011, 2012

=== International ===
Thailand

- AFF Championship (2): 2000, 2002

=== Individual ===
- AFC Champions League Most Valuable Player : 2002–03
- AFC Futsal Championship Top Scorers : 2000
- AFF Championship Most Valuable Player : 2002
- ASEAN Club Championship Most Valuable Player: 2003
- Thai Premier League Player of the Month : May 2010

=== As manager ===
Chonburi

- Thai FA Cup: 2016

Uthai Thani

- Thai League 3: 2021–22
- Thai League 3 Northern Region: 2021–22

=== Individual ===
- Thai League 3 Coach of the Year: 2021–22
