= Harry Saputra =

Indonesian footballer

Personal information
- Full name: Harry Saputra
- Date of birth: 12 June 1981 (age 45)
- Place of birth: Jakarta, Indonesia
- Height: 1.80 m (5 ft 11 in)
- Position: Centre-back

Senior career*
| Years | Team | Apps | (Gls) |
| 1998–1999 | PSB Bogor | | |
| 1999–2000 | Persija Jakarta | | |
| 2001–2002 | Persib Bandung | | |
| 2002–2005 | Persikota Tangerang | | |
| 2006 | PSIM Yogyakarta | | |
| 2007 | Persis Solo | 28 | (0) |
| 2008–2009 | Persema Malang | | |
| 2009–2010 | PSMS Medan | | |
| 2011 | Tangerang Wolves | | |
| 2011–2012 | Persibo Bojonegoro | | |
| 2012–2014 | Persebaya 1927 | | |
| 2014–2015 | Martapura | | |

International career
| 2001–2003 | Indonesia U23 | | |
| 2002–2007 | Indonesia | 20 | (0) |
- * Club domestic league appearances and goals

Harry Saputra (born 12 June 1981) is an Indonesian former footballer. He was called to Indonesia national team at the 2004 and 2007 AFC Asian Cup as a reserve player.

== Honours ==
Persibo Bojonegoro

- Piala Indonesia: 2012

Indonesia

- AFF Championship runner-up: 2002
