= Sayed Tahir Shah =

Afghan footballer

Sayeed Tahir Shah
Personal information
- Full name: Sayeed Tahir Shah Mosawe
- Date of birth: February 5, 1980 (age 46)
- Place of birth: Dar-e-Turkman, Afghanistan
- Position: Forward

Team information
- Current team: Maiwand Kabul FC

Youth career
- Shahid Balkhi FC

Senior career*
| Years | Team | Apps | (Gls) |
| 2004–present | Maiwand Kabul FC | | |

International career
| 2003 | Afghanistan | 2 | (1) |
- * Club domestic league appearances and goals

Sayeed Tahir Shah (Persian: سید طاهر شاه موسوی) (born 5 February 1980) is an Afghan football player who plays as a forward for Maiwand Kabul FC. He has also played for the Afghanistan national football team.

== International career ==
He made his debut for national football team on 15 February 2002 in a friendly match at Kabul against a selection of ISAF where he scored Afghanistan's goal. He had been a member of a squad for 2004 AFC Asian Cup qualification where he scored a goal against Kyrgyzstan.

== National team statistics ==
Afghanistan national team
| Year | Apps | Goals |
|---|---|---|
| 2003 | 2 | 1 |
| Total | 2 | 1 |

=== International Goals ===
| No. | Date | Venue | Opponent | Score | Result | Competition |
|---|---|---|---|---|---|---|
| 1. | 16 March 2003 | Dasarath Rangasala Stadium, Kathmandu, Nepal | Kyrgyzstan | 1–0 | 2–1 | 2004 AFC Asian Cup qualification |
