= Agus Firmansyah =

Indonesian former football defender

Personal information
- Full name: Agus Firmansyah
- Date of birth: 7 April 1980 (age 46)
- Place of birth: Tangerang, Banten, Indonesia
- Height: 1.75 m (5 ft 9 in)
- Position: Defender

Senior career*
Years	Team	Apps	(Gls)
1998	Persikabo Bogor		
1999	Pelita Jaya		
2000–2006	Persikota Tangerang		
2007	Sriwijaya		
2008–2010	Deltras Sidoarjo		

International career
2002–2007	Indonesia	25	(0)

Managerial career
- 2019–2023: Indonesia U16 (Assistant coach)
- 2023–2024: Persekat Tegal (Technical director)
- 2026: Adhyaksa Bekasi (Technical director)
- 2026–: Persikota Tangerang
- * Club domestic league appearances and goals

Agus Firmansyah (born 7 April 1980) is an Indonesian professional football coach and former player who is the head coach of Liga Nusantara club Persikota Tangerang.

== Honours ==
Indonesia

- AFF Championship runner-up: 2002
