= Nguyễn Thế Anh =

Vietnamese footballer

Personal information
- Full name: Nguyễn Thế Anh
- Date of birth: 21 September 1981 (age 45)
- Place of birth: Vinh, Nghệ An, Vietnam
- Height: 1.81 m (5 ft 11 in)
- Position: Goalkeeper

Team information
- Current team: Hanoi FC (Goalkeeper coach)

Youth career
- 1992–1999: Sông Lam Nghệ An

Senior career*
Years	Team	Apps	(Gls)
2000–2003	Sông Lam Nghệ An	12	(0)
2004–2005	Dong A Bank	15	(0)
2006–2011	Becamex Bình Dương	32	(0)
2011–2012	Navibank Sài Gòn	21	(0)
2013–2015	XSKT Cần Thơ	27	(0)

International career
2002–2007	Vietnam	11	(0)
- * Club domestic league appearances and goals

Nguyễn Thế Anh (born 21 September 1981) is a Vietnamese former footballer who played as a goalkeeper. He is currently goalkeeper coach of V.League 1 club Hanoi FC.
