= Imran Nahumarury =

Indonesian footballer (born 1978)

Personal information
- Full name: Imran Nahumarury
- Date of birth: 12 November 1978 (age 47)
- Place of birth: Tulehu, Indonesia
- Height: 1.69 m (5 ft 6 1/2 in)
- Position: Midfielder

Team information
- Current team: Semen Padang (head coach)

Youth career
- 1995–1996: PSSI Baretti

Senior career*
Years	Team	Apps	(Gls)
1996–1998	PSB Bogor	55	(4)
1998–2000	Persikota Tangerang	47	(8)
2000–2004	Persija Jakarta	79	(15)
2004–2005	Persib Bandung	21	(0)
2005–2006	Persita Tangerang	27	(3)
2006–2007	Persikabo Bogor	25	(5)
2007–2008	PSSB Bireuen	15	(0)
Total		269	(35)

International career
1999–2002	Indonesia	17	(3)

Managerial career
- 2008: Tulehu Putra
- 2009–2016: ASIOP Apacinti
- 2015–2021: PSIS Semarang (assistant)
- 2021–2022: PSIS Semarang
- 2022: PSIM Yogyakarta
- 2023–2025: Malut United
- 2026–: Semen Padang
- * Club domestic league appearances and goals

Imran Nahumarury (born 12 November 1978) is an Indonesian former football player and manager who previously played as midfielder. He is currently the head coach of Indonesia Super League club Semen Padang.

== Club statistics ==
Club	Season	Super League		Premier Division		Piala Indonesia		Total	
Club	Season	Apps	Goals	Apps	Goals	Apps	Goals	Apps	Goals
Persija Jakarta	2002	-		21	3	-		21	3
PSSB Bireuen	2007	-		8	0	-		8	0
Total		-		29	3	-		29	3

== International career ==
Imran's international career began in 1999 and finished in 2002. His last call-up for the national team was for the 2002 Tiger Cup. He scored his first goals on 20 November 1999 against Cambodia in the 2000 AFC Asian Cup qualification.

== International goals ==
Imran Nahumarury: International goals
No.	Date	Venue	Opponent	Score	Result	Competition
1	20 November 1999	Senayan Stadium, Jakarta, Indonesia	Cambodia	3–1	9–2	2000 AFC Asian Cup qualification
3	10 November 2002	Singapore National Stadium, Kallang, Singapore	Singapore	1–1	1–1 (a.e.t.) (3–4 p)	Friendly
4	23 December 2002	Gelora Bung Karno Stadium, Jakarta, Indonesia	Philippines	11–1	13–1	2002 Tiger Cup

== Managerial statistics ==
As of match played 23 May 2026

Managerial record by team and tenure
Team	Nat.	From	To	Record					Ref.
Team	Nat.	From	To	G	W	D	L	Win %	Ref.
PSIS Semarang (caretaker)	(Indonesia)	9 August 2021	16 September 2021	2	1	1	0	50.00	
PSIS Semarang	(Indonesia)	20 November 2021	18 December 2021	5	2	1	2	40.00	
PSIM Yogyakarta	(Indonesia)	14 April 2022	13 September 2022	3	0	3	0	0.00	
Malut United	(Indonesia)	6 April 2023	16 June 2025	56	24	22	10	42.86	
Semen Padang	(Indonesia)	5 March 2026	Present	10	1	0	9	10.00	
Career Total				76	28	27	21	36.84	

== Honours ==
=== Player ===
Persija Jakarta

- Liga Indonesia Premier Division: 2001

Indonesia

- AFF Championship runner-up: 2000, 2002

=== Manager ===
Individual

- Liga 1 Coach of the Month: September 2021, March 2025, April 2025
