= North Bar =

Bar in Leeds, West Yorkshire in England

Coordinates: 53.79959°N 1.54163°W

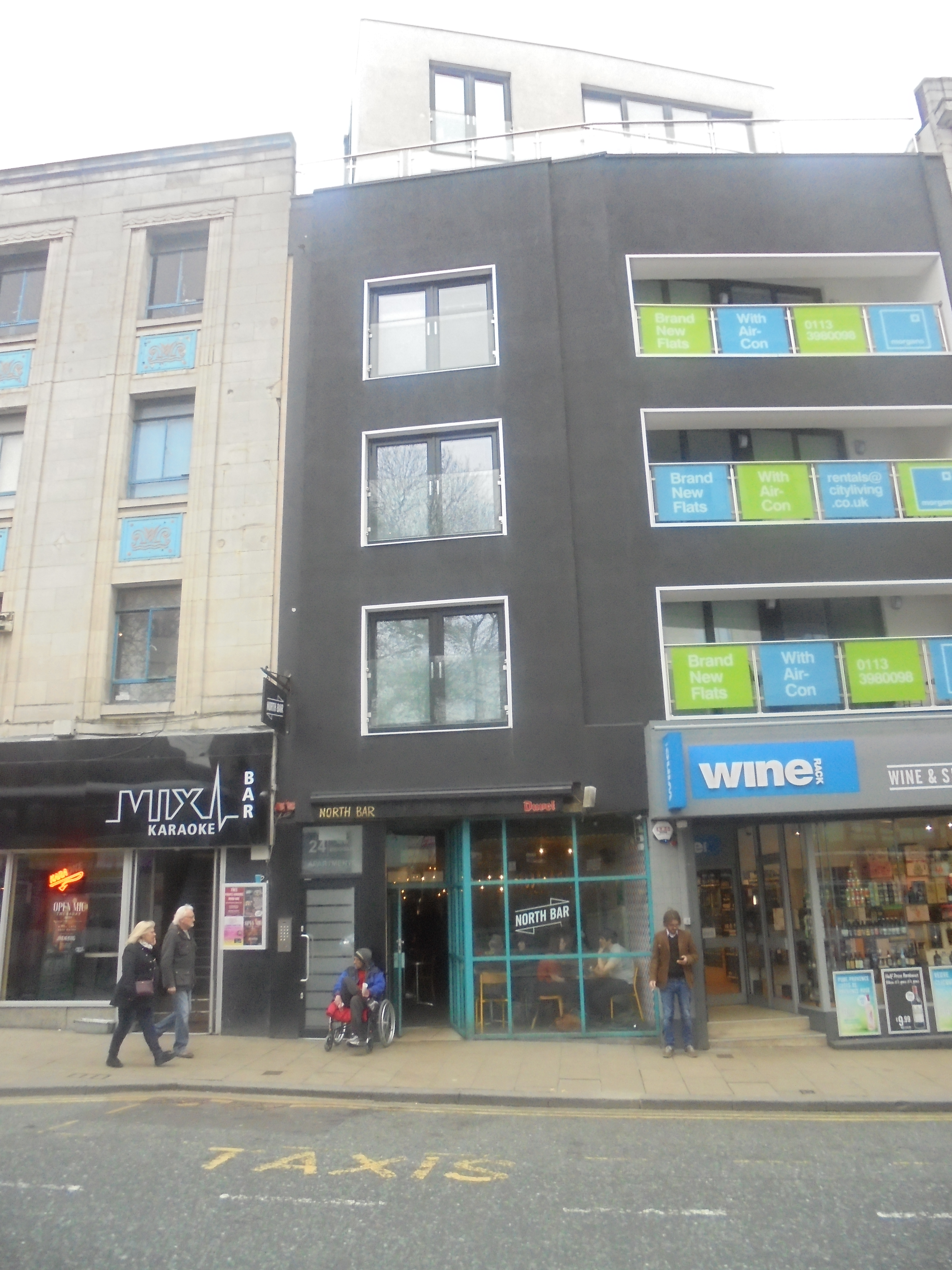
North Bar in 2018

North Bar is a bar on New Briggate in Leeds, West Yorkshire in England. It was opened by John Gyngell and Christian Townsley in June 1997.

North Bar was named winner of the 2006 Observer Food Monthly 'Best place to drink in Britain' ahead of 11,000 other licensed establishments.
