= Trịnh Xuân Thành (footballer) =

Vietnamese footballer (born 1976)

Trịnh Xuân Thành (born 1976) is a Vietnamese former footballer who played as a midfielder.

== Early life ==
He was described as "a talented player at Hai Phong Sports Academy, trained by coach Thanh Kiem. Not yet 20 years old, he was named in the CAHP squad and along with Truong Son became two promising young faces of port football".

== Career ==
He played for the Vietnam national football team.

== Style of play ==
He mainly operated as a midfielder and was known for his technical ability.

== Personal life ==
He has an older brother.
