= Tengku Hazman =

Malaysian footballer

Hazman Hassan
Personal information
- Birth name: Tengku Hazman bin Raja Hassan
- Date of birth: 6 March 1977 (age 49)
- Place of birth: Kelantan, Malaysia
- Position: Midfielder

Team information
- Current team: Terengganu (assistant)

Youth career
- 1996: Perlis President's

Senior career*
Years	Team	Apps	(Gls)
1997	Perlis		
1998	Olympic 2000		
2001–2002	Selangor		
2003–2005	Perlis		
2005	MPPJ Selangor		
2006–2007	Telekom Melaka		
2007–2008	Pahang		
2009	KL PLUS		
2010	Terengganu		
2011	PKNS		

International career^{‡}
1997–1998	Malaysia U-21		
1999–2000	Malaysia U-23		
1998–2005	Malaysia	16	(3)

Managerial career
- 2013–2016: Kelantan U-19
- 2017–2018: T–Team U-21
- 2018–2019: Terengganu II
- 2020–2025: Kelantan United (assistant)
- 2025: Terengganu (assistant)
- 2025–2026: Terengganu (interim)
- 2026–: Terengganu (assistant)
- * Club domestic league appearances and goals as of 31 May 2011 ‡ National team caps and goals as of 29 July 2011

Tengku Hazman bin Raja Hassan (born 6 March 1977) is a Malaysian former professional footballer.

== Personal life ==
His younger brother Tengku Hasbullah is also a professional football player, formerly playing for Kelantan FA.

== Club career ==
He last played as a midfielder with PKNS FC, which he joined from his previous club Terengganu FA for the 2011 season.

== International career ==
Hazman represented Malaysia 16 times from 1998 to 2005, scoring 3 goals. He also has captained the national team. Early in his career, he was in the Malaysia national under-21 football team that competes in the 1997 FIFA World Youth Championship, held in Malaysia.

== International goals ==
#	Date	Venue	Opponent	Score	Result	Competition
1.	20 December 2002	National Stadium, Singapore	Thailand	3–1	Win	2002 Tiger Cup Group Stage
2.	8 October 2003	National Stadium, Bukit Jalil, Malaysia	Myanmar	4–0	Win	2004 AFC Asian Cup qualification Group Stage
3.	8 October 2003	National Stadium, Bukit Jalil, Malaysia	Myanmar	4–0	Win	2004 AFC Asian Cup qualification Group Stage

== Managerial career ==
After his playing career ended, Hazman turned to coaching and has coached youth teams of Kelantan and T-Team. He acted as assistant coach to Mustafa Kamal during Terengganu II's 2018 Malaysia Premier League season, and subsequently took over as acting head coach in August 2018 after Mustafa was sacked due to his failure to avoid Terengganu II's relegation to Malaysia FAM League. In this capacity, Hazman succeeded in leading the club to win the inaugural Malaysia Challenge Cup, beating UKM F.C., 4–2, on aggregate in the final.

== Managerial statistics ==
As of 30 June 2026

Managerial record by team and tenure
Team	Nat.	From	To	Record					Ref.
Team	Nat.	From	To	G	W	D	L	Win %	Ref.
Terengganu II	(Malaysia)	1 August 2018	31 October 2019	38	17	12	9	44.74	
Terengganu (interim)	(Malaysia)	26 December 2025	30 June 2026	16	7	4	5	43.75	
Career Total				54	24	16	14	44.44	

== Honours ==
=== Selangor ===
- Malaysia FA Cup: 2001

=== Perlis ===
- Malaysia Cup: 2004

=== PKNS FC ===
- Malaysia Premier League: 2011
