= Yaris Riyadi =

Indonesian footballer

Personal information
- Date of birth: 21 January 1973 (age 53)
- Place of birth: Bandung, Indonesia
- Height: 1.66 m (5 ft 5 in)
- Position: Attacking midfielder

Senior career*
Years	Team	Apps	(Gls)
1995–2007	Persib Bandung		
2003	→ Pelita Krakatau Steel (loan)		
2008–2009	Persikab Bandung		
2009–2010	PSIS Semarang		
2010–2011	Bandung		

International career
2000–2003	Indonesia	17	(1)
- * Club domestic league appearances and goals

Yaris Riyadi (born 21 January 1973) is an Indonesian former professional footballer who played as an attacking midfielder. He represented Indonesia internationally at the 2000 AFC Asian Cup.

== Club career ==
Riyadi started his career with Persib Bandung.

== Career statistics ==
=== International ===
Scores and results list Indonesia's goal tally first, score column indicates score after each Riyadi goal.

List of international goals scored by Yaris Riyadi
No.	Date	Venue	Opponent	Score	Result	Competition	Ref.
1	29 December 2002	Gelora Bung Karno Stadium, Jakarta, Indonesia	Thailand	1–2	2–2	2002 AFF Championship	

== Honours ==
Indonesia

- AFF Championship runner-up: 2000, 2002
