= Sakda Joemdee =

Thai footballer (born 1982)

Personal information
- Full name: Sakda Joemdee
- Date of birth: 7 April 1982 (age 44)
- Place of birth: Rayong, Thailand
- Height: 1.64 m (5 ft 4 1/2 in)
- Position: Defensive midfielder

Youth career
- 1997–1999: Suankularb Wittayalai School

Senior career*
Years	Team	Apps	(Gls)
2000–2002	Osotsapa	55	(2)
2003	Hoàng Anh Gia Lai	18	(0)
2004	Persibat Batang	28	(1)
2006–2014	Hoàng Anh Gia Lai	192	(6)
2015–2017	Super Power Samut Prakan	44	(0)
2017	Kopoon Warrior	2	(0)
2017	Udon Thani	6	(0)
Total		345	(9)

International career
1998–1999	Thailand U17	7	(0)
2003–2005	Thailand U23		
2002–2004	Thailand	22	(2)

Managerial career
- 2023: Suankularb Wittayalai School
- * Club domestic league appearances and goals

Sakda Joemdee (Thai: ศักดา เจิมดี, Vietnamese: Đoàn Văn Sakda; born 7 April 1982) is a Thai retired professional footballer who played as a defensive midfielder.

Sakda has Vietnamese nationality due to his long time careers at Vietnam on 17 January 2009, under the name Đoàn Văn Sakda.

== International career ==
Joemdee made two appearances for the Thailand national football team at the 2004 AFC Asian Cup finals in China.

== International goals ==
#	Date	Venue	Opponent	Score	Result	Competition
1.	December 27, 2002	Jakarta, Indonesia	Vietnam	4-0	Won	2002 Tiger Cup (Semi-finals)
2.	December 2, 2004	Bangkok, Thailand	Slovakia	1-1 (4-5 pen.)	Lost	2004 King's Cup

== Honours ==
=== International ===
Thailand U-23

- Sea Games Gold Medal: 2003, 2005

Thailand

- ASEAN Football Championship: 2002
