= Zaenal Arief =

Indonesian footballer

Personal information
- Full name: Zaenal Arief
- Date of birth: 3 January 1981 (age 45)
- Place of birth: Garut, Indonesia
- Height: 1.78 m (5 ft 10 in)
- Position: Striker

Senior career*
Years	Team	Apps	(Gls)
1997–1998	Persigar Garut	12	(9)
1998–2000	Persib Bandung	34	(15)
2000–2005	Persita Tangerang	99	(44)
2005–2009	Persib Bandung	52	(18)
2009–2010	Persisam Putra Samarinda	29	(3)
2010–2011	Persikabo Bogor	18	(10)
2011–2012	PSPS Pekanbaru	29	(9)
2012–2014	Persepam MU	42	(12)
Total		218	(96)

International career
2000	Indonesia U19		
2001–2003	Indonesia U23		
2002–2007	Indonesia	23	(13)
- * Club domestic league appearances and goals

Zaenal Arief or Abo (born 3 January 1981) is an Indonesian former professional footballer. He plays as a striker. He last played for Persepam MU in Indonesia Super League. He also played for Indonesia national football team. His younger brother, Yandi Munawar, is also a footballer.

== Club career ==
=== Persigar Garut ===
Arief started his career with his hometown club, Persigar Garut. He began his first team debut when he was 16 years old. Arief stayed with Persigar for one season.

=== Persib Bandung ===
In the 1998 season, he moved to Persib Bandung. He rarely played because he could not compete with the senior players. He had only played until the 1999 season.

=== Persita Tangerang ===
In summer 2000, he was signed by Persita Tangerang. At this club he was starting to get rations to play. He debuted as a major player at the age of 20. In 2002, aged 21, he got the call to play with the Indonesian national team. Arief, who is now labeled "Sudag Caps," began to demand by many clubs. He remained in Persita until 2006.

== International goals ==
Zaenal Arief: International goals
No.	Date	Venue	Opponent	Score	Result	Competition
1	17 December 2002	Gelora Bung Karno Stadium, Jakarta, Indonesia	Cambodia	1–1	4–2	2002 Tiger Cup
2	21 December 2002	Gelora Bung Karno Stadium, Jakarta, Indonesia	Vietnam	2–2	2–2	2002 Tiger Cup
3	23 December 2002	Gelora Bung Karno Stadium, Jakarta, Indonesia	Philippines	2–0	13–1	2002 Tiger Cup
4	23 December 2002	Gelora Bung Karno Stadium, Jakarta, Indonesia	Philippines	6–0	13–1	2002 Tiger Cup
5	23 December 2002	Gelora Bung Karno Stadium, Jakarta, Indonesia	Philippines	7–0	13–1	2002 Tiger Cup
6	23 December 2002	Gelora Bung Karno Stadium, Jakarta, Indonesia	Philippines	9–0	13–1	2002 Tiger Cup
7	6 October 2003	Prince Abdullah Al Faisal Stadium, Jeddah, Saudi Arabia	Bhutan	2–0	2–0	2004 AFC Asian Cup qualification
8	8 October 2003	Prince Abdullah Al Faisal Stadium, Jeddah, Saudi Arabia	Yemen	2–0	3–0	2004 AFC Asian Cup qualification
9	13 October 2003	Prince Abdullah Al Faisal Stadium, Jeddah, Saudi Arabia	Bhutan	2–0	2–0	2004 AFC Asian Cup qualification
10	15 October 2003	Prince Abdullah Al Faisal Stadium, Jeddah, Saudi Arabia	Yemen	2–1	2–2	2004 AFC Asian Cup qualification
11	29 August 2006	Shah Alam Stadium, Selangor, Malaysia	Myanmar	1–2	1–2	2006 Pestabola Merdeka
12	17 January 2007	Singapore National Stadium, Kallang, Singapore	Singapore	2–2	2–2	2007 AFF Championship
13	1 June 2007	Gelora Bung Karno Stadium, Jakarta, Indonesia	Hong Kong	3–0	3–0	Friendly

== Honours ==
Persita Tangerang

- Liga Indonesia Premier Division runner up: 2002

Indonesia

- AFF Championship runner-up: 2002
- Pestabola Merdeka runner-up: 2006
