= Nguyễn Tuấn Phong =

Vietnamese footballer (born 1981)

Personal information
- Full name: Nguyễn Tuấn Phong
- Date of birth: October 14, 1981 (age 45)
- Place of birth: Ho Chi Minh City, Vietnam
- Height: 1.78 m (5 ft 10 in)
- Position: Midfielder

Youth career
- 1999–2001: Hồ Chí Minh City Police

Senior career*
| Years | Team | Apps | (Gls) |
| 2002–2005 | Hồ Chí Minh City Prolice | 63 | (14) |
| 2006–2014 | Đồng Tâm Long An | 195 | (72) |

International career
| 2002–2003 | Vietnam U23 | 8 | (2) |
| 2003–2011 | Vietnam | 32 | (9) |
- * Club domestic league appearances and goals

Nguyễn Tuấn Phong (born 14 October 1981) is a Vietnamese footballer who plays as a midfielder for V-League club Đồng Tâm Long An. He was a member of Vietnam national football team.
