= Soe Lin Tun =

Burmese footballer

Personal information
- Full name: Soe Lin Tun
- Date of birth: December 12, 1985 (age 40)
- Position: Midfielder

International career
| Years | Team | Apps | (Gls) |
| 2006–2015 | Myanmar | 27 | (0) |

Soe Lin Tun (Burmese: စိုးလင်းထွန်း; born 12 December 1985) is a footballer from Myanmar. He made his first appearance for the Myanmar national football team in 2006.

== International ==
In 2007, He represent the Myanmar U-23 to The Final of 2007 SEA Games. But Cruised by Thailad U-23. so Myanmar only get silver medal.
