= Ali Go =

Filipino footballer

Personal information
- Full name: Ali Bernard Rojas Go
- Date of birth: 21 September 1976 (age 50)
- Place of birth: Bacolod, Philippines
- Height: 1.78 m (5 ft 10 in)
- Position: Striker

Senior career*
| Years | Team | Apps | (Gls) |
| 2003–2004 | North Bar | | |
| 2005–2006 | Negros Occidental | | |
| 2006–2011 | Kaya | | |

International career
| 2000–2007 | Philippines | 14 | (1) |
- * Club domestic league appearances and goals

Ali Bernard Rojas Go (born 21 September 1976) is a Filipino former international footballer who played as a striker.

== Playing career ==
Born in Bacolod, Go played club football for North Bar, Negros Occidental and Kaya.

He also earned fourteen international caps for the Philippines between 2000 and 2007, and participated at the 2002 Tiger Cup where he scored a goal in a 13-1 loss to Indonesia.

== Coaching career ==
He later became Technical Director at Ceres–Negros. He also worked with the club as its head coach.

== International goals ==
Scores and results list the Philippines' goal tally first.

| # | Date | Venue | Opponent | Score | Result | Competition |
|---|---|---|---|---|---|---|
| 1. | 23 December 2002 | Gelora Bung Karno Stadium, Jakarta | Indonesia | 10–1 | 13–1 | 2002 Tiger Cup |
