= Huỳnh Hồng Sơn =

Vietnamese footballer (born 1974)

Personal information
- Full name: Huỳnh Hồng Sơn
- Date of birth: 27 April 1969 (age 57)
- Place of birth: Saigon, South Vietnam
- Height: 1.72 m (5 ft 8 in)
- Position: Striker

Youth career
- 1984–1991: Cảng Sài Gòn

Senior career*
Years	Team	Apps	(Gls)
1992–2005	Cảng Sài Gòn	142	(53)

International career
2001–2002	Vietnam	6	(3)
- * Club domestic league appearances and goals

Huỳnh Hồng Sơn (born 1 April 1974) is a Vietnamese former footballer who is last known to have played as a striker for Cảng Sài Gòn.

== Career ==
Huỳnh spent his entire playing career with Vietnamese side TPHCM and was considered a solid striker for the Vietnam national football team.
