= Phạm Văn Quyến =

Vietnamese footballer (born 1984)

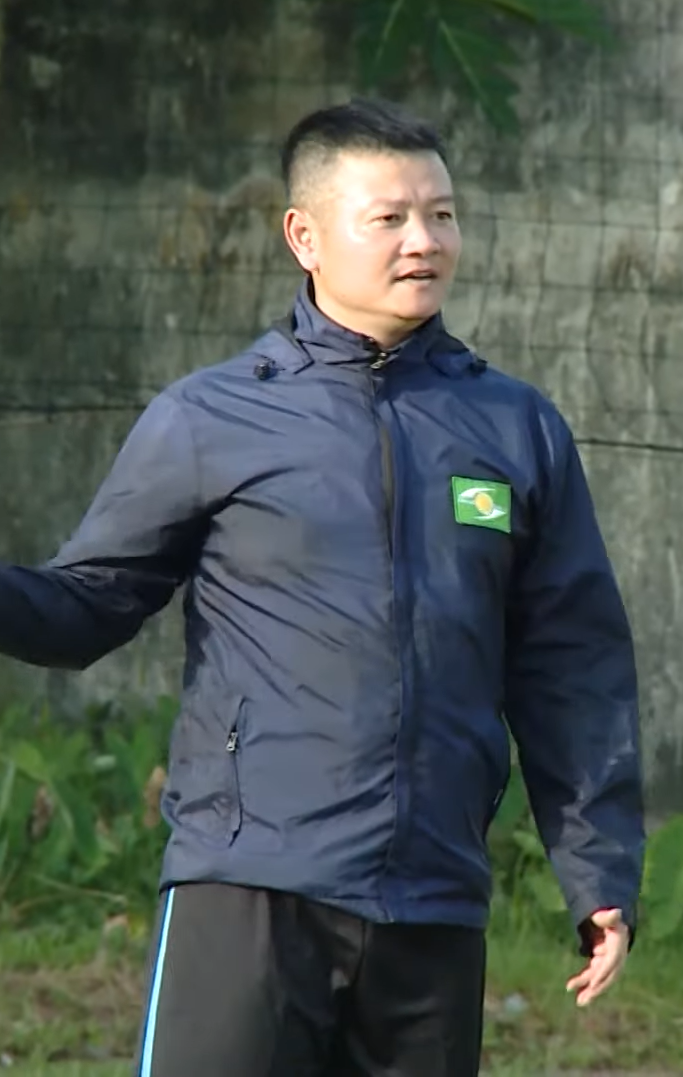
- Văn Quyến in 2021

Personal information
- Date of birth: 29 April 1984 (age 42)
- Place of birth: Hưng Nguyên, Nghệ An, Vietnam
- Height: 1.67 m (5 ft 6 in)
- Position: Forward

Team information
- Current team: Sông Lam Nghệ An (assistant)

Youth career
- 1996–1998: Sông Lam Nghệ An

Senior career*
Years	Team	Apps	(Gls)
1998–2005	Sông Lam Nghệ An	120	(39)
2009–2012	Sông Lam Nghệ An	20	(8)
2012	→ Xuân Thành Sài Gòn (loan)	2	(0)
2012–2014	Vissai Ninh Bình	50	(15)
Total		192	(62)

International career
- Vietnam U16
2003–2005	Vietnam U23	12	(7)
2002–2005	Vietnam	17	(7)

Managerial career
- 2024–: Sông Lam Nghệ An (assistant)
- * Club domestic league appearances and goals

Phạm Văn Quyến (born 29 April 1984) is a Vietnamese former footballer who played as a forward. Since his days as a Vietnamese U-16 international, Văn Quyến was considered one of the most promising young players in Vietnam and a worthy successor to the legendary Lê Huỳnh Đức. Văn Quyến is known for his pace, dribbling ability and shot accuracy and was also a free kick specialist.

== International career ==
In 2000, Phạm Văn Quyến was called up to the U-16 national team. At the end of the tournament, Văn Quyến scored three goals. A year later, he became the youngest player to be named to the U-23 national team in preparation for the SEA Games, but he was soon released due to disciplinary issues.

Early in 2002, Văn Quyến joined the Vietnam U-20 team to participate in the Southeast Asian U-20 Championship held in Thailand and Cambodia. Later, Văn Quyến was called up to the national U-20 team for the U-20 Asian Cup qualifiers and won a ticket to the finals in Qatar. However, Quyến's goals against China (2) and Syria (1) were not enough to help Vietnam reach the quarterfinals. In the same year, he was named in the Vietnam Olympic team to participate in the Asian Games in Busan, South Korea. He made his first official appearance for the Vietnam national team against Cambodia, where he scored one goal in the 9–2 win over their neighbors, helping the Vietnam team win the bronze medal later.

In 2003, Văn Quyến played in the 2004 Summer Olympics qualification round and scored the only goal for the Vietnam Olympic team in the 1–3 loss to Iraq Olympic in the first leg, before drawing 1–1 in the second leg. In the 2004 AFC Asian Cup qualifiers, the Vietnam Football Federation sent the U-23 team to compete as the senior national team to prepare for the 22nd SEA Games. Here, Văn Quyến scored the goal of his career against the South Korea national team in the historic victory of the Vietnam team in Oman on October 19, 2003.

In 2005, Văn Quyến continued to join the Vietnam U-23 team to participate in the 23rd SEA Games in the Philippines. In 2010, he was called back to the senior national team by coach Henrique Calisto to prepare for the 1000th Anniversary of Thăng Long - Hanoi Football Cup. But after just two training sessions with the team, Văn Quyến's ankle injury recurred and was diagnosed as requiring 6 months to recover, meaning he missed the opportunity to participate in this tournament and the 2010 AFF Cup.

== Coaching career ==
After retiring, Văn Quyến graduated with a C-level head coach certificate from the Asian Football Confederation and was assigned to coach the youth teams of Sông Lam Nghệ An.

In 2018, Văn Quyến was appointed as assistant coach to Phan Tiến Hoài, the head coach of the U-11 Sông Lam Nghệ An. In 2019, he served as assistant coach to his former teammate Phan Như Thuật, the head coach of the U-15 Sông Lam Nghệ An. In 2020, he and coach Lê Kỳ Phương led the U-17 Sông Lam Nghệ An team. In these three years, the youth teams of Sông Lam Nghệ An have all achieved success with national championships.

In June 2021, Van Quyen became the assistant to head coach Nguyen Huy Hoang, leading Song Lam Nghe An in the V.League 2021.

== Controversy ==
Phạm Quyến was a part of the Vietnamese U-23 team at the SEA Games 23 in the Philippines. He and several players of the team were arrested for alleged gambling and match-fixing scandals. In January, 2007, it was decided that Quyến would be sentenced to 2 years in prison, ending his hope of becoming a star player. Also, the Vietnam Football Federation (VFF) decided to ban him from all domestic competition for four years. However, it is rumoured that he can return as soon as 2008, if he shows good progress during the banning period. Since the start of V-League 2009, Quyến was able to play in domestic matches.

== Career statistics ==
=== Vietnam U-23 ===
#	Date	Venue	Opponent	Score	Result	Competition
1.	30 November 2003	Hanoi, Mỹ Đình National Stadium	Thailand	1–0	1-1	2003 Southeast Asian Games
2.	9 December 2003	Hanoi, Mỹ Đình National Stadium	Malaysia	2-0	4-3	2003 Southeast Asian Games
3.	9 December 2003	Hanoi, Mỹ Đình National Stadium	Malaysia	3-1	4-3	2003 Southeast Asian Games
4.	12 December 2003	Hanoi, Mỹ Đình National Stadium	Thailand	1–1	1-2	2003 Southeast Asian Games
5.	20 November 2005	Bacolod, Paglaum Sports Complex	Singapore	1-1	2-1	2005 Southeast Asian Games
6.	20 November 2005	Bacolod, Paglaum Sports Complex	Singapore	2-1	2-1	2005 Southeast Asian Games
7.	2 December 2005	Bacolod, Paglaum Sports Complex	Malaysia	1–1	2-1	2005 Southeast Asian Games

=== Vietnam ===
#	Date	Venue	Opponent	Score	Result	Competition
1.	15 December 2002	Gelora Bung Karno Stadium, Jakarta, Indonesia	Cambodia	9–2	9-2	2002 AFF Championship
2.	27 September 2003	Daegu World Cup Stadium, Daegu, South Korea	Nepal	1–0	5–0	2004 AFC Asian Cup qualification
3.	27 September 2003	Daegu World Cup Stadium, Daegu, South Korea	Nepal	2–0	5–0	2004 AFC Asian Cup qualification
4.	27 September 2003	Daegu World Cup Stadium, Daegu, South Korea	Nepal	4–0	5–0	2004 AFC Asian Cup qualification
5.	19 October 2003	Sultan Qaboos Sports Complex, Muscat, Oman	South Korea	1–0	1–0	2004 AFC Asian Cup qualification
6.	18 February 2004	Mỹ Đình National Stadium, Hanoi, Vietnam	Maldives	4–0	4-0	2006 FIFA World Cup qualification
7.	20 August 2004	Thống Nhất Stadium, Hồ Chí Minh City, Vietnam	Myanmar	4–0	5-0	2004 LG Cup

== Honours ==
=== Club ===
Song Lam Nghe An

- V.League 1:

(gold) Winners : 1999-2000, 2000-2001, 2011
(silver) Runners-up : 2001-2002

- Vietnamese Super Cup:

(gold) Winners : 2000, 2001, 2002, 2011

- Vietnamese National Cup:

(gold) Winners : 2002, 2010

Xuan Thanh Sai Gon

- Vietnamese National Cup:

(gold) Winners : 2012

Vissai Ninh Binh

- Vietnamese National Cup:

(gold) Winners : 2013

- Vietnamese Super Cup:

(gold) Winners : 2013

Competition	1st place, gold medalist(s)	2nd place, silver medalist(s)	3rd place, bronze medalist(s)	Total
V.League 1	3	1	0	4
Vietnamese National Cup	4	-	-	4
Vietnamese Super Cup	5	-	-	5
Total	12	1	-	13

=== International ===
Vietnam U16

- Fourth place AFC U-16 Championship: 2000

Vietnam U23

(silver) Runners-up : Southeast Asian Games: 2003, 2005

Vietnam

(bronze) Third place : AFF Championship: 2002

=== Individuals ===
- Vietnamese Golden Ball: 2003
- Best Young Player of Vietnam Football Federation: 2000, 2002
