= Lwin Oo =

Burmese military officer and diplomat

Major General (Retd.) Sithu, Thiri Pyanchi Lwin Oo
- လွင်ဦး

Chairman of the Anti-Corruption Commission of Myanmar
- In office 31 July 2025 – 10 April 2026
- Appointed by: National Defence and Security Council
- President: Min Aung Hlaing (Acting)
- Prime Minister: Nyo Saw
- Preceded by: Sit Aye
- Succeeded by: Soe Thein

Deputy Minister for Foreign Affairs
- In office 25 September 2023 – 31 July 2025

Ambassador of Myanmar to Russia
- In office 17 July 2021 – 25 September 2023
- Preceded by: Ko Ko Shein
- Succeeded by: Thit Linn Ohn

Personal details
- Born: 31 January 1961 (age 65) Myanmar
- Spouse: Myint Thandar
- Education: Defence Services Academy (24th Intake)

Military service
- Allegiance: Myanmar
- Branch/service: Myanmar Air Force
- Years of service: 1981–2015
- Rank: Major General
- Unit: Myanmar Air Force

Lwin Oo ( လွင်ဦး; born 31 January 1961) is a Burmese retired military officer and veteran diplomat who served as the Chairman of the Anti-Corruption Commission of Myanmar. Prior to this role, he held the positions of Deputy Minister for Foreign Affairs and the Myanmar Ambassador to Russia.

== Military career ==
Lwin Oo is a graduate of the Defence Services Academy (24th Intake). He served in the Myanmar Air Force until 2015, concluding his military career with the rank of Major General as the Chief of Staff (Air).

=== 2015 Kokang Incident ===
During the 2015 Kokang offensive, Myanmar Air Force operations resulted in shells and bombs landing within the territory of the People's Republic of China on at least two occasions. Following significant diplomatic pressure and military exercises by China along the border, he was removed from his post as Chief of Staff (Air) by the Commander-in-Chief of Defence Services.

== Diplomatic career ==
In late June 2015, Lwin Oo transitioned from the Air Force to the Ministry of Foreign Affairs with the rank of Ambassador. His diplomatic assignments included:

- Nepal: Served as Ambassador starting in 2015.
- Bangladesh: Transferred as Ambassador on 27 October 2017.
- Philippines: Appointed as Ambassador on 18 November 2019.
- Russia, Belarus, and Kazakhstan: Appointed as Ambassador to Russia on 17 July 2021, and concurrently accredited to Belarus and Kazakhstan on 22 April 2022.

== Political career ==
The State Administration Council appointed him as the Deputy Minister for Foreign Affairs on 25 September 2023. He formally assumed the post after his retirement from the civil service on 11 October 2023.

On 31 July 2025, he was reassigned from his deputy ministerial post to serve as the Chairman of the Anti-Corruption Commission of Myanmar.

== Honors ==
- Excellent Performance in Administration (First Class) (27 March 2022)
- Sithu (17 April 2022)
- Thiri Pyanchi (2 March 2026)
