= 2000 AFF Championship squads =

Association football competition squads

Below are the squads for the 2000 AFF Championship, hosted by Thailand, which took place between 6 and 18 November 2000. The players' listed age is their age on the tournament's opening day (6 November 2000).

== Group A ==
=== Thailand ===
Coach: (England) Peter Withe

No.	Pos.	Player	Date of birth (age)	Caps	Club
1	GK	Wirat Wangchan	25 February 1976 (aged 24)		(Thailand) Sinthana
2	DF	Tanongsak Prajakkata	29 June 1976 (aged 24)		(Thailand) BEC Tero Sasana
3	DF	Niweat Siriwong	18 July 1977 (aged 23)		(Singapore) Gombak United
4	DF	Kovid Foythong	20 April 1974 (aged 26)		(Germany) SV Lohhof
5	DF	Choketawee Promrut	16 March 1975 (aged 25)		(Thailand) Thai Farmer Bank
6	MF	Anurak Srikerd	15 January 1975 (aged 25)		(Thailand) BEC Tero Sasana
7	MF	Chukiat Noosarung	25 June 1971 (aged 29)		(Thailand) Raj Pracha
8	MF	Therdsak Chaiman	29 September 1973 (aged 27)		(Thailand) BEC Tero Sasana
9	FW	Jatupong Thongsukh	12 January 1976 (aged 24)		(Thailand) Raj Vithi
10	MF	Tawan Sripan	13 December 1971 (aged 28)		(Thailand) Bangkok Bank
11	MF	Thawatchai Damrong-Ongtrakul	25 June 1974 (aged 26)		(Singapore) Sembawang Rangers
12	MF	Surachai Jaturapattarapong (c)	20 November 1969 (aged 30)		Stock Exchange of Thailand
13	FW	Kiatisuk Senamuang	11 August 1973 (aged 27)		(England) Huddersfield Town
14	FW	Worrawoot Srimaka	8 December 1971 (aged 28)		(Thailand) BEC Tero Sasana
15	DF	Vittaya Nubthong	25 April 1970 (aged 30)		(Thailand) BEC Tero Sasana
17	DF	Dusit Chalermsan	22 April 1970 (aged 30)		(India) Mohun Bagan AC
18	GK	Pansa Meesatham	26 August 1974 (aged 26)		(Thailand) BEC Tero Sasana
19	FW	Pipat Thonkanya	4 January 1979 (aged 21)		(Thailand) Raj Pracha
20	FW	Seksan Piturat	2 January 1976 (aged 24)		(Thailand) Sinthana
21	MF	Anon Boonsukco	1 April 1978 (aged 22)		(Thailand) Krung Thai Bank
22	GK	Kittisak Rawangpa	3 January 1975 (aged 25)		(Thailand) Sinthana
23	MF	Sutee Suksomkit	5 June 1978 (aged 22)		(Thailand) Thai Farmer Bank
25	MF	Thanunchai Baribarn	3 October 1972 (aged 28)		(Thailand) Provincial Electricity Authority

=== Indonesia ===
Coach: Nandar Iskandar (until 10 November), Dananjaya (since 12 November)

No.	Pos.	Player	Date of birth (age)	Caps	Club
1	GK	Hendro Kartiko	24 April 1973 (aged 27)		(Indonesia) Persebaya Surabaya
2	DF	Budiman Yunus	5 August 1972 (aged 28)		(Indonesia) Persija Jakarta
3	DF	Aji Santoso (c)	6 April 1970 (aged 30)		(Indonesia) Persebaya Surabaya
4	DF	Ismed Sofyan	28 August 1979 (aged 21)		(Indonesia) Persija Jakarta
5	DF	Bejo Sugiantoro	2 April 1977 (aged 23)		(Indonesia) Persebaya Surabaya
6	DF	Eko Purdjianto	1 February 1976 (aged 24)		(Indonesia) Pelita Jaya
7	DF	Suwandi Siswoyo	10 March 1972 (aged 28)		(Indonesia) Persija Jakarta
8	MF	Seto Nurdiantoro	14 April 1974 (aged 26)		(Indonesia) Pelita Jaya
9	MF	Uston Nawawi	6 September 1978 (aged 22)		(Indonesia) Persebaya Surabaya
10	FW	Kurniawan Dwi Yulianto	13 July 1976 (aged 24)		(Indonesia) PSM Makassar
11	MF	Bima Sakti	23 January 1976 (aged 24)		(Indonesia) PSM Makassar
12	MF	Eduard Ivakdalam	19 December 1974 (aged 25)		(Indonesia) Persipura Jayapura
13	GK	I Komang Putra	6 May 1972 (aged 28)		(Indonesia) PSIS Semarang
14	DF	Djet Donald La'ala	13 December 1971 (aged 28)		(Indonesia) PKT Bontang
15	MF	Yaris Riyadi	21 January 1973 (aged 27)		(Indonesia) Persib Bandung
16	MF	Imran Nahumarury	12 November 1978 (aged 21)		(Indonesia) Persita Tangerang
17	MF	I Putu Gede	1 December 1973 (aged 26)		(Indonesia) Arema Malang
18	DF	Warsidi Ardi	22 August 1979 (aged 21)		(Indonesia) Persita Tangerang
19	DF	Nur'alim	27 December 1973 (aged 26)		(Indonesia) Persija Jakarta
20	FW	Bambang Pamungkas	10 June 1980 (aged 20)		(Indonesia) Persija Jakarta
21	FW	Rochy Putiray	26 June 1970 (aged 30)		(Indonesia) Persija Jakarta
22	FW	Gendut Doni Christiawan	7 December 1978 (aged 21)		(Indonesia) Persijatim
23	DF	Slamet Riyadi	15 November 1981 (aged 18)		(Indonesia) PSMS Medan
25	FW	Miro Baldo Bento	4 June 1975 (aged 25)		(Indonesia) PSM Makassar
30	GK	Sahari Gultom	2 November 1977 (aged 23)		(Indonesia) PSMS Medan

=== Myanmar ===
Coach: (England) David Booth

No.	Pos.	Player	Date of birth (age)	Caps	Club
1	GK	Aung Aung Oo	8 June 1982 (aged 18)		(Myanmar) Finance and Revenue
18	GK	Ko Ko Aung	1 October 1975 (aged 25)		(Myanmar)
7	GK	Nay Thu Hlaing	1 December 1982 (aged 17)		(Myanmar)
2	DF	Min Thu	2 June 1979 (aged 21)		(Myanmar) Ministry of Commerce FC
13	DF	Min Thwin	2 September 1983 (aged 17)		(Myanmar)
6	DF	Zaw Lin Tun	20 October 1982 (aged 18)		(Myanmar) Ministry of Commerce FC
12	DF	Min Zaw Oo	12 November 1976 (aged 23)		(Myanmar)
21	DF	Thet Naing Soe	4 July 1982 (aged 18)		(Myanmar)
3	DF	Than Wai	4 January 1976 (aged 24)		(Myanmar)
8	MF	Aung Kyaw Moe	2 July 1982 (aged 18)		(Myanmar) Finance and Revenue
	MF	Tint Naing Tun Thein	22 May 1983 (aged 17)		(Myanmar)
23	MF	Lwin Oo	8 March 1983 (aged 17)		(Myanmar)
15	MF	Kyaw Min	10 February 1976 (aged 24)		(Myanmar)
10	MF	Than Toe Aung	19 January 1968 (aged 32)		(Myanmar)
9	FW	Myo Hlaing Win	24 May 1973 (aged 27)		(Myanmar) Finance and Revenue
4	FW	Soe Myat Min	19 May 1982 (aged 18)		(Myanmar) Finance and Revenue
16	FW	Zaw Htike	28 July 1983 (aged 17)		(Myanmar)
24	FW	Aung Kyaw Tun	5 August 1986 (aged 14)		(Myanmar)
19	FW	Aye Min Tun	2 December 1982 (aged 17)		(Myanmar)

=== Philippines ===
Coach: Rodolfo Alicante

No.	Pos.	Player	Date of birth (age)	Caps	Club
1	GK	Edmundo Mercado	7 June 1974 (aged 26)		(Philippines) Philippine Air Force
5	DF	Raymund Tonog	9 May 1971 (aged 29)		(Philippines) Philippine Air Force
21	DF	Ziggy Tonog	16 July 1976 (aged 24)		(Philippines) Philippine Air Force
4	DF	Marco Nieto	11 November 1974 (aged 25)		(Philippines)
17	DF	Dave Fegidero	15 May 1978 (aged 22)		(Philippines)
14	DF	Wilson de la Cruz	18 May 1979 (aged 21)		(Philippines) Philippine Army
15	DF	Alvin Ocampo	5 August 1977 (aged 23)		(Philippines) Kaya
22	DF	Percian Temporosa	22 October 1979 (aged 21)		(Philippines)
19	MF	Troy Fegidero	27 October 1975 (aged 25)		(Philippines)
10	MF	Norman Fegidero	28 January 1970 (aged 30)		(Philippines) Philippine Air Force
24	MF	Daniel Sledd	15 May 1978 (aged 22)		(Philippines)
8	MF	Marlon Piñero	10 January 1972 (aged 28)		(Philippines)
16	MF	Leigh Gunn	24 December 1980 (aged 19)		(Australia) Bonnyrigg White Eagles
23	MF	Jose Maria Cabalfin	17 November 1977 (aged 22)		(Philippines)
6	FW	Alfredo Razon Gonzalez	1 October 1978 (aged 22)		(Philippines) Kaya
11	FW	Yanti Barsales	6 February 1973 (aged 27)		(Philippines) Philippine Air Force
12	FW	Jimmy Doña	10 May 1978 (aged 22)		(Philippines) Philippine Navy
7	FW	Ali Go	21 September 1976 (aged 24)		(Philippines)
9	MF	Pablo Lobregat			(Philippines)
18	GK	Victorino Troyo	5 October 1969 (aged 31)		(Philippines)

== Group B ==
=== Vietnam ===
Coach: (Austria) Alfred Riedl

No.	Pos.	Player	Date of birth (age)	Caps	Club
1	GK	Võ Văn Hạnh	10 April 1974 (aged 26)		(Vietnam) Sông Lam Nghệ An
2	DF	Mai Tiến Dũng	1 July 1974 (aged 26)		(Vietnam) Thể Công
5	MF	Võ Hoàng Bửu	10 July 1968 (aged 32)		(Vietnam) Cảng Sài Gòn
6	DF	Nguyễn Đức Thắng	28 May 1976 (aged 24)		(Vietnam) Thể Công
7	DF	Đỗ Văn Khải	1 April 1974 (aged 26)		(Vietnam) Hải Quan
8	MF	Nguyễn Hồng Sơn	9 October 1970 (aged 30)		(Vietnam) Thể Công
9	FW	Vũ Công Tuyền	17 May 1969 (aged 31)		(Vietnam) Hồ Chí Minh City
10	FW	Lê Huỳnh Đức (c)	20 April 1972 (aged 28)		(China) Chongqing Dangdai Lifan
11	MF	Nguyễn Văn Sỹ	21 November 1971 (aged 28)		(Vietnam) Nam Định
12	DF	Phạm Như Thuần	22 October 1975 (aged 25)		(Vietnam) Thể Công
14	FW	Văn Sỹ Thủy	18 October 1974 (aged 26)		(Vietnam) Thể Công
15	DF	Nguyễn Quốc Trung	10 April 1979 (aged 21)		(Vietnam) Thể Công
16	GK	Trần Minh Quang	19 April 1973 (aged 27)		(Vietnam) Bình Định
17	MF	Triệu Quang Hà	3 September 1975 (aged 25)		(Vietnam) Thể Công
18	MF	Vũ Minh Hiếu	11 June 1972 (aged 28)		(Vietnam) Hà Nội
19	MF	Bùi Trần Quang Huy	28 August 1971 (aged 29)		(Vietnam) Hà Nội
20	DF	Trần Công Minh	1 September 1970 (aged 30)		(Vietnam) Đồng Tháp
21	FW	Ngô Quang Trường	21 January 1972 (aged 28)		(Vietnam) Sông Lam Nghệ An
22	GK	Nguyễn Vũ Dũng	14 January 1979 (aged 21)		(Vietnam) Đà Nẵng
23	DF	Phạm Hùng Dũng	28 September 1978 (aged 22)		(Vietnam) Đà Nẵng

=== Malaysia ===
Coach: Abdul Rahman Ibrahim

No.	Pos.	Player	Date of birth (age)	Caps	Club
1	GK	Kamarulzaman Haji Hassan	17 January 1979 (aged 21)		(Malaysia) Penang
3	DF	Ahmad Shaharuddin Rosdi	22 May 1975 (aged 25)		(Malaysia) Pahang
4	DF	Rajanikandh s/o Batumalai	2 October 1974 (aged 26)		(Malaysia) Selangor
5	DF	Mohammad Ali Tahar	30 November 1973 (aged 26)		(Malaysia) Pahang
7	MF	Ahmad Shahrul Azhar Sofian	24 October 1974 (aged 26)		(Malaysia) Perak
8	MF	Bobby Pian Maihah	26 May 1972 (aged 28)		(Malaysia) Sarawak
9	FW	Mohd Rusdi Suparman	27 January 1973 (aged 27)		(Malaysia) Selangor
10	FW	Mohd Nizaruddin Yusof	10 November 1979 (aged 20)		(Malaysia) Selangor
11	MF	Suresh Kumar	13 November 1971 (aged 28)		(Malaysia) Penang
12	MF	Mohd Shukor Adan	24 September 1979 (aged 21)		(Malaysia) Negeri Sembilan
13	MF	Mohd Anuar Jusoh	15 March 1972 (aged 28)		(Malaysia) Kuala Muda Naza
15	FW	Khairil Zainal	12 February 1974 (aged 26)		(Malaysia) Penang
16	MF	Jaafar Salleh	29 February 1980 (aged 20)		(Malaysia) Selangor
18	DF	Rosdi Talib	11 January 1976 (aged 24)		(Malaysia) Terengganu
19	FW	Azman Adnan	1 November 1971 (aged 29)		(Malaysia) Selangor
20	FW	Hairuddin Omar	29 September 1979 (aged 21)		(Malaysia) Terengganu
21	GK	Azmin Azram Abdul Aziz	1 April 1976 (aged 24)		(Malaysia) Selangor
22	DF	Leong Hong Seng	3 February 1975 (aged 25)		(Malaysia) Negeri Sembilan
23	DF	Abdul Ghani Malik	25 May 1972 (aged 28)		(Malaysia) Terengganu
24	GK	Mohd Hamsani Ahmad	25 February 1976 (aged 24)		(Malaysia) Negeri Sembilan
25	DF	Bahtiar Othman	10 September 1975 (aged 25)		(Malaysia) Johor
26	MF	Yakob Aris			(Malaysia) ATM
27	MF	Ramos Sari	4 November 1967 (aged 33)		(Malaysia) Sarawak
28	MF	Suthesh Nair	27 April 1974 (aged 26)		(Malaysia) Johor

=== Singapore ===
Coach: Vincent V. s/o Subramaniam

No.	Pos.	Player	Date of birth (age)	Caps	Club
1	GK	Mohd Rezal Hassan	14 February 1974 (aged 26)		Singapore Armed Forces
2	DF	Robin Chitrakar	2 October 1976 (aged 24)		(Singapore) Geylang United
3	MF	Mohd Rafi Ali	11 December 1972 (aged 27)		Singapore Armed Forces
5	DF	Aide Iskandar Sahak	28 May 1975 (aged 25)		(Singapore) Home United
6	DF	Subramani s/o Shunmugam	5 August 1972 (aged 28)		(Singapore) Home United
7	FW	Steven Tan Teng Chuan	28 December 1970 (aged 29)		(Singapore) Tanjong Pagar United
8	FW	Tan Kim Leng	5 September 1977 (aged 23)		Singapore Armed Forces
9	FW	Ahmad Latiff Khamaruddin	29 May 1979 (aged 21)		(Indonesia) Persikabo Bogor
10	FW	Indra Sahdan Daud	5 March 1979 (aged 21)		(Singapore) Geylang United
11	MF	Basri Halis	24 November 1975 (aged 24)		(Singapore) Tanjong Pagar United
12	DF	Zulkarnaen Zainal	1 October 1973 (aged 27)		(Singapore) Geylang United
13	DF	Sasikumar s/o Ramu	5 March 1975 (aged 25)		(Singapore) Home United
14	MF	Gusta Guzarishah	29 April 1976 (aged 24)		(Singapore) Home United
15	DF	Mohd Nazri Nasir	17 January 1971 (aged 29)		Singapore Armed Forces
18	MF	Sharifuddin Mahmood	4 August 1975 (aged 25)		
19	FW	Mohd Noor Ali	16 May 1975 (aged 25)		(Singapore) Geylang United
21	MF	Hasrin Jailani	22 November 1975 (aged 24)		(Singapore) Home United
22	GK	Yazid Yasin	24 June 1979 (aged 21)		(Singapore) Home United

=== Cambodia ===
Coach: (Germany) Joachim Fickert

No.	Pos.	Player	Date of birth (age)	Caps	Club
1	GK	Soun Dara	5 October 1974 (aged 26)		(Cambodia)
24	GK	Ka Vandy	5 August 1981 (aged 19)		(Cambodia)
2	DF	Neang Tithmesa	6 April 1983 (aged 17)		(Cambodia)
4	DF	Chea Sameth	11 April 1972 (aged 28)		(Cambodia)
5	DF	Choun Maline	15 July 1970 (aged 30)		(Cambodia)
6	DF	Peas Sothy	15 December 1979 (aged 20)		(Cambodia)
15	DF	Pros Him	1 August 1976 (aged 24)		(Cambodia)
17	DF	Soeur Chanveasna	10 November 1978 (aged 21)		(Cambodia)
19	MF	Rith Dika	16 April 1982 (aged 18)		(Cambodia)
7	MF	Ung Kanyanith	12 December 1982 (aged 17)		(Cambodia)
8	MF	Pok Chantan	1 December 1982 (aged 17)		(Cambodia)
11	MF	Ieng Saknida	17 March 1980 (aged 20)		(Cambodia)
12	MF	Samel Nasa	25 April 1984 (aged 16)		(Cambodia)
13	MF	Meas Channa	20 July 1983 (aged 17)		(Cambodia)
14	MF	Kao Nisai	15 April 1980 (aged 20)		(Cambodia)
9	FW	Hok Sochetra	27 July 1974 (aged 26)		(Cambodia)
10	FW	Chea Makara	20 April 1983 (aged 17)		(Cambodia)
16	FW	Chan Arunreath	1 July 1973 (aged 27)		(Cambodia)

=== Laos ===
Coach: Outhensakda Vatthana

No.	Pos.	Player	Date of birth (age)	Caps	Club
20	GK	Vannasith Thilavongsa	21 May 1983 (aged 17)		(Laos)
22	GK	Soulivanh Saenvilay	14 March 1963 (aged 37)		(Laos)
2	DF	Khamsay Chanthavong	28 March 1972 (aged 28)		(Laos)
3	DF	Phonepadith Xayavong	1 March 1972 (aged 28)		(Laos)
4	DF	Vilaiphone Xayavong	4 September 1973 (aged 27)		(Laos)
6	DF	Ananh Thepsouvanh	21 October 1981 (aged 19)		(Laos)
12	DF	Phetsalath Sonephet	12 July 1981 (aged 19)		(Laos)
14	DF	Bandith Sithanyalath	2 June 1983 (aged 17)		(Laos)
19	DF	Khemphet Sengphanith	9 October 1980 (aged 20)		(Laos)
8	MF	Sonesavanh Insisengway	28 June 1969 (aged 31)		(Laos)
5	MF	Chalana Luang-Amath	10 May 1972 (aged 28)		(Laos) MCTPC FC
10	MF	Saysana Savatdy	25 March 1963 (aged 37)		(Laos)
11	MF	Bounvong Vannabouathong	30 November 1981 (aged 18)		(Laos)
15	MF	Khonesavanh Homsombath	23 October 1972 (aged 28)		(Laos)
18	FW	Nitinay Nanthapaseuth	24 September 1972 (aged 28)		(Laos)
9	FW	Bounlap Khenkitisack	19 June 1966 (aged 34)		(Laos)
13	FW	Keolakhone Channiphone	10 January 1970 (aged 30)		(Laos)
16	FW	Kholadeth Phonephachan	20 October 1980 (aged 20)		(Laos)
