= Indonesia national football team results (2000–2009) =

This is a list of Indonesia national football team results from 2000 to 2009.

== Results ==
Key
Win
Draw
Defeat

=== 2000 ===
13 October 2000 AFC Asian Cup Group B	Kuwait	0–0	Indonesia	Tripoli, Lebanon
19:45 UTC+3		Report		Stadium: International Olympic Stadium; Attendance: 2,000; Referee: Tajaddin Fares (Syria)

16 October 2000 AFC Asian Cup Group B	China	4–0	Indonesia	Tripoli, Lebanon
17:00 UTC+3	Li Ming 2'; Shen Si 7' (pen.); Yang Chen 10'; Qi Hong 90'	Report		Stadium: International Olympic Stadium; Attendance: 2,000; Referee: Nabil Ayad (Lebanon)

19 October 2000 AFC Asian Cup Group B	South Korea	3–0	Indonesia	Beirut, Lebanon
19:30 UTC+3	Lee Dong-gook 30', 76', 90+1'	Report		Stadium: Sports City Stadium; Attendance: 500; Referee: Toru Kamikawa (Japan)

1 November Friendly	Singapore	1–0	Indonesia	Kallang, Singapore
--:-- UTC+8	Goal			Stadium: National Stadium

6 November 2000 AFF Cup Group A	Indonesia	3–0	Philippines	Chiang Mai, Thailand
16:00 UTC+7	Aji 31'; Kurniawan 58'; Purdjianto 84'			Stadium: 700th Anniversary Stadium; Referee: Mohd Nazri Abdullah (Malaysia)

10 November 2000 AFF Cup Group A	Thailand	4–1	Indonesia	Chiang Mai, Thailand
19:00 UTC+7	Worrawoot 25', 49'; Kiatisuk 52'; Chalermsan 79'		Gendut 57'	Stadium: 700th Anniversary Stadium; Referee: Mohd Nazri Abdullah (Malaysia)

12 November 2000 AFF Cup Group A	Myanmar	0–5	Indonesia	Chiang Mai, Thailand
16:00 UTC+7			Gendut 43', 57'; Uston 70'; Kurniawan 74', 82'	Stadium: 700th Anniversary Stadium; Referee: S. Kumbalingam Kennedy (Singapore)

16 November 2000 AFF Cup Semi-finals	Vietnam	2–3 (a.e.t.)	Indonesia	Bangkok, Thailand
16:00 UTC+7	Nguyễn Hồng Sơn 45'; Vũ Công Tuyền 90'		Gendut 39' 120'; Nurdiantoro 75'	Stadium: Rajamangala Stadium; Referee: S. Kumbalingam Kennedy (Singapore)

18 November 2000 AFF Cup Final	Thailand	4–1	Indonesia	Bangkok, Thailand
19:00 UTC+7	Worrawoot 14', 18', 32'; Tanongsak 65'		Uston 20'	Stadium: Rajamangala Stadium; Referee: Mohd Nazri Abdullah (Malaysia)

=== 2001 ===
8 April 2002 FIFA World Cup qualification	Indonesia	5–0	Maldives	Jakarta, Indonesia
16:00 UTC+7	Setyabudi 7'; Kurniawan 13'; Bima 51'; Uston 61'; Bambang 67'	Report		Stadium: Gelora Bung Karno Stadium; Attendance: 30,000; Referee: Santhan Nagalingam (Singapore)

22 April 2002 FIFA World Cup qualification	Indonesia	6–0	Cambodia	Jakarta, Indonesia
16:00 UTC+7	Nasa 26' (o.g.); Uston 42', 46', 71'; Tecuari 73'; Kurniawan 76'	Report		Stadium: Gelora Bung Karno Stadium; Attendance: 32,000; Referee: Jerry Andres (Philippines)

29 April 2002 FIFA World Cup qualification	Cambodia	0–2	Indonesia	Phnom Penh, Cambodia
15:30 UTC+7		Report	Purdjianto 78'; Bambang 87'	Stadium: Lambert Stadium; Attendance: 7,000; Referee: Michael Andrews (India)

6 May 2002 FIFA World Cup qualification	Maldives	0–2	Indonesia	Malé, Maldives
16:00 UTC+5		Report	Kurniawan 10'; Sofyan 50'	Stadium: Rasmee Dhandu Stadium; Attendance: 11,576; Referee: Sultan Mujalli Al Aalaq (Bahrain)

13 May 2002 FIFA World Cup qualification	China	5–1	Indonesia	Kunming, China
15:15 UTC+8	Li Weifeng 50'; Yang Chen 62'; Xie Hui 71', 90'; Qi Hong 82'	Report	Kurniawan 40'	Stadium: Kunming Tuodong Sports Center; Attendance: 37,000; Referee: Toru Kamikawa (Japan)

27 May 2002 FIFA World Cup qualification	Indonesia	0–2	China	Jakarta, Indonesia
16:00 UTC+7		Report	Xie Hui 45'; Wu Chengying 69'	Stadium: Gelora Bung Karno Stadium; Attendance: 50,000; Referee: Saad Kameel Mane (Kuwait)

=== 2002 ===
10 November Tiger Beer Challenge Trophy	Singapore	1–1 (a.e.t.) (4–3 p)	Indonesia	Kallang, Singapore
--:-- UTC+8	Fadzuhasny 38'	Report	Nahumarury 80'	Stadium: National Stadium

15 December 2002 AFF Cup Group A	Indonesia	0–0	Myanmar	Jakarta, Indonesia
17:05 UTC+7				Stadium: Gelora Bung Karno Stadium; Attendance: 40,000; Referee: Abdulhameed Ibrahim (Bahrain)

17 December 2002 AFF Cup Group A	Cambodia	4–2	Indonesia	Jakarta, Indonesia
18:35 UTC+7	Sochetra 15', 45'		Zaenal 35'; Bambang 58', 79', 80'	Stadium: Gelora Bung Karno Stadium; Attendance: 20,000; Referee: Khanthachai Virat (Thailand)

21 December 2002 AFF Cup Group A	Indonesia	2–2	Vietnam	Jakarta, Indonesia
18:35 UTC+7	Budi 12'; Zaenal 83'		Phan Văn Tài Em 53'; Lê Huỳnh Đức 59'	Stadium: Gelora Bung Karno Stadium; Attendance: 30,000; Referee: Subkhiddin Mohd Salleh (Malaysia)

23 December 2002 AFF Cup Group A	Philippines	1–13	Indonesia	Jakarta, Indonesia
18:35 UTC+7	Go 78'		Bambang 1', 29', 35', 82'; Zaenal 6', 38', 41', 57'; Budi 16'; Sugiantoro 55', 75'; Nahumarury 81'; Licuanan 88' (o.g.)	Stadium: Gelora Bung Karno Stadium; Attendance: 50,340; Referee: Khanthachai Virat (Thailand)

27 December 2002 AFF Cup Semi-finals	Malaysia	0–1	Indonesia	Jakarta, Indonesia
19:00 UTC+7			Bambang 75'	Stadium: Gelora Bung Karno Stadium; Attendance: 50,000; Referee: Abdulhameed Ibrahim (Bahrain)

29 December 2002 AFF Cup Final	Thailand	2–2 (a.e.t.) (4–2 p)	Indonesia	Jakarta, Indonesia
19:00 UTC+7	Chukiat 26'; Therdsak 38'		Yaris 46'; Gendut 79'	Stadium: Gelora Bung Karno Stadium; Attendance: 100,000; Referee: Subkhiddin Mohd Salleh (Malaysia)
	Penalties
	Kiatisuk (penalty missed); Sakda (penalty scored); Therdsak (penalty scored); Manit (penalty scored); Dusit (penalty scored)		(penalty scored) Bambang; (penalty missed) Sugiantoro; (penalty missed) Firmansyah; (penalty scored) Imran

=== 2003 ===
26 September Friendly	Malaysia	1–1	Indonesia	Kuala Lumpur, Malaysia
--:-- UTC+8	Fadzli 79'		Elie 61'	Stadium: Bukit Jalil National Stadium

6 October 2004 AFC Asian Cup qualification	Indonesia	2–0	Bhutan	Jeddah, Saudi Arabia
--:-- UTC+3	Kurniawan 19'; Zaenal 48'	Report		Stadium: Prince Abdullah Al Faisal Stadium

8 October 2004 AFC Asian Cup qualification	Yemen	0–3	Indonesia	Jeddah, Saudi Arabia
--:-- UTC+3		Report	Uston 51', 89'; Zaenal 70'	Stadium: Prince Abdullah Al Faisal Stadium

10 October 2004 AFC Asian Cup qualification	Saudi Arabia	5–0	Indonesia	Jeddah, Saudi Arabia
--:-- UTC+3	Al-Meshal 38', 55', 56'; Al Bashah 47', 49'	Report		Stadium: Prince Abdullah Al Faisal Stadium; Referee: Mohamad Mansour (Lebanon)

13 October 2004 AFC Asian Cup qualification	Bhutan	0–2	Indonesia	Jeddah, Saudi Arabia
--:-- UTC+3		Report	Ivakdalam 19'; Zaenal 33'	Stadium: Prince Abdullah Al Faisal Stadium

15 October 2004 AFC Asian Cup qualification	Indonesia	2–2	Yemen	Jeddah, Saudi Arabia
--:-- UTC+3	Ivakdalam 12' (pen.); Zaenal 38'	Report	Al-Salimi 1' (pen.); Al-Amki 56'	Stadium: Prince Abdullah Al Faisal Stadium

17 October 2004 AFC Asian Cup qualification	Indonesia	0–6	Saudi Arabia	Jeddah, Saudi Arabia
--:-- UTC+3		Report	Al-Meshal 21', 86'; Al-Shalhoub 45'; Noor 58'; Al-Dosary 87'; Al-Janoubi 89'	Stadium: Prince Abdullah Al Faisal Stadium; Referee: Nail Lutfullin (Uzbekistan)

=== 2004 ===
12 February Friendly	Jordan	2–1	Indonesia	Amman, Jordan
--:-- UTC+3			Bambang	Stadium: Amman International Stadium

18 February 2006 FIFA World Cup qualification	Saudi Arabia	3–0	Indonesia	Riyadh, Arab Saudi
20:15 UTC+3	Sowed 4', 39'; Al-Qahtani 45'	Report		Stadium: King Fahd International Stadium; Attendance: 1,000; Referee: Naser Al Ghafary (Jordan)

17 March Friendly	Malaysia	0–0	Indonesia	Johor Bahru, Malaysia
--:-- UTC+8				Stadium: Tan Sri Dato' Haji Hassan Yunos Stadium

31 March 2006 FIFA World Cup qualification	Turkmenistan	3–1	Indonesia	Ashgabat, Turkmenistan
19:00 UTC+5	W. Baýramow 10', 74'; Kulyýew 35'	Report	Budi 30'	Stadium: Olympic Stadium; Attendance: 5,000; Referee: Muhammad Sahib (Iraq)

3 June Friendly	Indonesia	1–1	India	Jakarta, Indonesia
--:-- UTC+7	Ponaryo 32'	Report	Ancheri 87' (pen.)	Stadium: Gelora Bung Karno Stadium; Attendance: 5,000

9 June 2006 FIFA World Cup qualification	Indonesia	1–0	Sri Lanka	Jakarta, Indonesia
19:00 UTC+7	Elie 30'	Report		Stadium: Gelora Bung Karno Stadium; Attendance: 30,000; Referee: Ibrahim Nesar (Bangladesh)

18 July 2004 AFC Asian Cup Group A	Qatar	1–2	Indonesia	Beijing, China
17:00 UTC+8	M. Mohamed 83'	Report	Budi 26'; Ponaryo 48'	Stadium: Workers Stadium; Attendance: 5,000; Referee: Masoud Moradi (Iran)

21 July 2004 AFC Asian Cup Group A	Indonesia	0–5	China	Beijing, China
21:00 UTC+8		Report	Shao Jiayi 25', 66'; Hao Haidong 40'; Li Ming 51'; Li Yi 80'	Stadium: Workers Stadium; Attendance: 48,000; Referee: Talaat Najm (Lebanon)

25 July 2004 AFC Asian Cup Group A	Bahrain	3–1	Indonesia	Jinan, China
19:00 UTC+8	Ali 43'; A. Hubail 57'; Yousef 82'	Report	Elie 75'	Stadium: Shandong Sports Center; Attendance: 20,000; Referee: Coffi Codjia (Benin)

4 September Friendly	Singapore	2–0	Indonesia	Kallang, Singapore
--:-- UTC+8	Alam Shah; Sahdan Daud			Stadium: National Stadium

8 September 2006 FIFA World Cup qualification	Sri Lanka	2–2	Indonesia	Colombo, Sri Lanka
18:30 UTC+5:30	Steinwall 81'; Karunaratne 82'	Report	Ilham 8'; Sofyan 51'	Stadium: Sugathadasa Stadium; Attendance: 4,000; Referee: Marshoud Hassan (Jordan)

12 October 2006 FIFA World Cup qualification	Indonesia	1–3	Saudi Arabia	Jakarta, Indonesia
19:30 UTC+7	Ilham 50'	Report	Al-Meshal 9'; Abdulghani 13'; Al-Qahtani 80'	Stadium: Gelora Bung Karno Stadium; Attendance: 30,000; Referee: Subkhiddin Mohd Salleh (Malaysia)

17 November 2006 FIFA World Cup qualification	Indonesia	3–1	Turkmenistan	Jakarta, Indonesia
19:30 UTC+7	Ilham 20', 47', 59'	Report	Durdyýew 25'	Stadium: Gelora Bung Karno Stadium; Attendance: 15,000; Referee: Shaban Qasem (Kuwait)

7 December 2004 AFF Cup Group A	Laos	0–6	Indonesia	Ho Chi Minh City, Vietnam
17:00 UTC+7			Boaz 25', 52'; Ilham 28', 33'; Elie 60'; Kurniawan 86'	Stadium: Thống Nhất Stadium; Referee: Rungklay Mongkol (Thailand)

9 December 2004 AFF Cup Group A	Indonesia	0–0	Singapore	Ho Chi Minh City, Vietnam
19:30 UTC+7				Stadium: Thống Nhất Stadium; Referee: Kwon Jong-Chul (Korea Republic)

11 December 2004 AFF Cup Group A	Vietnam	0–3	Indonesia	Hanoi, Vietnam
19:30 UTC+7			Muhammad 18'; Boaz 21'; Ilham 45'	Stadium: Mỹ Đình National Stadium; Referee: Abdulhameed Ebrahim (Bahrain)

13 December 2004 AFF Cup Group A	Indonesia	8–0	Cambodia	Hanoi, Vietnam
19:30 UTC+7	Ilham 5', 48', 56'; Elie 30', 55'; Kurniawan 74', 76'; Ortizan 90'			Stadium: Mỹ Đình National Stadium; Referee: Sun Baojie (China)

28 December 2004 AFF Cup Semi-finals 1st Leg	Indonesia	1–2	Malaysia	Jakarta, Indonesia
19:45 UTC+7	Kurniawan 6'		Liew 28', 47'	Stadium: Gelora Bung Karno Stadium; Referee: Ravshan Irmatov (Uzbekistan)

=== 2005 ===
3 January 2004 AFF Cup Semi-finals 2nd Leg	Malaysia	1–4	Indonesia	Kuala Lumpur, Malaysia
20:00 UTC+8	Khalid 28'		Kurniawan 59'; Charis 74'; Ilham 77'; Boaz 84'	Stadium: Bukit Jalil National Stadium; Referee: Kunsuta Chaiwat (Thailand)
Note: This match was moved by two days from 1 January 2005 as a mark for respect for the victims of the Indian Ocean tsunami catastrophe.

8 January 2004 AFF Cup Finals 1st Leg	Indonesia	1–3	Singapore	Jakarta, Indonesia
19:45 UTC+7	Mahyadi 90'		Bennett 3'; Khairul 39'; Casmir 69'	Stadium: Gelora Bung Karno Stadium; Referee: Kwon Jong-Chul (Korea Republic)

16 January 2004 AFF Cup Finals 2nd Leg	Singapore	2–1	Indonesia	Kallang, Singapore
19:45 UTC+8	Indra 6'; Casmir 41' (pen.)		Elie 77'	Stadium: National Stadium; Referee: Khalil Al Ghamdi (Saudi Arabia)

29 March Friendly	Australia	3–0	Indonesia	Perth, Australia
--:-- UTC+8	Milicic 25', 58'; Zdrilic 85'	Report		Stadium: Subiaco Oval; Attendance: 13,719; Referee: Hirofumi Yamanishi (Japan)

=== 2006 ===
23 August 2006 Merdeka Tournament	Malaysia	1–1	Indonesia	Selangor, Malaysia
20:30 UTC+8	Ridwan 77' (o.g.)	Report	Bambang 15'	Stadium: Shah Alam Stadium

25 August 2006 Merdeka Tournament	Indonesia	0–0	Myanmar	Selangor, Malaysia
18:30 UTC+8		Report		Stadium: Shah Alam Stadium

29 August 2006 Merdeka Tournament Final	Myanmar	2–1	Indonesia	Selangor, Malaysia
20:30 UTC+8	Kyaw Thu Ra 61'; Soe Myat Min 85'	Report	Zaenal 87'	Stadium: Shah Alam Stadium

=== 2007 ===
13 January 2007 AFF Cup Group B	Indonesia	3–1	Laos	Kallang, Singapore
17:30 UTC+8	Atep 51', 75'; Saktiawan 67'	Report	Saysongkham 13'	Stadium: National Stadium

15 January 2007 AFF Cup Group B	Indonesia	1–1	Vietnam	Kallang, Singapore
17:30 UTC+8	Saktiawan 90'	Report	Supardi 35' (o.g.)	Stadium: National Stadium; Attendance: 4,500; Referee: Mohamed Shahbuddin (Brunei)

17 January 2007 AFF Cup Group B	Singapore	2–2	Indonesia	Kallang, Singapore
20:00 UTC+8	Alam Shah 10' (pen.); Indra Sahdan 52'	Report	Ilham 27'; Zaenal 56'	Stadium: National Stadium; Attendance: 13,819; Referee: Chanwalit Sananwai (Thailand)

1 June Friendly	Indonesia	3–0	Hong Kong	Jakarta, Indonesia
--:-- UTC+7	Bambang 54'; Man P.T. 52' (o.g.); Arif 75'	Report		Stadium: Gelora Bung Karno Stadium

3 June Friendly	Indonesia	0–1	Singapore	Jakarta, Indonesia
--:-- UTC+7		Report		Stadium: Gelora Bung Karno Stadium

21 June Friendly	Indonesia	2–1	Jamaica	Jakarta, Indonesia
--:-- UTC+7	Bambang 21', 78'	Report	Wolfe 72'	Stadium: Gelora Bung Karno Stadium

24 June Friendly	Indonesia	0–1	Oman	Jakarta, Indonesia
--:-- UTC+7		Report	Al-Mukhaini 56'	Stadium: Gelora Bung Karno Stadium

10 July 2007 AFC Asian Cup Group D	Indonesia	2–1	Bahrain	Jakarta, Indonesia
17:15 UTC+7	Budi 14'; Bambang 64'	Report	Mahmood 27'	Stadium: Gelora Bung Karno Stadium; Attendance: 60,000; Referee: Yuichi Nishimura (Japan)

14 July 2007 AFC Asian Cup Group D	Saudi Arabia	2–1	Indonesia	Jakarta, Indonesia
19:30 UTC+7	Y. Al-Qahtani 12'; Al-Harthi 90'	Report	Elie 17'	Stadium: Gelora Bung Karno Stadium; Attendance: 88,000; Referee: Ali Al-Badwawi (United Arab Emirates)

18 July 2007 AFC Asian Cup Group D	Indonesia	0–1	South Korea	Jakarta, Indonesia
17:15 UTC+7		Report	Kim Jung-woo 34'	Stadium: Gelora Bung Karno Stadium; Attendance: 88,000; Referee: Mark Shield (Australia)

9 November 2010 FIFA World Cup qualification	Indonesia	1–4	Syria	Jakarta, Indonesia
19:30 UTC+7	Budi 39'	Report	Esmaeel 17'; Al Zeno 34'; Chaabo 43'; Rafe 90+3'	Stadium: Gelora Bung Karno Stadium; Attendance: 35,000; Referee: Mohsen Torky (Iran)

18 November 2010 FIFA World Cup qualification	Syria	7–0	Indonesia	Damascus, Syria
14:00 UTC+2	Chaabo 40', 44', 87'; Rafe 60', 72', 90'; Al Hussain 81' (pen.)	Report		Stadium: Abbasiyyin Stadium; Attendance: 5,000; Referee: Sun Baojie (China)

=== 2008 ===
25 April Friendly	Indonesia	1–0	Yemen	Bandung, Indonesia
--:-- UTC+7	Bambang 61'	Report		Stadium: Siliwangi Stadium

7 June Friendly	Indonesia	1–1	Malaysia	Surabaya, Indonesia
--:-- UTC+7	Bambang 25' (pen.)	Report	Shukor 32'	Stadium: Gelora 10 November Stadium

11 June Friendly	Indonesia	1–0	Vietnam	Surabaya, Indonesia
--:-- UTC+7	Bambang 12' (pen.)	Report		Stadium: Gelora 10 November Stadium

21 August 2008 Indonesia Independence Cup	Cambodia	0–7	Indonesia	Jakarta, Indonesia
21:15 UTC+7			Charis 8'; Budi 11', 28', 30', 36'; M. Ilham 51'; Bambang 88'	Stadium: Gelora Bung Karno Stadium; Attendance: 1,200

25 August 2008 Indonesia Independence Cup	Indonesia	4–0	Myanmar	Jakarta, Indonesia
22:30 UTC+7	Arif 6', 19'; Budi 48'; Bambang 77'	Report		Stadium: Gelora Bung Karno Stadium

11 November 2008 Grand Royal Challenge Cup	Bangladesh	0–2	Indonesia	Yangon, Myanmar
--:-- UTC+6:30		Report	Firman 10'; Musafri 45'	Stadium: Thuwunna YTC Stadium

15 November 2008 Grand Royal Challenge Cup	Myanmar	2–1	Indonesia	Yangon, Myanmar
--:-- UTC+6:30	Yan Paing 44'; Kyaw Thi Ha 65'	Report	Sofyan 38'	Stadium: Thuwunna YTC Stadium

21 November 2008 Grand Royal Challenge Cup	Myanmar	2–1	Indonesia	Yangon, Myanmar
--:-- UTC+6:30	Soe Myat Min 3', 63'	Report	Moe Win 14' (o.g.)	Stadium: Thuwunna YTC Stadium; Attendance: 20,000

5 December 2008 AFF Cup Group A	Indonesia	3–0	Myanmar	Jakarta, Indonesia
19:30 UTC+7	Budi 24'; Firman 28'; Bambang 64'			Stadium: Gelora Bung Karno Stadium; Attendance: 40,000; Referee: Ramachandran Krishnan (Malaysia)

7 December 2008 AFF Cup Group A	Cambodia	0–4	Indonesia	Jakarta, Indonesia
19:30 UTC+7		Report	Budi 15', 54', 70'; Bambang 76'	Stadium: Gelora Bung Karno Stadium; Attendance: 30,000; Referee: Mohd Nafeez Abdul Wahab (Malaysia)

9 December 2008 AFF Cup Group A	Indonesia	0–2	Singapore	Jakarta, Indonesia
19:30 UTC+7			Baihakki 3'; Shi Jiayi 50'	Stadium: Gelora Bung Karno Stadium; Attendance: 50,000; Referee: Ramachandran Krishnan (Malaysia)

16 December 2008 AFF Cup Semi-finals 1st Leg	Indonesia	0–1	Thailand	Jakarta, Indonesia
19:00 UTC+7		Report	Teerasil 6'	Stadium: Gelora Bung Karno Stadium; Attendance: 70,000; Referee: Võ Minh Trí (Vietnam)

20 December 2008 AFF Cup Semi-finals 2nd Leg	Thailand	2–1	Indonesia	Bangkok, Thailand
19:00 UTC+7	Teeratep 73'; Ronnachai 89'	Report	Nova 9'	Stadium: Rajamangala Stadium; Attendance: 40,000; Referee: Mohamed Hadimin (Brunei)

=== 2009 ===
19 January 2011 AFC Asian Cup qualification	Oman	0–0	Indonesia	Muscat, Oman
19:30 UTC+4		Report		Stadium: Sultan Qaboos Sports Complex; Attendance: 13,000; Referee: Tayeb Hasan Shamsuzzaman (Bangladesh)

28 January 2011 AFC Asian Cup qualification	Indonesia	0–0	Australia	Jakarta, Indonesia
19:30 UTC+7		Report		Stadium: Gelora Bung Karno Stadium; Attendance: 50,000; Referee: Malik Abdul Bashir (Singapore)

4 November Friendly	Singapore	3–1	Indonesia	Kallang, Singapore
19:30 UTC+8	Đurić 10', 58'; Alam Shah 21'	Report	Eka 13'	Stadium: National Stadium

14 November 2011 AFC Asian Cup qualification	Kuwait	2–1	Indonesia	Kuwait City, Kuwait
18:30 UTC+3	Al-Mutawa 61' (pen.), 87'	Report	Bambang 33'	Stadium: Al Kuwait Sports Club Stadium; Attendance: 16,000; Referee: Valentin Kovalenko (Uzbekistan)

18 November 2011 AFC Asian Cup qualification	Indonesia	1–1	Kuwait	Jakarta, Indonesia
18:30 UTC+7	Budi 45+4'	Report	Ajab 72'	Stadium: Gelora Bung Karno Stadium; Attendance: 36,000; Referee: Minoru Toju (Japan)
