= Ismed Sofyan =

Indonesian footballer

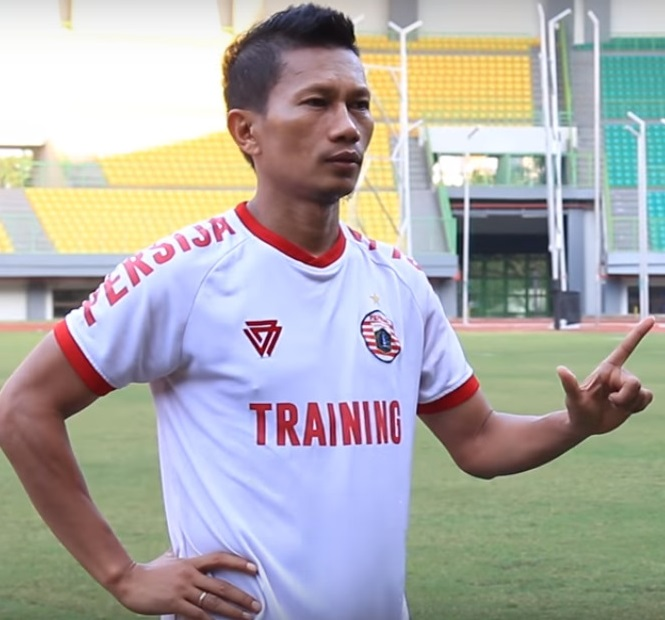
- Ismed with Persija Jakarta in 2017

Personal information
- Full name: Ismed Sofyan
- Date of birth: 28 August 1979 (age 47)
- Place of birth: Aceh Tamiang, Indonesia
- Height: 1.68 m (5 ft 6 in)
- Position: Right-back

Youth career
- 1996–1997: Diklat Ragunan

Senior career*
Years	Team	Apps	(Gls)
1997–1998	PSBL Langsa	8	(0)
1998−2000	Persiraja Banda Aceh	26	(0)
2000–2002	Sriwijaya	42	(4)
2002–2022	Persija Jakarta	370	(18)
2023–2024	Bekasi City	6	(0)
Total		452	(22)

International career
1996–1997	Indonesia U18		
1996	Indonesia U19		
1999–2001	Indonesia U23		
2000–2010	Indonesia	53	(3)

Managerial career
- 2019: Persija Jakarta (interim assistant)
- 2025: Nusantara Lampung (technical director)
- 2026–: Nusantara Lampung (head coach)
Medal record
Men's football
Representing Indonesia
AFF Championship
Runner-up	2000 Thailand	Team
Runner-up	2004 Vietnam & Malaysia	Team
- * Club domestic league appearances and goals

Ismed Sofyan (born 28 August 1979) is an Indonesian former footballer who played as a right-back or a wing-back. His speciality are free kick taking and assisting with high-curved pass. He has made 53 appearances for the Indonesia national football team.

== Club career ==
His first club career is at PSBL Langsa before he moved to Persiraja Banda Aceh. In 2002, he moved to Persijatim Jakarta Timur (currently known as Sriwijaya) for two seasons. After that, he moved to Persija Jakarta. He has been playing for Persija Jakarta since 2002 and make him as the most long serving period player in the club until now.

== International career ==
He played for both Indonesia U-19 and U-23 teams from 1997 to 2001. His first appearance for senior team was in Asian Cup 2000 in Lebanon. He substituted for Budi Sudarsono at the second round in second game for Indonesia against Saudi Arabia in Group D Asian Cup 2007. He's been listed for one of the most highest caps in Indonesia national team as a right defender.

== Career statistics ==
=== International ===
List of international goals scored by Ismed Sofyan
No.	Date	Venue	Opponent	Score	Result	Competition
1	6 May 2001	Rasmee Dhandu Stadium, Malé, Maldives	Maldives	2–0	2–0	2002 FIFA World Cup qualification
2	8 September 2004	Sugathadasa Stadium, Colombo, Sri Lanka	Sri Lanka	2–0	2–2	2006 FIFA World Cup qualification
3	15 November 2008	Thuwunna Stadium, Yangon, Myanmar	Myanmar	1–0	1–2	2008 Myanmar Grand Royal Challenge Cup

== Honours ==
Persija Jakarta

- Liga 1: 2018
- Indonesia President's Cup: 2018

Indonesia

- Indonesian Independence Cup: 2000, 2008
- AFF Championship runner-up: 2000, 2004
