= Sahari Gultom =

Indonesian footballer (born 1977)

Sahari Gultom (born 2 January 1977) is an Indonesian former footballer who played as a goalkeeper.

== Early life ==
Gultom has been nicknamed "Ucok".

== Career ==
Gultom played for the Indonesia national football team.

== Personal life ==
After retiring from professional football, Gultom worked in the coffee shop industry.

== Honours ==
Indonesia

- AFF Championship runner-up: 2000
