= Suwandi Siswoyo =

Indonesian footballer and manager

Personal information
- Full name: Suwandi Hadi Siswoyo
- Date of birth: 10 March 1972 (age 54)
- Place of birth: Gresik Regency, East Java, Indonesia
- Height: 1.73 m (5 ft 8 in)
- Position: Defender

Youth career
- Persegres Gresik

Senior career*
Years	Team	Apps	(Gls)
1988–1993	Persegres Gresik		
1993–1999	Petrokimia Putra		
2000	Persija Jakarta		
2001	PSM Makassar		
2002	Petrokimia Putra	24	(0)
2003	Perseden Denpasar		
2004	Persib Bandung		
2005	PKT Bontang		
2006	Persita Tangerang		
2007	Mitra Kukar		
Total		24+	(0+)

International career
1996–2000	Indonesia	13	(0)

Managerial career
- 2008: Perssu Sumenep
- 2008–2009: PSIR Rembang (assistant coach)
- 2009–2011: Bhayangkara F.C.
- * Club domestic league appearances and goals

Suwandi Hadi Siswoyo (born 10 March 1972 in Gresik Regency) is an Indonesian football player and manager who previously plays as defender for Persegres Gresik, Petrokimia Putra, Persija Jakarta, PSM Makassar, Perseden Denpasar, Persib Bandung, PKT Bontang, Persita Tangerang, Mitra Kukar FC and the Indonesia national team.

== Club statistics ==
Club	Season	Super League		Premier Division		Piala Indonesia		Total	
Club	Season	Apps	Goals	Apps	Goals	Apps	Goals	Apps	Goals
Petrokimia Putra	2002	-		24	0	-		24	0
Total		-		24	0	-		24	0

== Hounors ==
Petrokimia Putra

- Liga Indonesia Premier Division runner-up: 1994–95

PSM Makassar

- Liga Indonesia Premier Division runner-up: 2001

Petrokimia Putra

- Liga Indonesia Premier Division: 2002

Indonesia

- AFF Championship runner-up: 2000
