= Troy Fegidero =

Filipino footballer

Personal information
- Date of birth: 27 October 1975 (age 51)

Senior career*
Years	Team	Apps	(Gls)
c. 2009	Trimaxi-Agro FC		

International career
1998–2000	Philippines	10	(1)
- * Club domestic league appearances and goals

Troy Fegidero is a Filipino footballer.

Fegidero was part of the Philippines national football team that participated at the 2000 AFF Championship.

In 2009, Fegidero was playing for Trimaxi-Agro FC of the North Football League. In a 2–0 upset against defending champions Ceres F.C., he was one of the two scorers.

He is the cousin of Norman, Dave, and Joshua Fegidero, all three of which were also part of the Philippine 2000 AFF Championship squad.

International goals
Scores and results list the Philippines' goal tally first.

#	Date	Venue	Opponent	Score	Result	Competition
1.	29 January 2000	Thống Nhất Stadium, Ho Chi Minh City	Guam	2–0	2–0	2000 AFC Asian Cup qualification
