= Ahmad Shaharuddin Rosdi =

Malaysian footballer

Personal information
- Full name: Ahmad Shaharuddin Bin Ahmad Rosdi
- Date of birth: 22 May 1975 (age 51)
- Place of birth: Kuantan, Pahang, Malaysia
- Position: Midfielder

Senior career*
Years	Team	Apps	(Gls)
1995–2003	Pahang FA		
2005–2006	PKNS FC		

International career
1998–2002	Malaysia	16	(2)

Managerial career
- 2010–2015: Pahang FA (assistant coach)
- 2016: Pahang FA
- 2016–: Pahang FA (assistant coach)
- * Club domestic league appearances and goals

Ahmad Shaharuddin Rosdi (born 22 May 1975) is a former Malaysian footballer who was a midfielder for Pahang and the Malaysia national football team.

== Career ==
Ahmad Shaharuddin started his football career with Pahang in 1995. After he had bad knee injury on 2004, he were inactive from football for a year, before he decided to join PKNS FC for 2005/2006 season.

He also was the member of Malaysia football team from 1998 until 2003.

== Coaching career ==
After retired from playing football, Ahmad Shaharuddin Rosdi turned into coaching, and appointed the assistant coach of Pahang in 2010. And on 15 Dec 2015, he was appointed as Pahang FA head coach replacing former head coach, Zainal Abidin Hassan. After several inconsistent performances in the league and cup competition, Shaharuddin was reverted to his original assistant head coach position in March 2016, days after Pahang announced Razip Ismail to be their new head coach for the rest of the season.

== Achievements ==
=== International ===
- Second Runners-up Tiger Cup 2000

=== Club ===
With Pahang FA

- Runners-up 1995, 1997 Malaysia Cup
- Champion 1995 M-League
