= Abdinur Mohamud =

Somali footballer (born 1997)

Personal information
- Full name: Abdinur Mohamed Mohamud
- Date of birth: 13 September 1997 (age 29)
- Position: Midfielder

Team information
- Current team: Horseed

Senior career*
| Years | Team | Apps | (Gls) |
| 2013–2015 | Miembeni | | |
| 2015 | Ferroviário | | |
| 2015 | Nampula | | |
| 2016–2018 | Elman | | |
| 2018– | Horseed | | |

International career^{‡}
| 2011–2019 | Somalia | 10 | (0) |
- * Club domestic league appearances and goals ‡ National team caps and goals as of 5 September 2019

Abdinur Mohamed Mohamud (born 13 September 1997) is a Somali footballer who plays as a midfielder for Somali First Division club Horseed FC.

== International career ==
Mohamud made his international debut with Somalia in November 2011 at the age of 14, however it is unclear whether he made his debut on November 1 against Djibouti, or on November 12 against Ethiopia. Regardless of whichever game he first appeared in, Mohamud is still regarded as the youngest male footballer to appear in a FIFA recognised international fixture, beating Aung Kyaw Tun of Myanmar's 10 year record by between 13 and 25 days.

=== International statistics ===
| National team | Year | Apps | Goals |
|---|---|---|---|
| Somalia | 2011 | 3 | 0 |
| Somalia | 2012 | 1 | 0 |
| Somalia | 2013 | 1 | 0 |
| Somalia | 2014 | 3 | 0 |
| Somalia | 2015 | 0 | 0 |
| Somalia | 2016 | 0 | 0 |
| Somalia | 2017 | 0 | 0 |
| Somalia | 2018 | 0 | 0 |
| Somalia | 2019 | 2 | 0 |
| Total | | 10 | 0 |
