= Eko Purdjianto =

Indonesian footballer and manager

Personal information
- Full name: Eko Purdjianto
- Date of birth: 1 February 1976 (age 50)
- Place of birth: Semarang, Indonesia
- Height: 1.82 m (5 ft 11 1/2 in)
- Position: Defender

Team information
- Current team: PSMS Medan (Head Coach)

Senior career*
Years	Team	Apps	(Gls)
1999–2001	Pelita Solo	20	(3)
2002	PSPS Pekanbaru	26	(1)
2003–2005	PSIS Semarang	32	(1)
2006	Persema Malang	0	(0)
Total		78	(5)

International career
1999–2001	Indonesia	27	(3)

Managerial career
- 2010–2013: PSIS Semarang (Assistant coach)
- 2013–2015: Indonesia U19 (Assistant coach)
- 2016–2021: Bali United (Assistant coach)
- 2021–2022: Persis Solo
- 2022–2023: Persis Solo (Assistant coach)
- 2023: Indonesia U23 (Assistant coach)
- 2023: PSIS Semarang (Assistant coach)
- 2024–2025: Indonesia U20 (Assistant coach)
- 2026–: PSMS Medan
- * Club domestic league appearances and goals

Eko Purdjianto (born 1 February 1976) is an Indonesian former professional footballer who played as a defender. Besides Indonesia, he has played in Italy. Currently, he works as the head coach of PSMS Medan.

== International career ==
In 1999 Eko's international career began. He finished his international career on 27 May 2001 against China in the 2002 FIFA World Cup qualification.

=== International goals ===
Eko Purdjianto: International goals
No.	Date	Venue	Opponent	Score	Result	Competition
1	20 November 1999	Gelora Bung Karno Stadium, Jakarta, Indonesia	Cambodia	2–1	9–2	2000 AFC Asian Cup qualification
2	6 November 2000	700th Anniversary Stadium, Chiang Mai, Thailand	Philippines	3–0	3–0	2000 Tiger Cup
3	29 April 2001	Lambert Stadium, Phnom Penh, Cambodia	Cambodia	1–0	2–0	2002 FIFA World Cup qualification

== Honours ==
=== Player ===
Indonesia

- AFF Championship runner-up: 2000
- SEA Games bronze medal: 1999

=== Manager ===
Persis Solo

- Liga 2: 2021
