= Aung Kyaw Tun =

Burmese footballer (born 1986)

Personal information
- Date of birth: 5 August 1986 (age 40)
- Place of birth: Burma
- Height: 1.68 m (5 ft 6 in)
- Position: Midfielder

Senior career*
Years	Team	Apps	(Gls)
2002–2009	Ministry of Forestry	98	(0)
Total		98	(0)

International career^{‡}
2000–2003	Myanmar	13	(1)

Managerial career
- 2016–: Myanmar U19/U20 (assistant)
- 2018: Shan United (interim)
- 2018–: Shan United (assistant)
- * Club domestic league appearances and goals as of 13:04, 1 May 2018 (UTC) ‡ National team caps and goals as of 1 May 2018

Aung Kyaw Tun (Burmese: အောင်ကျော်ထွန်း) is a Burmese former professional footballer who played as a midfielder.

== International career ==
Tun became the youngest ever player to feature in a FIFA recognised match, when, at 14 years and 93 days, he made his debut for Myanmar against Thailand in the 2000 Tiger Cup, a record he held for over 10 years before it was broken in November 2011 by Somali player Abdinur Mohamud. He also scored in the match against Thailand, making him the youngest ever international male goalscorer - a record which still stands. Since then, he has accumulated 13 international caps.

== Coaching career ==
Tun now works as the assistant manager for the Myanmar national under-20 football team.

== Career statistics ==
=== International ===
As of matches played 2003.

National team	Year	Apps	Goals
Myanmar	2000	3	1
Myanmar	2001	4	0
Myanmar	2002	0	0
Myanmar	2003	6	0
Total		13	1

=== International goals ===
Scores and results list Myanmar's goal tally first.

No	Date	Venue	Opponent	Score	Result	Competition
1.	6 November 2000	700th Anniversary Stadium, Chiang Mai, Thailand	Thailand	1–2	1–3	2000 AFF Championship
