= AFF–EAFF Champions Trophy =

- Organiser(s): AFF and EAFF
- Founded: 2018; 8 years ago
- Region: Asia
- Teams: 2

The AFF–EAFF Champions Trophy is a planned biennial football match organized by the ASEAN Football Federation (AFF) and the East Asian Football Federation (EAFF). It is contested by the reigning champions of the respective Asian international football competitions, the ASEAN Championship and the EAFF E-1 Football Championship. It takes place during the FIFA international match window.

== History ==
The first AFF–EAFF Champions Trophy match, to be played on a single-match format, was initially scheduled to be held on 26 March 2019 at the Mỹ Đình National Stadium in Hanoi, Vietnam between the national football teams of Vietnam and South Korea. However, on 19 February 2019, it was announced that the inaugural AFF–EAFF Champions Trophy match would be postponed until an unclear date in 2020 after both contesting teams failed to settle on a date for the match within the 2019 calendar.

The trophy will be contested biennially, with AFF and EAFF rotating the host venue duties and the former staging the first-ever Champions Trophy. Vietnam automatically won hosting right to the inaugural Champions Trophy match on 15 December 2018 after beating Malaysia 3–2 on aggregate score in the 2018 AFF Championship Final. A memorandum of understanding (MoU) for the organisation of the AFF–EAFF Champions Trophy was signed in Hanoi, Vietnam on 15 December 2018 by AFF Deputy President, Major General Khiev Sameth, and EAFF President, Chung Mong-gyu.

== Qualified teams ==
Year	Qualifying teams	
Year	ASEAN Championship winners	EAFF E-1 Football Championship winners
2020	Vietnam (2018)	South Korea (2017)

== Results ==
Year	Host nation	Venue	Final			Attendance
Year	Host nation	Venue	Winner	Score	Runner-up	Attendance
2020	Vietnam	Mỹ Đình National Stadium, Hanoi	Cancelled due to COVID-19 pandemic (Note: Originally to be contested between Vietnam and South Korea)			
