= Uston Nawawi =

Indonesian footballer

Personal information
- Full name: Uston Nawawi
- Date of birth: 6 September 1978 (age 48)
- Place of birth: Sidoarjo, Indonesia
- Height: 1.70 m (5 ft 7 in)
- Position: Attacking midfielder

Team information
- Current team: Persebaya (Assistant coach)

Youth career
- 1995–1996: PSSI Baretti

Senior career*
Years	Team	Apps	(Gls)
1995–2003	Persebaya Surabaya	88	(22)
2003–2004	PSPS Pekanbaru	17	(3)
2004–2008	Persebaya Surabaya	70	(18)
2008–2009	Persisam Putra Samarinda	20	(1)
2009–2010	Persidafon Dafonsoro	15	(0)
2010–2011	Deltras Sidoarjo	21	(2)
2011–2012	Gresik United	22	(3)
2013	Bhayangkara Presisi Indonesia	22	(4)
Total		275	(53)

International career
1997–2004	Indonesia	47	(13)

Managerial career
- 2016: PSIR Rembang
- 2018–2019: Persebaya Surabaya U20
- 2020–: Persebaya Surabaya (Assistant coach)
- * Club domestic league appearances and goals

Uston Nawawi (born 6 September 1978 in Sidoarjo, East Java, Indonesia) is an Indonesian former footballer who last played as an attacking midfielder for Deltras Sidoarjo. He is former player of the Indonesia national team. His cousin, Rendy Irawan, is also a football player.

== Career statistics ==
=== International ===
Appearances and goals by national team and year
National team	Year	Apps	Goals
Indonesia	1997	4	1
Indonesia	1998	5	1
Indonesia	1999	10	2
Indonesia	2000	8	2
Indonesia	2001	5	4
Indonesia	2002	1	0
Indonesia	2003	4	2
Indonesia	2004	2	0
Total		39	12

Scores and results list Indonesia's goal tally first, score column indicates score after each Nawawi goal.

List of international goals scored by Uston Nawawi
No.	Date	Venue	Opponent	Score	Result	Competition
1	12 October 1997	Gelora Bung Karno Stadium, Jakarta, Indonesia	Philippines	1–0	2–0	1997 Southeast Asian Games
2	27 August 1998	Thống Nhất Stadium, Ho Chi Minh City, Vietnam	Philippines	3–0	3–0	1998 AFF Championship
3	9 August 1999	Berakas Sports Complex, Bandar Seri Begawan, Brunei	Brunei	1–0	3–0	1999 Southeast Asian Games
4	20 November 1999	Gelora Bung Karno Stadium, Jakarta, Indonesia	Cambodia	5–1	9–2	2000 AFC Asian Cup qualification
5	12 November 2000	700th Anniversary Stadium, Chiang Mai, Thailand	Myanmar	3–0	5–0	2000 AFF Championship
6	18 November 2000	700th Anniversary Stadium, Chiang Mai, Thailand	Thailand	1–2	1–4	2000 AFF Championship
7	8 April 2001	Gelora Bung Karno Stadium, Jakarta, Indonesia	Maldives	4–0	5–0	2002 FIFA World Cup qualification
8	22 April 2001	Gelora Bung Karno Stadium, Jakarta, Indonesia	Cambodia	2–0	6–0	2002 FIFA World Cup qualification
9	22 April 2001	Gelora Bung Karno Stadium, Jakarta, Indonesia	Cambodia	3–0	6–0	2002 FIFA World Cup qualification
10	22 April 2001	Gelora Bung Karno Stadium, Jakarta, Indonesia	Cambodia	4–0	6–0	2002 FIFA World Cup qualification
11	8 October 2003	Prince Abdullah Al Faisal Stadium, Jeddah, Saudi Arabia	Yemen	1–0	3–0	2004 AFC Asian Cup qualification
12	8 October 2003	Prince Abdullah Al Faisal Stadium, Jeddah, Saudi Arabia	Yemen	3–0	3–0	2004 AFC Asian Cup qualification

== Managerial statistics ==
As of 3 January 2026

Managerial record by team and tenure
Team	Nat.	From	To	Record					Ref.
Team	Nat.	From	To	G	W	D	L	Win %	Ref.
Persebaya Surabaya (caretaker)	(Indonesia)	5 August 2023	13 September 2023	5	4	1	0	80.00	
Persebaya Surabaya (caretaker)	(Indonesia)	28 October 2023	31 December 2023	5	0	4	1	0.00	
Persebaya Surabaya (caretaker)	(Indonesia)	23 November 2025	3 January 2026	5	2	3	0	40.00	
Career Total				15	6	8	1	40.00	

== Honours ==
Persebaya Surabaya

- Liga Indonesia Premier Division: 1996–97, 2004; runner up: 1998–99
- Liga Indonesia First Division: 2006

Persisam Putra Samarinda

- Liga Indonesia Premier Division: 2008–09

Persebaya DU (Bhayangkara)

- Liga Indonesia Premier Division: 2013

Indonesia

- Indonesian Independence Cup: 2000
- AFF Championship runner-up: 2000; third place: 1998
- SEA Games silver medal: 1997; bronze medal: 1999
