= Anon Boonsukco =

Thai footballer (born 1978)

Personal information
- Full name: Anon Boonsukco
- Date of birth: 1 April 1978 (age 48)
- Place of birth: Ratchaburi, Thailand
- Height: 1.74 m (5 ft 8 1/2 in)
- Position: Midfielder

Senior career*
Years	Team	Apps	(Gls)
1997–2010	Bangkok Glass	203	(23)
2010	Bangkok United		
2011–2012	Air Force Central		
2013	Nakhon Ratchasima		
2014	Sisaket	15	(0)

International career
2000–2008	Thailand	4	(0)
- * Club domestic league appearances and goals as of 14 November 2008

Anon Boonsukco (Thai: อนนท์ บุญสุโข, born April 1, 1978) is a Thai former professional footballer who played as a midfielder.
