= Rusdi Suparman =

Malaysian footballer

Personal information
- Full name: Mohd Rusdi Bin Mohd Suparman
- Date of birth: 27 January 1973 (age 53)
- Place of birth: Selayang, Selangor, Malaysia
- Position: Forward

Team information
- Current team: Immigration F.C. (assistant)

Senior career*
Years	Team	Apps	(Gls)
1993–2003	Selangor FA		
2003–2004	PKNS F.C.		
2004–2006	Melaka Telekom		
2006	MPSJ FC		

International career
1996–2001	Malaysia	35	(18)

Managerial career
- 2007–2008: Selangor FA U-17
- 2009–2010: Selangor FA U-19
- 2011–2012: PKNS F.C. U-21
- 2013: Selangor FA U-21
- 2014: PKNS F.C. U-21
- 2014: Harimau Muda A (assistant)
- 2015: Malaysia U-23 (assistant)
- 2016–2017: Kuala Lumpur FA (assistant)
- 2018: Kuantan FA (assistant)
- 2018: Selangor FA (assistant)
- * Club domestic league appearances and goals

Mohd Rusdi Bin Mohd Suparman (born 27 January 1973) is a retired Malaysian footballer. He is also known as Superman. He is a former member of the Malaysian pre-Olympic team and the Malaysian national team.

== Career ==
During 1993–1998, he partnered with Azman Adnan in front for Selangor FA. When Azman left to Penang FA, Rusdi was partnered with Rudie Ramli and Mohd Nizaruddin Yusof. He once won the Premier League Malaysia golden boots award with 15 goals. He won the M-League title, the Malaysian FA Cup and the Malaysia Cup.

Rusdi participated at the 2000 Tiger Cup. He helped Malaysia to win the 3rd place after beating Vietnam 3–0, by scoring 2 goals. Rusdi scored 4 goals in the tournament. Rusdi have 35 caps and 18 goals for Malaysia.

== Honours ==
Selangor FA

- Liga Perdana 1: 2000
- Liga Semi-Pro Divisyen 2: 1993
- Malaysia Cup: 1995, 1996, 1997, 2002
- Malaysian FA Cup: 1997, 2001
- Malaysian Charity Shield: 1996, 1997, 2002
