= Gendut Doni =

Indonesian professional footballer

Personal information
- Full name: Gendut Doni Christiawan
- Date of birth: 6 December 1978 (age 47)
- Place of birth: Salatiga, Indonesia
- Height: 1.78 m (5 ft 10 in)
- Position: Striker

Team information
- Current team: Indonesia U-20 (Assistant coach)

Senior career*
Years	Team	Apps	(Gls)
1998–1999	PSIS Semarang	12	(6)
1999–2000	Persijatim Jakarta	22	(10)
2000–2002	Persija Jakarta	44	(26)
2002–2004	Persikota Tangerang	40	(20)
2004–2005	Persebaya Surabaya	24	(14)
2005–2006	Arema Malang	24	(4)
2006–2007	Persib Bandung	18	(4)
2007–2008	Persitara North Jakarta	30	(8)
2008–2009	Pelita Jaya Bandung	24	(12)
2009–2010	Persiba Balikpapan	24	(6)
2010–2011	Persijap Jepara	20	(4)
2011–2012	Persikota Tangerang	22	(8)
Total		304	(122)

International career
1996	Indonesia U20	4	(2)
2000–2004	Indonesia	20	(10)

Managerial career
- 2022–2024: Bhayangkara (Assistant coach)
- 2025–: Indonesia U-20 (Assistant coach)
- * Club domestic league appearances and goals

Gendut Doni Christiawan (born 7 December 1978) is an Indonesian former professional footballer. He played as a striker for the club Persikota Tangerang until he was cut from their squad in September 2011. His brother, Nugroho Adiyanto, is a former PSIS Semarang defender.

== Club career ==
He started his career in the 1998-99 season with his hometown team, PSIS Semarang, although he never played in the first-team. He moved to Persijatim Sriwijaya and was on the roster for two seasons but never played.

In 2002, he moved to the capital, Jakarta, to play with Persija Jakarta, where he recorded 23 appearances and scored one goal. This attracted the attention of other clubs, including Persikota Tangerang. He moved to Tangerang and remained there for two seasons, playing in 40 games and scoring 20 goals. His future looked bright, as one of the main strikers for the Indonesia national football team. He moved in 2004 to Persebaya Surabaya, but failed to impress—8 appearances and two goals—so he was sold to Arema Malang at the end of the season.

With Arema, Doni played sporadically: eleven caps and four goals. He remained with Persib Bandung in 2006, then, the same year, moved to lower-division Persitara Jakarta Utara, where, as the main striker, he played regularly and scored four goals.

== International career ==
He earned 22 caps for the Indonesia national team, scoring nine goals, and appeared as the top-scorer in the 2000 Tiger Cup, with five goals, together with Worrawoot Srimaka.

== Career statistics ==
=== International ===
Appearances and goals by national team and year
National team	Year	Apps	Goals
Indonesia	2000	7	8
Indonesia	2001	3	0
Indonesia	2002	5	1
Indonesia	2003	4	0
Indonesia	2004	1	0
Total		20	9

Indonesia score listed first, score column indicates score after each Doni goal.

List of international goals scored by Gendut Doni Christiawan
No.	Date	Venue	Opponent	Score	Result	Competition
1	28 August 2000	Gelora Senayan Stadium, Jakarta, Indonesia	Myanmar	1–0	4–1	2000 Independence Cup
2	28 August 2000	Gelora Senayan Stadium, Jakarta, Indonesia	Myanmar	3–0	4–1	2000 Independence Cup
3	3 September 2000	Gelora Senayan Stadium, Jakarta, Indonesia	Iraq	3–0	3–0	2000 Independence Cup
4	10 November 2000	700th Anniversary Stadium, Chiang Mai, Thailand	Thailand	1–3	1–4	2000 AFF Championship
5	12 November 2000	700th Anniversary Stadium, Chiang Mai, Thailand	Myanmar	1–0	5–0	2000 AFF Championship
6	12 November 2000	700th Anniversary Stadium, Chiang Mai, Thailand	Myanmar	2–0	5–0	2000 AFF Championship
7	16 November 2000	Rajamangala Stadium, Bangkok, Thailand	Vietnam	1–0	3–2 (a.e.t.)	2000 AFF Championship
8	16 November 2000	Rajamangala Stadium, Bangkok, Thailand	Vietnam	3–2	3–2 (a.e.t.)	2000 AFF Championship
9	29 December 2002	Gelora Bung Karno Stadium, Jakarta, Indonesia	Thailand	2–2	2–2 (a.e.t.) (2–4 p)	2002 AFF Championship

== Honours ==
Persija Jakarta

- Liga Indonesia Premier Division: 2001

Persebaya Surabaya

- Liga Indonesia Premier Division: 2004

Indonesia U18

- Asian Schools Championship: 1996

Indonesia

- AFF Championship runner-up: 2000, 2002

Individual

- Asian Schools Championship Best player:1996
- AFF Championship Top scorer: 2000
