= Shahrul Azhar =

Malaysian footballer

Personal information
- Full name: Ahmad Shahrul Azhar Sofian
- Date of birth: 24 October 1974 (age 52)
- Place of birth: Perak, Malaysia
- Position: Midfielder

Team information
- Current team: Perak President's Cup Manager

Senior career*
Years	Team	Apps	(Gls)
1996–1997	Perak		(3)
1998–1999	Negeri Sembilan		(3)
2000–2008	Perak		(21)
2009	Proton		

International career
2002	Malaysia U-23	3	(0)
1999–2001	Malaysia	6	(1)
1999–2002	Malaysia	40	(7)
- * Club domestic league appearances and goals

Ahmad Shahrul Azhar Sofian (born 24 October 1974) is a Malaysian former footballer best known for his time with Perak, where he was team captain and wore the number 7 jersey. He was a central midfielder.

== Career ==
Shahrul spent almost his entire career with Perak FA. He made his debut in 1996 and remained with Perak FA until 2008 except in 1998 and 1999, where he joined Negeri Sembilan FA. He is a highly-influential player for Perak FA, but is perhaps more known for his fiery temperament than his footballing abilities. He was once banned 12 months for his antics against the fourth official after receiving a red card against Selangor MPPJ.

Shahrul made his international senior debut at the 1999 Dunhill Cup in Vietnam. He also played in the 1999 Southeast Asian Games where he scored a hat-trick against Cambodia. In 2000, Ahmad Shahrul was selected as the captain of the national team. On 25 May 2002, he was called up for an international friendly match against five times World Cup winners Brazil. He was selected as one of the first eleven to play against Brazilian stars such as Ronaldo and Barca's Ronaldinho. His last appearance with the national team is at the 2002 Asian Games in Busan, South Korea.

He was also sent off in the 2007 Malaysia Cup final for a second-bookable offence. Perak went on to lose that match 3-0.

He played for Proton FC in the 2009 Malaysia Premier League, and retired at the end of the season.

Previously Shahrul works as Assistant Coach of U20 Negeri Sembilan FA.

Currently he works as Manager of Perak FA.

== International goals ==
=== Goals for Senior National Team ===
#	Date	Venue	Opponent	Score	Result	Competition
1.	4 August 1999	Bandar Seri Begawan, Brunei	Cambodia	7-3	Won	1999 Southeast Asian Games
2.	4 August 1999	Bandar Seri Begawan, Brunei	Cambodia	7-3	Won	1999 Southeast Asian Games
3.	4 August 1999	Bandar Seri Begawan, Brunei	Cambodia	7-3	Won	1999 Southeast Asian Games
4.	7 November 2000	Songkhla, Thailand	Laos	5-0	Won	2000 Tiger Cup
5.	7 November 2000	Songkhla, Thailand	Cambodia	3-2	Won	2000 Tiger Cup
6.	9 February 2001	Ba Town, Fiji	Fiji	2-1	Won	Friendly
7.	25 June 2001	Shah Alam, Malaysia	Bosnia and Herzegovina	2-2	Draw	2001 Pestabola Merdeka

== Personal life ==
His grandfather, Ahmad Nazari was also a football player and a part of the Malaya national football team when it finished third in the 1962 Asian Games in Jakarta.

== Honours ==
=== Club ===
Perak

- Malaysia Premier League 1: 2002, 2003
- Malaysia Cup: 2000
- Malaysia FA Cup: 2004
- Sultan Haji Ahmad Shah Cup: 2005, 2006

=== International ===
Malaysia

- Pestabola Merdeka runner-up: 2000

== Awards ==
Shahrul was honoured by the Perak state in 2005 along with his teammates Chan Wing Hoong, K. Nanthakumar, Mohd Hamsani Ahmad and Syamsul Saad for their contributions to state football.
