= Seto Nurdiantoro =

Indonesian football player and coach (born 1974)

Personal information
- Full name: Matheus Seto Nurdiantara
- Date of birth: 14 April 1974 (age 52)
- Place of birth: Sleman, Indonesia
- Height: 1.69 m (5 ft 7 in)
- Position: Midfielder

Senior career*
Years	Team	Apps	(Gls)
1991–1995	PSS Sleman		
1995–1996	PSIM Yogyakarta		
1996–2000	Pelita Solo (Note: Pelita Jaya changed its name to Pelita Mastrans in 1997, Pelita Bakrie in 1998, and Pelita Solo in 1999.)		
2001–2005	PSS Sleman	96	(22)
2006–2007	PSIM Yogyakarta	33	(6)

International career
2000–2001	Indonesia	11	(1)

Managerial career
- 2013–2015: PSIM Yogyakarta
- 2015–2016: D.I. Yogyakarta (Pra-PON)
- 2016–2020: PSS Sleman
- 2020–2021: PSIM Yogyakarta
- 2022–2023: PSS Sleman
- 2024: PSIM Yogyakarta
- * Club domestic league appearances and goals

Matheus Seto Nurdiantara (born 14 April 1974) is an Indonesian football coach and former player. He represented Indonesia internationally as a midfielder at the 2000 AFC Asian Cup.

== Managerial career ==
Nurdiantaro began coaching at PSIM Yogyakarta in 2013, remaining at the club until 2015 when he became coach of the Special Region of Yogyakarta (D.I. Yogyarta) Pra PON team. Between 2016 and 2020, he was head coach of PSS Sleman, before returning to PSIM on 29 January 2020. On 31 December 2021, after having failed to gain promotion to the Liga 1, Nurdiantaro announced that he would take a break from football. He returned to coach PSS Sleman in April 2022.

== Career statistics ==
=== International ===
Scores and results list Indonesia's goal tally first, score column indicates score after each Riyadi goal.

List of international goals scored by Yaris Riyadi
No.	Date	Venue	Opponent	Score	Result	Competition	Ref.
1	16 November 2000	Rajamangala Stadium, Bangkok, Thailand	Vietnam	2–1	3–2	2000 AFF Championship	

== Honours ==
=== Player ===
PSS Sleman

- Liga Indonesia First Division: 2000

Persiba Bantul

- Liga Indonesia Premier Division: 2010–11

Indonesia

- AFF Championship runner-up: 2000

=== Manager ===
PSS Sleman

- Liga 2: 2018
