= Phạm Hùng Dũng =

Vietnamese footballer

Personal information
- Full name: Phạm Hùng Dũng
- Date of birth: 28 September 1978 (age 48)
- Place of birth: Đà Nẵng, Vietnam
- Height: 1.75 m (5 ft 9 in)
- Position: Defender

Youth career
- 1995–2001: Đà Nẵng

Senior career*
Years	Team	Apps	(Gls)
2002–2008	SHB Đà Nẵng	174	(3)
2009–2010	The Vissai Ninh Bình	12	(0)
Total		186	(3)

International career
1997–1999	Vietnam U23	7	(0)
2000–2007	Vietnam	23	(1)
- * Club domestic league appearances and goals

Phạm Hùng Dũng (born 28 September 1978 in Đà Nẵng, Vietnam) is a Vietnamese former football player. He was called up in the national team in 2002 and had participated in the AFC Asian Cup in 2007. He played for SHB Đà Nẵng and The Vissai Ninh Bình.

At 5:30 2 June 2011, he was stabbed at Glori Hotel (Nha Trang, Khánh Hòa). He was treated at Khánh Hòa province polyclinic hospital. At the afternoon in the same day, the police has started to investigate the incident.

== International goals ==
#	Date	Venue	Opponent	Score	Result	Competition
1.	13 November 2000	Tinsulanonda Stadium, Songkhla, Thailand	Laos	5–0	5–0	2000 AFF Championship
