= Dave Fegidero =

Filipino footballer (1978–2007)

Personal information
- Date of birth: May 15, 1978
- Place of birth: Philippines
- Date of death: October 2, 2007 (aged 29)
- Place of death: Hat Yai, Thailand
- Position: Defender

Youth career
- Western Visayas

International career
Years	Team	Apps	(Gls)
2000–2002	Philippines		
- Philippines U-23

Managerial career
- De-La Salle Zobel

Dave Fegidero (May 15, 1978 – October 2, 2007) was a Filipino footballer.

== Education ==
Dave Fegidero attended Bacolod City National High School and helped Western Visayas win several titles at the Palarong Pambansa. He studied at the University of Negros Occidental – Recoletos as an athletic scholar for his college studies and attained a business degree from the institution.

== Football career ==
He was part of the Philippine national team that participated at the 2000 Tiger Cup along with his brothers Norman and Joshua and cousin Troy Fegidero and at the 2002 FIFA World Cup qualifiers. He also coached the De-La Salle Zobel team for two years.

== Death ==
Dave Fegidero worked as an English teacher in Hat Yai, Thailand. He was involved in a motorcycle accident and died late at night on October 2, 2007. He was set to participate in the 2007 Southeast Asian Games with the national futsal team.
