= Tanongsak Prajakkata =

Thai footballer (born 1976)

Personal information
- Full name: Tanongsak Prajakkata
- Date of birth: 29 June 1976 (age 50)
- Place of birth: Nong Khai, Thailand
- Height: 1.74 m (5 ft 8 1/2 in)
- Position: Defender

Senior career*
Years	Team	Apps	(Gls)
2000–2006	BEC Tero Sasana	95	(1)
2007–2009	TTM Samut Sakhon	68	(2)
2009–2012	Bangkok Glass	29	(0)
2013–2014	Chainat Hornbill	8	(0)
2014	Bangkok	10	(0)
2015	Kasetsart University	16	(0)
Total		226	(3)

International career
1996–1997	Thailand U-17		
1997–2004	Thailand	58	(3)

Managerial career
- 2019–2021: Chiangmai (assistant)
- 2021: Rajpracha
- 2021–2022: Chiangmai (assistant)
- 2022: Chiangmai
- 2022–2024: Chiangmai (assistant)
- 2026: BG Pathum Youth
- 2026–: BG Pathum U21
- * Club domestic league appearances and goals

Tanongsak Prajakkata (Thai ทนงสักธิ์ ประจักกะตา) (born 29 June, 1976) is a Thai football manager and former professional football player, he is the currently head coach of Thai U21 League club BG Pathum U21. A defender, he scored 3 goals for the national team. He played for BEC Tero Sasana in the ASEAN Club Championship 2003, where the club finished as runners-up.

== International goals ==
#	Date	Venue	Opponent	Score	Result	Competition
1.	November 18, 2000	Bangkok, Thailand	Indonesia	4–1	4–1	2000 Tiger Cup

== Honours ==
Thailand

- ASEAN Football Championship: 2000, 2002
