= Azman Adnan =

Malaysian footballer

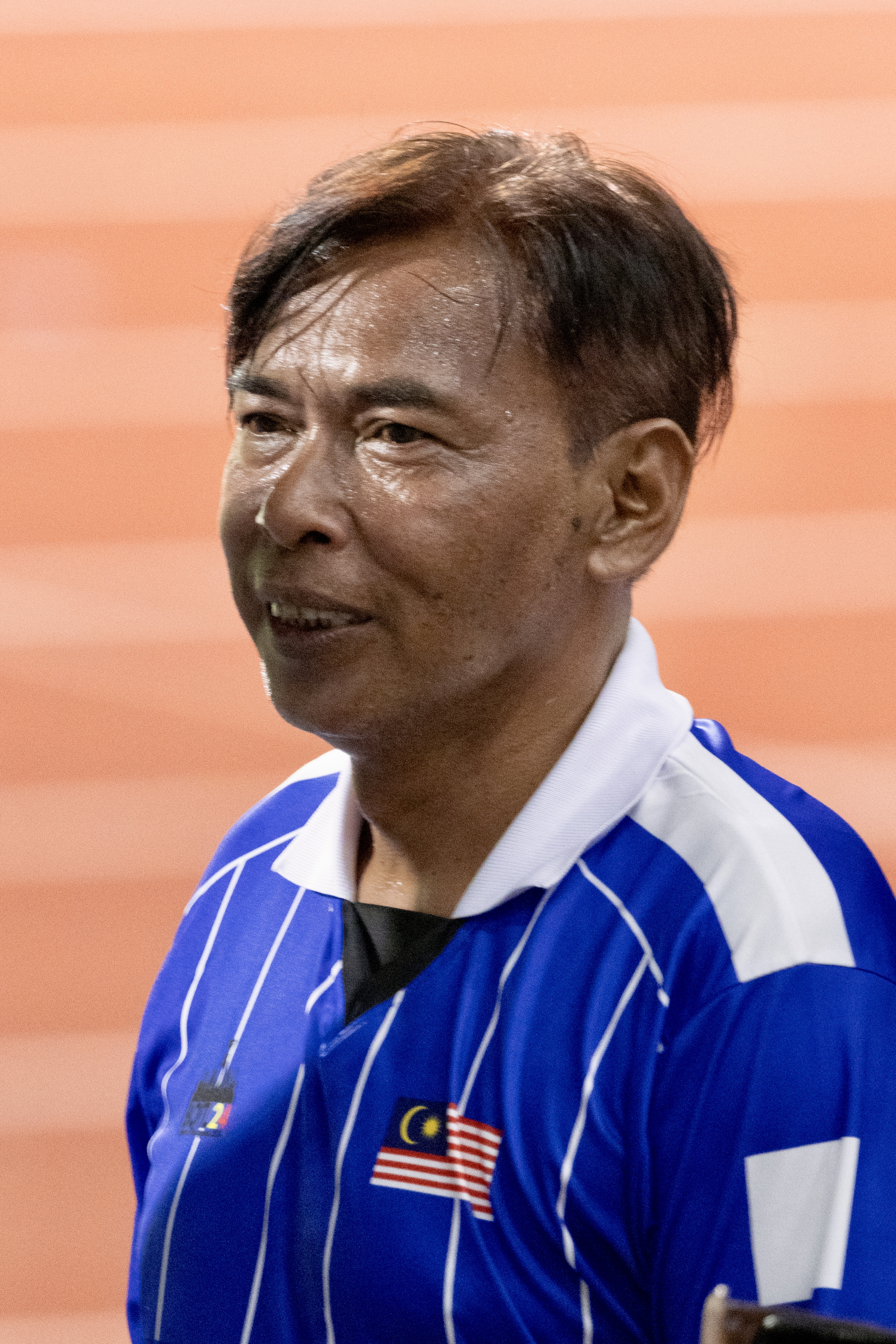
- Azman in 2024

Personal information
- Full name: Azman bin Adnan
- Date of birth: 1 November 1971 (age 55)
- Place of birth: Kem Terendak, Malacca, Malaysia
- Height: 1.75 m (5 ft 9 in)
- Position: Striker

Youth career
- 1987–1989: Kuala Lumpur FA

Senior career*
Years	Team	Apps	(Gls)
1989–1992	Kuala Lumpur FA		
1993–1998	Selangor FA		
1999	Penang FA		
2000–2001	Negeri Sembilan FA		
2002	Selangor FA		
2003	Negeri Sembilan FA		
2004	Selangor FA		

International career^{‡}
1991–2000	Malaysia	52	(17)
1996	Malaysia futsal		

Managerial career
- 2013–2014: PDRM FA (Assistant coach)
- 2014–2015: PDRM FA
- 2019: Tun Razak FC
- 2020–: Ultimate
Medal record
Men's football
Representing Malaysia
AFF Championship
Runner-up	1996
- * Club domestic league appearances and goals as of 7 February 2020 ‡ National team caps and goals as of 5 August 2014

Azman Adnan (born 1 November 1971) is a former Malaysian footballer.

== Career ==
He is also a former member of the Malaysian pre-Olympic team and also the Malaysian national team scoring 17 international goals in 52 appearances. He also played for Malaysia national futsal team, and was in the squad that took part in the 1996 FIFA Futsal World Championship in Spain. He previously won the Malaysia Premier League 1 Golden Boots as he scored 13 goals for Penang FA in 1999. He is a former head coach for PDRM FA.

He is an avid Selangor FA fan since he was a child. His father was a soldier from Kajang, Selangor and his mother is from Pedas, Negeri Sembilan. During 1993-1998, he partnered with Rusdi Suparman in front as they became the formidable striker duo for Selangor FA. He was a Selangor FA legend after he spent a long time playing with them. He won many trophies in Malaysian football such as the M-League title, the Malaysian FA Cup and the Malaysia Cup. He was described as the 'next Mokhtar Dahari' in Malaysian football.

He retired in 2004 with his last club Selangor FA. Now he works as coach at youth academy in Kuala Lumpur with DBKL. He was also one of eight couples that joined reality TV "Sehati Berdansa" (in Astro Ria channel) in 2007.

== Honours ==
=== Player ===
Kuala Lumpur

- Malaysia Cup: 1989

Selangor

- Liga Semi-Pro Divisyen 2: 1993
- Malaysia Cup: 1995, 1996, 1997, 2002
- Malaysian FA Cup: 1997
- Malaysian Charity Shield: 1996, 1997, 2002

Penang

- Premier League 1: 1999 runner up

Negeri Sembilan

- Malaysian FA Cup: 2003

=== International ===
- Indonesian Independence Cup: 1992
- Pestabola Merdeka: 1993
- AFF Championship: 1996 runner-up; 2000 third place

=== Individual ===
- Premier League 1 Golden Boot: 1999

=== Manager ===
PDRM

- Malaysia Premier League: 2014
- People's Cup: 2015

== Personal life ==
Azman has married twice. His first marriage was with singer Haleeda Mazlin, however, they divorce in early 2000. He then marries former singer and member of Malaysian girl group, Feminin, Asfarina Muhamad or As. In 2007 Azman and As join competition dance called Sehati Berdansa in Astro Ria.
