= Vũ Công Tuyền =

Vietnamese footballer

Personal information
- Full name: Vũ Công Tuyền
- Date of birth: 17 May 1969 (age 57)
- Place of birth: Thái Bình, North Vietnam
- Height: 1.66 m (5 ft 5 in)
- Position: Forward

Youth career
- 1979–1986: Công An Thái Bình

Senior career*
| Years | Team | Apps | (Gls) |
| 1987–1997 | Quan Khu 3 | 227 | (78) |
| 1997–2004 | Thể Công | 132 | (47) |

International career
| 2000 | Vietnam | 8 | (9) |
- * Club domestic league appearances and goals

Vũ Công Tuyền (born 17 May 1969) is a Vietnamese former international footballer who played as a forward. He was capped eight times in 2000, scoring nine goals.

== Career statistics ==
=== International ===
| National team | Year | Apps | Goals |
|---|---|---|---|
| Vietnam | 2000 | 8 | 9 |
| Total | | 8 | 9 |

=== International goals ===
Scores and results list Vietnam's goal tally first, score column indicates score after each Vietnam goal.

List of international goals scored by Vũ
| No. | Date | Venue | Opponent | Score | Result | Competition |
|---|---|---|---|---|---|---|
| 1 | 23 January 2000 | Thống Nhất Stadium, Ho Chi Minh City, Vietnam | Guam | 2–0 | 11–0 | 2000 AFC Asian Cup qualification |
| 2 | 23 January 2000 | Thống Nhất Stadium, Ho Chi Minh City, Vietnam | Guam | 3–0 | 11–0 | 2000 AFC Asian Cup qualification |
| 3 | 23 January 2000 | Thống Nhất Stadium, Ho Chi Minh City, Vietnam | Guam | 4–0 | 11–0 | 2000 AFC Asian Cup qualification |
| 4 | 23 January 2000 | Thống Nhất Stadium, Ho Chi Minh City, Vietnam | Guam | 6–0 | 11–0 | 2000 AFC Asian Cup qualification |
| 5 | 23 January 2000 | Thống Nhất Stadium, Ho Chi Minh City, Vietnam | Guam | 11–0 | 11–0 | 2000 AFC Asian Cup qualification |
| 6 | 26 January 2000 | Thống Nhất Stadium, Ho Chi Minh City, Vietnam | Philippines | 1–0 | 3–0 | 2000 AFC Asian Cup qualification |
| 7 | 7 November 2000 | Tinsulanon Stadium, Songkhla, Thailand | Cambodia | 4–0 | 6–0 | 2000 Tiger Cup |
| 8 | 7 November 2000 | Tinsulanon Stadium, Songkhla, Thailand | Cambodia | 6–0 | 6–0 | 2000 Tiger Cup |
| 9 | 13 November 2000 | Tinsulanon Stadium, Songkhla, Thailand | Laos | 2–0 | 5–0 | 2000 Tiger Cup |
