= Kiatisuk Senamuang =

Thai footballer and manager

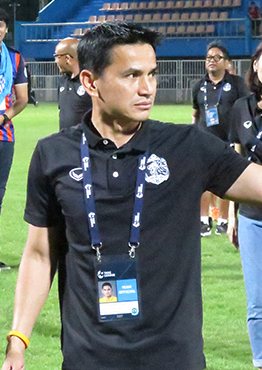
- Senamuang with Port in 2017

Personal information
- Full name: Kiatisuk Senamuang
- Date of birth: 11 August 1973 (age 53)
- Place of birth: Udon Thani, Thailand
- Height: 1.73 m (5 ft 8 in)
- Position: Striker

Youth career
- 1982–1990: Nampong Suksa School
- 1991–1992: Bangkok Commercial School
- 1993–1994: Dhurakij Pundit University

Senior career*
| Years | Team | Apps | (Gls) |
| 1991–1995 | Krung Thai Bank | 145 | (98) |
| 1995–1996 | Rajpracha | 27 | (18) |
| 1997–1998 | Royal Thai Police | 25 | (21) |
| 1998–1999 | Perlis | 21 | (22) |
| 1999–2000 | Huddersfield Town | 0 | (0) |
| 2000–2001 | Rajpracha | 26 | (18) |
| 2001–2002 | Singapore Armed Forces | 20 | (15) |
| 2002–2006 | Hoàng Anh Gia Lai | 75 | (59) |
| Total | | 339 | (251) |

International career
| 1990–1992 | Thailand U20 | 11 | (5) |
| 1993–2007 | Thailand | 134 | (71) |

Managerial career
- 2006: Hoàng Anh Gia Lai
- 2008: Chula United
- 2008–2009: Chonburi
- 2010: Hoàng Anh Gia Lai
- 2011–2012: Chula United
- 2012–2013: Bangkok
- 2013–2016: Thailand U23
- 2013: Thailand (caretaker)
- 2014–2017: Thailand
- 2017: Port
- 2020–2024: Hoàng Anh Gia Lai
- 2024: Công An Hà Nội
Medal record
Men's football
Representing Thailand (as player)
AFF Championship
| Winner | 1996 |
| Winner | 2000 |
| Winner | 2002 |
| Runner-up | 2007 |
Representing Thailand (as manager)
| Winner | 2014 |
| Winner | 2016 |
- * Club domestic league appearances and goals

Kiatisuk Senamuang (Thai: เกียรติศักดิ์ เสนาเมือง; born 11 August 1973) is a Thai football manager and former football player.

He is nicknamed "Thai Zico" by fans. During his eighteen-year career Kiatisuk played as a striker and scored 251 goals in 339 appearances. The former forward played for clubs in Malaysia, Singapore, England and Vietnam as well as in his homeland. Kiatisuk also earned 131 caps and scored 70 goals for Thailand between 1992 and 2007.

Between 2014 and 2017, Kiatisuk was head coach of the Thailand first-team (2013–2016) and the Thailand U-23 team. Previously, in 2013, he had also been the caretaker head coach of Thailand.

Kiatisuk has a Bachelor of Business Administration from Dhurakij Pundit University and Master of Business Administration from Chandrakasem Rajabhat University.

== Playing career ==
=== Club career ===
Kiatisuk Senamuang played with Perlis in Malaysia before joining an English club Huddersfield Town in 1999, which the then manager, Steve Bruce, considered merely a publicity stunt. After one season, in which he did not feature in the Huddersfield Town first team squad, Kiatisuk left English football for Rajpracha Sports Club in Thailand, later joining Singapore Armed Forces FC where he scored 15 goals in 20 games. In March 2002, he moved once again to become a star in Vietnam with Hoàng Anh Gia Lai, where he helped win the V.League 1 title several times. He returned to play for the Thailand national football team in the King's Cup.

=== International career ===
Kiatisuk played 131 international matches and scored 70 goals for the national team. Both figures are Thai national records.

== Managerial career ==
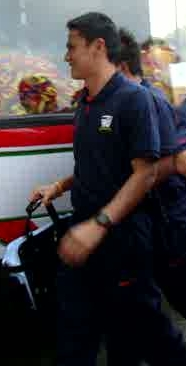
Senamuang with Thailand national football team in 2006

=== Vietnam ===
After retiring from playing in 2006, Kiatisuk went straight into management with V-League side Hoàng Anh Gia Lai.

=== Return to Thailand ===
In 2008, Kiatisuk returned to Thailand to take charge of Chula United. In 2009, Kiatisuk became the head coach of Chonburi and led the club to win the 2009 Kor Royal Cup. Kiatisuk managed to finish the season in second place, with the highest points ever achieved by the club. Nevertheless, after failing to secure the domestic league title he resigned.

=== Second spell in Vietnam ===
Kiatisuk went to Vietnam again to manage his former club Hoàng Anh Gia Lai. He finished his season in the V-League in seventh place. He led Hoàng Anh Gia Lai to the final of the 2010 Vietnamese Cup but lost 0–1 to Sông Lam Nghệ An at Thống Nhất Stadium, Ho Chi Minh City.

=== Back to Thailand again ===
In December 2010, Kiatisuk returned to Thailand as the head coach of Chula United in Division 1. He brought the club to third place by the end of the season resulting in promotion to the 2012 Thai Premier League. After ten games in the top league, Kiatisuk resigned from his position due to poor results: 1 win, 4 draws, and 5 losses.

A month later, Kiatisuk decided to join Bangkok in the 2012 Thai Division 1 League to help the club to avoid relegation. Bangkok survived in the second league of Thailand after finishing in tenth place (in the middle of the table).

=== The national manager ===
In January 2013, Kiatisuk was appointed to be the head coach of Thailand U-23. He won 1–0 in his debut match in the friendly against Ayutthaya of Division 1 on 12 January.

In June 2013, Kiatisuk was appointed as a caretaker head coach of Thailand senior team, replacing Winfried Schaefer. His debut match as head coach of the War Elephants was in a friendly against China on 15 June 2013, which the Thais won 5–1. He was also responsible as the head coach for the Thailand U-23 team preparing for the 2013 SEA Games.

As head coach of Thailand U-23, Kiatisuk guided the team to 2013 SEA Games gold, adding to the four golds he won as a player in four straight Games from 1993 to 1999. He also led Thailand U-23 to the semi-finals at 2014 Asian Games and finished in 4th place.

In 2014, due to his success in 2014 Asian Games, Kiatisuk was appointed to be a permanent head coach of Thailand to compete in the 2014 AFF Championship. Using mainly young players from his former U-23 side, he led Thailand to the victory with a 4–3 aggregate score against Malaysia in the final, becoming the only person to win the AFF Championship as both a player and a manager.

In 2015, for the second round of 2018 FIFA World Cup qualification, Thailand was drawn in the same group as Iraq, Vietnam and Chinese Taipei. With Kiattisuk as manager, the team finished as the winner of the group with 14 points from six games. Thailand advanced to the final round of qualification.

In 2016, Kiatisuk managed the Thai side to defend the title in the 2016 AFF Championship. Having won all the games en route to the final, on 14 December Thailand lost 1–2 at Pakansari Stadium against Indonesia in the first leg of the final. Nevertheless, Thailand managed to secure a return of the trophy with a 2–0 win at Rajamangala Stadium and lifted their fifth regional title on 17 December 2016. Kiattisuk became the third manager, after Peter Withe and Radojko Avramović, to successfully defend the AFF Championship title.

Kiatisuk continued to coach Thailand in the final round of World Cup qualification. However, he managed to collect only one point from seven games of the qualification. Three days after a 0–4 loss to Japan at Saitama Stadium 2002 on 28 March 2017, Kiatisuk stepped down from his position as the manager of the national team after four years in charge.

After his spell at the national team, Kiatisuk shortly managed Thai League 1 club Port in 2017, but resigned due to poor results.

=== Return to Hoàng Anh Gia Lai ===
On 20 November 2020, Kiatisuk was appointed head coach with a two-year contract of Hoàng Anh Gia Lai, his former Vietnamese club. His first match in charge was on 17 January 2021 away against Saigon. The game ended in a 1–0 defeat. On 22 January 2021, Kiatisuk won his first game in a 2–1 home win over Sông Lam Nghệ An.

At the time of the cancelation of 2021 V.League 1 due to COVID-19 pandemic, Kiatisuk's Hoàng Anh Gia Lai were the 1st place in the league table with 29 points from 12 games and qualified for the AFC Champions League, but the season was voided and the title was not awarded.

== Personal life ==
Kiatisuk is a Buddhist, like most Thais in Thailand, and was born in Udon Thani. Before he became a professional football player, he worked as a police officer, but always had a love for football. According to a friend, "his move to football was prompted by insecurity".

He was given the nickname Zico by his friends, in honour of his favourite Brazilian football idol Zico.

Kiatisuk learned Vietnamese and speaks the language fluently just after a first couple of years during his career in Vietnam.

He has three daughters, their nicknames are Perth, Proud and Pearl.

== Career statistics ==
=== International goals ===
Scores and results list Thailand's goal tally first.

List of international goals scored by Kiatisuk Senamuang
| No. | Date | Venue | Opponent | Result | Competition |
|---|---|---|---|---|---|
| 1. | 11 April 1993 | Kobe, Japan | Sri Lanka | 1–0 | 1994 FIFA World Cup qualification |
| 2. | 5 May 1993 | Dubai, United Arab Emirates | Bangladesh | 4–1 | 1994 FIFA World Cup qualification |
| 3. | 7 June 1993 | Singapore | Myanmar | 2–0 | 1993 Southeast Asian Games |
| 4. | 13 June 1993 | Singapore | Laos | 4–1 | 1993 Southeast Asian Games |
| 5. | 20 June 1993 | Singapore | Myanmar | 4–3 | 1993 Southeast Asian Games |
| 6. | 9 October 1994 | Hiroshima, Japan | Malaysia | 1–1 | 1994 Asian Games |
| 7. | 12 December 1995 | Chiang Mai, Thailand | Cambodia | 9–0 | 1995 Southeast Asian Games |
| 8. | 12 December 1995 | Chiang Mai, Thailand | Cambodia | 9–0 | 1995 Southeast Asian Games |
| 9. | 16 February 1996 | Bangkok, Thailand | Finland | 5–2 | 1996 King's Cup |
| 10. | 27 June 1996 | Bangkok, Thailand | Maldives | 8–0 | 1996 AFC Asian Cup qualification |
| 11. | 27 June 1996 | Bangkok, Thailand | Maldives | 8–0 | 1996 AFC Asian Cup qualification |
| 12. | 29 June 1996 | Bangkok, Thailand | Myanmar | 5–1 | 1996 AFC Asian Cup qualification |
| 13. | 7 July 1996 | Singapore | Myanmar | 7–1 | 1996 AFC Asian Cup qualification |
| 14. | 7 July 1996 | Singapore | Myanmar | 7–1 | 1996 AFC Asian Cup qualification |
| 15. | 9 July 1996 | Singapore | Singapore | 2–2 | 1996 AFC Asian Cup qualification |
| 16. | 2 September 1996 | Singapore | Philippines | 5–0 | 1996 AFF Championship |
| 17. | 6 September 1996 | Singapore | Brunei | 6–0 | 1996 AFF Championship |
| 18. | 8 September 1996 | Singapore | Malaysia | 1–1 | 1996 AFF Championship |
| 19. | 13 September 1996 | Singapore | Vietnam | 4–2 | 1996 AFF Championship |
| 20. | 15 September 1996 | Singapore | Malaysia | 1–0 | 1996 AFF Championship |
| 21. | 8 December 1996 | Dubai, United Arab Emirates | Iran | 1–3 | 1996 AFC Asian Cup |
| 22. | 15 March 1997 | Bangkok, Thailand | Japan | 3–1 | Friendly |
| 23. | 15 March 1997 | Bangkok, Thailand | Japan | 3–1 | Friendly |
| 24. | 7 October 1997 | Jakarta, Indonesia | Brunei | 6–0 | 1997 Southeast Asian Games |
| 25. | 7 October 1997 | Jakarta, Indonesia | Brunei | 6–0 | 1997 Southeast Asian Games |
| 26. | 12 October 1997 | Jakarta, Indonesia | Cambodia | 4–0 | 1997 Southeast Asian Games |
| 27. | 16 October 1997 | Jakarta, Indonesia | Vietnam | 2–1 | 1997 Southeast Asian Games |
| 28. | 16 October 1997 | Jakarta, Indonesia | Vietnam | 2–1 | 1997 Southeast Asian Games |
| 29. | 22 March 1998 | Bangkok, Thailand | Kazakhstan | 1–0 | Friendly |
| 30. | 21 October 1998 | Bangkok, Thailand | Turkmenistan | 3–3 | Friendly |
| 31. | 2 December 1998 | Bangkok, Thailand | Hong Kong | 5–0 | 1998 Asian Games |
| 32. | 2 December 1998 | Bangkok, Thailand | Hong Kong | 5–0 | 1998 Asian Games |
| 33. | 14 December 1998 | Bangkok, Thailand | South Korea | 2–1 | 1998 Asian Games |
| 34. | 23 February 1999 | Bangkok, Thailand | North Korea | 2–2 | 1999 King's Cup |
| 35. | 16 June 1999 | Bangkok, Thailand | New Zealand | 2–2 | Friendly Tournament |
| 36. | 16 June 1999 | Bangkok, Thailand | New Zealand | 2–2 | Friendly Tournament |
| 37. | 30 July 1999 | Bandar Seri Begawan, Brunei | Philippines | 9–0 | 1999 Southeast Asian Games |
| 38. | 30 July 1999 | Bandar Seri Begawan, Brunei | Philippines | 9–0 | 1999 Southeast Asian Games |
| 39. | 30 July 1999 | Bandar Seri Begawan, Brunei | Philippines | 9–0 | 1999 Southeast Asian Games |
| 40. | 30 July 1999 | Bandar Seri Begawan, Brunei | Philippines | 9–0 | 1999 Southeast Asian Games |
| 41. | 1 August 1999 | Bandar Seri Begawan, Brunei | Laos | 4–1 | 1999 Southeast Asian Games |
| 42. | 8 August 1999 | Bandar Seri Begawan, Brunei | Myanmar | 7–0 | 1999 Southeast Asian Games |
| 43. | 8 August 1999 | Bandar Seri Begawan, Brunei | Myanmar | 7–0 | 1999 Southeast Asian Games |
| 44. | 6 November 2000 | Chiang Mai, Thailand | Myanmar | 3–1 | 2000 AFF Championship |
| 45. | 10 November 2000 | Chiang Mai, Thailand | Indonesia | 4–1 | 2000 AFF Championship |
| 46. | 12 November 2000 | Chiang Mai, Thailand | Philippines | 2–0 | 2000 AFF Championship |
| 47. | 16 November 2000 | Chiang Mai, Thailand | Malaysia | 2–0 | 2000 AFF Championship |
| 48. | 23 January 2001 | Bangkok, Thailand | Kuwait | 5–4 | Friendly |
| 49. | 23 January 2001 | Bangkok, Thailand | Kuwait | 5–4 | Friendly |
| 50. | 23 January 2001 | Bangkok, Thailand | Kuwait | 5–4 | Friendly |
| 51. | 17 February 2001 | Bangkok, Thailand | Qatar | 2–0 | 2001 King's Cup |
| 52. | 17 February 2001 | Bangkok, Thailand | Qatar | 2–0 | 2001 King's Cup |
| 53. | 13 May 2001 | Beirut, Lebanon | Sri Lanka | 4–2 | 2002 FIFA World Cup qualification |
| 54. | 13 May 2001 | Beirut, Lebanon | Sri Lanka | 4–2 | 2002 FIFA World Cup qualification |
| 55. | 17 May 2001 | Beirut, Lebanon | Lebanon | 2–1 | 2002 FIFA World Cup qualification |
| 56. | 26 May 2001 | Bangkok, Thailand | Sri Lanka | 3–0 | 2002 FIFA World Cup qualification |
| 57. | 26 May 2001 | Bangkok, Thailand | Sri Lanka | 3–0 | 2002 FIFA World Cup qualification |
| 58. | 28 May 2001 | Bangkok, Thailand | Pakistan | 6–0 | 2002 FIFA World Cup qualification |
| 59. | 28 May 2001 | Bangkok, Thailand | Pakistan | 6–0 | 2002 FIFA World Cup qualification |
| 60. | 28 May 2001 | Bangkok, Thailand | Pakistan | 6–0 | 2002 FIFA World Cup qualification |
| 61. | 28 May 2001 | Bangkok, Thailand | Pakistan | 6–0 | 2002 FIFA World Cup qualification |
| 62. | 13 August 2001 | Singapore | Singapore | 5–0 | Friendly |
| 63. | 13 August 2001 | Singapore | Singapore | 5–0 | Friendly |
| 64. | 6 September 2001 | Manama, Bahrain | Bahrain | 1–1 | 2002 FIFA World Cup qualification |
| 65. | 18 December 2002 | Singapore | Laos | 5–1 | 2002 AFF Championship |
| 66. | 18 December 2002 | Singapore | Laos | 5–1 | 2002 AFF Championship |
| 67. | 18 December 2002 | Singapore | Laos | 5–1 | 2002 AFF Championship |
| 68. | 31 March 2004 | Sana'a, Yemen | Yemen | 3–0 | 2006 FIFA World Cup qualification |
| 69. | 9 June 2004 | Bangkok, Thailand | North Korea | 1–4 | 2006 FIFA World Cup qualification |
| 70. | 26 December 2006 | Bangkok, Thailand | Singapore | 2–0 | 2006 King's Cup |
| 71. | 26 December 2006 | Bangkok, Thailand | Singapore | 2–0 | 2006 King's Cup |

== Managerial statistics ==
As of match played 12 May 2024

Managerial record by team and tenure
| Team | Nat | From | To | Record | | | | | | | |
| Team | Nat | From | To | G | W | D | L | GF | GA | GD | Win % |
|---|---|---|---|---|---|---|---|---|---|---|---|
| Hoàng Anh Gia Lai | (Vietnam) | 1 January 2006 | 30 June 2006 | 25 | 10 | 6 | 9 | 25 | 24 | +1 | 40.00 |
| Chula Sinthana | (Thailand) | 1 January 2008 | 30 November 2008 | 18 | 7 | 7 | 4 | 36 | 22 | +14 | 38.89 |
| Chonburi | (Thailand) | 1 January 2009 | 30 November 2009 | 46 | 28 | 11 | 7 | 87 | 42 | +45 | 60.87 |
| Hoàng Anh Gia Lai | (Vietnam) | 1 January 2010 | 30 November 2010 | 31 | 12 | 9 | 10 | 39 | 32 | +7 | 38.71 |
| Chula United | (Thailand) | 9 December 2010 | 21 May 2012 | 49 | 21 | 14 | 14 | 54 | 44 | +10 | 42.86 |
| Bangkok | (Thailand) | 20 June 2012 | 31 December 2012 | 21 | 7 | 5 | 9 | 31 | 33 | −2 | 33.33 |
| Thailand U23 | (Thailand) | 12 January 2013 | 22 December 2016 | 40 | 28 | 7 | 5 | 83 | 28 | +55 | 70.00 |
| Thailand ^{[2]} | (Thailand) | 1 May 2013 | 30 June 2013 | 1 | 1 | 0 | 0 | 5 | 1 | +4 | 100.00 |
| Thailand ^{[3]} | (Thailand) | 10 February 2014 | 31 March 2017 | 42 | 21 | 7 | 14 | 66 | 53 | +13 | 50.00 |
| Port | (Thailand) | 23 June 2017 | 20 September 2017 | 10 | 1 | 3 | 6 | 12 | 19 | −7 | 10.00 |
| Hoàng Anh Gia Lai | (Vietnam) | 20 November 2020 | 11 January 2024 | 74 | 24 | 28 | 22 | 82 | 79 | +3 | 32.43 |
| Công An Hà Nội | (Vietnam) | 16 January 2024 | 14 May 2024 | 11 | 6 | 1 | 4 | 16 | 12 | +4 | 54.55 |
| Career Total | | | | 368 | 166 | 98 | 104 | 536 | 389 | +147 | 45.11 |

^{1} A win or loss by penalty shoot-out is counted as a draw.
^{2} Kiatisuk Senamuang managed the team on a one-off basis as caretaker-manager.
^{3} Only FIFA approved games are counted for Thailand.

== Honours ==
=== Player ===
Thailand

- AFF Championship: 1996, 2000, 2002
- Sea Games gold medal: 1993, 1995, 1997, 1999
- King's Cup: 1994, 2000, 2006
- Indonesian Independence Cup: 1994
- Asian Games fourth place: 1998, 2002

Krung Thai Bank

- Kor Royal Cup: 1989
- Khǒr Royal Cup: 1993

Singapore Armed Forces

- S.League: 2002

Hoang Anh Gia Lai

- V.League 1: 2003, 2004
- Vietnamese Super Cup: 2003, 2004

Individual

- AFF Championship Most Valuable Player: 2000
- V.League 1 Best Foreign Player of the year: 2003, 2004
- AFC Asian All Stars: 2000

=== Manager ===
Thailand

- AFF Championship: 2014, 2016
- King's Cup: 2016

Thailand U-23

- SEA Games gold medal: 2013
- Asian Games fourth place: 2014

Chonburi

- Kor Royal Cup: 2009

Hoang Anh Gia Lai

- Vietnamese National Cup runner-up: 2010
- Quang Trung Emperor's Cup: 2022

Individual

- ASEAN Football Federation Coach of the Year: 2015, 2017
- V.League 1 Manager of the Month: January 2021, March 2021, April 2021, July 2022

== In popular culture ==
Kiatisuk became the first Thai footballer along with some others to appear in a video game when he appeared in World Soccer Jikkyou Winning Eleven 2000: U-23 Medal Heno Chousen as a player of the Thailand U-23 team. His name in the game is "Senamuran" (セナムラン).

== See also ==
- List of men's footballers with 100 or more international caps
- List of men's footballers with 50 or more international goals
- Top international football goalscorers by country
