= 2000 AFF Championship =

2000 อาเซียนฟุตบอลแชมเปียนชิพ

Tournament details
- Host country: Thailand
- Dates: 5–18 November
- Teams: 9
- Venues: 3 (in 3 host cities)

Final positions
- Champions: Thailand (2nd title)
- Runners-up: Indonesia
- Third place: Malaysia
- Fourth place: Vietnam

Tournament statistics
- Matches played: 20
- Goals scored: 67 (3.35 per match)
- Top scorer(s): (Indonesia) Gendut Doni (Thailand) Worrawoot Srimaka (5 goals each)
- Best player: (Thailand) Kiatisuk Senamuang
- Fair play award: Malaysia

The 2000 AFF Championship, officially known as the 2000 Tiger Cup, was the third edition of the AFF Championship and was held in Thailand from 5 to 18 November 2000.

Singapore had been the defending champions, but was eliminated in group stage. Thailand won the tournament by a 4–1 victory in the final against Indonesia to secure their second title.

== Teams ==
No qualification was required for this edition of the tournament and national teams from nine of the ten member associations of the ASEAN Football Federation have entered. Brunei withdrew due to "unforeseen circumstances".

The participating nations:

- Cambodia
- Indonesia
- Laos
- Malaysia
- Myanmar
- Philippines
- Singapore
- Thailand
- Vietnam

== Venues ==
Thailand
Knockout Stage	Group Stage	
Bangkok	Chiang Mai	Songkhla
Rajamangala Stadium	700th Anniversary Stadium	Tinsulanon Stadium
Capacity: 80,000	Capacity: 25,000	Capacity: 20,000
2000 AFF Championship is located in Thailand

== Match officials ==
Referees	Assistant Referees
(Indonesia) Hidayat Jajat Sudrajat (Malaysia) Mohammad Nazri Abdullah (Myanmar) U Tun Hla Aung (Philippines) Jerry Andres (Singapore) S. Kumbalingam Kennedy (Thailand) Hanlumyaung Panya (Vietnam) Nguyễn Văn Mùi	(Cambodia) Ly Ratana (Indonesia) Rafli A Razak (Laos) Phonesirignavong Phoneapeuth (Malaysia) Kassim Kadir Bacha (Myanmar) U Hla Myint Hla (Philippines) Celso Soldevilla (Thailand) Klienklard Sitthikhun (Vietnam) Trương Thế Toàn

== Group stage ==
All times are Thailand Standard Time - (THA) UTC+7

=== Group A ===
- All matches were played in Chiang Mai, Thailand.

Team	Pld	W	D	L	GF	GA	GD	Pts
Thailand (H)	3	3	0	0	9	2	+7	9
Indonesia	3	2	0	1	9	4	+5	6
Myanmar	3	1	0	2	4	8	−4	3
Philippines	3	0	0	3	0	8	−8	0

6 November 2000
16:00

Indonesia	3–0	Philippines
Aji Santoso 31'; Kurniawan Dwi Yulianto 58'; Eko Purdjianto 84'

700th Anniversary Stadium, Chiang Mai
Referee: Mohd Nazri Abdullah (Malaysia)

6 November 2000
19:00

Thailand	3–1	Myanmar
Kiatisuk Senamuang 4'; Sakesan Pituratana 47'; Surachai Jaturapattarapong 74'		Aung Kyaw Tun 62'

700th Anniversary Stadium, Chiang Mai
Referee: S. Kumbalingam Kennedy (Singapore)

8 November 2000
19:00 (Note: ThaiFootball.com reports this kick-off time as 16:00.)

Myanmar	3–0	Philippines
Thet Naing Soe 65'; Zaw Htike 69'; Nay Thu Hlaing 71'

700th Anniversary Stadium, Chiang Mai
Referee: Nguyễn Văn Mùi (Vietnam)

10 November 2000
19:00

Thailand	4–1	Indonesia
Worrawoot Srimaka 25', 49'; Kiatisuk Senamuang 52'; Dusit Chalermsan 79'		Gendut Doni Christiawan 57'

700th Anniversary Stadium, Chiang Mai
Referee: Mohd Nazri Abdullah (Malaysia)

12 November 2000
16:00

Myanmar	0–5	Indonesia
		Gendut Doni Christiawan 43', 57'; Uston Nawawi 70'; Kurniawan Dwi Yulianto 74', 82'

700th Anniversary Stadium, Chiang Mai
Referee: S. Kumbalingam Kennedy (Singapore)

12 November 2000
19:00

Thailand	2–0	Philippines
Kiatisuk Senamuang 4'; Anurak Srikerd 14'

700th Anniversary Stadium, Chiang Mai
Referee: Nguyễn Văn Mùi (Vietnam)

=== Group B ===
All matches were played in Songkhla, Thailand.

Team	Pld	W	D	L	GF	GA	GD	Pts
Vietnam	4	3	1	0	12	0	+12	10
Malaysia	4	3	1	0	9	2	+7	10
Singapore	4	2	0	2	4	2	+2	6
Cambodia	4	1	0	3	5	10	−5	3
Laos	4	0	0	4	0	16	−16	0

5 November 2000
16:30

Singapore	1–0	Cambodia
Rafi Ali 25'

Tinsulanon Stadium, Songkhla
Referee: U Tun Hla Aung (Myanmar)

5 November 2000
19:00

Vietnam	0–0	Malaysia

Tinsulanon Stadium, Songkhla
Referee: Hanlumyaung Panya (Thailand)

7 November 2000
16:30

Laos	0–5	Malaysia
		Rusdi Suparman 24', 54'; Azman Adnan 31' (pen.); Hairuddin Omar 43'; Ahmad Shahrul Azhar Sofian 89'

Tinsulanon Stadium, Songkhla
Referee: Jerry Andres (Philippines)

7 November 2000
19:30

Cambodia	0–6	Vietnam
		Lê Huỳnh Đức 16', 80'; Nguyễn Văn Sỹ 55'; Nguyễn Hồng Sơn 58'; Vũ Công Tuyền 74', 86'

Tinsulanon Stadium, Songkhla
Referee: Hidayat Jajat Sudrajat (Indonesia)

9 November 2000
16:30

Malaysia	3–2	Cambodia
Azman Adnan 21'; Hairuddin Omar 47'; Ahmad Shahrul Azhar Sofian 62'		Pok Chanthan 74'; Hok Sochetra 86'

Tinsulanon Stadium, Songkhla
Referee: Hidayat Jajat Sudrajat (Indonesia)

9 November 2000
19:30

Singapore	3–0	Laos
Rafi Ali 8'; Nazri Nasir 22'; Steven Tan Teng Chuan 90'

Tinsulanon Stadium, Songkhla
Referee: U Tun Hla Aung (Myanmar)

11 November 2000
16:30

Cambodia	3–0	Laos
Hok Sochetra 59', 76'; Chea Makara 70'

Tinsulanon Stadium, Songkhla
Referee: Jerry Andres (Philippines)

11 November 2000
19:30

Vietnam	1–0	Singapore
Lê Huỳnh Đức 62'

Tinsulanon Stadium, Songkhla
Referee: Hanlumyaung Panya (Thailand)

13 November 2000
16:30

Malaysia	1–0	Singapore
Azman Adnan 63'

Tinsulanon Stadium, Songkhla
Referee: U Tun Hla Aung (Myanmar)

13 November 2000
19:00

Laos	0–5	Vietnam
		Văn Sỹ Thủy 8'; Vũ Công Tuyền 18'; Nguyễn Văn Sỹ 50'; Vũ Minh Hiếu 61'; Phạm Hùng Dũng 88'

Tinsulanon Stadium, Songkhla
Referee: Hanlumyaung Panya (Thailand)

== Knockout stage ==
=== Bracket ===
Semi-finals
16 November 2000
Vietnam	2
Indonesia (a.e.t.)	3
16 November 2000
Thailand	2
Malaysia	0

Final
18 November 2000
Indonesia	1
Thailand	4
Third place
18 November 2000
Vietnam	0
Malaysia	3

=== Semi-finals ===
16 November 2000
16:00

Vietnam	2–3 (a.e.t.)	Indonesia
Nguyễn Hồng Sơn 45'; Vũ Công Tuyền 90'		Gendut Doni Christiawan 39' 120'; Seto Nurdiantoro 75'

Rajamangala Stadium, Bangkok
Referee: S. Kumbalingam Kennedy (Singapore)

16 November 2000
19:00

Thailand	2–0	Malaysia
Kiatisuk Senamuang 30'; Tawan Sripan 35'

Rajamangala Stadium, Bangkok
Referee: U Tun Hla Aung (Myanmar)

=== Third place play-off ===
18 November 2000
16:00

Vietnam	0–3	Malaysia
		Rosdi Talib 42'; Rusdi Suparman 59', 90'

Rajamangala Stadium, Bangkok
Referee: Hanlumyaung Panya (Thailand)

=== Final ===
18 November 2000
19:00

Thailand	4–1	Indonesia
Worrawoot Srimaka 14', 18', 32'; Tanongsak Prajakkata 65'		Uston Nawawi 20'

Rajamangala Stadium, Bangkok
Referee: Mohd Nazri Abdullah (Malaysia)

== Awards ==
2000 AFF Championship

Thailand
Second title

Most Valuable Player	Golden Boot	Fair Play Award
(Thailand) Kiatisuk Senamuang	(Indonesia) Gendut Christiawan (Thailand) Worrawoot Srimaka	Malaysia

== Goalscorers ==
5 goals

- (Indonesia) Gendut Doni Christiawan
- (Thailand) Worrawoot Srimaka

4 goals

- (Malaysia) Rusdi Suparman
- (Thailand) Kiatisuk Senamuang
- (Vietnam) Vũ Công Tuyền

3 goals

- (Cambodia) Hok Sochetra
- (Indonesia) Kurniawan Dwi Yulianto
- (Malaysia) Azman Adnan
- (Vietnam) Lê Huỳnh Đức

2 goals

- (Indonesia) Uston Nawawi
- (Malaysia) Ahmad Shahrul Azhar Sofian
- (Malaysia) Hairuddin Omar
- (Singapore) Rafi Ali
- (Vietnam) Nguyễn Hồng Sơn

1 goal

- (Cambodia) Pok Chanthan
- (Cambodia) Chea Makara

1 goal

- (Indonesia) Aji Santoso
- (Indonesia) Eko Purdjianto
- (Indonesia) Seto Nurdiantoro
- (Malaysia) Rosdi Talib
- (Myanmar) Aung Kyaw Tun
- (Myanmar) Thet Naing Soe
- (Myanmar) Zaw Htike
- (Myanmar) Nay Thu Hlaing
- (Singapore) Nazri Nasir
- (Singapore) Steven Tan Teng Chuan
- (Thailand) Sakesan Pituratana
- (Thailand) Surachai Jaturapattarapong
- (Thailand) Dusit Chalermsan
- (Thailand) Anurak Srikerd
- (Thailand) Tawan Sripan
- (Thailand) Tanongsak Prajakkata
- (Vietnam) Nguyễn Văn Sỹ
- (Vietnam) Phạm Hùng Dũng
- (Vietnam) Vũ Minh Hiếu
- (Vietnam) Văn Sỹ Thủy

== Team statistics ==
This table will show the ranking of teams throughout the tournament.

Pos	Team	Pld	W	D	L	GF	GA	GD
Finals
1	Thailand	5	5	0	0	15	3	+12
2	Indonesia	5	3	0	2	13	10	+3
Semifinals
3	Malaysia	6	4	1	1	12	4	+8
4	Vietnam	6	3	1	2	14	6	+8
Eliminated in the group stage
5	Singapore	4	2	0	2	4	2	+2
6	Myanmar	3	1	0	2	4	8	–4
7	Cambodia	4	1	0	3	5	10	–5
8	Philippines	3	0	0	3	0	8	–8
9	Laos	4	0	0	4	0	16	–16
