= 700th Anniversary Stadium =

Stadium in Chiang Mai, Thailand

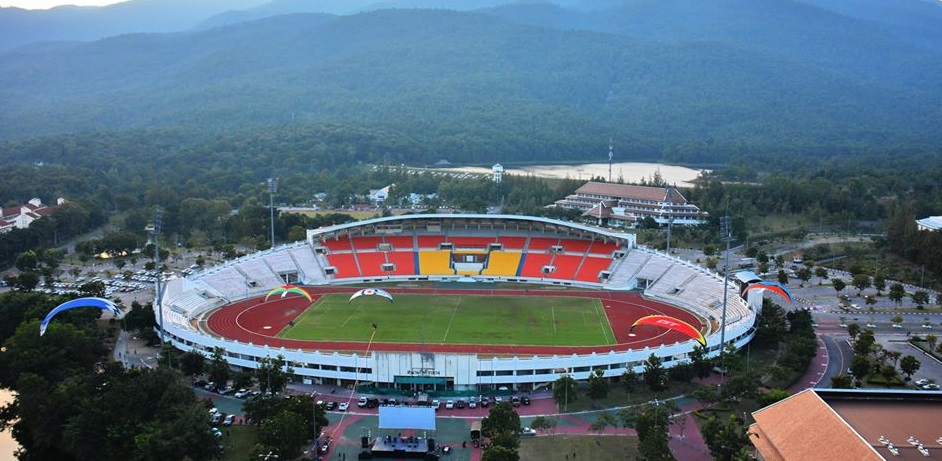
- 700th Anniversary Stadium in 2014
- Interactive map of 700th Anniversary Stadium
- Full name: 700th Anniversary of Chiang Mai Stadium
- Location: Don Kaeo, Mae Rim, Chiang Mai, Thailand
- Coordinates: 18°50′23″N 98°57′34″E
- Owner: Sports Authority of Thailand (SAT)
- Operator: Sports Authority of Thailand (SAT)
- Capacity: 17,909
- Surface: Grass
- Public transit: Red Line (from 2027)

Construction
- Opened: 1995

Tenants
- Chiangmai; Chiangmai United; Lamphun Warriors (2022–23)

The 700th Anniversary of Chiang Mai Stadium (Thai: สนามเชียงใหม่ 700 ปี) is a multi-purpose stadium in Chiang Mai, Chiang Mai Province, Thailand, built to host the 1995 Southeast Asian Games and to commemorate the 700th anniversary of Chiang Mai's establishment at the same time. It was also used for the 1998 Asian Games. Football side Chiangmai F.C. returned to the stadium for the 2009 season, having used a municipal stadium elsewhere in the city in recent years.

Navamin Reservoir (อ่างเก็บน้ำนวมินทร์), also known as Mae Jok Luang Reservoir (อ่างเก็บน้ำแม่จอกหลวง), is located directly behind the stadium.

== Architecture ==
Architecturally, the stadium is clearly a forebear of the 80th Birthday Stadium in Nakhon Ratchasima. A continuous single tier, almost a perfect circle, rises up on one side to form a large main stand which provides covered accommodation for 4,500 spectators. Only the main stand is covered the rest of the all seater stadium is uncovered.
