= ASEAN Championship =

Southeast Asian men's football tournament

- Organiser(s): ASEAN Football Federation (AFF)
- Founded: 1996; 30 years ago
- Region: Southeast Asia
- Teams: 10 (final tournament)
- Qualifier for: AFF–EAFF Champions Trophy
- Current champions: Vietnam (4th title)
- Most championships: Thailand (7 titles)
- Website: aseanutdfc.com
- Editions: 1996; 1998; 2000; 2002; 2004; 2007; 2008; 2010; 2012; 2014; 2016; 2018; 2020; 2022; 2024; 2026

The ASEAN Championship (formerly known as the AFF Championship or AFF Cup), currently known as the ASEAN Hyundai Cup for sponsorship reasons, is the biennial football tournament organised by the ASEAN Football Federation (AFF) for men's national teams in Southeast Asia.

A biennial international competition, it is contested to determine the sub-continental champion of Southeast Asia. The competition has been held every two years since 1996, scheduled to be in the even-numbered year, except for 2007 and 2020.

Four national teams have won the ASEAN Championship title; Thailand has won seven titles, Singapore and Vietnam four each, and Malaysia one. To date, only three teams have won consecutive titles: Thailand did it three times in 2000, 2002, 2014, 2016, 2020, and 2022, Singapore did it once in 2004 and 2007, and Vietnam did it once in 2024 and 2026. Australia, an AFF member since 2013, has not played the ASEAN Championship. It is one of the most watched football tournaments in the region. The ASEAN Championship is recognised as an 'A' international tournament by FIFA with FIFA ranking points being awarded since 1996.

Since 2018, the championship winners would compete in the following AFF–EAFF Champions Trophy, against the winner of the EAFF E-1 Football Championship (East Asia).

The defending tournament champions are Vietnam, after a 4–2 aggregate victory over Thailand in the 2026 ASEAN Championship final.

FIFA president Gianni Infantino announced the launch of the FIFA ASEAN Cup on 26 October 2025 during the 2025 ASEAN Summits in Kuala Lumpur, although no further details about its format were disclosed until the two-division structure and host countries were confirmed after the 2026 FIFA Congress in Vancouver.

== History ==
ASEAN Championship Trophy

The first ASEAN Championship took place in 1996 with the six founding members of the ASEAN Federation competing with four nations being invited that came in that region. The final saw Thailand becoming the first champions of ASEAN as they defeated Malaysia 1–0 in Singapore. The top four nations automatically qualified through to the finals in the following edition. This meant the other six nations had to compete in qualifying for the remaining four spots. Myanmar, Singapore, Laos and Philippines all made it through to the main tournament. The tournament was the only regional competition for national teams when men's football at the SEA Games was for U23 starting in 2001, until the FIFA ASEAN Cup launched in 2026 (see below). No country has ever won the ASEAN Championship title three times in a row. Singapore (2004 and 2007), Thailand (2000 and 2002, 2014 and 2016, and 2020 and 2022) and Vietnam (2024 and 2026) have won twice in a row.

In February 2024, the AFF announced that the competition will be rebranded as the ASEAN Championship.

Although having joined the AFF on 27 August 2013, Australia, because of its superior level compared to Southeast Asia, has not played the ASEAN Championship as part of the initial agreement, though Australia has started searching for ways to enter the tournament in recent years due to growth of various Southeast Asian national teams, due to internal pressures, and due to Southeast Asian interests in seeing more competitive football to improve consistency.

On October 26, 2025, FIFA announced the launch of the FIFA ASEAN Cup following the signing of a memorandum of agreement at the 47th ASEAN Summit. It was initially unclear what implication the new FIFA tournament would mean for the conduct of the ASEAN Championship, but after the 76th FIFA Congress, FIFA and the ASEAN Football Federation signed a memorandum of understanding confirming the tournament's two-division structure and host countries.

== Organisation ==
Sports marketing, media, and event management firm, Sportfive (formerly Lagardère Sports) has been involved in the tournament since the inaugural edition in 1996.

=== Title sponsorship ===
It was founded as the Tiger Cup, after Singapore-based Asia Pacific Breweries brand Tiger Beer sponsored the competition from its inauguration in 1996 until the 2004 edition. After Asia Pacific Breweries withdrew as title sponsor, the competition was known simply as the AFF Championship for the 2007 edition. In 2008, Suzuki bought the naming rights for the competition and the competition was named the AFF Suzuki Cup until the 2020 edition. On 23 May 2022, AFF announced a new title sponsorship deal with Mitsubishi Electric and the competition was named the AFF Mitsubishi Electric Cup starting in the 2022 edition.

As part of the competition's rebranding in February 2024, the competition was renamed to the ASEAN Mitsubishi Electric Cup. In May 2025, AFF announced Hyundai Motor Company to be the next title sponsor for the tournament, naming it the ASEAN Hyundai Cup.

Period	Sponsor	Name
1996–2004	Tiger Beer	Tiger Cup
2007	No title sponsor	AFF Championship
2008–2020	Suzuki	AFF Suzuki Cup
2022	Mitsubishi Electric	AFF Mitsubishi Electric Cup
2024	Mitsubishi Electric	ASEAN Mitsubishi Electric Cup
2026–present	Hyundai Motor	ASEAN Hyundai Cup

=== Official Match Ball ===
Official Match Ball through the years
Year	Official match ball name	Manufacturer
1996	Adidas Questra	Adidas
1998	Adidas Tricolore	Adidas
2000	Adidas Tricolore	Adidas
2002	Adidas Fevernova	Adidas
2004	Adidas Roteiro	Adidas
2007	Nike Total 90 Aerow II (Yellow winter)	Nike
2008	Nike Total 90 Omni (Yellow winter)	Nike
2010	Nike Total 90 Tracer (Yellow winter)	Nike
2012	Nike Maxim (Yellow winter)	Nike
2014	Mitre Delta V12S	Mitre
2016	Mitre Delta Fluo Hyperseam (Yellow winter)	Mitre
2018	Grand Sport Primero Mundo X Star	Grand Sport
2020	Warrix Asean Pulse	Warrix
2022	Warrix Bersatu	Warrix
2024	Adidas Tiro Pro (Iron Metallic / Power Red)	Adidas
2026	Adidas Tiro Pro (Teamgeist)	Adidas

== Format ==
Since 2004, the knockout stage has been played over two legs in a home-and-away format. Since the 2007 edition, there was no third-place match; semi-finalists are listed in alphabetical order. The away goals rule was applied for the knockout stage in 2010-2022 editions. (Note: Except the 2020 edition due to all matches being hosted in the centralised venue, Singapore.)

Starting with the 2018 edition, a new format for group state was applied. The nine highest-ranked teams qualified automatically while the 10th and 11th ranked teams played in a two-legged qualifier to determine the final team to qualify. The 10 teams were split into two groups of five and played a round-robin system, with each team playing two home and two away fixtures. A draw was made to determine where the teams played while the format of the knockout round remained unchanged.

== Results ==
Regular format (1996–2002)
Year	Host(s)	Final			Third place playoff			Number of teams	Total matches played	Total goals in tournament
Year	Host(s)	Winners	Score	Runners-up	Third place	Score	Fourth place	Number of teams	Total matches played	Total goals in tournament
1996	Singapore	Thailand	1–0	Malaysia	Vietnam	3–2	Indonesia	10	24	93
1998	Vietnam	Singapore	1–0	Vietnam	Indonesia	3–3 (a.e.t.) (5–4 p)	Thailand	8	16	55
2000	Thailand	Thailand	4–1	Indonesia	Malaysia	3–0	Vietnam	9	20	67
2002	Indonesia; Singapore	Thailand	2–2 (a.e.t.) (4–2 p)	Indonesia	Vietnam	2–1	Malaysia	9	20	92
Home-and-away format in knockout (2004–2016)
Year	Group stage hosts	Final			Third-place playoff or losing semi-finalists			Number of teams	Total matches played	Total goals in tournament
Year	Group stage hosts	Winners	Score	Runners-up	Third place	Score	Fourth place	Number of teams	Total matches played	Total goals in tournament
2004	Malaysia; Vietnam	Singapore	3–1; 2–1	Indonesia	Malaysia	2–1	Myanmar	10	27	113
2004	Malaysia; Vietnam	won 5–2 on aggregate			Malaysia	2–1	Myanmar	10	27	113
2007	Singapore; Thailand	Singapore	2–1; 1–1	Thailand	Malaysia and Vietnam			8	18	50
2007	Singapore; Thailand	won 3–2 on aggregate			Malaysia and Vietnam			8	18	50
2008	Indonesia; Thailand	Vietnam	2–1; 1–1	Thailand	Indonesia and Singapore			8	18	56
2008	Indonesia; Thailand	won 3–2 on aggregate			Indonesia and Singapore			8	18	56
2010	Indonesia; Vietnam	Malaysia	3–0; 1–2	Indonesia	Philippines and Vietnam			8	18	51
2010	Indonesia; Vietnam	won 4–2 on aggregate			Philippines and Vietnam			8	18	51
2012	Malaysia; Thailand	Singapore	3–1; 0–1	Thailand	Malaysia and Philippines			8	18	48
2012	Malaysia; Thailand	won 3–2 on aggregate			Malaysia and Philippines			8	18	48
2014	Singapore; Vietnam	Thailand	2–0; 2–3	Malaysia	Philippines and Vietnam			8	18	65
2014	Singapore; Vietnam	won 4–3 on aggregate			Philippines and Vietnam			8	18	65
2016	Myanmar; Philippines	Thailand	1–2; 2–0	Indonesia	Myanmar and Vietnam			8	18	50
2016	Myanmar; Philippines	won 3–2 on aggregate			Myanmar and Vietnam			8	18	50
Home-and-away format throughout the tournament (2018–present)
Year		Final			Losing semi-finalists			Number of teams	Total matches played	Total goals in tournament
Year		Winners	Score	Runners-up	Losing semi-finalists			Number of teams	Total matches played	Total goals in tournament
2018		Vietnam	2–2; 1–0	Malaysia	Philippines and Thailand			10	26	80
2018		won 3–2 on aggregate			Philippines and Thailand			10	26	80
2020 (Note: The 2020 AFF Championship was postponed to 2021 due to the COVID-19 pandemic and hosted in a centralized venue. On 28 September 2021, it was announced that Singapore would host the tournament. Knockout stage had been kept playing over two legs without away goal rule.)		Thailand (Note: Due to non-compliance with conditions set by the World Anti-Doping Agency (WADA), Thailand and Indonesia were not allowed to be represented by their national flags. The sanctions took effect in October 2021. Thailand is represented by its national team logo while Indonesia is represented by its coat of arms.)	4–0; 2–2	Indonesia	Singapore and Vietnam			10	26	88
2020		won 6–2 on aggregate			Singapore and Vietnam			10	26	88
2022		Thailand	2–2; 1–0	Vietnam	Indonesia and Malaysia			10	26	90
2022		won 3–2 on aggregate			Indonesia and Malaysia			10	26	90
2024		Vietnam	2–1; 3–2	Thailand	Philippines and Singapore			10	26	92
2024		won 5–3 on aggregate			Philippines and Singapore			10	26	92
2026		Vietnam	2–0; 2–2	Thailand	Malaysia and Singapore			10	26	87
2026		won 4–2 on aggregate			Malaysia and Singapore			10	26	87

== Comprehensive team results by tournament ==
Team	(Singapore) 1996 (10)	(Vietnam) 1998 (8)	(Thailand) 2000 (9)	(Indonesia) (Singapore) 2002 (9)	(Malaysia) (Vietnam) (Indonesia) (Singapore) 2004 (10)	(Singapore) (Thailand) (Malaysia) (Vietnam) 2007 (8)	(Indonesia) (Thailand) (Singapore) (Vietnam) 2008 (8)	(Indonesia) (Vietnam) (Malaysia) 2010 (8)	(Malaysia) (Thailand) (Philippines) (Singapore) 2012 (8)	(Singapore) (Vietnam) (Malaysia) (Philippines) (Thailand) 2014 (8)	(Myanmar) (Philippines) (Indonesia) (Thailand) (Vietnam) 2016 (8)	(ASEAN) 2018 (10)	(Singapore) 2020 (10)	(ASEAN) 2022 (10)	(ASEAN) 2024 (10)	(ASEAN) 2026 (10)	Total
Australia	OFC member					AFC member				×	×	×	×	×	×	×	0
Brunei	GS	•	×	×	×	•	•	×	•	•	•	•	×	GS	•	•	2
Cambodia	GS	•	GS	GS	GS	•	GS	•	•	•	GS	GS	GS	GS	GS	GS	11
Indonesia	4th	3rd	2nd	2nd	2nd	GS	SF	2nd	GS	GS	2nd	GS	2nd	SF	GS	GS	16
Laos	GS	GS	GS	GS	GS	GS	GS	GS	GS	GS	•	GS	GS	GS	GS	GS	15
Malaysia	2nd	GS	3rd	4th	3rd	SF	GS	1st	SF	2nd	GS	2nd	GS	SF	GS	SF	16
Myanmar	GS	GS	GS	GS	4th	GS	GS	GS	GS	GS	SF	GS	GS	GS	GS	GS	16
Philippines	GS	GS	GS	GS	GS	GS	•	SF	SF	SF	GS	SF	GS	GS	SF	GS	15
Singapore	GS	1st	GS	GS	1st	1st	SF	GS	1st	GS	GS	GS	SF	GS	SF	SF	16
Thailand	1st	4th	1st	1st	GS	2nd	2nd	GS	2nd	1st	1st	SF	1st	1st	2nd	2nd	16
Timor-Leste	Part of Indonesia			×	GS	•	•	•	•	•	•	GS	GS	•	GS	GS	5
Vietnam	3rd	2nd	4th	3rd	GS	SF	1st	SF	GS	SF	SF	1st	SF	2nd	1st	1st	16

Legend

- 1st – Champions
- 2nd – Runners-up
- 3rd – Third place
- 4th – Fourth place
- SF – Semi-finalist
- GS – Group stage
- Q – Qualified for the current tournament
- •• — Qualified but withdrew
- • – Did not qualify
- × – Did not enter / Withdrew / Banned
- – Hosts / Group stage's hosts

== Awards ==
Tournament	Most valuable player	Top goalscorer(s)	Goals	Young player of the tournament	Fair play award	Winning coach
1996	(Malaysia) Zainal Abidin Hassan	(Thailand) Natipong Sritong-In	7	Not awarded	Brunei	(Thailand) Thawatchai Sartjakul
1998	(Vietnam) Nguyễn Hồng Sơn	(Myanmar) Myo Hlaing Win	4	Not awarded	Not awarded	(England) Barry Whitbread
2000	(Thailand) Kiatisuk Senamuang	(Indonesia) Gendut Doni Christiawan (Thailand) Worrawoot Srimaka	5	Not awarded	Malaysia	(England) Peter Withe
2002	(Thailand) Therdsak Chaiman	(Indonesia) Bambang Pamungkas	8	Not awarded	Not awarded	(England) Peter Withe
2004	(Singapore) Lionel Lewis	(Indonesia) Ilham Jaya Kesuma	7	Not awarded	Not awarded	(Serbia) Radojko Avramović
2007	(Singapore) Noh Alam Shah	(Singapore) Noh Alam Shah	10	Not awarded	Not awarded	(Serbia) Radojko Avramović
2008	(Vietnam) Dương Hồng Sơn	(Indonesia) Budi Sudarsono (Singapore) Agu Casmir (Thailand) Teerasil Dangda	4	Not awarded	Thailand	(Portugal) Henrique Calisto
2010	(Indonesia) Firman Utina	(Malaysia) Safee Sali	5	Not awarded	Philippines	(Malaysia) K. Rajagopal
2012	(Singapore) Shahril Ishak	(Thailand) Teerasil Dangda	5	Not awarded	Malaysia	(Serbia) Radojko Avramović
2014	(Thailand) Chanathip Songkrasin	(Malaysia) Safiq Rahim	6	Not awarded	Vietnam	(Thailand) Kiatisuk Senamuang (Note: Became the only individual to win the competition as both a player (1996, 2000, 2002) and coach (2014, 2016).)
2016	(Thailand) Chanathip Songkrasin	(Thailand) Teerasil Dangda	6	Not awarded	Thailand	(Thailand) Kiatisuk Senamuang
2018	(Vietnam) Nguyễn Quang Hải	(Thailand) Adisak Kraisorn	8	Not awarded	Malaysia	(South Korea) Park Hang-seo
2020	(Thailand) Chanathip Songkrasin	(Malaysia) Safawi Rasid (Philippines) Bienvenido Marañón (Thailand) Chanathip Songkrasin (Thailand) Teerasil Dangda	4	(Indonesia) Pratama Arhan	Indonesia	(Brazil) Alexandré Pölking
2022	(Thailand) Theerathon Bunmathan	(Thailand) Teerasil Dangda (Vietnam) Nguyễn Tiến Linh	6	(Indonesia) Marselino Ferdinan	Malaysia	(Brazil) Alexandré Pölking
2024	(Vietnam) Nguyễn Xuân Son	(Vietnam) Nguyễn Xuân Son	7	(Thailand) Suphanat Mueanta	Not awarded	(South Korea) Kim Sang-sik
2026	(Vietnam) Nguyễn Đình Bắc	(Vietnam) Nguyễn Đình Bắc (Vietnam) Nguyễn Xuân Son	5	(Thailand) Yotsakorn Burapha	Not awarded	(South Korea) Kim Sang-sik

== Records and statistics ==
=== Team records ===
==== Overall team records ====
In this ranking 3 points are awarded for a win, 1 for a draw and 0 for a loss. As per statistical convention in football, matches decided in extra time are counted as wins and losses, while matches decided by penalty shoot-outs are counted as draws. Teams are ranked by total points, then by goal difference, then by goals scored.

As of 2026 ASEAN Championship

Rank	Team	Part	Pld	W	D	L	GF	GA	GD	Pts
1	Thailand	16	96	61	20	15	220	108	+112	203
2	Vietnam	16	89	49	24	16	189	83	+106	171
3	Indonesia	16	82	41	18	23	201	135	+66	141
4	Singapore	16	75	37	18	20	130	79	+51	129
5	Malaysia	16	82	37	17	28	142	96	+46	128
6	Myanmar	16	56	17	9	30	71	122	–51	60
7	Philippines	15	56	14	7	35	67	72	–5	49
8	Cambodia	11	40	7	1	32	48	125	–77	22
9	Laos	15	52	2	8	42	40	194	–154	14
10	Brunei	2	8	1	0	7	3	37	–34	3
11	Timor-Leste	5	19	0	0	19	9	80	–71	0

==== Teams reaching the top two ====
Team	Champions	Runners-up
Thailand	7 (1996, 2000, 2002, 2014, 2016, 2020, 2022)	5 (2007, 2008, 2012, 2024, 2026)
Vietnam	4 (2008, 2018, 2024, 2026)	2 (1998, 2022)
Singapore	4 (1998, 2004, 2007, 2012)	0
Malaysia	1 (2010)	3 (1996, 2014, 2018)
Indonesia	0	6 (2000, 2002, 2004, 2010, 2016, 2020)
Total	16	16

=== Player records ===
==== All time top goalscorers ====
As of 2026 final

Rank	Player	Goals
1	(Thailand) Teerasil Dangda	25
2	(Singapore) Noh Alam Shah	17
3	(Thailand) Worrawoot Srimaka	15
3	(Vietnam) Lê Công Vinh	15
5	(Vietnam) Lê Huỳnh Đức	14
6	(Indonesia) Kurniawan Dwi Yulianto	13
6	(Thailand) Adisak Kraisorn	13
6	(Vietnam) Nguyễn Tiến Linh	13
9	(Indonesia) Bambang Pamungkas	12
9	(Thailand) Kiatisuk Senamuang	12
9	(Vietnam) Nguyễn Xuân Son	12

==== Most successful player ====
- Sarach Yooyen – 4 titles (Thailand, 2014, 2016, 2020, 2022)

==== Most goals scored in a single tournament ====
- Noh Alam Shah – 10 (Singapore, 2007)

==== Most goals scored in a match ====
- Noh Alam Shah – 7 (for Singapore vs Laos, 2007)

==== Most tournaments scored in ====
- Teerasil Dangda – 5 (Thailand, 2008, 2012, 2016, 2020, and 2022)

==== First ever hat-trick ====
- K. Sanbagamaran – 53 minutes (for Malaysia vs Philippines on 4 September 1996)

==== Fastest hat-trick ====
- Sarayuth Chaikamdee – 4 minutes (for Thailand vs Timor-Leste on 12 December 2004)

==== Youngest player ====
- Zenivio – 16 years 7 months 13 days old (for Timor-Leste vs Thailand on 5 December 2021)

==== Youngest goal scorer ====
- Marselino Ferdinan – 18 years 3 months 24 days (for Indonesia vs Philippines on 2 January 2023)

==== Oldest player ====
- Hassan Sunny – 38 years 9 months 1 day old (for Singapore vs Malaysia on 3 January 2023)

==== Oldest goal scorer ====
- Aleksandar Đurić – 42 years 3 months 7 day old (for Singapore vs Malaysia on 25 November 2012)

=== Coach records ===
==== Most successful coach ====
- (Serbia) Radojko Avramović – 3 titles (managing Singapore, 2004, 2007 and 2012)

=== Other statistics ===
- Indonesia (2004), Thailand (2008 and 2026), and Vietnam (2000, 2018, 2020, and 2022) did not concede a single goal in their group stage campaigns in the indicated years.
- The 2002 AFF Championship final is still the only final to have been settled on penalties.

== See also ==
- Football at the Southeast Asian Games
- AFF Women's Championship
- AFC Asian Cup
- CAFA Nations Cup
- EAFF E-1 Football Championship
- SAFF Championship
- WAFF Championship
