= Singapore national football team results (2000–2019) =

Football statistics

- Win Draw Loss

This article provides details of international football games played by the Singapore national football team from 2000 to 2019.

== Acronyms ==
Acronyms	Full Name
WC	FIFA World Cup
AFC	Asian Football Federation
AFF	ASEAN Football Federation
Q	Qualification rounds
PO	Play-off round
GS	Group stage
R32	Round of 32
R16	Round of 16
QF	Quarter-finals
SF	Semi-finals
3rd PO	Third place match/play-off
F	Final

== Results ==
=== 2000 ===
7 February 2000 Friendly	Singapore	3–1	Malaysia	Singapore
20:00 UTC+8	Nazri Nasir; Tan; Ahmad Latiff	Report	Mohd Nizaruddin Yusof	Stadium: National Stadium; Attendance: 35,000
Note: SingTel Challenge Cup

10 February 2000 Friendly	Hong Kong	0–0	Singapore	Hong Kong
20:00 UTC+8		Report		Stadium: Mong Kok Stadium; Attendance: 2,500

13 February 2000 2000 Asian Cup Q	Singapore	0-3	Japan	Macau
--:-- UTC+8		Report	Nakazawa 13', 90'; Nakayama 42' (pen.)	Stadium: Centro Desportivo Olímpico - Estádio; Attendance: 1,000; Referee: Kim Hoe Sung (South Korea)

16 February 2000 2000 Asian Cup Q	Macau	0–1	Singapore	Macau
--:-- UTC+8		Report	Zulkarnaen 12' (pen.)	Stadium: Centro Desportivo Olímpico - Estádio

20 February 2000 2000 Asian Cup Q	Singapore	1–0	Brunei	Macau
--:-- UTC+8	Mohd Ali 88'	Report		Stadium: Centro Desportivo Olímpico - Estádio

2 June 2000 Friendly	Singapore	1–5	Qatar	Singapore
--:-- UTC+8	Rafi Ali 75'		Adel Al-Mulla 53'; Adel Jadoua Ali 55'; Jassim Al-Tamimi 60'; Zamel Essa Al-Kuwari 84'; Yasser Nazmi 90+1' (pen.)

8 October 2000 Friendly	Hong Kong	1–0	Singapore	Hong Kong
--:-- UTC+8	Cheung 12' (pen.)	Report		Stadium: Hong Kong Stadium; Attendance: 3,370

28 October 2000 Friendly	Singapore	4–0	Sri Lanka	Singapore
--:-- UTC+8	Ahmad Latiff 11', 57'; Indra Sahdan 31'; Nazri Nasir 90+2'	Report		Stadium: Bishan Stadium

1 November 2000 Friendly	Singapore	1–0	Indonesia	Singapore
--:-- UTC+8	Nazri Nasir 79'	Report		Stadium: National Stadium

5 November 2000 2000 Tiger Cup	Singapore	1–0	Cambodia	Songkhla, Thailand
16:30 UTC+7	Rafi Ali 25'			Stadium: Tinsulanon Stadium; Referee: U Tun Hla Aung (Myanmar)

9 November 2000 2000 Tiger Cup	Singapore	3–0	Laos	Songkhla, Thailand
19:30 UTC+7	Rafi Ali 8'; Nazri Nasir 22'; Steven Tan Teng Chuan 90'			Stadium: Tinsulanon Stadium; Referee: U Tun Hla Aung (Myanmar)

11 November 2000 2000 Tiger Cup	Vietnam	1–0	Singapore	Songkhla, Thailand
19:30 UTC+7	Lê Huỳnh Đức 62'			Stadium: Tinsulanon Stadium; Referee: Hanlumyaung Panya (Thailand)

13 November 2000 2000 Tiger Cup	Malaysia	1–0	Singapore	Songkhla, Thailand
16:30 UTC+7	Azman Adnan 63'			Stadium: Tinsulanon Stadium; Referee: U Tun Hla Aung (Myanmar)

=== 2001 ===
27 January 2001 Friendly	Singapore	1–1 (5–3 p)	Thailand	Singapore
19:30 UTC+8	Zulkarnaen 90' (pen.)	Report	Suksomkit 71'	Stadium: National Stadium; Attendance: 35,000; Referee: Halim Abdul Hamid (Malaysia)
	Penalties
	Hafizat (penalty scored); Zulkarnaen (penalty scored); Hasrin (penalty scored); Fadzuhasny (penalty scored); Rafi Ali (penalty scored)		(penalty scored) Promrut; (penalty scored) Jaturapattarapong; (penalty missed) Baribarn; (penalty scored) Thonkanya
Note: Mikasa Challenge Cup

3 February 2001 2002 FIFA WCQ	Singapore	0–1	Kyrgyzstan	Singapore
20:30 UTC+8		Report	Kovalenko 83'	Stadium: National Stadium; Attendance: 25,000; Referee: Abdul Aziz A. Al Dokhail (Saudi Arabia)

6 February 2001 2002 FIFA WCQ	Singapore	1–1	Kuwait	Singapore
19:30 UTC+8	Alam Shah 86'	Report	Abdullah 61'	Stadium: National Stadium; Attendance: 12,000; Referee: Suresh Srinivasan (India)

9 February 2001 2002 FIFA WCQ	Singapore	1–2	Bahrain	Singapore
20:00 UTC+8	Ali 65'	Report	Al Sadi 15', 25'	Stadium: National Stadium; Attendance: 25,000; Referee: Kazuhiko Matsumura (Japan)

21 February 2001 2002 FIFA WCQ	Kuwait	1–0	Singapore	Kuwait City, Kuwait
19:00 UTC+3	Al-Mutairi 52'	Report		Stadium: Kuwait National Stadium; Attendance: 12,099; Referee: Toshimitsu Yoshida (Japan)

24 February 2001 2002 FIFA WCQ	Bahrain	2–0	Singapore	Kuwait City, Kuwait
19:00 UTC+3	Eid 40'; Al Sadi 43'	Report		Stadium: Kuwait National Stadium; Attendance: 800; Referee: Youssuf Al Aqily (Saudi Arabia)

27 February 2001 2002 FIFA WCQ	Kyrgyzstan	1–1	Singapore	Kuwait City, Kuwait
16:45 UTC+3	Kovalenko 77'	Report	Rafi Ali 60'	Stadium: Kuwait National Stadium; Attendance: 25,099; Referee: Mohammad Abdur Rakib (Bangladesh)

22 May 2001 Friendly	Singapore	3–0	New Zealand	Singapore
--:-- UTC+8	Indra Sahdan 6', 67'; Rafi Ali 60'	Report		Stadium: Bishan Stadium; Attendance: 5,400

10 July 2001 Friendly	Singapore	0–3	Saudi Arabia	Singapore
20:00 UTC+8		Report	Sami Al-Jaber 28', 37'; Obeid Al-Dosari 31'	Stadium: National Stadium; Attendance: 8,000; Referee: Rahman Vijay (Singapore)
Note: Lycos Challenge Cup

13 August 2001 Friendly	Singapore	0–5	Thailand	Singapore
18:00 UTC+8		Report	Senamuang 25', 70'; Piturat 43', 75'; Suksomkit 90'	Stadium: National Stadium; Attendance: 7,500; Referee: Kennedy Kumbalingham (Singapore)

=== 2002 ===
7 February 2002 Friendly	Singapore	2–1	North Korea	Kallang, Singapore
20:00 UTC+8	Nazri 47'; Azhar 55'	Report	So 88'	Stadium: National Stadium; Attendance: 6,000
Note: Tiger Beer International Series 2002 - NTUC Income Cup

10 February 2002 2002 King's Cup	Thailand	4–0	Singapore	Bangkok, Thailand
--:-- UTC+8	Anurak 19'; Seksan 75'; Pitipong 76'; Kwanchai 90'	Report		Stadium: Supachalasai Stadium

12 February 2002 2002 King's Cup	North Korea	4–2	Singapore	Bangkok, Thailand
--:-- UTC+8	Choe 20'; Ri 66', 80'; Kim 85'	Report	Faduhasnyl 1', 71'	Stadium: Supachalasai Stadium

14 February 2002 2002 King's Cup	Qatar	3–0	Singapore	Bangkok, Thailand
--:-- UTC+8	H. Yasser 48', 77'; M. Yasser 81'	Report		Stadium: Supachalasai Stadium

16 February 2002 2002 King's Cup	Qatar	2–0	Singapore	Bangkok, Thailand
--:-- UTC+8	Sayed Bechir 82'; Mustafa Mousa 90'	Report		Stadium: Supachalasai Stadium
Note: Third place match

9 April 2002 Friendly	Singapore	2–0	Maldives	Bishan, Singapore
20:00 UTC+8	Noor Ali 77'; Gonçalves 80'			Stadium: Bishan Stadium
Note: Tiger Beer International Series 2002 - Tiger Beer Challenge Trophy

21 May 2002 Friendly	Singapore	1–2	Uruguay	Kallang, Singapore
19:00 UTC+8	Indra Sahdan 82' (pen.)		Richard Morales 26', 76'	Stadium: National Stadium; Attendance: 23,834; Referee: Subkhiddin Mohd Salleh Malaysia
Note: Tiger Beer International Series 2002 - Tiger Beer Challenge Trophy

16 July 2002 Friendly	Malaysia	1–2	Singapore	Kuantan, Malaysia
	Mohd Khalid 35'		Zulkarnaen 89'; Nazri 90+5'	Stadium: Darul Makmur Stadium; Attendance: 30,000

10 November 2002 Friendly	Singapore	1–1 (4–3 p)	Indonesia	Kallang, Singapore
20:30 UTC+8	Fadzuhasny 38'		Imran 80'	Stadium: National Stadium
Note: Tiger Beer International Series 2002 - Tiger Beer Challenge Trophy

30 November 2002 Friendly	Jordan	3–1	Singapore	Abu Dhabi, UAE
	Mahmoud Shelbaieh 27'; Sama'an Halsa 25', 40'	Report	Rafi Ali 4'	Stadium: Sultan bin Zayed Stadium
Note: UAE Independence Tournament / Devotion for the President Tournament 2002 / United Arab Emirates tour

11 December 2002 Friendly	Singapore	2–0	Philippines	Kallang, Singapore
20:00 UTC+8	Gonçalves 72'; Indra Sahdan 90'	Report		Stadium: National Stadium

18 December 2002 2002 Tiger Cup	Singapore	0–4	Malaysia	Kallang, Singapore
20:05 UTC+8			Rizal 30'; Indra 49', 65'; Nizaruddin 69'	Stadium: National Stadium; Attendance: 45,000; Referee: Lee Young-chun (Korea Republic)

20 December 2002 2002 Tiger Cup	Singapore	2–1	Laos	Kallang, Singapore
20:05 UTC+8	Alam Shah 6'; Noor Ali 52'		Phaphouvanin 19'	Stadium: National Stadium; Referee: Midi Nitrorejo Setiyono (Indonesia)

22 December 2002 2002 Tiger Cup	Singapore	1–1	Thailand	Kallang, Singapore
19:35 UTC+8	Noor Ali 44'		Woorawoot 15'	Stadium: National Stadium; Attendance: 20,000; Referee: Jerry Andres (Philippines)

=== 2003 ===
4 March 2003 Friendly	Singapore	4–1	Maldives	Jalan Besar, Singapore
19:30 UTC+8	Azhar Baksin 8'; Indra Sahdan 17'; Syed Fadhil 22'; Fadzuhasny 67'	Report	Ali Umar 44'	Stadium: Jalan Besar Stadium

23 March 2003 2004 Asian Cup Q	Singapore	2–0	Macau	Jalan Besar, Singapore
19:30 UTC+8	Azhar Baksin 20'; Indra Sahdan 58'			Stadium: Jalan Besar Stadium; Attendance: 4,600
Note: Round 1

25 March 2003 2004 Asian Cup Q	Singapore	3–0	Pakistan	Jalan Besar, Singapore
19:30 UTC+8	Indra Sahdan 8', 35' (pen.); Alam Shah 66'	Report		Stadium: Jalan Besar Stadium; Attendance: 6,000; Referee: Hidayat Jajat Sudrajat Indonesia
Note: Round 1

4 August 2003 Friendly	Singapore	4–1	Hong Kong	Jalan Besar, Singapore
19:30 UTC+8	Bennett 7'; Fadzuhasny 16'; Indra Sahdan 67', 77'	Report	Au 46'	Stadium: Jalan Besar Stadium
Note: Tiger Beer International Series

4 September 2003 2004 Asian Cup Q	Singapore	1–3	Kuwait	Kallang, Singapore
19:30 UTC+8	Goncalves 50'		Neda 10'; Al-Mutawa 67', 90'	Stadium: National Stadium; Attendance: 10,500
Note: Round 2

16 September 2003 Friendly	Singapore	1–3	Oman	Bishan, Singapore
19:30 UTC+8	Indra Sahdan 66'	Report	Fawzi Bashir 31', 66'; Aide Iskandar 51' (o.g.)	Stadium: Bishan Stadium
Note: Tiger Beer International Series - NTUC Income Challenge Cup

27 September 2003 2004 Asian Cup Q	Kuwait	4–0	Singapore	Hawally, Kuwait
--:-- UTC+8	Abdullah 25', 78'; Al-Mutawa 47'; Abdulreda 53'			Stadium: Mohammed Al-Hamad Stadium
Note: Round 2

19 October 2003 2004 Asian Cup Q	Singapore	2–0	Palestine	Jalan Besar, Singapore
19:30 UTC+8	Fadzuhasny 18'; Alam Shah 88'			Stadium: Jalan Besar Stadium; Attendance: 2,787; Referee: Sarkar Subrata (India)
Note: Round 2

22 October 2003 2004 Asian Cup Q	Palestine	0–0	Singapore	Jalan Besar, Singapore
19:30 UTC+8				Stadium: Jalan Besar Stadium; Attendance: 3,076; Referee: Anura de Silva (Sri Lanka)
Note: Round 2

19 November 2003 2004 Asian Cup Q	Qatar	2–0	Singapore	Doha, Qatar
--:-- UTC+8	Bechir 10'; Mustafa 28'			Stadium: Al-Ittihad Club Stadium
Note: Round 2

29 November 2003 2004 Asian Cup Q	Singapore	0–2	Qatar	Jalan Besar, Singapore
16:30 UTC+8			Koni 42'; Bechir 55'	Stadium: Jalan Besar Stadium; Referee: Panya Hanlumyaung (Thailand)
Note: Round 2

=== 2004 ===
28 January 2004 Friendly	Singapore	2–5	Norway	Kallang, Singapore
19:30 UTC+8	Bennett 45'; Shahril 52'		Stadheim 18'; Aas 42'; Flo 59', 70'; Brattbakk 67'	Stadium: National Stadium; Attendance: 5,000; Referee: Ahmad Khalidi Supian (Malaysia)
Note: Tiger Bear Challenge Trophy

18 February 2004 2006 FIFA WCQ	India	1–0	Singapore	Margao, India
16:00 UTC+5:30	Renedy 50'	Report		Stadium: Fatorda Stadium; Attendance: 28,000; Referee: Farajollah Yasrebi (Iran)
Note: Second Round

31 March 2004 2006 FIFA WCQ	Singapore	1-2	Japan	Jalan Besar, Singapore
20:00 UTC+8	Sahdan 62'	Report	Takahara 33'; Fujita 81'	Stadium: Jalan Besar Stadium; Attendance: 6,000; Referee: Bae Jae-yong (Korea Republic)
Note: Second Round

9 June 2004 2006 FIFA WCQ	Oman	7-0	Singapore	Muscat, Oman
19:45 UTC+4	Al-Maimani 9', 44', 64', 86'; Ayil 25', 53'; Al-Mukhaini 39'	Report		Stadium: Sultan Qaboos Sports Complex; Attendance: 2,000; Referee: Abdulhameed Ebrahim (Bahrain)
Note: Second Round

12 July 2004 Friendly	Malaysia	2-0	Singapore	Kuala Lumpur, Malaysia
20:45 UTC+8	Mohd Shukor Adan 65'; Akmal Rizal 90'		Tan Kim Leng (red card) 42'	Stadium: Kuala Lumpur Stadium; Referee: Waiyabot Anucha {Thailand}

4 September 2004 Friendly	Singapore	2-0	Indonesia	Jalan Besar, Singapore
19:00 UTC+8	Alam Shah 39'; Indra Sahdan 49'			Stadium: Jalan Besar Stadium; Attendance: 3,030; Player of the Match: Itimi Dickson

8 September 2004 2006 FIFA WCQ	Singapore	0-2	Oman	Jalan Besar, Singapore
19:30 UTC+8		Report	Shaaban 3'; Ali 82'	Stadium: Jalan Besar Stadium; Attendance: 4,00; Referee: Deshapryia Arambekade (Sri Lanka)
Note: Second Round

8 October 2004 Friendly	Singapore	1-2	United Arab Emirates	Jalan Besar, Singapore
19:30 UTC+8	Masrezwan 55'		Fahed Masoud 24'; Salem Khamis 25'	Stadium: Jalan Besar Stadium
Note: Tiger Beer International Series

13 October 2004 2006 FIFA WCQ	Singapore	2-0	India	Jalan Besar, Singapore
19:30 UTC+8	Indra Sahdan 73'; Khairul 76'	Report		Stadium: Jalan Besar Stadium; Attendance: 3,609; Referee: Yousuf Husain (Bahrain)
Note: Second Round

1 November 2004 Friendly	Singapore	1-2	Malaysia	Jalan Besar, Singapore
20:30 UTC+8	Dickson 21'		Khalid 68'; Mohd Amri 90'	Stadium: Jalan Besar Stadium; Attendance: 3,293
Note: Tiger Bear Challenge Trophy

17 November 2004 2006 FIFA WCQ	Japan	1-0	Singapore	Saitama, Japan
19:20 UTC+9	Tamada 13'	Report		Stadium: Saitama Stadium, Attendance: 58,881; Referee: Mohsen Torky (Iran)

27 November 2004 Friendly	Singapore	1-0	Myanmar	Jalan Besar, Singapore
19:30 UTC+8	Noh Alam Shah 78'	Report		Stadium: Jalan Besar Stadium
Note: Tiger International Football Festival

30 November 2004 Friendly	Singapore	0-0 (5-6 p)	Hong Kong	Jalan Besar, Singapore
19:30 UTC+8				Stadium: Jalan Besar Stadium
	Penalties
	Khairul (penalty missed)		Penalty scored
Note: Tiger International Football Festival

7 December 2004 2004 Tiger Cup GS	Vietnam	1–1	Singapore	Ho Chi Minh City, Vietnam
19:30 UTC+7	Thạch Bảo Khanh 51'		Indra 70'	Stadium: Thống Nhất Stadium; Referee: Sun Baojie (China)

9 December 2004 2004 Tiger Cup GS	Indonesia	0-0	Singapore	Ho Chi Minh City, Vietnam
19:30 UTC+8				Stadium: Thống Nhất Stadium; Referee: Kwon Jong-Chul (Korea Republic)

13 December 2004 2004 Tiger Cup GS	Singapore	6-2	Laos	Hanoi, Vietnam
17:00 UTC+8	Hasrin 7'; Indra 19', 74'; Thongphachan 39' (o.g.); Casmir 45', 90+2' (pen.)		Phaphouvanin 22'; Luang-Amath 72' (pen.)	Stadium: Mỹ Đình National Stadium; Referee: Ahmad Khalidi Supian (Malaysia)

15 December 2004 2004 Tiger Cup GS	Cambodia	0-3	Singapore	Hai Phong, Vietnam
18:00 UTC+8			Dickson 20'; Baihakki 26'; Khairul 54'	Stadium: Lạch Tray Stadium; Referee: Abdulhameed Ebrahim (Bahrain)

29 December 2004 2004 Tiger Cup SF	Myanmar	3-4	Singapore	Kuala Lumpur, Malaysia
--:-- UTC+8	S. M. Min 34', 90'; M. Thu 36'		Bennett 20'; Casmir 38'; Alam Shah 63'; Shahril 81'	Stadium: KLFA Stadium; Referee: Rungklay Mongkol (Thailand)
Note: Semi-finals (first leg)

=== 2005 ===
2 January 2005 2004 Tiger Cup SF	Singapore	4–2 (a.e.t.) (8-5 agg.)	Myanmar	Kallang, Singapore
19:30 UTC+8	Z. L. Tun 74' (o.g.); Alam Shah 94', 96'; Casmir 108'	Report	S. M. Min 15'; A. K. Moe 50'	Stadium: National Stadium; Referee: Toru Kamikawa (Japan)

8 January 2005 2004 Tiger Cup F	Indonesia	1–3	Singapore	Jakarta, Indonesia
19:45 UTC+7	Mahyadi 90'		Bennett 3'; Khairul 39'; Casmir 69'	Stadium: Gelora Bung Karno Stadium; Attendance: 80,000; Referee: Kwon Jong-Chul (Korea Republic)

16 January 2005 2004 Tiger Cup F	Singapore	2–1 (5-2 agg.)	Indonesia	Kallang, Singapore
19:45 UTC+8	Indra 6'; Casmir 41' (pen.)		Elie 77'	Stadium: National Stadium; Attendance: 55,000; Referee: Khalil Al Ghamdi (Saudi Arabia)

4 June 2005 Friendly	Singapore	2–0	Malaysia	Kallang, Singapore
20:00 UTC+8	Noh Alam Shah 32', 90'	Report		Stadium: National Stadium
Note: Tiger Beer Causeway Challenge 2005

8 June 2005 Friendly	Malaysia	1–2	Singapore	Penang, Malaysia
20:45 UTC+8	Arsyah 25'	Report	Alam Shah 18'; Bennett 66'	Stadium: City Stadium
Note: FAM Challenge Cup

11 October 2005 Friendly	Cambodia	0–2	Singapore	Phnom Penh, Cambodia
15:30 UTC+7			Shahril 44', 80'	Stadium: Olympic Stadium

=== 2006 ===
3 February 2006 Friendly	Kuwait	2–2	Singapore	Kuwait City, Kuwait
	Al-Mutawa 30'; Jarragh 8'	Report	Khairul 73'; Indra Sahdan 90'	Stadium: Al Kuwait Sports Club Stadium

6 February 2006 Friendly	Oman	1–0	Singapore
23:00 UTC+8	Hashim Saleh 89'	Report

15 February 2006 Friendly	Hong Kong	1–1	Singapore	So Kon Po, Hong Kong
19:30 UTC+8	Gerard 65'	Report	Alam Shah 66' (pen.)	Stadium: Hong Kong Stadium; Attendance: 610

22 February 2006 2007 Asian Cup Q	Singapore	2–0	Iraq	Kallang, Singapore
19:30 UTC+8	Khairul 24'; Noh Alam 83'	Report		Stadium: Singapore National Stadium; Attendance: 10,221; Referee: Mark Shield (Australia)

1 March 2006 2007 Asian Cup Q	Palestine	1–0	Singapore	Amman, Jordan
16:00 UTC+3 16:00	Attal 75'	Report		Stadium: King Abdullah Stadium; Attendance: 1,000; Referee: Abdullah Al Hilali (Oman)

31 May 2006 Friendly	Singapore	0–0 (5-4 p)	Malaysia	Kallang, Singapore
		Report		Stadium: Singapore National Stadium; Player of the Match: Ahmad Latiff
Note: Tiger FC Causeway Challenge

3 June 2006 Friendly	Malaysia	0–0 (7-8 p)	Singapore	Negri Sembilan, Malaysia
20:00 UTC+8				Stadium: Tuanku Abdul Rahman Stadium; Attendance: 25,000
Note: Tiger FC Causeway Challenge

12 August 2006 Friendly	Hong Kong	1–2	Singapore	So Kon Po, Hong Kong
18:00 UTC+8	Lee 68'		Alam Shah 19'; Dickson 76'	Stadium: Hong Kong Stadium

16 August 2006 2007 Asian Cup Q	China	1–0	Singapore	Tianjin, China
20:00 UTC+8	Shao Jiayi 90+5' (pen.)	Report		Stadium: TEDA Football Stadium; Attendance: 27,000; Referee: Abdulhameed Ebrahim (Bahrain)

6 September 2006 2007 Asian Cup Q	Singapore	0–0	China	Kallang, Singapore
19:30 UTC+8		Report		Stadium: Singapore National Stadium; Attendance: 39,000; Referee: T.H. Shamsuzzaman (Bangladesh)

11 October 2006 2007 Asian Cup Q	Iraq	4–2	Singapore	Al Ayn, United Arab Emirates
21:30 UTC+4	Mahmoud 35', 68'; Karim 60'; Mulla Mohammed 90+3'	Report	Goncalves 9'; Amri 62'	Stadium: Khalifa Bin Zayed Stadium; Attendance: 3,000; Referee: Mamed Mamedov (Turkmenistan)

11 November 2006 Friendly	Singapore	1–2	Indonesia	Kallang, Singapore
19:30 UTC+8	Shahril 63'	Report	Sinaga 49'; Zaenal 78'	Stadium: Singapore National Stadium

24 December 2006 2006 King's Cup	Kazakhstan	0–0	Singapore	Bangkok, Thailand
17:00 UTC+7				Stadium: Suphachalasai Stadium

26 December 2006 2006 King's Cup	Thailand	2–0	Singapore	Bangkok, Thailand
18:45 UTC+7	Senamuang 58', 63'			Stadium: Suphachalasai Stadium

28 December 2006 2006 King's Cup	Vietnam	3–2	Singapore	Bangkok, Thailand
16:30 UTC+7	Phan Thanh Binh 7'; Le Tan Tai 53'; Le Cong Vinh 82'		Bennett 14'; Fazrul 62'	Stadium: Suphachalasai Stadium

=== 2007 ===
7 January 2007 Friendly	Singapore	4–1	Philippines	Choa Chu Kang, Singapore
--:-- UTC+8	Bennett 12'; Khairul 29'; Indra Sahdan 59', 71'		Younghusband 19'	Stadium: Choa Chu Kang Stadium

13 January 2007 2007 AFF GS	Singapore	0–0	Vietnam	Kallang, Singapore
20:00 UTC+8		Report		Stadium: National Stadium; Attendance: 20,000; Referee: Chanwalit Sananwai (Thailand)

15 January 2007 2007 AFF GS	Singapore	11–0	Laos	Kallang, Singapore
20:00 UTC+8	Ridhuan 10'; Alam Shah 11', 24', 61', 72', 76', 88', 90+2'; Shahril 47'; Khairul 71'; Dickson 78'	Report		Stadium: National Stadium; Attendance: 5,224; Referee: U Hla Tint (Myanmar)

17 January 2007 2007 AFF GS	Singapore	2–2	Indonesia	Kallang, Singapore
20:00 UTC+8	Alam Shah 10' (pen.); Sahdan 52'	Report	Ilham 27'; Zaenal 56'	Stadium: National Stadium; Attendance: 13,819; Referee: Chanwalit Sananwai (Thailand)

23 January 2007 2007 AFF SF 1st leg	Malaysia	1–1	Singapore	Selangor, Malaysia
20:00 UTC+8	Hardi 57'	Report	Alam Shah 73'	Stadium: Shah Alam Stadium; Attendance: 40,000; Referee: Wan Daxue (China PR)

27 January 2007 2007 AFF SF 2nd leg	Singapore	1–1 (a.e.t.) (5–4 p)	Malaysia	Kallang, Singapore
20:00 UTC+8	Ridhuan 74'	Report	Eddy 57'	Stadium: National Stadium; Attendance: 55,000; Referee: Cheung Yim Yau (Hong Kong)
	Penalties
	Sahdan (penalty scored); Alam Shah (penalty scored); Mustafić (penalty scored); Fazrul (penalty scored); Shi J.Y. (penalty scored)		(penalty scored) Hardi; (penalty scored) Rezal; (penalty scored) Samransak; (penalty scored) Thirumurgan; (penalty missed) Khyril
Note: 2–2 on aggregate. Singapore won via a penalty shootout.

31 January 2007 2007 AFF F 1st leg	Singapore	2–1	Thailand	Kallang, Singapore
20:00 UTC+8	Alam Shah 17'; Mustafić 83' (pen.)	Report	Pipat 50'	Stadium: National Stadium; Attendance: 55,000; Referee: C. Ravichandran (Malaysia)

4 February 2007 2007 AFF F 2nd leg	Thailand	1–1 (2-3 agg.)	Singapore	Bangkok, Singapore
19:00 UTC+7	Pipat 37'	Report	Khairul 81'	Stadium: Suphachalasai Stadium; Attendance: 40,000; Referee: Jimmy Napitupulu (Indonesia)
Note: Singapore won 3–2 on aggregate.

24 June 2007 Friendly	Singapore	2–1	North Korea	Kallang, Singapore
20:30 UTC+8	Muhd Ridhuan 40'; Indra Sahdan 74'	Report	An Chol Hyok 59'	Stadium: National Stadium
Note: Singapore Invitational Tournament 2007

27 June 2007 Friendly	Singapore	1–2	Saudi Arabia	Kallang, Singapore
20:00 UTC+8	Ashrin Shariff 34'	Report	Abdulrahman 26'; Taisir 34'; Taisir (red card) 50'	Stadium: National Stadium; Attendance: 4,000
Note: Singapore Invitational Tournament 2007

30 June 2007 Friendly	Singapore	0–3	Australia	Kallang, Singapore
19:30 UTC+8			Viduka 51', 87'; Kewell 75'	Stadium: National Stadium; Attendance: 45,000

12 September 2007 Friendly	Singapore	1–1	United Arab Emirates	Jurong West, Singapore
19:30 UTC+8	Wilkinson 39'	Report	Faisal Khalil 69'	Stadium: Jurong West Stadium

4 October 2007 Friendly	Bahrain	3–1	Singapore	Riffa, Bahrain
21:00 UTC+3	Okwunwanne 36', 59', 77'	Report	Fahrudin (penalty missed); Agu Casmir 90'	Stadium: Bahrain National Stadium

8 October 2007 2010 FIFA WCQ R1	Palestine	0-4	Singapore	Doha, Qatar
21:00 UTC+3		Report	Shi 44', 53'; Wilkinson 73'; Alam Shah 87'	Stadium: Al Rayyan Stadium; Attendance: 75; Referee: Mushen Basma (Syria)
Note: 2010 FIFA WCQ (AFC) - first round

8 October 2007 2010 FIFA WCQ R1	Singapore	3-0; Awarded (Note: Palestine failed to show up. Match was awarded 3–0 to Singapore as a walkover.)	Palestine	Kallang, Singapore
21:00 UTC+3		Report		Stadium: National Stadium; Referee: Sun Baojie (China)
Note: 2010 FIFA WCQ (AFC) - first round. Singapore won 7–0 on aggregate.

9 November 2007 2010 FIFA WCQ R2	Singapore	2–0	Tajikistan	Kallang, Singapore
19:30 UTC+8	Đurić 23', 44'	Report		Stadium: National Stadium; Attendance: 6,606; Referee: Kwon Jong Chul (South Korea)
Note: 2010 FIFA WCQ (AFC) - second round

18 November 2007 2010 FIFA WCQ R2	Tajikistan	1–1	Singapore	Dushanbe, Tajikistan
13:00 UTC+5	Ismailov 2'	Report	Alam Shah 25'	Stadium: Central Stadium; Attendance: 21,500; Referee: Mark Shield (Australia)
Note: 2010 FIFA WCQ (AFC) - second round. Singapore won 3–1 on aggregate.

=== 2008 ===
24 January 2008 Friendly	Singapore	2–0	Kuwait	Muscat, Oman
	Đurić; Mustafić 61'	Report		Stadium: Sultan Qaboos Sports Complex

27 January 2008 Friendly	Oman	2–0	Singapore	Muscat, Oman
	Al-Hosni 7'; Al-Gheilani 9' (pen.)	Report		Stadium: Sultan Qaboos Sports Complex

31 January 2008 Friendly	Jordan	2–1	Singapore	Zarqa, Jordan
20:10 UTC+3	Al-Bzoor 32'; Deeb 90'	Report	Mustafić 76' (pen.)	Stadium: Prince Mohammed Stadium

6 February 2008 2010 FIFA WCQ	Saudi Arabia	2–0	Singapore	Riyadh, Saudi Arabia
16:00 UTC+8	Al-Qahtani 38'; Mouath 81'	Report		Stadium: King Fahd International Stadium; Attendance: 10,000; Referee: Muhsen Basma (Syria)

22 March 2008 Friendly	Singapore	0–0	Australia	Kallang, Singapore
		Report		Stadium: National Stadium; Attendance: 6,282; Referee: Veerapool Prayoon (Thailand)

26 March 2008 2010 FIFA WCQ	Singapore	2–0	Lebanon	Kallang, Singapore
19:30 UTC+8	Đurić 8'; Fazrul 24'	Report		Stadium: National Stadium; Attendance: 10,118; Referee: Hiroyoshi Takayama (Japan)

28 May 2008 Friendly	Singapore	0–1	Bahrain	Kallang, Singapore
19:30 UTC+8		Report	Al-Anezi 82'	Stadium: National Stadium

2 June 2008 2010 FIFA WCQ	Singapore	3–7	Uzbekistan	Kallang, Singapore
19:30 UTC+8	Đurić 16'; Mustafić 31' (pen.); Wilkinson 73'	Report	Kapadze 10'; Karpenko 22'; Djeparov 34', 44'; Denisov 42'; Ibrahimov 62'; Shatskikh 88'	Stadium: National Stadium; Attendance: 28,750; Referee: Ali Hamad Al-Badwawi (UAE)

7 June 2008 2010 FIFA WCQ	Uzbekistan	3–0; Awarded (Note: FIFA awarded Uzbekistan a 3–0 win as a result of Singapore fielding the ineligible player Qiu Li. The match originally ended 1–0 to Uzbekistan.)	Singapore	Tashkent, Uzbekistan
19:00 UTC+5	Geynrikh 80'	Report		Stadium: MHSK Stadium; Attendance: 12,867; Referee: Kim Dong-Jin (South Korea)
Note: FT score 1-0.

14 June 2008 2010 FIFA WCQ	Singapore	0–3; Awarded (Note: FIFA awarded Saudi Arabia a 3–0 win as a result of Singapore fielding ineligible player Qiu Li. The match originally ended 2–0 to Saudi Arabia.)	Saudi Arabia	Kallang, Singapore
19:30 UTC+8			Ab. Otaif 37'; Al-Fraidi 76'	Stadium: National Stadium; Attendance: 23,000; Referee: Ben Williams (Australia)
Note: FT score 0-2.

22 June 2008 2010 FIFA WCQ	Lebanon	1–2	Singapore	Beirut, Lebanon
	Baihakki 62' (o.g.)	Report	Dayoub 72' (o.g.); Wilkinson 73'	Stadium: Camille Chamoun Sports City Stadium; Attendance: 500; Referee: Masoud Moradi (Iran)

14 October 2008 Friendly	Vietnam	0–0	Singapore	Hanoi, Vietnam
		Report		Stadium: Mỹ Đình National Stadium

26 November 2008 Friendly	Singapore	2–2 (7-6 p)	Vietnam	Jurong East, Singapore
19:30 UTC+8	Wilkinson 39'; Casmir 79'	Report	Lê 42' (pen.); Phan 90'	Stadium: Jurong East Stadium
Note: Tiger Beer Challenge Cup 2008

29 November 2008 Friendly	Malaysia	2–2	Singapore	Petaling Jaya, Malaysia
18:00 UTC+8	Amirulhadi 22'; Hardi 74'	Report	Đurić 10', 45+1'	Stadium: MPPJ Stadium

5 December 2008 2008 AFF GS	Singapore	5–0	Cambodia	Jakarta, Indonesia
17:00 UTC+9	Casmir 44', 73'; Mustafić 61' (pen.); Sahdan 71'; Alam Shah 89'	Report		Stadium: Gelora Bung Karno Stadium; Attendance: 18,000; Referee: Chaiya Mahapab (Thailand)

7 December 2008 2008 AFF GS	Singapore	3–1	Myanmar	Jakarta, Indonesia
17:00 UTC+9	Alam Shah 1'; Casmir 16', 74'	Report	Myo Min Tun 28'	Stadium: Gelora Bung Karno Stadium; Attendance: 21,000; Referee: Phùng Đình Dũng (Vietnam)

9 December 2008 2008 AFF GS	Indonesia	0–2	Singapore	Jakarta, Indonesia
19:30 UTC+9		Report	Baihakki 3'; Shi Jiayi 50'	Stadium: Gelora Bung Karno Stadium; Attendance: 50,000; Referee: Ramachandran Krishnan (Malaysia)

17 December 2008 2008 AFF SF 1st leg	Vietnam	0–0	Singapore	Hanoi, Vietnam
19:00 UTC+7		Report		Stadium: Mỹ Đình National Stadium; Attendance: 40,000; Referee: Ramachandran Krishnan (Malaysia)

21 December 2008 2008 AFF SF 2nd leg	Singapore	0–1 (0-1 agg.)	Vietnam	Kallang, Singapore
20:00 UTC+8		Report	Nguyễn Quang Hải 74'	Stadium: National Stadium; Attendance: 55,000; Referee: Subkhiddin Mohd Salleh (Malaysia)

=== 2009 ===
14 January 2009 Asian Cup qualifier	Iran	6–0	Singapore

28 January 2009 Asian Cup qualifier	Singapore	2–1	Jordan

12 August 2009 Friendly	Singapore	1–1	China

22 October 2009	Singapore	4–2	Turkmenistan

24 October 2009	Vietnam	2–2	Singapore

4 November 2009 Friendly	Singapore	3–1	Indonesia

14 November 2009 Asian Cup qualifier	Singapore	1–3	Thailand

18 November 2009 Asian Cup qualifier	Thailand	0–1	Singapore

28 December 2009 Friendly	Singapore	0–0	Oman

31 December 2009 Friendly	Singapore	1–4	Oman

=== 2010 ===
6 January 2010 Asian Cup 2015 Q	Singapore	1–3	Iran	Singapore
19:30 UTC+8	Alam Shah 32'		Aghili 11' (pen.); Madanchi 12'; Rezaei 63'	Stadium: National Stadium; Attendance: 7,356; Referee: Sun Baojie (China)

17 January 2010 2010 King's Cup	Thailand	1–0	Singapore	Nakhon Ratchasima, Thailand
18:30 UTC+7	Sutee 60'			Stadium: 80th Birthday Stadium

20 January 2010 2010 King's Cup	Singapore	1–5	Denmark	Nakhon Ratchasima, Thailand
16:00 UTC+7	Nawaz 84'		Larsen 8'; Poulsen 19' (pen.); Lekic 35'; Thygesen 48'; Rieks 80'	Stadium: 80th Birthday Stadium

23 January 2010 2010 King's Cup	Poland	6–1	Singapore	Nakhon Ratchasima, Thailand
16:00 UTC+7	Lewandowski 26' (pen.), 37'; Iwański 45' (pen.); Brożek 69'; Małecki 80'; Nowak 88' (pen.)		Jiayi 39'	Stadium: 80th Birthday Stadium

3 March 2010 Asian Cup 2015 Q	Jordan	2–1	Singapore	Amman, Jordan
18:00 UTC+2:00	Al-Saify 9'; Anas 60' 32'		Alam Shah 48'	Stadium: King Abdullah Stadium, Amman; Attendance: 17,000; Referee: Abdul-Rahman Mohammad (Qatar)

11 August 2010 Friendly	Thailand	1–0	Singapore	Yamaha Stadium, Nonthaburi Province
	Sarayoot 28'			Referee: Apisit Aonrak

2 November 2010 2010 VFF Cup	North Korea	2–1	Singapore	Hanoi, Vietnam
	Ri Myong-Jun 81'; An Il-Bom 90'	Report	Aleksandar Duric 41'	Stadium: Mỹ Đình National Stadium

4 November 2010 2010 VFF Cup	Vietnam	1–1	Singapore	Hanoi, Vietnam
	Phan Van Tai Em 76'	Report	Shi Jiayi 24'	Stadium: Mỹ Đình National Stadium

6 November 2010 2010 VFF Cup	Singapore	2–0	South Korea U-23	Hanoi, Vietnam
	Aleksandar Duric 44', 58'	Report		Stadium: Mỹ Đình National Stadium

26 November 2010 Friendly	Singapore	4–0	Laos	Singapore

2 December 2010 2010 AFF Championship	Singapore	1–1	Philippines	Hanoi, Vietnam
17:00	Đurić 65'		C. Greatwich 90+3'	Stadium: Mỹ Đình National Stadium, Hanoi; Referee: Chaiya Mahapab (Thailand)

5 December 2010 2010 AFF Championship	Singapore	2–1	Myanmar	Hanoi, Vietnam
17:00	Đurić 62'; Casmir 90+4'		Khin Maung Lwin 13'	Stadium: Mỹ Đình National Stadium, Hanoi; Referee: Tao Rancheng (China PR)

8 December 2010 2010 AFF Championship	Vietnam	1–0	Singapore	Hanoi, Vietnam
19:30	Nguyễn Vũ Phong 32'			Stadium: Mỹ Đình National Stadium, Hanoi; Attendance: 40,000; Referee: Chaiya Mahapab (Thailand)

=== 2011 ===
7 June 2011 Friendly	Singapore	4–0	Maldives	Singapore
19:30 UTC+4:00	Qiu Li 13' (pen.), 19'; Jiayi 30'; Durić 49'			Stadium: Jalan Besar Stadium; Attendance: 2,166

18 July 2011 Friendly	Singapore	3–2	Chinese Taipei	Singapore
19:30 UTC+4:00	Durić 17', 54'; Fazrul 83'	Report	Lo Chih An 45'; Chiang Shih-lu 62'	Stadium: Jalan Besar Stadium; Attendance: 1,900

23 July 2011 2014 WCQ	Singapore	5–3	Malaysia	Singapore
19:30 UTC+4:00	Durić 8'; Qiu Li 22'; Mustafić 44'; Jiayi 45'; Durić 81'	Report	Safee Sali 1'; Abdul Hadi Yahya 70'; Safee Sali 71'	Stadium: Jalan Besar Stadium; Attendance: 6,000; Referee: Nawaf Shukralla (Bahrain)
Note: Second round

28 July 2011 2014 WCQ	Malaysia	1–1 (6-4 agg.)	Singapore	Kuala Lumpur, Malaysia
20:40 UTC+4:00	Jiayi 72'	Report	Safee Sali 54'	Stadium: Bukit Jalil National Stadium; Attendance: 87,000; Referee: Hiroyoshi Takayama (Japan)
Note: Second round

2 September 2011 2014 WCQ	China	2–1	Singapore	Kunming, China
20:00 UTC+8	Zheng Zhi 69' (pen.); Yu Hai 73'	Report	Đurić 33'	Stadium: Tuodong Stadium; Attendance: 17,000; Referee: Andre El Haddad (Lebanon)
Note: Third round

6 September 2011 2014 WCQ	Singapore	0–2	Iraq	Singapore
19:30 UTC+8		Report	Abdul-Zahra 50'; Mahmoud 86'	Stadium: Jalan Besar Stadium; Attendance: 5,505; Referee: Minoru Tōjō (Japan)
Note: Third round

7 October 2011 Friendly	Singapore	2–0	Philippines	Singapore
19:30 UTC+8:00	Shaiful 51'; Durić 65'			Stadium: Jalan Besar Stadium; Attendance: 5,516; Referee: Shukri Suhaizi (Malaysia)

11 October 2011 2014 WCQ	Singapore	0–3	Jordan	Singapore
19:30 UTC+8		Report	Abdallah Deeb 11'; Bani Yaseen 54'; Hayel 64'	Stadium: Jalan Besar Stadium; Attendance: 3,799; Referee: Choi Myung-Yong (Korea Republic)
Note: Third round

11 November 2011 2014 WCQ	Jordan	2–0	Singapore	Amman, Jordan
18:00 UTC+2	Hayel 15'; Amer Deeb 65'	Report		Stadium: Amman International Stadium; Attendance: 19,000; Referee: Benjamin Williams (Australia)
Note: Third round

15 November 2011 2014 WCQ	Singapore	0–4	China	Singapore
19:30 UTC+8		Report	Yu Hai 41'; Li Weifeng 56'; Zheng Zheng 73', 81'	Stadium: Jalan Besar Stadium; Attendance: 5,474; Referee: Abdullah Balideh (Qatar)
Note: Third round

=== 2012 ===
24 February 2012 Friendly	Azerbaijan	2–2	Singapore	Dubai, United Arab Emirates
16:30 UTC+4:00	Rauf Aliyev 15'; Shukurov 62'		Shahril 72' (pen.); Mustafić 90+3'	Stadium: The Sevens (stadium); Attendance: 100; Referee: Fahad Al Kassar Banihammad (United Arab Emirates)

29 February 2012 World Cup 2014 Q	Iraq	7–1	Singapore	Doha, Qatar
16:45 UTC+3	Jassim 5'; Mahmoud 11', 61', 90+3'; H. W. Mohammed 22' (pen.); Akram 36' (pen.); Karim 48'	Report	Isa 27'	Stadium: Grand Hamad Stadium, Doha (Qatar); Attendance: 950; Referee: Abdullah Al Hilali (Oman)

1 June 2012 Friendly	Hong Kong	1–0	Singapore	Hong Kong
20:00 UTC+8	Lam Ka Wai 36'			Stadium: Hong Kong Stadium; Attendance: 4285

8 June 2012 Friendly	Singapore	2–2	Malaysia	Singapore
19:30 UTC+8				Stadium: Jalan Besar Stadium

12 June 2012 Friendly	Malaysia	2–0	Singapore	Shah Alam, Malaysia
20:45 UTC+8				Stadium: Shah Alam Stadium

15 August 2012 Friendly	Singapore	2–0	Hong Kong	Singapore
19:30 UTC+8	Đurić 7', 21'			Stadium: Jurong West Stadium; Attendance: 837

11 September 2012 Friendly	Myanmar	1–1	Singapore	Yangon, Myanmar
18:00 UTC+6:30				Stadium: Thuwunna YTC Stadium

16 October 2012 Friendly	Singapore	2–0	India	Singapore
19:30 UTC+8	Amri 42'; Fazrul 49'			Stadium: Choa Chu Kang Stadium

15 November 2012 Friendly	Philippines	1–0	Singapore	Cebu, Philippines
	Angeles 54'			Stadium: Cebu City Sports Center

19 November 2012 Friendly	Singapore	4–0	Pakistan	Singapore
19:30 UTC+8	Jiayi 2'; Amri 45'; Shahril 64'; Đurić 88'			Stadium: Jurong West Stadium

25 November 2012 2012 Suzuki Cup	Malaysia	0–3	Singapore	Kuala Lumpur, Malaysia
20:45 UTC+8			Shahril 32', 38'; Đurić 75'	Stadium: Bukit Jalil National Stadium, Referee: Valentin Kovalenko (Uzbekistan)

28 November 2012 2012 Suzuki Cup	Indonesia	1–0	Singapore	Kuala Lumpur, Malaysia
18:00 UTC+8	Andik 88'			Stadium: Bukit Jalil National Stadium, Referee: Ali Abdulnabi (Bahrain)

1 December 2012 2012 Suzuki Cup	Singapore	4–3	Laos	Shah Alam, Malaysia
20:45 UTC+8	Shahril 45+1', 52'; Amri 63'; Fazrul 65'		Sayavutthi 21', 81' (pen.); Liththideth 40'	Stadium: Shah Alam Stadium, Referee: Ng Kai Lam (Hong Kong)

8 December 2012 2012 Suzuki Cup	Philippines	0–0	Singapore	Manila, Philippines
20:00 UTC+8				Stadium: Rizal Memorial Stadium, Referee: Ng Kai Lam (Hong Kong)

12 December 2012 2012 Suzuki Cup	Singapore	1–0	Philippines	Singapore
20:00 UTC+8	Amri 19'			Stadium: Jalan Besar Stadium, Attendance: 8000; Referee: Tan Hai (China)

19 December 2012 2012 Suzuki Cup	Singapore	3–1	Thailand	Singapore
20:00 UTC+8	Mustafić 10' (pen.); Amri 19'; Baihakki 90+1'		Adul 65'	Stadium: Jalan Besar Stadium, Attendance: 8000; Referee: Masaaki Toma (Japan)

22 December 2012 2012 Suzuki Cup	Thailand	1–0	Singapore	Bangkok, Thailand
19:00 UTC+7	Kirati 45'			Stadium: Supachalasai Stadium, Referee: Ravshan Irmatov (Uzbekistan)

=== 2013 ===
6 February 2013 Asian Cup 2015 Q	Jordan	4–0	Singapore	Amman, Jordan
17:00 UTC+3	Abdallah Deeb 18'; Bani Attiah 52'; Hayel 55', 74'	Report		Stadium: King Abdullah Stadium; Attendance: 2,004; Referee: Valentin Kovalenko (Uzbekistan)

4 June 2013 Friendly	Myanmar	0–2	Singapore	Yangon, Myanmar
19:30 UTC+6:30			Amri 61'; Shaiful 11'	Stadium: Thuwunna Stadium; Attendance: 5,000

7 June 2013 Friendly	Laos	2–5	Singapore	Vientiane, Laos
18:00 UTC+7	Ketsada 48'; Khonesavanh 62'		Indra 7'; Hariss 27'; Safuwan 41'; Gabriel 84'; Hafiz 88'	Stadium: New Laos National Stadium; Referee: Sivakorn Pu-udom (Thailand)

14 August 2013 Asian Cup 2015 Q	Singapore	0–2	Oman	Singapore
19:30 UTC+8		Report	Said 15'; Al-Farsi 45'	Stadium: Jalan Besar Stadium; Attendance: 5,849; Referee: Masaaki Toma (Japan)

6 September 2013 Friendly	China	6–1	Singapore	Tianjin, China
19:46 UTC+8			Shahfiq 17'	Stadium: TEDA Soccer Stadium

10 September 2013 Friendly	Hong Kong	1–0	Singapore	Hong Kong
20:00 UTC+8				Stadium: Mong Kok Stadium

10 October 2013 Friendly	Singapore	1–0	Laos	Singapore
19:45 UTC+8	Amri 2'			Stadium: Jalan Besar Stadium

15 October 2013 Asian Cup 2015 Q	Singapore	2–1	Syria	Singapore
19:30 UTC+8	Amri 62'; Gabriel 82'	Report	Rafe 89'	Stadium: Jalan Besar Stadium; Attendance: 3,012; Referee: Kim Sang-Woo (South Korea)

15 November 2013 Asian Cup 2015 Q	Syria	4–0	Singapore	Tehran, Iran
14:00 UTC+3:30	Malki 10'; Al Douni 83'; Jafal 86'; Al Agha 90+1'	Report		Stadium: Shahid Dastgerdi Stadium; Attendance: 50; Referee: Minoru Tōjō (South Korea)

=== 2014 ===
4 February 2014 2015 Asian Cup Q	Singapore	1–3	Jordan	Singapore
19:30 UTC+8	Amri 84' (pen.)	Report	Bawab 44'; Hayel 58'; Al-Rawashdeh 90+2'	Stadium: Jalan Besar Stadium; Attendance: 2,371; Referee: Tan Hai (China)

5 March 2014 2015 Asian Cup Q	Oman	3–1	Singapore	Muscat, Oman
17:30 UTC+4	Al Hosni 19'; Said 51'; Al-Hasani 69'	Report	Shahril 78'	Stadium: Sultan Qaboos Sports Complex, Attendance: 6,700; Referee: Ko Hyung-Jin (South Korea)

2 June 2014 Friendly	France U21	6–0	Singapore	Saint-Pierre, Réunion island
21:00 UTC+4	Umtiti 21'; Ntep 23' 36'; Coman 44'; Thauvin 55'; Maupay 64'			Stadium: Stade Michel Volnay; Attendance: 8067; Referee: (Madagascar) Hamada Nampiandraza

5 August 2014 Friendly	Bahrain	2–3	Singapore	Manama, Bahrain
19:30 UTC+3	3' (pen.); (red card) 52'	Report	Sahil 14', 61'; Shahfiq 45'	Stadium: Al Ahli Stadium
Note: The Singapore team is eligible for Asian Games, however they consist of non-U23 players.

6 September 2014 Friendly	Singapore	2–1	Papua New Guinea	Singapore
19:30 UTC+8	Sahil 17'; Fazrul 23'	Report	Gunemba 61'	Stadium: Hougang Stadium

9 September 2014 Friendly	Singapore	0–0	Hong Kong	Singapore
19:30 UTC+8		Report		Stadium: Hougang Stadium

10 October 2014 Friendly	Hong Kong	2–1	Singapore	Hong Kong
20:00 UTC+8	Xu 7'; Ju 52'	Report	Shahril 90+3'	Stadium: Mong Kok Stadium; Attendance: 4,000; Referee: Kao Jung Fang (Taiwan); Assistant referees: Lee Hung Ping, Chen Jia Hao (Taiwan); Fourth official: Chang Chih Chuan (Taiwan)
Note: Singapore Squad List

14 October 2014 Friendly	Macau	2–2	Singapore	Macau
19:00 UTC+8	Leong 53'; Torrão 90+3'	Report	Amri 23', 36'	Stadium: M.U.S.T. Stadium; Referee: Nivon Robesh Gamini (Sri Lanka); Assistant referees: Grant Rojas (Philippines); Zhong Yong (China); Fourth official: Chon Chan (Macau)
Note: Singapore Squad List

7 November 2014 Friendly	Bahrain	2–0	Singapore	Manama, Bahrain
20:00 UTC+3	Sami Al-Husaini 75'; Ismail Abdullatif 67'	Report		Stadium: Bahrain National Stadium
Note: Singapore squad list

13 November 2014 Friendly	Singapore	2–0	Laos	Singapore
20:00 UTC+8	Baihakki 5'; Amri 32'			Stadium: Yishun Stadium; Referee: Farhad Mohamad (Singapore); Assistant referees: Jeffrey Goh, Ong Chai Lee (Singapore); Fourth official: Ahmad A'Qashah (Singapore)
Note: Match Line-ups

17 November 2014 Friendly	Singapore	4–2	Cambodia	Singapore
20:00 UTC+8	Amri 9'; Faris 29'; Shahril 33'; Safuwan 37'	Report	Laboravy 27', 30'	Stadium: Yishun Stadium; Attendance: 1,989; Referee: Nagor Amir Noor Mohamed ( Malaysia); Assistant referees: Jeffrey Goh, Muhd Syarqawi Buhari (Singapore); Fourth official: Sukhbir Singh (Singapore)

23 November 2014 2014 Suzuki Cup	Singapore	1–2	Thailand	Singapore
20:00 UTC+8	Amri 20'	Report	Mongkol 8'; Charyl 90' (pen.)	Stadium: National Stadium; Referee: Alireza Faghani (Iran); Assistant referees: Mansouri Mohammad Reza Davoud (Iran) Kim Young Ha (Korea); Fourth official: Ahmed Al-Kaf (Oman)

26 November 2014 2014 Suzuki Cup	Myanmar	2–4	Singapore	Singapore
20:00 UTC+8	Kyaw Zayar Win 55'; Kyaw Ko Ko 61' (pen.)	Report	Shaiful 15'; Hariss 15', 42'; Khin Maung Lwin 75' (o.g.)	Stadium: National Stadium; Referee: Ilgiz Tantashev (Uzbekistan); Assistant referees: Ruslan Serazitdinov (Uzbekistan); Fahad Awaiedh Al-Amri (Saudi Arabia); Fourth official: Çarymyrat Kurbanow (Turkmenistan)

29 November 2014 2014 Suzuki Cup	Singapore	1–3	Malaysia	Singapore
20:00 UTC+8	Amri 83'	Report	Safee 61'; Safiq 90+3' (pen.); Putra 90+5'	Stadium: National Stadium; Referee: Ahmed Al-Kaf (Oman); Assistant referees: Palitha Hemathunga (Sri Lanka); Kim Young Ha (Korea); Fourth official: Alireza Faghani (Iran)

=== 2015 ===
26 March 2015 Friendly	Thailand	2–0	Singapore	Nakhon Ratchasima, Thailand
19:00	Suttinan Phuk-hom 87'; Pokkhao Anan 90+1'			Stadium: 80th Birthday Anniversary Stadium; Referee: Hettikamkanamge Perera (Sri Lanka)

31 March 2015 Friendly	Singapore	2–2	Guam	Singapore
19:30 UTC+8				Stadium: Jalan Besar Stadium; Referee: Mohd Nafeez Abdul Wahab (Malaysia)

30 May 2015 Friendly	Bangladesh	1–2	Singapore	Dhaka, Bangladesh
18:00	Nasiruddin 4'		Fazrul 32'; Amri 72'	Stadium: Bangabandhu National Stadium

6 June 2015 Friendly	Singapore	5–1	Brunei	Singapore
17:00 UTC+8	Amri 7', 56'; Hariss 37'; Shaiful 44'; Fazrul 65'	Report	Abdul Mu'iz 41'	Stadium: Jurong East Stadium; Attendance: 1,140

11 June 2015 2018 FIFA WCQ	Cambodia	0–4	Singapore	Phnom Penh, Cambodia
18:30 UTC+7		Report (FIFA); Report (AFC)	Amri 9' Safuwan 21', 35'; Fazrul 55'	Stadium: Olympic Stadium; Attendance: 63,000; Referee: Liu Kwok Man (Hong Kong)

16 June 2015 2018 FIFA WCQ	Japan	0–0	Singapore	Saitama, Japan
18:30 UTC+9		Report (FIFA); Report (AFC)		Stadium: Saitama Stadium; Attendance: 57,533; Referee: Mohanad Qasim Eesee Sarray (Iraq)

28 August 2015 Friendly	Qatar	4–0	Singapore	Doha, Qatar
21:00 UTC+3				Stadium: Jassim Bin Hamad Stadium; Referee: Omar Al Yakubi (Oman)

3 September 2015 2018 FIFA WCQ	Syria	1–0	Singapore	Muscat; Oman
20:00 UTC+4				Stadium: Sultan Qaboos Sports Complex; Attendance: 100; Referee: Yousef Al-Marzouq (Kuwait)

8 October 2015 2018 FIFA WCQ	Singapore	1–0	Afghanistan	Singapore
20:00 UTC+8	Amri 72'	Report (FIFA)		Stadium: National Stadium; Attendance: 5,400; Referee: Ng Chiu Kok (Hong Kong)

13 October 2015 2018 FIFA WCQ	Singapore	2–1	Cambodia	Singapore
20:00 UTC+8	Faris 16'; Fazrul 47'		Suhana 66'	Stadium: National Stadium; Attendance: 6,650; Referee: Kim Dae-yong (South Korea)

12 November 2015 2018 FIFA WCQ	Singapore	0–3	Japan	Singapore
19:15 UTC+8				Stadium: National Stadium; Attendance: 33,868; Referee: Fahad Al-Mirdasi (Saudi Arabia)

17 November 2015 2018 FIFA WCQ	Singapore	1–2	Syria	Singapore
20:00 UTC+8	Safuwan 89' (pen.)		Khribin 20', 90+3'	Stadium: National Stadium; Referee: Kim Jong-hyeok (South Korea)

=== 2016 ===
24 March 2016 Friendly	Singapore	2–1	Myanmar	Singapore
19:45 UTC+8	Shahril 27'; Fazrul 87'		Suan Lam Mang 65'	Stadium: Jalan Besar Stadium; Attendance: 5,280

29 March 2016 2018 FIFA WCQ	Afghanistan	2–1	Singapore	Tehran, Iran
15:00 UTC+4:30	Amani 39'; Shirdel 79'		Fazrul 89'	Stadium: Takhti Stadium (Tehran); Referee: Fu Ming (China)

3 June 2016 2016 AYA Bank Cup	Myanmar	0–1	Singapore	Yangon, Myanmar
18:00 UTC+6:30			Faris 35'	Stadium: Thuwunna Stadium

6 June 2016 2016 AYA Bank Cup	Vietnam	3–0 (a.e.t.)	Singapore	Yangon, Myanmar
18:00 UTC+6:30	Lê Công Vinh 91'; Nguyễn Văn Quyết 98'; Đinh Thanh Trung 113'			Stadium: Thuwunna Stadium; Attendance: 6,800; Referee: Khin Maung Win (Myanmar)

28 July 2016 Friendly	Cambodia	2-1	Singapore	Phnom Penh, Cambodia
18:30 UTC+7:00	Chan Vathanaka 19'; Tith Dina 45+1'		Khairul Amri 23'	Stadium: Phnom Penh Olympic Stadium; Referee: Hoang Anh Tuan (Vietnam)

1 September 2016 Friendly	Bahrain	3-1	Singapore	Manama, Bahrain
00:15	Al Rohaimi 9'; Abdulla Yaser 48' ?? 86'		Safuwan Baharudin 37'	Stadium: Bahrain National Stadium

7 October 2016 Friendly	Singapore	0-0	Malaysia	Singapore
19:30 UTC+8:00				Stadium: National Stadium

11 October 2016 Friendly	Hong Kong	2-0	Singapore	Hong Kong
20:00 UTC+8:00	Alex Akande 42' Huang Yang 70'			Stadium: Mong Kok Stadium; Attendance: 4,136

9 November 2016 Friendly	Syria	2-0	Singapore	Negeri Sembilan, Malaysia
20:00 UTC+8:00	Amro Jenyat 65' Khaled Almbayed 70'			Stadium: Tuanku Abdul Rahman Stadium

13 November 2016 Friendly	Singapore	1-0	Cambodia	Singapore
19:45 UTC+8:00	Yasir Hanapi 70'			Stadium: Bishan Stadium; Attendance: 2,946

19 November 2016 2016 AFF Suzuki Cup	Philippines	0-0	Singapore	Bulacan, Philippines
20:00 UTC+8				Stadium: Philippine Sports Stadium; Attendance: 4,339; Referee: Masoud Tufaylieh (Syria)

22 November 2016 2016 AFF Suzuki Cup	Thailand	1-0	Singapore	Bulacan, Philippines
16:30 UTC+8	Sarawut 89'			Stadium: Philippine Sports Stadium; Referee: Rowan Arumughan (India)

25 November 2016 2016 AFF Suzuki Cup	Singapore	1-2	Indonesia	Manila, Philippines
20:00 UTC+8	Amri 27'		Andik 62'; Stefano 85'	Stadium: Rizal Memorial Stadium; Referee: Masoud Tufaylieh (Syria)

=== 2017 ===
23 March 2017 Friendly	Afghanistan	2-1	Singapore	Doha, Qatar
	Sharif Mukhammad 4'; Mustafa Azadzoy 57'	Report	Shawal 46'

28 March 2017 2019 Asian Cup Q	Bahrain	0-0	Singapore	Riffa, Bahrain
19:00 UTC+3	Ali Habib (yellow card) 33'; Ismail Abdullatif (yellow card) 90+2'	Report	Irfan (yellow card) 21'	Stadium: Bahrain National Stadium; Attendance: 225; Referee: Nivon Robesh Gamini (Sri Lanka)

6 June 2017 Non 'A' international	Singapore	1-1	Myanmar	Singapore
	Nazrul 90+4'	Report	Aung Thu 60'	Stadium: Jalan Besar Stadium; Attendance: 0 (Note: Behind closed doors)

10 June 2017 2019 Asian Cup Q	Singapore	1-2	Chinese Taipei	Singapore
19:30 UTC+8	Hariss 6'	Report	Xavier Chen 31'; Chen Chao-an 60'	Stadium: Jalan Besar Stadium; Attendance: 5,234; Referee: Ahmed Al-Ali (Jordan)

13 June 2017 Friendly	Singapore	0-6	Argentina	Singapore
			Fazio 25'; Correa 31'; Gómez 60'; Paredes 74'; Alario 90'; Di María 90+3'	Stadium: National Stadium; Attendance: 28,044

31 August 2017 Friendly	Singapore	1–1	Hong Kong	Singapore
1930 UTC+8	Safuwan Baharudin 76' (pen.)		Chan Siu Ki 1'	Stadium: Jalan Besar Stadium; Referee: Phummarin Khamruen (Thailand)

5 September 2017 2019 Asian Cup Q	Singapore	1–1	Turkmenistan	Singapore
19:30 UTC+8	Shakir Hamzah 63'	Report	Altymyrat Annadurdyýew 82'	Stadium: National Stadium; Attendance: 3,712; Referee: Yudai Yamamoto (Japan)

5 October 2017 Friendly	Qatar	3–1	Singapore	Doha, Qatar
	Almoez Ali 39', 52'; Ahmed Alaaeldin 81'		Faris Ramli 53'	Stadium: Jassim Bin Hamad Stadium; Referee: Ali Sabah (Iraq)

10 October 2017 2019 Asian Cup Q	Turkmenistan	2–1	Singapore	Ashgabat, Turkmenistan
	Vahyt Orazsahedov 18', 90+3'	Report	Irfan Fandi 26'	Stadium: Ashgabat Stadium; Attendance: 15,400; Referee: Ng Chiu Kok (Hong Kong)

9 November 2017 Friendly	Singapore	0–1	Lebanon	Singapore
19:30 UTC+8		Report	Ali Hamam 18'	Stadium: National Stadium; Referee: Sivakorn Pu-udom (Thailand)

14 November 2017 2019 Asian Cup Q	Singapore	0–3	Bahrain	Singapore
19:30 UTC+8		Report	Ali Mahdi 62'; Jamal Rahman 81'; Abu Baker Adam 85'	Stadium: National Stadium; Attendance: 2,628; Referee: Jarred Gillett (Australia)

=== 2018 ===
23 March 2018 Friendly	Singapore	3–2	Maldives	Singapore
21:30 (SGT)	Hariss 38'; Sh. Sulaiman 66' (pen.); Hamzah 72'	Report	Umair 40'; Mahudhee 81'	Stadium: National Stadium; Referee: Ahmad A'Qashah (Singapore)

27 March 2018 2019 Asian Cup Q	Chinese Taipei	1–0	Singapore	Kaohsiung, Taiwan
19:00 UTC+8	Chen Po-liang 37'	Report		Stadium: National Stadium (Kaohsiung); Attendance: 8,139; Referee: Pranjal Banerjee (India)

7 September 2018 Friendly	Singapore	1–1	Mauritius	Singapore
19:30 (SGT)	Ikhsan Fandi 74'	Report	Justin 5'	Stadium: Bishan Stadium; Referee: Muhammad Taqi Aljaafari Bin Jahari (Singapore)

11 September 2018 Friendly	Singapore	2–0	Fiji	Singapore
19:30 (SGT)	Hariss Harun 11'; Ikhsan Fandi 12'	Report		Stadium: Bishan Stadium; Referee: Mongkolchai Pechsri (Thailand)

12 October 2018 Friendly	Singapore	2–0	Mongolia	Singapore
19:30 (SGT)	Hariss Harun 71'; Gabriel Quak 82'; Yasir Hanapi (yellow card) 64'; Nazrul Nazari (yellow card) 88'	Report	Törböt Daginaa (yellow card) 72'; Tsedenbal Norjmoo (yellow card) 86'	Stadium: Bishan Stadium; Referee: Wiwat Jumpaoon (Thailand)

16 October 2018 Friendly	Cambodia	1–2	Singapore	Phnom Penh, Cambodia
19:30 (SGT)	Ho Wai Loon 17' (o.g.); Soeuy Visal (yellow card) 37'	Report	Jacob Mahler 61'; Ikhsan Fandi 75'; Safuwan Baharudin (yellow card) 23'	Stadium: Phnom Penh Olympic Stadium; Referee: Thant Zin Oo (Myanmar)

9 November 2018 2018 AFF Championship	Singapore	1–0	Indonesia	Singapore
20:00 (SGT)	Hariss Harun 37'; Zulqarnaen Suzliman (yellow card) 53'	Report	Rizky Pora (yellow card) 8'; Putu Gede (yellow card) 60' (yellow-red card) 90+4'	Stadium: National Stadium; Attendance: 30,783; Referee: Nguyễn Hiền Triết (Vietnam)

13 November 2018 2018 AFF Championship	Philippines	1–0	Singapore	Bacolod, Philippines
20:00 (SGT)	Reichelt 78'	Report	Safuwan Baharudin (yellow card) 31'; Yasir Hanapi (yellow card) 39'	Stadium: Panaad Stadium; Attendance: 4,327; Referee: Suhaizi Shukri (Malaysia)

21 November 2018 2018 AFF Championship	Singapore	6–1	Timor-Leste	Singapore
20:00 (SGT)	Safuwan Baharudin 12', 19', 90+2'; Ikhsan Fandi 30', 42'; Faris Ramli 90'; Shakir Hamzah (yellow card) 59'	Report	Rufino Gama 13'; Filomeno Junior (yellow card) 29'; Nidio Alves (yellow card) 85'	Stadium: National Stadium; Attendance: 18,408; Referee: Amirul Izwan Yaacob (Malaysia)

25 November 2018 2018 AFF Championship	Thailand	3–0	Singapore	Bangkok, Thailand
20:00 (SGT)	Pansa Hemviboon 12'; Supachai Jaided 23'; Adisak Kraisorn 89'	Report	Zulqarnaen Suzliman (yellow card) 8'; Zulfahmi Arifin (yellow card) 31'; Hariss Harun (yellow card) 61'; Izzdin Shafiq (yellow card) 86'	Stadium: Rajamangala National Stadium; Attendance: 29,763; Referee: Ahmed Faisal Ali (Jordan)

=== 2019 ===
20 March 2019 2019 Airmarine Cup	Malaysia	0–1	Singapore	Kuala Lumpur, Malaysia
20:45 (SGT)		Report (WF); Report (FSA)	Hariss Harun (yellow card) 16'; Huzaifah Aziz (yellow card) 70'; Faris Ramli 82'	Stadium: Bukit Jalil National Stadium; Attendance: 3,741; Referee: Yudi Nurcahya (Indonesia)

23 March 2019 2019 Airmarine Cup	Oman	1–1 (5–4 p)	Singapore	Kuala Lumpur, Malaysia
20:45 (SGT)	Al-Muqbali 22'; Al-Mahaijri (yellow card) 32'; Al-Hosni (yellow card) 89'	Report (WF); Report (FSA)	Faritz Abdul Hameed (yellow card) 36'; Zulfahmi Arifin 90+3'	Stadium: Bukit Jalil National Stadium; Referee: Suhaizi Shukri (Malaysia)
	Penalties
	Al-Muqbali (penalty scored); Al-Mahaijri (penalty scored); Al-Musalami (penalty scored); Khasib (penalty scored); Saleh (penalty scored)		(penalty scored) Safuwan Baharudin; (penalty scored) Yasir Hanapi; (penalty scored) Amirul Adli Azmi; (penalty missed) Faris Ramli; (penalty scored) Hariss Harun

8 June 2019 Friendly	Singapore	4–3	Solomon Islands	Singapore
20:45 (SGT)	Faris Ramli 4'; Shahdan Sulaiman 67'; Gabriel Quak 75'; Hariss Harun 84'		Feni 48'; Abba 58'; Totori 75'	Stadium: Singapore Sports Hub; Referee: Suhaizi Shukri (Malaysia)

11 June 2019 Friendly	Singapore	1–2	Myanmar	Singapore
20:45 (SGT)	Gabriel Quak 25'		Kyaw Ko Ko 5', 68'; Hlaing Bo Bo (yellow card) 52'	Stadium: Singapore Sports Hub; Referee: Suhaizi Shukri (Malaysia)

5 September 2019 2022 FWCQ	Singapore	2–2	Yemen	Singapore
20:45 (SGT)	Ikhsan Fandi 27'; Faris Ramli 52'; Hami Syahin (yellow card) 83'	Report (FIFA); Report (AFC)	Abdulwasea Al-Matari 34' (yellow card) 74'; Mohsen Qarawi 45' (yellow card) 90'; Mudir Al-Radaei (yellow card) 90+3'; Emad Mansoor (yellow card) 90+3'	Stadium: National Stadium; Attendance: 7,018; Referee: Shaun Evans (Australia)

10 September 2019 2022 FWCQ	Singapore	2–1	Palestine	Singapore
20:45 (SGT)	Shakir Hamzah 3'; Safuwan Baharudin 39' (yellow card) 72'; Amirul Adli (yellow card) 64'; Fareez Farhan (yellow card) 83'	Report (FIFA); Report (AFC)	Yaser Hamed 12'; Mohammed Darweesh (yellow card) 46'; Mohammed Yameen (yellow card) 81'; Abdelatif Bahdari (yellow card) 85'	Stadium: Jalan Besar Stadium; Attendance: 6,011; Referee: Yu Ming-hsun (Chinese Taipei)

10 October 2019 2022 FWCQ	Saudi Arabia	3–0	Singapore	Buraidah, Saudi Arabia
20:00 (GST)	Abdulfattah Asiri 28', 67'; Abdullah Al-Hamdan 61'	Report (FIFA); Report (AFC)	Hariss Harun (yellow card) 83'	Stadium: King Abdullah Sport City Stadium; Attendance: 14,560; Referee: Kim Hee-gon (South Korea)

15 October 2019 2022 FWCQ	Singapore	1–3	Uzbekistan	Singapore
19:45 (SGT)	Shawal Anuar (yellow card) 30'; Ikhsan Fandi 45+1'	Report (FIFA); Report (AFC)	Odil Ahmedov 14'; Eldor Shomurodov 51', 90+1'; Jaloliddin Masharipov (yellow card) 57'	Stadium: National Stadium; Referee: Shen Yinhao (China)

14 November 2019 Friendly	Qatar	2–0	Singapore	Doha, Qatar
01:30 (SGT)	Mohammed Muntari 31'; Shahdan Sulaiman 43' (o.g.)	Report	Safuwan Baharudin (yellow card) 37'; Yasir Hanapi (yellow card) 89'	Stadium: Abdullah bin Khalifa Stadium; Referee: Ammar Ashkanani (Kuwait)

19 November 2019 2022 FWCQ	Yemen	1–2	Singapore	Muharraq, Bahrain
23:00 (SGT)	Nasser Al-Gahwashi 85'	Report (FIFA); Report (AFC)	Ikhsan Fandi 19'; Hafiz Nor 52'; Irfan Fandi (yellow card) 79'	Stadium: Sheikh Ali Bin Mohamad Stadium; Attendance: 200; Referee: Minoru Tōjō (Japan); Man of the Match: Ikhsan Fandi

== Head-to-head records ==
Singapore national football team head-to-head records (2000–2019)
Opponent	Pld	W	D	L	GF	GA	GD	Pts	Confederation
Afghanistan	3	1	0	2	3	4	–1	3	AFC
Argentina	1	0	0	1	0	6	–6	0	CONMEBOL
Australia	2	0	1	1	0	3	–3	1	AFC
Azerbaijan	1	0	1	0	2	2	0	1	UEFA
Bahrain	9	1	1	7	6	18	–12	4	AFC
Bangladesh	1	1	0	0	2	1	+1	3	AFC
Brunei	2	2	0	0	6	1	+5	6	AFC
Cambodia	10	9	0	1	25	6	+19	27	AFC
China	6	0	2	4	3	14	–11	2	AFC
Denmark	1	0	0	1	1	5	–4	0	UEFA
Fiji	1	1	0	0	2	0	+2	3	OFC
Hong Kong	14	4	5	5	14	13	+1	17	AFC
India	3	2	0	1	4	1	+3	6	AFC
Indonesia	13	7	3	3	19	11	+8	24	AFC
Iran	2	0	0	2	1	9	–8	0	AFC
Iraq	4	1	0	3	5	13	–8	3	AFC
Japan	5	0	1	4	1	9	–8	1	AFC
Jordan	8	1	0	7	6	20	–14	3	AFC
Kazakhstan	1	0	1	0	0	0	0	1	UEFA
Kuwait	6	1	2	3	6	11	–5	5	AFC
Kyrgyzstan	2	0	1	1	1	2	–1	1	AFC
Laos	9	9	0	0	38	8	+30	27	AFC
Lebanon	3	2	0	1	4	2	+2	6	AFC
Macau	3	2	1	0	5	2	+3	7	AFC
Malaysia	21	7	8	6	27	27	0	29	AFC
Maldives	4	4	0	0	13	3	+10	12	AFC
Mauritius	1	0	1	0	1	1	0	1	CAF
Mongolia	1	1	0	0	2	0	+2	3	AFC
Myanmar	11	9	1	1	25	13	+12	28	AFC
New Zealand	1	1	0	0	3	0	+3	3	OFC
North Korea	4	2	0	2	7	8	–1	6	AFC
Norway	1	0	0	1	2	5	–3	0	UEFA
Oman	10	0	2	8	4	25	–21	2	AFC
Pakistan	2	2	0	0	7	0	+7	6	AFC
Palestine	6	4	1	1	11	2	+9	13	AFC
Papua New Guinea	1	1	0	0	2	1	+1	3	OFC
Philippines	7	3	3	1	8	3	+5	12	AFC
Poland	1	0	0	1	1	6	–5	0	UEFA
Qatar	8	0	0	8	2	23	–21	0	AFC
Saudi Arabia	5	0	0	5	1	13	–12	0	AFC
Solomon Islands	1	1	0	0	4	3	+1	3	OFC
Sri Lanka	1	1	0	0	4	0	+4	3	AFC
Syria	5	1	0	4	3	10	–7	3	AFC
Chinese Taipei	3	1	0	2	4	5	–1	3	AFC
Tajikistan	2	1	1	0	3	1	+2	4	AFC
Thailand	16	3	3	10	11	28	–17	12	AFC
Timor-Leste	1	1	0	0	6	1	+5	3	AFC
Turkmenistan	3	1	1	1	6	5	+1	4	AFC
United Arab Emirates	2	0	1	1	2	3	–1	1	AFC
Uruguay	1	0	0	1	1	2	–1	0	CONMEBOL
Uzbekistan	3	0	0	3	4	13	–9	0	AFC
Vietnam	12	0	7	5	7	15	–8	7	AFC
Yemen	2	1	1	0	4	3	+1	4	AFC
Total	239	89	49	101	326	362	–36	316	
