= Myanmar national football team results (2000–2009) =

This article details the fixtures and results of the Myanmar national football team in 2000s.

== Results and upcoming fixtures ==
Win Draw Lose

=== 2000 ===
5 April 2000 2000 AFC Asian Cup qualification	Myanmar	2–0	Mongolia	Dongdaemun Stadium, Seoul, South Korea
	Soe Myat Min 74'; Myo Hlaing Win 86'	Report

7 April 2000 2000 AFC Asian Cup qualification	Myanmar	4–0	Laos	Dongdaemun Stadium, Seoul, South Korea
	Myo Hlaing Win 32', 62'; Aung Kyaw Moe 43'; Than Toe Aung 51'	Report

9 April 2000 2000 AFC Asian Cup qualification	South Korea	4–0	Myanmar	Dongdaemun Stadium, Seoul, South Korea
	Seol Ki-Hyun 61', 67'; Ahn Hyo-Yeon 78', 85'	Report		Attendance: 15,600; Referee: Hisaharu Kitamura (Japan)

6 August 2000 Friendly	Malaysia	6–0	Myanmar
		Report

9 August 2000 Friendly	Malaysia	1–2	Myanmar
		Report	Aung Khine 75'; Myo Hlaing Win 76'

28 August 2000 Indonesian Independence Cup	Indonesia	4–1	Myanmar
		Report	Zaw Lynn Tun 48'

1 September 2000 Indonesian Independence Cup	Myanmar	1–1	Chinese Taipei
	Aung Khine	Report

6 November 2000 2000 AFF Championship	Thailand	3–1	Myanmar	700th Anniversary Stadium, Chiang Mai
19:00	Kiatisuk Senamuang 4'; Sakesan Pituratana 47'; Surachai Jaturapattarapong 74'	Report	Aung Kyaw Tun 62'	Referee: S. Kumbalingam Kennedy (Singapore)

8 November 2000 2000 AFF Championship	Myanmar	3–0	Philippines	700th Anniversary Stadium, Chiang Mai
19:00	Thet Naing Soe 65'; Zaw Htike 69'; Nay Thu Hlaing 71'	Report		Referee: Nguyễn Văn Mùi (Vietnam)

12 November 2000 2000 AFF Championship	Myanmar	0–5	Indonesia	700th Anniversary Stadium, Chiang Mai
16:00		Report	Gendut Doni Christiawan 43', 57'; Uston Nawawi 70'; Kurniawan Dwi Yulianto 74', 82'	Referee: S. Kumbalingam Kennedy (Singapore)

=== 2002 ===
17 May 2002 Friendly	Myanmar	1–1	Malaysia	Thuwunna YTC Stadium, Yangon
	Aung Kyaw Moe 63'	Report

19 May 2002 Friendly	Myanmar	0–0	Malaysia	Thuwunna YTC Stadium, Yangon
		Report

15 December 2002 2002 AFF Championship	Indonesia	0–0	Myanmar	Gelora Bung Karno Stadium, Jakarta
17:05		Report		Attendance: 40,000; Referee: Abdulhameed Ibrahim (Bahrain)

17 December 2002 2002 AFF Championship	Philippines	1–6	Myanmar	Gelora Bung Karno Stadium, Jakarta
16:05	Gonzalez 81'	Report	Aung Kyaw Moe 18', 52'; Zaw Htaik 35'; Soe Lin Tun 45'; Zaw Zaw 56'; Tint Naing Tun Thein 63'	Referee: Subkhiddin Mohd Salleh (Malaysia)

19 December 2002 2002 AFF Championship	Myanmar	5–0	Cambodia	Gelora Bung Karno Stadium, Jakarta
16:05	Zaw Zaw 47'; Lwin Oo 57', 77'; Zaw Htaik 69'; Tint Naing Tun Thein 83'	Report		Referee: Abdulhameed Ibrahim (Bahrain)

21 December 2002 2002 AFF Championship	Myanmar	2–4	Vietnam	Lebak Bulus Stadium, Jakarta
18:35	Lwin Oo 30'; Htay Aung 80'	Report	T. X. Thành 38'; Đ. P. Nam 48', 66'; L. H. Đức 72' (pen.)	Referee: Santhan Nagalingham (Singapore)

=== 2003 ===
23 March 2003 2004 AFC Asian Cup qualification	Myanmar	5–0	Brunei
	Win Htike 10'; Aung Kyaw Moe 14'; Yan Paing 45', 66'; Lwin Oo 75'	Report

25 March 2003 2004 AFC Asian Cup qualification	Maldives	0–2	Myanmar
		Report	Win Htike 52'; Zaw Zaw 65'

8 October 2003 2004 AFC Asian Cup qualification	Malaysia	4–0	Myanmar	Bukit Jalil Stadium, Kuala Lumpur
	Tengku Hazman 34' 80'; Gilbert Cassidy 67'; Tun Lin Soe 86' (o.g.)	Report		Attendance: 5,500; Referee: Yang Ziqiang (China)

10 October 2003 2004 AFC Asian Cup qualification	Myanmar	1–3	Bahrain	Bukit Jalil Stadium, Kuala Lumpur
	Soe Myat Min 77'	Report	Talal Yousef 14'; A'ala Hubail 49'; Hussain Ali Ahmed 76'	Attendance: 800; Referee: Santhan Nagalingam (Singapore)

12 October 2003 2004 AFC Asian Cup qualification	Iraq	3–0	Myanmar	Bukit Jalil Stadium, Kuala Lumpur
	Haidar Obeid 39'; Ahmad Mnajed 50'; Hesham Mohammed 86'	Report		Attendance: 500; Referee: Yang Ziqiang (China)

20 October 2003 2004 AFC Asian Cup qualification	Bahrain	4–0	Myanmar	Bahrain National Stadium, Manama
	Abdulla Al Marzooqi 22'; Hussain Ali Ahmed 27'; Sayed Mahmood Jalal 45'; Saleh Farhan 45+2' (pen.)	Report		Attendance: 8,000; Referee: Abdullah Al-Harrasi (Oman)

22 October 2003 2004 AFC Asian Cup qualification	Myanmar	1–3	Iraq	Bahrain National Stadium, Manama
	Zaw Zaw 45'	Report	Abbas Hassan 38'; Abbas Rahim 66'; Jassim Swadi 89' (pen.)	Attendance: 300; Referee: Farajollah Yasrebi (Iran)

24 October 2003 2004 AFC Asian Cup qualification	Myanmar	2–1	Malaysia	Bahrain National Stadium, Manama
	Soe Myat Min 25'; Fadzli Saari 43' (o.g.)	Report	Hairuddin Omar 86'	Attendance: 1,000; Referee: Abdullah Al-Harrasi (Oman)

=== 2004 ===
17 March 2004 Friendly	China	2–0	Myanmar
	Zheng Zhi; Xu Yunlong	Report

20 August 2004 Friendly	Vietnam	5–0	Myanmar
		Report

22 August 2004 Friendly	India	2–1	Myanmar
	Prakash 42', 83'	Report	Aung Win Naing 81'

27 November 2004 Friendly	Singapore	1–0	Myanmar
		Report

2 December 2004 Friendly	Hong Kong	2–2	Myanmar
		Report	Yan Paing 28', 84'

8 December 2004 2004 AFF Championship	Philippines	0–1	Myanmar	Bukit Jalil National Stadium, Kuala Lumpur
18:00		Report	San Day Thien 90+2'	Referee: Vo Minh Tri (Vietnam)

10 December 2004 2004 AFF Championship	Thailand	1–1	Myanmar	Bukit Jalil National Stadium, Kuala Lumpur
18:00	Therdsak Chaiman 14'	Report	Zaw Linn Tun 89'	Referee: Masoud Moradi (Iran)

12 December 2004 2004 AFF Championship	Malaysia	0–1	Myanmar	Bukit Jalil National Stadium, Kuala Lumpur
20:45		Report	Soe Myat Min 20'	Referee: Hsu Chao-Lo (Chinese Taipei)

16 December 2004 2004 AFF Championship	Myanmar	3–1	Timor-Leste	Bukit Jalil National Stadium, Kuala Lumpur
18:00	Soe Myat Min 4' (pen.); San Day Thien 43'; Myo Hlaing Win 51'	Report	Diamantino 15' (pen.)	Referee: Hsu Chao-Lo (Chinese Taipei)

29 December 2004 2004 AFF Championship	Myanmar	3–4	Singapore	KLFA Stadium, Kuala Lumpur
19:30	Soe Myat Min 34', 90'; Min Thu 36'	Report	Bennett 20'; Casmir 38'; Alam Shah 63'; Shahril 81'	Referee: Rungklay Mongkol (Thailand)

=== 2005 ===
2 January 2005 2004 AFF Championship	Singapore	4–2 (a.e.t)	Myanmar	National Stadium, Kallang
19:30 UTC+8	Zaw Linn Tun 74' (o.g.); Alam Shah 94', 96'; Casmir 108'	Report	Soe Myat Min 15'; Aung Kyaw Moe 50'	Referee: Toru Kamikawa (Japan)

15 January 2005 2004 AFF Championship	Malaysia	2–1	Myanmar	Jalan Besar Stadium, Jalan Besar
19:30 UTC+8	Khalid 15'; Ismail 56'	Report	S. M. Min 52'	Referee: Vo Minh Tri (Vietnam)

=== 2006 ===
25 August 2006 2006 Merdeka Tournament	Indonesia	0–0	Myanmar	Shah Alam Stadium, Shah Alam, Selangor
18:30		Report

27 August 2006 2006 Merdeka Tournament	Malaysia	1–2	Myanmar	Shah Alam Stadium, Shah Alam, Selangor
20:30	Indra Putra Mahayuddin 13' (pen.)	Report	Kyaw Thu Ra 52'; Soe Myat Min 59'

29 August 2006 2006 Merdeka Tournament	Myanmar	2–1	Indonesia	Shah Alam Stadium, Shah Alam, Selangor
20:30	Kyaw Thu Ra 61'; Soe Myat Min 85'	Report	Zaenal Arif 87'

==== unofficial matches ====
23 August 2006 2006 Merdeka Tournament	Myanmar	2–2	Thailand U-23	Shah Alam Stadium, Shah Alam, Selangor
18:30	Si Thu Win 35', 70'		Teeratep Winothai 19', 45+1'

=== 2007 ===
12 January 2007 2007 AFF Championship	Thailand	1–1	Myanmar	Suphachalasai Stadium, Bangkok
19:00	Nutnum 90+4'	Report	Si Thu Win 25'	Attendance: 15,000; Referee: Hajime Matsuo (Japan)

14 January 2007 2007 AFF Championship	Malaysia	0–0	Myanmar	Suphachalasai Stadium, Bangkok
16:30		Report		Attendance: 28,000; Referee: Võ Minh Trí (Vietnam)

16 January 2007 2007 AFF Championship	Myanmar	0–0	Philippines	Thai Army Sports Stadium, Bangkok
19:00		Report		Attendance: 500; Referee: Abbas Daud (Singapore)

20 August 2007 2007 Merdeka Tournament	Myanmar	1–0	Lesotho	MBPJ Stadium
18:30	Soe Myat Min 49'	Report

25 August 2007 2007 Merdeka Tournament	Myanmar	1–0	Laos	MBPJ Stadium
20:30	Yan Paing 30'	Report

21 October 2007 2010 FIFA World Cup qualification	China	7–0	Myanmar	Century Lotus Stadium, Foshan
20:00 UTC+8	Qu Bo 17', 81'; Du Zhenyu 22'; Yang Lin 58'; Liu Jian 63'; Li Jinyu 76'; Li Weifeng 79'	Report		Attendance: 21,000; Referee: Abdulhameed Ebrahim (Bahrain)

28 October 2007 2010 FIFA World Cup qualification	Myanmar	0–4	China	KLFA Stadium, Kuala Lumpur
16:00 UTC+8		Report	Wu Wei'an 13'; Liu Jian 14'; Zheng Bin 35'; Zhang Yaokun 39' (pen.)	Attendance: 200; Referee: Abdullah Balideh (Qatar)

==== unofficial matches ====
23 August 2007 2007 Merdeka Tournament	Myanmar	2–1	Malaysia U-23	MBPJ Stadium
18:30	Aung Myo Thant 42'; Yan Paing 50'		Mohd Zaquan Adha Abdul Radzak 70'

27 August 2007 2007 Merdeka Tournament	Myanmar	3–1	Zimbabwe B	MBPJ Stadium
18:30	Yan Paing 32', 57'; Yazar Win Thein 88'		Mohd Zaquan Adha Abdul Radzak 70'

29 August 2007 2007 Merdeka Tournament	Myanmar	1–3	Malaysia U-23	MBPJ Stadium
20:30	Tun Tun Win 73'		Mohd Zaquan Adha Abdul Radzak 12'; Khin Maung Lwin 56' (o.g.); Mohd Safee Mohd Sali 60'

=== 2008 ===
31 July 2008 2008 AFC Challenge Cup	Myanmar	3–0	Nepal	Gachibowli Athletic Stadium, Hyderabad
18:30	Yazar Win Thein 66'; Myo Min Tun 76'; Soe Myat Min 86'	Report		Attendance: 150; Referee: Khalid Al-Senan (UAE)

2 August 2008 2008 AFC Challenge Cup	Sri Lanka	1–3	Myanmar	Gachibowli Athletic Stadium, Hyderabad
16:00	Jayasuriya 51'	Report	Soe Myat Min 47'; Yan Paing 70'; Si Thu Win 85'	Attendance: 100; Referee: Valentin Kovalenko (Uzbekistan)

4 August 2008 2008 AFC Challenge Cup	North Korea	1–0	Myanmar	Lal Bahadur Shastri Stadium, Hyderabad
18:30	Ro Hak-Su 15'	Report		Attendance: 100; Referee: Tayeb Shamsuzzaman (Bangladesh)

7 August 2008 2008 AFC Challenge Cup	India	1–0	Myanmar	Gachibowli Athletic Stadium, Hyderabad
16:00	Chhetri 82'	Report		Attendance: 1,500; Referee: Tayeb Shamsuzzaman (Bangladesh)

13 August 2008 2008 AFC Challenge Cup	Myanmar	0–4	North Korea	Ambedkar Stadium, New Delhi
16:00		Report	Pak Song-Chol 10', 12', 44' (pen.); Ro Hak-Su 53'	Attendance: 1,000; Referee: Khalid Al-Senan (UAE)

22 August 2008 2008 Indonesia Independence Cup	Myanmar	7-1	Cambodia	Gelora Bung Karno
21:45	Khin 7'; Thien 21' 45'; Min 50'; Yan 62' 87'; Win 76'	Report	Borey 17'	Attendance: 3,000

1 October 2008 2008 Ho Chi Minh City Cup	Vietnam	2–3	Myanmar
		Report	Tun Tun Win 14'; Yan Paing 68' 45'; Yazar Win Thein 90'

3 October 2008 2008 Ho Chi Minh City Cup	Turkmenistan	2–1	Myanmar
		Report	Yazar Win Thein 68'

18 October 2008 2008 Merdeka Tournament	Bangladesh	0–1	Myanmar	Shah Alam Stadium
20:45		Report	Soe Myat Min 23'

18 October 2008 2008 Merdeka Tournament	Malaysia	4–0	Myanmar	National Stadium, Bukit Jalil
20:45	Indra Putra 26' 76' (pen); Safee 61'; Amirul Hadi 83'	Report		Attendance: 20,000; Referee: Chaiya Alee Mahapab (Thailand)

11 November 2008 2008 Myanmar Grand Royal Challenge Cup	Myanmar	0–0	Bangladesh	Thuwunna YTC Stadium
		Report		Attendance: 5,500

15 November 2008 2008 Myanmar Grand Royal Challenge Cup	Myanmar	2–1	Indonesia	Thuwunna YTC Stadium
	Yan Paing 44', Kyaw Thi Ha 65'	Report	Ismed Sofyan 38'

18 November 2008 2008 Myanmar Grand Royal Challenge Cup	Myanmar	4–1	Malaysia	Thuwunna YTC Stadium
	Soe Myat Min 25', 89'; Myo Min Tun 65'; Aung Kyaw Moe 90+3'		Amirul Hadi 75'	Attendance: 30,000

21 November 2008 2008 Myanmar Grand Royal Challenge Cup	Myanmar	2–1	Indonesia	Thuwunna YTC Stadium
	Soe Myat Min 3', 63'		Moe Win 14' (o.g.)	Attendance: 20,000

5 December 2008 2008 AFF Suzuki Cup	Indonesia	3–0	Myanmar	Gelora Bung Karno Stadium, Jakarta
19:30	Budi 24'; Firman 28'; Bambang 64'	Report		Attendance: 40,000; Referee: Ramachandran Krishnan (Malaysia)

7 December 2008 2008 AFF Suzuki Cup	Singapore	3–1	Myanmar	Gelora Bung Karno Stadium, Jakarta
17:00	Alam Shah 1'; Casmir 16', 74'	Report	Myo Min Tun 28'	Attendance: 21,000; Referee: Phùng Đình Dũng (Vietnam)

9 December 2008 2008 AFF Suzuki Cup	Myanmar	3–2	Cambodia	Jalak Harupat Stadium, Bandung
19:30	Moe Win 29'; Ya Zar Win Thein 35'; Myo Min Tun 85'	Report	Sokumpheak 40'; Borey 77'	Referee: Allan Martinez (Philippines)

==== unofficial matches ====
27 August 2008 2008 Indonesia Independence Cup	U-23 Libya	5–3	Myanmar	Gelora Bung Karno
21:15	Anis 26' 35' 54'; Abdalla 40'; Ali 84'		Min 1' 42'; Paing 75'(pen)	Attendance: 5,000

29 August 2008 2008 Indonesia Independence Cup	U-21 Indonesia	1–0	Myanmar	Gelora Bung Karno
18:30	Mulyana 10'			Attendance: 50,000

16 October 2008 2008 Merdeka Tournament	Myanmar	1–3	Vietnam U-22	Shah Alam Stadium
18:30	Zaw Htet Aung 44'		Thanh Binh 3' 47'; Duc Thien 74'	Attendance: 1,200; Referee: Fredy Chukwa (Timor-Leste)

20 October 2008 2008 Merdeka Tournament	U-20 Mozambique	2–3	Myanmar	National Stadium, Bukit Jalil
18:30	Saize 40'; Peguenino 65'		Min Thu 57'; Soe Myat Min 69'; Khin Maung Lwin 72'

=== 2009 ===
26 April 2009 2010 AFC Challenge Cup qualification	Myanmar	4–0	Macau	Bangabandhu National Stadium, Dhaka
15:30	Khin Maung Lwin 3'; Yazar Win Thein 15'; Pyaye Phyo Oo 48'; Myo Min Tun 59'	Report		Attendance: 3,600; Referee: Dmitriy Mashentsev (Kyrgyzstan)

28 April 2009 2010 AFC Challenge Cup qualification	Bangladesh	1–2	Myanmar	Bangabandhu National Stadium, Dhaka
18:00	E. Hoque 12'	Report	Pai Soe 68', 77'	Attendance: 14,000; Referee: Hajime Matsuo (Japan)

30 April 2009 2010 AFC Challenge Cup qualification	Myanmar	1–0	Cambodia	Bangabandhu National Stadium, Dhaka
15:30	Yazar Win Thein 90+4'	Report		Attendance: 2,500; Referee: Saeid Mozaffarizadeh (Iran)

== Head-to-head records ==
Myanmar national football team head-to-head records (2000–2009)
Opponent	Pld	W	D	L	GF	GA	GD	Pts	Confederation
Bahrain	2	0	0	2	1	7	–6	0	AFC
Bangladesh	3	2	1	0	3	1	+2	7	AFC
Brunei	1	1	0	0	5	0	+5	3	AFC
Cambodia	3	3	0	0	9	2	+7	9	AFC
China	2	0	0	2	0	6	–6	0	AFC
Chinese Taipei	1	0	1	0	1	1	0	1	AFC
Hong Kong	1	0	1	0	2	2	0	1	AFC
India	2	0	0	2	1	3	–2	0	AFC
Indonesia	6	2	1	3	5	12	–7	7	AFC
Iraq	2	0	0	2	1	6	–5	0	AFC
Laos	3	3	0	0	7	0	+7	9	AFC
Lesotho	1	1	0	0	1	0	+1	3	CAF
Macau	1	1	0	0	4	0	+4	3	AFC
Malaysia	7	2	2	3	8	15	–7	8	AFC
Maldives	1	1	0	0	2	0	+2	3	AFC
Mongolia	1	1	0	0	2	0	+2	3	AFC
North Korea	1	0	0	1	0	1	–1	0	AFC
Philippines	3	2	1	0	9	1	+8	7	AFC
Singapore	4	0	1	3	5	8	–3	1	AFC
South Korea	1	0	0	1	0	4	–4	0	AFC
Sri Lanka	1	0	0	1	1	3	–2	0	AFC
Thailand	3	0	1	2	2	5	–3	1	AFC
Timor-Leste	1	1	0	0	3	1	+2	3	AFC
Turkmenistan	1	0	0	1	1	2	–1	0	AFC
Vietnam	3	1	1	1	5	9	–4	4	AFC
Total	55	21	9	25	78	89	–11	72	
