= 2004 AFF Championship =

Giải vô địch bóng đá Đông Nam Á 2004 2004 Kejohanan Bola Sepak ASEAN

Tournament details
- Host country: Vietnam; Malaysia (for group stage)
- Dates: 7 December 2004 – 16 January 2005
- Teams: 10
- Venues: 5 (in 4 host cities)

Final positions
- Champions: Singapore (2nd title)
- Runners-up: Indonesia
- Third place: Malaysia
- Fourth place: Myanmar

Tournament statistics
- Matches played: 27
- Goals scored: 113 (4.19 per match)
- Top scorer(s): (Indonesia) Ilham Jaya Kesuma (7 goals)
- Best player: (Singapore) Lionel Lewis

The 2004 AFF Championship (officially known as the 2004 Tiger Cup for sponsorship reasons) was the 5th edition of the AFF Championship, the football championship of nations affiliated to the ASEAN Football Federation (AFF), and the last time under the name Tiger Cup. This was the first time a new format had been applied, in which the format was still in use until now. The group stage was jointly hosted by Vietnam and Malaysia from 7 to 16 December 2004, and the top two teams from each group advanced to the Semi-finals and the Final, which was played in a two-leg home-and-away format from 28 December 2004 to 16 January 2005. This was also the final AFF Cup to feature a third-place match, as it was removed in the 2007 edition.

Thailand were the two-time defending champions, but were eliminated in Group stage. Singapore won the tournament by a 5–2 victory in the two-legged final against Indonesia to secure their second title.

== Summary ==
In the group matches, Indonesia, coached by former Thailand coach Peter Withe, emerged as the Group A winners with ten points, 17 goals scored and none conceded. They were the hot favourites to win the 2004 AFF Championship after bundling out the hosts Vietnam with an unexpected 3–0 victory. Less than a day after the match had ended, the Vietnam Football Federation requested the resignation from its national coach Edson Tavares, despite his requests to stay on until the last match. Singapore, led by Radojko Avramović pipped out the hosts by just a single point and remained unbeaten to become the only team in the championship to not lose a single match.

Following the tournament motto "Anything can happen", Myanmar, under coach Ivan Kolev emerged as the surprise, holding defending champions Thailand to a draw and beating Malaysia on their own turf.

== Teams ==
All teams from member associations of the ASEAN Football Federation (AFF) participated with the exception of Brunei. However, they would be replaced by East Timor when sponsors Tiger Beer stated in May 2004 that the world's newest country at the time would be joining the competition. This kept the tournament at 10 teams.

== Venues ==
(Vietnam) Hanoi	(Vietnam) Ho Chi Minh City	(Vietnam) Hai Phong	(Indonesia) Jakarta
Mỹ Đình National Stadium	Thống Nhất Stadium	Lạch Tray Stadium	Gelora Bung Karno Stadium
Capacity: 40,192	Capacity: 15,000	Capacity: 32,000	Capacity: 110,000
Singapore		(Malaysia) Kuala Lumpur	
National Stadium	Jalan Besar Stadium	Bukit Jalil National Stadium	KLFA Stadium
Capacity: 55,000	Capacity: 6,000	Capacity: 100,000	Capacity: 18,000

== Group stage ==
=== Group A ===
- All times are Indochina Time (ICT) – UTC+7
- All matches were played in Vietnam.

Team	Pld	W	D	L	GF	GA	GD	Pts	Qualification
Indonesia	4	3	1	0	17	0	+17	10	Advance to knockout stage
Singapore	4	2	2	0	10	3	+7	8	Advance to knockout stage
Vietnam (H)	4	2	1	1	13	5	+8	7	
Laos	4	1	0	3	4	16	−12	3	
Cambodia	4	0	0	4	2	22	−20	0	

7 December 2004
17:00

Laos	0–6	Indonesia
		Boaz 25'; Ilham 28', 33'; Siththalay 52' (o.g.); Elie 60'; Kurniawan 86'

Thống Nhất Stadium, Ho Chi Minh City
Referee: Rungklay Mongkol (Thailand)
7 December 2004
19:30

Vietnam	1–1	Singapore
Thạch Bảo Khanh 51'		Indra 70'

Thống Nhất Stadium, Ho Chi Minh City
Referee: Sun Baojie (China)

9 December 2004
17:00

Vietnam	9–1	Cambodia
Thạch Bảo Khanh 9', 23'; Lê Công Vinh 57', 87', 89'; Sampratna 63' (o.g.); Đặng Văn Thành 71', 83'; Nguyễn Huy Hoàng 77'		Sokunthea 44'

Thống Nhất Stadium, Ho Chi Minh City
Referee: Ahmad Khalidi Supian (Malaysia)
9 December 2004
19:30

Indonesia	0–0	Singapore

Thống Nhất Stadium, Ho Chi Minh City
Referee: Kwon Jong-Chul (South Korea)

11 December 2004
17:00

Laos	2–1	Cambodia
Chalana 63', 73'		Darith 27'

Mỹ Đình National Stadium, Hanoi
Referee: Kwon Jong-Chul (South Korea)
11 December 2004
19:30

Vietnam	0–3	Indonesia
		Mauli 18'; Boaz 21'; Ilham 45'

Mỹ Đình National Stadium, Hanoi
Referee: Abdulhameed Ebrahim (Bahrain)

13 December 2004
17:00

Singapore	6–2	Laos
Hasrin 7'; Indra 19', 74'; Sengphet 39' (o.g.); Casmir 45', 90+2' (pen.)		Visay 22'; Chalana 72' (pen.)

Mỹ Đình National Stadium, Hanoi
Referee: Ahmad Khalidi Supian (Malaysia)
13 December 2004
19:30

Indonesia	8–0	Cambodia
Ilham 5', 48', 56'; Elie 30', 55'; Kurniawan 74', 76'; Ortizan 90'

Mỹ Đình National Stadium, Hanoi
Referee: Sun Baojie (China)

15 December 2004
18:00

Vietnam	3–0	Laos
Lê Công Vinh 10'; Nguyễn Minh Phương 42'; Thạch Bảo Khanh 75'

Mỹ Đình National Stadium, Hanoi
Referee: Rungklay Mongkol (Thailand)
15 December 2004
18:00

Cambodia	0–3	Singapore
		Dickson 20'; Baihakki 26'; Khairul 54'

Lạch Tray Stadium, Hai Phong
Referee: Abdulhameed Ebrahim (Bahrain)

=== Group B ===
- All times are Malaysia Standard Time (MST) – UTC+8
- All matches were played in Malaysia.

Team	Pld	W	D	L	GF	GA	GD	Pts	Qualification
Myanmar	4	3	1	0	6	2	+4	10	Advance to knockout stage
Malaysia (H)	4	3	0	1	11	3	+8	9	Advance to knockout stage
Thailand	4	2	1	1	13	4	+9	7	
Philippines	4	1	0	3	4	9	−5	3	
Timor-Leste	4	0	0	4	2	18	−16	0	

8 December 2004
18:00

Philippines	0–1	Myanmar
		San Day Thein 90+2'

Bukit Jalil National Stadium, Kuala Lumpur
Referee: Võ Minh Trí (Vietnam)
8 December 2004
20:45

Malaysia	5–0	Timor-Leste
Liew 27'; Amri 47', 83'; Fadzli 67'; Shukor 85'

Bukit Jalil National Stadium, Kuala Lumpur
Referee: Subash Anthony Lazar (Singapore)

10 December 2004
18:00

Thailand	1–1	Myanmar
Therdsak 14'		Zaw Linn Tun 89'

Bukit Jalil National Stadium, Kuala Lumpur
Referee: Masoud Moradi (Iran)
10 December 2004
20:45

Malaysia	4–1	Philippines
Liew 17'; Khalid 67', 77' (pen.); Kaironnisam 74'		Gould 90+3'

Bukit Jalil National Stadium, Kuala Lumpur
Referee: Jimmy Napitupulu (Indonesia)

12 December 2004
18:00

Timor-Leste	0–8	Thailand
		Banluesak 17'; Suriya 41'; Weerayut 53'; Therdsak 59'; Sarayuth 63', 65', 67'; Yuttajak 84'

Bukit Jalil National Stadium, Kuala Lumpur
Referee: Võ Minh Trí (Vietnam)
12 December 2004
20:45

Malaysia	0–1	Myanmar
		Soe Myat Min 20'

Bukit Jalil National Stadium, Kuala Lumpur
Referee: Hsu Chao-Lo (Chinese Taipei)

14 December 2004
18:00

Philippines	2–1	Timor-Leste
Caligdong 90+1', 90+3'		Januário 59'

Bukit Jalil National Stadium, Kuala Lumpur
Referee: Jimmy Napitupulu (Indonesia)
14 December 2004
20:45

Malaysia	2–1	Thailand
Khalid 63', 65'		Sarayuth 45'

Bukit Jalil National Stadium, Kuala Lumpur
Referee: Masoud Moradi (Iran)

16 December 2004
18:00

Myanmar	3–1	Timor-Leste
Soe Myat Min 4' (pen.); San Day Thein 43'; Myo Hlaing Win 51'		Simon 15' (pen.)

Bukit Jalil National Stadium, Kuala Lumpur
Referee: Hsu Chao-Lo (Chinese Taipei)
16 December 2004
18:00

Thailand	3–1	Philippines
Ittipol 42'; Sarif 56'; Suriya 89'		Caligdong 27'

KLFA Stadium, Kuala Lumpur
Referee: Subash Anthony Lazar (Singapore)

== Knockout stage ==
=== Bracket ===
Semi-finals
A1	Indonesia	1	4	5
B2	Malaysia	2	1	3
B1	Myanmar	3	2	5
A2	Singapore (a.e.t.)	4	4	8

Final
A1	Indonesia	1	1	2
A2	Singapore	3	2	5
Third place play-off
B2	Malaysia	2
B1	Myanmar	1

=== Semi-finals ===
First legs

28 December 2004
19:45 UTC+7

Indonesia	1–2	Malaysia
Kurniawan 6'		Liew 28', 47'

Gelora Bung Karno Stadium, Jakarta
Referee: Ravshan Irmatov (Uzbekistan)

29 December 2004
19:30 UTC+8

Myanmar	3–4	Singapore
Soe Myat Min 34', 90'; Min Thu 36'		Bennett 20'; Casmir 38'; Alam Shah 63'; Shahril 81'

KLFA Stadium, Kuala Lumpur
Referee: Rungklay Mongkol (Thailand)

Second legs

2 January 2005
19:30 UTC+8

Singapore	4–2 (a.e.t.)	Myanmar
Zaw Linn Tun 74' (o.g.); Alam Shah 94', 96'; Casmir 108'	Report	Soe Myat Min 15'; Aung Kyaw Moe 50'

National Stadium, Kallang
Referee: Toru Kamikawa (Japan)

Singapore won 8–5 on aggregate.

3 January 2005 (Note: This match was moved by two days from 1 January 2005 as a mark for respect for the victims of the Indian Ocean tsunami catastrophe.)
20:00 UTC+8

Malaysia	1–4	Indonesia
Khalid 28'		Kurniawan 59'; Charis 74'; Ilham 77'; Boaz 84'

Bukit Jalil National Stadium, Kuala Lumpur
Referee: Kunsuta Chaiwat (Thailand)

Indonesia won 5–3 on aggregate.

=== Third place play-off ===
15 January 2005
19:30 UTC+8

Malaysia	2–1	Myanmar
Khalid 15'; Nor Ismail 56'		Soe Myat Min 52'

Jalan Besar Stadium, Jalan Besar
Referee: Võ Minh Trí (Vietnam)

=== Final ===
First leg

8 January 2005
19:45 UTC+7

Indonesia	1–3	Singapore
Mahyadi 90'		Bennett 3'; Khairul 39'; Casmir 69'

Gelora Bung Karno Stadium, Jakarta
Referee: Kwon Jong-Chul (South Korea)

Second leg

16 January 2005
19:45 UTC+8

Singapore	2–1	Indonesia
Indra 6'; Casmir 41' (pen.)		Elie 77'

National Stadium, Kallang
Referee: Khalil Al Ghamdi (Saudi Arabia)

Singapore won 5–2 on aggregate.

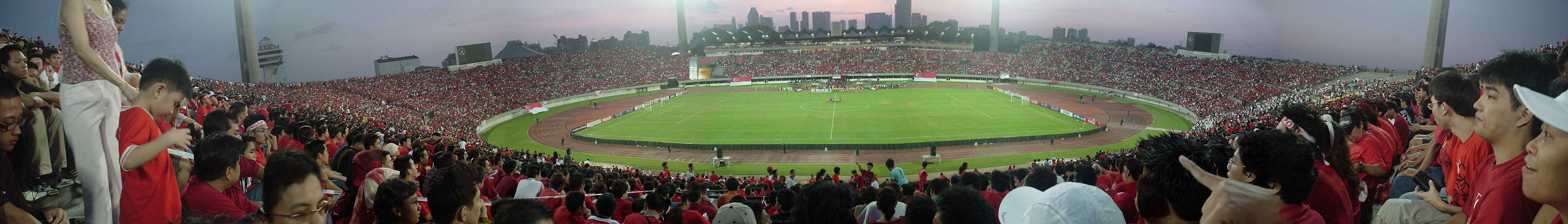
View of the Singapore National Stadium just before the commencement of the 2004 AFF Championship finals match.

== Awards ==
2004 AFF Championship

Singapore
Second title

Most Valuable Player	Golden Boot
(Singapore) Lionel Lewis	(Indonesia) Ilham Jaya Kesuma

== Goalscorers ==
7 goals

- (Indonesia) Ilham Jaya Kesuma

6 goals

- (Malaysia) Khalid Jamlus
- (Myanmar) Soe Myat Min
- (Singapore) Agu Casmir

5 goals

- (Indonesia) Kurniawan Dwi Yulianto

4 goals

- (Indonesia) Elie Aiboy
- (Malaysia) Liew Kit Kong
- (Singapore) Indra Sahdan Daud
- (Thailand) Sarayuth Chaikamdee
- (Vietnam) Thạch Bảo Khanh
- (Vietnam) Lê Công Vinh

3 goals

- (Indonesia) Boaz Solossa
- (Laos) Chalana Luang-Amath
- (Philippines) Emelio Caligdong
- (Singapore) Noh Alam Shah

2 goals

- (Malaysia) Mohd Amri Yahyah
- (Myanmar) San Day Thien
- (Singapore) Daniel Bennett
- (Singapore) Khairul Amri
- (Thailand) Therdsak Chaiman
- (Thailand) Suriya Domtaisong
- (Vietnam) Đặng Văn Thành

1 goal

- (Cambodia) Hing Darith
- (Cambodia) Hang Sokunthea
- (Indonesia) Charis Yulianto
- (Indonesia) Mahyadi Panggabean
- (Indonesia) Mauli Lessy
- (Indonesia) Ortizan Solossa
- (Laos) Visay Phaphouvanin
- (Malaysia) Fadzli Saari
- (Malaysia) Nor Ismail
- (Malaysia) Kaironnisam Sahabudin
- (Malaysia) Shukor Adan
- (Myanmar) Aung Kyaw Moe
- (Myanmar) Min Thu
- (Myanmar) Zaw Linn Tun
- (Myanmar) Myo Hlaing Win
- (Philippines) Chad Gould
- (Singapore) Baihakki Khaizan
- (Singapore) Itimi Dickson
- (Singapore) Hasrin Jailani
- (Singapore) Sharil Ishak
- (Thailand) Weerayut Jitkuntod
- (Thailand) Yuttajak Kornjan
- (Thailand) Ittipol Poolsap
- (Thailand) Sarif Sainui
- (Thailand) Banluesak Yodyingyong
- (Timor-Leste) Januário do Rego
- (Timor-Leste) Simon Diamantino
- (Vietnam) Nguyễn Huy Hoàng
- (Vietnam) Nguyễn Minh Phương

Own goal

- (Cambodia) Sun Sampratna (For Vietnam)
- (Laos) Sengphet Thongphachan (For Singapore)
- (Laos) Siththalay Kanyavong (For Indonesia)
- (Myanmar) Zaw Linn Tun (For Singapore)

== Team statistics ==
This table will show the ranking of teams throughout the tournament.

Pos	Team	Pld	W	D	L	GF	GA	GD
Finals
1	Singapore	8	6	2	0	23	10	+13
2	Indonesia	8	4	1	3	24	8	+16
Semifinals
3	Malaysia	7	5	0	2	16	9	+7
4	Myanmar	7	3	1	3	12	12	0
Eliminated in the group stage
5	Thailand	4	2	1	1	13	4	+9
6	Vietnam	4	2	1	1	13	5	+8
7	Philippines	4	1	0	3	4	9	−5
8	Laos	4	1	0	3	4	16	−12
9	Timor-Leste	4	0	0	4	2	18	−16
10	Cambodia	4	0	0	4	2	22	−20
