= Atthipol Poolsap =

Thai footballer (born 1984)

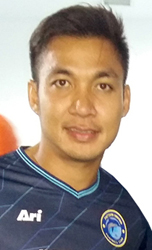

Personal information
- Full name: Atthipol Poolsap
- Date of birth: 8 April 1984 (age 42)
- Place of birth: Udon Thani, Thailand
- Height: 1.75 m (5 ft 9 in)
- Position: Attacking midfielder

Youth career
- Bangkok Christian College

Senior career*
Years	Team	Apps	(Gls)
2004–2006	Thailand Tobacco Monopoly	38	(9)
2007	PEA	18	(3)
2008–2013	Pattaya United	43	(7)
2014	BEC Tero Sasana	0	(0)
2014	Police United	17	(0)
2015–2017	Port	31	(2)
2017–2018	Pattaya United	8	(0)

International career
2007	Thailand U23		
2004	Thailand	2	(1)
- * Club domestic league appearances and goals as of 04:29, 17 November 2017 (UTC)

Atthipol Poolsap (Thai อิทธิพล พูลทรัพย์, born April 8, 1984), simply known as Tor (Thai: ต่อ), or Ittipol Poolsap is a retired professional footballer from Thailand.

== International goals ==
#	Date	Venue	Opponent	Score	Result	Competition
1.	December 16, 2004	Kuala Lumpur, Malaysia	Philippines	1–1	3–1	2004 Tiger Cup

== Honours ==
=== Club ===
TTM Phichit F.C.

- Thai League 1 Champions (1) : 2004
- Kor Royal Cup winner (1) : 2005

=== International ===
Thailand U-23

- Sea Games Gold Medal (1); 2007
