= Suriya Domtaisong =

Thai footballer

Personal information
- Full name: Suriya Domtaisong
- Date of birth: 20 January 1981 (age 45)
- Place of birth: Buriram, Thailand
- Height: 1.72 m (5 ft 7 1/2 in)
- Position: Striker

Youth career
- Bangkok University

Senior career*
Years	Team	Apps	(Gls)
2002–2004	Bangkok University	31	(12)
2005–2006	→ Kelantan FA (loan)	24	(6)
2006–2008	Bangkok University	47	(18)
2009	Muangthong United	11	(2)
2009–2010	Buriram PEA	31	(10)
2011–2012	Buriram	29	(13)
2012–2013	Buriram United	46	(11)
2014–2015	Surin City	19	(2)
Total		238	(74)

International career
2004–2006	Thailand	26	(2)
- * Club domestic league appearances and goals as of November 19, 2008

Suriya Domtaisong (Thai: สุริยา ดอมไธสง; born January 20, 1981) is a Thai retired professional footballer who played as a striker.

== International career ==
Suriya played for the Thailand national team. He played 26 games and scored two goals.

== International goals ==
#	Date	Venue	Opponent	Score	Result	Competition
1.	December 12, 2004	Bukit Jalil National Stadium, Kuala Lumpur, Malaysia	Timor-Leste	8–0	Won	2004 Tiger Cup
2.	December 16, 2004	KLFA Stadium, Kuala Lumpur, Malaysia	Philippines	3–1	Won	2004 Tiger Cup

== Honours ==
=== Club ===
Bangkok University

- Thai Division 1 League (1): 2002
- Thai Premier League (1): 2006

Buriram

- Thai Division 1 League (1): 2011

Buriram United

- Thai Premier League : 2013
- Thai FA Cup (2) : 2012, 2013
- Thai League Cup (2): 2012, 2013
- Kor Royal Cup : 2013
