= Hasrin Jailani =

Singaporean footballer (born 1975)

Personal information
- Full name: Hasrin bin Jailani
- Date of birth: 22 November 1975
- Place of birth: Singapore
- Height: 1.73 m (5 ft 8 in)
- Position: Midfielder

Team information
- Current team: Tanjong Pagar United (technical advisor)

Senior career*
Years	Team	Apps	(Gls)
1991–1995	Geylang International	?	(?)
1996–1998	Home United	??	(??)
1999–2001	Geylang United	25	(2)
2002	Woodlands Wellington	29	(4)
2003–2005	Geylang United	72	(7)
2006–2009	Woodlands Wellington	53	(0)

International career
1998–2005	Singapore	26	(1)

Managerial career
- 2016–2017: Geylang International
- 2020: Tanjong Pagar United (assistant)
- 2020–2024: Tanjong Pagar United
- 2024: Tanjong Pagar United (technical advisor)
- 2024–: Geylang International (assistant)
- * Club domestic league appearances and goals

Hasrin bin Jailani (born 22 November 1975) is a Singaporean football manager and former footballer who is currently the assistant coach of Singapore Premier League club Geylang International.

== Playing career ==
=== Geylang International ===
Hasrin started his career for Singaporean side Geylang International where he played for them until 1995.

=== Home United ===
Hasrin joined Home United in the inaugural created S.League in 1996 while serving his compulsory National Service in the Singapore Police Force.

=== Geylang United ===
After the completion of his NS, Hasrin returned to Geylang. In 2001, he helped the club win the 2001 S.League title.

=== Woodlands Wellington ===
In 2002, Hasrin joined Woodlands Wellington.

=== Returned to Geylang United ===
After spending a season at Woodlands Wellington, Hasrin returned to his former club in 2003.

=== Returned to Woodlands Wellington ===
In 2006, Hasrin joined Woodlands Wellington where he was part of the team that won the 2007 Singapore League Cup.

== International career ==
Hasrin has amassed a total of 26 cap for Singapore scoring one goal against Laos on 13 December 2004 during the 2004 AFF Championship tournament.

=== International goals ===
No.	Date	Venue	Cap	Opponent	Score	Result	Competition
1.	13 December 2004	Mỹ Đình National Stadium, Hanoi, Vietnam	19	Laos	1–0	6–2	2004 AFF Championship

== Style of play ==
Hasrin mainly operated as a midfielder and was known for his work ethic.

== Managerial career ==
=== Geylang International ===
Hasrin managed Singaporean side Geylang International in 2016, where he was described as "performed admirably to guide his side to a fifth-place finish in the S.League". On 20 June 2017, he resigned his role from the club.

=== Tanjong Pagar United ===
After Tanjong Pagar United was revived ahead of the 2020 season, Hasrin was appointed as the assistant coach under Hairi Su'ap. After Hairi resigned on 14 October, Hasrin was then promoted as the head coach for the club.

On 3 September 2024, Hasrin was then re-designated as the club technical director while Hyrizan Jufri was appointed as the interim head coach for Tanjong Pagar United.

== Personal life ==
Hasrin is the 3rd born son of Jailani Bin Shaif and Sa'adiah Ja'amat. The two other sibling, Mohd Harris Jailani and Sahril Jailani Hasrin grew up and inspired by Italy international, Roberto Baggio and Malik Awab as his football idol.

== Honours ==
=== Club ===
==== Geylang United ====
- S.League: 2001

==== Woodlands Wellington ====
- Singapore League Cup: 2007
