= Mahyadi Panggabean =

Indonesian footballer

Personal information
- Full name: Mahyadi Panggabean
- Date of birth: 8 January 1982 (age 44)
- Place of birth: Central Tapanuli Regency, Indonesia
- Height: 1.73 m (5 ft 8 in)
- Positions: Left back; left winger

Senior career*
Years	Team	Apps	(Gls)
1999−2000	Persebsi Sibolga	12	(0)
2000−2002	PSTT Central Tapanuli	33	(3)
2002−2008	PSMS Medan	118	(25)
2008−2010	Persik Kediri	50	(4)
2010−2013	Sriwijaya	60	(2)
2013–2014	Gresik United	15	(0)
2014–2015	Persela Lamongan	20	(0)
2015–2016	Persik Kediri	18	(1)
2021	PS Palembang	10	(0)
2025	Sriwijaya	2	(0)
Total		275	(31)

International career
2003−2005	Indonesia U23		
2004−2011	Indonesia	18	(1)

Managerial career
- 2022–2025: Sriwijaya (assistant)
- 2025–: Sumsel United (assistant)
- * Club domestic league appearances and goals as of 10 February 2025

Mahyadi Panggabean (born 8 January 1982) is an Indonesian former football player and assistant coach of Championship club Sumsel United. He played as a defender, and at times as a midfielder, for the Indonesia national team.

== Participation in national team ==
- 2003 SEA Games Vietnam (U-23)
- 2004 Pre World Cup Qualifying vs Turkmenistan
- 2004 Tiger Cup
- 2005 SEA Games Filipina (U-23)
- 2007 AFF Cup and Asian Cup

== International career ==
=== International goals ===
No.	Date	Venue	Opponent	Score	Result	Competition
1.	8 January 2005	Gelora Bung Karno Stadium, Jakarta, Indonesia	Singapore	1–3	1–3	2004 Tiger Cup

== Honours ==
PSMS Medan

- Bang Yos Gold Cup: 2004, 2005, 2006
- Liga Indonesia Premier Division runner up: 2007–08

Sriwijaya

- Indonesia Super League: 2011–12
- Indonesian Community Shield: 2010
- Indonesian Inter Island Cup: 2010, 2012

Indonesia

- AFF Championship runner-up: 2004
