= Elie Aiboy =

Indonesian footballer (born 1979)

Personal information
- Full name: Elie Aiboy
- Date of birth: 20 April 1979 (age 47)
- Place of birth: Jayapura, Indonesia
- Height: 1.72 m (5 ft 8 in)
- Position: Right winger

Team information
- Current team: PSBS Biak (assistant)

Youth career
- 1995–1996: PSSI Baretti
- 1996–1997: Diklat Ragunan

Senior career*
Years	Team	Apps	(Gls)
1997–1998	PSB Bogor	15	(2)
1998–1999	Persipura Jayapura	16	(2)
1999–2002	Semen Padang	58	(12)
2003–2005	Persija Jakarta	42	(8)
2005–2007	Selangor	42	(5)
2007–2008	Arema Malang	26	(6)
2008–2009	PSMS Medan	40	(6)
2009–2010	Persidafon Dafonsoro	20	(11)
2010–2013	Semen Padang	48	(5)
2013–2014	Persih Tembilahan	14	(3)
2014–2015	Persip Pekalongan	11	(0)
Total		307	(60)

International career
1999–2001	Indonesia U23		(3)
2001–2012	Indonesia	54	(8)

Managerial career
- 2019–2021: Persewar Waropen
- 2023–: PSBS Biak (assistant)
- * Club domestic league appearances and goals

Elie Aiboy (born 20 April 1979) is an Indonesian former football player who last played for Persip Pekalongan. He has 54 caps and 8 goals for Indonesia national football team.

He played for Arema Malang in the 2007 AFC Champions League group stage, where he scored one goal.

== International Goals ==
Elie Aiboy: International goals
No.	Date	Venue	Opponent	Score	Result	Competition
1	26 September 2003	Bukit Jalil National Stadium, Kuala Lumpur, Malaysia	Malaysia	1–0	1–1	Friendly match
2	9 June 2004	Gelora Bung Karno Stadium, Jakarta, Indonesia	Sri Lanka	1–0	1–0	2006 FIFA World Cup qualification
3	25 July 2004	Shandong Sports Center, Jinan, China	Bahrain	1–2	1–3	2004 AFC Asian Cup
4	7 December 2004	Thong Nhat Stadium, Ho Chi Minh City, Vietnam	Laos	5–0	6–0	2004 Tiger Cup
5	13 December 2004	Mỹ Đình National Stadium, Hanoi, Vietnam	Cambodia	2–0	8–0	2004 Tiger Cup
6	13 December 2004	Mỹ Đình National Stadium, Hanoi, Vietnam	Cambodia	4–0	8–0	2004 Tiger Cup
7	16 January 2005	Singapore National Stadium, Kallang, Singapore	Singapore	1–2	1–2	2004 Tiger Cup
8	14 July 2007	Gelora Bung Karno Stadium, Jakarta, Indonesia	Saudi Arabia	1–1	1–2	2007 AFC Asian Cup

== Statistics ==
Team	Season	Domestic League		Domestic Cup		Asia Competition^{1}		Other Tournaments^{2}		Total	
Team	Season	Apps	Goals	Apps	Goals	Apps	Goals	Apps	Goals	Apps	Goals
Semen Padang	2010–11	29	1	0	0	0	0	–		29	1
Semen Padang	2011–12	16	1	0	0	0	0	–		16	1
Total		45	2	0	0	0	0	0	0	45	2

== Honours ==
Selangor FA

- Malaysia Premier League: 2005
- Malaysia FA Cup: 2005
- Malaysia Cup: 2005

Semen Padang

- Indonesia Premier League: 2011–12
- Indonesian Community Shield: 2013
- Piala Indonesia runner-up: 2012

Indonesia

- AFF Championship runner-up: 2002, 2004

Individual

- FA Cup Malaysia Most Valuable Player: 2005

Preceded by Bambang Pamungkas	Indonesian Captain; 2012–2013	Succeeded by Firman Utina
