= Nor Ismail =

Malaysian footballer

Personal information
- Full name: Mohamad Nor Bin Ismail
- Date of birth: 20 August 1982 (age 44)
- Place of birth: Melaka, Malaysia
- Height: 1.77 m (5 ft 9 1/2 in)
- Position: Striker

Team information
- Current team: Felda United (U-19 Head coach)

Senior career*
Years	Team	Apps	(Gls)
2002–2004	Kuala Lumpur FA		
2005–2006	Johor FC		
2007–2008	Perak FA		
2009	Kuala Muda Naza FC		
2010–2015	Sime Darby FC		

International career^{‡}
2004–2005	Malaysia	7	(1)
- * Club domestic league appearances and goals as of 14 April 2013 ‡ National team caps and goals as of 14 April 2013

Mohamad Nor Bin Ismail (born 20 August 1982) is a Malaysian former international footballer who played as a striker.

Mohd Nor started his career with Kuala Lumpur FA. He was transferred to Perak during the 2005 season after spending four years with Kuala Lumpur FA. Later he was transferred to Johor FC but returned to Perak FA during the 2007/08 season.

Mohd Nor was called for duty with the Malaysia national team during the 2006 World Cup qualifier. Since then, he was selected part of Malaysia squad. He played for the 2004 Tiger Cup where Malaysia finished third after defeating Myanmar 2-1. He was also representing the Malaysia national under 23 side that won the bronze medal at the 2005 SEA Games.

== International Senior Goals ==
#	Date	Venue	Opponent	Score	Result	Competition
1.	15 January 2005	Singapore, Singapore	Myanmar	2-1	Win	2004 Tiger Cup Third/Fourth Place
