= Thạch Bảo Khanh =

Vietnamese footballer

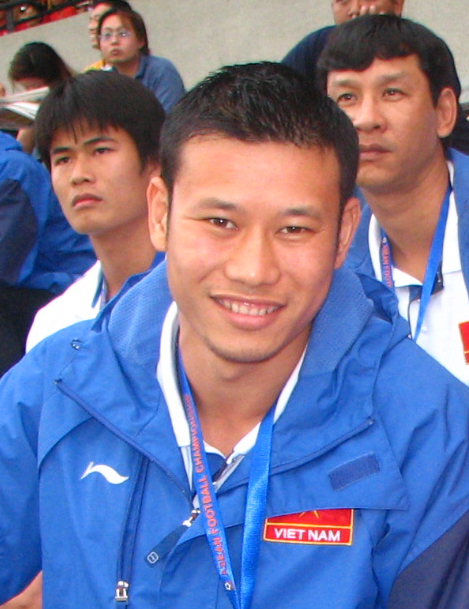

Personal information
- Full name: Thạch Bảo Khanh
- Date of birth: April 25, 1979 (age 47)
- Place of birth: Tây Hồ, Hanoi, Vietnam
- Height: 1.73 m (5 ft 8 in)
- Positions: Winger; second striker

Youth career
- 1992–1997: Thể Công

Senior career*
Years	Team	Apps	(Gls)
1998–2009	Thể Công	233	(36)
2009–2010	Lam Sơn Thanh Hóa	24	(12)
2010–2014	Hà Nội	32	(10)
Total		289	(58)

International career
1998–2006	Vietnam U23	12	(4)
2002–2008	Vietnam	22	(6)

Managerial career
- 2022: Công An Nhân Dân
- 2022–2023: Viettel
- 2023: The Cong-Viettel (technical director)
- * Club domestic league appearances and goals

Thạch Bảo Khanh (born April 25, 1979) is the retired Vietnamese footballer. He is a member of Vietnam national football team since 2002. He last being a technical director of V.League 1 club The Cong-Viettel in 2023. He is best known for his performance at 2004 Tiger Cup even though Vietnam was relegated from the group-stage.

== International goal ==
#	Date	Venue	Opponent	Score	Result	Competition
1.	August 20, 2004	Ho Chi Minh City, Vietnam	Myanmar	5-0	Won	Ho Chi Minh City Cup
2.	August 24, 2004	Ho Chi Minh City, Vietnam	India	2-1	Won	Ho Chi Minh City Cup
3.	December 7, 2004	Ho Chi Minh City, Vietnam	Singapore	1-1	Draw	2004 Tiger Cup
4.	December 9, 2004	Ho Chi Minh City, Vietnam	Cambodia	9-1	Won	2004 Tiger Cup
5.	December 9, 2004	Ho Chi Minh City, Vietnam	Cambodia	9-1	Won	2004 Tiger Cup
6.	December 15, 2004	Hanoi, Vietnam	Laos	3-0	Won	2004 Tiger Cup
