= Aung Kyaw Moe (footballer) =

Burmese footballer (born 1982)

Personal information
- Date of birth: July 2, 1982 (age 44)
- Place of birth: Mawlamyine, Myanmar
- Height: 1.68 m (5 ft 6 in)
- Position: Midfielder

Team information
- Current team: Yadanabon (manager)

Senior career*
| Years | Team | Apps | (Gls) |
| 1998–2008 | Finance and Revenue FC | 182 | (?) |
| 2009–2015 | Yadanabon | 118 | (?) |
| Total | | 300 | (?) |

International career
| 1999–2010 | Myanmar | 55 | (8) |

Managerial career
- 2014–2017: Yadanabon (assistant manager)
- 2018–: Yadanabon (Head Coach)
- * Club domestic league appearances and goals

Aung Kyaw Moe (Burmese: အောင်ကျော်မိုး; born 2 July 1982) is a professional football player from Myanmar. He plays for Yadanabon in the Myanmar National League and also for the Myanmar national team. He plays as a midfielder. He was Man of the Match for the MNL Cup Grand royal 2009.

== Career statistics ==
=== International ===
Scores and results list Myanmar's goal tally first, score column indicates score after each Aung goal.

List of international goals scored by Aung Kyaw Moe
| No. | Date | Venue | Opponent | Score | Result | Competition |
|---|---|---|---|---|---|---|
| 1 | 7 April 2000 | Dongdaemun Stadium, Seoul, South Korea | Laos | 2–0 | 4–0 | 2000 AFC Asian Cup qualification |
| 2 | 17 May 2002 | Thuwunna Stadium, Yangon, Myanmar | Malaysia | 1–0 | 1–1 | Friendly |
| 3 | 17 December 2002 | Gelora Bung Karno Stadium, Jakarta, Indonesia | Philippines | 1–0 | 6–1 | 2002 AFF Championship |
| 4 | 17 December 2002 | Gelora Bung Karno Stadium, Jakarta, Indonesia | Philippines | 4–0 | 6–1 | 2002 AFF Championship |
| 5 | 23 March 2003 | National Football Stadium, Malé, Maldives | Brunei | 2–0 | 5–0 | 2004 AFC Asian Cup qualification |
| 6 | 2 January 2005 | National Stadium, Kallang, Singapore | Singapore | 2–0 | 2–4 | 2004 AFF Championship |
| 7 | 18 November 2008 | Thuwunna Stadium, Yangon, Myanmar | Malaysia | 4–1 | 4–1 | 2008 Myanmar Grand Royal Challenge Cup |
| 8 | 2 December 2010 | Mỹ Đình National Stadium, Hanoi, Vietnam | Vietnam | 1–1 | 1–7 | 2010 AFF Championship |
