= Khin Maung Lwin =

Burmese footballer

Khin Maung Lwin gyi
Personal information
- Date of birth: 27 December 1988 (age 37)
- Place of birth: Lanmadaw Township, Rangoon, Burma
- Height: 1.70 m (5 ft 7 in)
- Position: Defender

Team information
- Current team: Yangon United FC
- Number: 17

Youth career
- 2004–2007: Kanbawza FC

Senior career*
Years	Team	Apps	(Gls)
2007–2010	Kanbawza FC	67	(2)
2010–2017	Yangon United FC	154	(5)

International career^{‡}
2006–2017	Myanmar	66	(4)
- * Club domestic league appearances and goals ‡ National team caps and goals as of 8 October 2016

Khin Maung Lwin (Burmese: ခင်မောင်လွင်; born 27 December 1988) is a Burmese footballer.

He is the former captain of the Myanmar.

== International ==
In 2007, he represented the Myanmar U-23s team in the final of 2007 SEA Games, losing to Thailand.
