= Agu Casmir =

Footballer (born 1984)

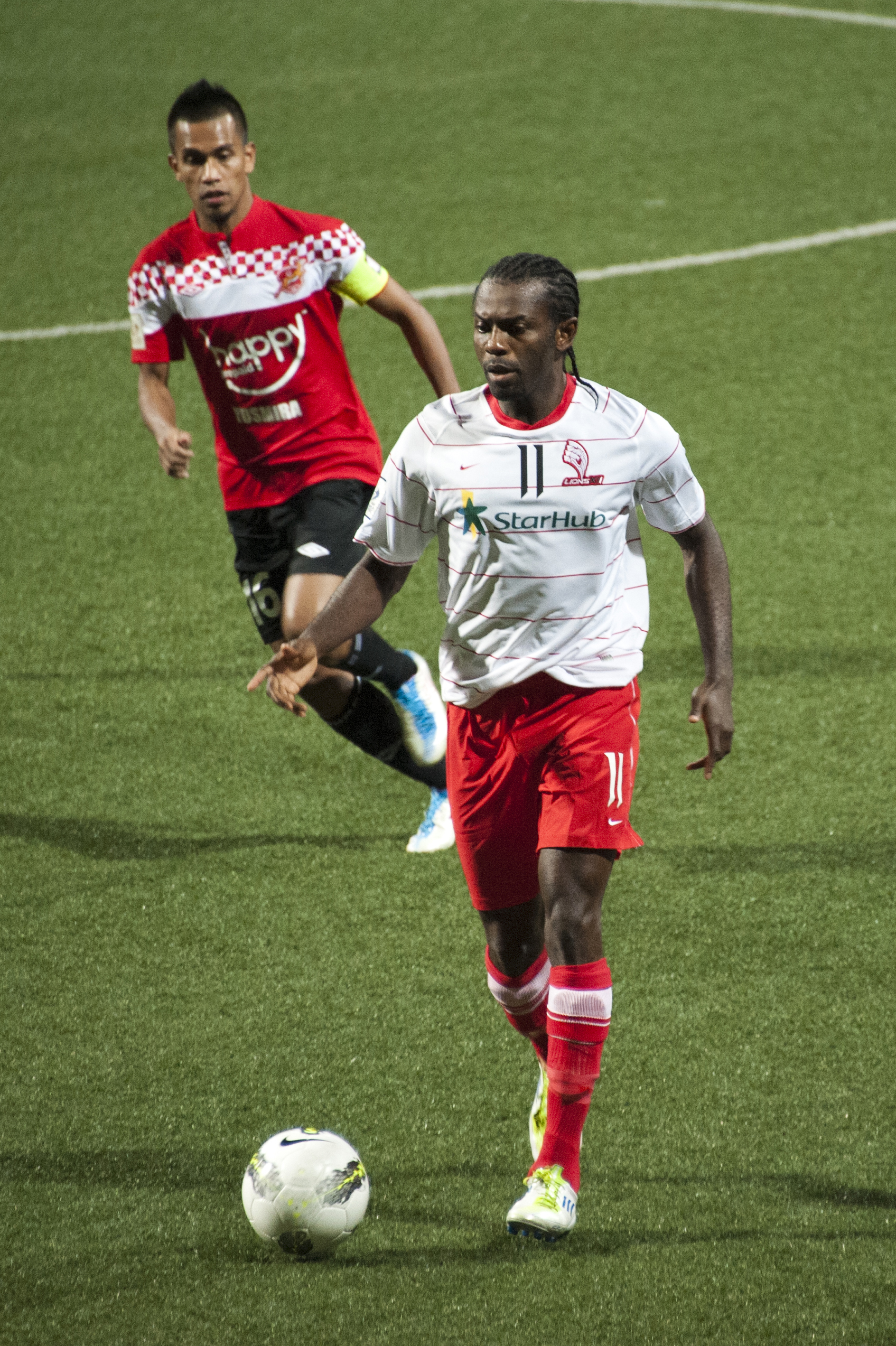
- Casmir playing for LionsXII in 2013

Personal information
- Date of birth: 23 March 1984 (age 42)
- Place of birth: Lagos, Nigeria
- Height: 1.80 m (5 ft 11 in)
- Position: Striker

Senior career*
Years	Team	Apps	(Gls)
2002–2003	Woodlands Wellington	53	(41)
2004–2005	Young Lions	34	(31)
2006	Woodlands Wellington	30	(14)
2007	Gombak United	26	(11)
2008	PDRM	3	(1)
2008–2010	Gombak United	57	(23)
2010–2011	Persija Jakarta	21	(9)
2012	LionsXII	14	(5)
2013	Bhayangkara	6	(2)
2014–2015	Warriors	12	(5)
Total		256	(142)

International career
2003–2007	Singapore U23		
2004–2012	Singapore	37	(13)
- * Club domestic league appearances and goals

Agu Casmir (born 23 March 1984) is a former professional footballer who played as a striker or attacking midfielder. Born in Nigeria, he played for the Singapore national team.

He currently holds the record for the all-time goal scorer for Woodlands Wellington with 55 goals.

== Club career ==
Casmir previously played for S.League clubs Young Lions and Woodlands Wellington in Singapore's S.League.

=== Woodlands Wellington ===
Casmir burst onto the football scene with Woodlands Wellington in 2002, scoring a remarkable 27 goals as an 18-year-old. He followed that up with another 15 goals the next year.

=== Young Lions ===
In 2004 and 2005, Casmir played for Young Lions where he scored a total of 31 goals.

=== Return to Woodlands Wellington ===
Casmir returned to Woodlands Wellington in 2006 and scored 17 goals.

=== Gombak United ===
Casmir then joined Gombak United at the start of the current 2007 S.League season.

On 19 September 2007, Casmir's 86th-minute goal for the Gombak United, which cancelled out Home United FC Kone Hamed's 18th-minute opener, was his 100th in the S.League.

At the end of 2007, Gombak United decided not to renew Casmir's contract. Nevertheless, when the 2010 FIFA World Cup qualification match against Lebanon loomed, he trained with one of his former clubs, Young Lions, to keep his fitness at peak condition to be eligible for a call-up to the national team.

=== PDRM FA ===
Casmir did not play for most of 2008 due to being clubless, but in August 2008, Malaysian club PDRM FA signed him together with Noh Alam Shah. Controversially, he was released after just 3 games, without any goals to his name.

=== Return to Gombak United ===
Gombak United again re-signed him in 2009 following his release from PDRM FA.

=== Persija Jakarta ===
In October 2010, Casmir joined Persija Jakarta in the Indonesian Super League where he spent the 2011 season playing for the club.

=== LionsXII ===
On 5 December 2011, it was announced that Casmir would be joining the LionsXII team that would be making their debut in the Malaysian Super League for the 2012 season.

=== Bhayangkara F.C. ===
Not retained on the LionsXII squad for 2013, Casmir was left without a club for a year until he signed with Indonesian club Bhayangkara F.C. in January 2013.

=== Warriors FC ===
In June 2014, Casmir returned to Singapore to sign with S.League club Warriors FC, taking jersey number 22. He retired at the end of the 2015 season.

== International career ==
Born in Nigeria, Casmir was offered Singapore citizenship via the Foreign Sports Talent Scheme in 2004. He was a member of the Singapore national team, which won the 2004 AFF Championship title.

Casmir was part of the national football team for the 2005 Southeast Asian Games (SEA Games) held at the Philippines. Singapore failed to advance beyond the group stage, with Casmir failing to score a goal. He was also part of the team for the 2007 SEA Games where Singapore won the bronze medal.

Casmir's impressive displays in the tail-end of 2008 earned him a national call-up for the 2008 AFF Championship. He scored a last-minute goal for Singapore against Myanmar to allow Singapore to earn three points at the 2010 AFF Championship, but they were still unable to progress to the next round.

== Controversy ==
In 2006, it was reported that Casmir signed a contract with Indonesian football club Persija Jakarta and that he took a signing-on fee of US$20,000. However, he did not sign with Persija Jakarta on 17 January, claiming to be attending football trials with a Russian club and the club subsequently sought repayment of the fee from his agent, ex-footballer Jules Onana. It was subsequently reported that Casmir had left his residence in Toa Payoh with his belongings on 19 January.

It was consequently reported on 19 February 2006 in The Straits Times that Casmir had purportedly been in Canada and had no intention of further pursuing a career in football. The report quoted Casmir's ex-manager, R. Vengadasalam, as saying that Casmir was disillusioned with football and had no intention of returning to Singapore. He had taken the contract to prove that he could still command a large annual fee (reported at US$80,000).

After a few weeks, reports emerged that Casmir wanted to return to play football in Singapore. Several football clubs including Gombak United had expressed interest in inviting him to play for their team, before he re-signed for former club Woodlands Wellington on a one-year contract, under a deal in which the club would re-pay Persija Jakarta his signing-on fee. The Football Association of Singapore suspended Casmir from the national squad for a year and fined him S$20,000 for his actions involving Persija Jakarta.

== Career statistics ==
#	Date	Venue	Opponent	Score	Result	Competition
1.	13 December 2004	Hanoi, Vietnam	Laos	3–1	6–2 (Won)	2004 Tiger Cup
2.	13 December 2004	Hanoi, Vietnam	Laos	6–2	6–2 (Won)	2004 Tiger Cup
3.	29 December 2004	Kuala Lumpur, Malaysia	Myanmar	2–1	4–3 (Won)	2004 Tiger Cup
4.	2 January 2005	Singapore	Myanmar	4–2	4–2 (Won)	2004 Tiger Cup
5.	8 January 2005	Jakarta, Indonesia	Indonesia	3–0	3–1 (Won)	2004 Tiger Cup
6.	16 January 2005	Singapore	Indonesia	2–0	2–1 (Won)	2004 Tiger Cup
7.	4 October 2007	Manama, Bahrain	Bahrain	1–0	1–0 (Lost)	Friendly
8.	5 December 2008	Jakarta, Indonesia	Cambodia	1–0	5–0 (Won)	2008 AFF Suzuki Cup
9.	5 December 2008	Jakarta, Indonesia	Cambodia	4–0	5–0 (Won)	2008 AFF Suzuki Cup
10.	7 December 2008	Jakarta, Indonesia	Myanmar	2–0	3–1 (Won)	2008 AFF Suzuki Cup
11.	7 December 2008	Jakarta, Indonesia	Myanmar	3–1	3–1 (Won)	2008 AFF Suzuki Cup
12.	26 November 2010	Jurong, Singapore	Laos	2–0	4–0 (Won)	Friendly
13.	26 November 2010	Jurong, Singapore	Laos	4–0	4–0 (Won)	Friendly
14.	5 December 2010	Hanoi, Vietnam	Myanmar	2–1	2–1 (Won)	2010 AFF Suzuki Cup

== Honours ==
=== Club ===
Gombak United

- Singapore League Cup: 2008

=== International ===
Singapore

- ASEAN Football Championship: 2004
- Southeast Asian Games: Bronze Medal – 2007

=== Individual ===
- 100 S.League Goals: 2007
