= Zaw Linn Tun =

Burmese footballer

Personal information
- Full name: Zaw Linn Tun
- Date of birth: 17 June 1983 (age 43)
- Place of birth: Tanintharyi, Burma
- Height: 1.78 m (5 ft 10 in)
- Position: Defender

Senior career*
Years	Team	Apps	(Gls)
2004–2009	Ministry of Home Affairs	90	(?)
2009–2014	Zeyashwemye	141	(?)
2015	Yadanarbon	26	(?)

International career
- Myanmar U23
2004–2015	Myanmar	28	(2)

Managerial career
- 2015–: Sagaing United
- * Club domestic league appearances and goals

Zaw Linn Tun, also called Zaw Lynn Tun (born 23 March 1983) is a Burmese footballer. He plays for club Yadanarbon in Myanmar National League as a defender. He was called to Myanmar national football team at the 2010 AFF Suzuki Cup and 2014 FIFA World Cup qualifiers.
