= Min Thu (footballer) =

Burmese footballer

Personal information
- Full name: Min Thu
- Date of birth: 2 June 1977 (age 49)
- Height: 1.68 m (5 ft 6 in)
- Position: Defender

Team information
- Current team: Shan United (manager)

Youth career
- 1996: ISPE

Senior career*
Years	Team	Apps	(Gls)
2005–2009	Ministry of Commerce FC		
2010–2013	Zeya Shwe Myay		

International career^{‡}
1998–2008	Myanmar	55	(1)

Managerial career
- 2017: Shan United U-19
- 2018: Shan United U-21
- 2019: Shan United
- * Club domestic league appearances and goals as of 1 December 2018 ‡ National team caps and goals as of 2 October 2012

Min Thu (Burmese: မင်းသူ; born 5 April 1977) is a retired footballer from Myanmar who played as a defender for Myanmar national football team.
