= Typhoon Kajiki (2025) =

Pacific typhoon in 2025

Typhoon Kajiki (Isang)
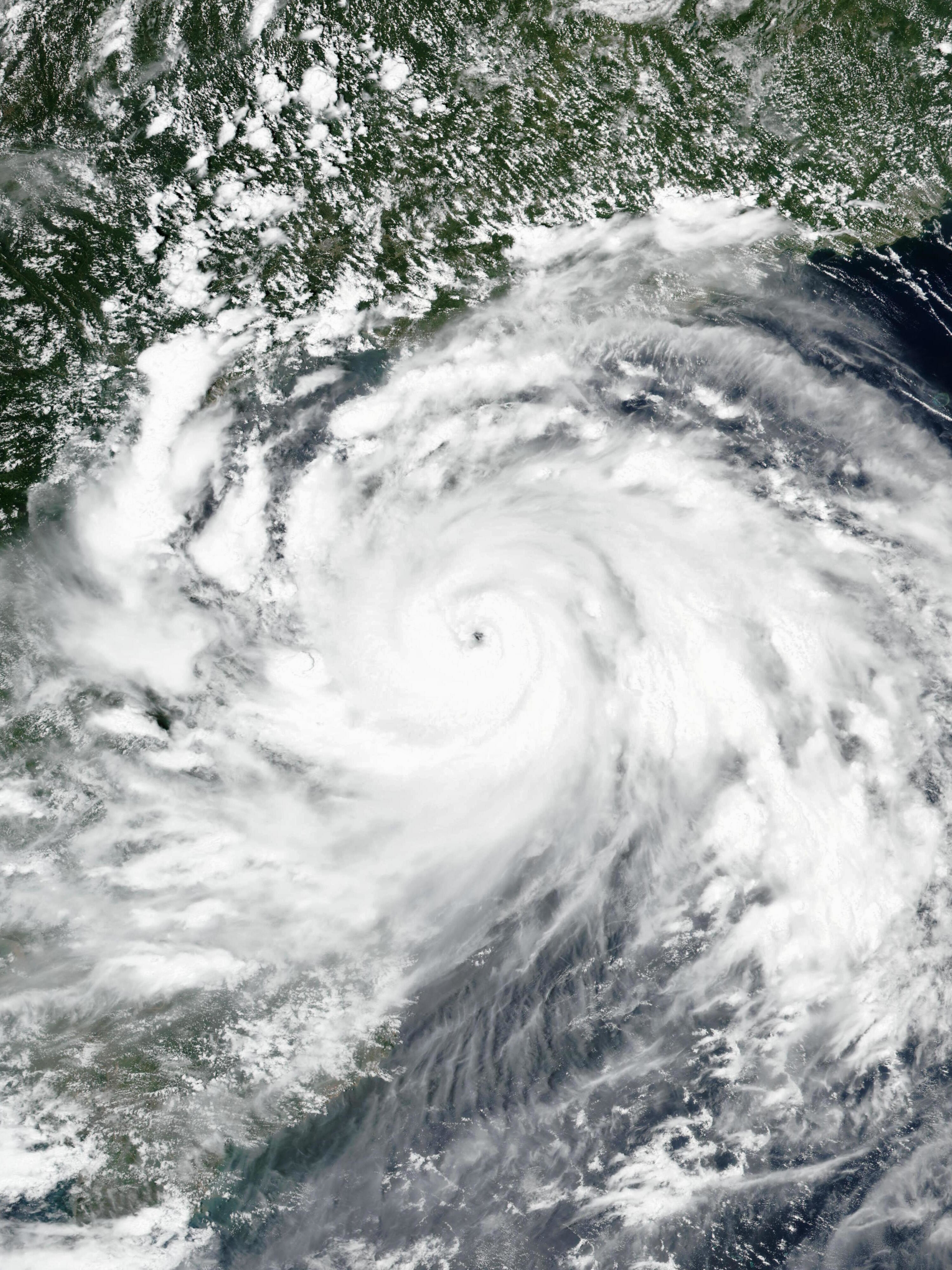
- Kajiki at peak intensity while approaching Hainan on August 24

Meteorological history
- Formed: August 22, 2025
- Dissipated: August 26, 2025

Typhoon
- 10-minute sustained (JMA)
- Highest winds: 150 km/h (90 mph)
- Lowest pressure: 950 hPa (mbar); 28.05 inHg

Category 3-equivalent typhoon
- 1-minute sustained (SSHWS/JTWC)
- Highest winds: 185 km/h (115 mph)
- Lowest pressure: 959 hPa (mbar); 28.32 inHg

Overall effects
- Fatalities: 17
- Injuries: 86
- Missing: 8
- Damage: $386 million (2025 USD)
- Areas affected: Philippines, Hong Kong, Macau, China (Guangdong and Hainan), Vietnam, Laos, Cambodia, Thailand, Myanmar
- IBTrACS
- Part of the 2025 Pacific typhoon season

Typhoon Kajiki, (Note: The name Kajiki (Japanese: カジキ, [ka̠ʑikʲi]) was contributed by Japan and refers to the constellation Dorado, the swordfish, in Japanese.) known in the Philippines as Tropical Storm Isang and in Vietnam as Typhoon No. 5 of 2025, was a powerful tropical cyclone that impacted Northern Vietnam after skirting the southern portion of Hainan Island in late August 2025. The thirteenth named storm and fifth typhoon of the 2025 Pacific typhoon season, Kajiki originated from an area of low pressure east of the Philippines on August 22.

Kajiki made its first landfall over Casiguran, Aurora at 09:50 PHT (01:50 UTC) as a weak tropical depression. It slightly weakened as it crossed Quirino through Ifugao before emerging into the South China Sea on August 23. Kajiki intensified over the South China Sea, reaching one-minute sustained winds of up to 175 km/h (110 mph). Kajiki then skirted southern coast of Hainan, bringing strong winds and heavy rain to the island before making landfall between Nghệ An and Hà Tĩnh at around 18:00 ICT (11:00 UTC) on August 25. Moving westward through inland areas, the remnants of Kajiki later brought heavy rains and winds over Thailand and Myanmar before it eventually dissipated on the following day.

== Meteorological history ==
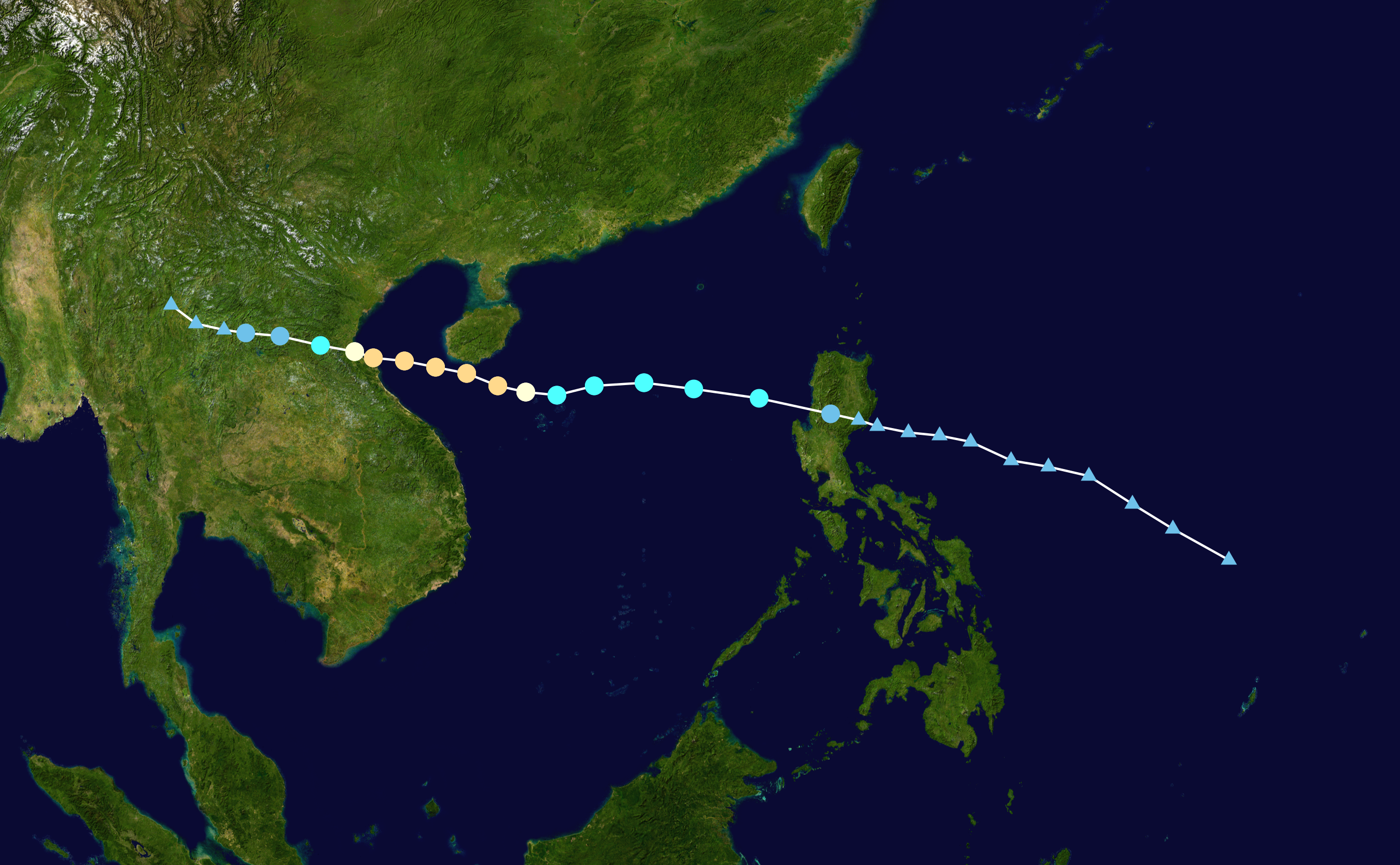
Map plotting the storm's track and intensity, according to the Saffir–Simpson scale Map key Saffir–Simpson scale Tropical depression (≤38 mph, ≤62 km/h) Tropical storm (39–73 mph, 63–118 km/h) Category 1 (74–95 mph, 119–153 km/h) Category 2 (96–110 mph, 154–177 km/h) Category 3 (111–129 mph, 178–208 km/h) Category 4 (130–156 mph, 209–251 km/h) Category 5 (≥157 mph, ≥252 km/h) Unknown Storm type Tropical cyclone Subtropical cyclone Extratropical cyclone, remnant low, tropical disturbance, or monsoon depression

On August 20, a low-pressure area entered the PAR east of southeastern Luzon. On August 22, the PAGASA upgraded the system, by then located east of Aurora, into a tropical depression and named it Isang. The JMA also classified the system as a tropical depression at 01:10 UTC, while the JTWC issued a Tropical Cyclone Formation Alert (TCFA), citing favorable conditions for development in the coming days. Later that day, Isang made landfall over Casiguran, Aurora at around 09:50 PHT (01:50 UTC). At 15:00 UTC, the JTWC upgraded the system to a tropical depression, designating it as 19W, as it entered the West Philippine Sea.

By 06:30 PHT on August 23 (22:30 UTC), Isang had emerged into the South China Sea, where it continued to intensify under highly favorable conditions, including low wind shear, warm sea surface temperatures, and southwestward upper-level diffluence. At 10:05 JST (01:05 UTC), 19W strengthened into a tropical storm and was named Kajiki by the JMA as it moved west-northwestward. However, while tracking east-northeast of Đà Nẵng, satellite imagery revealed that moderate 27–37 km/h (15–20 kn) vertical wind shear slightly hindered development, leaving the low-level circulation center (LLCC) partially exposed along the eastern edge of convection. Despite this, microwave imagery showed that deep convective banding wrapped into the circulation. At 21:50 JST (12:50 UTC), the JMA upgraded Kajiki to a severe tropical storm as it steadily intensified while moving westwards along the southern periphery of the subtropical high. Both the JMA and the JTWC upgraded the storm into a typhoon early the next day, with the latter classifying it as a Category 1-equivalent typhoon. The storm later developed a ragged eye, indicating that it underwent structural organization, which denoted a sign of intensification. Kajiki also depicted a well-defined LLCC, suggested that deep convection wrapped more tightly around the center. At 14:00 UTC, the JTWC upgraded Kajiki into a Category 2-equivalent typhoon, noting its compact core, with a 23-nautical-mile-wide (43 km; 26 mi) eye, skirting the southern coast of the island of Hainan. Afterwards, Kajiki slightly weakened, with satellite imagery depicted warming clouds along the western periphery of the typhoon, hinting a weakening trend as it neared the Gulf of Tonkin, where there was less ocean heat content. Kajiki later underwent an eyewall replacement cycle, indicating the beginning of its weakening, with a compact inner core, a calm band surrounding it, and a developing secondary eyewall. However, the system still has a strong poleward and equatorward outflow. Kajiki made landfall between Nghệ An and Hà Tĩnh around 18:00 ICT (11:00 UTC) on August 25. Afterwards, the JTWC issued its final warning at 15:00 UTC as it moved inland. The lowest sea-level pressure recorded in Vietnam during the typhoon's impact was 979.4 hPa at the Hà Tĩnh weather station at 17:59 ICT on August 25, and 989.2 hPa at Hòn Ngư Island [vi] at 18:00 ICT on August 25. Meanwhile, the JMA continued to track Kajiki as it traversed Vietnam as a depression until the system, reportedly, dissipated at 18:00 UTC on August 26.

== Preparations and impact ==
=== Philippines ===
As PAGASA started issuing advisories on Kajiki, Tropical Cyclone Wind Signal No. 1 warnings were issued over Abra, Apayao, Aurora, Benguet, Cagayan, Ifugao, Ilocos Norte, Ilocos Sur, Isabela, Kalinga, La Union, Mountain Province, Nueva Vizcaya, Pangasinan, Quirino, and the northern portion of Nueva Ecija. The agency also warned that gale-force winds were also expected for some provinces in Luzon. The Civil Aviation Authority of the Philippines (CAAP) reported several canceled domestic flights on August 22 due to the inclement weather caused by Kajiki. Classes in Metro Manila and some parts of Luzon were also suspended on the same day. Free rides on MRT Line 3, LRT Line 1 and Line 2 were announced shortly after the declaration of class suspensions in the city.

The storm, along with the southwest monsoon, caused extensive flooding in Metro Manila. Nearly 2,000 residents were evacuated from villages near the Mayon Volcano as heavy rains from the two weather systems were expected to trigger lahar flows and flash floods. Meanwhile, the Department of Social Welfare and Development (DSWD) reported that over 3,627 families were affected by the storm and distributed ₱1.6 million (US$32,487.31) worth of aid to those affected. The National Disaster Risk Reduction and Management Council (NDRRMC) reported that 50,678 people in different regions were affected by the storm and the contribution of southwest monsoon, with Bangsamoro being the most affected region. Two houses in the Cordillera Administrative Region and Soccsksargen were partially damaged due to the two weather systems. The NDRRMC had also distributed assistance worth ₱1.71 million (US$34,640.51) to the victims.

=== Hong Kong and Macau ===
In Hong Kong, the Hong Kong Observatory (HKO) issued Standby Signal No. 1 at 21:40 HKT (13:40 UTC) on August 22 and replaced it with the Strong Monsoon Signal at 12:10 HKT on August 24 (04:10 UTC). In Macau, Signal No. 1 was hoisted at 01:00 MST on August 23 (17:00 UTC) and lowered at 13:00 MST (05:00 UTC) on August 24.

=== China ===
In Hainan, a Level IV emergency response for flood and typhoon control was activated as strong winds and downpours are expected to hit its sea areas and islands. The National Meteorological Center of the China Meteorological Administration (CMA) also issued a yellow warning on August 23 in preparation for Kajiki. On August 24, the agency in Sanya raised the typhoon warning to red, citing that Kajiki had gained more strength as it approaches the island. As a result, all classes, work, public transport, and maritime travel were suspended, including the closure of tourist sites.

Although the typhoon did not make a direct landfall in Hainan, heavy rain and strong winds battered the island and nearby parts of Guangdong province. Xinhua News Agency said that more than 20,000 people were evacuated from hazardous areas while 30,769 fishing vessels were also docked ahead of the storm. The province also stockpiled emergency supplies and more than 2,800 emergency responders, with necessary vehicles and rescue equipment were also on standby in order to mitigate the potential impacts from the typhoon. Authorities had also advised the public to remain indoors and avoid coastal zones and temporary structures. Damage to the agricultural industry in Hainan Province reached 121 million yuan (US$17.53 million).

=== Vietnam ===
Authorities from Thanh Hóa to northern Quảng Trị raised the disaster risk as the storm neared the country. Vietnam carriers, such as Vietnam Airlines and Vietjet canceled dozens of flights ahead of the storm. More than 325,000 residents in some coastal provinces were planned to evacuate as Kajiki approached the country. Several coastal provinces also temporarily banned boats from leaving offshore on August 24. Three passenger trains of Vietnam Railways were suspended in preparation for the typhoon. Authorities also warned the public to stay indoors and the risk of flash floods and landslides. Tho Xuan Airport (Note: In Thanh Hóa Province) and Dong Hoi Airport (Note: Previously in Quảng Bình Province, now Quảng Trị Province) temporarily suspended operations on August 25 to ensure the safety of passengers, equipment, and facilities.

Sustained wind speeds of 96 km/h (60 mph) were recorded at Diễn Châu station, Nghệ An province. Kajiki caused one fatality, injured eight people, damaged or flooded 933 structures, uprooted 40,424 trees and affected 29,850 ha (73,800 acres) of crops in Hà Tĩnh province. There was also one fatality each in Ninh Bình and Nghệ An provinces. In Kim Hoa district‌, Hà Tĩnh province, one person was killed and another was seriously injured while repairing the roof of their home in preparation for the typhoon. Flooding at a hydropower plant killed one worker and left two civilians missing in Sa Pa, Lào Cai province. In total, Kajiki resulted in 47 injuries and left four individuals missing in Thanh Hóa, Tuyên Quang and Sơn La provinces. The widespread impact included 1.55 million people affected by power outages, 17 buildings destroyed, and damage to or flooding of 34,756 homes, 380 schools, 102 boats, 44 health facilities, and 72 other structures. Additionally, 239 landslides disrupted traffic, and more than 116,700 ha (288,000 acres) of crops across the country were affected. Damage in Nghệ An province exceeded ₫1.48 trillion (US$63.69 million). Damage in Hà Tĩnh province reached ₫2.9 trillion (US$125.22 million) and ₫358 billion (US$15.46 million) in Quảng Trị province. Total damage in Vietnam reached 9.25 trillion dong (US$368.2 million).

=== Elsewhere ===
In Khammouane province of Laos, heavy rainfall flooded eight villages. Flash floods also hit Xaysomboun province after several days of continuous rain, causing rivers to overflow and inundate homes and roads.

The remnants of Kajiki caused heavy rain and flash flooding in Northern Thailand. In Mae Suek, Chiang Mai Province, flooding and mudslides killed seven people, injured 24, left two others missing and damaged 57 homes. Flooding was also reported in the districts of Mae Chaem and Mae Hong Son.

In Myanmar, Kajiki produced heavy rains across the country, causing flooding in Tatkon Township, where hundreds of people were evacuated. In Pinlaung Township, Shan State, a landslide killed two people, injured 15 others and destroyed 15 homes.

== See also ==
- Weather of 2025
- Tropical cyclones in 2025
- Tropical cyclones in Vietnam
- Typhoon Damrey (2005) – A moderately strong and deadly typhoon that took a similar path
- Typhoon Ketsana (2009) – A devastating typhoon that caused widespread destruction across the Philippines and Vietnam; also took a comparable trajectory to Kajiki
- Typhoon Doksuri (2017) – A strong and damaging typhoon that also struck Northern Vietnam
- Typhoon Yagi (2024) – An extremely destructive and devastating typhoon that also struck Hainan and Northern Vietnam
- Tropical Storm Wipha (2025) – Affected the same areas as Kajiki a month earlier
