= Trần Anh Khoa =

Vietnamese footballer (1991–2024)

Personal information
- Date of birth: 28 July 1991
- Place of birth: Đà Nẵng, Vietnam
- Date of death: 4 December 2024 (aged 33)
- Place of death: Đà Nẵng, Vietnam
- Height: 1.60 m (5 ft 3 in)
- Position: Attacking midfielder

Youth career
- 2005–2012: SHB Đà Nẵng

Senior career*
Years	Team	Apps	(Gls)
2013–2015	SHB Đà Nẵng	22	(1)
- * Club domestic league appearances and goals

Trần Anh Khoa (28 July 1991 – 4 December 2024) was a Vietnamese footballer who played as an attacking midfielder.

== Career ==
Born in Đà Nẵng, Anh Khoa was a youth product of SHB Đà Nẵng. He was promoted to the first team in 2013, playing in the V.League 1. He made his debut for the team in the 2012 Vietnamese Super Cup final, coming in as a late substitute as his team won the title.

=== Injury and retirement ===
In a match of 2015 V.League 1 on 13 September 2015 between SHB Đà Nẵng and Sông Lam Nghệ An, Anh Khoa was dribbling into the box at the 21st minute when Quế Ngọc Hải committed a dangerous and reckless tackle to stop him. Ngọc Hải was only shown a yellow card by the referee but Anh Khoa had to be substituted and suffered serious injury to his knee ligaments and leg bone because of the tackle. Ngọc Hải was later suspended for six months for all football-related activities, and was ordered to pay the roughly 800 million đồng for Anh Khoa's medical expenses. Anh Khoa was expected to remain injured for 12 to 18 months and had to travel to Singapore for surgery. Doctors said that there was only a 50% chance of Anh Khoa recovering enough to play professional football again. After many operations, he retired from professional football in 2017.

After his retirement, Anh Khoa remained at SHB Đà Nẵng, coaching the team's youth categories.

== Personal life and death ==
Anh Khoa married his longtime girlfriend in 2018, but the couple later divorced.

Anh Khoa died by suicide at his home in Da Nang, on 4 December 2024, at the age of 33.

== Honours ==
SHB Đà Nẵng

- Vietnamese Super Cup: 2012
