= List of international goals scored by Lê Công Vinh =

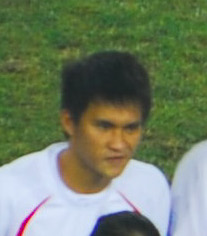
Lê Công Vinh is top goalscorer and most capped player for the Vietnam national football team.

Lê Công Vinh is a Vietnamese former professional footballer who played as a forward for the Vietnam national football team from 2004 to 2016. He scored 51 goals with the national team, making him the all-time top goalscorer for Vietnam. He was also the nation's most capped player, having appeared in 83 matches, until August 2026, when Nguyễn Quang Hải topped him with 84 caps. In June 2016 at the age of 30, Vinh announced he would retire at the conclusion of the 2016 AFF Championship.

== International goals ==
Scores and results list Vietnam's goal tally first, score column indicates score after each Vinh goal.

Key
| ‡ | Indicates goal was scored from a penalty kick |

International goals scored by Lê Công Vinh
| No. | Cap | Date | Venue | Opponent | Score | Result | Competition | Ref. |
|---|---|---|---|---|---|---|---|---|
| 1 | 2 | 20 August 2004 | Thống Nhất Stadium, Ho Chi Minh City, Vietnam | Myanmar | 1–0‡ | 5–0 | 2004 LG Cup | |
| 2 | 2 | 20 August 2004 | Thống Nhất Stadium, Ho Chi Minh City, Vietnam | Myanmar | 5–0 | 5–0 | 2004 LG Cup | |
| 3 | 3 | 24 August 2004 | Thống Nhất Stadium, Ho Chi Minh City, Vietnam | India | 1–0 | 2–1 | 2004 LG Cup | |
| 4 | 8 | 9 December 2004 | Thống Nhất Stadium, Ho Chi Minh City, Vietnam | Cambodia | 3–1 | 9–1 | 2004 AFF Championship | |
| 5 | 8 | 9 December 2004 | Thống Nhất Stadium, Ho Chi Minh City, Vietnam | Cambodia | 8–1 | 9–1 | 2004 AFF Championship | |
| 6 | 8 | 9 December 2004 | Thống Nhất Stadium, Ho Chi Minh City, Vietnam | Cambodia | 9–1 | 9–1 | 2004 AFF Championship | |
| 7 | 10 | 15 December 2004 | Mỹ Đình National Stadium, Hanoi, Vietnam | Laos | 1–0 | 3–0 | 2004 AFF Championship | |
| 8 | 12 | 26 December 2006 | Suphachalasai Stadium, Bangkok, Thailand | Kazakhstan | 2–1 | 2–1 | 2006 King's Cup | |
| 9 | 13 | 28 December 2006 | Suphachalasai Stadium, Bangkok, Thailand | Singapore | 3–2 | 3–2 | 2006 King's Cup | |
| 10 | 16 | 17 January 2007 | Jalan Besar Stadium, Kallang, Singapore | Laos | 1–0 | 9–0 | 2007 AFF Championship | |
| 11 | 16 | 17 January 2007 | Jalan Besar Stadium, Kallang, Singapore | Laos | 2–0 | 9–0 | 2007 AFF Championship | |
| 12 | 16 | 17 January 2007 | Jalan Besar Stadium, Kallang, Singapore | Laos | 5–0 | 9–0 | 2007 AFF Championship | |
| 13 | 19 | 24 June 2007 | Mỹ Đình National Stadium, Hanoi, Vietnam | Jamaica | 1–0 | 3–0 | Friendly | |
| 14 | 20 | 30 June 2007 | Mỹ Đình National Stadium, Hanoi, Vietnam | Bahrain | 1–1 | 5–3 | Friendly | |
| 15 | 20 | 30 June 2007 | Mỹ Đình National Stadium, Hanoi, Vietnam | Bahrain | 2–1 | 5–3 | Friendly | |
| 16 | 21 | 8 July 2007 | Mỹ Đình National Stadium, Hanoi, Vietnam | United Arab Emirates | 1–0 | 2–0 | 2007 AFC Asian Cup | |
| 17 | 27 | 1 October 2008 | Thống Nhất Stadium, Ho Chi Minh City, Vietnam | Myanmar | 1–1 | 2–3 | 2008 Ho Chi Minh City International Football Tournament | |
| 18 | 27 | 1 October 2008 | Thống Nhất Stadium, Ho Chi Minh City, Vietnam | Myanmar | 2–3 | 2–3 | 2008 Ho Chi Minh City International Football Tournament | |
| 19 | 28 | 5 October 2008 | Thống Nhất Stadium, Ho Chi Minh City, Vietnam | Turkmenistan | 2–3 | 2–3 | 2008 Ho Chi Minh City International Football Tournament | |
| 20 | 32 | 26 November 2008 | Jurong East Stadium, Jurong East, Singapore | Singapore | 1–1 | 2–2 (4–5 pen.) | Friendly (Note: This match is not recognised by FIFA as a full international.) | |
| 21 | 38 | 24 December 2008 | Rajamangala Stadium, Bangkok, Thailand | Thailand | 2–0 | 2–1 | 2008 AFF Championship | |
| 22 | 39 | 28 December 2008 | Mỹ Đình National Stadium, Hanoi, Vietnam | Thailand | 1–1 | 1–1 | 2008 AFF Championship | |
| 23 | 40 | 14 January 2009 | Mỹ Đình National Stadium, Hanoi, Vietnam | Lebanon | 2–0 | 3–1 | 2011 AFC Asian Cup qualification | |
| 24 | 43 | 17 January 2010 | Mỹ Đình National Stadium, Hanoi, Vietnam | China | 1–2‡ | 1–2 | 2011 AFC Asian Cup qualification | |
| 25 | 44 | 29 June 2011 | Thống Nhất Stadium, Ho Chi Minh City, Vietnam | Macau | 1–0 | 6–0 | 2014 FIFA World Cup qualification (AFC) | |
| 26 | 44 | 29 June 2011 | Thống Nhất Stadium, Ho Chi Minh City, Vietnam | Macau | 2–0 | 6–0 | 2014 FIFA World Cup qualification (AFC) | |
| 27 | 44 | 29 June 2011 | Thống Nhất Stadium, Ho Chi Minh City, Vietnam | Macau | 3–0‡ | 6–0 | 2014 FIFA World Cup qualification (AFC) | |
| 28 | 45 | 3 July 2011 | Estádio Campo Desportivo, Macau | Macau | 3–0 | 7–1 | 2014 FIFA World Cup qualification (AFC) | (Note: News articles after the match originally attributed five goals to Vinh. Retrospective and updated sources attribute four goals to Vinh and instead credit the first goal of the match to Huỳnh Quang Thanh.) |
| 29 | 45 | 3 July 2011 | Estádio Campo Desportivo, Macau | Macau | 4–0 | 7–1 | 2014 FIFA World Cup qualification (AFC) | (Note: News articles after the match originally attributed five goals to Vinh. Retrospective and updated sources attribute four goals to Vinh and instead credit the first goal of the match to Huỳnh Quang Thanh.) |
| 30 | 45 | 3 July 2011 | Estádio Campo Desportivo, Macau | Macau | 5–1 | 7–1 | 2014 FIFA World Cup qualification (AFC) | (Note: News articles after the match originally attributed five goals to Vinh. Retrospective and updated sources attribute four goals to Vinh and instead credit the first goal of the match to Huỳnh Quang Thanh.) |
| 31 | 45 | 3 July 2011 | Estádio Campo Desportivo, Macau | Macau | 6–1‡ | 7–1 | 2014 FIFA World Cup qualification (AFC) | (Note: News articles after the match originally attributed five goals to Vinh. Retrospective and updated sources attribute four goals to Vinh and instead credit the first goal of the match to Huỳnh Quang Thanh.) |
| 32 | 52 | 11 September 2012 | Shah Alam Stadium, Shah Alam, Malaysia | Malaysia | 1–0 | 2–0 | Friendly | |
| 33 | 57 | 2 July 2014 | Gò Đậu Stadium, Thủ Dầu Một, Vietnam | Myanmar | 3–0 | 6–0 | Friendly | |
| 34 | 57 | 2 July 2014 | Gò Đậu Stadium, Thủ Dầu Một, Vietnam | Myanmar | 4–0 | 6–0 | Friendly | |
| 35 | 57 | 2 July 2014 | Gò Đậu Stadium, Thủ Dầu Một, Vietnam | Myanmar | 5–0 | 6–0 | Friendly | |
| 36 | 58 | 6 September 2014 | Lạch Tray Stadium, Haiphong, Vietnam | Hong Kong | 3–1 | 3–1 | Friendly | |
| 37 | 61 | 22 November 2014 | Mỹ Đình National Stadium, Hanoi, Vietnam | Indonesia | 2–1 | 2–2 | 2014 AFF Championship | |
| 38 | 62 | 25 November 2014 | Mỹ Đình National Stadium, Hanoi, Vietnam | Laos | 2–0 | 3–0 | 2014 AFF Championship | |
| 39 | 65 | 11 December 2014 | Mỹ Đình National Stadium, Hanoi, Vietnam | Malaysia | 1–2‡ | 2–4 | 2014 AFF Championship | |
| 40 | 65 | 11 December 2014 | Mỹ Đình National Stadium, Hanoi, Vietnam | Malaysia | 2–4 | 2–4 | 2014 AFF Championship | |
| 41 | 69 | 8 October 2015 | Mỹ Đình National Stadium, Hanoi, Vietnam | Iraq | 1–0 | 1–1 | 2018 FIFA World Cup qualification (AFC) | |
| 42 | 71 | 24 March 2016 | Mỹ Đình National Stadium, Hanoi, Vietnam | Chinese Taipei | 1–1 | 4–1 | 2018 FIFA World Cup qualification (AFC) | |
| 43 | 71 | 24 March 2016 | Mỹ Đình National Stadium, Hanoi, Vietnam | Chinese Taipei | 4–1 | 4–1 | 2018 FIFA World Cup qualification (AFC) | |
| 44 | 73 | 31 May 2016 | Mỹ Đình National Stadium, Hanoi, Vietnam | Syria | 1–0 | 2–0 | Friendly | |
| 45 | 74 | 3 June 2016 | Thuwunna Stadium, Yangon, Myanmar | Hong Kong | 1–1 | 2–2 (4–3 pen.) | 2016 AYA Bank Cup | |
| 46 | 74 | 3 June 2016 | Thuwunna Stadium, Yangon, Myanmar | Hong Kong | 2–1 | 2–2 (4–3 pen.) | 2016 AYA Bank Cup | |
| 47 | 75 | 6 June 2016 | Thuwunna Stadium, Yangon, Myanmar | Singapore | 1–0 | 3–0 (a.e.t.) | 2016 AYA Bank Cup | |
| 48 | 76 | 6 October 2016 | Thống Nhất Stadium, Ho Chi Minh City, Vietnam | North Korea | 2–1 | 5–2 | Friendly | |
| 49 | 78 | 8 November 2016 | Mỹ Đình National Stadium, Hanoi, Vietnam | Indonesia | 1–1 | 3–2 | Friendly | |
| 50 | 79 | 20 November 2016 | Thuwunna Stadium, Yangon, Myanmar | Myanmar | 2–1 | 2–1 | 2016 AFF Championship | |
| 51 | 81 | 26 November 2016 | Wunna Theikdi Stadium, Naypyidaw, Myanmar | Cambodia | 1–0 | 2–1 | 2016 AFF Championship | |

== International statistics ==
Caps and goals by year
| Year | Caps | Goals |
|---|---|---|
| 2004 | 10 | 7 |
| 2005 | 0 | 0 |
| 2006 | 3 | 2 |
| 2007 | 13 | 7 |
| 2008 | 13 | 6 |
| 2009 | 3 | 1 |
| 2010 | 1 | 1 |
| 2011 | 5 | 7 |
| 2012 | 7 | 1 |
| 2013 | 1 | 0 |
| 2014 | 9 | 8 |
| 2015 | 5 | 1 |
| 2016 | 13 | 10 |
| Total | 83 | 51 |

Caps and goals by competition
| Competition | Caps | Goals |
|---|---|---|
| Friendlies (incl. minor invitational tournaments) | 30 | 23 |
| AFC Asian Cup | 4 | 1 |
| AFC Asian Cup qualifiers | 5 | 2 |
| FIFA World Cup qualification | 16 | 10 |
| AFF Championship | 28 | 15 |
| Total | 83 | 51 |

Caps and goals by opposition
| Opposition | Caps | Goals |
|---|---|---|
| Thailand | 9 | 2 |
| Singapore | 8 | 3 |
| Indonesia | 8 | 2 |
| Malaysia | 6 | 3 |
| Myanmar | 5 | 8 |
| Laos | 4 | 5 |
| Iraq | 3 | 1 |
| United Arab Emirates | 3 | 1 |
| North Korea | 3 | 1 |
| Qatar | 3 | 0 |
| Hong Kong | 3 | 3 |
| Syria | 3 | 1 |
| Japan | 2 | 0 |
| South Korea | 2 | 0 |
| Philippines | 2 | 0 |
| Cambodia | 2 | 4 |
| China | 2 | 1 |
| Lebanon | 2 | 1 |
| Macau | 2 | 7 |
| Chinese Taipei | 2 | 2 |
| Kazakhstan | 1 | 1 |
| Jamaica | 1 | 1 |
| Palestine | 1 | 0 |
| Uzbekistan | 1 | 0 |
| Turkmenistan | 1 | 1 |
| Bahrain | 1 | 2 |
| India | 1 | 1 |
| Mozambique | 1 | 0 |
| Maldives | 1 | 0 |
| Total | 108 | 52 |
