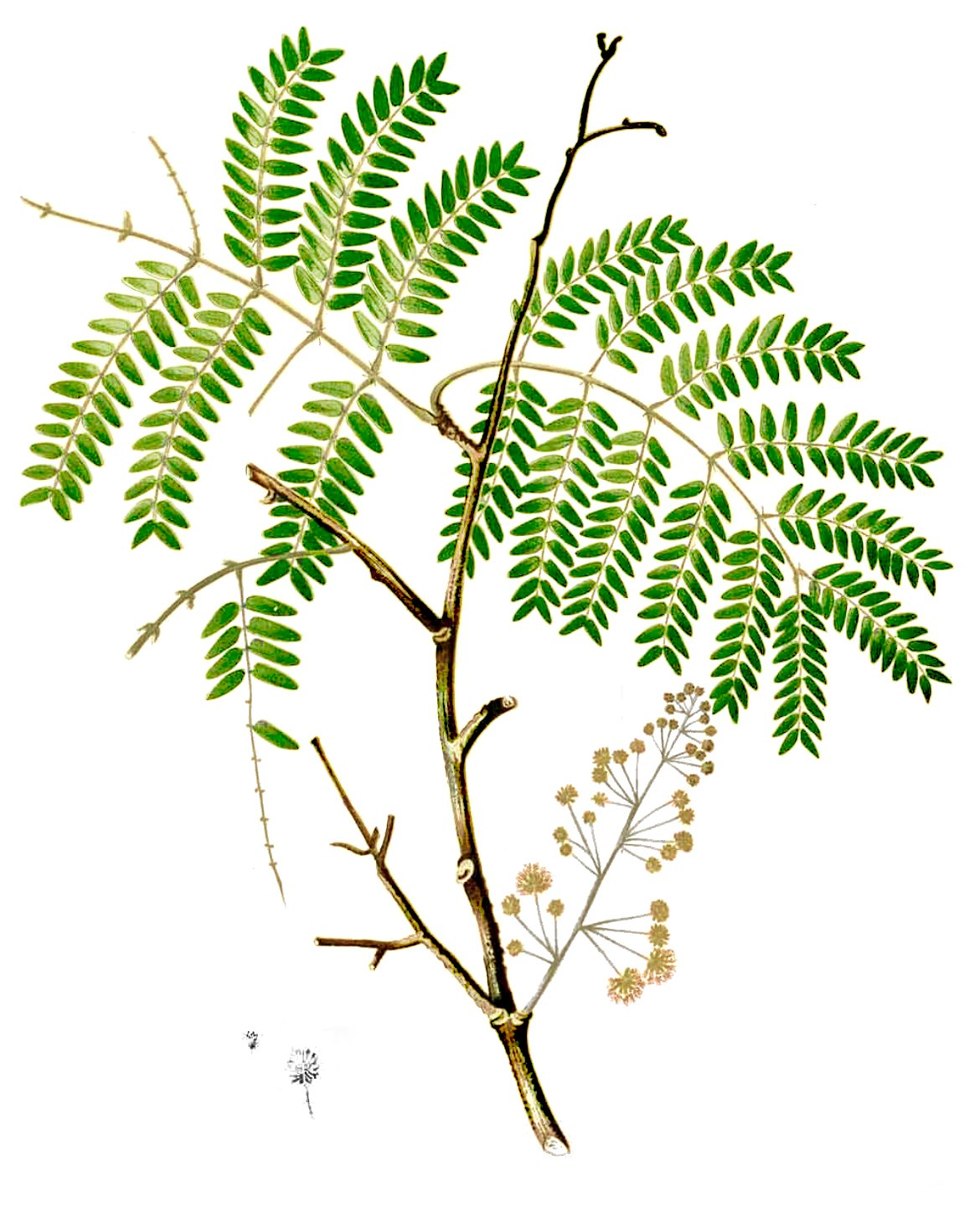

Scientific classification
- Kingdom: Plantae
- Clade: Embryophytes
- Clade: Tracheophytes
- Clade: Spermatophytes
- Clade: Angiosperms
- Clade: Eudicots
- Clade: Rosids
- Order: Fabales
- Family: Fabaceae
- Subfamily: Caesalpinioideae
- Clade: Mimosoid clade
- Genus: Senegalia
- Species: S. rugata

Binomial name
- Senegalia rugata (Lam.) Britton & Rose

Synonyms
- Acacia abstergens (Roxb. ex Spreng.) Steud.; Acacia concinna (Willd.) DC.; Acacia gamblei Bahadur & R.C.Gaur; Acacia habbasioides Bojer; Acacia hooperiana Zipp. ex Miq.; Acacia philippinarum Benth.; Acacia poilanei Gagnep.; Acacia polycephala DC.; Acacia quisumbingii Merr.; Acacia rugata (Lam.) Buch.-Ham. ex Voigt; Acacia rugata Buch.-Ham. ex Benth.; Acacia sinuata (Lour.) Merr.; Arthrosprion stipulatum Hassk.; Mimosa abstergens Roxb. ex Spreng.; Mimosa concinna Willd.; Mimosa rugata Lam.; Mimosa saponaria Roxb. ex Wight & Arn.; Mimosa sinuata Lour.; Mimosa tenuifolia Blanco

= Senegalia rugata =

Species of plant in the legume family

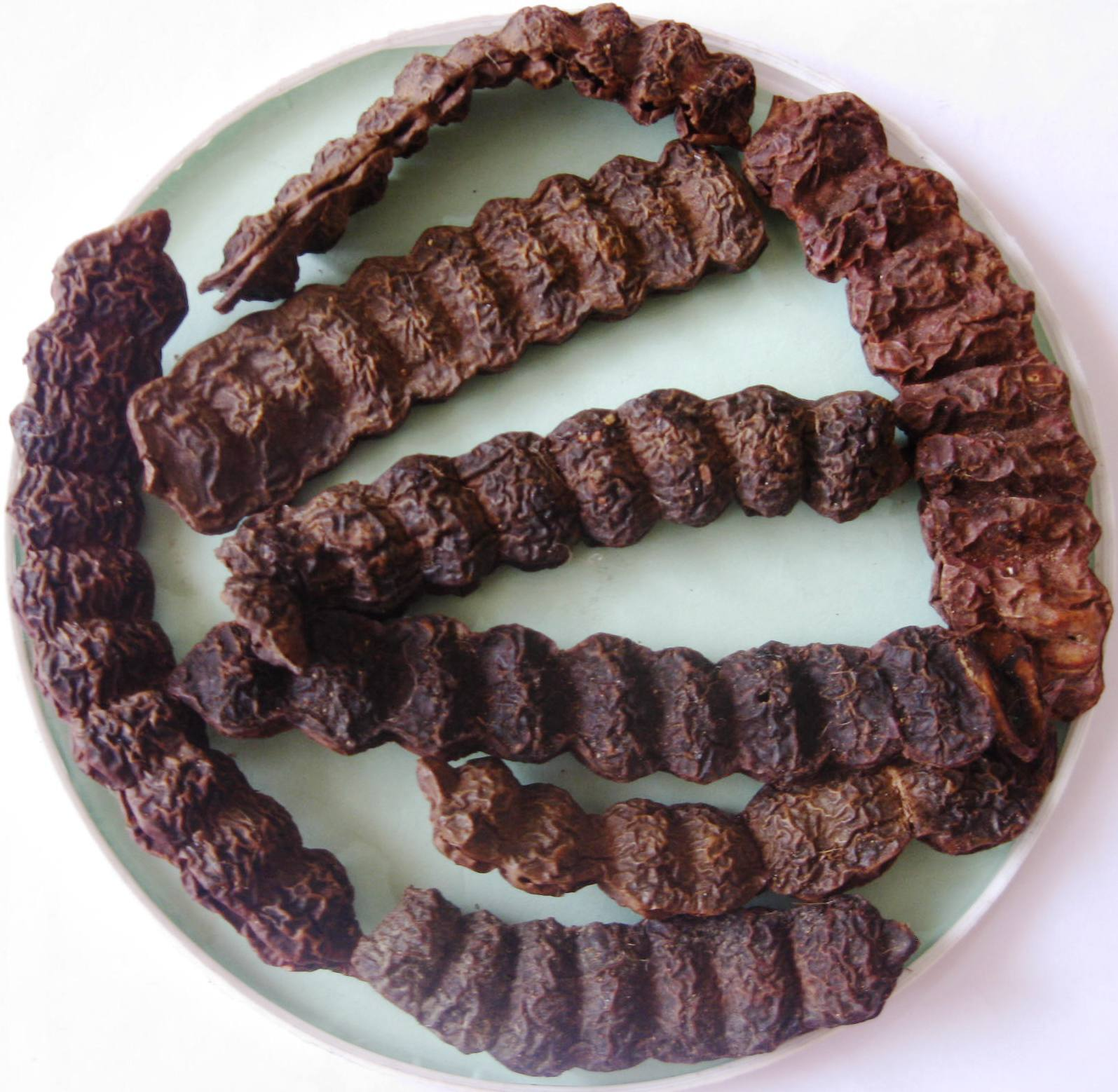
Shikakai (Senegalia rugata) seed pods

Senegalia rugata is a spiny climbing shrub native to China and tropical Asia, common in the warm plains of central and south India. It is renowned as a raw material for shampoo, and the leaves and young shoots are often eaten. Archaeobotanical evidence shows its use for hair care in the pre-Harrapan levels of Banawali, some 4500–4300 years ago.

== Description ==
A woody climber, shrub, or small tree up to 5 metres (16 ft) tall, with numerous spines. Leaves are bipinnate. Cream to pale-yellow flowers, though buds are red to purplish-red and when the flowers are open they appear cream. The seed pods are distinctive. When fresh, they are smooth, thick, and fleshy; however, when they dry, they become wrinkled, blackish, and very hard.

== Distribution ==
The species is native to Asia, including China. Countries and regions to which it is native include: Papua New Guinea (Eastern New Guinea); Indonesia (West Papua, Kai Islands, Sulawesi, Nusa Tenggara, Maluku, Jawa, Sumatera); Philippines; Malaysia (Peninsular Malaysia); Thailand; Cambodia; Vietnam; Zhōngguó/China (Guangdong, Yunnan); Laos; Myanmar; India (Andaman Islands, Assam), Bangladesh, Nepal, East Himalaya. It has been introduced/naturalized to the following countries/regions: Nouvelle Caledonie; Australia (Queensland); Japan (Okinawa); Réunion; Madagascar; Seychelles; Brazil (southeast); Jamaica

The species is invasive in countries around the world, including New Caledonia.

== Habitat and ecology ==
In the Philippines the plant occurs in low and medium elevation thickets. The species grows both in the forest and within villages in Chiang Mai Province, Thailand. S. rugata grows in forest or thickets in Zhōngguó/China, most commonly near watercourses in valleys, at an altitude of between 880 and 1,500 metres (2,890 and 4,920 ft).

The tree is food for the larvae of the butterfly Pantoporia hordonia.

== Archaeobotany ==
Pre-Harappan level of Banawali (2750–2500 BC), Haryana have revealed traces of a mixture of Shikakai with soap nuts and Amla (Indian Gooseberry), exhibiting ancient roots of South Asian hygiene.

== Vernacular names ==
- Burmese: ကင်ပွန်း; kinmun or kinbun
- Chinese: 紫荚金合欢; pinyin: zǐ jiá jīn hé huān; lit. 'purple-pod senegalia'
- Australian English: soap pod wattle
- Karen (Pang Hin Fon district): phu che sa or pa chi (Chiang Mai Province, Thailand)
- Khmer: ba:y dâmnaëb ('sticky rice', an allusion to its clingy thorns), bânla sâöt ('viscous spines'), sâmpöy, sândaèk kâmpöënh (evoking 'wild bean')
- Kannada: ಸೀಗೆಕಾಯಿ, Seegekaayi derived from Tamil word Sigaikaai (Sigai means Hair, Kaai means unrip fruit)
- Lawa language, Pang Hin Fon district, Chiang Mai, Thailand: kad ka ha
- Malayalam: ചേവക്ക കൈ, Chevakka kai Tamil: Sigaikaai
- Mon: ကပေါဝ်, romanized: kapow
- Tamil: Sigaikaai (Sigai means hair, Kaai means unripe fruit)
- Thai: ส้มขน som khon or ส้มป่อย som poi

== Uses ==
=== Shikakai in hair care ===
Senegalia rugata has been used traditionally for hair care in the Indian subcontinent since ancient times. It is one of the Ayurvedic medicinal plants. It is traditionally used as a shampoo and it is also added in synthetic Ayurvedic shampoos. It is widely known as shikakai, from Tamil சிகைக்காய் cikaikkāy (cikai 'hair'+kāy 'fruit'). In order to prepare it, the fruit pods, leaves and bark of the plant are dried, ground into a powder, then made into a paste. While this traditional shampoo does not produce the normal amount of lather that a sulfate-containing shampoo would, it is considered a good cleanser. It is mild, having a naturally low pH, and does not strip hair of natural oils. An infusion of the leaves has been used in anti-dandruff preparations.

Senagalia rugata extracts are used in natural shampoos or hair powders and the tree is now grown commercially in India and Far East Asia. The plant parts used for the dry powder or the extract are the bark, leaves or pods. The bark contains high levels of saponins, which are foaming agents found in several other plant species used as shampoos or soaps. Saponin-containing plants have a long history of use as mild cleaning agents. Saponins from the plant's pods have been traditionally used as a detergent, and in Bengal for poisoning fish; they are documented to be potent marine toxins.

In Myanmar, the fruit is mixed with the bark of the tayaw (Grewia) tree and sometimes lime to make the traditional tayaw kinpun shampoo. Shampooing with tayaw kinpun has been an important tradition in Burmese culture since ancient times. Burmese kings used to wash their hair with tayaw kinpun during the royal hair-washing ceremony (ခေါင်းဆေး မင်္ဂလာပွဲ), in the belief that using the shampoo would cast away bad luck and bring good luck. It remains customary for many Burmese people to wash their heads with tayaw kinpun, especially on the Burmese New Year's Day to leave behind impurities and bad omens of the past, and the shampoo is commonly sold in the country's open-air markets, typically in plastic bags.

=== Food, medicine, and other uses ===
This species is used in a variety of ways in Cambodia. The young leaves are included in salads. The fruit is used for washing hair and in local medicine. To treat abscesses, eczema and leprosy the fruit can also be used externally or as a laxative when they are taken internally. The pulp of the fruit, without the seeds, is used as a diuretic and emetic, while the seeds are reputed to make delivery in childbirth easier.

Traditional healers of Nakhon Nayok Province, Thailand, use the leaves of this species to treat irregular menstruation.

Amongst the Karen people of Chiang Mai Province, Thailand, the plant is one of the most widely used legumes. They use the fruit in a cold infusion both as soap and shampoo, and as a medicine for food poisoning. The dried fruit is used in holy water for the rituals to pay respect to elderly people and to evict wickedness.

Investigating plant use amongst both Karen and Lawa people living in Pang Hin Fon district (Chiang Mai), S. rugata was one of the plants that provided both food and health-products. The young shoots and leaves are cooked in a soup, the fruit are eaten raw or cooked, while the bark was chewed and kept as a quid in the mouth to counter-act toothache, and a decoction of the fruit was used as shampoo.

An infusion of the leaves of Senagalia rugata has also been used for therapy of jaundice in the traditional Indian medicine.

In Nepal, the plant is one of many that are processed and sold in the medicinal products industry. In 2004, an estimated 2,459 kilograms (5,421 lb) of material was purchased nationwide by the industry at an average price of 80 Nepalese rupees. Central wholesalers provided the raw material.

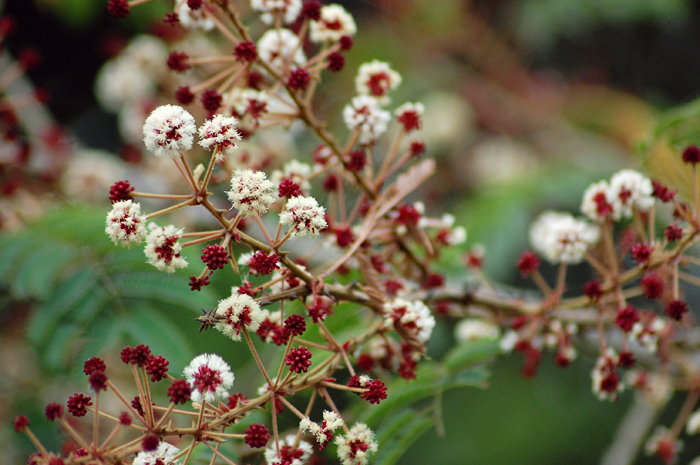
Flowers

The leaves have an acidic taste and are used in chutneys.

== Chemical constituents ==
Alkaloids are found in the tree's fruit. In commercial extracts, when the plant is hydrolyzed it yields lupeol, spinasterol, acacic acid, lactone, and the natural sugars glucose, arabinose and rhamnose. It also contains hexacosanol, spinasterone, oxalic acid, tartaric acid, citric acid, succinic acid, ascorbic acid, and the alkaloids calycotomine and nicotine.

== Gallery ==
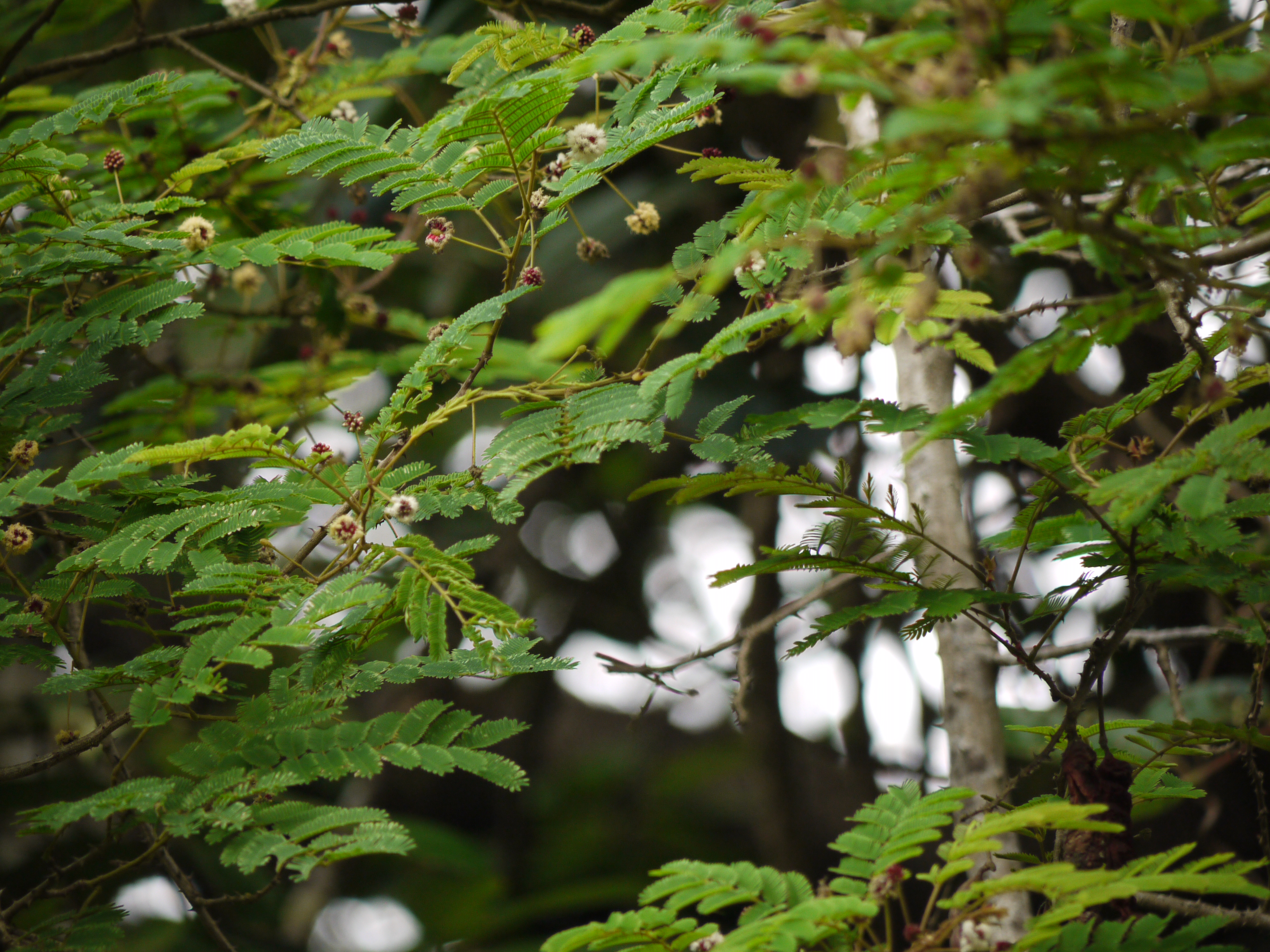

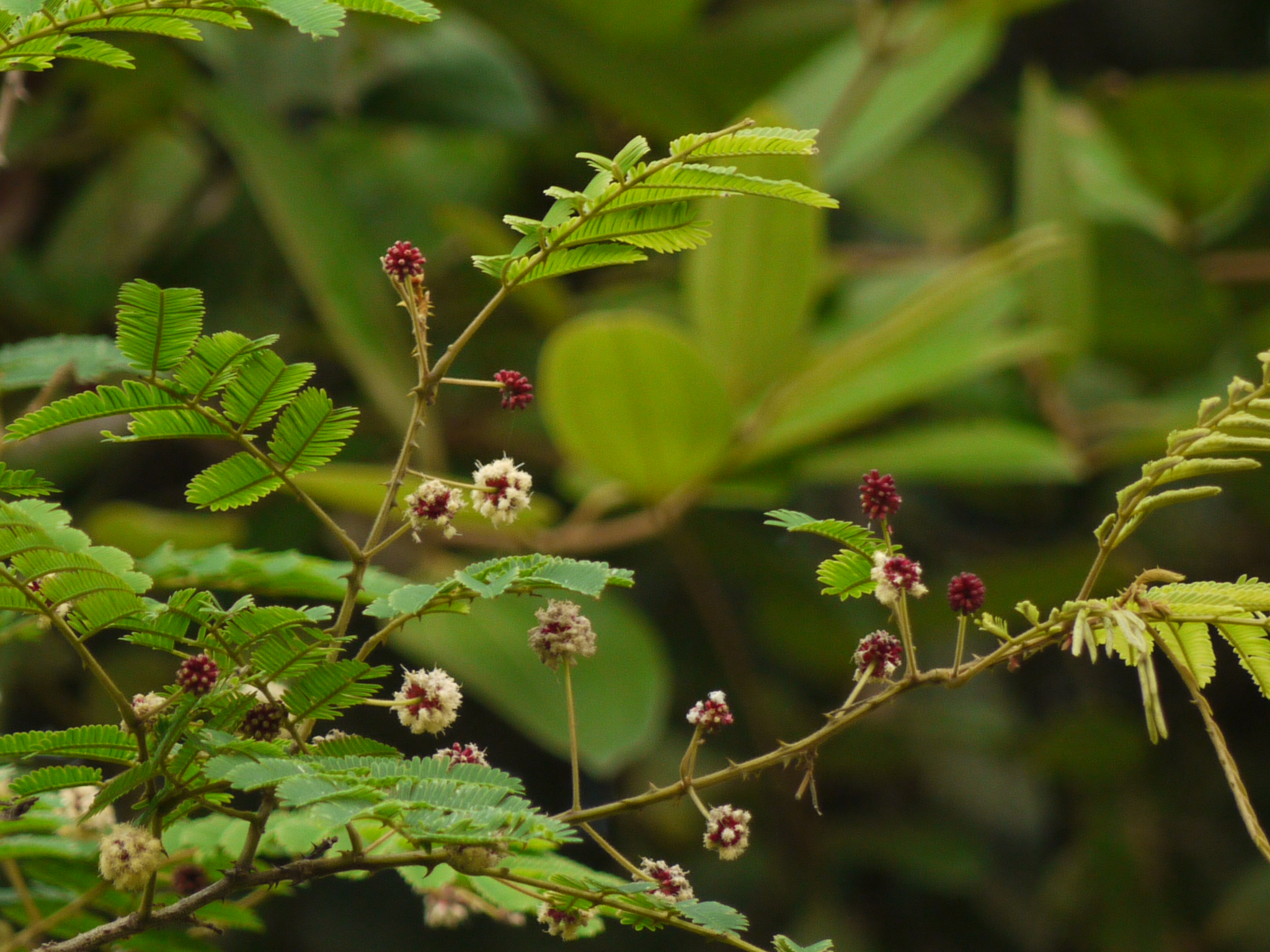

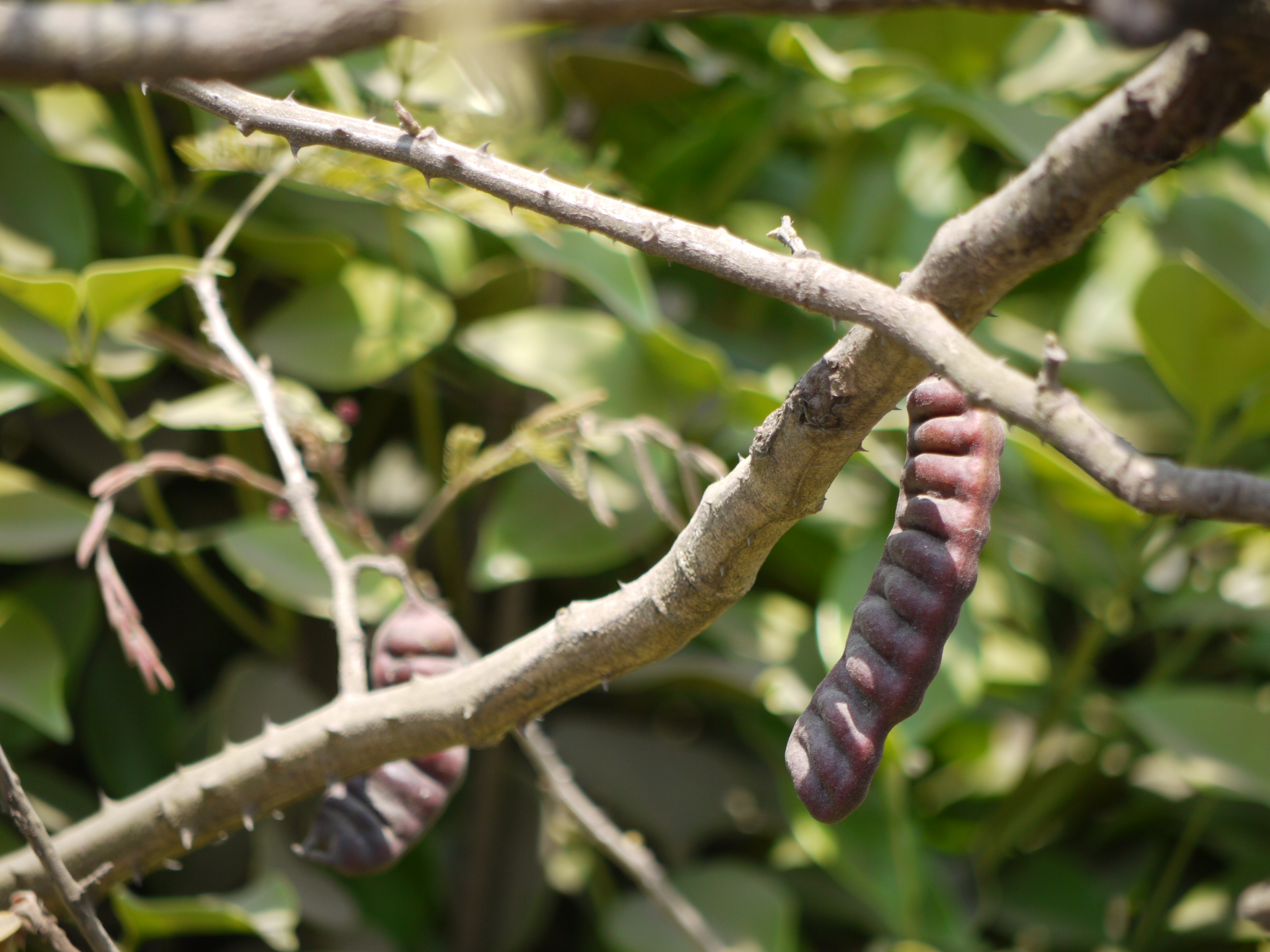
Pods

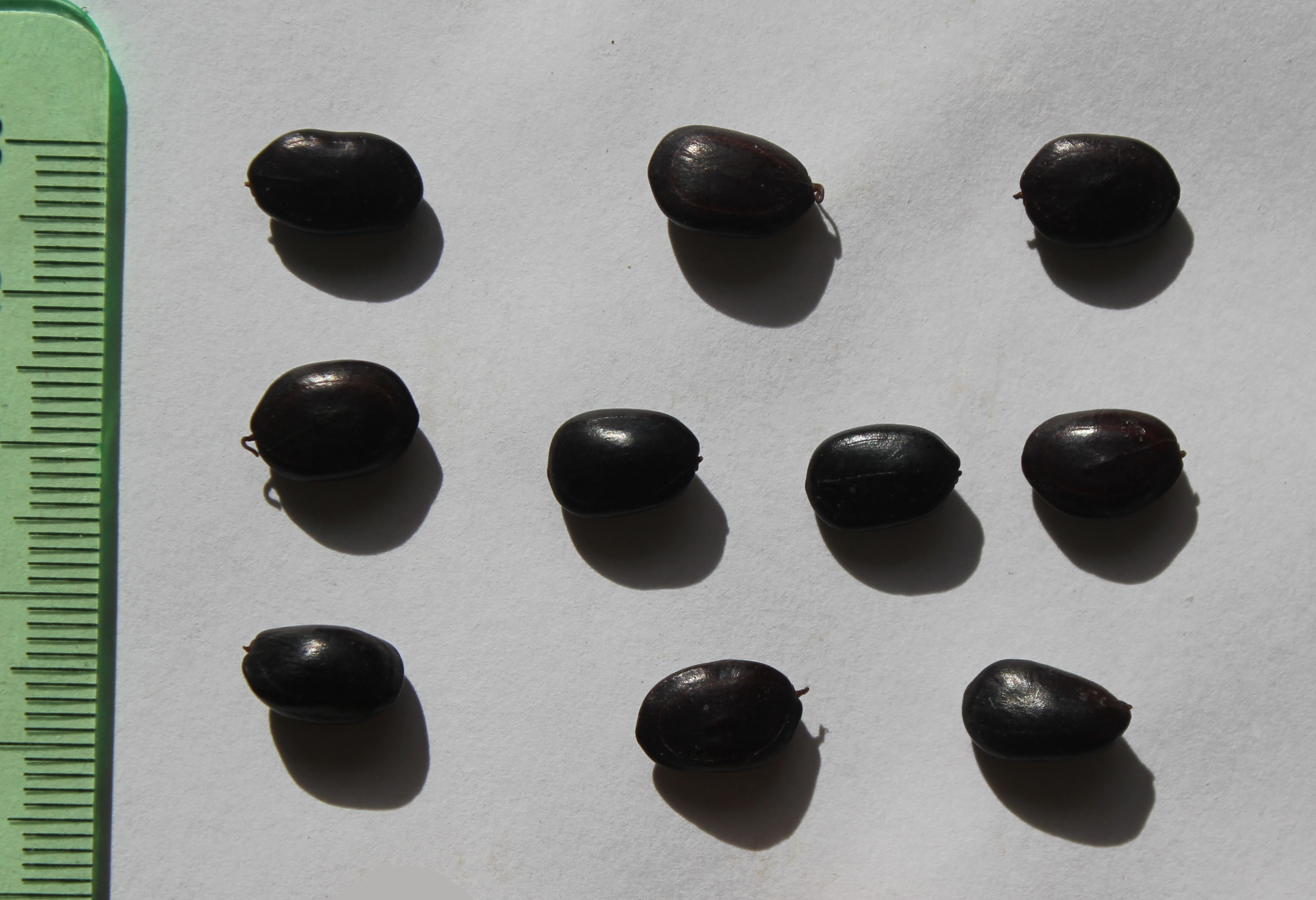
Seeds

== History ==
The two American botanists, Nathaniel Lord Britton (1859–1934, co-founder of the New York Botanical Garden), and Joseph Nelson Rose (1862–1928, of the Smithsonian), first described the taxa in 1928 in the publication North American Flora (vol. 23[2]: 120, published by the New York Botanical Garden. This taxa was subsumed into the well-known species Acacia concinna, however with advances in DNA analysis and consequent revision of plant phylogeny, the species S. rugata was recognized as having precedence in 2015 by Maslin and others. The epitaph rugata is derived from rugatus (Latin), meaning 'wrinkled', referring to the state of the pods when dry.
