= Quế Ngọc Hải =

Vietnamese footballer

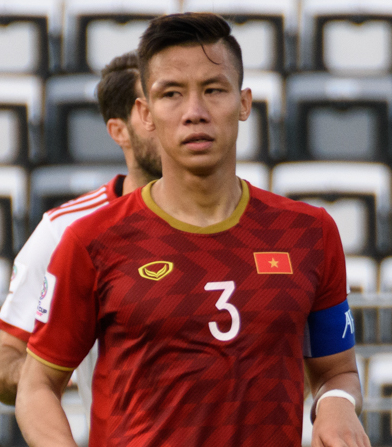
- Ngọc Hải playing for Vietnam at the 2019 AFC Asian Cup

Personal information
- Full name: Quế Ngọc Hải
- Date of birth: 15 May 1993 (age 33)
- Place of birth: Diễn Châu, Nghệ An, Vietnam
- Height: 1.80 m (5 ft 11 in)
- Position: Centre-back

Team information
- Current team: SHB Đà Nẵng
- Number: 8

Youth career
- 2004–2012: Sông Lam Nghệ An

Senior career*
Years	Team	Apps	(Gls)
2010–2012	→ Pha Đin Quảng Ngãi (loan)		
2012–2019	Sông Lam Nghệ An	125	(12)
2019–2022	Viettel	49	(1)
2022–2023	Sông Lam Nghệ An	38	(2)
2023–2025	Becamex Bình Dương	35	(0)
2025–2026	Đông Á Thanh Hóa	6	(0)
2026–	SHB Đà Nẵng	14	(0)

International career^{‡}
2011–2012	Vietnam U19	7	(2)
2014–2015	Vietnam U23	12	(2)
2014–2024	Vietnam	80	(6)
Medal record
Men's football
Representing Vietnam
Southeast Asian Games
Bronze medal – third place	Singapore 2015	Team
AFF Championship
Winner	ASEAN 2018	Team
Runner-up	ASEAN 2022	Team
- * Club domestic league appearances and goals as of 7 June 2026 ‡ National team caps and goals as of 13 October 2024

Quế Ngọc Hải (born 15 May 1993) is a Vietnamese professional footballer who plays as a centre-back and captain for V.League 1 club SHB Đà Nẵng. He is considered one of the best defenders in Southeast Asia football history.

Ngọc Hải represented Vietnam at under-19 and under-23 level before making his full international debut in September 2014. He captained the Vietnam national football team.

== Club career ==
=== Sông Lam Nghệ An ===
==== Trần Anh Khoa incident ====
In the 25th round of the 2015 V-League between Sông Lam Nghệ An and SHB Đà Nẵng, SHB Đà Nẵng midfielder Trần Anh Khoa was fouled by Quế Ngọc Hải of Sông Lam Nghệ An. Hải two-footed Khoa, hitting him in the knee. Khoa was unable to continue playing and was taken off the field on a stretcher. Khoa's injury was diagnosed as very serious and he had to travel to Singapore for surgery. Doctors estimated that he would need to rest for one year and had only a 50% chance of returning to the field. After the match, Hải was penalized by the VFF: he was banned from playing for six months and was ordered to pay for all of Khoa's medical expenses. The amount that Hải had to pay Khoa was around 800 million đồng.

On 17 December 2015, after SHB Đà Nẵng provided detailed costs of Anh Khoa's surgery, travel, medicine, etc., totaling 834 million đồng, Quế Ngọc Hải and a representative of Sông Lam Nghệ An handed over the money in cash to Anh Khoa. Of the above money, 400 million đồng was donated by Đoàn Nguyên Đức (Bầu Đức), 70 million đồng came from donations from the Sông Lam Nghệ An fan club, and the rest was provided by the sponsors of Sông Lam Nghệ An. This foul effectively ended Trần Anh Khoa's professional football career.

== International career ==
As of 4 October 2024

Vietnam
Year	Apps	Goals
2014	7	1
2015	3	0
2016	12	0
2017	3	0
2018	10	0
2019	12	2
2021	15	1
2022	6	1
2023	9	1
2024	3	0
Total	80	6

=== U-23 ===
#	Date	Venue	Opponent	Score	Result	Competition
1.	7 June 2015	Bishan, Bishan Stadium	Timor-Leste	3–0	4–0	2015 Southeast Asian Games
2.	15 June 2015	Kallang, National Stadium	Indonesia	5–0	5–0	2015 Southeast Asian Games

=== Vietnam ===
Scores and results list Vietnam's goal tally first.

No.	Date	Venue	Opponent	Score	Result	Competition
1.	22 November 2014	Mỹ Đình National Stadium, Hanoi, Vietnam	Indonesia	1–0	2–2	2014 AFF Championship
2.	16 January 2019	Hazza bin Zayed Stadium, Abu Dhabi, United Arab Emirates	Yemen	2–0	2–0	2019 AFC Asian Cup
3.	15 October 2019	Kapten I Wayan Dipta Stadium, Gianyar, Indonesia	Indonesia	2–0	3–1	2022 FIFA World Cup qualification
4.	11 June 2021	Al-Maktoum Stadium, Dubai, United Arab Emirates	Malaysia	2–1	2–1	2022 FIFA World Cup qualification
5.	27 December 2022	Mỹ Đình National Stadium, Hanoi, Vietnam	Malaysia	2–0	3–0	2022 AFF Championship
6.	15 June 2023	Lạch Tray Stadium, Hải Phòng, Vietnam	Hong Kong	1–0	1–0	Friendly

== Personal life ==
Ngọc Hải was born in Diễn Châu District. At an early age, due to financial difficulties, he moved to Vinh, where his parents made a living as fruit sellers. Ngọc Hải and his older brother Ngọc Mạnh are very close and attended the Sông Lam Nghệ An football academy together. Ngọc Mạnh suffered a serious knee injury however, and with little money the family had to rely on Ngọc Hải to work hard and become professional, both to provide for his family and pay for his brothers surgery.

After scoring the opening goal against Indonesia in the 2014 AFF Suzuki Cup Ngọc Hải lifted his shirt to reveal a picture of Nguyễn Hữu Thắng to thank his former coach for the opportunities he gave him.

== Honours ==
Sông Lam Nghệ An

- Vietnamese National Cup: 2017

Viettel

- V.League 1: 2020

Vietnam

- AFF Championship: 2018; runner-up: 2022
- AYA Bank Cup: 2016
- VFF Cup: 2022

Individual

- AFF Championship All-time XI: 2021
- AFF Championship Best XI: 2014
- ASEAN Football Federation Best XI: 2019
