= Quế Ngọc Mạnh =

Vietnamese footballer (born 1990)

Personal information
- Full name: Quế Ngọc Mạnh
- Date of birth: March 28, 1990 (age 36)
- Place of birth: Diễn Châu, Nghệ An, Vietnam
- Height: 1.73 m (5 ft 8 in)
- Position: Defender

Youth career
- 2004–2010: Sông Lam Nghệ An

Senior career*
Years	Team	Apps	(Gls)
2011–2014	Sông Lam Nghệ An	23	(0)
2015–2017	XSKT Cần Thơ	28	(0)
2018	Becamex Bình Dương	13	(0)
2019	Hồ Chí Minh City	2	(0)
2020	Bà Rịa–Vũng Tàu	11	(0)
2021–2022	Công An Nhân Dân	5	(0)
Total		82	(0)
- * Club domestic league appearances and goals as of 22 June 2018

Quế Ngọc Mạnh (born 28 March 1990) is a former Vietnamese footballer who played as a defender.

Quế Ngọc Mạnh is the elder brother of footballer Quế Ngọc Hải.

== Honours ==
Công An Nhân Dân

- V.League 2: 2022
