= Tayaw kinpun =

Traditional shampoo used in Myanmar

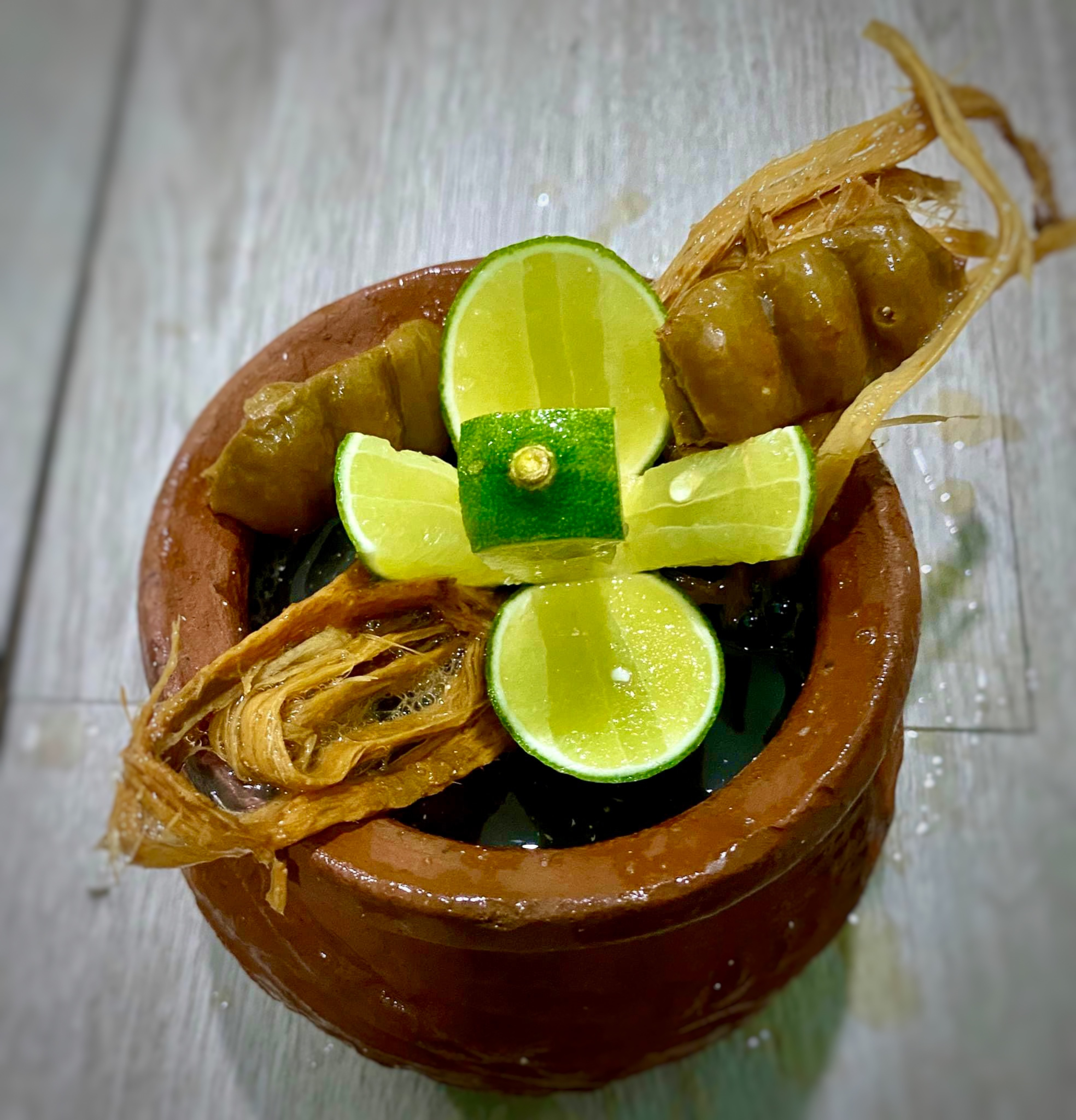
Traditional tayaw kinpun shampoo

Tayaw kinpun (Burmese: တရော် ကင်ပွန်း, pronounced [təjò kìɰ̃mʊ́ɰ̃] or pronounced [təjò kìɰ̃bʊ́ɰ̃]; also transliterated tayaw kinmun or tayaw kinbun) is a traditional shampoo used in Myanmar. Its main ingredients are the bark of the tayaw (Grewia) tree and the soapy kinpun (Senegalia rugata) fruit. Lime may also be added to the mix. Shampooing with tayaw kinpun has been an important tradition in Burmese culture since ancient times. Burmese kings used to wash their hair with tayaw kinpun during the royal hair-washing ceremony (ခေါင်းဆေး မင်္ဂလာပွဲ), in the belief that using the shampoo would cast away bad luck and bring good luck. Today, it is still customary for many Burmese people to wash their heads with tayaw kinpun on the Burmese New Year's Day to leave behind impurities and bad omens of the past.

In addition to its ritual uses, tayaw kinpun is still widely used by the Burmese people, and is commonly sold in the country's open-air markets, typically in plastic bags.

== Legend ==
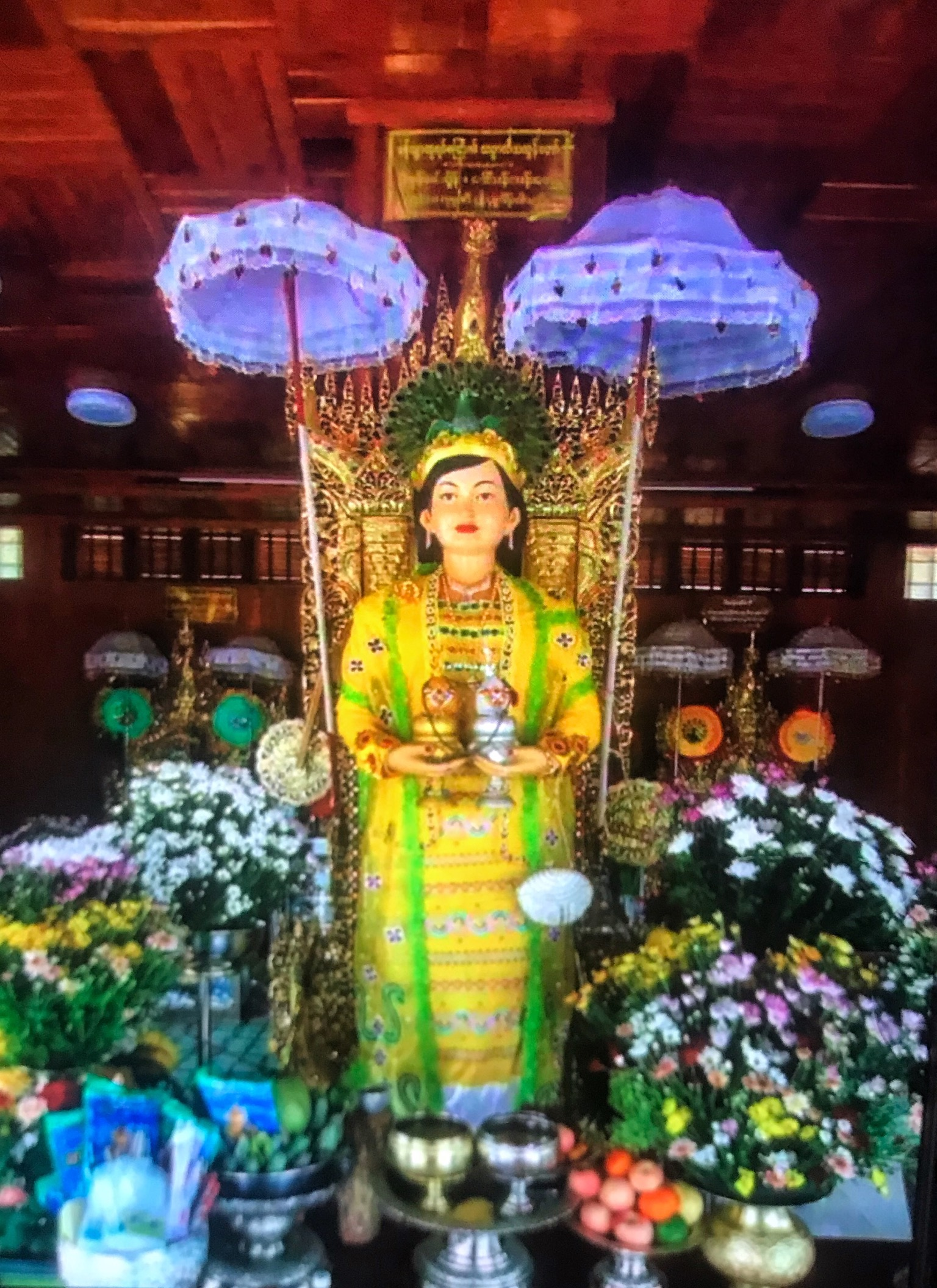
Statue of Queen Panhtwar

According to legend, King Duttabaung of Sri Ksetra possessed supernatural powers from his prominent mole in the middle of his forehead. Known as the Three-Eyed King, Duttabaung conquered Beikthano, and took the conquered state's ruler Panhtwar as his queen. Though defeated, Queen Panhtwar vowed to win her kingdom back. Upon discovering that the king's mole was the source of his powers, she devised a plan to minimize the powers of the mole by giving the king a face towel, made from her htamein (sarong). The king lost his powers using the towel. He soon faced myriad rebellions, and had to flee the capital. While on the run, he rested under a large tayaw tree, surrounded by kinpun plants. When it began raining, his head was soaked with the brew of tayaw and kinpun plants, which cast away the spell of Panhtwar's towel, and his powers reappeared. From then on, successive Burmese kings used the tayaw kinpun mix to wash their hair ritualistically to cast away the evil, and augment their powers.

== In popular culture ==
- On 13 April 2021, two months after the 2021 Myanmar coup d'état, activists in Mandalay launched a tayaw kinpun strike, in which tubes of the shampoo were wrapped in anti-government flyers.
