= Tha Pha, Chiang Mai =

Coordinates: 18.4852°N 98.3782°E

Tha Pha ท่าผา
- Tambon
- Interactive map of Tha Pha
- Country: Thailand
- Province: Chiang Mai
- District: Mae Chaem

Population (2005)
  - Total: 4,952
- Time zone: UTC+7 (ICT)

Tha Pha (Thai: ท่าผา) is a tambon (subdistrict) of Mae Chaem District, in Chiang Mai Province, Thailand. In 2005 it had a population of 4,952 people. The tambon contains 14 villages.
