= Lê Hồng Minh =

Vietnamese footballer (born 1978)

Personal information
- Full name: Lê Hồng Minh
- Date of birth: September 15, 1978 (age 48)
- Place of birth: Đông Sơn, Thanh Hóa, Vietnam
- Height: 1.72 m (5 ft 8 in)
- Position: Midfielder

Youth career
- 1990–1997: Thanh Hóa

Senior career*
Years	Team	Apps	(Gls)
1998–2003	Thanh Hóa	76	(12)
2004–2008	SHB Đà Nẵng	112	(22)
2009–2011	Hà Nội T&T	45	(5)

International career
2001–2007	Vietnam	25	(1)
- * Club domestic league appearances and goals

Lê Hồng Minh (born September 15, 1978) is a former Vietnamese footballer. He was a member of the Vietnam national football team.

== Career ==
Lê Hồng Minh began playing football with local side Thanh Hóa FC, debuting in the first division at age 17. Soon, he began playing for Vietnam's Olympic football team, and was made captain of his club.

== International Goals ==
#	Date	Venue	Opponent	Score	Result	Competition
1.	December 26, 2006	Bangkok, Thailand	Kazakhstan	2-1	Won	2006 King's Cup
