= Ban Thap =

Ban Thap บ้านทับ
- Tambon
- Country: Thailand
- Province: Chiang Mai
- District: Mae Chaem

Population (2005)
  - Total: 6,234
- Time zone: UTC+7 (ICT)

Ban Thap (Thai: บ้านทับ) is a tambon (subdistrict) of Mae Chaem District, in Chiang Mai Province, Thailand. In 2005, it had a population of 6,234 people. The tambon contains 13 villages.
