= Mae Na Chon =

Mae Na Chon แม่นาจร
- Tambon
- Country: Thailand
- Province: Chiang Mai
- District: Mae Chaem

Population (2005)
  - Total: 10,184
- Time zone: UTC+7 (ICT)

Mae Na Chon (Thai: แม่นาจร) is a tambon (subdistrict) of Mae Chaem District, in Chiang Mai Province, Thailand. In 2005 it had a population of 10,184 people. The tambon contains 19 villages.
