= Lê Công Vinh =

Vietnamese footballer (born 1985)

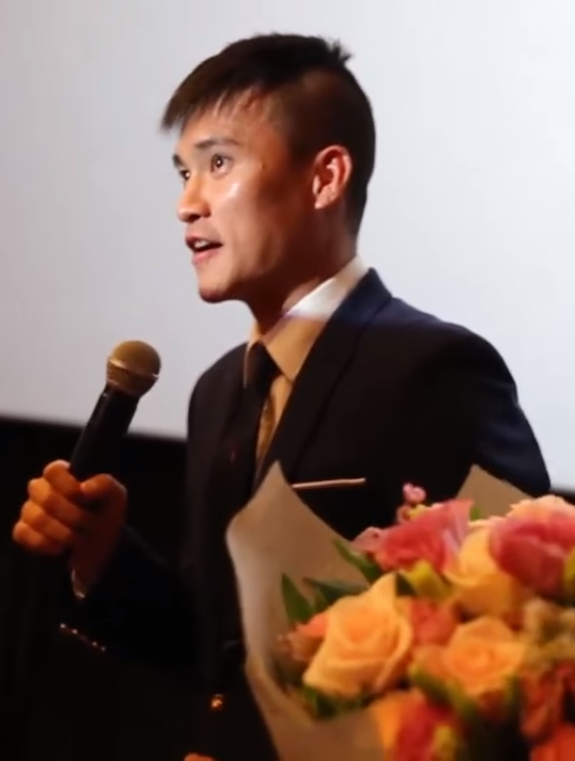
- Công Vinh in 2016

Personal information
- Date of birth: 10 December 1985 (age 40)
- Place of birth: Quỳnh Lưu, Nghệ An, Vietnam
- Height: 1.72 m (5 ft 8 in)
- Position: Striker

Youth career
- 1998–2004: Song Lam Nghe An

Senior career*
Years	Team	Apps	(Gls)
2004–2008	Song Lam Nghe An	61	(49)
2009–2011	Hanoi T&T	40	(26)
2009	→ Leixões (loan)	2	(0)
2012	Hanoi ACB	23	(11)
2013–2014	Song Lam Nghe An	36	(23)
2013	→ Hokkaido Consadole Sapporo (loan)	9	(2)
2015–2016	Becamex Binh Duong	35	(9)
Total		209	(124)

International career
2001–2003	Vietnam U20	9	(5)
2003–2007	Vietnam U23	28	(10)
2004–2016	Vietnam	83	(51)
Medal record
Vietnam Olympic
SEA Games
Silver medal – second place	SEA Games 2003	Football
Silver medal – second place	SEA Games 2005	Football
Vietnam
Winner	ASEAN Football Championship	2008
Winner	AYA Bank Cup	2016
- * Club domestic league appearances and goals

Lê Công Vinh (born 10 December 1985) is a Vietnamese former professional footballer who played as a striker. He was part of the Vietnam national team between 2004 and 2016. Considered one of the greatest players in Vietnamese football's history, Công Vinh is the all time top scorer for the Vietnam national team, won the 2008 AFF Championship, and received three Vietnamese Golden Ball Awards (2004, 2006, and 2007).

== Early life ==
Lê Công Vinh was born in Quỳnh Lâm, Quỳnh Lưu, Nghệ An; he has two older sisters and one younger sister. Due to difficult conditions for the whole family, his father smuggled cocaine; he was later arrested and sentenced to 12 years in jail. However, after only eight years due to good behavior, he was released before the due date.

== Club career ==
=== Song Lam Nghe An ===
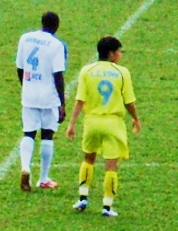
Lê Công Vinh playing for Song Lam Nghe An.

Born in Nghệ An, Công Vinh is a well-known Vietnamese footballer. Công Vinh is widely considered as one of the best strikers that Song Lam Nghe An has ever produced, along with Phạm Văn Quyến. He is currently SLNA's all-time top goal scorer.

At the age of 14, he began to train his football skill. After the qualification to junior team of Nghệ An, he was classified to be "not so potential", both in skill and mentality.

At the age of 18, he was picked into the main team of Song Lam Nghe An where he started to show his ability at JVC Cup 2003.

Until 2004, he scored his first score at V-League on 8 February against Dong Thap team. Later he received Best New Player of the Year as well as Best Player of the Year Award. Eventually, he received many invitations from other football clubs, even from Japan and Saudi Arabia for the salary up to $10,000 per month.

=== Hanoi T&T ===
In 2008, after a well-documented transfer saga, Công Vinh turned down Thể Công at the last minute to accept a more lucrative offer from Hanoi T&T; it was the highest transfer fee in Vietnamese football at the time.

=== Leixões ===
At the beginning of August 2009, T&T announced that Công Vinh would be joining Leixões of Portugal in a three-month loan deal, starting 1 September 2009. The deal was facilitated by Henrique Calisto, who was once Leixões' manager.

On 24 August 2009, Công Vinh officially signed with Leixões and was given the number 29 shirt. Two days later, in a friendly match against Padroense, he scored his first goal for the club, as a substitute, in the 89th minute to secure a 2–0 win. He was included in the 18-man squad for the match against defending champions Porto on 12 September, but did not make the field in an eventual 4–1 loss. His first-team debut came on 4 October, in a league contest against União de Leiria, making him the first ever Vietnamese footballer to play in a professional European league; he played the entire ninety minutes in an eventual 3–2 home win, despite trailing for most of the game.

On 18 October 2009, Công Vinh scored his first official goal for Leixões, in a 2–1 2009–10 Taça de Portugal win against Casa Pia. In January of the following year, he returned to Hà Nội T&T.

=== Hanoi ACB ===
Lê Công Vinh made the move from T&T to its city rivals Hanoi FC in September 2011. Công Vinh was set to sign a three-year extension with T&T but decided to move to ACB after the controversial 2011 V-League season and the set up at ACB.

=== Return to Song Lam Nghe An ===
After Hanoi FC was dissolved following the 2012 season, Công Vinh began the long process of finding a new club. After turning down trial offers from Sriwijaya of the Indonesia Super League and Consadole Sapporo of the J. League Division 2, he settled with a one-year loan move back to Song Lam Nghe An.

=== Consadole Sapporo ===
After failed negotiations earlier in the 2013 V.League 1 season, Le Cong Vinh announced that he would join J2 League side Consadole Sapporo on loan on 22 July 2013. His time with Consadole is scheduled to last five months from August 2013 through 1 January 2014. However, he decided to return to Vietnam one month earlier than expected because Consadole Sapporo could not advance to the play-off match. During his four months stay in Japan, he managed to score four times in 11 appearances for the club. With 2 of those goals and 9 of those appearances in the J2 League.

=== Becamex Binh Duong ===
In a game against Xi Mang Hai Phong on 27 April 2015, Công Vinh set the record for the fastest goal ever scored in Vietnamese football as he put the ball in the net with barely ten seconds played. Bình Dương kicked off the match with Công Vinh latching on to a quick pass to chip the ball over goalkeeper Nguyễn Thanh Thắng in an eventual 3–1 win.

== International career ==
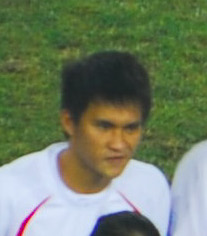
Lê Công Vinh in the final match of 2008 AFF Championship against Thailand.

In the first group match of the 2007 Asian Cup, Công Vinh scored the second goal for Vietnam to secure a 2–0 victory against United Arab Emirates. The team eventually reached the quarterfinals, before falling to eventual champions Iraq.

After a quiet and much criticized performance in the group stage in the 2008 AFF Championship, Công Vinh came through in the elimination stage. He set up the only goal in a 1–0 upset of defending champions Singapore. In the first leg of the final, Công Vinh scored the second to give Vietnam a victory against Thailand in Bangkok. In the second leg, Công Vinh set off celebrations throughout Vietnam as he headed home the tying goal in the last minute, thus giving Vietnam its first ever AFF Championship title.

After the 2016 AYA Bank Cup, Công Vinh announced that he would retire from international football after the 2016 AFF Championship. If only the Vietnamese national squad able to qualify for the finals in the 2016 edition, Công Vinh said that he will think twice about his retirement as he received request from international clubs to play in their league for the 2017 edition. Shortly after the end of Vietnam's match against Indonesia in the 2016 semi-finals, which they lost, Công Vinh retired from professional football.

== Playing style ==
Công Vinh was regarded as one of the prominent footballers in Vietnam and Southeast Asia during his career. Primarily a second striker, he was also used as a left winger and center forward. He was known for his pace, work rate, and ability in aerial play despite his height of 1.72m. He also took set pieces and free kicks during matches.

His weakness in playing style is that he cannot play well as a lone striker in tactical systems using only one forward because of his slender physique, which was proven in AFF Cup 2012. His disappointing performance in this tournament is an example when Coach Phan Thanh Hung deployed him play as a central forward in the 4–2–3–1 formation.

After his ACL injury in 2010, Công Vinh simplized his playing style when most of his goals came from his positioning and one-touch finishing.

Additionally, Công Vinh has stated that he idolises Luís Figo and Thierry Henry. His favourite approach is to attack the box from both flanks and attempt to strike or create scoring opportunities for his teammates.

== Honors ==
In 2009, Công Vinh ranked number five on Goal.com's Top Ten Most Promising Youngsters in Asian Football. In March 2009, he was given the Vietnamese Bronze Ball 2008, also holding the record for most goals scored in a single season by a Vietnamese player in the V.League for several seasons. By May 2010, he was the top Vietnamese goal-scorer in the league's history, also ranking second in the all-time top scorers table. On 22 March 2014, Công Vinh became the first player of the Vietnam football league to score 100 goals when Song Lam Nghe An won 3–1 against Hai Phong.

== Personal life ==
Rumors surfaced on 2 January 2009 that Công Vinh had been dating Vietnamese singer Thủy Tiên as they were spotted together on multiple occasions. During an interview before leaving Vietnam to join Leixões, Công Vinh revealed to the press that he and the singer were dating. They got engaged two years later. The couple had their first child, a daughter, on 2 January 2013 – four years to the day he first met Thủy Tiên.

=== Manager ===
After announcing his official retirement from professional football, Công Vinh joined Ho Chi Minh City FC as the deputy manager of the club, a role he served until May 2018.

== Controversy ==
On 21 March 2010, in the match between Hà Nội T&T and TĐCS Đồng Tháp in the 6th round of the 2010 V-League on Cao Lãnh field, Công Vinh was unhappy with the referee's decision and bowed to the main referee Vũ Bảo Linh and was given a yellow card. After the match, Công Vinh apologized but was still punished by the VFF Disciplinary Committee with a six-match suspension and a fine of 10 million dong (later reduced to three matches), There were even rumors that Công Vinh threatened to retire after receiving the penalty, which he had to correct several times. The Hà Nội T&T management also stripped him of his captain's armband after that match.

On 23 May 2018, Công Vinh and journalist Trần Minh released his autobiography Lê Công Vinh: Phút 89. The book caused controversy in the Vietnamese football community when Công Vinh included details such as Tấn Tài not passing the ball to him, coach Riedl rarely using him, or having conflicts with his predecessors such as Lê Huỳnh Đức or coach Lê Thụy Hải. Many of the people mentioned in the book expressed their dissatisfaction, saying that Công Vinh was making up stories, and even announced that they were "cutting ties" with him.

In early June 2021, Công Vinh appeared in two promotional videos for an online football streaming application called BK8. However, the application is actually an illegal gambling site. Công Vinh's representative later confirmed that the former captain of the Vietnamese national team was the person in the video, and said: "They promised that it was only an online TV application with a completely different domain name, and not related to gambling. However, we received information that gambling websites are using Công Vinh's image illegally. Công Vinh's side has contacted them to handle the issue since last week, but has not received a response. We are collecting evidence and working with lawyers." Công Vinh also apologized to the public and announced that he would never again accept an endorsement or advertisement for any football-related application.

== Career statistics ==
Scores and results list Vietnam's goal tally first, score column indicates score after each Công Vinh goal.

List of international goals scored by Lê Công Vinh
No.	Date	Venue	Opponent	Score	Result	Competition	Ref.
1	20 August 2004	Thống Nhất Stadium, Ho Chi Minh City, Vietnam	Myanmar	1–0‡	5–0	2004 LG Cup	
2	20 August 2004	Thống Nhất Stadium, Ho Chi Minh City, Vietnam	Myanmar	5–0	5–0	2004 LG Cup	
3	24 August 2004	Thống Nhất Stadium, Ho Chi Minh City, Vietnam	India	1–0	2–1	2004 LG Cup	
4	9 December 2004	Thống Nhất Stadium, Ho Chi Minh City, Vietnam	Cambodia	3–1	9–1	2004 AFF Championship	
5	9 December 2004	Thống Nhất Stadium, Ho Chi Minh City, Vietnam	Cambodia	8–1	9–1	2004 AFF Championship	
6	9 December 2004	Thống Nhất Stadium, Ho Chi Minh City, Vietnam	Cambodia	9–1	9–1	2004 AFF Championship	
7	15 December 2004	Mỹ Đình National Stadium, Hanoi, Vietnam	Laos	1–0	3–0	2004 AFF Championship	
8	26 December 2006	Suphachalasai Stadium, Bangkok, Thailand	Kazakhstan	2–1	2–1	2006 King's Cup	
9	28 December 2006	Suphachalasai Stadium, Bangkok, Thailand	Singapore	3–2	3–2	2006 King's Cup	
10	17 January 2007	Jalan Besar Stadium, Kallang, Singapore	Laos	1–0	9–0	2007 AFF Championship	
11	17 January 2007	Jalan Besar Stadium, Kallang, Singapore	Laos	2–0	9–0	2007 AFF Championship	
12	17 January 2007	Jalan Besar Stadium, Kallang, Singapore	Laos	5–0	9–0	2007 AFF Championship	
13	24 June 2007	Mỹ Đình National Stadium, Hanoi, Vietnam	Jamaica	1–0	3–0	Friendly	
14	30 June 2007	Mỹ Đình National Stadium, Hanoi, Vietnam	Bahrain	1–1	5–3	Friendly	
15	30 June 2007	Mỹ Đình National Stadium, Hanoi, Vietnam	Bahrain	2–1	5–3	Friendly	
16	8 July 2007	Mỹ Đình National Stadium, Hanoi, Vietnam	United Arab Emirates	1–0	2–0	2007 AFC Asian Cup	
17	1 October 2008	Thống Nhất Stadium, Ho Chi Minh City, Vietnam	Myanmar	1–1	2–3	2008 Ho Chi Minh City International Football Tournament	
18	1 October 2008	Thống Nhất Stadium, Ho Chi Minh City, Vietnam	Myanmar	2–3	2–3	2008 Ho Chi Minh City International Football Tournament	
19	5 October 2008	Thống Nhất Stadium, Ho Chi Minh City, Vietnam	Turkmenistan	2–3	2–3	2008 Ho Chi Minh City International Football Tournament	
20	26 November 2008	Jurong East Stadium, Jurong East, Singapore	Singapore	1–1	2–2 (4–5 pen.)	Friendly (Note: This match is not recognised by FIFA as a full international.)	
21	24 December 2008	Rajamangala Stadium, Bangkok, Thailand	Thailand	2–0	2–1	2008 AFF Championship	
22	28 December 2008	Mỹ Đình National Stadium, Hanoi, Vietnam	Thailand	1–1	1–1	2008 AFF Championship	
23	14 January 2009	Mỹ Đình National Stadium, Hanoi, Vietnam	Lebanon	2–0	3–1	2011 AFC Asian Cup qualification	
24	17 January 2010	Mỹ Đình National Stadium, Hanoi, Vietnam	China	1–2‡	1–2	2011 AFC Asian Cup qualification	
25	29 June 2011	Thống Nhất Stadium, Ho Chi Minh City, Vietnam	Macau	1–0	6–0	2014 FIFA World Cup qualification	
26	29 June 2011	Thống Nhất Stadium, Ho Chi Minh City, Vietnam	Macau	2–0	6–0	2014 FIFA World Cup qualification	
27	29 June 2011	Thống Nhất Stadium, Ho Chi Minh City, Vietnam	Macau	3–0‡	6–0	2014 FIFA World Cup qualification	
28	3 July 2011	Estádio Campo Desportivo, Macau	Macau	3–0	7–1	2014 FIFA World Cup qualification	(Note: News articles after the match originally attributed five goals to Vinh. Retrospective and updated sources attribute four goals to Vinh and instead credit the first goal of the match to Huỳnh Quang Thanh.)
29	3 July 2011	Estádio Campo Desportivo, Macau	Macau	4–0	7–1	2014 FIFA World Cup qualification	(Note: News articles after the match originally attributed five goals to Vinh. Retrospective and updated sources attribute four goals to Vinh and instead credit the first goal of the match to Huỳnh Quang Thanh.)
30	3 July 2011	Estádio Campo Desportivo, Macau	Macau	5–1	7–1	2014 FIFA World Cup qualification	(Note: News articles after the match originally attributed five goals to Vinh. Retrospective and updated sources attribute four goals to Vinh and instead credit the first goal of the match to Huỳnh Quang Thanh.)
31	3 July 2011	Estádio Campo Desportivo, Macau	Macau	6–1‡	7–1	2014 FIFA World Cup qualification	(Note: News articles after the match originally attributed five goals to Vinh. Retrospective and updated sources attribute four goals to Vinh and instead credit the first goal of the match to Huỳnh Quang Thanh.)
32	11 September 2012	Shah Alam Stadium, Shah Alam, Malaysia	Malaysia	1–0	2–0	Friendly	
33	2 July 2014	Gò Đậu Stadium, Thủ Dầu Một, Vietnam	Myanmar	3–0	6–0	Friendly	
34	2 July 2014	Gò Đậu Stadium, Thủ Dầu Một, Vietnam	Myanmar	4–0	6–0	Friendly	
35	2 July 2014	Gò Đậu Stadium, Thủ Dầu Một, Vietnam	Myanmar	5–0	6–0	Friendly	
36	6 September 2014	Lạch Tray Stadium, Haiphong, Vietnam	Hong Kong	3–1	3–1	Friendly	
37	22 November 2014	Mỹ Đình National Stadium, Hanoi, Vietnam	Indonesia	2–1	2–2	2014 AFF Championship	
38	25 November 2014	Mỹ Đình National Stadium, Hanoi, Vietnam	Laos	2–0	3–0	2014 AFF Championship	
39	11 December 2014	Mỹ Đình National Stadium, Hanoi, Vietnam	Malaysia	1–2‡	2–4	2014 AFF Championship	
40	11 December 2014	Mỹ Đình National Stadium, Hanoi, Vietnam	Malaysia	2–4	2–4	2014 AFF Championship	
41	8 October 2015	Mỹ Đình National Stadium, Hanoi, Vietnam	Iraq	1–0	1–1	2018 FIFA World Cup qualification	
42	24 March 2016	Mỹ Đình National Stadium, Hanoi, Vietnam	Chinese Taipei	1–1	4–1	2018 FIFA World Cup qualification	
43	24 March 2016	Mỹ Đình National Stadium, Hanoi, Vietnam	Chinese Taipei	4–1	4–1	2018 FIFA World Cup qualification	
44	31 May 2016	Mỹ Đình National Stadium, Hanoi, Vietnam	Syria	1–0	2–0	Friendly	
45	3 June 2016	Thuwunna Stadium, Yangon, Myanmar	Hong Kong	1–1	2–2 (4–3 pen.)	2016 AYA Bank Cup	
46	3 June 2016	Thuwunna Stadium, Yangon, Myanmar	Hong Kong	2–1	2–2 (4–3 pen.)	2016 AYA Bank Cup	
47	6 June 2016	Thuwunna Stadium, Yangon, Myanmar	Singapore	1–0	3–0 (a.e.t.)	2016 AYA Bank Cup	
48	6 October 2016	Thống Nhất Stadium, Ho Chi Minh City, Vietnam	North Korea	2–1	5–2	Friendly	
49	8 November 2016	Mỹ Đình National Stadium, Hanoi, Vietnam	Indonesia	1–1	3–2	Friendly	
50	20 November 2016	Thuwunna Stadium, Yangon, Myanmar	Myanmar	2–1	2–1	2016 AFF Championship	
51	26 November 2016	Wunna Theikdi Stadium, Naypyidaw, Myanmar	Cambodia	1–0	2–1	2016 AFF Championship	

== Honours ==
Hanoi T&T

- V.League 1: 2010
- Vietnamese Super Cup: 2010

Becamex Binh Duong

- V.League 1: 2015
- Vietnamese National Cup: 2015
- Vietnamese Super Cup: 2015
- Mekong Club Championship: 2014

Vietnam U23

- Southeast Asian Games: runner-up 2003, 2005

Vietnam

- AFF Championship: 2008

Individual

- Vietnamese Golden Ball: 2004, 2006, 2007
- Best Young Player of Vietnam Football Federation: 2004
- Best Goal in the ASEAN Football Championship: 2014
- V-League Team of the season: 2006, 2007, 2009, 2011, 2013

== See also ==
- List of men's footballers with 50 or more international goals
- List of top international men's football goal scorers by country
