= Kong Khaek =

Kong Khaek กองแขก
- Tambon
- Country: Thailand
- Province: Chiang Mai
- District: Mae Chaem

Population (2005)
  - Total: 6,205
- Time zone: UTC+7 (ICT)

Kong Khaek (Thai: กองแขก) is a tambon (subdistrict) of Mae Chaem District, in Chiang Mai Province, Thailand. In 2005 it had a population of 6,205 people. The tambon contains 12 villages.
