= Chang Khoeng =

Chang Khoeng ช่างเคิ่ง
- Tambon
- Country: Thailand
- Province: Chiang Mai
- District: Mae Chaem

Population (2005)
  - Total: 11,206
- Time zone: UTC+7 (ICT)

Chang Khoeng (Thai: ช่างเคิ่ง) is a tambon (subdistrict) of Mae Chaem District, in Chiang Mai Province, Thailand. In 2005, it had a total population of 11,206 people. The tambon contains 19 villages.
