= Lê Công Vinh: 89th Minute =

2018 Vietnamese autobiography by Lê Công Vinh

Lê Công Vinh: 89th minute
- Author: Lê Công Vinh, Trần Minh
- Original title: Lê Công Vinh: Phút 89
- Language: Vietnamese
- Publisher: Thế Giới Publisher (The World Publisher)
- Publication date: 23 May 2018
- Publication place: Vietnam
- Pages: 304

Lê Công Vinh: 89th minute (Vietnamese: Lê Công Vinh: Phút 89) is an autobiography written by Lê Công Vinh and journalist Trần Minh, first published on 23 May 2018 in Vietnam. It describes a skinny boy from the poor countryside of Nghệ An who rises from the bottom of SLNA's youth academy to become the top goal scorer for the Vietnamese national team, and was one of the most controversial sports autobiographies in Vietnam.

== Background ==
Journalist Trần Minh took three years to encourage Công Vinh to write his autobiography and spent another year getting it published. The writer himself has experience in translation and writing. He has translated popular autobiographies to Vietnamese such as The Naked Truth About Steel Puncher Mike Tyson and I Am Zlatan Ibrahimovic.

Công Vinh's wife, singer Thủy Tiên, also supported her husband in publishing the book. She believes he has an important story to tell. "Many boys dream of becoming football players like Vinh, so this book is not just about him; it can inspire young people to chase their dreams. The choice to write the book was Vinh's, not mine", said Thủy Tiên.

== Synopsis ==
89th Minute begins with Công Vinh's birth into a poor family in 1985. His father was imprisoned for drug trafficking, and his mother struggled to support three children by selling goods on the street. Despite suffering from bronchial asthma, Vinh found refuge in football.

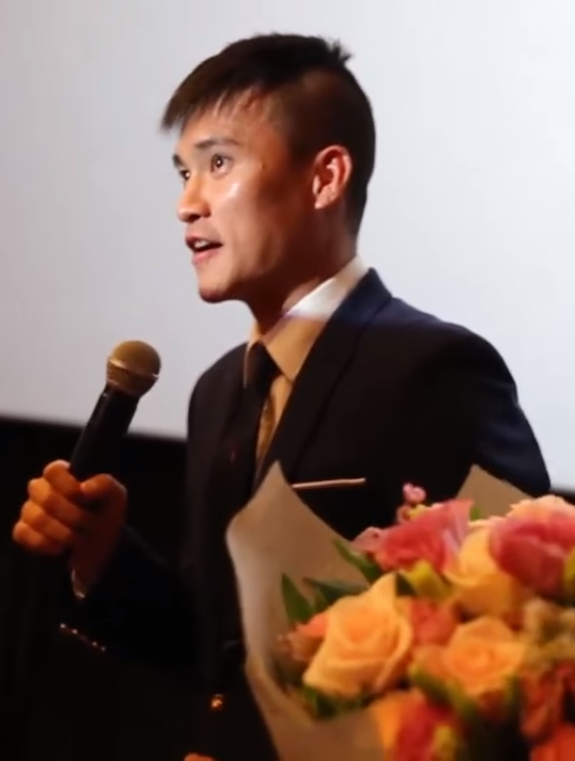
Công Vinh in 2016.

In his early years at the Sông Lam Nghệ An training academy, he endured harsh living conditions and was even dropped from the youth team. His breakthrough came in 2003 at the JVC Cup, where his performance earned him a place back on the team. From there, he quickly rose to become a key player for the club.

Each of his transfers to new teams created drama and, at times, controversy. Công Vinh mentions several issues in Vietnamese football, including the Bacolod match-fixing scandal, violence on and off the pitch, and lack of professionalism in the V.League 1. He also criticizes some individuals, include coach Lê Thụy Hải for involving in bribery, Lê Huỳnh Đức for treating him harshly during their time at national team, Phạm Văn Quyến for "smoking a lot, changing lovers like changing clothes", and Lê Tấn Tài for not passing the ball to him during their time in club and national team.

== Reception ==
Before it was published, the director of The World Publisher, Trần Hoàng Lâm, said that the autobiography made him feel uneasy.

After its publication, the book quickly sold 9,000 copies in just two weeks and sparked widespread public discussion at that time. It uncovers some troubling aspects of the sport, including stories about various coaches and teammates.

=== Players' reception ===
"I'm disappointed that he didn't mention any good memories, but only private matters that shouldn't have been discussed."

— Former football player and Công Vinh's teammate Lê Tấn Tài.

While many players and coaches admitted that the information shared by Công Vinh was mostly true, they criticized the way he chose to tell those stories. Coach Lê Thụy Hải was one of the first to speak up. Coach Lê Huỳnh Đức also threatened to sue Công Vinh for writing false information and said that his reputation had been violated. Another former footballer Phạm Văn Quyến, although mentioned a lot in the book, decided to not comment. Some of Công Vinh's former teammates such as Tấn Tài, Quốc Vượng and Như Thành, have spoken out with negative views; however, the others chose to stay silent.
