= Pang Hin Fon =

Pang Hin Fon ปางหินฝน
- Tambon
- Country: Thailand
- Province: Chiang Mai
- District: Mae Chaem

Population (2005)
  - Total: 6,856
- Time zone: UTC+7 (ICT)

Pang Hin Fon (Thai: ปางหินฝน) is a tambon (subdistrict) of Mae Chaem District, in Chiang Mai Province, Thailand. In 2005 it had a population of 6,856 people. The tambon contains 14 villages.
