= 2016 AYA Bank Cup =

International invitational football tournament in Myanmar

Tournament details
- Host country: Myanmar
- Dates: 3–6 June
- Teams: 4 (from 1 confederation)
- Venue: 1 (in 1 host city)

Final positions
- Champions: Vietnam (1st title)
- Runners-up: Singapore
- Third place: Myanmar
- Fourth place: Hong Kong

Tournament statistics
- Matches played: 4
- Goals scored: 11 (2.75 per match)
- Top scorer(s): (Vietnam) Lê Công Vinh (3 goals)

The 2016 AYA Bank Cup was a four-nation football tournament hosted in Yangon, Myanmar from 3–6 June 2016.

The tournament followed a straight knockout format with Vietnam and Hong Kong facing in the first semi-final and the first match of the tournament followed by a match between hosts Myanmar and Singapore.

Ayeyarwady Bank was the title sponsor of the tournament which signed a contract with the Myanmar Football Federation on 4 May 2016.

== Venue ==
Yangon
Thuwunna Stadium	2016 AYA Bank Cup (Myanmar)
Capacity: 32,000	2016 AYA Bank Cup (Myanmar)

== Results ==
- Times listed are local (UTC+6:30)

Semi-finals
3 June
Vietnam (p)	2 (4)
Hong Kong	2 (3)
3 June
Myanmar	0
Singapore	1

Final
6 June
Vietnam (a.e.t.)	3
Singapore	0
3rd place match
6 June
Hong Kong	0
Myanmar	3

=== Semi-finals ===
3 June 2016
15:00

Vietnam	2–2	Hong Kong
Lê Công Vinh 58', 61'	Report	McKee 49', 77'
Penalties
Trần Nguyên Mạnh (penalty scored); Quế Ngọc Hải (penalty scored); Lương Xuân Trường (penalty scored); Hoàng Đình Tùng (penalty missed); Nguyễn Văn Quyết (penalty scored)	4–3	(penalty missed) Itaparica; (penalty scored) Sandro; (penalty scored) Leung Kwun Chung; (penalty missed) Ngue; (penalty scored) Roberto

Thuwunna Stadium, Yangon
Attendance: 8,000
Referee: Thant Zin Oo (Myanmar)
3 June 2016
19:30

Myanmar	0–1	Singapore
	Report	Faris 34'

Thuwunna Stadium, Yangon
Attendance: 31,000
Referee: Nazmi Nasaruddin (Malaysia)

=== Third place match ===
6 June 2016
15:00

Hong Kong	0–3	Myanmar
	Report	Than Paing 22'; Maung Maung Lwin 74'; Ye Ko Oo 89'

Thuwunna Stadium, Yangon
Attendance: 6,200
Referee: Amirul Izwan Yaacob (Malaysia)

=== Final ===
6 June 2016
18:00

Vietnam	3–0 (a.e.t.)	Singapore
Lê Công Vinh 91'; Nguyễn Văn Quyết 99'; Đinh Thanh Trung 114'	Report

Thuwunna Stadium, Yangon
Attendance: 6,800
Referee: Khin Maung Win (Myanmar)

== Winners ==
The 2016 AYA Bank Cup Soccer Tournament
winners

Vietnam
first title

== See also ==
2026 AYA Bank Tri Nation Cup

- KBZ Bank U-19 Cup 2016
