= Mae Chaem district =

Mae Chaem แม่แจ่ม
- District
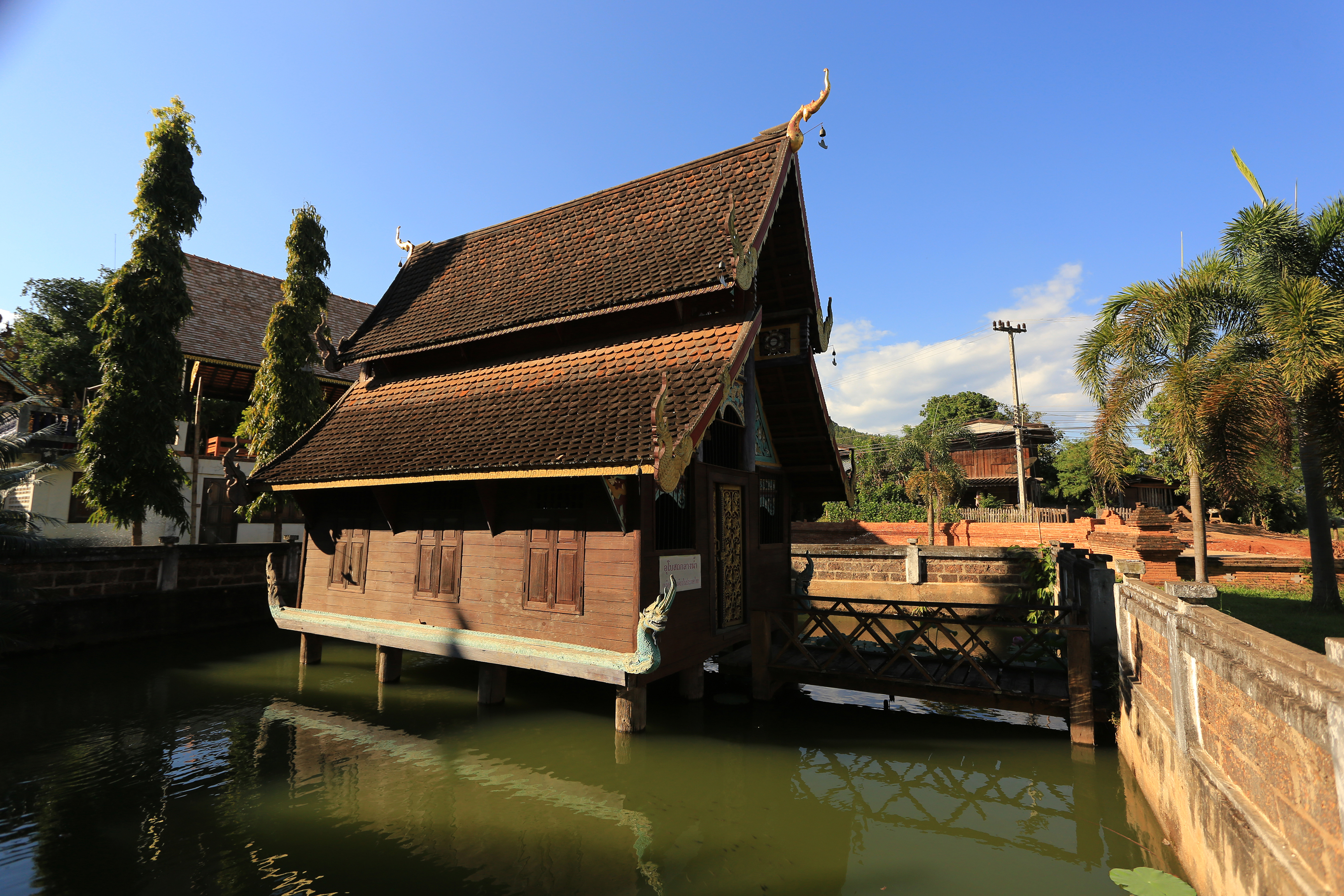
- Wat Phut En

- District location in Chiang Mai province
- Coordinates: 18°29′56″N 98°21′43″E
- Country: Thailand
- Province: Chiang Mai
- Seat: Chang Khoeng
- District established: 1908

Area
  - Total: 2,713.57 km^{2} (1,047.72 sq mi)

Population (2008)
  - Total: 57,214
  - Density: 21.1/km^{2} (55/sq mi)
- Time zone: UTC+7 (ICT)
- Postal code: 50270
- Geocode: 5003

Mae Chaem (Thai: แม่แจ่ม, pronounced [mɛ̂ː t͡ɕɛ̀m]) is a district (amphoe) of Chiang Mai province in northern Thailand.

== History ==
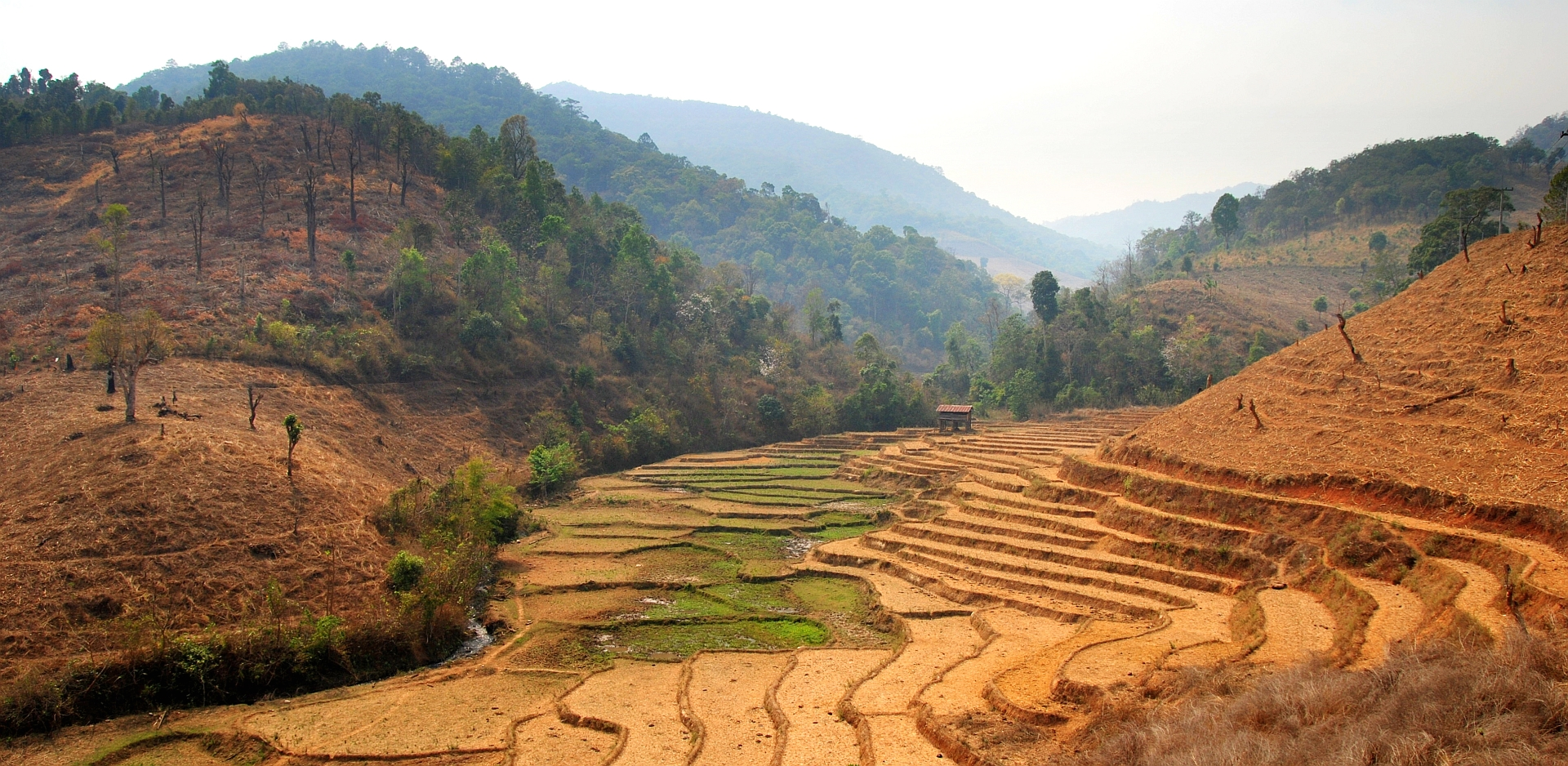
Rice paddies and recently cleared forest land along Rte 1263, Mae Chaem district

Mueang Chaem was created in 1908, consisting of the tambons Mae Thap, Tha Pha, Chang Khoeng, and Mae Suek split off from Chom Thong. In 1917 it was renamed Chang Khoeng, as the district office was in that tambon. In 1938 it was reduced to a minor district (king amphoe) and was subordinate to Chom Thong District. In 1939 it was renamed Mae Chaem. In 1956 it was upgraded to a full district.

In 2009 the northern part of the district was split off to form the new district, Galyani Vadhana.

== Geography ==
Neighboring districts are (from the north clockwise) Galyani Vadhana, Samoeng, Mae Wang, Chom Thong and Hot of Chiang Mai Province, and Mae Sariang, Mae La Noi, Khun Yuam, Mueang Mae Hong Son and Pai of Mae Hong Son province.

Thailand's highest mountain, 2,565 meters (8,415 feet) high Doi Inthanon, in the Thanon Thong Chai Range, is in Mae Chaem District.

== Economy ==
The district is a major producer of maize (corn). Some 170,000 rai (27,000 hectares) of the district are devoted to corn cultivation. Another 50,000 rai (8,000 hectares) are planted in rice. Mae Chaem's reliance on corn monoculture has created three problems: farmers are heavily indebted due to the cost of corn crop inputs (seed, fertilisers, other agricultural chemicals); corn waste totals 90,000 tonnes per year. Half the waste is reprocessed as fertiliser, wood pellets, and animal feed, but the other half is burned in the open, contributing to Chiang Mai's spring air pollution; finally, due to the district's high elevation upstream of the Ping River, sediment from soil erosion has drifted down 272 kilometres to Bhumibol Dam— Thailand's largest hydroelectric power plant—shortening its lifespan. This last issue in particular has prompted the Electricity Generating Authority of Thailand (EGAT), to create a program called "Energy for All". It envisions community-owned power generation from renewable resources. In Mae Chaem, the power project plans to use corn waste. EGAT has identified two district sites for the first-phase power plants. Each will have a capacity of one megawatt each. The two power plants will cost roughly 120 million baht each, with the initial electricity to be generated by 2022. Besides ending the open burning of corn residues, the project will provide power to the 70 Mae Chaem villages that have no electricity as of 2019. To eliminate soil erosion, corn monoculture is to be abandoned. The Energy Ministry will help locals to grow other plants such as giant acacia and bamboo to serve as biomass for the power plants.

== Administration ==
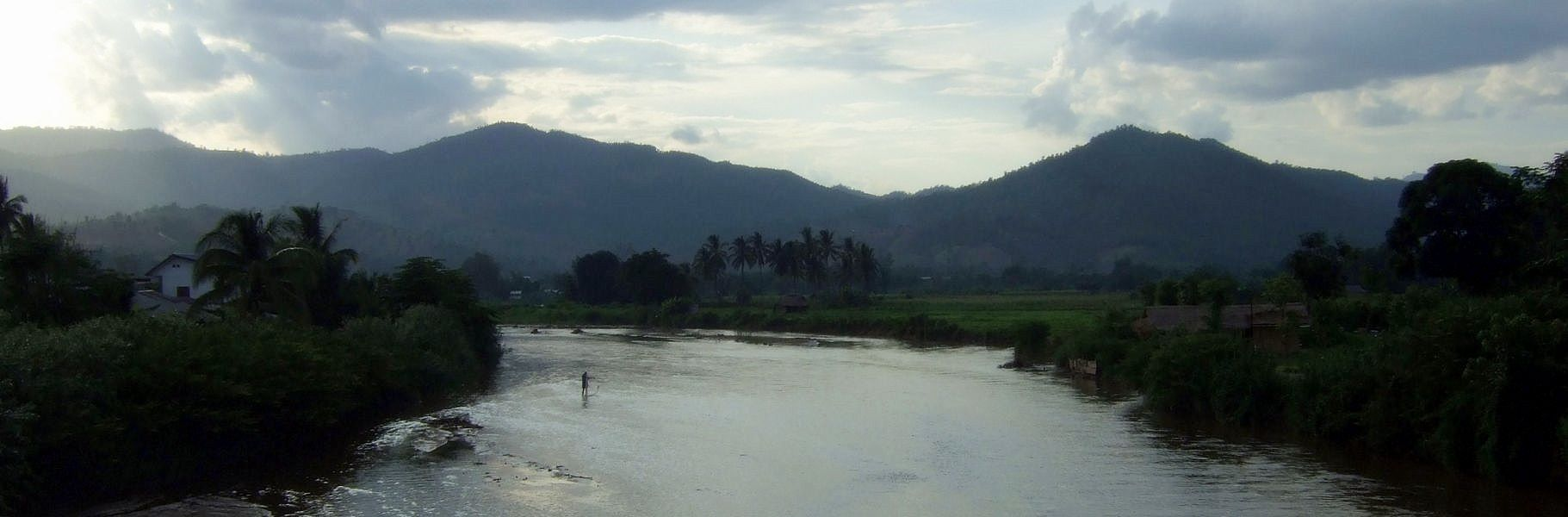
The river going through the town of Mae Chaem

The district is divided into seven sub-districts (tambons), which are further subdivided into 85 villages (mubans). Mae Chaem also has sub-district municipality (thesaban tambon) status and covers parts of tambon Chang Khoeng. There are a further seven tambon administrative organizations (TAO).

No.	Name	Thai	Villages	Pop.
1.	Chang Khoeng	ช่างเคิ่ง	19	11,206
2.	Tha Pha	ท่าผา	14	4,952
3.	Ban Thap	บ้านทับ	13	6,234
4.	Mae Suek	แม่ศึก	17	11,577
5.	Mae Na Chon	แม่นาจร	19	10,184
7.	Pang Hin Fon	ปางหินฝน	14	6,856
8.	Kong Khaek	กองแขก	12	6,205

Missing numbers belong to the sub-districts which became Galyani Vadhana District in 2009.

== Ethnography ==
Mae Chaem comprising five different ethnic groups, namely Tai Yuan, Paganyaw, Lua, Hmong, and Lisu.

== Gallery ==
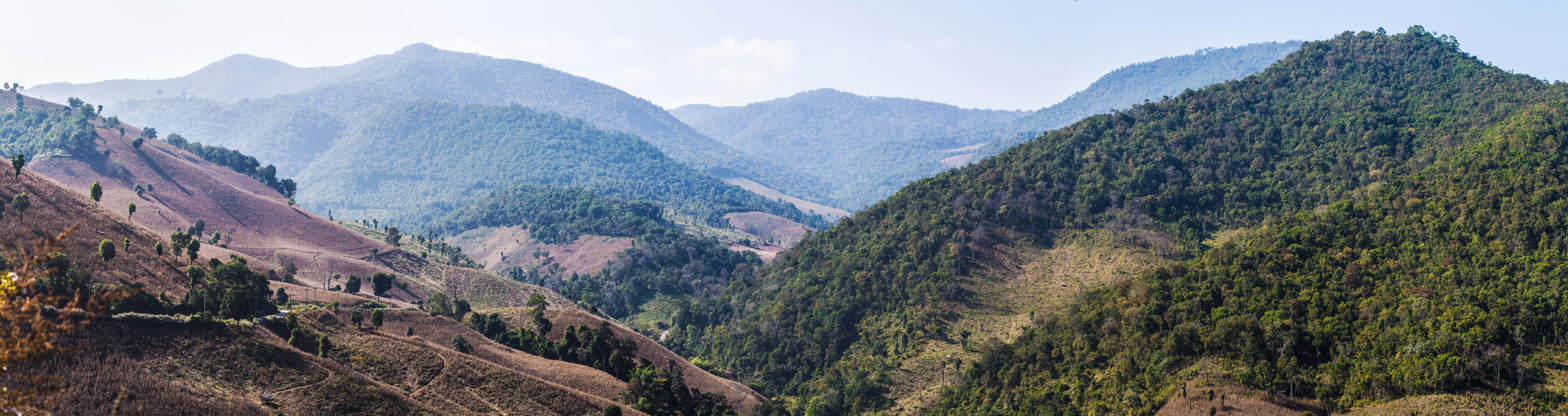
Forests cover a large part of Mae Chaem District

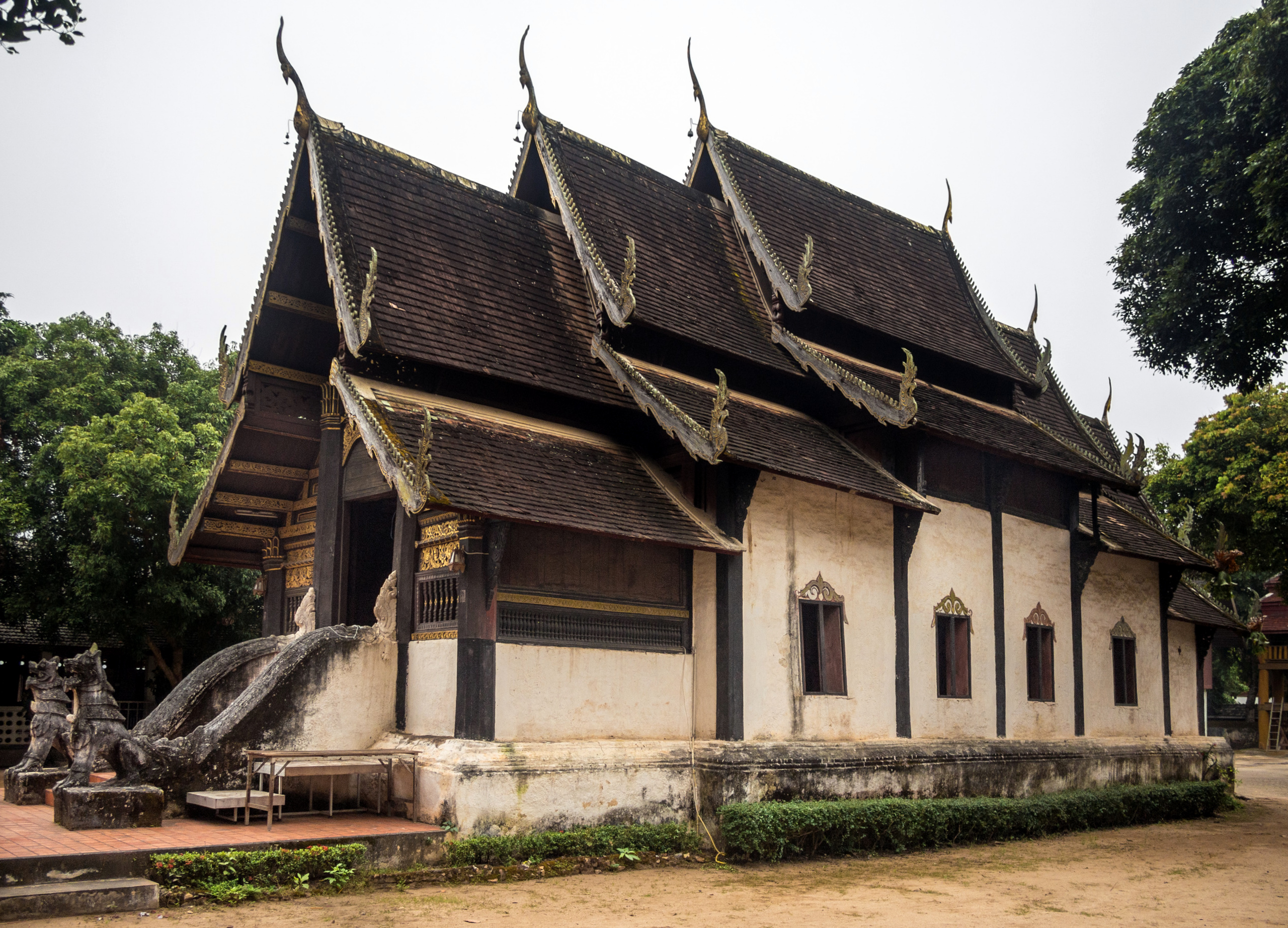
The wihan of Wat Pa Daet, on the southern end of the town of Mae Chaem

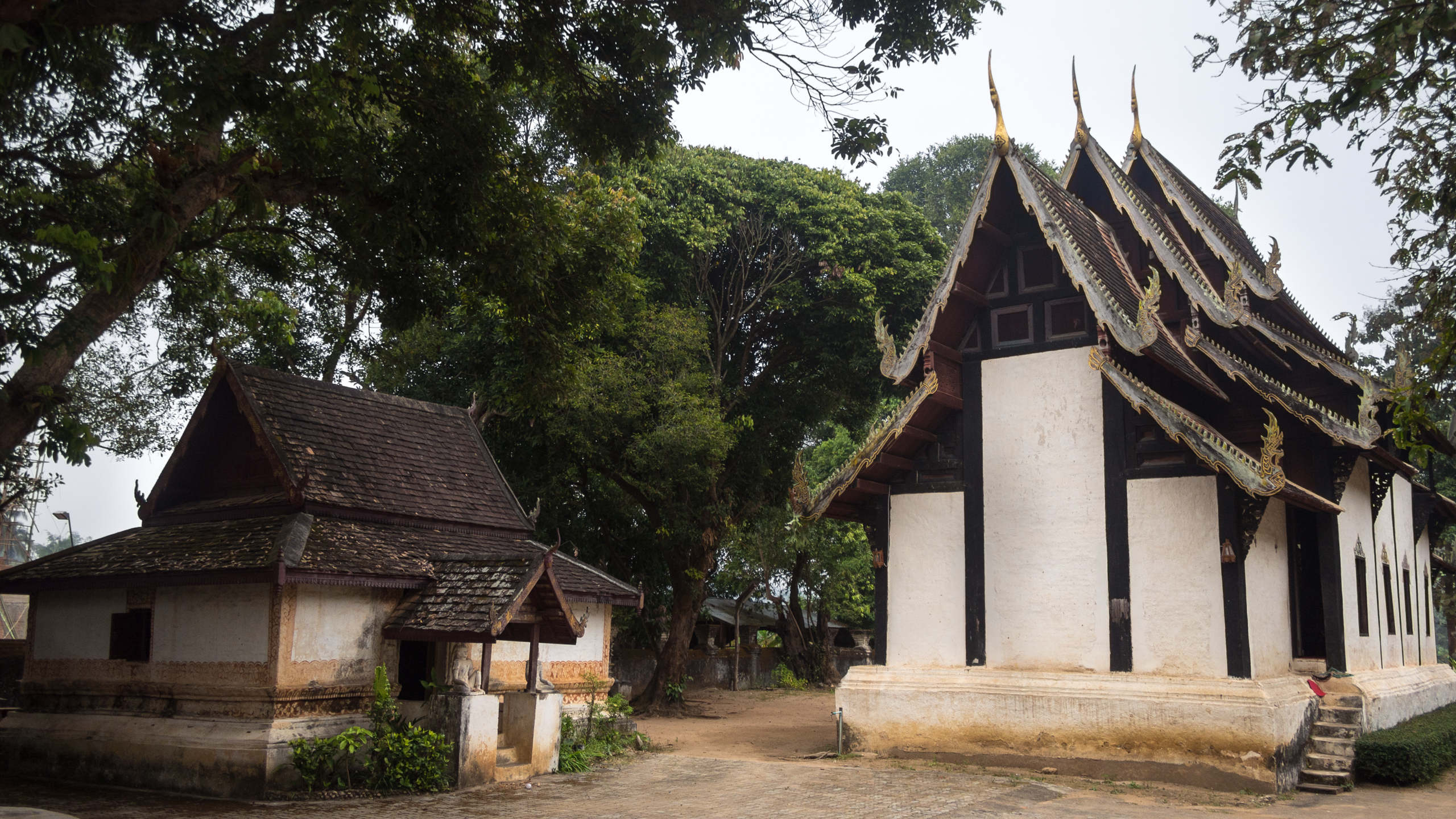
The ho trai (scriptures depository) and back façade of the wihan of Wat Pa Daet
