= 2012 Vietnamese Super Cup =

SHB Đà Nẵng	Xuân Thành Sài Gòn
4	0
- Date: 1 February 2013
- Venue: Chi Lăng Stadium, Da Nang

The 2012 PV Gas Vietnamese Super Cup Final was the 14th edition of the Vietnamese Super Cup, an annual football match contested by the winners of the previous season's V-League and Vietnamese Cup competitions.

== Match details ==
1 February 2013
16:00 UTC+07:00

SHB Đà Nẵng	4 – 0	Xuân Thành Sài Gòn
Quốc Anh 2', 70'; Merlo 66'; Mrwanda 85'	Report

Chi Lăng Stadium, Đà Nẵng

SHB ĐÀ NẴNG: Substitutes: Manager:	XUÂN THÀNH SÀI GÒN: Substitutes: Manager:

MAN OF THE MATCH

- Huỳnh Quốc Anh (SHB Đà Nẵng)

MATCH OFFICIALS

- Assistant referees:
- Fourth official:

MATCH RULES

- 90 minutes (two halves of 45 minutes each).
- Penalty shoot-out if scores still level.
- Seven named substitutes.
- Maximum of three substitutions.

Vietnamese Super Cup
2012 Winners
SHB Đà Nẵng
First title

== See also ==
- 2012 V-League
- 2012 Vietnamese Cup
