= Mae Suek =

Mae Suek แม่ศึก
- Tambon
- Interactive map of Mae Suek
- Coordinates: 18.7339°N 98.1951°E
- Country: Thailand
- Province: Chiang Mai
- District: Mae Chaem

Population (2005)
  - Total: 11,577
- Time zone: UTC+7 (ICT)

Mae Suek (Thai: แม่ศึก) is a tambon (subdistrict) of Mae Chaem District, in Chiang Mai Province, Thailand. In 2005 it had a population of 11,577 people. The tambon contains 11 villages.
