= Diễn Châu district =

Coordinates: 19.000°N 105.550°E

Diễn Châu district Huyện Diễn Châu
- Rural District
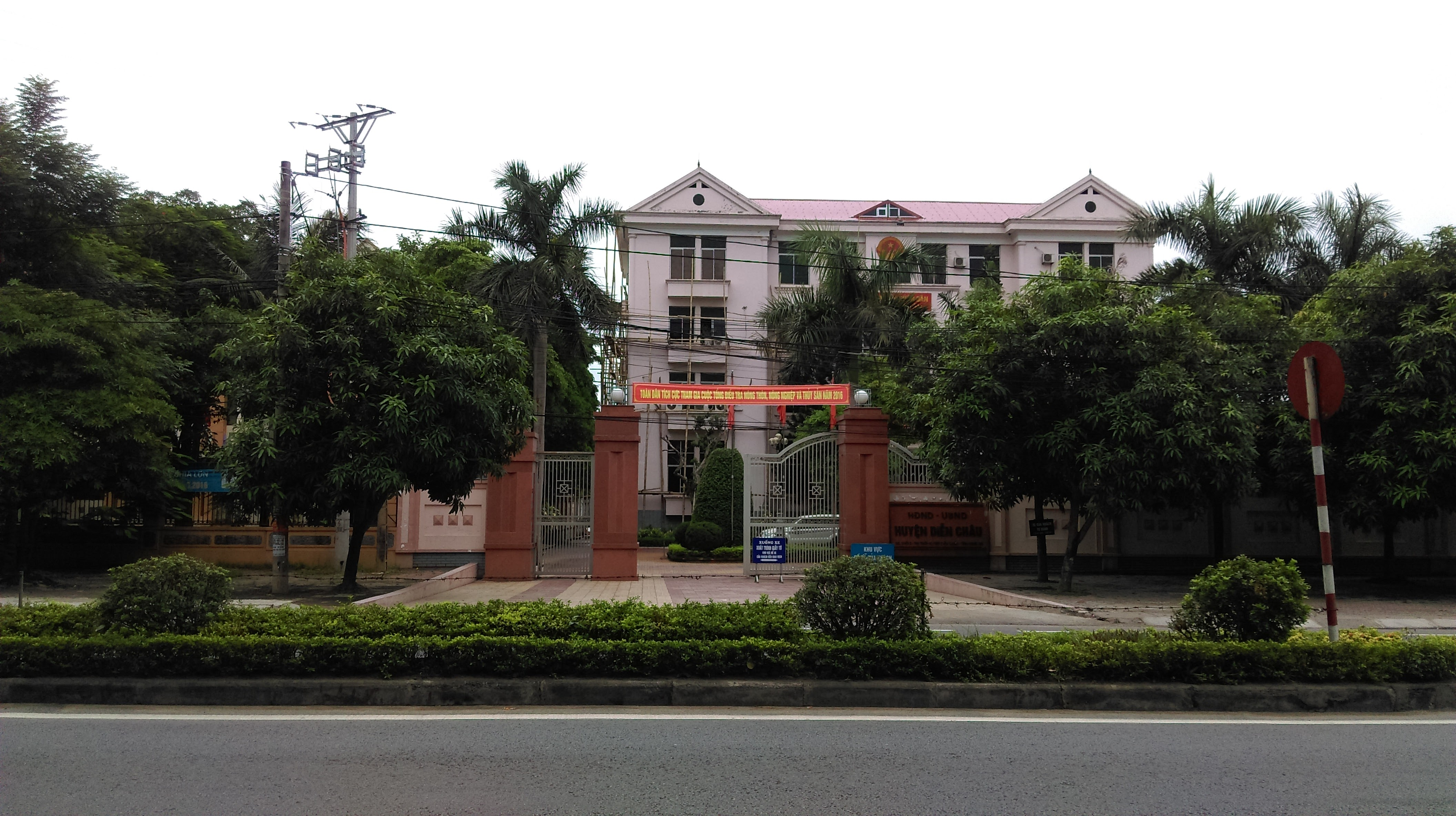
- People's Committee of Diễn Châu district.

- Nickname: "The Land of Learning" (Đất học xứ Nghệ)
- Motto: "Peace on the big waves" (Bình yên trên ngọn sóng cả)
- Interactive map of Diễn Châu district
- Country: Vietnam
- Region: North Central Coast
- Province: Nghệ An
- Establishment: May 22, 1969
- Central agency: Block 3, Diễn Châu Township

Government
  - Type: District People's Committee
  - Chairman: Tăng Văn Luyện
  - Vice-Chairmen: Phan Xuân Vinh; Phạm Xuân Sánh; Lê Mạnh Hiên

Area
  - Total: 33,262 km^{2} (12,843 sq mi)

Population (2018)
  - Total: 284,300
  - Density: 857/km^{2} (2,220/sq mi)
- Time zone: UTC+07:00 (Indochina Time)
- ZIP code: 425
- Website: Dienchau.Nghean.gov.vn; Dienchau.Nghean.dcs.vn

Diễn Châu is a rural district of Nghệ An province in the North Central Coast region of Vietnam.

== History ==
Diễn Châu is respected as one of the oldest lands in Vietnam, where the Vietnamese people have begun to form. It has at least 1,500 years from the historic records.

=== Middle Ages ===
Before the Sui dynasty, this area was almost abandoned and was the intersection between the Chinese empire and the Champa kingdom. Afterward, the Tang dynasty created the Diễn Châu place in their most prosperous period, but this land was only considered a non-important area of Hoan Châu. However, this land became especially famous for an unusual event. It was the shipwreck in 676 related to the poet Wang Bo. Currently, his grave (Vương Bột chi mộ) is located in the border between Diễn Châu and Nghi Lộc. In that place, the people set up the temple, even sculpt Wang Bo and his father Wang Fuzhi. This area was once an important spiritual place for authors and scholars from Nghệ An and Hà Tĩnh.

During a thousand years of Annam's monarchy, Diễn Châu has grown rapidly to become one of the elite lands of the empire. It has many people passing the imperial exams, royal officials, scholars, poets and writers. That is why Nghệ An people have given it the nickname "the land of learning".

Besides, Diễn Châu is also known as the residence of the Trần clan, those who are the descendants of Later Lê dynasty martial mandarin Trần Nguyên Hãn. According to the genealogy, when Emperor Lê Thái Tổ began to doubt Trần Nguyên Hãn's loyalty, the general took the initiative to take his wife and three sons from Thanh Hoa prefecture to the beach where is present Diễn Châu to flee. They had the merit of reclaiming and built the village, then became the ancestor of a large clan in Nghệ An province.

=== Modern era ===
In the meeting took place on the morning of August 16, 2023, the People's Committee of Nghệ An province issued the decision to approve the planning for construction of Diễn Châu rural district, Nghệ An province, in the time of 2021-2030, with vision to 2050, in which the orientation of Diễn Châu construction becomes a town at the town level before 2030. The purpose of this project is to make Diễn Châu a new center of finance, economy, trade, culture and tourism of the whole province.

== Culture ==
Diễn Châu's area is located on the most important road (đường cái quan) of Vietnam since the Middle Ages.

According to what has been handed down for a long time, Peacock Temple (đền Cuông) is the place to worship An Dương Vương, who has chosen Diễn Châu beach as a place to kill himself when losing the country. Inside the behind palace of the temple there is a headpiece statue, which is said to be princess Maechau, who was executed by her father to be guillotine because she accidentally helped her husband to harm her father. In a distant yard of the temple, there is a deep well, which is said to symbolize regret, because royal's groom Trọng Thủy committed suicide there because of his wife missing his wife. The reason is called the Peacock Temple because Maechau wore a shirt woven with peacock fur to be able to spread them on the fleeing path, and that helped Trọng Thủy found once again found her and her father. The temple is located in Diễn An commune, 1A National Route from Vinh to Hanoi. Its festival takes place on the 13-14-15th of lunar calendar every year.

Besides, this rural district is also famous for its activities such as folk songs, telling jokes, wrestling, tugging, modeling competitions...

The other feature of Diễn Châu is the richness of the units called as the trade village (làng nghề), which is similar to the Hanseatic League. Accordingly, each village has its own basic profession, accompanied by traditions in the code of conduct and professional secrets. Some examples : Bronze casting, iron forging, lime, silkworm raising, weaving, sedge carpet, molasses, rice noodles...

According to a report from the Nghệ An Provincial Party Committee in 2021, Diễn Châu has 34,058 people who are Catholic, in addition, there are 11,000 people claiming to be Buddhist followers. Đông Tháp Parish is part of Vinh Diocese, what has all 10 parish areas. Its current shepherd is Bishop Antôn Nguyễn Văn Đính.

== Geography ==
Diễn Châu is adjacent to the rural districts Yên Thành (West), Nghi Lộc (South) and Quỳnh Lưu (North). The East of this rural district looks out of the Diễn Châu Bay (vũng Diễn Châu), which is a part of the Tonkin Gulf.

As of 2018 the district had a population of 284,300. Of which, up to 15% of the population is the Catholic. The district covers an area of 331.62 km^{2}. The district capital lies at Diễn Châu Township.

== See also ==
- Quỳnh Lưu
- Tân Kỳ
