= 2008 AFF Championship squads =

Association football competition squads

This article lists the squads for 2008 AFF Championship. Players marked (c) were named as captain for their national squad.

== Group A ==
=== Indonesia ===
Head coach: Benny Dollo

| No. | Pos. | Player | Date of birth (age) | Caps | Club |
|---|---|---|---|---|---|
| 1 | GK | Markus Horison | 14 March 1981 (aged 27) | 9 | (Indonesia) Persik Kediri |
| 2 | DF | Muhammad Roby | 12 September 1985 (aged 23) | 5 | (Indonesia) Persija Jakarta |
| 3 | DF | Erol Iba | 6 August 1979 (aged 29) | 9 | (Indonesia) Pelita Jaya |
| 5 | DF | Fandy Mochtar | 19 March 1984 (aged 24) | 3 | (Indonesia) Arema Malang |
| 6 | DF | Charis Yulianto (c) | 11 July 1978 (aged 30) | 24 | (Indonesia) Sriwijaya |
| 8 | FW | Elie Aiboy | 20 April 1979 (aged 29) | 39 | (Indonesia) Pelita Jaya |
| 9 | FW | Talaohu Musafri | 19 February 1982 (aged 26) | 3 | (Indonesia) Persiba Balikpapan |
| 10 | FW | Aliyudin Ali | 7 May 1980 (aged 28) | 4 | (Indonesia) Persija Jakarta |
| 11 | MF | Ponaryo Astaman | 5 September 1979 (aged 29) | 48 | (Indonesia) Persija Jakarta |
| 12 | GK | Ferry Rotinsulu | 28 December 1982 (aged 25) | 2 | (Indonesia) Sriwijaya |
| 13 | FW | Budi Sudarsono | 19 September 1979 (aged 29) | 36 | (Indonesia) Persik Kediri |
| 14 | DF | Ismed Sofyan | 28 August 1979 (aged 29) | 44 | (Indonesia) Persija Jakarta |
| 15 | MF | Firman Utina | 15 December 1981 (aged 26) | 21 | (Indonesia) Pelita Jaya |
| 16 | MF | Syamsul Chaeruddin | 9 February 1983 (aged 25) | 27 | (Indonesia) PSM Makassar |
| 17 | FW | Muhammad Ilham | 22 January 1981 (aged 27) | 4 | (Indonesia) Persija Jakarta |
| 19 | FW | Arif Suyono | 3 January 1984 (aged 24) | 6 | (Indonesia) Arema Malang |
| 20 | FW | Bambang Pamungkas | 10 June 1980 (aged 28) | 53 | (Indonesia) Persija Jakarta |
| 23 | GK | Dian Agus | 3 August 1985 (aged 23) | 3 | (Indonesia) Pelita Jaya |
| 25 | DF | Isnan Ali | 15 September 1979 (aged 29) | 17 | (Indonesia) Sriwijaya |
| 26 | FW | Irsyad Aras | 4 March 1979 (aged 29) | 1 | (Indonesia) PSM Makassar |
| 30 | DF | Nova Arianto | 4 November 1979 (aged 29) | 2 | (Indonesia) Persib Bandung |

=== Singapore ===
Head Coach: (Serbia) Radojko Avramovic

| No. | Pos. | Player | Date of birth (age) | Caps | Club |
|---|---|---|---|---|---|
| 1 | GK | Hassan Sunny | 2 April 1984 (aged 24) | 16 | (Singapore) Tampines Rovers |
| 2 | MF | Ridhuan Muhammad | 6 May 1984 (aged 24) | 42 | (Singapore) Tampines Rovers |
| 3 | DF | Baihakki Khaizan | 31 January 1984 (aged 24) | 58 | (Singapore) Young Lions |
| 4 | MF | Isa Halim | 15 May 1986 (aged 22) | 21 | (Singapore) Young Lions |
| 5 | DF | Noh Rahman | 2 August 1980 (aged 28) | 57 | (Singapore) Geylang United |
| 6 | DF | Precious Emuejeraye | 21 March 1983 (aged 25) | 38 | (Singapore) Gombak United |
| 7 | MF | Shi Jiayi | 2 September 1983 (aged 25) | 34 | (Singapore) Home United |
| 8 | FW | Mohd Noh Alam Shah | 3 September 1980 (aged 28) | 62 | (Singapore) Tampines Rovers |
| 9 | FW | Aleksandar Duric | 12 August 1970 (aged 38) | 12 | (Singapore) SAFFC |
| 10 | FW | Indra Sahdan Daud (c) | 5 March 1979 (aged 29) | 96 | (Singapore) Home United |
| 11 | FW | Agu Casmir | 22 March 1984 (aged 24) | 22 | (Singapore) Gombak United |
| 13 | DF | Juma'at Jantan | 23 March 1984 (aged 24) | 7 | (Singapore) Home United |
| 14 | MF | John Wilkinson | 24 August 1979 (aged 29) | 17 | (Singapore) SAFFC |
| 15 | MF | Mustafic Fahrudin | 17 April 1981 (aged 27) | 37 | (Singapore) Tampines Rovers |
| 16 | DF | Daniel Bennett | 7 January 1978 (aged 30) | 74 | (Singapore) SAFFC |
| 17 | MF | Shahril Ishak | 23 January 1984 (aged 24) | 61 | (Singapore) Home United |
| 18 | GK | Lionel Lewis | 16 December 1982 (aged 25) | 55 | (Singapore) Home United |
| 19 | DF | Ismail Yunos | 24 October 1986 (aged 22) | 6 | (Singapore) Young Lions |
| 21 | MF | Mustaqim Manzur | 28 January 1982 (aged 26) | 5 | (Singapore) SAFFC |
| 22 | DF | Shaiful Esah | 26 May 1986 (aged 22) | 0 | (Singapore) SAFFC |
| 23 | GK | Hyrulnizam Jumaat | 14 November 1986 (aged 22) | 0 | (Singapore) Young Lions |
| 26 | DF | Rosman Sulaiman | 6 November 1982 (aged 26) | 0 | (Singapore) Home United |

=== Myanmar ===
Head Coach: (Brazil) Marcos Antonio Falopa

| No. | Pos. | Player | Date of birth (age) | Caps | Club |
|---|---|---|---|---|---|
| 1 | GK | Aung Aung Oo | 8 June 1982 (aged 26) | | (Myanmar) Finance and Revenue |
| 2 | DF | Min Thu | 2 June 1979 (aged 29) | | (Myanmar) Commerce |
| 3 | DF | Thura Aung | 27 March 1990 (aged 18) | | (Myanmar) Kanbawza |
| 4 | MF | Kyaw Khing Win | 23 December 1983 (aged 24) | | (Myanmar) Energy |
| 5 | DF | Moe Win | 30 August 1988 (aged 20) | | (Myanmar) Kanbawza |
| 6 | DF | Khin Maung Lwin | 27 December 1988 (aged 19) | | (Myanmar) Kanbawza |
| 7 | MF | Aung Myo Thant | 1 December 1988 (aged 20) | | (Myanmar) Commerce |
| 8 | MF | Zaw Htet Aung | 11 May 1987 (aged 21) | | (Myanmar) Energy |
| 9 | FW | Yan Paing | 27 November 1983 (aged 25) | | (Myanmar) Finance and Revenue |
| 10 | FW | Soe Myat Min (c) | 19 May 1982 (aged 26) | | (Myanmar) Finance and Revenue |
| 11 | MF | Myo Min Tun | 14 July 1986 (aged 22) | | (Myanmar) Commerce |
| 12 | MF | Aung Kyaw Moe | 2 July 1983 (aged 25) | | (Myanmar) Finance and Revenue |
| 13 | DF | Han Win Aung | 17 December 1986 (aged 21) | | (Myanmar) Kanbawza |
| 14 | DF | Zaw Lin Tun | 20 October 1982 (aged 26) | | (Myanmar) Home Affairs |
| 15 | MF | Tun Tun Win | 15 December 1987 (aged 20) | | (Myanmar) Finance and Revenue |
| 16 | MF | Yazar Win Thein | 9 April 1988 (aged 20) | | (Myanmar) Commerce |
| 17 | MF | Pai Soe | 22 January 1987 (aged 21) | | (Myanmar) Finance and Revenue |
| 18 | FW | Aung Kyaw Myo | 5 May 1990 (aged 18) | | (Myanmar) Construction |
| 19 | FW | Kyaw Thiha | 24 August 1986 (aged 22) | | (Myanmar) Kanbawza |
| 20 | FW | Si Thu Win | 5 October 1985 (aged 23) | | (Myanmar) Home Affairs |
| 22 | GK | Kyaw Zin Htet | 2 March 1990 (aged 18) | | (Myanmar) Kanbawza |

=== Cambodia ===
Head Coach: Prak Sovannara

| No. | Pos. | Player | Date of birth (age) | Caps | Club |
|---|---|---|---|---|---|
| 1 | GK | Samreth Seiha | 22 April 1990 (aged 18) | | (Cambodia) National Defense Ministry |
| 2 | DF | Kim Chanbunrith (c) | 13 March 1979 (aged 29) | | (Cambodia) Nagacorp |
| 3 | DF | Lay Raksmey | 29 October 1989 (aged 19) | | (Cambodia) Preah Khan Reach |
| 4 | DF | Tieng Tiny | 9 June 1986 (aged 22) | | (Cambodia) Nagacorp |
| 5 | DF | Thul Sothearith | 28 November 1985 (aged 23) | | (Cambodia) Khemara |
| 6 | DF | Chea Virath | 7 September 1982 (aged 26) | | (Cambodia) Khemara |
| 7 | MF | Khim Borey | 29 September 1989 (aged 19) | | (Cambodia) National Defense Ministry |
| 8 | MF | Ieng Saknida | 17 March 1980 (aged 28) | | (Cambodia) Nagacorp |
| 9 | FW | Hok Sochivorn | 23 September 1983 (aged 25) | | (Cambodia) Phuchung Neak |
| 10 | FW | Kouch Sokumpheak | 15 February 1987 (aged 21) | | (Cambodia) Khemara |
| 11 | MF | Chan Rithy | 11 November 1983 (aged 25) | | (Cambodia) Phnom Penh Empire |
| 13 | MF | San Narith | 7 November 1986 (aged 22) | | (Cambodia) Khemara |
| 14 | MF | Sun Sovannarith | 11 February 1987 (aged 21) | | (Cambodia) Nagacorp |
| 16 | MF | Samel Nasa | 25 April 1984 (aged 24) | | (Cambodia) Preah Khan Reach |
| 17 | FW | Sok Rithy | 30 December 1990 (aged 17) | | (Cambodia) Preah Khan Reach |
| 18 | GK | Ouk Mic | 15 September 1983 (aged 25) | | (Cambodia) Khemara |
| 19 | MF | Pich Sina | 16 March 1982 (aged 26) | | (Cambodia) Nagacorp |
| 20 | DF | Sun Sampratna | 13 July 1982 (aged 26) | | (Cambodia) Nagacorp |
| 22 | MF | Ngoun Chansothea | 13 October 1990 (aged 18) | | (Cambodia) Preah Khan Reach |
| 23 | MF | Hout Sokunthea | 20 October 1990 (aged 18) | | (Cambodia) National Defense Ministry |

== Group B ==
=== Malaysia ===
Head Coach: B. Sathianathan

| No. | Pos. | Player | Date of birth (age) | Caps | Club |
|---|---|---|---|---|---|
| 1 | GK | Syed Adney Syed Hussein | 29 November 1986 (aged 22) | 13 | (Malaysia) UPB-MyTeam |
| 2 | DF | S. Subramaniam | 31 August 1985 (aged 23) | 5 | (Malaysia) Perak |
| 4 | DF | Mohd Asraruddin Putra Omar | 26 March 1988 (aged 20) | 3 | (Malaysia) Selangor |
| 5 | DF | Norhafiz Zamani Misbah | 15 July 1981 (aged 27) | 73 | (Malaysia) Pahang |
| 7 | DF | Mohd Aidil Zafuan Abdul Radzak | 3 August 1987 (aged 21) | 14 | (Malaysia) Negri Sembilan |
| 8 | FW | Mohd Zaquan Adha Abdul Radzak | 3 August 1987 (aged 21) | 10 | (Malaysia) Negri Sembilan |
| 9 | MF | Mohd Nor Farhan Muhammad | 19 December 1984 (aged 23) | 11 | (Malaysia) Kelantan |
| 10 | FW | Mohd Safee Mohd Sali | 29 January 1984 (aged 24) | 16 | (Malaysia) Selangor |
| 11 | FW | Mohd Nizaruddin Yusof | 10 November 1979 (aged 29) | 50 | (Malaysia) Perak |
| 12 | MF | Muhammad Shukor Adan (c) | 24 September 1979 (aged 29) | 51 | (Malaysia) Selangor |
| 13 | FW | Indra Putra Mahayuddin | 2 September 1981 (aged 27) | 44 | (Malaysia) Kelantan |
| 14 | MF | Mohd Khyril Muhymeen Zambri | 10 May 1987 (aged 21) | 13 | (Malaysia) Kedah |
| 15 | DF | Mohd Daudsu Jamaluddin | 18 March 1985 (aged 23) | 8 | (Malaysia) Kelantan |
| 18 | DF | Muhamad Kaironnisam Sahabudin Hussain | 10 May 1979 (aged 29) | 61 | (Malaysia) UPB-MyTeam |
| 19 | MF | Mohammad Hardi Jaafar | 30 May 1979 (aged 29) | 25 | (Malaysia) Selangor |
| 20 | FW | Hairuddin Omar | 29 September 1979 (aged 29) | 49 | (Malaysia) PBDKT T-Team |
| 22 | GK | Mohd Helmi Eliza Elias | 20 January 1983 (aged 25) | 6 | (Malaysia) Kedah |
| 24 | FW | Farderin Kadir | 30 January 1987 (aged 21) | 0 | (Malaysia) Kuala Muda Naza |
| 25 | MF | Azi Shahril Azmi | 20 September 1985 (aged 23) | 7 | (Malaysia) Perlis |
| 26 | DF | Muhammad Juzaili Samion | 18 October 1981 (aged 27) | 26 | (Malaysia) UPB-MyTeam |
| 27 | MF | Mohd Amirul Hadi Zainal | 27 May 1986 (aged 22) | 9 | (Malaysia) Selangor |
| 28 | GK | Mohd Farizal Marlias | 29 June 1986 (aged 22) | 0 | (Malaysia) Perlis |

=== Thailand ===
Head Coach : (England) Peter Reid

| No. | Pos. | Player | Date of birth (age) | Caps | Club |
|---|---|---|---|---|---|
| 1 | GK | Kittisak Rawangpa | 3 January 1975 (aged 33) | 38 | (Thailand) Osotsapa |
| 2 | DF | Suree Sukha | 27 July 1982 (aged 26) | 34 | (Thailand) Chonburi |
| 3 | DF | Patiparn Phetphun | 25 September 1980 (aged 28) | 10 | (Thailand) Provincial Electricity Authority |
| 4 | DF | Cholratit Jantakam | 2 June 1985 (aged 23) | 3 | (Thailand) Chonburi |
| 5 | DF | Niweat Siriwong | 18 July 1977 (aged 31) | 88 | (Thailand) BEC Tero Sasana |
| 6 | DF | Nattaporn Phanrit | 11 January 1982 (aged 26) | 36 | (Thailand) Chonburi |
| 7 | MF | Datsakorn Thonglao (c) | 30 December 1983 (aged 24) | 51 | (Vietnam) Hoàng Anh Gia Lai |
| 8 | MF | Suchao Nuchnum | 17 May 1983 (aged 25) | 29 | (Thailand) TOT |
| 9 | FW | Ronnachai Rangsiyo | 1 August 1988 (aged 20) | 3 | (Thailand) Provincial Electricity Authority |
| 10 | FW | Teerasil Dangda | 6 June 1988 (aged 20) | 16 | (Thailand) Muangthong United |
| 11 | FW | Tana Chanabut | 6 June 1984 (aged 24) | 8 | (Thailand) Chonburi |
| 12 | DF | Natthapong Samana | 29 June 1984 (aged 24) | 18 | (Thailand) Chonburi |
| 13 | FW | Anon Sangsanoi | 3 March 1984 (aged 24) | 4 | (Thailand) BEC Tero Sasana |
| 14 | FW | Teeratep Winothai | 16 February 1985 (aged 23) | 24 | (Thailand) BEC Tero Sasana |
| 15 | MF | Surat Sukha | 27 July 1982 (aged 26) | 3 | (Thailand) Chonburi |
| 16 | MF | Arthit Sunthornpit | 19 January 1985 (aged 23) | 2 | (Thailand) Chonburi |
| 17 | FW | Sutee Suksomkit | 5 June 1980 (aged 28) | 52 | (Singapore) Tampines Rovers |
| 18 | GK | Sinthaweechai Hathairattanakool | 23 March 1982 (aged 26) | 41 | (Thailand) Chonburi |
| 19 | MF | Pichitphong Choeichiu | 28 August 1982 (aged 26) | 32 | (Thailand) Muangthong United |
| 20 | DF | Panupong Wongsa | 23 November 1983 (aged 25) | 1 | (Thailand) Provincial Electricity Authority |
| 21 | MF | Salahudin Arware | 1 November 1983 (aged 25) | 2 | (Thailand) Muangthong United |
| 22 | MF | Rangsan Viwatchaichok | 22 January 1979 (aged 29) | 6 | (Thailand) Provincial Electricity Authority |

=== Vietnam ===
Head Coach: (Portugal) Henrique Calisto

| No. | Pos. | Player | Date of birth (age) | Caps | Club |
|---|---|---|---|---|---|
| 1 | GK | Dương Hồng Sơn | 20 November 1982 (aged 26) | | (Vietnam) Hà Nội T&T |
| 2 | DF | Đoàn Việt Cường | 1 January 1985 (aged 23) | | (Vietnam) TĐCS Đồng Tháp |
| 3 | DF | Nguyễn Minh Đức | 14 September 1983 (aged 25) | | (Vietnam) Sông Lam Nghệ An |
| 4 | DF | Lê Phước Tứ | 15 April 1984 (aged 24) | | (Vietnam) Thể Công |
| 5 | MF | Nguyễn Minh Châu | 9 January 1985 (aged 23) | | (Vietnam) Xi Măng Hải Phòng |
| 6 | DF | Phan Thanh Giang | 3 October 1981 (aged 27) | | (Vietnam) Đồng Tâm Long An |
| 7 | DF | Vũ Như Thành | 28 August 1981 (aged 27) | | (Vietnam) Becamex Bình Dương |
| 8 | FW | Thạch Bảo Khanh | 25 April 1979 (aged 29) | | (Vietnam) Thể Công |
| 9 | FW | Lê Công Vinh | 10 December 1985 (aged 22) | | (Vietnam) Sông Lam Nghệ An |
| 10 | MF | Trần Trường Giang | 1 November 1976 (aged 32) | | (Vietnam) Becamex Bình Dương |
| 11 | DF | Lê Quang Cường | 2 January 1983 (aged 25) | | (Vietnam) SHB Đà Nẵng |
| 12 | MF | Nguyễn Minh Phương | 5 July 1980 (aged 28) | | (Vietnam) Đồng Tâm Long An |
| 13 | FW | Nguyễn Quang Hải | 1 November 1985 (aged 23) | | (Vietnam) Khatoco Khánh Hòa |
| 14 | MF | Lê Tấn Tài | 4 January 1984 (aged 24) | | (Vietnam) Khatoco Khánh Hòa |
| 15 | GK | Bùi Quang Huy | 24 July 1982 (aged 26) | | (Vietnam) Nam Định |
| 16 | DF | Huỳnh Quang Thanh | 4 June 1984 (aged 24) | | (Vietnam) Becamex Bình Dương |
| 17 | MF | Nguyễn Vũ Phong | 6 February 1985 (aged 23) | | (Vietnam) Becamex Bình Dương |
| 18 | FW | Phan Thanh Bình | 1 November 1986 (aged 22) | | (Vietnam) TĐCS Đồng Tháp |
| 19 | FW | Phạm Thành Lương | 9 October 1988 (aged 20) | | (Vietnam) Hà Nội ACB |
| 20 | GK | Trần Đức Cường | 20 May 1985 (aged 23) | | (Vietnam) SHB Đà Nẵng |
| 21 | FW | Nguyễn Việt Thắng | 13 September 1981 (aged 27) | | (Vietnam) Đồng Tâm Long An |
| 22 | MF | Phan Văn Tài Em (c) | 23 April 1982 (aged 26) | | (Vietnam) Đồng Tâm Long An |

=== Laos ===
Head Coach: Saysana Savatdy

| No. | Pos. | Player | Date of birth (age) | Caps | Club |
|---|---|---|---|---|---|
| 1 | GK | Sengphachan Bounthisanh | 1 June 1987 (aged 21) | | (Laos) Vientiane |
| 2 | DF | Saynakhonevieng Phommapanya | 28 October 1987 (aged 21) | | (Laos) Vientiane |
| 3 | DF | Kitsada Thongkhen | 8 April 1987 (aged 21) | | (Laos) Lao Army |
| 4 | DF | Ketsada Souksavanh | 23 November 1992 (aged 16) | | (Laos) Lao Army |
| 5 | DF | Kovanh Namthavixay | 23 July 1987 (aged 21) | | (Laos) Lao Army |
| 6 | DF | Chandalaphone Liepvixay | 14 April 1986 (aged 22) | | (Laos) Vientiane |
| 7 | MF | Sounthalay Xaysongkham | 21 August 1987 (aged 21) | | (Laos) Lao Army |
| 8 | FW | Lamnao Singto | 15 April 1988 (aged 20) | | (Thailand) Raj Pracha |
| 9 | FW | Visay Phaphouvanin | 12 June 1985 (aged 23) | | (Laos) Vientiane |
| 10 | MF | Nicksand Somvong | 6 February 1987 (aged 21) | | (Laos) Lao-American College |
| 11 | FW | Viengsavanh Sayyaboun | 3 June 1989 (aged 19) | | (Laos) Savannakhet |
| 12 | MF | Phayvanh Louanglath | 8 March 1983 (aged 25) | | (Laos) Lao Army |
| 13 | MF | Kaysone Soukhavong | 7 June 1987 (aged 21) | | Bank of Laos |
| 14 | DF | Saychon Khunsamnarn | 19 July 1990 (aged 18) | | (Laos) Lao Army |
| 16 | DF | Vongphet Sylisay | 7 September 1988 (aged 20) | | (Laos) Phongsali |
| 17 | MF | Sangvone Phimmasen | 16 November 1989 (aged 19) | | (Laos) Ezra |
| 18 | DF | Keovisiane Keovilay | 1 November 1983 (aged 25) | | |
| 20 | GK | Souvanpheng Phanthavong | | | |
| 22 | GK | Toulakham Sitthidaphone | 19 October 1986 (aged 22) | | (Laos) Lao Army |
