= 2008 AFF Championship final =

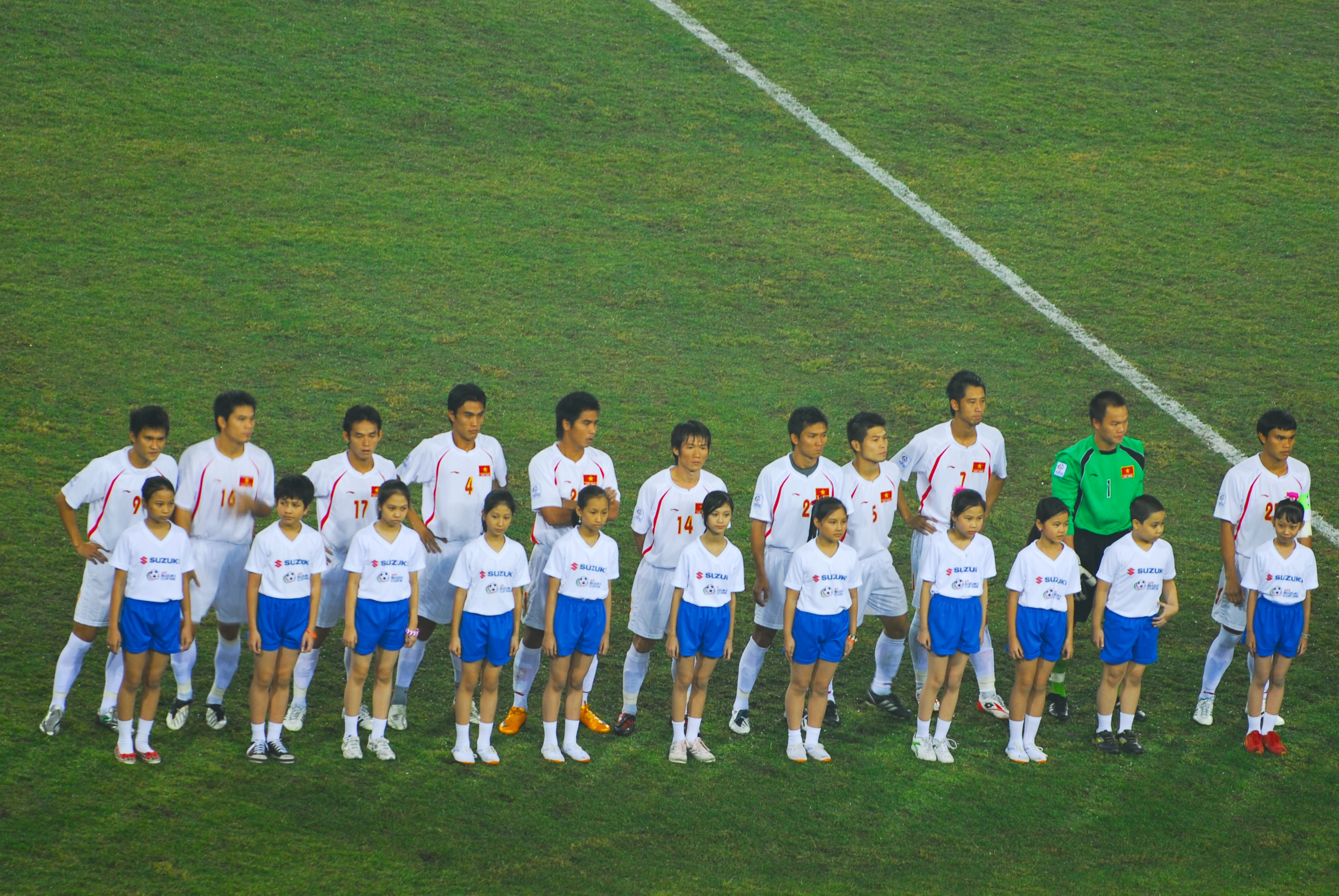
- Vietnam players lining up before the second leg on 28 December 2008
- Event: 2008 AFF Championship
Thailand	Vietnam
(Thailand)	(Vietnam)
2	3
- on aggregate

First leg
Thailand	Vietnam
1	2
- Date: 24 December 2008
- Venue: Rajamangala Stadium, Bangkok
- Man of the Match: Nguyễn Vũ Phong (Vietnam)
- Referee: Ramachandran Krishnan (Malaysia)
- Attendance: 50,000
- Weather: Clear sky

Second leg
Vietnam	Thailand
1	1
- Date: 28 December 2008
- Venue: Mỹ Đình National Stadium, Hanoi
- Man of the Match: Nguyễn Minh Phương (Vietnam)
- Referee: Abdul Malik (Singapore)
- Attendance: 40,000
- Weather: Cold

The 2008 AFF Championship final was the final match of the 2008 AFF Championship organised by the ASEAN Football Federation (AFF). The match was played over two legs between Vietnam and Thailand. The first leg was held at the Rajamangala Stadium in Bangkok on 24 December, while the second leg was held at the Mỹ Đình National Stadium in Hanoi on 28 December 2008.

Vietnam won the final with a total score of 3–2 after both matches to become the AFF Cup champion for the first time in history, since the tournament was renamed in 2007. This victory of the Vietnamese team was ranked by the website Goal.com as one of the top 10 outstanding Asian football events of 2008, as well as voted by Vietnamnet readers as one of the top 10 outstanding events of Vietnam in the year. This victory marked the first time Vietnam won a regional tournament, and the first time in 10 years since Vietnam lost in the final of the 1998 Tiger Cup.

== Background ==
=== Vietnam ===
Ahead of the 2008 AFF Championship, Vietnam entered the tournament with high expectations but also a lot of pressure. A year earlier, the team had made a big splash when, for the first time in history, they advanced past the group stage of an AFC Asian Cup and reached the quarter-finals after an impressive 2–0 victory over the United Arab Emirates. The achievement at the 2007 AFC Asian Cup was considered an important milestone, helping Vietnamese football affirm its new position in the continental arena and receive great attention from the regional media.

However, at that time, Vietnamese football was still in the process of recovery and reconstruction after the match-fixing scandal involving a number of players of the U-23 team at the 2005 SEA Games. This incident severely affected the image of the team, forcing the Vietnam Football Federation (VFF) to carry out a series of reforms in organization, management and player training. In that context, many youth football academies were established to systematically develop the next generation of human resources, notably the Hoang Anh Gia Lai - Arsenal JMG Academy established in 2007.

Despite never having won the AFF Cup before, the Vietnamese team entered the tournament with great confidence from domestic fans, based on their improved performance from the Asian Cup and their determination to assert their position after a long period of internal pressure. That context created a strong motivation for the team to aim for the highest goal in this tournament.

=== Thailand ===
Before the 2008 AFF Cup, the Thai team entered the tournament as co-hosts, planning to hold the group stage matches in Bangkok. However, the unstable political situation in the capital forced the Organizing Committee to move all these matches to Phuket on November 29, 2008. Organizing the tournament manually like that further increased the professional pressure on the Thai team.

In terms of force, after being unable to advance deep in the World Cup qualifiers (losing in the third group stage), coach Charnwit Polcheewin officially resigned on June 25, 2008. Peter Reid—former England manager—was then appointed on 23 July, set to take up the role on 1 September, also taking charge of the U20 team. The 2008 AFF Cup campaign was an opportunity for Thailand to win the championship for the 8th time in history, following the previous 7 championships.

== Route to the final ==
Note: In all results below, the finalist's score is given first. (H: Home, A: Away)

Thailand				Round	Vietnam			
Opponent	Score			Group stage	Opponent	Score		
Vietnam	2–0			Match 1	Thailand	0–2		
Laos	6–0			Match 2	Malaysia	3–2		
Malaysia	3–0			Match 3	Laos	4–0		
First in Group B: Pos / Team / Pld / Pts; 1 / Thailand (H) / 3 / 9; 2 / Vietnam / 3 / 6; 3 / Malaysia / 3 / 3; 4 / Laos / 3 / 0; Source: AFF (H) Hosts				Final standings	Second in Group B: Pos / Team / Pld / Pts; 1 / Thailand (H) / 3 / 9; 2 / Vietnam / 3 / 6; 3 / Malaysia / 3 / 3; 4 / Laos / 3 / 0; Source: AFF (H) Hosts			
Opponent	AGG	1st leg	2nd leg	Knockout stage	Opponent	AGG	1st leg	2nd leg
Indonesia	3–1	1–0 (A)	2–1 (H)	Semi-final	Singapore	1–0	0–0 (H)	1–0 (A)

=== Thailand ===
Thailand were drawn into Group B along with Vietnam, Malaysia and Laos. The group stage of Group B was originally scheduled to be held in Bangkok, however due to the unstable political situation, the ASEAN Football Federation (AFF) moved all matches to Phuket province. Under the guidance of coach Peter Reid, the Thai team showed superior performance compared to the opponents in the same group.

In the opening match, Thailand defeated Vietnam 2–0, thereby creating a big advantage in the race for a ticket to the next round. Next, the team beat Laos 6–0 in the second match, before ending the group stage with a 3–0 victory over Malaysia. After 3 matches, Thailand won 9 absolute points, scored 11 goals and conceded none, thereby topping Group B with an outstanding goal difference. In the semi-finals, Thailand met Indonesia – the runner-up in Group A. In the first leg in Jakarta, the away team won 1–0 thanks to the ability to control the game and make good use of set pieces. In the second leg at home, Thailand continued to show their superiority and won 2–1. With a total score of 3-1 after two matches, Thailand has appeared in an AFF Cup final for the seventh time.

=== Vietnam ===
Vietnam were also in Group B, and opened the tournament with a match against Thailand, a rival with many ties in the region. Despite starting the match with determination, Vietnam lost 0–2 in this match. However, coach Henrique Calisto’s team did not let the initial defeat affect the overall spirit of the team. In the second match, Vietnam faced Malaysia and won a thrilling 3-2 victory, opening up great hope for a ticket to the semi-finals. In the final match, the team played convincingly and defeated Laos 4–0, closing the group stage with 6 points. With this achievement, Vietnam ranked second in Group B, after Thailand, and won the right to continue.

In the semi-finals, Vietnam faced Singapore, the defending champion and host of Group A. The first leg at My Dinh Stadium ended with a score of 0–0 in a tight and calculating match. In the second leg at the Singapore National Stadium, Vietnam surprisingly won 1–0 thanks to the decisive goal of striker Nguyen Quang Hai. With this result, Vietnam entered the AFF Cup final for the second time in history.

== Matches ==
=== First leg ===
24 December 2008
19:30 UTC+7

Thailand	1–2	Vietnam
Dương Hồng Sơn 75' (o.g.)	Report	Nguyễn Vũ Phong 40'; Lê Công Vinh 42'

Rajamangala Stadium, Bangkok
Attendance: 50,000
Referee: Ramachandran Krishnan (Malaysia)

Thailand	Vietnam

GK	18	Kosin Hathairattanakool
RB	2	Suree Sukha
CB	4	Chonlatit Jantakam
CB	6	Nattaporn Phanrit
LB	12	Natthaphong Samana
CM	15	Surat Sukha	(yellow card) 63'
CM	19	Pichitphong Choeichiu
RW	14	Teeratep Winothai		(substituted off) 75'
AM	7	Datsakorn Thonglao (c)
LW	17	Sutee Suksomkit
CF	10	Teerasil Dangda
Substitutes:
GK	1	Kittisak Rawangpa
DF	3	Patiparn Phetphun
DF	5	Niweat Siriwong
MF	16	Arthit Sunthornpit	(yellow card) 80'
MF	21	Salahudin Arware
MF	22	Rangsan Viwatchaichok
FW	9	Ronnachai Rangsiyo		(substituted on) 75'
FW	11	Tana Chanabut
FW	13	Anon Sangsanoi
Manager:
(England) Peter Reid

GK	1	Dương Hồng Sơn
RB	16	Huỳnh Quang Thanh
CB	4	Lê Phước Tứ
CB	7	Vũ Như Thành
LB	2	Đoàn Việt Cường
CM	22	Phan Văn Tài Em (c)
CM	5	Nguyễn Minh Châu
CM	14	Lê Tấn Tài	(yellow card) 3'
AM	17	Nguyễn Vũ Phong
CF	21	Nguyễn Việt Thắng		(substituted off) 66'
CF	9	Lê Công Vinh
Substitutes:
GK	20	Trần Đức Cường
DF	3	Nguyễn Minh Đức
MF	10	Trần Trường Giang
MF	12	Nguyễn Minh Phương
FW	8	Thạch Bảo Khanh
FW	13	Nguyễn Quang Hải		(substituted on) 66'
FW	18	Phan Thanh Bình
FW	19	Phạm Thành Lương
Manager:
(Portugal) Henrique Calisto

Player of the Match:
Nguyễn Vũ Phong (Vietnam)

=== Second leg ===
28 December 2008
19:30 UTC+7

Vietnam	1–1	Thailand
Lê Công Vinh 90+4'	Report	Teerasil 21'

Mỹ Đình National Stadium, Hanoi
Attendance: 40,000
Referee: Abdul Malik (Singapore)

Vietnam	Thailand

GK	1	Dương Hồng Sơn
RB	16	Huỳnh Quang Thanh
CB	4	Lê Phước Tứ
CB	7	Vũ Như Thành
LB	2	Đoàn Việt Cường		(substituted off) 90'
CM	22	Phan Văn Tài Em (c)	(yellow card) 8'
CM	5	Nguyễn Minh Châu		(substituted off) 60'
CM	14	Lê Tấn Tài
AM	17	Nguyễn Vũ Phong
CF	21	Nguyễn Việt Thắng
CF	9	Lê Công Vinh
Substitutes:
GK	20	Trần Đức Cường
DF	3	Nguyễn Minh Đức
DF	11	Lê Quang Cường		(substituted on) 90'
MF	10	Trần Trường Giang
MF	12	Nguyễn Minh Phương		(substituted on) 60'
FW	8	Thạch Bảo Khanh
FW	13	Nguyễn Quang Hải
FW	18	Phan Thanh Bình
FW	19	Phạm Thành Lương
Manager:
(Portugal) Henrique Calisto

GK	18	Kosin Hathairattanakool
RB	2	Suree Sukha
CB	4	Chonlatit Jantakam
CB	6	Nattaporn Phanrit
LB	12	Natthaphong Samana
CM	15	Surat Sukha	(yellow card) 58'
CM	8	Suchao Nuchnum
RW	14	Teeratep Winothai		(substituted off) 68'
AM	7	Datsakorn Thonglao (c)
LW	17	Sutee Suksomkit
CF	10	Teerasil Dangda
Substitutes:
GK	1	Kittisak Rawangpa
DF	3	Patiparn Phetphun
DF	5	Niweat Siriwong
MF	16	Arthit Sunthornpit
MF	19	Pichitphong Choeichiu
MF	21	Salahudin Arware
MF	22	Rangsan Viwatchaichok
FW	9	Ronnachai Rangsiyo		(substituted on) 68'
FW	13	Anon Sangsanoi
Manager:
(England) Peter Reid

Player of the match:
Nguyễn Minh Phương (Vietnam)

Vietnam won 3–2 on aggregate.

== Post-match ==
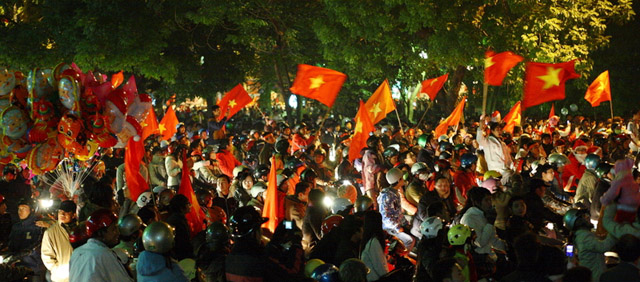
Hanoi people took to the streets to celebrate after Vietnam won the championship.

After a 1–1 draw in the second leg at My Dinh Stadium, with a total score of 3–2, the Vietnamese team officially won their first 2008 AFF Championship.

The goal by Lê Công Vinh from a free kick by Minh Phương was named as the "golden goal" by the media and became associated with Công Vinh. Công Vinh also scored in the first leg, helping Vietnam win 2-1 in Thailand.

After the match ended, Prime Minister Nguyễn Tấn Dũng personally presented the championship trophy to captain Phan Văn Tài Em. During the award ceremony, goalkeeper Dương Hồng Sơn was honored as the Most Valuable Player (MVP) of the tournament.

"My Dinh Stadium exploded, I took off my shirt and ran crazily to the sidelines, in the happiest moment of my life. I would never trade that feeling for anything else. Bursting, relieved, happy, satisfied, all rolled into one. I only scored two goals in the entire tournament, and those were in the two finals. How could I ever fully express my gratitude to the wonderful teacher who was by my side, my teammates who fought side by side in the life-and-death matches, and those passionate fans? They were the most difficult people, but also the most lovable. I just kept running, letting my feet take me wherever they wanted. It took me a while to regain my composure and return to the pitch so the match could start again. I frantically searched for my shirt that had accidentally fallen somewhere. A teammate gave me a spare shirt, but that was no longer important. Before I could put it on, the referee blew the whistle to end the match. I have never heard a whistle so... lovely."

— "Minute 89" (autobiography), Le Cong Vinh, published in 2018.

Following the victory, public celebrations were reported across Vietnam, with large crowds gathering in major cities and provincial areas such as Hanoi and Ho Chi Minh City. Similar celebrations were also reported in cities including Huế, Quảng Ngãi, Hội An, Nha Trang, and Cần Thơ.

Domestic and international media quickly called this a “miracle”, as this was the first time Vietnam had won a regional tournament. The press evaluated Cong Vinh’s “last minute” header as a symbol of Vietnam’s hope, determination and bravery.

== See also ==
- 2008 AFF Championship
- Lê Công Vinh
