= Vietnam at the ASEAN Championship =

Vietnam national football team's regional tournament record

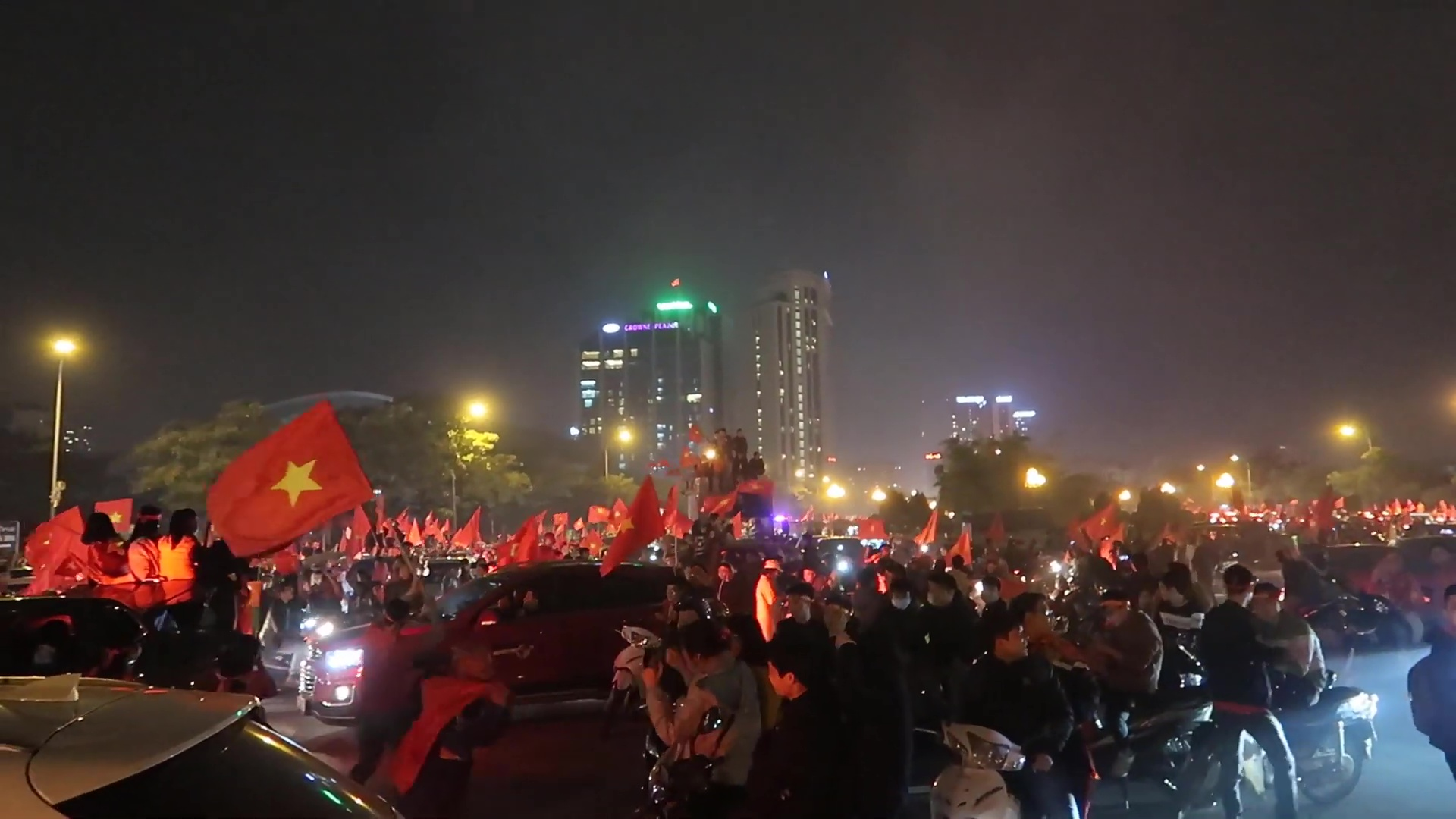
- Hanoi people took to the streets to celebrate Vietnam's second AFF Championship win in December 15, 2018.

Basic information
- Competition: ASEAN Championship
- Country: Vietnam
- Sport: Association football
- Team level: National team

Competition process
Medal
W	RU	3rd	Total
4	2	7	13
- First season: 1996
- Total season: 16
- Game played: 92
- Record (W–D–L): 51–25–16
- Goals for: 205
- Goals against: 87
- Notable matches: 2008 Final; 2018 Final; 2024 Final; 2026 final

Team record
- Best result: Champions (2008, 2018, 2024, 2026)
- Worst result: Group stage (2004, 2012)
- Other record: x5 MVP Award (1998, 2008, 2018, 2024, 2026); x3 Top scorer (2022, 2026); x1 Fair Play Award (2014)

The Vietnam national football team, representing a unified Vietnam since 1975, participated in the ASEAN Championship for the first time in 1996 AFF Championship, the first edition of the tournament held in Singapore. Since then, Vietnam has become one of the most successful teams in Southeast Asia's biggest football tournament.

Vietnam's national team has been coached by several foreign managers, including Karl-Heinz Weigang, Henrique Calisto, Park Hang-seo, and Kim Sang-sik. The team, nicknamed the "Golden Star Warriors", has won the AFF Championship four times, in 2008, 2018, 2024 and 2026, and has reached the semi-finals or final in most other editions of the tournament.

== History ==
In the inaugural tournament in 1996, Vietnam surprisingly won the bronze medal after defeating Indonesia. However, the most memorable moment during this period was the 1998 tournament held on home soil. Under the guidance of coach Alfred Riedl, the first "Golden Generation," featuring players like Nguyễn Hồng Sơn and Lê Huỳnh Đức, defeated Thailand 3-0 in the semi-finals. Despite this, Vietnam suffered a heartbreaking 0-1 defeat to Singapore in the final due to a goal by Sasi Kumar's shoulder, missing out on their first championship title. In the 2000, 2002, and 2004 tournaments, the team maintained consistent performance but often stopped at the semi-finals or group stage.

2008 marked a historic milestone when Vietnam won the Southeast Asian Championship for the first time. After a difficult start in the group stage, coach Henrique Calisto's team played brilliantly, overcoming Singapore in the semi-finals before defeating Thailand with a 3-2 aggregate score over two legs in the final. Lê Công Vinh's header in the final minute of injury time at Mỹ Đình National Stadium became a classic moment in Vietnamese football. However, for almost a decade afterward (2010–2016), the team fell into a crisis and repeatedly lost in the semi-finals against Malaysia and Indonesia.

The arrival of South Korean manager Park Hang-seo at the end of 2017 completely changed the team's standing. At the 2018 AFF Championship, Vietnam demonstrated absolute dominance with a pragmatic and disciplined playing style. The team won their second championship after defeating Malaysia in the second leg of the final in Hanoi thanks to a single goal from Nguyễn Anh Đức. This was the tournament where Vietnam set a record for the longest clean sheet and affirmed their number one position in the region on the FIFA rankings.

At the 2020 tournament (held in 2021 due to the COVID-19 pandemic in Southeast Asia), Vietnam officially lost to Thailand in the semi-finals with a total score of 0–2. In 2022 – the final tournament under coach Park Hang-seo – the team reached the final but once again suffered a defeat against Thailand with a total score of 2–3, finishing as runners-up. After a turbulent transition period under coach Philippe Troussier, Vietnamese football entered a new era under the leadership of strategist Kim Sang-sik.

The turning point occurred at the 2024 ASEAN Championship. After overcoming their long-standing rivals in the semi-finals, Vietnam advanced to the final and defeated Thailand to win their third Southeast Asian championship title. In the 2026 edition, Vietnam had produced a dominant performance throughout the tournament, and once again overcame Thailand in the final 4–2 on aggregate to win their fourth title, which marked the first time that the team had won consecutive titles.

== Overview ==
=== Record by season ===
ASEAN Championship record									Coach(es)
Year	Result	Pos.	Pld	W	D	L	GF	GA	—
(Singapore) 1996	Third place	3rd	6	3	2	1	14	10	(Germany) Karl-Heinz Weigang
(Vietnam) 1998	Runners-up	2/8	5	3	1	1	8	2	Alfred Riedl
(Thailand) 2000	Fourth place	4th	6	3	1	2	14	6	(Austria) Alfred Riedl
(Indonesia) (Singapore) 2002	Third place	3rd	6	4	1	1	21	12	(Portugal) Henrique Calisto
(Malaysia) (Vietnam) 2004	Group stage	6th	4	2	1	1	13	5	(Brazil) Edson Tavares, (Vietnam) Trần Văn Khánh
(Singapore) (Thailand) 2007	Semi-finals	3rd	5	1	3	1	10	3	(Austria) Alfred Riedl
(Indonesia) (Thailand) 2008	Champions	1/8	7	4	2	1	11	6	(Portugal) Henrique Calisto
(Indonesia) (Vietnam) 2010	Semi-finals	3rd	5	2	1	2	8	5	(Portugal) Henrique Calisto
(Malaysia) (Thailand) 2012	Group stage	6th	3	0	1	2	2	5	(Vietnam) Phan Thanh Hùng
(Singapore) (Vietnam) 2014	Semi-finals	3/8	5	3	1	1	12	8	(Japan) Toshiya Miura
(Myanmar) (Philippines) 2016	Semi-finals	3rd	5	3	1	1	8	6	(Vietnam) Nguyễn Hữu Thắng
(ASEAN) 2018	Champions	1/10	8	6	2	0	15	4	(South Korea) Park Hang-seo
(Singapore) 2020	Semi-finals	3/10	6	3	2	1	9	2	(South Korea) Park Hang-seo
(ASEAN) 2022	Runners-up	2nd	8	4	3	1	16	3	(South Korea) Park Hang-seo
(ASEAN) 2024	Champions	1st	8	7	1	0	21	6	(South Korea) Kim Sang-sik
(ASEAN) 2026	Champions	1st	8	6	2	0	21	5	(South Korea) Kim Sang-sik
Total	4 titles	16/16	95	54	25	16	203	87	—

=== Team records ===
Vietnam's ASEAN Championship record
First match	Vietnam 3–1 Cambodia (2 September 1996; Jurong, Singapore)
Biggest win	Vietnam 9–0 Laos (17 January 2007; Jalan Besar, Singapore)
Biggest defeat	Vietnam 0–4 Thailand (27 December 2002; Jakarta, Indonesia)
Best result	Champions in 2008, 2018, 2024 and 2026
Worst result	6th in 2004 and 2012 (group stage)

=== Season game log ===
Legend
Vietnam win
Opponent win
Match draw

Matches and results from 1996 to 2007
(Winner: 0, Runner-up: 1, Third place: 3)
1996 AFF Championship (Result: Third place)

Match	Opponent	Date	Score	Goal	Assist(s)	Venue Attendance
M1	Cambodia	September 2	W 3–1	Trần Công Minh 21'; Lê Huỳnh Đức 30'; Võ Hoàng Bửu 80' (pen.)	N/A	Jurong Stadium; 2,800
M2	Laos	September 5	D 1–1	Lê Huỳnh Đức 85'	N/A	Jurong Stadium; 1,400
M3	Myanmar	September 7	W 4–1	Nguyễn Hữu Đang 6'; Lê Huỳnh Đức 15'; Trần Công Minh 48'; Nguyễn Hồng Sơn 63'	N/A	Jurong Stadium; 2000
M4	Indonesia	September 11	D 1–1	Võ Hoàng Bửu 77' (pen.)	Unassisted	Jurong Stadium; 1,300
SF	Thailand	September 13	L 2–4	Võ Hoàng Bửu 83' (pen.); Nguyễn Hồng Sơn 88'	N/A	National Stadium; 20,000

1998 AFF Championship (Result: Runner-up)

Match	Opponent	Date	Score	Goal	Assist(s)	Venue Attendance
M1	Laos	August 26	W 4–1	Nguyễn Hồng Sơn 30'; Nguyễn Văn Sỹ 43'; Lê Huỳnh Đức 85', 90'	N/A	Hàng Đẫy Stadium; 20,000
M2	Singapore	August 28	D 0–0	No goals	No assists	Hàng Đẫy Stadium; 15,000
M3	Malaysia	August 30	W 1–0	Nguyễn Hồng Sơn 50'	N/A	Hàng Đẫy Stadium; 15,000
SF	Thailand	September 3	W 3–0	Trương Việt Hoàng 15'; Nguyễn Hồng Sơn 70'; Văn Sỹ Hùng 80'	N/A	Hàng Đẫy Stadium; 23,000
F	Singapore	September 5	L 0–1	No goals	No assists	Hàng Đẫy Stadium; 25,000

2000 AFF Championship (Result: Fourth place)

Match	Opponent	Date	Score	Goal	Assist(s)	Venue Attendance
M1	Malaysia	November 5	D 0–0	No goals	No assists	Tinsulanon Stadium; N/A
M2	Cambodia	November 7	W 6–0	Lê Huỳnh Đức 16', 80'; Nguyễn Văn Sỹ 55'; Nguyễn Hồng Sơn 58'; Vũ Công Tuyền 74', 86'	N/A	Tinsulanon Stadium; N/A
M3	Singapore	November 11	W 1–0	Lê Huỳnh Đức 62'	N/A	Tinsulanon Stadium; N/A
M4	Laos	November 13	W 5–0	Văn Sỹ Thủy 8'; Vũ Công Tuyền 18'; Nguyễn Văn Sỹ 50'; Vũ Minh Hiếu 61'; Phạm Hùng Dũng 88'	N/A	Tinsulanon Stadium; N/A
SF	Indonesia	November 16	L 2–3 (a.e.t.)	Nguyễn Hồng Sơn 45'; Vũ Công Tuyền 60'	N/A	Rajamangala Stadium; N/A
3rd	Malaysia	November 18	L 0–3	No goals	No assists	Rajamangala Stadium; N/A

2002 AFF Championship (Result: Third place)

Match	Opponent	Date	Score	Goal	Assist(s)	Venue Attendance
M1	Cambodia	December 15	W 9–2	Huỳnh Hồng Sơn 11; Trần Trường Giang 16', 40'; Nguyễn Quốc Trung 24'; Lê Huỳnh Đức 63', 80'; Nguyễn Minh Phương 75'; Trịnh Xuân Thành 88'; Phạm Văn Quyến 90'	N/A	Gelora Bung Karno Stadium; N/A
M2	Philippines	December 19	W 4–1	Huỳnh Hồng Sơn 60', 72'; Lê Huỳnh Đức 68' (pen.), 79'	N/A	Gelora Bung Karno Stadium; N/A
M3	Indonesia	December 21	D 2–2	Phan Văn Tài Em 53'; Lê Huỳnh Đức 59'	N/A	Gelora Bung Karno Stadium; N/A
M4	Myanmar	December 23	W 4–2	Trịnh Xuân Thành 38'; Đặng Phương Nam 48', 66'; Lê Huỳnh Đức 72' (pen.)	N/A	Gelora Bung Karno Stadium; N/A
SF	Thailand	December 27	L 0–4	No goals	No assists	Gelora Bung Karno Stadium; N/A
3rd	Malaysia	December 29	W 2–1	Trần Trường Giang 45'; Nguyễn Minh Phương 59'	N/A	Gelora Bung Karno Stadium; N/A

2004 AFF Championship (Result: Group stage)

Match	Opponent	Date	Score	Goal	Assist(s)	Venue Attendance
M1	Singapore	December 7	D 1–1	Thạch Bảo Khanh 51'	Phan Văn Tài Em 51'	Thống Nhất Stadium; N/A
M2	Cambodia	December 9	W 9–1	Thạch Bảo Khanh 9', 23'; Lê Công Vinh 57', 86', 89'; Sun Sampratna 63' (o.g.); Đặng Văn Thành 71', 83'; Nguyễn Huy Hoàng 76'	Lê Công Vinh 8', 24'; Thạch Bảo Khanh 71'; Nguyễn Minh Phương 76', 83'; Lê Hồng Minh 86'; Phan Thanh Bình 89'	Thống Nhất Stadium; N/A
M3	Indonesia	December 13	L 0–3	No goals	No assists	Mỹ Đình National Stadium; N/A
M4	Laos	December 15	W 3–0	Lê Công Vinh 9'; Nguyễn Minh Phương 42'; Thạch Bảo Khanh 75'	Nguyễn Minh Phương 9', 75'; Thạch Bảo Khanh, Nguyễn Đức Thắng 42'	Mỹ Đình National Stadium; N/A

2007 AFF Championship* (Result: Semi-finals)

Match	Opponent	Date	Score	Goal	Assist(s)	Venue Attendance
M1	Singapore	January 13	D 0–0	No goals	No assists	National Stadium; 20,000
M2	Indonesia	January 15	D 1–1	Supardi Nasir 35' (o.g.)	No assists	National Stadium; 4,500
M3	Laos	January 17	W 9–0	Lê Công Vinh 1', 28', 58'; Phan Thanh Bình 29', 73' (pen.), 81', 84'; Nguyễn Văn Biển 45', 90'	Lê Hồng Minh 28'; Nguyễn Minh Phương 45'	Jalan Besar Stadium; 1,005
SF (1st leg)	Thailand	January 24	L 0–2	No goals	No assists	Mỹ Đình National Stadium; 40,000
SF (2nd leg)	Thailand	January 28	D 0–0 (agg. 0–2)	No goals	No assists	Suphachalasai Stadium; 35,000

* For some reason, the tournament was held in 2007 instead of 2006 as originally planned.

Matches and results from 2008 to 2018
(Winner: 2, Runner-up: 0, Third place: 3)
2008 AFF Championship (Result: Winner)

Match	Opponent	Date	Score	Goal	Assist(s)	Venue Attendance
M1	Thailand	December 6	L 0–2	No goals	No assists	Surakul Stadium; 20,000
M2	Malaysia	December 8	W 3–2	Phạm Thành Lương 16'; Nguyễn Vũ Phong 72', 86'	N/A	Surakul Stadium; N/A
M3	Laos	December 10	W 4–0	Nguyễn Việt Thắng 48'; Phạm Thành Lương 63'; Huỳnh Quang Thanh 66'; Phan Thanh Bình 80'	Nguyễn Vũ Phong 48'; Nguyễn Minh Phương 66'	Surakul Stadium; N/A
SF (1st leg)	Singapore	December 17	D 0–0	No goals	No assists	Mỹ Đình National Stadium; 40,000
SF (2nd leg)	Singapore	December 21	W 1–0 (agg. 1–0)	Nguyễn Quang Hải 75'	Lê Công Vinh 75'	National Stadium; 55,000
F (1st leg)	Thailand	December 24	W 2–1	Nguyễn Vũ Phong 40'; Lê Công Vinh 42'	Lê Tấn Tài 40'; Nguyễn Việt Thắng 42'	Rajamangala Stadium; 50,000
F (2nd leg)	Thailand	December 28	D 1–1 (agg. 3–2)	Lê Công Vinh 90+4'	Nguyễn Minh Phương 90+4	Mỹ Đình National Stadium; 40,000

2010 AFF Championship (Result: Semi-finals)

Match	Opponent	Date	Score	Goal	Assist(s)	Venue Attendance
M1	Myanmar	December 2	W 7–1	Nguyễn Anh Đức 13', 56'; Nguyễn Minh Phương 30'; Lê Tấn Tài 51'; Nguyễn Trọng Hoàng 73', 83'; Nguyễn Vũ Phong 90+4	Phạm Thành Lương 56'; Nguyễn Vũ Phong 67'; Đoàn Việt Cường 90+4	Mỹ Đình National Stadium; 40,000
M2	Philippines	December 5	L 0–2	No scored	Unassisted	Mỹ Đình National Stadium; 40,000
M3	Singapore	December 8	W 1–0	Nguyễn Vũ Phong 32'	Huỳnh Quang Thanh, Nguyễn Trọng Hoàng, Phạm Thành Lương 32'	Mỹ Đình National Stadium; 40,000
SF (1st-leg)	Malaysia	December 15	L 0–2	No goals	No assists	Bukit Jalil National Stadium; 45,000
SF (2nd leg)	Malaysia	December 18	D 0–0 (agg. 0–2)	No goals	No assists	Mỹ Đình National Stadium; 40,000

2012 AFF Championship (Result: Group stage)

Match	Opponent	Date	Score	Goal	Assist(s)	Venue Attendance
M1	Myanmar	November 24	D 1–1	Lê Tấn Tài 34'	Phạm Thành Lương 34'	Rajamangala Stadium; N/A
M2	Philippines	November 27	L 0–1	No goals	No assists	Rajamangala Stadium; N/A
M3	Thailand	November 30	L 1–3	Nguyễn Văn Quyết 72'	N/A	Rajamangala Stadium; N/A

2014 AFF Championship (Result: Semi-finals)

Match	Opponent	Date	Score	Goal	Assist(s)	Venue Attendance
M1	Indonesia	November 22	D 2–2	Quế Ngọc Hải 11'; Lê Công Vinh 68'	Nguyễn Văn Quyết 68'	Mỹ Đình National Stadium; 40,000
M2	Laos	November 25	W 3–0	Vũ Minh Tuấn 27'; Lê Công Vinh 84'; Nguyễn Huy Hùng 88'	Lê Tấn Tài 27'; Nguyễn Văn Quyết 88'	Mỹ Đình National Stadium; N/A
M3	Philippines	November 28	W 3–1	Ngô Hoàng Thịnh 9'; Vũ Minh Tuấn 50'; Phạm Thành Lương 58'	Lê Công Vinh 9'; Ngô Hoàng Thịnh 50'	Mỹ Đình National Stadium; N/A
SF (1st leg)	Malaysia	December 7	W 2–1	Võ Huy Toàn 32'; Nguyễn Văn Quyết 60'	N/A	Shah Alam Stadium; N/A
SF (2nd leg)	Malaysia	December 11	L 2–4 (agg. 4–5)	Lê Công Vinh 22' (pen.), 79'	N/A	Mỹ Đình National Stadium; N/A

2016 AFF Championship (Result: Semi-finals)

Match	Opponent	Date	Score	Goal	Assist(s)	Venue Attendance
M1	Myanmar	November 20	W 2–1	Nguyễn Văn Quyết 24'; Lê Công Vinh 80'	Lương Xuân Trường 24'; Nguyễn Trọng Hoàng 80'	Thuwunna Stadium; 28,040
M2	Malaysia	November 23	W 1–0	Nguyễn Trọng Hoàng 80'	Lương Xuân Trường 80'	Thuwunna Stadium; 2,542
M3	Cambodia	November 26	W 2–1	Lê Công Vinh 20'; Nub Tola 50' (o.g.)	Nguyễn Văn Toàn 20'	Wunna Theikdi Stadium; 685
SF (1st leg)	Indonesia	December 3	L 1–2	Nguyễn Văn Quyết 17' (pen.)	No assists	Pakansari Stadium; 30,000
SF (2nd leg)	Indonesia	December 7	D 2–2 (a.e.t.) (agg. 2–3)	Vũ Văn Thanh 83'; Vũ Minh Tuấn 90+3'	Phạm Thành Lương 83'	Mỹ Đình National Stadium; 40,000

(ASEAN) 2018 AFF Championship (Result: Winner)

Match	Opponent	Date	Score	Goal	Assist(s)	Venue Attendance
M1	Laos	November 8	W 3–0	Nguyễn Công Phượng 11'; Nguyễn Anh Đức 45+2'; Nguyễn Quang Hải 68'	Đoàn Văn Hậu 11'	New Laos National Stadium; 11,000
M2	Malaysia	November 16	W 2–0	Nguyễn Công Phượng 11'; Nguyễn Anh Đức 60'	Lương Xuân Trường, Phan Văn Đức 60'	Mỹ Đình National Stadium; 40,000
M3	Myanmar	November 20	D 0–0	No goals	No assists	Thuwunna Stadium; 29,954
M4	Cambodia	November 24	W 3–0	Nguyễn Tiến Linh 39'; Nguyễn Quang Hải 41'; Phan Văn Đức 61'	Nguyễn Trọng Hoàng 39'; Nguyễn Phong Hồng Duy 41'; Nguyễn Quang Hải 61'	Hàng Đẫy Stadium; 14,000
SF (1st leg)	Philippines	December 2	W 2–1	Nguyễn Anh Đức 12'; Phan Văn Đức 48'	Đoàn Văn Hậu 12'; Nguyễn Trọng Hoàng 48'	Panaad Stadium; 5,489
SF (2nd leg)	Philippines	December 6	W 2–1 (agg. 4–2)	Nguyễn Quang Hải 84'; Nguyễn Công Phượng 87'	Phan Văn Đức 84'; Nguyễn Tiến Linh 87'	Mỹ Đình National Stadium; 38,816
F (1st leg)	Malaysia	December 11	D 2–2	Nguyễn Huy Hùng 22'; Phạm Đức Huy 25'	Đoàn Văn Hậu, Phan Văn Đức 22'; Phan Văn Đức 25'	Bukit Jalil National Stadium; 88,482
F (2nd leg)	Malaysia	December 15	W 1–0 (agg. 3–2)	Nguyễn Anh Đức 5'	Đoàn Văn Hậu, Nguyễn Quang Hải 5'	Mỹ Đình National Stadium; 44,625

Matches and result from 2020 to present
(Winner: 1, Runner-up: 1, Third place: 1)
2020 AFF Championship (in 2021^{1}) (Result: Third place)

Match	Opponent	Date	Score	Goal	Assist(s)	Venue Attendance
M1	Laos	December 6	W 2–0	Nguyễn Công Phượng 26'; Phan Văn Đức 55'	Nguyễn Hoàng Đức, Nguyễn Phong Hồng Duy 26'; Hồ Tấn Tài 55'	Bishan Stadium; 612
M2	Malaysia	December 12	W 3–0	Nguyễn Quang Hải 32'; Nguyễn Công Phượng 36'; Nguyễn Hoàng Đức 89'	Nguyễn Tuấn Anh, Nguyễn Hoàng Đức 32'; Nguyễn Quang Hải 36'; Nguyễn Tuấn Anh 89'	Bishan Stadium; 976
M3	Indonesia^{2}	December 15	D 0–0	No goals	No assists	Bishan Stadium; 928
M4	Cambodia	December 19	W 4–0	Nguyễn Tiến Linh 3', 27'; Bùi Tiến Dũng 55'; Nguyễn Quang Hải 57'	Nguyễn Quang Hải 3', 55'; Nguyễn Hoàng Đức 27', 57'	Bishan Stadium; 909
SF (1st leg)	Thailand^{2}	December 23	L 0–2	No goals	No assists	National Stadium; 7,355
SF (2nd leg)	Thailand^{2}	December 26	D 0–0 (agg. 0–2)	No goals	No assists	National Stadium; 8,121

2022 AFF Championship (Result: Runner-up)

Match	Opponent	Date	Score	Goal	Assist(s)	Venue Attendance
M1	Laos	December 21	W 6–0	Nguyễn Tiến Linh 15'; Đỗ Hùng Dũng 43'; Hồ Tấn Tài 55'; Đoàn Văn Hậu 58'; Nguyễn Văn Toàn 82'; Vũ Văn Thanh 90+1	Đoàn Văn Hậu 15'; Nguyễn Thành Chung 56'; Phạm Tuấn Hải 82'	New Laos National Stadium; 10,240
M2	Malaysia	December 27	W 3–0	Nguyễn Tiến Linh 28'; Quế Ngọc Hải 64' (pen.); Nguyễn Hoàng Đức 83'	Đỗ Hùng Dũng 28'; Nguyễn Quang Hải 83'	Mỹ Đình National Stadium; 17,545
M3	Singapore	December 30	D 0–0	No goals	No assists	Jalan Besar Stadium; 5,434
M4	Myanmar	January 3 (2023)	W 3–0	Kyaw Zin Lwin 8' (o.g.); Nguyễn Tiến Linh 27'; Châu Ngọc Quang 72'	Đoàn Văn Hậu 27'; Nguyễn Văn Quyết, Nguyễn Hoàng Đức 72'	Mỹ Đình National Stadium; 11,575
SF (1st leg)	Indonesia	January 6 (2023)	D 0–0	No goals	No assists	Gelora Bung Karno Stadium; 49,595
SF (2nd leg)	Indonesia	January 9 (2023)	W 2–0 (agg. 2–0)	Nguyễn Tiến Linh 3', 47'	Đỗ Hùng Dũng 3', 47'	Mỹ Đình National Stadium; 23,989
F (1st leg)	Thailand	January 13 (2023)	D 2–2	Nguyễn Tiến Linh 24'; Vũ Văn Thanh 88'	Quế Ngọc Hải 24'; Đinh Thanh Bình 87'	Mỹ Đình National Stadium; 38,539
F (2nd leg)	Thailand	January 16 (2023)	L 0–1	No goals	No assists	Thammasat Stadium; 19,306

2024 ASEAN Championship^{3} (Result: Winner)

Match	Opponent	Date	Score	Goal	Assist(s)	Venue Attendance
M1	Laos	December 9	W 4–1	Nguyễn Hai Long 58'; Nguyễn Tiến Linh 63'; Nguyễn Văn Toàn 69'; Nguyễn Văn Vĩ 82'	Bùi Tiến Dũng 58'; Nguyễn Quang Hải 63', 69'	New Laos National Stadium; 10,685
M3	Indonesia	December 15	W 1–0	Nguyễn Quang Hải 77'	Nguyễn Tiến Linh 77'	Việt Trì Stadium; 16,669
M4	Philippines	December 18	D 1–1	Doãn Ngọc Tân 90+7'	Unassisted	Rizal Memorial Stadium; 3,346
M5	Myanmar	December 21	W 5–0	Bùi Vĩ Hào 48'; Nguyễn Xuân Son 55', 90'; Nguyễn Quang Hải 74'; Nguyễn Tiến Linh 90+2'	Nguyễn Xuân Son 48', 90+2'; Bùi Vĩ Hào 55'; Hồ Tấn Tài 74'; Nguyễn Tiến Linh 90'	Việt Trì Stadium; 16,869
SF (1st leg)	Singapore	December 26	W 2–0	Nguyễn Tiến Linh 90+11 (pen.); Nguyễn Xuân Son 90+14	Phạm Xuân Mạnh 90+14	Jalan Besar Stadium; 5,223
SF (2nd leg)	Singapore	December 29	W 3–1 (agg. 5–1)	Nguyễn Xuân Son 45+1 (pen.), 63'; Nguyễn Tiến Linh 90+3 (pen.)	Nguyễn Hoàng Đức 63'	Việt Trì Stadium; 15,583
F (1st leg)	Thailand	January 2 (2025)	W 2–1	Nguyễn Xuân Son 59', 73'	Nguyễn Quang Hải, Vũ Văn Thanh 59'	Việt Trì Stadium; 15,604
F (2nd leg)	Thailand	January 5 (2025)	W 3–2 (agg. 5–3)	Phạm Tuấn Hải 8'; Pansa Hemviboon 82' (o.g.); Nguyễn Hai Long 90+20'	Phạm Xuân Mạnh 8'; Nguyễn Quang Hải 90+20'	Rajamangala Stadium; 46,982

2026 ASEAN Championship (Result: Winner)

Match	Opponent	Date	Score	Goal	Assist(s)	Venue Attendance
M1	Timor-Leste	July 24	W 7–0	Đỗ Hoàng Hên 7', 41'; Nguyễn Đình Bắc 31', 42', 65'; Nguyễn Xuân Son 45+1'; Nguyễn Quang Hải 79'	Nguyễn Hoàng Đức 31'; Nguyễn Quang Hải 42'; Nguyễn Văn Vĩ 45+1'; Bùi Hoàng Việt Anh 65'; Nguyễn Đình Bắc 79'	Chonburi Stadium; 195
M2	Singapore	July 31	D 0–0			Mỹ Đình National Stadium; 31,569
M3	Indonesia	August 3	W 3–0	Nguyễn Văn Vĩ 6'; Nguyễn Hai Long 15'; Nguyễn Xuân Son 71'	Nguyễn Hoàng Đức 6', 71'; Lê Phạm Thành Long 15'	Pakansari Stadium; 27,265
M4	Cambodia	August 7	W 3–1	Nguyễn Đình Bắc 18', 89'; Vakhim 84' (o.g.)	Nguyễn Hoàng Đức 18'; Lê Phạm Thành Long 89'	Mỹ Đình National Stadium; 19,628
SF (1st leg)	Malaysia	August 16	W 2–0	Nguyễn Xuân Son 45+5'; Faris Danish 86' (o.g.)	Trương Tiến Anh 45+5'	Kuala Lumpur Stadium; 10,141
SF (2nd leg)	Malaysia	August 19	W 2–0 (agg. 4–0)	Nguyễn Xuân Son 62', 89'	Nguyễn Đình Bắc 89'	Mỹ Đình National Stadium; 37,966
F (1st leg)	Thailand	August 22	W 2–0	Nguyễn Hai Long 62'; Nguyễn Quang Hải 69'	Nguyễn Đình Bắc 62'; Đỗ Hoàng Hên 69'	Rajamangala Stadium; 26,415
F (2nd leg)	Thailand	August 26	D 2–2 (agg. 4–2)	Budprom 52' (o.g.); Wanchai 90+3' (o.g.)		Mỹ Đình National Stadium; 38,646

^{1} Due to COVID-19 pandemic in Southeast Asia, the 2020 tournament was postponed to 2021, but the tournament name remained unchanged.
^{2} (For 2020 tournament) Due to non-compliance with conditions set by the World Anti-Doping Agency (WADA), Indonesia and Thailand was not allowed to be represented by its national flag. The sanctions took effect in October 2021.
^{3} From 2024, the competition will be rebranded as the ASEAN Championship.

== Outstanding season ==
Vietnam had three outstanding seasons in 2008, 2018, and 2024, winning the championship in all three.

=== 2008 AFF Championship ===
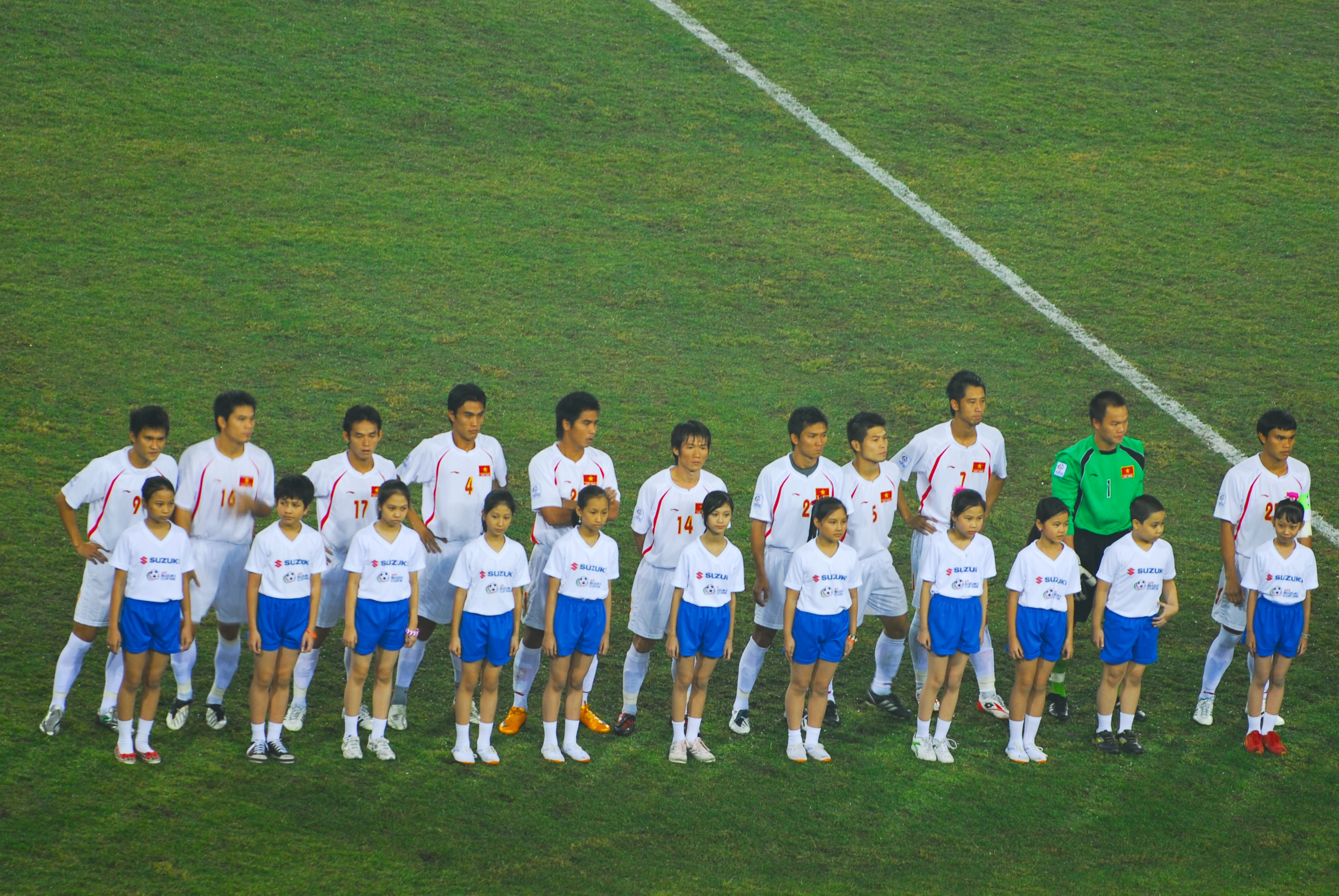
Vietnam national football team at the second leg match on December 28, 2008.

In 2008 AFF Championship, Vietnam was placed in Group B alongside with Thailand, Malaysia, and Laos. The team entered the tournament under immense pressure after a streak of 11 consecutive matches without a win under coach Henrique Calisto. In their opening match in Phuket, Vietnam lost 0–2 to hosts Thailand, raising concerns about their chances of advancing. However, in the second match, Vietnam secured a dramatic 3–2 victory against Malaysia thanks to a decisive goal from nearly 40 meters by Nguyen Vu Phong and a mistake by the opposing goalkeeper. A resounding 4–0 win against Laos in the final match secured Vietnam's place in the semi-finals as the second-placed team in Group B.

Vietnam's opponent in the semi-finals was the defending champion Singapore, a team highly regarded for its disciplined style of play and a squad of naturalized players. In the first leg at My Dinh National Stadium, the two teams drew 0–0 in a closely contested match. The second leg at Kallang Stadium saw the resilience of the Vietnamese defense against the relentless pressure from the home team. In the 74th minute, following a sharp counter-attack, Le Cong Vinh sprinted down the left wing before delivering a perfect cross for Nguyen Quang Hai to score the only goal of the match. Winning 1–0 on aggregate after two legs, Vietnam reached the final for the first time in 10 years.

Vietnam and Thailand faced each other again in a historic final. In the first leg at Rajamangala Stadium, Vietnam caused a sensation by defeating the "War Elephants" 2-1 thanks to goals from Nguyen Vu Phong and Le Cong Vinh in the first half. This was Vietnam's first victory against Thailand on their home ground in an official tournament.

The second leg match, played on the evening of December 28, 2008, at My Dinh Stadium, became one of the most memorable moments in Vietnamese football history. Thailand took the lead thanks to a goal by Teerasil Dangda in the 21st minute, bringing the aggregate score back to a tie. As the match entered its final seconds of injury time and spectators were thinking about extra time, from a free kick taken by Nguyen Minh Phuong, Le Cong Vinh executed a spectacular backward header that beat goalkeeper Kosin Hathairattanakool. This goal secured a 1-1 draw in the second leg and a 3-2 aggregate victory, giving Vietnam its first-ever Southeast Asian championship title and creating a nationwide sensation and celebrations.

==== Roster ====
Head Coach: (Portugal) Henrique Calisto

No.	Pos.	Player	Date of birth (age)	Caps	Club
1	GK	Dương Hồng Sơn	20 November 1982 (aged 26)		(Vietnam) Hà Nội T&T
2	DF	Đoàn Việt Cường	1 January 1985 (aged 23)		(Vietnam) TĐCS Đồng Tháp
3	DF	Nguyễn Minh Đức	14 September 1983 (aged 25)		(Vietnam) Sông Lam Nghệ An
4	DF	Lê Phước Tứ	15 April 1984 (aged 24)		(Vietnam) Thể Công
5	MF	Nguyễn Minh Châu	9 January 1985 (aged 23)		(Vietnam) Xi Măng Hải Phòng
6	DF	Phan Thanh Giang	3 October 1981 (aged 27)		(Vietnam) Đồng Tâm Long An
7	DF	Vũ Như Thành	28 August 1981 (aged 27)		(Vietnam) Becamex Bình Dương
8	FW	Thạch Bảo Khanh	25 April 1979 (aged 29)		(Vietnam) Thể Công
9	FW	Lê Công Vinh	10 December 1985 (aged 22)		(Vietnam) Sông Lam Nghệ An
10	MF	Trần Trường Giang	1 November 1976 (aged 32)		(Vietnam) Becamex Bình Dương
11	DF	Lê Quang Cường	2 January 1983 (aged 25)		(Vietnam) SHB Đà Nẵng
12	MF	Nguyễn Minh Phương	5 July 1980 (aged 28)		(Vietnam) Đồng Tâm Long An
13	FW	Nguyễn Quang Hải	1 November 1985 (aged 23)		(Vietnam) Khatoco Khánh Hòa
14	MF	Lê Tấn Tài	4 January 1984 (aged 24)		(Vietnam) Khatoco Khánh Hòa
15	GK	Bùi Quang Huy	24 July 1982 (aged 26)		(Vietnam) Nam Định
16	DF	Huỳnh Quang Thanh	4 June 1984 (aged 24)		(Vietnam) Becamex Bình Dương
17	MF	Nguyễn Vũ Phong	6 February 1985 (aged 23)		(Vietnam) Becamex Bình Dương
18	FW	Phan Thanh Bình	1 November 1986 (aged 22)		(Vietnam) TĐCS Đồng Tháp
19	MF	Phạm Thành Lương	9 October 1988 (aged 20)		(Vietnam) Hà Nội ACB
20	GK	Trần Đức Cường	20 May 1985 (aged 23)		(Vietnam) SHB Đà Nẵng
21	FW	Nguyễn Việt Thắng	13 September 1981 (aged 27)		(Vietnam) Đồng Tâm Long An
22	MF	Phan Văn Tài Em (c)	23 April 1982 (aged 26)		(Vietnam) Đồng Tâm Long An

==== Group stage ====
Pos	Team	Pld	W	D	L	GF	GA	GD	Pts	Qualification
1	Thailand	3	3	0	0	11	0	+11	9	Advance to knockout stage
2	Vietnam	3	2	0	1	7	4	+3	6	Advance to knockout stage
3	Malaysia	3	1	0	2	5	6	−1	3	
4	Laos	3	0	0	3	0	13	−13	0	

Source: RSSSF
6 December 2008
19:30 UTC+7
Matchday 1

Thailand	2–0	Vietnam
Sutee Suksomkit 34'; Suchao Nuchnum 45+4'

Surakul Stadium, Phuket
Attendance: 20,000
Referee: Abdul Malik Abdul Bashir (Singapore)

8 December 2008
17:00 UTC+7
Matchday 2

Malaysia	2–3	Vietnam
Indra Putra Mahayuddin 20', 85'		Phạm Thành Lương 16'; Nguyễn Vũ Phong 72', 86'

Surakul Stadium, Phuket
Referee: Pandian Palaniyandi (Singapore)

10 December 2008
19:30 UTC+7
Matchday 3

Vietnam	4–0	Laos
Nguyễn Việt Thắng 48'; Phạm Thành Lương 63'; Huỳnh Quang Thanh 66'; Phan Thanh Bình 80'

Surakul Stadium, Phuket
Referee: Win Cho (Myanmar)

==== Knockout stage ====
Semi-finals

Team 1	Agg.	Team 2	1st leg	2nd leg
Vietnam	1–0	Singapore	0–0	1–0

17 December 2008
19:00 UTC+7
First leg

Vietnam	0–0	Singapore
	Recap

Mỹ Đình National Stadium, Hanoi
Attendance: 40,000
Referee: Ramachandran Krishnan (Malaysia)

21 December 2008
20:00 UTC+8
Second leg

Singapore	0–1	Vietnam
	Recap	Nguyễn Quang Hải 74'

National Stadium, Singapore
Attendance: 55,000
Referee: Subkhiddin Mohd Salleh (Malaysia)

Final

Team 1	Agg.	Team 2	1st leg	2nd leg
Thailand	2–3	Vietnam	1–2	1–1

24 December 2008
19:30 UTC+7

Thailand	1–2	Vietnam
Dương Hồng Sơn 75' (o.g.)	Recap	Nguyễn Vũ Phong 40'; Lê Công Vinh 42'

Rajamangala Stadium, Bangkok
Attendance: 50,000
Referee: Ramachandran Krishnan (Malaysia)

28 December 2008
19:30 UTC+7

Vietnam	1–1	Thailand
Lê Công Vinh 90+4'	Recap	Teerasil Dangda 21'

Mỹ Đình National Stadium, Hanoi
Attendance: 40,000
Referee: Abdul Malik Abdul Bashir (Singapore)

=== 2018 AFF Championship ===
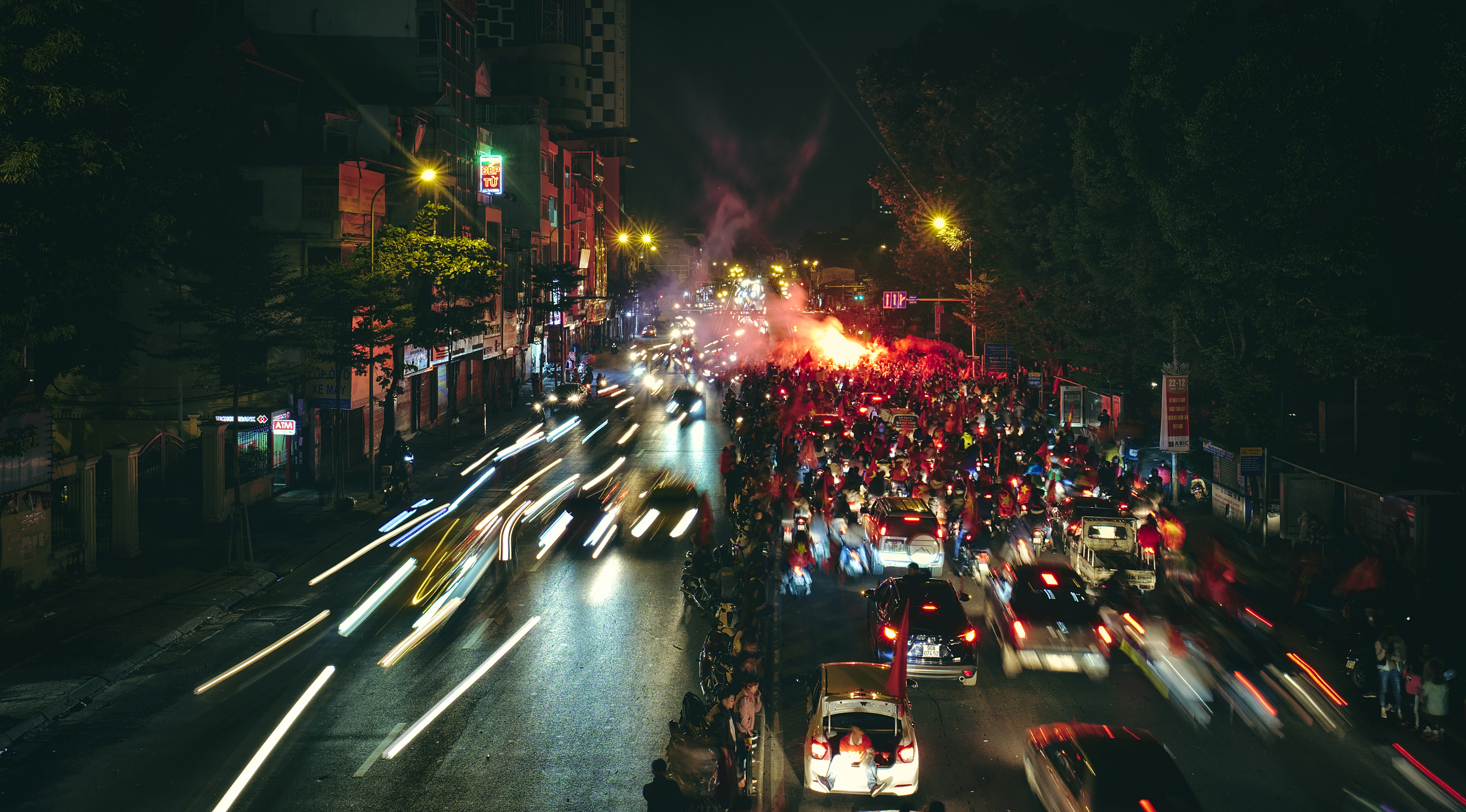
A "street storming" of people in Hanoi capital after the second leg match at December 15, 2018.

Vietnam was placed in Group A along with Malaysia, Myanmar, Cambodia, and Laos. The team started well with a 3–0 victory over Laos away from home, followed by a 2–0 win against direct rival Malaysia at My Dinh Stadium. After a disappointing goalless draw against Myanmar, Vietnam finished the group stage with a dominant 3–0 victory over Cambodia. At the end of this phase, Vietnam topped Group A with 10 points, scoring 8 goals and, remarkably, conceding none, setting a record for defensive performance in the group stage.

Vietnam's opponent in the semi-finals was the Philippines, led by manager Sven-Göran Eriksson. In the first leg in Bacolod, Vietnam gained a significant advantage with a 2–1 victory thanks to goals from Anh Duc and Phan Van Duc. Returning to their home ground, My Dinh Stadium, for the second leg, the team maintained their dominance and secured a 2–1 victory in the final minutes thanks to goals from Quang Hai and Cong Phuong. Winning 4–2 on aggregate after two legs, Vietnam officially advanced to the final, their first in 10 years since 2008.

In the final, Vietnam faced Malaysia again. The first leg at Bukit Jalil Stadium was dramatic; Vietnam took an early two-goal lead thanks to goals from Huy Hung and Duc Huy, but allowed their opponents to equalize 2–2 in the second half. The decisive second leg took place on December 15, 2018, at Mỹ Đình National Stadium. In the 6th minute, Nguyen Anh Duc scored the only goal after a pass from Quang Hai, giving Vietnam a 1–0 victory (3–2 on aggregate) and securing their second championship title after a 10-year wait.

==== Roster ====
Head coach: (South Korea) Park Hang-seo

The final roster was announced on 3 November 2018.

No.	Pos.	Player	Date of birth (age)	Club
1	GK	Bùi Tiến Dũng	28 February 1997 (aged 21)	(Vietnam Football Federation) FLC Thanh Hóa
3	DF	Quế Ngọc Hải (vice captain)	15 May 1993 (aged 25)	(Vietnam Football Federation) Sông Lam Nghệ An
4	DF	Bùi Tiến Dũng	2 October 1995 (aged 23)	(Vietnam Football Federation) Viettel
5	DF	Đoàn Văn Hậu	19 April 1999 (aged 19)	(Vietnam Football Federation) Hà Nội
6	MF	Lương Xuân Trường	28 April 1995 (aged 23)	(Vietnam Football Federation) Hoàng Anh Gia Lai
8	MF	Nguyễn Trọng Hoàng	14 April 1989 (aged 29)	(Vietnam Football Federation) FLC Thanh Hóa
9	FW	Nguyễn Văn Toàn	12 April 1996 (aged 22)	(Vietnam Football Federation) Hoàng Anh Gia Lai
10	FW	Nguyễn Văn Quyết (captain)	27 June 1991 (aged 27)	(Vietnam Football Federation) Hà Nội
11	FW	Nguyễn Anh Đức	24 October 1985 (aged 33)	(Vietnam Football Federation) Becamex Bình Dương
12	DF	Nguyễn Phong Hồng Duy	13 June 1996 (aged 22)	(Vietnam Football Federation) Hoàng Anh Gia Lai
13	FW	Hà Đức Chinh	22 September 1997 (aged 21)	(Vietnam Football Federation) SHB Đà Nẵng
14	FW	Nguyễn Công Phượng	21 January 1995 (aged 23)	(Vietnam Football Federation) Hoàng Anh Gia Lai
15	MF	Phạm Đức Huy	20 January 1995 (aged 23)	(Vietnam Football Federation) Hà Nội
16	MF	Đỗ Hùng Dũng	8 September 1993 (aged 25)	(Vietnam Football Federation) Hà Nội
17	DF	Lục Xuân Hưng	15 April 1995 (aged 23)	(Vietnam Football Federation) FLC Thanh Hóa
19	MF	Nguyễn Quang Hải	12 April 1997 (aged 21)	(Vietnam Football Federation) Hà Nội
20	FW	Phan Văn Đức	11 April 1996 (aged 22)	(Vietnam Football Federation) Sông Lam Nghệ An
21	DF	Trần Đình Trọng	25 April 1997 (aged 21)	(Vietnam Football Federation) Hà Nội
22	FW	Nguyễn Tiến Linh	20 October 1997 (aged 21)	(Vietnam Football Federation) Becamex Bình Dương
23	GK	Đặng Văn Lâm	13 August 1993 (aged 25)	(Vietnam Football Federation) Hải Phòng
26	GK	Nguyễn Tuấn Mạnh	31 July 1990 (aged 28)	(Vietnam Football Federation) Sanna Khánh Hòa BVN
28	DF	Đỗ Duy Mạnh	29 September 1996 (aged 22)	(Vietnam Football Federation) Hà Nội
29	MF	Nguyễn Huy Hùng	2 March 1992 (aged 26)	(Vietnam Football Federation) Quảng Nam

==== Group stage ====
Pos	Team	Pld	W	D	L	GF	GA	GD	Pts	Qualification
1	Vietnam	4	3	1	0	8	0	+8	10	Advance to knockout phase
2	Malaysia	4	3	0	1	7	3	+4	9	Advance to knockout phase
3	Myanmar	4	2	1	1	7	5	+2	7	
4	Cambodia	4	1	0	3	4	9	−5	3	
5	Laos	4	0	0	4	3	12	−9	0	

Source: AFF
8 November 2018
19:30 UTC+7
Matchday 1

Laos	0–3	Vietnam
	Report (AFFSZ); Report (AFF)	Nguyễn Công Phượng 11'; Nguyễn Anh Đức 45+2'; Nguyễn Quang Hải 68'

New Laos National Stadium, Vientiane
Attendance: 15,000
Referee: Thoriq Munir Alkatiri (Indonesia)

Laos	Vietnam

16 November 2018
19:30 UTC+7
Matchday 3

Vietnam	2–0	Malaysia
Nguyễn Công Phượng 11'; Nguyễn Anh Đức 60'	Report (AFFSZ); Report (AFF)

Mỹ Đình National Stadium, Hanoi
Attendance: 40,000
Referee: Turki Al-Khudayr (Saudi Arabia)

Vietnam	Malaysia

20 November 2018
18:00 UTC+6:30
Matchday 4

Myanmar	0–0	Vietnam
	Report (AFFSZ); Report (AFF)

Mandalarthiri Stadium, Mandalay
Attendance: 29,954
Referee: Khamis Al-Marri (Qatar)

Myanmar	Vietnam

24 November 2018
19:30 UTC+7
Matchday 5

Vietnam	3–0	Cambodia
Nguyễn Tiến Linh 39'; Nguyễn Quang Hải 41'; Phan Văn Đức 61'	Report (AFFSZ); Report (AFF)

Hàng Đẫy Stadium, Hanoi
Attendance: 14,000
Referee: Ma Ning (China)

Vietnam	Cambodia

==== Knockout stage ====
Semi-finals

Team 1	Agg.	Team 2	1st leg	2nd leg
Philippines	2–4	Vietnam	1–2	1–2

2 December 2018
19:30 UTC+8
First leg

Philippines	1–2	Vietnam
Patrick Reichelt 45+2'	Report (AFFSZ); Report (AFF)	Nguyễn Anh Đức 12'; Phan Văn Đức 48'

Panaad Stadium, Bacolod
Attendance: 5,489
Referee: Abdulrahman Al-Jassim (Qatar)

Philippines	Vietnam

6 December 2018
19:30 UTC+7
Second leg

Vietnam	2–1	Philippines
Nguyễn Quang Hải 84'; Nguyễn Công Phượng 87'	Report (AFFSZ); Report (AFF)	James Younghusband 89'

Mỹ Đình National Stadium, Hanoi
Attendance: 38,816
Referee: Hiroyuki Kimura (Japan)

Vietnam	Philippines

Final

Team 1	Agg.	Team 2	1st leg	2nd leg
Malaysia	2–3	Vietnam	2–2	0–1

11 December 2018
20:45 UTC+8
First leg

Malaysia	2–2	Vietnam
Shahrul Saad 36'; Safawi Rasid 61'	Report (AFFSZ); Report (AFF)	Nguyễn Huy Hùng 22'; Phạm Đức Huy 25'

Bukit Jalil National Stadium, Kuala Lumpur
Attendance: 88,482
Referee: Chris Beath (Australia)

Malaysia	Vietnam

15 December 2018
19:30 UTC+7
Second leg

Vietnam	1–0	Malaysia
Nguyễn Anh Đức 6'	Report (AFFSZ); Report (AFF)

Mỹ Đình National Stadium, Hanoi
Attendance: 40,000
Referee: Alireza Faghani (Iran)

Vietnam	Malaysia

=== 2024 ASEAN Championship ===
Vietnam were seeded in Group B alongside Indonesia, the Philippines, Myanmar, and Laos. The team had endured heavy criticism before the competition as a result of the previous failures during the 2023 AFC Asian Cup and the 2026 FIFA World Cup qualification. However, they started off strong with a 4–1 away victory over Laos. This was followed by a narrow 1–0 victory against Indonesia at Việt Trì Stadium. After managing to avoid a defeat against the Philippines with a last-minute equalizer from Doãn Ngọc Tân to end the away match at 1–1, Vietnam achieved a dominant 5–0 home win against Myanmar, a match marked with the debut of naturalized player Rafaelson, who scored twice and provided two assists. With three victories and one draw, the team finished top of Group B.

Vietnam encountered Singapore in the semi-finals. Following a goalless first half, Vietnam scored twice with a last-minute penalty from Nguyễn Tiến Linh followed by the second goal from Rafaelson three minutes later to end the first leg, an away fixture, with a 2–0 win for Vietnam. In the return leg at home on 29 December, both players scored again, with Rafaelson scoring a brace to secure a comfortable 3–1 victory for the Golden Star Warriors. With a 5–1 aggregate victory, Vietnam had advanced to the final, marking the first time that Vietnam had qualified for two successive ASEAN Championship finals.

The final was contested between Vietnam and defending champions Thailand, marking the second time in a row that both teams had met in an ASEAN Championship final. Vietnam hosted the first leg of the final on 2 January 2025 at Việt Trì Stadium. In the second half, Rafaelson scored twice, while Thailand had also scored a consolation goal to end the home fixture in a narrow 2–1 victory, Vietnam's first home victory over Thailand since 1998. Three days later, Vietnam traveled to Rajamangala Stadium for the second leg. Phạm Tuấn Hải scored the opening goal for the team eight minutes into the match. However, Thailand regained the initiative after an Ben Davis equalizer, followed by Rafaelson's heavy injury a few minutes later which made him absent from the national team until November 2025. In the second half, Vietnam conceded a controversial long-range goal from Supachok Sarachat. The match turned tides again shortly after, as Weerathep Pomphan was sent off, giving the visitors a numerical advantage. The team utilized this opportunity and equalized with an own goal by Pansa Hemviboon. At injury time, a quick counter-attack from Vietnam culminated in Nguyễn Hai Long shooting the ball into the empty net and scoring the winner, as they emerged victorious with an 3–2 victory and triumphed 5–3 on aggregate, earning their third ASEAN Championship title after six years of await.

==== Roster ====
Vietnam announced their 30-man preliminary list on 18 November 2024 for a training camp in South Korea to prepare for the tournament. On 3 December, Nguyễn Văn Vĩ, Nguyễn Văn Toàn and Nguyễn Xuân Son were added to the squad, extending the list to 33 players. The final squad was announced on 5 December.

Head coach: (South Korea) Kim Sang-sik

No.	Pos.	Player	Date of birth (age)	Caps	Goals	Club
1	GK	Nguyễn Filip	14 September 1992 (aged 32)	9	0	(Vietnam Football Federation) Cong An Hanoi
2	DF	Đỗ Duy Mạnh (captain)	29 September 1996 (aged 28)	58	1	(Vietnam Football Federation) Hanoi FC
3	DF	Nguyễn Văn Vĩ	12 February 1998 (age 28)	1	0	(Vietnam Football Federation) Thep Xanh Nam Dinh
4	DF	Bùi Tiến Dũng	2 October 1995 (aged 29)	50	1	(Vietnam Football Federation) The Cong-Viettel
5	DF	Trương Tiến Anh	25 April 1999 (aged 25)	8	1	(Vietnam Football Federation) The Cong-Viettel
6	DF	Nguyễn Thanh Bình	2 November 2000 (aged 24)	24	1	(Vietnam Football Federation) The Cong-Viettel
7	DF	Phạm Xuân Mạnh	27 March 1996 (aged 28)	14	0	(Vietnam Football Federation) Hanoi FC
8	MF	Châu Ngọc Quang	1 February 1996 (aged 28)	6	1	(Vietnam Football Federation) Hoang Anh Gia Lai
9	FW	Nguyễn Văn Toàn	12 April 1996 (age 30)	64	7	(Vietnam Football Federation) Thep Xanh Nam Dinh
10	FW	Phạm Tuấn Hải	19 May 1998 (aged 26)	31	7	(Vietnam Football Federation) Hanoi FC
11	MF	Lê Phạm Thành Long	5 June 1996 (aged 28)	7	0	(Vietnam Football Federation) Cong An Hanoi
12	FW	Nguyễn Xuân Son	30 March 1997 (age 29)	0	0	(Vietnam Football Federation) Thep Xanh Nam Dinh
13	DF	Hồ Tấn Tài	6 November 1997 (aged 27)	26	4	(Vietnam Football Federation) Becamex Binh Duong
14	MF	Nguyễn Hoàng Đức	11 January 1998 (aged 26)	39	2	(Vietnam Football Federation) Phu Dong Ninh Binh
15	FW	Bùi Vĩ Hào	24 February 2003 (aged 21)	5	1	(Vietnam Football Federation) Becamex Binh Duong
16	DF	Nguyễn Thành Chung	8 September 1997 (aged 27)	24	0	(Vietnam Football Federation) Hanoi FC
17	DF	Vũ Văn Thanh	14 April 1996 (aged 28)	52	5	(Vietnam Football Federation) Cong An Hanoi
18	FW	Đinh Thanh Bình	19 March 1998 (aged 26)	6	0	(Vietnam Football Federation) Phu Dong Ninh Binh
19	MF	Nguyễn Quang Hải	12 April 1997 (aged 27)	65	11	(Vietnam Football Federation) Cong An Hanoi
20	DF	Bùi Hoàng Việt Anh	1 January 1999 (aged 25)	22	1	(Vietnam Football Federation) Cong An Hanoi
21	GK	Nguyễn Đình Triệu	4 November 1991 (aged 33)	2	0	(Vietnam Football Federation) Haiphong
22	FW	Nguyễn Tiến Linh	20 October 1997 (aged 27)	50	21	(Vietnam Football Federation) Becamex Binh Duong
23	GK	Trần Trung Kiên	9 February 2003 (aged 21)	0	0	(Vietnam Football Federation) Hoang Anh Gia Lai
24	MF	Nguyễn Hai Long	27 August 2000 (aged 24)	3	0	(Vietnam Football Federation) Hanoi FC
25	MF	Doãn Ngọc Tân	15 August 1994 (aged 30)	0	0	(Vietnam Football Federation) Dong A Thanh Hoa
26	MF	Khuất Văn Khang	11 May 2003 (aged 21)	16	1	(Vietnam Football Federation) The Cong-Viettel

==== Group stage ====
Pos	Team	Pld	W	D	L	GF	GA	GD	Pts	Qualification
1	Vietnam	4	3	1	0	11	2	+9	10	Advance to knockout stage
2	Philippines	4	1	3	0	4	3	+1	6	Advance to knockout stage
3	Indonesia	4	1	1	2	4	5	−1	4	
4	Myanmar	4	1	1	2	4	9	−5	4	
5	Laos	4	0	2	2	7	11	−4	2	

Source: ASEAN United FC
9 December 2024
20:00 UTC+7

Laos	1–4	Vietnam
Bounphachan 90+5' (pen.)	Report	Nguyễn Hai Long 58'; Nguyễn Tiến Linh 63'; Nguyễn Văn Toàn 69'; Nguyễn Văn Vĩ 82'

New Laos National Stadium, Vientiane
Attendance: 10,685
Referee: Ko Hyung-jin (South Korea)

Laos	Vietnam

15 December 2024
20:00 UTC+7

Vietnam	1–0	Indonesia
Nguyễn Quang Hải 77'	Report

Việt Trì Stadium, Việt Trì
Attendance: 16,669
Referee: Abdullah Dhafer Al-Shehri (Saudi Arabia)

Vietnam	Indonesia

18 December 2024
21:00 UTC+8

Philippines	1–1	Vietnam
Gayoso 68'	Report	Doãn Ngọc Tân 90+7'

Rizal Memorial Stadium, Manila
Attendance: 3,346
Referee: Akobirxuja Shukurullaev (Uzbekistan)

Philippines	Vietnam

21 December 2024
20:00 UTC+7

Vietnam	5–0	Myanmar
Bùi Vĩ Hào 48'; Nguyễn Xuân Son 55', 90'; Nguyễn Quang Hải 74'; Nguyễn Tiến Linh 90+2'	Report

Việt Trì Stadium, Việt Trì
Attendance: 16,869
Referee: Koki Nagamine (Japan)

Vietnam	Myanmar

==== Knockout stage ====
Semi-final

Team 1	Agg.	Team 2	1st leg	2nd leg
Singapore	1–5	Vietnam	0–2	1–3

26 December 2024
21:00 UTC+8
First leg

Singapore	0–2	Vietnam
	Report	Nguyễn Tiến Linh 90+11' (pen.); Nguyễn Xuân Son 90+14'

Jalan Besar Stadium, Singapore
Attendance: 5,233
Referee: Kim Woo-sung (South Korea)

Singapore	Vietnam

29 December 2024
20:00 UTC+7
Second leg

Vietnam	3–1	Singapore
Nguyễn Xuân Son 45+1' (pen.), 63'; Nguyễn Tiến Linh 90+3' (pen.)	Report	Nakamura 74'

Việt Trì Stadium, Việt Trì
Attendance: 15,583
Referee: Rustam Lutfullin (Uzbekistan)

Vietnam	Singapore

Final

Team 1	Agg.	Team 2	1st leg	2nd leg
Vietnam	5–3	Thailand	2–1	3–2

2 January 2025
20:00 UTC+7
First leg

Vietnam	2–1	Thailand
Nguyễn Xuân Son 59', 73'	Report	Chalermsak 83'

Việt Trì Stadium, Việt Trì
Attendance: 15,604
Referee: Salman Ahmad Falahi (Qatar)

Vietnam	Thailand

5 January 2025
20:00 UTC+7
Second leg

Thailand	2–3	Vietnam
Davis 28'; Supachok 64'	Report	Phạm Tuấn Hải 8'; Pansa 82' (o.g.); Nguyễn Hai Long 90+20'

Rajamangala Stadium, Bangkok
Attendance: 46,982
Referee: Ko Hyung-jin (South Korea)

Thailand	Vietnam
