= 2010 Millennial Anniversary of Hanoi Football Championship =

International football tournament

Eximbank Cup

Tournament details
- Host country: Vietnam
- Cities: Hanoi & Ho Chi Minh City
- Dates: 20–24 September 2010 (Hanoi tournament); 28 September–2 October 2010 (Ho Chi Minh City tournament)
- Teams: 8 (from 1 confederation)

Tournament statistics
- Matches played: 12
- Goals scored: 16 (1.33 per match)

The 2010 Millennial Anniversary of Hanoi Football Championship was an international football tournament hosted by the Vietnam Football Federation to celebrate 1000 years of Hanoi's establishment. The first phase of the tournament was held at Mỹ Đình National Stadium in Hanoi from 20 to 24 September 2010, with the participation of teams from Vietnam, North Korea, Australia U-23, and Kuwait U-23. The second phase took place at Thống Nhất Stadium in Ho Chi Minh City from 28 September to 2 October 2010, featuring the under-23 teams of Vietnam, Iran, Singapore, and Malaysia.

== Venues ==
Hanoi	Ho Chi Minh City
Mỹ Đình National Stadium	Thống Nhất Stadium
Capacity: 40,000	Capacity: 16,000

== Hanoi tournament ==
=== Standings ===
Pos	Team	Pld	W	D	L	GF	GA	GD	Pts	
1	North Korea	3	2	1	0	2	0	+2	7	Champions
2	Vietnam (H)	3	1	1	1	3	2	+1	4	Runners-up
3	Australia U-23	3	1	1	1	2	1	+1	4	Third place
4	Kuwait U-23	3	0	1	2	0	4	−4	1	

(H) Hosts

=== Results ===
20 September 2010
16:45

North Korea	1 – 0	Australia U-23
Pak Song-chol 17'	Report

Mỹ Đình National Stadium, Hanoi
Attendance: 100
Referee: Phùng Đình Dũng (Vietnam)
20 September 2010
19:00

Vietnam	3 – 0	Kuwait U-23
Việt Thắng 45' (pen.); Minh Phương 66'; Trọng Hoàng 84'	Report

Mỹ Đình National Stadium, Hanoi
Attendance: 40,000

22 September 2010
17:00

Kuwait U-23	0 – 1	North Korea
	Report	An Chol-Hyok 70'

Mỹ Đình National Stadium, Hanoi
Attendance: 200
22 September 2010
19:00

Australia U-23	2 – 0	Vietnam
James Rooney 19'; Jason Michael 36'	Report

Mỹ Đình National Stadium, Hanoi
Attendance: 20,000

24 September 2010
17:00

Kuwait U-23	0 – 0	Australia U-23
	Report

Mỹ Đình National Stadium, Hanoi
Attendance: 200
24 September 2010
19:00

Vietnam	0 – 0	North Korea
	Report

Mỹ Đình National Stadium, Hanoi
Attendance: 40,000

== Ho Chi Minh City tournament ==
=== Standings ===
Pos	Team	Pld	W	D	L	GF	GA	GD	Pts	
1	Vietnam U-23 (H)	3	2	1	0	4	1	+3	7	Champions
2	Iran U-23	3	1	1	1	3	3	0	4	Runners-up
3	Singapore U-23	3	0	3	0	1	1	0	3	Third place
4	Malaysia U-23	3	0	1	2	1	4	−3	1	

(H) Hosts

=== Results ===
28 September 2010
16:00

Iran U-23	1 – 1	Singapore U-23
Aliasgari 27'	Report	Luo Zhenlun 73'

Thống Nhất Stadium, Ho Chi Minh City
28 September 2010
18:30

Vietnam U-23	2 – 1	Malaysia U-23
Anh Đức 19', 26'	Report	Norshahrul 44'

Thống Nhất Stadium, Ho Chi Minh City
Attendance: 10,000

30 September 2010
16:00

Malaysia U-23	0 – 2	Iran U-23
	Report	Mousavi 42'; Afshin 76'

Thống Nhất Stadium, Ho Chi Minh City
30 September 2010
18:30

Singapore U-23	0 – 0	Vietnam U-23
	Report

Thống Nhất Stadium, Ho Chi Minh City
Attendance: 20,000

2 October 2010
16:00

Singapore U-23	0 – 0	Malaysia U-23
	Report

Thống Nhất Stadium, Ho Chi Minh City
2 October 2010
18:30

Vietnam U-23	2 – 0	Iran U-23
Anh Đức 45+1'; Đình Tùng 76'	Report

Thống Nhất Stadium, Ho Chi Minh City

== Squads ==
=== Vietnam ===
Coach: (Portugal) Henrique Calisto

No.	Pos.	Player	Date of birth (age)	Caps	Club
1	GK	Dương Hồng Sơn	November 20, 1982 (aged 27)	28	(Vietnam) Hà Nội T&T
2	DF	Lê Văn Trương	February 20, 1982 (aged 28)	0	(Vietnam) Hoàng Anh Gia Lai
3	DF	Nguyễn Huy Hoàng	January 4, 1981 (aged 29)	20	(Vietnam) Sông Lam Nghệ An
4	DF	Lê Phước Tứ	April 15, 1984 (aged 26)	18	(Vietnam) Lam Sơn Thanh Hóa
5	MF	Nguyễn Minh Châu	January 9, 1985 (aged 25)	15	(Vietnam) Xi Măng Hải Phòng
6	DF	Đoàn Việt Cường	January 1, 1985 (aged 25)	19	(Vietnam) Hoàng Anh Gia Lai
7	DF	Vũ Như Thành	August 28, 1981 (aged 29)	35	(Vietnam) The Vissai Ninh Bình
8	FW	Nguyễn Việt Thắng	September 13, 1981 (aged 29)	25	(Vietnam) The Vissai Ninh Bình
10	FW	Phạm Văn Quyến	April 29, 1984 (aged 26)	14	(Vietnam) Sông Lam Nghệ An
11	MF	Nguyễn Trọng Hoàng	April 14, 1989 (aged 21)	5	(Vietnam) Sông Lam Nghệ An
12	MF	Nguyễn Minh Phương (Captain)	July 5, 1980 (aged 30)	44	(Vietnam) Đồng Tâm Long An
13	MF	Nguyễn Xuân Thành	March 22, 1985 (aged 25)	0	(Vietnam) Hà Nội ACB
14	MF	Lê Tấn Tài	January 4, 1984 (aged 26)	34	(Vietnam) Khatoco Khánh Hòa
15	DF	Đào Văn Phong	June 6, 1985 (aged 25)	3	(Vietnam) Khatoco Khánh Hòa
16	DF	Huỳnh Quang Thanh	October 10, 1984 (aged 25)	19	(Vietnam) Becamex Bình Dương
17	MF	Nguyễn Vũ Phong	February 6, 1985 (aged 25)	32	(Vietnam) Becamex Bình Dương
18	MF	Cao Sỹ Cường	April 26, 1984 (aged 26)	0	(Vietnam) Hà Nội T&T
19	MF	Phạm Thành Lương	September 10, 1988 (aged 22)	18	(Vietnam) Hà Nội ACB
20	DF	Trương Đình Luật	November 12, 1983 (aged 26)	4	(Vietnam) Navibank Sài Gòn
21	FW	Lê Sỹ Mạnh	June 25, 1984 (aged 26)	3	(Vietnam) Quảng Nam
23	MF	Trần Đức Dương	May 2, 1983 (aged 27)	2	(Vietnam) Xi Măng Hải Phòng
25	GK	Nguyễn Mạnh Dũng	April 29, 1981 (aged 29)	0	(Vietnam) Thanh Hóa
	DF	Trần Chí Công	April 20, 1984 (aged 26)	5	(Vietnam) Becamex Bình Dương
37	MF	Trần Duy Quang	August 22, 1978 (aged 32)	5	(Vietnam) Hoàng Anh Gia Lai
13	FW	Nguyễn Quang Hải	November 1, 1985 (aged 24)	18	(Vietnam) Khatoco Khánh Hòa

=== North Korea ===
Coach: Jo Tong-Sop

No.	Pos.	Player	Date of birth (age)	Caps	Club
	MF	Mun In-Guk	September 29, 1978 (aged 31)	46	(North Korea) April 25
	DF	Ri Kwang-Chon	September 4, 1985 (aged 25)	30	(North Korea) April 25
	FW	Kim Kum-Il	October 10, 1987 (aged 22)	9	(North Korea) April 25
	FW	Choe Kum-Chol	February 9, 1987 (aged 23)	13	(North Korea) Rimyongsu
	DF	Nam Song-Chol	May 7, 1982 (aged 28)	41	(North Korea) April 25
	DF	Pak Yong-Jin	January 29, 1989 (aged 21)	4	(North Korea) Rimyongsu
	FW	An Chol-Hyok	June 27, 1987 (aged 23)	16	(North Korea) Rimyongsu
	MF	Pak Song-Chol	September 24, 1987 (aged 22)	5	(North Korea) Rimyongsu
	MF	Kim Kyong-Il	December 11, 1988 (aged 21)	4	(North Korea) Rimyongsu
	FW	Pak Chol-Min	December 10, 1988 (aged 21)	7	(North Korea) Rimyongsu
	GK	Kim Myong-Gil	October 6, 1984 (aged 25)	7	(North Korea) Amrokgang
	DF	Pak Chol-Jin	September 5, 1985 (aged 25)	24	(North Korea) Amrokgang
	DF	Pak Nam-Chol	October 3, 1988 (aged 21)	10	(North Korea) Amrokgang
	DF	Jon Kwang-Ik	April 5, 1988 (aged 22)	3	(North Korea) Amrokgang
	DF	Ri Kwang-Hyok	April 17, 1987 (aged 23)	12	(North Korea) Kyonggongop
	MF	Choe Myong-Ho	July 3, 1988 (aged 22)	2	(North Korea) Pyongyang City
	GK	Ju Kwang-Min	May 20, 1990 (aged 20)	1	(North Korea) Kigwancha
	FW	Pak Kwang-Ryong	September 27, 1992 (aged 17)	7	(Switzerland) Basel
	MF	Yun Yong-Il	July 31, 1988 (aged 22)	10	(North Korea) Wolmido
	MF	Ri Chol-Myong	February 18, 1988 (aged 22)	11	(North Korea) Pyongyang City
	MF	Kim Yong-Jun	July 19, 1983 (aged 27)	48	(North Korea) Pyongyang City
	GK	Ri Myong-Guk	September 9, 1986 (aged 24)	30	(North Korea) Pyongyang City

=== Australia U-23 ===
Coach: Aurelio Vidmar

No.	Pos.	Player	Date of birth (age)	Caps	Club
	GK	Andrew Redmayne	13 January 1989 (aged 21)	2	(Australia) Brisbane Roar
	GK	Jerrad Tyson	21 September 1989 (aged 20)	1	(Australia) Gold Coast United
	DF	Sebastian Ryall	18 July 1989 (aged 21)	3	(Australia) Sydney FC
	DF	Luke De Vere	5 November 1989 (aged 20)	2	(Australia) Brisbane Roar
	DF	Matthew Jurman	9 December 1989 (aged 20)	1	(Australia) Sydney
	DF	Antony Golec	29 May 1990 (aged 20)	2	(Australia) Sydney
	DF	Scott Neville	11 January 1989 (aged 21)	3	(Australia) Perth Glory
	DF	Daniel Mullen	26 October 1989 (aged 20)	2	(Australia) Adelaide United
	DF	Diogo Ferreira	5 October 1989 (aged 20)	3	(Australia) Melbourne Victory
	MF	Luke Brattan	8 March 1990 (aged 20)	0	(Australia) Brisbane Roar
	MF	Mitch Nichols	9 April 1989 (aged 21)	2	(Australia) Brisbane Roar
	MF	Isaka Cernak	3 July 1989 (aged 21)	3	(Australia) North Queensland Fury
	MF	James Brown	19 February 1990 (aged 20)	3	(Australia) Gold Coast United
	MF	Oliver Bozanic	8 January 1989 (aged 21)	3	(Australia) Central Coast Mariners
	MF	Tahj Minniecon	13 February 1989 (aged 21)	3	(Australia) Gold Coast United
	FW	Jason Hoffman	28 January 1989 (aged 21)	8	(Australia) Melbourne Heart
	FW	Mate Dugandzic	22 October 1989 (aged 20)	2	(Australia) Melbourne Victory
	FW	Marko Jesic	7 August 1989 (aged 21)	3	(Australia) Newcastle Jets
	FW	Mirjan Pavlovic	21 April 1989 (aged 21)	3	(Australia) Wellington Phoenix
	FW	Chris Payne	15 September 1990 (aged 20)	3	(Australia) North Queensland Fury
