= Kittisak Rawangpa =

Thai footballer (born 1975)

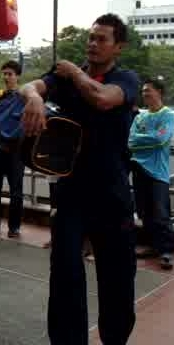

Personal information
- Full name: Kittisak Rawangpa
- Date of birth: 3 January 1975 (age 51)
- Place of birth: Rayong, Thailand
- Height: 1.86 m (6 ft 1 in)
- Position: Goalkeeper

Youth career
- 1988–1991: Bankhai School
- 1992–1993: Assumption College
- 1994–1997: Kasetsart University

Senior career*
Years	Team	Apps	(Gls)
1998–2003	Sinthana	115	(0)
2005–2006	Đá Mỹ Nghệ Sài Gòn	36	(0)
2006–2007	Tobacco Monopoly	53	(0)
2008	Customs Department	15	(0)
2008–2009	Osotsapa	48	(0)
2010–2011	Bangkok Glass	23	(0)
2012–2013	J.W. Rangsit	8	(0)
Total		298	(0)

International career
1997–2010	Thailand	45	(0)

Managerial career
- 2013: J.W. Rangsit
Medal record
Thailand national football team
Sea Games
Gold medal – first place	Sea Games 1997	Football
Gold medal – first place	Sea Games 2013	Assistant Coach
ASEAN Football Championship
Winner	Tiger Cup 2000	Player
Winner	Tiger Cup 2002	Player
Runner-up	ASEAN Football Championship 2007	Player
Runner-up	ASEAN Football Championship 2008	Player
Winner	ASEAN Football Championship 2014	Assistant Coach
- * Club domestic league appearances and goals

Kittisak Rawangpa (Thai: กิตติศักดิ์ ระวังป่า, born 3 January 1975) is a Thai former footballer. He also played for the Thailand national football team 1997–2010.

== International career ==
On the back of performing extremely well in the Thailand Premier League, Kittisak was called up to the full national side in coach Peter Reid's first squad announcement. He was called up with 35 other players to the 2008 T&T Cup hosted by Vietnam.

Kittisak was a member of the victorious T&T Cup 2008 winning squad.

He appeared for Thailand in eleven qualifying matches for the 2002 FIFA World Cup.

== Honours ==
=== Player ===
==== International ====
Thailand
- Asian Games Fourth place (1); 2002
- ASEAN Football Championship Champion (2); 2000, 2002

Runners-up 2007, 2008

- Sea Games Gold Medal (1); 1997
- T&T Cup Winner (1); 2008
- Queen's Cup Winner (1); 2010
