= Patiparn Phetphun =

Thai footballer

Personal information
- Full name: Patiparn Phetphun
- Date of birth: 25 September 1980 (age 46)
- Place of birth: Kanchanaburi, Thailand
- Height: 1.82 m (5 ft 11 1/2 in)
- Positions: Center back; defensive midfielder

Youth career
- 2003: Bangkok Bank

Senior career*
Years	Team	Apps	(Gls)
2004–2006	Bangkok Bank	55	(8)
2006–2007	Bangkok United	47	(3)
2008–2009	PEA	57	(6)
2010	Bangkok United	25	(2)
2011–2014	TOT	58	(0)
2015–2016	Police United	30	(2)
2016	Super Power Samut Prakan	6	(0)
2017	BBCU	8	(0)
2017	Ayutthaya	10	(0)
Total		286	(21)

International career^{‡}
2007–2009	Thailand	12	(4)
- * Club domestic league appearances and goals as of 10 December 2008 ‡ National team caps and goals as of 21 December 2008

Patiparn Phetphun (Thai: ปฏิภาณ เพชรพูล; born September 25, 1980), simply known as Tob (Thai: ต็อบ), is a Thai retired professional footballer who played as a center back.

He graduated from Wat Suthiwararam School and Dhurakij Pundit University. He won the domestic championship in 2006 with Bangkok University FC, therefore also gaining valuable experience in the Asian Champions League the following season.

== International career ==
Patiparn was a member of the victorious T&T Cup squad in 2008. He scored the winner in the last minute against North Korea in the opening game of the 3 team round robin group, which proved to be the decisive goal in lifting the cup.

=== International ===
As of 3 April 2016

National team	Year	Apps	Goals
Thailand	2007	4	2
Thailand	2008	7	2
Thailand	2009	1	0
Thailand	Total	12	4

== International goals ==
#	Date	Venue	Opponent	Score	Result	Competition
1.	October 8, 2007	Suphachalasai Stadium, Thailand	Macau	5–1	6-1	2010 FIFA World Cup Qualification
2.	December 26, 2007	Rajamangala Stadium, Thailand	North Korea	1–0	1-0	2007 King's Cup
3.	October 28, 2008	Mỹ Đình National Stadium, Vietnam	North Korea	1–0	1-0	2008 T&T Cup
4.	December 8, 2008	Surakul Stadium, Thailand	Laos	2–0	6-0	2008 AFF Suzuki Cup

== Honours ==
=== Club ===
Bangkok United

- Thai Premier League (1): 2006

PEA

- Thai Premier League (1): 2008

Police United

- Thai Division 1 League (1): 2015
