= Salahudin Awae =

Thai footballer (born 1983)

Personal information
- Full name: Salahudin Awae
- Date of birth: 1 November 1983 (age 42)
- Place of birth: Narathiwat, Thailand
- Height: 1.78 m (5 ft 10 in)
- Positions: Central midfielder; defensive midfielder

Youth career
- 2003: Narathiwat

Senior career*
Years	Team	Apps	(Gls)
2004–2005	Narathiwat	54	(9)
2006–2007	Bangkok Bank	33	(2)
2007–2009	Muangthong United	59	(5)
2010	Buriram PEA	42	(0)
2010–2011	TTM Phichit	37	(2)
2011	PTT Rayong	12	(0)
2012–2013	BBCU	26	(5)
2014	Air Force Central	16	(2)
2014–2015	PTT Rayong	35	(3)
2016–2017	Krabi	15	(1)
Total		329	(29)

International career^{‡}
2008	Thailand	6	(0)
- * Club domestic league appearances and goals as of 14 January 2009 ‡ National team caps and goals as of 5 February 2009

Salahudin Awae (Thai สาลาฮูดิน อาแว;, born November 1, 1983) is a Thai retired footballer. Salahudin won the league championship in 2008.

== Club career ==
In 2010 he was signed from Muang Thong United to Buriram PEA F.C. in the Thai Premier League.

He transferred to PTT Rayong FC in 2011.

== International career ==
On the back of performing extremely well in the Thailand Division 1 League and helping his clubside to the league championship, Salahudin was called up to the full national side in coach Peter Reid's first squad announcement. He was called up with 35 other players to the 2008 T&T Cup hosted by Vietnam.

He made his debut against North Korea on October 28, 2008 in the T&T Cup 2008.

Salahudin was a member of the victorious T&T Cup 2008 winning squad.

== Honours ==
International
Thailand

- ASEAN Football Championship: Runners-up 2008
- T&T Cup: 2008

Clubs

- Thailand Division 1 League: 2008 with Muang Thong United
- Thai Premier League 2009 Champions With Muang Thong United
