= Phan Thanh Bình =

Vietnamese footballer and manager

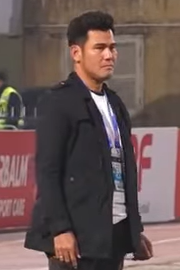
- Phan Thanh Bình as a manager in 2025

Personal information
- Full name: Phan Thanh Bình
- Date of birth: 1 November 1986 (age 39)
- Place of birth: Lai Vung, Đồng Tháp, Vietnam
- Height: 1.74 m (5 ft 9 in)
- Position: Striker

Team information
- Current team: Đồng Tháp (head coach)

Youth career
- 1999–2003: Đồng Tháp

Senior career*
Years	Team	Apps	(Gls)
2003–2008	Đồng Tháp	78	(32)
2009–2010	Hoàng Anh Gia Lai	17	(10)
2010–2013	Đồng Tâm Long An	38	(9)
2014–2015	An Giang	11	(5)
2015–2016	Đắk Lắk	6	(2)
Total		150	(58)

International career
2003–2009	Vietnam U23	25	(10)
2003–2011	Vietnam	31	(13)

Managerial career
- 2016–2017: Mancons Saigon
- 2022–2023: Đồng Tháp
- 2023–2024: Đồng Tháp (assistant)
- 2024–: Đồng Tháp
- * Club domestic league appearances and goals

Phan Thanh Bình (born 1 November 1986) is a retired Vietnamese footballer who played as a striker. He was a member of the Vietnam national football team. He is the youngest ever goal scorer for Vietnam, scoring against Nepal aged 16 years and 330 days. He is also the youngest player to represent Vietnam, making his debut in the same game.

After his retirement, Thanh Bình became a coach and managed his former club Đồng Tháp.

== International goals ==
=== Vietnam U-23 ===
#	Date	Venue	Opponent	Score	Result	Competition
1.	4 December 2003	Hanoi, Hàng Đẫy Stadium	Indonesia	1–0	1–0	2003 Southeast Asian Games
2.	9 December 2003	Hanoi, Mỹ Đình National Stadium	Malaysia	4–3	4–3	2003 Southeast Asian Games
3.	3 December 2007	Thailand, Municipality Stadium	Singapore	2–3	2–3	2005 Southeast Asian Games
4.	8 December 2007	Thailand, Municipality Stadium	Laos	2–1	2–1	2005 Southeast Asian Games
5.	4 December 2009	Vientiane, Laos National Stadium	Timor-Leste	3–0	4–0	2009 Southeast Asian Games
6.	6 December 2009	Vientiane, New Laos National Stadium	Malaysia	3–1	3–1	2009 Southeast Asian Games
7.	14 December 2009	Vientiane, Laos National Stadium	Singapore	1–1	4–1	2009 Southeast Asian Games

=== Vietnam ===
#	Date	Venue	Opponent	Score	Result	Competition
1.	September 27, 2003	Incheon, South Korea	Nepal	5–0	Win	2004 AFC Asian Cup qualification
2.	September 27, 2003	Incheon, South Korea	Nepal	5–0	Win	2004 AFC Asian Cup qualification
3.	October 24, 2003	Oman	Nepal	2–0	Win	2004 AFC Asian Cup qualification
4.	December 24, 2006	Bangkok, Thailand	Thailand	1–2	Lost	King's Cup 2006
5.	December 28, 2006	Bangkok, Thailand	Singapore	3–2	Win	King's Cup 2006
6.	December 30, 2006	Bangkok, Thailand	Thailand	1–3	Lost	King's Cup 2006
7.	January 17, 2007	Singapore	Laos	9–0	Win	ASEAN Football Championship
8.	January 17, 2007	Singapore	Laos	9–0	Win	ASEAN Football Championship
9.	January 17, 2007	Singapore	Laos	9–0	Win	ASEAN Football Championship
10.	January 17, 2007	Singapore	Laos	9–0	Win	ASEAN Football Championship
11.	June 30, 2007	Hanoi, Vietnam	Bahrain	5–3	Win	Friendly
12.	July 12, 2007	Hanoi, Vietnam	Qatar	1–1	Draw	2007 AFC Asian Cup
13.	December 10, 2008	Phuket, Thailand	Laos	4–0	Win	2008 AFF Suzuki Cup
