= Lê Quang Cường =

Vietnamese footballer (born 1983)

Personal information
- Full name: Lê Quang Cường
- Date of birth: January 2, 1983 (age 43)
- Place of birth: Đà Nẵng, Vietnam
- Height: 1.67 m (5 ft 6 in)
- Position: Defender

Youth career
- 1995–2001: SHB Đà Nẵng

Senior career*
Years	Team	Apps	(Gls)
2002–2013	SHB Đà Nẵng	301	(3)

International career
2005–2007	Vietnam U23	3	(0)
2008–2012	Vietnam	5	(1)
- * Club domestic league appearances and goals

Lê Quang Cường (born 2 January 1983) is a Vietnamese footballer who plays for SHB Đà Nẵng. He played for Vietnamese international at the 2008 AFF Suzuki Cup.

== Honors ==
SHB Đà Nẵng:

V-League: 2009, 2012

Vietnam:

ASEAN Football Championship: 2008
