= Nguyễn Minh Đức =

Vietnamese footballer

Personal information
- Full name: Nguyễn Minh Đức
- Date of birth: September 14, 1983 (age 43)
- Place of birth: Diễn Châu, Nghệ An, Vietnam
- Height: 1.73 m (5 ft 8 in)
- Position: Centre back

Youth career
- 1995–2002: Sông Lam Nghệ An

Senior career*
Years	Team	Apps	(Gls)
2003–2008	Sông Lam Nghệ An	59	(0)
2008–2011	Hải Phòng	32	(0)
2011–2012	Xuân Thành Sài Gòn Cement	21	(0)
2013–2014	Hải Phòng	10	(0)
2014–2016	Sông Lam Nghệ An	45	(0)

International career^{‡}
2004–2007	Vietnam U23	5	(0)
2006–2014	Vietnam	25	(0)
- * Club domestic league appearances and goals as of 26 February 2017 ‡ National team caps and goals as of 24 November 2012

Nguyễn Minh Đức (born 14 September 1983) is a Vietnamese footballer who plays for Sông Lam Nghệ An.

== Honors ==
=== With Sài Gòn ===
- 2011 Vietnamese First Division: Winner

=== With Vietnam national football team ===
- 2008 AFF Suzuki Cup: Winner

=== Individual ===
- ASEAN Football Federation Best XI: 2013
