= Nguyễn Minh Châu (footballer) =

Vietnamese footballer

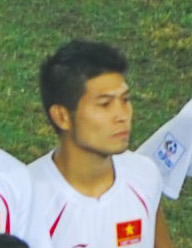
- Nguyễn Minh Châu in 2008

Personal information
- Full name: Nguyễn Minh Châu
- Date of birth: January 9, 1985 (age 41)
- Place of birth: Quảng Yên, Quảng Ninh, Vietnam
- Height: 1.65 m (5 ft 5 in)
- Position: Defensive midfielder

Youth career
- 1997–1998: Than Quảng Ninh
- 1998–2003: Hải Phòng

Senior career*
Years	Team	Apps	(Gls)
2003–2017	Hải Phòng	294	(1)

International career^{‡}
2008–2015	Vietnam	29	(0)
- * Club domestic league appearances and goals ‡ National team caps and goals as of 24 May 2015

Nguyễn Minh Châu (born January 9, 1985) is a retired Vietnamese footballer who played as a midfielder for Hải Phòng and was a member of Vietnam national football team.

== Life ==
Nguyen Minh Chau was born in a family of 7 children. He is the youngest, being the brother of 6 sisters. After graduating at Grade 12, Chau left Hai Phong to work in the U21 youth team.

== Career ==
At age of 17, Chau moved to Hai Phong from his home town of Quang Ninh to join the youth team of Hải Phòng. He later promote to the senior team to attend V-League. In 2008, coach Henrique Calisto called up Chau to attend the 2008 AFF Suzuki Cup with the Vietnam national football team. Then, he was a member of the Vietnamese team wins first AFF Championship title. In 2009, Nguyen Minh Chau was still attached to Haiphong Cement.

At the end of 2017, Minh Chau has finally announced his retirement.He is known as a legend in Haiphong FC for 14 years played for the club with 294 appearances. Now he is living in Australia with his family.

== Honours ==
Vietnam

ASEAN Football Championship

(gold) Champions : 2008
