= Trần Đức Cường =

Vietnamese footballer

Personal information
- Full name: Trần Đức Cường
- Date of birth: May 20, 1985 (age 41)
- Place of birth: Vinh, Nghệ An, Vietnam
- Height: 1.83 m (6 ft 0 in)
- Position: Goalkeeper

Youth career
- 1997–2000: Sông Lam Nghệ An

Senior career*
Years	Team	Apps	(Gls)
2000–2002	Sông Lam Nghệ An		
2003–2011	SHB Đà Nẵng		
2011–2012	Hòa Phát Hà Nội		
2012	Hà Nội		
2013	Becamex Bình Dương		
2014–2015	Sông Lam Nghệ An	18	(0)
2016–2022	Becamex Bình Dương	56	(0)

International career
2001–2002	Vietnam U23	20	(0)
2003–2010	Vietnam	3	(0)
- * Club domestic league appearances and goals

Trần Đức Cường (born May 20, 1985, in Vinh City, Nghệ An, Vietnam) is a Vietnamese former footballer who plays as a goalkeeper for Vietnamese club Becamex Bình Dương.

He is second goalkeeper of Vietnam national football team played at 2008 AFF Suzuki Cup.

== Club career ==
=== Becamex Bình Dương ===
Đức Cường signed a 2-year deal with Becamex Bình Dương in November 2015.

== Honours ==
Sông Lam Nghệ An

- V.League 1: 2000-01
- Vietnamese National Cup: 2002
- Vietnamese Super Cup: 2000, 2001, 2002

SHB Đà Nẵng

- V.League 1: 2009; Runner-up 2005
- Vietnamese National Cup: 2009
- Vietnamese Super Cup: Runner-up 2009

Becamex Bình Dương

- Vietnamese National Cup: 2018; Runner-up 2017
- Vietnamese Super Cup: 2016; Runner-up 2019

Vietnam

- AFF Championship: 2008
