= Trần Trường Giang =

Vietnamese footballer

Personal information
- Full name: Trần Trường Giang
- Date of birth: November 1, 1976 (age 49)
- Place of birth: Mỹ Tho, Tiền Giang, Vietnam
- Height: 1.70 m (5 ft 7 in)
- Position: Midfielder

Youth career
- 1988–1995: Tiền Giang

Senior career*
Years	Team	Apps	(Gls)
1996–2002	Tiền Giang	162	(30)
2002–2010	Bình Dương	112	(31)
2011–2014	Navibank Sài Gòn	48	(6)

International career
2002–2009	Vietnam	19	(3)
- * Club domestic league appearances and goals

Trần Trường Giang (born November 1, 1976) is a former Vietnamese footballer who played as a midfielder. He is a member of the Vietnam national football team from 2002 to 2009.

== Vietnam ==
#	Date	Venue	Opponent	Score	Result	Competition
1.	15 December 2002	Indonesia, Jakarta, Gelora Bung Karno Stadium	Cambodia	2-0	9-2	2002 AFF Championship
2.	15 December 2002	Indonesia, Jakarta, Gelora Bung Karno Stadium	Cambodia	4-1	9-2	2002 AFF Championship
3.	29 December 2002	Indonesia, Jakarta, Gelora Bung Karno Stadium	Malaysia	2–0	2-1	2002 AFF Championship

== Honours ==
Vietnam

- Third place AFF Championship: 2002
