= Huỳnh Quang Thanh =

Vietnamese footballer (born 1984)

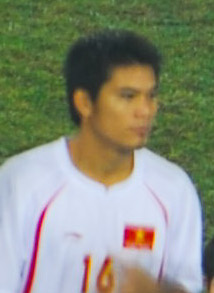
- Huynh Quang Thanh, 2008

Personal information
- Full name: Huỳnh Quang Thanh
- Date of birth: 10 October 1984 (age 42)
- Place of birth: Ho Chi Minh City, Vietnam
- Height: 1.75 m (5 ft 9 in)
- Position: Wing back

Youth career
- 1996–2002: Công An Hồ Chí Minh City

Senior career*
Years	Team	Apps	(Gls)
2003–2005	Ngân Hàng Đông Á	30	(0)
2005–2013	Becamex Bình Dương	83	(2)
2013–2018	Long An	134	(0)

International career
2006–2008	Vietnam U23	20	(1)
2005–2014	Vietnam	47	(4)
- * Club domestic league appearances and goals as of 20 October 2013

Huỳnh Quang Thanh (born 10 October 1984) is a Vietnamese former footballer who played as a defender. He was also the captain of the Vietnam national football team. He retired in 2018.

== International goal ==
Scores and results list Vietnam's goal tally first.

#	Date	Venue	Opponent	Score	Result	Competition
1.	8 July 2007	Mỹ Đình National Stadium, Hanoi, Vietnam	United Arab Emirates	1–0	2–0	2007 Asian Cup
2.	10 December 2008	Surakul Stadium, Phuket, Thailand	Laos	3–0	4–0	2008 AFF Suzuki Cup
3.	3 July 2011	Estádio Campo Desportivo, Taipa, Macau	Macau	1–0	7–1	2014 FIFA World Cup qualification
4.	3 July 2011	Estádio Campo Desportivo, Taipa, Macau	Macau	7–1	7–1	2014 FIFA World Cup qualification

== Honours ==
Vietnam

- ASEAN Football Championship: 2008

Bình Dương

- V-League: 2007, 2008
