= Đoàn Việt Cường =

Vietnamese footballer (born 1985)

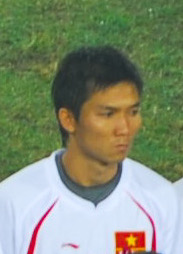
- Cường in 2008

Personal information
- Full name: Đoàn Việt Cường
- Date of birth: January 1, 1985 (age 41)
- Place of birth: Tam Nông, Đồng Tháp, Vietnam
- Height: 1.71 m (5 ft 7 in)
- Position: Full-back

Youth career
- 1996–2003: Đồng Tháp

Senior career*
Years	Team	Apps	(Gls)
2003–2009	Đồng Tháp	23	(3)
2009–2011	Hoàng Anh Gia Lai	41	(7)
2011–2012	Navibank Sài Gòn	22	(0)
2012–2013	Xuân Thành Sài Gòn	19	(0)
2017–2018	Hồ Chí Minh City	1	(0)
2020	Vĩnh Long	1	(0)

International career^{‡}
2003–2006	Vietnam U19	12	(2)
2006–2008	Vietnam U23	3	(5)
2007–2012	Vietnam	29	(0)
- * Club domestic league appearances and goals ‡ National team caps and goals as of September 15, 2009

Đoàn Việt Cường (born January 1, 1985) is a former Vietnamese footballer who played as a full-back. He represented Vietnam at the 2007 AFC Asian Cup and won the 2008 AFF Championship.

His father Đoàn Văn Phát was also a footballer.
