= Lê Phước Tứ =

Vietnamese footballer (born 1984)

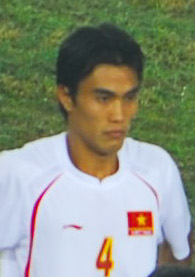
- Phước Tứ in 2009

Personal information
- Full name: Lê Phước Tứ
- Date of birth: 15 April 1984 (age 42)
- Place of birth: Đại Lộc, Quảng Nam, Vietnam
- Height: 1.78 m (5 ft 10 in)
- Position: Centre back

Team information
- Current team: Phù Đổng Ninh Bình (techinical director)

Youth career
- 1997–2001: Quân Khu 5

Senior career*
Years	Team	Apps	(Gls)
2002–2004	Quân khu 5	5	(0)
2005–2009	Thể Công	38	(1)
2010–2011	Lam Sơn Thanh Hóa	11	(1)
2011–2013	Xuân Thành Sài Gòn	24	(2)
2013	Quảng Nam		
2013–2014	Vissai Ninh Bình	7	(0)
2014–2016	Becamex Bình Dương	25	(0)

International career
2008–2014	Vietnam	38	(0)

Managerial career
- 2016–2019: PVF
- 2019–2021: Phố Hiến (assistant)
- 2023: Vietnam U-20 (assistant)
- 2023: Công An Hà Nội (assistant)
- 2023–2024: Vietnam U-23 (assistant)
- 2024–: Phù Đổng Ninh Bình (techinical director)
- * Club domestic league appearances and goals as of 20 September 2016

Lê Phước Tứ (born 15 April 1984) is a Vietnamese football manager and former footballer. He is currently the technical director of V.League 1 side Phù Đổng Ninh Bình. He was a regular member of the Vietnam national football team from 2008 to 2014, being a member of the 2008 AFF Championship winning team.

On 12 November 2014, he announced his retirement from international football after the 2014 AFF Championship semi-final loss to Malaysia.

== Honours ==
Lam Sơn Thanh Hóa

- Vietnamese Super Cup: 2009

Becamex Bình Dương

- Vietnamese Super Cup: 2013
- V.League 1: 2014, 2015
- Vietnamese Cup : 2015
- Mekong Club Championship: 2014

Thể Công

- V.League 2: 2007

Xuân Thành Sài Gòn

- V.League 2: 2011
- Vietnamese Cup : 2012

Vietnam

- AFF Championship : 2008
