= Nguyễn Vũ Phong =

Vietnamese footballer

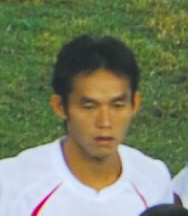
- Nguyễn Vũ Phong at the AFF Cup 2008

Personal information
- Full name: Nguyễn Vũ Phong
- Date of birth: February 6, 1985 (age 41)
- Place of birth: Tam Bình, Vĩnh Long, Vietnam
- Height: 1.68 m (5 ft 6 in)
- Positions: Attacking midfielder; winger

Youth career
- 1996–2001: Vĩnh Long

Senior career*
Years	Team	Apps	(Gls)
2002–2005	Vĩnh Long	49	(34)
2006–2013	Becamex Bình Dương	121	(26)
2014–2017	SHB Đà Nẵng	82	(17)
2019–2020	Bình Phước	18	(4)
2021	Vĩnh Long	1	(0)

International career^{‡}
2002–2003	Vietnam U18	6	(2)
2004–2005	Vietnam U20	7	(3)
2005–2007	Vietnam U23	23	(5)
2006–2014	Vietnam	48	(7)

Managerial career
- 2018: SHB Đà Nẵng (assistant)
- 2021–: Vĩnh Long
- * Club domestic league appearances and goals as of 22 September 2019 ‡ National team caps and goals as of 7 July 2014

Nguyễn Vũ Phong (born February 6, 1985) is a former Vietnamese footballer who currently coaches Vĩnh Long FC. Nguyễn Vũ Phong was a member of Vietnam national football team. Mainly an attacking midfielder, Phong is known for his speed and shooting ability. He is also the first Vietnamese footballer to receive a call-up to the Vietnam national football team from the Vietnamese Second Division in 2006.

== International goals ==
=== Vietnam ===
#	Date	Venue	Opponent	Score	Result	Competition
1.	December 8, 2008	Surakul Stadium, Phuket, Thailand	Malaysia	2–1	Won	2008 AFF Suzuki Cup
2.	December 8, 2008	Surakul Stadium, Phuket, Thailand	Malaysia	3–2	Won	2008 AFF Suzuki Cup
3.	December 24, 2008	Rajamangala Stadium, Bangkok, Thailand	Thailand	1–0	Won	2008 AFF Suzuki Cup
4.	January 14, 2009	Mỹ Đình National Stadium, Hanoi, Vietnam	Lebanon	3–1	Won	2011 AFC Asian Cup qualification
5.	January 21, 2009	Yellow Dragon Sports Center, Hangzhou, China	China	6–1	Lost	2011 AFC Asian Cup qualification
6.	December 2, 2010	Mỹ Đình National Stadium, Hanoi, Vietnam	Myanmar	7–1	Won	2010 AFF Suzuki Cup
7.	December 8, 2010	Mỹ Đình National Stadium, Hanoi, Vietnam	Singapore	1–0	Won	2010 AFF Suzuki Cup

== Honours ==
=== Club ===
Becamex Binh Duong F.C.

- V.League 1 (2): 2007, 2008
- Vietnamese Super Cup (2): 2007, 2008

=== International ===
- ASEAN Football Championship
  - Champion: 2008
  - Third place: 2007, 2010
- Vietnamese Golden Ball
  - Silver ball: 2009
  - Bronze ball: 2007, 2010
