= Henrique Calisto =

Portuguese footballer and manager

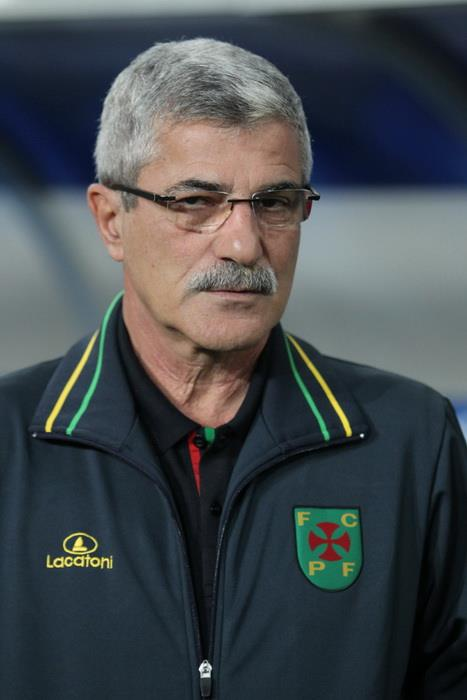
- Calisto with Paços de Ferreira in 2013

Personal information
- Full name: Henrique Manuel da Silva Calisto
- Date of birth: 16 October 1953 (age 73)
- Place of birth: Matosinhos, Portugal
- Position: Right-back

Youth career
- Leixões

Senior career*
Years	Team	Apps	(Gls)
1972–1975	Leixões	23	(1)
1977–1978	Fafe		

Managerial career
- 1980–1981: Boavista
- 1981–1983: Salgueiros
- 1983–1984: Boavista
- 1984–1985: Salgueiros
- 1985: Braga
- 1986–1988: Varzim
- 1988–1990: Académica
- 1990: Varzim
- 1991: Leixões
- 1992: Penafiel
- 1992–1993: Chaves
- 1994: Leixões
- 1995–1996: Rio Ave
- 1997: Paços Ferreira
- 1997–1998: Académica
- 1998–2000: Paços Ferreira
- 2001: Đồng Tâm Long An
- 2002: Vietnam
- 2003–2008: Đồng Tâm Long An
- 2008–2011: Vietnam
- 2011: Muangthong United
- 2011–2012: Paços Ferreira
- 2013: Libolo
- 2013–2014: Paços Ferreira
Medal record
Men's football
Representing Vietnam (as manager)
AFF Championship
Bronze medal – third place	2002
Winner	2008
- * Club domestic league appearances and goals

Henrique Manuel da Silva Calisto (born 16 October 1953) is a Portuguese manager who was most recently and former footballer who played as a right-back.

After his playing career ended he became a manager, taking charge of numerous clubs, mainly in Portugal, and also managed the Vietnamese national team.

== Playing career ==
Born in Matosinhos, Calisto played three seasons in the Primeira Liga with local Leixões. His best output consisted of 17 matches (one goal) in 1973–74, with the team finishing in 14th position.

Calisto retired from professional football in June 1978 at only 24, after one season with Fafe in the second division.

== Coaching career ==
=== Portugal ===
Calisto begun coaching at the age of only 26, leading Boavista to fourth in the 1980–81 season, recording nine wins, four draws and only lost two games in his 15 matches in charge.

He spent the following four years between Boavista and their Porto neighbours Salgueiros, winning the second division in 1982 and finishing the following season in tenth. His return to Boavista was also successful, with the club finishing seventh.

After only a few months in charge of Braga, Calisto joined fellow league side Varzim in the summer of 1986, where he made another division rise at a time when he reached a run of 17 games without losing. It was this season that saw the emergence of Rui Barros, a striker who, a year later, was an important figure at Porto and joined Juventus in 1988.

In 1988, he coached Académica de Coimbra. His tenure was a success with 31 wins in 48 matches on all fronts.

Afterwards, he faced the challenges with Penafiel, Chaves and Rio Ave. It was with Rio Ave that he won the second division in his first full season there. He completed the campaign at the helm of Paços de Ferreira, in one of several stints he had at the Estádio da Mata Real. In 1998/99, he achieved another promotion with Paços, with 20 wins in 36 matches.

In the 2011–12 season, Calisto returned to Paços for his third spell and brought them from last to tenth at the end of the season.

=== Asia ===
Calisto spent eight seasons at the helm of Đồng Tâm Long An in Vietnam, where he won two V.League 1 titles, and achieved five other top-three finishes. In March 2008, he was hired as head coach of the Vietnamese football team, leading it to its first ASEAN Football Championship title.

Calisto quit his job as national side coach on 2 March 2011. He had been criticised over poor performances at the 2010 AFF Suzuki Cup, and was appointed at Thai club Muangthong United the following week.

=== Africa and return to Portugal ===
In mid-February 2013, Calisto was appointed at Libolo in Angola. He returned to his country on 30 October of that year, however, replacing the fired Costinha at the helm of former team Paços, which ranked last in the league with only one win and one draw from eight games. On 24 February 2014, he was dismissed after a 4–0 loss against Vitória, having won two of his 12 games and the team in the same position.

He was appointed as sporting director at Dalian Professional F.C. from 18 March 2018 until 31 December 2019.

On 1 June 2025, he was appointed as President of the National Association of Football Coaches of Portugal.

== Honours ==
Rio Ave

- Liga de Honra: 1995–96

Đồng Tâm Long An

- V.League 1: 2005, 2006
- V.League 2: 2001–02
- Vietnamese National Cup: 2005
- Vietnamese Super Cup: 2006

Vietnam

- ASEAN Football Championship: 2008; third place 2002, 2010
- Southeast Asian Games: Silver medal 2009
