= List of Vietnam national football team captains =

This article lists all the captains of the Vietnam national football team.

The first Vietnam captain since their return to international stage in 1991 was Lê Khắc Chính.

The following table includes players who have captained the Vietnam national football team, along with the vice-captains and the international tournaments they led in.

== List of captains ==
Bold indicates current captain
Reserve captains include playerss who captained in place of the main captain in international competitive matches and friendlies

Year	Captain	Reserve captains	Tournaments	Ref.
1991–1993	Lê Khắc Chính	Nguyễn Mạnh Cường, Quản Trọng Hùng	1991 SEA Games, 1993 SEA Games	
1993–1997	Nguyễn Mạnh Cường	Nguyễn Văn Cường, Võ Hoàng Bửu	1995 SEA Games, 1996 AFF Championship	
1997–1999	Trần Công Minh	Lê Huỳnh Đức, Nguyễn Hữu Thắng, Võ Hoàng Bửu	1997 SEA Games, 1998 AFF Championship, 1998 Asian Games, 1999 SEA Games	
2000–2004	Lê Huỳnh Đức	Nguyễn Hồng Sơn, Nguyễn Đức Thắng, Nguyễn Hữu Thắng, Vũ Minh Hiếu	2000 AFF Championship, 2002 AFF Championship, 2004 AFF Championship	
2006–2008	Nguyễn Minh Phương	Nguyễn Huy Hoàng, Phan Văn Tài Em	2007 AFF Championship, 2007 AFC Asian Cup	
2008	Phan Văn Tài Em	Lê Công Vinh, Nguyễn Minh Phương	2008 AFF Championship	
2009–2010	Nguyễn Minh Phương	Phan Văn Tài Em, Vũ Như Thành	2010 AFF Championship	
2011–2012	Phan Văn Tài Em	Huỳnh Quang Thanh		
2012–2013	Nguyễn Minh Đức	Huỳnh Quang Thanh, Lê Tấn Tài, Phạm Thành Lương	2012 AFF Championship	
2014	Lê Tấn Tài	Lê Công Vinh, Nguyễn Minh Châu	2014 AFF Championship	
2015–2016	Lê Công Vinh	Nguyễn Văn Quyết, Phạm Thành Lương	2016 AFF Championship	
2017–2018	Nguyễn Văn Quyết	Đinh Thanh Trung, Lương Xuân Trường, Quế Ngọc Hải	2018 AFF Championship	
2018–2021	Quế Ngọc Hải	Đỗ Duy Mạnh, Đỗ Hùng Dũng, Lương Xuân Trường, Nguyễn Văn Quyết	2019 AFC Asian Cup, 2020 AFF Championship	
2022–2024	Đỗ Hùng Dũng	Bùi Tiến Dũng, Đỗ Duy Mạnh, Nguyễn Tuấn Anh, Quế Ngọc Hải	2022 AFF Championship, 2023 AFC Asian Cup	
2024–2026	Đỗ Duy Mạnh	Nguyễn Hoàng Đức, Nguyễn Quang Hải, Nguyễn Tiến Linh	2024 ASEAN Championship	
2026–present	Nguyễn Quang Hải	Nguyễn Hoàng Đức, Nguyễn Đình Bắc, Nguyễn Thành Chung, Nguyễn Xuân Son	2026 ASEAN Championship, 2026 FIFA ASEAN Cup	
