= List of Vietnam international footballers =

This is a list of Vietnam international footballers, who have played for the Vietnam national football team since its return to international stage in 1991.

| | Key |
|---|---|
| * | Still active for the national team (Note: Players who are still active for the national team are players who have not retired from international football and are, subsequently, eligible to be called up.) |
| = | Player is tied for the number of caps |
| GK | Goalkeeper |
| DF | Defender |
| MF | Midfielder |
| FW | Forward |

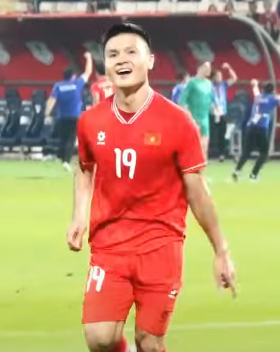
Nguyễn Quang Hải is currently Vietnam's most capped player.

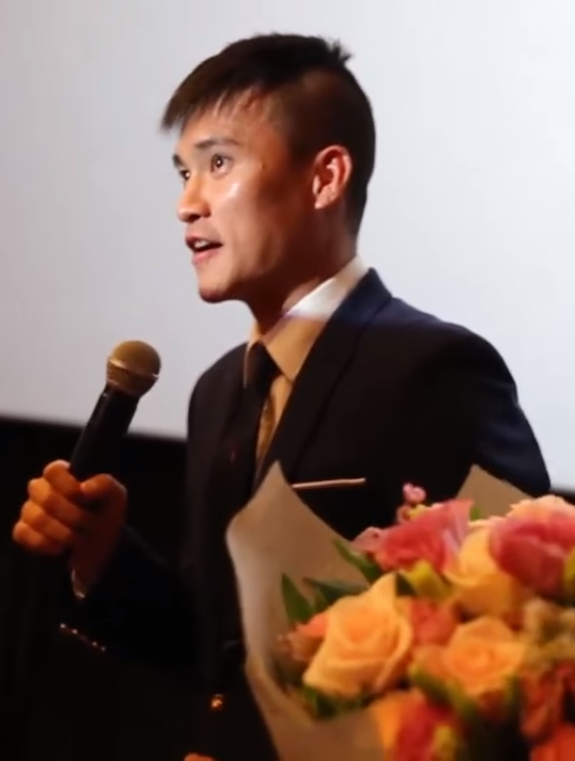
Lê Công Vinh is currently Vietnam's top goalscore.

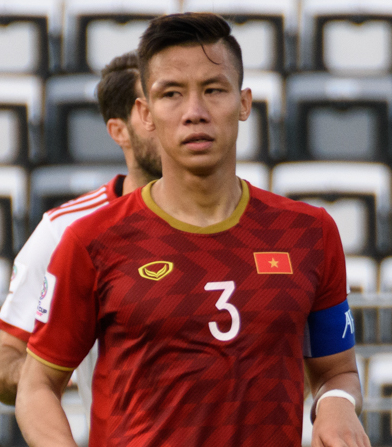
Quế Ngọc Hải captained Vietnam between 2018 and 2022.

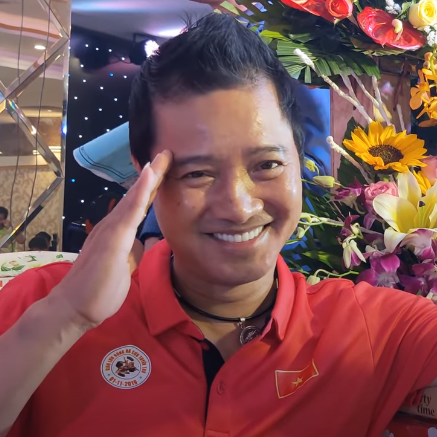
Nguyễn Hồng Sơn was the first Vietnamese international to reach 50 caps.

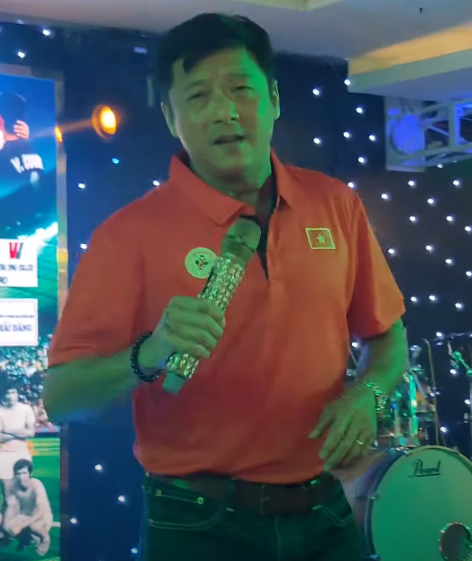
Lê Huỳnh Đức was Vietnam's leading goalscorer before Công Vinh.

As of 25 July 2026

Vietnam national team footballers of all times (10+ caps)
| Name | Position | National team career | Caps | Goals | Refs. |
|---|---|---|---|---|---|
| Nguyễn Quang Hải | MF | 2017–present | 88 | 16 | |
| Lê Công Vinh | FW | 2004–2016 | 83 | 51 | |
| Quế Ngọc Hải | DF | 2014–2024 | 80 | 6 | |
| Phạm Thành Lương | MF | 2008–2016 | 78 | 7 | |
| Nguyễn Trọng Hoàng | MF | 2009–2022 | 74 | 12 | |
| Nguyễn Minh Phương | MF | 2002–2010 | 73 | 11 | |
| Đỗ Duy Mạnh | DF | 2015–present | 73 | 2 | |
| Lê Huỳnh Đức | FW | 1993–2004 | 67 | 27 | |
| Nguyễn Tiến Linh | FW | 2018–present | 66 | 26 | |
| Nguyễn Văn Toàn | FW | 2016–present | 66 | 8 | |
| Lê Tấn Tài | MF | 2006–2014 | 64 | 3 | |
| Bùi Tiến Dũng | DF | 2015–present | 62 | 1 | |
| Nguyễn Hoàng Đức | MF | 2019–present | 58 | 2 | |
| Nguyễn Văn Quyết | FW | 2011–2024 | 58 | 16 | |
| Phan Văn Tài Em | MF | 2002–2011 | 58 | 6 | |
| Vũ Văn Thanh | DF | 2016–present | 58 | 5 | |
| Nguyễn Công Phượng | FW | 2015–present | 56 | 12 | |
| Nguyễn Hồng Sơn | MF | 1993–2001 | 53 | 18 | |
| Vũ Như Thành | DF | 2003–2010 | 50 | 2 | |
| Nguyễn Vũ Phong | MF | 2006–2014 | 48 | 7 | |
| Nguyễn Tuấn Anh | MF | 2016–2024 | 48 | 1 | |
| Đặng Văn Lâm | GK | 2017–present | 48 | 0 | |
| Huỳnh Quang Thanh | DF | 2006–2012 | 47 | 4 | |
| Phan Văn Đức | FW | 2018–2024 | 45 | 5 | |
| Đỗ Hùng Dũng | MF | 2018–2024 | 45 | 1 | |
| Trần Minh Quang | GK | 1997–2004 | 45 | 0 | |
| Võ Hoàng Bửu | MF | 1993–2000 | 42 | 9 | |
| Nguyễn Văn Sỹ | FW | 1997–2002 | 42 | 6 | |
| Triệu Quang Hà | FW | 1997–2002 | 42 | 2 | |
| Trần Công Minh | DF | 1995–2000 | 42 | 2 | |
| Nguyễn Đức Thắng | DF | 1997–2004 | 42 | 1 | |
| Phạm Tuấn Hải | FW | 2021–present | 41 | 10 | |
| Lương Xuân Trường | MF | 2016–2022 | 41 | 1 | |
| Nguyễn Quang Hải | FW | 2008–2015 | 40 | 7 | |
| Dương Hồng Sơn | GK | 2003–2012 | 40 | 0 | |
| Đoàn Văn Hậu | DF | 2017–present | 39 | 2 | |
| Nguyễn Việt Thắng | FW | 2001–2012 | 39 | 2 | |
| Lê Phước Tứ | DF | 2008–2014 | 38 | 0 | |
| Nguyễn Thành Chung | DF | 2018–present | 37 | 0 | |
| Nguyễn Anh Đức | FW | 2006–2013 | 37 | 12 | |
| Nguyễn Huy Hoàng | DF | 2002–2010 | 37 | 1 | |
| Đỗ Khải | DF | 1995–2000 | 37 | 0 | |
| Nguyễn Phong Hồng Duy | MF | 2017–2023 | 34 | 0 | |
| Phan Thanh Bình | FW | 2003–2009 | 33 | 13 | |
| Nguyễn Hữu Thắng | MF | 1995–1998 | 33 | 0 | |
| Trần Nguyên Mạnh | GK | 2014–2022 | 33 | 0 | |
| Đặng Phương Nam | FW | 1996–2007 | 32 | 10 | |
| Nguyễn Mạnh Cường | DF | 1991–1997 | 32 | 1 | |
| Hồ Tấn Tài | DF | 2021–present | 31 | 4 | |
| Đoàn Việt Cường | DF | 2007–2012 | 31 | 0 | |
| Nguyễn Minh Châu | MF | 2008–2015 | 30 | 0 | |
| Lê Hồng Minh | MF | 2001–2007 | 29 | 1 | |
| Phạm Hùng Dũng | DF | 2000–2007 | 28 | 1 | |
| Bùi Hoàng Việt Anh | DF | 2022–present | 27 | 1 | |
| Nguyễn Văn Biển | DF | 2006–2014 | 27 | 2 | |
| Phạm Xuân Mạnh | DF | 2018–present | 26 | 3 | |
| Nguyễn Thanh Bình | DF | 2021–present | 26 | 1 | |
| Nguyễn Minh Đức | DF | 2006–2012 | 26 | 0 | |
| Nguyễn Thiện Quang | DF | 1996–1999 | 26 | 0 | |
| Nguyễn Hữu Đang | FW | 1995–2002 | 25 | 3 | |
| Phạm Văn Quyến | FW | 2002–2005 | 14 | 7 | |
| Nguyễn Hồng Phẩm | | | | | |
| Trần Xuân Lý | | | | | |
| Quản Trọng Hùng | | | | | |
| Đoàn Ngọc Tuấn | | | | | |
| Chu Văn Mui | | | | | |
| Lê Khắc Chính | | | | | |
| Lê Xuân Thăng | | | | | |
| Hà Vương Ngầu Nai | | | | | |
| Lư Đình Tuấn | | | | | |
| Nguyễn Mạnh Cuờng | | | | | |
| Định Thế Nam | | | | | |
| Lưu Tấn Liêm | | | | | |
| Nguyễn Văn Dũng | | | | | |
| Đỗ Văn Minh | | | | | |
