= Vietnamese Golden Ball =

Vietnamese association football award

Quả bóng vàng Việt Nam
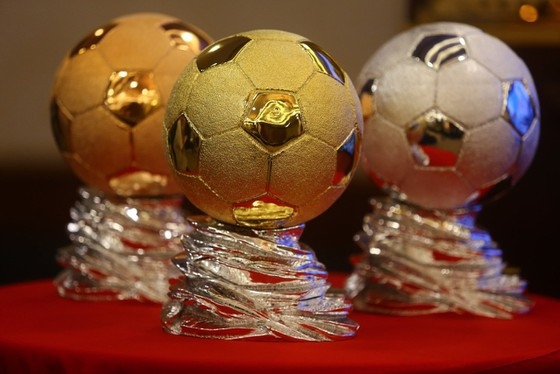
- (From left to right) Three current Vietnamese bronze, gold and silver football titles
- Description: Best Vietnamese football player of the year
- Presented by: Sài Gòn Giải Phóng newspaper
- First award: 1995
- Website: Sài Gòn Giải Phóng Newspaper

Vietnamese Golden Ball (Vietnamese: Quả bóng vàng Việt Nam), also referred to as Vietnamese Footballer of the Year, is an annual association football award for the best performances of Vietnamese footballer over the previous year. Presented since 1995 by Sài Gòn Giải Phóng Newspaper. The first winner was striker Le Huynh Duc. Since 2001, It also awards Young Player of the Year, Best Woman Player of the year and Best Foreign Player of the year. The current holder of the men's Golden Ball award, as selected in 2025, is Ninh Binh's striker Nguyễn Hoàng Đức.

== Best Man Player of the year ==
Year	Golden Ball		Silver Ball		Bronze Ball	
Year	Name	Club(s)	Name	Club(s)	Name	Club(s)
1995	Lê Huỳnh Đức	Hồ Chí Minh City Police	Nguyễn Văn Cường	Bình Định	Nguyễn Hữu Đang	Khánh Hòa
1996	Võ Hoàng Bửu	Thép Miền Nam - Cảng Sài Gòn	Trần Công Minh	Đồng Tháp	Nguyễn Hồng Sơn	Thể Công
1997	Lê Huỳnh Đức (2)	Hồ Chí Minh City Police	Nguyễn Hữu Thắng	P. Sông Lam Nghệ An	Trần Công Minh	Đồng Tháp
1998	Nguyễn Hồng Sơn	Thể Công	Lê Huỳnh Đức	Hồ Chí Minh City Police	Trần Công Minh	Đồng Tháp
1999	Trần Công Minh	Đồng Tháp	Lê Huỳnh Đức	Hồ Chí Minh City Police	Nguyễn Hồng Sơn	Thể Công
2000	Nguyễn Hồng Sơn (2)	Thể Công	Lê Huỳnh Đức	Hồ Chí Minh City Police	Đỗ Văn Khải	Hải Quan
2001	Võ Văn Hạnh	P. Sông Lam Nghệ An	Đỗ Văn Khải	Hải Quan	Lưu Ngọc Mai (Note: For the only time, a woman receive the award along with the men.)	Hồ Chí Minh City I
2002	Lê Huỳnh Đức (3)	Ngân hàng Đông Á	Trần Minh Quang	Bình Định	Huỳnh Hồng Sơn	Cảng Sài Gòn
2003	Phạm Văn Quyến	P. Sông Lam Nghệ An	Phan Văn Tài Em	Đồng Tâm Long An	Nguyễn Hữu Thắng	Bình Dương
2004	Lê Công Vinh	P. Sông Lam Nghệ An	Thạch Bảo Khanh	Thể Công	Phan Văn Tài Em	Đồng Tâm Long An
2005	Phan Văn Tài Em	Đồng Tâm Long An	Lê Công Vinh	P. Sông Lam Nghệ An	Lê Tấn Tài	Khatoco Khánh Hòa
2006	Lê Công Vinh (2)	P. Sông Lam Nghệ An	Nguyễn Minh Phương	Đồng Tâm Long An	Lê Tấn Tài	Khatoco Khánh Hòa
2007	Lê Công Vinh (3)	P. Sông Lam Nghệ An	Nguyễn Minh Phương	Đồng Tâm Long An	Nguyễn Vũ Phong	Bình Dương
2008	Dương Hồng Sơn	Hà Nội T&T	Vũ Như Thành	Bình Dương	Lê Công Vinh	Hà Nội T&T
2009	Phạm Thành Lương	Hà Nội ACB	Nguyễn Vũ Phong	Bình Dương	Bùi Tấn Trường	Đồng Tháp
2010	Nguyễn Minh Phương	Đồng Tâm Long An	Phạm Thành Lương	Hà Nội ACB	Nguyễn Vũ Phong	Becamex Bình Dương
2011	Phạm Thành Lương (2)	Hà Nội ACB	Nguyễn Trọng Hoàng	Sông Lam Nghệ An	Huỳnh Kesley Alves	Xuân Thành Sài Gòn
2012	Huỳnh Quốc Anh	SHB Đà Nẵng	Lê Tấn Tài	Khatoco Khánh Hòa	Nguyễn Minh Phương	SHB Đà Nẵng
2013	—		—		—	
2014	Phạm Thành Lương (3)	Hà Nội T&T	Nguyễn Văn Quyết	Hà Nội T&T	Lê Công Vinh	Sông Lam Nghệ An
2015	Nguyễn Anh Đức	Becamex Bình Dương	Nguyễn Văn Quyết	Hà Nội T&T	Lê Công Vinh	Becamex Bình Dương
2016	Phạm Thành Lương (4)	Hà Nội T&T	Lương Xuân Trường	Incheon United	Vũ Minh Tuấn	Than Quảng Ninh
2017	Đinh Thanh Trung	Quảng Nam	Nguyễn Anh Đức	Becamex Bình Dương	Nguyễn Quang Hải	Hà Nội FC
2018	Nguyễn Quang Hải	Hà Nội FC	Nguyễn Anh Đức	Becamex Bình Dương	Phan Văn Đức	Sông Lam Nghệ An
2019	Đỗ Hùng Dũng	Hà Nội FC	Nguyễn Quang Hải	Hà Nội FC	Nguyễn Trọng Hoàng	Viettel
2020	Nguyễn Văn Quyết	Hà Nội FC	Bùi Tiến Dũng	Viettel	Quế Ngọc Hải	Viettel
2021	Nguyễn Hoàng Đức	Viettel	Nguyễn Quang Hải	Hà Nội FC	Nguyễn Tiến Linh	Becamex Bình Dương
2022	Nguyễn Văn Quyết (2)	Hà Nội FC	Nguyễn Tiến Linh	Becamex Bình Dương	Nguyễn Hoàng Đức	Viettel
2023	Nguyễn Hoàng Đức (2)	Thể Công-Viettel	Phạm Tuấn Hải	Hà Nội FC	Đặng Văn Lâm	MerryLand Quy Nhơn Bình Định
2024	Nguyễn Tiến Linh	Becamex Bình Dương	Nguyễn Hoàng Đức	Phù Đổng Ninh Bình	Phạm Tuấn Hải	Hà Nội FC
2025	Nguyễn Hoàng Đức (3)	Ninh Binh	Nguyễn Đình Bắc	Công An Hà Nội	Nguyễn Quang Hải	Công An Hà Nội

=== Wins by player ===
Player	1st	2nd	3rd
Phạm Thành Lương	4 (2009, 2011, 2014, 2016)	1 (2010)	—
Lê Huỳnh Đức	3 (1995, 1997, 2002)	3 (1998, 1999, 2000)	—
Lê Công Vinh	3 (2004, 2006, 2007)	1 (2005)	3 (2008, 2014, 2015)
Nguyễn Hoàng Đức	3 (2021, 2023, 2025)	1 (2024)	1 (2022)
Nguyễn Văn Quyết	2 (2020, 2022)	2 (2014, 2015)	–
Nguyễn Hồng Sơn	2 (1998, 2000)	—	2 (1996, 1999)
Nguyễn Minh Phương	1 (2010)	2 (2006, 2007)	1 (2012)
Nguyễn Quang Hải	1 (2018)	2 (2019, 2021)	2 (2017, 2025)
Nguyễn Anh Đức	1 (2015)	2 (2017, 2018)	—
Trần Công Minh	1 (1999)	1 (1996)	2 (1997, 1998)
Phan Văn Tài Em	1 (2005)	1 (2003)	1 (2004)
Nguyễn Tiến Linh	1 (2024)	1 (2022)	1 (2021)
Võ Hoàng Bửu	1 (1996)	—	—
Võ Văn Hạnh	1 (2001)	—	—
Phạm Văn Quyến	1 (2003)	—	—
Dương Hồng Sơn	1 (2008)	—	—
Huỳnh Quốc Anh	1 (2012)	—	—
Đinh Thanh Trung	1 (2017)	—	—
Đỗ Hùng Dũng	1 (2019)	—	—
Nguyễn Vũ Phong	—	1 (2009)	2 (2007, 2010)
Lê Tấn Tài	—	1 (2012)	2 (2005, 2006)
Nguyễn Trọng Hoàng	—	1 (2011)	1 (2019)
Đỗ Văn Khải	—	1 (2001)	1 (2000)
Phạm Tuấn Hải	—	1 (2023)	1 (2024)
Nguyễn Văn Cường	—	1 (1995)	—
Nguyễn Hữu Thắng (born 1972)	—	1 (1997)	—
Trần Minh Quang	—	1 (2002)	—
Thạch Bảo Khanh	—	1 (2004)	—
Vũ Như Thành	—	1 (2008)	—
Lương Xuân Trường	—	1 (2016)	—
Bùi Tiến Dũng	—	1 (2020)	—
Nguyễn Đình Bắc	—	1 (2025)	—
Nguyễn Hữu Đang	—	—	1 (1995)
Huỳnh Hồng Sơn	—	—	1 (2002)
Nguyễn Hữu Thắng (born 1980)	—	—	1 (2003)
Bùi Tấn Trường	—	—	1 (2009)
Huỳnh Kesley Alves	—	—	1 (2011)
Vũ Minh Tuấn	—	—	1 (2016)
Phan Văn Đức	—	—	1 (2018)
Quế Ngọc Hải	—	—	1 (2020)
Đặng Văn Lâm	—	—	1 (2023)

=== Wins by club ===
Club	Players
Hà Nội FC	7
Sông Lam Nghệ An	5
Thể Công-Viettel	4
Hồ Chí Minh City Police	3
Long An	2
Becamex Bình Dương	2
Hồ Chí Minh City FC	1
Hà Nội ACB	1
SHB Đà Nẵng	1
Quảng Nam	1
Đồng Tháp	1
Ninh Binh	1

== Best Woman Player of the year ==
Year	Golden Ball		Silver Ball		Bronze Ball	
Year	Name	Club(s)	Name	Club(s)	Name	Club(s)
2001	Lưu Ngọc Mai	Hồ Chí Minh City I				
2002	Nguyễn Thị Kim Hồng	Hồ Chí Minh City I				
2003	Văn Thị Thanh	Phong Phú Hà Nam	Lưu Ngọc Mai	Hồ Chí Minh City I	Phùng Thị Minh Nguyệt	Hà Nội
2004	Đoàn Thị Kim Chi	Hồ Chí Minh City I	Đỗ Hồng Tiến	Hồ Chí Minh City I	Trần Thị Kim Hồng	Hồ Chí Minh City I
2005	Đoàn Thị Kim Chi (2)	Hồ Chí Minh City I	Văn Thị Thanh	Phong Phú Hà Nam	Đào Thị Miện	Hà Tây
2006	Đào Thị Miện	Hà Tây	Đoàn Thị Kim Chi	Hồ Chí Minh City I	Bùi Thị Tuyết Mai	Hà Nội
2007	Đoàn Thị Kim Chi (3)	Hồ Chí Minh City I	Đào Thị Miện	Hà Tây	Trần Thị Kim Hồng	Hồ Chí Minh City I
2008	Đỗ Thị Ngọc Châm	Hà Nội	Đào Thị Miện	Hà Nội	Trần Thị Kim Hồng	Hồ Chí Minh City I
2009	Đoàn Thị Kim Chi (4)	Hồ Chí Minh City I	Đặng Thị Kiều Trinh	Hồ Chí Minh City I	Đào Thị Miện	Hà Nội
2010	Trần Thị Kim Hồng	Hồ Chí Minh City I	Đặng Thị Kiều Trinh	Hồ Chí Minh City I	Nguyễn Ngọc Anh	Hà Nội
2011	Đặng Thị Kiều Trinh	Hồ Chí Minh City I	Lê Thị Thương	Than Khoáng Sản Việt Nam	Nguyễn Thị Muôn	Hà Nội
2012	Đặng Thị Kiều Trinh (2)	Hồ Chí Minh City I	Lê Thị Thương	Than Khoáng Sản Việt Nam	Nguyễn Thị Ngọc Anh	Hà Nội
2014	Nguyễn Thị Tuyết Dung	Phong Phú Hà Nam	Đặng Thị Kiều Trinh	Hồ Chí Minh City I	Nguyễn Thị Minh Nguyệt	Hà Nội
2015	Nguyễn Thị Minh Nguyệt	Hà Nội	Nguyễn Thị Tuyết Dung	Phong Phú Hà Nam	Huỳnh Như	Hồ Chí Minh City I
2016	Huỳnh Như	Hồ Chí Minh City I	Chương Thị Kiều	Hồ Chí Minh City I	Đặng Thị Kiều Trinh	Hồ Chí Minh City I
2017	Đặng Thị Kiều Trinh (3)	Hồ Chí Minh City I	Nguyễn Thị Tuyết Dung	Phong Phú Hà Nam	Huỳnh Như	Hồ Chí Minh City I
2018	Nguyễn Thị Tuyết Dung (2)	Phong Phú Hà Nam	Huỳnh Như	Hồ Chí Minh City I	Chương Thị Kiều	Hồ Chí Minh City I
2019	Huỳnh Như (2)	Hồ Chí Minh City I	Chương Thị Kiều	Hồ Chí Minh City I	Nguyễn Thị Tuyết Dung	Phong Phú Hà Nam
2020	Huỳnh Như (3)	Hồ Chí Minh City I	Phạm Hải Yến	Hà Nội	Trần Thị Kim Thanh	Hồ Chí Minh City I
2021	Huỳnh Như (4)	Hồ Chí Minh City I	Phạm Hải Yến	Hà Nội	Nguyễn Thị Bích Thùy	Hồ Chí Minh City I
2022	Huỳnh Như (5)	Länk FC Vilaverdense	Trần Thị Thùy Trang	Hồ Chí Minh City I	Nguyễn Thị Bích Thùy	Hồ Chí Minh City I
2023	Trần Thị Kim Thanh	Hồ Chí Minh City I	Huỳnh Như	Länk FC Vilaverdense	Nguyễn Thị Bích Thùy	Hồ Chí Minh City I
2024	Trần Thị Thùy Trang	Hồ Chí Minh City I	Nguyễn Thị Tuyết Ngân	Hồ Chí Minh City I	Dương Thị Vân	Than Khoáng Sản Việt Nam
2025	Nguyễn Thị Bích Thùy	Thái Nguyên T&T	Phạm Hải Yến	Hà Nội I	Trần Thị Thùy Trang	Hồ Chí Minh City I

== Futsal ==
Year	Golden Ball		Silver Ball		Bronze Ball	
Year	Name	CLUB	Name	CLUB	Name	CLUB
2015	Trần Văn Vũ	Thái Sơn Nam				
2016	Trần Văn Vũ (2)	Thái Sơn Nam	Nguyễn Minh Trí	Thái Sơn Nam	Nguyễn Bảo Quân	Thái Sơn Nam
2017	Phùng Trọng Luân	Thái Sơn Nam	Phạm Đức Hòa	Thái Sơn Nam	Trần Văn Vũ	Thái Sơn Nam
2018	Vũ Quốc Hưng	Hải Phương Nam	Hồ Văn Ý	Thái Sơn Nam	Phạm Đức Hòa	Thái Sơn Nam
2019	Trần Văn Vũ (3)	Thái Sơn Nam	Nguyễn Minh Trí	Thái Sơn Nam	Phạm Đức Hòa	Thái Sơn Nam
2020	Nguyễn Minh Trí	Thái Sơn Nam	Hồ Văn Ý	Thái Sơn Nam	Phùng Trọng Luân	Sanatech Khánh Hòa
2021	Hồ Văn Ý	Thái Sơn Nam	Châu Đoàn Phát	Thái Sơn Nam	Nguyễn Minh Trí	Thái Sơn Nam
2022	Hồ Văn Ý (2)	Thái Sơn Nam	Khổng Đình Hùng	Sahako	Châu Đoàn Phát	Thái Sơn Nam
2023	Phạm Đức Hòa	Thái Sơn Nam	Châu Đoàn Phát	Thái Sơn Nam	Hồ Văn Ý	Thái Sơn Nam
2024	Nguyễn Thịnh Phát	Thái Sơn Nam	Nguyễn Mạnh Dũng	Thái Sơn Nam	Phạm Văn Tú	Thái Sơn Bắc
2025	Châu Đoàn Phát	Thái Sơn Nam	Từ Minh Quang	Thái Sơn Bắc	Nguyễn Đa Hải	Thái Sơn Bắc

== Young Player of the Year ==
Year	Men		Women	
Year	Player	Club(s)	Player	Club(s)
2000	Phạm Văn Quyến	Sông Lam Nghệ An		
2001	Nguyễn Huy Hoàng	Sông Lam Nghệ An		
2002	Phạm Văn Quyến (2)	Sông Lam Nghệ An		
2003	Phan Thanh Bình	Đồng Tháp		
2004	Lê Công Vinh	Sông Lam Nghệ An		
2005	Lê Tấn Tài	Khatoco Khánh Hòa		
2006	Nguyễn Thành Long Giang	Tiền Giang		
2007	Nguyễn Thành Long Giang (2)	Tiền Giang/Hà Nội T&T		
2008	Phạm Thành Lương	Hà Nội ACB		
2009	Nguyễn Trọng Hoàng	Sông Lam Nghệ An		
2010	Nguyễn Văn Quyết	Hà Nội T&T		
2011	Nguyễn Văn Quyết (2)	Hà Nội T&T		
2012	Trần Phi Sơn	Sông Lam Nghệ An	Chương Thị Kiều	Hồ Chí Minh City I
2014	Nguyễn Tuấn Anh	Hoàng Anh Gia Lai	Lê Hoài Lương	Hồ Chí Minh City I
2015	Nguyễn Công Phượng	Hoàng Anh Gia Lai	Chương Thị Kiều (2)	Hồ Chí Minh City I
2016	Vũ Văn Thanh	Hoàng Anh Gia Lai	Lê Hoài Lương (2)	Hồ Chí Minh City I
2017	Đoàn Văn Hậu	Hà Nội F.C	Nguyễn Thị Vạn	Than Khoáng Sản Việt Nam
2018	Đoàn Văn Hậu (2)	Hà Nội F.C	Nguyễn Thị Tuyết Ngân	Hồ Chí Minh City I
2019	Đoàn Văn Hậu (3)	Hà Nội F.C/SC Heerenveen	Nguyễn Thị Tuyết Ngân (2)	Hồ Chí Minh City I
2020	Bùi Hoàng Việt Anh	Hà Nội F.C	Ngân Thị Vạn Sự	Hà Nội I
2021	Not awarded			
2022	Khuất Văn Khang	Viettel	Vũ Thị Hoa	Hà Nội I
2023	Nguyễn Thái Sơn	Đông Á Thanh Hóa	Ngọc Minh Chuyên	Thái Nguyên T&T
2024	Bùi Vĩ Hào	Becamex Bình Dương	Vũ Thị Hoa	Phong Phú Hà Nam
2025	Nguyễn Đình Bắc	Công An Hà Nội	Lưu Hoàng Vân	Phong Phú Hà Nam

== Best Foreign Player of the year ==
Year	Player	Nationality	Club
2000	Iddi Batambuze	Uganda	Sông Lam Nghệ An
2001	Iddi Batambuze (2)	Uganda	Sông Lam Nghệ An
2002	Fabio Santos	Brazil	Gạch Đồng Tâm Long An
2003	Kiatisuk Senamuang	Thailand	Hoàng Anh Gia Lai
2004	Kiatisuk Senamuang (2)	Thailand	Hoàng Anh Gia Lai
2005	Kesley Alves	Brazil	Becamex Bình Dương
2006	Elenildo De Jesus	Brazil	Cảng Sài Gòn
2007	Almeida	Brazil	SHB Đà Nẵng
2008	Almeida (2)	Brazil	SHB Đà Nẵng
2009	Gastón Merlo	Argentina	SHB Đà Nẵng
2010	Samson Kayode	Nigeria	Hà Nội T&T
2011	Gastón Merlo (2)	Argentina	SHB Đà Nẵng
2012	Gastón Merlo (3)	Argentina	SHB Đà Nẵng
2014	Abass Dieng	Senegal	Becamex Bình Dương
2015	Abass Dieng (2)	Senegal	Becamex Bình Dương
2016	Gaston Merlo (4)	Argentina	SHB Đà Nẵng
2017	Claudecir	Brazil	Quảng Nam
2018	Ganiyu Oseni	Nigeria	Hà Nội F.C
2019	Pape Omar Faye	Senegal	Hà Nội F.C
2020	Bruno Cantanhede	Brazil	Viettel
2021	Not awarded		
2022	Rimario Gordon	Jamaica	Hải Phòng
2023	Rafaelson	Brazil	Thép Xanh Nam Định
2024	Rafaelson (2)	Brazil	Thép Xanh Nam Định
2025	Alan Grafite	Brazil	Công An Hà Nội

== Most favorite players ==
Year	Player	Club
2016	Lương Xuân Trường	Hoàng Anh Gia Lai
2017	Nguyễn Công Phượng	Hoàng Anh Gia Lai
2018	Nguyễn Công Phượng	Hoàng Anh Gia Lai
2019	—	
2025	Nguyễn Đình Bắc	Công An Hà Nội

== See also ==
- V.League Awards
