= 2006 V-League =

V-League
- Season: 2006
- Dates: 15 January – 20 August
- Champions: Gạch Đồng Tâm Long An (2nd title)
- Runner up: Bình Dương
- Relegated: Mitsustar Hải Phòng; Tiền Giang
- 2007 AFC Champions League: Gạch Đồng Tâm Long An
- Matches: 156
- Goals: 379 (2.43 per match)
- Top goalscorer: Elenildo De Jesus (18 goals)

The 2006 V-League, also known as the 2006 Eurowindow V-League for sponsorship reasons, was the 23rd season of the V-League and the 6th as a professional league. The season began on 15 January and concluded on 20 August 2006.

Gạch Đồng Tâm Long An won their second title in this season.

== League table ==
Pos	Team	Pld	W	D	L	GF	GA	GD	Pts	Qualification or relegation
1	Đồng Tâm Long An (C)	24	12	4	8	38	32	+6	40	Qualification for 2007 AFC Champions League Group stage
2	Becamex Bình Dương	24	11	6	7	33	25	+8	39	
3	Bình Định	24	9	9	6	32	22	+10	36	
4	Hoàng Anh Gia Lai	24	10	6	8	24	21	+3	36	
5	Sông Lam Nghệ An	24	9	9	6	27	27	0	36	
6	Khatoco Khánh Hòa	24	10	5	9	30	25	+5	35	
7	SHB Đà Nẵng	24	9	7	8	32	27	+5	34	
8	Hà Nội ACB	24	9	6	9	28	31	−3	33	
9	Mikado Nam Định	24	9	5	10	22	28	−6	32	
10	Thép Miền Nam-Cảng Sài Gòn	24	7	8	9	35	38	−3	29	
11	Hòa Phát Hà Nội	24	7	6	11	30	41	−11	27	Qualification for 2007 AFC Cup Group stage (Note: As the Vietnamese Cup 2006 winner)
12	Mitsustar Hải Phòng (R)	24	5	9	10	31	36	−5	24	Qualification to Relegation play-offs
13	Thép Pomina Tiền Giang (R)	24	5	8	11	17	26	−9	23	Relegation to Vietnam First Division

Updated to match(es) played on August 20, 2006. Source: Thể thao Việt Nam
Rules for classification: 1) points; 2) goal difference; 3) number of goals scored.
(C) Champions; (R) Relegated

== Relegation play-offs ==
30 August 2006

Mitsustar Hải Phòng	1–1 (a.e.t.)	Huda Huế
Nsengiyumva 35'		Marcelo 21'
Penalties
	3–4

Thiên Trường Stadium, Nam Định
Referee: Dương Mạnh Hùng

== Dream Team ==
- Manager (Portugal) Henrique Calisto

Goalkeepers	Defenders	Midfielders	Forwards
(Brazil) Fabio Santos (Gạch Đồng Tâm Long An)	(Vietnam) Phùng Văn Nhiên (Mikado Nam Định) (Vietnam) Nguyễn Huy Hoàng (Sông Lam Nghệ An) (Thailand) Nirut Surasiang (Pisico Bình Định) (Vietnam) Minh Trung (Cảng Sài Gòn)	(Vietnam) Nguyễn Minh Phương (Gạch Đồng Tâm Long An) (Ghana) Shamo Abbey (Becamex Bình Dương) (Vietnam) Phan Văn Tài Em (Gạch Đồng Tâm Long An)	(Brazil) Antonio Carlos (Gạch Đồng Tâm Long An) (Vietnam) Lê Công Vinh (Sông Lam Nghệ An) (Brazil) Elenildo de Jesus (Cảng Sài Gòn)
