= Nguyễn Hữu Thắng =

Nguyen Huu Thang or Nguyễn Hữu Thắng may refer to:

- Nguyễn Hữu Thắng (official), former general director of Vietnam Railway Authority (VNRA), a government agency of the Vietnamese Ministry of Transport
- Nguyễn Hữu Thắng (footballer, born 1972), Vietnamese former sweeper and currently manager and coach of Sông Lam Nghệ An F.C.
- Nguyễn Hữu Thắng (footballer, born 1980), Vietnamese former midfielder.
- Nguyễn Hữu Thắng (footballer, born 2000), Vietnamese midfielder who currently plays for Thể Công-Viettel.
