= Batambuze =

Batambuze is a surname. Notable people with the surname include:

- Iddi Batambuze (born 1972), Ugandan footballer
- Shafik Batambuze (born 1994), Ugandan footballer
