= 2010 AFF Championship =

Kejuaraan Sepak Bola ASEAN 2010 (Indonesian) Giải vô địch bóng đá Đông Nam Á 2010 (Vietnamese)

Tournament details
- Host country: Indonesia; Vietnam (for group stage)
- Dates: 1–29 December
- Teams: 8
- Venues: 4 (in 4 host cities)

Final positions
- Champions: Malaysia (1st title)
- Runners-up: Indonesia

Tournament statistics
- Matches played: 18
- Goals scored: 51 (2.83 per match)
- Top scorer(s): (Malaysia) Safee Sali (5 goals)
- Best player: (Indonesia) Firman Utina
- Fair play award: Philippines

The 2010 AFF Championship, sponsored by Suzuki and P&G and officially known as the 2010 AFF Suzuki Cup, was the 8th edition of the AFF Championship, took place on 1–29 December 2010. Indonesia and Vietnam hosted the group stage from 1 to 8 December. Two-legged home-and-away semi-finals and finals were held between 15 and 29 December 2010.

Vietnam were the defending champions, but were eliminated by Malaysia in the semi-finals. Indonesia appeared in their fourth final while the Philippines qualified for the semi-finals for the first time under the management of Simon McMenemy. Malaysia subsequently won their first ever title since they first appeared in the final in the inaugural edition, beating Indonesia 4–2 on aggregate in the finals. Malaysia became the first nation to win the AFF Cup (including tournaments held under earlier formats), despite losing two games in the tournament (both to Indonesia).

== Hosts ==
On 17 February 2009, Vietnam declared their interest in hosting the group stage. On 21 April 2009, the Vietnamese newspaper VietNamNet announced that Vietnam would co-host the group stage along with Indonesia.

== Venues ==
There were two main venues; the Gelora Bung Karno Stadium in Jakarta and the My Dinh National Stadium in Hanoi with two secondary venues which will be used simultaneously with the main venue on the final match day of the group stage. Originally, the secondary venue for Group B was the Hàng Đẫy Stadium in Hanoi. However, on 22 November 2010, the Vietnam Football Federation (VFF) announced that it would not be ready in time for the tournament due to ongoing renovations and was replaced by the Thiên Trường Stadium. For Group A, the original secondary venue was the Si Jalak Harupat Stadium in Bandung but on 24 November 2010 a week after an AFF meeting, it was announced that it would be replaced with the Gelora Sriwijaya Stadium. Teams qualifying for the semi-finals would also host a game, in this case, Malaysia whom qualified used their Bukit Jalil National Stadium for the semi-final and final.

| Location of stadiums of the 2010 AFF Championship. Yellow: Group Stage. Red: Final. | (Indonesia) Jakarta | (Indonesia) Palembang | (Vietnam) Hanoi | (Vietnam) Nam Dinh | (Malaysia) Kuala Lumpur |
|---|---|---|---|---|---|
| Location of stadiums of the 2010 AFF Championship. Yellow: Group Stage. Red: Final. | Gelora Bung Karno Stadium | Gelora Sriwijaya Stadium | Mỹ Đình National Stadium | Thiên Trường Stadium | Bukit Jalil National Stadium |
| Location of stadiums of the 2010 AFF Championship. Yellow: Group Stage. Red: Final. | Capacity: 88,083 | Capacity: 36,000 | Capacity: 40,192 | Capacity: 20,000 | Capacity: 110,000 |

== Qualification ==
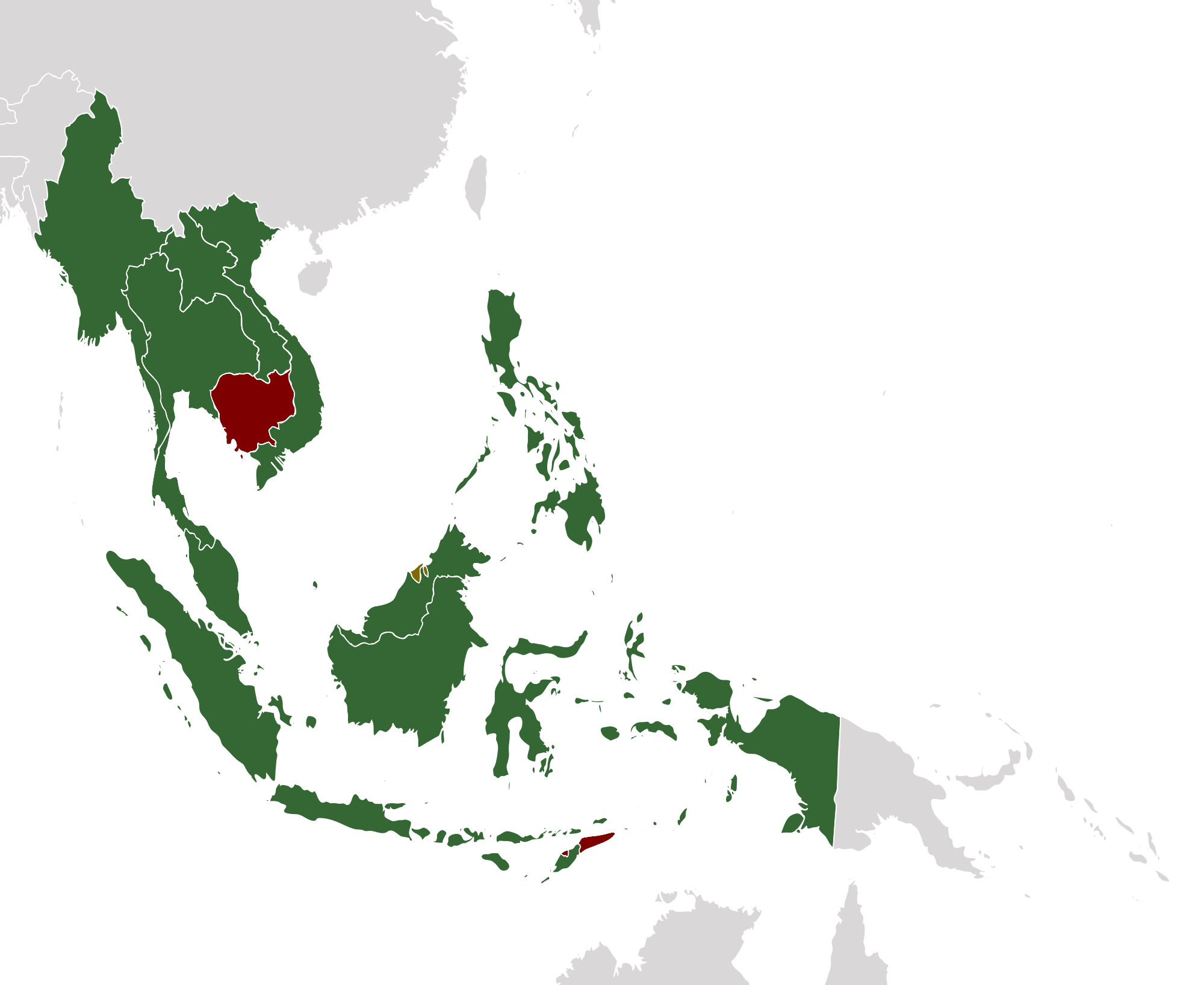
Qualified Failed to qualify Banned

Qualification took place from 22 to 26 October 2010 in Laos, with the four lower-ranked teams (Laos, Cambodia, the Philippines and Timor-Leste) battling for two spots to the finals. However, the qualification tournament was held without Brunei due to FIFA's continued suspension of the Football Federation of Brunei Darussalam.

Six teams qualified for the finals, based on tournament records:

- Indonesia
- Malaysia
- Myanmar
- Singapore
- Thailand
- Vietnam

Two teams qualified via the qualification tournament:

- Laos (Qualification winners)
- Philippines (Qualification runners-up)

=== Qualified teams ===
The following eight teams qualified for the tournament.

| Country | Previous best performance |
|---|---|
| Vietnam | Winners (2008) |
| Thailand | Winners (1996, 2000, 2002) |
| Singapore | Winners (1998, 2004, 2007) |
| Indonesia | Runners-up (2000, 2002, 2004) |
| Malaysia | Runners-up (1996) |
| Myanmar | Fourth-place (2004) |
| Laos | Group stage (1996, 1998, 2000, 2002, 2004, 2007, 2008) |
| Philippines | Group stage (1996, 1998, 2000, 2002, 2004, 2007) |

== Group stage ==
Key to colours in group tables
Top two placed teams advanced to the semi-finals

=== Group A ===
- All matches were played in Indonesia.
- Times listed are UTC+7.

| Team | Pld | W | D | L | GF | GA | GD | Pts |
|---|---|---|---|---|---|---|---|---|
| Indonesia (H) | 3 | 3 | 0 | 0 | 13 | 2 | +11 | 9 |
| Malaysia | 3 | 1 | 1 | 1 | 6 | 6 | 0 | 4 |
| Thailand | 3 | 0 | 2 | 1 | 3 | 4 | −1 | 2 |
| Laos | 3 | 0 | 1 | 2 | 3 | 13 | −10 | 1 |

1 December 2010
17:00

| Thailand | 2–2 | Laos |
|---|---|---|
| Sarayuth 67', 90+1' | Report | Konekham 54'; Kanlaya 82' |

Gelora Bung Karno Stadium, Jakarta
Referee: Ryuji Sato (Japan)
1 December 2010
19:30

| Indonesia | 5–1 | Malaysia |
|---|---|---|
| Asraruddin 22' (o.g.); Gonzáles 33'; Ridwan 52'; Arif 76'; Irfan 90+4' | Report | Norshahrul 18' |

Gelora Bung Karno Stadium, Jakarta
Attendance: 62,000
Referee: Võ Minh Trí (Vietnam)

4 December 2010
17:00

| Thailand | 0–0 | Malaysia |
|---|---|---|
| | Report |

Gelora Bung Karno Stadium, Jakarta
Referee: Win Cho (Myanmar)
4 December 2010
19:30

| Laos | 0–6 | Indonesia |
|---|---|---|
| | Report | Firman 26' (pen.), 51'; Ridwan 33'; Irfan 63'; Arif 77'; Okto 82' |

Gelora Bung Karno Stadium, Jakarta
Attendance: 70,000
Referee: Daud Abbas (Singapore)

7 December 2010
19:30

| Malaysia | 5–1 | Laos |
|---|---|---|
| Amri 4', 41'; Amirul 74'; Norshahrul 77'; Mahali 90+3' | Report | Lamnao 8' |

Gelora Sriwijaya Stadium, Palembang
Referee: Võ Minh Trí (Vietnam)
7 December 2010
19:30

| Indonesia | 2–1 | Thailand |
|---|---|---|
| Bambang 82' (pen.), 90+1' (pen.) | Report | Suree 69' |

Gelora Bung Karno Stadium, Jakarta
Attendance: 65,000
Referee: Ryuji Sato (Japan)

=== Group B ===
- All matches were played in Vietnam.
- Times listed are UTC+7

| Team | Pld | W | D | L | GF | GA | GD | Pts |
|---|---|---|---|---|---|---|---|---|
| Vietnam (H) | 3 | 2 | 0 | 1 | 8 | 3 | +5 | 6 |
| Philippines | 3 | 1 | 2 | 0 | 3 | 1 | +2 | 5 |
| Singapore | 3 | 1 | 1 | 1 | 3 | 3 | 0 | 4 |
| Myanmar | 3 | 0 | 1 | 2 | 2 | 9 | −7 | 1 |

2 December 2010
17:00

| Singapore | 1–1 | Philippines |
|---|---|---|
| Đurić 65' | Report | C. Greatwich 90+3' |

Mỹ Đình National Stadium, Hanoi
Referee: Chaiya Mahapab (Thailand)
2 December 2010
19:30

| Vietnam | 7–1 | Myanmar |
|---|---|---|
| Nguyễn Anh Đức 13', 56'; Nguyễn Minh Phương 30'; Lê Tấn Tài 51'; Nguyễn Trọng Hoàng 73', 83'; Nguyễn Vũ Phong 90+4' | Report | Aung Kyaw Moe 16' |

Mỹ Đình National Stadium, Hanoi
Attendance: 40,000
Referee: Pratap Singh (India)

5 December 2010
17:00

| Singapore | 2–1 | Myanmar |
|---|---|---|
| Đurić 62'; Casmir 90+4' | Report | Khin Maung Lwin 13' |

Mỹ Đình National Stadium, Hanoi
Referee: Tao Rancheng (China PR)
5 December 2010
19:30

| Philippines | 2–0 | Vietnam |
|---|---|---|
| C. Greatwich 38'; P. Younghusband 79' | Report |

Mỹ Đình National Stadium, Hanoi
Attendance: 40,000
Referee: Jimmy Napitupulu (Indonesia)

8 December 2010
19:30

| Myanmar | 0–0 | Philippines |
|---|---|---|
| | Report |

Thiên Trường Stadium, Nam Định
Referee: Pratap Singh (India)
8 December 2010
19:30

| Vietnam | 1–0 | Singapore |
|---|---|---|
| Nguyễn Vũ Phong 32' | Report |

Mỹ Đình National Stadium, Hanoi
Attendance: 40,000
Referee: Chaiya Mahapab (Thailand)

== Knockout stage ==
=== Bracket ===
Semi-finals
A2 | Malaysia | 2 | 0 | 2
B1 | Vietnam | 0 | 0 | 0
B2 | Philippines | 0 | 0 | 0
A1 | Indonesia | 1 | 1 | 2

Final
A2 | Malaysia | 3 | 1 | 4
A1 | Indonesia | 0 | 2 | 2

=== Semi-finals ===
First legs

15 December 2010
20:00 UTC+8

| Malaysia | 2–0 | Vietnam |
|---|---|---|
| Safee 60', 79' | Report |

Bukit Jalil National Stadium, Kuala Lumpur
Attendance: 45,000
Referee: Sun Baojie (China PR)
16 December 2010
19:00 UTC+7

| Philippines | 0–1 | Indonesia |
|---|---|---|
| | Report | Gonzáles 32' |

Gelora Bung Karno Stadium, Jakarta (Indonesia)^{†}
Attendance: 70,000
Referee: Masoud Moradi (Iran)

Second legs

18 December 2010
19:00 UTC+7

| Vietnam | 0–0 | Malaysia |
|---|---|---|
| | Report |

Mỹ Đình National Stadium, Hanoi
Attendance: 40,000
Referee: Kim Sang-Woo (Korea Republic)

Malaysia won 2–0 on aggregate.

19 December 2010
19:00 UTC+7

| Indonesia | 1–0 | Philippines |
|---|---|---|
| Gonzáles 43' | Report |

Gelora Bung Karno Stadium, Jakarta
Attendance: 88,000
Referee: Ali Abdulnabi (Bahrain)

Indonesia won 2–0 on aggregate.

^{†} The first leg of the semi-finals was supposed to be played in the Philippines. However, due to the unavailability of a stadium that passes AFF standards, both legs were hosted by Indonesia.

=== Final ===
First leg

26 December 2010
20:00 UTC+8

| Malaysia | 3–0 | Indonesia |
|---|---|---|
| Safee 61', 72'; Ashaari 68' | Report |

Bukit Jalil National Stadium, Kuala Lumpur
Attendance: 98,543
Referee: Masaaki Toma (Japan)

Second leg

29 December 2010
19:00 UTC+7

| Indonesia | 2–1 | Malaysia |
|---|---|---|
| Nasuha 72'; Ridwan 87' | Report | Safee 54' |

Gelora Bung Karno Stadium, Jakarta
Attendance: 88,000
Referee: Peter Green (Australia)

Malaysia won 4–2 on aggregate.

== Awards ==
2010 AFF Championship champion

Malaysia
First title

| Most Valuable Player | Golden Boot | Fair Play Award |
|---|---|---|
| (Indonesia) Firman Utina | (Malaysia) Safee Sali | Philippines |

== Goalscorers ==
5 goals

- (Malaysia) Safee Sali

3 goals

- (Indonesia) Cristian Gonzáles
- (Indonesia) Muhammad Ridwan

2 goals

- (Indonesia) Arif Suyono
- (Indonesia) Bambang Pamungkas
- (Indonesia) Firman Utina
- (Indonesia) Irfan Bachdim
- (Malaysia) Mohd Amri Yahyah
- (Malaysia) Norshahrul Idlan Talaha
- (Philippines) Christopher Greatwich
- (Singapore) Aleksandar Đurić
- (Thailand) Sarayuth Chaikamdee
- (Vietnam) Nguyễn Anh Đức
- (Vietnam) Nguyễn Trọng Hoàng
- (Vietnam) Nguyễn Vũ Phong

1 goal

- (Indonesia) Mohammad Nasuha
- (Indonesia) Oktovianus Maniani
- (Laos) Kanlaya Sysomvang
- (Laos) Konekham Inthammvong
- (Laos) Lamnao Singto
- (Malaysia) Mohd Amirul Hadi Zainal
- (Malaysia) Mahali Jasuli
- (Malaysia) Mohd Ashaari Shamsuddin
- (Myanmar) Aung Kyaw Moe
- (Myanmar) Khin Maung Lwin
- (Philippines) Phil Younghusband
- (Singapore) Agu Casmir
- (Thailand) Suree Sukha
- (Vietnam) Lê Tấn Tài
- (Vietnam) Nguyễn Minh Phương

Own goals

- (Malaysia) Asraruddin Putra Omar (playing against Indonesia)

== Team statistics ==
This table shows all team performance.

| Pos | Team | Pld | W | D | L | GF | GA | GD |
|---|---|---|---|---|---|---|---|---|
Final
| 1 | Malaysia | 7 | 3 | 2 | 2 | 12 | 8 | +4 |
| 2 | Indonesia | 7 | 6 | 0 | 1 | 17 | 6 | +11 |
Semi-finals
| 3 | Vietnam | 5 | 2 | 1 | 2 | 8 | 5 | +3 |
| 4 | Philippines | 5 | 1 | 2 | 2 | 3 | 3 | 0 |
Eliminated in the group stage
| 5 | Singapore | 3 | 1 | 1 | 1 | 3 | 3 | 0 |
| 6 | Thailand | 3 | 0 | 2 | 1 | 3 | 4 | −1 |
| 7 | Myanmar | 3 | 0 | 1 | 2 | 2 | 9 | −7 |
| 8 | Laos | 3 | 0 | 1 | 2 | 3 | 13 | −10 |

== Media coverage ==
2010 AFF Championship Broadcasters in Southeast Asia
| Country | Network Station | Television Station | Radio Station |
|---|---|---|---|
| Brunei | Radio Televisyen Brunei | RTB TV1 | Radio Nasional Brunei |
| Cambodia | National Radio and Television of Cambodia | National Television of Cambodia | National Radio of Cambodia |
| Indonesia | Media Nusantara Citra | RCTI | Trijaya FM |
| Laos | Lao National Radio and Television | Lao National Television | Lao National Radio |
| Malaysia | RTM | TV1 | Hot FM |
| Myanmar | Myanmar Radio and Television | Myanmar Television | Myanmar Radio |
| Philippines | ABS-CBN | Studio 23 | DZSR Sports Radio 918 |
| Singapore | Media Corporation of Singapore, SingTel | MediaCorp TV Channel 5, mio TV | 938LIVE |
| Thailand | Channel 7 (Thailand) | CH7 | NBT Network 1 Radio in Thailand |
| Timor-Leste | Radio-Televisão Timor Leste | Televisão Timor Leste | Radio Timor Leste |
| Vietnam | Vietnam Television | VTV2 | Voice of Vietnam |

== Incidents ==
During the group match between Indonesia and Malaysia at the Gelora Bung Karno Stadium, some Indonesian fans are seen pointing green laser lights towards Malaysian goalkeeper Mohd Sharbinee when Indonesia scored their fifth goal as seen here. Other incidents also occurred soon after Malaysia's semi-final home leg against Vietnam, when Vietnamese goalkeeper Bùi Tấn Trường stated that he was targeted with green laser pointers from the Malaysian fans when he prepared for goal kicks and when saving the ball, which caused him to turn his head away. During the final, Malaysia's fans again targeted the opposition players with green laser pointers. The first leg, also at the Bukit Jalil National Stadium, was stopped for eight minutes starting in the 53rd minute when the Indonesian players walked off in protest and complained to referee Masaaki Toma about the laser lights. Malaysia scored their first goal right after play was resumed. The return-leg final in Jakarta saw Indonesian fans also pointing green laser lights again towards Malaysian goalkeeper Khairul Fahmi Che Mat.
