= Phan Văn Tài Em =

Vietnamese footballer & manager

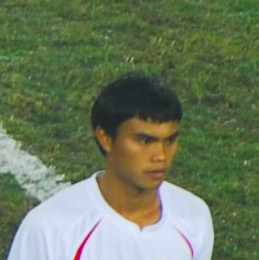

Personal information
- Full name: Phan Văn Tài Em
- Date of birth: April 23, 1982 (age 44)
- Place of birth: Châu Thành, Long An, Vietnam
- Height: 1.70 m (5 ft 7 in)
- Position: Midfielder

Youth career
- 1998–2002: Long An

Senior career*
Years	Team	Apps	(Gls)
2002–2011	Dong Tam Long An	217	(28)
2011–2012	Navibank Sai Gon	44	(5)
2012–2013	Sai Gon Xuan Thanh	27	(2)
2013–2017	Long An	88	(6)
Total		376	(40)

International career^{‡}
2003–2008	Vietnam U23	50	(5)
2002–2011	Vietnam	58	(6)

Managerial career
- 2017: Long An (assistant)
- 2018: Sai Gon
- * Club domestic league appearances and goals as of 21 June 2017 ‡ National team caps and goals as of 8 December 2015

Phan Văn Tài Em (born April 23, 1982, in Châu Thành District, Long An) is a retired Vietnamese footballer who last played as a midfielder for Dong Tam Long An. He was a member of the Vietnam national football team. He was awarded as the Vietnamese Golden Ball in 2005.

Discovered by Henrique Calisto in 2002, he, since then, became a regular starter in the national team. He has played for the U-23 Vietnam in the 2005 Southeast Asian Games and 2007 Southeast Asian Games. In 2007, he was chosen to play for the national team in the 2007 Asian Cup.

In 2008, Tài Em, along with Nguyễn Minh Phương, captained Vietnam to win the 2008 AFF Suzuki Cup.

He spent most of his career in Gach Dong Ta Long An, but he had considered a move to Navibank Sai Gon

After the retirement of Nguyễn Minh Phương, Phan Văn Tài Em was handed the captain band of the Vietnam national football team by the new coach Falko Goetz.

In September 2016 Phan Văn Tài Em announced his retirement from football.

== International goals ==
No	Date	Venue	Opponent	Score	Result	Competition
1.	1 December 2002	Colombo, Sri Lanka	Sri Lanka	1–0	2–2	Friendly
2.	21 December 2002	Jakarta, Indonesia	Indonesia	1–1	2–2	2002 AFF Championship
3.	18 February 2004	Hanoi, Vietnam	Maldives	1–0	4–0	2006 FIFA World Cup qualification
4.	18 February 2004	Hanoi, Vietnam	Maldives	3–0	4–0	2006 FIFA World Cup qualification
5.	8 September 2004	Hồ Chí Minh City, Vietnam	South Korea	1–0	1–2	2006 FIFA World Cup qualification
6.	26 November 2008	Jurong, Singapore	Singapore	2–2	2–2	Friendly
7.	4 November 2010	Hanoi, Vietnam	Singapore	1–1	1–1	Friendly

== Honours ==
=== Club ===
Long An

- V.League 1:

- Champions : 2005, 2006
- Runner-up : 2003, 2007, 2008
- Third place : 2004

- Vietnamese Super Cup:

- Champions : 2006
- Runner-up : 2005

- Vietnamese National Cup:

- Champions : 2005
- Runner-up : 2006

- V.League 2:

- Champions : 2001-2002, 2012

Xuan Thanh Sai Gon

- Vietnamese National Cup:

- Champions : 2012

Navibank Sai Gon

- Vietnamese National Cup:

- Champions : 2011

=== International ===
Vietnam U23

- Silver Southeast Asian Games : 2003, 2005

Vietnam

- Champion AFF Championship: 2008
- Third place AFF Championship : 2002

=== Individuals ===
- Vietnamese Golden Ball: 2005
- Best Young Player of Vietnam Football Federation: 2004
