= Konekham Inthammavong =

Laotian footballer

Konekham Inthammavong (born 10 July 1992), is a Laotian football player, who plays as midfielder for Lao Toyota F.C. in Lao League. He is a member of the Laos national football team who has represented the national team at 2010 AFF Suzuki Cup.
