= Bùi Tấn Trường =

Vietnamese footballer (born 1986)

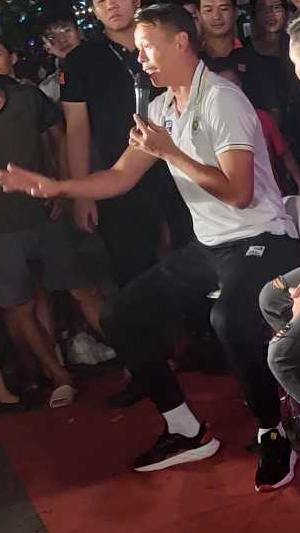

Personal information
- Full name: Bùi Tấn Trường
- Date of birth: 19 February 1986 (age 40)
- Place of birth: Lai Vung, Đồng Tháp, Vietnam
- Height: 1.88 m (6 ft 2 in)
- Position: Goalkeeper

Team information
- Current team: Đồng Nai City
- Number: 1

Youth career
- 1997–2005: Đồng Tháp

Senior career*
Years	Team	Apps	(Gls)
2006–2012	Đồng Tháp	44	(1)
2012–2013	Xuân Thành Sài Gòn	32	(0)
2013–2019	Becamex Bình Dương	95	(0)
2020–2024	Hà Nội	59	(0)
2024–	Đồng Nai City	46	(0)

International career^{‡}
2008–2010	Vietnam U23	5	(0)
2009–2022	Vietnam	19	(0)
- * Club domestic league appearances and goals as of 6 June 2026 ‡ National team caps and goals as of 1 February 2022

Bùi Tấn Trường (born 19 February 1986) is a Vietnamese professional footballer who plays as a goalkeeper for V.League 1 club Đồng Nai City.

In 2008, Bùi Tấn Trường was a member of the Vietnam under-22 squad which won the Merdeka Cup after beating hosts Malaysia in the final. Trường made his debut for the Vietnam national team in a 0–0 draw with Syria in 2009. In March 2010, he signed a record deal with his club Đồng Tháp F.C. to make him the most expensive goalkeeper of V-League.

== Club career ==
=== Đồng Tháp ===
Born in Lai Vung, Đồng Tháp, Tấn Trường joined Đồng Tháp FC's academy in 2001, progressing through the youth set up before making his senior debut in 2007. On 28 July 2007, he scored a late equalizer in a 2–2 draw to Đồng Tâm Long An.

In March 2010, Trường signed a new contract extension to stay with Đồng Tháp until the end of 2013.

=== Xuân Thành Sài Gòn ===
Trường completed his transfer to Xuân Thành Sài Gòn in October 2011.

=== Becamex Bình Dương ===
In 2013, Tấn Trường signed for Becamex Bình Dương. During his 6 years at the club, he won two V.League 1 titles, two Vietnamese Cups and two Vietnamese Super Cups.

=== Hà Nội ===
In May 2020, Hà Nội completed the signing of Tấn Trường on a free transfer. He penned a one-year contract, with the option to extend for a further year.

== Honours ==
Đồng Tháp

- Vietnamese National First Division: 2006

Xuân Thành Sài Gòn

- Vietnamese National Cup: 2012

Becamex Bình Dương

- V.League 1: 2014, 2015
- Vietnamese National Cup: 2015, 2018
- Vietnamese Super Cup: 2014, 2015
- Mekong Club Championship: 2014

Hà Nội

- V.League 1: 2022
- Vietnamese National Cup: 2020, 2022
- Vietnamese Super Cup: 2020

Trường Tươi Đồng Nai

- V.League 2: 2025–26

Vietnam U23

- SEA Games silver medal: 2009

Individual

- Vietnamese Bronze Ball : 2009
