= Iddi Batambuze =

Ugandan footballer (born 1973)

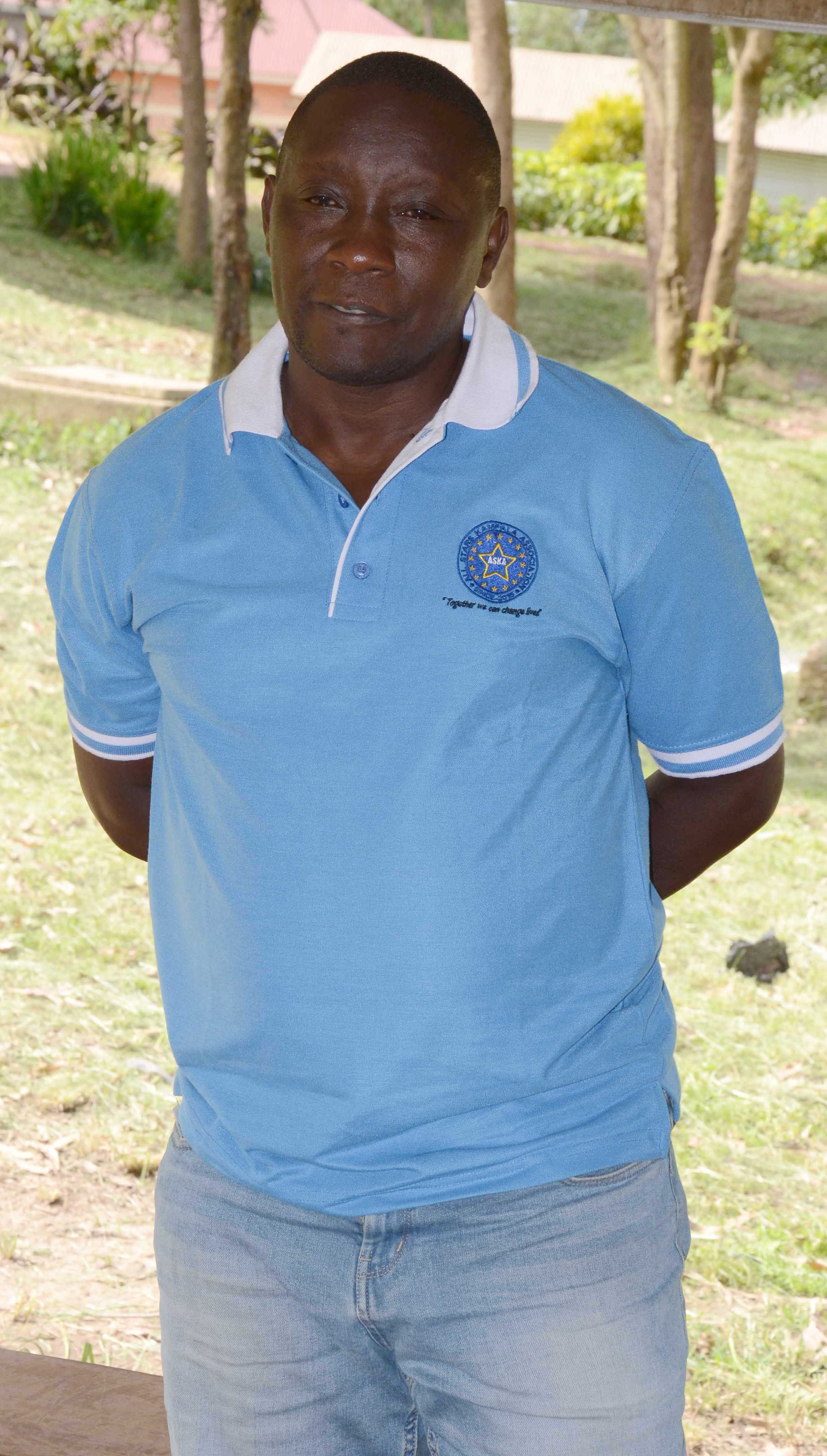

Personal information
- Date of birth: 12 November 1972 (age 53)
- Place of birth: Uganda
- Position: Midfielder

Senior career*
Years	Team	Apps	(Gls)
–1995	Villa		
1996	Umeme FC		
1997–1999	Villa		
2000–2002	Sông Lam Nghệ An		
2003	Đà Nẵng		
2004	Ggaba United		
2007	Arambagh		

International career
1993–1999	Uganda	19	(2)
- * Club domestic league appearances and goals

Iddi Batambuze (born 12 November 1972) is a Ugandan former footballer who last played as a midfielder for Arambagh.

== Early life ==
Batambuze started his career in Uganda, where he was described as "one of the midfielders to watch in his heyday... most fans will remember him for his time at Villa where he partnered the likes of Edgar Watson, James Odoch and Hakim Magumba to devastating effect".

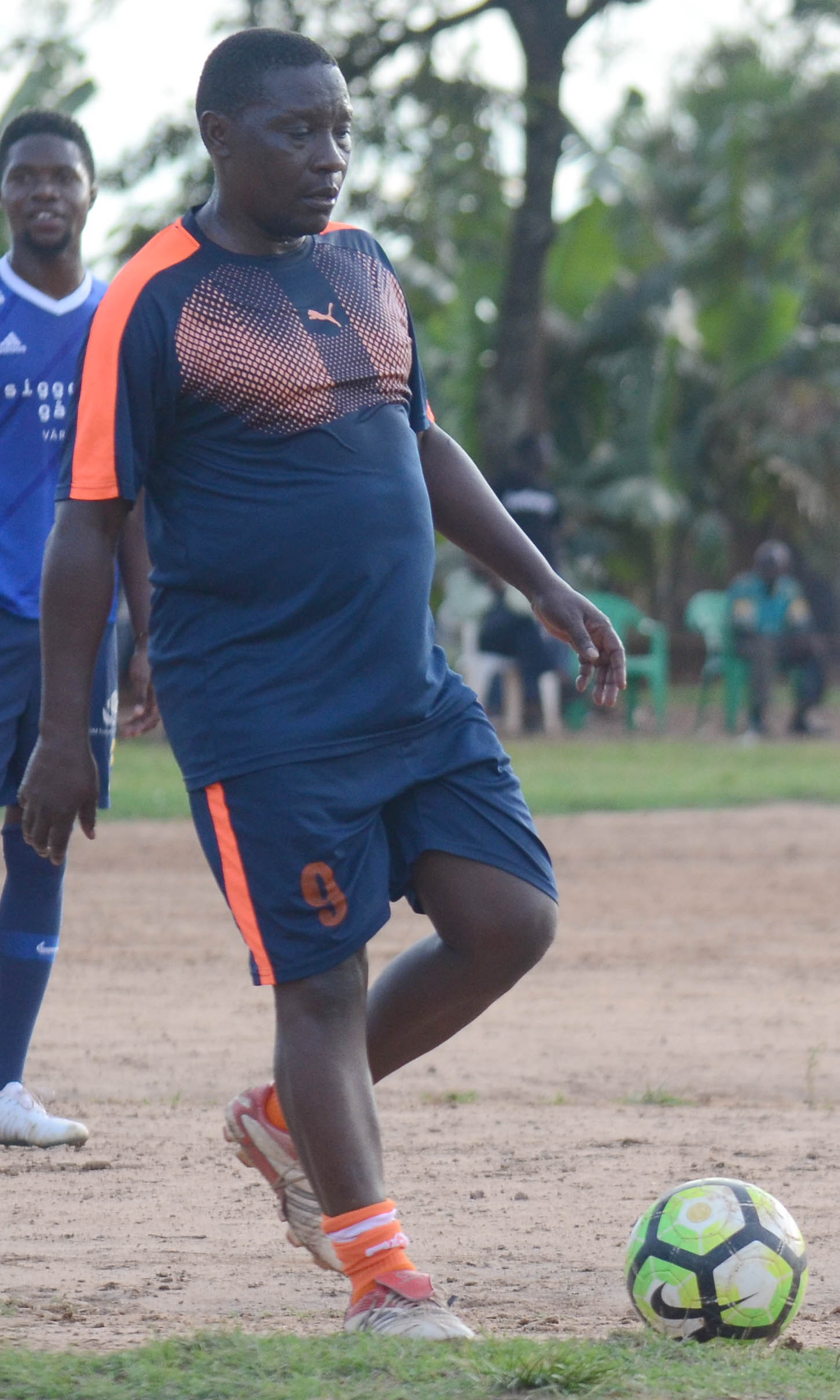
Iddi Batambuze, a former Ugandan footballer

== Club career ==
Batambuze signed for Vietnamese side SLNA, helping the club win the league. He was awarded the Best Foreign Player in Vietnam in 2000 and 2001. However, he was then described as "showing signs of indiscipline and loose living... the SLNA coaching staff often used him as examples of discipline and moderate living". This was described as the result of "consequences of "chaotic" nights at discos... drugged nights with prostitutes".

== International career ==
Batambuze first played for the Uganda national football team for the 1994 African Cup of Nations qualification.

== Style of play ==
Batambuze mainly operated as a midfielder and was known for his strength.

== Personal life ==
Batambuze learned to speak Vietnamese.
