= Võ Văn Hạnh =

Vietnamese footballer (born 1974)

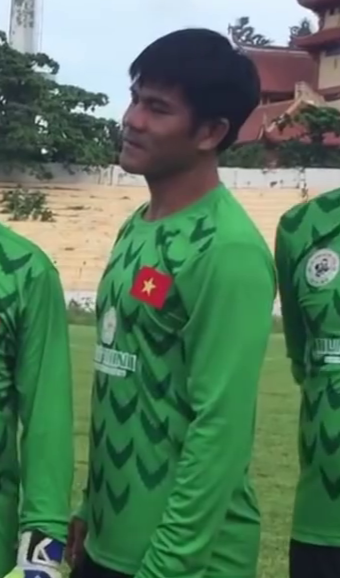
- Văn Hạnh in 2019

Personal information
- Full name: Võ Văn Hạnh
- Date of birth: April 1, 1974 (age 52)
- Place of birth: Phú Yên, South Vietnam
- Height: 1.75 m (5 ft 9 in)
- Position: Goalkeeper

Youth career
- 1986–1998: Sông Lam Nghệ An

Senior career*
Years	Team	Apps	(Gls)
1999–2002	Sông Lam Nghệ An	103	(0)
2002–2005	Hoàng Anh Gia Lai	62	(0)
2005–2010	SHB Đà Nẵng	96	(0)
Total		261	(0)

International career
2002–2009	Vietnam	2	(0)
- * Club domestic league appearances and goals

Võ Văn Hạnh (born 1 April 1974) is a retired Vietnamese footballer who played as a goalkeeper for the V-League club Đà Nẵng F.C., where he spent five years. He also represented his country twice in 2002.

In addition to being a footballer, Võ Văn Hạnh is known as a devout Buddhist and vegetarian. During his playing career, he was sometimes affectionately known as Nhà Sư or The Monk for his devotion to Buddhism. Since retiring from football, he has participated in many Buddhist public activities and has worked to promote interfaith dialog.
