= Nguyễn Văn Cường =

Vietnamese footballer (born 1966)

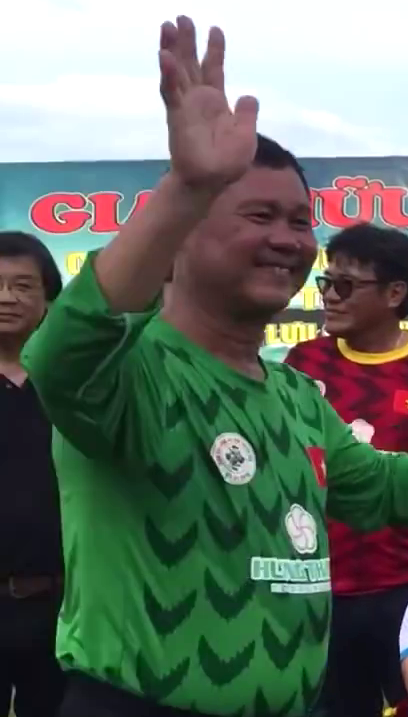
- Nguyễn in 2019

Personal information
- Date of birth: 14 June 1966 (age 60)
- Place of birth: Hải Phòng, North Vietnam
- Height: 1.74 m (5 ft 9 in)
- Position: Goalkeeper

Youth career
- 1984–1986: Công Nhân Nghĩa Bình

Senior career*
| Years | Team | Apps | (Gls) |
| 1987–2008 | Công Nhân Nghĩa Bình | 73 | (0) |

International career
| 1995–1996 | Vietnam | 3 | (0) |

Managerial career
- 2001–2012: Bình Định
- * Club domestic league appearances and goals

Nguyễn Văn Cường (born 14 June 1966) is a Vietnamese football manager and former footballer who mostly recently managed Bình Định.

== Career ==
Nguyễn spent his entire playing and managerial career with Vietnamese side Bình Định and played for the Vietnam national team.

== Honours ==
Bình Định

- Vietnamese Cup: 2003

Vietnam

- SEA Games: Silver medal: 1995
- AFF Championship third place: 1996

Individual

- Vietnamese Silver Ball: 1995
