= Lê Tấn Tài =

Vietnamese footballer (born 1984)

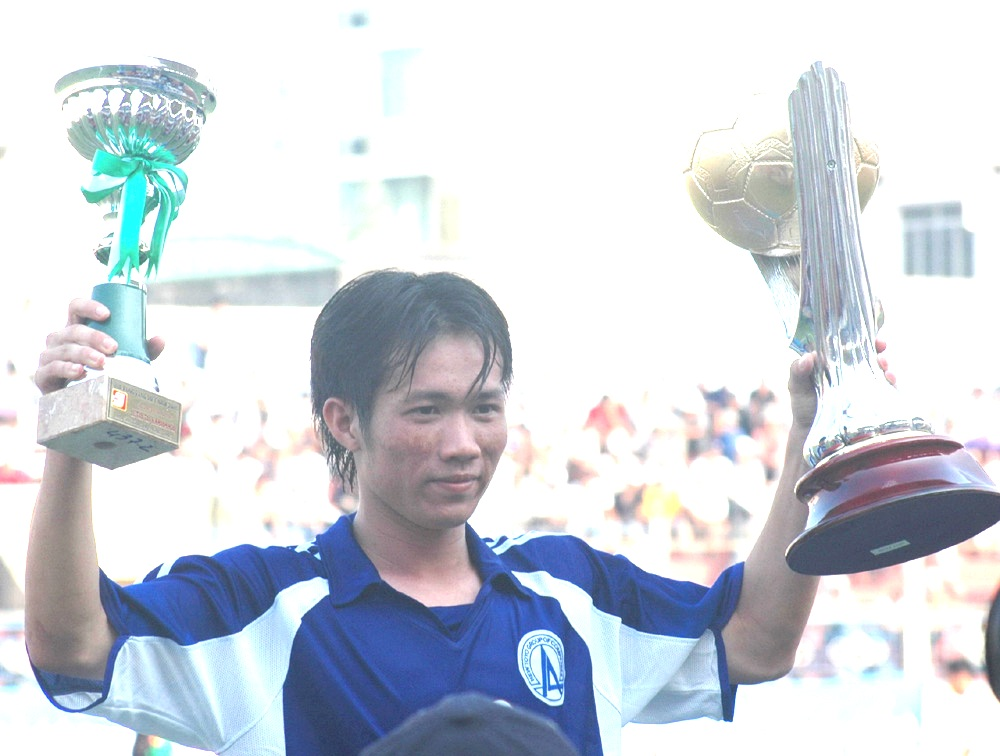
- Lê Tấn Tài receiving "2005 The Best Young Player Award" and "2005 Vietnamese Bronze Ball" in 2006

Personal information
- Date of birth: 4 January 1984 (age 42)
- Place of birth: Ninh Hòa, Khánh Hòa, Vietnam
- Height: 1.66 m (5 ft 5 in)
- Position: Central midfielder

Youth career
- 2002–2003: Khatoco Khánh Hòa

Senior career*
Years	Team	Apps	(Gls)
2003–2012	Khatoco Khánh Hòa	217	(15)
2013	Hải Phòng	11	(2)
2014–2019	Becamex Bình Dương	155	(12)
2020	Hồng Lĩnh Hà Tĩnh	6	(0)
2020–2021	Hà Nội	15	(0)
2022	Khánh Hòa	19	(0)
Total		434	(29)

International career
2005–2007	Vietnam U23	40	(3)
2006–2014	Vietnam	64	(3)
Medal record
Vietnam under-23
SEA Games
Silver medal – second place	SEA Games 2005	Football
- * Club domestic league appearances and goals

Lê Tấn Tài (born 4 January 1984) is a Vietnamese retired footballer, and was captain of the Vietnam national football team, where he played as a central midfielder. He last played for Khánh Hòa in the V.League 2.

Tấn Tài currently holds the record for the all-time most appearance in V.League 1 history with 434 appearances.

== International career ==
Tấn Tài, along with other Vietnam national team members, attended Vietnam's first AFC Asian Cup in 2007 that was hosted in Vietnam, Thailand, Indonesia, and Malaysia. In 2008, he helped Vietnam win their first ever AFF Championship trophy.

Since Henrique Calisto comes in charge of the national team, Tấn Tàiis moved to play in the more central role in the midfield. He plays as the highest midfielder in Calisto's one-striker system.

After the 2014 AFF Championship, Tấn Tài announced his retirement from international football.

=== International goals ===
Scores and results list Vietnam's goal tally first.

==== Under-23 ====
#	Date	Venue	Opponent	Score	Result	Competition
1.	22 November 2005	Bacolod, Paglaum Stadium	Laos	8–2	8–2	SEA Games 2005
2.	5 December 2006	Doha, Grand Hamad Stadium	Bangladesh	5–1	5–1	2006 Asian Games
3.	5 November 2007	Hanoi, Mỹ Đình National Stadium	Finland	1–1	1–2	2007 VFF Cup

==== Vietnam ====
#	Date	Venue	Opponent	Score	Result	Competition
1.	28 December 2006	Bangkok, Suphachalasai Stadium	Singapore	2–1	3–2	2006 King's Cup
2.	2 December 2010	Hanoi, Mỹ Đình National Stadium	Myanmar	3–1	7–1	2010 AFF Championship
3.	24 November 2012	Bangkok, Rajamangala Stadium	Myanmar	1–0	1–1	2012 AFF Championship

== Honours ==
Khatoco Khánh Hòa

- V.League 2: 2005
- Vietnamese Second Division: 2004

Becamex Bình Dương

- V.League 1: 2014, 2015
- Vietnamese National Cup: 2015, 2018
- Vietnamese Super Cup: 2014, 2015
- Mekong Club Championship: 2014

Hà Nội

- Vietnamese National Cup: 2020
- Vietnamese Super Cup: 2020

Vietnam U23

- SEA Games silver medal: 2005

Vietnam

- AFF Championship: 2008

Individual

- Vietnamese Silver Ball: 2012
- Vietnamese Bronze Ball: 2005, 2006
- Vietnamese Young Player of the Year: 2005
