= Elenildo de Jesus =

Brazilian footballer (born 1979)

Personal information
- Date of birth: September 7, 1979 (age 47)
- Place of birth: Brazil
- Height: 1.80 m (5 ft 11 in)
- Position: Forward

Senior career*
Years	Team	Apps	(Gls)
2006–2007	Saigon Port		
2008–2009	Hải Phòng		
2010–2011	Bình Dương		
2012	TPHCM		
2013	SHB Vientiane		
- * Club domestic league appearances and goals

Elenildo de Jesus (born 9 July 1979) is a Brazilian former professional footballer who played as a forward.

== Early life ==
He was born in 1979 in Brazil and grew up poor. He played street football in Brazil.

== Career ==
He started his V-League career with Vietnamese side Saigon Port. He was top scorer of the 2006 V-League with eighteen goals and was named as the best foreign player of the year. During the 2007 season, he scored fourteen league goals. Before the 2008 season, he signed for Vietnamese side Hải Phòng, where he stayed for two seasons. He has been in the all-time top ten strikers with the most goals in the V-League with sixty goals. In 2013, he signed for Laotian side SHB Vientiane.

== Style of play ==
He mainly operated as a striker and was known for his agility and speed.

== Personal life ==
After retiring from professional football, he lived with his family in Ho Chi Minh City, Vietnam.
