= Đặng Thị Kiều Trinh =

Vietnamese footballer (born 1985)

Personal information
- Date of birth: 19 December 1985 (age 40)
- Place of birth: Sa Đéc, Đồng Tháp, Vietnam
- Height: 1.67 m (5 ft 6 in)
- Position: Goalkeeper

Senior career*
Years	Team	Apps	(Gls)
2001–2021	Hồ Chí Minh City I	157	(0)

International career^{‡}
2004–2018	Vietnam	118	(0)
- * Club domestic league appearances and goals ‡ National team caps and goals as of 2018 (UTC)

Đặng Thị Kiều Trinh (born 19 December 1985) is a retired Vietnamese footballer who plays as a goalkeeper for Hồ Chí Minh City I.

== Honours ==
=== Club ===
Hồ Chí Minh City I W.F.C.

- Vietnam women's football championship:

(gold) Winners : 2004, 2005, 2010, 2015, 2016, 2017
(silver) Runners-up : 2013

=== Vietnam ===
- Southeast Asian Games:

(gold) Winners : 2009, 2015, 2017
(silver) Runners-up : 2007, 2013

- AFF Women's Championship:

(gold) Winners : 2006, 2012
(silver) Runners-up : 2008

- Asian Games

- Fourth place : 2014 Asian Games

=== Individuals ===
- Vietnamese Golden Ball : 2011, 2012, 2017
- Vietnamese Silver Ball : 2009, 2010, 2014
- Vietnamese Bronze Ball : 2016
- Best goalkeeper of Vietnam women's football championship: 2010, 2011, 2013, 2015, 2016
- AFF Player of the Year (Women's) : 2013
