= Trần Minh Quang =

Vietnamese footballer

Personal information
- Full name: Trần Minh Quang
- Date of birth: 19 April 1973 (age 53)
- Place of birth: Bình Định, South Vietnam
- Height: 1.76 m (5 ft 9 in)
- Position: Goalkeeper

Youth career
- 1988–1992: Bình Định

Senior career*
Years	Team	Apps	(Gls)
1992–2007	Bình Định	105	(0)
2008–2011	Bình Dương	32	(0)
Total		137	(0)

International career^{‡}
1997–2004	Vietnam	45	(0)
- * Club domestic league appearances and goals as of 18 September 2016 ‡ National team caps and goals as of 18 September 2021

Trần Minh Quang (born 19 April, 1973) is a former Vietnamese goalkeeper. He is currently the first coach assistant of Bình Dương .

== International statistics ==
=== Caps and goals by year ===
Year	Apps	Goals
1997	9	0
1998	0	0
1999	6	0
2000	8	0
2001	6	0
2002	8	0
2003	0	0
2004	8	0
Total	45	0

== Honours ==
=== Club ===
Bình Dương F.C.

- V-League: 2008
- Vietnamese Super Cup: 2008

=== Individual ===
Vietnamese Silver Ball: 2002
