= Marcelo Barbieri =

Brazilian footballer (born 1979)

Marcelo Barbieru Đoàn Marcelo
Personal information
- Birth name: Marcelo Barbieri
- Date of birth: 22 April 1979 (age 47)
- Place of birth: Brazil
- Height: 1.90 m (6 ft 3 in)
- Position: Defender

Senior career*
Years	Team	Apps	(Gls)
2005–2009	Hue		
2010–2013	Hoang Anh Gia Lai	56	(3)
2014	SHB Da Nang	8	(0)
- * Club domestic league appearances and goals

Marcelo Barbieri (born 22 April 1979), who also uses the Vietnamese name Đoàn Marcelo, is a Brazilian former footballer who played as a defender. He played for the Vietnamese club Hue from 2005 to 2009 before transferring to Hoang Anh Gia Lai, where he remained from 2010 to 2013. He then played a single season for SHB Da Nang.

Marcelo was born and raised in Brazil and was the eldest son in a family of four.
