= Nguyễn Minh Châu =

Nguyễn Minh Châu may refer to:

- Nguyễn Minh Châu (novelist) (1930–1989), Vietnamese novelist
- Nguyễn Minh Châu (footballer) (born 1985), Vietnamese footballer
