= Long An FC =

Vietnamese football club

- Full name: Long An Football Club
- Nickname: Trâu chiến (The War Buffalo)
- Short name: LFC
- Founded: 2000; 26 years ago
- Ground: Long An Stadium
- Capacity: 19,975
- Chairman: Võ Thành Nhiệm
- Manager: Nguyễn Ngọc Linh
- League: V.League 2
- 2025–26: V.League 2, 11th of 12
Home colours	Away colours

Long An Football Club (Vietnamese: Câu lạc bộ Bóng đá Long An), simply known as Long An, is a professional football club, based in Tân An ward, Tây Ninh, Vietnam, that competes in the V.League 2.

The team is playing at Long An Stadium. The name Long An was adopted on 12 December 2015 to replace Đồng Tâm Long An.

== History ==
Forerunner of the football club Đồng Tâm Long An is the merger of the two football teams: Team Long An and Đồng Tâm Tiles young team. From the mid-'90s, Đồng Tâm has focused on sports activities for staffs in the company, especially football. Since then young football team movement Gach Đồng Tâm was born in 1996 and developed in parallel with the general business activities of the company. In 2000, in response to the state's glue called the socialization of sports in Vietnam, and the attention and support of the Long An Province People's Committee, the company has been working and consulting with the Department of Provincial Sport Long An Province to take over the football team Long An are playing in the Championship. After receiving teams, Board staff sent abroad to visit and learn from professional football model in developing football nations like Argentina, Portugal, Italy .. selection, application and model building successful first professional football club in Vietnam. In 2001, the team switched to a professional model, is transferred to the Đồng Tâm Joint Stock Company management (from 2002, by the Đồng Tâm Co. Sports Management), merged into the team of the company, the implementation new game called football club, Đồng Tâm Long An Tiles. Vo Quoc Thang, Chairman of Đồng Tâm Joint Stock Company, interested in construction investment, the team had many outstanding progress and become one of the "big four" in the V-League with Becamex Bình Dương, SHB Đà Nẵng and Hoàng Anh Gia Lai. The club also built a reserve squad named Tile Dong Tam Long An to play in the Second Division. In late 2005, the club received the team's football club Bank of East Asia to build a second team called Son Dong Tam Long An to play in the National Football League in Vietnam 2006 . However, the end of the 2006 season, the team Son Dong Tam Long An was transferred to the limited liability company Royal Sports Development for the core football club founded Cement Vinakansai Ninh Binh. From the 2007 season, the team changed its name to football club Đồng Tâm Long An (remove letter tiles).

== Crest ==
The club's crest when Henrique Calisto was in charge resembles that of Portuguese side Boavista.

== Stadium ==
Long An Stadium is a multi-purpose stadium in Tân An, Vietnam. It is used mostly for football matches and is the home stadium of Đồng Tâm. The stadium holds 20,000 people.

== Kit suppliers and shirt sponsors ==
Period	Kit manufacturer	Shirt sponsor
2016-2019	Kappa	Cảng Long An; Dong Tam Group
2019–present		Cảng Long An; Dong Tam Group

== Record as V.League 1 member ==
Season	Pld	Won	Draw	Lost	GF	GA	GD	PTS	Final position	Notes
1998 V-League	26	5	12	9	20	29	-9	27	12th	
1999-2000 V-League	24	6	7	11	27	39	-12	25	12th	Relegation to 2000-2001 Vietnamese First Division
2003 V-League	22	11	7	4	34	17	+17	40	2nd	
2004 V-League	22	12	2	8	41	33	+8	38	3rd	
2005 V-League	22	12	6	4	43	25	+18	42	Champions	Qualified for 2006 AFC Champions League
2006 V-League	24	12	4	8	38	32	+6	40	Champions	Qualified for 2007 AFC Champions League
2007 V-League	26	12	8	6	44	29	+15	44	2nd	
2008 V-League	26	13	6	7	51	36	+15	45	2nd	
2009 V-League	26	7	13	6	43	37	+6	34	10th	
2010 V-League	26	13	4	9	43	31	+12	43	5th	
2011 V-League	26	8	6	12	31	44	−13	30	13th	Relegation to 2012 Vietnamese First Division
2013 V.League 1	20	7	1	12	31	53	−22	22	9th	
2014 V.League 1	22	5	6	11	29	45	−16	21	11th	
2017 V.League 1	26	2	4	20	30	66	−36	10	14th	Relegation to 2018 V.League 2

== Honours ==
=== Domestic competitions ===
League

- V.League 1
  - Winners (2): 2005, 2006
  - Runners-up (3): 2003, 2007, 2008
  - Third place (1): 2004
- V.League 2
  - Winners (2): 2001–02, 2012

Cup

- Vietnamese National Cup
  - Winners (1): 2005
- Vietnamese Super Cup
  - Winners (1): 2006

Other competitions

- BTV Cup
  - Winners (2): 2004, 2010
  - Runners-up (5): 2003, 2005, 2007, 2009, 2014

== Performance in AFC competitions ==
- AFC Champions League: 2 appearances

2006: Group stage
2007: Group stage

Season	Competition	Round	Club	Home	Away	Aggregate
2006	AFC Champions League	Group G	(China) Shanghai Shenhua	2–4	1–3	2nd
2007	AFC Champions League	Group G	(South Korea) Seongnam Ilhwa Chunma	1–2	1–4	4th
2007	AFC Champions League	Group G	(Australia) Adelaide United	0–2	0–3	4th
2007	AFC Champions League	Group G	(China) Shandong Luneng Taishan	2–3	0–4	4th

== Current squad ==
As of 7 September 2026

Note: Flags indicate national team as defined under FIFA eligibility rules; some limited exceptions apply. Players may hold more than one non-FIFA nationality.

No.	Pos.	Nation	Player
1	GK	VIE	Trần Tấn Lộc
2	DF	VIE	Trần Hoàng Bảo
3	DF	VIE	Trần Đàm Phúc Thịnh
4	DF	VIE	Trần Phạm Bảo Tuấn
5	DF	VIE	Mai Trần Nhật Minh (on loan from PVF)
6	DF	VIE	Nguyễn Công Tiến
8	MF	VIE	Võ Hoàng Uy
9	MF	VIE	Đỗ Tấn Thành
10	FW	VIE	Hà Vũ Em
11	FW	VIE	Cù Nguyễn Khánh
12	MF	VIE	Hoàng Minh Tâm
14	DF	VIE	Nguyễn Chính Tính
15	DF	VIE	Tiêu Ê Xal

No.	Pos.	Nation	Player
16	MF	VIE	Quách Công Đình
17	DF	VIE	Lê Nguyễn Quốc Trung
24	MF	VIE	Nguyễn Tài Lộc
26	MF	VIE	Nguyễn Công Tuyển
27	DF	VIE	Trần Văn Anh Vũ
28	FW	VIE	Trần Minh Hiếu
30	MF	VIE	Nguyễn Lộc
35	GK	VIE	Nguyễn Hoàng Minh Duy
59	DF	VIE	Nguyễn Thành Tài
62	FW	BRA	Romário Alves
67	GK	VIE	Nguyễn Mạnh Cường
80	FW	VIE	Nguyễn Kim Nhật
81	MF	VIE	Lê Hữu Phước

=== Other players under contract ===
Note: Flags indicate national team as defined under FIFA eligibility rules; some limited exceptions apply. Players may hold more than one non-FIFA nationality.

No.	Pos.	Nation	Player
7	MF	VIE	Nguyễn Thanh Hải
22	DF	VIE	Bùi Xuân Quý
47	GK	VIE	Trần An Đạt

== Current coaching staff ==
Position	Name
Head coach	(Vietnam) Nguyễn Ngọc Linh
Technical director	(Vietnam) Nguyễn Văn Sỹ
Assistant coach	(Vietnam) Hoàng Danh Ngọc (Vietnam) Hoàng Nhật Nam (Vietnam) Phan Thanh Giang (Vietnam) Phan Văn Giàu
General manager	(Vietnam) Phan Văn Tài Em
Assistant manager	(Vietnam) Trần Minh Nguyên
Doctor	(Vietnam) Phạm Tấn Lợi

== Managerial history ==
Head coaches by years (2001–present)

Name	Nat	Period	Honours
Huỳnh Ngọc San	(Vietnam)	2001–2006	2001–02 Vietnamese First Division; 2005 V-League; 2005 Vietnamese Cup
Henrique Calisto	(Portugal)	2006–2008	2006 V-League; 2006 Vietnamese Super Cup
Ednaldo de Melo Patricio	(Brazil)	2008	
Stefan Hansson	(Sweden)	2008	
Trần Công Minh	(Vietnam)	2008–2009	
José Luís	(Portugal)	2009–2010	
Trần Công Minh	(Vietnam)	2010	
Ricardo Formosinho	(Portugal)	2010	
Marcelo Javier Zuleta	(Argentina)	2010–2011	
Marco Cerqueira	(Brazil)	2011	
Simon McMenemy	(England)	2011	
Ranko Buketa	(Croatia)	2011–2012	
Trần Công Minh	(Vietnam)	2012	
Francisco Vital	(Portugal)	2012–2013	2012 Vietnamese First Division
Marcelo Javier Zuleta	(Argentina)	2013	
Ngô Quang Sang	(Vietnam)	2013–2017	
Nguyễn Minh Phương	(Vietnam)	2017–2018	
Phan Văn Giàu	(Vietnam)	2018–2019	
Ngô Quang Sang	(Vietnam)	2019–2022	
Nguyễn Anh Đức	(Vietnam)	2023	
Ngô Quang Sang	(Vietnam)	2023–2024	
Trịnh Duy Quang	(Vietnam)	2024–2025	
Nguyễn Ngọc Linh	(Vietnam)	2025–present	
