= Shamo Abbey =

Ghanaian footballer (born 1980)

Personal information
- Full name: Ebenezer Shamo Abbey
- Date of birth: 28 April 1980 (age 46)
- Place of birth: Accra, Ghana
- Height: 1.82 m (6 ft 0 in)
- Position: Forward

Youth career
- 1995–1997: Real Tamale United

Senior career*
Years	Team	Apps	(Gls)
1998	Real Tamale United	30	(19)
1999	Okwahu United	11	(3)
1999	FC St. Pauli	10	(0)
2000	Asante Kotoko	12	(1)
2000–2002	Stade Malien	24	(7)
2003	Dong A Bank	20	(3)
2004	Song Lam Nghe An	8	(0)
2005–2006	Bình Dương	25	(4)
2007	Song Lam Nghe An	20	(9)
2007	Khatoco Khánh Hoà	16	(2)
2008	Hearts of Oak	11	(1)
2009	Viettel FC	14	(5)
2009–2010	Bình Dương	21	(8)
- * Club domestic league appearances and goals

Ebenezer Shamo Abbey (born 28 April 1980) is a Ghanaian former professional footballer who played as a forward.

== Career ==
Abbey was born in Accra. He played in Ghana for Real Tamale United, Okwahu United, Asante Kotoko, in Germany FC St. Pauli and in Mali for Stade Malien. In Vietnam for Dong A Bank, Song Lam Nghe An, Bình Dương, Khatoco Khánh Hoà and Viettel FC.
