= Đào Thị Miện =

Vietnamese footballer

Personal information
- Date of birth: 17 July 1981 (age 45)
- Place of birth: Ninh Giang, Hải Dương, Vietnam
- Height: 1.60 m (5 ft 3 in)
- Position: Defender

Senior career*
Years	Team	Apps	(Gls)
1998–1999	Hà Tây	22	(6)
2000–2014	Hà Nội I	142	(49)

International career^{‡}
1998–2010	Vietnam	82	(27)
- * Club domestic league appearances and goals ‡ National team caps and goals as of 23 May 2010.

Đào Thị Miện (born 17 July 1981) is a Vietnamese retired footballer who played as a defender. She has been a member of the Vietnam women's national team.

== International career ==
Miện capped for Vietnam during two AFC Women's Asian Cup editions (2008 and 2010).

== International goals ==
No.	Date	Venue	Opponent	Score	Result	Competition
1.	15 September 2007	Thuwunna Stadium, Yangon, Myanmar	Malaysia	4–0	6–0	2007 AFF Women's Championship
