= Nguyễn Hoàng Đức =

Vietnamese professional sport player

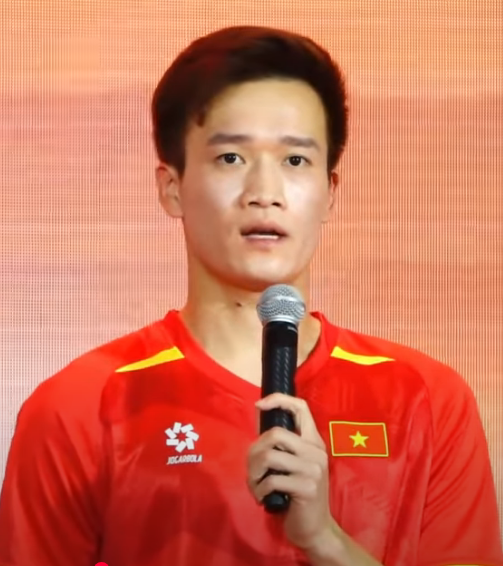
- Hoàng Đức in 2025

Personal information
- Full name: Nguyễn Hoàng Đức
- Date of birth: 11 January 1998 (age 28)
- Place of birth: Cẩm Giàng, Hải Dương, Vietnam
- Height: 1.84 m (6 ft 0 in)
- Position: Midfielder

Team information
- Current team: Ninh Bình
- Number: 28

Youth career
- 2008–2016: Viettel

Senior career*
Years	Team	Apps	(Gls)
2015	Viettel B	5	(2)
2016–2024	Thể Công-Viettel	152	(26)
2024–	Ninh Bình	46	(12)

International career^{‡}
2016–2017	Vietnam U19	17	(8)
2017–2018	Vietnam U20	8	(0)
2019–2022	Vietnam U23	12	(2)
2019–	Vietnam	68	(3)
Medal record
Men's football
Representing Vietnam
ASEAN Championship
Runner-up	ASEAN 2022	Team
Winner	ASEAN 2024	Team
SEA Games
Gold medal – first place	Manila 2019	Team
Gold medal – first place	Hanoi 2021	Team
- * Club domestic league appearances and goals as of 8 November 2026 ‡ National team caps and goals as of 5 October 2026

Nguyễn Hoàng Đức (born 11 January 1998) is a Vietnamese professional footballer who plays as a midfielder for V.League 1 club Ninh Bình and the Vietnam national team.

== Early career ==
Hoàng Đức started playing football from the second grade for his school team. In 2008, a manager of the Viettel FC football academy in Hải Dương discovered him during a youth tournament and signed him to the academy. He integrated without much difficulties into the team and was formed to become a forward. Throughout the years in the academy, he was highly appreciated by the managers for his outstanding playing technique and his will to strive for excellence. He was regularly assigned by the managers to be the team captain during youth tournaments.

In 2016, Hoàng Đức lead Viettel to the Vietnamese National U-19 Championship final before they lost against Hanoi FC in the final and was named as the "Player of the tournament".

== Club career ==
=== Viettel ===
In 2017, he was promoted to the first team squad, playing in the V.League 2. With his impressive height, his unique skillful left-foot and his high workrate in the field, coach Nguyễn Hải Biên repositioned Hoàng Đức to play in different midfield positions.

In 2018, Hoàng Đức started 17 of the 18 games in various positions, scoring 9 goals and providing 3 assists to help Viettel win the 2018 V.League 2, thus promoting to the V.League 1 in 2019. He was also voted the player of the season.

In 2020, Hoàng Đức was part of the Viettel squad that win the 2020 V.League 1, being a crucial starter. Later, he and Viettel failed to win the 2020 National Super Cup, after losing to Hanoi FC with a score of 0-1. In the 2021 AFC Champions League, he played all 6 games and scored 1 goal as Viettel failed to advance to the next stage.

In the 2023 V.League 1 season, as the key playmaker of Viettel, Hoàng Đức scored 5 goals and had 5 assists, helping Viettel finish third in the league. Therefore he was named as the league's Player of the Season.

=== Ninh Bình ===
On 8 October 2024, with only 3 months in contract left with Thể Công-Viettel, Hoàng Đức was transferred to V.League 2 side Phù Đổng Ninh Bình.

== International career ==
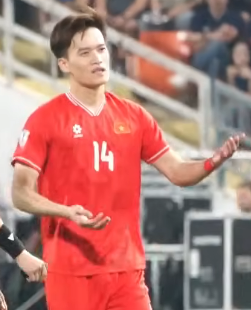
Hoàng Đức playing in the 2024 ASEAN Championship final.

In 2017, Hoàng Đức was called up to the Vietnam U-20 team to participate in the 2017 FIFA U-20 World Cup. He missed an open goal chance in the opening game against New Zealand which ended in a goalless draw. Vietnam later lost in the remaining matches and was eliminated from the group stage.

On 14 September 2019, he made his debut for Vietnam national team in the 2022 FIFA World Cup qualification game against the United Arab Emirates, coming in as a substitute in the 81th minute. Later, when Vietnam reached the third round of the qualifiers, he established himself as an important starter in the team with his impressive capacities in both defending and attacking.

On 12 December 2021, Hoàng Đức scored first goal for Vietnam in the 3–0 win against Malaysia as part of the 2020 AFF Championship.

In 2022, Hoàng Đức had won his first Vietnamese Golden Ball.

In 2024, he was named in Vietnam's 26-men squad for the 2023 AFC Asian Cup but was later removed from the squad to fully recover from his ankle injury.

== Career statistics ==
=== Club ===
As of match played 8 November 2026

Appearances and goals by club, season and competition
Club	Season	League			National cup		Continental		Other		Total	
Club	Season	Division	Apps	Goals	Apps	Goals	Apps	Goals	Apps	Goals	Apps	Goals
Viettel B	2015	Third Division	5	2	—		—		1 (Note: Appearance in Second Division promotion play-off)	0	6	2
Thể Công-Viettel	2016	V.League 2	4	0	0	0	—		—		4	0
Thể Công-Viettel	2017	V.League 2	8	0	2	1	—		—		10	1
Thể Công-Viettel	2018	V.League 2	17	9	1	0	—		—		18	9
Thể Công-Viettel	2019	V.League 1	23	1	1	0	—		—		24	1
Thể Công-Viettel	2020	V.League 1	17	2	5	0	—		—		22	2
Thể Công-Viettel	2021	V.League 1	12	1	—		6 (Note: Appearances in the AFC Champions League)	1	1 (Note: Appearances in the Vietnamese Super Cup)	0	19	2
Thể Công-Viettel	2022	V.League 1	23	6	2	0	4 (Note: Appearances in the AFC Cup)	0	—		29	6
Thể Công-Viettel	2023	V.League 1	20	5	5	1	—		—		25	6
Thể Công-Viettel	2023–24	V.League 1	24	2	3	0	—		—		27	2
Thể Công-Viettel	2024–25	V.League 1	4	0	0	0	—		—		4	0
Thể Công-Viettel	Total		152	26	19	2	10	1	1	0	182	29
Ninh Bình	2024–25	V.League 2	18	3	1	1	—		—		19	4
Ninh Bình	2025–26	V.League 1	23	7	5	2	—		—		28	9
Ninh Bình	2026–27	V.League 1	5	2	0	0	—		—		5	2
Ninh Bình	Total		46	12	6	3	0	0	0	0	52	15
Total career			203	40	25	5	10	1	2	0	240	46

=== International ===
As of 2 October 2026

Vietnam
Year	Apps	Goals
2019	1	0
2021	16	1
2022	6	1
2023	10	0
2024	13	0
2025	8	0
2026	13	1
Total	67	3

== International goals ==
=== U-23 ===
Scores and results list Vietnam's goal tally first. Only results against national teams were counted

#	Date	Venue	Opponent	Score	Result	Competition
1	26 March 2019	Mỹ Đình National Stadium, Hanoi, Vietnam	Thailand	2–0	4–0	2020 AFC U-23 Championship qualification
2	1 December 2019	Rizal Memorial Stadium, Manila, Philippines	Indonesia	2–1	2–1	2019 Southeast Asian Games

=== Vietnam ===
Scores and results list Vietnam's goal tally first. Only results against national teams were counted

#	Date	Venue	Opponent	Score	Result	Competition
1.	12 December 2021	Bishan Stadium, Bishan, Singapore	Malaysia	3–0	3–0	2020 AFF Championship
2.	27 December 2022	Mỹ Đình National Stadium, Hanoi, Vietnam	Malaysia	3–0	3–0	2022 AFF Championship
3.	2 October 2026	Gelora Bung Karno Stadium, Jakarta, Indonesia	Pakistan	2–1	4–2	2026 FIFA ASEAN Cup

== Honours ==
Viettel

- V.League 1: 2020
- V.League 2: 2018
- Vietnamese National Cup runners-up: 2020, 2023
- Vietnamese Super Cup runners-up: 2020

Ninh Bình

- V.League 2: 2024–25
- Vietnamese National Cup runners-up: 2025–26

Vietnam U23/Olympic

- SEA Games gold medal: 2019, 2021

Vietnam

- ASEAN Championship: 2024, 2026; runner-up: 2022
- VFF Cup: 2022

ASEAN All-Stars

- Maybank Challenge Cup: 2025

Individual

- Vietnamese Golden Ball: 2021, 2023, 2025
- Vietnamese Bronze Ball: 2022
- AFF Championship All-Star XI: 2022
- V.League 1 Player of the Season: 2023
- V.League 1 Team of the Season: 2023, 2025–26
- V.League 2 Team of the Season: 2024–25
- V.League 2 Player of the Season: 2024–25

Orders

- Third-class Labor Order: 2025
