= Phạm Thành Lương =

Vietnamese footballer

Personal information
- Full name: Phạm Thành Lương
- Date of birth: 10 September 1988 (age 38)
- Place of birth: Ứng Hòa, Hanoi, Vietnam
- Height: 1.66 m (5 ft 5 in)
- Positions: Left winger; attacking midfielder

Team information
- Current team: Công an Hà Nội (Assistant coach)

Youth career
- 2003: Hà Tây
- 2004–2005: Hà Nội ACB

Senior career*
Years	Team	Apps	(Gls)
2006–2012	Hà Nội ACB	144	(10)
2013–2023	Hà Nội	186	(13)
Total		330	(23)

International career
2005–2008	Vietnam U20	20	(1)
2009–2011	Vietnam U23	26	(6)
2008–2016	Vietnam	78	(7)

Managerial career
- 2023–2024: Hòa Bình
- 2024–: Công An Hà Nội (assistant)
- 2024–: Vietnam (assistant)
Medal record
Men's football
Representing Vietnam
AFF Championship
Winner	2008 AFF Championship	Team
SEA Games
Silver medal – second place	SEA Games 2009	Football
- * Club domestic league appearances and goals

Phạm Thành Lương (born 10 September 1988) is a Vietnamese football manager and former player who is the assistant coach of V.League 1 club Công An Hà Nội.

Thành Lương played as a left winger. After emerging through ACB Hanoi's youth academy and spending seven seasons with the senior side, he moved to Hanoi T&T in December 2012. Since then, he went on to become a mainstay for Hanoi FC, and had won 12 major honours, including five V.League 1 titles, three Vietnamese Cups and four Vietnamese Super Cups. At international level, Thành Lương won 78 caps for Vietnam, and was a part of the squad which won 2008 AFF Championship. He retired in 2023, at age 35.

Thành Lương began his managerial career in 2023, when he was appointed by Hòa Bình.

== Playing career ==
=== Club ===
Phạm Thành Lương was born in Ung Hoa district, Ha Tay Province (now in Hanoi). He trained at Ha Tay Football Club before joining ACB Hanoi Young Club. In 2005, he led his club to the finals of the National U-21 Football Championship. Later on, Thành Lương was chosen to play for the first team of Hà Nội ACB.

In 2008, he was assigned to move to Thể Công but it was rejected. Later that year, he won the Young Player of the Year award, Young Player of Asia in 2009.

After Hà Nội F.C. folded in 2012, he moved to rival Hà Nội T&T.

=== International ===
Thành Lương was the member of the squad that won the 2008 AFF Suzuki Cup. On December 8, 2008, he scored his first goal for the national team against Malaysia national football team in the tournament. Two days later, he scored a goal against Laos in the 4–0 win. He captained the U-23 Vietnam to win the silver medal at the 2009 Southeast Asian Games. His performance in the tournament was seen by the Vietnamese press and he was awarded the Vietnamese Golden Ball. Thành Lương announced his retirement from Vietnam National team after being eliminated by Indonesia in the 2nd leg of AFF Suzuki Cup 2016 Semi Final.

== Managerial career ==
On 8 September 2023, Thành Lương was appointed manager of V.League 2 club Hòa Bình at the age of 35. In March 2024, he left Hòa Bình to become assistant manager to Kiatisuk Senamuang at Công An Hà Nội.

== Career statistics ==
=== International goals ===
==== Under-19 ====
#	Date	Venue	Opponent	Score	Result	Competition
1.	25 November 2005	Ho Chi Minh City, Thanh Long Stadium	Maldives	4–1	4–1	2006 AFC Youth Championship qualification

==== Under-23 ====
#	Date	Venue	Opponent	Score	Result	Competition
1.	7 November 2009	Hanoi, Mỹ Đình National Stadium	China	2–0	3–1	2009 VFF Cup
2.	11 December 2009	Vientiane, Laos National Stadium	Cambodia	1–0	6–1	SEA Games 2009
3.	11 December 2009	Vientiane, Laos National Stadium	Cambodia	3–0	6–1	SEA Games 2009
4.	19 October 2011	Hanoi, Mỹ Đình National Stadium	Myanmar	4–0	5–0	2011 VFF Cup
5.	19 October 2011	Hanoi, Mỹ Đình National Stadium	Myanmar	5–0	5–0	2011 VFF Cup
6.	12 November 2011	Jakarta, Lebak Bulus Stadium	Brunei	4–0	8–0	SEA Games 2011

==== Vietnam ====
#	Date	Venue	Opponent	Score	Result	Competition
1.	8 December 2008	Phuket, Surakul Stadium	Malaysia	1–0	3–2	2008 AFF Suzuki Cup
2.	10 December 2008	Phuket, Surakul Stadium	Laos	2–0	4–0	2008 AFF Suzuki Cup
3.	6 January 2010	Saida, Saida Municipal Stadium	Lebanon	1–1	1–1	2011 AFC Asian Cup qualification
4.	29 June 2011	Ho Chi Minh City, Thống Nhất Stadium	Macau	4–0	6–0	2014 FIFA World Cup qualification
5.	23 June 2012	Ho Chi Minh City, Thống Nhất Stadium	Mozambique	1–0	1–0	Friendly
6.	28 November 2014	Hanoi, Mỹ Đình National Stadium	Philippines	3–0	3–1	2014 AFF Championship
7.	6 October 2016	Ho Chi Minh City, Thống Nhất Stadium	North Korea	5–2	5–2	Friendly

=== Managerial ===
Managerial record by team and tenure
Team	From	To	Record							
Team	From	To	Games managed	Games won	Games drawn	Games lost	Goals for	Goals against	Goal difference	Win %
Hoa Binh FC	8 September 2023	12 March 2024	12	2	5	5	8	16	−8	16.67
Total			12	2	5	5	8	16	−8	16.67

== Honours ==
Hanoi ACB

- V.League 2: 2010; Runners-up: 2009
- Vietnamese National Cup: 2006, 2008
- Vietnamese Super Cup runner-up: 2008

Hanoi T&T/Hanoi FC

- V.League 1: 2013, 2016, 2018, 2019, 2022; Runners-up : 2014, 2015, 2020
- Vietnamese National Cup: 2019, 2020, 2022; Runner-up: 2015, 2016
- Vietnamese Super Cup: 2019, 2020, 2021; Runners-up: 2014, 2016, 2017

Vietnam U23

- Southeast Asian Games: Runners-up 2009
- VFF Cup: 2009; Runners-up 2011

Vietnam

- AFF Championship: 2008
- VFF Cup: Runners-up 2008

Individual

- AFF Championship Best XI: 2014
- Vietnamese Golden Ball: 2009, 2011, 2014, 2016
- Vietnamese Silver Ball: 2010
- Best Young Player of Vietnam Football Federation: 2010, 2011
- Best player of the Vietnamese U21 National Championship: 2005
- Team of the tournament (Best XI) ASEAN Football Championship: 2014
