= Võ Hoàng Bửu =

Vietnamese football manager

Personal information
- Full name: Võ Hoàng Bửu
- Date of birth: 10 July 1968 (age 58)
- Place of birth: Saigon, South Vietnam
- Height: 1.71 m (5 ft 7 in)
- Position: Defensive midfielder

Youth career
- 1975–1983: Saigon Port

Senior career*
Years	Team	Apps	(Gls)
1988–2005	Saigon Port	108	(49)

International career
1993–2000	Vietnam	42	(9)
- * Club domestic league appearances and goals

Võ Hoàng Bửu (born 10 July 1968) is a Vietnamese football manager and former defensive midfielder who is last known to have coached Saigon Port FC. Known for his stamina and penalty-taking ability, Bửu played for and served as vice-captain of the Vietnamese national team between 1993 and 2000.

After impressing at the 1996 AFF Championship, also known as the Tiger Cup, Bửu won the Vietnamese Golden Ball in 1996.
