= Nguyễn Minh Phương =

Vietnamese footballer and manager

Personal information
- Full name: Nguyễn Minh Phương
- Date of birth: 5 July 1980 (age 46)
- Place of birth: Chơn Thành, Bình Phước, Vietnam
- Height: 1.70 m (5 ft 7 in)
- Position: Midfielder

Youth career
- 1987–1989: Cảng Sài Gòn

Senior career*
| Years | Team | Apps | (Gls) |
| 1998–2003 | Cảng Sài Gòn | 95 | (16) |
| 2003–2010 | Đồng Tâm Long An | 175 | (39) |
| 2010–2015 | SHB Đà Nẵng | 62 | (38) |
| Total | | 332 | (77) |

International career
| 1996–2006 | Vietnam U23 | 38 | (8) |
| 2002–2016 | Vietnam | 73 | (11) |

Managerial career
- 2017–2018: Long An
- 2018–2019: SHB Đà Nẵng
- 2019–2020: Bình Phước
- 2020–2021: TP. HCM (Assistant)
- 2022–: Bà Rịa Vũng Tàu
- * Club domestic league appearances and goals

Nguyễn Minh Phương (born 5 July 1980) is a Vietnamese former professional footballer who last played for SHB Đà Nẵng in the V-League. He was also the captain of the Vietnam national football team until the 2010 AFF Suzuki Cup. In 2007, he captained the Vietnamese team to the 2007 AFC Asian Cup, ending their run in the tournament in the quarter-finals.

An engine in central midfield for both club and country, Minh Phương is known for his technical passing, kick-off taking and shows versatility by often playing as a fullback, midfielder or even as a forward. In 2010, Phương became the most-capped Vietnamese footballer in the history of the national team with 73 caps, large beating Lê Huỳnh Đức, who has 66 caps. After the 2010 AFF Suzuki Cup, he retired from international football after spending 8 years in the national team.

== Career statistics ==
=== International ===
Appearances and goals by national team and year
| National team | Year | Apps | Goals |
|---|---|---|---|
| Vietnam | 2002 | 6 | 3 |
| Vietnam | 2003 | 5 | 1 |
| Vietnam | 2004 | 12 | 2 |
| Vietnam | 2005 | – | |
| Vietnam | 2006 | 3 | 0 |
| Vietnam | 2007 | 12 | 0 |
| Vietnam | 2008 | 10 | 2 |
| Vietnam | 2009 | 5 | 1 |
| Vietnam | 2010 | 12 | 2 |
| Total | | 65 | 11 |

Scores and results list Vietnam's goal tally first, score column indicates score after each Minh Phương goal.

List of international goals scored by Nguyễn Minh Phương
| No. | Date | Venue | Opponent | Score | Result | Competition |
|---|---|---|---|---|---|---|
| 1 | 27 November 2002 | Sugathadasa Stadium, Colombo, Sri Lanka | Sri Lanka | 1–0 | 2–1 | Friendly |
| 2 | 15 December 2002 | Gelora Bung Karno Stadium, Jakarta, Indonesia | Cambodia | 6–2 | 9–2 | 2002 AFF Championship |
| 3 | 29 December 2002 | Gelora Bung Karno Stadium, Jakarta, Indonesia | Malaysia | 2–1 | 2–1 | 2002 AFF Championship |
| 4 | 21 October 2003 | Sultan Qaboos Sports Complex, Muscat, Oman | Nepal | 1–0 | 2–0 | 2004 AFC Asian Cup qualification |
| 5 | 20 August 2004 | Thống Nhất Stadium, Ho Chi Minh City, Vietnam | Myanmar | 4–0 | 5–0 | 2004 LG Cup |
| 6 | 15 December 2004 | Mỹ Đình National Stadium, Hanoi, Vietnam | Laos | 2–0 | 3–0 | 2004 AFF Championship |
| 7 | 5 October 2008 | Thống Nhất Stadium, Ho Chi Minh City, Vietnam | Turkmenistan | 2–3 | 2–3 | 2008 Ho Chi Minh City Cup |
| 8 | 16 November 2008 | Mỹ Đình National Stadium, Hanoi, Vietnam | Thailand | 2–2 | 2–2 | 2008 T&T Cup |
| 9 | 14 January 2009 | Mỹ Đình National Stadium, Hanoi, Vietnam | Lebanon | 1–0 | 3–1 | 2011 AFC Asian Cup qualification |
| 10 | 12 October 2010 | Jaber Al-Ahmad International Stadium, Kuwait City, Kuwait | Kuwait | 1–0 | 1–3 | Friendly |
| 11 | 2 December 2010 | Mỹ Đình National Stadium, Hanoi, Vietnam | Myanmar | 2–1 | 7–1 | 2010 AFF Championship |

== Honors ==
=== Domestic ===
- Cảng Sài Gòn:

V-League: 2002

- Đồng Tâm Long An:

V-League: 2005, 2006
Vietnamese Cup: 2005

- SHB Đà Nẵng:

V-League: 2012

=== International ===
- Vietnam:

ASEAN Football Championship: 2008

=== Individual ===
- Vietnamese Golden Ball: 2010
