= Nguyễn Hữu Thắng (footballer, born 1980) =

Vietnamese footballer

Personal information
- Full name: Nguyễn Hữu Thắng
- Date of birth: 22 June 1980 (age 46)
- Place of birth: Dĩ An, Bình Dương, Vietnam
- Height: 1.82 m (6 ft 0 in)
- Position: Midfielder

Youth career
- 1996–2003: TDC Bình Dương

Senior career*
| Years | Team | Apps | (Gls) |
| 2004–2007 | TDC Bình Dương | 42 | (5) |
| 2008 | Vissai Ninh Bình | 19 | (1) |
| 2009–2015 | Becamex Bình Dương | 81 | (26) |

International career
| 2003–2007 | Vietnam | 13 | (1) |
- * Club domestic league appearances and goals

Nguyễn Hữu Thắng (born 22 June 1980) is a former Vietnamese football who played as a midfielder. He joined Binh Duong in 2004 after the club was impressed by his performance in SEA Games 22. In 2007, he was invited for a trial in MLS club Los Angeles Galaxy but failed to impress the coaches. Thang came back to Vietnam and joined Vissai Ninh Bình In 2009, he returned to his old club Becamex Bình Dương.
