= Nguyễn Hữu Thắng (footballer, born 1972) =

Vietnamese footballer and manager

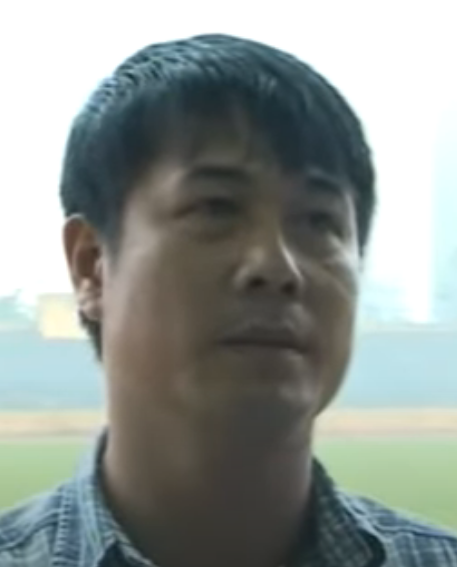
- Hữu Thắng in 2013

Personal information
- Full name: Nguyễn Hữu Thắng
- Date of birth: 1972 (age 53–54)
- Place of birth: Đức Thọ, Hà Tĩnh, North Vietnam
- Height: 1.74 m (5 ft 9 in)
- Position: Defender

Youth career
- 1983–1992: Sông Lam Nghệ An

Senior career*
Years	Team	Apps	(Gls)
1993–2005	Sông Lam Nghệ An	147	(18)
Total		147	(18)

International career
1995–1998	Vietnam	33	(0)
1997–1998	Vietnam Futsal	4	(0)

Managerial career
- 2005: Sông Lam Nghệ An
- 2005: Vietnam U-20
- 2009: Hà Nội
- 2009–2014: Sông Lam Nghệ An
- 2016–2017: Vietnam
- 2016–2017: Vietnam U-23
- 2022: Ho Chi Minh City
- * Club domestic league appearances and goals

Nguyễn Hữu Thắng (born 1972 in Ha Tinh, Vietnam) is a Vietnamese professional football manager and former player.

He was a member and captain of the Vietnam in his playing days. He went to Sông Lam Nghệ An as manager in 2005.

== Early life ==
Hữu Thắng was born in 1972 in Đức Thọ, Hà Tĩnh. His family moved from Đức Thọ to live in Vinh. His parent worked at Nghệ An Print Company (his mother died). Hữu Thắng's ring finger on his right hand is amputated.

== Club career ==
=== Sông Lam Nghệ An ===
Hữu Thắng played for Sông Lam Nghệ An as a player. He retired from being a footballer in 2005.

== International career ==
He played for the Vietnam national football team at the 1996 Tiger Cup, the 1998 Tiger Cup and the 2000 Tiger Cup, as well as the football tournament of the 1995 and 1997 SEA Games.

He also played for the Vietnam national futsal team between 1997 and 1998.

== Manager ==
Hữu Thắng served as manager for several clubs before being appointed as manager of Sông Lam Nghệ An in 2010. Sông Lam Nghệ won the National Cup in 2010 and the V-League and the Super Cup in 2011 under his guidance.

In February 2016, it was announced that Hữu Thắng will be the new manager of the Vietnam national team. On the 4 March 2016 he signed a new contract for two-years.

On 24 August 2017, after being unable to bring Vietnamese team over group stage of SEA games 2017, he resigned his post.

He is currently appointed as the Chairman of Ho Chi Minh Football Club.

== Honors ==
Sông Lam Nghệ An

- Super Cup: 2011 (manager)
- National Cup: 2010 (manager)
- V-League: 2000 (footballer), 2011 (manager)
