= Trần Công Minh (footballer, born 1970) =

Vietnamese football manager and footballer

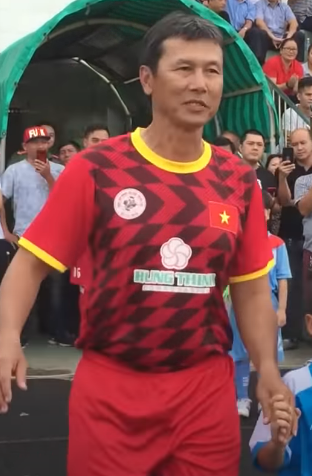
- Công Minh in 2019

Personal information
- Full name: Trần Công Minh
- Date of birth: 1 September 1970 (age 56)
- Place of birth: Đồng Tháp, South Vietnam
- Height: 1.65 m (5 ft 5 in)
- Position: Right back

Youth career
- 1983–1986: Đồng Tháp

Senior career*
Years	Team	Apps	(Gls)
1987–2002	Đồng Tháp	202	(3)

International career
1995–2000	Vietnam	42	(2)
- * Club domestic league appearances and goals

Trần Công Minh (born 1 September 1970) is a Vietnamese football manager and former footballer who last managed Cần Thơ.

== Career ==
Trần spent his entire playing career with Vietnamese side Đồng Tháp and was regarded as an important defender for the Vietnam national football team during the middle to late 1990s.

== International goals ==
No.	Date	Venue	Opponent	Score	Result	Competition
1.	2 September 1996	Jurong, Singapore	Cambodia	1–0	3–1	1996 AFF Championship
2.	7 September 1996	Jurong, Singapore	Myanmar	3–1	4–1	1996 AFF Championship
