= 2008 AFF Championship =

2008 Kejuaraan Sepak Bola ASEAN 2008 อาเซียนฟุตบอลแชมเปียนชิพ
- AFF Suzuki Cup 2008 official logo

Tournament details
- Host country: Indonesia; Thailand (for group stage)
- Dates: 5–28 December
- Teams: 8
- Venues: 3 (in 3 host cities)

Final positions
- Champions: Vietnam (1st title)
- Runners-up: Thailand

Tournament statistics
- Matches played: 18
- Goals scored: 56 (3.11 per match)
- Top scorer(s): (Singapore) Agu Casmir (Indonesia) Budi Sudarsono (Thailand) Teerasil Dangda (4 goals each)
- Best player: (Vietnam) Dương Hồng Sơn
- Fair play award: Thailand

The 2008 AFF Championship was the seventh edition of the tournament. It was primarily sponsored by Suzuki and therefore officially known as the 2008 AFF Suzuki Cup. The group stage was held in Indonesia and Thailand from 5 to 10 December 2008. Two-legged home-and-away semi-finals and finals were held between 16 and 28 December 2008 in Singapore and Vietnam.

Singapore were the two-time defending champions, but were eliminated by Vietnam in the semi-finals. Vietnam, managed by Portuguese Henrique Calisto, won the tournament by a 3–2 victory in the two-legged final against Thailand to win their first title. In 2008, this was rank 7th of the top ten greatest football events in Asia by Goal.com.

== Summary ==
The tournament would originally have been hosted by Myanmar because of the rotation system among ASEAN countries, however, they withdrew in August 2007 due to security concerns. In the third AFF council meeting in Bali, Indonesia and Thailand beat three other countries to win the right to host (the other three were Malaysia, Myanmar and Vietnam). However, if both countries are unable to fulfill certain obligations set by the ASEAN Football Federation (AFF), Vietnam will step in and host the tournament. The winning team will take home USD100,000, runners-up USD 50,000, and USD 15,000 for the losing semi-finalists. Nike will be an official supplier for the 2008 AFF Championship.

10 days before the start of the tournament, safety issues were raised contending the safety of the teams who were due to play in Bangkok. This was because of the riots that were happening in the city which also resulted in the closure of the Suvarnabhumi Airport (see 2008 Thai political crisis for further information). Due to the political crisis, the Football Association of Thailand stated that the Group Stages in the Thai capital Bangkok would go ahead, or if the situation got worse, games would be moved to Chiang Mai in the north of the country or Phuket in the South of the country.

As well as Thailand confirming themselves as steady hosts, Vietnam and Malaysia also stated that they would be prepared to host the tournament at short notice.

On 29 November, with less than one week before the start of the tournament, the group stages held in Thai sport were moved from the capital Bangkok to the southern province Phuket.

== Venues ==
Indonesia prepare Gelora Bung Karno Stadium in the capital city and Si Jalak Harupat Stadium in Bandung, while Thailand prepare Rajamangala Stadium and Suphachalasai Stadium where both of them located in Bangkok. All of the stadiums are 2007 AFC Asian Cup venues except of Si Jalak Harupat Stadium. Bung Karno Stadium will be the opening match venue, while Rajmangala Stadium will be the final match venue.

Group stage matches in Thai sport were switched from the capital Bangkok to the southern provinces Phuket at Surakul Stadium in Phuket City on 29 November due to security issues in Bangkok.

(Indonesia) Jakarta	(Indonesia) Bandung	(Thailand) Phuket
Gelora Bung Karno Stadium	Si Jalak Harupat Stadium	Surakul Stadium
Capacity: 88,083	Capacity: 27,000	Capacity: 15,000
(Thailand) Bangkok	(Vietnam) Hanoi	Singapore
Rajamangala Stadium	Mỹ Đình National Stadium	Singapore National Stadium
Capacity: 49,722	Capacity: 40,192	Capacity: 55,000

== Qualification ==
The qualification took place in Phnom Penh, the capital of Cambodia, from 17 October 2008 to 25 October 2008. The five lower-ranked teams in Southeast Asia play within a round-robin tournament format and the top two countries in the group will qualify for this tournament.

=== Qualified teams ===
The following eight teams qualified for the tournament.

Country	Previous best performance
Thailand	Winners (1996, 2000, 2002)
Singapore	Winners (1998, 2004, 2007)
Indonesia	Runners-up (2000, 2002, 2004)
Vietnam	Runners-up (1998)
Malaysia	Runners-up (1996)
Myanmar	Fourth-place (2004)
Laos	Group stage (1996, 1998, 2000, 2002, 2004, 2007)
Cambodia	Group stage (1996, 2000, 2002, 2004)

== Referees ==
Confirmed referees during the tournament:

- (Brunei) Mohamed Hadimin
- (Indonesia) Midi Setiyono
- (Malaysia) Nafeez Abdul Wahab
- (Malaysia) Ramachandran Krishnan
- (Malaysia) Subkhiddin Mohd Salleh
- (Myanmar) Win Cho
- (Philippines) Allan Martinez
- (Singapore) Abdul Malik
- (Singapore) Pandian Palaniyandi
- (Thailand) Chaiya Mahapab
- (Vietnam) Phùng Đình Dũng
- (Vietnam) Võ Minh Trí

== Group stage ==
=== Group A ===
- All matches were played in Indonesia.
- All times are Western Indonesian Time (WIB) – UTC+7.

Team	Pld	W	D	L	GF	GA	GD	Pts
Singapore	3	3	0	0	10	1	+9	9
Indonesia (H)	3	2	0	1	7	2	+5	6
Myanmar	3	1	0	2	4	8	−4	3
Cambodia	3	0	0	3	2	12	−10	0

5 December 2008
17:00

Singapore	5–0	Cambodia
Casmir 44', 73'; Mustafić 61' (pen.); Sahdan 71'; Alam Shah 89'

Gelora Bung Karno Stadium, Jakarta
Attendance: 18,000
Referee: Chaiya Mahapab (Thailand)

5 December 2008
19:30

Indonesia	3–0	Myanmar
Budi 24'; Firman 28'; Bambang 64'

Gelora Bung Karno Stadium, Jakarta
Attendance: 40,000
Referee: Ramachandran Krishnan (Malaysia)

7 December 2008
17:00

Singapore	3–1	Myanmar
Alam Shah 1'; Casmir 16', 74'		Myo Min Tun 28'

Gelora Bung Karno Stadium, Jakarta
Attendance: 21,000
Referee: Phùng Đình Dũng (Vietnam)

7 December 2008
19:30

Cambodia	0–4	Indonesia
		Budi 15', 54', 70'; Bambang 76'

Gelora Bung Karno Stadium, Jakarta
Attendance: 30,000
Referee: Nafeez Abdul Wahab (Malaysia)

9 December 2008
19:30

Myanmar	3–2	Cambodia
Moe Win 29'; Ya Zar Win Thein 35'; Myo Min Tun 85'		Sokumpheak 40'; Borey 77'

Si Jalak Harupat Stadium, Bandung
Referee: Allan Martinez (Philippines)

9 December 2008
19:30

Indonesia	0–2	Singapore
		Baihakki 3'; Shi Jiayi 50'

Gelora Bung Karno Stadium, Jakarta
Attendance: 50,000
Referee: Ramachandran Krishnan (Malaysia)

=== Group B ===
- All matches were played in Thailand.
- All times are Indochina Time (ICT) – UTC+7

Team	Pld	W	D	L	GF	GA	GD	Pts
Thailand (H)	3	3	0	0	11	0	+11	9
Vietnam	3	2	0	1	7	4	+3	6
Malaysia	3	1	0	2	5	6	−1	3
Laos	3	0	0	3	0	13	−13	0

6 December 2008
17:00

Malaysia	3–0	Laos
Safee 68', 87'; Indra Putra 73'

Surakul Stadium, Phuket
Attendance: 5,000
Referee: Midi Setiyono (Indonesia)

6 December 2008
19:30

Thailand	2–0	Vietnam
Sutee 34'; Suchao 45+4'

Surakul Stadium, Phuket
Attendance: 20,000
Referee: Abdul Malik (Singapore)

8 December 2008
17:00

Malaysia	2–3	Vietnam
Indra Putra 20', 85'		Phạm Thành Lương 16'; Nguyễn Vũ Phong 72', 86'

Surakul Stadium, Phuket
Referee: Pandian Palaniyandi (Singapore)

8 December 2008
19:30

Laos	0–6	Thailand
		Ronnachai 19'; Patiparn 30'; Arthit 40', 52'; Anon 79', 89'

Surakul Stadium, Phuket
Attendance: 10,000
Referee: Mohamed Hadimin (Brunei)

10 December 2008
17:00

Thailand	3–0	Malaysia
Sutee 23'; Teerasil 46', 76'

Surakul Stadium, Phuket
Attendance: 15,000
Referee: Abdul Malik (Singapore)

10 December 2008
19:30

Vietnam	4–0	Laos
Nguyễn Việt Thắng 48'; Phạm Thành Lương 63'; Huỳnh Quang Thanh 66'; Phan Thanh Bình 80'

Surakul Stadium, Phuket
Referee: Win Cho (Myanmar)

== Knockout stage ==
Note: Although the knockout stage was two-legged, the away goals rule was not applied. If the total aggregate score of both teams after both matches remained the same, extra time would have been played, followed by a penalty shoot-out if necessary.

=== Bracket ===
Semi-finals
B1	Thailand	1	2	3
A2	Indonesia	0	1	1
A1	Singapore	0	0	0
B2	Vietnam	0	1	1

Final
B1	Thailand	1	1	2
B2	Vietnam	2	1	3

=== Semi-finals ===
First legs

16 December 2008
19:00 UTC+7

Indonesia	0–1	Thailand
	Report	Teerasil 6'

Gelora Bung Karno Stadium, Jakarta
Attendance: 70,000
Referee: Võ Minh Trí (Vietnam)

17 December 2008
19:00 UTC+7

Vietnam	0–0	Singapore
	Report

Mỹ Đình National Stadium, Hanoi
Attendance: 40,000
Referee: Ramachandran Krishnan (Malaysia)

Second legs

20 December 2008
19:00 UTC+7

Thailand	2–1	Indonesia
Teeratep 73'; Ronnachai 89'	Report	Nova 9'

Rajamangala Stadium, Bangkok
Attendance: 40,000
Referee: Mohamed Hadimin (Brunei)

Thailand won 3–1 on aggregate.

21 December 2008
20:00 UTC+8

Singapore	0–1	Vietnam
	Report	Nguyễn Quang Hải 74'

National Stadium, Singapore
Attendance: 55,000
Referee: Subkhiddin Mohd Salleh (Malaysia)

Vietnam won 1–0 on aggregate.

=== Final ===
First leg

24 December 2008
19:00 UTC+7

Thailand	1–2	Vietnam
Dương Hồng Sơn 75' (o.g.)	Report	Nguyễn Vũ Phong 40'; Lê Công Vinh 42'

Rajamangala Stadium, Bangkok
Attendance: 50,000
Referee: Ramachandran Krishnan (Malaysia)

Second leg

28 December 2008
19:00 UTC+7

Vietnam	1–1	Thailand
Lê Công Vinh 90+4'	Report	Teerasil 21'

Mỹ Đình National Stadium, Hanoi
Attendance: 40,000
Referee: Abdul Malik (Singapore)

Vietnam won 3–2 on aggregate.

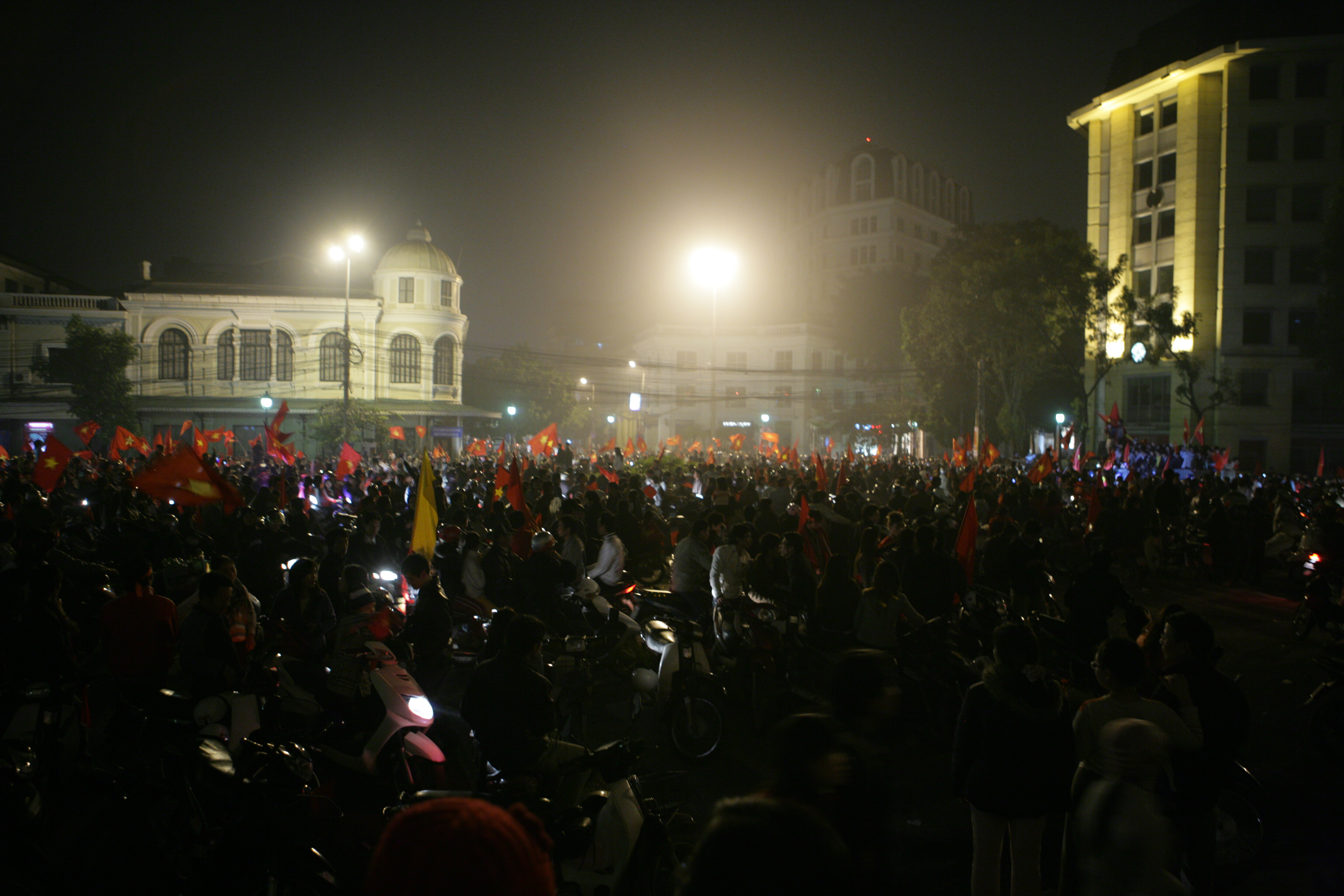
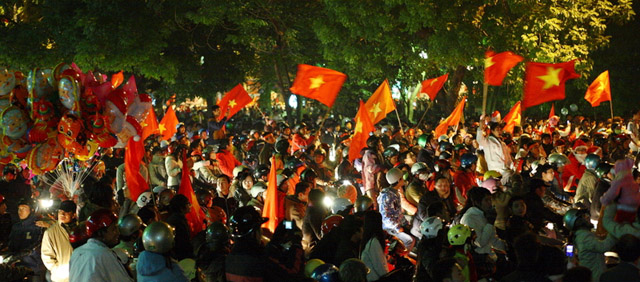
Vietnamese supporters celebrate after the final.

== Awards ==
2008 AFF Championship

Vietnam
First title

Most Valuable Player	Golden Boot	Fair Play Award
(Vietnam) Dương Hồng Sơn	(Singapore) Agu Casmir (Indonesia) Budi Sudarsono (Thailand) Teerasil Dangda	Thailand

== Goalscorers ==
4 goals

- (Indonesia) Budi Sudarsono
- (Singapore) Agu Casmir
- (Thailand) Teerasil Dangda

3 goals

- (Malaysia) Indra Putra Mahayuddin
- (Vietnam) Nguyễn Vũ Phong

2 goals

- (Indonesia) Bambang Pamungkas
- (Malaysia) Safee Sali
- (Myanmar) Myo Min Tun
- (Singapore) Noh Alam Shah
- (Thailand) Anon Sangsanoi
- (Thailand) Arthit Sunthornpit
- (Thailand) Sutee Suksomkit
- (Thailand) Ronnachai Rangsiyo
- (Vietnam) Lê Công Vinh
- (Vietnam) Phạm Thành Lương

1 goal

- (Cambodia) Khim Borey
- (Cambodia) Kouch Sokumpheak
- (Indonesia) Firman Utina
- (Indonesia) Nova Arianto
- (Myanmar) Moe Win
- (Myanmar) Ya Zar Win Thein
- (Singapore) Indra Sahdan Daud
- (Singapore) Fahrudin Mustafić
- (Singapore) Baihakki Khaizan
- (Singapore) Shi Jiayi
- (Thailand) Suchao Nuchnum
- (Thailand) Patiparn Phetphun
- (Thailand) Teerathep Winothai
- (Vietnam) Nguyễn Việt Thắng
- (Vietnam) Huỳnh Quang Thanh
- (Vietnam) Phan Thanh Bình
- (Vietnam) Nguyễn Quang Hải

1 own goal

- (Vietnam) Dương Hồng Sơn

== Team statistics ==
This table shows all team performance.

Pos	Team	Pld	W	D	L	GF	GA	GD	P
Final
1	Vietnam	7	4	2	1	11	6	+5	14
2	Thailand	7	5	1	1	16	4	+12	16
Semi-finals
3	Singapore	5	3	1	1	10	2	+8	10
4	Indonesia	5	2	0	3	8	5	+3	6
Eliminated in the group stage
5	Malaysia	3	1	0	2	5	6	−1	3
6	Myanmar	3	1	0	2	4	8	−4	3
7	Cambodia	3	0	0	3	2	12	−10	0
8	Laos	3	0	0	3	0	13	−13	0
