= 1996 AFF Championship squads =

Association football competition squads

Below are the squads for the 1996 AFF Championship hosted by Singapore, which took place between 1 and 15 September 1996. The players' listed age is their age on the tournament's opening day (1 September 1996).

== Group A ==
=== Indonesia ===
Head coach: Danurwindo

No.	Pos.	Player	Date of birth (age)	Club
1	GK	Listianto Raharjo	2 September 1970 (aged 25)	(Football Association of Indonesia) Pelita Jaya
2	DF	Anang Ma'ruf	20 May 1976 (aged 20)	(Football Association of Indonesia) Persebaya Surabaya
3	DF	Aji Santoso	6 April 1970 (aged 26)	(Football Association of Indonesia) Persebaya Surabaya
4	DF	Yeyen Tumena	16 May 1976 (aged 20)	(Football Association of Indonesia) PSM Makassar
5	DF	Aples Gideon Tecuari	21 April 1973 (aged 23)	(Football Association of Indonesia) Pelita Jaya
6	DF	Robby Darwis	30 October 1964 (aged 31)	(Football Association of Indonesia) Persib Bandung
7	FW	Widodo Putro	8 November 1970 (aged 25)	(Football Association of Indonesia) Petrokimia Putra
8	FW	Peri Sandria	23 September 1969 (aged 26)	(Football Association of Indonesia) Mastrans Bandung Raya
9	DF	Budiman Yunus	5 August 1972 (aged 24)	(Football Association of Indonesia) Mastrans Bandung Raya
10	FW	Kurniawan Dwi Yulianto	13 July 1976 (aged 20)	(Swiss Football Association) Luzern
11	MF	Bima Sakti	23 January 1976 (aged 20)	(Swedish Football Association) Helsingborgs IF
12	MF	Chris Yarangga	21 February 1973 (aged 23)	(Football Association of Indonesia) Persipura Jayapura
14	MF	Eri Irianto	12 January 1974 (aged 22)	(Football Association of Indonesia) Persebaya Surabaya
16	MF	Fachri Husaini (c)	27 July 1965 (aged 31)	(Football Association of Indonesia) Pupuk Kaltim Bontang
18	MF	Supriyono	8 August 1975 (aged 21)	(Football Association of Indonesia) Pelita Jaya
19	DF	Nur'alim	27 December 1973 (aged 22)	(Football Association of Indonesia) Mastrans Bandung Raya
20	GK	Sumardi	26 June 1972 (aged 24)	(Football Association of Indonesia) Pupuk Kaltim Bontang
22	MF	Ansyari Lubis	28 July 1970 (aged 26)	(Football Association of Indonesia) Pelita Jaya
23	GK	Kurnia Sandy	24 August 1975 (aged 21)	(Italian Football Federation) Sampdoria
24	MF	Nandang Kurniadi		(Football Association of Indonesia) Persib Bandung

=== Vietnam ===
Head coach: (Germany) Karl-Heinz Weigang

No.	Pos.	Player	Date of birth (age)	Club
1	GK	Nguyễn Văn Cường	14 June 1966 (aged 30)	(Vietnam Football Federation) Bình Định
2	DF	Lê Đức Anh Tuấn	12 August 1969 (aged 27)	(Vietnam Football Federation) Huế
3	DF	Nguyễn Chí Bảo	8 June 1972 (aged 24)	(Vietnam Football Federation) Hồ Chí Minh City Police
4	DF	Nguyễn Hữu Thắng	2 December 1972 (aged 23)	(Vietnam Football Federation) Sông Lam Nghệ An
5	MF	Võ Hoàng Bửu	10 July 1968 (aged 28)	(Vietnam Football Federation) Cảng Sài Gòn
7	DF	Đỗ Văn Khải	1 April 1974 (aged 22)	(Vietnam Football Federation) Hải Quan
8	MF	Nguyễn Hồng Sơn	9 October 1970 (aged 25)	(Vietnam Football Federation) Thể Công
9	FW	Huỳnh Quốc Cường	15 August 1972 (aged 24)	(Vietnam Football Federation) Đồng Tháp
10	FW	Lê Huỳnh Đức	20 April 1972 (aged 24)	(Vietnam Football Federation) Hồ Chí Minh City Police
14	MF	Nguyễn Hữu Đang	5 March 1969 (aged 27)	(Vietnam Football Federation) Khánh Hòa
15	DF	Nguyễn Mạnh Cường (c)	5 August 1965 (aged 31)	(Vietnam Football Federation) Thể Công
16	GK	Nguyễn Văn Phụng	12 February 1968 (aged 28)	(Vietnam Football Federation) Cảng Sài Gòn
17	DF	Nguyễn Phan Hoài Linh	5 June 1973 (aged 23)	(Vietnam Football Federation) Hồ Chí Minh City Police
18	FW	Đặng Phương Nam	15 December 1976 (aged 19)	(Vietnam Football Federation) Thể Công
19	MF	Nguyễn Hồng Hải	24 September 1972 (aged 23)	(Vietnam Football Federation) Lâm Đồng
20	DF	Trần Công Minh	1 September 1970 (aged 26)	(Vietnam Football Federation) Đồng Tháp
23	DF	Nguyễn Thiện Quang	13 March 1970 (aged 26)	(Vietnam Football Federation) Hồ Chí Minh City Police
25	FW	Ngô Quang Trường	21 January 1972 (aged 24)	(Vietnam Football Federation) Sông Lam Nghệ An

=== Myanmar ===
Head coach: (Federal Republic of Yugoslavia) Ratomir Dujković

No.	Pos.	Player	Date of birth (age)	Caps	Club
	DF	Maung Maung Oo			(Myanmar)
	MF	Tin Myo Aung			(Myanmar)
	MF	U Chit Naing			(Myanmar)
	MF	Maung Maung Htay	4 March 1976 (aged 20)		(Myanmar)
	FW	Myo Hlaing Win	24 May 1973 (aged 23)		(Myanmar) Mountain Lion FC
	FW	Win Aung			(Myanmar)

=== Laos ===
Head coach: Songphu Phongsa

No.	Pos.	Player	Date of birth (age)	Caps	Club
	GK	Soulivanh Xenvilay	14 March 1963 (aged 33)		(Laos)
	DF	Khamsay Chanthavong			(Laos)
	DF	Vilayphone Sayavong	4 September 1973 (aged 22)		(Laos)
	DF	Phonepadith Xayavong	1 March 1972 (aged 24)		(Laos)
	DF	Ananh Thepsouvanh	21 October 1981 (aged 14)		(Laos)
	MF	Saysana Savatdy	25 March 1963 (aged 33)		(Laos)
	MF	Chalana Luang-Amath	10 May 1972 (aged 24)		(Laos) Lao Army
	MF	Khonesavanh Homsombath	23 October 1972 (aged 23)		(Laos)
	FW	Bounlap Khenkitisack	19 June 1966 (aged 30)		(Laos)
	FW	Keolakhone Channiphone	10 January 1970 (aged 26)		(Laos)
		Phimmasean Phonesavanh			(Laos)
		Thanongsine Souryamath			(Laos)
		Bounlap Thongsouvannarath			(Laos)
		Bounlap Vannbouathong			(Laos)

=== Cambodia ===
Head coach: (Germany) Joachim Fickert

No.	Pos.	Player	Date of birth (age)	Caps	Club
1	GK	Nhem Bunthon	5 October 1972 (aged 23)		(Cambodia)
2	MF	So Serei Vuth	1 January 1967 (aged 29)		(Cambodia)
3	DF	Pros Him	1 August 1976 (aged 20)		(Cambodia)
5	DF	Ing Keochenda			(Cambodia)
6	DF	Hem Samkai	6 June 1967 (aged 29)		(Cambodia)
7	MF	Oum Savong	7 January 1971 (aged 25)		(Cambodia)
8	MF	Nuth Sony			(Cambodia)
9	FW	Prak Sovannara	7 November 1972 (aged 23)		(Cambodia) Body Guards Club
10	FW	Hok Sochetra	11 November 1973 (aged 22)		(Cambodia)
12	GK	Ouk Chamrong	15 April 1969 (aged 27)		(Cambodia)
13	DF	Chuon Maline	15 July 1970 (aged 26)		(Cambodia)
14	MF	Kert Bunnarith			(Cambodia)
15	MF	Prak Vuthy	5 August 1970 (aged 26)		(Cambodia)
16	FW	Chan Arunreath	1 July 1973 (aged 23)		(Cambodia)
18	DF	Lim Raksmey	9 December 1975 (aged 20)		(Cambodia)
19		Sib Sovannarith	5 January 1968 (aged 28)		(Cambodia)
22		Phum Phanarith	1 May 1976 (aged 20)		(Cambodia)
24		Nou Pechkiri	18 January 1970 (aged 26)		(Cambodia)
28		Thon Vuthy	13 June 1968 (aged 28)		(Cambodia)

== Group B ==
=== Thailand ===
Head coach: Thawatchai Sartjakul

No.	Pos.	Player	Date of birth (age)	Club
1	GK	Wacharapong Somcit	21 August 1975 (aged 21)	(Football Association of Thailand) Bangkok Bank F.C.
2	DF	Kritsada Piandit	2 December 1971 (aged 24)	(Football Association of Thailand) TOT
4	DF	Pattanapong Sripramote	3 February 1974 (aged 22)	(Football Association of Thailand) Raj Pracha
5	DF	Jakarat Tonhongsa	29 September 1973 (aged 22)	(Football Association of Thailand) Osotsapa
7	DF	Natee Thongsookkaew(c)	9 November 1966 (aged 29)	(Football Association of Thailand) Royal Thai Police
6	MF	Sanor Longsawang	2 December 1971 (aged 24)	(Football Association of Thailand) Thai Farmer Bank
8	MF	Apichad Thaveechalermdit	10 January 1965 (aged 31)	(Football Association of Thailand) Bangkok Bank F.C.
9	FW	Netipong Srithong-in	8 September 1972 (aged 23)	(Football Association of Thailand) Thai Farmer Bank
11	MF	Yutthana Polsak	21 March 1970 (aged 26)	(Football Association of Thailand) Raj Pracha
12	MF	Surachai Jaturapattarapong	20 November 1969 (aged 26)	(Football Association of Thailand) Stock Exchange of Thailand
13	FW	Kiatisuk Senamuang	11 August 1973 (aged 23)	(Football Association of Thailand) Raj Pracha
14	FW	Worrawoot Srimaka	8 December 1971 (aged 24)	(Football Association of Thailand) BEC Tero Sasana F.C.
17	MF	Dusit Chalermsan	22 April 1970 (aged 26)	(Football Association of Thailand) BEC Tero Sasana F.C.
18	GK	Nipon Malanont	10 November 1966 (aged 29)	(Football Association of Thailand) Thai Farmer Bank
19	DF	Surachai Jirasirichote	13 October 1970 (aged 25)	(Football Association of Thailand) Sinthana
22	MF	Phithaya Santawong	18 January 1967 (aged 29)	(Football Association of Thailand) Stock Exchange of Thailand
	DF	Thiwakorn Suksod		(Football Association of Thailand) Air Force United
	FW	Samarn Disantiae		(Football Association of Thailand) Raj Pracha

=== Malaysia ===
Head coach: Wan Jamak Wan Hassan

No.	Pos.	Player	Date of birth (age)	Club
1	GK	Muadzar Mohamad	20 January 1966 (aged 30)	(Football Association of Malaysia) Pahang FA
3	DF	Faizal Zainal	12 February 1974 (aged 22)	(Football Association of Malaysia) Negeri Sembilan FA
4	MF	Mohd Rizal Sukiman	24 September 1972 (aged 23)	(Football Association of Malaysia) Johor FA
5	DF	Rajanikandh Batumalai	2 October 1974 (aged 21)	(Football Association of Malaysia) Negeri Sembilan FA
6	MF	Chandran Munusamy	4 March 1975 (aged 21)	(Football Association of Malaysia) Selangor FA
7	DF	Nazri Yunos	28 December 1972 (aged 23)	(Football Association of Malaysia) Sarawak FA
9	MF	Dollah Salleh	10 October 1963 (aged 32)	(Football Association of Malaysia) Pahang FA
12	MF	K. Sanbagamaran	19 February 1972 (aged 24)	(Football Association of Malaysia) Selangor FA
13	DF	Zami Mohamad Noor	24 February 1972 (aged 24)	(Football Association of Malaysia) Negeri Sembilan FA
14	FW	Sulong Rosdee	15 September 1972 (aged 23)	(Football Association of Malaysia) Johor FA
15	DF	Azmil Azali	23 March 1973 (aged 23)	(Football Association of Malaysia) Johor FA
16	MF	Idris Abdul Karim	29 November 1976 (aged 19)	(Football Association of Malaysia) Johor FA
17	DF	Zainal Abidin Hassan	9 November 1962 (aged 33)	(Football Association of Malaysia) Pahang FA
18	MF	Yap Wai Loon	22 December 1969 (aged 26)	(Football Association of Malaysia) Kuala Lumpur FA
19	FW	Azman Adnan	1 November 1971 (aged 24)	(Football Association of Malaysia) Selangor FA
22	GK	Khairul Azman Mohamed	5 March 1968 (aged 28)	(Football Association of Malaysia) Sabah FA
	DF	Mohd Raizuwah Idris	N/A	(Football Association of Malaysia) Pahang FA
	FW	Anuar Abu Bakar	28 April 1971 (aged 25)	(Football Association of Malaysia) Selangor FA
	FW	Shamsurin Abdul Rahman	7 July 1967 (aged 29)	(Football Association of Malaysia) Sarawak FA

=== Singapore ===
Head coach: (England) Barry Whitbread

No.	Pos.	Player	Date of birth (age)	Club
1	GK	David Lee	10 April 1958 (aged 38)	(Football Association of Singapore) Geylang United
	GK	Bashir Khan		(Football Association of Singapore)
	DF	Lim Tong Hai	14 May 1969 (aged 27)	(Football Association of Singapore) Tiong Bahru United
	DF	Kadir Yahaya	15 February 1968 (aged 28)	(Football Association of Singapore) Geylang United
	DF	Aide Iskandar	28 May 1975 (aged 21)	(Football Association of Singapore) Police
	DF	Shunmugham Subramani	5 August 1972 (aged 24)	(Football Association of Singapore) Tiong Bahru United
	DF	Saswadimata Dasuki	8 April 1969 (aged 27)	(Football Association of Singapore) Tiong Bahru United
	DF	Borhan Abu Samah	30 November 1964 (aged 31)	(Football Association of Singapore) Geylang United
12	MF	Zulkarnaen Zainal	1 October 1973 (aged 22)	(Football Association of Singapore) Geylang United
3	MF	Rafi Ali	11 December 1972 (aged 23)	(Football Association of Singapore) Singapore Armed Forces
11	MF	Nazri Nasir	17 January 1971 (aged 25)	(Football Association of Singapore) Sembawang Rangers
	MF	Hasnim Haron	21 December 1966 (aged 29)	(Football Association of Malaysia) Johor FA
	MF	Malek Awab	11 January 1961 (aged 35)	(Football Association of Singapore) Tampines Rovers
	MF	Zulkifli Kartoyoho	21 April 1964 (aged 32)	(Football Association of Singapore)
	MF	Samawira Basri	2 September 1972 (aged 23)	(Football Association of Singapore) Tiong Bahru United
14	MF	Steven Tan	28 December 1970 (aged 25)	(Football Association of Singapore) Tiong Bahru United
20	FW	V. Selvaraj	12 February 1969 (aged 27)	(Football Association of Singapore) Singapore Armed Forces
17	FW	Fandi Ahmad (c)	29 May 1962 (aged 34)	(Football Association of Singapore) Geylang United

=== Brunei Darussalam ===
Head coach: (England) Dave Booth

No.	Pos.	Player	Date of birth (age)	Caps	Club
	GK	Ibrahim Abu Bakar	30 August 1959 (aged 37)		Brunei FA
	GK	Yunos Yusof	1965		Brunei FA
	DF	Johan Zinin	12 February 1974 (aged 22)		Brunei FA
	DF	Liew Chuan Fue	9 November 1962 (aged 33)		Brunei FA
	DF	Martilu Mohamed			Brunei FA
	DF	Nordin Tujoh			Brunei FA
	DF	Sharbini Mohiddin			Brunei FA
	DF	Yussri Ramli			Brunei FA
	MF	Ali Mustafa	24 May 1976 (aged 20)		Brunei FA
	MF	Azamanuddin Gillen			Brunei FA
	MF	Hussin Moktal			Brunei FA
	MF	Irwan Mohammad	13 January 1975 (aged 21)		Brunei FA
	MF	Rosaidi Khamis	28 November 1971 (aged 24)		Brunei FA
	MF	Rosli Liman	12 May 1969 (aged 27)		Brunei FA
	FW	Moksen Mohammad	22 August 1971 (aged 25)		Brunei FA
	FW	Rosanan Samak	18 July 1965 (aged 31)		Brunei FA
	FW	Suni Mat Jerah	4 May 1968 (aged 28)		Brunei FA
	FW	Zaini Tumih			Brunei FA
	FW	Zainuddin Kassim	1 November 1965 (aged 30)		Brunei FA

=== Philippines ===
Head coach: Noel Casilao

Note: Only partial squad known.

No.	Pos.	Player	Date of birth (age)	Caps	Club
	GK	Jose Marcelino Carpio	2 June 1965 (aged 31)		(Philippines)
	GK	Jules Villanueva			(Philippines)
	DF	Alvin Ocampo	5 August 1977 (aged 19)		(Philippines)
	DF	Loreto Kalalang	24 August 1974 (aged 22)		(Philippines)
	DF	Judy Saluria	11 December 1970 (aged 25)		(Philippines) Philippine Army
	DF	Gil Talavera	7 December 1972 (aged 23)		(Philippines)
	DF	Ramil Maungca	16 October 1976 (aged 19)		(Philippines)
	MF	Marlon Piñero	10 January 1972 (aged 24)		(Philippines)
	MF	Jeofrey Lobaton	10 September 1975 (aged 20)		(Philippines) Philippine Army
	MF	Eduardo Marasigan	13 June 1971 (aged 25)		(Philippines)
	MF	Vicente Filamer Rosell	4 July 1967 (aged 29)		(Philippines)
	MF	Roberto Bayona			(Philippines)
	MF	Randy Valbuena			(Philippines)
	FW	Maxie Abad (c)			(Philippines)
	FW	Reydric Viliran	16 May 1974 (aged 22)		(Philippines)
		Christopher Belandres			(Philippines)
