= Vietnam national football team results (1983–2009) =

This article provides details of football games played by the Vietnam national football team from 1983 to 2009.

After Vietnam's reunification in 1975, the team had a long period of absence from international football stage due to economic difficulties and international isolation. Following an extended training tour in Hungary and the Soviet Union, the Vietnam national team played its first international match on 13 September 1983 against the Cambodian national team in Hàng Đẫy Stadium, Hanoi. The match was attended by FIFA President João Havelange, who was visiting Vietnam at the time to promote the development of football in the country. After the match, Vietnam national team disbanded and did not play any official international football matches for the next eight years.

Vietnam only re-joined the international stage by participating in the 1991 edition of the Southeast Asian Games (SEA Games) in Manila, Philippines. Since then, Vietnam has consistently participated in every official tournament possible.

== Results ==
Keynotes
Win
Draw
Defeat

=== 1980–1989 results ===
==== 1983 ====
13 September Friendly	Vietnam	0–0	Kampuchea	Hanoi, Vietnam
		Report		Stadium: Hàng Đẫy Stadium; Attendance: 30,000

==== 1984 ====
26 July Friendly	Vietnam	4–1	Kampuchea	Hanoi, Vietnam
				Stadium: Hàng Đẫy Stadium; Attendance: 25,000

==== 1989 ====
24 December Indochina Four Nations Tournament	Laos	Cancelled	Vietnam	Bangkok, Thailand
		Report
Note: Cambodia and Vietnam withdrew from the tournament

26 December Indochina Four Nations Tournament	Cambodia	Cancelled	Vietnam	Bangkok, Thailand
		Report
Note: Cambodia and Vietnam withdrew from the tournament

27 December Indochina Four Nations Tournament	Thailand	Cancelled	Vietnam	Bangkok, Thailand
		Report
Note: Cambodia and Vietnam withdrew from the tournament

=== 1990–1999 results ===
==== 1991 ====
26 November SEA Games GS	Philippines	2–2	Vietnam	Manila, Philippines
	N. Fegidero (?); Rosell (?)		Nguyễn Văn Dũng	Stadium: Rizal Memorial Stadium

28 November SEA Games GS	Vietnam	0–1	Indonesia	Manila, Philippines
			Darwis 35'	Stadium: Rizal Memorial Stadium

30 November SEA Games GS	Malaysia	2–1	Vietnam	Manila, Philippines
	Adnan 24', 69'		Nguyễn Văn Dũng 60'	Stadium: Rizal Memorial Stadium

15 December Friendly	Thailand	2–2	Vietnam	Bangkok, Thailand
		Report

==== 1993 ====
1 March Friendly	Vietnam	0–0	Myanmar	Thanh Hóa, Vietnam
		Report		Stadium: Thanh Hóa Stadium

9 April World Cup qualifier R1	North Korea	3–0	Vietnam	Doha, Qatar
16:00	Yun Jong-Su 29'; Choe Yong-Son 85'; Ryu Song-Gun 86'	Report		Stadium: Khalifa International Stadium; Attendance: 2,500; Referee: Sanhoub Mohammed Yahia (Yemen)

11 April World Cup qualifier R1	Qatar	4–0	Vietnam	Doha, Qatar
18:15	Fazli 34'; Soufi 37'; Khalaf 50'; Al-Kuwari 60'	Report		Stadium: Khalifa International Stadium; Attendance: 7,500; Referee: Wang Xuezhi (China)

13 April World Cup qualifier R1	Vietnam	2–3	Singapore	Doha, Qatar
18:15	Lư Đình Tuấn 14'; Phan Thanh Hùng 77'	Report	Ahmad 19'; Tan 35' (pen.); Sundramoorthy 73'	Stadium: Khalifa International Stadium; Attendance: 100; Referee: Shinichiro Obata (Japan)

16 April World Cup qualifier R1	Vietnam	1–0	Indonesia	Doha, Qatar
18:15	Hà Vương Ngầu Nại 61'	Report		Stadium: Khalifa International Stadium; Attendance: 1,000; Referee: Ishad Abu Ali (Jordan)

24 April World Cup qualifier R1	Vietnam	0–1	North Korea	Kallang, Singapore
20:30		Report	Yong Jin-Li 61'	Stadium: Singapore National Stadium; Attendance: 3,000; Referee: Abayawansa Mahasena Yapa (Sri Lanka)

26 April World Cup qualifier R1	Vietnam	0–4	Qatar	Kallang, Singapore
20:30		Report	Al-Malki 7'; Z. Al-Kuwari 13'; F. Al-Kuwari 52' (pen.); Al-Boloushi 65'	Stadium: Singapore National Stadium; Attendance: 10,000; Referee: Chang Shan Yi (Chinese Taipei)

28 April World Cup qualifier R1	Singapore	1–0	Vietnam	Kallang, Singapore
20:30	Ali 54'	Report		Stadium: Singapore National Stadium; Attendance: 15,000; Referee: Abharan Alvari (Iran)

30 April World Cup qualifier R1	Indonesia	2–1	Vietnam	Kallang, Singapore
20:30	Putut 55'; Sudirman 75'	Report	Nguyễn Hồng Sơn 30'	Stadium: Singapore National Stadium; Attendance: 10,000; Referee: Ibrahim Leamash (United Arab Emirates)

9 June SEA Games GS	Indonesia	1–0	Vietnam	Kallang, Singapore
21:00	Taufik 51'	Report		Stadium: Singapore National Stadium; Attendance: 15,000; Referee: Tamat Budin (Brunei)

11 June SEA Games GS	Vietnam	1–0	Philippines	Kallang, Singapore
21:00	Nguyễn Văn Long 66'	Report		Stadium: Singapore National Stadium; Attendance: 6,000; Referee: Soe Thein (Myanmar)

15 June SEA Games GS	Singapore	2–0	Vietnam	Kallang, Singapore
19:00	Malek 18'; Sundramoorthy 57'	Report		Stadium: Singapore National Stadium; Attendance: 20,000; Referee: Pirom Un-prasert (Thailand)

==== 1995 ====
4 January Independence Cup	Vietnam	1–0	Estonia	Ho Chi Minh City, Vietnam
	Lê Huỳnh Đức 66'	Report		Stadium: Thống Nhất Stadium; Attendance: 12,060

4 December SEA Games GS	Vietnam	2–0	Malaysia	Chiang Mai, Thailand
	Huỳnh Quốc Cường 55'; Võ Hoàng Bửu 83' (pen.)	Report		Stadium: 700th Anniversary Stadium

8 December SEA Games GS	Vietnam	4–0	Cambodia	Lamphun, Thailand
	Nguyễn Hồng Sơn 20', 55'; Nguyễn Hữu Đang 47'; Huỳnh Quốc Cường 82'			Stadium: Lamphun Province Stadium

10 December SEA Games GS	Thailand	3–1	Vietnam	Chiang Mai, Thailand
	Natipong 2', 69'; Tawan 44'	Report	Nguyễn Hữu Đang 89'	Stadium: 700th Anniversary Stadium; Attendance: 20,000; Referee: Khin Maung Thein (Myanmar)

12 December SEA Games GS	Indonesia	0–1	Vietnam	Lamphun, Thailand
			Nguyễn Hữu Đang	Stadium: Lamphun Province Stadium

14 December SEA Games SF	Myanmar	1–2 (a.e.t.)	Vietnam	Chiang Mai, Thailand
	Myo Hlaing Win 7'		Lê Huỳnh Đức 15'; Trần Minh Chiến 95'	Stadium: 700th Anniversary Stadium

16 December SEA Games F	Thailand	4–0	Vietnam	Chiang Mai, Thailand
	Tawan; Natipong			Stadium: 700th Anniversary Stadium; Attendance: 22,000; Referee: Khairul Agil (Indonesia)

==== 1996 ====
4 August Asian Cup qualifier	Vietnam	4–1	Chinese Taipei	Ho Chi Minh City, Vietnam
	Lê Huỳnh Đức 16', 56', 64'; Nguyễn Hồng Sơn 75'		Huang Che-ming 23'	Stadium: Thống Nhất Stadium

7 August Asian Cup qualifier	Vietnam	9–0	Guam	Ho Chi Minh City, Vietnam
	Chu Văn Mùi 28', 44'; Đặng Phương Nam 32', 52', 77'; Nguyễn Chí Bảo 56', 65'; Nguyễn Mạnh Cường 60'; Lê Huỳnh Đức 72'			Stadium: Thống Nhất Stadium; Attendance: 192; Referee: Kyaw U Kyaw (Myanmar)

11 August Asian Cup qualifier	Vietnam	0–4	South Korea	Ho Chi Minh City, Vietnam
17:00			Shin Tae-yong 1'; Roh Sang-rae 8'; Park Tae-ha 17'; Seo Hyo-won 83'	Stadium: Thống Nhất Stadium; Referee: Chalach Piromya (Thailand)

2 September AFF Cup GS	Vietnam	3–1	Cambodia	Jurong, Singapore
	Trần Công Minh 21'; Lê Huỳnh Đức 30'; Võ Hoàng Bửu 80' (pen.)		Sony 67'	Stadium: Jurong Stadium; Attendance: 2,800

5 September AFF Cup GS	Laos	1–1	Vietnam	Jurong, Singapore
	Luang-Amath 72'		Lê Huỳnh Đức 85'	Stadium: Jurong Stadium; Attendance: 1,400

7 September AFF Cup GS	Vietnam	4–1	Myanmar	Jurong, Singapore
	Nguyễn Hữu Đang 6'; Lê Huỳnh Đức 15'; Trần Công Minh 48'; Nguyễn Hồng Sơn 63'		Maung Maung Htay 24'	Stadium: Jurong Stadium; Attendance: 2,000

11 September AFF Cup GS	Indonesia	1–1	Vietnam	Jurong, Singapore
	Kurniawan 43'		Võ Hoàng Bửu 77' (pen.)	Stadium: Jurong Stadium; Attendance: 1,300

13 September AFF Cup SF	Thailand	4–2	Vietnam	Kallang, Singapore
	Kiatisuk 3'; Natipong 9', 24'; Srimaka 46'		Võ Hoàng Bửu 83' (pen.); Nguyễn Hồng Sơn 88'	Stadium: Singapore National Stadium; Attendance: 20,000

15 September AFF Cup 3rd place	Indonesia	2–3	Vietnam	Kallang, Singapore
	Kurniawan 66'; Tecuari 85'		Huỳnh Quốc Cường 8'; Yeyen 27' (o.g.); Võ Hoàng Bửu 73' (pen.)	Stadium: Singapore National Stadium

==== 1997 ====
22 February Dunhill Cup GS	Vietnam	0–4	Bosnia and Herzegovina	Kuala Lumpur, Malaysia
		Report	Muharemović 29'; Pintul 45' (pen.); Smječanin 52' (pen.); Repuh 87'	Stadium: Merdeka Stadium; Attendance: 18,000; Referee: Nik Ahmad Haji Yaakub (Malaysia)

24 February Dunhill Cup GS	Indonesia	1–0	Vietnam	Kuala Lumpur, Malaysia
	Widodo Putro 3'	Report		Stadium: Merdeka Stadium

26 February Dunhill Cup GS	Zimbabwe	6–0	Vietnam	Kuala Lumpur, Malaysia
	Mushangazhike 5', 8', 55'; Bunjira 7', 83'; Zviripayi 70'	Report		Stadium: Merdeka Stadium

4 May World Cup qualifier R1	Tajikistan	4–0	Vietnam	Dushanbe, Tajikistan
	Alidodov 8'; Muminov 15'; Dzhaborov 50', 84'	Report		Stadium: Pamir Stadium; Attendance: 18,000; Referee: Alexander Koulzalov (Kazakhstan)

11 May World Cup qualifier R1	Turkmenistan	2–1	Vietnam	Ashgabat, Turkmenistan
	Agabaýew 39'; Gulýan 53'	Report	Nguyễn Công Vinh 71'	Stadium: Nisa-Çandybil Stadium; Attendance: 2,500; Referee: Gyanu Shrestha (Nepal)

25 May World Cup qualifier R1	Vietnam	1–3	China	Ho Chi Minh City, Vietnam
	Lê Huỳnh Đức 38'	Report	Li Bing 21'; Fan Zhiyi 30'; Hao Haidong 45'	Stadium: Thống Nhất Stadium; Referee: Russamee Jindamai (Thailand)

1 June World Cup qualifier R1	Vietnam	0–4	Tajikistan	Ho Chi Minh City, Vietnam
		Report	Muminov 5'; Alidodov 24'; Avakov 67'; Ashurmamadov 75'	Stadium: Thống Nhất Stadium; Attendance: 10,000; Referee: Ngadiman Asri (Indonesia)

8 June World Cup qualifier R1	Vietnam	0–4	Turkmenistan	Ho Chi Minh City, Vietnam
		Report	Agaýew 16', 57', 63'; Broşin 20'	Stadium: Thống Nhất Stadium; Attendance: 5,000; Referee: Kyaw U Kyaw (Myanmar)

22 June World Cup qualifier R1	China	4–0	Vietnam	Beijing, China
	Fan Zhiyi 6'; Hao Haidong 44'; Ma Mingyu 64'; Su Maozhen 67'	Report		Stadium: Workers' Stadium; Referee: Chang Sok-jin (North Korea)

September Friendly	Thailand	3–0	Vietnam	Bangkok, Thailand
	Natipong; Totchtawan; Worrawoot	Report

5 October SEA Games GS	Vietnam	0–1	Malaysia	Jakarta, Indonesia
		Report	Mohamed 23'	Stadium: Gelora Senayan Main Stadium

7 October SEA Games GS	Indonesia	2–2	Vietnam	Jakarta, Indonesia
	Sakti; Kurniawan		Văn Sỹ Hùng	Stadium: Gelora Senayan Main Stadium

12 October SEA Games GS	Vietnam	2–1	Laos	Jakarta, Indonesia
	Vũ Minh Hiếu		Thepsouvanh	Stadium: Gelora Senayan Main Stadium

14 October SEA Games GS	Vietnam	3–0	Philippines	Jakarta, Indonesia
	Triệu Quang Hà; Lê Huỳnh Đức; Trần Công Minh			Stadium: Gelora Senayan Main Stadium

16 October SEA Games SF	Thailand	2–1	Vietnam	Jakarta, Indonesia
	Kiatisuk 3' (?)		Võ Hoàng Bửu 33' (pen.)	Stadium: Gelora Senayan Main Stadium

18 October SEA Games 3rd place	Vietnam	1–0	Singapore	Jakarta, Indonesia
	Nguyễn Phúc Nguyên Chương			Stadium: Gelora Senayan Main Stadium

==== 1998 ====
26 August AFF Cup GS	Vietnam	4–1	Laos	Hanoi, Vietnam
20:45	Nguyễn Hồng Sơn 30'; Nguyễn Văn Sỹ 43'; Lê Huỳnh Đức 85', 90'		Keolakhone 55'	Stadium: Hàng Đẫy Stadium; Attendance: 20,000; Referee: Hanlumyaung Panya (Thailand)

28 August AFF Cup GS	Vietnam	0–0	Singapore	Hanoi, Vietnam
20:45				Stadium: Hàng Đẫy Stadium; Attendance: 15,000; Referee: Jerry Andres (Philippines)

30 August AFF Cup GS	Vietnam	1–0	Malaysia	Hanoi, Vietnam
20:45	Nguyễn Hồng Sơn 50'			Stadium: Hàng Đẫy Stadium; Attendance: 15,000; Referee: Hanlumyaung Panya (Thailand)

3 September AFF Cup SF	Thailand	0–3	Vietnam	Hanoi, Vietnam
20:00			Trương Việt Hoàng 15'; Nguyễn Hồng Sơn 70'; Văn Sỹ Hùng 80'	Stadium: Hàng Đẫy Stadium; Attendance: 23,000

5 September AFF Cup F	Vietnam	0–1	Singapore	Hanoi, Vietnam
20:00			Sasikumar 70'	Stadium: Hàng Đẫy Stadium; Attendance: 25,000; Referee: Kim Young-joo (Korea Republic)

19 November Friendly	Hong Kong	1–1	Vietnam	Mong Kok, Hong Kong
				Stadium: Mong Kok Stadium

30 November Asian Games R1	Turkmenistan	2–0	Vietnam	Nakhon Sawan, Thailand
15:30	Zawýalow 6'; Bondarenko 23'	Report		Stadium: Nakhon Sawan Stadium

4 December Asian Games R1	Vietnam	0–4	South Korea	Nakhon Sawan, Thailand
15:30		Report	Kim Eun-jung 30'; Choi Yong-soo 43', 87'; Yoon Jong-hwan 67'	Stadium: Nakhon Sawan Stadium

==== 1999 ====
29 January Dunhill Cup GS	Vietnam	1–0	Singapore	Ho Chi Minh City, Vietnam
	Văn Sỹ Hùng 56'	Report		Stadium: Thống Nhất Stadium

31 January Dunhill Cup GS	Vietnam	1–0	Russia	Ho Chi Minh City, Vietnam
	Nguyễn Phi Hùng 24'	Report		Stadium: Thống Nhất Stadium

2 February Dunhill Cup GS	Iran	2–2	Vietnam	Ho Chi Minh City, Vietnam
	Jamshidi 84'; Majidi 89'	Report	Lê Huỳnh Đức 16'; Nguyễn Phi Hùng 79'	Stadium: Thống Nhất Stadium

5 February Dunhill Cup SF	Vietnam	1–4	China	Ho Chi Minh City, Vietnam
	Lê Huỳnh Đức 90'	Report	Zhang Yuning 13', 75'; Wang Peng 15'; Huang Yong 64'	Stadium: Thống Nhất Stadium

30 July SEA Games GS	Vietnam	9–0	Laos	Bandar Seri Begawan, Brunei
	Lê Huỳnh Đức 3', 13', 18', 27'; Văn Sỹ Hùng 60', 72', 79'; Triệu Quang Hà 76'; Đặng Phương Nam 90'			Stadium: Berakas Sports Complex; Attendance: 1,000; Referee: Serang Muchilis (Indonesia)

3 August SEA Games GS	Myanmar	0–2	Vietnam	Bandar Seri Begawan, Brunei
			Trương Việt Hoàng 77'; Đặng Phương Nam 82'	Stadium: Berakas Track and Field Complex; Attendance: 1,000; Referee: Zulkifle Haji Duraman (Brunei)

5 August SEA Games GS	Vietnam	0–0	Thailand	Bandar Seri Begawan, Brunei
		Report	Trương Việt Hoàng 77'; Đặng Phương Nam 82'	Stadium: Berakas Sports Complex; Attendance: 7,000; Referee: Zulkifle Haji Duraman (Brunei)

8 August SEA Games GS	Philippines	0–2	Vietnam	Bandar Seri Begawan, Brunei
			Đặng Phương Nam 44', 49'	Stadium: Berakas Track and Field Complex; Attendance: 500; Referee: Mohd Abdullah (Brunei)

12 August SEA Games SF	Indonesia	0–1	Vietnam	Bandar Seri Begawan, Brunei
			Nguyễn Hồng Sơn 70'	Stadium: Hassanal Bolkiah Stadium; Attendance: 3,000; Referee: Sun Bao Jie (China)

14 August SEA Games F	Thailand	2–0	Vietnam	Bandar Seri Begawan, Brunei
	Thawatchai 39'; Dusit 85'	Report		Stadium: Hassanal Bolkiah Stadium; Attendance: 3,000; Referee: Kwong Jong Cheol (South Korea)

=== 2000–2009 results ===
==== 2000 ====
23 January Asian Cup qualifier	Vietnam	11–0	Guam	Ho Chi Minh City, Vietnam
	Phạm Như Thuần 1'; Vũ Công Tuyền 2', 12', 13', 19', 90+3'; Văn Sỹ Hùng 39', 81'; Võ Minh Hiếu 45'; Đặng Phương Nam 59'; Ngô Quang Trường 75'			Stadium: Thống Nhất Stadium

26 January Asian Cup qualifier	Vietnam	3–0	Philippines	Ho Chi Minh City, Vietnam
	Vũ Công Tuyền 21'; Ngô Quang Trường 72', 88'			Stadium: Thống Nhất Stadium

29 January Asian Cup qualifier	Vietnam	0–2	China	Ho Chi Minh City, Vietnam
			Su Maozhen 27'; Zhang Enhua 89'	Stadium: Thống Nhất Stadium; Attendance: 16,000

25 August LG Cup	Vietnam	2–2	Sri Lanka	Ho Chi Minh City, Vietnam
	Nguyễn Hồng Sơn 30' (pen.); Vũ Minh Hiếu 70'	Report	Perera 17'; Suriya 65'	Stadium: Thống Nhất Stadium

5 November AFF Cup GS	Vietnam	0–0	Malaysia	Songkhla, Thailand
19:00				Stadium: Tinsulanon Stadium; Referee: Hanlumyaung Panya (Thailand)

7 November AFF Cup GS	Cambodia	0–6	Vietnam	Songkhla, Thailand
19:30			Lê Huỳnh Đức 16', 80'; Nguyễn Văn Sỹ 55'; Nguyễn Hồng Sơn 58'; Vũ Công Tuyền 74', 86'	Stadium: Tinsulanon Stadium; Referee: Hidayat Jajat Sudrajat (Indonesia)

11 November AFF Cup GS	Vietnam	1–0	Singapore	Songkhla, Thailand
19:30	Lê Huỳnh Đức 62'			Stadium: Tinsulanon Stadium; Referee: Hanlumyaung Panya (Thailand)

13 November AFF Cup GS	Laos	0–5	Vietnam	Songkhla, Thailand
19:00			Văn Sỹ Thủy 8'; Vũ Công Tuyền 18'; Nguyễn Văn Sỹ 50'; Vũ Minh Hiếu 61'; Phạm Hùng Dũng 88'	Stadium: Tinsulanon Stadium; Referee: Hanlumyaung Panya (Thailand)

16 November AFF Cup SF	Vietnam	2–3 (a.e.t.)	Indonesia	Bangkok, Thailand
16:00	Nguyễn Hồng Sơn 45'; Vũ Công Tuyền 90'		Christiawan 39' 120'; Nurdiantoro 75'	Stadium: Rajamangala Stadium; Referee: S. Kumbalingam Kennedy (Singapore)

18 November AFF Cup 3rd place	Vietnam	0–3	Malaysia	Bangkok, Thailand
16:00			Talib 42'; Suparman 59', 90'	Stadium: Rajamangala Stadium; Referee: Hanlumyaung Panya (Thailand)

==== 2001 ====
8 February World Cup qualifier R1	Vietnam	0–0	Bangladesh	Dammam, Saudi Arabia
18:30		Report		Stadium: Prince Mohamed bin Fahd Stadium; Attendance: 3,099; Referee: Abdullah Al-Harrasi (Oman)

10 February World Cup qualifier R1	Mongolia	0–1	Vietnam	Dammam, Saudi Arabia
18:30		Report	Nguyễn Hồng Sơn 45' (pen.)	Stadium: Prince Mohamed bin Fahd Stadium; Attendance: 1,000; Referee: Ibrahim Abu Elaish (Palestine)

12 February World Cup qualifier R1	Saudi Arabia	5–0	Vietnam	Dammam, Saudi Arabia
20:30	Al-Meshal 17', 88'; Al-Jaber 29', 70', 90'	Report		Stadium: Prince Mohamed bin Fahd Stadium; Attendance: 3,000; Referee: Jaafaar Mahdi Al-Khabbaz (Bahrain)

15 February World Cup qualifier R1	Bangladesh	0–4	Vietnam	Dammam, Saudi Arabia
20:30		Report	Nguyễn Văn Sỹ 65'; Nguyễn Hồng Sơn 73', 87' (pen.); Nguyễn Trung Vĩnh 77'	Stadium: Prince Mohamed bin Fahd Stadium; Attendance: 3,000; Referee: Saeed Bathaei Naeeni (Iran)

17 February World Cup qualifier R1	Vietnam	4–0	Mongolia	Dammam, Saudi Arabia
18:30	Nguyễn Lương Phúc 3', 87'; Nguyễn Hồng Sơn 15', 21'	Report		Stadium: Prince Mohamed bin Fahd Stadium; Attendance: 1,000; Referee: Fareed Al-Marzouqi (United Arab Emirates)

19 February World Cup qualifier R1	Vietnam	0–4	Saudi Arabia	Dammam, Saudi Arabia
20:30		Report	Al-Meshal 31', 71', 79'; Al-Dosari 88'	Stadium: Prince Mohamed bin Fahd Stadium; Attendance: 8,000; Referee: Salem Mujghef (Jordan)

==== 2002 ====
27 November Friendly	Sri Lanka	1–2	Vietnam	Colombo, Sri Lanka
	80'	Report	Nguyễn Minh Phương 32'; Nguyễn Đức Thắng 62'	Stadium: Sugathadasa Stadium

29 November Friendly	Sri Lanka	1–1	Vietnam	Colombo, Sri Lanka
	90+2'	Report	Trịnh Xuân Thành 50'	Stadium: Sugathadasa Stadium

1 December Friendly	Sri Lanka	2–2	Vietnam	Colombo, Sri Lanka
	74'; 80'	Report	Phan Văn Tài Em 3'; Lê Huỳnh Đức 65'	Stadium: Sugathadasa Stadium

8 December Friendly	Thailand	2–1	Vietnam	Bangkok, Thailand
	Therdsak 18' (pen.), 49'	Report	Huỳnh Hồng Sơn 14'	Stadium: Suphachalasai Stadium

15 December AFF Cup GS	Vietnam	9–2	Cambodia	Jakarta, Indonesia
19:35	Huỳnh Hồng Sơn 11'; Trần Trường Giang 16', 40'; Nguyễn Quốc Trung 24'; Lê Huỳnh Đức 63', 80'; Nguyễn Minh Phương 75'; Trịnh Xuân Thành 88'; Phạm Văn Quyến 90'		Sochetra 30'; Kanyanith 58'	Stadium: Gelora Bung Karno Stadium; Referee: Santhan Nagalingham (Singapore)

19 December AFF Cup GS	Vietnam	4–1	Philippines	Jakarta, Indonesia
18:35	Huỳnh Hồng Sơn 60', 72'; Lê Huỳnh Đức 68' (pen.), 79'		Cañedo 71'	Stadium: Gelora Bung Karno Stadium; Referee: Santhan Nagalingham (Singapore)

21 December AFF Cup GS	Indonesia	2–2	Vietnam	Jakarta, Indonesia
18:35	Budi 12'; Zaenal 83'		Phan Văn Tài Em 53'; Lê Huỳnh Đức 59'	Stadium: Gelora Bung Karno Stadium; Attendance: 30,000; Referee: Subkhiddin Mohd Salleh (Malaysia)

23 December AFF Cup GS	Myanmar	2–4	Vietnam	Jakarta, Indonesia
18:35	Lwin Oo 30'; Htay Aung 80'		Trịnh Xuân Thành 38'; Đặng Phương Nam 48', 66'; Lê Huỳnh Đức 72' (pen.)	Stadium: Lebak Bulus Stadium; Referee: Santhan Nagalingham (Singapore)

27 December AFF Cup SF	Vietnam	0–4	Thailand	Jakarta, Indonesia
16:00			Woorawoot 24'; Narongchai 42'; Manit 75'; Sakda 90'	Stadium: Gelora Bung Karno Stadium; Referee: Santhan Nagalingham (Singapore)

29 December AFF Cup 3rd place	Vietnam	2–1	Malaysia	Jakarta, Indonesia
16:00	Trần Trường Giang 45'; Nguyễn Minh Phương 59'		Indra 55'	Stadium: Gelora Bung Karno Stadium; Referee: Setiyono Midi (Indonesia)

==== 2003 ====
12 February Friendly	Albania	5–0	Vietnam	Bastia Umbra, Italy
	Bushi 16'; Myrtaj 21', 38'; Dragusha 53'; Pinari 86'	Report		Stadium: Stadio Comunale; Attendance: 100; Referee: Nicola Nicoletti (Italy)

25 September Asian Cup qualifier	Vietnam	0–5	South Korea	Incheon, South Korea
			Lee Ki-hyung 35'; Cho Jae-jin 49'; Kim Do-hoon 68'; Kim Dae-eui 72'; Woo Sung-yong 86'	Stadium: Munhak Stadium; Attendance: 14,327; Referee: Subash Anthony Lazar (Singapore)

27 September Asian Cup qualifier	Vietnam	5–0	Nepal	Daegu, South Korea
	Phạm Văn Quyến 14', 23', 36'; Nguyễn Tuấn Phong 22'; Phan Thanh Bình 90'			Stadium: Daegu World Cup Stadium

29 September Asian Cup qualifier	Oman	6–0	Vietnam	Daegu, South Korea
	Bashir 15', 43'; Al-Dhabit 16', 27'; Al-Mukhaini 20'; Al-Hinai 87'			Stadium: Daegu World Cup Stadium

19 October Asian Cup qualifier	South Korea	0–1	Vietnam	Muscat, Oman
			Phạm Văn Quyến 74'	Stadium: Sultan Qaboos Sports Complex; Attendance: 25,000; Referee: Panya Hanlumyaung (Thailand)

21 October Asian Cup qualifier	Nepal	0–2	Vietnam	Muscat, Oman
			Nguyễn Minh Phương 49'; Phan Thanh Bình 50'	Stadium: Royal Oman Police Stadium

24 October Asian Cup qualifier	Vietnam	0–1	Oman	Muscat, Oman
			Al-Dhabit 47'; A.H. Al-Mukhaini 68'	Stadium: Sultan Qaboos Sports Complex

==== 2004 ====
18 February World Cup qualifier R2	Vietnam	4–0	Maldives	Hanoi, Vietnam
19:00	Phan Văn Tài Em 9', 60'; Nguyễn Minh Hải 13'; Phạm Văn Quyến 80' (pen.)	Report		Stadium: Mỹ Đình National Stadium; Attendance: 25,000; Referee: Fong Yau Fat Jame (Hong Kong)

31 March World Cup qualifier R2	Vietnam	0–2	Lebanon	Nam Định, Vietnam
19:00		Report	R. Antar 83'; Hamieh 88'	Stadium: Chùa Cuối Stadium; Attendance: 25,000; Referee: Ravshan Irmatov (Uzbekistan)

9 June World Cup qualifier R2	South Korea	2–0	Vietnam	Daejon, South Korea
19:00	Ahn Jung-hwan 29'; Kim Do-heon 61'	Report		Stadium: Daejeon World Cup Stadium; Attendance: 40,019; Referee: Omer Al Mehannah (Saudi Arabia)

20 August LG Cup	Vietnam	5–0	Myanmar	Ho Chi Minh City, Vietnam
19:00	Lê Công Vinh 32' (pen.), 90'; Thạch Bảo Khanh 45'; Nguyễn Minh Phương 70'; Phạm Văn Quyến 80'	Report		Stadium: Thống Nhất Stadium

24 August LG Cup	Vietnam	2–1	India	Ho Chi Minh City, Vietnam
19:00	Lê Công Vinh 21'; Thạch Bảo Khanh 57'	Report	Lawrence 87'	Stadium: Thống Nhất Stadium

8 September World Cup qualifier R2	Vietnam	1–2	South Korea	Ho Chi Minh City, Vietnam
17:00	Phan Văn Tài Em 49'	Report	Lee Dong-gook 63'; Lee Chun-soo 76'	Stadium: Thống Nhất Stadium; Attendance: 25,000; Referee: Toshimitsu Yoshida (Japan)

13 October World Cup qualifier R2	Maldives	3–0	Vietnam	Malé, Maldives
15:45	Thariq 29'; Ashfaq 68', 85'	Report		Stadium: Rasmee Dhandu Stadium; Attendance: 10,000; Referee: Rizwan Haq (India)

17 November World Cup qualifier R2	Lebanon	0–0	Vietnam	Beirut, Lebanon
18:00		Report		Stadium: Beirut Municipal Stadium; Attendance: 1,000; Referee: Abdulhameed Ebrahim (Bahrain)

7 December AFF Cup GS	Vietnam	1–1	Singapore	Ho Chi Minh City, Vietnam
19:30	Thạch Bảo Khanh 51'		Indra 70'	Stadium: Thống Nhất Stadium; Referee: Sun Baojie (China)

9 December AFF Cup GS	Vietnam	9–1	Cambodia	Ho Chi Minh City, Vietnam
17:00	Thạch Bảo Khanh 9', 23'; Lê Công Vinh 57', 87', 89'; Sampratna 63' (o.g.); Đặng Văn Thành 71', 83'; Nguyễn Huy Hoàng 77'		Sokunthea 44'	Stadium: Thống Nhất Stadium; Referee: Ahmad Khalidi Supian (Malaysia)

11 December AFF Cup GS	Vietnam	0–3	Indonesia	Hanoi, Vietnam
19:30			Mauly 18'; Boaz 21'; Ilham 45'	Stadium: Mỹ Đình National Stadium; Referee: Abdulhameed Ebrahim (Bahrain)

15 December AFF Cup GS	Vietnam	3–0	Laos	Ho Chi Minh City, Vietnam
18:00	Lê Công Vinh 10'; Nguyễn Minh Phương 42'; Thạch Bảo Khanh 75'			Stadium: Thống Nhất Stadium; Referee: Rungklay Mongkol (Thailand)

==== 2006 ====
24 December King's Cup	Thailand	2–1	Vietnam	Bangkok, Thailand
19:15	Sarayuth 36'; Thonglao 61'		Phan Thanh Bình 35'	Stadium: Suphachalasai Stadium

26 December King's Cup	Vietnam	2–1	Kazakhstan	Bangkok, Thailand
16:30	Lê Hồng Minh 21'; Lê Công Vinh 90'		Finonchenko 57'	Stadium: Suphachalasai Stadium

28 December King's Cup	Singapore	2–3	Vietnam	Bangkok, Thailand
16:30	Bennett 14'; Fazrul 62'		Phan Thanh Bình 7'; Lê Tấn Tài 53'; Lê Công Vinh 82'	Stadium: Suphachalasai Stadium

30 December King's Cup F	Thailand	3–1	Vietnam	Bangkok, Thailand
18:00	Sutee 38'; Pipat 41'; Suchao 58'		Phan Thanh Bình 68'	Stadium: Suphachalasai Stadium

==== 2007 ====
13 January AFF Cup GS	Singapore	0–0	Vietnam	Kallang, Singapore
20:00		Report		Stadium: Singapore National Stadium; Attendance: 20,000; Referee: Chanwalit Sananwai (Thailand)

15 January AFF Cup GS	Indonesia	1–1	Vietnam	Kallang, Singapore
17:30	Saktiawan 90'	Report	Supardi 35' (o.g.)	Stadium: Singapore National Stadium; Attendance: 4,500; Referee: Mohamed Shahbuddin (Brunei)

17 January AFF Cup GS	Vietnam	9–0	Laos	Kallang, Singapore
20:00	Lê Công Vinh 1', 28', 58'; Phan Thanh Bình 29', 73' (pen.), 81', 84'; Nguyễn Văn Biển 45', 90'	Report		Stadium: Jalan Besar Stadium; Attendance: 1,005; Referee: Chanwalit Sananwai (Thailand)

24 January AFF Cup SF	Vietnam	0–2	Thailand	Hanoi, Vietnam
19:00		Report	Thonglao 28'; Pipat 81'	Stadium: Mỹ Đình National Stadium; Attendance: 40,000; Referee: Jimmy Napitupulu (Indonesia)

28 January AFF Cup SF	Thailand	0–0 (2–0 agg.)	Vietnam	Bangkok, Thailand
19:00		Report		Stadium: Suphachalasai Stadium; Attendance: 35,000; Referee: Suresh Srinivasan (India)

24 June Friendly	Vietnam	3–0	Jamaica	Hanoi, Vietnam
19:00	Lê Công Vinh 8'; Trần Đức Dương 65'; Nguyễn Anh Đức 90'	Report		Stadium: Mỹ Đình National Stadium

30 June Friendly	Vietnam	5–3	Bahrain	Hanoi, Vietnam
20:00	Lê Công Vinh 11', 17'; Mai Tiến Thành 53'; Phan Thanh Bình 79'; Nguyễn Anh Đức 87'	Report	Abdulrahman 3'; Hubail 62'; Okwunwanne 72'	Stadium: Mỹ Đình National Stadium

8 July Asian Cup GS	Vietnam	2–0	United Arab Emirates	Hanoi, Vietnam
19:30	Huỳnh Quang Thanh 64'; Lê Công Vinh 73'	Report		Stadium: Mỹ Đình National Stadium; Attendance: 39,450; Referee: Talaat Najm (Lebanon)

12 July Asian Cup GS	Qatar	1–1	Vietnam	Hanoi, Vietnam
19:30	Soria 79'	Report	Phan Thanh Bình 32'	Stadium: Mỹ Đình National Stadium; Attendance: 40,000; Referee: Masoud Moradi (Iran)

16 July Asian Cup GS	Vietnam	1–4	Japan	Hanoi, Vietnam
19:30	Suzuki 8' (o.g.)	Report	Maki 12', 59'; Endō 31'; S. Nakamura 53'	Stadium: Mỹ Đình National Stadium; Attendance: 40,000; Referee: Matthew Breeze (Australia)

21 July Asian Cup QF	Iraq	2–0	Vietnam	Bangkok, Thailand
20:15	Mahmoud 2', 65'	Report		Stadium: Rajamangala Stadium; Attendance: 9,720; Referee: Yuichi Nishimura (Japan)

8 October World Cup qualifier R1	Vietnam	0–1	United Arab Emirates	Hanoi, Vietnam
20:30		Report	Saeed 79'	Stadium: Mỹ Đình National Stadium; Attendance: 20,000; Referee: Yuichi Nishimura (Japan)

28 October World Cup qualifier R1	United Arab Emirates	5–0 (6–0 agg.)	Vietnam	Abu Dhabi, United Arab Emirates
19:00	Matar 13'; Al-Mahri 40'; Al-Shehhi 53'; Mubarak 90'; Al-Kas 90+4' (pen.)	Report		Stadium: Al Jazira Mohammed Bin Zayed Stadium; Attendance: 12,000; Referee: Subkhiddin Mohd Salleh (Malaysia)

==== 2008 ====
7 June Friendly	Guatemala	Cancelled	Vietnam	Los Angeles, United States
				Stadium: Los Angeles Memorial Coliseum
Note: The match was originally scheduled as part of the 3-teams tournament between Guatemala, Vietnam and a football club from Mexico or United States. However, the tournament organisers failed to invite the third team, which resulted in the cancellation of this game.

11 June Friendly	Indonesia	1–0	Vietnam	Surabaya, Indonesia
	Bambang 12' (pen.)	Report		Stadium: Gelora 10 November Stadium

1 October Ho Chi Minh City Cup	Vietnam	2–3	Myanmar	Ho Chi Minh City, Vietnam
	Lê Công Vinh 65', 90+3'	Report	Tun Tun Win 14'; Yan Paing 69'; Kyaw Thi Ha 90'	Stadium: Thống Nhất Stadium

5 October Ho Chi Minh City Cup	Vietnam	2–3	Turkmenistan	Ho Chi Minh City, Vietnam
	Nguyễn Minh Phương 16'; Lê Công Vinh 90'	Report	Şamyradow 17'; Garadanow 81'; Mirzoyew 86'	Stadium: Thống Nhất Stadium

14 October Friendly	Vietnam	0–0	Singapore	Hanoi, Vietnam
		Report		Stadium: Mỹ Đình National Stadium

30 October T&T Cup	North Korea	0–0	Vietnam	Hanoi, Vietnam
19:00		Report		Stadium: Mỹ Đình National Stadium

16 November T&T Cup	Vietnam	2–2	Thailand	Hanoi, Vietnam
19:00	Nguyễn Việt Thắng 52'; Nguyễn Minh Phương 88'	Report	Teerathep 33'; Dangda 82'	Stadium: Mỹ Đình National Stadium

26 November Friendly	Singapore	2–2 (5–4 p)	Vietnam	Jurong, Singapore
	Wilkinson 40'; Casmir 54'	Report	Lê Công Vinh 42' (pen.); Phan Văn Tài Em 90'	Stadium: Jurong Stadium

6 December AFF Cup GS	Thailand	2–0	Vietnam	Phuket, Thailand
19:30	Sutee 34'; Suchao 45+4'	Report		Stadium: Surakul Stadium; Attendance: 20,000; Referee: Malik Abdul Bashir (Singapore)

8 December AFF Cup GS	Malaysia	2–3	Vietnam	Phuket, Thailand
17:00	Indra Putra 20', 85'	Report	Phạm Thành Lương 16'; Nguyễn Vũ Phong 72', 86'	Stadium: Surakul Stadium; Referee: Pandian Palaniyandi (Singapore)

10 December AFF Cup GS	Vietnam	4–0	Laos	Phuket, Thailand
19:30	Nguyễn Việt Thắng 48'; Phạm Thành Lương 63'; Huỳnh Quang Thanh 66'; Phan Thanh Bình 80'	Report		Stadium: Surakul Stadium; Referee: Win Cho (Myanmar)

17 December AFF Cup SF	Vietnam	0–0	Singapore	Hanoi, Vietnam
19:00		Report		Stadium: Mỹ Đình National Stadium; Attendance: 40,000; Referee: Ramachandran Krishnan (Malaysia)

21 December AFF Cup SF	Singapore	0–1 (0–1 agg.)	Vietnam	Kallang, Singapore
20:00		Report	Nguyễn Quang Hải 74'	Stadium: Singapore National Stadium; Attendance: 55,000; Referee: Subkhiddin Mohd Salleh (Malaysia)

24 December AFF Cup F	Thailand	1–2	Vietnam	Bangkok, Thailand
19:00	Dương Hồng Sơn 75' (o.g.)	Report	Nguyễn Vũ Phong 40'; Lê Công Vinh 42'	Stadium: Rajamangala Stadium; Attendance: 50,000; Referee: Ramachandran Krishnan (Malaysia)

29 December AFF Cup F	Vietnam	1–1 (3–2 agg.)	Thailand	Hanoi, Vietnam
19:00	Lê Công Vinh 90+4'	Report	Dangda 21'	Stadium: Mỹ Đình National Stadium; Attendance: 40,000; Referee: Malik Abdul Bashir (Singapore)

==== 2009 ====
14 January Asian Cup qualifier	Vietnam	3–1	Lebanon	Hanoi, Vietnam
19:00	Nguyễn Minh Phương 12'; Lê Công Vinh 30'; Nguyễn Vũ Phong 70'	Report	Moghrabi 75'	Stadium: Mỹ Đình National Stadium; Attendance: 13,000; Referee: Masaaki Iemoto (Japan)

28 January Asian Cup qualifier	China	6–1	Vietnam	Hangzhou, China
19:35	Gao Lin 2', 20', 84'; Du Wei 27'; Jiang Ning 37'; Hao Junmin 47'	Report	Nguyễn Vũ Phong 11'	Stadium: Yellow Dragon Sports Centre; Attendance: 15,300; Referee: Kim Dong-Jin (Korea Republic)

31 May Friendly	Kuwait	0–1	Vietnam	Kuwait City, Kuwait
20:00		Report	Nguyễn Trọng Hoàng 36'	Stadium: Jaber Al-Ahmad International Stadium

20 October Ho Chi Minh City Cup	Vietnam	1–0	Turkmenistan	Ho Chi Minh City, Vietnam
18:15	Nguyễn Quang Hải 58'			Stadium: Thống Nhất Stadium

24 October Ho Chi Minh City Cup	Vietnam	2–2	Singapore	Ho Chi Minh City, Vietnam
18:15	Nguyễn Quang Hải 18'; Vũ Như Thành 83'	Report	Đurić 26'; Wilkinson 51'	Stadium: Thống Nhất Stadium

14 November Asian Cup qualifier	Vietnam	0–1	Syria	Hanoi, Vietnam
19:00		Report	Rafe 90+4'	Stadium: Mỹ Đình National Stadium; Attendance: 30,000; Referee: Ben Williams (Australia)

18 November Asian Cup qualifier	Syria	0–0	Vietnam	Aleppo, Syria
14:00		Report		Stadium: Aleppo International Stadium; Attendance: 19,000; Referee: Abdullah Al Hilali (Oman)

== Head-to-head records ==
Vietnam national football team head-to-head records (1983–2009)
Opponents	Pld	W	D	L	GF	GA	GD	Pts	Confederation
Albania	1	0	0	1	0	5	-5	0	UEFA
Bahrain	1	1	0	0	5	3	+2	3	AFC
Bangladesh	2	1	1	0	4	0	+4	4	AFC
Bosnia and Herzegovina	1	0	0	1	0	4	-4	0	UEFA
Cambodia	7	6	1	0	31	4	+27	19	AFC
China	5	0	0	5	3	19	-16	0	AFC
Chinese Taipei	4	3	1	0	11	4	+7	10	AFC
Curaçao	1	0	1	0	1	1	0	1	CONCACAF
Estonia	1	1	0	0	1	0	+1	3	UEFA
Guam	2	2	0	0	20	0	+20	6	AFC
Hong Kong	1	0	1	0	1	1	±0	1	AFC
India	2	1	0	0	2	1	+1	3	AFC
Indonesia	15	4	4	7	16	20	-4	16	AFC
Iran	1	0	1	0	2	2	±0	1	AFC
Iraq	1	0	0	1	0	2	-2	0	AFC
Jamaica	1	1	0	0	3	0	+3	3	CONCACAF
Japan	1	0	0	1	1	4	-3	0	AFC
Kazakhstan	1	1	0	0	2	1	+1	3	UEFA
Kuwait	1	1	0	0	1	0	+1	3	AFC
Laos	8	7	1	0	37	3	+44	31	AFC
Lebanon	3	1	1	1	3	4	-1	4	AFC
Malaysia	7	4	1	3	9	9	±0	13	AFC
Maldives	2	1	0	1	4	3	+1	3	AFC
Mongolia	2	2	0	0	5	0	+5	6	AFC
Myanmar	7	5	1	1	17	4	+13	16	AFC
Nepal	2	2	0	0	7	0	+7	6	AFC
North Korea	4	0	1	2	0	4	-4	7	AFC
Oman	2	0	0	2	0	7	-7	0	AFC
Philippines	6	5	1	0	15	3	+12	16	AFC
Qatar	3	0	1	2	1	9	-8	1	AFC
Russia	1	1	0	0	1	0	+1	3	UEFA
Saudi Arabia	2	0	0	2	0	9	-9	0	AFC
Singapore	15	5	6	4	12	13	–1	21	AFC
South Korea	6	1	0	5	2	17	-15	3	AFC
Sri Lanka	4	1	3	0	7	6	+1	6	AFC
Syria	2	0	1	1	0	1	–1	1	AFC
Tajikistan	2	0	0	2	0	8	-8	0	AFC
Thailand	17	3	4	10	15	34	–19	13	AFC
Turkmenistan	5	1	0	4	4	11	-7	3	AFC
United Arab Emirates	3	1	0	2	2	6	-3	3	AFC
Zimbabwe	1	0	0	1	0	6	–6	0	AFC
