= Football at the 1995 SEA Games =

Tournament details
- Host country: Thailand
- Dates: 4–16 December
- Teams: 10
- Venues: 3 (in 2 host cities)

Final positions
- Champions: Thailand (7th title)
- Runners-up: Vietnam
- Third place: Singapore
- Fourth place: Myanmar

Tournament statistics
- Matches played: 24
- Goals scored: 77 (3.21 per match)

The football tournament at the 1995 SEA Games was held from 4 to 16 December in Chiang Mai and Lamphun in Thailand. All 10 Southeast Asian nations joined the football tournament.

== Venues ==
Chiang Mai		Lamphun
700th Anniversary Stadium	San Pa Tong District Stadium	Lamphun Province Stadium
Capacity: 25,000	Capacity: Unknown	Capacity: 5,000
Football at the 1995 SEA Games is located in Thailand

== Medal winners ==
Division	Gold	Silver	Bronze
Men's Division	Thailand	Vietnam	Singapore
Women's Division	Thailand	Malaysia	Myanmar

Event	Gold	Silver	Bronze
Men's football	Thailand; Natipong Sritong-In; Vitoon Kijmongkolsak; Tawan Sripan; Cherdchai Suwannang; Chukiat Noosarung; Kritsada Piandit; Kiatisuk Senamuang; Pattanapong Sripramote; Jakarat Tonhongsa; Sirisak Kadaeri; Natee Thongsookkaew; Sanor Longsawang; Phanuwat Yinphan	Vietnam; Võ Hoàng Bửu; Nguyễn Hữu Đang; Huỳnh Quốc Cường; Trần Minh Chiến; Nguyễn Hồng Sơn; Lư Đình Tuấn; Nguyễn Mạnh Cường; Nguyễn Hữu Thắng; Đỗ Khải; Hoàng Anh Dũng; Trần Công Minh; Nguyễn Chí Bảo; Lê Đức Anh Tuấn; Trịnh Tấn Thành; Nguyễn Liêm Thanh; Lê Huỳnh Đức; Nguyễn Văn Cường; Trần Quan Huy; Trần Thanh Nhạc	Singapore; Fandi Ahmad; V. Selvaraj; Zulkarnaen Zainal; Rafi Ali; Borhan Abu Samah; Malek Awab; Nazri Nasir; Lee Man Hon; Samawira Basri; Zakaria Awang; Mahar David

== Men's tournament ==
=== Participants ===
- Brunei
- Cambodia
- Indonesia
- Laos
- Malaysia
- Myanmar
- Philippines
- Singapore
- Thailand
- Vietnam

=== Squad ===
Football at the 1995 Southeast Asian Games – Men's team squads

=== Group stage ===
==== Group A ====
Team	Pld	W	D	L	GF	GA	GD	Pts
Thailand	4	3	1	0	14	2	+10	10
Vietnam	4	3	0	1	8	3	+5	9
Indonesia	4	2	0	2	14	3	+11	6
Malaysia	4	1	1	2	9	5	+4	4
Cambodia	4	0	0	4	0	32	−32	0

4 December 1995

Thailand	2–1	Indonesia
Surachai 30'; Netipong 67'	Report	Fachri 33'

700th Anniversary Stadium, Chiang Mai
Attendance: 20.000
4 December 1995

Vietnam	2–0	Malaysia
Huỳnh Quốc Cường 55'; Võ Hoàng Bửu 83' (pen.)	Report

700th Anniversary Stadium, Chiang Mai

6 December 1995

Thailand	0–0	Malaysia
	Report

700th Anniversary Stadium, Chiang Mai
6 December 1995

Indonesia	10–0	Cambodia
Irianto; Kurniawan; Widodo Putro; Lubis; Nugroho

700th Anniversary Stadium, Chiang Mai

8 December 1995

Vietnam	4–0	Cambodia
Nguyễn Hồng Sơn 20', 55'; Nguyễn Hữu Đang 47'; Huỳnh Quốc Cường 82'

Lamphun Province Stadium, Lamphun
8 December 1995

Indonesia	3–0	Malaysia
Irianto 35'; Husaini 48', 55'	Report

700th Anniversary Stadium, Chiang Mai

10 December 1995

Thailand	3–1	Vietnam
Netipong 2', 69'; Tawan 44'		Nguyễn Hữu Đang 67'

700th Anniversary Stadium, Chiang Mai
Attendance: 20,000
Referee: Khin Maung Thein (Myanmar)
10 December 1995

Malaysia	9–0	Cambodia
Anuar 6', 22', 70'; Dollah 17', 62' (pen.), 67'; Zainal 44'; Affendi 60'; Seng Kong 80'	Report

Lamphun Province Stadium, Lamphun
Referee: Tamat Haji Budin (Brunei)

12 December 1995

Thailand	9–0	Cambodia
Vitoon; Kiatisuk; Cherdchai; Netipong; Chukiat

700th Anniversary Stadium, Chiang Mai
12 December 1995

Vietnam	1–0	Indonesia
Nguyễn Hữu Đang

Lamphun Province Stadium, Lamphun

==== Group B ====
Team	Pld	W	D	L	GF	GA	GD	Pts
Myanmar	4	3	0	1	9	5	+4	9
Singapore	4	2	2	0	10	4	+6	8
Laos	4	2	1	1	4	1	+3	7
Philippines	4	1	0	3	2	9	−7	3
Brunei	4	0	1	3	2	8	−6	1

4 December 1995

Singapore	2–2	Brunei
Fandi Ahmad 12'; Zulkarnaen Zainal 70'	Report	Suni 41'; Said 51'

Lamphun Province Stadium, Lamphun
4 December 1995

Myanmar	4–1	Philippines
Go Ku 3', 23'; Myo Hlaing Win 29'; Kyaw Noo Ra 70'		Rosell 78'

Lamphun Province Stadium, Lamphun

6 December 1995

Singapore	4–2	Myanmar
Vengadasalam Selvaraj 11' 22'; Fandi Ahmad 13' 44'	Report	Myo Hlaing Win 8' 46'

Lamphun Province Stadium, Lamphun
Attendance: 5,000
6 December 1995

Laos	1–0	Philippines
Maicompiuto

Lamphun Province Stadium, Lamphun

8 December 1995

Singapore	4–0	Philippines
Rafi Ali 1' 6'; Vengadasalam Selvaraj 8'; Fandi Ahmad 30'

700th Anniversary Stadium, Chiang Mai
8 December 1995

Laos	3–0	Brunei
Luang; Auxaynoma; Sinahoukiena

Lamphun Province Stadium, Lamphun

10 December 1995

Singapore	0–0	Laos

Lamphun Province Stadium, Lamphun
10 December 1995

Myanmar	2–0	Brunei
Maung Maung Htay

700th Anniversary Stadium, Chiang Mai

12 December 1995

Philippines	1–0	Brunei
Rosell (?)

Lamphun Province Stadium, Lamphun
12 December 1995

Myanmar	1–0	Laos
Kyi Lwin

700th Anniversary Stadium, Chiang Mai

=== Knockout stage ===
Semi-finals
14 December
Thailand	1
Singapore	0
14 December
Vietnam (g.g.)	2
Myanmar	1

Final
16 December
Thailand	4
Vietnam	0
Third place
16 December
Singapore	1
Myanmar	0

==== Semi-finals ====
14 December 1995

Thailand	1–0	Singapore
Kritsada

700th Anniversary Stadium, Chiang Mai
Attendance: 25,000

14 December 1995

Vietnam	2–1 (a.e.t.)	Myanmar
Lê Huỳnh Đức 15'; Trần Minh Chiến 95'		Myo Hlaing Win 7'

700th Anniversary Stadium, Chiang Mai

==== Bronze medal match ====
16 December 1995

Singapore	1–0	Myanmar
Fandi Ahmad 41'

700th Anniversary Stadium, Chiang Mai

==== Gold medal match ====
16 December 1995

Thailand	4–0	Vietnam
Tawan; Natipong

700th Anniversary Stadium, Chiang Mai
Attendance: 22,000
Referee: Kahairil Agil (Indonesia)

=== Winners ===
1995 SEA Games Men's Tournament

Thailand
Seventh title

=== Final ranking ===
Pos	Team	Pld	W	D	L	GF	GA	GD	Pts	Final result
1	Thailand (H)	6	5	1	0	19	2	+17	16	Gold Medal
2	Vietnam	6	4	0	2	10	8	+2	12	Silver Medal
3	Singapore	6	3	2	1	11	5	+6	11	Bronze Medal
4	Myanmar	6	3	0	3	10	8	+2	9	Fourth place
5	Laos	4	2	1	1	4	1	+3	7	Eliminated in group stage
6	Indonesia	4	2	0	2	14	3	+11	6	Eliminated in group stage
7	Malaysia	4	1	1	2	9	5	+4	4	Eliminated in group stage
8	Philippines	4	1	0	3	2	9	−7	3	Eliminated in group stage
9	Brunei	4	0	1	3	2	8	−6	1	Eliminated in group stage
10	Cambodia	4	0	0	4	0	32	−32	0	Eliminated in group stage

(H) Hosts

== Women's tournament ==
=== Participants ===
- Malaysia
- Myanmar
- Philippines
- Singapore
- Thailand

=== Group stage ===
Team	Pld	W	D	L	GF	GA	GD	Pts
Thailand	4	3	1	0	15	3	+12	10
Malaysia	4	2	1	1	7	4	+3	7
Myanmar	4	1	2	1	8	9	−1	5
Philippines	4	1	2	1	3	9	−6	5
Singapore	4	0	0	4	1	9	−8	0

3 December 1995

Thailand	1–0	Malaysia
? 18'

San Pa Tong District Stadium, Chiang Mai
3 December 1995

Philippines	2–1	Singapore

San Pa Tong District Stadium, Chiang Mai

5 December 1995

Thailand	4–0	Singapore

San Pa Tong District Stadium, Chiang Mai
5 December 1995

Myanmar	1–1	Philippines

San Pa Tong District Stadium, Chiang Mai

7 December 1995

Malaysia	5–3	Myanmar
Abdul 14', 61'; Yaw 54'; Lansiew 57'; Ahing 78'		San San Kyu 40'; Yin Moe Aye 50', 85'

San Pa Tong District Stadium, Chiang Mai
7 December 1995

Thailand	7–0	Philippines

San Pa Tong District Stadium, Chiang Mai

9 December 1995

Malaysia	2–0	Singapore
Yaw 13'; Lansiew 55'

San Pa Tong District Stadium, Chiang Mai
9 December 1995

Myanmar	3–3	Thailand

San Pa Tong District Stadium, Chiang Mai

11 December 1995

Malaysia	0–0	Philippines

700th Anniversary Stadium, Chiang Mai
11 December 1995

Myanmar	1–0	Singapore

700th Anniversary Stadium, Chiang Mai

=== Final ===
13 December 1995

Thailand	1–0	Malaysia
Nongyao 18'

700th Anniversary Stadium, Chiang Mai

=== Winners ===
1995 SEA Games Women's Tournament

Thailand
Second title

=== Final ranking ===
Pos	Team	Pld	W	D	L	GF	GA	GD	Pts	Final Result
1	Thailand (H)	5	4	1	0	16	3	+13	13	Gold Medal
2	Malaysia	5	2	1	2	7	5	+2	7	Silver Medal
3	Myanmar	4	1	2	1	8	9	−1	5	Bronze Medal
4	Philippines	4	1	2	1	3	9	−6	5	
5	Singapore	4	0	0	4	1	9	−8	0	

(H) Hosts
