= Bejo Sugiantoro =

Indonesian footballer (1977–2025)

Personal information
- Date of birth: 2 April 1977
- Place of birth: Sidoarjo, Indonesia
- Date of death: 25 February 2025 (aged 47)
- Place of death: Surabaya, Indonesia
- Height: 1.76 m (5 ft 9 in)
- Position: Centre-back

Youth career
- 1993–1994: PSSI Primavera

Senior career*
Years	Team	Apps	(Gls)
1994–2003	Persebaya Surabaya	138	(2)
2003–2004	PSPS Pekanbaru	22	(0)
2004–2008	Persebaya Surabaya	69	(1)
2008–2009	Mitra Kukar	11	(1)
2009–2010	Persidafon Dafonsoro	25	(1)
2010–2011	Deltras Sidoarjo	25	(2)
2011–2012	Persidafon Dafonsoro	25	(0)
2012–2013	Perseba Bangkalan	21	(0)
Total		336	(7)

International career
1997–2004	Indonesia	45	(2)

Managerial career
- 2017: Persik Kediri
- 2018–2023: Persebaya Surabaya (assistant coach)
- 2019: Persebaya Surabaya (caretaker)
- 2023–2024: Serpong City
- 2024–2025: Deltras
- * Club domestic league appearances and goals

Bejo Sugiantoro (2 April 1977 – 25 February 2025) was an Indonesian footballer. He played as a defender, either as a libero or central defender. He was also a coach. Together with Kurniawan Dwi Yulianto, Anang Ma'ruf, Bima Sakti, and others he joined the PSSI Primavera program at Italy in the mid-1990s.

Bejo made 45 appearances for the Indonesia national team from 1997 to 2004.

== Club career ==
=== Persebaya ===
Bejo joined Persebaya Surabaya at the age of seventeen.

=== PS Mitra Kutai Kartanegara ===
In late December 2008, Bejo agreed a deal to sign for Mitra Kukar.

== Death ==
Bejo died from a heart attack in Surabaya, on 25 February 2025, at the age of 47.

== Career statistics ==
No.	Date	Venue	Opponent	Score	Result	Competition
1.	23 December 2002	Gelora Bung Karno Stadium, Jakarta, Indonesia	Philippines	8–0	13–1	2002 Tiger Cup
2.	23 December 2002	Gelora Bung Karno Stadium, Jakarta, Indonesia	Philippines	10–1	13–1	2002 Tiger Cup

== Honours ==
Persebaya Surabaya

- Liga Indonesia Premier Division: 1996–97, 2004; runner up: 1998–99
- Liga Indonesia First Division: 2006

Indonesia

- Indonesian Independence Cup: 2000
- AFF Championship runner-up: 2000, 2002; third place: 1998
- SEA Games silver medal: 1997; bronze medal: 1999
