= Myanmar v Vietnam (1995 SEA Games) =

Myanmar vs Vietnam (1995)
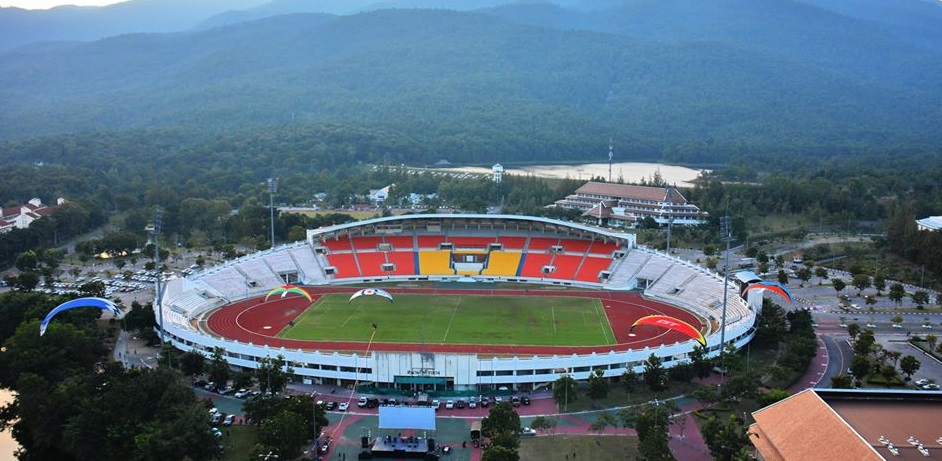
- 700th Anniversary Stadium in Chiang Mai, Thailand, where the match was held.
- Event: Football at the 1995 SEA Games; Semi-finals round
Myanmar	Vietnam
(Myanmar)	(Vietnam)
1	2
- Vietnam won thanks to the golden goal in overtime.
- Date: 14 December 1995; 30 years ago
- Venue: 700th Anniversary Stadium, Chiang Mai, Thailand
- Referee: Pirom Un-Prasert (Thailand)

On December 14, 1995, the Myanmar and Vietnam national football teams played the men's football semi-final match at the 1995 Southeast Asian Games, which took place at the 700th Anniversary Stadium in Chiang Mai, Thailand.

Before this match, Vietnam was considered to be the underdog against Myanmar because this was the first time the team had reached the semi-finals of a Southeast Asian regional football tournament since reintegrating into regional and world sports after the Đổi Mới reforms, while Myanmar was considered a strong team in the region at that time. However, Vietnam won a surprise victory with a score of 2–1 thanks to a golden goal by striker Trần Minh Chiến in extra time, to reach the gold medal match of the regional tournament for the first time since the country's reunification, although they later lost to Thailand.

This is one of the matches considered a turning point in the development of Vietnamese football in the later period, when the Vietnamese team continuously advanced and achieved high results in regional tournaments; as well as the position of the two football backgrounds of Vietnam and Myanmar reversed. From this match, the "Vietnamese Golden Ball" award was born to honor the contributions and achievements of Vietnamese football players during the year. The Vietnamese culture of "street storming" has gradually formed and spread every time the Vietnamese team wins regional and world football tournaments.

== Pre-match ==
Note: In all results below, the score of the semi-finalist team is given first.:

Myanmar		Round	Vietnam	
Opponent	Score	Group stage	Opponent	Score
Philippines	4–1	Match 1	Malaysia	2–0
Singapore	2–4	Match 2	Cambodia	4–0
Brunei	2–0	Match 3	Thailand	1–3
Laos	1–0	Match 4	Indonesia	1–0
First in Group B: Pos / Team / Pld / Pts; 1 / Myanmar / 4 / 9; 2 / Singapore / 4 / 8; 3 / Laos / 4 / 7; 4 / Philippines / 4 / 3; 5 / Brunei / 4 / 1; Source: 18th SEA GAMES 1995		Final standings	Second in Group A: Pos / Team / Pld / Pts; 1 / Thailand (H) / 4 / 10; 2 / Vietnam / 4 / 9; 3 / Indonesia / 4 / 6; 4 / Malaysia / 4 / 4; 5 / Cambodia / 4 / 0; Source: 18th SEA GAMES 1995 (H) Hosts	

The Myanmar national football team, formerly known as Burma, won gold medals in men's football at five consecutive Southeast Asian Games – then known as the SEAP Games – from 1965 to 1973, as well as gold medals in men's football at the 1966 and 1970 Asian Games. In the following years, Myanmar football declined but was still considered a strong team in Southeast Asia; they won a silver medal at the most recent SEA Games in 1993.

Before 1975, South Vietnam was one of the founding members of the Southeast Asian Peninsular Sports Federation, and participated in the SEAP Games continuously from 1959 to 1973. In men's football, the South Vietnam football team won the gold medal in 1959 and finished second twice in 1967 and 1973, both times losing to Burma. Vietnam officially unified the North and South after April 30, 1975, but due to the consequences of the war, the country did not attend the congress for a long time. After implementing Đổi Mới, a unified Vietnam reintegrated into Southeast Asian sports and participated in the first SEA Games in 1989. Also in 1989, the unified Vietnam Football Federation was re-established, and in 1991, the country's football team participated in the SEA Games for the first time at the 16th congress in the Philippines. (Note: Before 2001, men's football at the Southeast Asian Games was reserved for national teams. Since 2001, the regulation of only using players under 23 years old (U-23) to participate in the SEA Games has been applied to this sport, then reduced to U-22 from 2017.) The Vietnamese team at that time was considered capable of competing for medals, but internal instability caused the team to be eliminated from the group stage with one draw and two losses. Two years later, Vietnam continued to attend the 17th SEA Games in Singapore but was still eliminated from the group stage with only one win and two losses.

The Vietnamese team participated in the 1995 SEA Games under the guidance of German coach Karl-Heinz Weigang, while Dutch coach Ger Blok was the head coach of the Myanmar team at that time. In the group stage, the Vietnamese team finished second in Group A with three wins and one loss, in which a 1-0 victory in the final match against Indonesia helped Vietnam overcome their opponents to reach the semi-finals of the SEA Games for the first time since reintegration. As for the Myanmar team, they also had three wins and one loss but led Group B after the group stage ended.

The two teams have not met since Vietnam reintegrated into regional and world sports after Đổi Mới until before 1995. Before 1975, the South Vietnamese team had 13 matches against the Burmese team, winning two, drawing one and losing ten; while the North Vietnamese team had no matches against Burma. (Note: The World Football Elo Ratings website compiles statistics on the matches of the Republic of Vietnam national team before 1975 together with the achievements of the unified Vietnam national team (since 1991).) In 1995, the Vietnamese team was considered inferior to the Myanmar team; Vietnam's chances of winning were considered "almost non-existent".

== Match summary ==
Myanmar opened the scoring early, with Myo Hlaing Win scoring in the fifth minute of the match. However, less than 10 minutes later, Le Huynh Duc scored the equalizer 1-1 for the Vietnamese team after a face-off. In the 25th minute, goalkeeper Aung Kyaw received a red card for a rough foul on Huynh Duc, leaving Myanmar with only 10 men on the field; then reserve goalkeeper Zaw Win Naing came on to replace Maung Maung Oo. However, Myanmar still had the upper hand over the Vietnamese team; they created a number of chances but could not score. Five minutes before the end of the official match, Aye Naing had a rough tackle and received a straight red card, leaving Myanmar with only 9 men. The score remained 1-1 after 90 minutes of official play.

Entering extra time, Trần Minh Chiến, a player who had previously suffered a knee injury, was brought onto the field. In the 95th minute, after a quick free kick arrangement by Đỗ Khải and Nguyễn Hồng Sơn on the right wing, the ball was hung into the penalty area, Lê Huỳnh Đức missed the ball; then Trần Minh Chiến himself volleyed into the Myanmar net, scoring the golden goal to seal a 2-1 victory for Vietnam and this was the first time the golden goal rule was applied at a SEA Games.

December 14, 1995
20:30 UTC+7

Myanmar	1–2 (a.e.t.)	Vietnam
Myo Hlaing Win 5'; Aung Kyaw (red card) 25'; Aye Naing (red card) 85'	Report	Lê Huỳnh Đức 10'; Trần Minh Chiến 95'

700th Anniversary Stadium, Chiang Mai
Referee: Pirom Un-Prasert (Thailand)

== Post-match and the impact on the public ==
After the match, a Myanmar football official said the Vietnamese players were "lucky", while Vietnam coach Karl-Heinz Weigang said that the Myanmar players "didn't give us [Vietnam] the respect they deserved". A member of the 1996 Tiger Cup organizing committee, when talking about Vietnam's performance at the 1995 SEA Games with coach Weigang, also said that "the Vietnamese team was just lucky". Singapore's The New Paper also compared Vietnam's performance to the story of Cinderella.

"After many meetings and debates, VTV leaders decided to choose the moment Minh Chien scored a goal against Myanmar as the intro for the sports program broadcast in VTV's noon and evening news program. That goal was chosen because it had all the elements: coherent, fast, neat, and beautiful. The image of Minh Chien's goal celebration showed the desire to win and rise of Vietnamese sports in the international competitions."

– Journalist Quang Huy, shared in 1996, when he was still working at VTV.

Regarding Tran Minh Chien's golden goal, Vietnamese press and media considered it a "goal of a lifetime". Vietnam Television (VTV) even used the image of this goal as the intro for its sports news program for nearly ten years, although before the SEA Games took place, the Vietnamese media was said to have "ignored" this event. Journalist Minh Hung of Saigon Liberation newspaper, after witnessing Tran Minh Chien's golden goal, came up with the idea of organizing the "Vietnamese Golden Ball" award to honor Vietnamese players with outstanding contributions, achievements, and marks during the year; he completed the project in just four hours and sent it to the editorial board of Saigon Liberation newspaper, which quickly approved it. After the 1995 SEA Games were held in Thailand, the Vietnam Golden Ball award ceremony was held for the first time with the title awarded to Lê Huỳnh Đức, while Trần Minh Chiến only finished fourth in the race for the Golden Ball title that year. The 1995 SEA Games was also the only tournament that this player attended; because this player had to retire a year later due to a recurrence of a knee injury.

Tran Minh Chien's golden goal brought millions of Vietnamese people to the streets to celebrate the victory. The phrase "street storming" is also said to have appeared after this match, and is associated with Vietnamese football every time the national team wins in major tournaments. Previously, when Vietnam won against Malaysia in the group stage, many Vietnamese people took to the streets to cheer and shout; and after the team returned home, fans gathered in large numbers to welcome the players.

The victory over Myanmar helped Vietnam reach the SEA Games final for the first time since reintegration, but they lost to Thailand with a heavy score of 0–4 and only won the silver medal; while in the bronze medal match against Singapore, Myanmar lost 0–1. Lao Dong newspaper considered the match with Myanmar a "memorable milestone for Vietnamese football", while Saigon Liberation newspaper commented that the history of Vietnamese football since the country's unification has "turned a new page". A year later, Vietnam joined the ASEAN Football Federation with three other countries, and finished third in the first-ever Southeast Asian Football Championship. Vietnamese football is considered to have risen to the top group in Southeast Asia, while Myanmar has a downward trend, is gradually being rated lower than Vietnam and is no longer among the strong teams in the region. At the ASEAN Championship, Vietnam has won the championship three times in 2008, 2018 and 2024 as well as finished second twice in 1998 and 2022 and has only been eliminated from the group stage twice; Meanwhile, Myanmar football's highest achievement was reaching the semi-finals twice in 2004 and 2016. In men's football at the SEA Games, although it was not until 2019 that Vietnam won the gold medal for the first time in 60 years and achieved this achievement again in 2022, but also won four more silver medals in 1999, 2003, 2005, 2009 and three bronze medals in 1997, 2015 and 2023; while Myanmar's best results were two silver medals in 2007 and 2015. The head-to-head record between the two national teams is different, with Vietnam winning nine, drawing two and losing only once against Myanmar since the 1995 match up to 2024. However, at the SEA Games, the Myanmar U-23 team also defeated Vietnam three times in knockout matches, including two semi-finals in 2007 and 2015 and the bronze medal match in 2011.
