= PSSI Primavera =

PSSI Primavera was a team composed of Indonesia youth national team player aged 17 to 21 that competed in the Italian youth league Campionato Nazionale Primavera during the mid-1990s.

== Former players ==
- (Indonesia) Anang Ma'ruf
- (Indonesia) Bejo Sugiantoro
- (Indonesia) Bima Sakti
- (Indonesia) Kurnia Sandy
- (Indonesia) Kurniawan Dwi Yulianto
- (Indonesia) Yeyen Tumena
