= Win Aung (footballer) =

Burmese footballer (1966–2026)

Personal information
- Date of birth: 1965 or 1966
- Date of death: 13 September 2026 (aged 60)
- Place of death: Tamwe Township, Yangon, Myanmar
- Position: Forward

Senior career*
Years	Team	Apps	(Gls)
1991	Tyrwhitt Soccerites		

International career
1993–1997	Myanmar	11	(9)
- * Club domestic league appearances and goals

Win Aung (Burmese: ဝင်းအောင်; 1965 or 1966– 13 September 2026) was a Burmese footballer who played as a forward. Known for his use of headers to score goals, he moved to Singapore in 1991 to play for the Tyrwhitt Soccerites club. After performing well with them, he was transferred to play as one of the three foreign members on Singapore's national team. Briefly recalled back to Myanmar to play on their national team during the 1991 SEA Games, he returned to Singapore in 1992 to play with Balestier United. He left at the end of 1992 and returned to play with the Myanmar national team, playing at the 1993 SEA Games.

Win Aung retired from football in 2006 and opened a convenience store in Yangon.

== Career ==
Win Aung began playing football for the Myanmar national team in 1989. He moved to Singapore in 1991, when he signed to the Tyrwhitt Soccerites alongside fellow Burmese players Thet Naing and Aung Naing for a total of $70,000. By February, Win Aung had won three Puma Man-of-the-Match trophies, which came with a $100 award, and by June, he had become the Tyrwhitt Soccerites' top striker and his performance moved the team out of the relegation zone. Win Aung suffered an ankle injury in May, forcing him to sit out a week's game. He was briefly suspended in June for a match between the Tyrwhitt Soccerites and Geylang International at the Pools Cup quarterfinals; he had received three cautions and was due to sit out an earlier match, but the officials did not know this. For his final games, he was relegated to a substitute player.

By May 1991, Win Aung had been transferred to Singapore's national team; The New Paper estimated that his transfer would cost the team between $20,000 and $25,000, though the official price was not disclosed. The national team's coach, Robert Chan, had developed an interest in Win Aung after watching him that season, and the Football Association of Singapore decided to offer him a contract if they could afford it after recruiting Australians Warren Spink and Craig Foster. Win Aung had initially been rejected as a candidate for one of the team's three foreign players, as team officials viewed him an unskilled. Win Aung played at the 1991 Malaysia Cup, which Singapore did not win.

Win Aung left Singapore and terminated his contract early with the Semi-Pro League in September 1991, after being recalled by the Myanmar Football Association to participate in trials for the upcoming 1991 SEA Games. Win Aung announced plans to return to the country but said that he had to leave, saying "if I disobey the order [to return to Myanmar], I will not be allowed to leave Myanmar to play soccer abroad again." He was selected by Mynamar to play at the 1991 games.

In November 1991, he signed on as a striker under a one year contract to Balestier United. Though originally meant to start with the team on December 15, he was delayed in Myanmar while seeking permission from the Myanmar Sports Department and Cabinet to play for Singapore; the Myanmar Football Association notified Balestier United officials shortly before Win Aung was to be removed from the team due to his absence. He was delayed again and had still not been cleared to leave the country by mid-January, after the season started. He did return to Singapore and played with Balestier when the team won its first President's Cup.

Win Aung returned to Myanmar at the end of 1992. He played for Myanmar at the 1993 SEA Games, scoring his team's third goal in their match against Singapore, and against Qatar when Myanmar played at the 1994 Asian Games in Japan. He was dropped from the team in 1995 by coach Ger Blok, who described Win Aung as poorly disciplined; Win Aung responded by describing Blok as a poor coach. Blok's decision to fire Win Aung and fellow player Maung Maung Oo proved unpopular; he left the team at the end of the season after they lost to Vietnam in the 1995 games.

Known for his use of headers to score goals, Win Aung played as a striker for much of his career. He played for domestic football clubs, such as the Finance and Revenue F.C., as well as at a football club in Thailand. Win Aung retired from football in 2006 and opened a convenience store in Yangon.

== Personal life and death ==
Wing Aung married a former basketball player c. 2002; the couple had two children as of 2012.

In September 2026, Win Aung was hospitalized at the Aryu International Hospital in Tamwe Township, Yangon, for a lung-related illness. He died there on the afternoon of 13 September 2026 at the age of 60.

== Career statistics ==
Appearances and goals by national team and year
National team	Year	Apps	Goals
Myanmar	1993	4	3
Myanmar	1994	2	1
Myanmar	1996	2	4
Myanmar	1997	3	1
Total		11	9

Scores and results list Myanmar's goal tally first, score column indicates score after each Aung goal.

List of international goals scored by Win Aung
No.	Date	Venue	Opponent	Score	Result	Competition	Ref.
1	15 June 1993	Jurong Stadium, Jurong, Singapore	Brunei	2–0	6–0	1993 SEA Games	
2	15 June 1993	Jurong Stadium, Jurong, Singapore	Brunei	3–0	6–0	1993 SEA Games	
3	17 June 1993	National Stadium, Kallang, Singapore	Singapore	3–2	3–3	1993 SEA Games	
4	3 October 1994	Miyoshi Athletic Stadium, Miyoshi, Japan	Qatar	1–2	2–2	1994 Asian Games	
5	5 September 1996	Jurong Stadium, Jurong, Singapore	Cambodia	2–0	5–0	1996 AFF Championship	
6	5 September 1996	Jurong Stadium, Jurong, Singapore	Cambodia	3–0	5–0	1996 AFF Championship	
7	11 September 1996	Jurong Stadium, Jurong, Singapore	Laos	1–0	4–2	1996 AFF Championship	
8	11 September 1996	Jurong Stadium, Jurong, Singapore	Laos	3–2	4–2	1996 AFF Championship	
9	14 October 1997	Lebak Bulus Stadium, Jakarta, Indonesia	Cambodia	–	3–1	1997 SEA Games	
