= Vũ Minh Hiếu =

Vietnamese footballer

Personal information
- Full name: Vũ Minh Hiếu
- Date of birth: 11 June 1972 (age 54)
- Place of birth: Hanoi, North Vietnam
- Height: 1.70 m (5 ft 7 in)
- Position: Midfielder

Youth career
- 1983–1990: Công An Hà Nội

Senior career*
Years	Team	Apps	(Gls)
1991–2001	Công An Hà Nội	128	(33)
2002–2003	Hàng Không Việt Nam	12	(3)
2004–2005	Hà Nội ACB	4	(1)

International career
1995–2005	Vietnam	22	(7)
- * Club domestic league appearances and goals

Vũ Minh Hiếu (born 11 June 1972) is a retired Vietnamese football who played as a midfielder.

He spent career playing for Công An Hà Nội, Hàng Không Việt Nam (which later became Hà Nội ACB). He was the captain of his club. He was famous for his passing, close control, and free kicks, and was regarded as one of the best attacking midfielders in Vietnam. He was capped several times by the Vietnam national team. However, he did not see his action with the success of the national team because the preferred tactics played by Vietnam national team at that time was 5-3-2, with Nguyễn Hồng Sơn as the favorite choice for the middle position in the midfield. Hiếu's notable performance was in the 1997 SEA Games, where he came in as a substitution and scored 2 goals in the match with Laos after the Vietnamese led by 0-1 after the first half.
