= Văn Sỹ Sơn =

Vietnamese footballer and manager (born 1972)

Personal information
- Full name: Văn Sỹ Sơn
- Date of birth: August 26, 1972 (age 54)
- Place of birth: Nghệ An, North Vietnam
- Position: Left-back

Youth career
- 1991–1992: Sông Lam Nghệ An

Senior career*
Years	Team	Apps	(Gls)
1992–2007	Sông Lam Nghệ An		

Managerial career
- 2008–2020: Hà Nội (assistant)
- 2021: Bình Phước
- 2022–2025: Quảng Nam
- * Club domestic league appearances and goals

Văn Sỹ Sơn (born 26 August 1972) is a Vietnamese former footballer and manager who was most recently the head coach of V.League 1 club Quảng Nam.

== Early life ==
He grew up in Nghệ An, Vietnam.

== Career ==
Sỹ Sơn spent his entire career playing for Sông Lam Nghệ An. He captained the team from 2004 until his retirement in 2007.

After his retirement, Sỹ Sơn became the assistant manager of Hà Nội from 2008 to 2020. He was appointed as the manager of Quảng Nam in August 2022 and helped the club win the 2023 V.League 2, gaining a promotion to the 2023 V.League 1.

== Style of play ==
As a skillful and solid left-back, was described as a "fiery captain on the field".

== Personal life ==
His brothers Văn Sỹ Hùng and Văn Sỹ Thủy were also footballers and played for the Sông Lam Nghệ An. He is the father of Văn Sỹ Phong.

== Honours ==
=== Player ===
Sông Lam Nghệ An

- V.League 1: 1999–2000, 2000–2001
- Vietnamese Cup: 2001-02
- Vietnamese Super Cup: 2000, 2001, 2002

=== Manager ===
Quảng Nam

- V.League 2: 2023
