= Cherdchai Suwannang =

Thai footballer and coach (born 1969)

Personal information
- Date of birth: 25 September 1969 (age 57)
- Place of birth: Thailand
- Position: Defender

Senior career*
Years	Team	Apps	(Gls)
1989–1997	Bangkok Bank F.C.		

International career
1990–1995	Thailand		
- * Club domestic league appearances and goals

Cherdchai Suwannang (Thai: เชิดชัย สุวรรณนัง; born 25 September 1969) is a Thai football coach and retired defender who played for Bangkok Bank F.C. from 1989 to 1997 and for the Thailand national team, including at the 1992 Asian Cup.
