= Lee Man Hon =

Singaporean footballer

Lee Man Hon is a former football player from Singapore. He was one of the top midfield players in Singapore in the 1990s and played at international level for the Singapore national team from 1989 to 1997. He also played for the Singapore team in the Malaysian League and the Malaysia Cup, and in Singapore's S.League.

== Education ==
Lee studied at Bukit Ho Swee Secondary School.

== Football career ==
In 1992, Lee with four others, went to Czechoslovak First League FC Nitra on a 10 week attachment under the Goh Chok Tong / City Development talent search project.

Lee played on the Singapore team which won the Malaysian League and Malaysia Cup double in 1994. He was well known for his cultured left foot, making the left midfield position his own, and was one of the first choice players for taking corners.

After the Football Association of Singapore withdrew the Singapore team from the Malaysian competitions at the end of the 1994 season, Lee went on to play in Singapore's newly formed S.League. He played for the Singapore Armed Forces Football Club when the S.League was first inaugurated, and later for Marine Castle United.

Lee was signed by Tampines Rovers for the 2000 season and went on to captain the team a year later.

In 1997, Lee was banned from driving all vehicles for two years. In 1999, Lee was sentenced to five weeks jail. He was caught riding a motorcycle while under a driving ban. He was convicted of driving without a valid licence.

== Honours ==
=== International ===
Malaysia Cup : 1994
