= Maxie Abad =

Association football player

Personal information
- Position: Striker

Youth career
- Midgets B
- Brescia Primavera

International career
Years	Team	Apps	(Gls)
1986–1996	Philippines		

Maxie Abad is a Filipino retired international footballer, lawyer and triathlete.

== Early life and education ==
Abad became involved in football as early as when he was on his second grade. It was during that time when a football coach invited him to report for training with the "Midgets B" team after he was seen playing football during recess time. He attended the University of the Philippines Diliman and obtained his law degree at the Ateneo de Manila Law School.

== Football career ==
Abad played as a striker for the Philippines national football team from 1986 to 1996. He skippered the Philippine squad that participated at the first ASEAN Football Championship in 1996. At the club level, he played for numerous semi-professional clubs. He has trained with the youth team of Brescia, Italy.

== Post-retirement ==
In 2002, Abad, Ricardo Venus and Monty Roxas established the Manila Soccer Academy. In 2014, he was reportedly working as director and chief legal counsel in an oil exploration and production company. Abad also became involved in triathlon being a member of the Polo Triathlon Team. He finished at the 2007 Ironman Western Australia and numerous Ironman 70.3 Philippines.

== Personal life ==
Maxie Abad is married and has three sons and one daughter as of 2014. Abad is of Italian descent and a fan of AC Milan.
