= Sanor Longsawang =

Thai footballer (born 1971)

Personal information
- Full name: Sanor Longsawang
- Date of birth: 2 December 1971 (age 54)
- Place of birth: Nakhon Sawan, Thailand
- Height: 1.77 m (5 ft 9 1/2 in)
- Position: Defensive midfielder

Senior career*
Years	Team	Apps	(Gls)
1993–2000	Thai Farmers Bank	156	(21)
2004–2008	Nakhon Sawan	75	(8)
2009–2011	Chainat	24	(0)
2012	Paknampho NSRU	19	(0)

International career
1996–2001	Thailand	38	(4)
Medal record
Thailand national football team
Sea Games
Gold medal – first place	Sea Games 1993	Football
Gold medal – first place	Sea Games 1995	Football
Gold medal – first place	Sea Games 1997	Football
Gold medal – first place	Sea Games 1999	Football
- * Club domestic league appearances and goals as of 18 July 2008

Sanor Longsawang (Thai เสนาะ โล่งสว่าง) is a Thai retired football player. He is a midfielder who scored 4 goals for the Thailand national team and appeared in three 1998 FIFA World Cup qualifying matches. In 2012, he played for Paknampho NSRU in Thai Division 2 League.

== Honours ==
Thai Farmers Bank

- Asian Club Championship: 1993–94, 1994–95
- Kor Royal Cup: 1993, 1995, 1999
- Queen's Cup: 1994, 1995, 1996, 1997
- Afro-Asian Club Championship: 1994
- Thailand FA Cup: 1999

Chainat Hornbill

- Regional League Division 2 Northern Region: 2010
