= Văn Sỹ Hùng =

Vietnamese football manager and former footballer

Personal information
- Full name: Văn Sỹ Hùng
- Date of birth: 30 November 1969 (age 56)
- Place of birth: Thanh Hóa, North Vietnam
- Height: 1.62 m (5 ft 4 in)
- Position: Striker

Youth career
- 1986–1989: Công An Thanh Hóa

Senior career*
Years	Team	Apps	(Gls)
1990–1992	Công An Thanh Hóa	24	(8)
1993–2002	Sông Lam Nghệ An	74	(28)
2002–2003	Hoàng Anh Gia Lai	17	(8)

International career
1997–2000	Vietnam	14	(7)
- * Club domestic league appearances and goals

Văn Sỹ Hùng (born 30 November 1969) is a Vietnamese football manager and former footballer.

== Career ==
Văn spent his entire playing career in the Vietnamese V-League and played for the Vietnam national football team.

His brothers Văn Sỹ Sơn and Văn Sỹ Thủy were also footballers.
