= Johan Zinin =

Bruneian former footballer

Personal information
- Full name: Johan bin Haji Zinin
- Date of birth: 12 February 1974 (age 52)
- Place of birth: Brunei
- Position: Defender

Senior career*
Years	Team	Apps	(Gls)
1996–1997	Brunei		
2007–2008	March United		

International career^{‡}
1996–1997	Brunei	5+	(0)
- * Club domestic league appearances and goals as of 29 July 2024 ‡ National team caps and goals as of 29 July 2024

Johan bin Haji Zinin (born 12 February 1974) is a Bruneian former footballer who played for the Brunei representative team in the Malaysian league system as a defender. He also played for the Brunei national football team at the 1996 AFF Championship as well as the 19th SEA Games in 1997.

== Club career ==
Johan began playing for the Brunei team at the start of the 1996 Liga Perdana. The Wasps finished in fifth position in the regular league and went on to make the semifinals of that year's Malaysia Cup when they were beaten by eventual winners Selangor, 2–3 on aggregate.

Johan stayed on for another year in the 1997 season and the Brunei side led by David Booth astoundingly repeated last year's performance in both league and cup. They were denied a Malaysia Cup final berth by Pahang who beat them 3–6 over two legs in the semi-finals. However, Tok Gajah would then lose the final to Selangor.

After leaving the Bruneian representative team, Johan would play domestically with various Bruneian clubs, the last being March United in the 2007–08 Brunei Premier League.

== International career ==
Johan made his first appearance for the Brunei national team at the inaugural 1996 AFF Championship (then known as the Tiger Cup) against Singapore on 4 September at the Singapore National Stadium. He was a substitute for Ali Mustafa in a 3–0 defeat. He then made the starting lineup for the remaining matches of the tournament, including a memorable 1–0 win against the Philippines on 8 September, the winner scored by Irwan Mohammad. Brunei finished in fourth place out of five teams and failed to qualify for the semi-finals with one win and three losses.

Johan was part of the Brunei football team that competed at the 1997 SEA Games, in which Brunei registered four losses out of four games. Johan was known to have started the final game against Singapore on 12 October, where the Lions came out 1–0 winners.

== Personal life ==
Johan is currently a government official who works for the Survey Department at the Ministry of Development as the Chief Technical Surveyor of Tutong District.
