= Sumardi =

Indonesian footballer

Personal information
- Date of birth: 26 June 1972 (age 54)
- Place of birth: Bontang, Indonesia
- Height: 1.78 m (5 ft 10 in)
- Position: Goalkeeper

Senior career*
Years	Team	Apps	(Gls)
1994–2004	PKT Bontang	77	(0)
2005–2006	Persiba Balikpapan	21	(0)
2007	Deltras Sidoarjo	10	(0)
2008	Persibo Bojonegoro	11	(0)
2008–2009	Persisam Putra Samarinda	28	(0)
2009–2010	Bontang	11	(0)
2010–2011	Persibo Bojonegoro	31	(0)
2013	Mitra Kukar	13	(0)
Total		202	(0)

Managerial career
- 2013: Mitra Kukar (Goalkeeper coach)
- * Club domestic league appearances and goals

Sumardi (born 26 June 1972) is an Indonesian former footballer who plays as a goalkeeper.

== Honours ==
PKT Bontang

- Liga Indonesia Premier Division runner up: 1999–2000

Persisam Putra Samarinda

- Liga Indonesia Premier Division: 2008–09
