= Nguyễn Văn Phụng =

Vietnamese footballer (born 1968)

Personal information
- Date of birth: 1968 (age 57–58)
- Place of birth: Quảng Ngãi, Vietnam
- Position: Goalkeeper

Senior career*
Years	Team	Apps	(Gls)
1992–2002	Cảng Sài Gòn		

International career
- Vietnam
- * Club domestic league appearances and goals

Nguyễn Văn Phụng (born 1968) is a Vietnamese former footballer who played as a goalkeeper.

== Early life ==
He played volleyball as a child.

== Career ==
He was described as "in the ranks of the golden generation of Vietnamese football".

== Personal life ==
He is a native of Quảng Ngãi, Vietnam.
