= Văn Sỹ Thủy =

Vietnamese footballer (born 1969)

Văn Sỹ Thủy (born 1974) is a Vietnamese former footballer.

== Career ==
Văn Sỹ Thủy was born in Nghệ An in a family with football tradition as his father Văn Sỹ Chi and both his brothers Văn Sỹ Hùng and Văn Sỹ Sơn are footballers.

As a striker and with strength good positioning and finishing skills, he was considered as one of the best strikers of his generation. With Sông Lam Nghệ An, he was the top scorer of the 1999–2000 V-League. He played for the Vietnam national football team.

After retiring from professional football. he founded company Hồng Lĩnh Hà Tĩnh Invest.
