= Yeyen Tumena =

Indonesian footballer

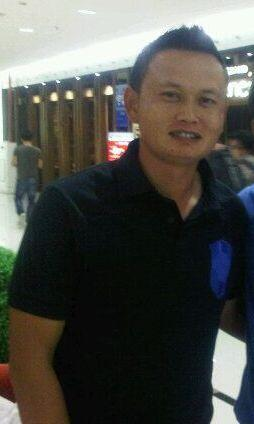

Personal information
- Full name: Yeyen Tumena Chaniago
- Date of birth: 16 May 1976 (age 50)
- Place of birth: Padang, Indonesia
- Height: 1.75 m (5 ft 9 in)
- Position: Left back

Youth career
- 1993–1994: PSSI Primavera

Senior career*
Years	Team	Apps	(Gls)
1995–2001	PSM Makassar	110	(4)
2001–2003	Persikota Tangerang	51	(2)
2003–2004	Perseden Denpasar	29	(4)
2004–2005	Persebaya Surabaya	26	(1)
2005–2006	PSMS Medan	30	(0)
2006–2007	Persija Jakarta	16	(0)
2007–2008	Persma Manado	18	(0)
Total		280	(11)

International career
1993–1994	Indonesia primavera		
1996	Indonesia	14	(0)

Managerial career
- 2010–2011: Milan Junior camp Indonesia
- 2013: Indonesia (assistant)
- 2017–2019: Bhayangkara FC (technical director)
- 2019: Indonesia (assistant and caretaker)
- 2022: Perak FC (assistant coach)
- 2023: Indonesia U-23 (performance analyst)
- 2026–: Arema FC (technical director)
- * Club domestic league appearances and goals

Yeyen Tumena (born 16 May 1976) is an Indonesian former footballer and manager who played as defender. He played for Persma Manado, Persija Jakarta, Persikota Tangerang, Persebaya Surabaya, Perseden Denpasar, PSMS Medan, PSM Makassar and the Indonesia national team. He is currently the technical director of Arema F.C.

== Managerial statistics ==
As of match played 19 November 2019

Managerial record by team and tenure
Team	Nat	From	To	Record							
Team	Nat	From	To	G	W	D	L	GF	GA	GD	Win %
Bhayangkara (Caretaker)	(Indonesia)	14 August 2019	31 August 2019	4	0	1	3	2	6	−4	0.00
Indonesia (Caretaker)	(Indonesia)	15 November 2019	31 December 2019	1	0	0	1	0	2	−2	0.00
Career Total				5	0	1	4	2	8	−6	0.00

== Career ==
Tumena started his career with PSM Makassar.

== Club statistics ==
Club	Season	Super League		Premier Division		Piala Indonesia		Total	
Club	Season	Apps	Goals	Apps	Goals	Apps	Goals	Apps	Goals
Persikota Tangerang	2002	-		19	0	-		19	0
Persma Manado	2007	-		5	0	-		5	0
Total		-		24	0	-		24	0

== Honours ==
PSM Makassar

- Liga Indonesia Premier Division: 1999–2000; runner-up: 1995–96

Persebaya Surabaya

- Liga Indonesia Premier Division: 2004
