= Lê Đức Anh Tuấn =

Vietnamese footballer

Lê Đức Anh Tuấn is a Vietnamese former footballer.

== Early life ==
He grew up aspiring to become a football manager.

== Career ==
He played for the Vietnam national football team.

== Style of play ==
He mainly operated as a left-back.

== Personal life ==
After retiring from professional football, he worked as an engineer.
