= Anang Ma'ruf =

Indonesian footballer (born 1976)

Personal information
- Full name: Anang Ma'ruf
- Date of birth: 28 May 1976 (age 50)
- Place of birth: Surabaya, Indonesia
- Height: 1.76 m (5 ft 9 1/2 in)
- Position: Right-back

Youth career
- Persebaya Surabaya
- 1993–1994: PSSI Primavera

Senior career*
Years	Team	Apps	(Gls)
1994–1999	Persebaya Surabaya	107	(13)
1999–2002	Persija Jakarta	88	(1)
2003	Deltras Sidoarjo	27	(1)
2004–2010	Persebaya Surabaya	80	(8)
2010–2011	Deltras Sidoarjo	21	(0)
2011–2012	Gresik United	22	(0)
2013	Perseba Bangkalan	21	(0)
Total		366	(23)

International career
1995–2000	Indonesia	28	(1)
- * Club domestic league appearances and goals

Anang Ma'ruf (born 28 May 1976) is an Indonesian former footballer.

== Career ==
He was born in Surabaya, Indonesia. Anang Ma'ruf started his career with Persebaya in early 1990s. Then he joined PSSI Primavera Program in Italy in middle 1990s. Anang had stint with Persija in 2001 when he became champion of Indonesia League. He picked up a left elbow dislocation during match against Persitara on 11 November 2009. The doctor (Dr. Dwikora Novembri Utomo, SpOT) said, he was likely to rest six weeks.

== International goals ==
No.	Date	Venue	Opponent	Score	Result	Competition
1.	14 November 1999	Gelora Bung Karno Stadium, Jakarta, Indonesia	Hong Kong	1–0	3–1	2000 AFC Asian Cup qualification

== Honours ==
Persebaya Surabaya

- Liga Indonesia Premier Division: 1996–97, 2004; runner up: 1998–99
- Liga Indonesia First Division: 2006

Persija Jakarta

- Liga Indonesia Premier Division: 2001

Indonesia

- SEA Games silver medal: 1997; bronze medal: 1999
- AFF Championship third place: 1998
- Indonesian Independence Cup: 2000
