= Kurniawan Dwi Yulianto =

Indonesian footballer (born 1976)

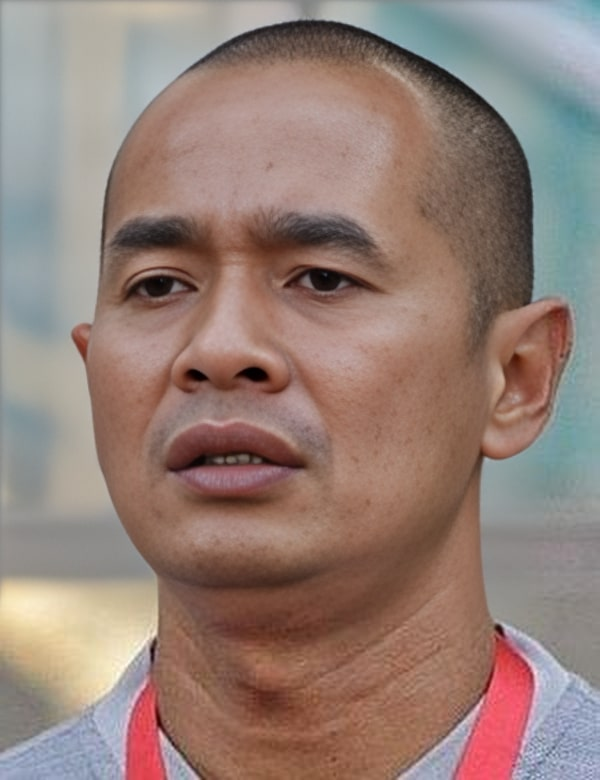
- Kurniawan in 2022

Personal information
- Full name: Kurniawan Dwi Yulianto
- Date of birth: 13 July 1976 (age 50)
- Place of birth: Magelang Regency, Indonesia
- Height: 1.74 m (5 ft 9 in)
- Position: Striker

Youth career
- 1993: PSSI Primavera
- 1994: Sampdoria

Senior career*
Years	Team	Apps	(Gls)
1994–1995	Sampdoria	0	(0)
1994–1996	→ Luzern (loan)	12	(3)
1996–1999	Pelita Jaya	44	(38)
1999–2001	PSM Makassar	58	(37)
2001–2003	PSPS Pekanbaru	50	(28)
2003–2004	Persebaya Surabaya	28	(14)
2004–2005	Persija Jakarta	18	(10)
2005–2006	Sarawak	31	(29)
2006–2007	PSS Sleman	16	(11)
2007–2008	Persitara North Jakarta	32	(14)
2008–2009	Persisam Putra Samarinda	22	(10)
2009–2010	Persela Lamongan	24	(7)
2010–2011	Tangerang Wolves	16	(6)
2011–2012	Pro Duta	27	(9)
2012–2013	Persipon Pontianak	18	(9)
Total		396	(215)

International career
1995–2005	Indonesia	59	(33)

Managerial career
- 2018: Indonesia (assistant coach)
- 2019: Indonesia U23 (assistant coach)
- 2019–2021: Sabah
- 2022–2025: Como (assistant coach)
- 2023: Indonesia U23 (assistant coach)
- 2025: Indonesia U20 (attacking coach)
- 2025: Indonesia (assistant coach)
- 2026: Indonesia U17
- * Club domestic league appearances and goals

Kurniawan Dwi Yulianto (born 13 July 1976) is an Indonesian former professional footballer who played as a striker. Kurniawan is the fourth most capped players and goalscorer for the Indonesia national team with 33 goals in 59 appearances. Kurniawan got himself a nickname of "Skinny" (Indonesian: Kurus) due to his slender figure.

== Club career ==
=== Primavera years ===
Kurniawan became a household name in Indonesia when he went on a scoring spree for the Indonesian youth team that went to Italy in 1993 to train at Serie A club Sampdoria and play in the Campionato Nazionale Primavera, the league for youth teams of Serie A and Serie B clubs. The Indonesian football association PSSI sent the team abroad for two years to prepare for the 1994 AFC Youth Championship in Jakarta and the qualifying round for the 1996 Summer Olympics. Kurniawan was so prolific that Sampdoria's coach at that time, Sven-Göran Eriksson, included the 18-year old in the team that toured Asia in 1994, along with superstars Roberto Mancini and Attilio Lombardo who just won the 1993–94 Coppa Italia title.

=== FC Luzern ===
Kurniawan's performance in the Primavera league and with Sampdoria in exhibition matches caught the attention of other European clubs, including Swiss top-tier club FC Luzern that signed him on loan for the 1994–95 season. Kurniawan scored three goals in his 12 appearances for the Lucerne-based club, a respectable result for any teenager with no previous professional career. Kurniawan is the first and only Indonesian national who has scored in a top-flight European league. He was also the only Indonesian who competed at the UEFA Intertoto Cup, which was abolished in 2008. Despite such achievements, young Kurniawan suffered homesickness, culture shock, and injuries in Switzerland.

Sampdoria in 1995 called him back from the loan spell to prepare him for the 1995–96 Serie A but Kurniawan chose to return to Indonesia.

=== Indonesian clubs ===
Kurniawan played for 12 teams in Indonesia after his 1995 return, winning the national title with PSM Makassar in 2000 and Persebaya Surabaya in 2004. He scored more than 170 goals for those teams combined. That said, his re-entry to Indonesia was not smooth as defenders brutally targeted the popular striker and the media hounded him as a celebrity. The rough transition during his early 20s led him to intentions of quitting football and a drug scandal that made PSSI suspended him from the national team. Criticism was rife against Kurniawan for his inability to match the quality he showed in Europe. He overcame the challenges and became more stable when he joined PSM in 1999 and won his first team trophy in 2000. He came second on the top scorer list that year below his perennial rival Bambang Pamungkas.

=== Sarawak ===
Despite his popularity coming from his achievements in Europe and Indonesia, he was most prolific when he played in Malaysia for Sarawak FA in 2005–06 with 29 goals in 31 appearances. When he joined, Sarawak was playing in the Malaysian Premier League, the second-tier of Malaysian football. His goals helped the club to win promotion and compete in the 2006 Malaysian Super League.

== International career ==
Outside his dark years in the late 1990s, Kurniawan has always been the top choice for the youth and senior Indonesian national football teams from 1993 to 2005. With 33 goals in 59 appearances for the senior team, he has collected more caps and goals than any other Indonesian, except Bambang Pamungkas who also played in Malaysia when Kurniawan was there. His first three goals were scored against Cambodia in a 10–0 rout in the 1995 Southeast Asian Games in Thailand.

== Managerial career ==
After Kurniawan retired as a player in late 2013, he chose to become a coach at the new Chelsea Soccer School Indonesia, which is supported by English Premier League club Chelsea F.C. despite approaches from Indonesian clubs. One reason was the position did not require him to stay in Indonesia for long stretches as he wanted to spend more time in Malaysia, where his Malaysian wife opens a restaurant business. The pressure of training an Indonesian professional team throughout most of the year would take him away for too long.

After approaches by PSSI and national team coaches, Kurniawan agreed to be a part-time assistant coach for Indonesian youth teams, including the U-23 team that won silver at the 2019 Southeast Asian Games in the Philippines.

Newly promoted Malaysia Super League club Sabah FC became the first club that hired Kurniawan as a head coach in December 2019. The decision followed the inability of the previous coach Jelius Ating to lead a top-tier team due to his lack of AFC Pro coaching license, which Kurniawan holds.

Kurniawan's first season at Sabah reaped mixed reviews from club decision-makers with some applauding the first-time head coach for keeping the team out of relegation while some criticizing him for only winning two out of 11 matches played in the shortened 2020 Malaysia Super League season amid the COVID-19 pandemic. The latter group managed to push Kurniawan out in November 2020. However, a change of management leadership at the club led to a January 2021 rehiring of Kurniawan who was about to join Malaysia Premier League club Kuching City F.C. as an assistant coach. On 28 August 2021, Sabah lost 4–0 against UiTM FC. Next days, Sabah announced that they had sacked Kurniawan.

== Personal life ==
Kurniawan mostly resides in Kuching, Sarawak, Malaysia where his second wife opened a restaurant business that has several outlets. Kurniawan met her when he was playing for Sarawak FA in 2005, two years after his divorce from his first wife.

== Career statistics ==
Appearances and goals by national team and year
National team	Year	Apps	Goals
Indonesia	1995	4	3
Indonesia	1996	6	4
Indonesia	1997	11	9
Indonesia	1998	3	2
Indonesia	1999	2	0
Indonesia	2000	13	5
Indonesia	2001	6	4
Indonesia	2003	4	1
Indonesia	2004	6	4
Indonesia	2005	4	1
Total		59	33

Scores and results list Indonesia's goal tally first, score column indicates score after each Kurniawan goal.

List of international goals scored by Kurniawan Dwi Yulianto
No.	Date	Venue	Cap	Opponent	Score	Result	Competition
1	11 December 1995	700th Anniversary Stadium, Chiang Mai, Thailand	2	Cambodia	5–0	10–0	1995 SEA Games
2	11 December 1995	700th Anniversary Stadium, Chiang Mai, Thailand	2	Cambodia	6–0	10–0	1995 SEA Games
3	11 December 1995	700th Anniversary Stadium, Chiang Mai, Thailand	2	Cambodia	7–0	10–0	1995 SEA Games
4	2 September 1996	National Stadium, Kallang, Singapore	5	Laos	3–0	5–1	1996 AFF Championship
5	7 September 1996	National Stadium, Kallang, Singapore	6	Cambodia	1–0	3–0	1996 AFF Championship
6	11 September 1996	National Stadium, Kallang, Singapore	8	Vietnam	1–1	1–1	1996 AFF Championship
7	15 September 1996	National Stadium, Kallang, Singapore	10	Vietnam	1–2	2–3	1996 AFF Championship
8	14 September 1997	Siliwangi Stadium, Bandung, Indonesia	14	Tanzania	2–1	3–1	Friendly
9	14 September 1997	Siliwangi Stadium, Bandung, Indonesia	14	Tanzania	3–1	3–1	Friendly
10	28 September 1997	Gelora 10 November Stadium, Surabaya, Indonesia	15	New Zealand	3–0	5–0	Friendly
11	28 September 1997	Gelora 10 November Stadium, Surabaya, Indonesia	15	New Zealand	4–0	5–0	Friendly
12	5 October 1997	Gelora Senayan Stadium, Jakarta, Indonesia	16	Laos	3–0	5–2	1997 SEA Games
13	7 October 1997	Gelora Senayan Stadium, Jakarta, Indonesia	17	Vietnam	2–1	2–2	1997 SEA Games
14	9 October 1997	Gelora Senayan Stadium, Jakarta, Indonesia	18	Malaysia	4–0	4–0	1997 SEA Games
15	12 October 1997	Gelora Senayan Stadium, Jakarta, Indonesia	19	Philippines	2–0	2–0	1997 SEA Games
16	18 October 1997	Gelora Senayan Stadium, Jakarta, Indonesia	21	Thailand	1–1	1–1	1997 SEA Games
17	5 September 1998	Thống Nhất Stadium, Ho Chi Minh City, Vietnam	23	Thailand	1–0	3–3	1998 AFF Championship
18	15 August 2000	Gelora Senayan Stadium, Jakarta, Indonesia	24	Thailand	2–0	4–1	2000 Independence Cup
19	28 August 2000	Gelora Senayan Stadium, Jakarta, Indonesia	27	Myanmar	2–0	4–1	2000 Independence Cup
20	28 August 2000	Gelora Senayan Stadium, Jakarta, Indonesia	27	Myanmar	3–0	4–1	2000 Independence Cup
21	6 November 2000	700th Anniversary Stadium, Chiang Mai, Thailand	35	Philippines	2–0	3–0	2000 AFF Championship
22	12 November 2000	700th Anniversary Stadium, Chiang Mai, Thailand	37	Myanmar	4–0	5–0	2000 AFF Championship
23	12 November 2000	700th Anniversary Stadium, Chiang Mai, Thailand	37	Myanmar	5–0	5–0	2000 AFF Championship
24	8 April 2001	Gelora Bung Karno Stadium, Jakarta, Indonesia	40	Maldives	2–0	5–0	2002 FIFA World Cup qualification
25	22 April 2001	Gelora Bung Karno Stadium, Jakarta, Indonesia	41	Cambodia	6–0	6–0	2002 FIFA World Cup qualification
26	6 May 2001	Rasmee Dhandu Stadium, Malé, Maldives	43	Maldives	1–0	2–0	2002 FIFA World Cup qualification
27	13 May 2001	Kunming Tuodong Sports Center, Kunming, China	44	China	1–0	1–5	2002 FIFA World Cup qualification
28	6 October 2003	Prince Abdullah Al Faisal Stadium, Jeddah, Saudi Arabia	47	Bhutan	1–0	2–0	2002 FIFA World Cup qualification
29	7 December 2004	Thống Nhất Stadium, Ho Chi Minh City, Vietnam	52	Laos	6–0	6–0	2004 AFF Championship
30	13 December 2004	Mỹ Đình National Stadium, Hanoi, Vietnam	54	Cambodia	6–0	8–0	2004 AFF Championship
31	13 December 2004	Mỹ Đình National Stadium, Hanoi, Vietnam	54	Cambodia	7–0	8–0	2004 AFF Championship
32	28 December 2004	Gelora Bung Karno Stadium, Jakarta, Indonesia	55	Malaysia	1–0	1–2	2004 AFF Championship
33	3 January 2005	National Stadium, Kallang, Singapore	56	Malaysia	1–1	4–1	2004 AFF Championship

== Managerial statistics ==
As of 28 August 2021

Managerial record by team and tenure
Team	From	To	Record							
Team	From	To	G	W	D	L	GF	GA	GD	Win %
Sabah FC	19 December 2019	29 August 2021	31	6	10	15	32	54	−22	19.35
Career total			31	6	10	15	32	54	−22	19.35

== Honours ==
PSM Makassar

- Liga Indonesia Premier Division: 1999–2000; runner up: 2001

Persebaya Surabaya

- Liga Indonesia Premier Division: 2004

Persija Jakarta

- Copa Indonesia runner-up: 2005

Persisam Putra Samarida

- Liga Indonesia Premier Division: 2008–09

Persela Lamongan

- Piala Gubernur Jatim: 2009

Indonesia

- Indonesian Independence Cup: 2000
- AFF Championship runner-up: 2000, 2004; third place: 1998
- SEA Games silver medal: 1997

Individual

- Liga Indonesia Premier Division Top Goalscorer: 1997–98
