= Trần Minh Chiến =

Vietnamese footballer (born 1974)

Trần Minh Chiến (born 20 July 1974) is a Vietnamese football manager and former footballer.

== Career ==
Trần played as a forward and played for the Vietnam national team and worked as a manager after retiring from professional football.
