= Huỳnh Quốc Cường =

Vietnamese footballer (born 1972)

Personal information
- Date of birth: 19 March 1972 (age 54)
- Place of birth: Sa Đéc, Sa Đéc, South Vietnam
- Height: 1.72 m (5 ft 8 in)
- Position: Striker

Senior career*
Years	Team	Apps	(Gls)
1994–2004	Đồng Tháp		

International career
1995–1997	Vietnam	11	(2)
- * Club domestic league appearances and goals

Huỳnh Quốc Cường (born 19 March 1972) is a Vietnamese former footballer who played as a striker.

== Career ==
He joined the youth academy of Vietnamese side Đồng Tháp at the age of sixteen. He was later promoted to the first team of Đồng Tháp, helping the club win the league.

== Style of play ==
He mainly operated as a striker and was described as "romantic, not aggressive but flexible and gentle".

== Personal life ==
After retiring from professional football, he worked in the farm industry.
