= Nguyễn Chí Bảo =

Vietnamese footballer

Nguyễn Chí Bảo (1972 – September 1, 2023) was a Vietnamese footballer who played as a defender.

== Early life ==
He had three brothers.

== Career ==
He played for Vietnamese side Hồ Chí Minh City Police FC, helping the club win the league.

== Style of play ==
He mainly operated as a right-back and was described as "possessing a small physique, a rolling, mischievous, and mobile playing style with high-damage side-climbs and crosses".

== Personal life ==
After retiring from professional football, he worked as a security guard.
