= Nguyễn Hữu Đang (footballer) =

Vietnamese football manager (born 1969)

Personal information
- Full name: Nguyễn Hữu Đang
- Date of birth: 5 March 1969 (age 57)
- Place of birth: Nha Trang, Khánh Hòa, South Vietnam
- Height: 1.70 m (5 ft 7 in)
- Position: Midfielder

Youth career
- 1980–1984: Khatoco Khánh Hòa

Senior career*
Years	Team	Apps	(Gls)
1985–2001	Khatoco Khánh Hòa	137	(61)
2001–2007	Hoàng Anh Gia Lai	71	(19)
2007–2008	Hà Nội	12	(0)

International career
1995–2002	Vietnam	25	(3)
- * Club domestic league appearances and goals

Nguyễn Hữu Đang (born 5 March 1969) is a Vietnamese football manager and former footballer. Nguyễn Hữu Đang spent his entire career playing in V-League and was regarded as part of the "golden generation" of the Vietnam national football team.

== Club career ==
Nguyễn Hữu Đang started playing in 1985 with Khanh Hoa Sports School. He played for Khatoco Khanh Hoa from 1986 to 2001. Then, in 2001, after Khatoco Khanh Hoa get relegated to V-league 2, he joined Hoang Anh Gia Lai and won the V.League 1 two times. From 2006 to 2007, he played for Hanoi T&T. After helped Hanoi T&T promoted to V-League 1, he announced his retirement.

== Managerial career ==
In 2010, he joined the PVF youth academy as a manager. He led his team to won the U13 Vietnamese national cup in 2012. In 2019, he joined XSKT Can Tho.

== Personal life ==
He married Luong Thi Nhat Le and have two children, his youngest son - Nguyen Phu Thang was a player for PVF's U13 team, his other son is Nguyen Huu Thang who was playing in XSKT Can Tho.

After announced his retirement in 2008, he was running a small shop named after him.
