= Nguyễn Hồng Sơn =

Vietnamese footballer

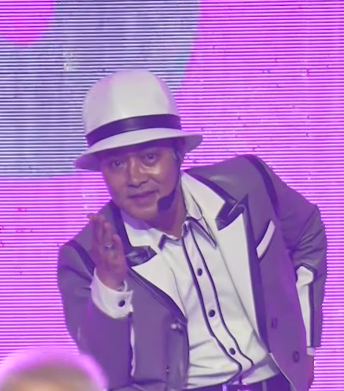
- Hồng Sơn in 2024

Personal information
- Full name: Nguyễn Sỹ Sơn
- Date of birth: 9 October 1970 (age 56)
- Place of birth: Hanoi, North Vietnam
- Height: 1.67 m (5 ft 6 in)
- Position: Outside right

Youth career
- 1982–1987: Thể Công

Senior career*
Years	Team	Apps	(Gls)
1988–2004	Thể Công	401	(58)
2004–2005	Công Nhân Bia Đỏ	29	(8)
Total		430	(66)

International career
1993–2001	Vietnam	53	(18)
1997–2005	Vietnam Futsal		

Managerial career
- 2005: Thành Nghĩa Quảng Ngãi
- 2005–2016: Viettel Youth
- 2006–2007: Vietnam Futsal (assistant)
- * Club domestic league appearances and goals

Nguyễn Hồng Sơn (born Nguyễn Sỹ Sơn, 9 October 1970) is a Vietnamese former footballer who played as an outside right and second striker. He is widely regarded to be one of the greatest Vietnamese players of all time.

== Career ==
Nguyễn Hồng Sơn joined the Thể Công FC in 1988 and started to wear the national team in 1993. Initially, Hồng Sơn played in the striker position and then switched to wingers.

In 1990, Hồng Sơn won the title of top scorer of the national championship. He had won a silver medal at the 18th, 20th and SEA Games SEA Games, 1998 bronze medal in the Tiger 1996 Cup and SEA Games 19.

After awarded 1998 AFF Championship's MVP, Nguyễn Hồng Sơn was awarded the title of Asia's best player in August and Vietnamese Golden Ball for the first time.

In early 2001, he won Vietnamese Golden Ball for the second time. In the same year, he was invited to Pepsi World Challenge with many world's famous players such as David Beckham, Dwight Yorke, Rui Costa, Roberto Carlos, and took second place.

Late V-League season 2002, Hồng Sơn announced retirement due to injury but in the second phase of the 2003 season, he returned to The Public Football team and then competed for Red Beer Workers. He is also a Colonel ranked officer of the Vietnam People's Army.

After retiring from the competition, Nguyễn Hồng Sơn became a football coach leading Thanh Nghia Football Club – Quang Ngai, then the U15 team of Can Cong. At the 2007 Southeast Asian Games, he worked as a vice-coach for the Vietnamese national futsal team.

In June 2024, he become a player in the reality show Call Me By Fire. After he loses in Performance 3.

== International goals ==
#	Date	Venue	Opponent	Score	Result	Competition
1	30 April 1993	Singapore	Indonesia	1–0	1–2	1994 FIFA World Cup qualification – AFC first round
2	8 December 1995	Thailand	Cambodia	1–0	4–0	1995 Southeast Asian Games
3	8 December 1995	Thailand	Cambodia	3–0	4–0	1995 Southeast Asian Games
4	4 August 1996	Ho Chi Minh City, Vietnam	Chinese Taipei	4–1	4–1	1996 AFC Asian Cup qualification
5	7 September 1996	Jurong Statdium, Jurong, Singapore	Myanmar	4–1	4–1	1996 AFF Championship
6	13 September 1996	National Stadium, Kallang, Singapore	Thailand	2–4	2–4	1996 AFF Championship
7	26 August 1998	Hàng Đẫy Stadium, Hanoi, Vietnam	Laos	1–0	4–1	1998 AFF Championship
8	30 August 1998	Hàng Đẫy Stadium, Hanoi, Vietnam	Malaysia	1–0	1–0	1998 AFF Championship
9	3 September 1998	Hàng Đẫy Stadium, Hanoi, Vietnam	Thailand	2–0	3–0	1998 AFF Championship
10	12 August 1999	Hassanal Bolkiah National Stadium, Bandar Seri Begawan, Brunei	Indonesia	1–0	1–0	1999 Southeast Asian Games
11	25 August 2000	Vietnam	Sri Lanka	1–1 (pen.)	2–2	Friendly
12	7 November 2000	Tinsulanon Stadium, Songkhla, Thailand	Cambodia	3–0	6–0	2000 AFF Championship
13	16 November 2000	Rajamangala Stadium, Bangkok, Thailand	Indonesia	1–1	2–3	2000 AFF Championship
14	10 February 2001	Prince Mohamed bin Fahd Stadium, Dammam, Saudi Arabia	Mongolia	1–0 (pen.)	1–0	2002 FIFA World Cup qualification – AFC first round
15	15 February 2001	Prince Mohamed bin Fahd Stadium, Dammam, Saudi Arabia	Bangladesh	2–0	4–0	2002 FIFA World Cup qualification – AFC first round
16	15 February 2001	Prince Mohamed bin Fahd Stadium, Dammam, Saudi Arabia	Bangladesh	4–0 (pen.)	4–0	2002 FIFA World Cup qualification – AFC first round
17	17 February 2001	Prince Mohamed bin Fahd Stadium, Dammam, Saudi Arabia	Mongolia	2–0	4–0	2002 FIFA World Cup qualification – AFC first round
18	17 February 2001	Prince Mohamed bin Fahd Stadium, Dammam, Saudi Arabia	Mongolia	3–0	4–0	2002 FIFA World Cup qualification – AFC first round

== Honour ==
Vietnam

- ASEAN Football Championship
  - Runner Up: 1998 Tiger Cup
  - Third Place: 1996 Tiger Cup
  - Fourth Place: 2000 Tiger Cup
- SEA Games
  - Silver Medal: 1995 & 1999
  - Bronze Medal: 1997

The Cong

- V-League
  - Champion: 1990 & 1998
- Vietnamese Super Cup
  - Champion: 1998

Personal awards

- Vietnamese Golden Ball: 1998 & 2001
- Top scorer V-League: 1990
- MVP: 1998 Tiger Cup
- Best player in Asia: August 1998
