= List of Asian Super Cup goalscorers =

This article lists every club's goalscorers in the Asian Super Cup.

== Overall top goalscorers ==
Players with at least 2 goals in the Asian Super Cup
Rank	Player	Team	Goals scored	Year(s)
1	(Colombia) Ricardo Pérez	(Saudi Arabia) Al-Hilal	3	2000, 2002
2	(Saudi Arabia) Sami Al-Jaber	(Saudi Arabia) Al-Hilal	2	1997
2	(South Korea) Han Jung-kook	(South Korea) Cheonan Ilhwa Chunma	2	1996
2	(South Korea) Lee Ki-bum	(South Korea) Cheonan Ilhwa Chunma	2	1996
2	(Japan) Masashi Nakayama	(Japan) Júbilo Iwata	2	1999
2	(Thailand) Natipong Sritong-In	(Thailand) Thai Farmers Bank	2	1995
2	(South Korea) Lee Ki-Hyung	(South Korea) Suwon Samsung Bluewings	2	2001, 2002

== Goalscorers by club ==
=== Al-Hilal ===
Player	Goals	1997	2000	2002
(Colombia) Ricardo Pérez	3		2	1
(Saudi Arabia) Sami Al-Jaber	2	2		
(Saudi Arabia) Omar Al-Ghamdi	1		1	
Total	6	2	3	1

=== Al-Ittihad ===
Player	Goals	1999
(Saudi Arabia) Hasan Al Yami	1	1
(Saudi Arabia) Mohammad Haider	1	1
Total	2	2

=== Al-Nassr ===
Player	Goals	1998
(Saudi Arabia) Al-Huseini	1	1
Total	1	1

=== Al-Shabab ===
Player	Goals	2001
(Saudi Arabia) Abdullah Al-Waked	1	1
(Saudi Arabia) Omar Hassi	1	1
(Saudi Arabia) Abdullah Shehan	1	1
Total	3	3

=== Cheonan Ilhwa Chunma ===
Player	Goals	1996
(South Korea) Han Jung-kook	2	2
(South Korea) Lee Ki-bum	2	2
(South Korea) Lee Sang-yoon	1	1
Total	5	5

=== Júbilo Iwata ===
Player	Goals	1999
(Japan) Masashi Nakayama	2	2
Total	2	2

=== Pohang Steelers ===
Player	Goals	1997	1998
(South Korea) Seo Hyo-won	2	1	1
Total	2	1	1

=== Shonan Bellmare ===
Player	Goals	1996
(Japan) Kazuaki Tasaka	1	1
(Japan) Koji Noguchi	1	1
Total	2	2

=== Shimizu S-Pulse ===
Player	Goals	2000
(Brazil) Carlos dos Santos	1	1
(Japan) Daisuke Ichikawa	1	1
Total	2	2

=== Suwon Samsung Bluewings ===
Player	Goals	2001	2002
(South Korea) Lee Ki-Hyung	2	1	1
Total	2	1	1

=== Thai Farmers Bank ===
Player	Goals	1995
(Thailand) Natipong Sritong-In	2	2
(Thailand) Phanuwat Yinphan	1	1
Total	3	3

=== Yokohama Flügels ===
Player	Goals	1995
(Brazil) Evair	1	1
(Japan) Motohiro Yamaguchi	1	1
(Japan) Takayuki Yoshida	1	1
(Brazil) Zinho	1	1
Total	4	4

== See also ==
- List of Intercontinental Cup goalscorers
