= Cho Jae-min =

South Korean footballer

Cho Jae-Min
Personal information
- Date of birth: 22 May 1978 (age 48)
- Place of birth: South Korea
- Height: 1.80 m (5 ft 11 in)
- Position: Defensive midfielder

Team information
- Current team: Suwon Samsung Bluewings

Youth career
- 1994–1996: Joongdong High School

Senior career*
Years	Team	Apps	(Gls)
1997–2006	Suwon Samsung Bluewings	35	(0)
2007	Daejeon Citizen	17	(0)
Total		52	(0)

Managerial career
- 2007: Suwon Samsung Bluewings U-18 (coach)
- 2009: Suwon Samsung Bluewings (scout)
- 2010: Suwon Samsung Bluewings U-18
- 2011–: Suwon Samsung Bluewings (scout)
- * Club domestic league appearances and goals as of 16 December 2012

Cho Jae-Min (Korean: 조재민; born 22 May 1978) is a South Korean footballer.

== Honours ==
=== Club ===
Suwon Samsung Bluewings

- K-League (3): 1998, 1999, 2004
- K-League Cup (5): 1999, 1999S, 2000, 2001, 2005
- Korean FA Cup (1): 2002
- Korean Super Cup (3): 1999, 2000, 2005
- AFC Champions League (2): 2000–01, 2001–02
- Asian Super Cup (2): 2001, 2002
- A3 Champions Cup (1): 2005
