= List of Shimizu S-Pulse records and statistics =

This article contains records and statistics for the Japanese professional football club, Shimizu S-Pulse.

== J.League ==
Year	League	Place	GP	Pts	Win	Draw	Lose	Average Crowd
1993	J1 1st stage	4 / 10	18	-	11	-	7	18,462
1993	J1 2nd stage	Runners-up / 10	18	-	14	-	4	18,462
1993	J1 Total	3 / 10	36	-	25	-	11	18,462
1994	J1 1st stage	Runners-up / 12	22	-	16	-	6	19,726
1994	J1 2nd stage	6 / 12	22	-	11	-	11	19,726
1994	J1 Total	4 / 12	44	-	27	-	17	19,726
1995	J1 1st stage	12 / 14	26	30	10	-	16	19,747
1995	J1 2nd stage	4 / 14	26	45	15	-	11	19,747
1995	J1 Total	9 / 14	52	75	25	-	27	19,747
1996	J1	10 / 16	30	37	12	-	18	12,962
1997	J1 1st stage	7 / 17	16	25	9	-	7	9,888
1997	J1 2nd stage	6 / 17	16	29	10	-	6	9,888
1997	J1 Total	5 / 17	32	54	19	-	13	9,888
1998	J1 1st stage	Runners-up / 18	17	39	13	-	4	12,298
1998	J1 2nd stage	5 / 18	17	31	12	-	5	12,298
1998	J1 Total	3 / 18	34	70	25	-	9	12,298
1999	J1 1st stage	3 / 16	15	30	10	1	4	12,883
1999	J1 2nd stage	Champions / 16	15	33	11	1	3	12,883
1999	J1 Total	Runners-up / 16	30	63	21	2	7	12,883
2000	J1 1st stage	3 / 16	15	28	10	0	5	12,422
2000	J1 2nd stage	13 / 16	15	14	5	2	8	12,422
2000	J1 Total	8 / 16	30	42	15	2	13	12,422
2001	J1 1st stage	4 / 16	15	26	10	0	5	15,973
2001	J1 2nd stage	4 / 16	15	23	9	0	6	15,973
2001	J1 Total	4 / 16	30	49	19	0	11	15,973
2002	J1 1st stage	7 / 16	15	24	8	3	4	14,963
2002	J1 2nd stage	12 / 16	15	17	6	0	9	14,963
2002	J1 Total	8 / 16	30	41	14	3	13	14,963
2003	J1 1st stage	11 / 16	15	18	5	3	7	16,284
2003	J1 2nd stage	10 / 16	15	21	6	3	6	16,284
2003	J1 Total	11 / 16	30	39	11	6	13	16,284
2004	J1 1st stage	11 / 16	15	16	3	7	5	13,568
2004	J1 2nd stage	14 / 16	15	13	4	1	10	13,568
2004	J1 Total	14 / 16	30	29	7	8	15	13,568
2005	J1	15 / 18	34	39	9	12	13	12,752
2006	J1	4 / 18	34	60	18	6	10	14,302
2007	J1	4 / 18	34	61	18	7	9	15,952
2008	J1	5 / 18	34	55	16	7	11	16,599
2009	J1	7 / 18	34	51	13	12	9	17,935
2010	J1	6 / 18	34	54	15	9	10	18,001
2011	J1	10 / 18	34	45	11	12	11	15,801
2012	J1	9 / 18	34	49	14	7	13	15,121
2013	J1	9 / 18	34	50	15	5	14	14,137
2014	J1	15 / 18	34	54	10	6	18	14,210
2015	J1 1st stage	18 / 18	17	13	3	4	10	,
2015	J1 2nd stage	/ 18	17					,
2015	J1 total	/ 18	34					,

== Domestic cup competitions ==
Year	Emperor's Cup	J.League Cup	Super Cup
1992	Quarter-finals	Runners-up	-
1993	Semi-finals	Runners-up	-
1994	1st Round	1st Round	-
1995	1st Round	Not Held	-
1996	Quarter-finals	Champions	-
1997	Quarter-finals	Group Stage	-
1998	Runners-up	Semi-finals	-
1999	Quarter-finals	Quarter-finals	Runners-up
2000	Runners-up	Quarter-finals	-
2001	Champions	2nd Round	Champions
2002	Quarter-finals	Semi-finals	Champions
2003	Semi-finals	Semi-finals	-
2004	4th Round	Quarter-finals	-
2005	Runners-up	Quarter-finals	-
2006	Quarter-finals	Group Stage	-
2007	Quarter-finals	Group Stage	-
2008	Quarter-finals	Runners-up	-
2009	Semi-finals	Semi-finals	-
2010	Runner-up	Semi-finals	-
2011	Semi-finals	Quarterfinals	-
2012	Runner-up	4th Round	-
2013	Group Stage	4th Round	-
2014	Group Stage	Semi-finals	-
2015	Group Stage	2nd Round	-

== International Competitions ==
Season	Competition	Result
1999-00	Asian Cup Winners Cup	Champions
2000	Asian Super Cup	Runners-up
2000-01	Asian Cup Winners Cup	3rd
2001-02	Asian Cup Winners Cup	Quarter-finals
2002-03	AFC Champions League	Round 1

== Top scorers by season ==
Season	Player	Domestic league	Ref
2010	(Japan) Shinji Okazaki	13	
2011	(Japan) Genki Omae	8	
2012	(Japan) Genki Omae	13	
2013	(Japan) Genki Omae	7	
2014	(Slovenia) Milivoje Novaković	7	
