= List of Kashima Antlers records and statistics =

This article contains records and statistics for the Japanese professional football club, Kashima Antlers.

== J.League ==
Season	League	Place	GP	Pts	Win	Draw	Lose	Average Crowd
1993	J1 1st stage	Champions / 10	18	-	13	-	5	14,016
1993	J1 2nd stage	4 / 10	18	-	10	-	8	14,016
1993	J1 Total	Runners-up / 10	36	-	23	-	13	14,016
1994	J1 1st stage	3 / 12	22	-	16	-	6	16,812
1994	J1 2nd stage	5 / 12	22	-	11	-	11	16,812
1994	J1 Total	3 / 12	44	-	27	-	17	16,812
1995	J1 1st stage	8 / 14	26	42	14	-	12	19,141
1995	J1 2nd stage	6 / 14	26	43	14	-	12	19,141
1995	J1 Total	7 / 14	52	85	28	-	24	19,141
1996	J1	Champions / 16	30	66	21	-	9	15,386
1997	J1 1st stage	Champions / 17	16	37	13	-	3	16,985
1997	J1 2nd stage	4 / 17	16	31	11	-	5	16,985
1997	J1 Total	Runners-up / 17	32	68	24	-	8	16,985
1998	J1 1st stage	5 / 18	17	32	11	-	6	15,345
1998	J1 2nd stage	Champions / 18	17	42	15	-	2	15,345
1998	J1 Total	Champions / 18	34	74	26	-	8	15,345
1999	J1 1st stage	9 / 16	15	18	6	1	8	17,049
1999	J1 2nd stage	6 / 16	15	22	8	0	7	17,049
1999	J1 Total	9 / 16	30	40	14	1	15	17,049
2000	J1 1st stage	8 / 16	15	22	8	0	7	17,507
2000	J1 2nd stage	Champions / 16	15	33	10	4	1	17,507
2000	J1 Total	Champions / 16	30	55	18	4	8	17,507
2001	J1 1st stage	11 / 16	15	18	6	1	8	22,425
2001	J1 2nd stage	Champions / 16	15	36	13	0	2	22,425
2001	J1 Total	Champions / 16	30	54	19	1	10	22,425
2002	J1 1st stage	5 / 16	15	27	9	0	6	21,590
2002	J1 2nd stage	3 / 16	15	26	9	0	6	21,590
2002	J1 Total	4 / 16	30	53	18	0	12	21,590
2003	J1 1st stage	8 / 16	15	23	7	2	6	21,204
2003	J1 2nd stage	4 / 16	15	25	6	7	2	21,204
2003	J1 Total	5 / 16	30	48	13	9	8	21,204
2004	J1 1st stage	5 / 16	15	24	7	3	5	17,585
2004	J1 2nd stage	4 / 16	15	24	7	3	5	17,585
2004	J1 Total	6 / 16	30	48	14	6	10	17,585
2005	J1	3 / 18	34	59	16	11	7	18,641
2006	J1	6 / 18	34	58	18	4	12	15,433
2007	J1	Champions / 18	34	72	22	6	6	16,239
2008	J1	Champions / 18	34	63	18	9	7	19,714
2009	J1	Champions / 18	34	66	20	6	8	21,617
2010	J1	4 / 18	34	60	16	12	6	20,966

== Domestic cup competitions ==
Year	Emperor's Cup	J. League Cup	Super Cup
1992	Quarter-finals	Semi-finals	-
1993	Runners-up	Group Stage	-
1994	1st Round	1st Round	-
1995	Semi-finals	Not Held	-
1996	Quarter-finals	Group Stage	-
1997	Champions	Champions	Champions
1998	Semi-finals	Semi-finals	Champions
1999	4th Round	Runners-up	Champions
2000	Champions	Champions	-
2001	Quarter-finals	Semi-finals	Runners-up
2002	Runners-up	Champions	Runners-up
2003	Semi-finals	Runners-up	-
2004	Quarter-finals	Quarter-finals	-
2005	Quarter-finals	Group Stage	-
2006	Semi-finals	Runners-up	-
2007	Champions	Semi-finals	-
2008	5th Round	Quarter-finals	Runners-up
2009	Quarter-finals	Quarter-finals	Champions
2010	Champions	Quarter-finals	Champions
2011			Runners-up

== Major international competitions ==
Season	Competition	Result
1997-98	Asian Club Championship	Quarter-finals
1998-99	Asian Cup Winners Cup	3rd
1999-00	Asian Club Championship	Quarter-finals
2001-02	Asian Club Championship	Quarter-finals
2002-03	AFC Champions League	Round 1
2003	A3 Champions Cup	Champions
2008	AFC Champions League	Quarter-finals
2009	AFC Champions League	Round of 16
2010	AFC Champions League	Round of 16

== Top scorers by season ==
Season	Player	Domestic league	Ref
2010	(Brazil) Marquinhos	11	
