= List of Júbilo Iwata records and statistics =

This article contains records and statistics for the Japanese professional football club, Júbilo Iwata.

== J. League ==
Year	League	Place	GP	Pts	Win	Draw	Lose	Average Crowd
1994	J1 1st stage	7 / 12	22	-	9	-	13	14,497
1994	J1 2nd stage	7 / 12	22	-	11	-	11	14,497
1994	J1 Total	8 / 12	44	-	20	-	24	14,497
1995	J1 1st stage	5 / 14	26	45	15	-	11	17,313
1995	J1 2nd stage	9 / 14	26	40	13	-	13	17,313
1995	J1 Total	6 / 14	52	85	28	-	24	17,313
1996	J1	4 / 16	30	62	20	-	10	13,792
1997	J1 1st stage	6 / 17	16	26	9	-	7	10,448
1997	J1 2nd stage	Champions / 17	16	40	14	-	2	10,448
1997	J1 Total	Champions / 17	32	66	23	-	9	10,448
1998	J1 1st stage	Champions / 18	17	39	13	-	4	12,867
1998	J1 2nd stage	Runners-up / 18	17	39	13	-	4	12,867
1998	J1 Total	Runners-up / 18	34	78	26	-	8	12,867
1999	J1 1st stage	Champions / 16	15	34	12	0	3	12,273
1999	J1 2nd stage	12 / 16	15	15	5	1	9	12,273
1999	J1 Total	Champions / 16	30	49	17	1	12	12,273
2000	J1 1st stage	5 / 16	15	25	9	0	6	12,534
2000	J1 2nd stage	3 / 16	15	30	10	0	5	12,534
2000	J1 Total	4 / 16	30	55	19	0	11	12,534
2001	J1 1st stage	Champions / 16	15	36	13	1	1	16,650
2001	J1 2nd stage	Runners-up / 16	15	35	13	0	2	16,650
2001	J1 Total	Runners-up / 16	30	71	26	1	3	16,650
2002	J1 1st stage	Champions / 16	15	36	13	1	1	16,564
2002	J1 2nd stage	Champions / 16	15	35	13	0	2	16,564
2002	J1 Total	Champions / 16	30	71	26	1	3	16,564
2003	J1 1st stage	Runners-up / 16	15	31	9	4	2	17,267
2003	J1 2nd stage	3 / 16	15	26	7	5	3	17,267
2003	J1 Total	Runners-up / 16	30	57	16	9	5	17,267
2004	J1 1st stage	Runners-up / 16	15	34	11	1	3	17,126
2004	J1 2nd stage	13 / 16	15	14	3	5	7	17,126
2004	J1 Total	5 / 16	30	48	14	6	10	17,126
2005	J1	6 / 18	34	51	14	9	11	18,652
2006	J1	5 / 18	34	58	17	7	10	18,002
2007	J1	9 / 18	34	49	15	4	15	16,359
2008	J1	16 / 18	34	37	10	7	17	15,465
2009	J1	11 / 18	34	41	11	8	15	13,523
2010	J1	11 / 18	34	44	11	11	12	12,137

== Domestic cup competitions ==
Year	Emperor's Cup	J. League Cup	Super Cup
1993	1st Round	Group Stage	-
1994	1st Round	Runners-up	-
1995	2nd Round	Not Held	-
1996	3rd Round	Group Stage	-
1997	Semi-finals	Runners-up	-
1998	Quarter-finals	Champions	Runners-up
1999	Quarter-finals	Quarter-finals	-
2000	Quarter-finals	Quarter-finals	Champions
2001	4th Round	Runners-up	-
2002	Quarter-finals	Quarter-finals	-
2003	Champions	Semi-finals	Champions
2004	Runners-up	Group Stage	Champions
2005	Quarter-finals	Quarter-finals	-
2006	Quarter-finals	Quarter-finals	-
2007	5th Round	Group Stage	-
2008	5th Round	Group Stage	-
2009	4th Round	Group Stage	-
2010	4th Round	Champions	-

== International Competitions ==
Season	Competition	Result	Average Crowd
1998-99	Asian Club Championship	Champions	?
1999	Asian Super Cup	Champions	?
1999-00	Asian Club Championship	Runners-up	?
2000-01	Asian Club Championship	Runners-up	?
2001	FIFA Club World Cup	Cancelled	-
2003	A3 Champions Cup	4th	-
2004	AFC Champions League	Round 1	?
2005	AFC Champions League	Round 1	?

== Top scorers by season ==
Season	Player	Domestic league	Ref
2010	(Japan) Ryoichi Maeda	17	

== Previous record as Yamaha Motor Corporation's team ==
Season	League	Pos	PTS	W	D	L	GF	GA	Manager
1974	Shizuoka Division 2	Champions	17	8	1	0	38	3	Ryuichi Sugiyama
1975	Shizuoka Division 1	Champions	29	14	1	0	61	3	Ryuichi Sugiyama
1976	Shizuoka Division 1	Champions	30	14	2	0	?	?	Ryuichi Sugiyama
1977	Tokai League	Champions	23	11	1	1	43	6	Ryuichi Sugiyama
1978	Tokai League	Champions	26	13	0	0	60	4	Ryuichi Sugiyama
1979	JSL Division 2	2nd	47	10	2PK win, 3PK loss	3	33	19	Ryuichi Sugiyama
1980	JSL Division 1	9th	13	5	3	10	28	39	Ryuichi Sugiyama
1981	JSL Division 1	10th	10	2	6	10	11	28	Ryuichi Sugiyama
1982	JSL Division 2	Champions	29	12	5	1	35	11	Ryuichi Sugiyama
1983	JSL Division 1	4th	19	7	5	6	25	20	Ryuichi Sugiyama
1984	JSL Division 1	3rd	24	10	4	4	28	16	Ryuichi Sugiyama
1985-86	JSL Division 1	6th	23	9	5	8	20	21	Ryuichi Sugiyama
1986-87	JSL Division 1	10th	17	3	11	8	11	22	Ryuichi Sugiyama
1987-88	JSL Division 1	Champions	34	12	10	0	27	10	Kikuo Konagaya
1988-89	JSL Division 1	3rd	39	12	3	7	31	21	Kikuo Konagaya
1989-90	JSL Division 1	5th	34	9	7	6	23	19	Kikuo Konagaya
1990-91	JSL Division 1	8th	25	6	7	9	21	22	Kikuo Konagaya
1991-92	JSL Division 1	3rd^{1}	36	11	3	8	30	31	Kazuaki Nagasawa
1992	JFL Division 1	Champions	44	13	5	0	37	6	Kazuaki Nagasawa
1993	JFL Division 1	2nd	_	14（2AET, 3PK）	_	4（0AET, 0PK）	31	15	Kazuaki Nagasawa

^{1}Not chosen for new J. League, so a de facto relegation.
