= Zoltan Sabo =

Serbian footballer (1972–2020)

Personal information
- Date of birth: 26 May 1972
- Place of birth: Sombor, SR Serbia, SFR Yugoslavia
- Date of death: 15 December 2020 (aged 48)
- Place of death: Sremska Kamenica, Serbia
- Height: 1.83 m (6 ft 0 in)
- Position: Defender

Youth career
- Jedinstvo Svetozar Miletić
- Radnički Sombor

Senior career*
Years	Team	Apps	(Gls)
1991–1992	Hajduk Kula	31	(1)
1992–1996	Vojvodina	114	(2)
1996–2000	Partizan	67	(1)
2000–2002	Suwon Samsung Bluewings	35	(0)
2002	Avispa Fukuoka	17	(1)
2003	Zalaegerszeg	12	(2)
2003–2004	AEK Larnaca	20	(4)
2004	Mladost Apatin	4	(0)
2005–2008	Cement Beočin	83	(1)
Total		383	(12)

Managerial career
- 2007–2009: Kecskemét (assistant)
- 2009–2011: Radnički Sombor
- 2011–2012: Hajduk Kula
- 2012: Vojvodina (assistant)
- 2013–2014: Litex Lovech (assistant)
- 2014–2015: Donji Srem (assistant)
- 2015: Vojvodina (assistant)
- 2016: Proleter Novi Sad
- 2016: Jagodina
- 2016–2017: Proleter Novi Sad
- 2018–2020: TSC
- * Club domestic league appearances and goals

Zoltan Sabo (Serbian Cyrillic: Золтан Сабо; Hungarian: Szabó Zoltán; 26 May 1972 – 15 December 2020) was a Serbian professional football player and manager. During his playing career, he was a defender. He also held Hungarian citizenship.

== Playing career ==
In 1991, Sabo began his playing career at Hajduk Kula, newly promoted to the Yugoslav Second League. In his first senior career, he contributed to Hajduk's promotion to the First League of FR Yugoslavia. Prior to the next season, he transferred to another First League club Vojvodina.

In 1996, Sabo moved to Partizan at the same league. While playing for Partizan for four years, he won two First League titles and one FR Yugoslavia Cup title.

In 2000, Sabo joined K League club Suwon Samsung Bluewings. Suwon registered his name as "Zoli", hoping he would successfully replace their previous defender Cosmin Olăroiu, called "Oli". He was named the Most Valuable Player at the 2000–01 Asian Club Championship after helping the club win the tournament. In 2002, he left for J2 League club Avispa Fukuoka.

During the 2003–04 season, Sabo played for Cypriot First Division club AEK Larnaca, winning the Cypriot Cup.

== Managerial career ==
After a stint as assistant coach to Tomislav Sivić at Nemzeti Bajnokság II champions Kecskemét, Sabo began his managerial career at the helm of his hometown club Radnički Sombor in October 2009. He spent the next two years at the position before leaving the side in November 2011. A month later, Sabo was appointed manager at Hajduk Kula.

Between 2013 and 2015, Sabo worked as assistant coach to Zlatomir Zagorčić at Litex Lovech of Bulgaria's top division, A Group, and two Serbian SuperLiga clubs, namely Donji Srem and Vojvodina. On 16 January 2016, he restarted his managerial career at Serbian First League club Proleter Novi Sad.

After performing the role of a director at First League club TSC for a while, Sabo was promoted to a manager on 21 August 2018. In the 2018–19 season, he won the First League title, leading the club to be promoted to the SuperLiga. The next season, his team finished fourth at the SuperLiga, qualifying for the UEFA Europa League.

== Death ==
Sabo died of a heart attack on 15 December 2020, aged 48, after suffering from COVID-19.

== Honours ==
=== Player ===
Partizan

- First League of FR Yugoslavia: 1996–97, 1998–99
- FR Yugoslavia Cup: 1997–98

Suwon Samsung Bluewings (Note: Several sources claimed Sabo won the 2000 K League Super Cup and the 2001–02 Asian Club Championship, but there is no evidence that he belonged to Suwon Samsung Bluewings when the two competitions were held.)

- Asian Club Championship: 2000–01
- Asian Super Cup: 2001
- Korean League Cup: 2000, 2001

AEK Larnaca

- Cypriot Cup: 2003–04

Individual

- Asian Club Championship Most Valuable Player: 2000–01

=== Manager ===
TSC

- Serbian First League: 2018–19
