= Omar Al-Ghamdi =

Saudi Arabian footballer

Personal information
- Full name: Omar Abdullah Al-Ghamdi
- Date of birth: 11 April 1979 (age 47)
- Place of birth: Mecca, Saudi Arabia
- Height: 1.76 m (5 ft 9 1/2 in)
- Position: Defensive midfielder

Youth career
- 1995–1999: Al Hilal

Senior career*
Years	Team	Apps	(Gls)
1998–2010	Al Hilal		
2010–2015	Al-Shabab	78	(0)

International career^{‡}
2000–2008	Saudi Arabia	78	(0)
- * Club domestic league appearances and goals as of 13 August 2017 ‡ National team caps and goals as of 13 August 2017

Omar Abdullah Al-Ghamdi (Arabic: عُمَر عَبْد الله الْغَامِدِيّ; born 11 April 1979) is a retired Saudi Arabian football player who played as defensive midfielder and played at left back.

== Club career ==
=== Al-Hilal ===
In 1997, Al Hilal signed Omar Al-Ghamdi, he was part of Al-Hilal team that won the Asian Super Cup and Asian Champions League in 2000. He won every trophy at Al-Hilal. On 14 March 2010, Omar played his last match for Al-Hilal which was against Al Shabab which ended 2–1 win for Al-Hilal. He left in 2010.

=== Al-Shabab ===
On 21 June 2010, Omar went to Al Shabab from Al Hilal as part of a swap deal which Al-Hilal got Waleed Al-Gizani from Al-Shabab. On 14 August 2010, he played his league debut against Al-Raed which Al-Shabab lost 2–1. On 29 September 2011, Omar made his first assist for Al-Shabab against Al-Raed which he assisted Hassan Muath in the 40th minute which was a reason why they won 2–1. On 30 November 2011, Omar assisted Fahad Hamad in the 61 minute which made Al-Shabab win 1–0 against Al-Ettifaq. On 2 February 2012, Omar was sent off against Ittihad in the 38 minute for a second yellow card, but Al-Shabab still won 2–0. In 2012, he won the first and only Saudi Professional League for Al-Shabab. In 2014, Omar won the King Cup and the Super Cup for Al-Shabab. On 26 March 2017, Omar announced that he will retire at the end of the season. On 17 April 2015, Omar played his last league match against Al-Taawoun which Al-Shabab drew 1-1. On 23 August 2015, Omar officially retired from football after a playing career that lasted 17 years.

== International career ==
Omar made his play debut for the Saudi Arabia national team at the 2000 AFC Asian Cup. He is a member of the Saudi Arabia national team and was called up to the squad for the 2002 FIFA World Cup and 2006 FIFA World Cup. On 6 September 2008, Omar played his last match for the national team which was against Iran which he replaced Mohammad Al-Shalhoub in the 67th minute, the match ended 1-1. After 78 caps for the Saudi national team, he retired in 2008.

== Hounors ==
=== Club ===
==== Al-Hilal ====
- Saudi Professional League (4): 1997–98, 2001–02, 2004–05, 2009–10
- Saudi Crown Prince Cup (7): 1999–2000, 2002–03, 2004–05, 2005–06, 2007–08, 2008–09, 2009–10
- Prince Faisal bin Fahd Cup (3): 2000, 2005, 2006
- Saudi Founder's Cup (1): 1999
- AFC Champions League (1): 1999–2000
- Asian Cup Winners' Cup (1): 2001–02
- Asian Super Cup (1): 2000

==== Al-Shabab ====
- Saudi Professional League (1): 2011–12
- Saudi Super Cup (1): 2014
- King Cup (1): 2014
