= Seo Jung-won =

South Korean footballer (born 1970)

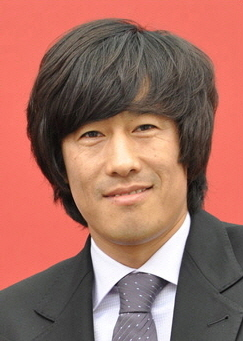

Personal information
- Full name: Seo Jung-won
- Date of birth: 17 December 1970 (age 55)
- Place of birth: Gwangju, Gyeonggi, South Korea
- Height: 1.73 m (5 ft 8 in)
- Position: Winger

Team information
- Current team: Liaoning Tieren (head coach)

College career
Years	Team	Apps	(Gls)
1988–1991	Korea University		

Senior career*
Years	Team	Apps	(Gls)
1992–1997	Anyang LG Cheetahs	66	(13)
1994–1995	→ Sangmu FC (draft)		
1998	Strasbourg	16	(4)
1999–2004	Suwon Samsung Bluewings	143	(36)
2005	Austria Salzburg	12	(2)
2005–2007	SV Ried	55	(9)
Total		292	(64)

International career
1988	South Korea U20	1	(1)
1991–1992	South Korea U23	20 (Note: Includes five appearances and three goals considered non-international.)	(10)
1990–2001	South Korea	88	(16)

Managerial career
- 2013–2018: Suwon Samsung Bluewings
- 2021–2025: Chengdu Rongcheng
- 2026–: Liaoning Tieren
Medal record
Representing South Korea
Men's football
Asian Games
Bronze medal – third place	1990 Beijing
- * Club domestic league appearances and goals

- Seo Jung-won
- Hangul: 서정원
- Hanja: 徐正源
- RR: Seo Jeongwon
- MR: Sŏ Chŏngwŏn

Seo Jung-won (born 17 December 1970) is a South Korean football manager and former player, who is the head coach of Chinese Super League club Liaoning Tieren.

== Playing career ==
A winger who had explosive pace, Seo was nicknamed the "Nalssaendori", which means an agile man in Korean. He played for South Korean under-23 team in the 1992 Summer Olympics in Barcelona, and scored against Sweden. He was reportedly offered a contract from FC Barcelona and other European club giants after his performances in the Olympics, but he stayed South Korea to serve a two-year mandatory military service. He also played for South Korea in the 1994 FIFA World Cup, and scored the equaliser in a 2–2 draw with Spain.

After serving in Sangmu FC, Seo longed to play in Europe and left for Germany and the Netherlands to participate in tryouts. In the summer of 1997, he succeeded to contract with Portuguese club Benfica and played four pre-season games for them. However, the Korea Football Association didn't approve of his overseas employment to qualify for the 1998 FIFA World Cup with him.

In January 1998, Seo joined French club Strasbourg, becoming the first South Korean, and fourth Asian to play in the Ligue 1. He successfully spent his first season by contributing to their survival in the Ligue 1, but he was pushed to the bench the next season after his manager was replaced. In summer, he participated in the 1998 FIFA World Cup, although he got chickenpox transferred from his son. He showed unnoticeable performance during South Korea's elimination in the group stage.

In February 1999, he returned to South Korea and joined Suwon Samsung Bluewings. He led Suwon to 12 trophies including two Asian Club Championships for six years. Lastly, he played for Austria Salzburg and SV Ried in Austria. While playing in Austrian Bundesliga, he was evaluated as the best footballer in Austria by two media Kurier and Sportwoche.

== Managerial career ==
After South Korea's head coach Pim Verbeek resigned in July 2007, Seo entered the list for the vacant managerial position for the national team. From 2009 to 2010, he and his former national teammate and close friend, Hong Myung-bo, worked together as a part of the coaching staff for the South Korea under-20 and under-23 team. In 2010, Seo joined the coaching staff of the senior team under manager Cho Kwang-rae. Since 2012, he has been a member of the coaching staff of the Suwon Samsung Bluewings, becoming the club's manager in 2013. Under his tenure, the Bluewings finished the 2014 and 2015 seasons as runner-ups and won the Korean FA Cup in 2016. The FA Cup Final was notable as it featured Suwon Samsung Bluewings and FC Seoul, one of the biggest K League rivalries. The match went into extra time after FC Seoul scored a goal in the 93rd minute, leveling the aggregate score to 3–3 over two legs. After a scoreless extra time period, the final was decided over penalties where Suwon Samsung Bluewings won 10–9. This was Seo's first silverware of his managing career.

== Personal life ==
Seo married in 1995 and has three sons. His third son Seo Dong-han also became a forward of Suwon Samsung Bluewings.

== Career statistics ==
=== Club ===
Appearances and goals by club, season and competition
Club	Season	League			National cup		League cup		Continental		Total	
Club	Season	Division	Apps	Goals	Apps	Goals	Apps	Goals	Apps	Goals	Apps	Goals
Anyang LG Cheetahs	1992	K League	16	3	—		5	1	—		21	4
Anyang LG Cheetahs	1993	K League	9	2	—		2	0	—		11	2
Anyang LG Cheetahs	1994	K League	4	1	—		0	0	—		4	1
Anyang LG Cheetahs	1995	K League	4	0	—		0	0	—		4	0
Anyang LG Cheetahs	1996	K League	27	6	0	0	0	0	—		27	6
Anyang LG Cheetahs	1997	K League	6	1	4	4	11	8	—		21	13
Anyang LG Cheetahs	Total		66	13	4	4	18	9	—		88	26
Sangmu FC (draft)	1994	National Semipro League							—			
Sangmu FC (draft)	1995	National Semipro League							—			
Sangmu FC (draft)	Total								—			
Strasbourg	1997–98	French Division 1	12	4	1	0	0	0	0	0	13	4
Strasbourg	1998–99	French Division 1	4	0	1	1	1	0	—		6	1
Strasbourg	Total		16	4	2	1	1	0	0	0	19	5
Suwon Samsung Bluewings	1999	K League	15	7			12	4			27	11
Suwon Samsung Bluewings	2000	K League	22	2			3	2			25	4
Suwon Samsung Bluewings	2001	K League	25	11			8	0			33	11
Suwon Samsung Bluewings	2002	K League	23	5			9	4			32	9
Suwon Samsung Bluewings	2003	K League	43	10	0	0	—		—		43	10
Suwon Samsung Bluewings	2004	K League	15	1	1	0	10	0	—		26	1
Suwon Samsung Bluewings	Total		143	36	1	0	42	10			186	46
Austria Salzburg	2004–05	Austrian Bundesliga	12	2	1	0	—		—		13	2
SV Ried	2005–06	Austrian Bundesliga	28	7	1	0	—		—		29	7
SV Ried	2006–07	Austrian Bundesliga	27	2	1	0	—		6	2	34	4
SV Ried	Total		55	9	2	0	—		6	2	63	11
Career total			292	64	10	5	61	19	6	2	369	90

=== International ===
Results list South Korea's goal tally first.

List of international goals scored by Seo Jung-won
No.	Date	Venue	Opponent	Score	Result	Competition
1	8 September 1990	Busan, South Korea	Australia	1–0	1–0	Friendly
2	23 September 1990	Beijing, China	Singapore	4–0	7–0	1990 Asian Games
3	23 September 1990	Beijing, China	Singapore	7–0	7–0	1990 Asian Games
4	27 September 1990	Beijing, China	China	1–0	2–0	1990 Asian Games
5	27 September 1990	Beijing, China	China	2–0	2–0	1990 Asian Games
6	28 April 1993	Ulsan, South Korea	Iraq	2–1	2–2	Friendly
7	15 May 1993	Beirut, Lebanon	Hong Kong	2–0	3–0	1994 FIFA World Cup qualification
8	19 June 1993	Seoul, South Korea	Egypt	1–2	1–2	1993 Korea Cup
9	24 September 1993	Seoul, South Korea	Australia	1–1	1–1	Friendly
10	17 June 1994	Dallas, United States	Spain	2–2	2–2	1994 FIFA World Cup
11	15 October 1994	Hiroshima, Japan	Kuwait	1–0	1–2	1994 Asian Games
12	25 September 1996	Seoul, South Korea	China	1–1	3–1	Friendly
13	22 February 1997	Hong Kong	Hong Kong	1–0	2–0	1998 FIFA World Cup qualification
14	14 June 1997	Suwon, South Korea	Ghana	1–0	3–0	1997 Korea Cup
15	16 June 1997	Seoul, South Korea	FR Yugoslavia	1–0	1–1	1997 Korea Cup
16	28 September 1997	Tokyo, Japan	Japan	1–1	2–1	1998 FIFA World Cup qualification

== Managerial statistics ==
As of 18 December 2025

Managerial record by team and tenure
Team	From	To	Record					
Team	From	To	Pld	W	D	L	Win %	Ref.
Suwon Samsung Bluewings	12 December 2012	28 August 2018	265	113	82	70	42.64	
Suwon Samsung Bluewings	15 October 2018	2 December 2018	9	1	3	5	11.11	
Chengdu Rongcheng	12 December 2020	18 December 2025	183	102	45	36	55.74	
Total			458	217	130	111	47.38	

== Honours ==
=== Player ===
Anyang LG Cheetahs

- Korean League Cup runner-up: 1992

Sangmu FC

- Korean National Semipro League (Spring): 1994

Suwon Samsung Bluewings

- K League 1: 1999, 2004
- Korean FA Cup: 2002
- Korean League Cup: 1999+, 2000, 2001
- Korean Super Cup: 1999, 2000
- Asian Club Championship: 2000–01, 2001–02
- Asian Super Cup: 2001, 2002

SV Ried

- UEFA Intertoto Cup: 2006

South Korea

- Asian Games bronze medal: 1990
- Dynasty Cup: 1990

Individual

- Asian Games top goalscorer: 1990
- Korean League Cup top goalscorer: 1997
- K League All-Star: 1997, 1999, 2001, 2003
- K League 1 Best XI: 1999, 2001, 2002
- Asian Super Cup Most Valuable Player: 2001
- Korean FA Cup Most Valuable Player: 2002
- K League 30th Anniversary Best XI: 2013

=== Manager ===
Suwon Samsung Bluewings

- Korean FA Cup: 2016

Individual

- K League Manager of the Month: July 2017
- Chinese Super League Coach of the Month: May 2023, October/November 2023, April 2025, August 2025

== Notes ==
Sporting positions
Preceded by Park Kun-ha	Suwon Samsung Bluewings captain 2002	Succeeded by Kim Jin-woo
