= 1996 Asian Super Cup =

- Event: 1996 Asian Super Cup
Cheonan Ilhwa Chunma	Bellmare Hiratsuka
6	3

First leg
Cheonan Ilhwa Chunma	Bellmare Hiratsuka
5	3
- Date: 31 July 1996

Second leg
Bellmare Hiratsuka	Cheonan Ilhwa Chunma
0	1
- Date: 7 August 1996
- Venue: Mitsuzawa Stadium, Yokohama, Japan

The 1996 Asian Super Cup was the 2nd Asian Super Cup, a football match played between the winners of the previous season's Asian Club Championship and Asian Cup Winners Cup competitions. The 1996 competition was contested by Cheonan Ilhwa Chunma of South Korea, who won the 1995 Asian Club Championship, and Bellmare Hiratsuka of Japan, the winners of the 1995–96 Asian Cup Winners' Cup.

== Route to the Super Cup ==
=== Cheonan Ilhwa Chunma ===
Opponents	Round	Score^{1}	Ilhwa Chunma goalscorers
(Macau) GD Lam Pak	First round	8–0^{2}	?
(Malaysia) Pahang FA	Second round	5–2	?
(Thailand) Thai Farmers Bank FC	Quarterfinals	1–1	?
(Indonesia) Persib Bandung	Quarterfinals	5–2	?
(Japan) Verdy Kawasaki	Quarterfinals	1–0	?
(Iran) Saipa	Semifinals	1–0 (AET)	Lee Kwang-Hyun 104'
(Saudi Arabia) Al-Nasr	Final	1–0 (AET)	Lee Tae-Hong 110'

^{1}Ilhwa Chunma goals always recorded first.
^{2} GD Lam Pak withdrew after the 1st leg.

=== Bellmare Hiratsuka ===
Opponents	Round	Score^{1}	Bellmare Hiratsuka goalscorers
(Malaysia) Sabah FA	Second round	7–1	?
(Indonesia) Petrokimia Putra	Quarterfinals	7–0	?
(Japan) Yokohama Flügels	Semifinals	4–3 (AET)	Evair 56', 89' (pen.), Mitsuoka 83'
(Iraq) Al Talaba	Final	2–1	Narahashi 27', Nakata 81'

^{1}Bellmare Hiratsuka goals always recorded first.

== Match summary ==
Team 1	Agg.	Team 2	1st leg	2nd leg
Cheonan Ilhwa Chunma (South Korea)	6–3	(Japan) Bellmare Hiratsuka	5–3	1–0

=== First leg ===
31 July 1996

Cheonan Ilhwa Chunma (South Korea)	5–3	(Japan) Bellmare Hiratsuka
Lee Ki-bum 4', 46'; Han Jung-kook 7', 37'; Lee Sang-yoon 89'		Kazuaki Tasaka 50'; Koji Noguchi 52'

Changwon Stadium

=== Second leg ===
7 August 1996

Bellmare Hiratsuka (Japan)	0–1	(South Korea) Cheonan Ilhwa Chunma
		Shin Tae-yong 77'

Hiratsuka Athletics Stadium
