= 2001–02 Asian Cup Winners' Cup =

- The Jassim bin Hamad Stadium in Doha hosted the final

Tournament details
- Dates: 1 September 2001 – 30 March 2002
- Teams: 26
- Venue(s): Doha, Qatar (final rounds)

Final positions
- Champions: (Saudi Arabia) Al Hilal (2nd title)
- Runners-up: (South Korea) Jeonbuk Hyundai Motors
- Third place: (Qatar) Al-Sadd
- Fourth place: (China) Chongqing Longxin

Tournament statistics
- Matches played: 42
- Goals scored: 135 (3.21 per match)

The 2001–02 Asian Cup Winners' Cup was the twelfth and final season of the competition, as the AFC merged the Asian Club Championship, Asian Cup Winners' Cup and Asian Super Cup to form the AFC Champions League.

Al Hilal won their record-equaling second Asian Cup Winners' Cup title, beating Jeonbuk Hyundai Motors over two legs in the final. As winners, Al Hilal earned the right to play against 2001–02 Asian Club Championship winners Suwon Samsung Bluewings in the 2002 Asian Super Cup.

Al-Shabab were the defending champions, but were eliminated by Al Sadd in the second round.

== Teams ==
Entry Round	West Asia		East Asia	
Second Round	(Saudi Arabia) Al-Shabab^{TH}		(China) Chongqing Longxin	(Japan) Shimizu S-Pulse
Second Round			(Singapore) Home United	(South Korea) Jeonbuk Hyundai Motors
Second Round			(Thailand) Royal Thai Air Force	
First Round	(Iran) Fajr Sepasi	(Iraq) Al-Quwa Al-Jawiya	(Hong Kong) South China	(Indonesia) PSM Makassar
First Round	(Jordan) Al Wahdat	(Kyrgyzstan) SKA-PVO Bishkek	(Maldives) Victory	(Sri Lanka) Negombo Youth SC
First Round	(Kuwait) Al Salmiya	(Palestine) Al-Aqsa	(Vietnam) Công an	
First Round	(Qatar) Al Sadd	(Saudi Arabia) Al-Hilal		
First Round	(Syria) Tishreen	(Tajikistan) Regar-TadAZ Tursunzoda		
First Round	(Turkmenistan) Nisa Aşgabat	(United Arab Emirates) Al Ain		
First Round	(Uzbekistan) Pakhtakor Tashkent	(Yemen) Al-Sha'ab Hadramaut		

Location of the 2001–02 Asian Cup Winners Cup teams
Orange: First Round; Blue: Second Round;

== Bracket ==
First round
(Qatar) Al Sadd (p)	1	1	2 (5)
(Iran) Fajr Sepasi	1	1	2 (3)
(Yemen) Al-Sha'ab Hadramaut	3	0	3
(Jordan) Al Wahdat	2	5	7
(United Arab Emirates) Al Ain (w/o)	–	–	–
(Kuwait) Al Salmiya	–	–	–
(Kyrgyzstan) SKA-PVO Bishkek	2	1	3
(Uzbekistan) Pakhtakor Tashkent	1	3	4
(Turkmenistan) Nisa Aşgabat	1	1	2
(Tajikistan) Regar-TadAZ Tursunzoda	0	4	4
(Syria) Tishreen	2	1	3
(Saudi Arabia) Al-Hilal	3	1	4
(Palestine) Al-Aqsa (a)	1	3	4
(Iraq) Al-Quwa Al-Jawiya	0	4	4
(Maldives) Victory	3	1	4
(Indonesia) PSM Makassar	0	2	2
(Hong Kong) South China (w/o)	–	–	–
(Sri Lanka) Negombo Youth SC	–	–	–

Second round
(Saudi Arabia) Al-Shabab	0	2	2
(Qatar) Al Sadd	0	3	3
(Jordan) Al Wahdat	2	0	2
(United Arab Emirates) Al Ain	1	2	3
(Uzbekistan) Pakhtakor Tashkent	2	1	3
(Tajikistan) Regar-TadAZ Tursunzoda	1	3	4
(Saudi Arabia) Al-Hilal	5	2	7
(Palestine) Al-Aqsa	0	1	1
(South Korea) Jeonbuk Hyundai Motors	8	4	12
(Maldives) Victory	0	0	0
(Hong Kong) South China	3	0	3
(Japan) Shimizu S-Pulse	2	6	8
(Thailand) Royal Thai Air Force	1	0	1
(Singapore) Home United	0	5	5
(China) Chongqing Longxin	8	1	9
(Vietnam) Công an	1	0	1

Quarter-finals
(Qatar) Al Sadd (a)	1	1	2
(United Arab Emirates) Al Ain	0	2	2
(Tajikistan) Regar-TadAZ Tursunzoda	0	0	0
(Saudi Arabia) Al-Hilal	2	3	5
(South Korea) Jeonbuk Hyundai Motors (a)	1	2	3
(Japan) Shimizu S-Pulse	1	2	3
(Singapore) Home United	0	0	0
(China) Chongqing Longxin	2	2	4

Semi-finals
28 March – Doha
(Qatar) Al Sadd	0
(Saudi Arabia) Al-Hilal	1
28 March – Doha
(South Korea) Jeonbuk Hyundai Motors	2
(China) Chongqing Longxin	0

Final
30 March – Doha
(Saudi Arabia) Al-Hilal (a.s.d.e.t.)	2
(South Korea) Jeonbuk Hyundai Motors	1
Third place
30 March – Doha
(Qatar) Al Sadd (p)	0 (7)
(China) Chongqing Longxin	0 (6)

== First round ==
Team 1	Agg.	Team 2	1st leg	2nd leg
West Asia
Al Sadd (Qatar)	2–2 (5–3 p)	(Iran) Fajr Sepasi	1–1	1–1
Al-Sha'ab Hadramaut (Yemen)	3–7	(Jordan) Al Wahdat	3–2	0–5
Al Ain (United Arab Emirates)	w/o (Note: Al Ain won on walkover as Al Salmiya withdrew.)	(Kuwait) Al Salmiya	Canc.	Canc.
Al Aqsa (Palestine)	4–4 (a)	(Iraq) Al-Quwa Al-Jawiya	1–0	3–4
Tishreen (Syria)	3–4	(Saudi Arabia) Al Hilal	2–3	1–1
Nisa Aşgabat (Turkmenistan)	2–4	(Tajikistan) Regar-TadAZ Tursunzoda	1–0	1–4
SKA-PVO Bishkek (Kyrgyzstan)	3–4	(Uzbekistan) Pakhtakor Tashkent	2–1	1–3
East Asia
South China (Hong Kong)	w/o (Note: South China won on walkover as Negombo Youth withdrew.)	(Sri Lanka) Negombo Youth SC	Canc.	Canc.
Victory (Maldives)	4–2	(Indonesia) PSM Makassar	3–0	1–2
Công an (Vietnam)	bye (Note: Công an were drawn against the representatives of Pakistan, but the Pakistan Football Federation did not enter a team.)	(Pakistan)	Canc.	Canc.

== Second round ==
Team 1	Agg.	Team 2	1st leg	2nd leg
West Asia
Al-Shabab (Saudi Arabia)	2–3	(Qatar) Al-Sadd	0–0	2–3
Al Wahdat (Jordan)	2–3	(United Arab Emirates) Al-Ain	2–1	0–2
Al-Hilal (Saudi Arabia)	7–1	(Palestine) Al Aqsa	5–0	2–1
Pakhtakor Tashkent (Uzbekistan)	3–5	(Tajikistan) Regar-TadAZ Tursunzoda	2–2	1–3
East Asia
South China (Hong Kong)	3–8	(Japan) Shimizu S-Pulse	3–2	0–6
Jeonbuk Hyundai Motors (South Korea)	12–0	(Maldives) Victory	8–0	4–0
Chongqing Longxin (China)	9–1	(Vietnam) Công an	8–1	1–0
Royal Thai Air Force FC (Thailand)	1–5	(Singapore) Home United	1–0	0–5

== Quarter-finals ==
Team 1	Agg.	Team 2	1st leg	2nd leg
West Asia
Al-Sadd (Qatar)	2–2 (a)	(United Arab Emirates) Al-Ain	1–0	1–2
Regar-TadAZ Tursunzoda (Tajikistan)	0–5	(Saudi Arabia) Al-Hilal	0–2	0–3
East Asia
Jeonbuk Hyundai Motors (South Korea)	3–3 (a)	(Japan) Shimizu S-Pulse	1–1	2–2
Home United (Singapore)	0–4	(China) Chongqing Longxin	0–2	0–2

== Semi-finals ==
March 28, 2002

Al Sadd (Qatar)	0–1	(Saudi Arabia) Al-Hilal
		Edmilson Dias 49'

Jassim bin Hamad Stadium, Doha
March 28, 2002

Jeonbuk Hyundai Motors (South Korea)	2–0	(China) Chongqing Longxin
Park Sung Bae 20', 85'

Doha

== Third place match ==
March 30, 2002

Al-Sadd (Qatar)	0–0 (a.e.t.)	(China) Chongqing Longxin
Penalties
	7–6

Doha

== Final ==
March 30, 2002

Al-Hilal (Saudi Arabia)	2–1 (a.e.t.)	(South Korea) Jeonbuk Hyundai Motors
Edmilson Dias 49'; Hussein Al-Ali 98'		Julio Cesar Gouveia 73' (pen.)

Jassim bin Hamad Stadium, Doha
Referee: Saad Kamil Al-Fadhli (Kuwait)

== See also ==
- 2001–02 Asian Club Championship
- 2002 Asian Super Cup
