= Natipong Sritong-In =

Thai footballer

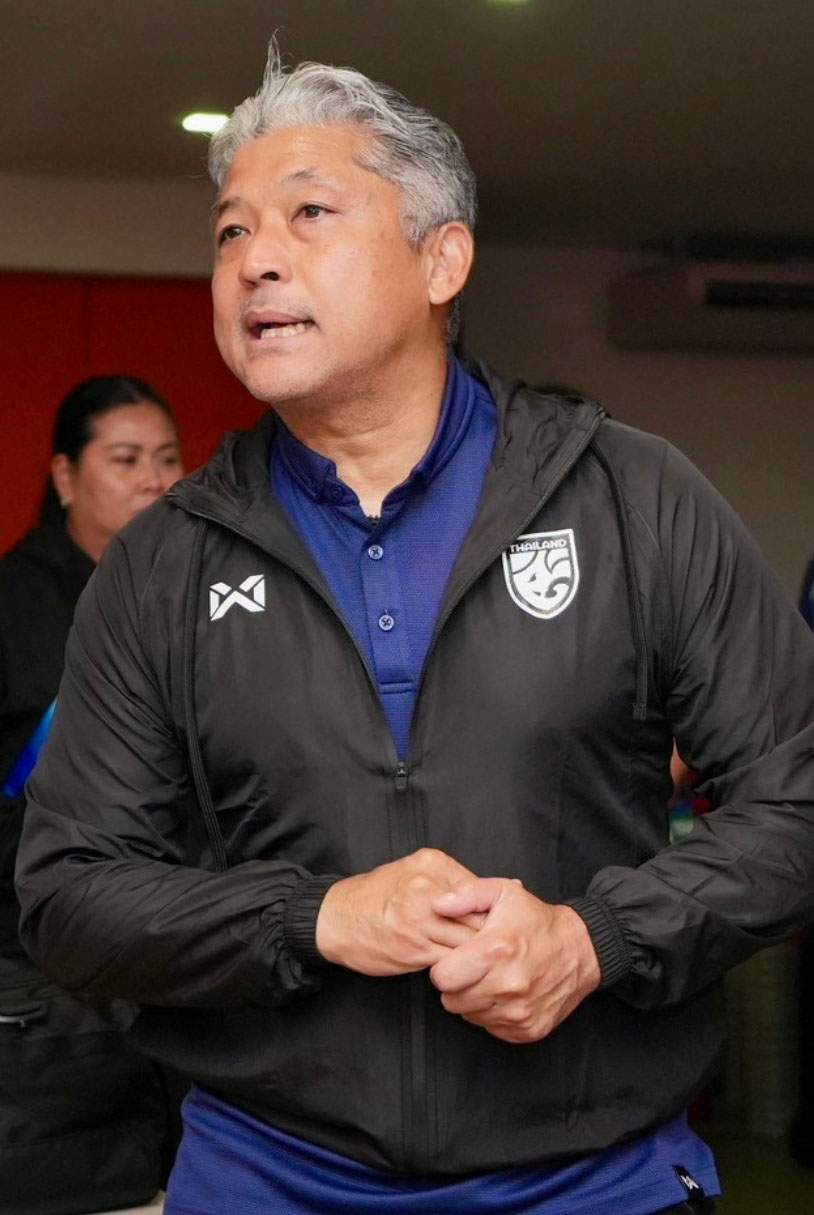
- Natipong in 2026

Personal information
- Full name: Natipong Sritong-In
- Date of birth: 8 September 1972 (age 54)
- Place of birth: Bangkok, Thailand
- Height: 1.72 m (5 ft 8 in)
- Position: Striker

Team information
- Current team: Thailand (head coach)

Youth career
- Stade Français
- 1982–1983: Racing Club de France
- 1989–1990: Olympique Noisy-le-Sec

Senior career*
Years	Team	Apps	(Gls)
1991–1993	Olympique Noisy-le-Sec	21	(3)
1994	Bangkok Bank	?	(?)
1994–1997	Thai Farmer Bank FC	89	(66)
Total		110	(69)

International career
1994–1997	Thailand	55	(25)

Managerial career
- 2017–2018: Kalasin
- 2018: Navy
- 2026–: Thailand women
Medal record
Thailand national football team
Sea Games
Gold medal – first place	Sea Games 1995	Football
Gold medal – first place	Sea Games 1997	Football
- * Club domestic league appearances and goals

Natipong Sritong-In (Thai เนติพงษ์ ศรีทองอินทร์) is a Thai-French football manager and former player who played as a striker. He is the head coach of the Thailand women.

== International goals ==
#	Date	Venue	Opponent	Score	Result	Competition
1.	10 December 1995	Chiang Mai, Thailand	Vietnam	3–1	Won	1995 Southeast Asian Games
2.	10 December 1995	Chiang Mai, Thailand	Vietnam	3–1	Won	1995 Southeast Asian Games
3.	12 December 1995	Chiang Mai, Thailand	Cambodia	9–0	Won	1995 Southeast Asian Games
4.	16 December 1995	Chiang Mai, Thailand	Vietnam	4–0	Won	1995 Southeast Asian Games
5.	16 December 1995	Chiang Mai, Thailand	Vietnam	4–0	Won	1995 Southeast Asian Games
6.	9 February 1996	Bangkok, Thailand	Finland	1–0	Won	King's Cup 1996
7.	16 February 1996	Bangkok, Thailand	Finland	5–2	Won	King's Cup 1996
8.	16 February 1996	Bangkok, Thailand	Finland	5–2	Won	King's Cup 1996
9.	16 February 1996	Bangkok, Thailand	Finland	5–2	Won	King's Cup 1996
10.	27 June 1996	Bangkok, Thailand	Maldives	8–0	Won	1996 Asian Cup qualification
11.	27 June 1996	Bangkok, Thailand	Maldives	8–0	Won	1996 Asian Cup qualification
12.	27 June 1996	Bangkok, Thailand	Maldives	8–0	Won	1996 Asian Cup qualification
13.	7 July 1996	Singapore	Myanmar	7–1	Won	1996 Asian Cup qualification
14.	9 July 1996	Singapore	Singapore	2–2	Drew	1996 Asian Cup qualification
15.	2 September 1996	Singapore	Philippines	5–0	Won	1996 Tiger Cup
16.	2 September 1996	Singapore	Philippines	5–0	Won	1996 Tiger Cup
17.	6 September 1996	Singapore	Brunei	6–0	Won	1996 Tiger Cup
18.	6 September 1996	Singapore	Brunei	6–0	Won	1996 Tiger Cup
19.	8 September 1996	Singapore	Malaysia	1–1	Drew	1996 Tiger Cup
20.	13 September 1996	Singapore	Vietnam	4–2	Won	1996 Tiger Cup
21.	13 September 1996	Singapore	Vietnam	4–2	Won	1996 Tiger Cup
22.	9 February 1997	Bangkok, Thailand	Japan	1–1	Drew	King's Cup 1997
23.	9 March 1997	Bangkok, Thailand	Hong Kong	2–0	Won	1998 FIFA World Cup qualification
24.	30 March 1997	Hong Kong Island, Hong Kong	Hong Kong	2–3	Lost	1998 FIFA World Cup qualification
25.	12 October 1997	Jakarta, Indonesia	Cambodia	4–0	Won	1997 Southeast Asian Games

== Honours ==
=== Clubs ===
Thai Farmer Bank

- Asian Club Championship: 1994, 1995
- Kor Royal Cup: 1995
- Queen's Cup: 1994, 1995
- Afro-Asian Club Championship: 1994

=== International ===
Thailand

- Sea Games: 1995, 1997
- ASEAN Football Championship: 1996
- King's Cup: 1994

=== Individual ===
- ASEAN Football Championship top scorer: 1996
- Asian Super Cup top scorer: 1995
