= 2001 FIFA Club World Championship =

Campeonato Mundial de Clubes de la FIFA España 2001
- 2001 FIFA Club World Championship official logo

Tournament details
- Host country: Spain
- Dates: 28 July – 12 August (cancelled)
- Teams: 12 (from 6 confederations)

The 2001 FIFA Club World Championship was a football tournament arranged by FIFA to take place in Spain from 28 July to 12 August 2001. It was supposed to be the second edition of the FIFA Club World Championship, after the first edition in 2000, but was cancelled owing to a combination of factors such as the collapse of FIFA's marketing partner ISL. FIFA had originally planned to postpone the tournament until 2003.

== Host bids ==
The FIFA Executive Committee appointed Spain as tournament hosts on 3 August 2000 during their meeting in Zürich, Switzerland.

== Qualified teams ==
Location of the teams intending to participate in the 2001 FIFA Club World Championship

The clubs invited to the 2001 tournament were:

Team	Confederation	Qualification	Participation (Note: Participation number if the tournament had been played)
(Spain) Deportivo La Coruña	UEFA (host)	Winners of the 1999–2000 La Liga	1st
(Ghana) Hearts of Oak	CAF	Winners of the 2000 CAF Champions League	1st
(Egypt) Zamalek	CAF	Winners of the 2000 African Cup Winners' Cup	1st
(Saudi Arabia) Al-Hilal	AFC	Winners of the 2000 Asian Super Cup	1st
(Japan) Júbilo Iwata	AFC	Winners of the 1999 Asian Super Cup	1st
(Spain) Real Madrid	UEFA	Winners of the 1999–2000 UEFA Champions League	2nd (Previous: 2000)
(Turkey) Galatasaray	UEFA	Winners of the 1999–2000 UEFA Cup	1st
(United States) Los Angeles Galaxy	CONCACAF	Winners of the 2000 CONCACAF Champions' Cup	1st
(Honduras) Olimpia	CONCACAF	Runners-up of the 2000 CONCACAF Champions' Cup	1st
(Australia) Wollongong Wolves	OFC	Winners of the 2001 Oceania Club Championship	1st
(Argentina) Boca Juniors	CONMEBOL	Winners of the 2000 Copa Libertadores	1st
(Brazil) Palmeiras	CONMEBOL	Winners of the 1999 Copa Libertadores	1st

== Venues ==
Matches were to be played in Madrid, A Coruña and Santiago de Compostela.

Madrid
Estadio Santiago Bernabéu	Estadio Vicente Calderón
Capacity: 85,000	Capacity: 54,907
2001 FIFA Club World Championship is located in Spain
A Coruña	Santiago de Compostela
Estadio Riazor	Estadio Multiusos de San Lazaro
Capacity: 32,660	Capacity: 12,000

== Format ==
Due to the expansion of the tournament to 12 teams, the group stage saw the teams divided into three groups of four. The top team in each group and the best second-placed team qualified for the semi-finals.

== Group stage ==
The group stage draw was held on 6 March 2001 at the Congress Centre in A Coruña; however, on 18 May 2001, FIFA confirmed that the tournament had been cancelled. They made plans to hold an expanded, 16-team tournament in 2003, again in Spain, but it was ultimately not until 2005 in Japan that the tournament was finally resurrected, but with a reduced format.

=== Group A ===
- (Argentina) Boca Juniors
- (Spain) Deportivo La Coruña
- (Australia) Wollongong Wolves
- (Egypt) Zamalek
28 July 2001
20:00

Boca Juniors (Argentina)	Cancelled	(Spain) Deportivo La Coruña

Estadio Riazor, A Coruña
29 July 2001
17:00

Wollongong Wolves (Australia)	Cancelled	(Egypt) Zamalek

Estadio Riazor, A Coruña

1 August 2001
19:30

Deportivo La Coruña (Spain)	Cancelled	(Australia) Wollongong Wolves

Estadio Riazor, A Coruña
1 August 2001
22:00

Zamalek (Egypt)	Cancelled	(Argentina) Boca Juniors

Estadio Riazor, A Coruña

4 August 2001
20:30

Boca Juniors (Argentina)	Cancelled	(Australia) Wollongong Wolves

Estadio Multiusos de San Lázaro, Santiago de Compostela
4 August 2001
20:30

Deportivo La Coruña (Spain)	Cancelled	(Egypt) Zamalek

Estadio Riazor, A Coruña

=== Group B ===
- (Saudi Arabia) Al-Hilal
- (Turkey) Galatasaray
- (Honduras) Olimpia
- (Brazil) Palmeiras
29 July 2001
20:00

Palmeiras (Brazil)	Cancelled	(Honduras) Olimpia

Vicente Calderón Stadium, Madrid
30 July 2001
22:00

Galatasaray (Turkey)	Cancelled	(Saudi Arabia) Al-Hilal

Vicente Calderón Stadium, Madrid

2 August 2001
19:30

Olimpia (Honduras)	Cancelled	(Turkey) Galatasaray

Vicente Calderón Stadium, Madrid
2 August 2001
22:00

Al-Hilal (Saudi Arabia)	Cancelled	(Brazil) Palmeiras

Vicente Calderón Stadium, Madrid

5 August 2001
22:00

Palmeiras (Brazil)	Cancelled	(Turkey) Galatasaray

Vicente Calderón Stadium, Madrid
5 August 2001
22:00

Olimpia (Honduras)	Cancelled	(Saudi Arabia) Al-Hilal

Santiago Bernabéu Stadium, Madrid

=== Group C ===
- (Ghana) Hearts of Oak
- (Japan) Júbilo Iwata
- (United States) Los Angeles Galaxy
- (Spain) Real Madrid
31 July 2001
19:30

Real Madrid (Spain)	Cancelled	(Japan) Júbilo Iwata

Santiago Bernabéu Stadium, Madrid
31 July 2001
22:00

Hearts of Oak (Ghana)	Cancelled	(United States) Los Angeles Galaxy

Santiago Bernabéu Stadium, Madrid

3 August 2001
19:30

Júbilo Iwata (Japan)	Cancelled	(Ghana) Hearts of Oak

Santiago Bernabéu Stadium, Madrid
3 August 2001
22:00

Los Angeles Galaxy (United States)	Cancelled	(Spain) Real Madrid

Santiago Bernabéu Stadium, Madrid

6 August 2001
22:00

Real Madrid (Spain)	Cancelled	(Ghana) Hearts of Oak

Santiago Bernabéu Stadium, Madrid
6 August 2001
22:00

Júbilo Iwata (Japan)	Cancelled	(United States) Los Angeles Galaxy

Vicente Calderón Stadium, Madrid

== Knockout stage ==
=== Semi-finals ===
9 August 2001
19:30

Winner of Group A	Cancelled	Winner of Group B

Estadio Riazor, A Coruña

9 August 2001
22:00

Winner of Group C	Cancelled	Best 2nd place

Santiago Bernabéu Stadium, Madrid

=== Match for third place ===
12 August 2001
19:30

Loser of Match 19	Cancelled	Loser of Match 20

Santiago Bernabéu Stadium, Madrid

=== Final ===
12 August 2001
22:00

Winner of Match 19	Cancelled	Winner of Match 20

Santiago Bernabéu Stadium, Madrid
