= 2002 Asian Super Cup =

- Event: 2002 Asian Super Cup
Suwon Samsung Bluewings	Al Hilal
1	1
- Suwon Samsung Bluewings won 4–2 on Penalties

First leg
Suwon Samsung Bluewings	Al Hilal
1	0
- Date: 6 July 2002
- Venue: Suwon World Cup Stadium, Suwon, South Korea

Second leg
Al Hilal	Suwon Samsung Bluewings
1	0
- Date: 19 July 2002
- Venue: King Fahd International Stadium, Riyadh, Saudi Arabia

The 2002 Asian Super Cup was the 8th Asian Super Cup, a football match played between the winners of the previous season's Asian Club Championship and Asian Cup Winners Cup competitions. The 2002 competition was contested by Suwon Samsung Bluewings of South Korea, who won the Asian Club Championship 2001–02, and Al Hilal of Saudi Arabia, the winners of the Asian Cup Winners Cup 2002.

== Route to the Super Cup ==
=== Suwon Samsung Bluewings ===
Opponents	Round	Score^{1}	Suwon Samsung Bluewings goalscorers
(Sri Lanka) Saunders SC	Second round	21–0 ^{2}	?
(South Korea) Anyang LG Cheetahs	Quarterfinals	0–0	
(Japan) Kashima Antlers	Quarterfinals	2–0	Seo Jung-Won 55', Son Dae-Ho 82'
(China) Dalian Shide	Quarterfinals	2–0	Sandro Cardoso 8' 18'
(Uzbekistan) Nasaf Qarshi	Semifinals	3–0	Alen Avdić 49', Seo Jung-Won 72', Lee Sun-Woo 90'
(South Korea) Anyang LG Cheetahs	Final	0–0 (AET, 4 PK 2)	

^{1}Suwon Samsung Bluewings goals always recorded first.
^{2} Saunders did not show up for the 2nd leg.

=== Al Hilal ===
Opponents	Round	Score^{1}	Al Hilal goalscorers
(Syria) Tishreen	First round	4–3	?
(Palestine) Al Aqsa	Second round	7–1	?
(Tajikistan) Regar-TadAZ Tursunzoda	Quarterfinals	5–0	Abdullah Al-Jumaan 24', 30', Sami Al-Jaber 68', 84', 88'
(Qatar) Al Sadd	Semifinals	1–0	Edmilson Dias 49'
(South Korea) Jeonbuk Hyundai Motors	Final	2–1 (aet)	Edmilson Dias 49', Hussein Al-Ali 98'

^{1}Al Hilal goals always recorded first.

== Game summary ==
Team 1	Agg.	Team 2	1st leg	2nd leg
Suwon Samsung Bluewings (South Korea)	1–1(4- PK 2)	(Saudi Arabia) Al Hilal	1–0	0–1

=== First leg ===
6 July 2002
19:30 GMT+9

Suwon Samsung Bluewings (South Korea)	1–0	(Saudi Arabia) Al Hilal
Lee Ki-Hyung 53'

Suwon World Cup Stadium

=== Second leg ===
19 July 2002
21:00 GMT+3

Al Hilal (Saudi Arabia)	1–0 (a.e.t.)	(South Korea) Suwon Samsung Bluewings
Ricardo Pérez Tamayo 36'
Penalties
	2–4

King Fahd International Stadium, Riyadh
Referee: Tajaddin Fares (Syria)
