= Oybek Usmankhojaev =

Uzbek professional footballer (born 1972)

Personal information
- Date of birth: 13 December 1972 (age 53)
- Place of birth: Uzbek SSR, Soviet Union
- Position: Forward

Senior career*
Years	Team	Apps	(Gls)
1989	Sokhibkor Khalkabad	1	(0)
1990	Shakhter Angren	12	(1)
1991	Pakhtakor Tashkent		
1991–1992	Navbahor Namangan	35	(4)
1993	Nuravshon Bukhoro		
1994	MHSK Tashkent		
1994	Nuravshon Bukhoro		
1995–1997	MHSK Tashkent	84	(59)
1998	Pakhtakor Tashkent	5	(0)
1998	FK Buxoro	18	(10)
1999	Dustlik	??	(22)
2000	FK Dinamo Samarqand	31	(22)
2001	Esil Kokshetau	27	(7)
2002	Nasaf Qarshi	13	(6)
2002	Dustlik	15	(6)
2003	Navbahor Namangan	13	(2)
2003	Dustlik	14	(3)
2004–2008	Lokomotiv Tashkent	60	(11)

International career
1992–2000	Uzbekistan	11	(1)

Managerial career
- 2010: Durmen-Sport
- * Club domestic league appearances and goals

Oybek Usmankhojaev (Uzbek: Oybek Usmonxoʻjayev / Ойбек Усмонхўжаев) (born 11 May December 1978) is an Uzbek former professional footballer.

== Career ==
Usmankhojaev began his career at Sokhibkor Khalkabad. He won Uzbek League champion titles with MHSK Tashkent, Pakhtakor Tashkent and Dustlik. In 1999, he won the Uzbek League championship with Dustlik and became top scorer of the club with 22 goals. In 2000, he moved to FK Dinamo Samarqand. Dinamo Samarqand reached the final of the 2000 Uzbek Cup, but lost 4-1 in the final match to Pakhtakor Tashkent. Usmankhojaev scored the only Dinamo Samarqand goal.

From 2004 to 2008 he played for Lokomotiv Tashkent where he finished his playing career. Usmankhojaev is one of the top scoring players in Uzbek League history with 157 goals in 342 matches. He scored a total of 206 goals in all competitions, entering the Gennadi Krasnitsky club.

== International ==
He played 11 matches and scored 1 goal for national team.

== Managing career ==
After finishing his playing career, he started coaching in 2010 at Durmen Sport in First League as assistant coach. In November 2013 he joined Olmaliq FK coaching stuff as scout coach of the club.

== Honours ==
=== Club ===
Navbahor Namangan

- Uzbek Cup: 1992

MHSK Tashkent

- Uzbek League: 1997
- Uzbek Cup runner-up: 1995

Pakhtakor

- Uzbek League: 1998

Dustlik

- Uzbek League: 1999

Dinamo Samarqand

- Uzbek Cup runner-up: 2000

=== Individual ===
- Gennadi Krasnitsky club: 194 goals
- Club 200 of Berador Abduraimov: 205 goals
