= 1998–99 Asian Cup Winners' Cup =

Tournament details
- Teams: 28

Final positions
- Champions: (Saudi Arabia) Al Ittihad (1st title)
- Runners-up: (South Korea) Chunnam Dragons
- Third place: (Japan) Kashima Antlers
- Fourth place: (Iraq) Al Talaba

The 1998–99 Asian Cup Winners' Cup was the ninth edition of association football competition run by the Asian Football Confederation (AFC) specifically for the winners of domestic cup competitions in AFC members nations.

== First round ==
=== West Asia ===
Team 1	Agg.	Team 2	1st leg	2nd leg
Kazma (Kuwait)	5–2	(United Arab Emirates) Al Wahda	2–0	3–2
Al Ahli (Yemen)	0–3	(Iraq) Al Talaba	0–0	0–3
PAS (Iran)	10–3	(Oman) Al-Seeb	10–1	0–2
Al Ahli (Qatar)	(w/o)^{1}	(Lebanon) Al Nejmeh		
Khujand (Tajikistan)	2–5	(Uzbekistan) Pakhtakor	1–1	1–4
Nisa Aşgabat (Turkmenistan)	2–1	(Kazakhstan) Kaisar Kzyl-Orda	1–0	1–1
Al Ittihad (Saudi Arabia)	bye			
Al Nassr (Saudi Arabia)	bye			

^{1} Al Nejmeh withdrew.

=== East Asia ===
Team 1	Agg.	Team 2	1st leg	2nd leg
Sinthana (Thailand)	5–2	(Singapore) Woodlands Wellington	4–1	1–1
Hải Quan (Vietnam)	2–5	(Malaysia) Sarawak	1–2	1–3
Chunnam Dragons (South Korea)	(w/o)^{1}	(Sri Lanka) Police SC		
Salgaocar (India)	1–4	(China) Beijing Guoan	1–0	0–4
Mahendra Police (Nepal)	0–2	(Maldives) New Radiant	0–0	0–2
Happy Valley (Hong Kong)	(w/o)^{2}	(Pakistan) PIA		
Yangon City Development (Myanmar)	bye^{3}			
Kashima Antlers (Japan)	bye			

^{1} Police SC withdrew.
^{2} PIA FC withdrew.
^{3} Yangon City Development had been drawn against the representatives of Indonesia, where the 1997/98 season was abandoned and the cup cancelled due to political and economic turmoil in the country.

== Second round ==
=== West Asia ===
Team 1	Agg.	Team 2	1st leg	2nd leg
Kazma (Kuwait)	4–2	(Saudi Arabia) Al-Nassr	3–0	1–2
PAS (Iran)	1–2	(Iraq) Al Talaba	0–1	1–1
Al Ahli (Qatar)	1–7	(Saudi Arabia) Al Ittihad	0–0	1–7
Nisa Aşgabat (Turkmenistan)	5–6	(Uzbekistan) Pakhtakor	5–0	0–6

=== East Asia ===
Team 1	Agg.	Team 2	1st leg	2nd leg
Yangon City Development (Myanmar)	0–4	(Malaysia) Sarawak	0–1	0–3^{1}
New Radiant (Maldives)	4–6	(Hong Kong) Happy Valley	3–1	1–5
Sinthana (Thailand)	1–11	(Japan) Kashima Antlers	1–2	0–9
Beijing Guoan (China)	0–4	(South Korea) Chunnam Dragons	0–2	0–2

^{1} Yangon City Development were unable to field a team for the second leg to player illness.

== Quarterfinals ==
=== West Asia ===
Team 1	Agg.	Team 2	1st leg	2nd leg
Kazma (Kuwait)	(w/o)^{1}	(Iraq) Al Talaba		
Al Ittihad (Saudi Arabia)	4–0	(Uzbekistan) Pakhtakor	3–0	1–0

^{1} Kazma withdrew.

=== East Asia ===
Team 1	Agg.	Team 2	1st leg	2nd leg
Happy Valley (Hong Kong)	1–7	(South Korea) Chunnam Dragons	0–3	1–4
Sarawak (Malaysia)	2–14	(Japan) Kashima Antlers	2–4	0–10

== Semifinals ==
April 16, 1999

Al Talaba (Iraq)	1–3	(Saudi Arabia) Al Ittihad
Qahtan Chathir Drain 36'		Mohammed Al Sahafi 20'; Dalian Atkinson 25'; Ahmed Bahja 90'

National Olympic Stadium, Tokyo, Japan
April 16, 1999

Kashima Antlers (Japan)	1–4	(South Korea) Chunnam Dragons
Yutaka Akita 12'		Roh Sang-Rae 33', 86'; Kim Jong-hyun 48'; Lim Kwan-Sik 66'

National Olympic Stadium, Tokyo, Japan

== Third place match ==
April 18, 1999

Kashima Antlers (Japan)	1–0	(Iraq) Al Talaba
Tomoyuki Hirase 42'

National Olympic Stadium, Tokyo, Japan

== Final ==
April 18, 1999

Al Ittihad (Saudi Arabia)	3–2 (a.e.t.)	(South Korea) Chunnam Dragons
Ahmed Bahja 10' (pen.) 105'; Mohammed Noor 84'		Roh Sang-Rae 14', 70'

National Olympic Stadium, Tokyo, Japan
Referee: Ali Bujsaim ( United Arab Emirates)
