= Hyupsung High School =

School in Daegu, South Korea

Hyupsung High School 협성고등학교

Location
- Nam-gu, Daegu; South Korea; 35.83478°N 128.59853°E

Information
- Type: Private
- Motto: Carve your own way
- Established: 1955
- Principal: Lee Jong Hyun
- Enrollment: 878
- Website: hyupsung.dge.hs.kr/hyupsungh/main.do?sysId=hyupsungh

- Hyupsung High School
- Hangul: 협성고등학교
- Hanja: 協成高等學校
- RR: Hyeopseong godeunghakgyo
- MR: Hyŏpsŏng kodŭnghakkyo

Hyupsung High School is a high school in Nam District, Daegu, South Korea.

== Clubs ==
Hyupsung high school includes these clubs below:

- AriRangTeukgondae(아리랑 특공대) (Alternative Artists Group, since 1999)
- A.I (Magic Club)
- Sensation (English Speech Club)
- Arirang 21(아리랑 21) (International Exchange Club)
- BM Crew (Beat Box Club)
- REPLAY (School band)
- E.O.S (Soccer Club)
- 2M (Health Club)
- Daeduk(대덕) (Literature Club)
- Evangel (Christianity Music Club)
- Bedelcell(벧엘셀) (Catholic Club)
- GIGA (Computer Club)
- C.O.C (Astronomy Club)
- Mac(맥) (Book Club)
- UNESCO (Volunteer Club)
- CnP (Animation Club)
- HSBS (Broadcast Club)
- HAPO (Photograph Club)
- TRPG (Board Game Club)
- KINO (Movie Club)
- Antioch(안디옥) (Christianity Club)
- NEWTON (Science Club)
- EOD (Dance Club)

== Symbols ==
- School Motto: Carve your own way
- School Flower: Korean Forsythia
- School Tree: Himalayan cedar
