= Elena Berkova =

Russian model, television presenter, singer and actress (born 1985)

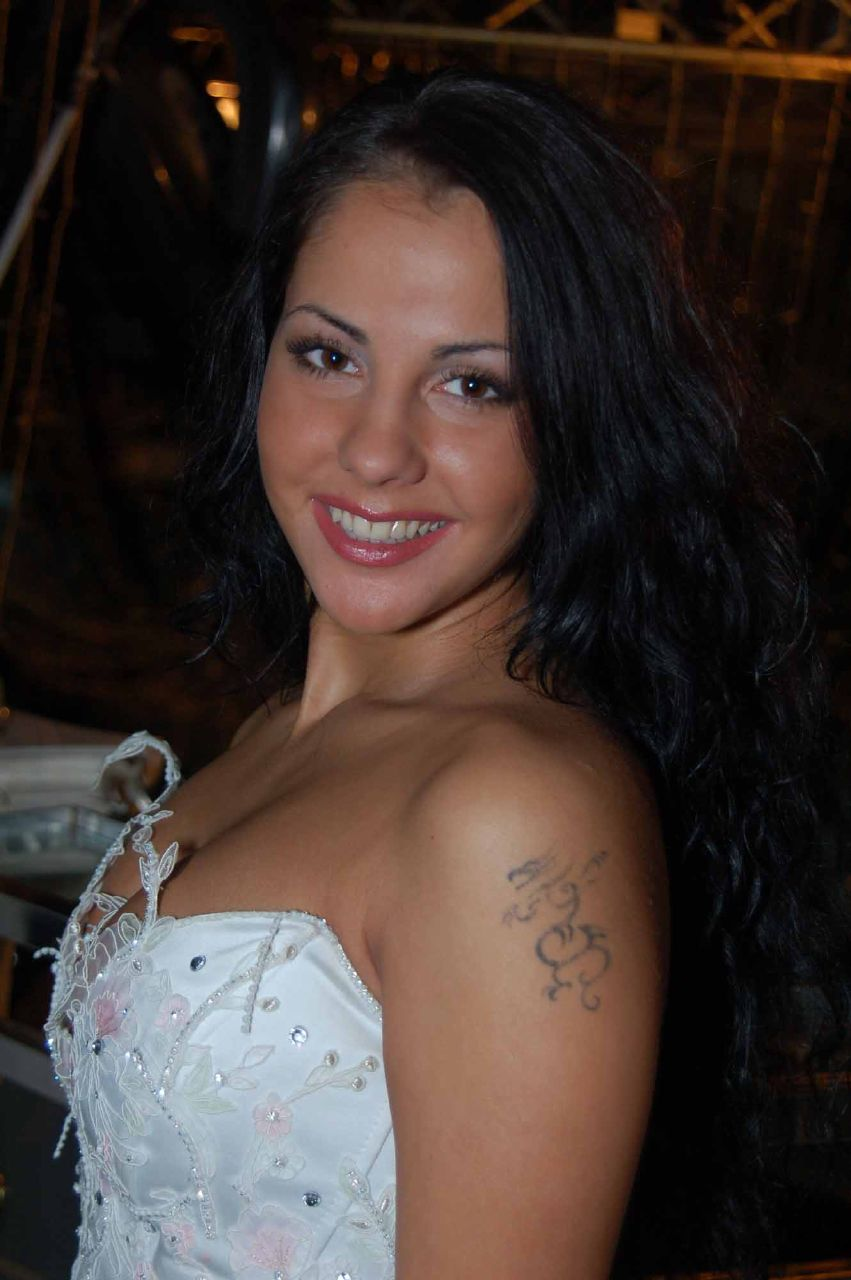
- Berkova in 2006
- Born: Elena Sergeyevna Berkova; 11 March 1985 (age 41); Murmansk, Russian SFSR, Soviet Union
- Other names: Velvet Angel, Penelope, Jewel
- Citizenship: Russian
- Occupations: Model, television presenter, singer, actress
- Height: 1.58 m (5 ft 2 in)
- Spouse: Ivan Belkov (divorced)
- Children: 1

Elena Sergeyevna Berkova (Russian: Елена Серге́евна Беркова, Ukrainian: Оле́на Сергі́ївна Бе́ркова; born 11 March 1985) is a Ukrainian-Russian former glamour model and pornographic actress, television presenter, singer and actress.

== Biography ==
Olena Berkova was born on 11 March 1985, in Murmansk, Russia. As a child, she moved with her family to Mykolaiv, Ukraine.

In 2004, Berkova came to her sister in Saint Petersburg from Mykolaiv. She worked in a webcam studio. For 56 days she was a participant in the reality show "Dom-2" (arrived on May 12, 2004, left on July 7).

In 2004, Elena joined the popular show Dom-2 on TV channel TNT. In 2006, Elena appeared as a singer in with the pop music girl group Min net!.

At age 24, Berkova gave birth to a son. The child's father is her third ex-husband, Ivan Belkov.

In March 2009, Berkova, announced her intention to participate in the elections of the mayor of Sochi. Her campaign-video appeared on the Internet. Later Berkova refused to participate in the elections.

On 2 November 2017, Berkova announced her candidacy for the 2018 Russian presidential election and recorded a video with the election program.

== Filmography ==
1. 2005 – Bandit Petersburg 7: Redistribution (TV series)
2. 2015 – Sex Competition 2
3. 2018 – All or Nothing

– Source:
