= Lee Gi-bum =

South Korean footballer

Personal information
- Date of birth: 8 August 1970 (age 56)
- Height: 1.72 m (5 ft 8 in)
- Position: Midfielder

Youth career
- 1983–1985: Hyupsung Middle School
- 1986–1988: Hyupsung High School
- 1989–1992: Kyungil University

Senior career*
Years	Team	Apps	(Gls)
1993–1998	Cheonan Ilhwa Chunma	91	(10)
1999	Ulsan Hyundai	19	(1)
2000	Suwon Samsung Bluewings	6	(0)
Total		116	(11)

International career
1991	South Korea U23	4	(3)
1993	South Korea	11	(3)

Managerial career
- 2005–2012: Hyupsung Middle School
- 2007: Daegu KAPEC
- 2013: Tongyeong Middle School
- 2014: Tongyeong High School
- 2015: Hyupsung High School
- 2016–2017: Shingal High School
- * Club domestic league appearances and goals

- Lee Gi-bum
- Hangul: 이기범
- RR: I Gibeom
- MR: I Kibŏm

Lee Gi-bum (Korean: 이기범; born 8 August 1970) is a South Korean former footballer.

== Club career ==
Having studied at both the Hyupsung Middle School and Hyupsung High School, Lee attended the Kyungil University between 1989 and 1992. He would go on to forge a career in the top flight of South Korean football, named the K League at the time.

== International career ==
Lee played eleven times for South Korea in 1993, scoring a hat-trick against India in qualification for the 1994 FIFA World Cup.

== Coaching career ==
After retiring from his playing career, Lee went on to manage at a number of middle and high schools, including the two he attended. He also managed at now-defunct club Daegu KAPEC, and has worked as a coach at Daejeon Hana Citizen.

== Personal life ==
Lee is the father of Lee Ahn, a South Korean international futsal player, as well as Lee Ji-ho and Lee Hae-ung, who both played professionally in South Korea.

== Career statistics ==
=== Club ===
Club	Season	League			National Cup		League Cup		Total	
Club	Season	Division	Apps	Goals	Apps	Goals	Apps	Goals	Apps	Goals
Cheonan Ilhwa Chunma	1993	K League	9	1	–		1 (Note: Appearances in the Adidas Cup)	0	10	1
Cheonan Ilhwa Chunma	1994	K League	19	2	–		2	0	21	2
Cheonan Ilhwa Chunma	1995	K League	7	1	–		0	0	7	1
Cheonan Ilhwa Chunma	1996	K League	27	5	0	0	7	0	34	5
Cheonan Ilhwa Chunma	1997	K League	15	1	0	0	5 (Note: Appearances in the Pro-Specs Cup)	0	20	1
Cheonan Ilhwa Chunma	1998	K League	14	0	0	0	12 (Note: Eight appearances in the Adidas Cup, four appearances in the Philip Morris Cup)	0	26	0
Cheonan Ilhwa Chunma	Total		91	10	0	0	27	0	118	10
Ulsan Hyundai	1999	K League	19	1	0	0	8 (Note: Appearances in the Daehan Fire Insurance Cup)	0	27	1
Suwon Samsung Bluewings	2000	K League	6	0	0	0	8	0	14	0
Career total			116	11	0	0	43	0	159	11

=== International ===
Appearances and goals by national team and year
National team	Year	Apps	Goals
South Korea	1993	11	3
Total		11	3

=== International goals ===
Scores and results list South Korea's goal tally first, score column indicates score after each Lee goal.

List of international goals scored by Lee Ki-bum
No.	Date	Venue	Opponent	Score	Result	Competition
1	9 June 1993	Seoul, South Korea	India	1–0	7–0	1994 FIFA World Cup qualification
2	9 June 1993	Seoul, South Korea	India	2–0	7–0	1994 FIFA World Cup qualification
3	9 June 1993	Seoul, South Korea	India	5–0	7–0	1994 FIFA World Cup qualification
