= 1995 Asian Super Cup =

- Event: 1995 Asian Super Cup
Thai Farmers Bank	Yokohama Flügels
(Thailand)	(Japan)
3	4

First leg
Thai Farmers Bank	Yokohama Flügels
1	1
- Date: 29 July 1995
- Venue: Suphan Buri Provincial Stadium, Suphan Buri, Thailand

Second leg
Yokohama Flügels	Thai Farmers Bank
3	2
- Date: 2 August 1995
- Venue: Mitsuzawa Stadium, Yokohama, Japan

The 1995 Asian Super Cup was the inaugural edition of the Asian Super Cup, played between 1994–95 Asian Club Championship winners Thai Farmers Bank and 1994–95 Asian Cup Winners' Cup winners Yokohama Flügels. Yokohama Flügels won 4–3 on aggregate.

== Teams ==
Team	Qualification	Previous participation (bold indicates winners)
(Thailand) Thai Farmers Bank	1994–95 Asian Club Championship	None
(Japan) Yokohama Flügels	1994–95 Asian Cup Winners' Cup	None

== Match details ==
=== First leg ===
29 July 1995

Thai Farmers Bank (Thailand)	1–1	(Japan) Yokohama Flügels
Natipong Sritong-In 88'		Zinho 76'

Suphan Buri, Thailand

=== Second leg ===
2 August 1995

Yokohama Flügels (Japan)	3–2	(Thailand) Thai Farmers Bank
Evair 60'; Motohiro Yamaguchi 81'; Takayuki Yoshida 88'		Phanuwat Yinphan 35'; Natipong Sritong-In 70'

Mitsuzawa Stadium
Yokohama, Japan
