= 1997 Asian Super Cup =

- Event: 1996 Asian Super Cup
Pohang Steelers	Al Hilal
1	2

First leg
Pohang Steelers	Al Hilal
0	1
- Date: 12 June 1997

Second leg
Al Hilal	Pohang Steelers
1	1
- Date: 19 June 1997
- Venue: Steelyard Stadium, Pohang, South Korea

The 1997 Asian Super Cup was the 3rd Asian Super Cup, a football match played between the winners of the previous season's Asian Club Championship and Asian Cup Winners Cup competitions. The 1997 competition was contested by Pohang Steelers of South Korea, who won the 1996–97 Asian Club Championship, and Al Hilal of Saudi Arabia, the winners of the 1996–97 Asian Cup Winners' Cup.

== Route to the Super Cup ==
=== Pohang Steelers ===
Opponents	Round	Score^{1}	Pohang Steelers goalscorers
(Indonesia) PSM Makassar	First round	4–1	?
(Thailand) Thai Farmers Bank	Second round	5–1	?
(Japan) Yokohama Marinos	Quarterfinals	2–2	Lee Young-Sang 48', Rade Bogdanovic 75'
(Maldives) New Radiant	Quarterfinals	6–0	Cho Jin-Ho 32' 49'(p) 83' 89', Serhiy Konovalov 34' 61'
(South Korea) Cheonan Ilhwa Chunma	Quarterfinals	0–0	
(Iran) Persepolis	Semifinals	3–1	?
(South Korea) Cheonan Ilhwa Chunma	Final	2–1 (AET)	Park Tae-Ha 78', Park Ji-Ho 117'(p)

^{1}Pohang Steelers goals always recorded first.

=== Al Hilal ===
Opponents	Round	Score^{1}	Al Hilal goalscorers
(Bahrain) Al Qadisiyah	First round	(w/o)^{2}	?
(Kuwait) Al Arabi	Second round	7–0	?
(Oman) Al Nasr	Quarterfinals	5–0 (w/o)^{3}	?
(Iran) Esteghlal	Semifinals	0–0 (AET, 5 PK 4)	
(Japan) Nagoya Grampus Eight	Final	3–0	Al Jaber 16', Al Thunayan 75', Bassir 82'

^{1} Al Hilal goals always recorded first.
^{2} Al Qadisiyah withdrew
^{3} Al Nasr withdrew after 1st leg

== Game summary ==
Team 1	Agg.	Team 2	1st leg	2nd leg
Al Hilal (Saudi Arabia)	2–1	(South Korea) Pohang Steelers	1–0	1–1

=== First leg ===
12 June 1997

Al Hilal (Saudi Arabia)	1–0	(South Korea) Pohang Steelers
Al-Jaber 32'

King Fahd International Stadium, Riyadh
Referee: Ali Bujsaim (United Arab Emirates)

=== Second leg ===
19 June 1997

Pohang Steelers (South Korea)	1–1	(Saudi Arabia) Al Hilal
Seo Hyo-won 13'		52' Al-Jaber

Steelyard Stadium, Pohang
Referee: Lu Jun (China)
