= 1998 Asian Super Cup =

- Event: 1998 Asian Super Cup
Pohang Steelers	Al-Nassr
1	1

First leg
Pohang Steelers	Al-Nassr
1	1
- Date: 1 December 1998
- Venue: Pohang Steel Yard, Pohang, South Korea

Second leg
Al-Nassr	Pohang Steelers
0	0
- Date: 5 December 1998
- Venue: King Fahd International Stadium, Riyadh, Saudi Arabia

The 1998 Asian Super Cup was the 4th Asian Super Cup, a football match played between the winners of the previous season's Asian Club Championship and Asian Cup Winners Cup competitions. The 1998 competition was contested by Pohang Steelers of South Korea, who won the 1997–98 Asian Club Championship, and Al-Nassr of Saudi Arabia, the winners of the 1997–98 Asian Cup Winners' Cup.

== Route to the Super Cup ==
=== Pohang Steelers ===
Opponents	Round	Score^{1}	Pohang Steelers goalscorers
(Bangladesh) Mohammedan	First round	13–0	N/A
(Maldives) Victory	Second round	15–0	N/A
(Japan) Kashima Antlers	Quarterfinals	2–1	Park Tae-Ha 36', Lee Dong-Guk 56'
(China) Dalian Wanda	Quarterfinals	1–2	Serhiy Konovalov 66'
(Myanmar) Finance and Revenue	Quarterfinals	5–1	Baek Seung-Chul 15', Lee Dong-Guk 56', Serhiy Konovalov 60', Park Tae-Ha 81' 88'
(Saudi Arabia) Al-Hilal	Semifinals	1–0	Park Tae-Ha 45'
(China) Dalian Wanda	Final	0–0 AET 6–5 pen	

^{1}Pohang Steelers goals always recorded first.

=== Al-Nassr ===
Opponents	Round	Score^{1}	Al-Nassr goalscorers
(United Arab Emirates) Al-Shabab Al-Arabi	Second round	(w/o)^{2}	
(Qatar) Al-Ittihad	Quarterfinals	3–2	Mamadou Sow, Hussein Hadi, Mohaisen Al-Jam'an,
(Turkmenistan) Köpetdag Aşgabat	Semifinals	2–1	Mohaisen Al-Jam'an 11', Majed Abdullah 39'
(South Korea) Suwon Samsung Bluewings	Final	1–0	Hristo Stoichkov 9'

^{1} Al-Nassr goals always recorded first.
^{2} Al-Shabab Al-Arabi withdrew.

== Game summary ==
Team 1	Agg.	Team 2	1st leg	2nd leg
Pohang Steelers (South Korea)	1–1 (a)	(Saudi Arabia) Al-Nassr	1–1	0–0

=== First leg ===
5 December 1998

(South Korea) Pohang Steelers	1–1	(Saudi Arabia) Al-Nassr
Jeon Kyeong-Joon 45'		Fahad Al-Bishi 35'

Pohang Steel Yard, Pohang
Referee: Mohd Nazri Abdullah (Malaysia)

=== Second leg ===
11 December 1998
19:40 UTC+3

Al-Nassr (Saudi Arabia)	0–0	(South Korea) Pohang Steelers

King Fahd International Stadium, Riyadh
Referee: Ali Bujsaim (United Arab Emirates )

Asian Super Cup
1998 winners

1st title
