= 2000–01 Asian Club Championship =

20th edition of premier club football tournament organized by the AFC

2000–2001 Asian Club Championship
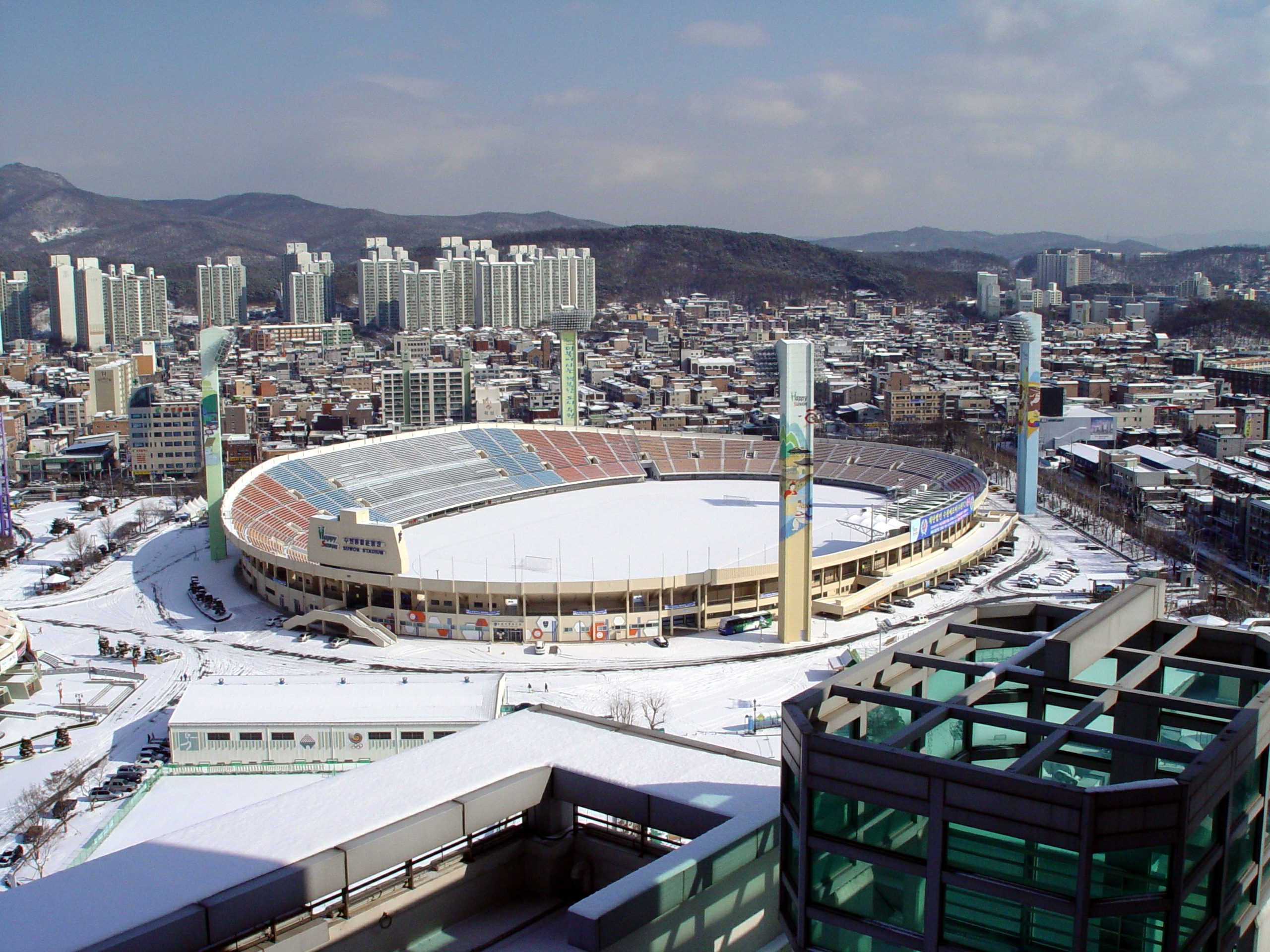
- Suwon Sports Complex in Suwon, South Korea hosted the final

Tournament details
- Dates: August 2000 – May 2001
- Teams: 24

Final positions
- Champions: (South Korea) Suwon Samsung Bluewings (1st title)
- Runners-up: (Japan) Júbilo Iwata
- Third place: (Iran) Persepolis
- Fourth place: (Kazakhstan) FC Irtysh

Tournament statistics
- Matches played: 48
- Goals scored: 160 (3.33 per match)
- Best player: Zoltan Sabo

The 2000–01 Asian Club Championship was the 20th edition of the annual international club football competition held in the AFC region. It determined that year's continental club champion of association football in Asia. It was also the last edition to feature teams from Kazakhstan, as the Kazakhstan Football Federation were in the process of gaining UEFA membership.

Suwon Samsung Bluewings defeated Júbilo Iwata 1–0 the final, which was held at the Suwon Sports Complex in Suwon. As winners, Suwon Samsung Bluewings earned the right to play against 2000–01 Asian Cup Winners' Cup winners Al Shabab in the 2001 Asian Super Cup.

Al Hilal were the defending champions, but were knocked out in the quarter-finals.

== Teams ==
Location of the 2000–01 AFC Champions League teams

Entry Round	Teams			
Second round	West Asia		East Asia	
Second round			(China) Shandong Luneng Taishan	(Hong Kong) South China
Second round			(Japan) Júbilo Iwata	(Maldives) Hurriyya
Second round			(South Korea) Suwon Samsung Bluewings	(Thailand) Royal Thai Air Force
First round	(Bahrain) Al-Ahli	(Iran) Persepolis	(Macau) Polícia de Segurança Pública	(Indonesia) PSM Makassar
First round	(Iraq) Al-Zawraa	(Jordan) Al Ramtha	(Singapore) Home United	(Vietnam) Sông Lam Nghệ An
First round	(Kazakhstan) FC Irtysh	(Kuwait) Al-Salmiya		
First round	(Lebanon) Al-Ansar	(Qatar) Al-Wakrah SC		
First round	(Saudi Arabia) Al Hilal^{TH}	(Saudi Arabia) Al-Ittihad		
First round	(Syria) Al-Karamah	(Tajikistan) Varzob Dushanbe		
First round	(Turkmenistan) Nisa Aşgabat	(United Arab Emirates) Al-Ain		
First round	(Uzbekistan) FC Dustlik	(Yemen) Al-Ahli		

== First round ==
Team 1	Agg.	Team 2	1st leg	2nd leg
West Asia
Al-Hilal (Saudi Arabia)	2–1	(Syria) Al-Karamah	2–1	0–0
Al Ramtha (Jordan)	2–3	(Kuwait) Al-Salmiya	0–1	2–2
Al-Ahli (Yemen)	0–1	(Bahrain) Al-Ahli	0–1	0–0
Al-Ansar (Lebanon)	w/o (Note: Al-Ansar withdrew.)	(Saudi Arabia) Al-Ittihad Jeddah	—	—
Al-Zawraa (Iraq)	2–5	(United Arab Emirates) Al-Ain	2–1	0–4
Al-Wakrah SC (Qatar)	3–9	(Iran) Persepolis	2–4	1–5
FC Irtysh (Kazakhstan)	5–2	(Turkmenistan) Nisa Aşgabat	3–1	2–1
Varzob Dushanbe (Tajikistan)	w/o (Note: FC Dustlik did not show up for the first leg in Dushanbe due to the civil war in Tajikistan; they were ejected from the competition and fined $10,000.)	(Uzbekistan) FC Dustlik	—	—
East Asia
Polícia de Segurança Pública (Macau)	0–11	(Singapore) Home United	0–5	0–6
PSM Makassar (Indonesia)	4–1	(Vietnam) Sông Lam Nghệ An	0–0	4–1

== Second round ==
Team 1	Agg.	Team 2	1st leg	2nd leg
West Asia
Al-Hilal (Saudi Arabia)	3–1	(Kuwait) Al-Salmiya	3–1	0–0
Al-Ittihad Jeddah (Saudi Arabia)	8–2	(Bahrain) Al-Ahli	2–0	6–2
Persepolis (Iran)	4–2	(United Arab Emirates) Al-Ain	2–0	2–2 (a.e.t.)
FC Irtysh (Kazakhstan)	7–3	(Tajikistan) Varzob Dushanbe	4–1	3–2
East Asia
PSM Makassar (Indonesia)	11–1	(Thailand) Royal Thai Air Force	6–1	5–0
South China (Hong Kong)	2–6	(Japan) Júbilo Iwata	1–3	1–3
Shandong Luneng Taishan (China)	6–1	(Singapore) Home United	3–0	3–1
Suwon Samsung Bluewings (South Korea)	2–1	(Maldives) Hurriyya	2–1	0–0

== Quarter-finals ==
=== West Asia ===
Pos	Team	Pld	W	D	L	GF	GA	GD	Pts	Qualification
1	(Iran) Persepolis (H)	3	1	2	0	3	1	+2	5	Advance to knockout stage
2	(Kazakhstan) FC Irtysh	3	1	2	0	2	1	+1	5	Advance to knockout stage
3	(Saudi Arabia) Al-Ittihad Jeddah	3	1	1	1	3	2	+1	4	
4	(Saudi Arabia) Al-Hilal	3	0	1	2	1	5	−4	1	

(H) Hosts
7 March 2001

Al-Hilal (Saudi Arabia)	0–0	(Kazakhstan) FC Irtysh

Tehran, Iran
7 March 2001

Persepolis (Iran)	0–0	(Saudi Arabia) Al-Ittihad Jeddah

Tehran, Iran

9 March 2001

Persepolis (Iran)	0–0	(Kazakhstan) FC Irtysh

Tehran, Iran
9 March 2001

Al-Ittihad Jeddah (Saudi Arabia)	2–0	(Saudi Arabia) Al-Hilal
Al-Yami 23'; Ricardo 85'

Tehran, Iran

11 March 2001

Al-Ittihad Jeddah (Saudi Arabia)	1–2	(Kazakhstan) FC Irtysh
Hwasawi 41'		Mendes 14' 25'

Tehran, Iran
11 March 2001

Persepolis (Iran)	3–1	(Saudi Arabia) Al-Hilal
Karimi 45'; Ansarian 65' (pen.); Kavianpour 69'		Al-Thunayan 9'

Tehran, Iran

=== East Asia ===
Pos	Team	Pld	W	D	L	GF	GA	GD	Pts	Qualification
1	(Japan) Júbilo Iwata	3	3	0	0	12	2	+10	9	Advance to knockout stage
2	(South Korea) Suwon Samsung Bluewings	3	2	0	1	14	4	+10	6	Advance to knockout stage
3	(China) Shandong Luneng Taishan	3	1	0	2	5	13	−8	3	
4	(Indonesia) PSM Makassar (H)	3	0	0	3	2	14	−12	0	

(H) Hosts
21 March 2001

Suwon Samsung Bluewings (South Korea)	0–3	(Japan) Júbilo Iwata
		Fujita 14'; Yang Jong-Hu 77' (o.g.); Nakayama 90'

Makassar, Indonesia
21 March 2001

PSM Makassar (Indonesia)	1–3	(China) Shandong Luneng Taishan
Siswoyo 90'		Nagorniak 15' (pen.); Li Xiaopeng 52'; Li Ming 56'

Makassar, Indonesia

23 March 2001

PSM Makassar (Indonesia)	1–8	(South Korea) Suwon Samsung Bluewings
Kurniawan Dwi Yulianto 35'		Seo Jung-Won 6', 23', 25'; Cardoso 11', 18'; Park Kun-Ha 37'; Ko Jong-Soo 45' (pen.), 79'

Makassar, Indonesia
23 March 2001

Júbilo Iwata (Japan)	6–2	(China) Shandong Luneng Taishan
Fujita 29' (pen.); Nakayama 42', 43', 56'; Živković 66' (pen.); Oku 78'		Casiano 34'; Li Xiaopeng 90'

Makassar, Indonesia

25 March 2001

Shandong Luneng Taishan (China)	0–6	(South Korea) Suwon Samsung Bluewings
		Ko Jong-Soo 8', 38'; Laktionov 28'; Seo Dong-Won 48', 59'; Zoltan 82'

Makassar, Indonesia
25 March 2001

PSM Makassar (Indonesia)	0–3	(Japan) Júbilo Iwata
		Naruo 37'; Seino 56'; Yamanishi 74'

Makassar, Indonesia

== Knockout stage ==
=== Bracket ===
Semi-finals
24 May – Suwon
(Japan) Júbilo Iwata (a.e.t.)	1
(Kazakhstan) FC Irtysh	0
24 May – Suwon
(Iran) Persepolis	1
(South Korea) Suwon Samsung Bluewings	2

Final
26 May – Suwon
(Japan) Júbilo Iwata	0
(South Korea) Suwon Samsung Bluewings	1
Third place play-off
26 May – Suwon
(Iran) Persepolis	2
(Kazakhstan) FC Irtysh	0

=== Semi-finals ===
24 May 2001

Júbilo Iwata (Japan)	1–0 (a.e.t.)	(Kazakhstan) FC Irtysh
Kanazawa 103'

Suwon Sports Complex, Suwon, South Korea

24 May 2001

Persepolis (Iran)	1–2	(South Korea) Suwon Samsung Bluewings
Kavianpour 12'		Seo Jung-Won 78'; Park Kun-Ha 90'

Suwon Sports Complex, Suwon, South Korea

=== Third place match ===
26 May 2001

Persepolis (Iran)	2–0	(Kazakhstan) FC Irtysh
Halali 17'; Estili 34'

Suwon Sports Complex, Suwon, South Korea

=== Final ===
26 May 2001

Júbilo Iwata (Japan)	0–1	(South Korea) Suwon Samsung Bluewings
		Sandro Cardoso 15'

Suwon Sports Complex, Suwon, South Korea

== See also ==
- 2000–01 Asian Cup Winners' Cup
- 2001 Asian Super Cup
