= 1999–2000 Asian Club Championship =

19th edition of premier club football tournament organized by the AFC

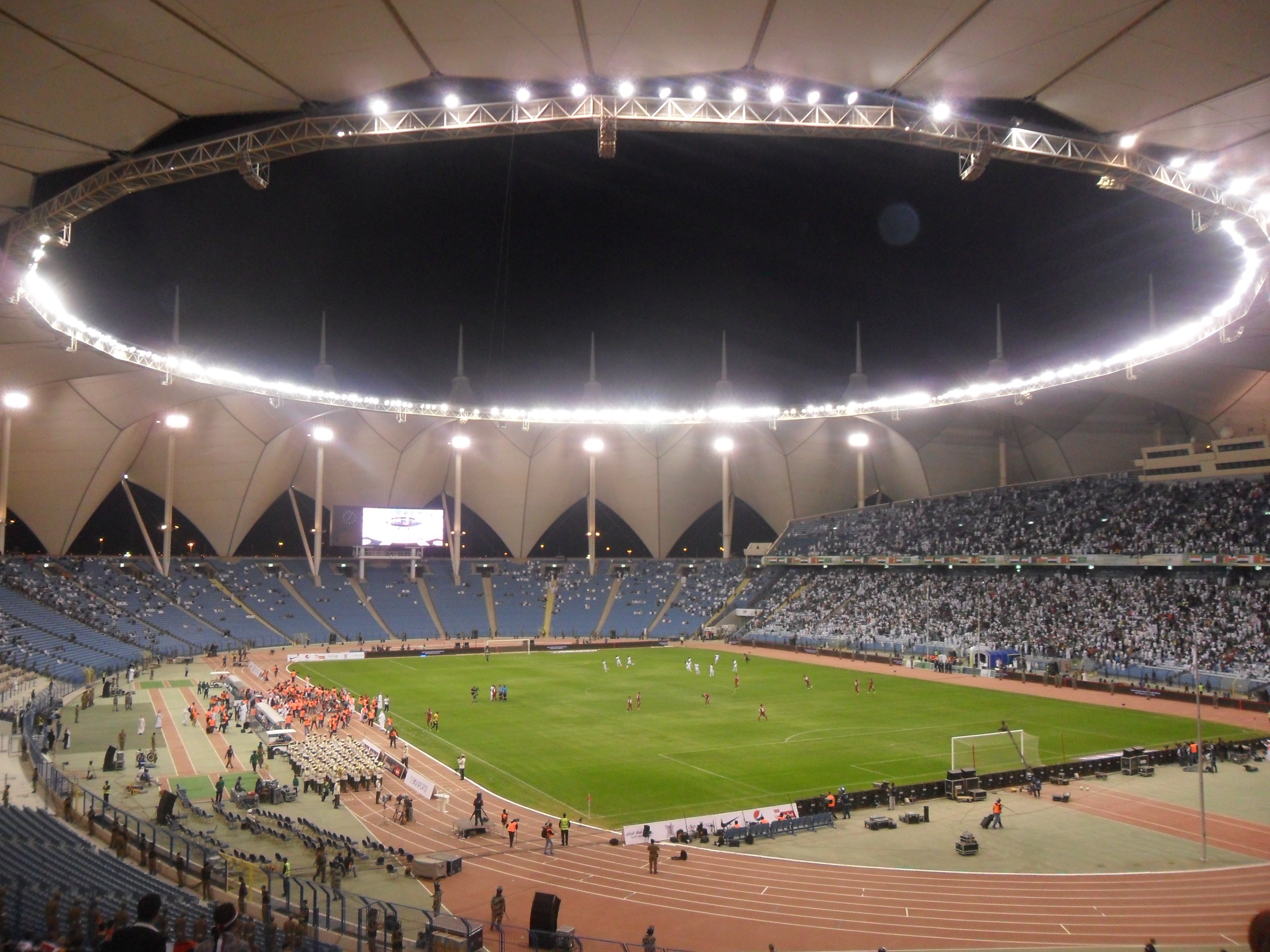
- King Fahd International Stadium in Riyadh hosted the final

Tournament details
- Dates: 15 August 1999 – 22 April 2000
- Teams: 28

Final positions
- Champions: (Saudi Arabia) Al-Hilal (2nd title)
- Runners-up: (Japan) Júbilo Iwata
- Third place: (Iran) Persepolis
- Fourth place: (South Korea) Suwon Samsung Bluewings

Tournament statistics
- Matches played: 44
- Goals scored: 151 (3.43 per match)
- Best player: Sérgio Ricardo

The 1999–2000 Asian Club Championship was the 19th edition of the annual international club football competition held in the AFC region (Asia). It determined that year's club champion of association football in Asia.

Al-Hilal defeated defending champions Júbilo Iwata 3–2 in the final, which was held at the King Fahd International Stadium in Riyadh, Saudi Arabia to win their second continental title. They became the first team from West Asia to win the tournament since PAS Tehran's victory in 1993. As winners, Al-Hilal earned the right to play against the 1999–2000 Asian Cup Winners' Cup winners Shimizu S-Pulse in the 2000 Asian Super Cup, and automatically qualified for the 2000–01 Asian Club Championship.

== First round ==
=== West Asia ===
Team 1	Agg.	Team 2	1st leg	2nd leg
West Asia
Al-Wahda (United Arab Emirates)	3–3 (a)	(Qatar) Al-Sadd	2–2	1–1
FC Irtysh (Kazakhstan)	9–5	(Uzbekistan) FC Pakhtakor Tashkent	7–0	2–5
Varzob Dushanbe (Tajikistan)	5–1	(Kyrgyzstan) Dinamo Bishkek	4–0	1–1
Al-Qadisiya (Kuwait)	w/o (Note: Al-Qadisiya withdrew.)	(Yemen) Al-Wahda	—	—
East Asia
Mohun Bagan (India)	2–1	(Bangladesh) Muktijoddha Sangsad	2–1	0–0
Singapore Armed Forces	11–3	(Cambodia) Royal Dolphins	8–1	3–2
GD Lam Pak (Macau)	1–9	(Thailand) Sinthana	0–2	1–7
PSIS Semarang (Indonesia)	4–9	(South Korea) Suwon Samsung Bluewings	2–3	2–6
Dalian Wanda (China)	w/o (Note: Dalian Wanda withdrew.)	(Japan) Kashima Antlers	—	—
Happy Valley (Hong Kong)	w/o (Note: Happy Valley withdrew.)	(Vietnam) Thể Công	—	—
Valencia (Maldives)	Bye (Note: The Nepalese FA did not enter a team.)	(Nepal) N/A	—	—
Júbilo Iwata (Japan)	Bye	N/A	—	—

== Second round ==
Team 1	Agg.	Team 2	1st leg	2nd leg
West Asia
Persepolis (Iran)	3–0	(Lebanon) Al-Ansar	3–0	0–0
Al-Shorta (Iraq)	5–0	(Yemen) Al-Wahda	5–0	0–0
Al-Sadd (Qatar)	1–3	(Saudi Arabia) Al-Hilal	0–1	1–2
FC Irtysh (Kazakhstan)	5–0	(Tajikistan) Varzob Dushanbe	4–0	1–0
East Asia
Júbilo Iwata (Japan)	8–0	(India) Mohun Bagan	8–0	Canc. (Note: The second leg was cancelled as Mohun Bagan refused to host Jubilo Iwata; they were fined $3000 and banned from AFC competitions for one year.)
Valencia (Maldives)	0–16	(Japan) Kashima Antlers	Canc. (Note: The first leg was cancelled due to the poor pitch conditions.)	0–16
Singapore Armed Forces	2–3	(Thailand) Sinthana	1–1	1–2
Thể Công (Vietnam)	1–7	(South Korea) Suwon Samsung Bluewings	1–1	0–6

== Quarter-finals ==
=== West Asia ===
Pos	Team	Pld	W	D	L	GF	GA	GD	Pts	Qualification
1	(Saudi Arabia) Al-Hilal (H)	3	2	1	0	3	0	+3	7	Advance to semi-finals
2	(Iran) Persepolis	3	1	2	0	1	0	+1	5	Advance to semi-finals
3	(Iraq) Al-Shorta	3	1	1	1	3	3	0	4	
4	(Kazakhstan) FC Irtysh	3	0	0	3	2	6	−4	0	

(H) Hosts
7 February 2000

Al-Hilal (Saudi Arabia)	2–0	(Kazakhstan) FC Irtysh
Al-Jumaan 40'; Al-Houwaidi 50'

Riyadh, Saudi Arabia
7 February 2000

Persepolis (Iran)	0–0	(Iraq) Al-Shorta

Riyadh, Saudi Arabia

9 February 2000

Al-Shorta (Iraq)	0–1	(Saudi Arabia) Al-Hilal
		Al-Jumaan 67'

Riyadh, Saudi Arabia
9 February 2000

Persepolis (Iran)	1–0	(Kazakhstan) FC Irtysh
Hasheminasab 78'

Riyadh, Saudi Arabia

11 February 2000

Al-Shorta (Iraq)	3–2	(Kazakhstan) FC Irtysh
Mahmoud 50'; Jeayer 64', 89'		Miroshichenko 27'; Mendes 85' (pen.)

Riyadh, Saudi Arabia
11 February 2000

Al-Hilal (Saudi Arabia)	0–0	(Iran) Persepolis

Riyadh, Saudi Arabia

=== East Asia ===
Pos	Team	Pld	W	D	L	GF	GA	GD	Pts	Qualification
1	(Japan) Júbilo Iwata	3	3	0	0	4	0	+4	9	Advance to semi-finals
2	(South Korea) Suwon Samsung Bluewings	3	1	1	1	5	2	+3	4	Advance to semi-finals
3	(Japan) Kashima Antlers	3	1	1	1	4	2	+2	4	
4	(Thailand) Sinthana	3	0	0	3	0	9	−9	0	

25 February 2000

Kashima Antlers (Japan)	1–1	(South Korea) Suwon Samsung Bluewings
Ogasawara 81'		Park Kun-ha 44'

Kagoshima, Japan
25 February 2000

Júbilo Iwata (Japan)	2–0	(Thailand) Sinthana
Radchenko 73', 90'

Kagoshima, Japan

27 February 2000

Júbilo Iwata (Japan)	1–0	(Japan) Kashima Antlers
Oku 21'

Kagoshima, Japan
27 February 2000

Suwon Samsung Bluewings (South Korea)	4–0	(Thailand) Sinthana
Lee Gi-beom 4'; Shin Hong-gi 19' (pen.); Park Kun-ha 38'; Paraknhyevych 90'

Kagoshima, Japan

29 February 2000

Júbilo Iwata (Japan)	1–0	(South Korea) Suwon Samsung Bluewings
Fujita 19'

Kagoshima, Japan
29 February 2000

Kashima Antlers (Japan)	3–0	(Thailand) Sinthana
Hirase 14'; Nakata 32'; Motoyama 88'

Kagoshima, Japan

== Semi-finals ==
20 April 2000

Al-Hilal (Saudi Arabia)	1–0	(South Korea) Suwon Samsung Bluewings
Ricardo 11'

King Fahd International Stadium, Riyadh
Referee: Lu Jun (China)

20 April 2000

Júbilo Iwata (Japan)	2–0	(Iran) Persepolis
Takahara 67'; Nakayama 90'

King Fahd International Stadium, Riyadh

== Third place match ==
22 April 2000

Persepolis (Iran)	1–0	(South Korea) Suwon Samsung Bluewings
Karimi 75'

King Fahd International Stadium, Riyadh

== Final ==
22 April 2000

Al-Hilal (Saudi Arabia)	3–2 (a.e.t.)	(Japan) Júbilo Iwata
Ricardo 3', 89', 102'		Nakayama 18'; Takahara 19'

King Fahd International Stadium, Riyadh
Attendance: 40,000
Referee: Selearajen Subramaniam (Malaysia)
