= Han Jung-kook =

South Korean footballer

Han Jung-kook 한정국
Personal information
- Full name: Han Jung-kook
- Date of birth: 19 July 1971 (age 55)
- Place of birth: South Korea
- Height: 1.79 m (5 ft 10 1/2 in)

Youth career
- Hanyang University

Senior career*
Years	Team	Apps	(Gls)
1994–1999	Ilhwa Chunma / Cheonan Ilhwa	64	(4)
1999–2000	Jeonnam Dragons	13	(1)
2001–2004	Daejeon Citizen	74	(5)

International career^{‡}
1991–1992	South Korea U-23	3	(0)
1994–1996	South Korea	11	(0)
- * Club domestic league appearances and goals as of 16 December 2012 ‡ National team caps and goals as of 16 December 2012

Han Jung-kook (Korean: 한정국; born 19 July 1971) is a South Korean footballer.

== Club career ==
Han has spent most of his club career playing for Ilhwa Chunma and Daejeon Citizen

== International career ==
He has played in 1992 Summer Olympics.

== Football Officials ==
He was appointed Secretary General of Busan IPark. He was the first Secretary General from players

== Honours ==
=== Club ===
Ilhwa Chunma

- K League (2) 1994, 1995
- Asian Club Championship (1) 1995
