= 2000 Asian Super Cup =

- Event: 2000 Asian Super Cup
Al Hilal	Shimizu S-Pulse
3	2

First leg
Al Hilal	Shimizu S-Pulse
2	1
- Date: 3 December 2000
- Venue: Nihondaira Sports Stadium, Shizuoka, Shizuoka, Japan
- Referee: M. Mahmoud al-Abbas
- Attendance: 8,027

Second leg
Shimizu S-Pulse	Al Hilal
1	1
- Date: 11 December 2000
- Venue: King Fahd International Stadium, Riyadh, Saudi Arabia
- Attendance: 43,107

The 2000 Asian Super Cup was the 6th Asian Super Cup, a football match played between the winners of the previous season's Asian Club Championship and Asian Cup Winners Cup competitions. The 2000 competition was contested by Al Hilal of Saudi Arabia, who won the 1999-2000 Asian Club Championship, and Shimizu S-Pulse of Japan, the winners of the 1999–2000 Asian Cup Winners' Cup.

== Route to the Super Cup ==
=== Al-Hilal ===
Opponents	Round	Score^{1}	Al-Hilal goalscorers
(Qatar) Al Sadd	Second round	3–1	Jasem Al-Huwaidi 16', 15', 22'
(Kazakhstan) Irtysh Pavlodar	Quarterfinals	2–0	Ruslan Gumar 40'(og), Jassem Al Houwaidi 50'
(Iraq) Al Shorta	Quarterfinals	1–0	Al Doussari 67'
(Iran) Persepolis	Quarterfinals	0–0	
(South Korea) Suwon Samsung Bluewings	Semifinals	1–0	Sergio Ricardo 11'
(Japan) Júbilo Iwata	Final	3–2 (AET)	Sergio Ricardo 3' 89' 102'

^{1}Al-Hilal goals always recorded first.

=== Shimizu S-Pulse ===
Opponents	Round	Score^{1}	Shimizu S-Pulse goalscorers
(China) Shanghai Shenhua	Second round	2–0	?
(South Korea) Anyang LG Cheetahs	Quarterfinals	5–2	?
(Thailand) Bangkok Bank	Semifinals	0–0^{(AET, 4 PK 2)}	
(Iraq) Al-Zawraa	Final	1–0	Shohei Ikeda 74'

^{1}Shimizu S-Pulse goals always recorded first.

== Game summary ==
Team 1	Agg.	Team 2	1st leg	2nd leg
Shimizu S-Pulse (Japan)	2–3	(Saudi Arabia) Al Hilal	1–2	1–1

=== First leg ===
3 December 2000
19:00 UTC+9

Shimizu S-Pulse (Japan)	1–2	(Saudi Arabia) Al Hilal
Carlos dos Santos 48'	(Report)	Ricardo Pérez 35' (p) 45+1'

Nihondaira Sports Stadium

=== Second leg ===
11 December 2000
20:30 UTC+3

Al Hilal (Saudi Arabia)	1–1	(Japan) Shimizu S-Pulse
Al-Ghamdi 70'	(Report)	Ichikawa 29'

King Fahd International Stadium, Riyadh
Attendance: 43,107
Referee: Lu Jun (China)

GK	1	(Saudi Arabia) Mohamed Al-Deayea
RB	2	(Saudi Arabia) Ahmed Dokhi
CB	16	(Saudi Arabia) Abdullah Al-Shareedah	(substituted off) 51'
CB	17	(Saudi Arabia) Fahed Al-Mofarij
LB	3	(Saudi Arabia) Mohammed Al-Nazhan
MF	6	(Nigeria) Mbwas Mangut
MF	10	(Saudi Arabia) Faisal Abu Thnain (c)	(substituted off) 71'
MF	11	(Saudi Arabia) Nawaf Al-Temyat
MF	13	(Saudi Arabia) Omar Al-Ghamdi
MF	20	(Saudi Arabia) Mohammad Al-Shalhoub	(substituted off) ??'
FW	9	(Colombia) Ricardo Pérez
Substitutes:
GK	22	(Saudi Arabia) Hassan Al-Otaibi
DF	5	(Saudi Arabia) Ahmed Khalil	(substituted on) 51'
DF	24	(Saudi Arabia) Bandar Al-Mutairi
MF	18	(Saudi Arabia) Hussain Al-Masaari	(substituted on) ??'
MF	19	(Saudi Arabia) Mansour Al-Shahrani	(substituted on) 71'
FW	7	(Saudi Arabia) Abdullah Al-Jamaan
FW	12	(Senegal) Diene Faye
Manager:
(Romania) Ilie Balaci

GK	1	(Japan) Masanori Sanada
DF	2	(Japan) Toshihide Saito
DF	3	(Japan) Takuma Koga
DF	11	(Japan) Ryuzo Morioka
DF	25	(Japan) Daisuke Ichikawa
MF	5	(Brazil) Santos
MF	7	(Japan) Teruyoshi Ito
MF	8	(Brazil) Alessandro Santos
MF	10	(Japan) Masaaki Sawanobori (c)
MF	16	(Japan) Yasuhiro Yoshida
FW	9	(Japan) Sotaro Yasunaga
Substitutes:
GK	20	(Japan) Keisuke Hada
DF	14	(Japan) Tsuyoshi Tanikawa
DF	19	(Japan) Shohei Ikeda
DF	25	(Japan) Kazumichi Takagi
MF	13	(Japan) Kohei Hiramatsu
FW	15	(Japan) Yoshikiyo Kuboyama
FW	17	(Japan) Takayuki Yokoyama
Manager:
(England) Steve Perryman
