= Abdullah Al-Jumaan Al-Dosari =

Saudi Arabian footballer

Abdullah Al-Jumaan
Personal information
- Full name: Abdullah Mohamed Al-Jumaan Al-Dosari
- Date of birth: 10 November 1977 (age 48)
- Place of birth: Mecca, Saudi Arabia
- Height: 1.83 m (6 ft 0 in)
- Position: Striker

Youth career
- 1994–1998: Al-Hilal

Senior career*
Years	Team	Apps	(Gls)
1998–2007	Al-Hilal	88	(73)
2007	Al-Ahli Jeddah (loan)	4	(0)

International career
1996–2005	Saudi Arabia	43	(17)
- * Club domestic league appearances and goals

Abdullah Mohamed Al-Jumaan Al-Dosari (Arabic: عبدالله جمعان الدوسري; born 10 November 1977) is a Saudi Arabian footballer.

== Career ==
At the club level, Al-Dosari played most of his career for Al-Hilal. he play 88 game and scoring 93 goals. on 9 February 2007 he joined to Al-Ahali for six moth loan . he left Al-Hilal in September 2007 after Decision the coach of team Cosmin Olăroiu.

He also represented the Saudi Arabia national team, and took part at the 2002 FIFA World Cup. Al-Dosari won 43 caps, scoring 17 goals for Saudi Arabia.
