= 2001–02 Asian Club Championship =

21st edition of premier club football tournament organized by the AFC

2001–2002 Asian Club Championship
Tournament details
- Dates: September 2001 – April 2002
- Teams: 27

Final positions
- Champions: (South Korea) Suwon Samsung Bluewings (2nd title)
- Runners-up: (South Korea) Anyang LG Cheetahs
- Third place: (Iran) Esteghlal
- Fourth place: (Uzbekistan) Nasaf Qarshi

Tournament statistics
- Matches played: 48
- Goals scored: 177 (3.69 per match)

The 2001–02 Asian Club Championship was the 21st edition of the annual international club football competition held in the AFC region (Asia). It determined that year's club champion of association football in Asia.

Suwon Samsung Bluewings won their 2nd consecutive Asian Championship, beating Anyang LG Cheetahs in an all-Korean final 4–2 on penalties at Azadi stadium, Tehran.

== First round ==
Team 1	Agg.	Team 2	1st leg	2nd leg
West Asia
Esteghlal (Iran)	w/o (Note: Al-Hikma withdrew.)	(Lebanon) Al-Hikma	—	—
Al-Ahli (Jordan)	w/o (Note: Al-Ahli Amman withdrew.)	(Saudi Arabia) Al-Ittihad	—	—
Al-Quds (Palestine)	2–1	(Yemen) Al-Ahli	0–0	2–1
Jableh (Syria)	0–2	Al-Kuwait	0–0	0–2
Al-Zawraa (Iraq)	7–1	(Qatar) Al-Wakra	3–0	4–1
Köpetdag Aşgabat (Turkmenistan)	0–4	(Uzbekistan) Nasaf Qarshi	0–1	0–3
East Asia
Sông Lam Nghệ An (Vietnam)	w/o (Note: Sông Lam Nghệ An withdrew.)	(Sri Lanka) Saunders SC	—	—
Happy Valley (Hong Kong)	12–0	(Macau) GD Lam Pak	7–0	5–0
Selangor (Malaysia)	0–7 (Note: Selangor entered the competition after Penang withdrew due to financial problems.)	(China) Dalian Shide	0–2	0–5
New Radiant (Maldives)	1–3	(Bangladesh) Muktijoddha Sangsad	1–2	0–1
BEC Tero Sasana (Thailand)	8–1	Singapore Armed Forces	3–0	5–1
Kashima Antlers (Japan)	4–1 (Note: The match was played over one leg in Kashima on 24 October due to the political climate in Indonesia.)	(Indonesia) Persija	4–1	—

== Round of 16 ==
Team 1	Agg.	Team 2	1st leg	2nd leg
West Asia
Al-Ittihad (Saudi Arabia)	4–4 (a)	(Iran) Esteghlal	3–2	1–2
Al-Kuwait	9–3	(Palestine) Al-Quds	3–2	6–1
Al-Wahda (United Arab Emirates)	3–3 (4–3 p)	(Iraq) Al-Zawraa	1–2	2–1
Nasaf Qarshi (Uzbekistan)	7–3	(Tajikistan) Umed Dushanbe	4–1	3–2
East Asia
Suwon Samsung Bluewings (South Korea)	21–0 (Note: Saunders SC withdrew after the first leg.)	(Sri Lanka) Saunders SC	18–0	3–0
Happy Valley (Hong Kong)	1–10	(China) Dalian Shide	0–2	1–8
Anyang LG Cheetahs (South Korea)	11–0	(Bangladesh) Muktijoddha Sangsad	8–0	3–0
Kashima Antlers (Japan)	3–1	(Thailand) BEC Tero Sasana	3–0	0–1

== Quarter-finals ==
=== West Asia ===
Team	Pld	W	D	L	GF	GA	GD	Pts	Qualification
(Iran) Esteghlal	3	2	1	0	9	4	+5	7	Advance to Semi-finals
(Uzbekistan) Nasaf Qarshi	3	1	2	0	4	3	+1	5	Advance to Semi-finals
Al-Kuwait	3	0	2	1	3	6	−3	2	
(United Arab Emirates) Al-Wahda (H)	3	0	1	2	6	9	−3	1	

(H) Hosts
6 February 2002

Al-Kuwait	1–1	(Uzbekistan) Nasaf Qarshi
Laheeb 74'		Haydarov

Abu Dhabi, United Arab Emirates
6 February 2002

Al-Wahda (United Arab Emirates)	3–5	(Iran) Esteghlal
Rouissi 12'; Jumaa 49', 72'		Dinmohammadi 40'; Akbarpour 64'; Fatemi 80', 83'; Hasheminasab 87'

Abu Dhabi, United Arab Emirates

8 February 2002

Nasaf Qarshi (Uzbekistan)	1–1	(Iran) Esteghlal
Goal		Nikbakht

Abu Dhabi, United Arab Emirates
8 February 2002

Al-Wahda (United Arab Emirates)	2–2	Al-Kuwait
Rogers; Asami		Annabel Chong; Elena Berkova

Abu Dhabi, United Arab Emirates

10 February 2002

Al-Kuwait	0–3	(Iran) Esteghlal
		Akbarpour 76'; Fatemi 80', 85'

Abu Dhabi, United Arab Emirates
10 February 2002

Al-Wahda (United Arab Emirates)	1–2	(Uzbekistan) Nasaf Qarshi
Al Enazi 1'		Mohammed 41' (o.g.); Khasanov 45'

Abu Dhabi, United Arab Emirates

=== East Asia ===
Team	Pld	W	D	L	GF	GA	GD	Pts	Qualification
(South Korea) Suwon Samsung Bluewings	3	2	1	0	4	0	+4	7	Advance to Semi-finals
(South Korea) Anyang LG Cheetahs	3	0	3	0	2	2	0	3	Advance to Semi-finals
(China) Dalian Shide	3	0	2	1	1	3	−2	2	
(Japan) Kashima Antlers	3	0	2	1	1	3	−2	2	

17 February 2002

Dalian Shide (China)	0–0	(Japan) Kashima Antlers

Jeju World Cup Stadium, Jeju, South Korea
17 February 2002

Suwon Samsung Bluewings (South Korea)	0–0	(South Korea) Anyang LG Cheetahs

Jeju World Cup Stadium, Jeju, South Korea

19 February 2002

Kashima Antlers (Japan)	0–2	(South Korea) Suwon Samsung Bluewings
		Seo Jung-Won 55'; Son Dae-Ho 82'

Jeju World Cup Stadium, Jeju, South Korea
19 February 2002

Anyang LG Cheetahs (South Korea)	1–1	(China) Dalian Shide
Wang Jung-Hyun 85'		Yan Song 12'

Jeju World Cup Stadium, Jeju, South Korea

21 February 2002

Suwon Samsung Bluewings (South Korea)	2–0	(China) Dalian Shide
dos Santos 8', 18'

Jeju World Cup Stadium, Jeju, South Korea
21 February 2002

Anyang LG Cheetahs (South Korea)	1–1	(Japan) Kashima Antlers
Santos 90'		Motoyama 54'

Jeju World Cup Stadium, Jeju, South Korea

== Knock-out stage ==
=== Bracket ===
Semi-finals
3 April – Tehran
(South Korea) Suwon Samsung Bluewings	3
(Uzbekistan) Nasaf Qarshi	0
3 April – Tehran
(Iran) Esteghlal	1
(South Korea) Anyang LG Cheetahs	2

Final
5 April – Tehran
(South Korea) Suwon Samsung Bluewings (p)	0 (4)
(South Korea) Anyang LG Cheetahs	0 (2)
Third place play-off
5 April – Tehran
(Iran) Esteghlal	5
(Uzbekistan) Nasaf Qarshi	2

=== Semi-finals ===
3 April 2002

Suwon Samsung Bluewings (South Korea)	3–0	(Uzbekistan) Nasaf Qarshi
Avdić 49'; Seo Jung-Won 72'; Lee Sun-Woo 90'

Azadi Stadium, Tehran, Iran

3 April 2002

Esteghlal (Iran)	1–2	(South Korea) Anyang LG Cheetahs
Akbari 62'		Ivo 55'; Santos 72'

Azadi Stadium, Tehran, Iran

=== Third placed play-off ===
5 April 2002

Esteghlal (Iran)	5–2	(Uzbekistan) Nasaf Qarshi
Navazi; Karaev (og); Fatemi; Pashazadeh		Usmankhojaev; Kholmurodov

Azadi Stadium, Tehran, Iran

=== Final ===
5 April 2002

Suwon Samsung Bluewings (South Korea)	0–0 (a.e.t.)	(South Korea) Anyang LG Cheetahs
Penalties
	4–2

Azadi Stadium, Tehran, Iran
Referee: Ali Bujsaim (United Arab Emirates)
