= 2001 Asian Super Cup =

- Event: 2001 Asian Super Cup
Suwon Samsung Bluewings	Al Shabab
4	3

First leg
Suwon Samsung Bluewings	Al Shabab
2	2
- Date: 4 August 2001

Second leg
Al Shabab	Suwon Samsung Bluewings
1	2
- Date: 10 August 2001

The 2001 Asian Super Cup was the 7th Asian Super Cup, a football match played between the winners of the previous season's Asian Club Championship and Asian Cup Winners Cup competitions. The 2001 competition was contested by Suwon Samsung Bluewings of South Korea, who won the 2000–01 Asian Club Championship, and Al Shabab of Saudi Arabia, the winners of the 2000–01 Asian Cup Winners' Cup.

== Route to the Super Cup ==
=== Suwon Samsung Bluewings ===
Opponents	Round	Score^{1}	Suwon Samsung Bluewings goalscorers
(Maldives) Hurriyya	Second round	2–1	?
(Japan) Júbilo Iwata	Quarterfinals	0–3	
(Indonesia) PSM Makassar	Quarterfinals	8–1	Seo Jung-Won 6' 23' 25', Sandro Cardoso 11' 18', Park Kun-Ha 37', Ko Jong-Soo 45'(p) 79'
(China) Shandong Luneng Taishan	Quarterfinals	6–0	Ko Jong-Soo 8' 38', Denis Laktionov 28', Seo Dong-Won 48' 59', Sabo Zoltan 82'
(Iran) Persepolis	Semifinals	2–1	Seo Jung-Won 78', Park Kun-Ha 90'
(Japan) Júbilo Iwata	Final	1–0	Sandro Cardoso 15'

^{1}Suwon Samsung Bluewings goals always recorded first.

=== Al Shabab ===
Opponents	Round	Score^{1}	Al Shabab goalscorers
(Syria) Hutteen	Second round	2–1	?
(Jordan) Al Wahdat	Quarterfinals	3–2	?
(Iran) Esteghlal	Semifinals	3–2	Saeed Al-Owairan 15'(p), Abdullah Shehan 58', Khalid Al Dossary 87'
(China) Dalian Shide	Final	4–2	Abdullah Al Shahrani 24' (p), Abdullah Shehan 25' 48' 74'

^{1}Al Shabab goals always recorded first.

== Game summary ==
Team 1	Agg.	Team 2	1st leg	2nd leg
Suwon Samsung Bluewings (South Korea)	4–3	(Saudi Arabia) Al-Shabab	2–2	2–1

=== First leg ===
4 August 2001
19:00 GMT+9

Suwon Samsung Bluewings (South Korea)	2–2	(Saudi Arabia) Al-Shabab
Denis Laktionov 26'; Sandro Cardoso 55'		Abdullah Shehan 14'; Omar Hassi 86'

Referee: Subkhiddin Mohd Salleh (Malaysia)

=== Second leg ===
10 August 2001
20:55 GMT+3

Al-Shabab (Saudi Arabia)	1–2	(South Korea) Suwon Samsung Bluewings
Al-Waked 48'		Lee Ki-Hyung 49'; Seo Jung-won 57'

Prince Abdullah Al Faisal Stadium, Jeddah
