= Asian Cup Winners' Cup =

- Organiser(s): AFC
- Founded: 1990
- Abolished: 2002
- Region: Asia
- Last champions: (Saudi Arabia) Al-Hilal (2nd title)
- Most championships: (Saudi Arabia) Al-Hilal (Japan) Yokohama F. Marinos (2 titles each)
- Website: the-afc.com

The Asian Cup Winners' Cup was an Asian football club competition contested annually by the winners of domestic cup competitions. The cup was chronologically the second seasonal inter-Asian club competition organised by the Asian Football Confederation (AFC). The tournament was started in 1990–91 and ran for 12 seasons, with the final edition held in 2001–02, after which it was discontinued to form the AFC Champions League. The winners of the Cup Winners' Cup used to contest the Asian Super Cup against the winners of the Asian Club Championship. The most successful clubs in the competition were Al-Hilal from Saudi Arabia and Yokohama F. Marinos from Japan with two titles each.

== History ==
Winners
Season	Winners
1990–91	(Iran) Persepolis
1991–92	(Japan) Nissan FC
1992–93	(Japan) Yokohama Marinos
1993–94	(Saudi Arabia) Al-Qadsiah
1994–95	(Japan) Yokohama Flügels
1995–96	(Japan) Bellmare Hiratsuka
1996–97	(Saudi Arabia) Al-Hilal
1997–98	(Saudi Arabia) Al-Nassr
1998–99	(Saudi Arabia) Al-Ittihad
1999–2000	(Japan) Shimizu S-Pulse
2000–01	(Saudi Arabia) Al-Shabab
2001–02	(Saudi Arabia) Al-Hilal

The competition was founded at the beginning of 1990 by the Asian Football Confederation, following the example of UEFA, the UEFA Cup Winners' Cup. For the first edition, seventeen clubs took part and Iranian club of Persepolis were the first winners, after defeating Bahraini Al-Muharraq in the final. Al-Hilal won the last championship in 2001–02, defeating Jeonbuk Hyundai Motors.

== Records and statistics ==
=== Performances by club ===
Performances in the Asian Cup Winners' Cup by club
Club	Title(s)	Runners-up	Seasons won	Seasons runner-up
(Saudi Arabia) Al-Hilal	2	0	1996–97, 2001–02	—
(Japan) Yokohama F. Marinos^{1}	2	0	1991–92, 1992–93	—
(Iran) Persepolis	1	1	1990–91	1992–93
(Saudi Arabia) Al-Nassr	1	1	1997–98	1991–92
(Saudi Arabia) Al-Qadsiah FC	1	0	1993–94	—
(Japan) Yokohama Flügels^{2}	1	0	1994–95	—
(Japan) Shonan Bellmare	1	0	1995–96	—
(Saudi Arabia) Al-Ittihad	1	0	1998–99	—
(Japan) Shimizu S-Pulse	1	0	1999–2000	—
(Saudi Arabia) Al-Shabab	1	0	2000–01	—
(Bahrain) Al-Muharraq	0	1	—	1990–91
(Hong Kong) South China	0	1	—	1993–94
(United Arab Emirates) Al-Shaab	0	1	—	1994–95
(Iraq) Al-Talaba	0	1	—	1995–96
(Japan) Nagoya Grampus	0	1	—	1996–97
(South Korea) Suwon Samsung Bluewings	0	1	—	1997–98
(South Korea) Jeonnam Dragons	0	1	—	1998–99
(Iraq) Al-Zawraa	0	1	—	1999–2000
(China) Dalian Shide	0	1	—	2000–01
(South Korea) Jeonbuk Hyundai Motors	0	1	—	2001–02

^{1} including Nissan FC.
^{2} Yokohama Flügels was merged with Yokohama Marinos to Yokohama F. Marinos in 1999.

=== Performances by nation ===
Performances in finals
Nation	Titles	Runners-up	Total
Saudi Arabia	6	1	7
Japan	5	1	6
Iran	1	1	2
South Korea	0	3	3
Iraq	0	2	2
Bahrain	0	1	1
China	0	1	1
Hong Kong	0	1	1
United Arab Emirates	0	1	1

=== Performances by coach ===
The following table lists the winning managers of the Asian Cup Winners' Cup.

Year	Club	Coach
1990–91	(Iran) Persepolis	(Iran) Ali Parvin
1991–92	(Japan) Nissan FC	(Japan) Hidehiko Shimizu
1992–93	(Japan) Yokohama Marinos	(Japan) Hidehiko Shimizu
1993–94	(Saudi Arabia) Al-Qadisiyah	(Czech Republic) Ján Pivarník
1994–95	(Japan) Yokohama Flugels	(Brazil) Antonio Carlos da Silva
1995–96	(Japan) Bellmare Hiratsuka	(Japan) Shigeharu Ueki
1996–97	(Saudi Arabia) Al Hilal	(Croatia) Mirko Jozić
1997–98	(Saudi Arabia) Al-Nassr	(Czech Republic) Dusan Uhrin
1998–99	(Saudi Arabia) Al-Ittihad	(Serbia) Dimitri Davidović
1999–2000	(Japan) Shimizu S-Pulse	(England) Steve Perryman
2000–01	(Saudi Arabia) Al-Shabab	(Brazil) Carlinhos
2001–02	(Saudi Arabia) Al Hilal	(Portugal) Artur Jorge

== See also ==
- List of Asian Cup Winners' Cup finals
