= Asian Super Cup =

- Organiser(s): AFC
- Founded: 1995; 31 years ago
- Abolished: 2002; 24 years ago
- Region: Asia
- Teams: 2
- Most championships: (Saudi Arabia) Al-Hilal (South Korea) Suwon Samsung Bluewings (2 titles each)

The Asian Super Cup was an annual football competition between the winners of the Asian Club Championship and the Asian Cup Winners' Cup.

The competition started in 1995, but came to an end in 2002 after both major AFC tournaments were merged into the AFC Champions League. The most successful clubs are Al-Hilal of Saudi Arabia and Suwon Samsung Bluewings of South Korea, both with two titles apiece.

== History ==
Key: Qualified as ACC winner Qualified as ACWC winner Abbreviations: ACC = Asian Club Championship; ACWC = Asian Cup Winners' Cup
Season	Winner
1995	(Japan) Yokohama Flügels
1996	(South Korea) Cheonan Ilhwa Chunma
1997	(Saudi Arabia) Al-Hilal
1998	(Saudi Arabia) Al-Nassr
1999	(Japan) Júbilo Iwata
2000	(Saudi Arabia) Al-Hilal
2001	(South Korea) Suwon Samsung Bluewings
2002	(South Korea) Suwon Samsung Bluewings

The Asian Super Cup was started in 1995 by the AFC, it was played in two legs. The Asian Super Cup pitted the winner of the Asian Club Championship against the winner of the Asian Cup Winners' Cup. In 2002, the Asian Club Championship and the Asian Cup Winners' Cup merged to form the AFC Champions League, as a result, the Asian Super Cup was discontinued. On only three occasions (in 1995, 1997 and 1998) did the winner of the Club Championship lost this competition.

== Matches ==
Key
Won after extra time or penalty shoot-out
Winner of Asian Club Championship
Winner of Asian Cup Winners' Cup

- The "year" column refers to the year the Super Cup was held, and links to the article about that match.
- The two-legged finals are listed in the order they were played.

Asian Super Cup matches
Year	Nation	Winners	Score	Runners-up	Nation	Venue
Two-legged format
1995	Japan	Yokohama Flügels	1–1	Thai Farmers Bank	Thailand	Suphan Buri Provincial Stadium
1995	Japan	Yokohama Flügels	3–2	Thai Farmers Bank	Thailand	Mitsuzawa Stadium
1995	Yokohama Flügels won 4–3 on aggregate					
1996	South Korea	Cheonan Ilhwa Chunma	5–3	Bellmare Hiratsuka	Japan	Changwon Stadium
1996	South Korea	Cheonan Ilhwa Chunma	1–0	Bellmare Hiratsuka	Japan	Hiratsuka Stadium
1996	Cheonan Ilhwa Chunma won 6–3 on aggregate					
1997	Saudi Arabia	Al-Hilal	1–0	Pohang Steelers	South Korea	King Fahd International Stadium
1997	Saudi Arabia	Al-Hilal	1–1	Pohang Steelers	South Korea	Pohang Steel Yard
1997	Al-Hilal won 2–1 on aggregate					
1998	Saudi Arabia	Al-Nassr	1–1	Pohang Steelers	South Korea	Pohang Steel Yard
1998	Saudi Arabia	Al-Nassr	0–0	Pohang Steelers	South Korea	King Fahd International Stadium
1998	1–1 on aggregate; Al-Nassr won on the away goals rule					
1999	Japan	Júbilo Iwata	1–0	Al-Ittihad	Saudi Arabia	Júbilo Iwata Stadium
1999	Japan	Júbilo Iwata	1–2	Al-Ittihad	Saudi Arabia	Prince Abdullah Al-Faisal Stadium
1999	2–2 on aggregate; Júbilo Iwata won on the away goals rule					
2000	Saudi Arabia	Al-Hilal	2–1	Shimizu S-Pulse	Japan	Nihondaira Sports Stadium
2000	Saudi Arabia	Al-Hilal	1–1	Shimizu S-Pulse	Japan	King Fahd International Stadium
2000	Al-Hilal won 3–2 on aggregate					
2001	South Korea	Suwon Samsung Bluewings	2–2	Al-Shabab	Saudi Arabia	Suwon Sports Complex
2001	South Korea	Suwon Samsung Bluewings	2–1	Al-Shabab	Saudi Arabia	Prince Abdullah Al-Faisal Stadium
2001	Suwon Samsung Bluewings won 4–3 on aggregate					
2002	South Korea	Suwon Samsung Bluewings	1–0	Al-Hilal	Saudi Arabia	Suwon World Cup Stadium
2002	South Korea	Suwon Samsung Bluewings	0–1 (a.e.t.)	Al-Hilal	Saudi Arabia	King Fahd International Stadium
2002	1–1 on aggregate; Suwon Samsung Bluewings won 4–2 on penalty shoot-out					

== Records and statistics ==
=== Winners ===
Performance in the Asian Super Cup by club
Club	Winners	Runners-up	Years won	Years runners-up
(Saudi Arabia) Al-Hilal	2	1	1997, 2000	2002
(South Korea) Suwon Samsung Bluewings	2	0	2001, 2002	—
(Japan) Yokohama Flügels	1	0	1995	—
(South Korea) Cheonan Ilhwa Chunma	1	0	1996	—
(Saudi Arabia) Al-Nassr	1	0	1998	—
(Japan) Júbilo Iwata	1	0	1999	—
(South Korea) Pohang Steelers	0	2	—	1997, 1998
(Thailand) Thai Farmers Bank	0	1	—	1995
(Japan) Shonan Bellmare	0	1	—	1996
(Saudi Arabia) Al-Ittihad	0	1	—	1999
(Japan) Shimizu S-Pulse	0	1	—	2000
(Saudi Arabia) Al-Shabab	0	1	—	2001

=== By nation ===
Performance by nation
Nation	Winners	Runners-up	Total
Saudi Arabia	3	3	6
South Korea	3	2	5
Japan	2	2	4
Thailand	0	1	1

=== By method of qualification ===
Asian Super Cup winners by method of qualification
Cup	Winners	Runners-up
Asian Club Championship	5	3
Asian Cup Winners' Cup	3	5

=== By winning coaches ===
The following table lists the winning coaches of the Asian Super Cup.

Year	Club	Coach
1995	(Japan) Yokohama Flügels	(Brazil) Antonio Carlos da Silva
1996	(South Korea) Cheonan Ilhwa Chunma	(South Korea) Lee Jang-soo
1997	(Saudi Arabia) Al-Hilal	(Brazil) José Oscar Bernardi
1998	(Saudi Arabia) Al-Nassr	(Brazil) José Dutra dos Santos
1999	(Japan) Júbilo Iwata	(Japan) Takashi Kuwahara
2000	(Saudi Arabia) Al-Hilal	(Romania) Ilie Balaci
2001	(South Korea) Suwon Bluewings	(South Korea) Kim Ho
2002	(South Korea) Suwon Bluewings	(South Korea) Kim Ho
