= 1978–79 in Vietnamese football =

83rd season of competitive football in Vietnam

Football in Vietnam
- Season: 1978–79

Men's football
- Hồng Hà League: Quan Khu Thu Do
- Trường Sơn League: Cong nhan Nghia Binh
- Cửu Long League: Saigon Port FC

The 1978–79 season was the 83rd season of competitive football in Vietnam.

== Honours ==
| Competition | Winner |
|---|---|
| Northern Vietnam | Quan Khu Thu Do (1) |
| Central Vietnam | Cong nhan Nghia Binh |
| Southern Vietnam | Saigon Port FC (3) |

Notes = Number in parentheses is the times that club has won that honour.

== League tables ==
=== Hồng Hà League (North Vietnam Football Championship) ===
| Pos | Team | Pld | W | D | L | GF | GA | GD | Pts | Qualification |
|---|---|---|---|---|---|---|---|---|---|---|
| 1 | Quân Khu Thủ Đô (C) | 5 | 3 | 2 | 0 | 10 | 4 | +6 | 8 | Champions and qualification to V-League |
| 2 | Quân Đội | 5 | 2 | 2 | 1 | 7 | 5 | +2 | 6 | Qualification for Northern & Southern Vietnam play-off and V-League |
| 3 | Công An Hà Nội | 5 | 1 | 4 | 0 | 9 | 8 | +1 | 6 | Qualification to V-League |
| 4 | Tổng Cục Đường Sắt | 5 | 2 | 1 | 2 | 8 | 11 | −3 | 5 | Qualification to V-League |
| 5 | Phòng Không | 5 | 1 | 2 | 2 | 6 | 6 | 0 | 4 | Qualification to V-League |
| 6 | Cảng Hải Phòng | 5 | 0 | 1 | 4 | 5 | 11 | −6 | 1 | Qualification to V-League |

Source: RSSSF
Rules for classification: 1) Points; 2) Goal difference; 3) Goals scored.
(C) Champions

=== Trường Sơn League (Central Vietnam Football Championship) ===
| Pos | Team | Pld | W | D | L | GF | GA | GD | Pts | Qualification |
|---|---|---|---|---|---|---|---|---|---|---|
| 1 | Công nhân Nghĩa Bình (C) | 5 | 4 | 0 | 1 | 9 | 6 | +3 | 8 | Champions and qualification to V-League |
| 2 | Phú Khánh | 5 | 3 | 0 | 2 | 7 | 8 | −1 | 6 | Qualification to V-League |
| 3 | Cong Nhân Quảng Nam-Đà Nẵng | 5 | 1 | 2 | 2 | 8 | 7 | +1 | 4 | |
| 4 | Công An Đà Nẵng | 5 | 1 | 2 | 2 | 6 | 6 | 0 | 4 | |
| 5 | Công Nhân Bình Trị Thiên | 5 | 2 | 0 | 3 | 5 | 6 | −1 | 4 | |
| 6 | Công An Nghĩa Bình | 5 | 1 | 2 | 2 | 8 | 10 | −2 | 4 | |

Source: RSSSF
Rules for classification: 1) Points; 2) Goal difference; 3) Goals scored.
(C) Champions

=== Cửu Long League (Southern Vietnam Football Championship) ===
| Pos | Team | Pld | W | D | L | GF | GA | GD | Pts | Qualification |
|---|---|---|---|---|---|---|---|---|---|---|
| 1 | Saigon Port (C) | 10 | 7 | 3 | 0 | 17 | 7 | +10 | 27 | Champions and qualification to Northern & Southern Vietnam play-off & V-League |
| 2 | Hải Quan | 10 | 5 | 3 | 2 | 20 | 13 | +7 | 23 | Qualification to V-League |
| 3 | Xây Lập Công Nghiệp | 10 | 4 | 3 | 3 | 13 | 14 | −1 | 21 | Qualification to V-League |
| 4 | Công Nghiệp Thực Phẩm | 10 | 3 | 3 | 4 | 10 | 9 | +1 | 19 | Qualification to V-League |
| 5 | Công Nhân Hóa Chất | 10 | 2 | 2 | 6 | 13 | 20 | −7 | 16 | |
| 6 | Bưu Điện | 10 | 1 | 2 | 7 | 8 | 18 | −10 | 14 | |

Source: RSSSF
Rules for classification: 1) Points; 2) Goal difference; 3) Goals scored.
(C) Champions

=== Northern/Southern Vietnam play-offs ===
20 May 1979

| Quan Doi FC | 2–1 | Saigon Port FC |
|---|---|---|
| | Report |

Hanoi Stadium, Đống Đa, Hanoi
