= 1978–79 Vietnam Football Championship =

4th season of Vietnam Football Championship since country's reunification

Vietnam Football Championship
- Season: 1978–79
- Champions: Quân Khu Thủ Đô (Northern); Công Nhân Nghĩa Bình (Central); Saigon Port (Southern)

The 1978–79 Vietnam Football Championship was the 4th season of the Vietnamese top flight since the country's reunification, and the last season before the establishment of the Vietnamese Football League.

== Northern Vietnam ==
North Vietnam Football Championship
- Season: 1978–79
- Champions: Quan Khu Thu Do; 1st North Vietnam V-League title 1st Northern Vietnam title
- Matches: 30
- Goals: 90 (3 per match)
- Top goalscorer: N/A
- Longest winning run: 3 matches Quan Khu Thu Do
- Longest unbeaten run: 5 matches Quan Khu Thu Do
- Longest winless run: 5 matches Cang Haiphong
- Longest losing run: 4 matches Cang Haiphong

=== Table ===
Pos	Team	Pld	W	D	L	GF	GA	GD	Pts	Qualification
1	Quân Khu Thủ Đô (C)	5	3	2	0	10	4	+6	8	Champions and qualification to V-League
2	Quân Đội	5	2	2	1	7	5	+2	6	Qualification for Northern & Southern Vietnam play-off and V-League
3	Công An Hà Nội	5	1	4	0	9	8	+1	6	Qualification to V-League
4	Tổng Cục Đường Sắt	5	2	1	2	8	11	−3	5	Qualification to V-League
5	Phòng Không	5	1	2	2	6	6	0	4	Qualification to V-League
6	Cảng Hải Phòng	5	0	1	4	5	11	−6	1	Qualification to V-League

Source: RSSSF
Rules for classification: 1) Points; 2) Goal difference; 3) Goals scored.
(C) Champions

== Central Vietnam ==
Central Vietnam V-League
- Season: 1978–79
- Champions: Công nhân Nghĩa Bình
- Matches: 30
- Goals: 86 (2.87 per match)
- Top goalscorer: N/A
- Longest winning run: 4 matches Quan Khu Thu Do
- Longest unbeaten run: 4 matches Quan Khu Thu Do
- Longest winless run: 4 matches Cong an Nghia Binh

=== Table ===
Pos	Team	Pld	W	D	L	GF	GA	GD	Pts	Qualification
1	Công nhân Nghĩa Bình (C)	5	4	0	1	9	6	+3	8	Champions and qualification to V-League
2	Phú Khánh	5	3	0	2	7	8	−1	6	Qualification to V-League
3	Công Nhân Quảng Nam-Đà Nẵng	5	1	2	2	8	7	+1	4	
4	Công An Đà Nẵng	5	1	2	2	6	6	0	4	
5	Công Nhân Bình Trị Thiên	5	2	0	3	5	6	−1	4	
6	Công An Nghĩa Bình	5	1	2	2	8	10	−2	4	

Source: RSSSF
Rules for classification: 1) Points; 2) Goal difference; 3) Goals scored.
(C) Champions

== Southern Vietnam ==
South Vietnam Football Championship
- Season: 1978–79
- Champions: Saigon Port
- Matches: 60
- Goals: 162 (2.7 per match)
- Top goalscorer: Nguyễn Văn Thòn (8 goals)
- Longest winning run: 7 matches Saigon Port
- Longest unbeaten run: 10 matches Saigon Port
- Longest winless run: 9 matches Bưu Điện
- Longest losing run: 7 matches Bưu Điện

=== Table ===
Pos	Team	Pld	W	D	L	GF	GA	GD	Pts	Qualification
1	Saigon Port (C)	10	7	3	0	17	7	+10	27	Champions and qualification to Northern & Southern Vietnam play-off & V-League
2	Hải Quan	10	5	3	2	20	13	+7	23	Qualification to V-League
3	Xây Lập Công Nghiệp	10	4	3	3	13	14	−1	21	Qualification to V-League
4	Công Nghiệp Thực Phẩm	10	3	3	4	10	9	+1	19	Qualification to V-League
5	Công Nhân Hóa Chất	10	2	2	6	13	20	−7	16	
6	Bưu Điện	10	1	2	7	8	18	−10	14	

Source: RSSSF
Rules for classification: 1) Points; 2) Goal difference; 3) Goals scored.
(C) Champions

== Northern/Southern Vietnam play-off 1979 ==
20 May 1979

Quân Đội	2–1	Saigon Port
	Report

Hanoi Stadium, Hanoi
