= List of football clubs in Thailand =

This is a list of association football clubs in Thailand for 2025–26 season.

== Thai League 1 ==
- Ayutthaya United
- Bangkok United
- BG Pathum United
- Buriram United
- Chiangrai United
- Chonburi
- Kanchanaburi Power
- Lamphun Warriors
- Muangthong United
- Nakhon Ratchasima
- Port
- PT Prachuap
- Ratchaburi
- Rayong
- Sukhothai
- Uthai Thani

== Thai League 2 ==
- Bangkok
- Chainat Hornbill
- Chanthaburi
- Chiangmai United
- Kasetsart
- Khon Kaen United
- Mahasarakham SBT
- Nakhon Pathom United
- Nakhon Si United
- Nongbua Pitchaya
- Pattani
- Pattaya United
- Phrae United
- Police Tero
- Rasisalai United
- Sisaket United
- Songkhla
- Trat

== Thai League 3 ==
=== Thai League 3 Northern Region ===
- Chattrakan City
- Chiangrai City
- Kamphaengphet
- Khelang United
- Kongkrailas United
- Maejo United
- Northern Nakhon Mae Sot United
- Phitsanulok
- Phitsanulok Unity
- Rongseemaechaithanachotiwat Phayao
- Uttaradit Saksiam

=== Thai League 3 Northeastern Region ===
- Khon Kaen
- Khon Kaen Mordindang
- Muang Loei United
- Rasisalai United
- Roi Et PB United
- Suranaree Black Cat
- Surin City
- Surin Khong Chee Mool
- Ubon Kruanapat
- Udon United
- Yasothon

=== Thai League 3 Eastern Region ===
- ACDC
- Bankhai United
- BFB Pattaya City
- Chachoengsao Hi-Tek
- Chanthaburi United
- Fleet
- Marines
- Navy
- Padriew City
- Pluakdaeng United
- Saimit Kabin United

=== Thai League 3 Western Region ===
- Angthong
- Assumption United
- Hua Hin City
- Kanchanaburi City
- Lopburi City
- Maraleina
- PTU Pathum Thani
- Rajpracha
- Samut Songkhram City
- Saraburi United
- Thap Luang United

=== Thai League 3 Central Region ===
- AUU Inter Bangkok
- Chamchuri United
- Dome
- Kasem Bundit University
- Nonthaburi United
- North Bangkok University
- Prime Bangkok
- Royal Thai Air Force
- Royal Thai Army
- Samut Prakan
- Samut Sakhon City
- Thonburi United
- VRN Muangnont

=== Thai League 3 Southern Region ===
- Krabi
- MH Nakhon Si City
- Muang Trang United
- Nara United
- Pattani
- Phatthalung
- Phuket Andaman
- Ranong United
- Satun
- Songkhla
- Wiang Sa Surat Thani City
- Yala
- Yala City

== Thailand Semi-pro League ==
=== Thailand Semi-pro League Northern Region ===
- Chattrakan City
- Chiangrai TSC
- Lampang Sports School
- Nakhon Sawan
- Nan
- Phichit United
- Thailand National Sports University Chiangmai Campus

=== Thailand Semi-pro League Northeastern Region ===
- Hi-Tech Chaiyaphum United
- Pitchaya Bundit College
- Roi Et PB United
- Sisaket City
- Siwilai
- Ubon Poly United
- Udon Banjan United
- Vongchavalitkul University
- Warin Chamrap

=== Thailand Semi-pro League Eastern Region ===
- Banbueng
- Banbueng City
- Huasamrong Gateway
- Nakhon Nayok
- Padriew City
- Sakaeo Hitech Technology
- Sriracha Masa Japan
- TDIC Angsila Saensuk

=== Thailand Semi-pro League Western Region ===
- Ayothaya Warrior
- Kasetsart Academy
- Lopburi United
- Phachi City
- Ratchaburi United
- Samui United
- Samut Songkhram City

=== Thailand Semi-pro League Central Region ===
- BSL United
- Dome
- Futera United
- Look E-San
- Sathorn

=== Thailand Semi-pro League Southern Region ===
- Chumphon United
- Samui United

== Thailand Amateur League ==
=== Thailand Amateur League Northern Region ===
Club	Province	Years
Christ FC		
Star Power		
GhostGate FC		
Vachiralai United	Saraphi, Chiang Mai	
North - Vachiralai Chiangmai United	Chiang Mai	
Singhaneua Chiangmai	Chiang Mai	
Unseen Lamphun United	Lamphun	
Nan City	Nan	
Phrae FC	Phrae	
Rongsee Maechaithanachotiwat	Mae Chai, Phayao	
Thunghong United		
Blue Phoenix FC		
Chiang Kham United		
Khelang United		
Chiangrai FC	Chiang Rai	
Lamphun Ranger	Lamphun	
Dream Star		
WiangPing Ranger	Chiang Mai	
PRC Soccer Club		
Debsirin Chiangmai	Chiang Mai	
Chiangmai Country		
Northern Footballclub		
Chiangrai Dragon FC		
Phichit United	Phichit	
Naresuan FC		
Sawankhalok United		
Nakhon Sawan	Nakhon Sawan	1999
Hightech Thchnology		
Chattrakan city		
Thasung FC		
Srinakhon Town		
Paknampho	Nakhon Sawan	
Lomsak United		
HIM HIM Maesot Football Club		
PPK FC		
Phitsanulok Songkwae		
Mahathep United		
NGOB-DANG Kamphengphet		
Kongkrilas United		
Buengsamphan		
INDY Wichianburi FC		

=== Thailand Amateur League North Eastern Region ===
Club	Province	Years
KDC Solution		
Maha Sarakham Rajabhat University	Maha Sarakham	
Lawanpanit FC		
Nakhondonsiet FC		
Chumphae FC	Khon Kaen	2018
Banthaen VP United		
Nakhon Ratchasima Rajabhat University	Nakhon Ratchasima	
Mancha Arena Football Club		
Chandrubeksa Football Club		
Namphong United	Nam Phong, Khon Kaen	
Klongkham United		
ROI-ET 2018	Roi Et	
Matthayom Roi-Et United	Roi Et	
Sarakham Falcon		
Phukhieo United	Phu Khiao, Chaiyaphum	
Nakhon Phanom United 2520	Nakhon Phanom	
Kalasin United	Kalasin	2010
Thailand All Star		
Ban Chiang Peak-One City	Nong Han District, Udon Thani	
Kranuan FC	Kranuan, Khon Kaen	
Sakonnakhon United		
Phaomphrai Witthayakharn Football Club	Roi Et	
Pitchaya Bundit College	Nong Bua Lamphu	
Kalasin	Kalasin	
Phon Commercial and Technical College		
Nongkhai City	Nong Khai	
Udon Banjan United	Udon Thani	
Dontan PCCM FC	Mukdahan	
FC Mahasarakham	Maha Sarakham	
UD Young Boy Football Club		
Chaiyaphum Changsuek		
Sakonnakhon City	Sakonnakhon	
ARSA Football Club		
Komin BaDan Roi-Et FC	Roi Et	
Northeastern University	Khon Kaen	
College of Asian Scholars	Khon Kaen	
RERU FC	Roi Et	
UD Vessuwan		
Kantharalak United	Kantharalak, Sisaket	
Union Korat	Nakhon Ratchasima	2020
Amnatcharoen City	Amnat Charoen	
ROI-ET PB United	Roi Et	
Sisaketwittayalai FC	Sisaket	
BK12 Kantharalak City	Kantharalak, Sisaket	
Surin Hinkhon United	Surin	
Rasisalai United	Rasi Salai, Sisaket	2018
TK Academy Football Club		
SurindraYMA FC	Surin	
Sisaket City	Sisaket	2022
SBAC PSK FC	Sisaket	
Warin Chamrap FC	Warin Chamrap, Ubon Ratchathani	
Poly FC	Ubon Ratchathani	
Bongkotpetch United	Lam Plai Mat, Buriram	
UBON Rovers FC	Ubon Ratchathani	
Kada City Sawasdee Samunprai FC	Surin	
Roi Et Sport Club	Roi Et	
Loengnoktha United	Loeng Nok Tha, Yasothon	
UBON Kids City	Ubon Ratchathani	
JFAM United	Kantharalak, Sisaket	
Nakhonratchasima Prokick United	Nakhon Ratchasima	
Mercury FC		
Ti Yai Yaiyam Football Club		
SBAC Sisaket Football Club	Sisaket	
Roi Et Football Club	Roi Et	
X-Star Khueang Nai United	Khueang Nai, Ubon Ratchathani	
Suranaree Army 2 FC	Nakhon Ratchasima	
Surin 008	Surin	
Nakhonratchasima College	Nakhon Ratchasima	

=== Thailand Amateur League Eastern Region ===
Club	Province	Years
Padriew City	Chachoengsao	
Prachinburi City	Prachinburi	
Hi-tech Sakaeo	Sakaeo	
Phechburapha football club		
Angslla FC		
Nakhon Nayok	Nakhon Nayok	2009
Khlongchao Bollken FC		
Salalumduan FC		
Prachinburi United	Prachinburi	2010
Narathiwat FC		
FC Hallelujah		
Harmornious United		
Loma Pattaya FC		
Banbueng - Mabpai City		
Warship United		
Baanfootball Pattaya		
Pattaya City Sport Football Club		
Muangmin United		
Nikhom United		
Police Ladkrabang FC		
Ban Kaeng United		
Pholungka United		
T-United		
Khaobaisri	Rayong	2016
Sattahip FC		
BSB Pakkert City		
Pattaya United 2022		
EGY Thai FC		
Phanatnikhom FC		
FC Planet		
Burapha University		

=== Thailand Amateur League Western Region ===
Club	Province	Years
Kokkratorn City		
Saraburi Warriors	Saraburi	
Lamnarai City		
Bangkokthonburi University FC	Thawi Watthana, Bangkok	
Pakchong SCK		
Srinagarindra Samutsakorn		
Phachi City		
Lawoe United		
Lopburi United	Lopburi	
Khok Samrong City	Khok Samrong, Lopburi	
Hornbill Junior		
THE ZERO		
Muangkrung	Bangkok	2016
Lopburi City	Lopburi	2016
Saraburi City	Saraburi	
Tandaew FC		
APD United		
Nonthaburi City	Nonthaburi	
KU Kamphaengsaen FC	Nakhon Pathom	
MUSS FC		
KT United		
Tesabantumbonnongkhae		
Kanchanaburi City	Kanchanaburi	
FIFA Kamphaeng Saen City		
Thawiwatthana F.C.		
Watboat United		
Nakhonomnoi FC		
Ayothaya Warrior		
Bangluang Football Club		
MBF Amphawa FC		
Thapluang United		
Donmueang FC	Don Mueang, Bangkok	
PS Banmo FC		
Samutsongkhram City		
OLD Town Kamphengsaen		
Boran Kamphaengsaen United		
Lukha Vimarnmamourng FC		
Thonburi City	Thon Buri, Bangkok	
Rajamangala University of Technology Rattanakosin	Phutthamonthon, Nakhon Pathom	
Cha-am Thayang City		
NongKhae Police FC	Nong Khae, Saraburi	
Samutprakan Junior United	Samut Prakan	

=== Thailand Amateur League Bangkok Metropolitan Region ===
Club	Province	Years
Samut Prakan United	Samut Prakan	2009
Minburi City FC	Min Buri, Bangkok	
Thaispirit FC		
FC Bangsaotong	Bang Sao Thong, Samut Prakan	
Bangkok City FC		
Uthumphon United	Uthumphon Phisai, Sisaket	
BT United		
King Mongkut's University of Technology North Bangkok	Bang Sue, Bangkok	
Sathorn UTK FC	Sathon, Bangkok	
Teerachaipallet Samutprakan FC	Samut Prakan	
Immanuel Sport Foundation		
Ocel Media FC		
W&A Bangmod FC		
Kasetsart FC Academy		
Minburi United	Min Buri, Bangkok	
Pakkran United		
Rajdamern FC		
Phimai United		
Patumkongka Football Club		
Bangkapi Leon Spirit Sport		
Nongchok City		
Rattanakosin Krungthep FC	Bangkok	
Bangkok Football Academy		
Aidin Sport		
Ramkhamhaeng University	Bang Kapi, Bangkok	
Bangkhuntien FC		
Look E San		
Mahajak Samutprakan	Samut Prakan	
Navaminda Kasatriyadhiraj Royal Air Force Academy Football Club		
Pongnapha FC		
Dome	Pathum Thani	2014
Thonburi Forest FC	Bangkok	2018
Samutsakhon City	Samut Sakhon	
Srisaman Football Club		
Wang Noi City		
Futera United		
Prasit Samutsakhon Football Club		
Mitsa-hai FC		
Built King Cobra		
Sirisak Sport Club		
SPA Srongpol		
Lumplee Subdistrict Administrative Organization		
Sing Ubon FC	Ubon Ratchathani	
Singh Non FC		
DX Football Club		
Rose Asia Thanyaburi FC		
Institute of Entrepreneurial Science Ayothaya		
Power Kids FC		
Romklao United		
Yungthong United		
STK Muangnont		
Hippo FC	Bangkok	

=== Thailand Amateur League Southern Region ===
Club	Province	Years
Phangnga United	Phangnga	
Andaman Bluemarlin Phuket	Phuket	
Srivichai	Surat Thani	2017
Munagkhondee United		
Phatthalung City		
Wiangsa City		
Kanchana Forest		
ST Youth FC.		
Muangtrang United	Trang	
Southernbeach FC		
Bangkaew FC		
MH Nakhonsi FC		
Blnlha Songkhla City		
Songkhla Aslan TSU		
Songkhla City		
Auni Sport Football Club		
Langu City	La-ngu, Satun	
SKRU Sanfundantai FC		
KP Bannangsta FC		

== By provinces ==
Province	Thai League 1	Thai League 2	Thai League 3
Bangkok	Port	Bangkok F.C. Kasetsart Police Tero F.C.	Assumption United F.C. Chamchuri United F.C. AUU Inter Bangkok F.C. Kasem Bundit University F.C. North Bangkok University F.C. Prime Bangkok F.C. Royal Thai Army F.C. Thonburi United F.C.
Amnat Charoen			
Ang Thong			Angthong F.C.
Bueng Kan			
Buriram	Buriram United		
Chachoengsao			Chachoengsao Hi-Tek F.C. Pad Riew City F.C.
Chai Nat		Chainat Hornbill	
Chaiyaphum			
Chanthaburi		Chanthaburi F.C.	
Chiang Mai		Chiangmai United F.C.	Chiangmai F.C. Maejo United F.C.
Chiang Rai	Chiangrai United		Chiangrai City F.C.
Chonburi		Chonburi F.C.	ACDC F.C. Fleet United Siam Navy F.C. Baanfootball Pattaya F.C.
Chumphon			
Kalasin			
Kamphaeng Phet			Kamphaengphet F.C.
Kanchanaburi		Kanchanaburi Power F.C.	Kanchanaburi City F.C.
Khon Kaen	Khon Kaen United		Khon Kaen F.C. Khon Kaen Mordindang
Krabi			Krabi F.C.
Lampang		Lampang F.C.	Khelang United
Lamphun	Lamphun Warriors F.C.		
Loei			Muang Loei United
Lopburi			Lopburi City F.C.
Mae Hong Son			
Maha Sarakham			Mahasarakham F.C.
Mukdahan			
Nakhon Nayok			
Nakhon Pathom	Nakhon Pathom United F.C.		Thapluang United
Nakhon Phanom			
Nakhon Ratchasima	Nakhon Ratchasima F.C.		Suranaree Black Cat F.C.
Nakhon Sawan			Si Kwae City
Nakhon Si Thammarat		Nakhon Si United F.C.	
Nan			
Narathiwat			Nara United F.C.
Nong Bua Lamphu		Nongbua Pitchaya F.C.	
Nong Khai			
Nonthaburi	Muangthong United		VRN Muangnont F.C. Nonthaburi United F.C.
Pathum Thani	Bangkok United BG Pathum United		Dome F.C. Pathumthani University F.C. Royal Thai Air Force F.C. 2019 Rajpracha F.C. Maraleina F.C.
Pattani			Pattani F.C.
Phang Nga			
Phatthalung			Phatthalung F.C.
Phayao			
Phetchabun			
Phichit			
Phitsanulok			Chattrakan City F.C. Phitsanulok F.C. Pitsanulok Unity F.C.
Phetchaburi			
Phrae		Phrae United	
Phra Nakhon Si Ayutthaya		Ayutthaya United	
Phuket			Phuket Andaman F.C.
Prachinburi			Saimit Kabin United F.C.
Prachuap Khiri Khan	PT Prachuap F.C.		Hua Hin City F.C.
Ranong			Ranong United F.C.
Rayong	Rayong F.C.		Bankhai United F.C. Pluakdaeng United F.C.
Ratchaburi	Ratchaburi Mitr Phol		
Roi Et			Roi Et PB United F.C.
Sa Kaeo			
Sakon Nakhon			
Samut Prakan		Samut Prakan City F.C.	Customs United F.C. Samut Prakan F.C.
Samut Sakhon			Samut Sakhon City F.C.
Samut Songkhram			Samut Songkhram City F.C.
Saraburi			Saraburi United
Satun			Satun F.C.
Sing Buri			
Sisaket		Sisaket United F.C.	Raseesalai United
Songkhla			Songkhla F.C.
Sukhothai		Sukhothai F.C.	Krongkrailas United
Suphanburi		Suphanburi F.C.	
Surat Thani			PSU Surat Thani City F.C.
Surin			Surin City F.C. Surin Khongcheemool
Tak			Nakhon Mae Sot United F.C.
Trang			Muang Trang United
Trat	Trat F.C.		
Ubon Ratchathani			Ubon Kruanapat F.C.
Udon Thani			Udon United
Uthai Thani	Uthai Thani F.C.		
Uttaradit			Uttaradit F.C.
Yala			F.C. Yala Yala City F.C.
Yasothon			Yasothon F.C.

== Withdrawn/Suspended Clubs ==
- Inter Pattaya
- Lopburi
- Phetchaburi
- Saraburi
- Thamrongthai

== Former clubs ==
- Airforce Training College
- Ayutthaya Warrior (2016–2017)
- Bangkok Bank (1955–2008)
- Bangkok Bank of Commerce
- BBCU (1976–2017)
- Chiangmai (1999–2024)
- J.W. Police (2004–2016)
- Krung Thai Bank (1977–2009)
- Lampang (2010–2025)
- Pattaya United (1989–2018)
- Phuket (2009–2017)
- Police Cadet Academy
- Police United (1960–2017)
- Raj-Vithi (1968–2015)
- RBAC (1998–2016)
- Samut Prakan City (2018–2025)
- Thai Farmers Bank (1987–2000)
- TOT (1954–2016)
- TTM (1963–2016)

== See also ==
- Thai football records and statistics
- Thai clubs in the Asian Club Championship
- Thai clubs in the AFC Champions League
- Thai clubs in the AFC Cup
- List of women's football clubs in Thailand
