= Đỗ Thới Vinh =

Vietnamese footballer and coach

Personal information
- Date of birth: 6 June 1940
- Place of birth: Tân An, Cochinchina, French Indochina
- Date of death: 28 May 1993 (aged 52)
- Place of death: Ho Chi Minh City, Vietnam
- Height: 1.58 m (5 ft 2 in)
- Positions: Midfielder; inside right

Youth career
- 1954–1955: Tân Định-Hảm Sói
- 1956–1957: Phan Thiết

Senior career*
Years	Team	Apps	(Gls)
1957–1960	Quân Cụ		
1960–1962	Quan Thuế		
1962–1975	Tổng Tham Mưu		
1975–1977	Hải Quan		

International career
1958–1975	South Vietnam		

Managerial career
- 1976–1978: Sông Bé
- * Club domestic league appearances and goals

Đỗ Thới Vinh (6 June 1940 – 28 May 1993) was a Vietnamese footballer and manager. Given the nickname Vinh sói (Vinh baldhead), he was one of the best players in South Vietnam history.

== Career ==
Born in Tân An, Vinh grew up in Saigon. In 1957, he was recruited by Division of Honour team Quân Cụ. A year later, Vinh made his debut for South Vietnam national team. He took part in the 1959 SEAP Games and 1960 AFC Asian Cup. After the tournament, he moved to Quan Thuế, before joining Tổng Tham Mưu in 1962.

In 1966, Vinh played a crucial role to help South Vietnam win the 1966 Merdeka Tournament. In 1966 and 1967, he was invited to the "Asian All Star" team.

After his retirement, Vinh became the head coach of the newly created team Sông Bé from 1976 until 1978. His later years were marked by difficulties and he lived in poverty. He died in Ho Chi Minh City on 28 May 1993 due to complications from diabetes.
