= 1967 Asian Champion Club Tournament =

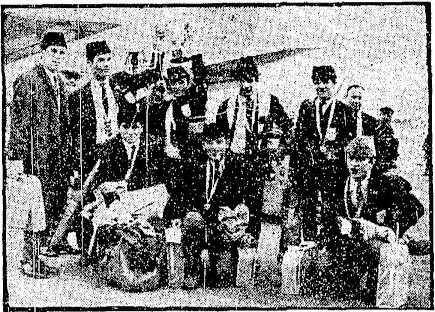
- Hapoel Tel Aviv players with the trophy in 1967

Tournament details
- Dates: 6 May – 19 December 1967
- Teams: 7 (6 competed)

Final positions
- Champions: (Israel) Hapoel Tel Aviv (1st title)
- Runners-up: (Malaysia) Selangor
- Third place: (South Korea) Korea Tungsten Company
- Fourth place: (Thailand) Bangkok Bank

Tournament statistics
- Matches played: 9
- Goals scored: 11 (1.22 per match)

The 1967 Asian Champion Club Tournament was the first edition of the annual Asian club football competition hosted by the Asian Football Confederation.

Six teams, as their respective country's domestic champions, competed in a knockout tournament to determine the first Asian champion: the Iranian FA did not send a team, while India's representative, Indian Railways, withdrew before the tournament due to excessive travel costs.

Hapoel Tel Aviv F.C. from Israel became the inaugural champions of Asia after defeating Selangor from Malaysia 2–1 in the final at Supachalasai Stadium, Bangkok, becoming one of only two teams in history to win their continent's main club competition while only playing one match (the other was Adelaide City, who won the 1987 Oceania Club Championship).

== Participants ==
Participants
Team	Qualifying method
(South Korea) Korea Tungsten Company	1966 Korean President's Cup champions
(Israel) Hapoel Tel Aviv	1965–66 Liga Leumit champions
(Malaysia) Selangor	1966 Malaysia Cup champions
(Thailand) Bangkok Bank	1966 Kor Royal Cup champions
(Hong Kong) South China	1965–66 Hong Kong First Division League champions
(South Vietnam) Vietnam Customs	1966–67 South Vietnam Division of Honour champions

=== Withdrawals ===
- (India) Indian Railways - 1964–65 Santosh Trophy champions
- (Iran) Shahin Tehran - 1965–66 Tehran Province League champions (strongest league before the inauguration of the Local League, first Iranian national championship)

== Teams location ==
Location of the 1967 Asian Champion Club Tournament teams

== Bracket ==
First round
(Israel) Hapoel Tel Aviv
bye
bye
(India) ~~Indian Railways~~
(South Korea) Korea Tungsten Company
bye
(Malaysia) Selangor	0	2	2
(South Vietnam) Vietnam Customs	0	1	1
(Hong Kong) South China	1	0	1
(Thailand) Bangkok Bank	0	2	2

Second round
(Israel) Hapoel Tel Aviv
bye
bye
(India) ~~Indian Railways~~
(South Korea) Korea Tungsten Company
bye
(Malaysia) Selangor	1	0	1
(Thailand) Bangkok Bank	0	0	0

Semi-finals
(Israel) Hapoel Tel Aviv	w/o
(India) ~~Indian Railways~~
(South Korea) Korea Tungsten Company	0	0	0
(Malaysia) Selangor	0	1	1

Final
(Israel) Hapoel Tel Aviv	2
(Malaysia) Selangor	1

== First round ==
Team 1	Agg.	Team 2	1st leg	2nd leg
Selangor (Malaysia)	2–1	(South Vietnam) Vietnam Customs	0–0	2–1
South China (Hong Kong)	1–2	(Thailand) Bangkok Bank	1–0	0–2
Korea Tungsten Company (South Korea)	bye			
Hapoel Tel Aviv (Israel)	bye^{1}			

^{1} Imperial of Iran Football Federation did not send a team.

=== First leg ===
6 May 1967

Selangor (Malaysia)	0–0	(South Vietnam) Vietnam Customs
	Report

Stadium Merdeka, Kuala Lumpur
Referee: Prida Rodphothong (Thailand)

18 May 1967

South China (Hong Kong)	1–0	(Thailand) Bangkok Bank
Wong Chi Keung 80'

Hong Kong Government Stadium, Hong Kong
Attendance: 8,500

=== Second leg ===
27 May 1967

Bangkok Bank (Thailand)	2–0	(Hong Kong) South China

Bangkok Bank Ground, Bangkok

3 June 1967

Vietnam Customs (South Vietnam)	1–2	(Malaysia) Selangor

Thống Nhất Stadium, Saigon

== Second round ==
Team 1	Agg.	Team 2	1st leg	2nd leg
Selangor (Malaysia)	1–0	(Thailand) Bangkok Bank	1–0	0–0
Korea Tungsten Company (South Korea)	bye			
Hapoel Tel Aviv (Israel)	bye			

=== First leg ===
15 July 1967

Selangor (Malaysia)	1–0	(Thailand) Bangkok Bank
Mydin 70'	Report

Stadium Merdeka, Kuala Lumpur

=== Second leg ===
29 July 1967

Bangkok Bank (Thailand)	0–0	(Malaysia) Selangor
	Report

Bangkok Bank Ground, Bangkok

== Semi-finals ==
Team 1	Agg.	Team 2	1st leg	2nd leg
Korea Tungsten Company (South Korea)	0–1	(Malaysia) Selangor	0–0	0–1
Hapoel Tel Aviv (Israel)	w/o^{1}	(India) Indian Railways		

^{1} Hapoel were drawn against (India) Indian Railways, who withdrew before the tournament due to excessive travel costs.

=== First leg ===
16 September 1967

Korea Tungsten Company (South Korea)	0–0	(Malaysia) Selangor
	Report

Hyochang Stadium, Seoul
Attendance: 10,000

=== Second leg ===
21 October 1967

Selangor (Malaysia)	1–0	(South Korea) Korea Tungsten Company
Mydin 12'	Report

Merdeka Stadium, Kuala Lumpur

== Final ==
19 December 1967
15:00 (UTC+8)

Hapoel Tel Aviv (Israel)	2–1	(Malaysia) Selangor
Borsuk 74'; Rachminovich 83' (pen.)	Report	Salim 54'

Supachalasai Stadium, Bangkok
Attendance: 12,000
Referee: Wanchai Suvaree (Thailand)
