= Lê Đức Tuấn =

Vietnamese footballer (born 1982)

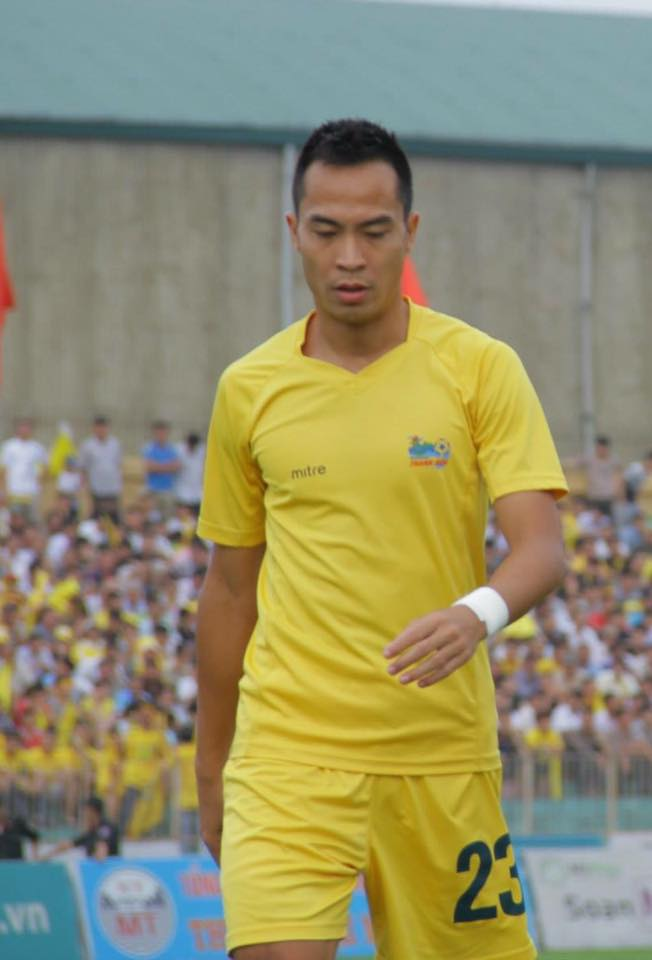
- Đức Tuấn with Thanh Hóa

Personal information
- Full name: Lê Đức Tuấn
- Date of birth: 13 June 1982 (age 44)
- Place of birth: Hanoi, Vietnam
- Height: 1.73 m (5 ft 8 in)
- Position: Left back

Team information
- Current team: SHB Đà Nẵng (head coach)

Senior career*
Years	Team	Apps	(Gls)
1999–2000	General Department of Railways		
2000–2011	Hà Nội ACB		
2011–2015	Thanh Hóa	78	(4)

International career
1998	Vietnam U16		
2003	Vietnam U23		

Managerial career
- 2016–2019: Phù Đổng
- 2020–2022: Hà Nội Youth
- 2022–2024: Hà Nội (assistant)
- 2023: Hà Nội (caretaker)
- 2024: Vietnam (assistant)
- 2024–2025: Hà Nội
- 2025–: SHB Đà Nẵng
Medal record
Vietnam Olympic
SEA Games
Silver medal – second place	SEA Games 2003	Football
- * Club domestic league appearances and goals

Lê Đức Tuấn (born 13 June 1982) is a Vietnamese football manager and former footballer and is currently the head coach of V.League 1 club SHB Đà Nẵng and the assistant coach of the Vietnam national team.

== Early life ==
He is the son of Vietnam international Lê Khắc Chính.

== Career ==
Throughout his career, Đức Tuấn mainly operated as a full-back. He played for Vietnamese side Hà Nội ACB between 2000 and 2011 and captained the club during a period. With the club he won the 2008 Vietnamese Cup and the 2010 V.League 2.

With Vietnam U23, Đức Tuấn featured in the 2003 SEA Games, hosted in his home country. In the final against Thailand, Đức Tuấn made a positioning mistake which allowed the opponent to score the only goal of the game. Aftermath was heavily criticized by the Vietnamese media and fans and was also suspected of match fixing, which almost forced him to retire.

After his retirement, Đức Tuấn became a manager. He coached Phù Đổng and managed to promote the club to the V.League 2. He then came back to his former club Hà Nội and worked as coach in the youth sectors. In 2022, he was promoted to the first team and became the assistant manager. In May 2024, following the appointment of Kim Sang-sik as Vietnam national team's head coach, Đức Tuấn was selected to become his assistant manager.

On 28 July 2024, Đức Tuấn was appointed as the head coach of Hà Nội. On 28 January 2025, he was dismissed from his role as head coach at Hanoi FC.

== Personal life ==
He has been married and has two children.

== Honours ==
Hà Nội ACB

- Vietnamese National Cup: 2008
- V.League 2: 2010

Vietnam U23

- Southeast Asian Games: Silver medal 2003
