= 1969 Asian Champion Club Tournament =

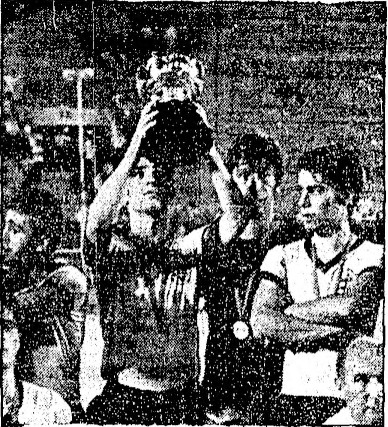
- Giora Spiegel of Maccabi Tel Aviv lifting the trophy

Tournament details
- Host country: Thailand
- Dates: 15 – 30 January 1969
- Teams: 10
- Venue: 1 (in 1 host city)

Final positions
- Champions: (Israel) Maccabi Tel Aviv (1st title)
- Runners-up: (South Korea) Yangzee
- Third place: (Japan) Toyo Kogyo
- Fourth place: (India) Mysore State

Tournament statistics
- Matches played: 24
- Goals scored: 85 (3.54 per match)

The 1969 Asian Champion Club Tournament was the 2nd edition of the annual Asian club football competition hosted by Asian Football Confederation. Ten domestic league champions from ten countries competed in the tournament. The tournament was held in Bangkok, Thailand and ten clubs were split in two groups of five. The group winners and the runners up advanced to semifinals.

Maccabi Tel Aviv defeated Korean club Yangzee and became the second Israeli club to win the competition.

== Participants ==
Participants
Team	Qualifying method
(Hong Kong) Kowloon Motor Bus	1966–67 Hong Kong First Division League champions
(Malaysia) Perak FA	1967 Malaysia Cup champions
(Japan) Toyo Kogyo	1967 Japan Soccer League champions
(Philippines) Manila Lions	1967 Manila Football League Championship champions
(Thailand) Bangkok Bank	1967 Kor Royal Cup champions
(Israel) Maccabi Tel Aviv	1966-68 Liga Leumit (extended season) champions
(India) Mysore State	1968–69 Santosh Trophy champions
(South Vietnam) National Police	1965–66 South Vietnam Division of Honour champions (Both the 1967–68 and the 1968–69 championships were not organized, so the winner of the 1965–66 championship was picked.)
(South Korea) Yangzee	1968 Korean President's Cup champions
(Iran) Persepolis	1968–69 Tehran Tournament champions

== Teams location ==
Location of the 1969 Asian Champion Club Tournament teams
Red: Group A; Blue: Group B

== Group stage ==
=== Group A ===
Pos	Team	Pld	W	D	L	GF	GA	GD	Pts	Qualification
1	(South Korea) Yangzee	4	4	0	0	17	1	+16	8	Advance to knockout stage
2	(India) Mysore State	4	2	1	1	5	8	−3	5	Advance to knockout stage
3	(Thailand) Bangkok Bank	4	1	2	1	6	3	+3	4	
4	(South Vietnam) National Police	4	1	1	2	10	7	+3	3	
5	(Philippines) Manila Lions	4	0	0	4	1	20	−19	0	

15 January 1969

Bangkok Bank (Thailand)	1–1	(South Vietnam) National Police

Supachalasai Stadium, Bangkok

15 January 1969

Yangzee (South Korea)	5–0	(India) Mysore State
Lee Hoe-taik (?); ? (?)	Report

Supachalasai Stadium, Bangkok

17 January 1969

National Police (South Vietnam)	7–0	(Philippines) Manila Lions

Supachalasai Stadium, Bangkok

19 January 1969

Mysore State (India)	1–1	(Thailand) Bangkok Bank
Kosalram 78'	Report	Muankasem 47' (pen.)

Supachalasai Stadium, Bangkok

20 January 1969

Yangzee (South Korea)	7–0	(Philippines) Manila Lions

Supachalasai Stadium, Bangkok

21 January 1969

Mysore State (India)	2–1	(South Vietnam) National Police
Kosalram 27', 78'	Report	Nguyễn Văn Long 8'

Supachalasai Stadium, Bangkok

22 January 1969

Yangzee (South Korea)	1–0	(Thailand) Bangkok Bank

Supachalasai Stadium, Bangkok

23 January 1969

Mysore State (India)	2–1	(Philippines) Manila Lions
Sadatulla 18'; Nagendran 37'	Report	Sajakul 82'

Supachalasai Stadium, Bangkok
Attendance: 1,000

24 January 1969

Yangzee (South Korea)	4–1	(South Vietnam) National Police

Supachalasai Stadium, Bangkok

26 January 1969

Bangkok Bank (Thailand)	4–0	(Philippines) Manila Lions

Supachalasai Stadium, Bangkok

=== Group B ===
Pos	Team	Pld	W	D	L	GF	GA	GD	Pts	Qualification
1	(Israel) Maccabi Tel Aviv	4	2	2	0	9	3	+6	6	Advance to knockout stage
2	(Japan) Toyo Kogyo	4	3	0	1	6	3	+3	6	Advance to knockout stage
3	(Iran) Persepolis	4	2	1	1	8	3	+5	5	
4	(Malaysia) Perak FA	4	1	1	2	9	9	0	3	
5	(Hong Kong) Kowloon Motor Bus	4	0	0	4	2	16	−14	0	

15 January 1969

Maccabi Tel Aviv (Israel)	3–2	(Japan) Toyo Kogyo
Asis 44'; Spiegel 63'; Shikva 68'		Kuwata 15'; Ogi 74' (pen.)

Supachalasai Stadium, Bangkok
Attendance: 35,000
Referee: Wanchai Suvaree (Thailand)

16 January 1969

Perak FA (Malaysia)	6–2	(Hong Kong) Kowloon Motor Bus

Supachalasai Stadium, Bangkok

17 January 1969

Toyo Kogyo (Japan)	1–0	(Iran) Persepolis
Matsumoto 47'

Supachalasai Stadium, Bangkok

19 January 1969
15:45 (UTC+8)

Maccabi Tel Aviv (Israel)	5–0	(Hong Kong) Kowloon Motor Bus
Shikva 6'; Spiegel 23', 66'; Asis 34', 67'

Supachalasai Stadium, Bangkok

20 January 1969

Persepolis (Iran)	4–2	(Malaysia) Perak FA
Vafakhah 14', 27'; Behzadi 81'; Vatankhah 89'		? (?)

Supachalasai Stadium, Bangkok
Attendance: 25,000

21 January 1969

Toyo Kogyo (Japan)	1–0	(Hong Kong) Kowloon Motor Bus

Supachalasai Stadium, Bangkok

22 January 1969

Maccabi Tel Aviv (Israel)	1–1	(Malaysia) Perak FA
Cohen 64'		? (?)

Supachalasai Stadium, Bangkok
Attendance: 30,000

23 January 1969

Persepolis (Iran)	4–0	(Hong Kong) Kowloon Motor Bus
Kalani 17'; Vafakhah 64', 74', 78'

Supachalasai Stadium, Bangkok

24 January 1969

Toyo Kogyo (Japan)	2–0	(Malaysia) Perak FA

Supachalasai Stadium, Bangkok

26 January 1969
15:45 (UTC+8)

Maccabi Tel Aviv (Israel)	0–0	(Iran) Persepolis

Supachalasai Stadium, Bangkok
Attendance: 20,000
Referee: Wanchai Suvaree (Thailand)

== Knockout stage ==
=== Bracket ===
Semi-finals
28 January – Bangkok
(Israel) Maccabi Tel Aviv	6
(India) Mysore State	1
28 January – Bangkok
(South Korea) Yangzee	2
(Japan) Toyo Kogyo	0

Final
30 January– Bangkok
(Israel) Maccabi Tel Aviv (a.e.t.)	1
(South Korea) Yangzee	0
Third place play-off
30 January – Bangkok
(Japan) Toyo Kogyo	2
(India) Mysore State	0

=== Semi-finals ===
28 January 1969

Maccabi Tel Aviv (Israel)	6–1	(India) Mysore State
Spiegel 1', 59', 85'; Shikva 18'; Cohen 58'; Talbi 79'		? (?)

Supachalasai Stadium, Bangkok
Attendance: 20,000
Referee: Luk Tat Sun (Hong Kong)

28 January 1969

Yangzee (South Korea)	2–0	(Japan) Toyo Kogyo

Supachalasai Stadium, Bangkok

=== Third-place match ===
30 January 1969

Toyo Kogyo (Japan)	2–0	(India) Mysore State
	Report

Supachalasai Stadium, Bangkok

=== Final ===
30 January 1969
15:45 (UTC+8)

Maccabi Tel Aviv (Israel)	1–0 (a.e.t.)	(South Korea) Yangzee
Bar-Nur 112'

Supachalasai Stadium, Bangkok
Attendance: 35,000
Referee: Wanchai Suvaree (Thailand)
