= Đỗ Cẩu =

Vietnamese footballer (born 1946)

Personal information
- Full name: Đỗ Cẩu
- Date of birth: 8 October 1946
- Place of birth: Phnom Penh, French Indochina
- Date of death: 16 June 2022 (age 75)
- Place of death: Ho Chi Minh City, Vietnam
- Position: Centre back

Senior career*
Years	Team	Apps	(Gls)
- Hải Xướng
1975-1980	Công Nghiệp Thực Phẩm		

International career
1971	South Vietnam U19		
1972-1975	South Vietnam		

Managerial career
- 1984-1987: An Giang II
- * Club domestic league appearances and goals

Đỗ Cẩu (8 October 1946 – 16 June 2022) was a former Vietnamese footballer who played as a centre back for South Vietnam national football team.

== Club career ==
In 1975, Đỗ Cẩu joined Công Nghiệp Thực Phẩm, a South Vietnam Football Championship team that located in Ho Chi Minh City. He was known for his key role at the club. In 1980, when he was 34 years old, he retired after the club get relegated to Second division.

== International career ==
In 1971, Cẩu played for the South Vietnam youth national team. One year later, in 1972, he became the first team defender for the senior national team, participating in many important tournaments.

In the final match of the 1973 SEAP Games in Singapore, despite leading Myanmar 1-0 with Trần Văn Xinh scoring, the South Vietnam team still lost 2-3. Đỗ Cẩu and the team earned the silver medal.

== Personal life ==
Đỗ Cẩu have two sons, Đỗ Văn Khải (born 1974) and Đỗ Văn Hùng (born 1975). Đỗ Văn Khải played for the Vietnam national team and was awarded the Vietnam Silver Ball in 2001. Đỗ Văn Hùng played for Vietnam U22 team in 1997.

== Honours ==
South Vietnam

- SEAP Games Silver medal: 1973

== See also ==
- List of Vietnam international footballers born outside Vietnam
