= Thai football clubs in Asian competitions =

Football clubs in the Thai League 1 compete in the AFC Champions League annually. This details the participation and performances in the competition since its based at 2002 as a result of the merger between the Asian Club Championship, the Asian Cup Winners' Cup and the Asian Super Cup.

== Thai clubs in AFC Champions League / ACL Elite (since 2002) ==
=== Participations ===
- Q: Qualifying Stage, GS: Group Stage, R16: Round of 16, QF: Quarterfinals, SF: Semifinals, RU: Runners-Up, W: Winners

Team	#	02–03	2004	2005	2006^{1}	2007	2008	2009	2010	2011	2012	2013	2014	2015	2016	2017	2018	2019	2020	2021	2022	23–24	24–25	25–26
Buriram United	13							Q			GS	QF	GS	GS	GS		R16	GS	Q		Q	GS	QF	QF
Muangthong United	7								Q	Q		GS	Q		Q	R16	Q							
Bangkok United	6					GS										Q		Q				R16	Q	Q
Chonburi	5						GS				Q		Q	Q	Q									
Chiangrai United	5																Q	Q	GS	GS	GS			
BG Pathum United	4													Q						R16	QF	GS		
Port	4																		Q	GS	Q	Q		
Police Tero	3	RU	GS	GS																				
Krung Thai Bank^{2}	3		GS	GS			GS																	
Osotspa	1	GS																						
Sukhothai	1															Q								
Ratchaburi	1																			GS				

^{1} PEA FC and TTM FC qualified for 2006 AFC Champions League group stage, but were later disqualified because of failing to fill in their player registration forms in time.
^{2} Club no longer exists.

=== Statistics by club ===
The table that follows is accurate as of the end of the 2025–26 season.

Overall Statistics
#	Team	Q	GP	W	D	L	GF	GA	GD	Pts	Best performance
1	(Thailand) Buriram United	13 Times	81	23	24	34	82	122	−40	93	Quarter-finals (2013, 2024–25, 2025–26)
2	(Thailand) BG Pathum United	4 Times	24	10	4	10	41	40	+1	34	Quarter-finals (2022)
3	(Thailand) Muangthong United	7 Times	23	6	6	11	26	39	−13	24	Round of 16 (2017)
4	(Thailand) Krung Thai Bank	3 Times	18	7	2	9	33	47	−14	23	Group stage (2004, 2005, 2008)
5	(Thailand) Chiangrai United	5 Times	20	5	6	9	20	31	−11	21	Group stage (2020, 2021, 2022)
6	(Thailand) Bangkok United	6 Times	18	4	7	7	19	24	–5	19	Round of 16 (2023–24)
7	(Thailand) Police Tero	3 Times	19	5	2	12	19	35	−16	17	Runners-up (2003)
8	(Thailand) Chonburi	5 Times	13	4	2	7	19	31	−12	14	Group stage (2008)
9	(Thailand) Port	3 Times	9	2	2	5	10	13	−10	8	Group stage (2021)
10	(Thailand) Osotsapa	1 Time	7	2	2	3	9	24	−15	8	Group stage (2002–03)
11	(Thailand) Sukhothai	1 Time	2	1	0	1	5	3	+2	3	Qualifying play-off (2017)
12	(Thailand) Ratchaburi	1 Time	6	0	2	4	0	10	−10	2	Group stage (2021)
Total											

Match won	Match drawn	Match lost

==== Bangkok United ====
Bangkok United results
Season	Round	Result	Opponent	Venue
2007	Group stage	0–0	(South Korea) Chunnam Dragons	Bangkok, Thailand
2007	Group stage	1–1	(Japan) Kawasaki Frontale	Kawasaki, Japan
2007	Group stage	0–0	(Indonesia) Arema Malang	Bangkok, Thailand
2007	Group stage	0–1	(Indonesia) Arema Malang	Malang, Indonesia
2007	Group stage	2–3	(South Korea) Chunnam Dragons	Gwangyang, South Korea
2007	Group stage	1–2	(Japan) Kawasaki Frontale	Bangkok, Thailand
2017	Preliminary round 2	1–1 (a.e.t.) (4–5 p)	(Malaysia) Johor Darul Ta'zim	Pathum Thani, Thailand
2019	Preliminary round 2	0–1	(Vietnam) Hanoi	Pathum Thani, Thailand
2023–24	Group stage	2–1	(Singapore) Lion City Sailors	Kallang, Singapore
2023–24	Group stage	3–2	(South Korea) Jeonbuk Hyundai Motors	Pathum Thani, Thailand
2023–24	Group stage	2–1	(Hong Kong) Kitchee	Causeway Bay, Hong Kong
2023–24	Group stage	1–1	(Hong Kong) Kitchee	Pathum Thani, Thailand
2023–24	Group stage	1–0	(Singapore) Lion City Sailors	Pathum Thani, Thailand
2023–24	Group stage	2–3	(South Korea) Jeonbuk Hyundai Motors	Jeonju, South Korea
2023–24	Round of 16	2–2	(Japan) Yokohama F. Marinos	Pathum Thani, Thailand
2023–24	Round of 16	1–0 (a.e.t.)	(Japan) Yokohama F. Marinos	Yokohama, Japan
2024–25	Play-off round	1–1 (a.e.t.) (3–4 p)	(China) Shandong Taishan	Jinan, China
2025–26	Play-off round	0–3	(China) Chengdu Rongcheng	Chengdu, China

==== BG Pathum United ====
BG Pathum United results
Season	Round	Result	Opponent	Venue
2015	Preliminary round 2	3–0	(Malaysia) Johor Darul Ta'zim	Pathum Thani, Thailand
2015	Play-off round	0–3	(China) Beijing Guoan	Beijing, China
2021	Group stage	4–1	(Philippines) Kaya–Iloilo	Pathum Thani, Thailand
2021	Group stage	0–2	(South Korea) Ulsan Hyundai	Pathum Thani, Thailand
2021	Group stage	2–0	(Vietnam) Viettel	Pathum Thani, Thailand
2021	Group stage	3–1	(Vietnam) Viettel	Pathum Thani, Thailand
2021	Group stage	1–0	(Philippines) Kaya–Iloilo	Pathum Thani, Thailand
2021	Group stage	0–2	(South Korea) Ulsan Hyundai	Pathum Thani, Thailand
2021	Round of 16	1–1 (a.e.t.) (2–4 p)	(South Korea) Jeonbuk Hyundai Motors	Jeonju, South Korea
2022	Group stage	1–1	(Australia) Melbourne City	Pathum Thani, Thailand
2022	Group stage	2–0	(South Korea) Jeonnam Dragons	Pathum Thani, Thailand
2022	Group stage	5–0	(Philippines) United City	Pathum Thani, Thailand
2022	Group stage	3–1	(Philippines) United City	Pathum Thani, Thailand
2022	Group stage	0–0	(Australia) Melbourne City	Pathum Thani, Thailand
2022	Group stage	0–0	(South Korea) Jeonnam Dragons	Pathum Thani, Thailand
2022	Round of 16	4–0	(Hong Kong) Kitchee	Saitama, Japan
2022	Quarter-finals	0–5	(Japan) Urawa Red Diamonds	Saitama, Japan
2023–24	Play-off round	3–2	(China) Shanghai Port	Shanghai, China
2023–24	Group stage	1–3	(South Korea) Ulsan Hyundai	Ulsan, South Korea
2023–24	Group stage	2–4	(Malaysia) Johor Darul Ta'zim	Pathum Thani, Thailand
2023–24	Group stage	2–4	(Japan) Kawasaki Frontale	Pathum Thani, Thailand
2023–24	Group stage	2–4	(Japan) Kawasaki Frontale	Kawasaki, Japan
2023–24	Group stage	1–3	(South Korea) Ulsan Hyundai	Pathum Thani, Thailand
2023–24	Group stage	1–4	(Malaysia) Johor Darul Ta'zim	Johor Bahru, Malaysia

==== Buriram United ====
Buriram United results
Season	Round	Result	Opponent	Venue
2009	Play-off round	1–4 (a.e.t.)	Singapore Armed Forces	Bangkok, Thailand
2012	Group stage	3–2	(Japan) Kashiwa Reysol	Buriram, Thailand
2012	Group stage	2–1	(China) Guangzhou Evergrande	Guangzhou, China
2012	Group stage	0–2	(South Korea) Jeonbuk Hyundai Motors	Buriram, Thailand
2012	Group stage	2–3	(South Korea) Jeonbuk Hyundai Motors	Jeonju, South Korea
2012	Group stage	0–1	(Japan) Kashiwa Reysol	Kashiwa, Japan
2012	Group stage	1–2	(China) Guangzhou Evergrande	Buriram, Thailand
2013	Play-off round	0–0 (a.e.t.) (3–0 p)	(Australia) Brisbane Roar	Buriram, Thailand
2013	Group stage	1–1	(Japan) Vegalta Sendai	Sendai, Japan
2013	Group stage	0–0	(South Korea) FC Seoul	Buriram, Thailand
2013	Group stage	0–2	(China) Jiangsu Sainty	Nanjing, China
2013	Group stage	2–0	(China) Jiangsu Sainty	Buriram, Thailand
2013	Group stage	1–1	(Japan) Vegalta Sendai	Buriram, Thailand
2013	Group stage	2–2	(South Korea) FC Seoul	Seoul, South Korea
2013	Round of 16	2–1	(Uzbekistan) Bunyodkor	Buriram, Thailand
2013	Round of 16	0–0	(Uzbekistan) Bunyodkor	Tashkent, Uzbekistan
2013	Quarter-finals	0–1	(Iran) Esteghlal	Tehran, Iran
2013	Quarter-finals	1–2	(Iran) Esteghlal	Buriram, Thailand
2014	Group stage	1–1	(China) Shandong Luneng Taishan	Jinan, China
2014	Group stage	1–2	(South Korea) Pohang Steelers	Buriram, Thailand
2014	Group stage	0–4	(Japan) Cerezo Osaka	Osaka, Japan
2014	Group stage	2–2	(Japan) Cerezo Osaka	Buriram, Thailand
2014	Group stage	1–0	(China) Shandong Luneng Taishan	Buriram, Thailand
2014	Group stage	0–0	(South Korea) Pohang Steelers	Pohang, South Korea
2015	Group stage	2–1	(South Korea) Seongnam FC	Buriram, Thailand
2015	Group stage	2–1	(China) Guangzhou R&F	Guangzhou, China
2015	Group stage	1–1	(Japan) Gamba Osaka	Suita, Japan
2015	Group stage	1–2	(Japan) Gamba Osaka	Buriram, Thailand
2015	Group stage	1–2	(South Korea) Seongnam FC	Seongnam, South Korea
2015	Group stage	5–0	(China) Guangzhou R&F	Buriram, Thailand
2016	Group stage	0–6	(South Korea) FC Seoul	Buriram, Thailand
2016	Group stage	0–3	(China) Shandong Luneng	Jinan, China
2016	Group stage	0–3	(Japan) Sanfrecce Hiroshima	Hiroshima, Japan
2016	Group stage	0–2	(Japan) Sanfrecce Hiroshima	Buriram, Thailand
2016	Group stage	1–2	(South Korea) FC Seoul	Seoul, South Korea
2016	Group stage	0–0	(China) Shandong Luneng	Buriram, Thailand
2018	Group stage	1–1	(China) Guangzhou Evergrande	Guangzhou, China
2018	Group stage	0–2	(South Korea) Jeju United	Buriram, Thailand
2018	Group stage	0–2	(Japan) Cerezo Osaka	Buriram, Thailand
2018	Group stage	2–2	(Japan) Cerezo Osaka	Osaka, Japan
2018	Group stage	1–1	(China) Guangzhou Evergrande	Buriram, Thailand
2018	Group stage	1–0	(South Korea) Jeju United	Jeju, South Korea
2018	Round of 16	3–2	(South Korea) Jeonbuk Hyundai Motors	Buriram, Thailand
2018	Round of 16	0–2	(South Korea) Jeonbuk Hyundai Motors	Jeonju, South Korea
2019	Group stage	0–3	(Japan) Urawa Red Diamonds	Saitama, Japan
2019	Group stage	1–0	(South Korea) Jeonbuk Hyundai Motors	Buriram, Thailand
2019	Group stage	1–3	(China) Beijing Guoan	Buriram, Thailand
2019	Group stage	0–2	(China) Beijing Guoan	Beijing, China
2019	Group stage	1–2	(Japan) Urawa Red Diamonds	Buriram, Thailand
2019	Group stage	0–0	(South Korea) Jeonbuk Hyundai Motors	Jeonju, South Korea
2020	Preliminary round 2	2–1	(Vietnam) Hồ Chí Minh City	Buriram, Thailand
2020	Play-off round	0–3	(China) Shanghai SIPG	Shanghai, China
2022	Play-off round	1–1 (a.e.t.) (2–3 p)	(South Korea) Daegu FC	Daegu, South Korea
2023–24	Group stage	4–1	(China) Zhejiang	Buriram, Thailand
2023–24	Group stage	0–1	(Japan) Ventforet Kofu	Tokyo, Japan
2023–24	Group stage	0–2	(Australia) Melbourne City	Buriram, Thailand
2023–24	Group stage	1–0	(Australia) Melbourne City	Melbourne, Australia
2023–24	Group stage	2–3	(China) Zhejiang	Huzhou, China
2023–24	Group stage	2–3	(Japan) Ventforet Kofu	Buriram, Thailand
2024–25	League stage	0–0	(Japan) Vissel Kobe	Buriram, Thailand
2024–25	League stage	2–1	(Australia) Central Coast Mariners	Gosford, Australia
2024–25	League stage	1–0	(South Korea) Pohang Steelers	Buriram, Thailand
2024–25	League stage	0–5	(Japan) Yokohama F. Marinos	Yokohama, Japan
2024–25	League stage	0–3	(Japan) Kawasaki Frontale	Buriram, Thailand
2024–25	League stage	0–0	(Malaysia) Johor Darul Ta'zim	Johor Bahru, Malaysia
2024–25	League stage	2–1	(South Korea) Ulsan HD	Buriram, Thailand
2024–25	League stage	2–2	(South Korea) Gwangju FC	Gwangju, South Korea
2024–25	Round of 16	0–0	(Malaysia) Johor Darul Ta'zim	Buriram, Thailand
2024–25	Round of 16	1–0	(Malaysia) Johor Darul Ta'zim	Johor Bahru, Malaysia
2024–25	Quarter-finals	0–3	(Saudi Arabia) Al-Ahli	Jeddah, Saudi Arabia
2025–26	League stage	2–1	(Malaysia) Johor Darul Ta'zim	Buriram, Thailand
2025–26	League stage	0–3	(South Korea) FC Seoul	Seoul, South Korea
2025–26	League stage	1–2	(Australia) Melbourne City	Melbourne, Australia
2025–26	League stage	2–0	(China) Shanghai Port	Buriram, Thailand
2025–26	League stage	0–0	(South Korea) Ulsan HD	Ulsan, South Korea
2025–26	League stage	2–2	(South Korea) Gangwon FC	Buriram, Thailand
2025–26	League stage	1–0	(China) Chengdu Rongcheng	Chengdu, China
2025–26	League stage	2–0	(China) Shanghai Shenhua	Buriram, Thailand
2025–26	Round of 16	1–1	(Australia) Melbourne City	Melbourne, Australia
2025–26	Round of 16	0–0 (a.e.t.) (4–2 p)	(Australia) Melbourne City	Buriram, Thailand
2025–26	Quarter-finals	2–3 (a.e.t.)	(United Arab Emirates) Shabab Al Ahli	Jeddah, Saudi Arabia

==== Chiangrai United ====
Chiangrai United results
Season	Round	Result	Opponent	Venue
2018	Preliminary round 2	2–1 (a.e.t.)	(Indonesia) Bali United	Chiang Rai, Thailand
2018	Play-off round	0–1	(China) Shanghai SIPG	Shanghai, China
2019	Preliminary round 2	3–1	(Myanmar) Yangon United	Chiang Rai, Thailand
2019	Play-off round	0–0 (a.e.t.) (4–3 p)	(Japan) Sanfrecce Hiroshima	Hiroshima, Japan
2020	Group stage	0–1	(Australia) Melbourne Victory	Melbourne, Australia
2020	Group stage	0–1	(China) Beijing Guoan	Chiang Rai, Thailand
2020	Group stage	0–5	(South Korea) FC Seoul	Doha, Qatar
2020	Group stage	2–1	(South Korea) FC Seoul	Doha, Qatar
2020	Group stage	2–2	(Australia) Melbourne Victory	Doha, Qatar
2020	Group stage	1–1	(China) Beijing Guoan	Doha, Qatar
2021	Group stage	1–2	(South Korea) Jeonbuk Hyundai Motors	Tashkent, Uzbekistan
2021	Group stage	1–0	(Singapore) Tampines Rovers	Tashkent, Uzbekistan
2021	Group stage	1–1	(Japan) Gamba Osaka	Tashkent, Uzbekistan
2021	Group stage	1–1	(Japan) Gamba Osaka	Tashkent, Uzbekistan
2021	Group stage	1–3	(South Korea) Jeonbuk Hyundai Motors	Tashkent, Uzbekistan
2021	Group stage	3–0	(Singapore) Tampines Rovers	Tashkent, Uzbekistan
2022	Group stage	0–1	(Hong Kong) Kitchee	Buriram, Thailand
2022	Group stage	0–6	(Japan) Vissel Kobe	Buriram, Thailand
2022	Group stage	0–0	(Japan) Vissel Kobe	Buriram, Thailand
2022	Group stage	2–3	(Hong Kong) Kitchee	Buriram, Thailand

==== Chonburi ====
Chonburi results
Season	Round	Result	Opponent	Venue
2008	Group stage	1–1	(Japan) Gamba Osaka	Suita, Japan
2008	Group stage	3–1	(Australia) Melbourne Victory	Bangkok, Thailand
2008	Group stage	0–1	(South Korea) Chunnam Dragons	Gwangyang, South Korea
2008	Group stage	2–2	(South Korea) Chunnam Dragons	Bangkok, Thailand
2008	Group stage	0–2	(Japan) Gamba Osaka	Bangkok, Thailand
2008	Group stage	1–3	(Australia) Melbourne Victory	Melbourne, Australia
2012	Play-off round	0–2	(South Korea) Pohang Steelers	Pohang, South Korea
2014	Play-off round 2	3–0	(Hong Kong) South China	Chonburi, Thailand
2014	Play-off round 3	0–2	(China) Beijing Guoan	Beijing, China
2015	Preliminary round 2	4–1	(Hong Kong) Kitchee	Chonburi, Thailand
2015	Play-off round	2–3 (a.e.t.)	(Japan) Kashiwa Reysol	Kashiwa, Japan
2016	Preliminary round 2	3–2 (a.e.t.)	(Myanmar) Yangon United	Chonburi, Thailand
2016	Play-off round	0–9	(Japan) FC Tokyo	Tokyo, Japan

==== Krung Thai Bank ====
Team	GP	W	D	L	F	A	GD	PTS
Krung Thai Bank	18	7	2	9	33	47	−14	23

Results

Season	Round	Team 1	Score	Team 2	Venue
2004	Group Stage	(Thailand) Krung Thai Bank	0–2	(China) Dalian Shide	Thai-Japanese Stadium, Bangkok, Thailand
2004	Group Stage	(Indonesia) PSM Makassar	2–3	(Thailand) Krung Thai Bank	Mattoangin Stadium, Makassar, Indonesia
2004	Group Stage	(Vietnam) Hoàng Anh Gia Lai	0–1	(Thailand) Krung Thai Bank	Pleiku Stadium, Pleiku, Vietnam
2004	Group Stage	(Thailand) Krung Thai Bank	2–2	(Vietnam) Hoàng Anh Gia Lai	Suphachalasai Stadium, Bangkok, Thailand
2004	Group Stage	(China) Dalian Shide	3–1	(Thailand) Krung Thai Bank	Dalian People's Stadium, Dalian, China
2004	Group Stage	(Thailand) Krung Thai Bank	1–2	(Indonesia) PSM Makassar	Thai-Japanese Stadium, Bangkok, Thailand
2005	Group Stage	(Indonesia) Persebaya Surabaya	1–2	(Thailand) Krung Thai Bank	Gelora 10 November Stadium, Surabaya, Indonesia
2005	Group Stage	(Thailand) Krung Thai Bank	0–2	(South Korea) Busan I'Park	Thammasat Stadium, Pathum Thani, Thailand
2005	Group Stage	(Vietnam) Pisico Bình Đinh	1–2	(Thailand) Krung Thai Bank	Quy Nhơn Stadium, Quy Nhơn, Vietnam
2005	Group Stage	(Thailand) Krung Thai Bank	0–1	(Vietnam) Pisico Bình Đinh	Thupatemi Stadium, Bangkok, Thailand
2005	Group Stage	(Thailand) Krung Thai Bank	1–0	(Indonesia) Persebaya Surabaya	Thupatemi Stadium, Bangkok, Thailand
2005	Group Stage	(South Korea) Busan I'Park	4–0	(Thailand) Krung Thai Bank	Busan Asiad Stadium, Busan, South Korea
2008	Group Stage	(Thailand) Krung Thai Bank	1–9	(Japan) Kashima Antlers	Chulalongkorn University Sports Stadium, Bangkok, Thailand
2008	Group Stage	(China) Beijing Guoan	4–2	(Thailand) Krung Thai Bank	Beijing Fengtai Stadium, Beijing, China
2008	Group Stage	(Thailand) Krung Thai Bank	9–1	(Vietnam) Nam Định	Chulalongkorn University Sports Stadium, Bangkok, Thailand
2008	Group Stage	(Vietnam) Nam Định	2–2	(Thailand) Krung Thai Bank	Mỹ Đình National Stadium, Hanoi, Vietnam
2008	Group Stage	(Japan) Kashima Antlers	8–1	(Thailand) Krung Thai Bank	Kashima Soccer Stadium, Kashima, Japan
2008	Group Stage	(Thailand) Krung Thai Bank	5–3	(China) Beijing Guoan	Rajamangala Stadium, Bangkok, Thailand

==== Osotsapa ====
Team	GP	W	D	L	F	A	GD	PTS
Osotsapa	7	2	2	3	9	24	−15	8

Results

Season	Round	Home team	Score	Away team	Venue
2002–03	Qualifying R2	(Indonesia) Persita Tangerang	0–1	(Thailand) Osotsapa	N/A
2002–03	Qualifying R2	(Thailand) Osotsapa	0–0	(Indonesia) Persita Tangerang	N/A
2002–03	Qualifying R3	(India) Churchill Brothers	1–1	(Thailand) Osotsapa	N/A
2002–03	Qualifying R3	(Thailand) Osotsapa	6–3	(India) Churchill Brothers	N/A
2002–03	Group Stage	(Thailand) Osotsapa	0–6	(South Korea) Seongnam Ilhwa Chunma	Dalian People's Stadium, Dalian, China
2002–03	Group Stage	(Thailand) Osotsapa	1–7	(China) Dalian Shide	Dalian People's Stadium, Dalian, China
2002–03	Group Stage	(Thailand) Osotsapa	0–7	(Japan) Shimizu S-Pulse	Dalian People's Stadium, Dalian, China

==== Muangthong United ====
Muangthong United results
Season	Round	Result	Opponent	Venue
2010	Play-off round	3–0	(Vietnam) SHB Đà Nẵng	Da Nang, Vietnam
2010	Play-off round	0–0 (a.e.t.) (3–4 p)	Singapore Armed Forces	Kallang, Singapore
2011	Play-off round	2–2 (a.e.t.) (6–7 p)	(Indonesia) Sriwijaya	Palembang, Indonesia
2013	Group stage	2–2	(South Korea) Jeonbuk Hyundai Motors	Nonthaburi, Thailand
2013	Group stage	1–4	(Japan) Urawa Red Diamonds	Saitama, Japan
2013	Group stage	0–4	(China) Guangzhou Evergrande	Guangzhou, China
2013	Group stage	1–4	(China) Guangzhou Evergrande	Nonthaburi, Thailand
2013	Group stage	0–2	(South Korea) Jeonbuk Hyundai Motors	Jeonju, South Korea
2013	Group stage	0–1	(Japan) Urawa Red Diamonds	Nonthaburi, Thailand
2014	Play-off round 2	2–0	(Vietnam) Hanoi T&T	Nonthaburi, Thailand
2014	Play-off round 3	1–2	(Australia) Melbourne Victory	Melbourne, Australia
2016	Preliminary round 2	0–0 (a.e.t.) (3–0 p)	(Malaysia) Johor Darul Ta'zim	Nonthaburi, Thailand
2016	Play-off round	0–3	(China) Shanghai SIPG	Shanghai, China
2017	Group stage	0–0	(Australia) Brisbane Roar	Brisbane, Australia
2017	Group stage	2–1	(Japan) Kashima Antlers	Bangkok, Thailand
2017	Group stage	0–0	(South Korea) Ulsan Hyundai	Ulsan, South Korea
2017	Group stage	1–0	(South Korea) Ulsan Hyundai	Nonthaburi, Thailand
2017	Group stage	3–0	(Australia) Brisbane Roar	Nonthaburi, Thailand
2017	Group stage	1–2	(Japan) Kashima Antlers	Kashima, Japan
2017	Round of 16	1–3	(Japan) Kawasaki Frontale	Nonthaburi, Thailand
2017	Round of 16	1–4	(Japan) Kawasaki Frontale	Kawasaki, Japan
2018	Preliminary round 2	5–2	(Malaysia) Johor Darul Ta'zim	Bangkok, Thailand
2018	Play-off round	0–3	(Japan) Kashiwa Reysol	Kashiwa, Japan

==== Police Tero ====
Team	GP	W	D	L	F	A	GD	PTS
Police Tero	19	5	2	12	19	35	−16	17

Results

Season	Round	Team 1	Score	Team 2	Venue
2002–03	Group Stage	(Thailand) BEC Tero Sasana	2–2	(Japan) Kashima Antlers	Suphachalasai Stadium, Bangkok, Thailand
2002–03	Group Stage	(Thailand) BEC Tero Sasana	2–0	(South Korea) Daejeon Citizen	Suphachalasai Stadium, Bangkok, Thailand
2002–03	Group Stage	(Thailand) BEC Tero Sasana	2–1	(China) Shanghai Shenhua	Suphachalasai Stadium, Bangkok, Thailand
2002–03	Semi-Final	(Thailand) BEC Tero Sasana	3–1	(Uzbekistan) Pakhtakor	Suphachalasai Stadium, Bangkok, Thailand
2002–03	Semi-Final	(Uzbekistan) Pakhtakor	1–0	(Thailand) BEC Tero Sasana	Pakhtakor Stadium, Tashkent, Uzbekistan
2002–03	Final	(United Arab Emirates) Al-Ain	2–0	(Thailand) BEC Tero Sasana	Tahnoun Bin Mohamed Stadium, Al Ain, UAE
2002–03	Final	(Thailand) BEC Tero Sasana	1–0	(United Arab Emirates) Al-Ain	Rajamangala Stadium, Bangkok, Thailand
2004	Group Stage	(South Korea) Jeonbuk Hyundai Motors	4–0	(Thailand) BEC Tero Sasana	Jeonju World Cup Stadium, Jeonju, South Korea
2004	Group Stage	(Japan) Júbilo Iwata	3–0	(Thailand) BEC Tero Sasana	Yamaha Stadium, Iwata, Japan
2004	Group Stage	(Thailand) BEC Tero Sasana	4–1	(China) Shanghai Shenhua	Thai-Japanese Stadium, Bangkok, Thailand
2004	Group Stage	(Thailand) BEC Tero Sasana	0–4	(South Korea) Jeonbuk Hyundai Motors	Suphachalasai Stadium, Bangkok, Thailand
2004	Group Stage	(China) Shanghai Shenhua	1–0	(Thailand) BEC Tero Sasana	Shanghai Stadium, Shanghai, China
2004	Group Stage	(Thailand) BEC Tero Sasana	2–3	(Japan) Júbilo Iwata	Thai-Japanese Stadium, Bangkok, Thailand
2005	Group Stage	(Thailand) BEC Tero Sasana	0–1	(Indonesia) PSM Makassar	Rajamangala Stadium, Bangkok, Thailand
2005	Group Stage	(China) Shandong Luneng	1–0	(Thailand) BEC Tero Sasana	Shandong Provincial Stadium, Jinan, China
2005	Group Stage	(Thailand) BEC Tero Sasana	1–2	(Japan) Yokohama F. Marinos	Thupatemi Stadium, Bangkok, Thailand
2005	Group Stage	(Japan) Yokohama F. Marinos	2–0	(Thailand) BEC Tero Sasana	Mitsuzawa Stadium, Yokohama, Japan
2005	Group Stage	(Indonesia) PSM Makassar	2–2	(Thailand) BEC Tero Sasana	Mattoangin Stadium, Makassar, Indonesia
2005	Group Stage	(Thailand) BEC Tero Sasana	0–4	(China) Shandong Luneng	Thupatemi Stadium, Bangkok, Thailand

==== Port ====
Port results
Season	Round	Result	Opponent	Venue
2020	Preliminary round 2	0–1	(Philippines) Ceres–Negros	Bangkok, Thailand
2021	Group stage	0–2	(Hong Kong) Kitchee	Buriram, Thailand
2021	Group stage	3–0	(China) Guangzhou	Buriram, Thailand
2021	Group stage	1–1	(Japan) Cerezo Osaka	Buriram, Thailand
2021	Group stage	0–3	(Japan) Cerezo Osaka	Buriram, Thailand
2021	Group stage	1–1	(Hong Kong) Kitchee	Buriram, Thailand
2021	Group stage	5–1	(China) Guangzhou	Buriram, Thailand
2022	Play-off round	0–3	(South Korea) Ulsan Hyundai	Ulsan, South Korea
2023–24	Play-off round	0–1	(China) Zhejiang	Huzhou, China

==== Ratchaburi ====
Port results
Season	Round	Result	Opponent	Venue
2021	Group stage	0–2	(South Korea) Pohang Steelers	Bangkok, Thailand
2021	Group stage	0–1	(Malaysia) Johor Darul Ta'zim	Bangkok, Thailand
2021	Group stage	0–4	(Japan) Nagoya Grampus	Bangkok, Thailand
2021	Group stage	0–3	(Japan) Nagoya Grampus	Bangkok, Thailand
2021	Group stage	0–0	(South Korea) Pohang Steelers	Bangkok, Thailand
2021	Group stage	0–0	(Malaysia) Johor Darul Ta'zim	Bangkok, Thailand

==== Sukhothai ====
Team	GP	W	D	L	F	A	GD	PTS
Sukhothai	2	1	0	1	5	3	+2	3

Results

Season	Round	Team 1	Score	Team 2	Venue
2017	Qualifying R2	(Thailand) Sukhothai	5–0	(Myanmar) Yadanarbon	Thung Thalay Luang Stadium, Sukhothai, Thailand
2017	Play-off	(China) Shanghai SIPG	3–0	(Thailand) Sukhothai	Shanghai Stadium, Shanghai, China

== Thai clubs in Asian Club Championship (1967–2002) ==
Seven clubs represented Thailand at various times in the AFC Asian Club Championship, a football competition which took place each year 1967–71 and 1985–2002. The most successful Thai club was Bangkok Bank F.C., which qualified nine times.

=== Participation ===
A total of seven clubs represented Thailand in the AFC Asian Club Championship, which became defunct in 2002.

Team	Qualified	Seasons
Bangkok Bank	9 Times	1967, 1969, 1971, 1985–86, 1987–88, 1990–91, 1994–95, 1995–96, 1997–98
Thai Farmers Bank	5 Times	1992–93, 1993–94 (W), 1994–95 (W), 1995–96, 1996–97
BEC Tero Sasana	2 Times	1998–99, 2001–02
Port Authority of Thailand	2 Times	1986–87, 1991–92
Royal Thai Air Force	2 Times	1988–89, 2000–01
Royal Thai Police	1 Time	1970
Sinthana	1 Time	1999–2000

W : Winner

=== Club statistics ===
==== Bangkok Bank ====
Team	GP	W	D	L	F	A	GD	PTS
Bangkok Bank	33	14	6	13	49	45	4	48

===== Results =====
Season	Team 1	Score	Team 2
1967	(Thailand) Bangkok Bank	0–1	(Hong Kong) South China
1967	(Thailand) Bangkok Bank	2–0	(Hong Kong) South China
1967	(Thailand) Bangkok Bank	0–1	(Malaysia) Selangor FA
1967	(Thailand) Bangkok Bank	0–0	(Malaysia) Selangor FA
1969	(Thailand) Bangkok Bank	1–1	(South Vietnam) Vietnam Police
1969	(Thailand) Bangkok Bank	1–1	(India) Mysore State
1969	(Thailand) Bangkok Bank	0–1	(South Korea) Yangzee FC
1969	(Thailand) Bangkok Bank	4–0	(Philippines) Manila Lions
1971	(Thailand) Bangkok Bank	2–0	(India) FC Punjab Police
1971	(Thailand) Bangkok Bank	0–2	(Iraq) Al-Shorta
1971	(Thailand) Bangkok Bank	1–4	(Israel) Maccabi Tel Aviv
1985–86	(Thailand) Bangkok Bank	2–0	(Singapore) Tiong Bahru CSC
1985–86	(Thailand) Bangkok Bank	1–1	(Indonesia) Tiga Berlian
1985–86	(Thailand) Bangkok Bank	5–1	(Malaysia) Malacca FA
1985–86	(Thailand) Bangkok Bank	2–0	(Brunei) ADP FC
1985–86	(Thailand) Bangkok Bank	1–0	(Indonesia) Tiga Berlian
1985–86	(Thailand) Bangkok Bank	1–0	(Indonesia) Tiga Berlian
1985–86	(Thailand) Bangkok Bank	1–3	(South Korea) Daewoo Royals
1985–86	(Thailand) Bangkok Bank	0–3	(Syria) Al-Ittihad
1987–88	(Thailand) Bangkok Bank	0–0	(Sri Lanka) Air Force SC
1987–88	(Thailand) Bangkok Bank	7–0	(Maldives) Victory SC
1987–88	(Thailand) Bangkok Bank	0–4	(Saudi Arabia) Al-Hilal
1987–88	(Thailand) Bangkok Bank	1–6	(Iraq) Al Rasheed
1990–91	(Thailand) Bangkok Bank	1–2	(Indonesia) Pelita Jaya Jakarta
1990–91	(Thailand) Bangkok Bank	2–1	(Singapore) Geylang International
1994–95	(Thailand) Bangkok Bank	4–3	(Maldives) Club Valencia
1994–95	(Thailand) Bangkok Bank	5–2	(Maldives) Club Valencia
1994–95	(Thailand) Bangkok Bank	1–4	(China) Liaoning FC
1994–95	(Thailand) Bangkok Bank	1–0	(China) Liaoning FC
1995–96	(Thailand) Bangkok Bank	0–2	(Indonesia) Persib Bandung
1995–96	(Thailand) Bangkok Bank	1–0	(Indonesia) Persib Bandung
1997–98	(Thailand) Bangkok Bank	2–4	(China) Dalian Wanda
1997–98	(Thailand) Bangkok Bank	0–0	(China) Dalian Wanda

==== BEC Tero Sasana ====
Team	GP	W	D	L	F	A	GD	PTS
BEC Tero Sasana	7	5	0	2	16	8	8	15

===== Results =====
Season	Team 1	Score	Team 2
1998–99	(Thailand) BEC Tero Sasana	6–1	(Nepal) Three Star Club
1998–99	(Thailand) BEC Tero Sasana	0–3	(China) Dalian Wanda
1998–99	(Thailand) BEC Tero Sasana	1–0	(China) Dalian Wanda
2001–02	(Thailand) BEC Tero Sasana	3–0	Singapore Armed Forces
2001–02	(Thailand) BEC Tero Sasana	5–1	Singapore Armed Forces
2001–02	(Thailand) BEC Tero Sasana	0–3	(Japan) Kashima Antlers
2001–02	(Thailand) BEC Tero Sasana	1–0	(Japan) Kashima Antlers

==== Royal Thai Police ====
Team	GP	W	D	L	F	A	GD	PTS
Royal Thai Police	3	0	0	3	1	11	−10	0

===== Results =====
Season	Team 1	Score	Team 2
1970	(Thailand) Royal Thai Police	0–5	(Israel) Hapoel Tel Aviv
1970	(Thailand) Royal Thai Police	0–4	(Indonesia) PSMS Medan
1970	(Thailand) Royal Thai Police	1–2	(India) West Bengal

==== Port Authority of Thailand ====
Team	GP	W	D	L	F	A	GD	PTS
PAT FC	5	1	0	4	6	9	−3	3

===== Results =====
Season	Team 1	Score	Team 2
1986–87	Port Authority of Thailand	0–1	(Malaysia) Selangor FA
1986–87	Port Authority of Thailand	0–1	(Malaysia) Selangor FA
1991–92	Port Authority of Thailand	1–3	(Qatar) Al Rayyan
1991–92	Port Authority of Thailand	4–1	(Bangladesh) Mohammedan SC
1991–92	Port Authority of Thailand	1–3	(United Arab Emirates) Al Shabab

==== Royal Thai Air Force ====
Team	GP	W	D	L	F	A	GD	PTS
Royal Thai Air Force	6	4	0	2	23	13	10	12

===== Results =====
Season	Team 1	Score	Team 2	Ref.
1988–89	(Thailand) Royal Thai Air Force	2–1	(Malaysia) Pahang FA	
1988–89	(Thailand) Royal Thai Air Force	9–0	(Singapore) Geylang International	
1988–89	(Thailand) Royal Thai Air Force	2–1	(Indonesia) NIAC Mitra	
1988–89	(Thailand) Royal Thai Air Force	9–0	(Brunei) Bandaran	
2000–01	(Thailand) Royal Thai Air Force	1–6	(Indonesia) PSM Makassar	
2000–01	(Thailand) Royal Thai Air Force	0–5	(Indonesia) PSM Makassar	

==== Sinthana ====
Team	GP	W	D	L	F	A	GD	PTS
Sinthana	7	3	1	3	12	12	0	10

===== Results =====
Season	Team 1	Score	Team 2
1999–2000	(Thailand) Sinthana	2–0	(Macau) GD Lam Pak
1999–2000	(Thailand) Sinthana	7–1	(Macau) GD Lam Pak
1999–2000	(Thailand) Sinthana	1–1	Singapore Armed Forces
1999–2000	(Thailand) Sinthana	2–1	Singapore Armed Forces
1999–2000	(Thailand) Sinthana	0–2	(Japan) Júbilo Iwata
1999–2000	(Thailand) Sinthana	0–4	(South Korea) Suwon Samsung Bluewings
1999–2000	(Thailand) Sinthana	0–3	(Japan) Kashima Antlers

==== Thai Farmers Bank ====
Team	GP	W	D	L	F	A	GD	PTS
Thai Farmers Bank	18	8	7	3	32	17	15	31

===== Results =====
Season	Team 1	Score	Team 2
1992–93	(Thailand) Thai Farmers Bank	2–0	(Indonesia) Arseto (Solo)
1992–93	(Thailand) Thai Farmers Bank	0–3	(Indonesia) Arseto (Solo)
1993–94	(Thailand) Thai Farmers Bank	2–2	(Indonesia) Arema Malang
1993–94	(Thailand) Thai Farmers Bank	4–1	(Indonesia) Arema Malang
1993–94	(Thailand) Thai Farmers Bank	1–1	(China) Liaoning FC
1993–94	(Thailand) Thai Farmers Bank	2–2	(Bahrain) Muharraq Club
1993–94	(Thailand) Thai Farmers Bank	1–1	(Japan) Verdy Kawasaki
1993–94	(Thailand) Thai Farmers Bank	2–1	Oman Club
1994–95	(Thailand) Thai Farmers Bank	4–0	(India) Mohun Bagan
1994–95	(Thailand) Thai Farmers Bank	2–0	(China) Liaoning FC
1994–95	(Thailand) Thai Farmers Bank	1–2	(Japan) Verdy Kawasaki
1994–95	(Thailand) Thai Farmers Bank	0–1	(South Korea) Ilhwa Chunma
1994–95	(Thailand) Thai Farmers Bank	2–2	(Uzbekistan) FK Neftchy Farg'ona
1994–95	(Thailand) Thai Farmers Bank	1–0	(Qatar) Al-Arabi
1995–96	(Thailand) Thai Farmers Bank	6–0	(Maldives) Club Valencia
1995–96	(Thailand) Thai Farmers Bank	1–0	(Maldives) Club Valencia
1995–96	(Thailand) Thai Farmers Bank	1–1	(South Korea) Ilhwa Chunma
1995–96	(Thailand) Thai Farmers Bank	0–0	(Japan) Verdy Kawasaki
1996–97	(Thailand) Thai Farmers Bank	1–3	(South Korea) Pohang Steelers
1996–97	(Thailand) Thai Farmers Bank	0–2	(South Korea) Pohang Steelers

=== Overall statistics ===
==== By club ====
No	Team	GP	W	D	L	F	A	GD	PTS
1	Bangkok Bank	33	14	6	13	49	45	4	48
2	Thai Farmers Bank	18	8	7	3	32	17	15	31
3	BEC Tero Sasana	7	5	0	2	16	8	8	15
4	Royal Thai Air Force	6	4	0	2	22	13	10	12
5	Sinthana	7	3	1	3	12	12	0	10
6	Port Authority of Thailand	5	1	0	4	6	9	−3	3
7	Royal Thai Police	3	0	0	3	1	11	−10	0

== Thai clubs in AFC Cup / AFC Champions League Two ==
Thai clubs history of playing in the AFC Cup / AFC Champions League Two. Osotsapa were the first side to take part since the competition started in 2004. After the revamping of the Champions League in 2009, Thai clubs once again entered. Since 2013, Thailand was given a direct spot in the AFC Champions League group stage and could not participate in the AFC Cup.

=== Participations ===
- QS: Qualifying Stage, GS: Group Stage, R16: Round of 16, QF: Quarterfinals, SF: Semifinals, RU: Runners-Up, W: Winners

The table that follows is accurate as of the end of the 2025–26 season.

Team	Qualified	2004	2005	2006	2007	2008	2009	2010	2011	2012	2024–25	2025–26
(Thailand) Chonburi	3 Times						QF		QF	SF^{1}		
(Thailand) Muangthong United	3 Times							SF^{1}	QF^{1}		R16	
(Thailand) Port	2 Times							QF			R16	
(Thailand) Bangkok United	2 Times										R16^{1}	SF^{1}
(Thailand) BG Pathum United	1 Time											GS
(Thailand) Ratchaburi	1 Time											QF
(Thailand) Osotsapa	1 Time				GS							
(Thailand) PEA	1 Time						GS					

^{1} Eliminated from AFC Champions League qualifying stage

Match won	Match drawn	Match lost

=== Statistics by club ===
==== Bangkok United ====
Bangkok United results
Season	Round	Result	Opponent	Venue
2024–25	Group Stage	4–2	(Singapore) Tampines Rovers	Pathum Thani, Thailand
2024–25	Group Stage	0–0	(Vietnam) Thép Xanh Nam Định	Nam Định, Vietnam
2024–25	Group Stage	1–0	(Hong Kong) Lee Man	Kowloon, Hong Kong
2024–25	Group Stage	4–1	(Hong Kong) Lee Man	Pathum Thani, Thailand
2024–25	Group Stage	0–1	(Singapore) Tampines Rovers	Kallang, Singapore
2024–25	Group Stage	3–2	(Vietnam) Thép Xanh Nam Định	Pathum Thani, Thailand
2024–25	Round of 16	2–2	(Australia) Sydney FC	Sydney, Australia
2024–25	Round of 16	2–3 (a.e.t.)	(Australia) Sydney FC	Pathum Thani, Thailand
2025–26	Group Stage	4–2	(Malaysia) Selangor	Petaling Jaya, Malaysia
2025–26	Group Stage	0–2	(Indonesia) Persib Bandung	Pathum Thani, Thailand
2025–26	Group Stage	1–0	(Singapore) Lion City Sailors	Pathum Thani, Thailand
2025–26	Group Stage	2–1	(Singapore) Lion City Sailors	Bishan, Singapore
2025–26	Group Stage	1–1	(Malaysia) Selangor	Pathum Thani, Thailand
2025–26	Group Stage	0–1	(Indonesia) Persib Bandung	Bandung, Indonesia
2025–26	Round of 16	2–0	(Australia) Macarthur FC	Pathum Thani, Thailand
2025–26	Round of 16	2–2	(Australia) Macarthur FC	Sydney, Australia
2025–26	Quarter-finals	2–1	(Singapore) Tampines Rovers	Pathum Thani, Thailand
2025–26	Quarter-finals	2–2	(Singapore) Tampines Rovers	Kallang, Singapore
2025–26	Semi-finals	1–0	(Japan) Gamba Osaka	Suita, Japan
2025–26	Semi-finals	0–3	(Japan) Gamba Osaka	Bangkok, Thailand

==== BG Pathum United ====
BG Pathum United results
Season	Round	Result	Opponent	Venue
2025–26	Group Stage	0–1	(South Korea) Pohang Steelers	Pathum Thani, Thailand
2025–26	Group Stage	1–2	(Singapore) Tampines Rovers	Bishan, Singapore
2025–26	Group Stage	2–0	(Philippines) Kaya–Iloilo	Capas, Philippines
2025–26	Group Stage	2–1	(Philippines) Kaya–Iloilo	Pathum Thani, Thailand
2025–26	Group Stage	0–2	(South Korea) Pohang Steelers	Pohang, South Korea
2025–26	Group Stage	0–2	(Singapore) Tampines Rovers	Pathum Thani, Thailand

==== Chonburi ====
Chonburi results
Season	Round	Result	Opponent	Venue
2009	Group Stage	4–1	(Hong Kong) Eastern	Bangkok, Thailand
2009	Group Stage	1–0	(Malaysia) Kedah	Kedah, Malaysia
2009	Group Stage	2–0	(Vietnam) Hà Nội ACB	Hanoi, Vietnam
2009	Group Stage	6–0	(Vietnam) Hà Nội ACB	Bangkok, Thailand
2009	Group Stage	1–2	(Hong Kong) Eastern	Mong Kok, Hong Kong
2009	Group Stage	3–1	(Malaysia) Kedah	Bangkok, Thailand
2009	Round of 16	4–0	(Indonesia) PSMS Medan	Bangkok, Thailand
2009	Quarter-finals	2–2	(Vietnam) Bình Dương	Bangkok, Thailand
2009	Quarter-finals	0–2	(Vietnam) Bình Dương	Thủ Dầu Một, Vietnam
2011	Group Stage	4–4	(India) East Bengal	Kolkata, India
2011	Group Stage	3–0	(Hong Kong) South China	Chonburi, Thailand
2011	Group Stage	0–3	(Indonesia) Persipura Jayapura	Jayapura, Indonesia
2011	Group Stage	4–1	(Indonesia) Persipura Jayapura	Chonburi, Thailand
2011	Group Stage	4–0	(India) East Bengal	Chonburi, Thailand
2011	Group Stage	3–0	(Hong Kong) South China	So Kon Po, Hong Kong
2011	Round of 16	3–0	(Indonesia) Sriwijaya	Chonburi, Thailand
2011	Quarter-finals	0–1	(Uzbekistan) Nasaf Qarshi	Chonburi, Thailand
2011	Quarter-finals	1–0	(Uzbekistan) Nasaf Qarshi	Qarshi, Uzbekistan
2012	Group Stage	1–1	(Myanmar) Yangon United	Yangon, Myanmar
2012	Group Stage	1–0	(Singapore) Home United	Chonburi, Thailand
2012	Group Stage	2–0	(Hong Kong) Citizen	Chonburi, Thailand
2012	Group Stage	3–3	(Hong Kong) Citizen	Mong Kok, Hong Kong
2012	Group Stage	1–0	(Myanmar) Yangon United	Chonburi, Thailand
2012	Group Stage	2–1	(Singapore) Home United	Bishan, Singapore
2012	Round of 16	1–0	(Iraq) Al-Zawraa	Chonburi, Thailand
2012	Quarter-finals	1–2	(Syria) Al-Shorta	Chonburi, Thailand
2012	Quarter-finals	4–2 (a.e.t.)	(Syria) Al-Shorta	Zarqa, Jordan
2012	Semi-finals	1–4	(Iraq) Erbil	Erbil, Iraq
2012	Semi-finals	1–4	(Iraq) Erbil	Chonburi, Thailand

==== Muangthong United ====
Team	GP	W	D	L	F	A	GD	PTS
Muangthong United	28	13	8	7	55	29	+26	47

===== Results =====
Season	Round	Team 1	Score	Team 2	Venue
2010	Group Stage	(Hong Kong) South China AA	0–0	(Thailand) Muangthong United	Hong Kong Stadium, So Kon Po, Hong Kong
2010	Group Stage	(Thailand) Muangthong United	3–1	(Maldives) VB Sports Club	Yamaha Stadium, Nonthaburi, Thailand
2010	Group Stage	(Thailand) Muangthong United	4–1	(Indonesia) Persiwa Wamena	Yamaha Stadium, Nonthaburi, Thailand
2010	Group Stage	(Maldives) VB Sports Club	2–3	(Thailand) Muangthong United	National Stadium, Malé, Maldives
2010	Group Stage	(Thailand) Muangthong United	0–1	(Hong Kong) South China AA	Surakul Stadium, Phuket, Thailand
2010	Group Stage	(Indonesia) Persiwa Wamena	2–2	(Thailand) Muangthong United	Gajayana Stadium, Malang, Indonesia
2010	Round of 16	(Qatar) Al-Rayyan	1–1 (a.e.t.) (2–4 p)	(Thailand) Muangthong United	Umm-Affai Stadium, Al-Rayyan, Qatar
2010	Quarter-finals	(Syria) Al-Karamah	1–0	(Thailand) Muangthong United	Khaled bin Walid Stadium, Homs, Syria
2010	Quarter-finals	(Thailand) Muangthong United	2–0	(Syria) Al-Karamah	Yamaha Stadium, Nonthaburi, Thailand
2010	Semi-finals	(Thailand) Muangthong United	1–0	(Syria) Al-Ittihad	Yamaha Stadium, Nonthaburi, Thailand
2010	Semi-finals	(Syria) Al-Ittihad	2–0	(Thailand) Muangthong United	Aleppo International Stadium, Aleppo, Syria
2011	Group Stage	(Thailand) Muangthong United	4–0	(Vietnam) Hanoi T&T	SCG Stadium, Nonthaburi, Thailand
2011	Group Stage	(Singapore) Tampines Rovers	1–1	(Thailand) Muangthong United	Jalan Besar Stadium, Kallang, Singapore
2011	Group Stage	(Thailand) Muangthong United	1–0	(Maldives) Victory SC	SCG Stadium, Nonthaburi, Thailand
2011	Group Stage	(Maldives) Victory SC	0–4	(Thailand) Muangthong United	National Stadium, Malé, Maldives
2011	Group Stage	(Vietnam) Hanoi T&T	0–0	(Thailand) Muangthong United	Hàng Đẫy Stadium, Hanoi, Vietnam
2011	Group Stage	(Thailand) Muangthong United	4–0	(Singapore) Tampines Rovers	SCG Stadium, Nonthaburi, Thailand
2011	Round of 16	(Thailand) Muangthong United	4–0	(Lebanon) Al Ahed	SCG Stadium, Nonthaburi, Thailand
2011	Quarter-finals	Kuwait SC	1–0	(Thailand) Muangthong United	Al Kuwait Sports Club Stadium, Kuwait City, Kuwait
2011	Quarter-finals	(Thailand) Muangthong United	0–0	Kuwait SC	SCG Stadium, Nonthaburi, Thailand
2024–25	Group Stage	(Thailand) Muangthong United	1–1	(Malaysia) Selangor	Rajamangala Stadium, Bangkok, Thailand
2024–25	Group Stage	(South Korea) Jeonbuk Hyundai Motors	4–1	(Thailand) Muangthong United	Jeonju World Cup Stadium, Jeonju, South Korea
2024–25	Group Stage	(Thailand) Muangthong United	2–2	(Philippines) DH Cebu	Rajamangala Stadium, Bangkok, Thailand
2024–25	Group Stage	(Philippines) DH Cebu	2–9	(Thailand) Muangthong United	Rizal Memorial Stadium, Manila, Philippine
2024–25	Group Stage	(Malaysia) Selangor	1–2	(Thailand) Muangthong United	MBPJ Stadium, Petaling Jaya, Malaysia
2024–25	Group Stage	(Thailand) Muangthong United	1–0	(South Korea) Jeonbuk Hyundai Motors	Rajamangala Stadium, Bangkok, Thailand
2024–25	Round of 16	(Thailand) Muangthong United	2–3	(Singapore) Lion City Sailors	Thunderdome Stadium, Nonthaburi, Thailand
2024–25	Round of 16	(Singapore) Lion City Sailors	4–0	(Thailand) Muangthong United	Jalan Besar Stadium, Kallang, Singapore

==== Osotsapa ====
Team	GP	W	D	L	F	A	GD	PTS
Osotsapa	6	3	1	2	12	3	+9	10

===== Results =====
Season	Round	Team 1	Score	Team 2	Venue
2007	Group Stage	(Thailand) Osotsapa	4–0	(Malaysia) Pahang	Royal Thai Army Stadium, Bangkok, Thailand
2007	Group Stage	(Singapore) Tampines Rovers	2–1	(Thailand) Osotsapa	Tampines Stadium, Tampines, Singapore
2007	Group Stage	(Thailand) Osotsapa	0–0	(India) Mohun Bagan	Royal Thai Army Stadium, Bangkok, Thailand
2007	Group Stage	(India) Mohun Bagan	1–0	(Thailand) Osotsapa	Salt Lake Stadium, Kolkata, India
2007	Group Stage	(Malaysia) Pahang	0–4	(Thailand) Osotsapa	Shah Alam Stadium, Shah Alam, Malaysia
2007	Group Stage	(Thailand) Osotsapa	3–0	(Singapore) Tampines Rovers	Royal Thai Army Stadium, Bangkok, Thailand

==== PEA ====
Team	GP	W	D	L	F	A	GD	PTS
PEA	6	3	1	2	12	10	+2	10

===== Results =====
Season	Round	Team 1	Score	Team 2	Venue
2009	Group Stage	(Maldives) Club Valencia	1–3	(Thailand) PEA	National Stadium, Malé, Maldives
2009	Group Stage	(Thailand) PEA	2–1	(Singapore) Home United	Suphachalasai Stadium, Bangkok, Thailand
2009	Group Stage	(Thailand) PEA	1–3	(Vietnam) Bình Dương	Suphachalasai Stadium, Bangkok, Thailand
2009	Group Stage	(Vietnam) Bình Dương	1–1	(Thailand) PEA	Gò Đậu Stadium, Thủ Dầu Một, Vietnam
2009	Group Stage	(Thailand) PEA	4–1	(Maldives) Club Valencia	Suphachalasai Stadium, Bangkok, Thailand
2009	Group Stage	(Singapore) Home United	3–1	(Thailand) PEA	Jalan Besar Stadium, Kallang, Singapore

==== Port ====
Team	GP	W	D	L	F	A	GD	PTS
Port	17	7	4	6	21	25	−4	25

===== Results =====
Season	Round	Team 1	Score	Team 2	Venue
2010	Group Stage	(Thailand) Thai Port	2–3	(Vietnam) SHB Đà Nẵng	Suphachalasai Stadium, Bangkok, Thailand
2010	Group Stage	(Hong Kong) NT Realty Wofoo Tai Po	0–1	(Thailand) Thai Port	Tseung Kwan O Sports Ground, Tseung Kwan O, Hong Kong
2010	Group Stage	(Thailand) Thai Port	2–2	(Singapore) Geylang United	Suphachalasai Stadium, Bangkok, Thailand
2010	Group Stage	(Singapore) Geylang United	0–1	(Thailand) Thai Port	Jalan Besar Stadium, Kallang, Singapore
2010	Group Stage	(Vietnam) SHB Đà Nẵng	0–0	(Thailand) Thai Port	Chi Lăng Stadium, Da Nang, Vietnam
2010	Group Stage	(Thailand) Thai Port	2–0	(Hong Kong) NT Realty Wofoo Tai Po	Surakul Stadium, Phuket, Thailand
2010	Round of 16	(Indonesia) Sriwijaya	1–4	(Thailand) Thai Port	Jakabaring Stadium, Palembang, Indonesia
2010	Quarter-finals	(Thailand) Thai Port	0–0	(Kuwait) Al-Qadsia	Suphachalasai Stadium, Bangkok, Thailand
2010	Quarter-finals	(Kuwait) Al-Qadsia	3–0	(Thailand) Thai Port	Mohammed Al-Hamad Stadium, Hawally, Kuwait
2024–25	Group Stage	(Indonesia) Persib Bandung	0–1	(Thailand) Port	Si Jalak Harupat Stadium, Bandung, Indonesia
2024–25	Group Stage	(Thailand) Port	1–0	(China) Zhejiang	Pathum Thani Stadium, Pathum Thani, Thailand
2024–25	Group Stage	(Thailand) Port	1–3	(Singapore) Lion City Sailors	Pathum Thani Stadium, Pathum Thani, Thailand
2024–25	Group Stage	(China) Zhejiang	1–2	(Thailand) Port	Huanglong Sports Center, Hangzhou, China
2024–25	Group Stage	(Thailand) Port	2–2	(Indonesia) Persib Bandung	Pathum Thani Stadium, Pathum Thani, Thailand
2024–25	Group Stage	(Singapore) Lion City Sailors	5–2	(Thailand) Port	Jalan Besar Stadium, Kallang, Singapore
2024–25	Round of 16	(Thailand) Port	0–4	(South Korea) Jeonbuk Hyundai Motors	Pathum Thani Stadium, Pathum Thani, Thailand
2024–25	Round of 16	(South Korea) Jeonbuk Hyundai Motors	1–0	(Thailand) Port	Jeonju World Cup Stadium, Jeonju, South Korea

==== Ratchaburi ====
Team	GP	W	D	L	F	A	GD	PTS
Ratchaburi	10	4	1	5	20	12	+8	13

===== Results =====
Season	Round	Team 1	Score	Team 2	Venue
2025–26	Group Stage	(Vietnam) Nam Dinh	3–1	(Thailand) Ratchaburi	Thiên Trường Stadium, Ninh Bình, Vietnam
2025–26	Group Stage	(Thailand) Ratchaburi	0–2	(Japan) Gamba Osaka	Ratchaburi Stadium, Ratchaburi, Thailand
2025–26	Group Stage	(Thailand) Ratchaburi	5–1	(Hong Kong) Eastern	Ratchaburi Stadium, Ratchaburi, Thailand
2025–26	Group Stage	(Hong Kong) Eastern	0–7	(Thailand) Ratchaburi	Mong Kok Stadium, Kowloon, Hong Kong
2025–26	Group Stage	(Thailand) Ratchaburi	2–0	(Vietnam) Nam Dinh	Ratchaburi Stadium, Ratchaburi, Thailand
2025–26	Group Stage	(Japan) Gamba Osaka	2–0	(Thailand) Ratchaburi	Suita City Football Stadium, Suita, Japan
2025–26	Round of 16	(Thailand) Ratchaburi	3–0	(Indonesia) Persib	Ratchaburi Stadium, Ratchaburi, Thailand
2025–26	Round of 16	(Indonesia) Persib	1–0	(Thailand) Ratchaburi	Gelora Bandung Lautan Api Stadium, Bandung, Indonesia
2025–26	Quarter-finals	(Japan) Gamba Osaka	1–1	(Thailand) Ratchaburi	Suita City Football Stadium, Suita, Japan
2025–26	Quarter-finals	(Thailand) Ratchaburi	1–2 (a.e.t.)	(Japan) Gamba Osaka	Ratchaburi Stadium, Ratchaburi, Thailand

== See also ==
- Thai football records and statistics
