= Trần Duy Long =

Vietnamese football manager and former footballer

Personal information
- Date of birth: 1941 (age 84–85)
- Place of birth: Mỹ Lộc, Nam Định, French Indochina
- Position: Midfielder

Senior career*
| Years | Team | Apps | (Gls) |
| ?–1960 | Công An Hải Phòng | | |
| 1960–1967 | Trường Huấn Luyện Thể Thao Trung Ương | | |

International career
| 1959–1967 | North Vietnam | | |

Managerial career
- 1973–1984: Tổng Cục Đường sắt
- 1977–1984: Vietnam
- 1994–1995: Vietnam (interim)
- 1997: Vietnam
- * Club domestic league appearances and goals

Trần Duy Long (born 1941) is a Vietnamese football manager and former footballer.

== Career ==
Born in Nam Định, Duy Long grew up in Haiphong. He began his career at Công An Hải Phòng before moving to Trường Huấn Luyện Thể Thao Trung Ương in 1960. In 1967, he retired after failing to recover from a knee injury. Later, he was sent to study in Soviet Union.

In 1973, Duy Long returned to Vietnam after graduating from the Kiev University on Physical Education and Sport and became the coach of Tổng Cục Đường sắt, contributing greatly to promoting the team from the Second Division to the First Division. In 1980, he moved to Ho Chi Minh City to work as a coach at the Professional Talent School and then worked at the Ho Chi Minh City Football Federation.

In 1994, he was appointed as the acting head coach of the Vietnam national football team. In 1995, he served as the assistant coach of the national team participating in the 1995 SEA Games, winning a silver medal. In 1996, also as the assistant coach, he and the national team won a bronze medal in the Tiger Cup.

In 1997, he was the head coach of the national team for the 1998 FIFA World Cup qualification in Asia, but was dismissed by the VFF after 5 consecutive losses. In 2008, he was elected as the President of the Ho Chi Minh City Football Federation (term 2008-2012), replacing Lê Hùng Dũng.
