= Lê Khắc Chính =

Vietnamese football manager and former footballer

Personal information
- Full name: Lê Khắc Chính
- Date of birth: 14 November 1956 (age 69)
- Place of birth: Hà Tây, North Vietnam
- Height: 1.74 m (5 ft 9 in)
- Position: Defender

Youth career
- 1968–1972: Tổng Cục Đường sắt

Senior career*
Years	Team	Apps	(Gls)
1973–1994	Tổng Cục Đường sắt	132	(14)

International career
1991–1993	Vietnam	3	(0)
- * Club domestic league appearances and goals

Lê Khắc Chính (born 14 November 1956) is a Vietnamese football manager and former footballer.

== Career ==
Khắc Chính played as a defender, spent his entire career playing for Tổng Cục Đường sắt. He capped 7 times for the Vietnam national football team between 1993 and 1994, and worked as a manager after retiring from professional football.

His son Lê Đức Tuấn was also a professional footballer.
