= Lions F.C. =

- Full name: Lions Football Club
- Nickname(s): The Lions
- Founded: 1949; 76 years ago
- League: UFL Division 2
Home colours	Away colours

The Lions Football Club was a football club based in Manila, Philippines.

== History ==
Lions F.C. was established on 7 December 1949 by football coach Mariano Ong.

In the 1950s, the Lions dominated other Filipino-Chinese football clubs such as Cheng Hua, Cheng Hong, Electrons, and South Star in local leagues and was composed mostly of players from the Mapua. The Lions won the Manila Football League seven times.

They participated in the Asian Champion Club Tournament (now known as the AFC Champions League Elite) held in Bangkok, Thailand, in 1969, where they finished last in Group A of the group stage.

== Honors ==
=== Domestic competitions ===
- Philippines National Championship
  - Winners (1): 1967
- Manila Football League
  - Winners (7): 1955, 1956, 1957, 1958, 1959, 1960, 1961
