= North Vietnam Football Championship =

Former league competition

North Vietnam National Class A League
- Organising body: Vietnam Football Association
- Founded: 1955
- Folded: 1975
- Replaced by: Hồng Hà League
- Country: North Vietnam
- Confederation: AFC
- Number of clubs: 16
- Level on pyramid: 1
- Relegation to: National Class B League
- Most championships: Thể Công (9 titles)

The Northern Vietnam Football Championship (Vietnamese: Giải vô địch bóng đá miền Bắc Việt Nam) or the National Class A League (Giải vô địch bóng đá hạng A) was the top level of association football in North Vietnam. It was founded in 1955 as the Hòa Bình League, and ended in 1975 with 20 seasons.

Thể Công was the most successful team in the league with 10 titles. Công Hải Phòng and Công An Hà Nội each won 3 titles.

After Vietnam's reunification in 1975, a unified Vietnamese football league was yet to be held due to logistical problems. As the result, three separate regional leagues were created, with the northern league named Hồng Hà League, the central named Trường Sơn League and the southern named Cửu Long League. Quân Đội won the 1976, 1977 and 1978 Hồng Hà League, and the last season in 1979 was won by Quân Khu Thủ Đô. In 1980, the National A1 Championship was established, with teams across all regions in the country included.

== Champions ==
| Year | Champion | Runner-up | Third place |
|---|---|---|---|
Hòa Bình League
| 1955 | Thể Công (1) | Hải Phòng | Unknown |
National Class A League
| 1956 | Thể Công (2) | Hoàng Diệu | Unknown |
| 1957 | Công An Hà Nội (1) | Thể Công | Unknown |
| 1958 | Thể Công (3) | Tổng Cục Đường Sắt | Unknown |
| 1959 | Tổng Cục Bưu Điện (1) | Tổng Cục Đường Sắt | Công An Hải Phòng |
| 1960 | Tổng Cục Đường Sắt (1) | Unknown | Unknown |
| 1961 | Công An Hải Phòng (1) | Thể Công | Tổng Cục Đường Sắt |
| 1962 | Công Nhân Hồng Quảng (1) | Unknown | Unknown |
| 1963 | Công An Hải Phòng (2) | Tổng Cục Đường Sắt | Công Nhân Hồng Quảng |
| 1964 | Công An Hà Nội (2) | Tổng Cục Đường Sắt | Unknown |
| 1965 | Trường Huấn Luyện Thể Thao Trung Uơng (1) | Unknown | Unknown |
| 1966 | Not organized due to American bombings in the country | | |
| 1967 | Trường Sĩ Quan Lục Quân (4) (Note: From 1965 to 1970, Thể Công competed under the name Trường Sĩ Quan Lục Quân.) | Công An Hải Phòng | Công An Hà Nội |
| 1968 | Công An Hải Phòng (3) | Trường Huấn Luyện Thể Thao Trung Uơng | Cảng Hải Phòng |
| 1969 | Công An Hà Nội (3) | Quân Khu 3 | Unknown |
| 1970 | Trường Huấn Luyện Thể Thao Trung Uơng (2) | Than Quảng Ninh | Unknown |
| 1971 | Thể Công (5) | Unknown | Unknown |
| 1972 | Thể Công (6) | Unknown | Unknown |
| 1973 | Thể Công (7) | Dệt A Nam Định | Unknown |
| 1974 | Thể Công (8) | Công An Hải Phòng | Xi Măng Hải Phòng |
| 1975 | Thể Công (9) | Tổng Cục Bưu Điện | Xi Măng Hải Phòng |
Hồng Hà League
| 1976 | Quân Đội (1) (Note: In 1976, Thể Công changed their name to Quân Đội) | Tổng Cục Đường Sắt | Unknown |
| 1977 | Quân Đội (2) | Unknown | Unknown |
| 1978 | Quân Đội (3) | Công An Hà Nội | Tổng Cục Đường Sắt |
| 1979 | Quân Khu Thủ Đô (1) | Quân Đội | Công An Hà Nội |
