= Hồ Thanh Chinh =

Vietnamese sprinter (born 1941)

Personal information
- Date of birth: 21 December 1941
- Place of birth: Saigon, French Indochina
- Date of death: 1 January 2021 (aged 79)
- Place of death: Hồ Chí Minh City, Vietnam
- Height: 1.72 m (5 ft 8 in)
- Position: Goalkeeper

Senior career*
Years	Team	Apps	(Gls)
1963–197?	Hải Quan		

International career
1966–1975	South Vietnam		
- * Club domestic league appearances and goals

Hồ Thanh Chinh
Personal information
- Nationality: Vietnamese

Sport
- Sport: Sprinting
- Event: 100 metres

Hồ Thanh Chinh (21 December 1941 – 1 January 2021) was a Vietnamese footballer and sprinter. He competed in the men's 100 metres at the 1964 Summer Olympics.

Chinh represented the South Vietnam national football team between 1966 and 1975, being part of the 1966 Merdeka Tournament winning team.
