= Đỗ Khải =

Vietnamese footballer (born 1974)

Personal information
- Full name: Đỗ Văn Khải
- Date of birth: 1 April 1974 (age 52)
- Place of birth: Saigon, South Vietnam
- Height: 1.74 m (5 ft 9 in)
- Position: Midfielder

Youth career
- 1985–1991: Hải Quan

Senior career*
Years	Team	Apps	(Gls)
1992–2001	Hải Quan	57	(9)

International career
1996–2000	Vietnam	19	(0)
- * Club domestic league appearances and goals

Đỗ Văn Khải (born 1 April 1974), commonly known as Đỗ Khải is a Vietnamese football former footballer who is last known to have played as a defender for Hải Quan.

== Career ==
Do Khai spent his entire playing career with Vietnamese side Hải Quan and was considered a solid defender for the Vietnam national football team.
