= Phitsanulok Songkwae F.C. =

Thai football club

Phitsanulok Songkwae พิษณุโลกสองแคว
- Full name: Phitsanulok Songkwae Football Club สโมสรฟุตบอลพิษณุโลกสองแคว
- Nickname(s): King Naresuan Warriors (ทหารเสือพระนเรศวร)
- Founded: 2017; 8 years ago
- League: Thailand Amateur League
Home colours	Away colours

Phitsanulok Songkwae Football Club (Thai สโมสรฟุตบอลพิษณุโลกสองแคว) is a Thailand semi professional football club based in Phitsanulok Province. They currently play in Thai Football Amateur Tournament.

== Record ==
Season	League									FA Cup	League Cup	Top goalscorer	
Season	Division	P	W	D	L	F	A	Pts	Pos	FA Cup	League Cup	Name	Goals
2017	TA North	1	0	1	0	0	0	1	13th - 21st	Not Enter	Can't Enter		
2018	TA North									Not Enter	Can't Enter		

Champions	Runners-up	Promoted	Relegated
