= Hai Quan FC =

Vietnamese football club

Hải Quan
- Full name: Ho Chi Minh City Customs Football Club
- Founded: 1954
- Dissolved: 2002
- Ground: Thống Nhất Stadium
- Capacity: 25,000

Ho Chi Minh City Customs Football Club (Vietnamese: Câu lạc bộ bóng đá Hải quan Thành phố Hồ Chí Minh), simply known as Hải Quan, was a Vietnamese association football club based in Ho Chi Minh City. They were champions in the 1991 season of the V.League, Vietnam's top-level football league.

Before 1975, the club was known as Quan Thuế and won three South Vietnam national titles.

During its existence, the club had a long-standing rivalry with Cảng Sài Gòn.

== Continental records ==
| Season | Competition | Round | Club | Home | Away | Aggregate |
|---|---|---|---|---|---|---|
| 1967 | Asian Champion Club Tournament | First round | (Malaysia) Selangor | 1–2 | 0–0 | 1–2 |
| 1992–93 | Asian Club Championship | First round | (Indonesia) Arseto Solo | 0–0 | 2–3 | 2–3 |
| 1997–98 | Asian Cup Winners' Cup | First round | (South Korea) Suwon Samsung Bluewings | 1–5 | 0–4 | 1–9 |
| 1998–99 | Asian Cup Winners' Cup | First round | (Malaysia) Sawarak | 1–2 | 1–3 | 2–5 |

== Honours ==
=== National competitions ===
League

- V.League:
  - Winners: 1991
  - Runners-up: 1982–83, 1986
  - Third place: 1980, 1990
- First Division:
  - Third place: 2000–01
- Second Division:
  - Winners: 1999–2000
- South Vietnam Division of Honour:
  - Winners: 1961–62, 1964–65, 1966–67
- Cửu Long League:
  - Winners: 1976

Cup

- National Cup:
  - Winners: 1996, 1997
  - Runners-up: 1998

== Notable players ==
- Đỗ Cẩu
- Đỗ Khải
- Đỗ Thới Vinh
- Hồ Thanh Chinh
- Lưu Tấn Liêm
- Phạm Văn Rạng
