= 1980 V-League =

Vietnam National A1 League
- Season: 1980
- Dates: 3 February – 1 May
- Champions: Tổng Cục Đường Sắt (1st title)
- Relegated: Tiền Giang; An Giang; Đồng Tháp
- Goals: 188
- Average goals/game: 2,26
- Top goalscorer: Lê Văn Đặng (10 goals)

The 1980 Vietnam National A1 League was the inaugural season of the National Football Championship in Vietnam.

Seventeen teams took part in the competition that was played in two stages: a Group stage featuring 3 groups of 6 and 5 teams and a Championship stage featuring the three group winners.

Originally there were 18 teams, with 8 from Hồng Hà League in the North, 2 from Trường Sơn League in the Central and 8 from Cửu Long League in the South. However, defending all-Vietnam champions Quân Đội withdrew due to internal reasons.

== Group stage ==
- Group stage winners advanced to the Championship stage.
- Bottom placed teams in each group automatically relegated.

=== Group A ===
| Pos | Team | Pld | W | D | L | GF | GA | GD | Pts | Qualification or relegation |
|---|---|---|---|---|---|---|---|---|---|---|
| 1 | Công An Hà Nội | 10 | 7 | 2 | 1 | 24 | 7 | +17 | 16 | Qualify for Championship stage |
| 2 | Quân Khu 3 | 10 | 6 | 3 | 1 | 15 | 7 | +8 | 15 | |
| 3 | Cảng Sài Gòn | 10 | 3 | 4 | 3 | 13 | 12 | +1 | 10 | |
| 4 | Công Nhân Nghĩa Bình | 10 | 2 | 5 | 3 | 11 | 16 | −5 | 9 | |
| 5 | Công Nghiệp Thực Phẩm | 10 | 3 | 2 | 5 | 16 | 14 | +2 | 8 | |
| 6 | Tiền Giang | 10 | 0 | 2 | 8 | 8 | 31 | −23 | 2 | Relegated |

Source: RSSSF

Result

| Home / Away | CÔN | QK3 | CSG | CNB | CTP | TGI |
|---|---|---|---|---|---|---|
| CAH | — | 0–0 | 4–0 | 3–0 | 1–0 | 4–2 |
| QK3 | 1–0 | — | 1–1 | 3–2 | 3–1 | 1–0 |
| CSG | 1–1 | 0–0 | — | 2–2 | 2–0 | 2–0 |
| CNB | 0–3 | 2–1 | 1–0 | — | 2–2 | 0–0 |
| CTP | 0–1 | 0–1 | 2–1 | 2–0 | — | 4–0 |
| TGI | 3–7 | 1–4 | 1–4 | 0–0 | 1–5 | — |

=== Group B ===
| Pos | Team | Pld | W | D | L | GF | GA | GD | Pts | Qualification or relegation |
|---|---|---|---|---|---|---|---|---|---|---|
| 1 | Tổng Cục Đường Sắt | 10 | 5 | 5 | 0 | 12 | 5 | +7 | 15 | Qualify for Championship stage |
| 2 | Phòng Không | 10 | 3 | 5 | 2 | 8 | 8 | 0 | 11 | |
| 3 | Sở CN TP.HCM | 10 | 2 | 5 | 3 | 12 | 11 | +1 | 9 | |
| 4 | Cảng Hải Phòng | 10 | 0 | 9 | 1 | 10 | 11 | −1 | 9 | |
| 5 | Tây Ninh | 10 | 2 | 4 | 4 | 7 | 9 | −2 | 8 | |
| 6 | An Giang | 10 | 2 | 4 | 4 | 7 | 12 | −5 | 8 | Relegated |

Source: RSSSF

=== Group C ===
| Pos | Team | Pld | W | D | L | GF | GA | GD | Pts | Qualification or relegation |
|---|---|---|---|---|---|---|---|---|---|---|
| 1 | Hải Quan | 8 | 5 | 2 | 1 | 12 | 3 | +9 | 12 | Qualify for Championship stage |
| 2 | Quân Khu Thủ Đô | 8 | 3 | 3 | 2 | 9 | 5 | +4 | 9 | |
| 3 | CNXD Hải Phòng | 8 | 3 | 2 | 3 | 5 | 5 | 0 | 8 | |
| 4 | Phú Khánh | 8 | 2 | 3 | 3 | 8 | 11 | −3 | 7 | |
| 5 | Đồng Tháp | 8 | 1 | 2 | 5 | 4 | 14 | −10 | 4 | Relegated |

Source: RSSSF

== Championship stage ==
| Pos | Team | Pld | W | D | L | GF | GA | GD | Pts | Qualification |
|---|---|---|---|---|---|---|---|---|---|---|
| 1 | Tổng Cục Đường Sắt | 2 | 2 | 0 | 0 | 3 | 1 | +2 | 4 | Champions |
| 2 | Công An Hà Nội | 2 | 1 | 0 | 1 | 3 | 3 | 0 | 2 | |
| 3 | Hải Quan | 2 | 0 | 0 | 2 | 1 | 3 | −2 | 0 | |

Source: RSSSF

Vietnam National A1 League
champions

1st title
