= Wanchai Suvaree =

Thai footballer

Personal information
- Date of birth: 1931
- Date of death: 1988 (aged 56–57)
- Position: Defender

International career
Years	Team	Apps	(Gls)
- Thailand

Wanchai Suvaree (1931 – 1998) was a Thai footballer. He competed in the men's tournament at the 1956 Summer Olympics.
