= South Vietnam Football Championship =

South Vietnam Division of Honour
- Organising body: Vietnam National Football Association
- Founded: 1950
- Folded: 1975
- Replaced by: Cửu Long League
- Country: South Vietnam
- Confederation: AFC
- Number of clubs: 12
- Level on pyramid: 1
- Relegation to: First Division
- Most championships: Tổng Tham Mưu (11 titles)

The South Vietnam Football Championship (Vietnamese: Giải vô địch bóng đá miền Nam Việt Nam), known as the Division of Honour (Vietnamese: Giải Vô địch Danh dự) was the top level of football in South Vietnam. It was founded in 1950.

Tổng Tham Mưu, Cảnh Sát Quốc Gia (known as Association de la Jeunesse Sportive - AJS before the 1960s) and Quan Thuế were the strongest teams of the league, being the only 3 teams to win the title before 1975.

After Vietnam's reunification in 1975, the new Vietnam Football Championship copied Soviet-model with regional championship and national championship. The North region named as Hồng Hà League, the Central named as Trường Sơn and the South named as Cửu Long. Regional champions joined the national play-off named from 1976 to 1979. In 1980, the National A1 Championship was established, merging the three regional leagues into a single championship.

== Champions ==
Season	Champion	Runner-up
Division of Honour
1950–51	AJS (1)	Unknown
1951–52	AJS (2)	Unknown
1952–53	AJS (3)	Unknown
1953–54	AJS (4)	Unknown
1954–55	AJS (5)	Unknown
1955–56	Tổng Tham Mưu (1)	Unknown
1956–57	Tổng Tham Mưu (2)	Unknown
1957–58	Tổng Tham Mưu (3)	Unknown
1958–59	Tổng Tham Mưu (4)	Unknown
1959–60	Tổng Tham Mưu (5)	Unknown
1960–61	Tổng Tham Mưu (6)	Unknown
1961–62	Quan Thuế (1)	Tổng Tham Mưu
1962–63	Tổng Tham Mưu (7)	Unknown
1963–64	Tổng Tham Mưu (8)	Unknown
1964–65	Quan Thuế (2)	Unknown
1965–66	Cảnh Sát Quốc Gia (6)	Unknown
1966–67	Quan Thuế (3)	Tổng Tham Mưu
1968–1969	Not organized	
1970	Cancelled mid-season due to financial issues	
1971	Tổng Tham Mưu (9)	Hải Quân
1971–72	Cảnh Sát Quốc Gia (7)	Tổng Tham Mưu
1972–73	Tổng Tham Mưu (10)	Unknown
1973–74	Tổng Tham Mưu (11)	Cảnh Sát Quốc Gia
1975	Cancelled after the Fall of Saigon	
Cửu Long League
1976	Hải Quan (1)	Cảng Sài Gòn
Ho Chi Minh City A1 League
1977	Cảng Sài Gòn (1)	Công Nghiệp Thực Phẩm
1978	Cảng Sài Gòn (2)	Công Nhân Hóa Chất
1979	Cảng Sài Gòn (3)	Hải Quan
