= Tong Cuc Duong Sat FC =

Railway General Department Football Club
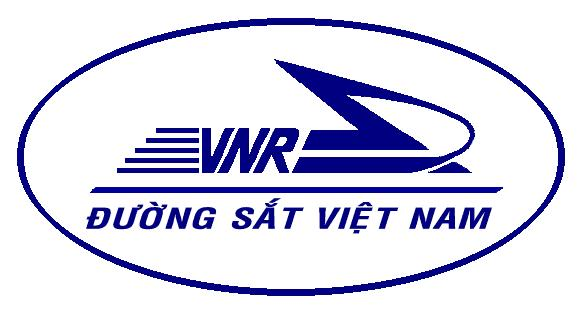
- Full name: Railway General Department Football Club
- Founded: 1956
- Dissolved: 2000
- Stadium: Hang Day
- Capacity: 22,500
Home colours	Away colours

Đội bóng đá Tổng cục Đường sắt (General Department of Railways Football Team) is a Vietnamese football club. They were champions in the 1980 season of the V-League, Vietnam's top-level association football league.

== Notable former players ==
- (Vietnam) Hoàng Văn Phúc
- (Vietnam) Lê Khắc Chính
- (Vietnam) Lê Thụy Hải
- (Vietnam) Mai Đức Chung
- (Vietnam) Trần Duy Long

== Achievements ==
- National A1 Championship:

(gold) Winners : 1980

- Vietnamese Cup:

(silver) Runners-up : 1993

- North Vietnam Football Championship:

(gold) Winners : 1960
(silver) Runners-up : 1958, 1959, 1963, 1964, 1976
