= Esteghlal F.C. in Asian football =

Football club based in the city of Tehran, Iran

Esteghlal F.C. in Asian football competitions
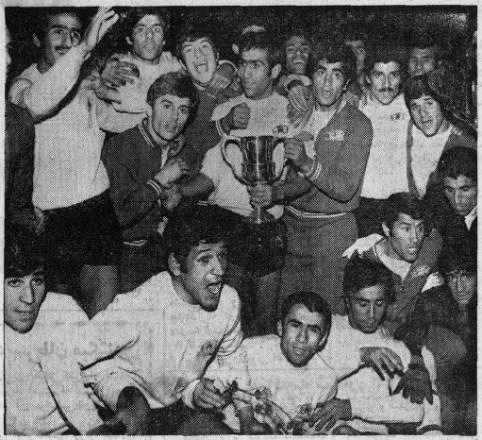
- Taj F.C. players after winning their first international silverware
- Club: Esteghlal F.C.
- Most appearances: Khosrow Heydari (56)
- Top scorer: Farhad Majidi (23)
- First entry: 1970 Asian Champion Club Tournament
- Latest entry: 2026–27 AFC Champions League Elite

Titles
- Champions League: 1970; 1990–91
- Afro-Asian Cup: ~~1991~~

Esteghlal F.C. are a football club based in the city of Tehran, Iran. Founded in 1946 they have been competing in AFC Champions League since 1970 and have become one of the most successful teams in Aisa, winning two major continental trophies including two Asian cups and are ranked joint second among all clubs across the continent in this regard. Esteghlal are by far Iran's most successful international representatives: no other teams from that nation have won Asia's premier competition more than once, or have more than two trophy wins overall.

== History ==
=== 1970s ===
Taj F.C. entered Asian competitions in 1970.

== Statistics ==
=== By season ===
Information correct as of 3 November 2026.
Key

- Pld = Played
- W = Games won
- D = Games drawn
- L = Games lost
- FF = Goals for
- GA = Goals against
- Grp = Group stage
- GS2 = Second group stage
- R1 = First round
- R2 = Second round
- R3 = Third round
- R4 = Fourth round
- R32 = Round of 32
- R16 = Round of 16
- QF = Quarter-finals
- SF = Semi-finals

Key to colours and symbols:

W	Winners
RU	Runners-up
3rd	Third place
4th	Fourth place
SF	Eliminated in semi final

Competitions	Pld	W	D	L	GF	GA	GD	Win%	Round
1970 Asian Champion Club Tournament	4	4	0	0	10	1	+9	100	W
1971 Asian Champion Club Tournament	6	3	1	2	10	8	+2	50	3rd
1990–91 Asian Club Championship	7	5	2	0	11	4	+7	72	W
1991 Asian Club Championship	6	2	3	1	9	4	+5	33	RU
1996–97 Asian Cup Winners' Cup	6	2	2	2	6	6	0	33	4th
1998–99 Asian Club Championship	7	4	1	2	11	8	+3	58	RU
1999–2000 Asian Cup Winners' Cup	4	2	1	1	16	2	+14	50	R2
2000–01 Asian Cup Winners' Cup	8	4	1	3	15	10	+5	50	4th
2001–02 Asian Club Championship	7	4	1	2	19	12	+7	58	3rd
2002–03 AFC Champions League	7	4	0	3	10	9	+1	58	Grp
2007 AFC Champions League	Disqualified								
2009 AFC Champions League	6	0	4	2	6	8	–2	0	Grp
2010 AFC Champions League	7	3	2	2	11	8	+3	43	R16
2011 AFC Champions League	6	2	2	2	11	10	+1	33	Grp
2012 AFC Champions League	9	5	2	2	13	6	+7	55	R16
2013 AFC Champions League	12	7	3	2	20	12	+8	58	SF
2014 AFC Champions League	6	2	1	3	7	7	0	33	Grp
2017 AFC Champions League	9	4	3	2	12	11	+1	44	R16
2018 AFC Champions League	10	4	4	2	15	12	+3	40	QF
2019 AFC Champions League	6	2	2	2	6	8	–2	33	Grp
2020 AFC Champions League	7	3	2	2	15	6	+9	43	R16
2021 AFC Champions League	7	3	2	2	14	10	+4	43	R16
2024–25 AFC Champions League Elite	10	2	7	3	8	12	–4	20	R16
2025–26 AFC Champions League Two	8	2	2	4	10	14	–4	25	R16
2026–27 AFC Champions League Elite	4	3	0	1	6	3	+3	75	

=== By competition ===
Competitions	Pld	W	D	L	GF	GA	GD	Win%
AFC Champions League	143	66	38	37	224	159	+65	46.15
AFC Champions League Two	8	2	4	4	10	14	– 4	25.00
Cup Winners' Cup	18	8	4	6	37	18	+19	44.44
Total	169	76	46	47	271	191	+80	44.97

== See also ==
- List of Esteghlal F.C. records and statistics
- List of Esteghlal F.C. honours
- List of Esteghlal F.C. seasons

== Bibliography ==
- Ahmadi, Seyyed Ali Akbar (21 December 2009). Esteghlal Full History of the Club from Docharkheh Savaran and Taj to Esteghlal. Paygan. ISBN 978-600-5096-54-5.
