= Persepolis F.C. in Asia =

These are the records of Persepolis F.C. and their statistics in Asian football competitions. They have won the Asian Cup Winners' Cup once (in 1990–91) and were also runners-up once in 1992–93. Persepolis have finished third place on three occasions and finished in fourth place once in the Asian Club Championship. They were also emerged as runners-up of the AFC Champions League in 2018 and 2020.

The first international game of that Persepolis played was on 26 July 1968 in Tehran, against the South Korean Army team.

== Overall ==
Persepolis was the first Iranian team to participate in the Asian Champion League. Persepolis earned three victories against Shahrbanai, Oghab and Pas, and a draw with Taj, to qualify for the 1969 Asian Cup. Persepolis was eliminated after two wins, a draw and a defeat in the group stage, and failed to reach the next two rounds.

AFC did not hold any club competitions on the continent from 1971 to 1985 due to political and security problems, and the opposition of the Arab countries with the presence of Israel in the competition.

Persepolis' second appearance in the Asian Cup came after winning the Hazfi Cup; Persepolis was eliminated by Bangladesh's Mohammedan SC, whose coach was Nasser Hejazi.

Following the introduction of the Asian Cup Winners' Cup, Persepolis qualified for the tournament on three occasions. In their first appearance in the competition, they won the title, and finished as runners-up on the second occasion.

In the 1990s (before the solar decade of the 1370s), and the early years of the new millennium, Persepolis participated in four editions of the AFC Champions League, reaching the semi-finals on each occasion. They subsequently reached the competition's final in 2018 and 2020, losing on both occasions.

- Correct as of 17 February 2025

Only official matches included (AFC Champions League and Asian Cup Winners' Cup matches).

Team	Country	Matches	Wins	Draws	Loses	Persepolis Goal(s)	Opponent Goal(s)
Al-Ahli	(Saudi Arabia)	5	2	1	2	8	6
Al-Ain	(United Arab Emirates)	2	1	1	0	4	2
Al-Ansar	(Lebanon)	3	2	1	0	4	0
Al-Arabi	(Qatar)	2	0	1	1	2	3
Al-Duhail	(Qatar)	10	4	1	5	9	10
Al-Gharafa	(Qatar)	5	2	2	1	9	8
Al-Hilal	(Saudi Arabia)	16	4	6	6	12	24
Al-Ittihad	(Saudi Arabia)	6	2	2	2	6	9
Al-Jazira	(United Arab Emirates)	2	1	0	1	4	4
Al-Nassr	(Saudi Arabia)	7	1	3	3	4	9
Al-Rayyan	(Qatar)	6	3	2	1	11	8
Al-Sadd	(Qatar)	8	4	1	3	7	6
Al-Salmiya	(Kuwait)	2	1	0	1	2	2
Al-Shabab	(Saudi Arabia)	2	1	1	0	1	0
Al-Shabab	(United Arab Emirates)	2	2	0	0	9	2
Al-Shorta	(Iraq)	2	1	1	0	2	1
Al Taawoun	(Saudi Arabia)	2	2	0	0	2	0
Al-Talaba	(Iraq)	1	1	0	0	1	0
Al-Wahda	(United Arab Emirates)	6	3	1	2	9	8
Al-Wakra	(Qatar)	2	2	0	0	9	3
Al Wasl	(United Arab Emirates)	2	2	0	0	3	0
Al-Zawraa	(Iraq)	4	3	1	0	8	2
Bani Yas	(United Arab Emirates)	2	1	1	0	3	2
Bunyodkor	(Uzbekistan)	5	2	1	2	4	5
Dalian Wanda	(China)	1	0	0	1	0	2
Fanja	(Oman)	2	1	1	0	2	0
Goa	(India)	2	2	0	0	6	1
Irtysh	(Kazakhstan)	3	2	1	0	3	0
Istiklol	(Tajikistan)	3	2	1	0	4	1
Júbilo Iwata	(Japan)	1	0	0	1	0	2
Kashima Antlers	(Japan)	2	0	1	1	0	2
Köpetdag Aşgabat	(Turkmenistan)	2	1	1	0	1	0
Kowloon Motor Bus	(Hong Kong)	1	1	0	0	4	0
Maccabi	(Israel)	1	0	1	0	0	0
Mohammedan	(Bangladesh)	1	0	0	1	1	2
Al-Muharraq	(Bahrain)	2	1	1	0	1	0
Nasaf	(Uzbekistan)	2	1	1	0	3	0
Navbahor	(Uzbekistan)	1	0	1	0	1	1
Nisa Aşgabat	(Turkmenistan)	1	1	0	0	4	1
Yokohama	(Japan)	2	0	1	1	1	2
Pakhtakor	(Uzbekistan)	5	1	2	2	4	4
Perak	(Malaysia)	1	1	0	0	4	2
Pohang Steelers	(South Korea)	1	0	0	1	1	3
Punjab	(Pakistan)	2	2	0	0	13	2
Saunders SC	(Sri Lanka)	1	1	0	0	5	0
Sharjah	(United Arab Emirates)	3	2	1	0	9	3
Suwon Samsung	(South Korea)	2	1	0	1	2	2
Sanfrecce Hiroshima	(Japan)	1	0	0	1	0	1
Ulsan Hyundai	(South Korea)	1	0	0	1	1	2
Elimai	(Kazakhstan)	2	1	0	1	5	3
Total		150	68	40	42	208	150

== Record by country of opposition ==
- Correct as of 17 February 2025

Country	P	W	D	L
Bahrain	2	1	1	0
Bangladesh	1	0	0	1
China	1	0	0	1
Hong Kong	1	1	0	0
India	2	2	0	0
Iraq	7	5	2	0
Israel	1	0	1	0
Japan	6	0	2	4
Kazakhstan	5	3	1	1
Kuwait	2	1	0	1
Lebanon	3	2	1	0
Malaysia	1	1	0	0
Oman	2	1	1	0
Pakistan	2	2	0	0
Qatar	33	15	7	11
Saudi Arabia	38	12	13	13
South Korea	4	1	0	3
Sri Lanka	1	1	0	0
Tajikistan	3	2	1	0
Turkmenistan	3	2	1	0
United Arab Emirates	19	12	4	3
Uzbekistan	13	4	5	4
Totals	150	68	40	42

P – Played; W – Won; D – Drawn; L – Lost

== Year by year performance ==
Below is a table of the performance of Persepolis in Asian competition.

Season	Competition	Round	Against	Played	Won	Drew	Lost	GF	GA
1969	Club Championship	Group Stage	—	4	2	1	1	8	3
1970	Did not qualify for AFC competitions								
1971	Did not qualify for AFC competitions								
1985–86	Did not qualify for AFC competitions								
1986	Did not qualify for AFC competitions								
1987	Did not qualify for AFC competitions								
1988–89	Club Championship	Qualifying Group Round	—	2	1	0	1	6	2
1989–90	Did not qualify for AFC competitions								
1990–91	Cup Winners' Cup	Winners	(Bahrain) Muharraq	6	4	2	0	15	2
1991–92	Did not qualify for AFC competitions								
1992–93	Cup Winners' Cup	Runners-up	(Japan) Nissan	8	3	4	1	8	5
1993–94	Cup Winners' Cup	Quarter-finals	(Qatar) Al-Arabi	4	1	1	2	4	5
1994–95	Did not qualify for AFC competitions								
1995	Did not qualify for AFC competitions								
1996–97	Club Championship	Third Place	(Iraq) Al-Zawraa	9	5	1	3	17	12
1997–98	Club Championship	Fourth Place	(Saudi Arabia) Al-Hilal	7	3	2	2	6	7
1998–99	Did not qualify for AFC competitions								
1999–2000	Club Championship	Third Place	(South Korea) Bluewings	7	3	3	1	5	2
2000–01	Club Championship	Third Place	(Kazakhstan) Irtysh	9	5	3	1	19	8
2001–02	Did not qualify for AFC competitions								
2002–03	Champions League	Group Stage	—	3	2	0	1	5	2
2004	Did not qualify for AFC competitions								
2005	Did not qualify for AFC competitions								
2006	Did not qualify for AFC competitions								
2007	Did not qualify for AFC competitions								
2008	Did not qualify for AFC competitions								
2009	Champions League	Round of 16	(Uzbekistan) Bunyodkor	6	3	1	2	8	8
2010	Did not qualify for AFC competitions								
2011	Champions League	Group stage	—	6	1	2	3	6	11
2012	Champions League	Round of 16	(Saudi Arabia) Al-Ittihad	7	3	2	2	14	8
2013	Did not qualify for AFC competitions								
2014	Did not qualify for AFC competitions								
2015	Champions League	Round of 16	(Saudi Arabia) Al-Hilal	8	5	0	3	8	10
2016	Did not qualify for AFC competitions								
2017	Champions League	Semi-finals	(Saudi Arabia) Al-Hilal	12	4	6	2	17	17
2018	Champions League	Runners-up	(Japan) Kashima Antlers	14	7	3	4	17	12
2019	Champions League	Group stage	—	6	2	1	3	6	5
2020	Champions League	Runners-up	(South Korea) Ulsan Hyundai	10	5	2	3	13	8
2021	Champions League	Quarter-finals	(Saudi Arabia) Al-Hilal	8	6	0	2	15	8
2022	Qualified for Champions League but failed to obtain an AFC license.								
2023–24	Champions League	Group stage	—	6	2	2	2	5	5
2024–25	Champions League Elite	League stage	—	8	1	4	3	6	10
2025–26	Did not qualify for AFC competitions								

As of 17 February 2025

AFC Competition	Played	Won	Drew	Lost	Goals for	Goals against
Champions League Elite	8	1	4	3	6	10
Champions League	86	40	19	27	114	94
Club Championship	38	19	10	9	61	34
Cup Winners' Cup	18	8	7	3	27	12
Total	150	68	40	42	208	150

== Records ==
=== Asian Cup Winners' Cup ===
==== Winners: 1 ====
  - Asian Cup Winners' Cup 1990–91

(Oct 4 & 18, 1991)

Team 1	Agg.	Team 2	1st leg	2nd leg
Muharraq (Bahrain)	0–1	(Iran) Persepolis	0–0	0–1

==== Runners-Up: 1 ====
  - Asian Cup Winners' Cup 1992–93

(Jan 17 & Apr 16, 1993)

Team 1	Agg.	Team 2	1st leg	2nd leg
Nissan (Japan)	2–1	(Iran) Persepolis	1–1	1–0

=== AFC Champions League ===
==== Runners-Up: 2 ====
  - AFC Champions League 2018

(Nov 3 & 10, 2018)

Team 1	Agg.	Team 2	1st leg	2nd leg
Kashima Antlers (Japan)	2–0	(Iran) Persepolis	2–0	0–0

  - AFC Champions League 2020

(Dec 19, 2020)

Team 1	Score	Team 2
(Iran) Persepolis	1–2	(South Korea) Ulsan Hyundai

== Goalscorers in Asia ==
Below is the list of best Goalscorers of Persepolis in Asia.

As of 17 February 2025

best Goalscorers in Asia
Rank	Player	Goals	Position
1	(Iran) Farshad Pious	11	Forward
1	(Iran) **Ali Alipour**	11	Forward
2	(Iran) Ali Karimi	10	Midfielder
3	(Iran) Mehdi Taremi	8	Forward
4	(Nigeria) Godwin Mensha	7	Forward
5	(Iran) Issa Alekasir	6	Forward
6	(Iran) Gholam Vafakhah	5	Midfielder
6	(Libya) Éamon Zayed	5	Forward
6	(Iran) Shoja' Khalilzadeh	5	Defender
6	(Iran) Mehdi Torabi	5	Winger

- Bold names denote a player still playing for club.

=== Hat-tricks ===
Key
^{4}	Player scored four goals
^{5}	Player scored five goals
^{6}	Player scored six goals
^{7}	Player scored seven goals

Player	Against	Result	Date
(Iran) Gholam Vafakhah	(Malaysia) Perak	4–2	20 January 1969
(Iran) Farshad Pious^{7}	(Pakistan) Punjab	9–0	21 December 1990
(Iran) Mojtaba Moharrami	(Pakistan) Punjab	4–2	30 December 1990
(Libya) Éamon Zayed	(United Arab Emirates) Al Shabab	6–1	21 March 2012
(Iran) Mehdi Taremi	(United Arab Emirates) Al Wahda	4–2	8 May 2017

== Most successful coaches ==
- Correct as of 17 February 2025

Rank	Head coach	Matches	Win	Draw	Lost	Points	Note
1	(Iran) Ali Parvin	35	18	12	5	66	ACWC: 1991 Winner – 1993 Runners up
2	(Croatia) Branko Ivanković	37	16	10	11	58	ACL: 2018 Runners up
3	(Iran) Yahya Golmohammadi	24	13	4	7	43	ACL: 2020 Runners up
4	(Croatia) Stanko Poklepović	9	5	1	3	16	
5	(Turkey) Mustafa Denizli	7	3	2	2	11	
6	(Croatia) Ivica Matković	7	3	2	2	11	
7	(Portugal) Nelo Vingada	6	3	1	2	10	
8	(Iran) Parviz Dehdari	4	2	1	1	7	
9	(Iran) Hamid Derakhshan	3	2	0	1	6	
10	(Spain) Juan Carlos Garrido	6	1	3	2	6	
11	(Iran) Ali Daei	6	1	2	3	5	
12	(Iran) Mohammad Panjali	4	1	1	2	4	
13	(Turkey) İsmail Kartal	2	0	1	1	1	

== Honours ==
- AFC Champions League
  - Runners-up (2): 2018, 2020
- Asian Club Championship
  - Third place (3): 1996–97, 1999–00, 2000–01
  - Fourth place (1): 1997–98
- Asian Cup Winners' Cup
  - Champions (1): 1990–91
  - Runners-up (1): 1992–93

== See also ==
- Iranian clubs in the AFC Champions League
- AFC Champions League
- Asian Cup Winners' Cup
