= 1970 RCD Cup =

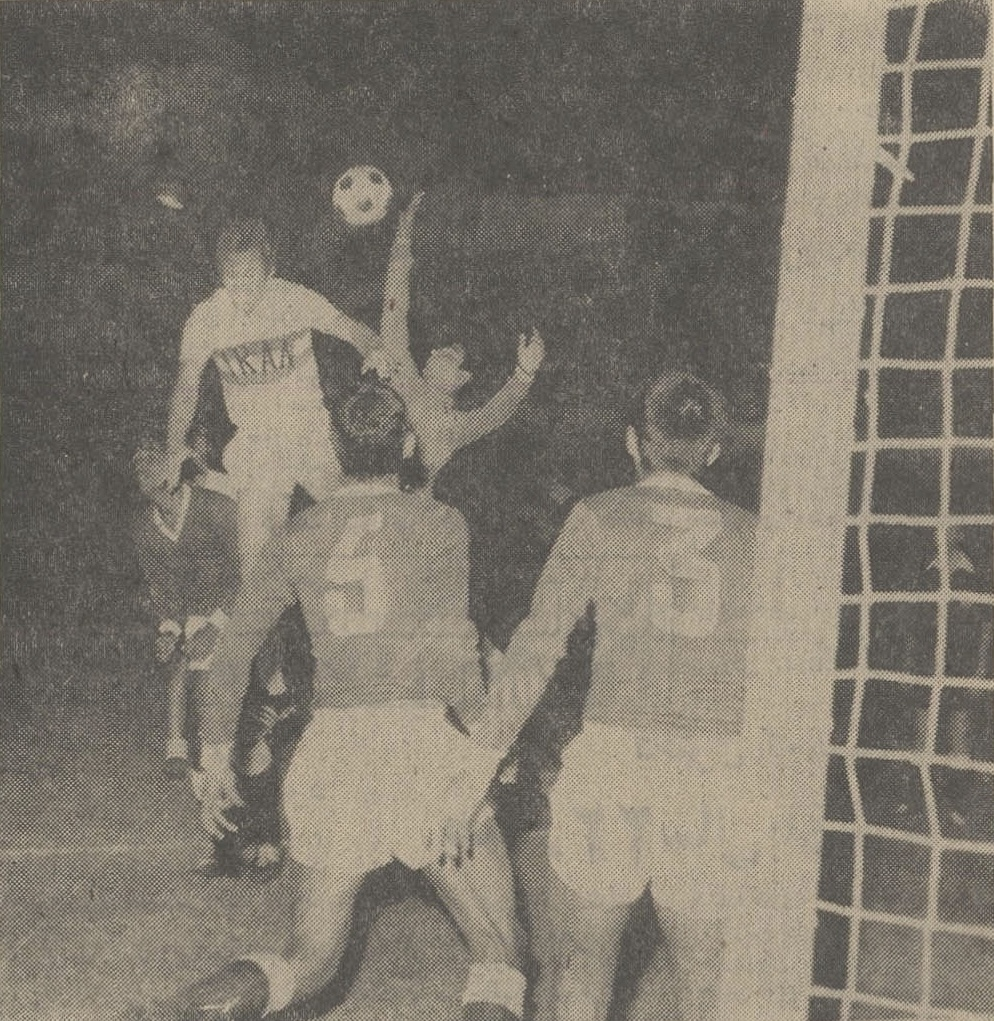
- Iran vs Pakistan at the 1970 RCD Cup

Tournament details
- Country: Iran
- Venue(s): Amjadiyeh Stadium, Tehran
- Dates: 6 September–11 September
- Teams: 3

Final positions
- Champions: Iran (2nd title)
- Runners-up: Turkey Amateurs
- Third place: Pakistan

Tournament statistics
- Matches played: 3
- Goals scored: 13 (4.33 per match)
- Attendance: 30,000 (10,000 per match)
- Top goal scorer: (Iran) Mehdi Haj Mohamad (3 goals)

The 1970 RCD Cup was the fourth edition of the RCD Cup. The event was held at the Amjadieh Stadium in Tehran, Iran.

This was a three-nation tournament played in league format between Iran, Pakistan, and Turkey Amateurs. Turkey entered the tournament as the two-time defending champion and fielded its amateur national team, which had been assembled and trained specifically for the RCD Cup a month earlier. While the amateur team competed in the tournament, Turkey's senior and Ümit national teams were separately preparing for matches against West Germany the following month.

== Venue ==
Tehran is located in Iran	Tehran
Tehran is located in Iran	Amjadieh Stadium
Tehran is located in Iran	Capacity: 30,000

== Results ==
Pos	Team	Pld	W	D	L	GF	GA	GD	Pts	Final result
1	Iran	2	1	1	0	8	1	+7	3	Champions
2	Turkey Amateurs	2	1	1	0	4	2	+2	3	
3	Pakistan	2	0	0	2	1	10	−9	0	

Source: RSSSF

== Matches ==
6 September 1970

Iran	7–0	Pakistan
M. Haj Mohamad 13', 90'; Ghelichkhani 33'; Haghverdian 55'; Kalani 57'; Nurunnabi 71' (o.g.); Vafakhah 84'	Report

Amjadiyeh Stadium, Tehran
Attendance: 20,000
Referee: Ertuğrul Dilek (Turkey)

9 September 1970

Turkey Amateurs	3–1	Pakistan
Mustafa Türel 13'; Aldoğan Argon 34'; Cevher Özer 53'	Report	Dar 20'

Amjadiyeh Stadium, Tehran
Referee: Ali Daneifard (Iran)

11 September 1970

Turkey Amateurs	1–1	Iran
Cevher Özer 26'	Report	M. Haj Mohamad 70'

Amjadiyeh Stadium, Tehran
Attendance: 30,000
Referee: Muhammad Amin (Pakistan)

== Top scorers ==
=== 3 Goals ===
- (Iran) Mehdi Haj Mohamad

=== 2 Goals ===
- (Turkey) Cevher Özer

=== 1 goal ===
- (Iran) Parviz Ghelichkhani
- (Iran) Karo Haghverdian
- (Iran) Hossein Kalani
- (Iran) Gholam Vafakhah
- (Pakistan) Ayub Dar
- (Turkey) Mustafa Türel
- (Turkey) Aldoğan Argon

== Squads ==
=== Iran ===
Head coach: (Iran) Mahmoud Bayati

No.	Pos.	Player	Date of birth (age)	Caps	Club
1	GK	Nasser Hejazi	19 December 1949 (aged 20)		(Iran) Taj
2	DF	Ebrahim Ashtiani	4 January 1942 (aged 28)		(Iran) Persepolis
3	MF	Parviz Ghelichkhani	4 December 1945 (aged 24)		(Iran) Taj
4	DF	Hassan Habibi (c)	7 February 1939 (aged 31)		(Iran) Pas
5	DF	Jafar Kashani	4 March 1945 (aged 25)		(Iran) Persepolis
6	MF	Ali Parvin	25 September 1947 (aged 22)		(Iran) Persepolis
7	MF	Mostafa Arab	31 December 1942 (aged 27)		(Iran) Oghab
8	MF	Ali Jabbari	20 July 1946 (aged 24)		(Iran) Taj
9	FW	Hossein Kalani	23 June 1940 (aged 30)		(Iran) Persepolis
10	FW	Gholam Hossein Mazloumi	13 January 1950 (aged 20)		(Iran) Taj
11	FW	Gholam Vafakhah	23 February 1947 (aged 23)		(Iran) Taj
12	GK	Keyvan Niknafas	1946		(Iran) Pas
13	MF	Parviz Mirzahasan	15 October 1945 (aged 24)		(Iran) Pas
14	MF	Karo Haghverdian	11 January 1945 (aged 25)		(Iran) Taj
15	DF	Mehdi Monajati	29 June 1947 (aged 23)		(Iran) Pas
16	DF	Reza Vatankhah	9 February 1947 (aged 23)		(Iran) Persepolis
17	FW	Mehdi Haj Mohamad	7 July 1950 (aged 20)		(Iran) Taj
18	DF	Mahmoud Yavari	11 October 1939 (aged 30)		(Iran) Pas

=== Pakistan ===
Head coach: (Pakistan) Muhammad Amin

No.	Pos.	Player	Date of birth (age)	Caps	Club
	GK	Afzal Hussain			(Pakistan) Lahore Division
	GK	Khandoker Mohammad Nurunnabi	31 July 1946 (aged 24)		(Pakistan) Mohammedan Sporting
	DF	Ali Muhammad			East Pakistan
	DF	Zakaria Pintoo	1 January 1943 (aged 27)		(Pakistan) Mohammedan Sporting
	DF	Mujahid Tareen	11 August 1949 (aged 21)		(Pakistan) Afghan FC
	DF	Muhammad Aslam Japani	1 January 1941 (aged 29)		(Pakistan) Lahore Division
	DF	Amir Bakhsh			(Pakistan) Mohammedan Sporting
	DF	Ashiq Ali			(Pakistan) Karachi Division
	DF	Chaudhry Muhammad Asghar	1945 (aged 25)		Pakistan Railways
	MF	Younus Rana	10 April 1941 (aged 29)		Pakistan Railways
	MF	Qadir Bakhsh (c)	10 October 1947 (aged 22)		(Pakistan) EPIDC
	FW	Ghulam Sarwar	1953 (aged 17)		(Pakistan) Karachi Port Trust
	FW	Ayub Dar	5 December 1947 (aged 22)		(Pakistan) Mohammedan Sporting
	FW	Hafiz Uddin Ahmad	29 October 1944 (aged 25)		(Pakistan) Mohammedan Sporting
	FW	Muhammad Idrees Sr.			(Pakistan) Mohammedan Sporting
	FW	Younus Changezi	4 November 1944 (aged 25)		Pakistan Army
	FW	Allah Bakhsh	1949 (aged 21)		Pakistan Airlines
	FW	Haji Ilyas			(Pakistan) Warsak FC

=== Turkey Amateurs ===
Head coach: (Turkey) Doğan Andaç

No.	Pos.	Player	Date of birth (age)	Caps	Club
	GK	Mustafa Kalkandelen	15 January 1952 (aged 18)		(Turkey) Manisaspor
	GK	Erdoğan Demirdöven			(Turkey) Sivasspor
	GK	Mustafa Güngören	8 May 1951 (aged 19)		(Turkey) Altınordu
	DF	Oktay Ertem	13 February 1944 (aged 26)		(Turkey) Kocaelispor
	DF	Müjdat Yalman	14 August 1949 (aged 21)		(Turkey) Ankaragücü
	DF	Ahmet Hamdi Kayahan	12 December 1947 (aged 22)		(Turkey) Hatayspor
	MF	Timuçin Çuğ	14 September 1951 (aged 18)		(Turkey) Ankara Demirspor
	MF	Adem Kurukaya	25 November 1950 (aged 19)		(Turkey) Samsunspor
	MF	Ali Çağlar	1 January 1951 (aged 19)		(Turkey) Göztepe
	MF	Ali Osman Renklibay	24 October 1948 (aged 21)		(Turkey) Ceyhanspor
	MF	Olcay Başarır	1 July 1949 (aged 21)		(Turkey) Galatasaray
	MF	Cevher Özer	9 January 1949 (aged 21)		(Turkey) PTT
	MF	Aldoğan Argon	24 March 1952 (aged 18)		(Turkey) Petrol Ofisi
	FW	Mustafa Türel	15 March 1951 (aged 19)		(Turkey) İzmirspor
	FW	Sinan Bür	15 November 1950 (aged 19)		(Turkey) Bursaspor
