= Muhammad Amin (footballer) =

Pakistani footballer

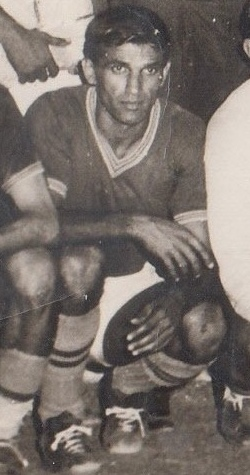
- Amin with Pakistan Air Force in 1963

Personal information
- Full name: Muhammad Amin
- Date of birth: 1931
- Place of birth: Unknown
- Date of death: 9 August 1979 (aged 47–48)
- Place of death: Gujrat district, Pakistan
- Position: Right winger

Senior career*
Years	Team	Apps	(Gls)
1949–1951	Selangor		
1951–1963	Pakistan Air Force		
1964	Mohammedan		

International career
1953–1963	Pakistan		

Managerial career
- 1967–1973: Pakistan
- 1973: Pakistan Youth
- 1977–1979: Pakistan Airlines
- * Club domestic league appearances and goals

Muhammad Amin (1931 – 9 August 1979) was a Pakistani international footballer who played as right winger, and manager. He served as captain of the Pakistan national football team at the 1964 Summer Olympics qualification, and is one of the players to have played and coached the national team. He also played for Selangor in Malaya and Pakistan Air Force at club level. He won the Malaysia Cup twice with Selangor.

== Club career ==
=== Selangor ===
Amin started playing football in a school at Malaya and later played for a leading club, namely Selangor in 1949. He played as a right-back at the club. Amin helped the team win the Malaysia Cup in 1949 and again in 1951.

=== Pakistan Air Force ===
In 1951, Amin left Malaya, joining the Pakistan Air Force as physical instructor.

He represented the Pakistan Air Force football team at the Inter-Services Tournament in 1952 and 1953 and at the National Football Championship. In 1951, he switched his position to inside-right, or at the right of the wing. Amin was a part of the team till 1963.

=== Mohammedan ===
In 1964, Amin joined Mohammedan SC of East Pakistan in the Dhaka First Division League. During his stay in Dhaka, Amin was initially appointed captain of the Dhaka Division team for the National Football Championship. However, he was later dropped following a dispute with the team's goalkeeper, Sitanghshu, during which Amin displayed prejudice against him for not being a native Urdu speaker. His club teammate, Abid Ghazi, replaced him as captain.

== International career ==
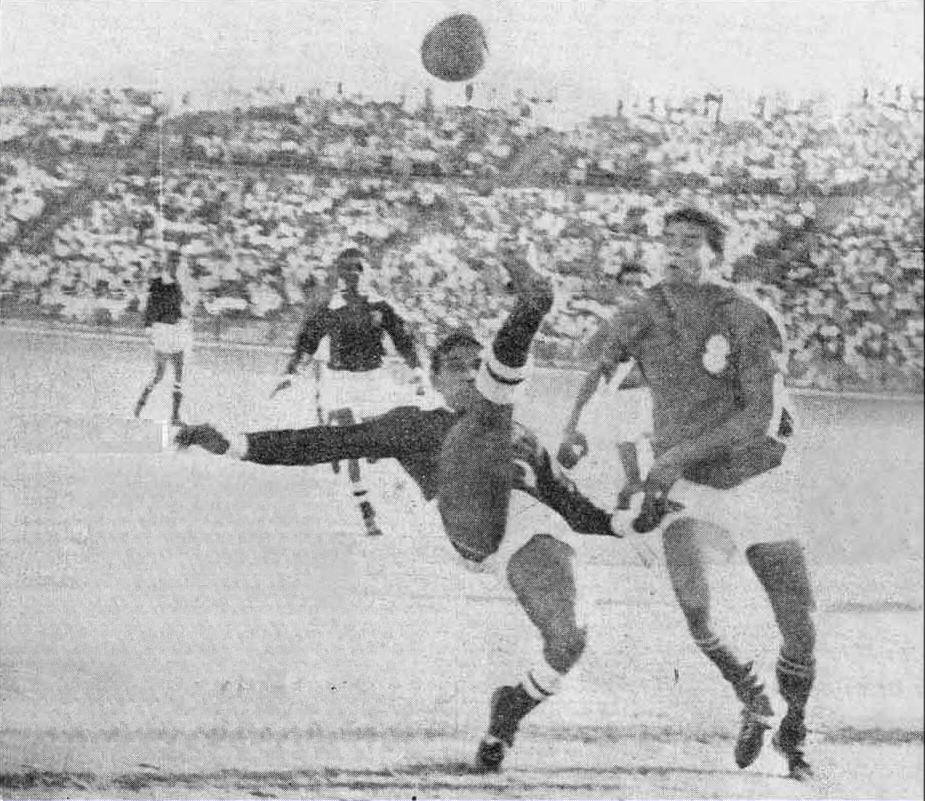
Amin clearing the ball with a bicycle kick from Iranian Hamid Shirzadegan during the second leg of the 1964 Summer Olympics qualification

Following his performance at the 1953 season of the National Football Championship for Pakistan Air Force held in Peshawar, he was selected for the Pakistan national team at the 1953 Asian Quadrangular Football Tournament held in Rangoon, Burma. He participated at the 1954 Asian Games with Pakistan at the age of 23. Singapore Standard described him as "Malaya's loss and Pakistan gain" due to the former losing a key player of Selangor.

In 1956, he was appointed vice-captain of the national team. Later on in 1963, he was appointed captain to lead the national team at the 1964 Summer Olympics qualification against Iran in both legs.

== Coaching career ==
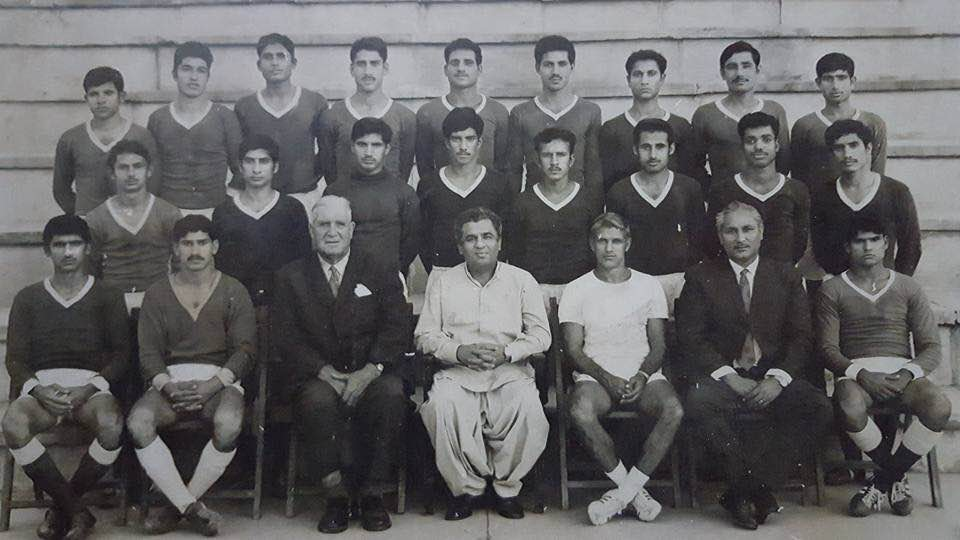
Amin (sitting third from right) with the Pakistan youth football team in 1973

In 1967, Amin was appointed as head coach of the Pakistan national team for the 1968 AFC Asian Cup qualification. He subsequently coached the team in several tournaments including the 1967 RCD Cup, 1969 Friendship Cup, 1969 RCD Cup, and 1970 RCD Cup.

In 1973, he coached in a friendly tour of the Pakistan national team to China, Hong Kong and North Korea which included several test matches against local clubs and a friendly against the China national team. He also coached the Pakistan youth football team at the 1973 AFC Youth Championship.

In 1977, he was appointed head coach of Pakistan Airlines in 1977 by Air Marshall Nur Khan, and led the team to the 1978 National Football Championship title.

== Refereeing career ==
Amin also served as referee, retiring from the field in 1971. He refereed the match between Iran and Turkey XI at the 1970 RCD Cup.

== Death ==
Amin died prematurely on 9 August 1979, after an illness. He was buried in his village Khohar, in the Gujrat district.

== Career statistics ==
=== International goals ===
Scores and results list Pakistan's goal tally first, score column indicates score after each Amin goal.

List of international goals scored by Muhammad Amin
No.	Date	Venue	Opponent	Score	Result	Competition	Ref.
1	21 December 1954	Calcutta FC Ground, Kolkata, India	Ceylon		2–1	1954 Asian Quadrangular Football Tournament	

== Honours ==
Selangor

- Malaysia Cup:
  - Winners (2): 1949, 1951

== See also ==
- List of Pakistan national football team captains
