= Iranian football clubs in Asian competitions =

The Persian Gulf Pro League clubs in the AFC Champions League.This details the participation and performances in the competition since its based at 2002 as a result of the merger between the Asian Club Championship, the Asian Cup Winners' Cup and the Asian Super Cup.

== Results ==
AFC Champions League / AFC Champions League Elite
Team	Qualified	2002-03	2004	2005	2006	2007	2008	2009	2010	2011	2012	2013	2014	2015	2016	2017	2018	2019	2020	2021	2022	2023–24	2024–25	2025–26
Esteghlal	14	GS	–			DQ	–	GS	R16	GS	R16	SF	GS	–		R16	QF	GS	R16	R16	DQ	–	R16	–
Sepahan	14	–	GS	GS	–	RU	GS	GS	GS	QF	QF	GS	GS	–					GS	–	GS	R16	PO	PO
Persepolis	12	GS	–					R16	–	GS	R16	–				SF	RU	GS	RU	QF	DQ	GS	LS	–
Tractor	8	–										GS	GS	GS	R16	–	GS	–		R16	–	PO	–	Q
Zob Ahan	7	–	GS	–					RU	QF	PO	–				GS	R16	R16	–					
Foolad	5	–			GS	–							R16	GS	–					GS	QF	–		
Saba Qom	3	–			GS	–		GS	–			PO	–											
Saipa	2	–					QF	–										PO	–					
PAS Tehran	1	–		QF	–																			
Mes Kerman	1	–							R16	–														
Naft Tehran	1	–												QF	PO	–								
Esteghlal Khuzestan	1	–														R16	–							
Shahr Khodro	1	–																	GS	–				
Nassaji Mazandaran	1	–																				GS	–	

AFC Champions League Two
Team	Qualified	2024-25	2025–26
Sepahan	2	GS	Q
Tractor	1	QF	–
Esteghlal	1	–	Q

Legend

- Q : Qualified
- DQ: Disqualified
- PO : Qualifying play-off round
- GS : Group stage
- LS : League stage
- R16 : Round of 16
- QF : Quarter-finals
- SF : Semi-finals
- RU : Runners-Up
- C : Champions

== Statistics ==
=== Statistics by club ===
This table includes results beyond group stage of the AFC Champions League through 2002/03 season, therefore:

- It does not include the old Asian Club Championship
- It does not include Qualifying rounds

As of 11 March 2025

#	Team	Pld	W	D	L	GF	GA	GD	Pts	Best Finish
1	Persepolis	93	40	23	30	117	103	+14	143	Runners-up
2	Sepahan	96	42	18	36	144	124	+20	141	Runners-up
3	Esteghlal	93	34	30	29	128	115	+13	132	Semi Finals
4	Zob Ahan	55	26	14	15	73	56	+17	92	Runners-up
5	Foolad	34	11	13	10	32	27	+5	46	Round of 16
6	Tractor Sazi	41	10	12	19	43	55	−12	42	Round of 16
7	Pas	8	5	3	0	16	8	+8	18	Quarter Finals
8	Saba	12	4	3	5	20	17	+3	15	Group Stage
9	Saipa	8	3	4	1	10	10	0	13	Quarter Finals
10	Naft Tehran	10	3	2	5	11	13	−2	11	Quarter Finals
11	Mes Kerman	7	3	0	4	13	14	−1	9	Round of 16
12	Esteghlal Khuzestan	8	2	3	3	8	9	−1	9	Round of 16
13	Nasaji Mazandaran	6	2	0	4	7	10	−3	6	Group Stage
14	Shahr Khodro	4	0	0	4	0	6	−6	0	Group Stage

=== Statistics by season ===
As of 11 March 2025 (Excludes Qualification)

Season	Teams	Pld	W	D	L	GF	GA	GD	Points
2002–03	2	6	3	0	3	10	9	+1	9
2004	2	10	5	3	2	19	15	+4	18
2005	2	14	8	5	1	26	14	+12	29
2006	2	12	4	2	6	21	17	+4	14
2007	1	12	5	5	2	16	9	+7	20
2008	2	14	5	5	4	15	18	−3	20
2009	4	23	5	8	10	27	31	−4	23
2010	4	32	16	6	10	44	35	+9	54
2011	4	30	14	7	9	49	38	+11	49
2012	3	26	13	6	7	39	24	+15	45
2013	3	25	11	5	9	41	38	+3	38
2014	4	28	9	8	11	33	28	+5	35
2015	4	31	11	6	14	29	38	−9	39
2016	3	22	10	3	9	29	24	+5	33
2017	4	32	12	11	9	41	40	+1	47
2018	4	39	15	10	14	48	50	−2	55
2019	3	24	10	6	8	35	29	+6	36
2020	4	29	11	6	12	36	29	+7	39
2021	4	29	13	8	8	42	28	+14	47
2022	2	14	6	4	4	14	15	–1	22
2023–24	3	20	7	3	10	30	29	+1	24
2024–25 (ACLE, ACL2)	4	32	10	13	9	49	39	+10	37
2025–26 (ACLE, ACL2)	3								
Total	68	504	203	130	171	693	597	+97	733

== Games by club ==
Match won	Match drawn	Match lost

=== Bahman ===
Bahman results
Season	Round	Opponent	Home	Away	Aggregate
1995 Asian Cup Winners' Cup	2R	(Kazakhstan) Vostok Ust-Kamenogorsk	1–1	2–2	3–3 (a)
1995 Asian Cup Winners' Cup	QF	(Iraq) Al Talaba	0–1	1–1	1–2

=== Bargh Shiraz ===
Bargh Shiraz results
Season	Round	Opponent	Home	Away	Aggregate
1997–98 Asian Cup Winners' Cup	2R	(Iraq) Al-Shorta	1–1	1–2	2–3

=== Taj/Esteghlal ===
Taj/Esteghlal results
Season	Round	Opponent	Home	Away	Aggregate
1970 Asian Champion Club Tournament	Group A	(Lebanon) Homenetmen	3–0		1st
1970 Asian Champion Club Tournament	Group A	(Malaysia) Selangor FA	3–0		1st
1970 Asian Champion Club Tournament	SF	(Indonesia) PSMS Medan	2–0		
1970 Asian Champion Club Tournament	Final	(Israel) Hapoel Tel Aviv	2–1 (a.e.t.)		
1971 Asian Champion Club Tournament	PR	(Iraq) Aliyat Al-Shorta	2–3		
1971 Asian Champion Club Tournament	Group A	(South Korea) ROK Army	2–1		1st
1971 Asian Champion Club Tournament	Group A	(Kuwait) Al-Arabi	0–0		1st
1971 Asian Champion Club Tournament	Group A	(Malaysia) Perak FA	3–0		1st
1971 Asian Champion Club Tournament	SF	(Iraq) Aliyat Al-Shorta	0–2		
1971 Asian Champion Club Tournament	3PPO	(South Korea) ROK Army	3–2		
1990–91 Asian Club Championship	Group 2	(Qatar) Al Sadd	1–0	1–1	2–1
1990–91 Asian Club Championship	Group B	(North Korea) April 25	2–1		1st
1990–91 Asian Club Championship	Group B	(Thailand) Bangkok Bank	2–0		1st
1990–91 Asian Club Championship	Group B	(Bangladesh) Mohammedan SC	1–1		1st
1990–91 Asian Club Championship	SF	(Indonesia) Pelita Jaya Jakarta	2–0		
1990–91 Asian Club Championship	Final	(China) Liaoning FC	2–1		
1991 Asian Club Championship	2R	(Yemen) Al-Tilal	5–0	0–0	5–0
1991 Asian Club Championship	Group B	(Saudi Arabia) Al-Hilal	0–1		2nd
1991 Asian Club Championship	Group B	(North Korea) April 25	1–1		2nd
1991 Asian Club Championship	SF	(Qatar) Al-Rayyan	2–1		
1991 Asian Club Championship	Final	(Saudi Arabia) Al-Hilal	1–1 (a.e.t.) (2–3 (p))		
1996–97 Asian Cup Winners' Cup	2R	(Uzbekistan) Navbahor Namangan	3–0	1–4	4–4 (a)
1996–97 Asian Cup Winners' Cup	QF	(Kazakhstan) Ordabasy-SKIF Chimkent	1–0	1–1	2–1
1996–97 Asian Cup Winners' Cup	SF	(Saudi Arabia) Al-Hilal	0–0 (a.e.t.) (4–5 (p))		
1996–97 Asian Cup Winners' Cup	3PPO	(South Korea) Ulsan Hyundai Horang-i	0–1		
1998–99 Asian Club Championship	R16	(Iraq) Al-Quwa Al-Jawiya	2–0	1–1	3–1
1998–99 Asian Club Championship	QF	(Saudi Arabia) Al-Hilal	2–1		2nd
1998–99 Asian Club Championship	QF	(United Arab Emirates) Al-Ain	1–0		2nd
1998–99 Asian Club Championship	QF	(Turkmenistan) Köpetdag Aşgabat	0–1		2nd
1998–99 Asian Club Championship	SF	(China) Dalian Wanda	4–3 (a.e.t.)		
1998–99 Asian Club Championship	Final	(Japan) Júbilo Iwata	1–2		
1999–2000 Asian Cup Winners' Cup	1R	(Lebanon) Al-Hikma	7–0	8–0	15–0
1999–2000 Asian Cup Winners' Cup	2R	(Saudi Arabia) Al-Ittihad	1–1	0–1	1–2
2000–01 Asian Cup Winners' Cup	1R	(United Arab Emirates) Al Wahda	4–0	2–3	6–3
2000–01 Asian Cup Winners' Cup	2R	(Qatar) Al Sadd	2–1	1–0	3–1
2000–01 Asian Cup Winners' Cup	QF	(Kazakhstan) SOPFK Kairat Almaty	3–0	0–0	3–0
2000–01 Asian Cup Winners' Cup	SF	(Saudi Arabia) Al-Shabab	2–3		
2000–01 Asian Cup Winners' Cup	3PPO	(Japan) Shimizu S-Pulse	1–3		
2001–02 Asian Club Championship	1R	(Lebanon) Al-Hikma	w/o		
2001–02 Asian Club Championship	R16	(Saudi Arabia) Al-Ittihad	2–1	2–3	4–4 (a)
2001–02 Asian Club Championship	QF	(United Arab Emirates) Al Wahda	5–3		1st
2001–02 Asian Club Championship	QF	(Uzbekistan) Nasaf Qarshi	1–1		1st
2001–02 Asian Club Championship	QF	Al-Kuwait	3–0		1st
2001–02 Asian Club Championship	SF	(South Korea) Anyang LG Cheetahs	1–2		
2001–02 Asian Club Championship	3PPO	(Uzbekistan) Nasaf Qarshi	5–2		
2002–03 AFC Champions League	Group C	(Qatar) Al Sadd	2–1		3rd
2002–03 AFC Champions League	Group C	(Saudi Arabia) Al-Hilal	2–3		3rd
2002–03 AFC Champions League	Group C	(United Arab Emirates) Al-Ain	1–3		3rd
2009 AFC Champions League	Group C	(Saudi Arabia) Al-Ittihad	1–1	0–1	4th
2009 AFC Champions League	Group C	(United Arab Emirates) Al-Jazira	1–1	2–2	4th
2009 AFC Champions League	Group C	(Qatar) Umm-Salal	1–1	0–1	4th
2010 AFC Champions League	Group A	(Saudi Arabia) Al-Ahli	2–1	2–1	2nd
2010 AFC Champions League	Group A	(United Arab Emirates) Al-Jazira	0–0	1–2	2nd
2010 AFC Champions League	Group A	(Qatar) Al-Gharafa	3–0	1–1	2nd
2010 AFC Champions League	R16	(Saudi Arabia) Al-Shabab	2–3		
2011 AFC Champions League	Group B	(Qatar) Al Sadd	1–1	2–2	3rd
2011 AFC Champions League	Group B	(Saudi Arabia) Al-Nassr	2–1	1–2	3rd
2011 AFC Champions League	Group B	(Uzbekistan) Pakhtakor	4–2	1–2	3rd
2012 AFC Champions League	PR2	(Iran) Zob Ahan	2–0		
2012 AFC Champions League	PO	(Saudi Arabia) Al-Ettifaq	3–1		
2012 AFC Champions League	Group A	(Qatar) Al-Rayyan	3–0	1–0	2nd
2012 AFC Champions League	Group A	(Uzbekistan) Nasaf Qarshi	0–0	2–0	2nd
2012 AFC Champions League	Group A	(United Arab Emirates) Al-Jazira	1–2	1–1	2nd
2012 AFC Champions League	R16	(Iran) Sepahan	0–2		
2013 AFC Champions League	Group D	(Qatar) Al-Rayyan	3–0	3–3	1st
2013 AFC Champions League	Group D	(United Arab Emirates) Al-Ain	2–0	1–0	1st
2013 AFC Champions League	Group D	(Saudi Arabia) Al-Hilal	0–1	2–1	1st
2013 AFC Champions League	R16	(United Arab Emirates) Al-Shabab Al-Arabi	0–0	4–2	4–2
2013 AFC Champions League	QF	(Thailand) Buriram United	1–0	2–1	3–1
2013 AFC Champions League	SF	(South Korea) FC Seoul	2–2	0–2	2–4
2014 AFC Champions League	Group A	(Saudi Arabia) Al-Shabab	0–1	1–2	3rd
2014 AFC Champions League	Group A	(Qatar) Al-Rayyan	3–1	0–1	3rd
2014 AFC Champions League	Group A	(United Arab Emirates) Al-Jazira	2–2	1–0	3rd
2017 AFC Champions League	PO	(Qatar) Al Sadd	0–0 (4–3 (p))		
2017 AFC Champions League	Group A	(United Arab Emirates) Al-Ahli	1–1	1–2	2nd
2017 AFC Champions League	Group A	(Saudi Arabia) Al-Taawoun	3–0	2–1	2nd
2017 AFC Champions League	Group A	(Uzbekistan) Lokomotiv Tashkent	2–0	1–1	2nd
2017 AFC Champions League	R16	(United Arab Emirates) Al-Ain	1–0	1–6	2–6
2018 AFC Champions League	Group D	(Qatar) Al-Rayyan	2–0	2–2	1st
2018 AFC Champions League	Group D	(Saudi Arabia) Al-Hilal	1–0	0–1	1st
2018 AFC Champions League	Group D	(United Arab Emirates) Al-Ain	1–1	2–2	1st
2018 AFC Champions League	R16	(Iran) Zob Ahan	3–1	0–1	3–2
2018 AFC Champions League	QF	(Qatar) Al Sadd	1–3	2–2	3–5
2019 AFC Champions League	Group C	(Qatar) Al-Duhail	1–1	0–3	3rd
2019 AFC Champions League	Group C	(United Arab Emirates) Al-Ain	1–1	2–1	3rd
2019 AFC Champions League	Group C	(Saudi Arabia) Al-Hilal	2–1	0–1	3rd
2020 AFC Champions League	PR2	Al Kuwait	3–0		
2020 AFC Champions League	PO	(Qatar) Al-Rayyan	5–0		
2020 AFC Champions League	Group A	(Iraq) Al-Shorta	1–1	1–1	2nd
2020 AFC Champions League	Group A	(Saudi Arabia) Al-Ahli	3–0	1–2	2nd
2020 AFC Champions League	R16	(Uzbekistan) Pakhtakor	1–2		
2021 AFC Champions League	Group C	(Saudi Arabia) Al-Ahli	5–2	0–0	1st
2021 AFC Champions League	Group C	(Iraq) Al-Shorta	1–0	3–0	1st
2021 AFC Champions League	Group C	(Qatar) Al-Duhail	2–2	3–4	1st
2021 AFC Champions League	R16	(Saudi Arabia) Al-Hilal	0–2		
2024–25 AFC Champions League Elite	League Stage	(Qatar) Al-Gharafa	3–0	—N/a	6th
2024–25 AFC Champions League Elite	League Stage	(Qatar) Al Sadd	—N/a	0–2	6th
2024–25 AFC Champions League Elite	League Stage	(Saudi Arabia) Al-Nassr	0–1	—N/a	6th
2024–25 AFC Champions League Elite	League Stage	(Saudi Arabia) Al-Hilal	—N/a	0–3	6th
2024–25 AFC Champions League Elite	League Stage	(Uzbekistan) Pakhtakor	0–0	—N/a	6th
2024–25 AFC Champions League Elite	League Stage	(Saudi Arabia) Al-Ahli	—N/a	2–2	6th
2024–25 AFC Champions League Elite	League Stage	(Iraq) Al-Shorta	1–1	—N/a	6th
2024–25 AFC Champions League Elite	League Stage	(Qatar) Al-Rayyan	—N/a	2–0	6th
2024–25 AFC Champions League Elite	R16	(Saudi Arabia) Al-Nassr	0–0	0–3	0–3
2025–26 AFC Champions League Two	Group stage	(United Arab Emirates) Al Wasl	1–1	1–7	2nd
2025–26 AFC Champions League Two	Group stage	(Bahrain) Al-Muharraq	0–1	3–0	2nd
2025–26 AFC Champions League Two	Group stage	(Jordan) Al-Wehdat	2–0	1–1	2nd
2025–26 AFC Champions League Two	R16	(Jordan) Al-Hussein	0–1	2–3	2–4
2026–27 AFC Champions League Elite	League Stage	(Qatar) Al Sadd	3–0	—N/a	TBD
2026–27 AFC Champions League Elite	League Stage	(Qatar) Al-Gharafa	—N/a	2–1	TBD
2026–27 AFC Champions League Elite	League Stage	(United Arab Emirates) Shabab Al Ahli	—N/a	0–2	TBD
2026–27 AFC Champions League Elite	League Stage	(Qatar) Al-Shamal	3 Nov	—N/a	TBD
2026–27 AFC Champions League Elite	League Stage	(United Arab Emirates) Al-Ain	—N/a	23 Nov	TBD
2026–27 AFC Champions League Elite	League Stage	(Uzbekistan) Neftchi	7 Dec	—N/a	TBD
2026–27 AFC Champions League Elite	League Stage	(Uzbekistan) Pakhtakor	—N/a	8 Feb	TBD
2026–27 AFC Champions League Elite	League Stage	(United Arab Emirates) Al Wasl	15 Feb	—N/a	TBD

=== Esteghlal Khuzestan ===
Esteghlal Khuzestan results
Season	Round	Opponent	Home	Away	Aggregate
2017 AFC Champions League	Group B	(Saudi Arabia) Al-Fateh	1–0	1–1	2nd
2017 AFC Champions League	Group B	(United Arab Emirates) Al-Jazira	1–1	1–0	2nd
2017 AFC Champions League	Group B	(Qatar) Lekhwiya	1–1	1–2	2nd
2017 AFC Champions League	R16	(Saudi Arabia) Al-Hilal	1–2	1–2	2–4

=== Fajr Sepasi ===
Fajr Sepasi results
Season	Round	Opponent	Home	Away	Aggregate
2001–02 Asian Cup Winners' Cup	1R	(Qatar) Al Sadd	1–1 (a.e.t.)	1–1	2–2 (3–5(p))

=== Foolad ===
Foolad results
Season	Round	Opponent	Home	Away	Aggregate
2006 AFC Champions League	Group A	(Kuwait) Al Qadisiya	6–0	0–2	4th
2006 AFC Champions League	Group A	(Syria) Al-Ittihad	1–2	0–0	4th
2006 AFC Champions League	Group A	(Uzbekistan) Pakhtakor	1–3	0–2	4th
2014 AFC Champions League	Group B	(Qatar) El Jaish	3–1	0–0	1st
2014 AFC Champions League	Group B	(Saudi Arabia) Al-Fateh	1–0	5–1	1st
2014 AFC Champions League	Group B	(Uzbekistan) Bunyodkor	1–0	1–1	1st
2014 AFC Champions League	R16	(Qatar) Al Sadd	0–0	2–2	2–2 (a)
2015 AFC Champions League	Group C	(Qatar) Al Sadd	0–0	0–1	3rd
2015 AFC Champions League	Group C	(Uzbekistan) Lokomotiv Tashkent	1–0	1–1	3rd
2015 AFC Champions League	Group C	(Saudi Arabia) Al-Hilal	0–0	0–2	3rd
2021 AFC Champions League	PR	(United Arab Emirates) Al-Ain	4–0		
2021 AFC Champions League	Group D	(Qatar) Al Sadd	0–1	1–1	4th
2021 AFC Champions League	Group D	(Jordan) Al-Wehdat	1–0	0–1	4th
2021 AFC Champions League	Group D	(Saudi Arabia) Al-Nassr	1–1	0–2	4th
2022 AFC Champions League	Group C	(Qatar) Al-Gharafa	1–0	0–0	1st
2022 AFC Champions League	Group C	(United Arab Emirates) Shabab Al-Ahli	1–1	1–1	1st
2022 AFC Champions League	Group C	(Turkmenistan) Ahal	1–0	1–0	1st
2022 AFC Champions League	R16	(Saudi Arabia) Al-Faisaly	1–0		
2022 AFC Champions League	QF	(Saudi Arabia) Al-Hilal	0–1		

=== Jonoob Ahvaz ===
Jonoob Ahvaz results
Season	Round	Opponent	Home	Away	Aggregate
1994–95 Asian Cup Winners' Cup	2R	(Kazakhstan) Taraz Club Dzhambul	1–0	0–1	1–1 (5–4 (p))
1994–95 Asian Cup Winners' Cup	QF	(United Arab Emirates) Al Shaab	1–1	0–0	1–1 (a)

=== Malavan ===
Malavan results
Season	Round	Opponent	Home	Away	Aggregate
1986 Asian Club Championship	Group 4	(Pakistan) HBL	7–0		?
1986 Asian Club Championship	Group 4	(Sri Lanka) Saunders	1–1		?
1986 Asian Club Championship	Group 4	(Maldives) Victory SC	12–0		?
1991–92 Asian Cup Winners' Cup	QF	(Jordan) Al Ramtha	1–1	0–0	1–1 (a)

=== Mes Kerman ===
Mes Kerman results
Season	Round	Opponent	Home	Away	Aggregate
2010 AFC Champions League	Group D	(United Arab Emirates) Al-Ahli	4–2	1–2	2nd
2010 AFC Champions League	Group D	(Saudi Arabia) Al-Hilal	3–1	1–3	2nd
2010 AFC Champions League	Group D	(Qatar) Al Sadd	3–1	1–4	2nd
2010 AFC Champions League	R16	(Iran) Zob Ahan	0–1		

=== Naft Tehran ===
Naft Tehran results
Season	Round	Opponent	Home	Away	Aggregate
2015 AFC Champions League	PR	(Qatar) El Jaish	1–0		
2015 AFC Champions League	Group B	(United Arab Emirates) Al-Ain	1–1	0–3	2nd
2015 AFC Champions League	Group B	(Saudi Arabia) Al-Shabab	2–1	3–0	2nd
2015 AFC Champions League	Group B	(Uzbekistan) Pakhtakor	1–1	1–2	2nd
2015 AFC Champions League	R16	(Saudi Arabia) Al-Ahli	1–0	1–2	2–2 (a)
2015 AFC Champions League	QF	(United Arab Emirates) Al-Ahli	0–1	1–2	1–3
2016 AFC Champions League	PR	(Qatar) El Jaish	0–2		

=== Nassaji Mazandaran ===
Nassaji Mazandaran results
Season	Round	Opponent	Home	Away	Aggregate
2023–24 AFC Champions League	Group D	(India) Mumbai City	2–0	2–0	3rd
2023–24 AFC Champions League	Group D	(Saudi Arabia) Al-Hilal	0–3	1–2	3rd
2023–24 AFC Champions League	Group D	(Uzbekistan) Navbahor	1–3	1–2	3rd

=== Pas ===
Pas results
Season	Round	Opponent	Home	Away	Aggregate
1992–93 Asian Club Championship	Group B	(United Arab Emirates) Al Wasl	0–1		2nd
1992–93 Asian Club Championship	Group B	(Pakistan) Wohaib	1–1		2nd
1992–93 Asian Club Championship	SF	(Japan) Yomiuri FC	2–1 (a.e.t.)		
1992–93 Asian Club Championship	Final	(Saudi Arabia) Al-Shabab	1–0		
1993–94 Asian Club Championship	PO	(Yemen) Al-Ahli	2–0	2–1	4–1
1993–94 Asian Club Championship	1R	(Lebanon) Al-Ansar	0–0	0–0 (a.e.t.)	0–0 (4–5 (p))
1998–99 Asian Cup Winners' Cup	1R	(Oman) Al-Seeb	10–1	0–2	10–3
1998–99 Asian Cup Winners' Cup	2R	(Iraq) Al-Talaba	0–1	1–1	1–2
2005 AFC Champions League	Group A	(Qatar) Al-Rayyan	2–1	2–1	1st
2005 AFC Champions League	Group A	(Iraq) Al-Shorta	1–0	1–1	1st
2005 AFC Champions League	Group A	(Kuwait) Al-Salmiya	1–0	5–1	1st
2005 AFC Champions League	QF	(United Arab Emirates) Al-Ain	1–1	3–3	4–4 (a)

=== Persepolis ===
Persepolis results
Season	Round	Opponent	Home	Away	Aggregate
1969 Asian Champion Club Tournament	Group B	(Japan) Toyo Kogyo	0–1		3rd
1969 Asian Champion Club Tournament	Group B	(Malaysia) Perak FA	4–2		3rd
1969 Asian Champion Club Tournament	Group B	(Hong Kong) Kowloon Motor Bus	4–0		3rd
1969 Asian Champion Club Tournament	Group B	(Israel) Maccabi Tel Aviv	0–0		3rd
1988–89 Asian Club Championship	Group 4	(Sri Lanka) Saunders SC	5–0		2nd
1988–89 Asian Club Championship	Group 4	(Bangladesh) Mohammedan SC	1–2		2nd
1990–91 Asian Cup Winners' Cup	1R	(Pakistan) Punjab	9–0	4–2	13–2
1990–91 Asian Cup Winners' Cup	2R	(South Korea) Daewoo Royals	(w/o)		
1990–91 Asian Cup Winners' Cup	SF	(Saudi Arabia) Al-Hilal	1–0	0–0	1–0
1990–91 Asian Cup Winners' Cup	Final	(Bahrain) Muharraq	1–0	0–0	1–0
1992–93 Asian Cup Winners' Cup	1R	(Lebanon) Safa	(w/o)		
1992–93 Asian Cup Winners' Cup	IR	(Oman) Fanja	2–0	0–0	2–0
1992–93 Asian Cup Winners' Cup	SF	(Saudi Arabia) Al-Ittihad	1–0	1–1	2–1
1992–93 Asian Cup Winners' Cup	Final	(Japan) Yokohama Marinos	0–1	1–1	1–2
1993–94 Asian Cup Winners' Cup	1R	(Jordan) Al Salmiya	0–1	2–1	2–2 (a)
1993–94 Asian Cup Winners' Cup	QF	(Qatar) Al Arabi	1–1	1–2	2–3
1996–97 Asian Club Championship	2R	(Kazakhstan) Yelimay Semipalatinsk	5–0	0–3	5–3
1996–97 Asian Club Championship	QF	(Iraq) Al-Zawraa	2–1		1st
1996–97 Asian Club Championship	QF	(Saudi Arabia) Al-Nassr	2–3		1st
1996–97 Asian Club Championship	QF	(Qatar) Al-Rayyan	2–1		1st
1996–97 Asian Club Championship	SF	(South Korea) Pohang Steelers	1–3		
1996–97 Asian Club Championship	3PPO	(Iraq) Al-Zawraa	4–1		
1997–98 Asian Club Championship	2R	(Iraq) Al-Zawraa	2–0	0–0	2–0
1997–98 Asian Club Championship	QF	(Saudi Arabia) Al-Hilal	1–0		1st
1997–98 Asian Club Championship	QF	(Lebanon) Al-Ansar	1–0		1st
1997–98 Asian Club Championship	QF	(Uzbekistan) Navbahor Namangan	1–1		1st
1997–98 Asian Club Championship	SF	(China) Dalian Wanda	0–2		
1997–98 Asian Club Championship	3PPO	(Saudi Arabia) Al-Hilal	1–4		
1999–2000 Asian Club Championship	2R	(Lebanon) Al-Ansar	3–0	0–0	3–0
1999–2000 Asian Club Championship	QF	(Iraq) Al-Shorta	0–0		2nd
1999–2000 Asian Club Championship	QF	(Kazakhstan) FC Irtysh	1–0		2nd
1999–2000 Asian Club Championship	QF	(Saudi Arabia) Al-Hilal	0–0		2nd
1999–2000 Asian Club Championship	SF	(Japan) Júbilo Iwata	0–2		
1999–2000 Asian Club Championship	3PPO	(South Korea) Suwon Samsung Bluewings	1–0		
2000–01 Asian Club Championship	1R	(Qatar) Al-Wakrah	5–1	4–2	9–3
2000–01 Asian Club Championship	2R	(United Arab Emirates) Al-Ain	2–0	2–2 (a.e.t.)	4–2
2000–01 Asian Club Championship	QF	(Saudi Arabia) Al-Ittihad	0–0		1st
2000–01 Asian Club Championship	QF	(Kazakhstan) FC Irtysh	0–0		1st
2000–01 Asian Club Championship	QF	(Saudi Arabia) Al-Hilal	3–1		1st
2000–01 Asian Club Championship	SF	(South Korea) Suwon Samsung Bluewings	1–2		
2000–01 Asian Club Championship	3PPO	(Kazakhstan) FC Irtysh	2–0		
2002–03 AFC Champions League	Group C	(Iraq) Al-Talaba	1–0		2nd
2002–03 AFC Champions League	Group C	(Uzbekistan) Pakhtakor	0–1		2nd
2002–03 AFC Champions League	Group C	(Turkmenistan) Nisa Asgabat	4–1		2nd
2009 AFC Champions League	Group B	(Saudi Arabia) Al-Shabab	1–0	0–0	1st
2009 AFC Champions League	Group B	(Qatar) Al-Gharafa	3–1	1–5	1st
2009 AFC Champions League	R16	(Uzbekistan) Bunyodkor	0–1		
2011 AFC Champions League	Group C	(United Arab Emirates) Al-Wahda	1–1	0–2	4th
2011 AFC Champions League	Group C	(Uzbekistan) Bunyodkor	1–3	0–0	4th
2011 AFC Champions League	Group C	(Saudi Arabia) Al-Ittihad	3–2	1–3	4th
2012 AFC Champions League	Group D	(Saudi Arabia) Al-Hilal	0–1	1–1	2nd
2012 AFC Champions League	Group D	(United Arab Emirates) Al-Shabab	6–1	3–1	2nd
2012 AFC Champions League	Group D	(Qatar) Al-Gharafa	1–1	3–0	2nd
2012 AFC Champions League	R16	(Saudi Arabia) Al-Ittihad	0–3		
2017 AFC Champions League	Group D	(Saudi Arabia) Al-Hilal	1–1	0–0	2nd
2017 AFC Champions League	Group D	(United Arab Emirates) Al-Wahda	4–2	3–2	2nd
2017 AFC Champions League	Group D	(Qatar) Al-Rayyan	0–0	1–3	2nd
2017 AFC Champions League	R16	(Qatar) Lekhwiya	1–0	1–0	2–0
2017 AFC Champions League	QF	(Saudi Arabia) Al-Ahli	2–2	3–1	5–3
2017 AFC Champions League	SF	(Saudi Arabia) Al-Hilal	2–2	0–4	2–6
2018 AFC Champions League	Group C	(Uzbekistan) Nasaf Qarshi	3–0	0–0	1st
2018 AFC Champions League	Group C	(Qatar) Al Sadd	2–1	1–3	1st
2018 AFC Champions League	Group C	(United Arab Emirates) Al-Wasl	2–0	1–0	1st
2018 AFC Champions League	R16	(United Arab Emirates) Al-Jazira	2–1	2–3	4–4 (a)
2018 AFC Champions League	QF	(Qatar) Al-Duhail	3–1	0–1	3–2
2018 AFC Champions League	SF	(Qatar) Al Sadd	1–1	1–0	2–1
2018 AFC Champions League	Final	(Japan) Kashima Antlers	0–0	0–2	0–2
2019 AFC Champions League	Group D	(Uzbekistan) Pakhtakor	1–1	1–2	4th
2019 AFC Champions League	Group D	(Saudi Arabia) Al-Ahli	2–0	1–2	4th
2019 AFC Champions League	Group D	(Qatar) Al Sadd	2–0	0–1	4th
2020 AFC Champions League	Group C	(Qatar) Al-Duhail	0–1	0–2	1st
2020 AFC Champions League	Group C	(United Arab Emirates) Sharjah	4–0	2–2	1st
2020 AFC Champions League	Group C	(Saudi Arabia) Al-Taawoun	1–0	1–0	1st
2020 AFC Champions League	R16	(Qatar) Al Sadd	1–0		
2020 AFC Champions League	QF	(Uzbekistan) Pakhtakor	2–0		
2020 AFC Champions League	SF	(Saudi Arabia) Al-Nassr	1–1 (a.e.t.) (5–3 ((p))		
2020 AFC Champions League	Final	(South Korea) Ulsan Hyundai	1–2		
2021 AFC Champions League	Group E	(United Arab Emirates) Al-Wahda	1–0	0–1	1st
2021 AFC Champions League	Group E	(Qatar) Al-Rayyan	4–2	3–1	1st
2021 AFC Champions League	Group E	(India) Goa	2–1	4–0	1st
2021 AFC Champions League	R16	(Tajikistan) Istiklol	1–0		
2021 AFC Champions League	QF	(Saudi Arabia) Al-Hilal	0–3		
2023–24 AFC Champions League	Group E	(Saudi Arabia) Al-Nassr	0–2	0–0	2nd
2023–24 AFC Champions League	Group E	(Qatar) Al-Duhail	1–2	1–0	2nd
2023–24 AFC Champions League	Group E	(Tajikistan) Istiklol	2–0	1–1	2nd
2024–25 AFC Champions League Elite	League Stage	(Saudi Arabia) Al-Ahli	—N/a	0–1	9th
2024–25 AFC Champions League Elite	League Stage	(Uzbekistan) Pakhtakor	0–0	—N/a	9th
2024–25 AFC Champions League Elite	League Stage	(Qatar) Al Sadd	—N/a	0–1	9th
2024–25 AFC Champions League Elite	League Stage	(Qatar) Al-Gharafa	1–1	—N/a	9th
2024–25 AFC Champions League Elite	League Stage	(Qatar) Al-Rayyan	—N/a	1–1	9th
2024–25 AFC Champions League Elite	League Stage	(Iraq) Al-Shorta	2–1	—N/a	9th
2024–25 AFC Champions League Elite	League Stage	(Saudi Arabia) Al-Hilal	—N/a	1–4	9th
2024–25 AFC Champions League Elite	League Stage	(Saudi Arabia) Al-Nassr	0–0	—N/a	9th

=== Saba Qom ===
Saba Qom results
Season	Round	Opponent	Home	Away	Aggregate
2006 AFC Champions League	Group C	(Qatar) Al-Gharafa	4–1	2–0	2nd
2006 AFC Champions League	Group C	(Syria) Al-Karamah	1–2	0–1	2nd
2006 AFC Champions League	Group C	(United Arab Emirates) Al-Wahda	2–2	4–2	2nd
2009 AFC Champions League	Group A	(United Arab Emirates) Al-Ahli	0–0	5–3	3rd
2009 AFC Champions League	Group A	(Uzbekistan) Pakhtakor	1–2	0–2	3rd
2009 AFC Champions League	Group A	(Saudi Arabia) Al-Hilal	0–1	1–1	3rd
2013 AFC Champions League	PO	(United Arab Emirates) Al-Shabab Al-Arabi	1–1 (a.e.t.) (3–5 ((p))		

=== Saipa ===
Saipa results
Season	Round	Opponent	Home	Away	Aggregate
1994–95 Asian Club Championship	2R	(Uzbekistan) FK Neftchy Farg'ona	2–2	1–1	3–3 (a)
1995 Asian Club Championship	2R	(Kuwait) Al-Salmiya	2–1	2–1	4–2
1995 Asian Club Championship	QF	(Turkmenistan) Köpetdag Aşgabat	1–0		2nd
1995 Asian Club Championship	QF	(Saudi Arabia) Al-Nassr	0–0		2nd
1995 Asian Club Championship	QF	(Qatar) Al-Arabi	0–0		2nd
1995 Asian Club Championship	SF	(South Korea) Ilhwa Chunma	0–1 (a.s.d.e.t.)		
1995 Asian Club Championship	3PPO	(Thailand) Thai Farmers Bank	1–2		
2008 AFC Champions League	Group B	Al Kuwait	1–0	1–1	1st
2008 AFC Champions League	Group B	(United Arab Emirates) Al-Wasl	2–0	1–1	1st
2008 AFC Champions League	Group B	(Iraq) Al-Quwa Al-Jawiya	1–1	1–0	1st
2008 AFC Champions League	QF	(Uzbekistan) Bunyodkor	2–2	1–5	3–7
2019 AFC Champions League	PR2	(India) Minerva Punjab	4–0		
2019 AFC Champions League	PO	(Qatar) Al-Rayyan	1–3		

=== Sepahan ===
Sepahan results					
Season	Round	Opponent	Home	Away	Aggregate
2004 AFC Champions League	Group D	(Uzbekistan) Neftchi	4–0	3–1	2nd
2004 AFC Champions League	Group D	(Kuwait) Al Arabi	3–1	2–2	2nd
2004 AFC Champions League	Group D	(Saudi Arabia) Al-Ittihad	0–4	3–2	2nd
2005 AFC Champions League	Group B	(Saudi Arabia) Al-Shabab	1–0	1–1	2nd
2005 AFC Champions League	Group B	(United Arab Emirates) Al-Ain	1–1	2–3	2nd
2005 AFC Champions League	Group B	(United Arab Emirates) Al-Wahda	2–0	3–1	2nd
2007 AFC Champions League	Group D	(Syria) Al-Ittihad	2–1	5–0	1st
2007 AFC Champions League	Group D	(Saudi Arabia) Al-Shabab	1–0	1–0	1st
2007 AFC Champions League	Group D	(United Arab Emirates) Al-Ain	1–1	2–3	1st
2007 AFC Champions League	QF	(Japan) Kawasaki Frontale	0–0	0–0 (a.e.t.)	0–0 (5–4 (p))
2007 AFC Champions League	SF	(United Arab Emirates) Al-Wahda	3–1	0–0	3–1
2007 AFC Champions League	Final	(Japan) Urawa Red Diamonds	1–1	0–2	1–3
2008 AFC Champions League	Group A	(Syria) Al-Ittihad	0–2	1–2	3rd
2008 AFC Champions League	Group A	(Uzbekistan) Bunyodkor	1–1	0–2	3rd
2008 AFC Champions League	Group A	(Saudi Arabia) Al-Ittihad	2–1	1–0	3rd
2009 AFC Champions League	Group D	(United Arab Emirates) Al-Shabab Al-Arabi	2–0	1–2	3rd
2009 AFC Champions League	Group D	(Saudi Arabia) Al-Ettifaq	3–0	1–2	3rd
2009 AFC Champions League	Group D	(Uzbekistan) Bunyodkor	0–1	2–2	3rd
2010 AFC Champions League	Group C	(Saudi Arabia) Al-Shabab	1–0	1–1	3rd
2010 AFC Champions League	Group C	(United Arab Emirates) Al-Ain	0–0	0–2	3rd
2010 AFC Champions League	Group C	(Uzbekistan) Pakhtakor	2–0	1–2	3rd
2011 AFC Champions League	Group A	(Saudi Arabia) Al-Hilal	1–1	2–1	1st
2011 AFC Champions League	Group A	(United Arab Emirates) Al-Jazira	5–1	4–1	1st
2011 AFC Champions League	Group A	(Qatar) Al-Gharafa	2–0	0–1	1st
2011 AFC Champions League	R16	(Uzbekistan) Bunyodkor	3–1		
2011 AFC Champions League	QF	(Qatar) Al Sadd	0–3 awd.	2–1	2–4
2012 AFC Champions League	Group C	(United Arab Emirates) Al-Nasr	1–0	3–0	1st
2012 AFC Champions League	Group C	(Saudi Arabia) Al-Ahli	2–1	1–1	1st
2012 AFC Champions League	Group C	(Qatar) Lekhwiya	2–1	0–1	1st
2012 AFC Champions League	R16	(Iran) Esteghlal	2–0		
2012 AFC Champions League	QF	(Saudi Arabia) Al-Ahli	0–0	1–4	1–4
2013 AFC Champions League	Group C	(United Arab Emirates) Al-Nasr	3–0	2–1	3rd
2013 AFC Champions League	Group C	(Qatar) Al-Gharafa	3–1	1–3	3rd
2013 AFC Champions League	Group C	(Saudi Arabia) Al-Ahli	2–4	1–4	3rd
2014 AFC Champions League	Group D	(Qatar) Al Sadd	4–0	1–3	4th
2014 AFC Champions League	Group D	(Saudi Arabia) Al-Hilal	3–2	0–1	4th
2014 AFC Champions League	Group D	(United Arab Emirates) Al-Ahli	1–2	0–0	4th
2020 AFC Champions League	Group D	(United Arab Emirates) Al-Ain	0–0	4–0	3rd
2020 AFC Champions League	Group D	(Saudi Arabia) Al-Nassr	0–2	0–2	3rd
2020 AFC Champions League	Group D	(Qatar) Al Sadd	2–1	0–3	3rd
2022 AFC Champions League	Group D	(Uzbekistan) Pakhtakor	2–1	3–1	3rd
2022 AFC Champions League	Group D	(Qatar) Al-Duhail	0–1	2–5	3rd
2022 AFC Champions League	Group D	(Saudi Arabia) Al-Taawoun	1–1	0–3	3rd
2023–24 AFC Champions League	Group C	(Iraq) Al-Quwa Al-Jawiya	1–0	2–2	2nd
2023–24 AFC Champions League	Group C	(Saudi Arabia) Al-Ittihad	0–3 awd.	1–2	2nd
2023–24 AFC Champions League	Group C	(Uzbekistan) AGMK	9–0	3–1	2nd
2023–24 AFC Champions League	R16	(Saudi Arabia) Al-Hilal	1–3	1–3	2–6
2024–25 AFC Champions League Elite	PR2	(United Arab Emirates) Shabab Al-Ahli	1–4 (a.e.t.)		
2024–25 AFC Champions League Two	Group C	(Jordan) Al-Wehdat	1–1	1–2	3rd
2024–25 AFC Champions League Two	Group C	(Tajikistan) Istiklol	4–0	2–0	3rd
2024–25 AFC Champions League Two	Group C	(United Arab Emirates) Sharjah	3–1	1–3	3rd
2025–26 AFC Champions League Elite	PO	(Qatar) Al-Duhail	2–3		
2025–26 AFC Champions League Two	Group C	(Jordan) Al-Hussein	2–0	0–1	2nd
2025–26 AFC Champions League Two	Group C	(India) Mohun Bagan	Cancelled	Cancelled	2nd
2025–26 AFC Champions League Two	Group C	(Turkmenistan) Ahal	2–2	1–0	2nd
2025–26 AFC Champions League Two	R16	(Qatar) Al Ahli	2–2	0–1 (a.e.t.)	2–3

=== Shahr Khodro ===
Shahin Ahvaz results
Season	Round	Opponent	Home	Away	Aggregate
2020 AFC Champions League	PR2	(Bahrain) Al-Riffa	2–1		
2020 AFC Champions League	PO	(Qatar) Al-Sailiya	0–0 (5–4 (p))		
2020 AFC Champions League	Group B	(Uzbekistan) Pakhtakor	0–1	0–3	3rd
2020 AFC Champions League	Group B	(United Arab Emirates) Shabab Al-Ahli	0–1	0–1	3rd

=== Shahin Ahvaz ===
Shahr Khodro results
Season	Round	Opponent	Home	Away	Aggregate
1989–90 Asian Club Championship	Group 4	(Maldives) Victory SC	5–0		1st
1989–90 Asian Club Championship	Group 4	(Sri Lanka) Old Benedictans	5–0		1st
1989–90 Asian Club Championship	Group 4	(Bangladesh) Mohammedan SC	1–0		1st
1989–90 Asian Club Championship	Group B	(China) Liaoning	0–2		3rd
1989–90 Asian Club Championship	Group B	(Iraq) Al-Rasheed	0–5		3rd
1989–90 Asian Club Championship	Group B	(Indonesia) Pelita Jaya	2–0		3rd

=== Tractor ===
Tractor results
Season	Round	Opponent	Home	Away	Aggregate
2013 AFC Champions League	Group A	(United Arab Emirates) Al-Jazira	3–1	0–2	4th
2013 AFC Champions League	Group A	(Qatar) El Jaish	2–4	3–3	4th
2013 AFC Champions League	Group A	(Saudi Arabia) Al-Shabab	0–1	0–1	4th
2014 AFC Champions League	Group C	(Saudi Arabia) Al-Ittihad	1–0	0–2	4th
2014 AFC Champions League	Group C	(Qatar) Lekhwiya	0–1	0–0	4th
2014 AFC Champions League	Group C	(United Arab Emirates) Al-Ain	2–2	1–3	4th
2015 AFC Champions League	Group D	(Uzbekistan) Nasaf Qarshi	1–2	1–2	4th
2015 AFC Champions League	Group D	(United Arab Emirates) Al-Ahli	1–0	2–3	4th
2015 AFC Champions League	Group D	(Saudi Arabia) Al-Ahli	2–2	0–2	4th
2016 AFC Champions League	Group C	(United Arab Emirates) Al-Jazira	4–0	1–0	1st
2016 AFC Champions League	Group C	(Uzbekistan) Pakhtakor	2–0	0–1	1st
2016 AFC Champions League	Group C	(Saudi Arabia) Al-Hilal	1–2	2–0	1st
2016 AFC Champions League	R16	(United Arab Emirates) Al-Nasr	3–1	1–4	4–5
2018 AFC Champions League	Group A	(Saudi Arabia) Al-Ahli	0–1	0–2	4th
2018 AFC Champions League	Group A	(Qatar) Al-Gharafa	1–3	0–3	4th
2018 AFC Champions League	Group A	(United Arab Emirates) Al-Jazira	1–1	0–0	4th
2021 AFC Champions League	Group B	(Uzbekistan) Pakhtakor	0–0	3–3	2nd
2021 AFC Champions League	Group B	(United Arab Emirates) Sharjah	0–0	2–0	2nd
2021 AFC Champions League	Group B	(Iraq) Al-Quwa Al-Jawiya	1–0	0–0	2nd
2021 AFC Champions League	R16	(Saudi Arabia) Al-Nassr	0–1		
2023–24 AFC Champions League	PO	(United Arab Emirates) Sharjah	1–3		
2024–25 AFC Champions League Two	Group A	(Qatar) Al-Wakrah	3–3	3–0	1st
2024–25 AFC Champions League Two	Group A	(Tajikistan) Ravshan Kulob	7–0	3–1	1st
2024–25 AFC Champions League Two	R16	(Bahrain) Al-Khaldiya	3–3	2–1	5–4
2024–25 AFC Champions League Two	QF	(Saudi Arabia) Al Taawoun	0–0	2–2 (a.e.t.)	2–2 (2–4 (p))
2025–26 AFC Champions League Elite	League stage	(United Arab Emirates) Shabab Al Ahli	—N/a	1–1	3rd
2025–26 AFC Champions League Elite	League stage	(United Arab Emirates) Al Wahda	0–0	—N/a	3rd
2025–26 AFC Champions League Elite	League stage	(United Arab Emirates) Sharjah	—N/a	5–0	3rd
2025–26 AFC Champions League Elite	League stage	(Iraq) Al-Shorta	1–0	—N/a	3rd
2025–26 AFC Champions League Elite	League stage	(Uzbekistan) Nasaf	—N/a	1–0	3rd
2025–26 AFC Champions League Elite	League stage	(Qatar) Al-Duhail	2–1	—N/a	3rd
2025–26 AFC Champions League Elite	League stage	(Qatar) Al Sadd	0–2	—N/a	3rd
2025–26 AFC Champions League Elite	League stage	(Qatar) Al-Gharafa	—N/a	2–0	3rd
2025–26 AFC Champions League Elite	R16	(United Arab Emirates) Shabab Al Ahli	0–3		

=== Zob Ahan ===
Zob Ahan results
Season	Round	Opponent	Home	Away	Aggregate
2004 AFC Champions League	Group A	(Uzbekistan) Pakhtakor	1–0	0–2	2nd
2004 AFC Champions League	Group A	Qatar SC	3–3	0–0	2nd
2010 AFC Champions League	Group B	(United Arab Emirates) Al-Wahda	1–0	0–1	1st
2010 AFC Champions League	Group B	(Saudi Arabia) Al-Ittihad	1–0	2–2	1st
2010 AFC Champions League	Group B	(Uzbekistan) Bunyodkor	3–0	1–0	1st
2010 AFC Champions League	R16	(Iran) Mes Kerman	1–0		
2010 AFC Champions League	QF	(South Korea) Pohang Steelers	2–1	1–1	3–1
2010 AFC Champions League	SF	(Saudi Arabia) Al-Hilal	1–0	1–0	2–0
2010 AFC Champions League	Final	(South Korea) Seongnam Ilhwa Chunma	1–3		
2011 AFC Champions League	Group D	(United Arab Emirates) Emirates	2–1	1–0	1st
2011 AFC Champions League	Group D	(Saudi Arabia) Al-Shabab	0–1	0–0	1st
2011 AFC Champions League	Group D	(Qatar) Al-Rayyan	1–0	3–1	1st
2011 AFC Champions League	R16	(Saudi Arabia) Al-Nassr	4–1		
2011 AFC Champions League	QF	(South Korea) Suwon Samsung Bluewings	1–2	1–1	2–3
2012 AFC Champions League	PO	(Iran) Esteghlal	0–2		
2017 AFC Champions League	Group C	(United Arab Emirates) Al-Ain	0–3	1–1	3rd
2017 AFC Champions League	Group C	(Saudi Arabia) Al-Ahli	1–2	0–2	3rd
2017 AFC Champions League	Group C	(Uzbekistan) Bunyodkor	2–1	2–0	3rd
2018 AFC Champions League	PO	(India) Aizawl	3–1		
2018 AFC Champions League	Group B	(Qatar) Al-Duhail	0–1	1–3	2nd
2018 AFC Champions League	Group B	(Uzbekistan) Lokomotiv Tashkent	2–0	1–1	2nd
2018 AFC Champions League	Group B	(United Arab Emirates) Al-Wahda	2–0	0–3	2nd
2018 AFC Champions League	R16	(Iran) Esteghlal	1–0	1–3	2–3
2019 AFC Champions League	PR2	Al Kuwait	1–0		
2019 AFC Champions League	PO	(Qatar) Al-Gharafa	3–2		
2019 AFC Champions League	Group A	(Iraq) Al-Zawraa	0–0	2–2	1st
2019 AFC Champions League	Group A	(Saudi Arabia) Al-Nassr	0–0	3–2	1st
2019 AFC Champions League	Group A	(United Arab Emirates) Al-Wasl	2–0	3–1	1st
2019 AFC Champions League	R16	(Saudi Arabia) Al-Ittihad	3–4	1–2	4–6

== Statistics by opponents league ==
=== Bahrain ===
Against Bahraini Premier League clubs
Team	Pld	W	D	L	GF	GA	GD	Pts
Shahr Khodro	1	1	0	0	2	1	+1	3
Tractor	2	1	1	0	5	4	+4	4
Total	3	2	1	0	7	5	+5	7

=== India ===
Against Indian Super League clubs
Team	Pld	W	D	L	GF	GA	GD	Pts
Nassaji Mazandaran	2	2	0	0	4	0	+4	6
Persepolis	2	2	0	0	6	1	+5	6
Saipa	1	1	0	0	4	0	+4	3
Zob Ahan	1	1	0	0	3	1	+2	3
Total	6	6	0	0	17	2	+15	18

=== Iran ===
Against Persian Gulf Pro League clubs
Team	Pld	W	D	L	GF	GA	GD	Pts
Esteghlal	4	2	0	2	5	4	+1	6
Mes Kerman	1	0	0	1	0	1	−1	0
Sepahan	1	1	0	0	2	0	+2	3
Zob Ahan	4	2	0	2	3	5	−2	6
Total	10	5	0	5	10	10	0	15

=== Iraq ===
Against Iraq Stars League clubs
Team	Pld	W	D	L	GF	GA	GD	Pts
Esteghlal	4	2	2	0	6	2	+4	8
Pas	2	1	1	0	2	1	+1	4
Persepolis	1	1	0	0	1	0	+1	3
Saba Qom	2	0	0	2	1	3	−2	0
Saipa	2	1	1	0	2	1	+1	4
Sepahan	2	1	1	0	3	2	+1	4
Tractor Sazi	2	1	1	0	1	0	+1	4
Zob Ahan	2	0	2	0	2	2	0	2
Total	17	7	8	2	18	11	+7	29

=== Japan ===
Against J1 League clubs
Team	Pld	W	D	L	GF	GA	GD	Pts
Persepolis	2	0	1	1	0	2	−2	1
Sepahan	4	0	3	1	1	3	−2	3
Total	6	0	4	2	1	5	−4	4

=== Jordan ===
Against Jordanian Pro League clubs
Team	Pld	W	D	L	GF	GA	GD	Pts
Foolad	2	1	0	1	1	2	−1	3
Sepahan	1	0	0	1	1	3	−2	0
Total	3	1	0	2	2	5	−3	3

=== Kuwait ===
Against Kuwait Premier League clubs
Team	Pld	W	D	L	GF	GA	GD	Pts
Esteghlal	1	1	0	0	4	0	+3	3
Foolad	2	0	0	2	0	4	−4	0
Pas	2	2	0	0	6	1	+5	6
Saipa	2	1	1	0	2	1	+1	4
Sepahan	2	1	1	0	5	3	+2	4
Zob Ahan	1	1	0	0	1	0	+1	3
Total	10	6	2	2	18	9	+9	20

=== Qatar ===
Against Qatar Stars League clubs
Team	Pld	W	D	L	GF	GA	GD	Pts
Esteghlal	25	8	10	7	44	33	+11	34
Esteghlal Khuzestan	2	0	1	1	1	3	−2	1
Foolad	7	1	4	2	4	7	−3	7
Mes Kerman	6	2	1	3	8	10	−2	7
Naft Tehran	4	2	0	2	3	6	−3	6
Pas	2	2	0	0	4	2	+2	6
Persepolis	25	11	7	7	25	21	+4	40
Saba Qom	2	2	0	0	6	1	+5	6
Saipa	1	0	0	1	1	3	−2	0
Sepahan	14	6	0	8	19	24	−5	18
Shahr Khodro	1	0	1	0	0	0	0	1
Tractor Sazi	7	1	2	4	9	14	−5	5
Zob Ahan	7	3	2	2	11	10	+1	11
Total	103	38	28	37	135	134	+1	142

=== Saudi Arabia ===
Against Saudi Professional League clubs
Team	Pld	W	D	L	GF	GA	GD	Pts
Esteghlal	25	11	1	13	41	38	+3	34
Esteghlal Khuzestan	4	1	1	2	4	7	−3	4
Foolad	9	3	2	4	7	11	−4	11
Mes Kerman	6	2	0	4	7	14	−7	6
Naft Tehran	4	2	0	2	7	5	+2	6
Nassaji Mazandaran	2	0	0	2	1	5	−4	0
Persepolis	22	6	8	8	20	29	−9	26
Saba Qom	2	0	1	1	1	2	−1	1
Sepahan	30	11	6	13	33	49	−16	39
Tractor Sazi	11	2	1	8	6	14	−8	7
Zob Ahan	13	5	3	5	17	16	+1	18
Total	128	43	23	62	144	185	−46	152

=== South Korea ===
Against K League clubs
Team	Pld	W	D	L	GF	GA	GD	Pts
Esteghlal	2	0	1	1	2	4	−2	1
Persepolis	1	0	0	1	1	2	−1	0
Zob Ahan	3	1	1	1	4	5	−1	4
Total	6	1	2	3	7	11	−4	5

=== Syria ===
Against Syrian Premier League clubs
Team	Pld	W	D	L	GF	GA	GD	Pts
Foolad	2	1	1	0	1	1	0	4
Sepahan	4	2	0	2	8	5	+3	6
Total	6	3	1	2	9	6	+3	1

=== Tajikistan ===
Against Tajikistan Higher League clubs
Team	Pld	W	D	L	GF	GA	GD	Pts
Persepolis	3	2	1	0	4	1	+3	7
Sepahan	1	1	0	0	4	0	+4	3
Tractor Sazi	2	2	0	0	10	1	+9	6
Total	6	5	1	0	18	2	+16	16

=== Thailand ===
Against Thai League 1 clubs
Team	Pld	W	D	L	GF	GA	GD	Pts
Esteghlal	2	2	0	0	3	1	+2	6
Total	2	2	0	0	3	1	+2	6

=== Turkmenistan ===
Against Ýokary Liga clubs
Team	Pld	W	D	L	GF	GA	GD	Pts
Foolad	2	2	0	0	2	0	+2	6
Persepolis	1	1	0	0	4	1	+3	3
Total	3	3	0	0	6	1	+5	9

=== United Arab Emirates ===
Against UAE Pro League clubs
Team	Pld	W	D	L	GF	GA	GD	Pts
Esteghlal	21	7	8	6	27	28	−1	29
Esteghlal Khuzestan	2	1	1	0	2	1	+1	4
Foolad	6	2	3	1	11	8	+3	9
Mes Kerman	5	2	0	3	9	10	−1	6
Naft Tehran	4	2	1	1	5	5	0	7
Pas	2	0	2	0	4	4	0	2
Persepolis	14	9	2	3	31	16	+15	29
Saba Qom	5	2	3	0	12	8	+4	9
Saipa	2	1	1	0	3	1	+2	4
Sepahan	25	12	6	7	45	23	+22	42
Shahr Khodro	2	0	0	2	0	2	−2	0
Tractor Sazi	15	6	4	5	22	20	+2	22
Zob Ahan	10	6	1	3	12	10	+2	19
Total	113	50	32	31	183	136	47	182

=== Uzbekistan ===
Against Uzbekistan Super League clubs
Team	Pld	W	D	L	GF	GA	GD	Pts
Esteghlal	7	4	2	1	13	6	+7	14
Foolad	7	2	3	2	10	9	+1	9
Naft Tehran	2	1	1	0	3	2	+1	4
Nassaji Mazandaran	2	0	0	2	2	5	−2	0
Persepolis	9	2	4	4	9	9	0	10
Saba Qom	2	0	0	2	1	4	−3	0
Saipa	2	0	1	1	3	7	−4	1
Sepahan	13	8	2	3	33	13	+20	20
Shahr Khodro	2	0	0	2	0	4	−4	0
Tractor Sazi	6	1	2	3	7	8	−1	5
Zob Ahan	8	6	1	1	12	4	+8	19
Total	60	24	16	21	93	71	+22	82

== Finals ==
Performance by clubs
Club	Winners	Runners-up	Years won	Years runners-up
Persepolis	0	2		2018, 2020
Sepahan	0	1		2007
Zob Ahan	0	1		2010

== Top scorers ==
Bold Active in Iranian league teams

Footballer	Club	2002-03	2004	2005	2006	2007	2008	2009	2010	2011	2012	2013	2014	2015	2016	2017	2018	2019	2020	2021	2022	2023–24	Total
(Iran) Ali Alipour	Persepolis																5	3	2				10
(Iran) Morteza Tabrizi	Zob Ahan Esteghlal														1	2	5	1					9
(Iran) Mehdi Taremi	Persepolis													1		7							8
(Iran) Kaveh Rezaei	Zob Ahan Esteghlal														2	6							8
(Nigeria) Godwin Mensha	Persepolis															4	3						7
(Senegal) Mame Baba Thiam	Esteghlal																7						7
(Iran) Issa Alekasir	Persepolis																		4	2			6
(Mali) Cheick Diabate	Esteghlal																		1	5			6

== FIFA Club World Cup ==
Season	Teams	Pld	W	D	L	GF	GA	GD	Points
2007	1	2	1	0	1	4	4	0	3
Total	1	2	1	0	1	4	4	0	3

== Asian Club Championships (1967-2002) ==
Season	Teams	Pld	W	D	L	GF	GA	GD	Points
Asian Champion Club Tournament
1969	1	4	2	0	2	9	6	+3	4
1970	1	3	4	0	0	10	1	+9	8
1971	1	3	3	1	1	8	5	+3	7
Asian Club Championship
1986	1	3	2	1	0	20	1	+19	5
1988–89	1	2	1	0	1	6	4	+2	2
1989–90	1	6	4	0	2	13	7	+6	8
1990–91	1	8	6	2	0	11	4	+7	15
1991	1	6	2	3	1	8	4	+4	7
1992–93	1	5	2	1	2	8	6	+2	5
1993–94	1	2	2	2	0	4	1	+3	6
1994–95	1	2	0	2	0	3	3	0	2
1995	1	7	3	2	2	6	5	+1	11
1996–97	1	9	5	1	3	17	12	+5	16
1997–98	1	7	3	2	2	6	7	−1	11
1998–99	1	7	4	1	2	11	8	+3	13
1999–2000	1	7	3	3	1	5	2	+3	12
2000–01	1	9	5	3	1	19	8	+11	18
2001–02	1	7	4	1	2	19	12	+7	10
Total	18	97	55	25	22	183	96	+87	160

== Afro-Asian Club Championship ==
Season	Teams	Pld	W	D	L	GF	GA	GD	Points
1993	1	2	0	1	1	0	2	−2	1
Total	1	2	0	1	1	0	2	−2	1

== Asian Cup Winners' Cup ==
Season	Teams	Pld	W	D	L	GF	GA	GD	Points
1990–91	1	2	4	2	0	15	2	+13	10
1991–92	1	2	0	2	0	1	1	0	2
1992–93	1	8	3	4	1	8	5	+3	10
1993–94	1	4	1	1	2	4	5	−1	3
1994–95	1	4	1	2	1	2	2	0	5
1995	1	4	1	2	1	4	4	0	5
1996–97	1	6	2	2	2	6	6	0	8
1997–98	1	2	0	1	1	2	3	−1	1
1998–99	1	4	1	1	2	11	5	+6	4
1999–2000	1	4	2	1	1	16	2	+14	7
2000–01	1	8	4	1	3	15	10	+5	13
2001–02	1	2	0	2	0	2	2	0	2
Total	12	50	19	21	14	86	47	+39	70

== AFC Women's Club Championship ==
- 2021 AFC Women's Club Championship
- 2022 AFC Women's Club Championship
- 2023 AFC Women's Club Championship

== AFC Women's Champions League ==
- 2024–25 AFC Women's Champions League
