= Mehdi Haj Mohamad =

Iranian footballer (1950–2025)

Personal information
- Date of birth: 7 July 1950
- Place of birth: Tehran, Iran
- Date of death: 1 February 2025 (aged 74)
- Position: Forward

Senior career*
Years	Team	Apps	(Gls)
1968–1970	Taj	57	(11)

International career
1970	Iran	2	(3)
- * Club domestic league appearances and goals

Mehdi Haj Mohamad (Persian: مهدی حاج محمد; 7 July 1950 – 1 February 2025) was an Iranian footballer. He played as a forward for the Taj SC. Haj Mohamad died on 1 February 2025, at the age of 74.

== Honours ==
Taj

- Asian Club Championship: 1970
- Iranian Football League: 1970–71
- Tehran Province League: 1971–72
