= Ashiq Ali (footballer) =

Pakistani footballer

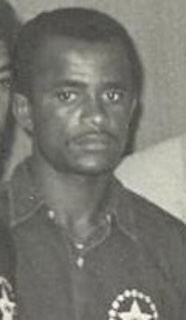
- Ali with Pakistan Airlines in 1971

Personal information
- Place of birth: Karachi, Pakistan
- Position: Defender

Senior career*
Years	Team	Apps	(Gls)
1971–??	Pakistan Airlines		
1977	Dhaka Mohammedan		

International career
1970–1973	Pakistan		
- * Club domestic league appearances and goals

Ashiq Ali (Urdu: عاشق علی), also known as Lala Ashiq, is a Pakistani former footballer who played as a defender, and politician.

== Early life ==
Ashiq hailed from the Lyari locality of Karachi.

== Club career ==
Ashiq represented Karachi Division selection at the National Football Championship. Later on, he joined departmental side Pakistan Airlines in 1971.

In 1977, Ali was among several Pakistani footballers recruited by Bangladeshi club Dhaka Mohammedan, alongside Abdul Ghafoor, Afzal Hussain and Fazlur Rahman. Ghafoor was the only one to remain for the entire season. Fellow Pakistani international Amir Bakhsh subsequently arrived at Mohammedan in 1979, but illness prevented him from making an appearance.

== International career ==
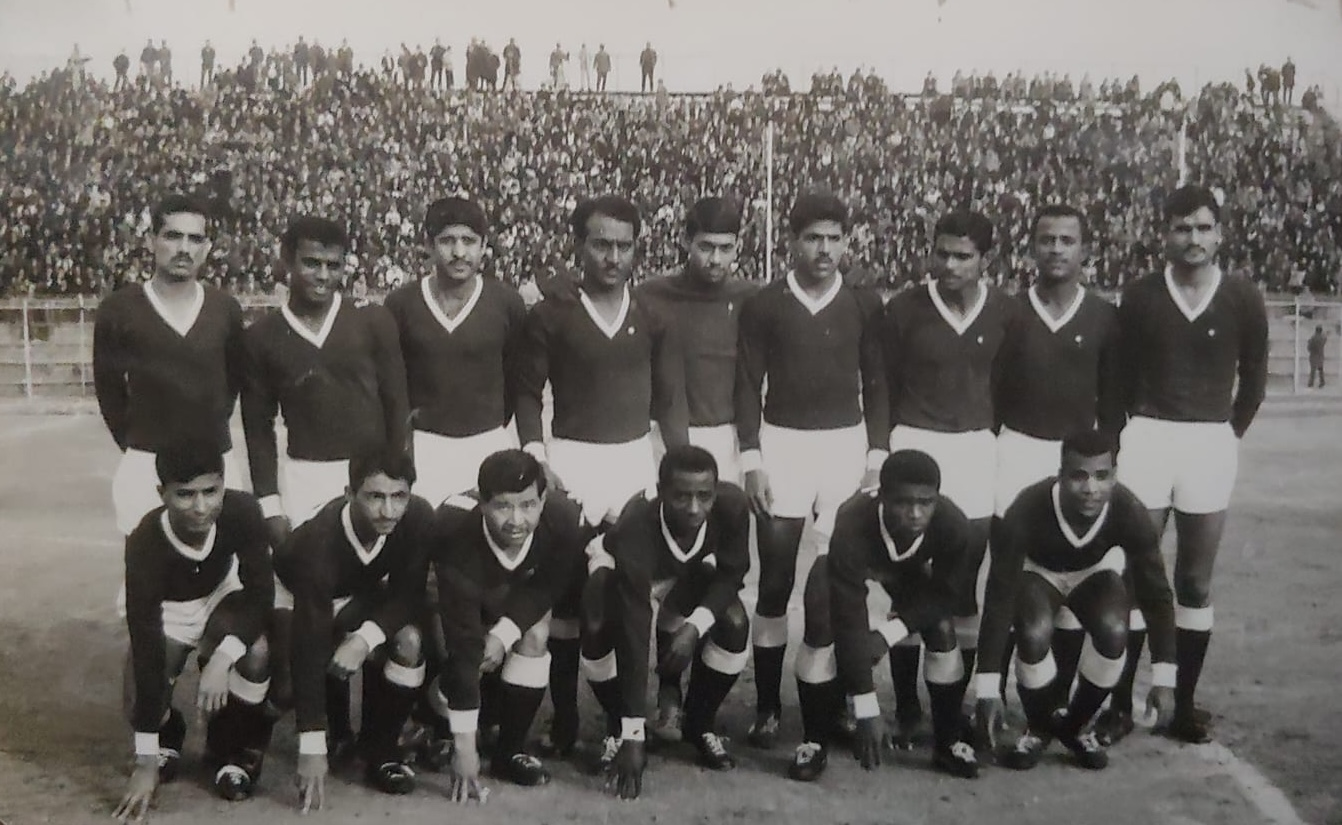
Ashiq standing second from right to left with the PFF XI team at the 1970 Friendship Cup

In 1970, Ashiq was first selected for the Pakistan national team which competed under the name of Pakistan Football Federation XI at the 1970 Jaam-e-Doosti Cup (Friendship Cup) in Iran. The same year, he again toured Iran during the 1970 RCD Cup under the captainship of Qadir Bakhsh. In the latter tournament, he made an official appearance as starter in a 0–7 defeat against Iran. In 1973, Ashiq toured China with the national team for friendly matches.

== Post-retirement ==
After his retirement as player, Ashiq became involved in local politics in Karachi. He was nominated by the Pakistan Peoples Party (PPP) as its candidate for chairperson of Union Committee-7 (UC-7) in Lyari during the 2015 Karachi local government elections. He subsequently served as UC chairman, as reported in 2016.
