= Fereydoun Moeini =

Iranian footballer (born 1946)

Personal information
- Full name: Fereydoun Moeini
- Date of birth: August 23, 1946 (age 80)
- Place of birth: Tehran, Iran
- Position: Midfielder

Youth career
- 1963–1964: Persepolis

Senior career*
Years	Team	Apps	(Gls)
1963–1976	Persepolis	145	(9)

International career
1964–1966	Iran U-23		
1966–1973	Iran		
- * Club domestic league appearances and goals

Fereydoun Moeini (born 23 August 1946) is a retired Iranian football striker who has played all of his careers at Persepolis. He is also a teacher at the universities and was also team manager of Iran national football team. His brother, Masoud is also a former footballer and coach.
