= 1970 Asian Champion Club Tournament =

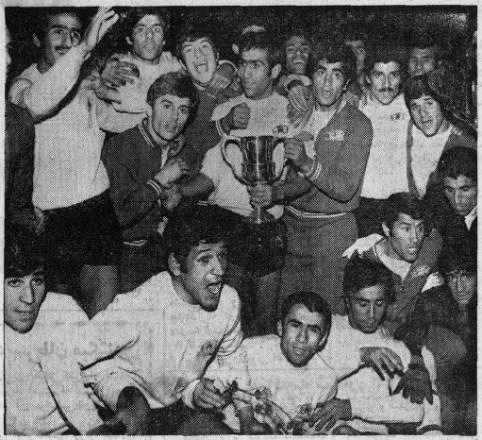
- Taj Tehran lifting the trophy in Amjadieh Stadium, Tehran, Imperial State of Iran

Tournament details
- Host country: Iran
- Dates: 1 – 10 April 1970
- Teams: 8 (7 competed)
- Venue: 1 (in 1 host city)

Final positions
- Champions: (Iran) Taj Tehran (1st title)
- Runners-up: (Israel) Hapoel Tel Aviv
- Third place: (Lebanon) Homenetmen
- Fourth place: (Indonesia) PSMS Medan

Tournament statistics
- Top scorer(s): Gholam Hossein Mazloumi (5 goals)
- Best player: Gholam Hossein Mazloumi

The 1970 Asian Champion Club Tournament was the third edition of the annual Asian club football competition hosted by Asian Football Confederation. Initially, eight clubs from eight countries competed in the tournament, but Sri Lankan club Saunders SC withdrew after the draw. The tournament was held in Tehran, Iran in April. The clubs were split in two groups and the group winners and runners-up advanced to semifinals.

The home club, Taj, became the first Iranian club to win the competition.

== Participants ==
Participants
| Team | Qualifying method |
|---|---|
| (Iran) Taj | 1969 Tehran Local League champions |
| (Israel) Hapoel Tel Aviv | 1968–69 Liga Leumit champions |
| (Lebanon) Homenetmen | 1968–69 Lebanese Premier League champions |
| (Indonesia) PSMS Medan | 1968–69 Perserikatan champions |
| (Malaysia) Selangor | 1969 Malaysia Cup champions |
| (Thailand) Royal Thai Police | Selected by Football Association of Thailand |
| (India) Bengal | 1969–70 Santosh Trophy champions |

=== Withdrawals ===
- Saunders SC - Selected by Football Federation of Sri Lanka

== Teams location ==
Location of the 1970 Asian Champion Club Tournament teams
Red: Group A; Blue: Group B

== Group stage ==
=== Group A ===
| Pos | Team | Pld | W | D | L | GF | GA | GD | Pts | Qualification |
|---|---|---|---|---|---|---|---|---|---|---|
| 1 | (Iran) Taj | 2 | 2 | 0 | 0 | 6 | 0 | +6 | 4 | Advance to knockout stage |
| 2 | (Lebanon) Homenetmen | 2 | 1 | 0 | 1 | 4 | 5 | −1 | 2 | Advance to knockout stage |
| 3 | (Malaysia) Selangor FA | 2 | 0 | 0 | 2 | 2 | 7 | −5 | 0 | |
| 4 | (Sri Lanka) Saunders | 0 | 0 | 0 | 0 | 0 | 0 | 0 | 0 | Withdrew |

1 April 1970

| Taj (Iran) | 3–0 | (Lebanon) Homenetmen |
|---|---|---|
| Mazloumi 55'; Vafakhah 60'; Moeini 69' |

Amjadieh Stadium, Tehran
Attendance: 20,000

3 April 1970

| Homenetmen (Lebanon) | 4–2 | (Malaysia) Selangor FA |

Amjadieh Stadium, Tehran

6 April 1970

| Taj (Iran) | 3–0 | (Malaysia) Selangor FA |
|---|---|---|
| Mazloumi 6', 15', 54' |

Amjadieh Stadium, Tehran
Attendance: 15,000

=== Group B ===
| Pos | Team | Pld | W | D | L | GF | GA | GD | Pts | Qualification |
|---|---|---|---|---|---|---|---|---|---|---|
| 1 | (Israel) Hapoel Tel Aviv | 3 | 3 | 0 | 0 | 11 | 2 | +9 | 6 | Advance to knockout stage |
| 2 | (Indonesia) PSMS Medan | 3 | 2 | 0 | 1 | 6 | 3 | +3 | 4 | Advance to knockout stage |
| 3 | (India) Bengal | 3 | 1 | 0 | 2 | 3 | 5 | −2 | 2 | |
| 4 | (Thailand) Royal Thai Police | 3 | 0 | 0 | 3 | 1 | 11 | −10 | 0 | |

2 April 1970

| Hapoel Tel Aviv (Israel) | 5–0 | (Thailand) Royal Thai Police |
|---|---|---|
| Rahminovich 4'; Feigenbaum 13', 24'; Borba 30'; Hazom 38' |

Amjadieh Stadium, Tehran
2 April 1970

| PSMS Medan (Indonesia) | 1–0 | (India) Bengal |
|---|---|---|
| Kadir 16' (pen.) |

Amjadieh Stadium, Tehran

4 April 1970

| Hapoel Tel Aviv (Israel) | 3–1 | (India) Bengal |
|---|---|---|
| Feigenbaum 40', 55'; Saha 88' (o.g.) | | Bhattacherjee 54' (pen.) |

Amjadieh Stadium, Tehran
Referee: 15,000
4 April 1970

| PSMS Medan (Indonesia) | 4–0 | (Thailand) Royal Thai Police |
|---|---|---|
| Soentoro 6'; Idris 51', 60'; Sihasale 87' |

Amjadieh Stadium, Tehran

6 April 1970

| Hapoel Tel Aviv (Israel) | 3–1 | (Indonesia) PSMS Medan |
|---|---|---|
| Chazom 2'; Cohen 37'; Mordechovich 67' | | Soentoro 4' |

Amjadieh Stadium, Tehran
6 April 1970

| Bengal (India) | 2–1 | (Thailand) Royal Thai Police |

Amjadieh Stadium, Tehran

=== Knockout stage ===
==== Semi-finals ====
8 April 1970
12:00 (UTC+3:30)

| Hapoel Tel Aviv (Israel) | w/o ^{1} | (Lebanon) Homenetmen |

Amjadieh Stadium, Tehran

8 April 1970
15:00 (UTC+3:30)

| Taj (Iran) | 2–0 | (Indonesia) PSMS Medan |
|---|---|---|
| Ghorab 47'; Mazloumi 64' |

Amjadieh Stadium, Tehran
Attendance: 25,000

^{1} The match was scratched and Hapoel advanced to the final after Homenetmen refused to play Hapoel for political reasons.

==== Third-place match ====
10 April 1970
13:00 (UTC+3:30)

| Homenetmen (Lebanon) | 1–0 | (Indonesia) PSMS Medan |

Amjadieh Stadium, Tehran

==== Final ====
10 April 1970
14:30 (UTC+3:30)

| Taj (Iran) | 2–1 (a.e.t.) | (Israel) Hapoel Tel Aviv |
|---|---|---|
| Vafakhah 83'; Moeini 92' | | Chazom 70' |

Amjadieh Stadium, Tehran
Attendance: 35,000
