= 2000–01 Asian Cup Winners' Cup =

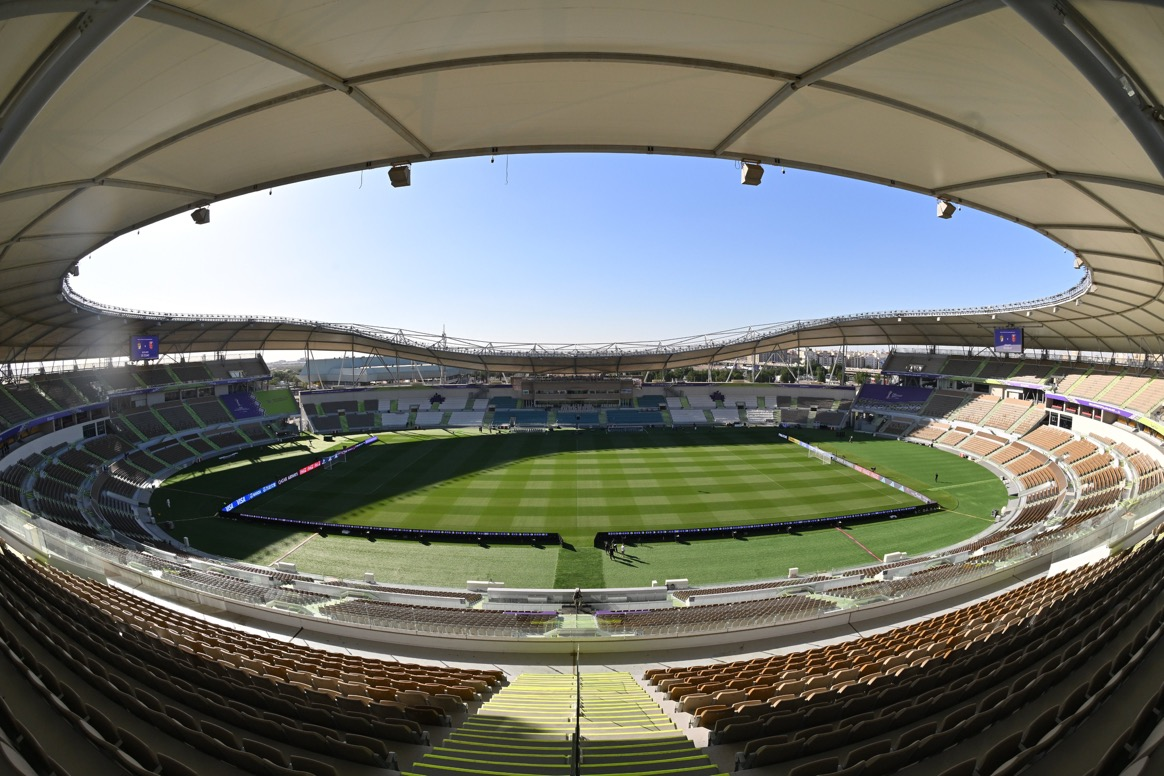
- Prince Abdullah Al Faisal Stadium in Jeddah, Saudi Arabia hosted the final.

Tournament details
- Dates: 25 August 2000 – 19 May 2001
- Teams: 26
- Venue: Jeddah (final rounds)

Final positions
- Champions: (Saudi Arabia) Al-Shabab (1st title)
- Runners-up: (China) Dalian Shide
- Third place: (Japan) Shimizu S-Pulse
- Fourth place: (Iran) Esteghlal

Tournament statistics
- Matches played: 46
- Goals scored: 147 (3.2 per match)

The 2000–01 Asian Cup Winners' Cup was the eleventh edition of association football competition run by the Asian Football Confederation specifically for its members cup holders.

Al Shabab won their first Asian Cup Winners' Cup title, beating Dalian Shide over two legs in the final. As winners, Al Shabab earned the right to play against 2000–01 Asian Club Championship winners Suwon Samsung Bluewings in the 2001 Asian Super Cup.

Shimizu S-Pulse were the defending champions but were defeated by eventual runners-up Dalian Shide in the semi-finals.

== Teams ==
Entry Round	Teams			
Second round	West Asia		East Asia	
Second round	(Saudi Arabia) Al-Shabab		(Japan) Shimizu S-Pulse^{TH}	(Hong Kong) Happy Valley
Second round			(Indonesia) Pupuk Kaltim	(Japan) Nagoya Grampus Eight
Second round			(South Korea) Seongnam Ilhwa Chunma	
First round	(Iran) Esteghlal	(Iraq) Al-Talaba	(China) Dalian Shide	(Maldives) Club Valencia
First round	(Jordan) Al Wahdat	(Kazakhstan) SOPFK Kairat Almaty	(Pakistan) Khan Research Laboratories	Singapore Armed Forces
First round	(Kuwait) Al Arabi	(Lebanon) Al Safa	(Thailand) BEC Tero Sasana	(Vietnam) Cảng Sài Gòn
First round	(Palestine) Shja'eya Union	(Qatar) Al Sadd		
First round	(Syria) Hutteen	(Tajikistan) Regar-TadAZ Tursunzoda		
First round	(Turkmenistan) Nebitçi Balkanabat	(United Arab Emirates) Al Wahda		
First round	(Uzbekistan) Dinamo Samarkand	(Yemen) Al-Wahda (San'a')		

== Bracket ==
First round
(Yemen) Al-Wahda (San'a')	1	0	1
(Syria) Hutteen	5	5	10
(Palestine) Shja'eya Union	2	1	3
(Jordan) Al Wahdat	1	3	4
(Lebanon) Al Safa	–	–
(Kuwait) Al Arabi	–	–	(w/o)
(Turkmenistan) Nebitçi Balkanabat	4	3	7
(Uzbekistan) Dinamo Samarkand	3	2	5
(Kazakhstan) SOPFK Kairat Almaty	2	1	3
(Tajikistan) Regar-TadAZ Tursunzoda	0	1	1
(Qatar) Al Sadd (a)	1	3	4
(Iraq) Al-Talaba	1	3	4
(United Arab Emirates) Al Wahda	3	0	3
(Iran) Esteghlal	2	4	6
(China) Dalian Shide	8	1	9
(Maldives) Club Valencia	0	1	1
(Thailand) BEC Tero Sasana	1	6	7
(Pakistan) Khan Research Laboratories	1	0	1
(Vietnam) Cảng Sài Gòn	0	2	2
Singapore Armed Forces	0	0	0

Second round
(Syria) Hutteen	1	0	1
(Saudi Arabia) Al-Shabab	0	2	2
(Jordan) Al Wahdat	2	0	2
(Kuwait) Al Arabi	1	0	1
(Turkmenistan) Nebitçi Balkanabat	1	1	2
(Kazakhstan) SOPFK Kairat Almaty	0	3	3
(Qatar) Al Sadd	0	1	1
(Iran) Esteghlal	1	2	3
(China) Dalian Shide	2	0	2
(South Korea) Seongnam Ilhwa Chunma	0	1	1
(Japan) Nagoya Grampus Eight	3	3	6
(Hong Kong) Happy Valley	1	0	1
(Indonesia) Pupuk Kaltim	0	1	1
(Thailand) BEC Tero Sasana	1	4	5
(Vietnam) Cảng Sài Gòn	0	0	0
(Japan) Shimizu S-Pulse	2	4	6

Quarter-finals
(Saudi Arabia) Al-Shabab	2	1	3
(Jordan) Al Wahdat	2	0	2
(Kazakhstan) SOPFK Kairat Almaty	0	0	0
(Iran) Esteghlal	0	3	3
(China) Dalian Shide (a)	0	1	1
(Japan) Nagoya Grampus Eight	0	1	1
(Thailand) BEC Tero Sasana	2	2	4
(Japan) Shimizu S-Pulse	2	3	5

Semi-finals
(Saudi Arabia) Al-Shabab	3
(Iran) Esteghlal	2
(China) Dalian Shide (a.e.t.)	3
(Japan) Shimizu S-Pulse	2

Final
(Saudi Arabia) Al-Shabab	4
(China) Dalian Shide	2
Third place match
(Iran) Esteghlal	1
(Japan) Shimizu S-Pulse	3

== First round ==
Team 1	Agg.	Team 2	1st leg	2nd leg
West Asia
Al-Wahda (San'a') (Yemen)	1–10	(Syria) Hutteen	1–5	0–5
Shja'eya Union (Palestine)	3–4	(Jordan) Al Wahdat	2–1	1–3
Al Safa (Lebanon)	(w/o) (Note: Al Safa withdrew.)	(Kuwait) Al Arabi	—	—
Al Sadd (Qatar)	4–4 (a)	(Iraq) Al-Talaba	1–1	3–3
Al Wahda (United Arab Emirates)	3–6	(Iran) Esteghlal	3–2	0–4
SOPFK Kairat Almaty (Kazakhstan)	3–1	(Tajikistan) Regar-TadAZ Tursunzoda	2–0	1–1
Nebitçi Balkanabat (Turkmenistan)	7–5	(Uzbekistan) Dinamo Samarkand	4–3	3–2
East Asia
Cảng Sài Gòn (Vietnam)	2–0	Singapore Armed Forces	0–0	2–0
BEC Tero Sasana (Thailand)	7–1	(Pakistan) Khan Research Laboratories	1–1	6–0
Dalian Shide (China)	9–1	(Maldives) Club Valencia	8–0	1–1

== Second round ==
Team 1	Agg.	Team 2	1st leg	2nd leg
West Asia
Hutteen (Syria)	1–2	(Saudi Arabia) Al-Shabab	1–0	0–2
Al Sadd (Qatar)	1–3	(Iran) Esteghlal	0–1	1–2
Al Wahdat (Jordan)	2–1	(Kuwait) Al Arabi	2–1	0–0
Nebitçi Balkanabat (Turkmenistan)	2–3	(Kazakhstan) SOPFK Kairat Almaty	1–0	1–3
East Asia
Dalian Shide (China)	2–1	(South Korea) Seongnam Ilhwa Chunma	2–0	0–1
Pupuk Kaltim (Indonesia)	1–5	(Thailand) BEC Tero Sasana	0–1	1–4
Cảng Sài Gòn (Vietnam)	0–6	(Japan) Shimizu S-Pulse	0–2	0–4
Nagoya Grampus Eight (Japan)	6–1	(Hong Kong) Happy Valley	3–1	3–0

== Quarterfinals ==
Team 1	Agg.	Team 2	1st leg	2nd leg
West Asia
Al-Shabab (Saudi Arabia)	3–2	(Jordan) Al Wahdat	2–2	1–0
SOPFK Kairat Almaty (Kazakhstan)	0–3	(Iran) Esteghlal	0–0	0–3
East Asia
Dalian Shide (China)	1–1 (a)	(Japan) Nagoya Grampus Eight	0–0	1–1
BEC Tero Sasana (Thailand)	3–5	(Japan) Shimizu S-Pulse	2–2	1–3

== Semifinals ==
17 May 2001

Al-Shabab (Saudi Arabia)	3–2	(Iran) Esteghlal
Al-Owairan 15' (pen.); Al-Shehan 58'; Khalid Al Dossary 87'		Mohammad Navazi 28' (pen.); Ahmad Momenzadeh 60'

Jeddah, Saudi Arabia
17 May 2001

Dalian Shide (China)	3–2 (a.e.t.)	(Japan) Shimizu S-Pulse
Orlando 17', 59'; Hao Haidong 109'		Teruyoshi Ito 18'; Daisuke Ichikawa 56'

Jeddah, Saudi Arabia

== Third place match ==
19 May 2001

Shimizu S-Pulse (Japan)	3–1	(Iran) Esteghlal
Takuma Koga 19'; Takayuki Yokoyama 76', 90'		Alireza Vahedi Nikbakht 34'

Jeddah, Saudi Arabia

== Final ==
19 May 2001

Al-Shabab (Saudi Arabia)	4–2	(China) Dalian Shide
Al-Waked 24' (pen.); Al-Shehan 25', 48', 74'		Yan Song 27'; Hao Haidong 90'

Prince Abdullah Al Faisal Stadium, Jeddah, Saudi Arabia
Referee: Shamsul Maidin (Singapore)

== See also ==
- 2000–01 Asian Club Championship
- 2001 Asian Super Cup
