= Gholam Vafakhah =

Iranian footballer

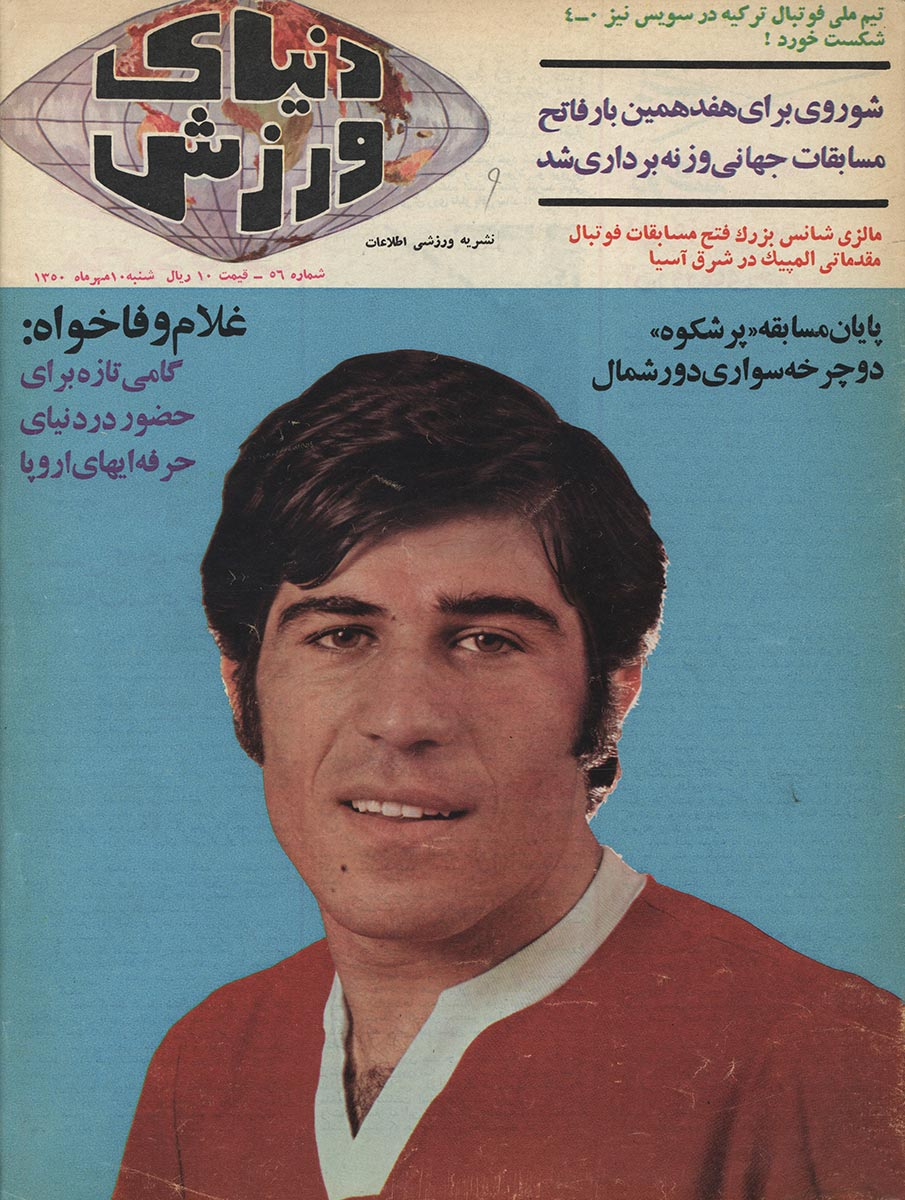
- Gholam Vafakhah on Donyaye Varzesh Magazine cover in 1971

Personal information
- Full name: Gholam Vafakhah
- Date of birth: February 23, 1947 (age 79)
- Place of birth: Tehran, Iran
- Height: 1.75 m (5 ft 9 in)
- Position: Forward

Senior career*
Years	Team	Apps	(Gls)
- Nader
- Daraei
- Oghab
1969	→ Persepolis (help)*		
1970	→ Taj FC (help)*		
- Eghbal

International career
1968–1973	Iran	15	(4)
- * Club domestic league appearances and goals

Gholam Vafakhah (Persian: غلام وفاخواه, born 23 February 1947 in Tehran) is a retired Iranian forward who played for Iran national football team in 1972 Summer Olympics and 1970 RCD Cup. He was formerly playing for Daraei F.C. and Iran national football team.
