= South Korean football clubs in Asian competitions =

This article shows results of South Korean football clubs in Asian competitions. South Korea's K League became the most successful league in the AFC Champions League Elite by winning the most titles with twelve despite absenting itself from the competition for eight years from 1986 to 1993–94 season.

== By competition ==
=== Champions League Elite ===
==== Titles ====
Club	Champions	Runners-up	Seasons won	Seasons runner-up
Pohang Steelers	3	1	1996–97, 1997–98, 2009	2021
Seongnam Ilhwa Chunma	2	2	1995, 2010	1996–97, 2004
Jeonbuk Hyundai Motors	2	1	2006, 2016	2011
Suwon Samsung Bluewings	2	0	2000–01, 2001–02	—
Ulsan Hyundai	2	0	2012, 2020	—
Daewoo Royals	1	0	1985–86	—
FC Seoul	0	2	—	2001–02, 2013
Yangzee	0	1	—	1969

==== All-time table ====
As of 11 March 2026

The following statistics do not include qualifying rounds.

Club	Part	Pld	W	D	L	Win %	Pts	Best result	Matches
Jeonbuk Hyundai Motors	16	142	74	29	39	52.11	251	Champions (2006, 2016)	Matches
Ulsan HD	14	108	59	19	30	54.63	196	Champions (2012, 2020)	Matches
Pohang Steelers	13	105	52	29	24	49.52	185	Champions (1996–97, 1997–98, 2009)	Matches
Suwon Samsung Bluewings	13	100	49	28	23	49.00	175	Champions (2000–01, 2001–02)	Matches
Seongnam FC	9	77	51	12	14	66.23	165	Champions (1995, 2010)	Matches
FC Seoul	10	93	36	30	27	38.71	138	Runners-up (2001–02, 2013)	Matches
Busan IPark	3	21	16	2	3	76.19	50	Champions (1985–86)	Matches
Daegu FC	3	20	11	1	8	55.00	34	Round of 16 (2021, 2022)	Matches
Jeonnam Dragons	3	18	6	6	6	33.33	24	Group stage (2007, 2008, 2022)	Matches
Jeju United	3	20	7	2	11	35.00	23	Round of 16 (2017)	Matches
Gwangju FC	1	10	5	2	3	50.00	17	Quarter-finals (2024–25)	Matches
Yangzee	1	6	5	0	1	83.33	15	Runners-up (1969)	Matches
Incheon United	1	6	4	0	2	66.67	12	Group stage (2023–24)	Matches
Gangwon FC	1	10	2	4	4	20.00	10	Round of 16 (2025–26)	Matches
ROK Army	1	6	3	0	3	50.00	9	Fourth place (1971)	Matches
Gyeongnam FC	1	6	2	2	2	33.33	8	Group stage (2019)	Matches
Daejeon Citizen	1	3	2	0	1	66.67	6	Group stage (2002–03)	Matches
Korea Tungsten	1	2	0	1	1	0.00	1	Third place (1967)	Matches

==== Awards ====
Season	Award	Player	Club	Ref.
1996–97	Most Valuable Player	(South Korea) An Ik-soo	Pohang Steelers	
1996–97	Top goalscorer	(South Korea) Park Tae-ha	Pohang Steelers	
2000–01	Most Valuable Player	(Serbia and Montenegro) Zoltan Sabo	Suwon Samsung Bluewings	
2004	Top goalscorer	(South Korea) Kim Do-hoon	Seongnam Ilhwa Chunma	
2006	Most Valuable Player	(South Korea) Choi Jin-cheul	Jeonbuk Hyundai Motors	
2007	Top goalscorer	(Brazil) Mota	Seongnam Ilhwa Chunma	
2009	Most Valuable Player	(South Korea) No Byung-jun	Pohang Steelers	
2009	Fair Play Award	—	Pohang Steelers	
2010	Most Valuable Player	(Australia) Sasa Ognenovski	Seongnam Ilhwa Chunma	
2010	Top goalscorer	(Brazil) José Mota	Suwon Samsung Bluewings	
2010	Fair Play Award	—	Seongnam Ilhwa Chunma	
2011	Most Valuable Player	(South Korea) Lee Dong-gook	Jeonbuk Hyundai Motors	
2011	Top goalscorer	(South Korea) Lee Dong-gook	Jeonbuk Hyundai Motors	
2011	Fair Play Award	—	Jeonbuk Hyundai Motors	
2012	Most Valuable Player	(South Korea) Lee Keun-ho	Ulsan Hyundai	
2012	Fair Play Award	—	Ulsan Hyundai	
2013	Fair Play Award	—	FC Seoul	
2016	Top goalscorer	(Brazil) Adriano Michael Jackson	FC Seoul	
2020	Most Valuable Player	(South Korea) Yoon Bit-garam	Ulsan Hyundai	
2020	Fair Play Award	—	Ulsan Hyundai	

=== Champions League Two ===
As of 19 February 2026

Club	Part	Pld	W	D	L	Win %	Pts	Best result	Matches
Jeonbuk Hyundai Motors	1	10	6	0	4	60.00	18	Quarter-finals (2024–25)	Matches
Pohang Steelers	1	8	4	2	2	50.00	14	Round of 16 (2025–26)	Matches

=== Cup Winners' Cup ===
Club	Part	Pld	W	D	L	Win %	Pts	Best result	Matches
Suwon Samsung Bluewings	1	8	7	0	1	87.50	21	Runners-up (1997–98)	Matches
Jeonnam Dragons	1	6	5	0	1	83.33	15	Runners-up (1998–99)	Matches
Ulsan Hyundai Horang-i	1	6	4	0	2	66.67	12	Third place (1996–97)	Matches
Jeonbuk Hyundai Motors	1	6	3	2	1	50.00	11	Runners-up (2001–02)	Matches
Seongnam Ilhwa Chunma	1	2	1	0	1	50.00	3	Round of 16 (2000–01)	Matches
Anyang LG Cheetahs	1	2	0	0	2	0.00	0	Quarter-finals (1999–2000)	Matches

=== Women's Champions League ===
As of 20 May 2026

Club	Part	Pld	W	D	L	Win %	Pts	Best result	Matches
Incheon Hyundai Steel Red Angels	1	5	3	1	1	60.00	10	Semi-finals (2024–25)	Matches
Suwon FC Women	1	5	2	1	2	40.00	7	Semi-finals (2025–26)	Matches

== By club ==
=== Busan IPark ===
(Busan) Daewoo Royals and Busan IPark records
Competition	Part	Pld	W	D	L	Win %	Pts	Best result
Champions League Elite	3	21	16	2	3	76.19	50	Champions (1985–86)
Champions League Elite qualification	—	2	2	0	0	100.00	6	—
Total	3	23	18	2	3	78.26	56	1 title

List of matches played by (Busan) Daewoo Royals and Busan IPark
Season	Competition	Result	Round	Aggregate	Score	Venue	Opponent
1985–86	Club Championship	Champions	Qualifying round	14–1	9–0	—	(Macau) Wa Seng
1985–86	Club Championship	Champions	Qualifying round	14–1	5–1	—	(Macau) Wa Seng
1985–86	Club Championship	Champions	Group B	Winners	3–1	—	(Thailand) Bangkok Bank
1985–86	Club Championship	Champions	Group B	Winners	1–0	—	(Syria) Al-Ittihad
1985–86	Club Championship	Champions	Semi-finals	3–0	3–0	—	(Indonesia) Krama Yudha Tiga Berlian
1985–86	Club Championship	Champions	Final	3–1	3–1 (a.e.t.)	—	(Saudi Arabia) Al-Ahli
1998–99	Club Championship	Group stage	First round	6–0	2–0	Away	(Maldives) Club Valencia
1998–99	Club Championship	Group stage	First round	6–0	4–0	Home	(Maldives) Club Valencia
1998–99	Club Championship	Group stage	Second round	9–1	4–1	Away	(Sri Lanka) Saunders SC
1998–99	Club Championship	Group stage	Second round	9–1	5–0	Home	(Sri Lanka) Saunders SC
1998–99	Club Championship	Group stage	Group East	Fourth place	2–2	—	(China) Dalian Wanda
1998–99	Club Championship	Group stage	Group East	Fourth place	1–1	—	(South Korea) Pohang Steelers
1998–99	Club Championship	Group stage	Group East	Fourth place	0–2	—	(Indonesia) Persebaya Surabaya
2005	Champions League	Semi-finals	Group G	Winners	8–0	Home	(Vietnam) Bình Định
2005	Champions League	Semi-finals	Group G	Winners	4–0	Away	(Vietnam) Bình Định
2005	Champions League	Semi-finals	Group G	Winners	2–0	Away	(Thailand) Krung Thai Bank
2005	Champions League	Semi-finals	Group G	Winners	4–0	Home	(Thailand) Krung Thai Bank
2005	Champions League	Semi-finals	Group G	Winners	4–0	Home	(Indonesia) Persebaya Surabaya
2005	Champions League	Semi-finals	Group G	Winners	3–0	Away	(Indonesia) Persebaya Surabaya
2005	Champions League	Semi-finals	Quarter-finals	5–1	3–0	Home	(Qatar) Al-Sadd
2005	Champions League	Semi-finals	Quarter-finals	5–1	2–1	Away	(Qatar) Al-Sadd
2005	Champions League	Semi-finals	Semi-finals	0–7	0–5	Home	(Saudi Arabia) Al-Ittihad
2005	Champions League	Semi-finals	Semi-finals	0–7	0–2	Away	(Saudi Arabia) Al-Ittihad

=== Daegu FC ===
Daegu FC records
Competition	Part	Pld	W	D	L	Win %	Pts	Best result
Champions League Elite	3	20	11	1	8	55.00	34	Round of 16 (2021, 2022)
Champions League Elite qualification	—	1	0	1	0	0.00	1	—
Total	3	21	11	2	8	52.38	35	0 title

List of matches played by Daegu FC
Season	Competition	Result	Round	Aggregate	Score	Venue	Opponent
2019	Champions League	Group stage	Group F	Third place	3–1	Away	(Australia) Melbourne Victory
2019	Champions League	Group stage	Group F	Third place	4–0	Home	(Australia) Melbourne Victory
2019	Champions League	Group stage	Group F	Third place	3–1	Home	(China) Guangzhou Evergrande
2019	Champions League	Group stage	Group F	Third place	0–1	Away	(China) Guangzhou Evergrande
2019	Champions League	Group stage	Group F	Third place	0–2	Away	(Japan) Sanfrecce Hiroshima
2019	Champions League	Group stage	Group F	Third place	0–1	Home	(Japan) Sanfrecce Hiroshima
2021	Champions League	Round of 16	Group I	Runners-up	1–3	—	(Japan) Kawasaki Frontale
2021	Champions League	Round of 16	Group I	Runners-up	2–3	—	(Japan) Kawasaki Frontale
2021	Champions League	Round of 16	Group I	Runners-up	7–0	—	(Philippines) United City
2021	Champions League	Round of 16	Group I	Runners-up	4–0	—	(Philippines) United City
2021	Champions League	Round of 16	Group I	Runners-up	5–0	—	(China) Beijing Guoan
2021	Champions League	Round of 16	Group I	Runners-up	3–0	—	(China) Beijing Guoan
2021	Champions League	Round of 16	Round of 16	2–4	2–4	—	(Japan) Nagoya Grampus
2022	Champions League	Round of 16	Qualifying play-offs	1–1 (3–2 p)	1–1 (a.e.t.)	—	(Thailand) Buriram United
2022	Champions League	Round of 16	Group F	Winners	7–0	—	(China) Shandong Taishan
2022	Champions League	Round of 16	Group F	Winners	4–0	—	(China) Shandong Taishan
2022	Champions League	Round of 16	Group F	Winners	0–3	—	(Singapore) Lion City Sailors
2022	Champions League	Round of 16	Group F	Winners	2–1	—	(Singapore) Lion City Sailors
2022	Champions League	Round of 16	Group F	Winners	1–0	—	(Japan) Urawa Red Diamonds
2022	Champions League	Round of 16	Group F	Winners	0–0	—	(Japan) Urawa Red Diamonds
2022	Champions League	Round of 16	Round of 16	1–2	1–2 (a.e.t.)	—	(South Korea) Jeonbuk Hyundai Motors

=== Daejeon Citizen ===
Daejeon Citizen records
Competition	Part	Pld	W	D	L	Win %	Pts	Best result
Champions League Elite	1	3	2	0	1	66.67	6	Group stage (2002–03)
Champions League Elite qualification	—	4	4	0	0	100.00	12	—
Total	1	7	6	0	1	85.71	18	0 title

List of matches played by Daejeon Citizen
Season	Competition	Result	Round	Aggregate	Score	Venue	Opponent
2002–03	Champions League	Group stage	Third qualifying round	8–1	5–1	Away	(Macau) Monte Carlo
2002–03	Champions League	Group stage	Third qualifying round	8–1	3–0	Home	(Macau) Monte Carlo
2002–03	Champions League	Group stage	Fourth qualifying round	8–1	6–0	Home	(India) Mohun Bagan
2002–03	Champions League	Group stage	Fourth qualifying round	8–1	2–1	Away	(India) Mohun Bagan
2002–03	Champions League	Group stage	Group A	Runners-up	2–1	—	(China) Shanghai Shenhua
2002–03	Champions League	Group stage	Group A	Runners-up	0–2	—	(Thailand) BEC Tero Sasana
2002–03	Champions League	Group stage	Group A	Runners-up	1–0	—	(Japan) Kashima Antlers

=== FC Seoul ===
Anyang LG Cheetahs and FC Seoul records
Competition	Part	Pld	W	D	L	Win %	Pts	Best result
Champions League Elite	10	93	36	30	27	38.71	138	Runners-up (2001–02, 2013)
Champions League Elite qualification	—	2	2	0	0	100.00	6	—
Cup Winners' Cup	1	2	0	0	2	0.00	0	Quarter-finals (1999–2000)
Total	11	97	38	30	29	39.18	144	0 title

List of matches played by Anyang LG Cheetahs and FC Seoul
Season	Competition	Result	Round	Aggregate	Score	Venue	Opponent
1999–2000	Cup Winners' Cup	Quarter-finals	Quarter-finals	2–5	1–3	Away	(Japan) Shimizu S-Pulse
1999–2000	Cup Winners' Cup	Quarter-finals	Quarter-finals	2–5	1–2	Home	(Japan) Shimizu S-Pulse
2001–02	Club Championship	Runners-up	Second round	11–0	8–0	Home	(Bangladesh) Muktijoddha Sangsad
2001–02	Club Championship	Runners-up	Second round	11–0	3–0	Away	(Bangladesh) Muktijoddha Sangsad
2001–02	Club Championship	Runners-up	Group East	Runners-up	0–0	—	(South Korea) Suwon Samsung Bluewings
2001–02	Club Championship	Runners-up	Group East	Runners-up	1–1	—	(China) Dalian Shide
2001–02	Club Championship	Runners-up	Group East	Runners-up	1–1	—	(Japan) Kashima Antlers
2001–02	Club Championship	Runners-up	Semi-finals	2–1	2–1	—	(Iran) Esteghlal
2001–02	Club Championship	Runners-up	Final	0–0 (2–4 p)	0–0 (a.e.t.)	—	(South Korea) Suwon Samsung Bluewings
2009	Champions League	Quarter-finals	Group F	Runners-up	4–2	Away	(Indonesia) Sriwijaya
2009	Champions League	Quarter-finals	Group F	Runners-up	5–1	Home	(Indonesia) Sriwijaya
2009	Champions League	Quarter-finals	Group F	Runners-up	2–4	Home	(Japan) Gamba Osaka
2009	Champions League	Quarter-finals	Group F	Runners-up	2–1	Away	(Japan) Gamba Osaka
2009	Champions League	Quarter-finals	Group F	Runners-up	0–2	Away	(China) Shandong Luneng
2009	Champions League	Quarter-finals	Group F	Runners-up	1–1	Home	(China) Shandong Luneng
2009	Champions League	Quarter-finals	Round of 16	2–2 (5–4 p)	2–2 (a.e.t.)	—	(Japan) Kashima Antlers
2009	Champions League	Quarter-finals	Quarter-finals	3–4	2–3	Away	(Qatar) Umm-Salal
2009	Champions League	Quarter-finals	Quarter-finals	3–4	1–1	Home	(Qatar) Umm-Salal
2011	Champions League	Quarter-finals	Group F	Winners	1–0	Away	(United Arab Emirates) Al-Ain
2011	Champions League	Quarter-finals	Group F	Winners	3–0	Home	(United Arab Emirates) Al-Ain
2011	Champions League	Quarter-finals	Group F	Winners	3–0	Home	(China) Hangzhou Greentown
2011	Champions League	Quarter-finals	Group F	Winners	1–1	Away	(China) Hangzhou Greentown
2011	Champions League	Quarter-finals	Group F	Winners	1–1	Away	(Japan) Nagoya Grampus
2011	Champions League	Quarter-finals	Group F	Winners	0–2	Home	(Japan) Nagoya Grampus
2011	Champions League	Quarter-finals	Round of 16	3–0	3–0	—	(Japan) Kashima Antlers
2011	Champions League	Quarter-finals	Quarter-finals	2–3	1–3	Away	(Saudi Arabia) Al-Ittihad
2011	Champions League	Quarter-finals	Quarter-finals	2–3	1–0	Home	(Saudi Arabia) Al-Ittihad
2013	Champions League	Runners-up	Group E	Winners	5–1	Home	(China) Jiangsu Sainty
2013	Champions League	Runners-up	Group E	Winners	2–0	Away	(China) Jiangsu Sainty
2013	Champions League	Runners-up	Group E	Winners	0–0	Away	(Thailand) Buriram United
2013	Champions League	Runners-up	Group E	Winners	2–2	Home	(Thailand) Buriram United
2013	Champions League	Runners-up	Group E	Winners	2–1	Home	(Japan) Vegalta Sendai
2013	Champions League	Runners-up	Group E	Winners	0–1	Away	(Japan) Vegalta Sendai
2013	Champions League	Runners-up	Round of 16	3–1	0–0	Away	(China) Beijing Guoan
2013	Champions League	Runners-up	Round of 16	3–1	3–1	Home	(China) Beijing Guoan
2013	Champions League	Runners-up	Quarter-finals	2–1	1–1	Away	(Saudi Arabia) Al-Ahli
2013	Champions League	Runners-up	Quarter-finals	2–1	1–0	Home	(Saudi Arabia) Al-Ahli
2013	Champions League	Runners-up	Semi-finals	4–2	2–0	Home	(Iran) Esteghlal
2013	Champions League	Runners-up	Semi-finals	4–2	2–2	Away	(Iran) Esteghlal
2013	Champions League	Runners-up	Final	3–3 (a)	2–2	Home	(China) Guangzhou Evergrande
2013	Champions League	Runners-up	Final	3–3 (a)	1–1	Away	(China) Guangzhou Evergrande
2014	Champions League	Semi-finals	Group F	Winners	2–0	Home	(Australia) Central Coast Mariners
2014	Champions League	Semi-finals	Group F	Winners	1–0	Away	(Australia) Central Coast Mariners
2014	Champions League	Semi-finals	Group F	Winners	1–1	Away	(China) Beijing Guoan
2014	Champions League	Semi-finals	Group F	Winners	2–1	Home	(China) Beijing Guoan
2014	Champions League	Semi-finals	Group F	Winners	1–2	Away	(Japan) Sanfrecce Hiroshima
2014	Champions League	Semi-finals	Group F	Winners	2–2	Home	(Japan) Sanfrecce Hiroshima
2014	Champions League	Semi-finals	Round of 16	4–4 (a)	3–2	Away	(Japan) Kawasaki Frontale
2014	Champions League	Semi-finals	Round of 16	4–4 (a)	1–2	Home	(Japan) Kawasaki Frontale
2014	Champions League	Semi-finals	Quarter-finals	0–0 (3–0 p)	0–0	Away	(South Korea) Pohang Steelers
2014	Champions League	Semi-finals	Quarter-finals	0–0 (3–0 p)	0–0 (a.e.t.)	Home	(South Korea) Pohang Steelers
2014	Champions League	Semi-finals	Semi-finals	0–2	0–0	Home	(Australia) Western Sydney Wanderers
2014	Champions League	Semi-finals	Semi-finals	0–2	0–2	Away	(Australia) Western Sydney Wanderers
2015	Champions League	Round of 16	Qualifying play-offs	7–0	7–0	—	(Vietnam) Hanoi FC
2015	Champions League	Round of 16	Group H	Runners-up	0–1	Away	(China) Guangzhou Evergrande
2015	Champions League	Round of 16	Group H	Runners-up	0–0	Home	(China) Guangzhou Evergrande
2015	Champions League	Round of 16	Group H	Runners-up	1–0	Home	(Japan) Kashima Antlers
2015	Champions League	Round of 16	Group H	Runners-up	3–2	Away	(Japan) Kashima Antlers
2015	Champions League	Round of 16	Group H	Runners-up	0–0	Home	(Australia) Western Sydney Wanderers
2015	Champions League	Round of 16	Group H	Runners-up	1–1	Away	(Australia) Western Sydney Wanderers
2015	Champions League	Round of 16	Round of 16	3–6	1–3	Home	(Japan) Gamba Osaka
2015	Champions League	Round of 16	Round of 16	3–6	2–3	Away	(Japan) Gamba Osaka
2016	Champions League	Semi-finals	Group F	Winners	6–0	Away	(Thailand) Buriram United
2016	Champions League	Semi-finals	Group F	Winners	2–1	Home	(Thailand) Buriram United
2016	Champions League	Semi-finals	Group F	Winners	4–1	Home	(Japan) Sanfrecce Hiroshima
2016	Champions League	Semi-finals	Group F	Winners	1–2	Away	(Japan) Sanfrecce Hiroshima
2016	Champions League	Semi-finals	Group F	Winners	4–1	Away	(China) Shandong Luneng
2016	Champions League	Semi-finals	Group F	Winners	0–0	Home	(China) Shandong Luneng
2016	Champions League	Semi-finals	Round of 16	3–3 (7–6 p)	0–1	Away	(Japan) Urawa Red Diamonds
2016	Champions League	Semi-finals	Round of 16	3–3 (7–6 p)	3–2 (a.e.t.)	Home	(Japan) Urawa Red Diamonds
2016	Champions League	Semi-finals	Quarter-finals	4–2	3–1	Home	(China) Shandong Luneng
2016	Champions League	Semi-finals	Quarter-finals	4–2	1–1	Away	(China) Shandong Luneng
2016	Champions League	Semi-finals	Semi-finals	3–5	1–4	Away	(South Korea) Jeonbuk Hyundai Motors
2016	Champions League	Semi-finals	Semi-finals	3–5	2–1	Home	(South Korea) Jeonbuk Hyundai Motors
2017	Champions League	Group stage	Group F	Third place	0–1	Home	(China) Shanghai SIPG
2017	Champions League	Group stage	Group F	Third place	2–4	Away	(China) Shanghai SIPG
2017	Champions League	Group stage	Group F	Third place	2–5	Away	(Japan) Urawa Red Diamonds
2017	Champions League	Group stage	Group F	Third place	1–0	Home	(Japan) Urawa Red Diamonds
2017	Champions League	Group stage	Group F	Third place	2–3	Home	(Australia) Western Sydney Wanderers
2017	Champions League	Group stage	Group F	Third place	3–2	Away	(Australia) Western Sydney Wanderers
2020	Champions League	Group stage	Qualifying play-offs	4–1	4–1	—	(Malaysia) Kedah
2020	Champions League	Group stage	Group E	Third place	1–0	—	(Australia) Melbourne Victory
2020	Champions League	Group stage	Group E	Third place	1–2	—	(Australia) Melbourne Victory
2020	Champions League	Group stage	Group E	Third place	1–2	—	(China) Beijing Guoan
2020	Champions League	Group stage	Group E	Third place	1–3	—	(China) Beijing Guoan
2020	Champions League	Group stage	Group E	Third place	5–0	—	(Thailand) Chiangrai United
2020	Champions League	Group stage	Group E	Third place	1–2	—	(Thailand) Chiangrai United
2025–26	Champions League Elite	Round of 16	League East	Seventh place	1–1	Away	(Japan) Machida Zelvia
2025–26	Champions League Elite	Round of 16	League East	Seventh place	3–0	Home	(Thailand) Buriram United
2025–26	Champions League Elite	Round of 16	League East	Seventh place	0–2	Away	(China) Shanghai Shenhua
2025–26	Champions League Elite	Round of 16	League East	Seventh place	0–0	Home	(China) Chengdu Rongcheng
2025–26	Champions League Elite	Round of 16	League East	Seventh place	3–1	Away	(China) Shanghai Port
2025–26	Champions League Elite	Round of 16	League East	Seventh place	1–1	Home	(Australia) Melbourne City
2025–26	Champions League Elite	Round of 16	League East	Seventh place	0–2	Away	(Japan) Vissel Kobe
2025–26	Champions League Elite	Round of 16	League East	Seventh place	2–2	Home	(Japan) Sanfrecce Hiroshima
2025–26	Champions League Elite	Round of 16	Round of 16	1–3	0–1	Home	(Japan) Vissel Kobe
2025–26	Champions League Elite	Round of 16	Round of 16	1–3	1–2	Away	(Japan) Vissel Kobe

=== Gangwon FC ===
Gangwon FC records
Competition	Part	Pld	W	D	L	Win %	Pts	Best result
Champions League Elite	1	10	2	4	4	20.00	10	Round of 16 (2025–26)

List of matches played by Gangwon FC
Season	Competition	Result	Round	Aggregate	Score	Venue	Opponent
2025–26	Champions League Elite	Round of 16	League East	Eighth place	2–1	Home	(China) Shanghai Shenhua
2025–26	Champions League Elite	Round of 16	League East	Eighth place	0–1	Away	(China) Chengdu Rongcheng
2025–26	Champions League Elite	Round of 16	League East	Eighth place	4–3	Home	(Japan) Vissel Kobe
2025–26	Champions League Elite	Round of 16	League East	Eighth place	0–1	Away	(Japan) Sanfrecce Hiroshima
2025–26	Champions League Elite	Round of 16	League East	Eighth place	1–3	Home	(Japan) Machida Zelvia
2025–26	Champions League Elite	Round of 16	League East	Eighth place	2–2	Away	(Thailand) Buriram United
2025–26	Champions League Elite	Round of 16	League East	Eighth place	0–0	Home	(China) Shanghai Port
2025–26	Champions League Elite	Round of 16	League East	Eighth place	0–0	Away	(Australia) Melbourne City
2025–26	Champions League Elite	Round of 16	Round of 16	0–1	0–0	Home	(Japan) Machida Zelvia
2025–26	Champions League Elite	Round of 16	Round of 16	0–1	0–1	Away	(Japan) Machida Zelvia

=== Gwangju FC ===
Gwangju FC records
Competition	Part	Pld	W	D	L	Win %	Pts	Best result
Champions League Elite	1	10	5	2	3	50.00	17	Quarter-finals (2024–25)

List of matches played by Gwangju FC
Season	Competition	Result	Round	Aggregate	Score	Venue	Opponent
2024–25	Champions League Elite	Quarter-finals	League East	Fourth place	7–3	Home	(Japan) Yokohama F. Marinos
2024–25	Champions League Elite	Quarter-finals	League East	Fourth place	1–0	Away	(Japan) Kawasaki Frontale
2024–25	Champions League Elite	Quarter-finals	League East	Fourth place	3–1	Home	(Malaysia) Johor Darul Ta'zim
2024–25	Champions League Elite	Quarter-finals	League East	Fourth place	0–2	Away	(Japan) Vissel Kobe
2024–25	Champions League Elite	Quarter-finals	League East	Fourth place	1–0	Home	(China) Shanghai Shenhua
2024–25	Champions League Elite	Quarter-finals	League East	Fourth place	1–1	Away	(China) Shanghai Port
2024–25	Champions League Elite	Quarter-finals	League East	Fourth place	~~1–3~~ Cancelled	Away	(China) Shandong Taishan
2024–25	Champions League Elite	Quarter-finals	League East	Fourth place	2–2	Home	(Thailand) Buriram United
2024–25	Champions League Elite	Quarter-finals	Round of 16	3–2	0–2	Away	(Japan) Vissel Kobe
2024–25	Champions League Elite	Quarter-finals	Round of 16	3–2	3–0 (a.e.t.)	Home	(Japan) Vissel Kobe
2024–25	Champions League Elite	Quarter-finals	Quarter-finals	0–7	0–7	—	(Saudi Arabia) Al-Hilal

=== Gyeongnam FC ===
Gyeongnam FC records
Competition	Part	Pld	W	D	L	Win %	Pts	Best result
Champions League Elite	1	6	2	2	2	33.33	8	Group stage (2019)

List of matches played by Gyeongnam FC
Season	Competition	Result	Round	Aggregate	Score	Venue	Opponent
2019	Champions League	Group stage	Group E	Third place	2–2	Home	(China) Shandong Luneng
2019	Champions League	Group stage	Group E	Third place	1–2	Away	(China) Shandong Luneng
2019	Champions League	Group stage	Group E	Third place	1–1	Away	(Malaysia) Johor Darul Ta'zim
2019	Champions League	Group stage	Group E	Third place	2–0	Home	(Malaysia) Johor Darul Ta'zim
2019	Champions League	Group stage	Group E	Third place	2–3	Home	(Japan) Kashima Antlers
2019	Champions League	Group stage	Group E	Third place	1–0	Away	(Japan) Kashima Antlers

=== Incheon Hyundai Steel Red Angels ===
Incheon Hyundai Steel Red Angels records
Competition	Part	Pld	W	D	L	Win %	Pts	Best result
Women's Club Championship	2	7	4	0	3	57.14	12	Runners-up (2023)
Women's Champions League	1	5	3	1	1	60.00	10	Semi-finals (2024–25)
Total	3	12	7	1	4	58.33	22	0 title

List of matches played by Incheon Hyundai Steel Red Angels
Season	Competition	Result	Round	Aggregate	Score	Venue	Opponent
2019	Women's Club Championship	Third place	—	Third place	4–0	—	(Australia) Melbourne Victory
2019	Women's Club Championship	Third place	—	Third place	0–2	—	(Japan) Tokyo Verdy Beleza
2019	Women's Club Championship	Third place	—	Third place	0–2	—	(China) Jiangsu Suning
2023	Women's Club Championship	Runners-up	Group B	Winners	2–0	—	(Uzbekistan) Sevinch
2023	Women's Club Championship	Runners-up	Group B	Winners	2–1	—	(Iran) Bam Khatoon
2023	Women's Club Championship	Runners-up	Group B	Winners	3–0	—	(Australia) Sydney FC
2023	Women's Club Championship	Runners-up	Final	1–2	1–2	—	(Japan) Urawa Red Diamonds Ladies
2024–25	Women's Champions League	Semi-finals	Group A	Winners	3–0	—	(Malaysia) Sabah Women
2024–25	Women's Champions League	Semi-finals	Group A	Winners	2–2	—	(United Arab Emirates) Abu Dhabi Country Club
2024–25	Women's Champions League	Semi-finals	Group A	Winners	2–0	—	(China) Wuhan Jianghan University
2024–25	Women's Champions League	Semi-finals	Quarter-finals	1–0	1–0	—	(Iran) Bam Khatoon
2024–25	Women's Champions League	Semi-finals	Semi-finals	0–1	0–1	—	(Australia) Melbourne City

=== Incheon United ===
Incheon United records
Competition	Part	Pld	W	D	L	Win %	Pts	Best result
Champions League Elite	1	6	4	0	2	66.67	12	Group stage (2023–24)
Champions League Elite qualification	—	1	1	0	0	100.00	3	—
Total	1	7	5	0	2	71.43	15	0 title

List of matches played by Incheon United
Season	Competition	Result	Round	Aggregate	Score	Venue	Opponent
2023–24	Champions League	Group stage	Qualifying play-offs	3–1	3–1 (a.e.t.)	—	(Vietnam) Haiphong
2023–24	Champions League	Group stage	Group G	Third place	4–2	Away	(Japan) Yokohama F. Marinos
2023–24	Champions League	Group stage	Group G	Third place	2–1	Home	(Japan) Yokohama F. Marinos
2023–24	Champions League	Group stage	Group G	Third place	4–0	Home	(Philippines) Kaya–Iloilo
2023–24	Champions League	Group stage	Group G	Third place	3–1	Away	(Philippines) Kaya–Iloilo
2023–24	Champions League	Group stage	Group G	Third place	0–2	Home	(China) Shandong Taishan
2023–24	Champions League	Group stage	Group G	Third place	1–3	Away	(China) Shandong Taishan

=== Jeju United ===
Jeju United records
Competition	Part	Pld	W	D	L	Win %	Pts	Best result
Champions League Elite	3	20	7	2	11	35.00	23	Round of 16 (2017)

List of matches played by Jeju United
Season	Competition	Result	Round	Aggregate	Score	Venue	Opponent
2011	Champions League	Group stage	Group E	Third place	0–1	Home	(China) Tianjin TEDA
2011	Champions League	Group stage	Group E	Third place	0–3	Away	(China) Tianjin TEDA
2011	Champions League	Group stage	Group E	Third place	2–1	Away	(Australia) Melbourne Victory
2011	Champions League	Group stage	Group E	Third place	1–1	Home	(Australia) Melbourne Victory
2011	Champions League	Group stage	Group E	Third place	2–1	Home	(Japan) Gamba Osaka
2011	Champions League	Group stage	Group E	Third place	1–3	Away	(Japan) Gamba Osaka
2017	Champions League	Round of 16	Group H	Runners-up	0–1	Home	(China) Jiangsu Suning
2017	Champions League	Round of 16	Group H	Runners-up	2–1	Away	(China) Jiangsu Suning
2017	Champions League	Round of 16	Group H	Runners-up	4–1	Away	(Japan) Gamba Osaka
2017	Champions League	Round of 16	Group H	Runners-up	2–0	Home	(Japan) Gamba Osaka
2017	Champions League	Round of 16	Group H	Runners-up	3–3	Away	(Australia) Adelaide United
2017	Champions League	Round of 16	Group H	Runners-up	1–3	Home	(Australia) Adelaide United
2017	Champions League	Round of 16	Round of 16	2–3	2–0	Home	(Japan) Urawa Red Diamonds
2017	Champions League	Round of 16	Round of 16	2–3	0–3 (a.e.t.)	Away	(Japan) Urawa Red Diamonds
2018	Champions League	Group stage	Group G	Fourth place	0–1	Home	(Japan) Cerezo Osaka
2018	Champions League	Group stage	Group G	Fourth place	1–2	Away	(Japan) Cerezo Osaka
2018	Champions League	Group stage	Group G	Fourth place	2–0	Away	(Thailand) Buriram United
2018	Champions League	Group stage	Group G	Fourth place	0–1	Home	(Thailand) Buriram United
2018	Champions League	Group stage	Group G	Fourth place	3–5	Away	(China) Guangzhou Evergrande
2018	Champions League	Group stage	Group G	Fourth place	0–2	Home	(China) Guangzhou Evergrande

=== Jeonbuk Hyundai Motors ===
Jeonbuk Hyundai Motors records
Competition	Part	Pld	W	D	L	Win %	Pts	Best result
Champions League Elite	16	142	74	29	39	52.11	251	Champions (2006, 2016)
Champions League Two	1	10	6	0	4	60.00	18	Quarter-finals (2024–25)
Cup Winners' Cup	1	6	3	2	1	50.00	11	Runners-up (2001–02)
Total	18	158	83	31	44	52.53	280	2 titles

List of matches played by Jeonbuk Hyundai Motors
Season	Competition	Result	Round	Aggregate	Score	Venue	Opponent
2001–02	Cup Winners' Cup	Runners-up	Round of 16	12–0	8–0	Home	(Maldives) Victory
2001–02	Cup Winners' Cup	Runners-up	Round of 16	12–0	4–0	Away	(Maldives) Victory
2001–02	Cup Winners' Cup	Runners-up	Quarter-finals	3–3 (a)	1–1	Home	(Japan) Shimizu S-Pulse
2001–02	Cup Winners' Cup	Runners-up	Quarter-finals	3–3 (a)	2–2	Away	(Japan) Shimizu S-Pulse
2001–02	Cup Winners' Cup	Runners-up	Semi-finals	2–0	2–0	—	(China) Chongqing Lifan
2001–02	Cup Winners' Cup	Runners-up	Final	1–2	1–2 (a.e.t.)	—	(Saudi Arabia) Al-Hilal
2004	Champions League	Semi-finals	Group E	Winners	1–2	Home	(Japan) Júbilo Iwata
2004	Champions League	Semi-finals	Group E	Winners	4–2	Away	(Japan) Júbilo Iwata
2004	Champions League	Semi-finals	Group E	Winners	1–0	Away	(China) Shanghai Shenhua
2004	Champions League	Semi-finals	Group E	Winners	0–1	Home	(China) Shanghai Shenhua
2004	Champions League	Semi-finals	Group E	Winners	4–0	Home	(Thailand) BEC Tero Sasana
2004	Champions League	Semi-finals	Group E	Winners	4–0	Away	(Thailand) BEC Tero Sasana
2004	Champions League	Semi-finals	Quarter-finals	5–1	1–0	Away	(United Arab Emirates) Al-Ain
2004	Champions League	Semi-finals	Quarter-finals	5–1	4–1	Home	(United Arab Emirates) Al-Ain
2004	Champions League	Semi-finals	Semi-finals	3–4	1–2	Away	(Saudi Arabia) Al-Ittihad
2004	Champions League	Semi-finals	Semi-finals	3–4	2–2	Home	(Saudi Arabia) Al-Ittihad
2006	Champions League	Champions	Group E	Winners	3–2	Home	(Japan) Gamba Osaka
2006	Champions League	Champions	Group E	Winners	1–1	Away	(Japan) Gamba Osaka
2006	Champions League	Champions	Group E	Winners	0–1	Away	(China) Dalian Shide
2006	Champions League	Champions	Group E	Winners	3–1	Home	(China) Dalian Shide
2006	Champions League	Champions	Group E	Winners	3–0	Home	(Vietnam) Da Nang
2006	Champions League	Champions	Group E	Winners	1–0	Away	(Vietnam) Da Nang
2006	Champions League	Champions	Quarter-finals	4–3	0–1	Away	(China) Shanghai Shenhua
2006	Champions League	Champions	Quarter-finals	4–3	4–2	Home	(China) Shanghai Shenhua
2006	Champions League	Champions	Semi-finals	6–5	2–3	Home	(South Korea) Ulsan Hyundai Horang-i
2006	Champions League	Champions	Semi-finals	6–5	4–1	Away	(South Korea) Ulsan Hyundai Horang-i
2006	Champions League	Champions	Final	3–2	2–0	Home	(Syria) Al-Karamah
2006	Champions League	Champions	Final	3–2	1–2	Away	(Syria) Al-Karamah
2007	Champions League	Quarter-finals	Quarter-finals	1–4	1–2	Away	(Japan) Urawa Red Diamonds
2007	Champions League	Quarter-finals	Quarter-finals	1–4	0–2	Home	(Japan) Urawa Red Diamonds
2010	Champions League	Quarter-finals	Group F	Runners-up	4–1	Away	(Indonesia) Persipura Jayapura
2010	Champions League	Quarter-finals	Group F	Runners-up	8–0	Home	(Indonesia) Persipura Jayapura
2010	Champions League	Quarter-finals	Group F	Runners-up	1–2	Home	(Japan) Kashima Antlers
2010	Champions League	Quarter-finals	Group F	Runners-up	1–2	Away	(Japan) Kashima Antlers
2010	Champions League	Quarter-finals	Group F	Runners-up	2–1	Away	(China) Changchun Yatai
2010	Champions League	Quarter-finals	Group F	Runners-up	1–0	Home	(China) Changchun Yatai
2010	Champions League	Quarter-finals	Round of 16	3–2	3–2 (a.e.t.)	—	(Australia) Adelaide United
2010	Champions League	Quarter-finals	Quarter-finals	1–2	0–2	Home	(Saudi Arabia) Al-Shabab
2010	Champions League	Quarter-finals	Quarter-finals	1–2	1–0	Away	(Saudi Arabia) Al-Shabab
2011	Champions League	Runners-up	Group G	Winners	1–0	Home	(China) Shandong Luneng
2011	Champions League	Runners-up	Group G	Winners	2–1	Away	(China) Shandong Luneng
2011	Champions League	Runners-up	Group G	Winners	4–0	Away	(Indonesia) Arema
2011	Champions League	Runners-up	Group G	Winners	6–0	Home	(Indonesia) Arema
2011	Champions League	Runners-up	Group G	Winners	0–1	Away	(Japan) Cerezo Osaka
2011	Champions League	Runners-up	Group G	Winners	1–0	Home	(Japan) Cerezo Osaka
2011	Champions League	Runners-up	Round of 16	3–0	3–0	—	(China) Tianjin TEDA
2011	Champions League	Runners-up	Quarter-finals	9–5	3–4	Away	(Japan) Cerezo Osaka
2011	Champions League	Runners-up	Quarter-finals	9–5	6–1	Home	(Japan) Cerezo Osaka
2011	Champions League	Runners-up	Semi-finals	5–3	3–2	Away	(Saudi Arabia) Al-Ittihad
2011	Champions League	Runners-up	Semi-finals	5–3	2–1	Home	(Saudi Arabia) Al-Ittihad
2011	Champions League	Runners-up	Final	2–2 (2–4 p)	2–2 (a.e.t.)	—	(Qatar) Al-Sadd
2012	Champions League	Group stage	Group H	Third place	1–5	Home	(China) Guangzhou Evergrande
2012	Champions League	Group stage	Group H	Third place	3–1	Away	(China) Guangzhou Evergrande
2012	Champions League	Group stage	Group H	Third place	1–5	Away	(Japan) Kashiwa Reysol
2012	Champions League	Group stage	Group H	Third place	0–2	Home	(Japan) Kashiwa Reysol
2012	Champions League	Group stage	Group H	Third place	2–0	Away	(Thailand) Buriram United
2012	Champions League	Group stage	Group H	Third place	3–2	Home	(Thailand) Buriram United
2013	Champions League	Round of 16	Group F	Runners-up	2–2	Away	(Thailand) Muangthong United
2013	Champions League	Round of 16	Group F	Runners-up	2–0	Home	(Thailand) Muangthong United
2013	Champions League	Round of 16	Group F	Runners-up	1–1	Home	(China) Guangzhou Evergrande
2013	Champions League	Round of 16	Group F	Runners-up	0–0	Away	(China) Guangzhou Evergrande
2013	Champions League	Round of 16	Group F	Runners-up	3–1	Away	(Japan) Urawa Red Diamonds
2013	Champions League	Round of 16	Group F	Runners-up	2–2	Home	(Japan) Urawa Red Diamonds
2013	Champions League	Round of 16	Round of 16	2–5	0–2	Home	(Japan) Kashiwa Reysol
2013	Champions League	Round of 16	Round of 16	2–5	2–3	Away	(Japan) Kashiwa Reysol
2014	Champions League	Round of 16	Group G	Runners-up	3–0	Home	(Japan) Yokohama F. Marinos
2014	Champions League	Round of 16	Group G	Runners-up	1–2	Away	(Japan) Yokohama F. Marinos
2014	Champions League	Round of 16	Group G	Runners-up	2–2	Away	(Australia) Melbourne Victory
2014	Champions League	Round of 16	Group G	Runners-up	0–0	Home	(Australia) Melbourne Victory
2014	Champions League	Round of 16	Group G	Runners-up	1–3	Away	(China) Guangzhou Evergrande
2014	Champions League	Round of 16	Group G	Runners-up	1–0	Home	(China) Guangzhou Evergrande
2014	Champions League	Round of 16	Round of 16	1–3	1–2	Home	(South Korea) Pohang Steelers
2014	Champions League	Round of 16	Round of 16	1–3	0–1	Away	(South Korea) Pohang Steelers
2015	Champions League	Quarter-finals	Group E	Runners-up	0–0	Home	(Japan) Kashiwa Reysol
2015	Champions League	Quarter-finals	Group E	Runners-up	2–3	Away	(Japan) Kashiwa Reysol
2015	Champions League	Quarter-finals	Group E	Runners-up	4–1	Away	(China) Shandong Luneng
2015	Champions League	Quarter-finals	Group E	Runners-up	4–1	Home	(China) Shandong Luneng
2015	Champions League	Quarter-finals	Group E	Runners-up	3–0	Home	(Vietnam) Becamex Binh Duong
2015	Champions League	Quarter-finals	Group E	Runners-up	1–1	Away	(Vietnam) Becamex Binh Duong
2015	Champions League	Quarter-finals	Round of 16	2–1	1–1	Home	(China) Beijing Guoan
2015	Champions League	Quarter-finals	Round of 16	2–1	1–0	Away	(China) Beijing Guoan
2015	Champions League	Quarter-finals	Quarter-finals	2–3	0–0	Home	(Japan) Gamba Osaka
2015	Champions League	Quarter-finals	Quarter-finals	2–3	2–3	Away	(Japan) Gamba Osaka
2016	Champions League	Champions	Group E	Winners	2–1	Home	(Japan) FC Tokyo
2016	Champions League	Champions	Group E	Winners	3–0	Away	(Japan) FC Tokyo
2016	Champions League	Champions	Group E	Winners	2–3	Away	(China) Jiangsu Suning
2016	Champions League	Champions	Group E	Winners	2–2	Home	(China) Jiangsu Suning
2016	Champions League	Champions	Group E	Winners	2–0	Home	(Vietnam) Becamex Binh Duong
2016	Champions League	Champions	Group E	Winners	2–3	Away	(Vietnam) Becamex Binh Duong
2016	Champions League	Champions	Round of 16	3–2	1–1	Away	(Australia) Melbourne Victory
2016	Champions League	Champions	Round of 16	3–2	2–1	Home	(Australia) Melbourne Victory
2016	Champions League	Champions	Quarter-finals	5–0	0–0	Away	(China) Shanghai SIPG
2016	Champions League	Champions	Quarter-finals	5–0	5–0	Home	(China) Shanghai SIPG
2016	Champions League	Champions	Semi-finals	5–3	4–1	Home	(South Korea) FC Seoul
2016	Champions League	Champions	Semi-finals	5–3	1–2	Away	(South Korea) FC Seoul
2016	Champions League	Champions	Final	3–2	2–1	Home	(United Arab Emirates) Al-Ain
2016	Champions League	Champions	Final	3–2	1–1	Away	(United Arab Emirates) Al-Ain
2018	Champions League	Quarter-finals	Group E	Winners	3–2	Home	(Japan) Kashiwa Reysol
2018	Champions League	Quarter-finals	Group E	Winners	2–0	Away	(Japan) Kashiwa Reysol
2018	Champions League	Quarter-finals	Group E	Winners	6–0	Away	(Hong Kong) Kitchee
2018	Champions League	Quarter-finals	Group E	Winners	3–0	Home	(Hong Kong) Kitchee
2018	Champions League	Quarter-finals	Group E	Winners	6–3	Home	(China) Tianjin Quanjian
2018	Champions League	Quarter-finals	Group E	Winners	2–4	Away	(China) Tianjin Quanjian
2018	Champions League	Quarter-finals	Round of 16	4–3	2–3	Away	(Thailand) Buriram United
2018	Champions League	Quarter-finals	Round of 16	4–3	2–0	Home	(Thailand) Buriram United
2018	Champions League	Quarter-finals	Quarter-finals	3–3 (2–4 p)	0–3	Home	(South Korea) Suwon Samsung Bluewings
2018	Champions League	Quarter-finals	Quarter-finals	3–3 (2–4 p)	3–0 (a.e.t.)	Away	(South Korea) Suwon Samsung Bluewings
2019	Champions League	Round of 16	Group G	Winners	3–1	Home	(China) Beijing Guoan
2019	Champions League	Round of 16	Group G	Winners	1–0	Away	(China) Beijing Guoan
2019	Champions League	Round of 16	Group G	Winners	0–1	Away	(Thailand) Buriram United
2019	Champions League	Round of 16	Group G	Winners	0–0	Home	(Thailand) Buriram United
2019	Champions League	Round of 16	Group G	Winners	1–0	Away	(Japan) Urawa Red Diamonds
2019	Champions League	Round of 16	Group G	Winners	2–1	Home	(Japan) Urawa Red Diamonds
2019	Champions League	Round of 16	Round of 16	2–2 (3–5 p)	1–1	Away	(China) Shanghai SIPG
2019	Champions League	Round of 16	Round of 16	2–2 (3–5 p)	1–1 (a.e.t.)	Home	(China) Shanghai SIPG
2020	Champions League	Group stage	Group H	Third place	1–2	—	(Japan) Yokohama F. Marinos
2020	Champions League	Group stage	Group H	Third place	1–4	—	(Japan) Yokohama F. Marinos
2020	Champions League	Group stage	Group H	Third place	1–2	—	(China) Shanghai SIPG
2020	Champions League	Group stage	Group H	Third place	2–0	—	(China) Shanghai SIPG
2020	Champions League	Group stage	Group H	Third place	1–0	—	(Australia) Sydney FC
2020	Champions League	Group stage	Group H	Third place	2–2	—	(Australia) Sydney FC
2021	Champions League	Quarter-finals	Group H	Winners	2–1	—	(Thailand) Chiangrai United
2021	Champions League	Quarter-finals	Group H	Winners	3–1	—	(Thailand) Chiangrai United
2021	Champions League	Quarter-finals	Group H	Winners	2–2	—	(Japan) Gamba Osaka
2021	Champions League	Quarter-finals	Group H	Winners	2–1	—	(Japan) Gamba Osaka
2021	Champions League	Quarter-finals	Group H	Winners	9–0	—	(Singapore) Tampines Rovers
2021	Champions League	Quarter-finals	Group H	Winners	4–0	—	(Singapore) Tampines Rovers
2021	Champions League	Quarter-finals	Round of 16	1–1 (4–2 p)	1–1 (a.e.t.)	—	(Thailand) BG Pathum United
2021	Champions League	Quarter-finals	Quarter-finals	2–3	2–3 (a.e.t.)	—	(South Korea) Ulsan Hyundai
2022	Champions League	Semi-finals	Group H	Runners-up	0–0	—	(Australia) Sydney FC
2022	Champions League	Semi-finals	Group H	Runners-up	3–2	—	(Australia) Sydney FC
2022	Champions League	Semi-finals	Group H	Runners-up	1–0	—	(Japan) Yokohama F. Marinos
2022	Champions League	Semi-finals	Group H	Runners-up	1–1	—	(Japan) Yokohama F. Marinos
2022	Champions League	Semi-finals	Group H	Runners-up	1–0	—	(Vietnam) Hoang Anh Gia Lai
2022	Champions League	Semi-finals	Group H	Runners-up	1–1	—	(Vietnam) Hoang Anh Gia Lai
2022	Champions League	Semi-finals	Round of 16	2–1	2–1 (a.e.t.)	—	(South Korea) Daegu FC
2022	Champions League	Semi-finals	Quarter-finals	3–1	3–1 (a.e.t.)	—	(Japan) Vissel Kobe
2022	Champions League	Semi-finals	Semi-finals	2–2 (1–3 p)	2–2 (a.e.t.)	—	(Japan) Urawa Red Diamonds
2023–24	Champions League	Quarter-finals	Group F	Runners-up	2–1	Home	(Hong Kong) Kitchee
2023–24	Champions League	Quarter-finals	Group F	Runners-up	2–1	Away	(Hong Kong) Kitchee
2023–24	Champions League	Quarter-finals	Group F	Runners-up	2–3	Away	(Thailand) Bangkok United
2023–24	Champions League	Quarter-finals	Group F	Runners-up	3–2	Home	(Thailand) Bangkok United
2023–24	Champions League	Quarter-finals	Group F	Runners-up	3–0	Home	(Singapore) Lion City Sailors
2023–24	Champions League	Quarter-finals	Group F	Runners-up	0–2	Away	(Singapore) Lion City Sailors
2023–24	Champions League	Quarter-finals	Round of 16	3–1	2–0	Home	(South Korea) Pohang Steelers
2023–24	Champions League	Quarter-finals	Round of 16	3–1	1–1	Away	(South Korea) Pohang Steelers
2023–24	Champions League	Quarter-finals	Quarter-finals	1–2	1–1	Home	(South Korea) Ulsan HD
2023–24	Champions League	Quarter-finals	Quarter-finals	1–2	0–1	Away	(South Korea) Ulsan HD
2024–25	Champions League Two	Quarter-finals	Group H	Winners	6–0	Away	(Philippines) Dynamic Herb Cebu
2024–25	Champions League Two	Quarter-finals	Group H	Winners	4–0	Home	(Philippines) Dynamic Herb Cebu
2024–25	Champions League Two	Quarter-finals	Group H	Winners	4–1	Home	(Thailand) Muangthong United
2024–25	Champions League Two	Quarter-finals	Group H	Winners	0–1	Away	(Thailand) Muangthong United
2024–25	Champions League Two	Quarter-finals	Group H	Winners	1–2	Away	(Malaysia) Selangor
2024–25	Champions League Two	Quarter-finals	Group H	Winners	1–0	Home	(Malaysia) Selangor
2024–25	Champions League Two	Quarter-finals	Round of 16	5–0	4–0	Away	(Thailand) Port
2024–25	Champions League Two	Quarter-finals	Round of 16	5–0	1–0	Home	(Thailand) Port
2024–25	Champions League Two	Quarter-finals	Quarter-finals	2–5	0–2	Home	(Australia) Sydney FC
2024–25	Champions League Two	Quarter-finals	Quarter-finals	2–5	2–3	Away	(Australia) Sydney FC

=== Jeonnam Dragons ===
Jeonnam Dragons records
Competition	Part	Pld	W	D	L	Win %	Pts	Best result
Champions League Elite	3	18	6	6	6	33.33	24	Group stage (2007, 2008, 2022)
Cup Winners' Cup	1	6	5	0	1	83.33	15	Runners-up (1998–99)
Total	4	24	11	6	7	45.83	39	0 title

List of matches played by Jeonnam Dragons
Season	Competition	Result	Round	Aggregate	Score	Venue	Opponent
1998–99	Cup Winners' Cup	Runners-up	Round of 16	4–0	2–0	Away	(China) Beijing Guoan
1998–99	Cup Winners' Cup	Runners-up	Round of 16	4–0	2–0	Home	(China) Beijing Guoan
1998–99	Cup Winners' Cup	Runners-up	Quarter-finals	7–1	3–0	Away	(Hong Kong) Happy Valley
1998–99	Cup Winners' Cup	Runners-up	Quarter-finals	7–1	4–1	Home	(Hong Kong) Happy Valley
1998–99	Cup Winners' Cup	Runners-up	Semi-finals	4–1	4–1	—	(Japan) Kashima Antlers
1998–99	Cup Winners' Cup	Runners-up	Final	2–3	2–3 (a.e.t.)	—	(Saudi Arabia) Al-Ittihad
2007	Champions League	Group stage	Group F	Runners-up	0–0	Away	(Thailand) Bangkok University
2007	Champions League	Group stage	Group F	Runners-up	3–2	Home	(Thailand) Bangkok University
2007	Champions League	Group stage	Group F	Runners-up	2–0	Home	(Indonesia) Arema
2007	Champions League	Group stage	Group F	Runners-up	1–0	Away	(Indonesia) Arema
2007	Champions League	Group stage	Group F	Runners-up	1–3	Home	(Japan) Kawasaki Frontale
2007	Champions League	Group stage	Group F	Runners-up	0–3	Away	(Japan) Kawasaki Frontale
2008	Champions League	Group stage	Group G	Third place	0–2	Away	(Australia) Melbourne Victory
2008	Champions League	Group stage	Group G	Third place	1–1	Home	(Australia) Melbourne Victory
2008	Champions League	Group stage	Group G	Third place	3–4	Home	(Japan) Gamba Osaka
2008	Champions League	Group stage	Group G	Third place	1–1	Away	(Japan) Gamba Osaka
2008	Champions League	Group stage	Group G	Third place	1–0	Home	(Thailand) Chonburi
2008	Champions League	Group stage	Group G	Third place	2–2	Away	(Thailand) Chonburi
2022	Champions League	Group stage	Group G	Third place	1–0	—	(Philippines) United City
2022	Champions League	Group stage	Group G	Third place	2–0	—	(Philippines) United City
2022	Champions League	Group stage	Group G	Third place	0–2	—	(Thailand) BG Pathum United
2022	Champions League	Group stage	Group G	Third place	0–0	—	(Thailand) BG Pathum United
2022	Champions League	Group stage	Group G	Third place	1–2	—	(Australia) Melbourne City
2022	Champions League	Group stage	Group G	Third place	1–1	—	(Australia) Melbourne City

=== Korea Tungsten ===
Korea Tungsten records
Competition	Part	Pld	W	D	L	Win %	Pts	Best result
Champions League Elite	1	2	0	1	1	0.00	1	Third place (1967)

List of matches played by Korea Tungsten
Season	Competition	Result	Round	Aggregate	Score	Venue	Opponent
1967	Champion Club Tournament	Third place	Semi-finals	0–1	0–0	Home	(Malaysia) Selangor
1967	Champion Club Tournament	Third place	Semi-finals	0–1	0–1	Away	(Malaysia) Selangor

=== Pohang Steelers ===
Pohang Atoms and Pohang Steelers records
Competition	Part	Pld	W	D	L	Win %	Pts	Best result
Champions League Elite	13	105	52	29	24	49.52	185	Champions (1996–97, 1997–98, 2009)
Champions League Elite qualification	—	2	2	0	0	100.00	6	—
Champions League Two	1	8	4	2	2	50.00	14	Round of 16 (2025–26)
Super Cup	2	4	0	3	1	0.00	3	Runners-up (1997, 1998)
Total	16	119	58	34	27	48.74	208	3 titles

List of matches played by Pohang Atoms and Pohang Steelers
Season	Competition	Result	Round	Aggregate	Score	Venue	Opponent
1996–97	Club Championship	Champions	First round	4–1	0–1	Away	(Indonesia) PSM Makassar
1996–97	Club Championship	Champions	First round	4–1	4–0	Home	(Indonesia) PSM Makassar
1996–97	Club Championship	Champions	Second round	5–1	3–1	Away	(Thailand) Thai Farmers Bank
1996–97	Club Championship	Champions	Second round	5–1	2–0	Home	(Thailand) Thai Farmers Bank
1996–97	Club Championship	Champions	Group East	Runners-up	2–2	—	(Japan) Yokohama Marinos
1996–97	Club Championship	Champions	Group East	Runners-up	6–0	—	(Maldives) New Radiant
1996–97	Club Championship	Champions	Group East	Runners-up	0–0	—	(South Korea) Cheonan Ilhwa Chunma
1996–97	Club Championship	Champions	Semi-finals	3–1	3–1	—	(Iran) Persepolis
1996–97	Club Championship	Champions	Final	2–1	2–1 (a.e.t.)	—	(South Korea) Cheonan Ilhwa Chunma
1997	Super Cup	Runners-up	—	1–2	0–1	Away	(Saudi Arabia) Al-Hilal
1997	Super Cup	Runners-up	—	1–2	1–1	Home	(Saudi Arabia) Al-Hilal
1997–98	Club Championship	Champions	First round	13–0	11–0	Home	(Bangladesh) Mohammedan SC
1997–98	Club Championship	Champions	First round	13–0	2–0	Away	(Bangladesh) Mohammedan SC
1997–98	Club Championship	Champions	Second round	15–0	12–0	Home	(Maldives) Victory SC
1997–98	Club Championship	Champions	Second round	15–0	3–0	Away	(Maldives) Victory SC
1997–98	Club Championship	Champions	Group East	Winners	2–1	—	(Japan) Kashima Antlers
1997–98	Club Championship	Champions	Group East	Winners	1–2	—	(China) Dalian Wanda
1997–98	Club Championship	Champions	Group East	Winners	5–1	—	(Myanmar) Finance and Revenue
1997–98	Club Championship	Champions	Semi-finals	1–0	1–0	—	(Saudi Arabia) Al-Hilal
1997–98	Club Championship	Champions	Final	0–0 (6–5 p)	0–0 (a.e.t.)	—	(China) Dalian Wanda
1998	Super Cup	Runners-up	—	1–1 (a)	1–1	Home	(Saudi Arabia) Al-Nassr
1998	Super Cup	Runners-up	—	1–1 (a)	0–0	Away	(Saudi Arabia) Al-Nassr
1998–99	Club Championship	Group stage	First round	6–0	2–0	Home	(Vietnam) Cảng Sài Gòn
1998–99	Club Championship	Group stage	First round	6–0	4–0	Away	(Vietnam) Cảng Sài Gòn
1998–99	Club Championship	Group stage	Second round	10–1	6–0	Home	(Malaysia) Selangor
1998–99	Club Championship	Group stage	Second round	10–1	4–1	Away	(Malaysia) Selangor
1998–99	Club Championship	Group stage	Group East	Third place	1–1	—	(Japan) Júbilo Iwata
1998–99	Club Championship	Group stage	Group East	Third place	1–1	—	(South Korea) Busan Daewoo Royals
1998–99	Club Championship	Group stage	Group East	Third place	1–1	—	(China) Dalian Wanda
2008	Champions League	Group stage	Group E	Third place	0–2	Home	(Australia) Adelaide United
2008	Champions League	Group stage	Group E	Third place	0–1	Away	(Australia) Adelaide United
2008	Champions League	Group stage	Group E	Third place	4–1	Away	(Vietnam) Becamex Binh Duong
2008	Champions League	Group stage	Group E	Third place	0–0	Home	(Vietnam) Becamex Binh Duong
2008	Champions League	Group stage	Group E	Third place	0–1	Away	(China) Changchun Yatai
2008	Champions League	Group stage	Group E	Third place	2–2	Home	(China) Changchun Yatai
2009	Champions League	Champions	Group H	Winners	0–0	Away	(Australia) Central Coast Mariners
2009	Champions League	Champions	Group H	Winners	3–2	Home	(Australia) Central Coast Mariners
2009	Champions League	Champions	Group H	Winners	1–1	Home	(Japan) Kawasaki Frontale
2009	Champions League	Champions	Group H	Winners	2–0	Away	(Japan) Kawasaki Frontale
2009	Champions League	Champions	Group H	Winners	1–0	Home	(China) Tianjin TEDA
2009	Champions League	Champions	Group H	Winners	0–0	Away	(China) Tianjin TEDA
2009	Champions League	Champions	Round of 16	6–0	6–0	—	(Australia) Newcastle Jets
2009	Champions League	Champions	Quarter-finals	5–4	1–3	Away	(Uzbekistan) Bunyodkor
2009	Champions League	Champions	Quarter-finals	5–4	4–1 (a.e.t.)	Home	(Uzbekistan) Bunyodkor
2009	Champions League	Champions	Semi-finals	4–1	2–0	Home	(Qatar) Umm-Salal
2009	Champions League	Champions	Semi-finals	4–1	2–1	Away	(Qatar) Umm-Salal
2009	Champions League	Champions	Final	2–1	2–1	—	(Saudi Arabia) Al-Ittihad
2010	Champions League	Quarter-finals	Group H	Runners-up	0–1	Away	(Australia) Adelaide United
2010	Champions League	Quarter-finals	Group H	Runners-up	0–0	Home	(Australia) Adelaide United
2010	Champions League	Quarter-finals	Group H	Runners-up	2–1	Home	(Japan) Sanfrecce Hiroshima
2010	Champions League	Quarter-finals	Group H	Runners-up	3–4	Away	(Japan) Sanfrecce Hiroshima
2010	Champions League	Quarter-finals	Group H	Runners-up	1–0	Home	(China) Shandong Luneng
2010	Champions League	Quarter-finals	Group H	Runners-up	2–1	Away	(China) Shandong Luneng
2010	Champions League	Quarter-finals	Round of 16	1–0	1–0	—	(Japan) Kashima Antlers
2010	Champions League	Quarter-finals	Quarter-finals	2–3	1–2	Away	(Iran) Zob Ahan
2010	Champions League	Quarter-finals	Quarter-finals	2–3	1–1	Home	(Iran) Zob Ahan
2012	Champions League	Group stage	Qualifying play-offs	2–0	2–0	—	(Thailand) Chonburi
2012	Champions League	Group stage	Group E	Third place	3–0	Away	(Japan) Gamba Osaka
2012	Champions League	Group stage	Group E	Third place	2–0	Home	(Japan) Gamba Osaka
2012	Champions League	Group stage	Group E	Third place	0–2	Home	(Uzbekistan) Bunyodkor
2012	Champions League	Group stage	Group E	Third place	0–1	Away	(Uzbekistan) Bunyodkor
2012	Champions League	Group stage	Group E	Third place	1–0	Home	(Australia) Adelaide United
2012	Champions League	Group stage	Group E	Third place	0–1	Away	(Australia) Adelaide United
2013	Champions League	Group stage	Group G	Third place	0–0	Home	(China) Beijing Guoan
2013	Champions League	Group stage	Group G	Third place	0–2	Away	(China) Beijing Guoan
2013	Champions League	Group stage	Group G	Third place	2–2	Away	(Uzbekistan) Bunyodkor
2013	Champions League	Group stage	Group G	Third place	1–1	Home	(Uzbekistan) Bunyodkor
2013	Champions League	Group stage	Group G	Third place	1–0	Away	(Japan) Sanfrecce Hiroshima
2013	Champions League	Group stage	Group G	Third place	1–1	Home	(Japan) Sanfrecce Hiroshima
2014	Champions League	Quarter-finals	Group E	Winners	1–1	Home	(Japan) Cerezo Osaka
2014	Champions League	Quarter-finals	Group E	Winners	2–0	Away	(Japan) Cerezo Osaka
2014	Champions League	Quarter-finals	Group E	Winners	2–1	Away	(Thailand) Buriram United
2014	Champions League	Quarter-finals	Group E	Winners	0–0	Home	(Thailand) Buriram United
2014	Champions League	Quarter-finals	Group E	Winners	2–2	Home	(China) Shandong Luneng
2014	Champions League	Quarter-finals	Group E	Winners	4–2	Away	(China) Shandong Luneng
2014	Champions League	Quarter-finals	Round of 16	3–1	2–1	Away	(South Korea) Jeonbuk Hyundai Motors
2014	Champions League	Quarter-finals	Round of 16	3–1	1–0	Home	(South Korea) Jeonbuk Hyundai Motors
2014	Champions League	Quarter-finals	Quarter-finals	0–0 (0–3 p)	0–0	Home	(South Korea) FC Seoul
2014	Champions League	Quarter-finals	Quarter-finals	0–0 (0–3 p)	0–0 (a.e.t.)	Away	(South Korea) FC Seoul
2016	Champions League	Group stage	Qualifying play-offs	3–0	3–0	—	(Vietnam) Hanoi FC
2016	Champions League	Group stage	Group H	Fourth place	0–0	Away	(China) Guangzhou Evergrande
2016	Champions League	Group stage	Group H	Fourth place	0–2	Home	(China) Guangzhou Evergrande
2016	Champions League	Group stage	Group H	Fourth place	1–0	Home	(Japan) Urawa Red Diamonds
2016	Champions League	Group stage	Group H	Fourth place	1–1	Away	(Japan) Urawa Red Diamonds
2016	Champions League	Group stage	Group H	Fourth place	0–1	Home	(Australia) Sydney FC
2016	Champions League	Group stage	Group H	Fourth place	0–1	Away	(Australia) Sydney FC
2021	Champions League	Runners-up	Group G	Runners-up	2–0	—	(Thailand) Ratchaburi Mitr Phol
2021	Champions League	Runners-up	Group G	Runners-up	0–0	—	(Thailand) Ratchaburi Mitr Phol
2021	Champions League	Runners-up	Group G	Runners-up	0–3	—	(Japan) Nagoya Grampus
2021	Champions League	Runners-up	Group G	Runners-up	1–1	—	(Japan) Nagoya Grampus
2021	Champions League	Runners-up	Group G	Runners-up	4–1	—	(Malaysia) Johor Darul Ta'zim
2021	Champions League	Runners-up	Group G	Runners-up	2–0	—	(Malaysia) Johor Darul Ta'zim
2021	Champions League	Runners-up	Round of 16	1–0	1–0	—	(Japan) Cerezo Osaka
2021	Champions League	Runners-up	Quarter-finals	3–0	3–0	—	(Japan) Nagoya Grampus
2021	Champions League	Runners-up	Semi-finals	1–1 (5–4 p)	1–1 (a.e.t.)	—	(South Korea) Ulsan Hyundai
2021	Champions League	Runners-up	Final	0–2	0–2	—	(Saudi Arabia) Al-Hilal
2023–24	Champions League	Round of 16	Group J	Winners	4–2	Away	(Vietnam) Hanoi FC
2023–24	Champions League	Round of 16	Group J	Winners	2–0	Home	(Vietnam) Hanoi FC
2023–24	Champions League	Round of 16	Group J	Winners	3–1	Home	(China) Wuhan Three Towns
2023–24	Champions League	Round of 16	Group J	Winners	1–1	Away	(China) Wuhan Three Towns
2023–24	Champions League	Round of 16	Group J	Winners	2–0	Away	(Japan) Urawa Red Diamonds
2023–24	Champions League	Round of 16	Group J	Winners	2–1	Home	(Japan) Urawa Red Diamonds
2023–24	Champions League	Round of 16	Round of 16	1–3	0–2	Away	(South Korea) Jeonbuk Hyundai Motors
2023–24	Champions League	Round of 16	Round of 16	1–3	1–1	Home	(South Korea) Jeonbuk Hyundai Motors
2024–25	Champions League Elite	League stage	League East	Ninth place	1–4	Away	(China) Shanghai Shenhua
2024–25	Champions League Elite	League stage	League East	Ninth place	3–0	Home	(China) Shanghai Port
2024–25	Champions League Elite	League stage	League East	Ninth place	0–1	Away	(Thailand) Buriram United
2024–25	Champions League Elite	League stage	League East	Ninth place	~~4–2~~ Cancelled	Home	(China) Shandong Taishan
2024–25	Champions League Elite	League stage	League East	Ninth place	0–2	Away	(Japan) Yokohama F. Marinos
2024–25	Champions League Elite	League stage	League East	Ninth place	3–1	Home	(Japan) Vissel Kobe
2024–25	Champions League Elite	League stage	League East	Ninth place	0–4	Home	(Japan) Kawasaki Frontale
2024–25	Champions League Elite	League stage	League East	Ninth place	2–5	Away	(Malaysia) Johor Darul Ta'zim
2025–26	Champions League Two	Round of 16	Group H	Runners-up	1–0	Away	(Thailand) BG Pathum United
2025–26	Champions League Two	Round of 16	Group H	Runners-up	2–0	Home	(Thailand) BG Pathum United
2025–26	Champions League Two	Round of 16	Group H	Runners-up	2–0	Home	(Philippines) Kaya–Iloilo
2025–26	Champions League Two	Round of 16	Group H	Runners-up	1–0	Away	(Philippines) Kaya–Iloilo
2025–26	Champions League Two	Round of 16	Group H	Runners-up	0–1	Away	(Singapore) Tampines Rovers
2025–26	Champions League Two	Round of 16	Group H	Runners-up	1–1	Home	(Singapore) Tampines Rovers
2025–26	Champions League Two	Round of 16	Round of 16	2–3	1–1	Home	(Japan) Gamba Osaka
2025–26	Champions League Two	Round of 16	Round of 16	2–3	1–2	Away	(Japan) Gamba Osaka

=== Seongnam FC ===
(Cheonan/Seongnam) Ilhwa Chunma and Seongnam FC records
Competition	Part	Pld	W	D	L	Win %	Pts	Best result
Champions League Elite	9	77	51	12	14	66.23	165	Champions (1995, 2010)
Cup Winners' Cup	1	2	1	0	1	50.00	3	Round of 16 (2000–01)
Super Cup	1	2	2	0	0	100.00	6	Champions (1996)
Total	11	81	54	12	15	66.67	174	3 titles

List of matches played by (Cheonan/Seongnam) Ilhwa Chunma and Seongnam FC
Season	Competition	Result	Round	Aggregate	Score	Venue	Opponent
1994–95	Club Championship	Fourth place	First round	10–4	5–3	Home	(Malaysia) Kedah
1994–95	Club Championship	Fourth place	First round	10–4	5–1	Away	(Malaysia) Kedah
1994–95	Club Championship	Fourth place	Second round	5–1	1–0	Away	(Indonesia) Pelita Jaya
1994–95	Club Championship	Fourth place	Second round	5–1	4–1	Home	(Indonesia) Pelita Jaya
1994–95	Club Championship	Fourth place	Group East	Winners	3–1	—	(Japan) Verdy Kawasaki
1994–95	Club Championship	Fourth place	Group East	Winners	3–1	—	(China) Liaoning FC
1994–95	Club Championship	Fourth place	Group East	Winners	1–0	—	(Thailand) Thai Farmers Bank
1994–95	Club Championship	Fourth place	Semi-finals	0–2	0–2	—	(Qatar) Al-Arabi
1994–95	Club Championship	Fourth place	Third place match	0–1	0–1	—	(Uzbekistan) FK Neftchi Farg'ona
1995	Club Championship	Champions	First round	8–0	5–0	Home	(Macau) Lam Pak
1995	Club Championship	Champions	First round	8–0	Awarded (3–0)	Away	(Macau) Lam Pak
1995	Club Championship	Champions	Second round	5–2	3–2	Away	(Malaysia) Pahang
1995	Club Championship	Champions	Second round	5–2	2–0	Home	(Malaysia) Pahang
1995	Club Championship	Champions	Group East	Winners	1–1	—	(Thailand) Thai Farmers Bank
1995	Club Championship	Champions	Group East	Winners	5–2	—	(Indonesia) Persib Bandung
1995	Club Championship	Champions	Group East	Winners	1–0	—	(Japan) Verdy Kawasaki
1995	Club Championship	Champions	Semi-finals	1–0	1–0 (a.e.t.)	—	(Iran) Saipa
1995	Club Championship	Champions	Final	1–0	1–0 (a.e.t.)	—	(Saudi Arabia) Al-Nassr
1996	Super Cup	Champions	—	6–3	5–3	Home	(Japan) Bellmare Hiratsuka
1996	Super Cup	Champions	—	6–3	1–0	Away	(Japan) Bellmare Hiratsuka
1996–97	Club Championship	Runners-up	Second round	1–0	0–0	Home	(China) Shanghai Shenhua
1996–97	Club Championship	Runners-up	Second round	1–0	1–0	Away	(China) Shanghai Shenhua
1996–97	Club Championship	Runners-up	Group East	Winners	9–0	—	(Maldives) New Radiant
1996–97	Club Championship	Runners-up	Group East	Winners	3–2	—	(Japan) Yokohama Marinos
1996–97	Club Championship	Runners-up	Group East	Winners	0–0	—	(South Korea) Pohang Steelers
1996–97	Club Championship	Runners-up	Semi-finals	1–0	1–0	—	(Iraq) Al-Zawraa
1996–97	Club Championship	Runners-up	Final	1–2	1–2 (a.e.t.)	—	(South Korea) Pohang Steelers
2000–01	Cup Winners' Cup	Round of 16	Round of 16	1–2	0–2	Away	(China) Dalian Shide
2000–01	Cup Winners' Cup	Round of 16	Round of 16	1–2	1–0	Home	(China) Dalian Shide
2002–03	Champions League	Group stage	Group B	Runners-up	6–0	—	(Thailand) Osotsapa
2002–03	Champions League	Group stage	Group B	Runners-up	2–1	—	(Japan) Shimizu S-Pulse
2002–03	Champions League	Group stage	Group B	Runners-up	1–3	—	(China) Dalian Shide
2004	Champions League	Runners-up	Group G	Winners	2–1	Away	(Indonesia) Persik Kediri
2004	Champions League	Runners-up	Group G	Winners	15–0	Home	(Indonesia) Persik Kediri
2004	Champions League	Runners-up	Group G	Winners	2–0	Home	(Vietnam) Bình Định
2004	Champions League	Runners-up	Group G	Winners	3–1	Away	(Vietnam) Bình Định
2004	Champions League	Runners-up	Group G	Winners	2–1	Away	(Japan) Yokohama F. Marinos
2004	Champions League	Runners-up	Group G	Winners	0–1	Home	(Japan) Yokohama F. Marinos
2004	Champions League	Runners-up	Quarter-finals	11–2	6–0	Home	(United Arab Emirates) Sharjah
2004	Champions League	Runners-up	Quarter-finals	11–2	5–2	Away	(United Arab Emirates) Sharjah
2004	Champions League	Runners-up	Semi-finals	2–0	0–0	Home	(Uzbekistan) Pakhtakor
2004	Champions League	Runners-up	Semi-finals	2–0	2–0	Away	(Uzbekistan) Pakhtakor
2004	Champions League	Runners-up	Final	3–6	3–1	Away	(Saudi Arabia) Al-Ittihad
2004	Champions League	Runners-up	Final	3–6	0–5	Home	(Saudi Arabia) Al-Ittihad
2007	Champions League	Semi-finals	Group G	Winners	4–1	Home	(Vietnam) Dong Tam Long An
2007	Champions League	Semi-finals	Group G	Winners	2–1	Away	(Vietnam) Dong Tam Long An
2007	Champions League	Semi-finals	Group G	Winners	1–2	Away	(China) Shandong Luneng Taishan
2007	Champions League	Semi-finals	Group G	Winners	3–0	Home	(China) Shandong Luneng Taishan
2007	Champions League	Semi-finals	Group G	Winners	2–2	Away	(Australia) Adelaide United
2007	Champions League	Semi-finals	Group G	Winners	1–0	Home	(Australia) Adelaide United
2007	Champions League	Semi-finals	Quarter-finals	4–1	2–1	Home	(Syria) Al-Karamah
2007	Champions League	Semi-finals	Quarter-finals	4–1	2–0	Away	(Syria) Al-Karamah
2007	Champions League	Semi-finals	Semi-finals	4–4 (3–5 p)	2–2	Home	(Japan) Urawa Red Diamonds
2007	Champions League	Semi-finals	Semi-finals	4–4 (3–5 p)	2–2 (a.e.t.)	Away	(Japan) Urawa Red Diamonds
2010	Champions League	Champions	Group E	Winners	2–0	Home	(Japan) Kawasaki Frontale
2010	Champions League	Champions	Group E	Winners	0–3	Away	(Japan) Kawasaki Frontale
2010	Champions League	Champions	Group E	Winners	2–0	Away	(Australia) Melbourne Victory
2010	Champions League	Champions	Group E	Winners	3–2	Home	(Australia) Melbourne Victory
2010	Champions League	Champions	Group E	Winners	3–1	Home	(China) Beijing Guoan
2010	Champions League	Champions	Group E	Winners	1–0	Away	(China) Beijing Guoan
2010	Champions League	Champions	Round of 16	3–0	3–0	—	(Japan) Gamba Osaka
2010	Champions League	Champions	Quarter-finals	4–3	4–1	Home	(South Korea) Suwon Samsung Bluewings
2010	Champions League	Champions	Quarter-finals	4–3	0–2	Away	(South Korea) Suwon Samsung Bluewings
2010	Champions League	Champions	Semi-finals	4–4 (a)	3–4	Away	(Saudi Arabia) Al-Shabab
2010	Champions League	Champions	Semi-finals	4–4 (a)	1–0	Home	(Saudi Arabia) Al-Shabab
2010	Champions League	Champions	Final	3–1	3–1	—	(Iran) Zob Ahan
2012	Champions League	Round of 16	Group G	Winners	2–2	Away	(Japan) Nagoya Grampus
2012	Champions League	Round of 16	Group G	Winners	1–1	Home	(Japan) Nagoya Grampus
2012	Champions League	Round of 16	Group G	Winners	1–1	Home	(China) Tianjin TEDA
2012	Champions League	Round of 16	Group G	Winners	3–0	Away	(China) Tianjin TEDA
2012	Champions League	Round of 16	Group G	Winners	1–1	Away	(Australia) Central Coast Mariners
2012	Champions League	Round of 16	Group G	Winners	5–0	Home	(Australia) Central Coast Mariners
2012	Champions League	Round of 16	Round of 16	0–1	0–1	—	(Uzbekistan) Bunyodkor
2015	Champions League	Round of 16	Group F	Runners-up	1–2	Away	(Thailand) Buriram United
2015	Champions League	Round of 16	Group F	Runners-up	2–1	Home	(Thailand) Buriram United
2015	Champions League	Round of 16	Group F	Runners-up	2–0	Home	(Japan) Gamba Osaka
2015	Champions League	Round of 16	Group F	Runners-up	1–2	Away	(Japan) Gamba Osaka
2015	Champions League	Round of 16	Group F	Runners-up	1–0	Away	(China) Guangzhou R&F
2015	Champions League	Round of 16	Group F	Runners-up	0–0	Home	(China) Guangzhou R&F
2015	Champions League	Round of 16	Round of 16	2–3	2–1	Home	(China) Guangzhou Evergrande
2015	Champions League	Round of 16	Round of 16	2–3	0–2	Away	(China) Guangzhou Evergrande

=== ROK Army ===
ROK Army records
Competition	Part	Pld	W	D	L	Win %	Pts	Best result
Champions League Elite	1	6	3	0	3	50.00	9	Fourth place (1971)

List of matches played by ROK Army
Season	Competition	Result	Round	Aggregate	Score	Venue	Opponent
1971	Champion Club Tournament	Fourth place	Group allocation match	2–1	2–1	—	(Thailand) Bangkok Bank
1971	Champion Club Tournament	Fourth place	Group A	Runners-up	1–2	—	(Iran) Taj
1971	Champion Club Tournament	Fourth place	Group A	Runners-up	3–0	—	(Malaysia) Perak
1971	Champion Club Tournament	Fourth place	Group A	Runners-up	1–0	—	(Kuwait) Al-Arabi
1971	Champion Club Tournament	Fourth place	Semi-finals	0–2	0–2	—	(Israel) Maccabi Tel Aviv
1971	Champion Club Tournament	Fourth place	Third place match	2–3	2–3	—	(Iran) Taj

=== Suwon FC Women ===
Suwon FC Women records
Competition	Part	Pld	W	D	L	Win %	Pts	Best result
Women's Champions League	1	5	2	1	2	40.00	7	Semi-finals (2025–26)

List of matches played by Suwon FC Women
Season	Competition	Result	Round	Aggregate	Score	Venue	Opponent
2025–26	Women's Champions League	Semi-finals	Group C	Third place	5–0	—	(Myanmar) ISPE
2025–26	Women's Champions League	Semi-finals	Group C	Third place	0–3	—	(North Korea) Naegohyang
2025–26	Women's Champions League	Semi-finals	Group C	Third place	0–0	—	(Japan) Tokyo Verdy Beleza
2025–26	Women's Champions League	Semi-finals	Quarter-finals	4–0	4–0	—	(China) Wuhan Jianghan University
2025–26	Women's Champions League	Semi-finals	Semi-finals	1–2	1–2	—	(North Korea) Naegohyang

=== Suwon Samsung Bluewings ===
Suwon Samsung Bluewings records
Competition	Part	Pld	W	D	L	Win %	Pts	Best result
Champions League Elite	13	100	49	28	23	49.00	175	Champions (2000–01, 2001–02)
Champions League Elite qualification	—	1	1	0	0	100.00	3	—
Cup Winners' Cup	1	8	7	0	1	87.50	21	Runners-up (1997–98)
Super Cup	2	4	2	1	1	50.00	7	Champions (2001, 2002)
Total	16	113	59	29	25	52.21	206	4 titles

List of matches played by Suwon Samsung Bluewings
Season	Competition	Result	Round	Aggregate	Score	Venue	Opponent
1997–98	Cup Winners' Cup	Runners-up	First round	9–1	5–1	Home	(Vietnam) Customs
1997–98	Cup Winners' Cup	Runners-up	First round	9–1	4–0	Away	(Vietnam) Customs
1997–98	Cup Winners' Cup	Runners-up	Round of 16	8–0	2–0	Away	Singapore Armed Forces
1997–98	Cup Winners' Cup	Runners-up	Round of 16	8–0	6–0	Home	Singapore Armed Forces
1997–98	Cup Winners' Cup	Runners-up	Quarter-finals	13–0	1–0	Away	(Indonesia) PSM Makassar
1997–98	Cup Winners' Cup	Runners-up	Quarter-finals	13–0	12–0	Home	(Indonesia) PSM Makassar
1997–98	Cup Winners' Cup	Runners-up	Semi-finals	5–0	5–0	—	(China) Beijing Guoan
1997–98	Cup Winners' Cup	Runners-up	Final	0–1	0–1	—	(Saudi Arabia) Al-Nassr
1999–2000	Club Championship	Fourth place	First round	9–4	3–2	Away	(Indonesia) PSIS Semarang
1999–2000	Club Championship	Fourth place	First round	9–4	6–2	Home	(Indonesia) PSIS Semarang
1999–2000	Club Championship	Fourth place	Second round	7–1	1–1	Away	(Vietnam) Thể Công
1999–2000	Club Championship	Fourth place	Second round	7–1	6–0	Home	(Vietnam) Thể Công
1999–2000	Club Championship	Fourth place	Group East	Runners-up	1–1	—	(Japan) Kashima Antlers
1999–2000	Club Championship	Fourth place	Group East	Runners-up	4–0	—	(Thailand) Sinthana FC
1999–2000	Club Championship	Fourth place	Group East	Runners-up	0–1	—	(Japan) Júbilo Iwata
1999–2000	Club Championship	Fourth place	Semi-finals	0–1	0–1	—	(Saudi Arabia) Al-Hilal
1999–2000	Club Championship	Fourth place	Third place match	0–1	0–1	—	(Iran) Persepolis
2000–01	Club Championship	Champions	Second round	2–1	2–1	Home	(Maldives) Hurriyya
2000–01	Club Championship	Champions	Second round	2–1	0–0	Away	(Maldives) Hurriyya
2000–01	Club Championship	Champions	Group East	Runners-up	0–3	—	(Japan) Júbilo Iwata
2000–01	Club Championship	Champions	Group East	Runners-up	8–1	—	(Indonesia) PSM Makassar
2000–01	Club Championship	Champions	Group East	Runners-up	6–0	—	(China) Shandong Luneng
2000–01	Club Championship	Champions	Semi-finals	2–1	2–1	—	(Iran) Persepolis
2000–01	Club Championship	Champions	Final	1–0	1–0	—	(Japan) Júbilo Iwata
2001	Super Cup	Champions	—	4–3	2–2	Home	(Saudi Arabia) Al-Shabab
2001	Super Cup	Champions	—	4–3	2–1	Away	(Saudi Arabia) Al-Shabab
2001–02	Club Championship	Champions	Second round	21–0	18–0	Home	(Sri Lanka) Saunders SC
2001–02	Club Championship	Champions	Second round	21–0	Awarded (3–0)	Away	(Sri Lanka) Saunders SC
2001–02	Club Championship	Champions	Group East	Winners	0–0	—	(South Korea) Anyang LG Cheetahs
2001–02	Club Championship	Champions	Group East	Winners	2–0	—	(Japan) Kashima Antlers
2001–02	Club Championship	Champions	Group East	Winners	2–0	—	(China) Dalian Shide
2001–02	Club Championship	Champions	Semi-finals	3–0	3–0	—	(Uzbekistan) Nasaf Qarshi
2001–02	Club Championship	Champions	Final	0–0 (4–2 p)	0–0 (a.e.t.)	—	(South Korea) Anyang LG Cheetahs
2002	Super Cup	Champions	—	1–1 (4–2 p)	1–0	Home	(Saudi Arabia) Al-Hilal
2002	Super Cup	Champions	—	1–1 (4–2 p)	0–1 (a.e.t.)	Away	(Saudi Arabia) Al-Hilal
2005	Champions League	Group stage	Group E	Runners-up	5–1	Away	(Vietnam) Hoang Anh Gia Lai
2005	Champions League	Group stage	Group E	Runners-up	6–0	Home	(Vietnam) Hoang Anh Gia Lai
2005	Champions League	Group stage	Group E	Runners-up	0–0	Home	(China) Shenzhen Jianlibao
2005	Champions League	Group stage	Group E	Runners-up	0–1	Away	(China) Shenzhen Jianlibao
2005	Champions League	Group stage	Group E	Runners-up	2–1	Home	(Japan) Júbilo Iwata
2005	Champions League	Group stage	Group E	Runners-up	1–0	Away	(Japan) Júbilo Iwata
2009	Champions League	Round of 16	Group G	Runners-up	4–1	Home	(Japan) Kashima Antlers
2009	Champions League	Round of 16	Group G	Runners-up	0–3	Away	(Japan) Kashima Antlers
2009	Champions League	Round of 16	Group G	Runners-up	2–0	Away	Singapore Armed Forces
2009	Champions League	Round of 16	Group G	Runners-up	3–1	Home	Singapore Armed Forces
2009	Champions League	Round of 16	Group G	Runners-up	1–2	Away	(China) Shanghai Shenhua
2009	Champions League	Round of 16	Group G	Runners-up	2–1	Home	(China) Shanghai Shenhua
2009	Champions League	Round of 16	Round of 16	1–2	1–2	—	(Japan) Nagoya Grampus
2010	Champions League	Quarter-finals	Group G	Winners	0–0	Home	(Japan) Gamba Osaka
2010	Champions League	Quarter-finals	Group G	Winners	1–2	Away	(Japan) Gamba Osaka
2010	Champions League	Quarter-finals	Group G	Winners	2–0	Away	Singapore Armed Forces
2010	Champions League	Quarter-finals	Group G	Winners	6–2	Home	Singapore Armed Forces
2010	Champions League	Quarter-finals	Group G	Winners	2–0	Away	(China) Henan Jianye
2010	Champions League	Quarter-finals	Group G	Winners	2–0	Home	(China) Henan Jianye
2010	Champions League	Quarter-finals	Round of 16	2–0	2–0	—	(China) Beijing Guoan
2010	Champions League	Quarter-finals	Quarter-finals	3–4	1–4	Away	(South Korea) Seongnam Ilhwa Chunma
2010	Champions League	Quarter-finals	Quarter-finals	3–4	2–0	Home	(South Korea) Seongnam Ilhwa Chunma
2011	Champions League	Semi-finals	Group H	Winners	0–0	Away	(Australia) Sydney FC
2011	Champions League	Semi-finals	Group H	Winners	3–1	Home	(Australia) Sydney FC
2011	Champions League	Semi-finals	Group H	Winners	4–0	Home	(China) Shanghai Shenhua
2011	Champions League	Semi-finals	Group H	Winners	3–0	Away	(China) Shanghai Shenhua
2011	Champions League	Semi-finals	Group H	Winners	1–1	Home	(Japan) Kashima Antlers
2011	Champions League	Semi-finals	Group H	Winners	1–1	Away	(Japan) Kashima Antlers
2011	Champions League	Semi-finals	Round of 16	2–0	2–0	—	(Japan) Nagoya Grampus
2011	Champions League	Semi-finals	Quarter-finals	3–2	1–1	Home	(Iran) Zob Ahan
2011	Champions League	Semi-finals	Quarter-finals	3–2	2–1 (a.e.t.)	Away	(Iran) Zob Ahan
2011	Champions League	Semi-finals	Semi-finals	1–2	0–2	Home	(Qatar) Al-Sadd
2011	Champions League	Semi-finals	Semi-finals	1–2	1–0	Away	(Qatar) Al-Sadd
2013	Champions League	Group stage	Group H	Fourth place	0–0	Away	(Australia) Central Coast Mariners
2013	Champions League	Group stage	Group H	Fourth place	0–1	Home	(Australia) Central Coast Mariners
2013	Champions League	Group stage	Group H	Fourth place	0–0	Home	(China) Guizhou Renhe
2013	Champions League	Group stage	Group H	Fourth place	2–2	Away	(China) Guizhou Renhe
2013	Champions League	Group stage	Group H	Fourth place	2–6	Home	(Japan) Kashiwa Reysol
2013	Champions League	Group stage	Group H	Fourth place	0–0	Away	(Japan) Kashiwa Reysol
2015	Champions League	Round of 16	Group G	Runners-up	2–1	Home	(Japan) Urawa Red Diamonds
2015	Champions League	Round of 16	Group G	Runners-up	2–1	Away	(Japan) Urawa Red Diamonds
2015	Champions League	Round of 16	Group G	Runners-up	1–1	Home	(China) Beijing Guoan
2015	Champions League	Round of 16	Group G	Runners-up	0–1	Away	(China) Beijing Guoan
2015	Champions League	Round of 16	Group G	Runners-up	3–1	Home	(Australia) Brisbane Roar
2015	Champions League	Round of 16	Group G	Runners-up	3–3	Away	(Australia) Brisbane Roar
2015	Champions League	Round of 16	Round of 16	4–4 (a)	2–3	Home	(Japan) Kashiwa Reysol
2015	Champions League	Round of 16	Round of 16	4–4 (a)	2–1	Away	(Japan) Kashiwa Reysol
2016	Champions League	Group stage	Group G	Third place	0–0	Home	(Japan) Gamba Osaka
2016	Champions League	Group stage	Group G	Third place	2–1	Away	(Japan) Gamba Osaka
2016	Champions League	Group stage	Group G	Third place	1–2	Away	(China) Shanghai SIPG
2016	Champions League	Group stage	Group G	Third place	3–0	Home	(China) Shanghai SIPG
2016	Champions League	Group stage	Group G	Third place	0–0	Away	(Australia) Melbourne Victory
2016	Champions League	Group stage	Group G	Third place	1–1	Home	(Australia) Melbourne Victory
2017	Champions League	Group stage	Group G	Third place	1–1	Away	(Japan) Kawasaki Frontale
2017	Champions League	Group stage	Group G	Third place	0–1	Home	(Japan) Kawasaki Frontale
2017	Champions League	Group stage	Group G	Third place	2–2	Home	(China) Guangzhou Evergrande
2017	Champions League	Group stage	Group G	Third place	2–2	Away	(China) Guangzhou Evergrande
2017	Champions League	Group stage	Group G	Third place	1–0	Away	(Hong Kong) Eastern
2017	Champions League	Group stage	Group G	Third place	5–0	Home	(Hong Kong) Eastern
2018	Champions League	Semi-finals	Qualifying play-offs	5–1	5–1	—	(Vietnam) Thanh Hóa
2018	Champions League	Semi-finals	Group H	Winners	2–0	Away	(Australia) Sydney FC
2018	Champions League	Semi-finals	Group H	Winners	1–4	Home	(Australia) Sydney FC
2018	Champions League	Semi-finals	Group H	Winners	1–2	Home	(Japan) Kashima Antlers
2018	Champions League	Semi-finals	Group H	Winners	1–0	Away	(Japan) Kashima Antlers
2018	Champions League	Semi-finals	Group H	Winners	1–1	Home	(China) Shanghai Shenhua
2018	Champions League	Semi-finals	Group H	Winners	2–0	Away	(China) Shanghai Shenhua
2018	Champions League	Semi-finals	Round of 16	3–1	0–1	Away	(South Korea) Ulsan Hyundai
2018	Champions League	Semi-finals	Round of 16	3–1	3–0	Home	(South Korea) Ulsan Hyundai
2018	Champions League	Semi-finals	Quarter-finals	3–3 (4–2 p)	3–0	Away	(South Korea) Jeonbuk Hyundai Motors
2018	Champions League	Semi-finals	Quarter-finals	3–3 (4–2 p)	0–3 (a.e.t.)	Home	(South Korea) Jeonbuk Hyundai Motors
2018	Champions League	Semi-finals	Semi-finals	5–6	2–3	Away	(Japan) Kashima Antlers
2018	Champions League	Semi-finals	Semi-finals	5–6	3–3	Home	(Japan) Kashima Antlers
2020	Champions League	Quarter-finals	Group G	Runners-up	0–1	—	(Japan) Vissel Kobe
2020	Champions League	Quarter-finals	Group G	Runners-up	2–0	—	(Japan) Vissel Kobe
2020	Champions League	Quarter-finals	Group G	Runners-up	0–0	—	(China) Guangzhou Evergrande
2020	Champions League	Quarter-finals	Group G	Runners-up	1–1	—	(China) Guangzhou Evergrande
2020	Champions League	Quarter-finals	Round of 16	3–2	3–2	—	(Japan) Yokohama F. Marinos
2020	Champions League	Quarter-finals	Quarter-finals	1–1 (6–7 p)	1–1 (a.e.t.)	—	(Japan) Vissel Kobe

=== Ulsan HD ===
Ulsan Hyundai (Horang-i) and Ulsan HD records
Competition	Part	Pld	W	D	L	Win %	Pts	Best result
Champions League Elite	14	108	59	19	30	54.63	196	Champions (2012, 2020)
Champions League Elite qualification	—	3	2	1	0	66.67	7	—
Cup Winners' Cup	1	6	4	0	2	66.67	12	Third place (1996–97)
Total	15	117	65	20	32	55.56	215	2 titles

List of matches played by Ulsan Hyundai (Horang-i) and Ulsan HD
Season	Competition	Result	Round	Aggregate	Score	Venue	Opponent
1996–97	Cup Winners' Cup	Third place	Round of 16	8–1	5–0	Home	(Bangladesh) Mohammedan
1996–97	Cup Winners' Cup	Third place	Round of 16	8–1	3–1	Away	(Bangladesh) Mohammedan
1996–97	Cup Winners' Cup	Third place	Quarter-finals	2–1	0–1	Away	(Japan) Bellmare Hiratsuka
1996–97	Cup Winners' Cup	Third place	Quarter-finals	2–1	2–0	Home	(Japan) Bellmare Hiratsuka
1996–97	Cup Winners' Cup	Third place	Semi-finals	0–5	0–5	—	(Japan) Nagoya Grampus Eight
1996–97	Cup Winners' Cup	Third place	Third place match	1–0	1–0	—	(Iran) Esteghlal
1997–98	Club Championship	Second round	First round	6–2	2–1	Away	(Indonesia) Persebaya Surabaya
1997–98	Club Championship	Second round	First round	6–2	4–1	Home	(Indonesia) Persebaya Surabaya
1997–98	Club Championship	Second round	Second round	2–6	1–5	Home	(Japan) Kashima Antlers
1997–98	Club Championship	Second round	Second round	2–6	1–1	Away	(Japan) Kashima Antlers
2006	Champions League	Semi-finals	Group F	Winners	2–0	Away	(Japan) Tokyo Verdy
2006	Champions League	Semi-finals	Group F	Winners	1–0	Home	(Japan) Tokyo Verdy
2006	Champions League	Semi-finals	Quarter-finals	7–0	6–0	Home	(Saudi Arabia) Al-Shabab
2006	Champions League	Semi-finals	Quarter-finals	7–0	1–0	Away	(Saudi Arabia) Al-Shabab
2006	Champions League	Semi-finals	Semi-finals	4–6	3–2	Away	(South Korea) Jeonbuk Hyundai Motors
2006	Champions League	Semi-finals	Semi-finals	4–6	1–4	Home	(South Korea) Jeonbuk Hyundai Motors
2009	Champions League	Group stage	Group E	Third place	1–3	Home	(Japan) Nagoya Grampus
2009	Champions League	Group stage	Group E	Third place	1–4	Away	(Japan) Nagoya Grampus
2009	Champions League	Group stage	Group E	Third place	0–2	Away	(Australia) Newcastle Jets
2009	Champions League	Group stage	Group E	Third place	0–1	Home	(Australia) Newcastle Jets
2009	Champions League	Group stage	Group E	Third place	1–0	Home	(China) Beijing Guoan
2009	Champions League	Group stage	Group E	Third place	1–0	Away	(China) Beijing Guoan
2012	Champions League	Champions	Group F	Winners	2–1	Home	(China) Beijing Guoan
2012	Champions League	Champions	Group F	Winners	3–2	Away	(China) Beijing Guoan
2012	Champions League	Champions	Group F	Winners	2–2	Away	(Japan) FC Tokyo
2012	Champions League	Champions	Group F	Winners	1–0	Home	(Japan) FC Tokyo
2012	Champions League	Champions	Group F	Winners	1–1	Home	(Australia) Brisbane Roar
2012	Champions League	Champions	Group F	Winners	2–1	Away	(Australia) Brisbane Roar
2012	Champions League	Champions	Round of 16	3–2	3–2	—	(Japan) Kashiwa Reysol
2012	Champions League	Champions	Quarter-finals	5–0	1–0	Home	(Saudi Arabia) Al-Hilal
2012	Champions League	Champions	Quarter-finals	5–0	4–0	Away	(Saudi Arabia) Al-Hilal
2012	Champions League	Champions	Semi-finals	5–1	3–1	Away	(Uzbekistan) Bunyodkor
2012	Champions League	Champions	Semi-finals	5–1	2–0	Home	(Uzbekistan) Bunyodkor
2012	Champions League	Champions	Final	3–0	3–0	—	(Saudi Arabia) Al-Ahli
2014	Champions League	Group stage	Group H	Third place	3–1	Away	(Australia) Western Sydney Wanderers
2014	Champions League	Group stage	Group H	Third place	0–2	Home	(Australia) Western Sydney Wanderers
2014	Champions League	Group stage	Group H	Third place	2–0	Home	(Japan) Kawasaki Frontale
2014	Champions League	Group stage	Group H	Third place	1–3	Away	(Japan) Kawasaki Frontale
2014	Champions League	Group stage	Group H	Third place	1–1	Home	(China) Guizhou Renhe
2014	Champions League	Group stage	Group H	Third place	1–3	Away	(China) Guizhou Renhe
2017	Champions League	Group stage	Qualifying play-offs	1–1 (4–3 p)	1–1 (a.e.t.)	—	(Hong Kong) Kitchee
2017	Champions League	Group stage	Group E	Third place	0–2	Away	(Japan) Kashima Antlers
2017	Champions League	Group stage	Group E	Third place	0–4	Home	(Japan) Kashima Antlers
2017	Champions League	Group stage	Group E	Third place	6–0	Home	(Australia) Brisbane Roar
2017	Champions League	Group stage	Group E	Third place	3–2	Away	(Australia) Brisbane Roar
2017	Champions League	Group stage	Group E	Third place	0–0	Home	(Thailand) Muangthong United
2017	Champions League	Group stage	Group E	Third place	0–1	Away	(Thailand) Muangthong United
2018	Champions League	Round of 16	Group F	Runners-up	3–3	Away	(Australia) Melbourne Victory
2018	Champions League	Round of 16	Group F	Runners-up	6–2	Home	(Australia) Melbourne Victory
2018	Champions League	Round of 16	Group F	Runners-up	2–1	Home	(Japan) Kawasaki Frontale
2018	Champions League	Round of 16	Group F	Runners-up	2–2	Away	(Japan) Kawasaki Frontale
2018	Champions League	Round of 16	Group F	Runners-up	2–2	Away	(China) Shanghai SIPG
2018	Champions League	Round of 16	Group F	Runners-up	0–1	Home	(China) Shanghai SIPG
2018	Champions League	Round of 16	Round of 16	1–3	1–0	Home	(South Korea) Suwon Samsung Bluewings
2018	Champions League	Round of 16	Round of 16	1–3	0–3	Away	(South Korea) Suwon Samsung Bluewings
2019	Champions League	Round of 16	Qualifying play-offs	5–1	5–1	—	(Malaysia) Perak
2019	Champions League	Round of 16	Group H	Winners	0–0	Away	(Australia) Sydney FC
2019	Champions League	Round of 16	Group H	Winners	1–0	Home	(Australia) Sydney FC
2019	Champions League	Round of 16	Group H	Winners	1–0	Home	(China) Shanghai SIPG
2019	Champions League	Round of 16	Group H	Winners	0–5	Away	(China) Shanghai SIPG
2019	Champions League	Round of 16	Group H	Winners	1–0	Home	(Japan) Kawasaki Frontale
2019	Champions League	Round of 16	Group H	Winners	2–2	Away	(Japan) Kawasaki Frontale
2019	Champions League	Round of 16	Round of 16	2–4	2–1	Away	(Japan) Urawa Red Diamonds
2019	Champions League	Round of 16	Round of 16	2–4	0–3	Home	(Japan) Urawa Red Diamonds
2020	Champions League	Champions	Group F	Winners	1–1	—	(Japan) FC Tokyo
2020	Champions League	Champions	Group F	Winners	2–1	—	(Japan) FC Tokyo
2020	Champions League	Champions	Group F	Winners	3–1	—	(China) Shanghai Shenhua
2020	Champions League	Champions	Group F	Winners	4–1	—	(China) Shanghai Shenhua
2020	Champions League	Champions	Group F	Winners	2–1	—	(Australia) Perth Glory
2020	Champions League	Champions	Group F	Winners	2–0	—	(Australia) Perth Glory
2020	Champions League	Champions	Round of 16	3–0	3–0	—	(Australia) Melbourne Victory
2020	Champions League	Champions	Quarter-finals	2–0	2–0	—	(China) Beijing Guoan
2020	Champions League	Champions	Semi-finals	2–1	2–1 (a.e.t.)	—	(Japan) Vissel Kobe
2020	Champions League	Champions	Final	2–1	2–1	—	(Iran) Persepolis
2021	Champions League	Semi-finals	Group F	Winners	1–0	—	(Vietnam) Viettel
2021	Champions League	Semi-finals	Group F	Winners	3–0	—	(Vietnam) Viettel
2021	Champions League	Semi-finals	Group F	Winners	2–0	—	(Thailand) BG Pathum United
2021	Champions League	Semi-finals	Group F	Winners	2–0	—	(Thailand) BG Pathum United
2021	Champions League	Semi-finals	Group F	Winners	3–0	—	(Philippines) Kaya–Iloilo
2021	Champions League	Semi-finals	Group F	Winners	2–1	—	(Philippines) Kaya–Iloilo
2021	Champions League	Semi-finals	Round of 16	0–0 (3–2 p)	0–0 (a.e.t.)	—	(Japan) Kawasaki Frontale
2021	Champions League	Semi-finals	Quarter-finals	3–2	3–2 (a.e.t.)	—	(South Korea) Jeonbuk Hyundai Motors
2021	Champions League	Semi-finals	Semi-finals	1–1 (4–5 p)	1–1 (a.e.t.)	—	(South Korea) Pohang Steelers
2022	Champions League	Group stage	Qualifying play-offs	3–0	3–0	—	(Thailand) Port
2022	Champions League	Group stage	Group I	Third place	1–1	—	(Japan) Kawasaki Frontale
2022	Champions League	Group stage	Group I	Third place	3–2	—	(Japan) Kawasaki Frontale
2022	Champions League	Group stage	Group I	Third place	1–2	—	(Malaysia) Johor Darul Ta'zim
2022	Champions League	Group stage	Group I	Third place	1–2	—	(Malaysia) Johor Darul Ta'zim
2022	Champions League	Group stage	Group I	Third place	3–0	—	(China) Guangzhou
2022	Champions League	Group stage	Group I	Third place	5–0	—	(China) Guangzhou
2023–24	Champions League	Semi-finals	Group I	Runners-up	3–1	Home	(Thailand) BG Pathum United
2023–24	Champions League	Semi-finals	Group I	Runners-up	3–1	Away	(Thailand) BG Pathum United
2023–24	Champions League	Semi-finals	Group I	Runners-up	0–1	Away	(Japan) Kawasaki Frontale
2023–24	Champions League	Semi-finals	Group I	Runners-up	2–2	Home	(Japan) Kawasaki Frontale
2023–24	Champions League	Semi-finals	Group I	Runners-up	3–1	Home	(Malaysia) Johor Darul Ta'zim
2023–24	Champions League	Semi-finals	Group I	Runners-up	1–2	Away	(Malaysia) Johor Darul Ta'zim
2023–24	Champions League	Semi-finals	Round of 16	5–1	3–0	Home	(Japan) Ventforet Kofu
2023–24	Champions League	Semi-finals	Round of 16	5–1	2–1	Away	(Japan) Ventforet Kofu
2023–24	Champions League	Semi-finals	Quarter-finals	2–1	1–1	Away	(South Korea) Jeonbuk Hyundai Motors
2023–24	Champions League	Semi-finals	Quarter-finals	2–1	1–0	Home	(South Korea) Jeonbuk Hyundai Motors
2023–24	Champions League	Semi-finals	Semi-finals	3–3 (4–5 p)	1–0	Home	(Japan) Yokohama F. Marinos
2023–24	Champions League	Semi-finals	Semi-finals	3–3 (4–5 p)	2–3 (a.e.t.)	Away	(Japan) Yokohama F. Marinos
2024–25	Champions League Elite	League stage	League East	Tenth place	0–1	Home	(Japan) Kawasaki Frontale
2024–25	Champions League Elite	League stage	League East	Tenth place	0–4	Away	(Japan) Yokohama F. Marinos
2024–25	Champions League Elite	League stage	League East	Tenth place	0–2	Home	(Japan) Vissel Kobe
2024–25	Champions League Elite	League stage	League East	Tenth place	0–3	Away	(Malaysia) Johor Darul Ta'zim
2024–25	Champions League Elite	League stage	League East	Tenth place	1–3	Home	(China) Shanghai Port
2024–25	Champions League Elite	League stage	League East	Tenth place	2–1	Away	(China) Shanghai Shenhua
2024–25	Champions League Elite	League stage	League East	Tenth place	1–2	Away	(Thailand) Buriram United
2024–25	Champions League Elite	League stage	League East	Tenth place	Cancelled	Home	(China) Shandong Taishan
2025–26	Champions League Elite	League stage	League East	Ninth place	2–1	Home	(China) Chengdu Rongcheng
2025–26	Champions League Elite	League stage	League East	Ninth place	1–1	Away	(China) Shanghai Shenhua
2025–26	Champions League Elite	League stage	League East	Ninth place	1–0	Home	(Japan) Sanfrecce Hiroshima
2025–26	Champions League Elite	League stage	League East	Ninth place	0–1	Away	(Japan) Vissel Kobe
2025–26	Champions League Elite	League stage	League East	Ninth place	0–0	Home	(Thailand) Buriram United
2025–26	Champions League Elite	League stage	League East	Ninth place	1–3	Away	(Japan) Machida Zelvia
2025–26	Champions League Elite	League stage	League East	Ninth place	1–2	Home	(Australia) Melbourne City
2025–26	Champions League Elite	League stage	League East	Ninth place	0–0	Away	(China) Shanghai Port

=== Yangzee ===
Yangzee records
Competition	Part	Pld	W	D	L	Win %	Pts	Best result
Champions League Elite	1	6	5	0	1	83.33	15	Runners-up (1969)

List of matches played by Yangzee
Season	Competition	Result	Round	Aggregate	Score	Venue	Opponent
1969	Champion Club Tournament	Runners-up	Group A	Winners	5–0	—	(India) Mysore State
1969	Champion Club Tournament	Runners-up	Group A	Winners	7–0	—	(Philippines) Manila Lions
1969	Champion Club Tournament	Runners-up	Group A	Winners	1–0	—	(Thailand) Bangkok Bank
1969	Champion Club Tournament	Runners-up	Group A	Winners	4–1	—	(South Vietnam) Vietnam Police
1969	Champion Club Tournament	Runners-up	Semi-finals	2–0	2–0	—	(Japan) Toyo Kogyo
1969	Champion Club Tournament	Runners-up	Final	0–1	0–1 (a.e.t.)	—	(Israel) Maccabi Tel Aviv

== See also ==
- Football in South Korea
- Women's football in South Korea
- K League
