= Women's football in South Korea =

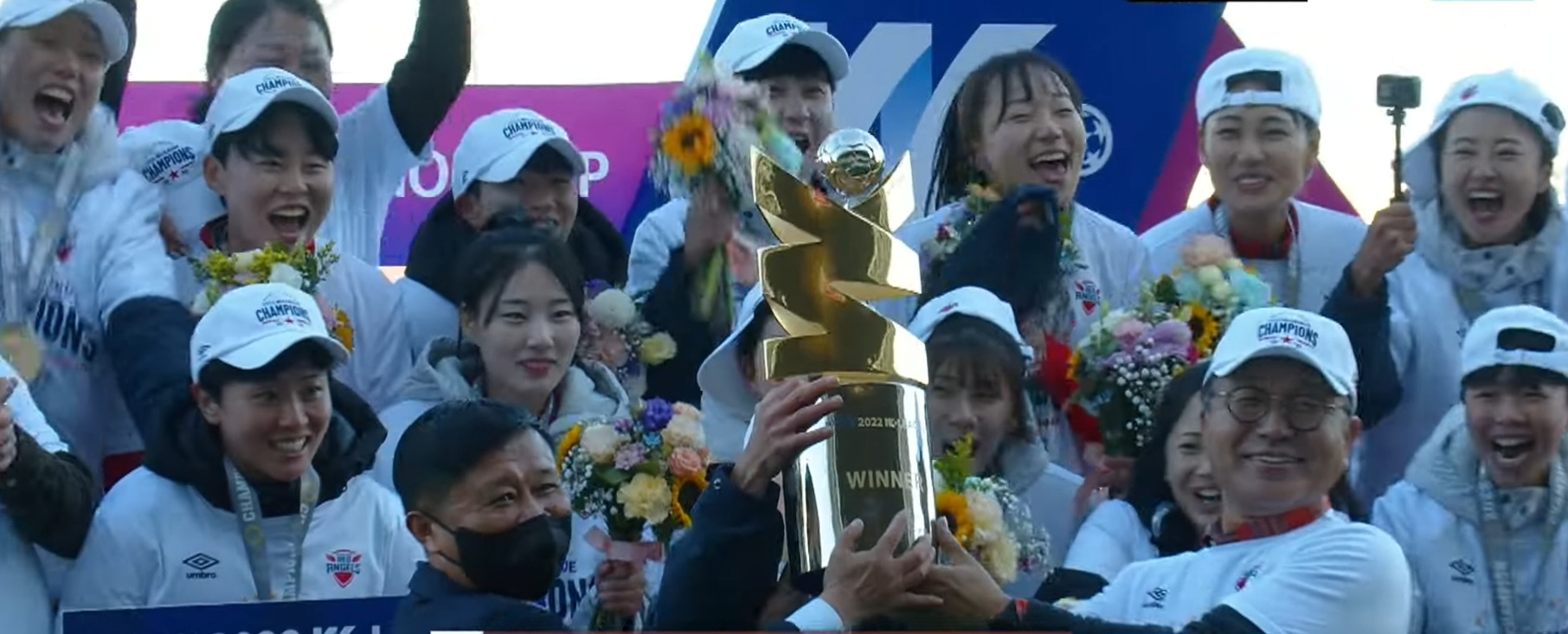
- Incheon Hyundai Steel Red Angels lift the 2022 WK League trophy
- Governing body: Korea Women's Football Federation; Korea Football Association
- National teams: Senior team; Under-20 team; Under-17 team; Universiade team
- Clubs: Full list

National competitions
- WK League

Club competitions
- AFC Women's Champions League

International competitions
- FIFA Women's World Cup; AFC Women's Asian Cup

Women's football has been played in South Korea for over seventy years, though its development was impeded by the Korean War and subsequently by opposition from some football authorities who viewed the sport as unsuitable for women. Although not as developed as the men's game in the country, a number of senior and youth teams have emerged since the 1990s. With the rising profile of women's football globally, women's football is growing in popularity in South Korea.

== History ==
=== Beginnings ===
Although similar sports had previously existed in Korea, football in its modern format was first played in the country when crew members of the British vessel HMS Flying Fish played a game while stationed in port in present-day Incheon. The idea of women playing football was first raised in 1925, when the athletic director at Ewha Women's University argued that women should exercise more, but that sports such as football should be avoided due to physiological differences between men and women.

=== Women's football in pre-war Korea ===
The first girls' football team in the country was founded in 1946 by Kim Hwa-jip, a teacher at Seoul Central Girls' Middle School and pioneer of women's football in Korea.

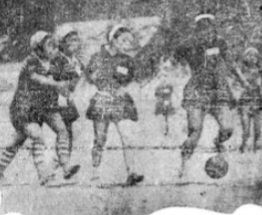
Football at the 2nd National Women's Sports Festival in 1949

The first women's football match on Korean soil took place on 28th June 1949 as part of the 2nd National Women's Sports Festival, held at Seoul Stadium (later known as Dongdaemun Stadium). Three girls' middle school teams (Muhak, Myungsung, and Seoul Central) and a team from Daegu Girls' High School participated in the girls' football tournament. A rule was added stating that handling the ball would not be considered a foul if used to block the ball from hitting the chest. Women's football proved popular, with the newspaper at the time reporting that a large crowd gathered to see Muhak beat Myungsung 2-1 in the final.

In October of the same year, a Korea Women's Football Federation was established and the first National Women's Football Tournament announced. Teams paid a 1000 won entry fee to participate in the tournament, held from 10th-11th November at Seoul Stadium. Despite the initial popularity of women's football in Korea, its development was impeded by the outbreak of the Korean War in 1950.

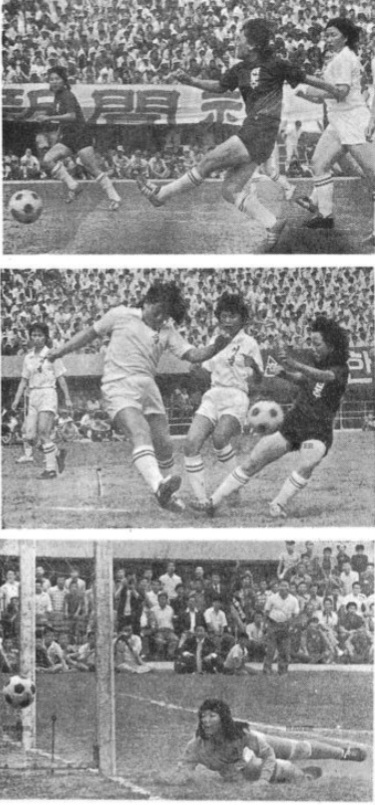
A women's football match between Jeonju and Seoul on 18th June, 1973

=== Post-war revival of women's football ===
In post-war South Korea women's football was gaining popularity as women and girls continued to play in schools, universities and grassroots clubs. Jeonju W.F.C. was established in March 1972 and played against Seoul W.F.C. on 17th June 1973 in South Korea's first official women's football match. A crowd of 10,000 gathered to watch Jeonju beat Seoul 3-0 in the match, which took place at Seoul Stadium ahead of the boys' high school football finals. After the match, Seoul Women's Football Club received over one hundred phone calls from women interested in joining the team.

In February 1974, the Korea Women's Football Federation was launched with Choi Wee-seung as the chairman and Kim Yong-sik as honorary chairman. Six clubs from across the country (Seoul W.F.C., Jeonju W.F.C., Gwangju W.F.C., Busan Muhak, Gongju Yongji Academy, and Andong Pungsan Academy) were represented at the federation's first general meeting. In June of the same year, the federation hosted the first official National Women's Football Tournament, which was attended by five teams. Jeonbuk Women claimed the title after a second-half goal from Jung Hye-mi secured them a 1-0 victory over Busan Muhak in the final.

As women continued to enjoy playing football, some advocates pushed for further development and even called for the formation of a women's national team. However, these voices were met with opposition from football authorities at the time who deemed football an unsuitable sport for women, particularly compared to other sports such as basketball and volleyball.

In the early 1980s, as a number of professional men's football clubs were established in South Korea and the Korean Super League got underway, women's football continued to be viewed as more of a novelty than a serious sport. Following recommendations from FIFA to promote the growth of women's football, the Korea Football Association hosted a number of women's football matches in 1985. A national team was also formed at the Incheon Sports Festival in 1985 through open recruitment and played a number of exhibition matches against U.S. Eighth Army teams, but a lack of players and training opportunities led to the team's dissolution in 1987.

=== 1990 Asian Games and beyond ===
The news that women's football would be included for the first time at the 1990 Asian Games, as well as the upcoming 1991 FIFA Women's World Cup led to the revival of the previously disbanded South Korea national women's football team. This renaissance also led to the foundation of the country's first university-level women's teams, at Ewha Women's University and Sookmyung Women's University. A number of high school teams and clubs were also founded at this time.

At the Asian Games in Beijing, the South Korea women's football team made its first appearance on the international stage under manager Park Kyung-hwa. The team, composed partly of athletes from other sports, lost with significant goal margins in matches against China, Japan, Taiwan and North Korea, narrowly avoiding an overall last-place finish with a 1-0 victory over Hong Kong. Despite the poor results, the tournament served as a catalyst for the development of women's football in South Korea, with the establishment of teams at various levels and the operation of domestic tournaments throughout the 1990s. The Queen's National Women's Football Championship was launched in 1993 for college and university teams. The first works team, Incheon Steel, was founded by the Hyundai Group in 1993. Without any other works teams to play against, they competed against university teams in domestic tournaments.

The national team showed improvement, achieving a fourth place finish in the 1995 AFC Women's Championship, and by the end of the 1990s, women's football appeared to be on the verge of a major expansion, with both the Ministry of Culture and Tourism and the Korea Football Association promising subsidies for new women's teams. Kyunghee University and Hanyang Women's University, both of which had previously announced the dissolution of their teams, reversed their decisions and began recruiting again. Two works teams, Hebron Mission WFC and Soongmin Wonders, were founded in late 1999, bringing the total to three.

As the longest-established team, Incheon Hyundai (by this time known as INI Steel) had already established their dominance in domestic competition. An Jong-goan, INI Steel's manager from 1999-2009, also managed the South Korean national women's team on a number of occasions, and many of the club's players also played for South Korea. Although the national team did not participate in the 1999 FIFA Women's World Cup, South Korea was represented at the tournament by its first ever female professional referee Im Eun-ju. Television broadcasts of the tournament gave many Korean viewers their first experience of women's football.

=== 2000s: National team successes and foundation of WK League ===
The Korea Women's Football Federation was founded on 9 March 2001 with the aim of creating a boom in women's football. Following the success of the 2002 men's World Cup, hosted jointly by South Korea and Japan, the Korea Football Association took a renewed interest in women's football, equipping the national team with an extra coach and a chef for the first time as they headed to the 2003 AFC Women's Championship in Thailand. Their third place finish at the tournament saw them qualify for the FIFA Women's World Cup for the first time. They lost all three group stage matches to finish at the bottom of Group B, with Kim Jin-hee scoring South Korea's only goal of the tournament. The following year, the South Korea women's U-20 team were champions of the 2004 AFC U-19 Women's Championship, beating hosts China 3-0 in the final. The senior team's first tournament win came on home soil at the 2005 EAFF Women's Championship.

Despite the disappearance of both Hebron Mission and Soongmin Wonders, a number of works teams were established in the early 2000s. By 2006, there were four active teams, and the Korea Women's Football Federation announced their plans to launch a semi-professional women's league. A pilot scheme took place in 2008 and the WK League was launched in 2009, with six teams taking part in the inaugural season. Daekyo Kangaroos were crowned the inaugural champions after beating Hyundai Steel in the championship final. As the league grew to eight teams by 2017, Hyundai Steel became a dominant force, winning eleven consecutive titles from 2013-2023.

== League system ==
WK League is the highest tier of women's football in South Korea. Following a pilot scheme in 2008, the WK League was launched in 2009. Incheon Hyundai Steel Red Angels are the league's most successful club, having won eleven consecutive titles from 2013 to 2023. The WK League currently features eight teams which each play 28 games during the regular season, meeting the other seven teams four times each. The second and third-placed teams play a one-legged playoff, with the winners progressing to a two-legged championship final against the first-placed team to determine the overall champions.

== National team ==
Since the 21st century, South Korea has seen an upsurge of success with the national team qualifying for the World Cup twice and reaching the Asian Cup final in 2022.

== Grassroots football ==
In recent years, amateur football and futsal have seen a huge growth in popularity among South Korean women, partly driven by the hit television show Shooting Stars, which features female celebrities and guests playing in a five-a-side football tournament. After the show first aired in July 2021, the social sports platform Plab Football reported a 45.2% increase in female users compared to the previous month. The Korea Football Association also saw an increase in the number of female players registered: from 2412 in 2020 to 5242 in 2024. The number of registered women’s futsal teams in the country also went from 12 to 75 during the same time period.

Since 2010, K League has organised an annual women's futsal tournament called the K League K-Win Cup, with each K League club selecting an amateur futsal team to represent them.

== See also ==
- Football in South Korea
- Korea Women's Football Federation
- South Korea women's national football team
