= Korea Women's Football Federation =

South Korean football organization

AFC
- Founded: 9 March 2001
- Headquarters: KFA House, Seoul
- Chairman: Yang Myung-seok
- Website: https://www.kwff.or.kr/

The Korea Women's Football Federation (KWFF; Korean: 한국여자축구연맹) is the governing body for women's association football in South Korea. It was founded in 2001 and runs the WK League as well as several domestic tournaments.

== History ==
=== Early years (2001–2008) ===
The KWFF was founded on 9 March 2001 in Seoul, with Soongmin Wonders manager Park Jong-hwan as chairman. Under his leadership, the KWFF established several national women's football tournaments. When Park was appointed manager of the newly established professional men's team Daegu FC, he stepped down as KWFF chairman and was replaced by Kim Jong-hwi. A professor in the sports department of Sangmyung University, Kim was the first woman to become a delegate, and later vice-chairperson of the Korea Football Association, before being appointed to lead the KWFF. Kim promised to bring about a revival of Korean women's football and expressed the aim to make South Korea one of the world's best teams, but from the beginning of her tenure, she clashed with other officials and coaches within the organisation and resigned after only three months in the role.

After two months with nobody at the helm, Lee Ui-soo was selected to see out the remainder of his predecessor's term. He oversaw investment in domestic football, seeing growth within Korea as a natural stepping stone towards the country's success on the international stage. During Lee's time as chairman, two women's works football teams were founded, bringing the total in South Korea to six, and a women's football training centre was built in Jecheon. Lee was also responsible for the introduction of a system whereby all players in elementary school girls' football academies received English lessons at least once a week.

=== Oh Kyu-sang era (2009–2024) ===
Lee Ui-soo remained in the role until late 2008, when he stepped down. Having served as vice-chair since 2003, former footballer Oh Kyu-sang was elected as the KWFF's fifth chairperson. In his first term as chair, Oh was responsible for the inaugural season of the WK League. In 2012, he was elected for a second term in charge, despite accusations of discrepancies in the election process made by rival candidate Moon Sang-mo.

Following the disbandment of Icheon Daekyo WFC in 2017, the KWFF liaised with the Ministry of Culture, Sports and Tourism and local governments to establish Changnyeong WFC and maintain the eight-team system in the WK League.

In 2024 Oh Kyu-sang announced that the KWFF would no longer organise the WK League, instead focusing on the operation of its four annual tournaments and other provisions for youth football. The KWFF had drawn criticism for the lack of development in the WK League since its foundation in 2009, and for reportedly appointing unqualified candidates as board members for several years. Oh was elected for a fifth term as chairman but died in late 2024.

=== Revival under Yang Myung-seok (2025–present) ===
Following Oh's death, the KWFF elected Yang Myung-seok as chairman. Shortly after taking up the role, Yang announced the restructuring of the KWFF and a renewed commitment to the WK League. In September 2025, the KWFF revealed the 'W-Project', a ten-year development plan for women's football in Korea, with aims including the expansion and professionalisation of the WK League. Shortly afterwards, the federation announced plans to raise the WK League salary cap for the first time in fifteen years and change rules regarding the recruitment of players. Later the same year, the KWFF pledged support for the KFA's launch of the W Korea Cup, a women's equivalent to the Korea Cup, a pre-existing men's competition.

In a New Year address at the start of 2026, Yang Myung-seok announced the upcoming launch of the WU League for women's university teams, as well as renewing the KWFF's commitment to the development of the W Korea Cup. In a statement, Yang also said that the KWFF would collaborate with WK League teams to improve marketing of the league, and introduce paid attendance for WK League matches through a unified ticketing platform.

== Presidents ==
- Park Jong-hwan (2001–2003)
- Kim Jong-hwi (2003)
- Lee Ui-soo (2003–2009)
- Oh Kyu-sang (2009–2024)
- Yang Myung-seok (2025–present)

== Competitions ==
=== WK League ===
The KWFF, in association with the Korea Football Association, is responsible for organising the semi-professional WK League, the highest division of women's football in South Korea. The league was launched in 2009 following a pilot scheme the previous year. The WK League was initially contested between six teams but has since expanded to eight. In 2025 the KWFF announced its intention to expand the league to ten teams by 2035.

=== WU League ===
Together with the Korea University Sport Federation, the KWFF launched the Women's University Football U-League in 2026, with seven teams participating in the inaugural season.

=== Tournaments ===
==== Spring Korea Women's Football Championship ====
The Spring Korea Women's Football Championship (춘계 한국여자축구연맹전) was established in 1962. The senior division was discontinued in 2009 following the establishment of the WK League.

==== Queen's Cup ====
The first edition of the Queen's Cup (여왕기 전국여자축구대회) was held at Dongdaemun Stadium in May 1993. The competition initially featured elementary school (U-12), middle school (U-15), high school (U-18), university and senior divisions, but the senior division was discontinued after the 2008 edition due to the establishment of the WK League.

==== Fall Korea Women's Football Championship ====
The Fall Korea Women's Football Championship (추계 한국여자축구연맹전) was established in 2002. At the first edition of the tournament, held in Hoengseong County, Gangwon Province, 400 girls and women took part across five age divisions: elementary school (U-12), middle school (U-15), high school (U-18), university and senior. The senior division was discontinued in 2009 following the establishment of the WK League.

==== National Women's Football Championship ====
The National Women's Football Championship (전국여자축구선수권대회) was established in 2002. In 2025 the KWFF agreed to consider changing the format of the competition or discontinuing the senior division if necessary to make room in the football calendar for the new W Korea Cup.

== See also ==
- Women's football in South Korea
- WK League
- Korea Football Association
- Football in South Korea
